= List of Walt Disney Studios films (2010–2019) =

This is a list of films produced and distributed by the American film studio Walt Disney Studios, one of the Walt Disney Company's divisions and one of the "Big Five" major film studios. The list does includes films produced or released by all existing, defunct, and formerly owned labels or subsidiaries of the Walt Disney Studios; including Walt Disney Pictures, Walt Disney Animation Studios, Pixar Animation Studios, Marvel Studios, Lucasfilm, 20th Century Studios, Searchlight Pictures, Blue Sky Studios, Disneynature, Touchstone Pictures, Hollywood Pictures, Miramax Films, and Dimension Films. The list does include films produced by studios that are now owned by Disney (as part of acquisitions), but they were historically distributed by Disney during their original, initial time of release.

All films listed are theatrical releases by Walt Disney Studios Motion Pictures unless specified. Films labeled with a ‡ symbol signifies a streaming release exclusively through Disney+.

Release date	Title	Studio release label	Notes
January 29, 2010	When in Rome	Touchstone Pictures	
March 5, 2010	Alice in Wonderland	Walt Disney Pictures	Roth Films, The Zanuck Company and Team Todd
March 26, 2010	Waking Sleeping Beauty	Walt Disney Studios	Stone Circle Pictures
March 31, 2010	The Last Song	Touchstone Pictures	Offspring Entertainment
April 22, 2010	Oceans	Disneynature	North American distribution only
May 28, 2010	Prince of Persia: The Sands of Time	Walt Disney Pictures	Jerry Bruckheimer Films
June 18, 2010	Toy Story 3	Walt Disney Pictures	Pixar Animation Studios
July 14, 2010	The Sorcerer's Apprentice	Walt Disney Pictures	Jerry Bruckheimer Films, Saturn Films and Broken Road Productions
August 6, 2010	Step Up 3D	Touchstone Pictures	North and Latin American and Spanish distribution only; Summit Entertainment and Offspring Entertainment
August 13, 2010	Tales from Earthsea	Walt Disney Studios	Japanese home media and North American and French distribution only; Studio Ghibli
September 7, 2010	The Crimson Wing: Mystery of the Flamingos	Disneynature	Natural Light Films and Kudos Pictures
September 24, 2010	You Again	Touchstone Pictures	Frontier Pictures
October 8, 2010	Secretariat	Walt Disney Pictures	Mayhem Pictures
November 24, 2010	Tangled	Walt Disney Pictures	Walt Disney Animation Studios
December 10, 2010	The Tempest	Touchstone Pictures	U.S. and select international distribution only; Miramax Films, Chartoff/Hendee Productions, TalkStory Productions, Artemis Films and Mumbai Mantra Media Limited
December 17, 2010	Tron: Legacy	Walt Disney Pictures	Sean Bailey Productions
February 11, 2011	Gnomeo & Juliet	Touchstone Pictures	distribution outside Canada, the U.K., Ireland, Latin America, Portugal, Iceland, Eastern Europe, the CIS, South Africa, the Middle East, Turkey, Israel, Singapore and Korea only; Rocket Pictures
February 18, 2011	I Am Number Four	Touchstone Pictures	distribution outside India only; DreamWorks Pictures, Reliance Entertainment and Bay Films
March 11, 2011	Mars Needs Moms	Walt Disney Pictures	ImageMovers Digital
April 22, 2011	African Cats	Disneynature	Fothergill / Scholey Productions, and Silverback Films
April 29, 2011	Prom	Walt Disney Pictures	
May 20, 2011	Pirates of the Caribbean: On Stranger Tides	Walt Disney Pictures	Jerry Bruckheimer Films
June 24, 2011	Cars 2	Walt Disney Pictures	Pixar Animation Studios
July 15, 2011	Winnie the Pooh	Walt Disney Pictures	Walt Disney Animation Studios
August 10, 2011	The Help	Touchstone Pictures	distribution outside India only; DreamWorks Pictures, Reliance Entertainment, Participant Media, Image Nation, 1492 Pictures and Harbinger Pictures
August 19, 2011	Fright Night	Touchstone Pictures	distribution outside India only; DreamWorks Pictures, Reliance Entertainment, Michael De Luca Productions and Gaeta/Rosenzweig Films
October 7, 2011	Real Steel	Touchstone Pictures	distribution outside India only; DreamWorks Pictures, Reliance Entertainment, 21 Laps Entertainment and Montford Murphy Productions
November 23, 2011	The Muppets	Walt Disney Pictures	Mandeville Films
December 25, 2011	War Horse	Touchstone Pictures	distribution outside India only; DreamWorks Pictures, Reliance Entertainment, Amblin Entertainment and The Kennedy/Marshall Company
February 17, 2012	The Secret World of Arrietty	Walt Disney Pictures	Japanese home media and North American and French distribution only; Studio Ghibli
March 9, 2012	John Carter	Walt Disney Pictures	
April 20, 2012	Chimpanzee	Disneynature	Great Ape Productions
May 4, 2012	The Avengers (Note: As part of the deal transferring the distribution rights of The Avengers and Iron Man 3 (2013) from Paramount Pictures to the Walt Disney Studios, Paramount's logo appears in the films' opening titles, promotional materials, and merchandise. Nevertheless, Walt Disney Studios Motion Pictures is credited at the end of the film.)	Marvel Studios	
June 22, 2012	Brave	Walt Disney Pictures	Pixar Animation Studios
June 29, 2012	People Like Us	Touchstone Pictures	distribution outside India only; DreamWorks Pictures, Reliance Entertainment and K/O Paper Products
August 15, 2012	The Odd Life of Timothy Green	Walt Disney Pictures	Scott Sanders Productions
October 5, 2012	Frankenweenie	Walt Disney Pictures	Tim Burton Productions
October 23, 2012 (limited)	Secret of the Wings	Walt Disney Pictures	Disneytoon Studios and Prana Studios
November 2, 2012	Wreck-It Ralph	Walt Disney Pictures	Walt Disney Animation Studios
November 16, 2012	Lincoln	Touchstone Pictures	North American distribution only; DreamWorks Pictures, 20th Century Fox, Reliance Entertainment, Participant Media, Dune Entertainment, Amblin Entertainment and The Kennedy/Marshall Company
March 8, 2013	Oz the Great and Powerful	Walt Disney Pictures	Roth Films and Curtis-Donen Productions
April 16, 2013	Wings of Life	Disneynature	Blacklight Films
May 3, 2013	Iron Man 3	Marvel Studios	DMG Entertainment; distribution outside Germany, Austria and home media and television in Switzerland, Liechtenstein, Luxembourg and Alto Adige only; co-distributed in China by DMG Entertainment
June 21, 2013	Monsters University	Walt Disney Pictures	Pixar Animation Studios
July 3, 2013	The Lone Ranger	Walt Disney Pictures	Jerry Bruckheimer Films, Infinitum Nihil and Blind Wink Productions
August 9, 2013	Planes	Walt Disney Pictures	Disneytoon Studios
October 18, 2013	The Fifth Estate	Touchstone Pictures	distribution in North and Latin America, Australia, New Zealand, Russia and Asia excluding India only; DreamWorks Pictures, Reliance Entertainment, Participant Media and Anonymous Content
November 8, 2013	Thor: The Dark World	Marvel Studios	
November 22, 2013	Delivery Man	Touchstone Pictures	distribution in North and Latin America, Australia, New Zealand, Russia and Asia excluding India only; DreamWorks Pictures, Reliance Entertainment and Caramel Film
November 27, 2013	Frozen	Walt Disney Pictures	Walt Disney Animation Studios
December 13, 2013	Saving Mr. Banks	Walt Disney Pictures	Ruby Films, Essential Media and Entertainment, BBC Films and Hopscotch Features
February 21, 2014	The Wind Rises	Touchstone Pictures	Japanese home media and North American and French distribution only; Studio Ghibli, Nippon Television Network, Dentsu, Hakuhodo DY Media Partners, Walt Disney Japan, Mitsubishi, Toho, KDDI and The Kennedy/Marshall Company
March 14, 2014	Need for Speed	Touchstone Pictures	distribution in North and Latin America, Australia, New Zealand, Russia and Asia excluding India only; DreamWorks Pictures, Reliance Entertainment, Bandito Brothers and Electronic Arts
March 21, 2014	Muppets Most Wanted	Walt Disney Pictures	Mandeville Films
April 1, 2014 (limited)	The Pirate Fairy	Walt Disney Pictures	DisneyToon Studios and Prana Studios
April 4, 2014	Captain America: The Winter Soldier	Marvel Studios	
April 18, 2014	Bears	Disneynature	Silverback Films
May 16, 2014	Million Dollar Arm	Walt Disney Pictures	Roth Films and Mayhem Pictures
May 30, 2014	Maleficent	Walt Disney Pictures	Roth Films
July 18, 2014	Planes: Fire & Rescue	Walt Disney Pictures	Disneytoon Studios
August 1, 2014	Guardians of the Galaxy	Marvel Studios	
August 8, 2014	The Hundred-Foot Journey	Touchstone Pictures	distribution in North and Latin America, Australia, New Zealand, Russia and Asia excluding India only; DreamWorks Pictures, Reliance Entertainment, Participant Media, Image Nation, Amblin Entertainment and Harpo Films
October 10, 2014	Alexander and the Terrible, Horrible, No Good, Very Bad Day	Walt Disney Pictures	21 Laps Entertainment and The Jim Henson Company
November 7, 2014	Big Hero 6	Walt Disney Pictures	Walt Disney Animation Studios
December 25, 2014	Into the Woods	Walt Disney Pictures	Lucamar Productions and Marc Platt Productions
January 23, 2015	Strange Magic	Touchstone Pictures	Lucasfilm, Lucasfilm Animation and Industrial Light & Magic
January 30, 2015 (limited)	Tinker Bell and the Legend of the NeverBeast	Walt Disney Pictures	Disneytoon Studios
February 20, 2015	McFarland, USA	Walt Disney Pictures	Mayhem Pictures
March 13, 2015	Cinderella	Walt Disney Pictures	Kinberg Genre, Allison Shearmur Productions and Beagle Pug Films
April 17, 2015	Monkey Kingdom	Disneynature	Silverback Films
May 1, 2015	Avengers: Age of Ultron	Marvel Studios	
May 22, 2015	Tomorrowland	Walt Disney Pictures	A113 Productions
June 19, 2015	Inside Out	Walt Disney Pictures	Pixar Animation Studios
July 17, 2015	Ant-Man	Marvel Studios	
October 16, 2015	Bridge of Spies	Touchstone Pictures	North American distribution only; DreamWorks Pictures, Fox 2000 Pictures, Reliance Entertainment, Participant Media, Afterworks Limited, Studio Babelsberg, Amblin Entertainment and Marc Platt Productions
November 25, 2015	The Good Dinosaur	Walt Disney Pictures	Pixar Animation Studios
December 18, 2015	Star Wars: The Force Awakens	Lucasfilm	Bad Robot
January 29, 2016	The Finest Hours	Walt Disney Pictures	Whitaker Entertainment and Red Hawk Entertainment
March 4, 2016	Zootopia	Walt Disney Pictures	Walt Disney Animation Studios
April 15, 2016	The Jungle Book	Walt Disney Pictures	Fairview Entertainment
May 6, 2016	Captain America: Civil War	Marvel Studios	
May 27, 2016	Alice Through the Looking Glass	Walt Disney Pictures	Roth Films, Team Todd and Tim Burton Productions
June 17, 2016	Finding Dory	Walt Disney Pictures	Pixar Animation Studios
July 1, 2016	The BFG	Walt Disney Pictures	distribution outside Europe, the Middle East, Africa, India and China only; Amblin Entertainment, Reliance Entertainment, Walden Media, The Kennedy/Marshall Company and The Roald Dahl Story Company
August 12, 2016	Pete's Dragon	Walt Disney Pictures	Whitaker Entertainment
September 2, 2016	The Light Between Oceans	Touchstone Pictures	North American distribution only; DreamWorks Pictures, Reliance Entertainment, Participant Media and Heyday Films; final film distributed by Disney under the Touchstone label.
September 23, 2016	Queen of Katwe	Walt Disney Pictures	ESPN Films, Cine Mosaic and Mirabai Films
November 4, 2016	Doctor Strange	Marvel Studios	
November 23, 2016	Moana	Walt Disney Pictures	Walt Disney Animation Studios
December 16, 2016	Rogue One	Lucasfilm	
March 17, 2017	Beauty and the Beast	Walt Disney Pictures	Mandeville Films
April 21, 2017 (Note: Released in China on August 12, 2016)	Born in China	Disneynature	Shanghai Media Group, Chuan Films and Brian Leith Productions
May 5, 2017	Guardians of the Galaxy Vol. 2	Marvel Studios	
May 26, 2017	Pirates of the Caribbean: Dead Men Tell No Tales	Walt Disney Pictures	Jerry Bruckheimer Films
June 16, 2017	Cars 3	Walt Disney Pictures	Pixar Animation Studios
June 30, 2017	Ghost of the Mountains	Disneynature	Netflix Original Documentaries and Brian Leith Productions
November 3, 2017	Thor: Ragnarok	Marvel Studios	
November 22, 2017	Coco	Walt Disney Pictures	Pixar Animation Studios
December 15, 2017	Star Wars: The Last Jedi	Lucasfilm	
December 27, 2017	Expedition China	Disneynature	Netflix Original Documentaries and Brian Leith Productions
February 16, 2018	Black Panther	Marvel Studios	
March 9, 2018	A Wrinkle in Time	Walt Disney Pictures	Whitaker Entertainment
April 27, 2018	Avengers: Infinity War	Marvel Studios	
May 25, 2018	Solo: A Star Wars Story	Lucasfilm	
June 15, 2018	Incredibles 2	Walt Disney Pictures	Pixar Animation Studios
July 6, 2018	Ant-Man and the Wasp	Marvel Studios	
August 3, 2018	Christopher Robin	Walt Disney Pictures	
November 2, 2018	The Nutcracker and the Four Realms	Walt Disney Pictures	The Mark Gordon Company
November 21, 2018	Ralph Breaks the Internet	Walt Disney Pictures	Walt Disney Animation Studios
December 19, 2018	Mary Poppins Returns	Walt Disney Pictures	Lucamar Productions and Marc Platt Productions
March 8, 2019	Captain Marvel	Marvel Studios	
March 29, 2019	Dumbo	Walt Disney Pictures	Tim Burton Productions, Infinite Detective Productions and Secret Machine Entertainment
April 17, 2019	Breakthrough	20th Century Fox	Fox 2000 Pictures and Franklin Entertainment; first 20th Century Fox film released under Disney ownership following the latter's acquisition of parent 21st Century Fox.
April 17, 2019	Penguins	Disneynature	Silverback Films
April 26, 2019	Avengers: Endgame	Marvel Studios	
May 10, 2019	Tolkien	Fox Searchlight Pictures	Chernin Entertainment
May 24, 2019	Aladdin	Walt Disney Pictures	Lin Pictures, Rideback Productions and Marc Platt Productions
June 7, 2019	Dark Phoenix	20th Century Fox	Marvel Entertainment, The Donners' Company
June 21, 2019	Toy Story 4	Walt Disney Pictures	Pixar Animation Studios
July 12, 2019	Stuber	20th Century Fox	GoldDay Productions
July 19, 2019	The Lion King	Walt Disney Pictures	Fairview Entertainment
August 8, 2019	The Art of Racing in the Rain	20th Century Fox	Fox 2000 Pictures, Original Film, Starbucks Entertainment and Shifting Gears Productions
August 21, 2019	Ready or Not	Fox Searchlight Pictures	
September 20, 2019	Ad Astra	20th Century Fox	distribution outside China, Hong Kong and Taiwan only; Regency Enterprises, Bona Film Group, New Regency, Plan B Entertainment, RT Features, Keep Your Head Productions and MadRiver Pictures
October 4, 2019	Lucy in the Sky	Fox Searchlight Pictures	Pacific Standard and 26 Keys Productions
October 18, 2019	Jojo Rabbit	Fox Searchlight Pictures	Defender Films and Piki Films; limited release, opened wide on November 8, 2019
October 18, 2019	Maleficent: Mistress of Evil	Walt Disney Pictures	Roth Films
November 12, 2019	Noelle ‡	Walt Disney Pictures	
November 12, 2019	Lady and the Tramp ‡	Walt Disney Pictures	Taylor Made
November 15, 2019	Ford v Ferrari	20th Century Fox	Chernin Entertainment and Turnpike Films
November 22, 2019	Frozen 2	Walt Disney Pictures	Walt Disney Animation Studios
December 13, 2019	A Hidden Life	Fox Searchlight Pictures	distribution outside France, Germany, Austria, Scandinavia, Portugal, Greece, Cyprus, former Yugoslavia, the CIS, the Middle East and Israel only; Elizabeth Bay Productions, Aceway and Studio Babelsberg; limited release; final film released under the Fox Searchlight Pictures name
December 20, 2019	Togo ‡	Walt Disney Pictures	
December 20, 2019	Star Wars: The Rise of Skywalker	Lucasfilm	Bad Robot
December 25, 2019	Spies in Disguise	20th Century Fox	20th Century Fox Animation, Blue Sky Studios and Chernin Entertainment (Note: Distributed by Disney+ in Japan in 2020 due to the Coronavirus pandemic)

== See also ==
- List of Disney feature-length home entertainment releases
- List of Disney television films
- List of Disney+ original films
- List of Hollywood Pictures films
- List of films released by Lucasfilm
- List of Marvel Studios films
- List of Star Studio18 films
- List of Searchlight Pictures films
- List of 20th Century Studios films
- List of Touchstone Pictures films
- List of Walt Disney Pictures films
- Category:Lists of films by studio
