= List of Walt Disney Pictures films =

This is a list of films produced by and released under the Walt Disney Pictures banner (known as that since 1983, with Never Cry Wolf as its first release) and films released before that under the former name of the parent company, Walt Disney Productions (1929–1983). Most films listed here were distributed theatrically in the United States by the company's distribution division, Walt Disney Studios Motion Pictures, formerly known as Buena Vista Film Distribution Company (1953–1960), Buena Vista Distribution Company (1960–1987) and Buena Vista Pictures Distribution (1987–2007). The Disney features produced before The Living Desert (1953) were originally distributed by United Artists and RKO Radio Pictures, and are now distributed by Walt Disney Studios Motion Pictures. Some films produced by Walt Disney Pictures are also released through the parent company's streaming service, Disney+.

This list is organized by release date and includes live-action feature films (including theatrical, direct-to-video and streaming releases), animated feature films (including films developed and produced by Walt Disney Animation Studios and Pixar Animation Studios) and documentary films (including titles from the True-Life Adventures series and films produced by the Disneynature label). For an exclusive list of animated films released by Walt Disney Pictures and its previous entities see List of Disney theatrical animated feature films and List of Disney feature-length home entertainment releases § Animated films.

This list is only for films released under the main Disney banner. It does not include films produced or released by other existing, defunct or divested labels or subsidiaries owned by Walt Disney Studios (i.e. Marvel Studios, Lucasfilm, 20th Century Studios, Searchlight Pictures, Fox 2000 Pictures, Touchstone Pictures, Hollywood Pictures, National Geographic Documentary Films, Miramax Films, Dimension Films, ESPN Films, etc.) unless they are credited as co-production partners, nor any direct-to-video releases unless they were produced under the main Disney banner, TV films, theatrical re-releases or films originally released by other non-Disney studios.

All films listed are theatrical releases and/or American-based films unless specified.

- A ‡ symbol signifies a direct-to-video or streaming release exclusively through Disney+.
- A † symbol signifies a premium video on demand release through Disney+.
- A § symbol signifies a simultaneous release to theatres and on premium video on demand.
- A * symbol signifies a film not produced in the United States, but rather in another country.

== Released ==
=== 1937–1940s ===
Release date	Title	Notes
December 21, 1937	Snow White and the Seven Dwarfs	first film to be distributed by RKO Radio Pictures; Inducted into the National Film Registry in 1989
February 7, 1940	Pinocchio	Inducted into the National Film Registry in 1994
November 13, 1940	Fantasia	anthology film Inducted into the National Film Registry in 1990
June 20, 1941	The Reluctant Dragon	fictionalized tour around the Disney studio
October 23, 1941	Dumbo	Inducted into the National Film Registry in 2017
August 21, 1942	Bambi	Inducted into the National Film Registry in 2011
February 6, 1943	Saludos Amigos	anthology film
July 17, 1943	Victory Through Air Power	documentary film with wide use of animation; distributed by United Artists
February 3, 1945	The Three Caballeros	anthology film
April 20, 1946	Make Mine Music	anthology film
November 12, 1946	Song of the South	
September 27, 1947	Fun and Fancy Free	anthology film
May 27, 1948	Melody Time	anthology film
November 29, 1948	So Dear to My Heart	
October 5, 1949	The Adventures of Ichabod and Mr. Toad	anthology film

=== 1950s ===
Release date	Title	Notes
February 15, 1950	Cinderella	Inducted into the National Film Registry in 2018
July 29, 1950	Treasure Island	First all live action Disney film; produced by RKO-Walt Disney British Productions
July 28, 1951	Alice in Wonderland	
June 26, 1952	The Story of Robin Hood	produced by RKO-Walt Disney British Productions
February 5, 1953	Peter Pan	
July 23, 1953	The Sword and the Rose	produced by RKO-Walt Disney British Productions
November 10, 1953	The Living Desert	first film to be distributed by Buena Vista Pictures Distribution; first feature length True-Life Adventures nature documentary
February 27, 1954	Rob Roy: The Highland Rogue	produced by RKO-Walt Disney British Productions; last film to be distributed by RKO Radio Pictures
August 16, 1954	The Vanishing Prairie	True Life Adventures nature documentary
December 23, 1954	20,000 Leagues Under the Sea	
May 25, 1955	Davy Crockett: King of the Wild Frontier	compilation film mostly made up from pre-existing footage from the Disney anthology television series
June 22, 1955	Lady and the Tramp	Inducted into the National Film Registry in 2023.
September 14, 1955	The African Lion	True Life Adventures nature documentary
December 22, 1955	The Littlest Outlaw	
June 8, 1956	The Great Locomotive Chase	
July 18, 1956	Davy Crockett and the River Pirates	compilation film mostly made up from pre-existing footage from the Disney anthology television series
November 6, 1956	Secrets of Life	True Life Adventures nature documentary
December 20, 1956	Westward Ho the Wagons!	
June 19, 1957	Johnny Tremain	
August 28, 1957	Perri	"A True-Life Fantasy" combining scripted and documentary elements
December 25, 1957	Old Yeller	Inducted into the National Film Registry in 2019
July 8, 1958	The Light in the Forest	
August 12, 1958	White Wilderness	True Life Adventures nature documentary
December 25, 1958	Tonka	
January 29, 1959	Sleeping Beauty	Inducted into the National Film Registry in 2019
March 19, 1959	The Shaggy Dog	
June 26, 1959	Darby O'Gill and the Little People	
November 10, 1959	Third Man on the Mountain	

=== 1960s ===
Release date	Title	Notes
January 21, 1960	Toby Tyler or 10 Weeks with a Circus	
February 24, 1960	Kidnapped	
May 19, 1960	Pollyanna	
June 11, 1960	The Sign of Zorro	released in European theaters in 1958
August 10, 1960	Jungle Cat	True Life Adventures nature documentary
November 1, 1960	Ten Who Dared	
December 21, 1960	Swiss Family Robinson	
January 25, 1961	One Hundred and One Dalmatians	
March 16, 1961	The Absent-Minded Professor	
June 21, 1961	The Parent Trap	
July 12, 1961	Nikki: Wild Dog of the North	
July 17, 1961	Greyfriars Bobby	
December 14, 1961	Babes in Toyland	
April 5, 1962	Moon Pilot	
May 17, 1962	Bon Voyage!	
June 6, 1962	Big Red	
September 26, 1962	Almost Angels	
November 7, 1962	The Legend of Lobo	
December 21, 1962	In Search of the Castaways	
January 16, 1963	Son of Flubber	
March 29, 1963	Miracle of the White Stallions	
June 1, 1963	Savage Sam	
July 7, 1963	Summer Magic	
November 20, 1963	The Incredible Journey	
December 25, 1963	The Sword in the Stone	
March 12, 1964	A Tiger Walks	
March 25, 1964	The Misadventures of Merlin Jones	
June 4, 1964	The Three Lives of Thomasina	
July 8, 1964	The Moon-Spinners	
August 29, 1964	Mary Poppins	winner of the Golden Globe Award for Best Motion Picture – Musical or Comedy and nominee of the Academy Award for Best Picture; Inducted into the National Film Registry in 2013
November 10, 1964	Those Calloways	
December 18, 1964	Emil and the Detectives	
August 18, 1965	The Monkey's Uncle	
December 2, 1965	That Darn Cat!	
February 16, 1966	The Ugly Dachshund	
July 29, 1966	Lt. Robin Crusoe, U.S.N.	
October 1, 1966	The Fighting Prince of Donegal	
December 1, 1966	Follow Me, Boys!	last film released by Walt Disney Productions during the lifetime of Walt Disney, who died two weeks later
February 8, 1967	Monkeys, Go Home!	
March 8, 1967	The Adventures of Bullwhip Griffin	
July 19, 1967	The Gnome-Mobile	
October 18, 1967	The Jungle Book	
October 18, 1967	Charlie, the Lonesome Cougar	
November 30, 1967	The Happiest Millionaire	
February 8, 1968	Blackbeard's Ghost	
March 21, 1968	The One and Only, Genuine, Original Family Band	last film with personal involvement from Walt Disney, who died during production
June 26, 1968	Never a Dull Moment	
December 20, 1968	The Horse in the Gray Flannel Suit	
March 13, 1969	The Love Bug	
March 21, 1969	Smith!	
June 11, 1969	Rascal	
December 24, 1969	The Computer Wore Tennis Shoes	

=== 1970s ===
Release date	Title	Notes
February 11, 1970	King of the Grizzlies	
July 1, 1970	The Boatniks	
December 15, 1970	The Wild Country	
December 24, 1970	The Aristocats	last animated film with personal involvement from Walt Disney, who died during production
March 17, 1971	The Barefoot Executive	
June 22, 1971	Scandalous John	
June 30, 1971	The Million Dollar Duck	
December 13, 1971	Bedknobs and Broomsticks	
March 22, 1972	The Biscuit Eater	
July 12, 1972	Now You See Him, Now You Don't	
July 19, 1972	Napoleon and Samantha	
October 18, 1972	Run, Cougar, Run	
December 22, 1972	Snowball Express	
February 1, 1973	The World's Greatest Athlete	
March 23, 1973	Charley and the Angel	
June 20, 1973	One Little Indian	
November 8, 1973	Robin Hood	
December 14, 1973	Superdad	
June 6, 1974	Herbie Rides Again	
July 31, 1974	The Bears and I	
August 1, 1974	The Castaway Cowboy	
December 20, 1974	The Island at the Top of the World	
February 6, 1975	The Strongest Man in the World	
March 21, 1975	Escape to Witch Mountain	
July 1, 1975	The Apple Dumpling Gang	
July 9, 1975	One of Our Dinosaurs Is Missing	
October 8, 1975	The Best of Walt Disney's True-Life Adventures	compilation film made up of highlights from the True-Life Adventures series
December 25, 1975	Ride a Wild Pony	
February 5, 1976	No Deposit, No Return	
May 26, 1976	The Littlest Horse Thieves	released in American theaters in 1977; also known as Escape from the Dark
July 1, 1976	Treasure of Matecumbe	
July 7, 1976	Gus	
December 17, 1976	The Shaggy D.A.	
December 17, 1976	Freaky Friday	
March 11, 1977	The Many Adventures of Winnie the Pooh	anthology film, last animated short films with personal involvement from Walt Disney
June 22, 1977	The Rescuers	
June 24, 1977	Herbie Goes to Monte Carlo	
November 3, 1977	Pete's Dragon	
December 16, 1977	Candleshoe	
March 10, 1978	Return from Witch Mountain	
June 9, 1978	The Cat from Outer Space	
July 5, 1978	Hot Lead and Cold Feet	
February 9, 1979	The North Avenue Irregulars	
June 27, 1979	The Apple Dumpling Gang Rides Again	
July 26, 1979	Unidentified Flying Oddball	
December 21, 1979	The Black Hole	

=== 1980s ===
Release date	Title	Notes
February 8, 1980	Midnight Madness	
April 17, 1980	The Watcher in the Woods	
June 25, 1980	Herbie Goes Bananas	
June 25, 1980	The Last Flight of Noah's Ark	
December 12, 1980	Popeye	international distribution only; co-production with Paramount Pictures and King Features
March 6, 1981	The Devil and Max Devlin	
March 20, 1981	Amy	
June 26, 1981	Dragonslayer	international distribution only; co-production with Paramount Pictures; international distribution handled by Buena Vista International
July 10, 1981	The Fox and the Hound	
August 7, 1981	Condorman	
February 5, 1982	Night Crossing	
July 9, 1982	Tron	co-production with Lisberger/Kushner Productions
July 30, 1982	Tex	
March 11, 1983	Trenchcoat	uncredited
April 29, 1983	Something Wicked This Way Comes	co-production with The Bryna Company; last film as Walt Disney Productions
October 7, 1983	Never Cry Wolf	co-production with Amarok Productions Ltd.; first film as Walt Disney Pictures
June 21, 1985	Return to Oz	co-production with Silver Screen Partners II
July 24, 1985	The Black Cauldron	co-production with Walt Disney Feature Animation and Silver Screen Partners II
September 27, 1985	The Journey of Natty Gann	co-production with Silver Screen Partners II
November 22, 1985	One Magic Christmas	co-production with Silver Screen Partners II and Telefilm Canada
July 2, 1986	The Great Mouse Detective	co-production with Walt Disney Feature Animation and Silver Screen Partners II
August 1, 1986	Flight of the Navigator	North American distribution and U.K. theatrical distribution only; co-production with Producers Sales Organization and New Star Entertainment
June 19, 1987	Benji the Hunted	co-production with Silver Screen Partners III and Mulberry Square Productions
April 15, 1988	Return to Snowy River	co-production with Silver Screen Partners III, Burrowes Film Group and The Hoyts Group
November 18, 1988	Oliver & Company	co-production with Walt Disney Feature Animation and Silver Screen Partners III
June 23, 1989	Honey, I Shrunk the Kids	co-production with Silver Screen Partners III
August 18, 1989	Cheetah	co-production with Silver Screen Partners III
November 17, 1989	The Little Mermaid	co-production with Walt Disney Feature Animation and Silver Screen Partners IV; nominee of the Golden Globe Award for Best Motion Picture – Musical or Comedy; Inducted into the National Film Registry in 2022

=== 1990s ===
Release date	Title	Notes
August 3, 1990	DuckTales the Movie: Treasure of the Lost Lamp	co-production with Disney MovieToons; first Disney MovieToons film
November 16, 1990	The Rescuers Down Under	co-production with Walt Disney Feature Animation and Silver Screen Partners IV
January 18, 1991	White Fang	co-production with Silver Screen Partners IV and Hybrid Productions Inc.
March 1, 1991	Shipwrecked	distribution outside Scandinavia only; co-production with AB Svensk Filmindustri
May 24, 1991	Wild Hearts Can't Be Broken	co-production with Silver Screen Partners IV and Pegasus Entertainment
June 21, 1991	The Rocketeer	released under Walt Disney Pictures in North America and under Touchstone Pictures outside of North America; co-production with Silver Screen Partners IV and The Gordon Company
November 22, 1991	Beauty and the Beast	co-production with Walt Disney Feature Animation and Silver Screen Partners IV; winner of the Golden Globe Award for Best Motion Picture – Musical or Comedy and nominee of the Academy Award for Best Picture; Inducted into the National Film Registry in 2002
April 10, 1992	Newsies	co-production with Touchwood Pacific Partners
July 17, 1992	Honey, I Blew Up the Kid	co-production with Touchwood Pacific Partners
October 2, 1992	The Mighty Ducks	co-production with Touchwood Pacific Partners and Avnet–Kerner Productions
November 25, 1992	Aladdin	co-production with Walt Disney Feature Animation; nominee of the Golden Globe Award for Best Motion Picture – Musical or Comedy
December 11, 1992	The Muppet Christmas Carol	co-production with Jim Henson Productions
February 3, 1993	Homeward Bound: The Incredible Journey	co-production with Touchwood Pacific Partners
March 12, 1993	A Far Off Place	co-production with Touchwood Pacific Partners and Amblin Entertainment
April 2, 1993	The Adventures of Huck Finn	
July 16, 1993	Hocus Pocus	co-production with David Kirschner Productions
October 1, 1993	Cool Runnings	
November 12, 1993	The Three Musketeers	co-production with Caravan Pictures and Avnet–Kerner Productions
January 14, 1994	Iron Will	
February 11, 1994	Blank Check	
March 25, 1994	D2: The Mighty Ducks	co-production with Avnet–Kerner Productions
April 15, 1994	White Fang 2: Myth of the White Wolf	
June 24, 1994	The Lion King	co-production with Walt Disney Feature Animation; winner of the Golden Globe Award for Best Motion Picture – Musical or Comedy; Inducted into the National Film Registry in 2016
July 15, 1994	Angels in the Outfield	co-production with Caravan Pictures
October 28, 1994	Squanto: A Warrior's Tale	
November 11, 1994	The Santa Clause	co-production with Hollywood Pictures and Outlaw Productions
December 25, 1994	Rudyard Kipling's The Jungle Book	distribution in the U.S., the U.K., Ireland, Portugal, Greece, Switzerland, Scandinavia, the Benelux and Latin America excluding Argentina only; co-production with MDP Worldwide, Vegahom Europe, Baloo Productions and Jungle Book Films
February 17, 1995	Heavyweights	co-production with Caravan Pictures
March 3, 1995	Man of the House	co-production with All Girl Productions and Orr & Cruickshank Productions
March 24, 1995	Tall Tale	co-production with Caravan Pictures
April 7, 1995	A Goofy Movie	co-production with Disney MovieToons
June 23, 1995	Pocahontas	co-production with Walt Disney Feature Animation
July 28, 1995	Operation Dumbo Drop	co-production with Interscope Communications and PolyGram Filmed Entertainment
August 11, 1995	A Kid in King Arthur's Court	North American and select international distribution only; co-production with Trimark Pictures and Tapestry Films
September 29, 1995	The Big Green	co-production with Caravan Pictures
October 20, 1995	Frank and Ollie	
November 22, 1995	Toy Story	distribution only; produced by Pixar Animation Studios; nominee of the Golden Globe Award for Best Motion Picture – Musical or Comedy; Inducted into the National Film Registry in 2005
December 22, 1995	Tom and Huck	
February 16, 1996	Muppet Treasure Island	co-production with Jim Henson Productions
March 8, 1996	Homeward Bound II: Lost in San Francisco	
April 12, 1996	James and the Giant Peach	distribution outside the U.K., Ireland and German-speaking territories only; co-production with Skellington Productions and Allied Filmmakers
June 21, 1996	The Hunchback of Notre Dame	co-production with Walt Disney Feature Animation
August 30, 1996	First Kid	co-production with Caravan Pictures
October 4, 1996	D3: The Mighty Ducks	co-production with Avnet–Kerner Productions
November 27, 1996	101 Dalmatians	co-production with Great Oaks Entertainment
February 14, 1997	That Darn Cat	co-production with Robert Simonds Productions
March 7, 1997	Jungle 2 Jungle	distribution outside France only; co-production with TF1
March 18, 1997	Honey, We Shrunk Ourselves ‡	
June 27, 1997	Hercules	co-production with Walt Disney Feature Animation
July 16, 1997	George of the Jungle	co-production with Mandeville Films and Avnet–Kerner Productions
August 1, 1997	Air Bud	U.S., Australian and New Zealand distribution only; produced by Keystone Entertainment
October 10, 1997	RocketMan	co-production with Caravan Pictures and Roger Birnbaum Productions
November 26, 1997	Flubber	co-production with Great Oaks Entertainment
December 25, 1997	Mr. Magoo	co-production with UPA Productions
March 27, 1998	Meet the Deedles	distribution in English-speaking territories only; co-production with DIC Entertainment and Peak Productions
June 19, 1998	Mulan	co-production with Walt Disney Feature Animation
July 29, 1998	The Parent Trap	
September 29, 1998	The Jungle Book: Mowgli's Story ‡	
October 8, 1998	Serengeti Symphony *	Dutch film; Benelux distribution only; produced by Nature Conservation Films
November 13, 1998	I'll Be Home for Christmas	co-production with Mandeville Films
November 20, 1998	A Bug's Life	co-production with Pixar Animation Studios
December 25, 1998	Mighty Joe Young	co-production with RKO Pictures and The Jacobson Company
February 12, 1999	My Favorite Martian	
March 26, 1999	Doug's 1st Movie	co-production with Jumbo Pictures
May 14, 1999	Endurance	
June 18, 1999	Tarzan	co-production with Walt Disney Feature Animation
July 23, 1999	Inspector Gadget	co-production with Caravan Pictures, DIC Entertainment, Avnet–Kerner Productions and Roger Birnbaum Productions
October 15, 1999	The Straight Story	U.S., Scandinavian, Australian and New Zealand distribution only; produced by Asymmetrical Productions, FilmFour, Ciby 2000, Le Studio Canal+ and Canal+
November 24, 1999	Toy Story 2	co-production with Pixar Animation Studios; winner of the Golden Globe Award for Best Motion Picture – Musical or Comedy
December 17, 1999	Fantasia 2000	co-production with Walt Disney Feature Animation

=== 2000s ===
Release date	Title	Notes
February 11, 2000	The Tigger Movie	co-production with Walt Disney Television Animation
March 10, 2000	Whispers: An Elephant's Tale	
May 19, 2000	Dinosaur	co-production with Walt Disney Feature Animation and The Secret Lab
July 7, 2000	The Kid	co-production with Junction Entertainment
August 8, 2000	Buzz Lightyear of Star Command: The Adventure Begins ‡	co-production with Walt Disney Television Animation and Pixar Animation Studios
September 19, 2000	The Little Mermaid II: Return to the Sea ‡	co-production with Walt Disney Television Animation
September 29, 2000	Remember the Titans	co-production with Jerry Bruckheimer Films and Technical Black Films
November 22, 2000	102 Dalmatians	
December 15, 2000	The Emperor's New Groove	co-production with Walt Disney Feature Animation
February 16, 2001	Recess: School's Out	co-production with Walt Disney Television Animation and Paul & Joe Productions
February 27, 2001	Lady and the Tramp II: Scamp's Adventure ‡	co-production with Walt Disney Television Animation
June 15, 2001	Atlantis: The Lost Empire	co-production with Walt Disney Feature Animation
August 3, 2001	The Princess Diaries	co-production with BrownHouse Productions
October 5, 2001	Max Keeble's Big Move	co-production with Karz Entertainment
November 2, 2001	Monsters, Inc.	co-production with Pixar Animation Studios; nominee of the Academy Award for Best Animated Feature
November 6, 2001	Mickey's Magical Christmas: Snowed in at the House of Mouse ‡	co-production with Walt Disney Television Animation
January 18, 2002	Snow Dogs	co-production with The Kerner Entertainment Company
February 15, 2002	Return to Never Land	co-production with Walt Disney Television Animation
February 26, 2002	Cinderella II: Dreams Come True ‡	co-production with Walt Disney Television Animation
March 19, 2002	The Hunchback of Notre Dame II ‡	co-production with Walt Disney Television Animation
March 29, 2002	The Rookie	co-production with Gran Via Productions
June 21, 2002	Lilo & Stitch	co-production with Walt Disney Feature Animation
July 26, 2002	The Country Bears	co-production with Gunn Films
October 11, 2002	Tuck Everlasting	co-production with Scholastic Entertainment
November 1, 2002	The Santa Clause 2	co-production with Outlaw Productions and Boxing Cat Films
November 12, 2002	A Very Merry Pooh Year ‡	co-production with Walt Disney Television Animation
November 27, 2002	Treasure Planet	co-production with Walt Disney Feature Animation
January 21, 2003	101 Dalmatians II: Patch's London Adventure ‡	co-production with Walt Disney Television Animation
February 14, 2003	The Jungle Book 2	co-production with Disneytoon Studios
March 11, 2003	Inspector Gadget 2 ‡	co-production with The Kerner Entertainment Company
March 21, 2003	Piglet's Big Movie	co-production with Disneytoon Studios
April 11, 2003	Ghosts of the Abyss	North American, U.K. and Irish distribution only; produced by Walden Media, Earthship Productions, Ascot Elite Entertainment Group, Golden Village, Telepool and UGC P.H.
April 18, 2003	Holes	distribution outside Portugal, Greece, the CIS, the Benelux and Turkey only; co-production with Walden Media, Phoenix Pictures and Chicago Pacific Entertainment
May 2, 2003	The Lizzie McGuire Movie	co-production with Stan Rogow Productions;
May 30, 2003	Finding Nemo	co-production with Pixar Animation Studios; winner of the Academy Award for Best Animated Feature and nominee of the Golden Globe Award for Best Motion Picture – Musical or Comedy
July 9, 2003	Pirates of the Caribbean: The Curse of the Black Pearl	co-production with Jerry Bruckheimer Films
August 6, 2003	Freaky Friday	co-production with Gunn Films
August 26, 2003	Stitch! The Movie ‡	co-production with Walt Disney Television Animation
October 21, 2003	George of the Jungle 2 ‡	co-production with The Kerner Entertainment Company
November 1, 2003	Brother Bear	co-production with Walt Disney Feature Animation
November 26, 2003	The Haunted Mansion	co-production with Gunn Films
December 25, 2003	The Young Black Stallion	co-production with The Kennedy/Marshall Company
January 16, 2004	Teacher's Pet	co-production with Walt Disney Television Animation
February 6, 2004	Miracle	co-production with Mayhem Pictures
February 10, 2004	The Lion King 1½ ‡	co-production with Disneytoon Studios
February 20, 2004	Confessions of a Teenage Drama Queen	
March 9, 2004	Springtime with Roo ‡	co-production with Disneytoon Studios
April 2, 2004	Home on the Range	co-production with Walt Disney Feature Animation
April 22, 2004	Sacred Planet	
June 16, 2004	Around the World in 80 Days	North American distribution only; produced by Walden Media, Spanknyce Films, and Mostow/Lieberman Productions
July 2, 2004	America's Heart and Soul	co-production with Blacklight Films
August 11, 2004	The Princess Diaries 2: Royal Engagement	co-production with Shondaland and Martin Chase Productions
August 17, 2004	Mickey, Donald, Goofy: The Three Musketeers ‡	co-production with Disneytoon Studios
November 5, 2004	The Incredibles	co-production with Pixar Animation Studios; winner of the Academy Award for Best Animated Feature and nominee of the Golden Globe Award for Best Motion Picture – Musical or Comedy; Inducted into the National Film Registry in 2025
November 9, 2004	Mickey's Twice Upon a Christmas ‡	co-production with Disneytoon Studios
November 19, 2004	National Treasure	co-production with Jerry Bruckheimer Films, Junction Entertainment and Saturn Films
January 28, 2005	Aliens of the Deep	co-production with Walden Media and Earthship Productions
February 1, 2005	Mulan II ‡	co-production with Disneytoon Studios
February 11, 2005	Pooh's Heffalump Movie	co-production with Disneytoon Studios
March 4, 2005	The Pacifier	co-production with Spyglass Entertainment and Offspring Entertainment
March 18, 2005	Ice Princess	co-production with Bridget Johnson Films & Skate Away Productions
June 14, 2005	Tarzan II ‡	co-production with Disneytoon Studios and Toon City Animation
June 22, 2005	Herbie: Fully Loaded	co-production with Robert Simonds Productions
July 29, 2005	Sky High	co-production with Gunn Films
August 19, 2005	Valiant	North American distribution only; produced by Vanguard Animation and Odyssey Entertainment
August 30, 2005	Lilo & Stitch 2: Stitch Has a Glitch ‡	co-production with Disneytoon Studios
September 13, 2005	Pooh's Heffalump Halloween Movie ‡	co-production with Disneytoon Studios
September 30, 2005	The Greatest Game Ever Played	co-production with Fairway Films
November 4, 2005	Chicken Little	co-production with Walt Disney Feature Animation
December 9, 2005	The Chronicles of Narnia: The Lion, the Witch and the Wardrobe	co-production with Walden Media
December 13, 2005	Kronk's New Groove ‡	co-production with Disneytoon Studios
January 13, 2006	Glory Road	co-production with Jerry Bruckheimer Films, Texas Western Productions and Glory Road Productions
January 27, 2006	Roving Mars	co-production with The Kennedy/Marshall Company and White Mountain Films
February 7, 2006 (Note: Direct-to-video film. Theatrical release outside of North America on January 26, 2006, except for the United Kingdom, China, Japan and Taiwan.)	Bambi II	co-production with Disneytoon Studios
February 17, 2006	Eight Below	co-production with Spyglass Entertainment, Mandeville Films and The Kennedy/Marshall Company
March 10, 2006	The Shaggy Dog	co-production with Mandeville Films, Tollin/Robbins Productions, Boxing Cat Films, Robert Simonds Productions and Shaggy Dog Productions
April 14, 2006	The Wild	co-production with C.O.R.E. Feature Animation, Hoytyboy Pictures, Sir Zip Productions and Contrafilm
June 9, 2006	Cars	co-production with Pixar Animation Studios; winner of the Golden Globe Award for Best Animated Feature Film and nominee of the Academy Award for Best Animated Feature
June 27, 2006	Leroy & Stitch ‡	co-production with Walt Disney Television Animation
July 7, 2006	Pirates of the Caribbean: Dead Man's Chest	co-production with Jerry Bruckheimer Films
August 25, 2006	Invincible	co-production with Mayhem Pictures
August 29, 2006	Brother Bear 2 ‡	co-production with Disneytoon Studios
October 20, 2006	The Nightmare Before Christmas 3D	co-production with Skellington Productions (Note: Released under the Touchstone Pictures label in its original 1993 release, and rebranded as a Walt Disney Pictures film for the 2006 reissue.); Inducted into the National Film Registry in 2023
November 3, 2006	The Santa Clause 3: The Escape Clause	co-production with Outlaw Productions & Boxing Cat Productions
December 12, 2006	The Fox and the Hound 2 ‡	co-production with Disneytoon Studios
February 6, 2007	Cinderella III: A Twist in Time ‡	co-production with Disneytoon Studios
February 16, 2007	Bridge to Terabithia	North American, Australian and New Zealand distribution only; produced by Walden Media
March 30, 2007	Meet the Robinsons	co-production with Walt Disney Animation Studios
May 25, 2007	Pirates of the Caribbean: At World's End	co-production with Jerry Bruckheimer Films
June 29, 2007	Ratatouille	co-production with Pixar Animation Studios; winner of the Academy Award for Best Animated Feature and the Golden Globe Award for Best Animated Feature Film
June 29, 2007	The Secret of the Magic Gourd *	Chinese film; co-production with Centro Digital Pictures Limited (Note: Theatrical release only in China. Direct-to-video release in the United States on January 27, 2009.)
August 3, 2007	Underdog	co-production with Spyglass Entertainment, Classic Media and Maverick Films
August 28, 2007	The Pixar Story	co-production with Leslie Iwerks Productions
September 28, 2007	The Game Plan	co-production with Mayhem Pictures
November 21, 2007	Enchanted	co-production with Right Coast Productions, Josephson Entertainment and Andalasia Productions
December 21, 2007	National Treasure: Book of Secrets	co-production with Jerry Bruckheimer Films, Junction Entertainment and Saturn Films
February 1, 2008	Hannah Montana and Miley Cyrus: Best of Both Worlds Concert	co-production with PACE
February 5, 2008	Snow Buddies ‡	distribution only; produced by Keystone Entertainment
March 7, 2008	College Road Trip	co-production with Gunn Films
May 16, 2008	The Chronicles of Narnia: Prince Caspian	co-production with Walden Media
June 27, 2008	WALL-E	co-production with Pixar Animation Studios; winner of the Academy Award for Best Animated Feature and the Golden Globe Award for Best Animated Feature Film; Inducted into the National Film Registry in 2021
July 17, 2008	High School Musical: el desafío *	Argentinian film; co-production with Patagonik and Artear Argentina
August 26, 2008	The Little Mermaid: Ariel's Beginning ‡	co-production with Disneytoon Studios
September 5, 2008	High School Musical: el desafío *	Mexican film; co-production with Patagonik and TV Azteca
October 3, 2008	Beverly Hills Chihuahua	co-production with Mandeville Films
October 17, 2008	Morning Light	
October 24, 2008	High School Musical 3: Senior Year	co-production with Borden and Rosenbush Entertainment
October 24, 2008	Roadside Romeo *	Indian film; co-production with Yash Raj Films; distributed by Yash Raj Films
October 28, 2008 (Note: Limited theatrical release on September 18, 2008. Direct-to-video release on October 28, 2008.)	Tinker Bell	co-production with Disneytoon Studios
November 21, 2008	Bolt	co-production with Walt Disney Animation Studios; nominee of the Academy Award for Best Animated Feature and the Golden Globe Award for Best Animated Feature Film
December 25, 2008	Bedtime Stories	co-production with Gunn Films, Happy Madison Productions, Offspring Entertainment and Conman & Izzy Productions
February 3, 2009	Space Buddies ‡	distribution only; produced by Keystone Entertainment
February 27, 2009	Jonas Brothers: The 3D Concert Experience	co-production with Jonas Films
March 13, 2009	Race to Witch Mountain	co-production with Gunn Films
April 10, 2009	Hannah Montana: The Movie	co-production with It's a Laugh Productions and Millar Gough Ink
April 22, 2009	Earth	North and Latin American and Italian distribution only; Disneynature release; produced by BBC Natural History Unit, BBC Worldwide, Discovery Channel and Greenlight Media AG
May 8, 2009	Trail of the Panda *	Chinese film; co-production with Castle Hero Pictures
May 22, 2009	The Boys: The Sherman Brothers' Story	co-production with Crescendo Productions, Red Hour Films and Traveling Light
May 29, 2009	Up	co-production with Pixar Animation Studios; winner of the Academy Award for Best Animated Feature and the Golden Globe Award for Best Animated Feature Film, nominee of the Academy Award for Best Picture
June 12, 2009	Lilly the Witch: The Dragon and the Magic Book *	German film; German, Austrian, Spanish and Italian distribution only; co-production with blue eyes Fiction, Trixter, Dor Film, Steinweg Emotion Pictures, Buena Vista International Film Production (Germany) and Babelsberg Film
July 24, 2009	G-Force	co-production with Jerry Bruckheimer Films
August 14, 2009	Ponyo	North American distribution only; produced by Studio Ghibli
September 30, 2009	SpangaS op Survival *	Dutch film; distribution only; produced by Nijenhuis & de Levita Film & TV and NCRV
October 27, 2009 (Note: Limited theatrical release on September 3, 2009 in Argentina. Direct-to-video release on October 27, 2009.)	Tinker Bell and the Lost Treasure	co-production with Disneytoon Studios
October 29, 2009	The Book of Masters *	Russian film; co-production with Trite
November 6, 2009	Disney's A Christmas Carol	co-production with ImageMovers Digital
November 24, 2009	Santa Buddies ‡	distribution only; produced by Keystone Entertainment
November 25, 2009	Old Dogs	co-production with Tapestry Films
December 11, 2009	The Princess and the Frog	co-production with Walt Disney Animation Studios; nominee of the Academy Award for Best Animated Feature and the Golden Globe Award for Best Animated Feature Film

=== 2010s ===
Release date	Title	Notes
February 5, 2010	High School Musical: O Desafio *	Brazilian film; co-production with Total Entertainment
March 5, 2010	Alice in Wonderland	co-production with The Zanuck Company, Roth Films and Team Todd; nominee of the Golden Globe Award for Best Motion Picture – Musical or Comedy
April 22, 2010	Oceans	North American distribution only; Disneynature release; produced by Participant Media, Pathé, Gatetee Films, Canal+, France 2 Cinéma, France 3 Cinéma, Notro Films, JMH-TSR, France Télévisions, TPS Star, Centre National de la Cinématogrpahie, Procirep and Angoa-Agicoa Movies
May 28, 2010	Prince of Persia: The Sands of Time	co-production with Jerry Bruckheimer Films
June 18, 2010	Toy Story 3	co-production with Pixar Animation Studios; winner of the Academy Award for Best Animated Feature and the Golden Globe Award for Best Animated Feature Film, nominee of the Academy Award for Best Picture
July 14, 2010	The Sorcerer's Apprentice	co-production with Jerry Bruckheimer Films, Saturn Films and Broken Road Productions
September 7, 2010	The Crimson Wing: Mystery of the Flamingos	Disneynature release; produced by Kudos Pictures, Kudos Film and Television and Natural Light Films
September 21, 2010 (Note: Limited theatrical release on August 13, 2010 in the United Kingdom. Direct-to-video release on September 21, 2010.)	Tinker Bell and the Great Fairy Rescue	co-production with Disneytoon Studios
October 6, 2010	Fuchsia the Mini-Witch *	Dutch film; distribution only; produced by NL Film & TV and Katholieke Radio Omroep
October 8, 2010	Secretariat	co-production with Mayhem Pictures
October 8, 2010	Do Dooni Chaar *	co-production with Planman Motion Pictures and Disney India
November 23, 2010	The Search for Santa Paws ‡	distribution only; produced by Keystone Entertainment
November 24, 2010	Tangled	co-production with Walt Disney Animation Studios; nominee of the Golden Globe Award for Best Animated Feature Film
December 17, 2010	Tron: Legacy	co-production with Sean Bailey Productions
January 21, 2011	Once Upon A Warrior *	co-production with A Bellyful of Dreams Entertainment, Arka Media Works and Disney India
February 1, 2011	Beverly Hills Chihuahua 2 ‡	
March 11, 2011	Mars Needs Moms	co-production with ImageMovers Digital; final ImageMovers Digital film
April 22, 2011	Zokkomon *	co-production with Disney India
April 22, 2011	African Cats	Disneynature release; produced by Fothergill/Scholey Productions and Silverback Films
April 29, 2011	Prom	
May 20, 2011	Pirates of the Caribbean: On Stranger Tides	co-production with Jerry Bruckheimer Films
June 24, 2011	Cars 2	co-production with Pixar Animation Studios; nominee of the Golden Globe Award for Best Animated Feature Film
July 15, 2011	Winnie the Pooh	co-production with Walt Disney Animation Studios
September 20, 2011	Spooky Buddies ‡	co-production with Key Pix Productions
November 23, 2011	The Muppets	co-production with Mandeville Films
January 31, 2012	Treasure Buddies ‡	co-production with Key Pix Productions
February 17, 2012	The Secret World of Arrietty	North American distribution only; produced by Studio Ghibli
March 9, 2012	John Carter	
April 20, 2012	Chimpanzee	Disneynature release; produced by Great Ape Productions
May 25, 2012	Arjun: The Warrior Prince *	co-production with Disney India and UTV Motion Pictures
June 22, 2012	Brave	co-production with Pixar Animation Studios; winner of the Academy Award for Best Animated Feature and the Golden Globe Award for Best Animated Feature Film
August 15, 2012	The Odd Life of Timothy Green	co-production with Monsterfoot Productions and Scott Sanders Productions
September 18, 2012	Beverly Hills Chihuahua 3: Viva la Fiesta! ‡	distributed by Walt Disney Studios Home Entertainment
October 5, 2012	Frankenweenie	co-production with Tim Burton Productions; nominee of the Academy Award for Best Animated Feature and the Golden Globe Award for Best Animated Feature Film
October 23, 2012 (Note: Limited theatrical release on August 31, 2012 in the United States and on August 16, 2012 in Ukraine. Direct-to-video release on October 23, 2012.)	Secret of the Wings	co-production with Disneytoon Studios
November 2, 2012	Wreck-It Ralph	co-production with Walt Disney Animation Studios; nominee of the Academy Award for Best Animated Feature and the Golden Globe Award for Best Animated Feature Film
March 8, 2013	Oz the Great and Powerful	co-production with Roth Films and Curtis-Donen Productions
April 16, 2013	Wings of Life	Disneynature release; produced by Blacklight Films
June 21, 2013	Monsters University	co-production with Pixar Animation Studios
July 3, 2013	The Lone Ranger	co-production with Jerry Bruckheimer Films, Blind Wink and Infinitum Nihil
August 9, 2013	Planes	co-production with Disneytoon Studios
August 27, 2013	Super Buddies ‡	co-production with Key Pix Productions
November 27, 2013	Frozen	co-production with Walt Disney Animation Studios; winner of the Academy Award for Best Animated Feature
December 13, 2013	Saving Mr. Banks	co-production with BBC Films, Essential Media and Entertainment, Ruby Films, and Hopscotch Features
March 21, 2014	Muppets Most Wanted	co-production with Mandeville Films
April 1, 2014 (Note: Theatrical release internationally on February 13, 2014. Direct-to-video release in the United States on April 1, 2014.)	The Pirate Fairy	co-production with Disneytoon Studios
April 18, 2014	Bears	Disneynature release; produced by Silverback Films
May 16, 2014	Million Dollar Arm	co-production with Roth Films and Mayhem Pictures
May 30, 2014	Maleficent	co-production with Roth Films
July 18, 2014	Planes: Fire & Rescue	co-production with Disneytoon Studios
September 19, 2014	Khoobsurat *	co-production with UTV Motion Pictures, Disney India and Anil Kapoor Films
October 10, 2014	Alexander and the Terrible, Horrible, No Good, Very Bad Day	co-production with 21 Laps Entertainment and The Jim Henson Company
November 7, 2014	Big Hero 6	co-production with Walt Disney Animation Studios; winner of the Academy Award for Best Animated Feature and nominee of the Golden Globe Award for Best Animated Feature Film
December 25, 2014	Into the Woods	co-production with Lucamar Productions and Marc Platt Productions; nominee of the Golden Globe Award for Best Motion Picture – Musical or Comedy
February 20, 2015	McFarland, USA	co-production with Mayhem Pictures
March 3, 2015 (Note: Theatrical release internationally and limited theatrical release in the United Kingdom on December 12, 2014. Direct-to-video release on March 3, 2015.)	Tinker Bell and the Legend of the NeverBeast	co-production with Disneytoon Studios; final Disneytoon Studios film
March 13, 2015	Cinderella	co-production with Kinberg Genre, Allison Shearmur Productions and Beagle Pug Films
April 17, 2015	Monkey Kingdom	Disneynature release; produced by Silverback Films
May 22, 2015	Tomorrowland	co-production with A113 Productions
June 19, 2015	Inside Out	co-production with Pixar Animation Studios; winner of the Academy Award for Best Animated Feature and the Golden Globe Award for Best Animated Feature Film
June 19, 2015	ABCD 2 *	co-production with UTV Motion Pictures and Disney India
November 25, 2015	The Good Dinosaur	co-production with Pixar Animation Studios; nominee of the Golden Globe Award for Best Animated Feature Film
January 29, 2016	The Finest Hours	co-production with Whitaker Entertainment and Red Hawk Entertainment
March 4, 2016	Zootopia	co-production with Walt Disney Animation Studios; winner of the Academy Award for Best Animated Feature and the Golden Globe Award for Best Animated Feature Film
April 15, 2016	The Jungle Book	co-production with Fairview Entertainment
May 6, 2016	Tini: The Movie *	co-production with Gloriamundi Producciones and Lapis Films
May 27, 2016	Alice Through the Looking Glass	co-production with Roth Films, Team Todd and Tim Burton Productions
June 17, 2016	Finding Dory	co-production with Pixar Animation Studios
July 1, 2016	The BFG	distribution outside India, China and EMEA only; co-production with Amblin Entertainment, Reliance Entertainment, Walden Media, The Kennedy/Marshall Company and The Roald Dahl Story Company
August 12, 2016	Pete's Dragon	co-production with Whitaker Entertainment
September 30, 2016	Queen of Katwe	co-production with ESPN Films, Cine Mosaic and Mirabai Films
November 23, 2016	Moana	co-production with Walt Disney Animation Studios; nominee of the Academy Award for Best Animated Feature and the Golden Globe Award for Best Animated Feature Film
December 6, 2016	Growing Up Wild	Disneynature release; produced by Silverback Films
December 21, 2016	Dangal *	co-production with Disney India, UTV Motion Pictures and Aamir Khan Productions
February 15, 2017	March of the Penguins 2: The Next Step	Disneynature release; produced by Bonne Pioche Cinéma, Paprika Films, Wild-Touch Productions, OCS, France 3 Cinéma and Hulu Originals (Note: Distributed by Walt Disney Studios Motion Pictures in France. It was subsequently released exclusively on Hulu in the U.S.)
March 17, 2017	Beauty and the Beast	co-production with Mandeville Films
April 21, 2017	Born in China	Disneynature release; produced by Shanghai Media Group, Chuan Films and Brian Leith Productions
May 26, 2017	Pirates of the Caribbean: Dead Men Tell No Tales	co-production with Jerry Bruckheimer Films
June 16, 2017	Cars 3	co-production with Pixar Animation Studios
June 30, 2017	Ghost of the Mountains	Disneynature release; produced by Netflix Original Documentaries and Brian Leith Productions
July 14, 2017	Jagga Jasoos *	co-production with Disney India, UTV Motion Pictures, Picture Shuru Entertainment and Ishana Movies
October 29, 2017	The Last Warrior *	Russian film; co-production with Yellow, Black & White
November 22, 2017	Coco	co-production with Pixar Animation Studios; winner of the Academy Award for Best Animated Feature and the Golden Globe Award for Best Animated Feature Film
December 27, 2017	Expedition China	Disneynature release; produced by Netflix Original Documentaries and Brian Leith Productions
March 9, 2018	A Wrinkle in Time	co-production with Whitaker Entertainment
June 15, 2018	Incredibles 2	co-production with Pixar Animation Studios; nominee of the Academy Award for Best Animated Feature and the Golden Globe Award for Best Animated Feature Film
August 3, 2018	Christopher Robin	co-production with 2DUX²
November 2, 2018	The Nutcracker and the Four Realms	co-production with The Mark Gordon Company
November 21, 2018	Ralph Breaks the Internet	co-production with Walt Disney Animation Studios; nominee of the Academy Award for Best Animated Feature and the Golden Globe Award for Best Animated Feature Film
December 19, 2018	Mary Poppins Returns	co-production with Lucamar Productions and Marc Platt Productions; nominee of the Golden Globe Award for Best Motion Picture – Musical or Comedy
March 29, 2019	Dumbo	co-production with Tim Burton Productions, Infinite Detective Productions and Secret Machine Entertainment
April 17, 2019	Penguins	Disneynature release; produced by Silverback Films
May 24, 2019	Aladdin	co-production with Rideback
June 21, 2019	Toy Story 4	co-production with Pixar Animation Studios; winner of the Academy Award for Best Animated Feature and nominee of the Golden Globe Award for Best Animated Feature Film
July 19, 2019	The Lion King	co-production with Fairview Entertainment; nominee of the Golden Globe Award for Best Animated Feature Film
October 18, 2019	Maleficent: Mistress of Evil	co-production with Roth/Kirschenbaum Films
November 12, 2019	Lady and the Tramp ‡	co-production with Taylor Made; distributed by Disney+
November 12, 2019	Noelle ‡	distributed by Disney+
November 22, 2019	Frozen 2	co-production with Walt Disney Animation Studios; nominee of the Golden Globe Award for Best Animated Feature Film
December 20, 2019	Togo ‡	distributed by Disney+

=== 2020s ===
Release date	Title	Notes
February 7, 2020	Timmy Failure: Mistakes Were Made ‡	co-production with Etalon Films, Slow Pony Pictures and Whitaker Entertainment; distributed by Disney+
March 6, 2020	Onward	co-production with Pixar Animation Studios; nominee of the Academy Award for Best Animated Feature and the Golden Globe Award for Best Animated Feature Film
March 13, 2020	Stargirl ‡	co-production with Gotham Group and Hahnscape Entertainment; distributed by Disney+
April 3, 2020	Dolphin Reef ‡	Disneynature release; distributed by Disney+
April 3, 2020	Elephant ‡	Disneynature release; distributed by Disney+
June 12, 2020	Artemis Fowl ‡	co-production with TriBeCa Productions, Marzano Films and TKBC; distributed by Disney+
July 3, 2020	Hamilton ‡	co-production with 5000 Broadway Productions, Nevis Productions, Old 320 Sycamore Pictures and RadicalMedia; distributed by Disney+; nominee of the Golden Globe Award for Best Motion Picture – Musical or Comedy; Released theatrically in 2025.
July 31, 2020	Black Is King ‡	co-production with Parkwood Entertainment; distributed by Disney+
August 14, 2020	Magic Camp ‡	co-production with Team Todd; distributed by Disney+
August 21, 2020	The One and Only Ivan ‡	co-production with Jolie Pas Productions and Allison Shearmur Productions; distributed by Disney+
September 4, 2020	Mulan †	co-production with Jason T. Reed Productions and Good Fear Productions; distributed by Disney+
December 4, 2020	Godmothered ‡	co-production with The Montecito Picture Company; distributed by Disney+
December 11, 2020	Safety ‡	co-production with Mayhem Pictures and Select Films; distributed by Disney+
December 25, 2020	Soul ‡	co-production with Pixar Animation Studios; distributed by Disney+; winner of the Academy Award for Best Animated Feature and the Golden Globe Award for Best Animated Feature Film
January 1, 2021	The Last Warrior: Root of Evil *	Russian film; co-production with Yellow, Black & White, Cinema Fund Russia and Russia-1
February 19, 2021	Flora & Ulysses ‡	co-production with Netter Productions; distributed by Disney+
March 5, 2021	Raya and the Last Dragon §	co-production with Walt Disney Animation Studios; nominee of the Academy Award for Best Animated Feature and the Golden Globe Award for Best Animated Feature Film
May 28, 2021	Cruella §	co-production with Gunn Films and Marc Platt Productions
June 18, 2021	Luca ‡	co-production with Pixar Animation Studios; distributed by Disney+; nominee of the Academy Award for Best Animated Feature and the Golden Globe Award for Best Animated Feature Film
July 30, 2021	Jungle Cruise §	co-production with Davis Entertainment, Flynn Picture Company and Seven Bucks Productions
November 24, 2021	Encanto	co-production with Walt Disney Animation Studios; winner of the Academy Award for Best Animated Feature and Golden Globe Award for Best Animated Feature Film
December 3, 2021	Diary of a Wimpy Kid ‡	co-production with Bardel Entertainment; distributed by Disney+ (Note: The film was originally in-production at 20th Century Studios, but was switched over to Walt Disney Pictures during production.)
December 23, 2021	The Last Warrior: A Messenger of Darkness *	Russian film; co-production with Disney CIS and Yellow, Black & White
January 28, 2022	The Ice Age Adventures of Buck Wild ‡	co-production with Bardel Entertainment; distributed by Disney+
January 30, 2022	The Beatles: Get Back – The Rooftop Concert	co-production with Apple Corps Ltd. and WingNut Films; limited IMAX engagement
March 11, 2022	Turning Red ‡	co-production with Pixar Animation Studios; distributed by Disney+; nominee of the Academy Award for Best Animated Feature and the Golden Globe Award for Best Animated Feature Film
March 18, 2022	Cheaper by the Dozen ‡	co-production with Khalabo Ink Society; distributed by Disney+
April 1, 2022	Better Nate Than Ever ‡	co-production with Marc Platt Productions; distributed by Disney+
April 22, 2022	Polar Bear ‡	Disneynature release; distributed by Disney+
May 20, 2022	Chip 'n Dale: Rescue Rangers ‡	co-production with Mandeville Films; distributed by Disney+
June 3, 2022	Hollywood Stargirl ‡	co-production with Gotham Group and Hahnscape Entertainment; distributed by Disney+
June 17, 2022	Lightyear	co-production with Pixar Animation Studios
June 24, 2022	Rise ‡	co-production with Faliro House Productions; distributed by Disney+
September 8, 2022	Pinocchio ‡	co-production with ImageMovers and Depth of Field Studios; distributed by Disney+
September 30, 2022	Hocus Pocus 2 ‡	co-production with David Kirschner Productions and Weimaraner Republic Pictures; distributed by Disney+
November 18, 2022	Disenchanted ‡	co-production with Right Coast Productions, Josephson Entertainment and Andalasia Productions; distributed by Disney+
November 23, 2022	Strange World	co-production with Walt Disney Animation Studios
December 2, 2022	Diary of a Wimpy Kid: Rodrick Rules ‡	co-production with Bardel Entertainment; distributed by Disney+
December 9, 2022	Night at the Museum: Kahmunrah Rises Again ‡	co-production with 21 Laps Entertainment, Alibaba Pictures and Atomic Cartoons; distributed by Disney+
March 10, 2023	Chang Can Dunk ‡	co-production with Hillman Grad Productions and Makeready; distributed by Disney+
April 28, 2023	Peter Pan & Wendy ‡	co-production with Whitaker Entertainment and Roth/Kirschenbaum Films; distributed by Disney+
May 12, 2023	Crater ‡	co-production with 21 Laps Entertainment; distributed by Disney+
May 26, 2023	The Little Mermaid	co-production with DeLuca Marshall and Marc Platt Productions
June 16, 2023	Elemental	co-production with Pixar Animation Studios; nominee of the Academy Award for Best Animated Feature and the Golden Globe Award for Best Animated Feature Film
June 23, 2023	World's Best ‡	distributed by Disney+
June 30, 2023	Indiana Jones and the Dial of Destiny	co-production with Lucasfilm
July 28, 2023	Haunted Mansion	co-production with Rideback
November 17, 2023	Dashing Through the Snow ‡	co-production with Will Packer Productions and Smart Entertainment; distributed by Disney+
November 22, 2023	Wish	co-production with Walt Disney Animation Studios; nominee of the Golden Globe Award for Best Animated Feature Film
December 8, 2023	Diary of a Wimpy Kid Christmas: Cabin Fever ‡	co-production with Bardel Entertainment; distributed by Disney+
April 22, 2024	Tiger ‡	Disneynature release; distributed by Disney+
May 24, 2024	The Beach Boys ‡	co-production with K/M Documentaries, White Horse Pictures, Iconic Artists Group and Diamond Docs; distributed by Disney+
May 31, 2024	Young Woman and the Sea	co-production with Jerry Bruckheimer Films
June 14, 2024	Inside Out 2	co-production with Pixar Animation Studios; nominee of the Academy Award for Best Animated Feature and the Golden Globe Award for Best Animated Feature Film
October 4, 2024	Blink	North American co-distribution with National Geographic Documentary Films only; produced by MRC, Fishbowl Films and EyeSteelFilm
November 27, 2024	Moana 2	co-production with Walt Disney Animation Studios; nominee of the Golden Globe Award for Best Animated Feature Film
December 20, 2024	Mufasa: The Lion King	
March 21, 2025	Snow White	co-production with Marc Platt Productions
March 28, 2025	Alexander and the Terrible, Horrible, No Good, Very Bad Road Trip ‡	co-production with 21 Laps Entertainment and The Jim Henson Company; distributed by Disney+
April 22, 2025	Sea Lions of the Galapagos ‡	Disneynature release; distributed by Disney+
May 23, 2025	Lilo & Stitch	co-production with Rideback
June 20, 2025	Elio	co-production with Pixar Animation Studios; nominee of the Academy Award for Best Animated Feature and the Golden Globe Award for Best Animated Feature Film
August 8, 2025	Freakier Friday	co-production with Gunn Films and Burr! Productions
October 10, 2025	Tron: Ares	co-production with Sean Bailey Productions
November 26, 2025	Zootopia 2	co-production with Walt Disney Animation Studios; nominee of the Academy Award for Best Animated Feature and the Golden Globe Award for Best Animated Feature Film
December 5, 2025	Diary of a Wimpy Kid: The Last Straw ‡	distributed by Disney+
March 6, 2026	Hoppers	co-production with Pixar Animation Studios
April 22, 2026	Orangutan ‡	Disneynature release; distributed by Disney+
June 19, 2026	Toy Story 5	co-production with Pixar Animation Studios
July 10, 2026	Moana	co-production with Seven Bucks Productions, Flynn Picture Co. and 5000 Broadway Productions

== Upcoming ==
Release date	Title	Notes	Production Status
November 25, 2026	Hexed	co-production with Walt Disney Animation Studios	Completed
December 4, 2026	Diary of a Wimpy Kid Christmas: The Getaway ‡	distributed by Disney+	Completed
February 12, 2027	Untitled film		TBA
March 5, 2027	Gatto	co-production with Pixar Animation Studios	In production
April 2, 2027	Untitled film		TBA
April 22, 2027	Wolf ‡	Disneynature release; distributed by Disney+	Post-production
May 28, 2027	Untitled films		TBA
June 18, 2027	Untitled films		TBA
August 6, 2027	The Bluey Movie	distribution only; produced by Ludo Studio and BBC Studios	In production
September 17, 2027	Untitled films		TBA
October 8, 2027	Untitled films		TBA
November 24, 2027	Frozen 3	co-production with Walt Disney Animation Studios	In production
February 18, 2028	Untitled film		TBA
March 10, 2028	Ghost Market	co-production with Pixar Animation Studios	In production
March 31, 2028	Tangled	co-production with Burr! Productions	Post-production
May 26, 2028	Lilo & Stitch 2	co-production with Rideback	Filming
June 16, 2028	Incredibles 3	co-production with Pixar Animation Studios	In production
November 10, 2028	Untitled film		TBA
November 22, 2028	Clay	co-production with Walt Disney Animation Studios	In production
June 15, 2029	Untitled films	co-production with Walt Disney Animation Studios	TBA
November 21, 2029	Coco 2	co-production with Pixar Animation Studios	In production

=== Undated films ===
Release date	Title	Notes	Production Status
TBA	Princess Diaries 3	co-production with Somewhere Pictures	Pre-production
TBA	Untitled Prince Charming film		Pre-production

=== In development ===
Title	Notes
Big Thunder Mountain Railroad	co-production with LuckyChap Entertainment and Scott Free Productions
Bob The Musical	
Club 33	co-production with 21 Laps Entertainment
The Dallergut Dream Department Store	
Divine Rivals	co-production with Di Bonaventura Pictures
Frozen 4	co-production with Walt Disney Animation Studios
Gaston	
The Graveyard Book	co-production with 2DUX²
Hercules	co-production with AGBO
Hocus Pocus 3	
Impossible Creatures	co-production with Impossible Films
In Real Life	co-production with Counterbalance
Inspector Gadget	co-production with Wildbrain and Rideback
Medusa	co-production with Electro Corduroy Entertainment and Seven Bucks Productions
Merlin	
Molina	co-production with Rideback, Tiara Blu Films and Viajes Miranda
Monster Jam	co-production with Seven Bucks Productions
National Treasure 3	co-production Jerry Bruckheimer Films Junction Entertainment and Saturn Films
One Thousand and One Nights	
Penelope	co-production with Olive Bridge Entertainment
Moana 3	co-production with Walt Disney Animation Studios
Sister Act 3 ‡	distributed by Disney+
Society of Explorers and Adventurers	co-production with Maximum Effort
Space Mountain	co-production with Safehouse Pictures and Rideback
Stepsisters	co-production with Party Over Here
Stolen Wishes	
Tower of Terror	co-production with These Pictures
Treasure Island	
Untitled Cruella sequel	
Untitled Domee Shi musical film	co-production with Pixar Animation Studios
Untitled Figment film	co-production with Point Grey Pictures
Untitled Jane Goodall film	co-production with Appian Way Productions
Untitled third Maleficent film	
Untitled Monsters, Inc. sequel film	co-production with Pixar Animation Studios
Untitled Pirates of the Caribbean spin-off	co-production with Jerry Bruckheimer Films
Untitled sixth Pirates of the Caribbean film	co-production with Jerry Bruckheimer Films
Untitled live-action Princess Tiana film	
Untitled Sleeping Beauty film	
Zootopia 3	co-production with Walt Disney Animation Studios

== See also ==
In-depth lists by other types

- List of Disney feature-length home entertainment releases
- List of Disney television films
- List of Disney theatrical animated feature films
- List of remakes and adaptations of Disney animated films
- List of film adaptations of Disney attractions

Disney-branded labels

- Lists of Walt Disney Studios films

Operating:

- Walt Disney Animation Studios (list)
- Disney Channel Original Movies (list)
- Pixar Animation Studios (list)
- Disneynature

Defunct:

- ImageMovers Digital
- Skellington Productions
- Disneytoon Studios

Other film labels and/or subsidiaries

Operating:

- Marvel Studios (list)
  - Marvel Cinematic Universe (list)
  - Marvel Television
- Lucasfilm Ltd. (list)
- 20th Century Studios (list)
  - Searchlight Pictures (list)
  - 20th Century Animation
- ESPN Films
- Star Studio18

Defunct:

- Hollywood Pictures
- Touchstone Pictures (list)
- ABC Motion Pictures (list)
- ABC Family (list)
- Fox Atomic
- Fox 2000 Pictures
- Blue Sky Studios (list)
- UTV Motion Pictures

Divested (once owned by Disney):

- Miramax (list)
  - Dimension Films (list)

Related lists

- List of Walt Disney Animation Studios short films
- List of Disney television series
