= Paul Webster (producer) =

British film producer (born 1952)

- Born: 19 September 1952 (age 73); United Kingdom
- Occupation: Film producer
- Years active: 1988–present
- Awards: BAFTA Award for Best Film; 2007 Atonement

Paul Webster (born 19 September 1952) is a British film producer.

== Life and career ==
Webster has worked both as an independent, and with several production companies. He worked with Working Title Films for five years, setting up their Los Angeles office. Between 1995 and 1997, he was Head of Production for Miramax Films. In 1998, he joined Channel 4 to create FilmFour. In 2004, he joined Kudos Film and Television, heading their film unit, Kudos Pictures.

Webster was executive producer, along with Robert Redford and Rebecca Yeldham, of the 2004 film The Motorcycle Diaries, directed by Walter Salles, based on Che Guevara's book The Motorcycle Diaries. Webster was nominated for an Academy Award for Best Picture for the 2007 film Atonement, for which he was also nominated for a BAFTA in the category of "Best British Film" and won a BAFTA for "Best Film". He has previously been nominated for a BAFTA and a Genie Award for Best Motion Picture for his work on the 2007 film Eastern Promises. Webster produced the Disneynature documentary on flamingos, The Crimson Wing: Mystery of the Flamingos, released internationally in 2009.

== Filmography ==
He was a producer in all films unless otherwise noted.

=== Film ===
Year	Film	Credit
1988	Dream Demon	
1989	The Tall Guy	
1991	Drop Dead Fred	
1991	Rubin & Ed	
1992	Bob Roberts	Executive producer
1993	Posse	Co-executive producer
1993	Romeo Is Bleeding	
1994	Little Odessa	
1996	The Pallbearer	
1997	Gridlock'd	
1998	Little Voice	Co-executive producer
1999	My Life So Far	Executive producer
2000	The Yards	
2001	Jump Tomorrow	Executive producer
2001	My Brother Tom	Executive producer
2001	Late Night Shopping	Executive producer
2001	The Emperor's New Clothes	Executive producer
2001	Lucky Break	Executive producer
2001	Crush	Executive producer
2001	Invincible	Executive producer
2001	Birthday Girl	Executive producer
2001	Buffalo Soldiers	Executive producer
2001	The Warrior	Executive producer
2001	Dog Eat Dog	Executive producer
2001	Charlotte Gray	Executive producer
2002	Miranda	Executive producer
2002	Once Upon a Time in the Midlands	Executive producer
2003	It's All About Love	Executive producer
2003	The Principles of Lust	Executive producer
2003	To Kill a King	Executive producer
2003	The Actors	Executive producer
2004	The Motorcycle Diaries	Executive producer
2005	Pride & Prejudice	
2007	Atonement	
2007	Eastern Promises	
2008	Miss Pettigrew Lives for a Day	Executive producer
2008	The Crimson Wing: Mystery of the Flamingos	
2010	Brighton Rock	
2011	Salmon Fishing in the Yemen	
2012	Anna Karenina	
2013	Hummingbird	
2013	Locke	
2015	Pan	
2017	God's Own Country	Executive producer
2018	Swimming with Men	Executive producer
2019	Serenity	Executive producer
2019	Radioactive	
2020	Luxor	Executive producer
2021	Spencer	

Production manager

Year	Film	Role	Notes
1996	The English Patient	Head of production: Miramax	Uncredited
1997	Welcome to Sarajevo	Head of production: Miramax	

Miscellaneous crew

Year	Film	Role	Notes
1985	Letter to Brezhnev	Production coordinator	
1999	The War Zone	Chief executive producer: Film4 Productions	Uncredited
1999	East Is East	Chief executive producer: Film4 Productions	Uncredited
2000	Gangster No. 1	Chief executive: Film4 Productions	
2000	Sexy Beast	Chief executive producer: Film4 Productions	

Thanks

Year	Film	Role
1997	The Wings of the Dove	Special thanks
1997	Good Will Hunting	Thanks
1998	The Mighty	Thanks
1998	Hilary and Jackie	Thanks
1998	Shakespeare in Love	Thanks
1999	East Is East	Special thanks
2000	Sexy Beast	Thanks
2007	Son of Rambow	Special thanks
2009	Fish Tank	Thanks
2016	Hands of Stone	Very special thanks

=== Television ===
Year	Title	Credit	Notes
2019	The Cure	Executive producer	Television film

Production manager

Year	Title	Role	Notes
1998	Since You've Been Gone	Executive in charge of production	Television film
