= Harry Gregson-Williams =

British composer (born 1961)

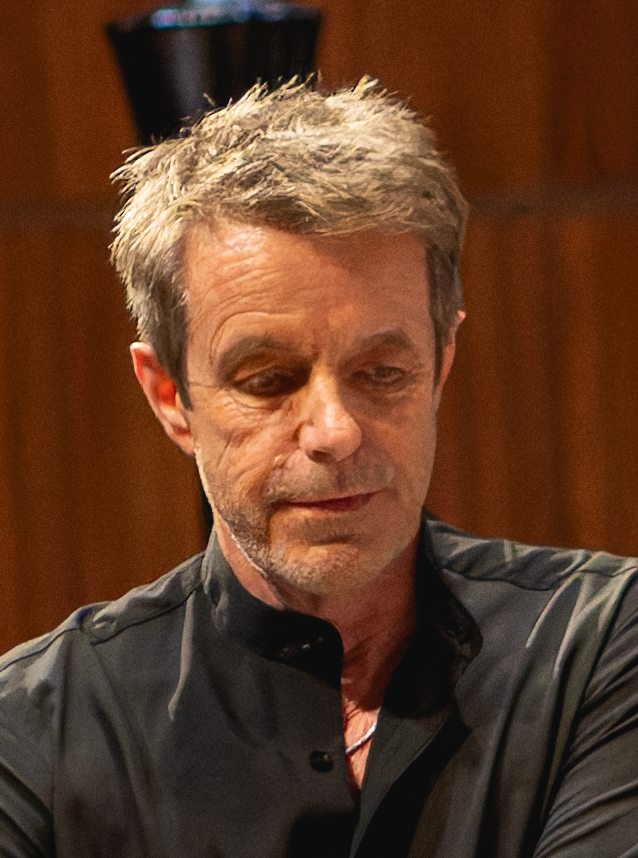
- Gregson-Williams in 2025

Background information
- Born: 13 December 1961 (age 64); Chichester, England
- Genres: Film scores; video game scores; soundtracks; classical rock; jazz rock; electronic rock
- Occupations: Composer; conductor; orchestrator; cameraman
- Instruments: Vocals; piano; keyboards; synthesizer; percussion; guitar
- Years active: 1990–present
- Label: Wavecrest
- Spouse: Malika Gregson-Williams (m. 2024)

Harry Gregson-Williams (born 13 December 1961) is an English composer, conductor, orchestrator, and record producer.

== Education ==
Gregson-Williams won a musical scholarship to St John's College School in Cambridge at the age of seven. He was a child chorister at the school. He later attended Stowe School, an independent boarding school in the civil parish of Stowe in Buckinghamshire, where he was a music scholar. He next went to the Guildhall School of Music and Drama in London.

He learned to play the piano as a child on a Broadwood piano which his father had bought with the winnings from a hundred-to-one bet during the Grand National.

== Career ==
Gregson-Williams has composed music for video games, television and films including the Metal Gear series, Phone Booth, The Chronicles of Narnia: The Lion, the Witch and the Wardrobe and Prince Caspian, X-Men Origins: Wolverine, Team America: World Police, Antz, The Tigger Movie, Chicken Run and its sequel, the first four films of the Shrek franchise, Sinbad: Legend of the Seven Seas, Flushed Away, Arthur Christmas, Early Man, Catch-22, and several films from Scott Free Productions and Jerry Bruckheimer Films. He is also the older brother of fellow composer Rupert Gregson-Williams.

Gregson-Williams collaborated with several film directors such as Ridley Scott, Tony Scott, Andrew Adamson, Ben Affleck, Joel Schumacher, Antoine Fuqua, Niki Caro, Nick Park, and Peter Lord.

== Discography ==
=== Film ===
==== 1990s ====
Year	Title	Director(s)	Studio(s)	Notes
1990	Revenge	Tony Scott	Rastar	Additional music Director's cut
1991	Cold Heaven	Nicolas Roeg	Hemdale	Music associate
1994	White Angel	Chris Jones	Living Spirit Pictures	—N/a
1994	Broken Heart	Matt McConaghy	ITV Yorkshire	Short film
1995	Hotel Paradise	Nicolas Roeg	Westdeutscher Rundfunk	Short film
1995	Three Miles Up	Lesley Manning	—N/a	TV movie
1995	Full Body Massage	Nicolas Roeg	Paramount Television; Showtime Networks	TV movie
1996	The Whole Wide World	Dan Ireland	Sony Pictures Classics	Co-composed with Hans Zimmer
1996	Witness Against Hitler	Betsan Morris Evans	BBC	TV movie
1996	The Rock	Michael Bay	Hollywood Pictures	Music producer with Hans Zimmer; Score composed by Hans Zimmer and Nick Glennie-Smith
1997	Smilla's Sense of Snow	Bille August	Det Danske Filminstitut; Bavaria Film; Constantin Film; Fox Searchlight Pictures (US)	Co-composed with Hans Zimmer
1997	Deceiver	Jonas Pate; Josh Pate	Metro-Goldwyn-Mayer	—N/a
1997	The Borrowers	Peter Hewitt	Working Title Films; PolyGram Filmed Entertainment; Gramercy Pictures	—N/a
1998	The Replacement Killers	Antoine Fuqua	Brillstein Entertainment Partners; Columbia Pictures	—N/a
1998	Antz	Eric Darnell; Tim Johnson	Pacific Data Images; DreamWorks Animation; DreamWorks Pictures	Co-composed with John Powell; First score for an animated film
1998	The Prince of Egypt	Brenda Chapman; Steve Hickner; Simon Wells	DreamWorks Animation; DreamWorks Pictures	As conductor Co-composed with Hans Zimmer for the song number "All I Ever Wanted"
1998	Enemy of the State	Tony Scott	Jerry Bruckheimer Films; Scott Free Productions; Touchstone Pictures	Co-composed with Trevor Rabin
1998	Armageddon	Michael Bay	Touchstone Pictures; Jerry Bruckheimer Films; Valhalla Motion Pictures	Co-composed with Trevor Rabin, Steve Jablonsky, Don L. Harper, Paul Linford and John Van Tongeren
1999	Swing Vote	David Anspaugh	Columbia TriStar Television; ABC	TV movie
1999	The Match	Mick Davis	Gramercy Pictures	—N/a
1999	Light It Up	Craig Bolotin	20th Century Fox	—N/a
1999	Whatever Happened to Harold Smith?	Peter Hewitt	Intermedia	—N/a

==== 2000s ====
Year	Title	Director(s)	Studio(s)	Notes
2000	The Tigger Movie	Jun Falkenstein	Walt Disney Television Animation; Walt Disney Pictures	—N/a
2000	The Magic of Marciano	Tony Barbieri	Outrider Pictures	—N/a
2000	Chicken Run	Peter Lord; Nick Park	Aardman Animations; DreamWorks Animation; DreamWorks Pictures (Worldwide); Pathé (Europe)	As composer and conductor Co-composed with John Powell
2000	King of the Jungle	Seth Zvi Rosenfeld	Urbanworld Films	—N/a
2001	Spy Kids	Robert Rodriguez	Troublemaker Studios; Dimension Films	Co-composed with John Debney, Danny Elfman, Los Lobos, Robert Rodriguez, Heitor Pereira, and Gavin Greenaway
2001	Shrek	Andrew Adamson; Vicky Jenson	PDI/DreamWorks; DreamWorks Animation; DreamWorks Pictures	As composer and conductor Co-composed with John Powell
2001	The Hire	Alejandro González Iñárritu	BMW Films	Segment: "Powder Keg"
2001	Spy Game	Tony Scott	Beacon Pictures; Universal Pictures	—N/a
2002	Passionada	Dan Ireland	Samuel Goldwyn Films	—N/a
2002	Phone Booth	Joel Schumacher	Zucker/Netter; 20th Century Fox	—N/a
2002	The Hire	Tony Scott	BMW Films	Segment: "Beat the Devil"
2003	Sinbad: Legend of the Seven Seas	Tim Johnson; Patrick Gilmore	DreamWorks Animation; DreamWorks Pictures	As composer and conductor
2003	Veronica Guerin	Joel Schumacher	Jerry Bruckheimer Films; Touchstone Pictures	—N/a
2003	The Rundown	Peter Berg	Strike Entertainment; WWE Films; Universal Pictures (North America and Japan); Columbia Pictures (International)	—N/a
2004	Man on Fire	Tony Scott	Scott Free Productions; Regency Enterprises; 20th Century Fox	Co-composed with Lisa Gerrard
2004	Shrek 2	Andrew Adamson; Kelly Asbury; Conrad Vernon	PDI/DreamWorks; DreamWorks Animation; DreamWorks Pictures	As composer and conductor
2004	Return to Sender	Bille August	DEJ Productions	—N/a
2004	Team America: World Police	Trey Parker	Paramount Pictures	Replaced Marc Shaiman
2004	Bridget Jones: The Edge of Reason	Beeban Kidron	StudioCanal; Working Title Films; Miramax Films; Universal Pictures	—N/a
2005	Kingdom of Heaven	Ridley Scott	Studio Babelsberg; Scott Free Productions; 20th Century Fox	As composer and conductor Replaced Hans Zimmer
2005	Domino	Tony Scott	Scott Free Productions; Davis Films; New Line Cinema	—N/a
2005	The Chronicles of Narnia: The Lion, the Witch and the Wardrobe	Andrew Adamson	Walden Media; Walt Disney Pictures	As composer and conductor
2006	The Uninvited	Louise Runge	Logo TV	Short film
2006	Seraphim Falls	David Von Ancken	Icon Productions; Samuel Goldwyn Films; Destination Films	—N/a
2006	Flushed Away	David Bowers; Sam Fell	Aardman Animations; DreamWorks Animation; Paramount Pictures	As composer and conductor
2006	Déjà Vu	Tony Scott	Jerry Bruckheimer Films; Scott Free Productions; Touchstone Pictures	—N/a
2007	The Number 23	Joel Schumacher	New Line Cinema	—N/a
2007	Shrek the Third	Chris Miller; Raman Hui	PDI/DreamWorks; DreamWorks Animation; Paramount Pictures	As composer and conductor
2007	Gone Baby Gone	Ben Affleck	The Ladd Company; Miramax Films	—N/a
2007	Slipstream	Anthony Hopkins	Strand Releasing; Destination Films	Music producer Score composed by Anthony Hopkins
2008	Em	Tony Barbieri	SnagFilms; Vanguard Cinema	—N/a
2008	The Forbidden Kingdom	Rob Minkoff	Lionsgate; Relativity Media; Casey Silver Productions; Huayi Brothers	Score producer Score composed by David Buckley
2008	The Chronicles of Narnia: Prince Caspian	Andrew Adamson	Walden Media; Walt Disney Pictures	As composer and conductor Also voiced Patterwig the Squirrel
2008	Jolene	Dan Ireland	E1 Entertainment	Also music producer
2009	X-Men Origins: Wolverine	Gavin Hood	Seed Productions; Marvel Entertainment; 20th Century Fox	As composer and conductor Additional music by Hybrid and Halli Cauthery
2009	The Taking of Pelham 123	Tony Scott	Escape Artists; Scott Free Productions; Relativity Media; Metro-Goldwyn-Mayer; Columbia Pictures	Additional music by Hybrid

==== 2010s ====
Year	Title	Director(s)	Studio(s)	Notes
2010	Twelve	Joel Schumacher	Radar Pictures; Hannover House; Gaumont	—N/a
2010	Shrek Forever After	Mike Mitchell	DreamWorks Animation; Paramount Pictures	As composer and conductor
2010	Prince of Persia: The Sands of Time	Mike Newell	Jerry Bruckheimer Films; Walt Disney Pictures	Additional music by Halli Cauthery and David Buckley; As composer and conductor
2010	The Town	Ben Affleck	GK Films; Legendary Pictures; Warner Bros. Pictures	Co-composed with David Buckley
2010	Unstoppable	Tony Scott	Scott Free Productions; Dune Entertainment; 20th Century Fox	Additional music by Justin Caine Burnett
2011	Life in a Day	Kevin Macdonald	National Geographic Films	—N/a
2011	Cowboys & Aliens	Jon Favreau	Platinum Studios; Fairview Entertainment; Imagine Entertainment; DreamWorks Pictures; Universal Pictures (North America); Paramount Pictures (International)	Additional music by Halli Cauthery; Hybrid provided sound design textures
2011	Arthur Christmas	Sarah Smith	Aardman Animations; Sony Pictures Animation; Columbia Pictures	Also music producer and conductor Replaced Michael Giacchino and Adam Cohen
2012	Prometheus	Ridley Scott	Scott Free Productions; Brandywine Productions; Dune Entertainment; 20th Century Fox	Two tracks ("Life" and "We Were Right"); Main score by Marc Streitenfeld
2012	I Am Bad	David Rackoff	OneZero Productions	—N/a
2012	Total Recall	Len Wiseman	Original Film; Columbia Pictures	Additional music by Hybrid; As composer and music producer Orchestra conducted by Gavin Greenaway
2013	The East	Zal Batmanglij	Scott Free Productions; Fox Searchlight Pictures	Themes; Main score by Halli Cauthery
2013	Mr. Pip	Andrew Adamson	Olympus Pictures	—N/a
2014	Hate from a Distance	Dan Ireland	Privarte Pictures	Co-composed with Tom Howe
2014	The Equalizer	Antoine Fuqua	Escape Artists; Village Roadshow Pictures; Columbia Pictures	Additional music by Hybrid
2015	Blackhat	Michael Mann	Legendary Pictures; Universal Pictures	Co-composed with Atticus Ross, Ryan Amon, and Leo Ross
2015	Monkey Kingdom	Mark Linfield; Alastair Fothergill	Disneynature	—N/a
2015	The Martian	Ridley Scott	Genre Films; Scott Free Productions; 20th Century Fox	As composer and conductor
2015	Miss You Already	Catherine Hardwicke	Lionsgate (US); Entertainment One (UK)	—N/a
2016	Confirmation	Rick Famuyiwa	HBO	TV movie Additional music by Stephanie Economou
2016	Live by Night	Ben Affleck	Warner Bros. Pictures; Appian Way Productions; Pearl Street Films	Additional music by Stephanie Economou; As composer and conductor
2017	The Zookeeper's Wife	Niki Caro	Focus Features	Additional music by Stephanie Economou; As composer and conductor
2017	Breath	Simon Baker	See Pictures; Windalong; Gran Via; FilmRise	Additional music by Stephanie Economou
2017	Alien: Covenant	Ridley Scott	Scott Free Productions; Brandywine Productions; 20th Century Fox	Two tracks ("Life" and "We Were Right"); Main score by Jed Kurzel
2018	Early Man	Nick Park	StudioCanal; Aardman Animations	Co-composed with Tom Howe; Additional music by Paul Mounsey; Orchestra conducted with Gavin Greenaway
2018	The Equalizer 2	Antoine Fuqua	Columbia Pictures; Escape Artists	Additional music by Stephanie Economou
2018	The Meg	Jon Turteltaub	Warner Bros. Pictures	Additional music by Stephanie Economou; As composer and conductor
2019	Penguins	Alastair Fothergill; Jeff Wilson	Disneynature	—N/a

==== 2020s ====
Year	Title	Director(s)	Studio(s)	Notes
2020	Mulan	Niki Caro	Walt Disney Pictures	Themes by Jerry Goldsmith; Additional music by Stephanie Economou and Tom Howe
2021	Infinite	Antoine Fuqua	Paramount+	—N/a
2021	The Last Duel	Ridley Scott	20th Century Studios; Scott Free Productions	—N/a
2021	House of Gucci	Ridley Scott	Metro-Goldwyn-Mayer; Bron Creative; United Artists Releasing; Scott Free Productions	—N/a
2021	Al Kameen	Pierre Morel	AGC Studios; Image Nation Abu Dhabi	—N/a
2022	Return to Space	Jimmy Chin; Elizabeth Chai Vasarhelyi	Netflix	Co-composed with Mychael Danna
2022	Polar Bear	Alastair Fothergill; Jeff Wilson	Disneynature	—N/a
2023	Meg 2: The Trench	Ben Wheatley	Warner Bros. Pictures	—N/a
2023	Retribution	Nimród Antal	Lionsgate; Roadside Attractions	—N/a
2023	Chicken Run: Dawn of the Nugget	Sam Fell	Netflix; Aardman Animations	—N/a
2024	Gladiator II	Ridley Scott	Paramount Pictures; Scott Free Productions; Red Wagon Entertainment	—N/a
2025	Normal	Ben Wheatley	Magnolia Pictures	Composed with Ryder McNair
2026	The Dog Stars	Ridley Scott	20th Century Studios; Scott Free Productions	—N/a
2026	Animals	Ben Affleck	Netflix; Artists Equity; Makeready; Fifth Season	—N/a

=== Television ===
Year	Title	Notes
1991	G.B.H.	2 episodes music coordinator
1992	Champion Children	
1999	The Hunger	Episode: "Sanctuary"
2002	AFP: American Fighter Pilot	
2004	Father of the Pride	3 episodes
2007–2008	The Riches	
2007	Shrek the Halls	TV special
2017–2018	Philip K. Dick's Electric Dreams	
2019	Whiskey Cavalier	Composed with Tom Howe
2019	Catch-22	Composed with Rupert Gregson-Williams
2020	Manhunt	Composed season 2 with Stephanie Economou
2020	Amazing Stories	Episode: "Signs of Life"
2022–2025	The Gilded Age	Composed with Rupert Gregson-Williams
2025	Underdogs	Composed with Ho-Ling Tang and Ryder McNair

=== Video games ===
Year	Title	Notes
2001	Metal Gear Solid 2: Sons of Liberty	With Norihiko Hibino
2004	Metal Gear Solid 3: Snake Eater	With Norihiko Hibino
2007	Call of Duty 4: Modern Warfare	Main theme only and music producer With Stephen Barton
2008	Metal Gear Solid 4: Guns of the Patriots	With Nobuko Toda, Shuichi Kobori, and Kazuma Jinnouchi
2014	Metal Gear Solid V: Ground Zeroes	With Ludvig Forssell
2014	Call of Duty: Advanced Warfare	Main title and themes only With Audiomachine (Paul Dinletir and Kevin Rix)
2015	Metal Gear Solid V: The Phantom Pain	Music producer Score composed by Ludvig Forssell, Justin Burnett and Daniel James

=== Rides ===
Year	Title	Notes
2001	Shrek 4-D	At various theme parks around the world. Based on the Shrek film franchise.

== Awards and nominations ==
Year	Organization	Category	Work	Result	Ref.
2001	Annie Awards	Outstanding Achievement for Music in a Feature Production	Shrek (Note: Shared with John Powell)	Won	
2001	Saturn Awards	Saturn Award for Best Music	Shrek	Nominated	
2001	British Academy of Film and Television Arts	Best Original Music	Shrek	Nominated	
2009	BAFTA Game Awards	British Academy Games Award for Music	Metal Gear Solid 4: Guns of the Patriots	Nominated	
2018	Primetime Emmy Awards	Outstanding Music Composition for a Limited Series, Movie or Special (Original Dramatic Score)	Electric Dreams: The Commute	Nominated	
2022	Primetime Emmy Awards	Outstanding Music Composition for a Documentary Series or Special	Return to Space	Nominated	
2024	Hollywood Music in Media Awards	Hollywood Music in Media Award for Best Original Score in a Feature Film	Gladiator II	Nominated	
