= The Crimson Wing =

The Crimson Wing may refer to:

- The Crimson Wing: Mystery of the Flamingos, a 2008 nature documentary
- The Crimson Wing (1915 film), a silent film directed by E. H. Calvert
