= Chimpanzee (film) =

2012 nature documentary film

- Theatrical release poster
- Directed by: Alastair Fothergill; Mark Linfield
- Written by: Alastair Fothergill; Mark Linfield; Don Hahn
- Produced by: Alastair Fothergill; Mark Linfield; Alix Tidmarsh
- Narrated by: Tim Allen
- Cinematography: Martyn Colbeck (Ivory Coast); Bill Wallauer (Uganda)
- Edited by: Andy Netley
- Music by: Nicholas Hooper
- Production companies: Disneynature; Great Ape Productions
- Distributed by: Walt Disney Studios Motion Pictures
- Release dates: April 20, 2012 (United States); February 20, 2013 (France); May 3, 2013 (United Kingdom)
- Running time: 78 minutes
- Countries: United States; France; United Kingdom
- Languages: English; French
- Budget: $5 million
- Box office: $34.8 million

Chimpanzee is a 2012 nature documentary film about a young common chimpanzee named Oscar who finds himself alone in the African forests until he is adopted by another chimpanzee, who takes him in and treats him like his own child. The American release of the film is narrated by Tim Allen.

The film was produced by Disneynature and directed by Alastair Fothergill and Mark Linfield. It is the sixth nature documentary released under the Disneynature label, following Earth, The Crimson Wing: Mystery of the Flamingos, Oceans, Wings of Life, and African Cats. It was released in theaters on April 20, 2012, just before Earth Day, April 22.

== Plot ==
In Taï National Park in Ivory Coast, Oscar is a young chimpanzee in his toddler years and is part of a close-knit tribe of chimpanzees who occupy a forest territory which is rich in native fruits, nuts, and figs. The chimpanzees hunt small tree monkeys, and they also eat termites collected with primitive tools made from sticks. They also use rocks as tools to crack nuts. Oscar is tended by his mother, Isha, and from her he begins learning many things about how to survive in the jungle. In the chaos of an attack by a rival gang of chimpanzees led by Scar, Isha is injured and separated from the group and her son. As told by the narrator, Isha most probably falls victim to a nocturnal leopard.

Unaware of his mother's death, Oscar spends much of his time looking for her. He has trouble recalling the things she taught him and loses weight quickly. He attempts to find another mother to take care of him. However, none of the females in the group can afford to help him, already having young of their own to raise. As time goes on, Oscar is rejected by all the chimpanzees in the group, until the only one left to approach is the tough-skinned alpha male, Freddy. As Oscar follows Freddy and imitates him, it is soon revealed that this unlikely pairing may work out. The two gradually warm up to each other more and more, until one day Freddy lets Oscar ride on his back, something normally only mother chimpanzees do.

As the rivals prepare for attack, Freddy is forced to take time away from Oscar to organize the other members of the group, and this leaves the young chimpanzee confused. Scar leads a vicious attack, but because of the unity of Freddy's group, they are driven away into the jungle. A few months later, it is revealed that the bond between Freddy and Oscar has continued to grow, and that life in the group is slowly returning to normal.

== Production ==
The film took over four years to create, due to the difficulties of filming in Taï National Park during the wet season and capturing usable footage of common chimpanzees, a species that is known to act reclusive to human activity.

Allegedly "Oscar" was portrayed by several chimpanzees in the film.

Although studies suggest that chimpanzees are capable of committing acts of altruism, Oscar's adoption is the first instance of such an action by the species to be documented on film.

=== Music ===
The McClain Sisters wrote and performed the song "Rise" to be featured as the end credits song for Chimpanzee. The song was released on iTunes on March 23, 2012 and peaked at #4 on Billboard's Kid Digital Songs charts. Its release was in support of Disney's Friends for Change.

== Release ==
Chimpanzee had its world premiere at Walt Disney World's Downtown Disney in Lake Buena Vista, Florida. Among the attendees were directors Alastair Fothergill and Mark Linfield, producer Don Hahn, and primatologist Jane Goodall.

Similar to past Disneynature releases, a portion of the film's opening week proceeds were donated to the Jane Goodall Institute for the "See Chimpanzee, Save Chimpanzees" program to help protect chimpanzees and their habitats. Disney donated $0.20 of every ticket sold, with $100,000 being the bare minimum. After the film's successful debut, Disney extended the campaign into the second weekend.

The film was released in the UK on 3 May 2013.

== Reception ==
=== Box office ===
Chimpanzee earned $10.7 million in its opening weekend.

=== Critical response ===
On the review aggregator Rotten Tomatoes, the film holds an approval rating of 74% based on 97 critics, with an average score of 6.5/10. The website's consensus reads: "Chimpanzee often anthropomorphizes its subjects, but it's a beautifully filmed, remarkably intimate look at the lives of a family of primates". Metacritic, which uses a weighted average, assigned the film a score of 57 out of 100, based on 23 critics, indicating "mixed or average" reviews. CinemaScore audiences gave the film a grade "A" rating on an A+ to F scale.

=== Accolades ===
The film received a nomination for Best Live Action Family Film at the 2012 Phoenix Film Critics Society Awards.
