= OceanWorld 3D =

- French theatrical release poster
- Directed by: Jean-Jacques Mantello
- Written by: Francois Mantello; Jean-Jacques Mantello
- Narrated by: Marion Cotillard
- Production companies: 3D Entertainment; Wild Bunch
- Distributed by: Wild Bunch (France); Disneynature (United States, through Walt Disney Studios Motion Pictures)
- Release date: 2009
- Running time: 81 minutes
- Countries: France; United States; United Kingdom
- Languages: English; French

OceanWorld 3D is a 2009 3D documentary directed by Jean-Jacques Mantello and narrated by Marion Cotillard. The film is about the variety of animal life in the ocean. It features Californian kelp forests, the Great Barrier Reef in Australia, and the Roca Partida island off the coast of Mexico, which is home to thousands of sharks as well as other marine animals. Among the featured species are the manta ray, the hammerhead shark, the lionfish, the Spanish dancer, the dolphin, and a few of the largest cetaceans on the planet.

== Reception ==
CineMagazine rated the film 3.5 stars.
