= Sea Rex =

Sea Rex 3D: Journey to a Prehistoric World
- Directed by: Ronan Chapalain; Pascal Vuong
- Produced by: Francois Mantello; Franck Savorgnan; Catherine Vuong; Pascal Vuong
- Starring: Guillaume Denaiffe; Norbert Ferrer; Chloe Hollings; Richard Rider; Tom Yang
- Music by: Franck Marchal
- Distributed by: 3D Entertainment; National Geographic
- Release date: May 14, 2010
- Countries: United Kingdom; France
- Language: English

Sea Rex 3D: Journey to a Prehistoric World, also known simply as Sea Rex, is a 2010 3D film directed by Ronan Chapalain and which was released to IMAX theaters in 2010. It was released on Blu-ray and Blu-ray 3D in November 2010.

== Human characters ==
- Julie: An American teenage blonde girl who discovers the wonders of prehistory.
- Georges Cuvier: A comparative anatomist who shows Julie the history of the marine reptiles.

== Prehistoric Animals ==
- Quetzalcoatlus
- Parasaurolophus
- Elasmosaurus
- Liopleurodon
- Tanystropheus
- Placochelys
- Rhomaleosaurus
- Ammonites
- Leedsichthys
- Mosasaurus
- Ichthyornis
- Cryptoclidus
- Nothosaurus
- Shonisaurus
- Ophthalmosaurus
- Mixosaurus
- Prognathodon
- Cretoxyrhina
- Otodus
- Rhamphorhynchus
- Megalosaurus
- Brachiosaurus
- Dakosaurus
- Stegosaurus
- Kronosaurus
