= 3D Entertainment =

3D film distributor and studio

3D Entertainment Film Holdings
- Type: Subsidiary
- Industry: Motion picture
- Founded: 2001; 25 years ago in London, United Kingdom
- Headquarters: Weybridge, Surrey, United Kingdom; London, United Kingdom; Los Angeles, California, United States; Paris, France
- Area served: Worldwide
- Key people: Francois Mantello (CEO & Chairman); Jean-Jacques Mantello (Film director)
- Products: 3D films
- Parent: IMAX Corporation
- Website: www.3defilms.com

3D Entertainment Film Holdings is a producer and distributor of 3D films for IMAX and digital 3D theatrical exhibition through its divisions 3D Entertainment Films, which produces films, and 3D Entertainment Distribution, which handles theatrical sales and marketing.

The company has offices in London, Los Angeles, and Paris. The studio hasn't produced much since 2015.

== Films ==
Title	Release date	Notes
Ocean Wonderland	2003	
Sharks 3D	2005	
Ocean Wonderland	2005	
Dolphins and Whales 3D: The Tribes of the Ocean	2009	
OceanWorld 3D	2009	Acquired in 2009 by Walt Disney Studios Motion Pictures.
Time: The 4th Dimension	2012	
Sea Rex 3D: Journey to a Prehistoric World	2014	
Air Racers 3D	2014	
Kenya 3D: Animal Kingdom	2015	
D-Day: Normandy 1944	2015	
Jean-Michel Cousteau's Secret Ocean	2015	
Wonders of the Sea	2017	
