= Penguins (film) =

- Theatrical release poster
- Directed by: Alastair Fothergill; Jeff Wilson
- Written by: David Fowler
- Produced by: Alastair Fothergill; Keith Scholey; Roy Conli; Jeff Wilson
- Narrated by: Ed Helms
- Cinematography: Tom Beldam; Sophie Darlington; Rolf Steinmann
- Edited by: Andy Netley
- Music by: Harry Gregson-Williams
- Production companies: Disneynature; Silverback Films
- Distributed by: Walt Disney Studios Motion Pictures
- Release date: April 17, 2019 (United States)
- Running time: 76 minutes
- Country: United States
- Language: English
- Box office: $7.7 million

Penguins is a 2019 American nature documentary film directed by Alastair Fothergill and Jeff Wilson. The coming-of-age story follows an Adélie penguin named Steve, who joins fellow males in the icy Antarctic spring on a quest to build a suitable nest, find a life partner and start a family. The American release of the film is narrated by Ed Helms.

Produced by Disneynature, the film was released in the United States on April 17, 2019, five days before Earth Day and four years to the day of the release of fellow Disneynature production Monkey Kingdom. It is the thirteenth nature documentary to be released under the Disneynature label. The film received positive reviews from critics, who singled out the "beautiful cinematography".

== Plot ==
In Antarctica, Steve, an Adelie Penguin, is preparing to start a family. He tries all day to impress a mate, but fails. As he is ready to give up, he meets Adeline, a female who has not yet found a mate. Together, they start to love each other.

Sometime later, Adeline has two eggs. Steve goes off with the other males to look for fish, while Adeline huddles in her eggs in a rock nest. Later, as the other males head back to the colony, Steve, who did not realize he was the only one left, is still looking for fish. He is chased out by a killer whale, and luckily he escapes. As he makes his way back, a blizzard covers the colony, including Adeline and the eggs, but they, along with Steve, who was still in the cold, survive, and Steve and Adeline reunite. As time passes, the eggs hatch into chicks, and Steve is excited by his new children. As the chicks grow, they are threatened by skuas, who are out searching for food to feed their chicks, Steve comes to the rescue, and the skuas retreat.

As the months go by, the chicks grow into young adults, and as summer ends, the penguins return to the waters for the rest of the year. During the trip across the new ice pack, the family is soon hunted by a Leopard Seal. One of the chicks plays a trick on the predator by playing dead. The seal departs and the family reach the ocean and go their separate ways. The chicks start a new life with the others, Adeline bids farewell to Steve till the next year, and Steve takes a walk in the Antarctic beach, congratulating himself for his first year of being a father.

A year later, Steve and Adeline reunite on a rocky hill, before waddling down to the nesting grounds to start their new family.

== Release ==
The film was released in the United States on April 17, 2019.

== Reception ==
=== Box office ===
In the United States and Canada, Penguins was released alongside Disney’s own Breakthrough, and was projected to gross $5–7 million from 1,800 theaters in its five-day opening weekend. The film made $503,000 on its first day and $456,000 on its second. The film ended up underperforming, grossing just $2.3 million in its opening weekend (and a total $3.3 million over the five days), finishing outside the top 10. In its second weekend the film fell 50% to $1.1 million, finishing 10th.

=== Critical response ===
On review aggregator Rotten Tomatoes, the film holds an approval rating of 92% based on 66 reviews, with an average rating of 7.1/10. The website's critical consensus reads: "Disneynature: Penguins plays up its subjects' adorable appeal with a beautifully filmed documentary that adds plenty of anthropomorphic entertainment value for young viewers". On Metacritic, the film has a weighted average score of 69 out of 100, based on 18 critics, indicating "generally favorable reviews". Audiences polled by CinemaScore gave the film an average grade of "A" on an A+ to F scale, while those at PostTrak gave it an overall positive score of 78% and a "definite recommend" of 52%.

Variety's Courtney Howard called Penguins a "sweet, sentimental Earth Day documentary" and wrote: "Instead of bombarding the audience with factoids and heavy scientific terminology, it lets a poignant narrative unspool — one with an engaging, highly accessible and hugely entertaining underdog hero's journey".

=== Accolades ===
Year	Award	Category	Nominee(s)	Result	Ref.
2019	Critics' Choice Documentary Awards	Best Science/Nature Documentary	Penguins	Nominated	
2020	Wildscreen Panda Awards	Best Editing	Andy Netley	Won	
