= Monkey Kingdom =

2015 American nature documentary film

- Theatrical release poster
- Directed by: Mark Linfield; Alastair Fothergill
- Produced by: Mark Linfield; Alastair Fothergill
- Narrated by: Tina Fey
- Cinematography: Martyn Colbeck; Gavin Thurston
- Edited by: Andy Netley
- Music by: Harry Gregson-Williams
- Production companies: Disneynature; Silverback Films; Crazy Ape Productions
- Distributed by: Walt Disney Studios Motion Pictures
- Release date: April 17, 2015 (United States)
- Running time: 81 minutes
- Country: United States
- Language: English
- Budget: $5–10 million
- Box office: $17.1 million

Monkey Kingdom is a 2015 American nature documentary film directed and produced by Mark Linfield and Alastair Fothergill and narrated by Tina Fey. The documentary is about a family of monkeys living in ancient ruins founded in the jungles of Polonnaruwa in Sri Lanka. The film was released by Disneynature on April 17, 2015, the eighth nature documentary released under that label.

== Plot ==
In the ruins of an ancient city in the jungles of Polonnaruwa in Sri Lanka, Maya is a toque macaque who was born at the bottom of the social order tree in her family. Even though she is a lowborn, the troop's alpha male, Raja, keeps a close eye on her, and considers Maya to be his property. One day, during the courtship season, a handsome male monkey named Kumar arrives & catches Maya's gaze from just outside of the troupe's territory. As Maya is in estrus, she and Kumar discreetly mate, but are caught by Raja, who knows that he has been duped. Kumar is chased away by Raja and his sub-alpha male guards.

6 months later, Maya gives birth to Kumar's son, Kip. With Kumar gone, Maya is left to raise, feed and care for their new son alone. As monsoon season arrives, Maya takes advantage of the feast that it brings. Later, during a time of food scarcity after the monsoon season ends, Maya takes Kip and leads the other Lowborn to a lily pond, where they forage and even dive to procure the nutritious seed pods of the lotus lily, knowing that the Highborn would not even recognize the lotus lily pond as a possible food source. As Maya and her fellow Lowborn submerge and emerge with seed pods, they are unknowingly being stalked by a monitor lizard. Maya, Kip and the Lowborn watch in horror as one of their own is captured and eaten by the monitor lizard.

The next day, Maya, with Kip clinging to her, then finds a caterpillar patch and begins gorging on the highly nutritious caterpillars. When the queens of the family, known as the Sisterhood, discover that Maya has not given them priority over this high protein, high value food source, Maya is beaten mercilessly by the trio, who then kidnap her son, Kip, and take him far from Maya. After some time, the Sisterhood lose interest in Kip and abandon him, leaving him alone in the woods. Maya searches for hours for her lost child, frequently calling out to him vocally, until finally, the two are reunited.

The next day, Maya leads the Lowborn far from their home into a neighboring city, where they find copious food. They raid a home full of food intended for a birthday party that's to occur later that afternoon. With the humans away and oblivious to the macaque's break-in, Maya and her cohorts gorge on birthday cake, bread, fruit and all other manner of food. During the actual raid, Kip remains safe with another lowborn, just outside of the home that his mother has raided. The lowborn return to the troop's home in the forest, a granite outcrop called Castle Rock, and they fall asleep with full stomachs.

As the sun rises the next day, Maya awakens to see Kip's father, Kumar, lurking just outside of the troupe's territory boundary. Having met with such a hasty exit with his last visit, Kumar is much wiser and more careful this time. He pays his dues, so to speak, gently and gradually introducing himself into the troop. He first befriends the young macaques, playing and wrestling with them. He next befriends Raja's body guards, and puts in lots of time grooming and building social bonds. Kumar is showing sure signs of being a natural born leader. His acceptance into the troupe is made certain when, during jackfruit season, Raja shares jackfruit with Kumar. Kumar is given an opportunity to further ingratiate himself with the troupe and prove his loyalty to Raja when a rival troop, led by Lex, comes to invade Castle Rock and take it as their own territory. Despite putting up a good fight, Raja, Kumar, the Sisterhood, Maya, Kip and the entire troupe lose the battle and retreat.

Now homeless and in very unfamiliar circumstances, Maya leads the homeless troop back to the city, where abundant food, shelter and opportunity await. The troop spends time in the city, rebuilding their strength, filling their bellies, and sleeping high on utility poles, but they never lose their desire to reclaim Castle Rock. After they've regathered their strength, the troupe begins the long journey back through the forest toward Castle Rock. On this trip, Maya leads again, with Kumar right by her side and Kip close-by. The Sisterhood and the former Alpha, Raja, bring up the rear, having been dealt a healthy dose of humility during the last many days. As the troop approaches Castle Rock, Kumar leads the attack, supported by Raja and crew. The troupe manages to take back their home, chasing Lex and the invaders far into the forest.

A year later, Maya sits high in the social order tree, along with Kumar, who's now the Alpha of the troop, while Raja assumes his place as one of Kumar's militia. He still attends to the Sisterhood, but he seems to have lost their support. With Kip clinging to her chest and Kumar by her side, Maya has managed to change her ranking in a hierarchy that had once predestined her to live at the bottom of the social order tree, surviving only on the scraps of those higher up the social order tree. In doing so, she's secured a better future for herself, Kip, and her newborn baby daughter.

== Cast ==
Monkey Kingdom's major toque macaque characters consist of lead female Maya, her newborn son Kip, the troupe's alpha male Raja, a trio of high status females called The Sisterhood, Grandpa, an elderly but once-fierce male, and Kumar, a newcomer wishing entrance to the monkey tribe.

The film is narrated by Tina Fey.

== Production ==
Monkey Kingdom is the eighth film by Disneynature, the independent film label of Walt Disney Studios. The film is directed and produced by Mark Linfield and Alastair Fothergill, who previously co-directed Disneynature's first release, Earth (2007), as well as Chimpanzee (2012). Fothergill also co-directed African Cats (2011) and Bears (2014). Dr. Wolfgang Dittus was the scientific consultant and has been studying the macaque monkeys of Sri Lanka for nearly 50 years. His and Jane Goodall's study at Gombe are the longest running studies of wild primates. For the film, Dittus helped select the monkey characters and decipher their behavior. The film was scored by British composer Harry Gregson-Williams, and was shot using Sony F65 cameras.

== Release ==
Monkey Kingdom was released on April 17, 2015. and internationally on April 23 to coincide with Earth Day. A portion of box office receipts was donated to Conservation International. The first official trailer for the film was released on April 18, 2014, featuring the song "Team" by Lorde and attached theatrically with Bears.

=== Home media ===
Monkey Kingdom was released on Blu-ray + DVD + Digital HD combo pack on September 15, 2015.

== Reception ==
=== Box office ===
In North America, it opened simultaneously with Paul Blart: Mall Cop 2 and Unfriended on April 17, 2015, across 2,012 theaters, which is the widest release for a Disneynature film, earning $1.5 million. Through its opening weekend it earned $4.58 million, coming at eighth place at the box office, which is the lowest debut for a Disneynature film behind 2014's Bears ($4.78 million).

The film begun its international rollout on April 17 in Ecuador, the same day as the US release, debuting in 6th place, earning $17,573 from 18 screens. The film dropped in its second week to 10th place, dropping -35% and earning $11,382. In its third week, the movie rose to fifth place but dropped -77% to finish with $2,644 from 13 screens. As of June 2015, the film grossed $16,272,000.

=== Critical reception ===
Monkey Kingdom received positive reviews from critics. On Rotten Tomatoes, the film has a rating of 93%, based on 55 reviews, with an average rating of 7.28/10. The site's consensus reads: "Monkey Kingdom's breathtaking footage of primates in the wild is likely to please animal lovers of all ages". On Metacritic, the film has a score of 72 out of 100, based on 21 critics, indicating "generally favorable reviews". CinemaScore polls conducted during the opening weekend, cinema audiences gave Monkey Kingdom an average grade of "A−" on an A+ to F scale.

=== Accolades ===
Year	Award	Category	Recipient(s)	Result	Ref.
2015	Environmental Media Awards	Feature Film	Monkey Kingdom	Nominated	
2015	Golden Trailer Awards	Best Documentary TV Spot	Disneynature, Toy Box Entertainment	Won	
