= Ghost of the Mountains =

2017 nature documentary film

- Disney Movies Anywhere poster
- Directed by: Ben Wallis
- Written by: Ben Wallis
- Produced by: Brian Leith
- Narrated by: Antoine Fuqua
- Music by: Barnaby Taylor
- Production companies: Disneynature; Brian Leith Productions
- Distributed by: Walt Disney Studios Motion Pictures
- Release date: June 30, 2017 (United States)
- Running time: 78 minutes
- Country: United States
- Language: English

Ghost of the Mountains is a 2017 American nature documentary film about snow leopards on the Tibetan Plateau. Directed and written by Ben Wallis and narrated by Antoine Fuqua, Ghost of the Mountains was released theatrically by Disneynature on June 30, 2017, the eleventh nature documentary released under that label.

Much of the work depended on local Tibetans, their vast knowledge of the environment, and their sincere hospitality. It was filmed in Yulshul, Kham.
