= Disneynature =

Independent film studio

- Type: Division
- Industry: Film
- Genre: Nature films
- Founded: April 21, 2008; 18 years ago
- Founder: Jean-François Camilleri
- Headquarters: Paris, France (production office); Walt Disney Studios, Burbank, California, United States (head office)
- Area served: Worldwide
- Key people: Paul Baribault (VP & GM)
- Products: Motion pictures
- Owner: The Walt Disney Studios
- Parent: Walt Disney Pictures
- Website: nature.disney.com

Disneynature is a French-American film production company that specializes in the production of nature documentary films for Walt Disney Studios, a division of Disney Entertainment, which is owned by The Walt Disney Company. Disneynature was founded on April 21, 2008, and is headquartered in Burbank, California and Paris, France.

The company's nature films are consistently budgeted between $5 million to $10 million, with their distribution and marketing handled by Walt Disney Studios Motion Pictures. The label's event films are released on Earth Day and have a conservation campaign based on the feature of the film with an appropriate conservation charity receiving donations based on tickets sold, at a pace of one per year. The eight Disneynature theatrical films have a gross of $328.3 million at the worldwide box office, from a combined total budget of $162 million, with Earth the top earner at $109 million.

== Background ==
Disney had a background in making nature films prior to the creation of Disneynature; Bambi (1942) featured forest life and was a hit. From 1948 through 1960, the company produced the True-Life Adventures series, which won several Academy Awards and was involved in the release of Hugo van Lawick's Serengeti Symphony in the Netherlands in 1998. Outside of film work, Disney parks were involved. Disneyland in 1955 opened the Jungle Cruise ride. Walt Disney World includes Disney's Animal Kingdom, which is a theme park crossed with a zoo. Animal Kingdom has contributed to conservation causes by nursing endangered sea turtles back to health, returning white rhinos to Africa and conducting a census of cotton-top tamarins, a monkey species native to Colombia. In addition, since its creation in 1995, the Disney Wildlife Conservation Fund has given over $11 million to 650 conservation projects in 110 countries.

After a long absence from nature documentaries, Disney decided to get back into the market after the French release of March of the Penguins. The film was given U.S. distribution through Warner Independent Pictures in 2005. Made on an $8 million budget, it grossed almost 10 times its budget at the U.S. box office and won the Academy Award for Best Documentary Feature in 2006. Jean-Francois Camilleri, head of Buena Vista International France at the time, had the company acquire the film for the French market. Buena Vista International France also managed to obtain a 20% ownership stake in the French version of the film, but Buena Vista Pictures Distribution's bid to distribute the film in the U.S. ultimately failed. Disney CEO Bob Iger, in consideration of Disney's past efforts, felt that Penguins "should have been a Disney film worldwide". This was the impetus behind the creation of Disneynature. The film's 2007 follow-up was Arctic Tale, which only took in $1.8 million worldwide. Paul Baribault, Vice President of Disney Studios Marketing, led the US efforts for Disneynature from 2008 forward, overseeing all marketing, production, brand development, and conservation programmatic efforts for the label. He was eventually named general manager of Disneynature.

== History ==
Disneynature was announced on April 21, 2008, a day before Earth Day, with a starting slate of seven films. Camilleri was set to head the new division. A multi-film production agreement was made with Alastair Fothergill, BBC's Planet Earth series producer, for three scheduled films: Earth (2009), African Cats (2011) and Chimpanzee (2012). The other announced slate films and their release years were: The Crimson Wing: Mystery of the Flamingos (2008), Oceans (2010), Orangutans: One Minute to Midnight (2010) and Wings of Life (2011). Original announced plans had the division releasing two films per year, which was curtailed by April 2009 due to a nature film's long period needed to film wildlife. No decision was made at that time as to whether the studio would donate the films' proceeds to conservation causes.

The Crimson Wing: Mystery of the Flamingos was the first film produced for Disneynature. The first film released domestically under the new label was Earth, opening on April 22, 2009, in the US. In 2012, a Disneynature TV cable channel was launched in France. It is currently carried by France Telecom.

Animal Planet picked up for a two-year period three Disneynature films, Oceans, African Cats, and The Crimson Wing: Mystery of the Flamingos, in April 2012 from Disney–ABC Domestic Television. In April 2014, Jane Goodall was named Disneynature ambassador.

Disneynature recently expanded to China with the production of Born in China. The production was made possible due to an expansion of Disney's relationship with Shanghai Media Group starting in 2014. Following Born in China, Ghost of the Mountains and Expedition China were released to Netflix to reflect the incredible journeys involved in creating these films. In 2016, the company released its first compilation film, Growing Up Wild, direct-to-video (Blu-ray and DVD) and video on demand.

Paul Baribault, vice president of studio marketing and Disneynature, was appointed general manager of Disneynature officially in 2018, after having been operating in the capacity for several years. Camilleri resigned his posts with Disney in March 2019. Helene Etzi was appointed to take over his responsibility as head of Disney's French operations. The unit's first streaming films for Disney+ were Dolphin Reef and Elephant.

== Filmography ==
Film	Release date	Behind-the-scenes documentary	Market	Narrator	Budget (millions)	Worldwide gross (millions)	Production company
The Crimson Wing: Mystery of the Flamingos	October 26, 2008 (France); October 27, 2010 (United States)	N/A	Worldwide	Mariella Frostrup			Natural Light Films; Kudos Pictures
Earth	April 22, 2009	N/A	North America, South America and Italy	Patrick Stewart (UK); James Earl Jones (US)	$47	$109	BBC Worldwide; Greenlight Media; Discovery Channel; BBC Natural History Unit
OceanWorld	2009 Cannes Film Festival, Marché du Film	N/A	North America	Marion Cotillard			3D Entertainment
Oceans	April 22, 2010	N/A	North America	Jacques Perrin (FR); Pierce Brosnan (US)	$80.0	$82.7	Pathé; Galatée Films; Participant Media; Notro Films; France 3 Cinéma; France 2 Cinéma; JMH-TSR
Wings of Life	April 16, 2011	N/A	Worldwide	Meryl Streep			Blacklight Films
African Cats	April 22, 2011	N/A	Worldwide	Patrick Stewart (UK); Samuel L. Jackson (US)	$5	$30.9	Big Cats Productions
Chimpanzee	April 20, 2012	N/A	Worldwide	Tim Allen	$5	$34.8	Great Ape Productions
Bears	April 18, 2014	N/A	North America	John C. Reilly	$5	$21.3	Bearsar Productions
Monkey Kingdom	April 17, 2015	N/A	North America	Tina Fey	$5–10	$17.1	Crazy Ape Productions
Growing Up Wild (Note: Growing Up Wild is a direct-to-video nature documentary film released on December 6, 2016, directed by Mark Linfield and Keith Scholey, with narration provided by Daveed Diggs. The film, which is based on clips from African Cats, Monkey Kingdom, Chimpanzee, and Bears, focuses on "growing up".)	December 6, 2016	N/A	North America	Daveed Diggs			
L'Empereur (March of the Penguins 2: The Next Step)	February 15, 2017	N/A	France	Lambert Wilson (FR); Morgan Freeman (US)			Wild Bunch; Bonne Pioche Cinéma; Paprika Films; Wild-Touch Production; OCS; France 3
Born in China	April 21, 2017	Ghost of the Mountains	Worldwide	John Krasinski	$5–10	$25.1	Shanghai Media Group; Chuan Films; Brian Leith Productions
Born in China	April 21, 2017	Expedition China (Note: Expedition China is a Netflix original nature documentary film released on December 27, 2017, directed by Ben Wallis with narration by Maggie Q. The film which is based on clips from Born in China focuses on exploring the most remote wildlands in China.)	Worldwide	John Krasinski	$5–10	$25.1	Shanghai Media Group; Chuan Films; Brian Leith Productions
Blue (France)	March 28, 2018	Diving with Dolphins	France	Cécile de France			Silverback Films
Dolphin Reef (US)	April 3, 2020	Diving with Dolphins	North America	Natalie Portman			Silverback Films; Disney+
Penguins	April 17, 2019	Penguins: Life on the Edge	North America	Ed Helms		$7.7	Silverback Films
Elephant	April 3, 2020	In the Footsteps of Elephant	Worldwide (Disney+)	Meghan, Duchess of Sussex		N/A	Silverback Films; Wildstar Films
Polar Bear	April 22, 2022	Bear Witness	Worldwide (Disney+)	Catherine Keener		N/A	Silverback Films
Tiger	April 22, 2024	Tigers on the Rise	Worldwide (Disney+)	Priyanka Chopra		N/A	Wildstar Films
Sea Lions of the Galapagos	April 22, 2025	Guardians of the Galápagos	Worldwide (Disney+)	Brendan Fraser		N/A	Silverback Films
Orangutan	April 22, 2026	N/A	Worldwide (Disney+)	Josh Gad		N/A	Wildstar Films
Wolf	April 22, 2027		Worldwide (Disney+)	TBA		N/A	Silverback Films
