= The Crimson Wing: Mystery of the Flamingos =

- Official poster
- Directed by: Matthew Aeberhard; Leander Ward
- Written by: Melanie Finn
- Produced by: Matthew Aeberhard; Leander Ward; Paul Webster (executive producer); Stephen Garrett (executive producer)
- Narrated by: Mariella Frostrup (UK/US); Zabou Breitman (France); Karoline Herfurth (Germany)
- Music by: The Cinematic Orchestra
- Production companies: Disneynature; Natural Light Films; Kudos Pictures
- Distributed by: Walt Disney Studios Motion Pictures
- Release dates: 26 October 2008 (France); 29 September 2009 (United Kingdom)
- Running time: 78 minutes
- Countries: United Kingdom; United States
- Language: English

The Crimson Wing: Mystery of the Flamingos is a 2008 nature documentary that explores the great gathering of lesser flamingos which occurs every year at Lake Natron in Tanzania and along the salt lakes of the African Rift Valley. It was the first film released under the then-new Disneynature film label through Walt Disney Studios Motion Pictures. It premiered in France on 26 October 2008, with narration by Zabou Breitman. The film was released in theatres in the UK on 29 September 2009 and direct-to-video in the United States on 19 October 2010 with narration by Mariella Frostrup.

== Plot ==
The film documents the lives of the lesser flamingos on the isolated shores of Lake Natron in Tanzania, revealing the breeding and parenting habits of the species. After mating on an immense salt island, the flamingos breed their chicks, who learn to survive and grow up in an extreme and dangerous environment. In the course of their journeys, they encounter marabou storks who prey on eggs and newly born chicks and a spotted hyena who takes no pity on the adult flamingos.

As the film progresses, it focuses on the life of one of the female flamingo chicks. The young flamingo teaches herself the key habits of the species. She successfully grows up to become a large, pink feathered bird and survives when the group is attacked by the hyena. Her story shows the strength and determination for life the flamingos have. The film ends by emphasizing the importance of preserving Lake Natron from pollution and exploitation to ensure the survival of the lesser flamingos, as over 80% of birds from this species found in nature were born here.

== Release ==
After the launch of the Disneynature studio in April 2008, the first new production from the studio was revealed to be The Crimson Wing, which would begin international release throughout 2009. However, the first film to be released by Disneynature was the US domestic market release of the BBC Worldwide and Greenlight Media film Earth on Earth Day 2009, making The Crimson Wing the second film to be released by Disneynature.

The world premiere of The Crimson Wing took place on 26 October 2008 at the closing ceremony of the Cinéma Science Festival in Bordeaux, France. Starting on 25 September 2009, The Crimson Wing was released for a limited run in the United Kingdom exclusively through Cineworld cinemas.

The Crimson Wing was released on DVD and Blu-ray in the UK and France in March 2010. In Italy the film was broadcast on Sky Cinema 1 and 1 HD on 3 April of the same year with the title Il mistero dei fenicotteri rosa. It was then released on DTV in the US on 19 October.

== Soundtrack ==
The soundtrack to the film was composed and performed by the British jazz-electronic group The Cinematic Orchestra, who produced the soundtrack with Steve McLaughlin. Teese Gohl orchestrated the score, which was performed at Air Lyndhurst by The Cinematic Orchestra and the London Metropolitan Orchestra, conducted by Andy Brown. The music was mixed by McLaughlin and The Cinematic Orchestra at British Grove Studios and Northpole Studio. The composition was performed live by The Cinematic Orchestra with the London Metropolitan Orchestra at Union Chapel, Islington in London on 17 September 2009. In the same year it won the award for best original score at the Jackson Hole Wildlife Film Festival in Wyoming, USA on 1 October.

The original recordings of "Arrival of the Birds" and "Transformation" from the soundtrack were used in the last scene of the film The Theory of Everything and in the short film Together Apart from the Cornetto Cupidity Series. In December 2012, the song "Arrival of the Birds" appeared in a commercial for the women's perfume Acqua di Gioia by Giorgio Armani.

The score was originally set to be composed and performed by British singer-songwriter, musician, and producer Imogen Heap, for which she traveled to Tanzania, along with Ward, Aeberhard and crew, during the shooting of the film in 2006 and 2007. Due to conflicting timing with the delayed release of the film clashing with the recording of her new album at the time, the task passed on to The Cinematic Orchestra.

Mark Mancina composed the music for the Disneynature logo. He has previously written and composed an arrangement of "When You Wish Upon a Star" for the 2006 Disney logo with David Metzger as the co-arranger and orchestrator.

== Reception ==
=== Critical reception ===
On the review aggregator website Rotten Tomatoes, 75% of 20 critics' reviews are positive, with an average rating of 6.50/10.

=== Accolades ===
Year	Award	Category	Nominee(s)	Result	Ref.
2009	Jackson Hole Wildlife Film Festival	Best Music Score	The Cinematic Orchestra	Won	
2009	IFMCA Award	Best Original Score for a Documentary Film	The Cinematic Orchestra	Nominated	
