= Oceans (film) =

- French theatrical release poster
- Directed by: Jacques Perrin; Jacques Cluzaud (co-director)
- Written by: Christophe Cheysson; Jacques Cluzaud; Laurent Debas; Stéphane Durand; Laurent Gaudé; Jacques Perrin; François Sarano
- Produced by: Jacques Perrin; Romain Legrand; Nicolas Mauvernay; Jake Eberts
- Narrated by: Jacques Perrin (French); Pierce Brosnan (English)
- Cinematography: David Reichert
- Edited by: Catherine Mauchain; Vincent Schmidt
- Music by: Bruno Coulais
- Production companies: Pathé; Participant Media; Galatée Films; Notro Films; France 2 Cinéma; France 3 Cinéma; Canal+ TPS Star; Alfred P. Sloan Foundation; Census of Marine Life
- Distributed by: Pathé Distribution
- Release dates: October 17, 2009 (Tokyo International Film Festival); January 24, 2010 (France); April 22, 2010 (United States)
- Running time: 104 minutes (Original cut); 84 minutes (Disney cut)
- Countries: France; United States
- Languages: French; English
- Budget: €57.1 million; (US$80 million)
- Box office: $82.7 million

Oceans (French: Océans, also stylized as Ωceans) is a 2009 French nature documentary film directed, produced, co-written, and narrated by Jacques Perrin, with Jacques Cluzaud as co-director. The film, produced in association with the Census of Marine Life, explores the marine species of Earth's five oceans and reflects on the negative aspects of human activity on the environment, with Perrin (Pierce Brosnan in English) providing narration.

Budgeted at around $80 million, it was filmed in over 50 different places and took four years to film. In North America, the film was produced by Disneynature and distributed by Walt Disney Studios Motion Pictures, who cut 20 minutes mostly depicting violent massacres of sea animals (recreated through visual effects) in order to target a younger audience.

== Plot ==
Oceans presents details and facts about the journey of the ocean. The film begins on a beach with children running to the ocean, one particular boy stops to wonder what the ocean is. The scene cuts to the Galápagos where a clan of marine iguanas and horseshoe crabs wander. Then at night an Ariane rocket takes off and surprises the two clans. Meanwhile, the rocket takes off to outer space. Then goes to the trench where the larvae of sea urchin and the crustacean egg lie. Then comes to a swarm of moon jellyfish. Then at day, a different type of jellyfish float along the current.

Later at the coast of South Africa, a hungry mob of common dolphins, gannets, bronze whaler sharks, and brydes whales hunt sardines. After the feast, manta rays gobble down a few sardines. Moments later, a blanket octopus swims quietly along the current. Meanwhile, the sardines start making odd shapes. At a beach, sea lions rest in the sun. In deeper water, a humpback whale and her calf start to flipper slap, spyhop, and breach. Meanwhile, the sea lions start hunting. The others on the beach watch Sally Lightfoot crabs crawl on the sand. The hunting sea lions are returning home, but some are eaten by a great white shark and a killer whale. In the deeper waters, a blue whale feasts on some krill. At twilight, birds are flying back to their nests. At night, carnivores are out to hunt on the reef, including the mantis shrimp who kills a crab trespassing on its territory. In Australia, a Spanish dancer comes out of its home. At day, bottlenose dolphins are leaping on the waves. Meanwhile, a dugong and green sea turtle are feasting on sea grass. On the beach, baby sea turtles have to make it to the ocean without being eaten by frigatebirds, which only one baby turtle survives. In the sea, sailfish are feasting on fish.

At a coral reef, creatures are minding their own business. Beyond the reef, a cuttlefish is eating crabs. After that, garden eels and razorfish act really smooth. After that, spider crabs start war. Meanwhile, humpback whales, blue whales, sunfish, blue sharks, sperm whales and whale sharks migrate. Then a bunch of spinner dolphins, yellowfin tuna, and manta rays swim for a long time. Far away, an Asian sheepshead wrasse is mating. Miles away, a sea otter is smashing clams. In Alaska, the humpback whales have made it to the feeding grounds. The scene cuts to netted sea animals including tuna, whale sharks, sailfish, sea turtles, and sunfish. Along the way, a fishing boat has a hard time fighting the waves. Then a satellite shows the trash in the ocean. Underwater, tons of trash is destroying a fur seal's home. The scene cuts to the 2 polar regions, Arctic and Antarctica. Then, divers are discovering the ocean, and one of them swims with a great white shark. At the end, the narrator says "we shouldn't ask what exactly is the ocean, we should ask what exactly are we".

== Production ==
=== Filming ===
The documentary was produced in collaboration with scientists from the Census of Marine Life and employed technologies including stabilized cameras for rough seas, an electric mini-helicopter to approach and film marine animals without noise, and submerged cameras both towed and on poles over the side of vessels, resulting in film of over 200 species at more than 50 global locations.

== Release ==
The film was released in France on January 24, 2010, by Pathé Distribution. Pathé also handled international sales for the film.

== Music ==
Demi Lovato and Joe Jonas recorded a special duet for Disney's North American release titled, "Make a Wave". The documentary was accompanied by a score composed by Bruno Coulais, performed by the Paris Philharmonic Orchestra. The score features Coulais' trademark instrumentation and musical style, combining solo players, electronic enhancement effects and other unusual musical elements. Three themes are featured within the score, one of them adapted into a song entitled "Océan Will Be".

"Sailing My Life", sung by Ayaka Hirahara and Fujisawa Norisama, is the theme song for the Japanese version.

== Reception ==
The film has received positive reviews from critics. At the review aggregation website Rotten Tomatoes, the film has received an 81% fresh rating from overall critics from 62 reviews. Its consensus states: "Oceans adds another visually stunning chapter to the Disney Nature library". Another review aggregator, Metacritic, gave the film an average score of 79% based on 20 reviews. The world version of the film received much more praise than the US and Canada version.

The film opened briefly at #1, grossing $2,466,530 from 1,206 theaters on opening day, an excellent number in documentary standards, despite being far from the opening day total of its predecessor, Earth. However, the film was overshadowed by its competition with The Back-Up Plan and The Losers as well as continued success from How to Train Your Dragon and Date Night. The film grossed $6 million over the Friday-Sunday period, reaching eighth place at the box office, and taking somewhat less than Earth's $8.8 million, but taking more than March of the Penguins. It was the third highest-grossing opening for a documentary film. Despite grossing an additional $4 million over the week, the film collapsed 57% in its second weekend, a steeper drop than its predecessor, taking in $2.6 million from 1,210 theaters. The film earned an additional $2 million over the week and $1.6 million in its third weekend as well as expanding to 1,232 theaters and remaining in tenth place. The film was a disappointment at the United States box office as it closed on July 15, 2010 after only 85 days of release, earning $19,422,319 domestically, but the film earned $63,229,120 overseas for a total of $82,651,439 worldwide.

The film was released by Walt Disney Studios Home Entertainment on Blu-ray Disc and DVD on October 19, 2010.

== See also ==
- French frigate Latouche-Tréville, shown during a storm.
