= Earth (2007 film) =

2007 documentary film

- British theatrical release poster
- Directed by: Alastair Fothergill; Mark Linfield
- Written by: Leslie Megahey; Alastair Fothergill; Mark Linfield
- Produced by: Alix Tidmarsh; Sophokles Tasioulius
- Narrated by: Patrick Stewart (United Kingdom); Ulrich Tukur (Germany)
- Cinematography: Earth Camera Team
- Edited by: Martin Elsbury; Vartan Nazarian
- Music by: George Fenton; Berliner Philharmoniker
- Production companies: BBC Worldwide; Greenlight Media; Discovery Channel; BBC Natural History Unit
- Distributed by: Lionsgate UK (United Kingdom); Universum Film (through Walt Disney Studios Motion Pictures; Germany)
- Release dates: October 10, 2007 (France); November 16, 2007 (United Kingdom); January 12, 2008 (Germany)
- Running time: 99 minutes (Note: The United States version runs at 90 minutes.)
- Countries: United Kingdom; Germany
- Language: English
- Budget: $47 million
- Box office: $109 million

Earth is a 2007 nature documentary film which depicts the diversity of wild habitats and creatures across the planet. The film begins in the Arctic in January of one year and moves southward, concluding in Antarctica in the December of the same year. Along the way, it features the journeys made by three particular species—the polar bear, African bush elephant and humpback whale—to highlight the threats to their survival in the face of rapid environmental change. A companion piece to the 2006 BBC Worldwide/Discovery Channel/NHK/Canadian Broadcasting Corporation television series Planet Earth, the film uses many of the same sequences, though most are edited differently, and features footage not seen on TV.

A British-German co-production, Earth was directed by Planet Earth executive producer Alastair Fothergill and Mark Linfield, the producer of Planet Earth's "From Pole to Pole" and "Seasonal Forests" episodes. It was produced by BBC, Discovery, BBC Natural History Unit and Greenlight Media, with Discovery Network providing some of the funding. The British release featured narration from Patrick Stewart and was distributed by Lionsgate UK, while the German release was narrated by Ulrich Tukur and distributed by Walt Disney Studios Motion Pictures under Universum Film.

Earth premiered in France on 10 October 2007, before releasing in the United Kingdom that same year on 16 November, and in Germany on 12 January 2008. Additionally, the American version—narrated by James Earl Jones and runs 9 minutes shorter than its international counterparts—was later released on 22 April 2009, by Disney under their Disneynature label. With total worldwide box office revenue exceeding $100 million, Earth is the second-highest-grossing nature documentary of all time, behind March of the Penguins (2005). A sequel, titled Earth: One Amazing Day, was released in the United States on 6 October 2017. It made its world premiere in Beijing.

== Plot ==
Over the course of a calendar year, Earth takes the viewer on a journey from the North Pole in January to the South in December, revealing how plants and animals respond to the power of the sun and the changing seasons. The film focuses on three particular species, the polar bear, African bush elephant and humpback whale.

Starting in the high Arctic in January, as the darkness of winter gives way to the sun, a mother polar bear is shown emerging from her den with two new cubs. She needs food and must lead her cubs to her hunting ground on the sea ice before it begins to break up. By April, the sun never sets, and by August all the sea ice has melted. The mother and cubs have retreated to dry land, but a male polar bear is trapped at sea and must seek out land by swimming. He reaches an island with a walrus colony but is too exhausted to make a successful kill. He dies from injuries sustained in a walrus attack.

African bush elephants are filmed from the air as they negotiate a dust storm in the Kalahari Desert. June is the dry season and they must follow ancient paths passed down through generations to reach watering holes. A mother and calf are separated from the herd in the storm but manage to reach shelter. The matriarch leads the herd to a temporary watering hole, but they must share it with hungry lions and scavenger white-backed vultures. The lions are shown attacking a solitary elephant at night, when their superior vision gives them the upper hand. The herd times its arrival at the Okavango Delta to coincide with seasonal floodwaters which transform the desert into a lush water world.

A humpback whale mother and calf are filmed from the air and underwater at their breeding grounds in the shallow seas of the tropics. There is nothing here for the mother to eat, so she must guide her calf on a 4,000-mile (6,400 km) journey south to the rich feeding grounds near Antarctica, the longest migration of any marine mammal. En route, they navigate dangerous seas where great white sharks are filmed breaching as they hunt. Sea lions, and sailfish and dolphins combine to bait a shoal of small fish. By October they enter polar waters, and by December the Antarctic sun has melted the sea ice to form sheltered bays. Here, the whales are shown feeding on krill by trapping them in bubble nets.

The stories of these individual creatures are woven into the film alongside a great many additional scenes. The supporting cast of animals include mandarin ducklings filmed jumping from their tree hole nest, Arctic wolves hunting caribou, cheetah hunting Thomson's gazelle, elephants charging at white-backed vulture, birds of paradise displaying in the New Guinea rainforest, Adelie penguins in the Antarctic and demoiselle cranes on their autumn migration across the Himalayas.

== Themes ==
The narration is woven around the theme of anthropogenic environmental change. The three species it features are used to illustrate particular threats to the planet's wildlife. In the Arctic, rising temperatures are causing a greater area of sea ice to melt and threatening the polar bear with extinction as early as 2030. Global warming is also disrupting the planet's weather systems and making seasonal rainfall patterns less predictable. This poses a threat to creatures like elephants, which must travel greater distances to reach water. Rising ocean temperatures have started to kill the plankton on which humpback whales and most other sea life depend. The film ends with the message that "it's not too late to make a difference".

== Narrators by language ==
- James Earl Jones - American English
- Patrick Stewart - British English
- Anggun - French
- Ulrich Tukur - German
- Paolo Bonolis - Italian
- Ken Watanabe - Japanese
- Constantino Romero - Spanish

== Production ==
Earth was produced by Alix Tidmarsh of BBC Worldwide and Sophokles Tasioulis of Greenlight Media. Following Deep Blue, it is the second film of a five-picture deal between the two companies. The process of bringing Planet Earth and Earth to the screen took over five years. With a budget of $47 million, the film was the most expensive production in the history of documentary filmmaking at the time, later to be surpassed by Oceans. Principal photography began in 2004 and was completed in 2006.

== Release ==
The film's tentative title was titled Planet Earth, the same as the BBC TV series. In February 2005, BBC Worldwide pre-sold distribution rights to Gaumont in France, Wanda Vision in Spain, and Frenetic Films in Switzerland.

Lionsgate Films acquired US, UK and Australian distribution rights to the film in the early 2007. Outside of those territories, additional companies who acquired the film included Universum Film in Germany, GAGA Corporation in Japan, and Audio Visual Enterprises/Prooptiki in Greece. After this initial acquirements, Earth received its world premiere at Spain's San Sebastián International Film Festival in September. It was released across Europe in the fourth quarter of 2007 and early 2008 to much success.

For unknown reasons, Lionsgate never released the film in the US as originally intended, and in April 2008, the North American distribution rights to Earth were acquired by the Walt Disney Studios. The film was released under their then-new Disneynature film unit, which specialises in natural history documentaries for the first time since True-Life Adventures (2008). The film was released in the US on 22 April 2009, with James Earl Jones narrating, with Chris Bacon composing the additional music in George Fenton's score for this version. Walt Disney Studios Motion Pictures also acquired distribution of the film in Canada, Italy, Germany (under Universum Film's deal with the company) and Latin American countries as well.

Walt Disney Studios Home Entertainment released the film on DVD and Blu-ray in September 2009, becoming the first film released by Disneynature to be released on both formats.

== Regional differences ==
In addition to replacing Patrick Stewart with James Earl Jones as a narrator, the U.S. version uses a more dramatic soundtrack and runs only 90 minutes, compared to the original cut's 99 minutes, due to Disney holding the rights to the film.

== Reception ==
=== Critical response ===
Rotten Tomatoes reported that 87% of critics gave the film positive reviews based on 91 reviews, the second-highest score of all the Disneynature films (behind Monkey Kingdom, which has a score of 93%), with an average score of 7.2 out of 10. Its consensus states: "With its spectacular and extensive footage, Earth is both informative and entertaining". Another review aggregator, Metacritic, gave an average score of 72, being a generally favourable review, based on 26 reviews.

=== Box office ===
On its first day of release in the US, Earth opened at #1, grossing $4,023,788 from 1,810 theaters. For its first weekend, it opened at #5, grossing $8,825,760, as well as $14,472,792 over the five-day period. Despite dropping to #7 the next weekend, taking in $4,340,235, it took in $12,017,017 over the previous week (including Sunday), and ending up with a two-week total of $22,004,284. It closed on July 30, 2009 after 100 days of release, ending up with a final gross of $32,011,576, making it one of the highest-grossing documentary films in the US.

Earth picked up an additional $76,931,115 at the international box office. It took over $30 million in Germany alone, became one of the three highest-grossing films of the year in France and had the best opening of any natural history documentary in Spain. By contrast, in the UK Earth debuted on just 14 screens and amassed less than £75,000 in ticket sales.

In January 2008, the Japanese version of Earth, narrated by actor Ken Watanabe, knocked Hollywood blockbuster I Am Legend off the top of the box office despite opening on half the number of screens. It went on to gross more than 2 billion yen ($18.5 million), making it the most successful documentary there of the last 10 years.

Its worldwide total of $108,942,691 made Earth a commercial success and placed it second on the all-time list of highest-grossing nature documentaries, behind March of the Penguins.

== Sequel ==
A sequel, Earth: One Amazing Day, was released on 6 October 2017. The film was narrated by Robert Redford.
