= Sea Lions of the Galapagos =

2025 American nature documentary film about sea lions

- Official release poster
- Directed by: Hugh Wilson; Keith Scholey
- Produced by: Hugh Wilson; Keith Scholey; Roy Conli
- Narrated by: Brendan Fraser
- Cinematography: Richard Wollocombe; Paul D. Stewart
- Edited by: Andy Netley
- Music by: Raphaelle Thibaut
- Production companies: Disneynature; Silverback Films
- Distributed by: Disney+
- Release date: April 22, 2025
- Running time: 83 minutes
- Country: United States
- Language: English

Sea Lions of the Galapagos is a 2025 American nature documentary film about Galápagos sea lions directed by Hugh Wilson and Keith Scholey, with narration by Brendan Fraser. It is the eighteenth nature documentary to be released under the Disneynature label. The film was released as a Disney+ exclusive on Earth Day April 22, 2025 and received positive reviews from critics.

== Plot ==
Leo, a Galápagos sea lion pup, lives in a colony on the Galápagos Islands, ruled by a beachmaster, the lone adult Galapagos male sea lion in charge of a group of mother Galapagos sea lions and their pups. During Leo's childhood, his mother Luna teaches him how to swim. As Leo grows older, the beachmaster exiles Leo from the islands, forcing him to find a new home. Years pass, he tries and fails to find a new forever home, while temporarily coming across other exiled Galapagos sea lions and hungry Galapagos sharks. Going off on his journey solo, he finally claims an island of his own by banishing its beachmaster.

== Production ==
Brendan Fraser served as the narrator of Disneynature's documentary about Galápagos sea lions. Hugh Wilson and Keith Scholey directed and produced the film for producer Roy Conli. Scholey previously directed Disneynature's African Cats (2011), Bears (2014), and Dolphin Reef (2020). In March 2025, it was revealed that Raphaelle Thibaut would compose the film's score. The soundtrack was released alongside the film on April 22, 2025. Richard Wollocombe and Paul D. Stewart served as the film's cinematographers, having previously worked on the BBC docuseries Galápagos (2006).

== Release ==
Sea Lions of the Galapagos was released as a Disney+ exclusive on Earth Day April 22, 2025. Coinciding with its release, the film was accompanied by a making-of documentary titled Guardians of the Galápagos, narrated by Blair Underwood.

== Reception ==
Sean Boelman of Fandom Wire praised the film for its wonderment and natural beauty, stating its "a fun and educational ride for families". Marshal Knight of Laughing Place gave a positive review, summarizing that the film is a "return to form for Disneynature". DeVonne Goode of Parents praised the visuals, commenting that "the shots the camera crew were able to get are truly magical". Roger Palmer of Whatsondisneyplus.com also gave a positive review, highlighting the film's "beautiful" cinematography.

Tyler Collins of Flamborough Today, further praised the film, claiming it "is probably Disneynature's most exciting movie since 2020's Dolphin Reef, and possibly one of the best ever". Preston Barta of Denton Record-Chronicle gave the film a 4/5 star rating, summarizing that "with Fraser's affable guidance, it transforms from mere entertainment into a gentle nudge toward environmental stewardship. We leave not just entertained but inspired, armed with fresh awe for both the sea lions of today and the ecological tapestry from which they spring." J. Kelly Nestruck of The Globe and Mail praised the "amazing action sequence involving sharks, sea lions, pelicans and fish all in a high-speed, food-chain chase". Jennifer Green of Common Sense Media rated the film 4 out of 5 stars, praising the film for its "gorgeous cinematography, epic storytelling, and a memorable celebrity voiceover".
