= Breaking Boundaries =

2021 British documentary film

Breaking Boundaries: The Science of Our Planet
- Film poster
- Directed by: Jon Clay
- Produced by: Alastair Fothergill; Colin Butfield; Kate Garwood; Keith Scholey; Jochen Zeitz
- Starring: David Attenborough; Johan Rockström
- Music by: Hannah Cartwright; Ross Tones
- Production companies: Silverback Films; Indikate Productions
- Release date: 4 June 2021
- Running time: 73 minutes
- Country: United Kingdom
- Language: English

Breaking Boundaries: The Science of Our Planet is a 2021 documentary film directed by Jon Clay, and presented by David Attenborough and Johan Rockström.

== Synopsis ==
Breaking Boundaries tells the story how humans are pushing Earth beyond the boundaries that have kept the planet stable for 10,000 years, following scientific journey of Rockström and his team's discovery of the nine planetary boundaries.

== Production ==
The film was released on Netflix on 4 June 2021. Alongside the film's release, a book of the same name was published, with a foreword from Greta Thunberg. The film was directed by Jon Clay, and executive produced by Alastair Fothergill, Colin Butfield, Kate Garwood, Keith Scholey, and Jochen Zeitz. Original music was composed by Hannah Cartwright and Ross Tones.

Attenborough had previously appeared in two other Netflix Original films, Our Planet and David Attenborough: A Life on Our Planet.

== Reception ==
"Breaking Boundaries" may have interesting — even critical — information to convey about the future of our species and the fate of the planet. But the form is so insane that the message is nearly lost in the muddle.

— Calum Marsh

Reviews of Breaking Boundaries were generally mixed. On the review aggregator website Rotten Tomatoes, 50% of ten critics' reviews are positive, with an average rating of 6.20/10.

Kevin Maher gave the film three out of five stars. The New York Times' Calum Marsh criticised the films use of visualisations, in particular the CGI humans, as "laughable" in effect. Elle Hunt noted that the film is unusual compared to most Attenborough documentaries in that it focuses on planetary decline. Nick Allen of RogerEbert.com awarded the film two stars out of five.
