= Silverback Films =

Natural history production susbdiary of Banijay

- Type: Subsidiary
- Founded: 12 July 2012; 14 years ago
- Founders: Alastair Fothergill; Keith Scholey
- Parent: All3Media (2020–2026); Banijay UK (2026–)
- Divisions: Studio Silverback
- Website: silverbackfilms.tv

Silverback Films is a Bristol-based British natural history film and television production company owned by Banijay UK.

== History ==
Silverback Films was founded in 2012 by wildlife filmmakers Alastair Fothergill and Keith Scholey, who are known for producing wildlife documentaries and series in partnership with major broadcasters like Netflix, the BBC, and Disney.

In December 2020, Silverback Films launched its feature film production division, Studio Silverback, to focus solely on films that tackle the world’s pressing environmental challenges. This would be led by co-founders Fothergill and Scholey, along with Jonnie Hughes and Colin Butfield.

At the start of November 2022, Silverback Films formed a partnership with Steven Spielberg's American entertainment company Amblin Partners via its television production division of Amblin Television, and later under its documentary arm Amblin Documentaries, to produce a series of natural history docuseries for Netflix. The series started with the nature documentary miniseries Life on Our Planet, produced by Silverback Films and Amblin Television and released in 2023.

== Description ==
Silverback Films is a film production company owned by Banijay UK. Based in Bristol, England, it produces natural history documentary films.

== Filmography ==
Title	Years	Network	Notes
North America	2013	Discovery Channel	co-production with Discovery Channel
Bears	2014	Cinema release	co-production with Disneynature
The Hunt	2015	BBC One	co-production with BBC, Open University, CCTV-9 and NDR Naturfilm
Monkey Kingdom	2015	Cinema release	co-production with Disneynature and Crazy Ape Productions
Dolphin Reef	2018	Cinema release	co-production with Disneynature
Our Planet	2019-2023	Netflix	co-production with World Wildlife Fund
Dancing with the Birds	2019	Netflix	
Penguins	2019	Cinema release	co-production with Disneynature
David Attenborough: A Life on Our Planet	2020	Netflix	co-production with Altitude Film Entertainment and Netflix
Elephant	2020	Disney+	co-production with Disneynature and Wildstar Films
A Perfect Planet	2021	BBC One	
Breaking Boundaries	2021	Netflix	co-production with Indikate Productions
Polar Bear	2022	Disney+	co-production with Disneynature
Life on Our Planet	2023	Netflix	co-production with Amblin Television
Wild Isles	2023	BBC One	co-production with RSPB, World Wide Fund for Nature and Open University
Ocean with David Attenborough	2025	Cinema release	co-production with Open Planet Studios, Altitude Film Entertainment, and Minderoo Productions
Parenthood	2025	BBC One	co-production with All3Media International
Sea Lions of the Galapagos	2025	Disney+	co-production with Disneynature
The Dinosaurs	2026	Netflix	co-production with Amblin Documentaries
Secret of the Bees	2026	National Geographic	co-production with National Geographic Studios and Lightstorm Earth
