= The Aeronauts (soundtrack) =

2019 film soundtrack album

The Aeronauts (Original Motion Picture Soundtrack)

Film score by Steven Price
- Released: 1 November 2019
- Recorded: 2019
- Studios: Abbey Road Studios, London; British Grove Studios, London
- Genre: Film score
- Length: 62:52
- Label: Decca
- Producer: Steven Price

Steven Price chronology
Ophelia (2019)	The Aeronauts (2019)	Dolphin Reef (2020)

The Aeronauts (Original Motion Picture Soundtrack) is the film score to the 2019 film The Aeronauts directed by Tom Harper starring Eddie Redmayne, Felicity Jones, Himesh Patel and Tom Courtenay. The original score is composed by Steven Price and is conducted by Geoff Alexander, which was recorded at the Abbey Road Studios and British Grove Studios in London. It was released through Decca Records on 1 November 2019.

== Development ==
In June 2019, it was announced that Steven Price would compose the score for The Aeronauts. Price discussed with harper to take the surrounding environment of the film's setting as the inspiration for the score, which included the sound of the wind and air, provided something unique. In order to put the audience in the sky with the characters onscreen, Price wanted to make a difference between the music heard onscreen when the audience sees the paths of the people on ground, and when these characters are in air. On the ground, Price focused on the use of strings, piano and other conventional instruments, while airbone, Price used instruments driven by wind, such as brass and woodwinds.

Mark Eckersley who served as the music editor, noted on how Price used several instrumentalists blowing over mouthpieces and the sound of air being woven into the score, as well as utilizing those wind instruments on air and string instruments on ground. Eckersley noted that Price had good instincts on spotting of music why he left to them, as Harper and Price discussed on where the cues existed, where they needed and where they did not, while he was reliant with sound effects of wind.

== Release ==
Decca Records released the film's soundtrack digitally on 1 November 2019, and in physical formats on 6 December 2019.

== Reception ==
Tomris Laffly of Variety described it an "old-fashioned score". Rohan Naahar of Hindustan Times stated "The hiring of Steven Price to compose the score for The Aeronauts ... is either purely coincidental or cleverly orchestrated. [His] music, despite more obvious attractions such as the breathtaking visuals and the strong central performances, is one of the most enjoyable aspects of a film that is brimming with technical excellence." Critic based at Flickering Myth called it a "rousing score". Chris Bumbray of JoBlo.com called it "a dynamic score". Nguyen Le of The Young Folks wrote "Steven Price’s score stays heroic and brings Gravity to the 1860s".

== Track listing ==
No.	Title	Artist	Length
1.	"She's Late"		2:24
2.	"We Will Break That Record"		2:32
3.	"Anything Can Happen In This Weather"		2:07
4.	"You'll Get Your Chance"		1:55
5.	"And So It Begins"		4:01
6.	"We Rose Above It"		1:43
7.	"Have You Noticed"		2:28
8.	"Of All the Amazing Things"		2:28
9.	"We Have a Policy"		1:56
10.	"Dancing In a Parachute"		1:04
11.	"Do You Have Faith"		3:25
12.	"An Obligation"		2:23
13.	"Imagine That Story Again"		4:05
14.	"Somewhere I Belong"		4:28
15.	"I Can't Let This Happen Again"		2:55
16.	"And Now Snow"		1:55
17.	"For Science"		8:25
18.	"The Sky Lies Open"		4:08
19.	"We Took To the Skies"		4:49
20.	"Home to You"	Sigrid	3:41
Total length:			62:52

== Personnel ==
Credits adapted from liner notes:

- Music composer and producer – Steven Price
- Orchestra – London Symphony Orchestra
- Orchestrator and conductor – Geoff Alexander
- Orchestra leader – Everton Nelson
- Chorus – London Voices
- Choirmaster – Ben Parry
- Recording – John Barratt, Gareth Cousins
- Mixing – Gareth Cousins

== Accolades ==
Award	Category	Recipients	Result	Ref.
Houston Film Critics Society Awards 2019	Best Original Song	"Home to You" – Sigrid	Nominated	
