= Dolphin Reef (film) =

2018 American nature documentary film about dolphins

- Official release poster
- Directed by: Alastair Fothergill; Keith Scholey
- Written by: David Fowler
- Produced by: Alastair Fothergill; Keith Scholey; Roy Conli
- Narrated by: Natalie Portman
- Cinematography: Paul Atkins
- Edited by: Martin Elsbury
- Music by: Steven Price
- Production companies: Disneynature; Silverback Films
- Distributed by: Walt Disney Studios Motion Pictures; Disney+
- Release dates: March 28, 2018 (France); April 3, 2020 (Disney+)
- Running time: 78 minutes
- Country: United States
- Language: English

Dolphin Reef is a 2018 American nature documentary film about dolphins directed by Alastair Fothergill and Keith Scholey and narrated by Natalie Portman. It is the fourteenth nature documentary to be released under the Disneynature label. The film was released theatrically on March 28, 2018, in France under the title Blue with actress Cécile de France providing narration.

It was originally scheduled to be released theatrically on April 20, 2018, in the United States under the title Dolphins with narration by Owen Wilson, but was confirmed to be taken off the theatrical calendar the week of release. It was then announced that the film would be released at the launch of Disney+, making it the first Disneynature film to be released exclusively on the streaming platform in the United States, with Natalie Portman narrating, but Disney+ launched without Dolphin Reef being available to watch.

The film was finally released alongside Elephant as a Disney+ exclusive on April 3, 2020. Dolphin Reef received largely positive critical reviews.

== Plot ==
In the reefs near a group of French Polynesian islands in the South Pacific, Echo is a young and playful bottlenose dolphin who isn't like the rest of his pod. He believes he's just not ready to grow up, but his mother, Kumu, tries teaching him to find his own food. Just as they depart for their coral reef home, Echo's favorite neighbour, Mr. Mantis, a peacock mantis shrimp, is being disrupted by other sea creatures of his pile of coral.

One night while the rest of the pod is asleep, Echo is surprised to be greeted by a female mother humpback whale named Mo'orea, who has traveled miles to Echo's homes to find a male partner to help protect her newborn daughter, Fluke (who doesn't seem sure about Echo at first, but eventually accepts him as a friend). Kumu soon calls out for her son, and Echo bids farewell to the two whales. Kumu then grounds Echo for hanging out with the whales miles away, much to Echo's dismay. Many male humpback whales are about to set off to fight over Mo'orea and Fluke, but the largest one is more determined.

Mr. Mantis, meanwhile, is having his own problems trying to get his coral together and trying to get his fellow gardeners to work, but to his surprise, a school of green humphead parrotfish comes to the rescue to clean out the coral, while Mr. Mantis and his neighbors are confronted by a cuttlefish, who strikes a small crab trying to invade Mr. Mantis' home. Meanwhile, a pod of killer whales arrive on the island looking for prey; for Fluke's safety, Mo'orea makes contact with the male humpbacks, and they all set off for their rescue, just as the killer whales are about to charge for Fluke. The large male fends off the invaders, and wins over Mo'orea and Fluke's hearts.

As night falls, Echo and his pod are confronted by another pod of rival dolphins. The home team and rivals fight each other, while Echo swims off and is lost. Kumu and the rest of the pod spend hours looking for him. Echo, who has become lost in the dark sea, meets a sea turtle, and the two escape up to the surface for air. Echo survives the night, and is reunited with Kumu. Kumu starts to teach her son how to hunt fish, she uses her tail to make a mud ring to block the fish. Echo successfully copies the same, and he and the rest of the pod enjoy their meal of fish. Back on Coral Reef, Mr. Mantis is confronted by the Cuttlefish. Before it can catch him with its mouth, Echo comes to the rescue.

Echo has now learned the importance of how to survive the ocean, thanks to his mother. Mo'orea and Fluke begin a new life with the large male, who fathers Fluke, and Mr. Mantis continues to enjoy his pile of coral. Soon, Echo and Fluke become best friends and live a happy life together with their families.

== Cast ==
- Natalie Portman as the narrator

== Themes ==
The whole idea of the film is actually based on very hard-nosed ecology. The coral reef can actually only functions with a lot of participants doing different roles in a very ordered and organized way ... If anyone who watches the film comes away thinking, 'if you live in the ocean, you need friends', that for us is a success story. Then, we hope that will translate into you can't just start overfishing certain species because the community will not survive if you kind of do that. So, there is a bigger message in the film.

— Scholey, in an interview with Screen Fish

Through the antics of Echo, the film asserts that children should listen to their parents. Producer Roy Conli said that "it was clear that the way that a mother and young dolphin react is that the mother is truly the supervisor and is responsible, post weaning, to bring a male or female young dolphin to maturity".

The film also promotes conservation of the reefs. Its "making-of" documentary, Diving with Dolphins, revealed that in the three years of production of the film, one-third of the reef used on location died. Despite this, Scholey said: "If the young people can fall in love with the ocean and its creatures, the oceans have a hope. That's why I make these films. That's the goal".

== Development ==
The heroes of these films are the cinematographers who are out in the field.

— Producer Roy Conli in an interview with Collider.

Owen Wilson was slated to be the original narrator, before the job went to Natalie Portman. Disneynature had invited her to a screening of one of their previous projects, back when Portman was living in Paris, and she brought her child along for the viewing. At the event, she expressed a desire to voice one of their documentaries in the future. In her 20s, she learned to scuba dive with dolphins (off the coast of Eilat, Israel, situated on the Red Sea) and was excited to join the cast. Keith Scholey is the director, who also directed Disneynature's African Cats (2011) and Bears (2014), and Roy Conli is its producer.

It required research to find a dolphin pod that would allow humans to film. The featured pod is in the Red Sea.

== Production ==
It took over three years to make the production. The filming was done in French Polynesia, Hawaii, and Florida by cinematographers Roger Horrocks, Paul Atkins, Didier Noirot (who previously worked on Jacques Cousteau's crew) and Jamie McPherson. Scientists on hand were Angela Ziltener, Laura Engelby and Joe Mobley. The fact that dolphins are always in motion and can move very quickly presented a challenge during filming. Horrok said that while dolphins are the "most welcome" animals he's ever filmed, he conceded that "filming dolphins is the most physical because they're constantly on the move". Along that same vein, Conli said "that it's really difficult to stay up with one dolphin. There was one Echo, who was the guiding force, and then I like to say that Echo had a lot of stunt doubles". For fast moving scenes, shots were captured on a scooter fitted with a torpedo-like propeller. As it is impossible to follow a dolphin for an extended amount of time, cinematographers would film as long as they could, gathering thousands of hours of footage. They would also film elements from the dolphins' environment. The editing team (led by Martin Elsbury) then pieced together a narrative that, according to Scholey, is "true to the life of a dolphin".

Photography not taken underwater was done by bot, from jet ski, or from helicopter.

Portman recorded her narration in a studio in Los Angeles. The directors provided notes on the behavior happening on screen to inform her narration.

== Release ==
The film was released in 2018 in France with the title Blue and with Cecile de France as its narrator. Original trailers for the American release (under its formal title Dolphins) indicated a release date of Earth Day 2018.

Diving With Dolphins is a behind-the-scenes look at the making of Dolphin Reef. The documentary shares a director in Keith Scholey, but is narrated by Celine Cousteau, the granddaughter of oceanographer Jacques Cousteau.

== Reception ==
=== Critical response ===
On the review aggregator website Rotten Tomatoes, 100% of 19 critics' reviews are positive. Metacritic, which uses a weighted average, assigned the film a score of 79 out of 100, based on 5 critics, indicating "generally favorable" reviews.

Owen Gleiberman with Variety called the film "a puckish, bedazzling, and memorable entry in the Disney nature canon". Frank Scheck of The Hollywood Reporter commented on the film's "gorgeous cinematography and canny editing typical of Disney nature docs as well as Portman's soothingly lighthearted, bedtime story-style narration that turns serious at just the right times". Steve Pond with TheWrap called it "the Goodfellas of nature docs", saying "'Dolphin Reef' is a satisfying entry in the Disneynature slate, albeit one where the dolphins in the title are upstaged by some of their supporting cast, and the reef itself is even more spectacular than the creatures who get the most screen time". In his review, Daniel Rutledge said the film was "the delightful, wondrous joy", adding that "Natalie Portman is ideal as the voiceover star", and "the photography is also consistently brilliant with the camera operators getting right up amongst the dolphins and whales and in amazingly tight on the little coral creatures". Owen Gleiberman of Variety found that the film depicts a stunning vision on the ecosystem of marine life through its sequences, praised the film for its educational value, and found the movie emotional and authentic with its narrative. Jennifer Green of Common Sense Media graded the film 4 out of 5 stars, acclaimed the film for its educational value, stating it provides the hallmarks, behaviors, and ecosystem of marine life, praised the depiction of positive messages, such as loyalty and teamwork, while complimenting how the film explains the roles of sea creatures.

== Music ==
Steven Price (of Gravity, Our Planet, and Suicide Squad) composed the film's original score. He said scoring the film was "fun" since the "flow of water is so musical" and Disneynature still "values tunes ... and emotional music". He also noted that, historically, Disney has produced nature films as "family-based thing", but that this story focused on being ecologically sound, about "the interconnection of everything", and character driven. He says this approach led him to approach writing in a different way. Price led a 76-piece orchestra with a choir of 24 female voices at Abbey Road studio. He also employed the use of synthesizers to capture the "colors" of the underwater story.

=== Soundtrack ===
Disney made the soundtrack available for digital release on April 3, 2020. The following is a list of tracks on the commercially available original soundtrack.

No.	Title	Length
1.	"A Different Set of Rules"	2:21
2.	"Flook"
3.	"The Clam Shell Challenge"
4.	"Introducing the Dolphins"
5.	"The Nightmare of Mr. Mantis"
6.	"The Coral Clean Up Squad"
7.	"Safety in Numbers"
8.	"When They Meet It Is Magical"
9.	"There Is Unexpected Treasure Here"
10.	"Fine Sand Evacuation"
11.	"Get Off My Lawn"
12.	"The Great Contest Has Begun"
13.	"The Cleaning Station"
14.	"Strongest of the Humpbacks"
15.	"Ambush"
16.	"Lionfish in the Moonlight"
17.	"The Largest Breath of Air"
18.	"The Largest Breath of Air"
19.	"High Speed Hydroplaning"
20.	"A Very Special Trick"
21.	"Times of Crisis"
22.	"Echo Fires Up Another"
23.	"The Pulsating Blob of Death"
24.	"A Great Example"
25.	"Out to Sea"
