= A Life on Our Planet =

2020 non-fiction book by David Attenborough

- Front cover
- Author: David Attenborough; Jonnie Hughes
- Genre: Non-fiction
- Publisher: Ebury Publishing
- Publication date: 6 October 2020
- Pages: 272
- ISBN: 9781529108279

A Life on Our Planet: My Witness Statement and a Vision for the Future is a 2020 book by documentarian David Attenborough and director-producer Jonnie Hughes. It follows Attenborough's career as a presenter and natural historian, along with the decline in wildlife and rising carbon emissions during the period. Attenborough warns of the effects that climate change and biodiversity loss will have in the near future, and offers action which can be taken to prevent natural disaster. A companion book to the film David Attenborough: A Life on Our Planet, it was positively received by critics.

== Background ==
David Attenborough: A Life on Our Planet is a 2020 film by the documentarian and natural historian David Attenborough. Jonnie Hughes served as director and producer, as he has on Attenborough's documentaries since 2000. Initially scheduled for cinematic release on 16 April 2020, the film was delayed due to the COVID-19 pandemic. The film premiered on 28 September 2020 in cinemas and debuted on the online streaming platform Netflix on 4 October.

A Life on Our Planet is the companion book to the film, released on 6 October 2020. It was written by Attenborough and Hughes, who was assisted by the World Wide Fund for Nature's science team.

== Synopsis ==
The book opens in Pripyat, an area deserted after the Chernobyl disaster. Its first part, My Witness Statement, details key moments in Attenborough's career and the parallel decline of wildlife and rise in carbon emissions. Each chapter begins with three statistics about the period which it covers: world population, atmospheric carbon dioxide and remaining wilderness. What Lies Ahead, the second part, is about the global warming and species extinction which will continue and accelerate if human behaviour continues unchanged into the future. A Vision for the Future: How to Rewild the World, the third and final section, details measures which can be taken to avoid catastrophe and live sustainably.

As a child, Attenborough enjoyed studying fossils. His documentary career began in the 1950s when he began working for the BBC, a British public service broadcaster. He visited places such as the African Serengeti, in which native animals require vast areas of land to maintain grazing patterns. Over time, he noticed a decline in wildlife when searching for fish or orangutans or other animals which he was looking for as part of his documentaries. Areas of the Arctic or Antarctic were different to what the filming crew expected due to ice caps melting. The causes are anthropogenic climate change and biodiversity loss pushing the planet towards a sixth mass extinction event over a period of centuries rather than the hundreds of millennia that built up to previous mass extinctions.

Attenborough describes the book as his "witness statement" and gives an impression of what could happen to the planet over the course of a lifetime beginning in 2020 and lasting as long as his own, were human activity to continue unchanged. The Amazon rainforest could degrade into a savanna; the Arctic could lose all ice during summer; coral reefs could die; soil overuse could cause food crises. These irreversible events would cause mass extinction and exacerbate climate change further.

However, Attenborough describes actions which could prevent these effects and combat climate change and biodiversity loss. He proposes that bringing countries out of poverty, providing universal healthcare and improving girls' education would make the growing human population stabilise sooner and at a lower level. Renewable energy such as solar, wind, water and geothermal could sustainably power all human energy usage. Protecting a third of coastal areas from fishing could allow fish populations to thrive and the remaining area would be sufficient for human consumption. Humans changing their diet to eliminate or reduce meat in favour of plant-based foods could allow land to be used far more efficiently. Attenborough cites government intervention in Costa Rica causing deforestation to reverse, Palau's fishing regulations and improved use of land in the Netherlands as good examples.

== Reception ==
Pilita Clark included the book on the Financial Times' list of best books of 2020, under the category "Environment". Clark found that it "may not be entirely original but it is an important message from a messenger without parallel". A starred review for Kirkus Reviews praised the book as "excellent", finding Attenborough "refreshingly optimistic" and the book useful for "anyone concerned with the planet's ecological future". Bryan Appleyard of The Times found that Attenborough's "special pleading is fair and should be noted by other eco-warriors" and recommended the book both "to learn" and "to honour the man". James Bradley of The Sydney Morning Herald found the book "extremely powerful", writing that Attenborough "captures the accelerating ruination of the planet in the starkest possible terms".

== Translations ==
- Croatian: Život na našem planetu: Moje svjedočanstvo i vizija budućnosti. Translated by Dubravka Pleše. Zagreb: Školska knjiga. 2020. ISBN 9789530621152.
- Finnish: Yksi elämä, yksi planeetta: Näkemys ihmeellisen maailmamme tulevaisuudesta. Translated by Ilkka Rekiaro. Helsinki: WSOY. 2020. ISBN 9789510456583.
- German: Ein Leben auf unserem Planeten: Die Zukunftsvision des berühmtesten Naturfilmers der Welt, lit. 'A Life on Our Planet: The Vision of the Future of the World's Most Famous Nature Filmmaker'. Translated by Alexandra Hölscher. Munich: Blessing. 2020. ISBN 9783896676917.
- Hungarian: Egy élet a bolygónkon: A szemtanú vallomása - és látomás a Föld jövőjéről. Translated by Benjamin Makovecz. Budapest: Park Könyvkiadó. 2020. ISBN 9789633557006.
- Italian: La vita sul nostro pianeta: Come sarà il futuro?, lit. 'Life on Our Planet: What Will the Future be Like?'. Translated by Rachele Salerno. Milan: Piemme. 2020. ISBN 9788856677706.
- Serbian: Живот на нашој планети: моје сведочење и визија будућности, romanized: Život na našoj planeti : moje svedočenje i vizija budućnosti. Translated by Tatjana Bižić. Belgrade: Laguna. 2020. ISBN 9788652139217.
- Bulgarian: Живот на нашата планета, romanized: Zhivot na nashata planeta. Translated by Tsvetelina Yakova. Sofia: IK Khermes. ISBN 9789542621201.
- French: Une vie sur notre planète. Translated by Philippe Giraudon. Paris: Flammarion. 2021. ISBN 9782080249616.
- Greek: Η ζωή στον πλανήτη μας: Η μαρτυρία μου και ένα όραμα για το μέλλον, romanized: I zoí ston planíti mas: I martyría mou kai éna órama gia to méllon. Translated by Myrto Kalofolias. Athens: Patakis. 2021. ISBN 9789601693545.
- Lithuanian: Gyvenimas mūsų planetoje. Mano liudijimas ir ateities vizija. Translated by Jurgita Jėrinaitė. Vilnius: Helios. 2021. ISBN 9789949691951.
- Norwegian: Et liv på vår planet: Mitt vitnesbyrd og en visjon for fremtiden. Translated by Knut Ofstad. Oslo: Cappelen Damm. 2021. ISBN 9788202690243.
- Polish: Życie na naszej planecie: Moja historia, wasza przyszłość, lit. 'Life on Our Planet: My History, Your Future'. Translated by Paulina Surniak. Poznań: Wydawnictwo Poznańskie. 2021. ISBN 9788366657021.
- Russian: Жизнь на нашей планете: Мое предупреждение миру на грани катастрофы, romanized: Zhizn na nashey planete: Moye preduprezhdeniye miru na grani katastrofy, lit. 'Life on Our Planet: My Warning to the World on the Brink of Catastrophe'. Translated by Sergey Bavin. Moscow: BOMBORA. 2021. ISBN 9785041183585.
- Slovene: Življenje na našem planetu: moje pričevanje in videnje prihodnosti. Translated by Petra Anžlovar. Križe: Učila International. 2021. ISBN 9789610047506.
- Spanish: Una vida en nuestro planeta: Mi testimonio y una visión para el futuro. Translated by Tomás Fernández Aúz. Madrid: Crítica. 2021. ISBN 9788491993117.
- Turkish: Gezegenimizden Bir Yaşam: Tanıklık Ettiklerim ve Geleceğe Dair Bir Vizyon. Translated by Onur Uygun. Istanbul: Kronik. 2022. ISBN 978-625-8431-35-3
