= Steven Price (composer) =

English film composer (born 1977)

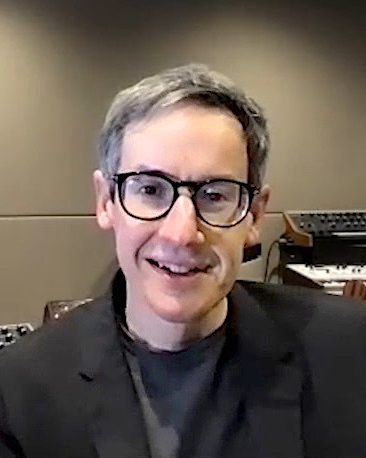
- Price in 2022

Background information
- Also known as: Steve Price; Steven B. Price
- Born: 22 April 1977 (age 49); Nottingham, Nottinghamshire, England
- Genre: Film score
- Occupation: Film composer
- Instruments: Piano; keyboards; guitar
- Years active: 1996–present

Steven Price (born 22 April 1977) is an English film composer, best known for scoring Gravity (2013), which won him the Academy Award for Best Original Score. Before making his debut as a composer with Attack the Block (2011), he worked on the music department for various notable films, such as The Lord of the Rings: The Two Towers (2002), The Lord of the Rings: The Return of the King (2003), Batman Begins (2005), and Scott Pilgrim vs. the World (2010).

== Early life and education ==
Price's passion for music began early: a guitarist from the age of five, he went on to achieve a First Class degree in Music from Emmanuel College, Cambridge. Following graduation, he went to work in the London studio of Gang of Four guitarist/producer Andy Gill, for whom he would program, contribute string arrangements, and play on albums alongside artists such as Michael Hutchence and Bono.

== Career ==
Price went on to work as a programmer, arranger, and performer with film music composer Trevor Jones. He provided additional music for projects such as Roger Donaldson's Thirteen Days; Stephen Norrington's The League of Extraordinary Gentlemen; Frank Coraci's Around the World in 80 Days; the television series Dinotopia; and Tamra Davis' Crossroads, on which he was also the featured guitar soloist with the London Symphony Orchestra.

A recommendation from Abbey Road Studios brought him to the attention of Howard Shore, leading to Price's work with the composer as music editor on Peter Jackson The Lord of the Rings film trilogy. His subsequent films as music editor included Christopher Nolan's Batman Begins, for which he shared with his fellow music editors a Golden Reel Award nomination; and, in his first project with The World's End director Edgar Wright, Scott Pilgrim vs. the World, on which he also collaborated with the film's composer Nigel Godrich. Among the other composers that he has worked with and learned from are Hans Zimmer, James Newton Howard, Harry and Rupert Gregson-Williams, George Fenton, Dario Marianelli, and Anne Dudley.

He has composed music for advertising campaigns in both the U.K. and U.S. After contributing additional music to Richard Curtis' Pirate Radio, he composed the original score for Joe Cornish's sleeper success Attack the Block, winning awards from both the Austin Film Critics Association and the Sitges - Catalan International Film Festival.

In 2013, Price composed the score for Alfonso Cuarón's Gravity, for which he won the Academy Award for Best Original Score.

== Discography ==
=== Film ===
Year	Title	Director(s)	Studio(s)	Notes
2011	Attack the Block	Joe Cornish	Optimum Releasing	with Basement Jaxx
2013	The World's End	Edgar Wright	Focus Features	—N/a
2013	Gravity	Alfonso Cuarón	Warner Bros. Pictures	Academy Award for Best Original Score; BAFTA Award for Best Original Music; Critics' Choice Movie Award for Best Score; Nominated – Golden Globe Award for Best Original Score; Nominated – Grammy Award for Best Score Soundtrack for Visual Media
2013	Aningaaq	Jonás Cuarón	Warner Bros. Pictures	Short film
2014	Fury	David Ayer	Columbia Pictures	—N/a
2016	Suicide Squad	David Ayer	Warner Bros. Pictures; DC Films	—N/a
2017	Baby Driver	Edgar Wright	TriStar Pictures	—N/a
2017	American Assassin	Michael Cuesta	Lionsgate Films	—N/a
2018	Ophelia	Claire McCarthy	IFC Films	
2019	Wonder Park	Dylan Brown (uncredited)	Paramount Pictures; Nickelodeon Movies	Price's first score for an animated film.
2019	The Aeronauts	Tom Harper	Amazon Studios	—N/a
2020	Dolphin Reef	Alastair Fothergill; Keith Scholey	Disneynature	Documentary film
2020	Archive	Gavin Rothery	Vertical Entertainment	—N/a
2020	Over the Moon	Glen Keane	Netflix	Original score only; Original songs composed by Christopher Curtis, Marjorie Duffield and Helen Park
2020	David Attenborough: A Life On Our Planet	Alastair Fothergill; Keith Scholey; Jonathan Hughes	Netflix	Documentary film Primetime Emmy Award for Outstanding Music Composition for a Documentary Series or Special (Original Dramatic Score)
2021	Last Night in Soho	Edgar Wright	Focus Features	—N/a
2021	Sweet Girl	Brian Andrew Mendoza	Netflix	—N/a
2022	My Policeman	Michael Grandage	Amazon Studios	—N/a
2022	Beast	Baltasar Kormákur	Universal Pictures	—N/a
2022	The Swimmers	Sally El Hosaini	Netflix	—N/a
2023	Heart of Stone	Tom Harper	Netflix	—N/a
2024	Long Distance	Will Speck and Josh Gordon	TBA	—N/a
2024	William Tell	Nick Hamm	Eagle Pictures (Italy)	—N/a
2024	Joy	Ben Taylor	Netflix	—N/a
2024	Los Frikis	Tyler Nilson and Michael Schwartz	Wayward/Range	—N/a
2025	Heads of State	Ilya Naishuller	Amazon MGM Studios	—N/a
2025	Oh, Hi!	Sophie Brooks	Sony Pictures Classics	
2025	Ocean with David Attenborough	Colin Butfield, Toby Nowlan, and Keith Scholey	National Geographic	Documentary film Nominated – Primetime Emmy Award for Outstanding Music Composition for a Documentary/Nonfiction or Reality Program (Original Dramatic Score)
2025	The Running Man	Edgar Wright	Paramount Pictures	
2026	Coyote vs. Acme	Dave Green	Warner Bros. Pictures	Also score producer.

=== Television ===
Year	Title	Network	Notes
2004	The Mysterious Death of Cleopatra	—N/a	—N/a
2005	Angel of Death: The Beverly Allitt Story	BBC One	—N/a
2014	Believe	NBC	—N/a
2014	Poppies	CBeebies	BBC children's remembrance film
2015	The Hunt	BBC One	—N/a
2019	Our Planet	Netflix	—N/a

=== Music department ===
- Trojan Eddie (1996)
- The Proposition (1998)
- Doomwatch: Winter Angel (1999)
- Crossroads (2002)
- The Lord of the Rings: The Two Towers (2002)
- A Man Apart (2003)
- I'll Be There (2003)
- The League of Extraordinary Gentlemen (2003)
- The Lord of the Rings: The Return of the King (2003)
- Belly of the Beast (2003)
- Gladiatress (2004)
- Around the World in 80 Days (2004)
- Batman Begins (2005)
- Stoned (2005)
- Opal Dream (2006)
- Driving Lessons (2006)
- Perfect Creature (2006)
- After Thomas (2006)
- Mr. Bean's Holiday (2007)
- The Last Legion (2007)
- Earth (2007)
- I'm Not There (2007)
- Made of Honor (2008)
- Wild Child (2008)
- The Meerkats (2008)
- Frequently Asked Questions About Time Travel (2009)
- Pirate Radio (2009)
- Nanny McPhee Returns (2010)
- Scott Pilgrim vs. the World (2010)
- Paul (2011)
- Johnny English Reborn (2011)
- Marley (2012)
- Baby Driver (2017)

== Accolades ==
Award	Year	Category	Nominated work	Result	Ref.
Academy Awards	2013	Best Original Score	Gravity	Won	
Alliance of Women Film Journalists	2013	Best Music or Score	Gravity	Nominated	
British Academy Film Awards	2013	Best Original Music	Gravity	Won	
British Academy Television Craft Awards	2016	Best Original Television Music	The Hunt	Won	
Central Ohio Film Critics Association	2013	Best Score	Gravity	Runner-up	
Chicago Film Critics Association	2013	Best Original Score	Gravity	Nominated	
Critics' Choice Movie Awards	2013	Best Score	Gravity	Won	
Dallas–Fort Worth Film Critics Association	2013	Best Musical Score	Gravity	Won	
Denver Film Critics Society	2013	Best Original Score	Gravity	Won	
Golden Globe Awards	2013	Best Original Score	Gravity	Nominated	
Grammy Awards	2014	Best Score Soundtrack for Visual Media	Gravity: Original Motion Picture Soundtrack	Nominated	
Houston Film Critics Society	2013	Best Original Score	Gravity	Won	
Primetime Emmy Awards	2019	Outstanding Original Main Title Theme Music	Our Planet	Nominated	
Primetime Emmy Awards	2019	Outstanding Music Composition for a Documentary Series or Special (Original Dramatic Score)	Our Planet (Episode: "One Planet")	Nominated	
Primetime Emmy Awards	2021	Outstanding Music Composition for a Documentary Series or Special (Original Dramatic Score)	David Attenborough: A Life on Our Planet	Won	
Primetime Emmy Awards	2026	Outstanding Music Composition for a Documentary/Nonfiction or Reality Program (Original Dramatic Score)	Ocean with David Attenborough	Nominated	
San Diego Film Critics Society	2013	Best Score	Gravity	Nominated	
Satellite Awards	2013	Best Original Score	Gravity	Won	
St. Louis Film Critics Association	2013	Best Original Score	Gravity	Nominated	
Washington D.C. Area Film Critics Association	2013	Best Score	Gravity	Nominated	
