= A Perfect Planet =

2021 British documentary series

- Title card
- Genre: Earth science Nature documentary
- Narrated by: David Attenborough
- Country of origin: United Kingdom
- Original language: English
- No. of series: 1
- No. of episodes: 5

Production
- Executive producer: Alastair Fothergill
- Producer: Huw Cordey
- Production company: Silverback Films

Original release
- Network: BBC One
- Release: 3 January – 31 January 2021

A Perfect Planet is a 2021 five-part earth science series presented by David Attenborough. The first episode premiered on 3 January 2021 on BBC One. Filming took place over four years, across 31 countries, with crew navigating difficulties in extreme temperatures and remote locations. The editing process was affected by the COVID-19 pandemic. The series covers volcanoes, the sun, weather and oceans, with the final episode focusing on human impact on the environment. It received positive critical reception.

== Production ==
A nature documentarian with a lengthy career, David Attenborough is known for coverage of animal life. A Perfect Planet focuses on earth science topics and landscapes. In the context of the COVID-19 pandemic, Attenborough saw the series as well timed, saying: "This year perhaps more than ever, people are finding comfort and solace in the natural world". The series was produced by Silverback Films, with filming beginning in 2016 and spanning 31 countries. The crew numbered around 200 and 3,000 hours of footage were captured for the series.

By the time the pandemic affected the production, it was in the editing stage, much of which was done remotely. Unable to record in his usual studio in Bristol, Attenborough converted his dining room into a sound stage by hanging duvets from the walls. He used a microphone with a lead that went into his garden, where a sound recorder listened; a producer listened and gave feedback via Zoom. To withstand bad weather, they purchased a hut for the sound recorder. A string orchestra recorded music in Iceland, one of the few places such a gathering was possible, while woodwind and brass performers recorded their parts separately from their homes.

In the U.K., the series was broadcast on Sundays in the timeslot 8 p.m. on BBC One, beginning on 3 January 2021. In Canada, the series was broadcast at the same local time on BBC Earth. In the United States, the series was made available on the Discovery+ streaming service on 4 January 2021. In China, the series was broadcast on Mondays on CCTV-9 and online via Tencent Video, beginning on 4 January.

A Perfect Planet was announced in February 2019 alongside BBC commissioning of Frozen Planet II—a Frozen Planet sequel—and Planet Earth III—in the Planet Earth franchise. The series were initially scheduled for release in 2020, 2021 and 2022, respectively. Jim Waterson of The Guardian suggested that the BBC was aiming to maintain its staff with the commissioning, in the context of some BBC's Natural History Unit members leaving to join the online streaming service Netflix and Attenborough narrating their upcoming Our Planet.

=== Filming ===
The premiere "Volcano" features flamingo coverage at Lake Natron that Attenborough described as "one of the most memorable sequences [that he'd] seen on television". To get to Lake Natron, a hovercraft had to be shipped from the UK. Crew had to wear snowshoes on mudflats to avoid burns due to the heat. Series producer Huw Cordey found the "remoteness" of the Galapagos to be a challenge while filming there.

For "The Sun", episode two, producer Nick Shoolingin-Jordan and cameraperson Rolf Steinmann both experienced technical difficulties with extreme temperatures, Shoolingin-Jordan on Ellesmere Island and in a desert, and Steinmann in the Arctic. In the desert, fabrics soaked in water were required to cool down the camera to a temperature at which it could operate, while drone cameras in the Arctic had a limited operation time between being heated up with a hairdryer and freezing immobile while filming.

"Weather" depicts the Gobi Desert, which Attenborough has not visited. The crew searched to find a camel species numbering 450 in the desert and 1,000 in the world. He said: "I'm not likely to be sent there, because there aren't many animals, but there are fossils and I would love to go." The episode's producer, Ed Charles, reported that there was "literally no sound other than the whisper of the wind", describing it as a "very odd sensation". He said that several days often passed without "even a hint of another living animal". Camera operator Sophie Darlington said that not stepping on the Christmas Island red crabs seen in "Weather" was a difficulty, with crew having to rake the ground to clear the creatures away.

Charles said that the cuttlefish in "Oceans" began displaying more vibrant colours when they adjusted to the crew's presence. A wood frog in one episode freezes itself as an alternative to hibernation; to capture this action, crew filmed inside a freezer for 10 days.

The final episode, "Humans", was described by Attenborough as "the most important story of our times": it covers human impact on the environment. It shows the result of three weeks' filming on a Neptune's Navy ship. To board fishing boats, the crew would approach in small, fast boats from a distance; only boats which were fishing legally were successfully boarded. Assistant producer Emily Franke aimed to "show viewers the impact of our fishing practices".

== Episodes ==
List of episodes
No.	Title	Original release date	UK viewers (millions)
1	"Volcano"	3 January 2021	7.096
Volcanoes create habitats for many unusual animals. Lesser flamingoes fly in to breed in the dried up Lake Natron of nearby Ol Doinyo Lengai in Tanzania, while Marabou storks arrive to pick off newly hatched young. A Galápagos land iguana climbs into the crater of Fernandina Island in the Galapagos to lay eggs. Vampire ground finch steal blood from Nazca boobies. Aldabra giant tortoise seek shade during the hottest parts of the day. North American river otters in Yellowstone fish in rivers warmed by thermal springs. Kamchatka brown bears awaken from hibernation and hunt for salmon in Kurile Lake.
2	"The Sun"	10 January 2021	6.585
Earth's tilt makes light variable throughout the year. In the tropics, gibbons search for ripe figs, pollinated by the fig wasp. Arctic wolves try to hunt musk ox and Arctic hares. A wood frog awakens from a frozen hibernation. Garter snakes in Canada come out in springtime and compete for mates. An Arctic fox in Canada tries to steal eggs from nesting snow geese. In the Sahara desert, silver ants scavenge for food before overheating. In autumn, golden snub-nosed monkeys in China fight over food before the coming winter. Sooty shearwaters in New Zealand fly north to Alaska to avoid winter altogether, while humpback whales arrive at the same time.
3	"Weather"	17 January 2021	6.172
Varied rainfall across the planet shapes many habitats. In Zambia, straw-coloured fruit bats await fruit following October rains. Fire ants in the Amazon rainforest band together into a raft to float after their colony gets flooded. Giant river turtles lay their eggs on sandbars in the Amazon River. A Rain frog in South Africa searches for food at night. Bactrian camels in the Gobi Desert eat snow to rehydrate themselves. Christmas Island red crabs await monsoon rains for their migration to the coast to release their eggs. In the Zambezi River, red-billed quelea arrive to drink fresh water but must flee Nile crocodiles. Carmine bee-eaters build their nests in dry cliffs on the river bank but must dodge African fish eagles. Male hippopotamuses compete for territory during the dry season.
4	"Oceans"	24 January 2021	6.094
Moving tides and currents create opportunities but also challenges for many animals. Dolphins near South Africa hunt for mackerel, alongside gannets. Galapagos marine iguanas on Fernandina Island dive for kelp. In the Indo-Pacific, the male flamboyant cuttlefish tries to attract a mate. The Eider ducks in the Saltstraumen strait in Norway dive for mussels. Bottlenose dolphins hunt razorfish in the Bahamas. Female lemon sharks come to the mangrove forests to give birth. Manta rays in the Pacific gather at the spawning of surgeonfish to eat the eggs. Groups of trevally and blacktip reef sharks hunt hardyhead near Lizard Island by north-eastern Australia. Rockhopper penguins try to return to their nests. Eden's whales passively collect fish as fish stocks are diminishing.
5	"Humans"	31 January 2021	5.315
Human activity has affected most habitats on our planet. Various projects are shown, including the rescue of orphaned elephants in Kenya with the Sheldrick Wildlife Trust, stopping desertification with the Great Green Wall, animals being returned to the wild by IPAAM, reforestation projects in Brazil, designation of marine protected areas in Africa, turtle rescue by the New England Aquarium, renewable energy sources, and collection of animal samples in biobanks.

== Reception ==
A Perfect Planet was one of the most popular programmes on BBC iPlayer in the first week of 2021, which saw the highest viewing figures in the platform's history.

Rating the first episode five out of five stars, The Times' Carol Midgley found scenes "stunning" and "breathtaking", though filled with "torture and suffering". Anita Singh of The Telegraph gave the first episode four stars, praising the "quality of the photography" and Attenborough's narration as "spare and intelligent". Singh enjoyed the depiction of how the crew gathered footage and The Guardian's Euan Ferguson also highlighted this for praise. In another four-star review, The Independent's Sean O'Grady found the visuals "as awesome in scale and majesty as anything that has gone before" and lauded the series' theme as "clever and novel". Ibrahim Sawal, writing for New Scientist, praised it as a "great blend of natural history and earth science", praising the content about weather and climate change as "perhaps the series' most dramatic scenes".
