= Polar Bear (film) =

2022 American nature documentary film about polar bears

- Official release poster
- Directed by: Alastair Fothergill; Jeff Wilson
- Produced by: Alastair Fothergill; Keith Scholey; Roy Conli; Jeff Wilson; Jason Roberts
- Narrated by: Catherine Keener
- Cinematography: Ryan Atkinson; Howard Bourne; Per Christian Dyrø; James Ewen; Rolf Steinmann
- Edited by: Andy Netley
- Music by: Harry Gregson-Williams
- Production companies: Disneynature; Silverback Films
- Distributed by: Disney+
- Release date: April 22, 2022
- Running time: 84 minutes
- Country: United States
- Language: English

Polar Bear is a 2022 American nature documentary film about polar bears directed by Alastair Fothergill and Jeff Wilson. Narrated by Catherine Keener, it is the sixteenth nature documentary to be released under the Disneynature label. The film was released as a Disney+ exclusive on Earth Day April 22, 2022 and received positive reviews from critics.

== Plot ==
A mother polar bear and her cub swim across the waters that was once the ice of the Arctic Tundra, as the film tells us the story of how she and her family survived during her youth. She had loved playing with her twin brother as they were watched and protected by their mother, as she goes seal hunting and keeping a look out for male polar bears who threaten the cubs, they even came across a dead whale, and they, along with many other bears, feasted on it. Sadly one day, the polar bear's brother died, and it was only her and her mom left, she successfully hunted a baby walrus abandoned by a panicked mother. The bear's mother knew it's time to fend for herself again, and departs.

The polar bear then spent years not seeing another ice bear, until she meets another male her age and they spend a day playing together, as he bids farewell, she realizes she was being tracked by a much bigger male. Thinking he was going to kill her, she stands her ground, but soon realizes she was being courted. As the big male and the female go their separate ways, the polar bear soon becomes a mother of one cub. In the present day, the mother and daughter spend their days surviving in the disappearing Arctic, the mother knows her daughter will have what it takes to become a good ice bear, with a concerned question on what kind of world will she call home. The film ends with a message reading, "The Arctic could be ice-free by the summer of 2040, the actions we take today can positively change the future of polar bears."

== Production ==
Catherine Keener served as the narrator of Disneynature's documentary about polar bears. Alastair Fothergill and Jeff Wilson, the directing duo of Disneynature's previous film Penguins (2019), directed the film for producers Keith Scholey, Roy Conli, and Jason Roberts. Harry Gregson-Williams composed the film's score.

== Release ==
Polar Bear was released as a Disney+ exclusive on Earth Day April 22, 2022.

== Reception ==
=== Critical response ===
On the review aggregator website Rotten Tomatoes, 72% of 18 critics' reviews are positive, with an average rating of 5.8/10.

Claire Shaffer, of The New York Times, gave a positive review, saying "to its credit, Polar Bear isn't just playing in the snow; there's a very conscious through-line of conservation, highlighting how climate change has negatively affected the Arctic's ecosystem". John Serba of Decider found that the film provides an effective scientific warning on climate change and its consequences, while claiming that the film manages to highlight the beauty of the world. Robin Holabird of KUNR claimed that the documentary succeeds to highlight climate change and how its impact on the ice cap can be lethal to polar bears, praised the team that worked behind the documentary for being unobtrusive while filming, and found Catherine Keener to be a thoughtful and serene narrator. Jennifer Green of Common Sense Media rated the film 4 out of 5 stars, praised the film for its educational value, stating it focuses on the knowledge and skills of polar bears while highlighting the lethality of climate change, and found the film to contain positive messages and role models, claiming it depicts the challenges encountered when trying to survive in the Arctic wild.

=== Accolades ===
Year	Award	Category	Nominee(s)	Result	Ref.
2022	Wildscreen Panda Awards	Films at 59 Cinematography Award	Polar Bear	Won	
2023	International Film Music Critics Association	Best Original Score for a Documentary	Harry Gregson-Williams	Won	
