= North America (TV series) =

- Genre: Documentary; Nature
- Developed by: Silverback Films
- Narrated by: Tom Selleck
- Country of origin: United States
- Original language: English
- No. of seasons: 1
- No. of episodes: 7

Production
- Executive producers: Keith Scholey; Christine Weber; Iain Riddick
- Producers: Huw Cordey; Kristin Wilcox

Original release
- Network: Discovery Channel
- Release: May 19 – June 16, 2013

North America is a miniseries that aired on the Discovery Channel. It premiered on May 19, 2013. It ran for seven episodes, and ended on June 16, 2013.

The series includes the topics of nature and its beauty on the continent of North America.

The series is the first natural history landmark series on the Discovery Channel that is internally produced. The series has also been aired on Animal Planet.

== Cast ==
The series is narrated by Tom Selleck.

== Production ==
The footage in North America was taken from environments throughout the continent, mainly from Canada, the United States, and Central America. Filming took three years.

== Episodes ==
| No. | Title | Locations | Air date | Viewers (millions) |
|---|---|---|---|---|
| 1 | "Born to Be Wild" | Aleutian Islands; Great Basin Desert; Costa Rica; Labrador; Grand Tetons | May 19, 2013 | 3.44 |
| 2 | "No Place to Hide" | Canadian Prairies; The Great Plains; The Badlands; The Black Hills | May 19, 2013 | 3.44 |
| 3 | "Learn Young or Die" | Canadian Prairies; Grand Tetons; Kodiak Island; Saint Elias Mountains; Appalachian Mountains; Sierra Nevadas; Coast Mountains; Yellowstone National Park | May 26, 2013 | 1.98 |
| 4 | "The Savage Edge" | California Coast; The Everglades; Florida Coast; Mid-Atlantic Coast; Mississippi River | June 2, 2013 | 2.35 |
| 5 | "Outlaws and Skeletons" | Great Basin Desert; Death Valley; Sonoran Desert; Monument Valley; Grand Canyon; Gran Desierto de Altar | June 9, 2013 | 2.20 |
| 6 | "North America: Revealed" | Behind the Scenes | June 16, 2013 | 1.84 |
| 7 | "North America: Top 10" | Clip show | June 16, 2013 | 1.64 |

== Reception ==
=== Critical reception ===
North America received a 71 out of 100 from Metacritic, indicating generally positive reviews.

Robert Lloyd of the Los Angeles Times stated that the special effects were "corny" at times; however, he commended the filming, stating that the documentary was "gorgeous from first to last."

After viewing the first episode, Television Blend's Kelly West stated "North America dazzle[s] us with beautiful landscape views of different locations across the continent" and that it is "an educational experience as we witness North American wildlife in all its natural glory."

=== Ratings ===
North America premiered to a 1.0 rating in the Adults 18-49 demographic and 3.443 million overall viewers. It ended at about half of its premiere totals in both, with a 0.5 rating and 1.64 million viewers.

| Episode | Air date | Rating (18–49) | Viewers (millions) | Weekly Ranking (viewers) | Source |
|---|---|---|---|---|---|
| 1 & 2^{1} | May 19, 2013 | 1.0 | 3.44 | 16 | |
| 3 | May 26, 2013 | 0.6 | 1.98 | < 25 | |
| 4 | June 2, 2013 | 0.7 | 2.35 | < 25 | |
| 5 | June 9, 2013 | 0.6 | 2.20 | < 25 | |
| 6 | June 16, 2013 | 0.6 | 1.84 | < 25 | |
| 7 | June 16, 2013 | 0.5 | 1.64 | < 25 | |

^{1} – Separate ratings for episodes 1 and 2, which aired adjacent to each other, were not released.

== International distribution ==
In the United Kingdom, North America airs on the Discovery Channel. In the British version, the voice-over was re-dubbed and spoken by Chiwetel Ejiofor.

In Canada, the series airs on the Discovery Channel. In The Netherlands, the series airs on the Discovery Channel and is narrated by Rutger Hauer.

In Brazil, the series airs on the Discovery Channel and is narrated by Brazilian singer Seu Jorge.
