= David Attenborough: A Life on Our Planet =

2020 documentary film

- Film poster
- Directed by: Alastair Fothergill; Jonnie Hughes; Keith Scholey
- Narrated by: David Attenborough
- Music by: Steven Price
- Country of origin: United Kingdom
- Original language: English

Production
- Producers: Jonnie Hughes; Alastair Fothergill; Keith Scholey; Colin Butfield
- Cinematography: Gavin Thurston
- Editor: Martin Elsbury
- Running time: 83 min
- Production companies: Altitude Film Entertainment; Netflix; Silverback Films

Original release
- Network: Netflix
- Release: 28 September 2020

David Attenborough: A Life on Our Planet is a 2020 British documentary film narrated by David Attenborough and produced and directed by Jonnie Hughes. The film acts as a "witness statement", through which Attenborough shares first-hand his concern for the current state of the planet due to humanity's impact on nature and his hopes for the future. It was released on Netflix on 4 October 2020, along with a companion book A Life on Our Planet.

== Synopsis ==
From Pripyat, a deserted area after the nuclear disaster, Attenborough gives an overview of his life. Interspersed with footage of his career and of a wide variety of ecosystems, he narrates key moments in his career and indicators of how the planet has changed since he was born in 1926. As a child, Attenborough enjoyed studying fossils. His documentary career began in the 1950s when he began working for the BBC, a British public service broadcaster. He visited places such as the African Serengeti, in which native animals require vast areas of land to maintain grazing patterns. Over time, he noticed a decline in wildlife when searching for fish or orangutans in Borneo or other animals which he was looking for as part of his documentaries. Areas of the Arctic or Antarctic were different to what the filming crew expected due to ice caps melting. The causes are anthropogenic climate change and biodiversity loss pushing the planet towards a sixth mass extinction event over a period of centuries rather than the hundreds of millennia that built up to previous mass extinctions.

Attenborough describes the film as his "witness statement" and gives an impression of what could happen to the planet over the course of a lifetime beginning in 2020 and lasting as long as his own, were human activity to continue unchanged. The Amazon rainforest could degrade into a savanna; the Arctic could lose all ice during summer; coral reefs could die; soil overuse could cause food crises. These irreversible events would cause mass extinction and exacerbate climate change further.

However, Attenborough describes actions which could prevent these effects and combat climate change and biodiversity loss. He asserts that the solution has been "staring us in the face all along. To restore stability to our planet, we must restore its biodiversity. The very thing that we've removed." He proposes re-wilding; moreover, he says that bringing countries out of poverty, providing universal healthcare and improving girls' education would make the growing human population stabilise sooner and at a lower level. Renewable energy such as solar, wind, water and geothermal could sustainably power all human energy usage. Protecting a third of coastal areas from fishing could allow fish populations to thrive and the remaining area would be sufficient for human consumption. Humans changing their diet to eliminate or reduce meat in favour of plant-based foods could allow land to be used far more efficiently. Attenborough cites government intervention in Costa Rica causing deforestation to reverse, Palau's fishing regulations and improved use of land in the Netherlands as good examples.

== Production ==
Initially scheduled for cinematic release on 16 April 2020, the film was delayed due to the COVID-19 pandemic. The film premiered on 28 September 2020 in cinemas and debuted on the online streaming platform Netflix on 4 October. The day prior, a promotional video was released showing Attenborough answer questions from celebrities.

A companion book, A Life on Our Planet: My Witness Statement and a Vision for the Future, was released in October 2020.

== Reception ==
The film received positive critical reception. Patrick Cremona of Radio Times gave it five out of five stars, finding it "quite unlike" Attenborough's previous works and lauding its "blending" of a "terrifying condemnation" of humans' treatment of the natural world, and a "hopeful and inspirational manifesto" of how to address the climate crisis. Rating it four out of five stars, Ed Potton of The Times approved of the depiction of animals and Attenborough's "intimacy" and "authority" in his narration, but suggested that more of Attenborough's personal life could have been shown. Emma Clarke of the Evening Standard called the film "an essential watch". Natalia Winkelman of The New York Times praised the "astonishing nature photography" and juxtaposition between thriving and dying ecosystems.

=== Accolades ===
In 2021, the film was nominated for five Emmy Awards.

Awards and nominations received by A Life On Our Planet
Year	Ceremony	Category	Recipient(s)	Result	Ref.
2021	BAFTA Film Awards	Best Documentary	Alastair Fothergill, Jonnie Hughes & Keith Scholey	Nominated	
2021	Primetime Creative Arts Emmy Awards	Outstanding Cinematography for a Nonfiction Program	Gavin Thurston	Won	
2021	Primetime Creative Arts Emmy Awards	Outstanding Picture Editing for a Nonfiction Program	Charles Dyer and Martin Elsbury	Nominated	
2021	Primetime Creative Arts Emmy Awards	Outstanding Sound Editing for a Nonfiction or Reality Program (Single or Multi-Camera)	Paul Ackerman, Gareth Cousins, Kate Hopkins, Tom Mercer and Tim Owens	Nominated	
2021	Primetime Creative Arts Emmy Awards	Outstanding Sound Mixing for a Nonfiction or Reality Program (Single or Multi-Camera)	Graham Wild	Won	
2021	Primetime Creative Arts Emmy Awards	Outstanding Music Composition for a Documentary Series or Special (Original Dramatic Score)	Steven Price	Won	
2021	British Documentary Awards (Griersons)	Best Single Documentary	Jonnie Hughes, Alastair Fothergill, Keith Scholey & Colin Butfield	Won	
2021	British Documentary Awards (Griersons)	Best Natural History or Environmental Documentary	Jonnie Hughes, Alastair Fothergill, Keith Scholey & Colin Butfield	Nominated	
2021	PGA Awards	Outstanding Producer of Documentary Theatrical Motion Pictures	Jonnie Hughes	Nominated	
2021	Televisiual Bulldog Awards	Best Specialist Factual	Silverback Films & WWF	Won	
2021	Televisiual Bulldog Awards	Best in Show	Silverback Films & WWF	Won	
2021	ASCAP Filme and Television Music Awards	Documentary Score of the Year	Steven Price	Nominated	
2021	Cinema Audio Society USA	Outstanding Achievement in Sound Mixing for Motion Pictures - Documentary	Graham Wild, Gareth Cousins	Nominated	
2021	Pongo Environmental Awards	Environmental Award	Jonnie Hughes & Silverback Films	Won	
2021	International Film Music Critics Award (IFMCA)	Best Original Score for a Documentary	Steven Price	Won	
2021	Online Film & Television Association	Best Cinematography in a Variety, Sketch, Nonfiction, or Reality Program	David Attenborough A Life on Our Planet	Won	
2021	Online Film & Television Association	Best Sound Mixing in a Non-Serial Program	David Attenborough A Life on Our Planet	Nominated	
2021	Online Film & Television Association	Best Sound Editing in a Non-Serial Program	David Attenborough A Life on Our Planet	Nominated	
2021	Society of Composers and Lyricists Awards	Outstanding Original Score for an Independent Film	Steven Price	Nominated	
2020	Dublin Film Critics Circle Awards	Best Documentary	David Attenborough A Life on Our Planet	Won	
2020	Critics' Choice Documentary Awards	Best Narration	David Attenborough	Won	
