= Parenthood (2025 TV series) =

2025 British nature documentary television series

- Genre: Nature documentary
- Narrated by: David Attenborough
- Country of origin: United Kingdom
- Original language: English
- No. of episodes: 5

Production
- Executive producer: Keith Scholey
- Producer: Jeff Wilson
- Running time: 60 minutes
- Production company: Silverback Films

Original release
- Network: BBC One; BBC One HD
- Release: 3 August – 31 August 2025

Parenthood is a 2025 British nature documentary television series which shows how animals cope with the challenges of becoming parents and raising their young. The five-episode series was produced by Silverback Films and is narrated by David Attenborough. The production involved three years of filming across six continents and 23 countries. It was commissioned by the BBC and first shown in the UK on BBC One between 3 and 31 August 2025.

== Episodes ==
No.	Title	Produced by	Original release date	UK viewers (millions)
1	"The Greatest Adventure"	Jeff Wilson	3 August 2025	4.513
2	"Ocean"	Olly Scholey	10 August 2025	3.737
3	"Grasslands"	Elisabeth Oakham	17 August 2025	3.354
4	"Freshwater"	Elisabeth Oakham	24 August 2025	3.310
5	"Jungles"	Hugh Wilson	31 August 2025	3.516
