= Poppies (film) =

- Directed by: Simon Partington
- Music by: Steven Price
- Country of origin: United Kingdom

Production
- Producer: Jackie Edwards
- Running time: 2 minutes

Original release
- Network: CBBC; CBeebies
- Release: 9 November 2014

Poppies is a short hand-drawn animation which is broadcast on the BBC's children's channels, CBBC and CBeebies, to mark Remembrance Sunday and Armistice Day. The animation is broadcast at 11:00am and lasts the duration of the traditional two-minute silence. Poppies is also available on BBC iPlayer for over a year.

The film sees World War I as experienced by a group of animals living in a battlefield. As their peaceful wildflower meadow is interrupted by the outbreak of war, a rabbit, bird and snail take shelter underneath a Brodie helmet. At the end of the conflict, a single poppy blooms in the battlefield and is soon joined by hundreds more. The battlefield returns to meadow, and the rabbit and family gather together in peace.

The development of the film was instigated by a letter from a viewer to the BBC scheduling department which generated an internal discussion about how to mark Remembrance week in an age-appropriate way, while introducing the concepts of the poppy and what it symbolises. The Executive Producer of the animation, Jackie Edwards, noted:

War is a very tricky issue to cover for even the upper end of CBBC but an almost impossible thing to cover for the other end of CBeebies, so we were looking to emote the feelings of war rather than do a graphic visual depiction of war.

The animated animals were made using traditional hand-drawn techniques, with a watercolour tone palette used for backgrounds. Impressionistic shell bursts in the sky were created by overlaying the spread of Indian ink droplets in water. The director was Simon Partington and designer was Rachel Tudor Best at Flix Facilities.

The animation features a full orchestral score by Steven Price performed by the BBC Philharmonic Orchestra. The composer was involved from the beginning of the process, and the animation was created to fit his music.

The film was first broadcast on 9 November 2014 and has been broadcast every year since. It is also used by schools to introduce children to the subject of remembrance. The two minute duration was intentional, with the producer noting that the film's intention "is to engage even our youngest viewers to quietly focus for two minutes, while older viewers will be more aware of the context and deeper meaning of the film." It was nominated for a BAFTA for best Children's Short Form in 2015.
