= Life on Our Planet =

2023 American documentary series

- Promotional poster
- Narrated by: Morgan Freeman
- Composer: Lorne Balfe
- Country of origin: United States
- Original language: English
- No. of seasons: 1
- No. of episodes: 8

Production
- Executive producers: Steven Spielberg; Alastair Fothergill; Keith Scholey; Darryl Frank; Justin Falvey
- Producers: Dan Tapster; Alastair Fothergill; Keith Scholey
- Running time: 41–55 minutes
- Production companies: Amblin Television; Silverback Films

Original release
- Network: Netflix
- Release: October 25, 2023

Related
- The Dinosaurs

Life on Our Planet is an American television nature documentary miniseries released on Netflix and produced by Amblin Television and Silverback Films. Executive-produced by Steven Spielberg and narrated by Morgan Freeman, the series focuses on the evolutionary history of complex life on Earth. Upon its release, the series received generally mixed reviews, with praise for its visual effects, cinematography, soundtrack and scale, but criticism for its presentation, format, and script. In March 2026, its spiritual successor, The Dinosaurs, was released on Netflix.

== Development and release ==
Netflix first announced the series on November 1, 2022. Silverback Films and Amblin Television serve as the series' production companies. Steven Spielberg is listed as executive producer on the series. Morgan Freeman serves as the series' narrator.

A teaser for the series was released on YouTube by Netflix on August 22, 2023, while the official trailer was released on September 26. The series consists of eight episodes and was released on October 25, 2023. The series includes a hybrid of both computer-generated imagery (CGI) and live footage videography. A tie-in book written by Fletcher 2023 was published by Witness Books.

== Episodes ==
Each episode focuses on a specific few geologic periods, including the geologic and ecological changes that occurred during them (largely visualized with live-action footage as proxies, with some rendered imagery) and the prehistoric life that lived during those periods, which are visualized in photorealistic CGI akin to the Walking with... series and Prehistoric Planet. Each episode also features modern taxa that can trace their ancestry back to the geologic time periods shown, with several live-action segments akin to traditional nature documentaries, showing footage of some of the unique modern adaptations that some of these taxa have evolved.

No.	Title	Directed by	Original release date
1	"The Rules of Life"	Adam Chapman	October 25, 2023
Covers the origin of life and the rules of evolution, including natural selection, adaptation, interaction and speciation, in addition to an overview of the series. A pair of Smilodon brothers successfully take down a terror bird, (Note: Identified as Titanis in the companion book written by Fletcher 2023) a mother Maiasaura navigates the nesting grounds to reach her own nest, and a female Tyrannosaurus and her offspring unsuccessfully attempt to hunt a female Triceratops. In live-action segments, predatory marine vertebrates of different evolutionary origins attack a bait ball as a team, plants compete for space in a rainforest as an evolutionary arms race is shown between them and the caterpillars that feed on them, and many African species of birds and mammals congregate around a watering hole.
2	"The First Frontier"	Gisle Sverdrup	October 25, 2023
In the Precambrian seas, plankton develops and sets the stage for future organisms. Marine invertebrates slowly evolve and the prehistoric seas are ruled by jellyfish until the Cambrian explosion. In the shallow seas of the Cambrian era, an Anomalocaris attempts to hunt a trilobite, (Note: Identified as Olenoides in the companion book written by Fletcher 2023) but is foiled by the arthropod's hard exoskeleton. By the Ordovician, trilobite armor has become even more advanced to deal with new predators, but is no match for the beaks of cephalopods such as Cameroceras, while Arandaspis, an early vertebrate and fish, lives in the shadow of the invertebrates. The Late Ordovician mass extinction sees a massive global cooling that wipes out a majority of life on Earth, causing many invertebrates to retreat to the deep sea and leaving the vertebrates with a path to dominance. In the Devonian, a family of Dunkleosteus, one of the largest new vertebrates, hunts ammonoids (Note: Identified as Gonioclymenia in the companion book written by Fletcher 2023) using a vital new adaptation: jaws. Massive blooms of plankton cause global deoxygenation, leading to the second mass extinction event: the Late Devonian extinction. However, on land, plants come to dominate and transform the ecosystem, and animals soon follow. In live-action segments, a rainbow nudibranch preys on a sea anemone, larval jellyfish attempt to float over predatory sea anemones, a bobtail squid hunts a shrimp, male giant cuttlefish fight over mates, male sarcastic fringeheads fight over territory, and reef sharks hunt a school of fish as a team.
3	"Invaders of the Land"	Sophie Lanfear	October 25, 2023
The destabilization of rock by lichen creates the first soil, allowing plants to grow and eventually dominate. In the coal forests of the Carboniferous, a male Arthropleura follows the scent trail left by a female, and successfully performs his courtship with her. In the water, several young lobe-finned fish (Note: Identified as Strepsodus in the companion book written by Fletcher 2023) narrowly escape a hungry adult by moving onto land, but one is eaten by an early amphibian tetrapod, Anthracosaurus. As the Carboniferous gives way to the drier Permian, some of these amphibious tetrapods develop hard-shelled eggs that are more resistant to desiccation, becoming the first amniotes. The Permian is dominated by reptiles such as Scutosaurus and stem-mammals such as Lystrosaurus. A female gorgonopsid (Note: Identified as Inostrancevia in the companion book written by Fletcher 2023) successfully hunts down a Scutosaurus with her saber-like teeth. Massive volcanic eruptions in the Siberian Traps lead to great floods of lava, an atmosphere of noxious chemicals, and rapid global warming, prompting the Permian–Triassic extinction event, the largest mass extinction event in Earth's history, which wipes out almost all life. However, some species such as Lystrosaurus manage to survive. In live-action segments, a peacock spider dances for an unimpressed female, a tiger beetle hunts for prey while narrowly avoiding a trapdoor spider, marsh frogs jump out of the water to catch dragonflies, and a female strawberry poison dart frog carries her offspring to a bromeliad in the forest canopy.
4	"In Cold Blood"	Barny Revill	October 25, 2023
During the Early Triassic, in the aftermath of the recent extinction, surviving species recoup and Lystrosaurus quickly becomes the dominant animal on Earth, reaching an abundance unmatched by any other past or future animal. However, reptiles continue to evolve on the arid margins of Pangaea, and future Lystrosaurus populations find themselves at the mercy of predators such as erythrosuchids, like Erythrosuchus, who are one of the reasons for their extinction. Reptiles diversify and come to dominate both the land and the sea; in a flash-forward to the Jurassic, early sea turtles face predation from plesiosaurs, (Note: Identified as Pliosaurus in the companion book written by Fletcher 2023) and their hatchlings must avoid pterosaurs as they race to the water. Back in the Triassic, a massive precipitation event brings an end to the Pangaean desert, turning the world lush and green. In the Late Triassic, a Plateosaurus roams these forests, signaling the eventual future dominance of the dinosaurs. In live-action segments, Fabian's lizards in the Atacama Desert gain nourishment from brine flies and fight over the best feeding spots, a water anole uses a bubble as a diving bell to stay underwater, a Komodo dragon envenomates a water buffalo calf, green sea turtles congregate off Raine Island, and Nile crocodiles attack wildebeest.
5	"In the Shadow of Giants"	Barny Revill	October 25, 2023
Near the beginning of the Early Jurassic, heavy volcanic activity during the breakup of Pangaea leads to another mass extinction. However, the new environments facilitate and supercharge the evolution of the survivors, including the dinosaurs. By the Late Jurassic, and throughout the Cretaceous, large dinosaurs of all kinds have evolved. An Allosaurus unsuccessfully hunts for Diplodocus hatchlings during a rainstorm at night. Flowering plants evolve and revolutionize life on Earth, as numerous lineages of insects adapt to pollinate them while other lineages evolve to feed on these pollinators, and by the Cretaceous, there are more species on the land than in the ocean for the first time. During the Early Cretaceous, the evolution of feathers benefits theropod dinosaurs, such as Deinonychus, which hunt in packs, and one of which manages to take down an Arkansaurus. Tectonic changes in the Late Cretaceous create shallow seas that increasingly isolate landmasses from one another. Ornithischian dinosaurs, such as hadrosaurs, like Maiasaura, develop jaws with the ability to chew the newly-evolving plants and the ability to travel in massive herds. Meanwhile, early mammals also take advantage of the diversifying plants and evolve complex behavior as well. A male Tyrannosaurus successfully courts a female. In live-action segments, a giant water lily blooms and is pollinated by a Cyclocephala beetle, pollinators face different predators, Megaponera ants raid a termite mound and use antibiotic saliva to heal each others' wounds, a mother numbat rescues her offspring from a snake, and a sidewinder rattlesnake unsuccessfully attempts to hunt kangaroo rats.
6	"Out of the Ashes"	Nick Shoolingin-Jordan	October 25, 2023
On the last day of the Cretaceous, Edmontosaurus, Triceratops, Tyrannosaurus, Alamosaurus, azhdarchid pterosaurs and a plesiosaur go about their daily lives just before an asteroid the size of Mount Everest crashes into Earth, causing the Cretaceous-Paleogene extinction event. Megatsunamis, burning ejecta from the impact, an overheated atmosphere, and acid rain wipe out a majority of life on Earth, bringing to an end the reign of non-avian dinosaurs and destabilizing the marine food web. Abyssal scavengers and insects survive by feeding on the dead organisms. Some small species of reptiles, amphibians, fish, birds and mammals manage to survive the impact from below the ground and via eggs laid in the ground. These survivors are said to follow in the dinosaurs' footsteps to take their places in taking over the world. A flashback to the Jurassic shows the origins of flight as a female Anchiornis uses her gliding abilities to evade a juvenile Sinraptor. Despite the impact winter, the adaptations of conifers to the cold allow them to dominate the northern latitudes shortly after impact. Meanwhile, flowering plants come to dominate the tropics, forming tropical rainforests, the most biodiverse ecosystem on Earth. By the Neogene, the plains of South America are dominated by the giant terror birds, (Note: Identified as Phorusrhacos in the companion book written by Fletcher 2023) which hunt mammals, such as Theosodon. As Australia moves north, coral reefs dominate the Arafura Sea, serving as centers of diversification for marine life. Seabirds spread across the planet to take advantage of the wealth of prey. Despite the success of birds, it's the mammals that dominate the Cenozoic, as shown by a Smilodon killing a terror bird. In live-action segments, Andean flamingoes conduct courtship in the Altiplano, a great grey owl hunts a vole in a conifer forest, hummingbirds, such as the swordbill, use their specialized adaptations to feed on nectar and compete for the best flowers, a flock of gannets feeds on a school of fish, Galapagos penguins use their wings to "fly" underwater and hunt fish while marine iguanas feed on kelp.
7	"Inheriting the Earth"	Adam Chapman	October 25, 2023
In a flashback to the Jurassic, early mammals (Note: Represented by a sugar glider.) live in the shadow of the dinosaurs, both day and night. Following the K-Pg mass extinction, they quickly rebound and diversify, and follow in the dinosaurs' footsteps in taking their places to dominate the planet. However, in the middle of the Paleogene, the separation of Antarctica and South America drives a global cooling and drying event, leading to new adaptations in mammals such as large sizes. A male Megacerops, one of these new giant mammals, unsuccessfully spars with a rival male over a female. The drying trend from Antarctica's separation continues and leads to the replacement of forests with grasslands over a fifth of Earth's area, leading to the extinction of many mammals. Surviving grazing mammals evolve specialized adaptations to process grass. In early Quaternary South America, a curious young Smilodon investigates a herd of Doedicurus and attempts to prey on a juvenile, but is warded off by their tails. The Himalayas are shown as an example of major geologic changes during the Cenozoic. Mammals conquer both the sky and the sea; in a flashback to the Paleogene, a Maiacetus, a semiaquatic early whale ancestor, evades the giant shark Otodus. As the planet cooled, the descendants of Maiacetus would evolve into the largest animals ever known: the whales. The cooling intensifies, plunging the planet into an ice age and leading to the dominance of a new type of mammal. In live-action segments, a family of coatis search for food; capuchin monkeys open clams by hammering them on tree trunks, use their tails to absorb water, and use citronella as an insect repellent; a cheetah unsuccessfully attempts to hunt a wildebeest calf; a female snow leopard raises her cubs while her mate's attempt to hunt an ibex ends fatally; fruit bats are hunted by martial eagles; and male humpback whales compete over a female.
8	"Age of Ice and Fire"	Sophie Lanfear	October 25, 2023
Near the beginning of the Quaternary, changes in Earth's orbit, currents, and atmosphere lead to the ice age. By the middle of the Quaternary, the tundra-steppe circles the northern latitudes south of the ice sheets. On their migration through the steppe, a herd of woolly mammoths is ambushed by a pride of cave lions, who successfully take down a subadult individual member. A drying trend leads to the expansion of deserts south of the tundra-steppe, and the rainforests of Africa are almost entirely replaced with savanna. At the end of the glaciation, the ice sheets melt as the Earth's orbit shifts again and the climate warms. In North America, massive proglacial lakes form from the melting, and one such melting event leads to immense floods that carve a path across North America, but rapidly recede. The climate stabilizes and the world greens over in the current epoch, allowing for a recovery of forests and wetlands. Many megafauna worldwide are mysteriously driven to extinction, which allows bison to dominate the Great Plains, where they are killed en masse in buffalo jumps by early human hunters, who had previously contributed to the megafaunal extinctions. Humans develop agriculture and give up the hunter-gatherer lifestyle, leading to the formation of complex society and civilization, and eventually technology. Humanity's dominance threatens the balance of Earth through habitat destruction and climate change, leading to the potential for a sixth mass extinction, which can only be halted through a concerted effort from humanity. However, Freeman notes that no matter what future awaits the Earth, "life has always found a way", (Note: Possibly a reference to Spielberg's other work, Jurassic Park.) as a dragonfly metamorphoses and flies through a lush, post-apocalyptic London. In live-action segments, bison in the Yellowstone winter ward off wolves, two troops of baboons fight over fruit, a whiskered tern in the Danube Delta unsuccessfully attempts to court a female, and humanity comes to dominate the globe.

== Reception ==
The review aggregator website Rotten Tomatoes reported a 50% approval rating with an average rating of 4.7/10, based on 6 reviews. On Metacritic, the series has a weighted average score of 55 out of 100, based on 5 reviews, indicating "mixed or average".

Jack Seale of The Guardian praised the series' cinematography and visual effects with some exceptions, noting that "footage of animals that are real (...) and sequences conjured from scratch on a computer are nearly indistinguishable". However, criticism was given for the script and Freeman's narration, which he described as hyperbolic and treating "billions of animals in the same broad biological grouping as if they were an army or a sports team enjoying success together", ultimately describing the series as "empty spectacle". Biologists Tim Rock and Matthew Wills of The Conversation gave a more positive review, praising the series for its ambition and referring to it as "hugely entertaining", although it was accused of occasionally adopting adaptationism for its narrative.

The series was nominated for International Green Film Award at the Cinema for Peace awards in 2024.

== See also ==
- Our Planet
- Our Universe

== Bibliography ==
- Fletcher, T. (2023), Life on Our Planet: Accompanies the Landmark Netflix Series, Witness Books, pp. 1–312, ISBN 9781529144147
