= Keith Scholey =

British producer and television executive

Keith Scholey is a British producer of nature documentaries for television and cinema, and a former television executive. He is currently a joint director of Silverback Films Ltd and Studio Silverback Ltd.

He has been an executive producer on the Netflix shows Life on Our Planet and Our Planet II, as well as a series producer of the Netflix series Our Planet an executive producer of BBC series A Perfect Planet, The Mating Game, The Earthshot Prize: Repairing Our Planet, and a director of the Netflix film David Attenborough: A Life on Our Planet. He also co-directed African Cats, Bears, and Dolphin Reef with Alastair Fothergill for Disneynature, and is also the executive producer of the series North America for the Discovery Channel.

== Early life and education ==
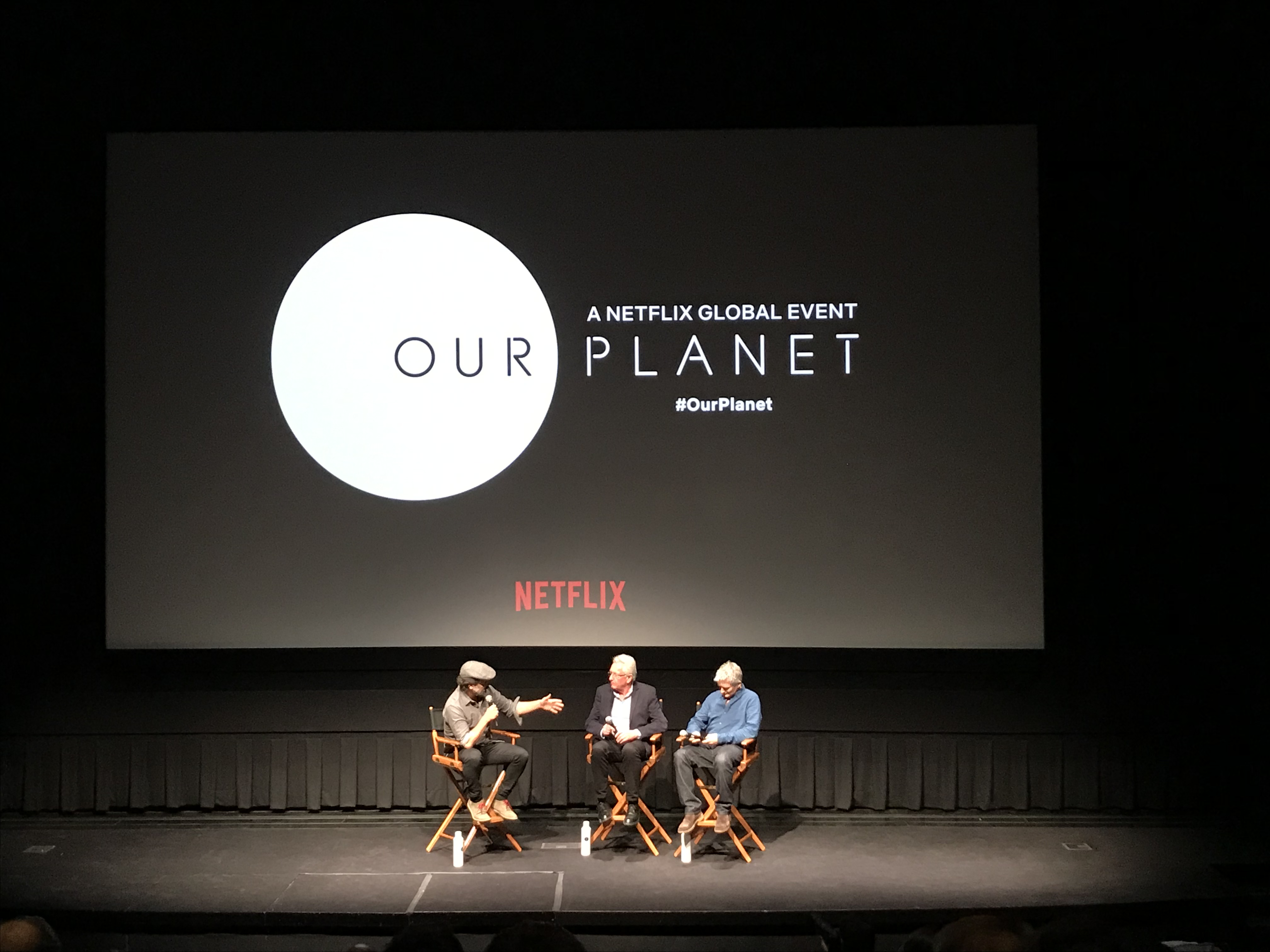
Keith Scholey discussing Our Planet at the TIFF Bell Lightbox.

Keith Scholey graduated from Bristol University with a degree in zoology in 1978, and subsequently completed a PhD in zoology at the same university.

== Career ==
In 1983, Scholey began working as a researcher at the BBC Natural History Unit on the David Attenborough series The Living Planet. He rose to become a producer in this BBC department, making programmes for The Natural World and Wildlife on One series as well as for Attenborough's award-winning series The Private Life of Plants. He also created and produced the original series of Big Cat Diary, which has continued for over a decade, began and series produced the Wildlife Specials and became the series editor of Wildlife on One.

In 1998, Scholey became the head of the Natural History Unit. During his four-and-a-half-year tenure, the NHU made the David Attenborough series State of the Planet and The Life of Mammals, and also The Blue Planet, Andes to Amazon and Wild Africa. The department also reinvented its live broadcasting, creating The Abyss - Live and Springwatch.

In 2002, Scholey became the controller of specialist factual for the BBC's Factual and Learning division. With responsibility for Science, Arts, Business, History, Religion as well as Natural History departments, he oversaw programmes with a range from landmark programming including, Auschwitz, Planet Earth, Egypt, Supervolcano and The Power of Art to the classic long-running series of Horizon, Timewatch, Natural World, and arena and live events including the funeral of Pope John Paul II.

In 2006, Scholey became the controller of Factual Production for BBC Vision, with responsibility for all BBC Factual in-house production. During this time, he oversaw the creation of The One Show, the biggest factual commission in the organisation's history. He was also the deputy chief creative officer for BBC Vision Productions, with responsibilities across all in-house TV production. In 2008, he resigned from the BBC to pursue a career as an independent film director and television producer.

Scholey went on to co-direct African Cats (2011), Bears (2014), and Dolphin Reef (2020) with Alastair Fothergill for Disneynature and was the executive producer on the Discovery Channel series North America (2013) and Deadly Islands.

In 2012, Scholey co-founded Silverback Films, an independent Bristol-based natural history film production company, with Alastair Fothergill. He has worked as an Executive Producer on the Netflix shows Life on Our Planet (2023) and Our Planet II (2023), as well as a Series Producer of the landmark Netflix series Our Planet (2019), an Executive Producer of BBC series A Perfect Planet (2021), The Mating Game (2021), The Earthshot Prize: Repairing Our Planet (2021), and a Director of the Netflix film David Attenborough: A Life on Our Planet (2020).

He is currently a joint Director of Silverback Films Ltd and Studio Silverback Ltd.

== Recognition and awards ==
In 2001 Scholey was made honorary Doctor of Science (DSc) by the University of Bristol for his contribution to the public and to biological sciences.

== Filmography ==
=== Directing and producing ===
- African Cats (2011)
- Bears (2014)
- Dolphin Reef (2020)
- David Attenborough: A Life on Our Planet (2020)
- Sea Lions of the Galapagos (2025)
- Ocean with David Attenborough (2025)

=== Executive producer ===
- Life on Our Planet (2023)
- Our Planet II (2023)
- The Earthshot Prize: Repairing Our Planet (2021)
- Breaking Boundaries: The Science of Our Planet (2021)
- A Perfect Planet (2021)
- The Mating Game (2021)
- North America (2013)

=== Producer ===
- Polar Bear (2022)
- Breaking Boundaries (2021)
- Penguins (2019)
- Big Cat Diary (1996)
- Natural Neighbours: Invasion of the Tree Smashers (1996)
- Dawn to Dusk: Elephant Back Safari (1996)
- Wildlife on One: Reef Encounter (1996)
- The Private Life of Plants (1995)
- Wildlife on One: Malice in Wonderland (1994)
- Natural World: Island of the Ghost Bear (1994)
- Prisoners of the Sun (1992)
- Natural World: Running for their Lives (1990)
- Wildlife on One: Haunted Huntress (1990)
- Natural World: Island in the Air (1989)
- The Great Rift (1988)

=== Series Editor ===
- Wildlife on One (1994 to 1997)
- Wildlife Specials (1997)
- Nature Specials (1997)
