= Bears (film) =

2014 American nature documentary film

- Theatrical release poster
- Directed by: Alastair Fothergill; Keith Scholey
- Written by: Alastair Fothergill; Adam Chapman
- Produced by: Keith Scholey
- Narrated by: John C. Reilly
- Music by: George Fenton
- Production companies: Disneynature; Silverback Films
- Distributed by: Walt Disney Studios Motion Pictures
- Release date: April 18, 2014 (United States)
- Running time: 77 minutes
- Country: United States
- Language: English
- Budget: $5 million
- Box office: $21.3 million

Bears is a 2014 American nature documentary film about a family of brown bears living in the coastal mountain ranges of Alaska. Directed by Alastair Fothergill and Keith Scholey and narrated by John C. Reilly, Bears was released theatrically by Disneynature on April 18, 2014, the seventh nature documentary released under that label. It generally received positive reviews from critics.

== Plot ==
In Katmai National Park and Preserve in Alaska, an Alaskan brown bear mother named Sky gives birth to two cubs named Scout and Amber in her den on a mountain slope. When April comes, the bears are ready to leave the den. As the bears leave, the oncoming summer brings with it a threat of avalanches. The bears are able to avoid the disasters. Upon reaching the lush valley below, the cubs meet the other bears, some of which pose a threat to the cubs; among these bears are Magnus, a big healthy male who dominates the valley, and his rival Chinook, an older male. The family works together to survive the spring, with Sky keeping the cubs safe from Tikaani, a pesky lone wolf. The cubs get to know how to defend themselves in encounters with Tikaani. The family also stays clear of the frequent dominance fights between Magnus and Chinook.

As the spring wears on, the cubs learn about how to catch food. Sky leads the cubs to the mudflats to dig up clams hiding under the mud. The family has a good time until the tide turns. In the chaos, Scout gets stranded on a sandbar. Unable to do much, Sky can only look on as the cub tries to free himself. He finally comes to his senses and swims over to Sky. The family heads back to higher ground, where, after another encounter with Magnus, Chinook attacks again. As Sky fights off Chinook, Amber and Scout hide in a nearby log. After Chinook is driven away, Amber reappears from the log, but Scout is nowhere to be seen. Sky looks for him all day, but to no avail. Eventually, just as Sky and Amber are about to give up searching, Scout comes right back out of the log he had been hiding in the whole time.

When summer comes, so does the yearly salmon run. Dozens of bears gather along salmon streams on the coast & the rivers, especially the Great Falls, where only adult males are allowed, to get the best of the run before it ends. This also leads in an increase in dominance fights between Magnus and Chinook. Sky, meanwhile, is looking for a different place to find food, the Golden Pond, where bears can make the best of the salmon run peacefully. After feasting on washed up mussels and rock eels in a hidden sanctuary, and the cubs having their first taste of salmon while going up river towards, a raven leads Sky and her two cubs to the direction of the Golden Pond just in time to save the brown bear family from their starvation. She and her cubs leave Katmai and head north to Lake Clark National Park and Preserve, where the Golden Pond awaits, filled with salmon. After the family fill themselves on the riches of the feast, they head back to Katmai as winter approaches. When the first snow arrives, all the bears head back up the mountains to their dens to sleep out the harsh cold winter. The cubs have learned a lot from their first year which will greatly help them for the rest of their lives.

== Production ==
The central brown bear family was filmed at Katmai National Park and Preserve in Alaska. Fothergill and Scholey previously directed African Cats together.

=== Music ===
Olivia Holt sang her song "Carry On" for the film. The song "Home" by Phillip Phillips appeared in the trailer and in the film.

== Release ==
Bears was released in the United States on April 18, 2014, four days before Earth Day.

=== Home media ===
Bears was released on Blu-ray and DVD combo pack on August 12, 2014.

== Reception ==
=== Critical response ===
Rotten Tomatoes gave the film a score of 90% based on reviews from 60 critics, with an average score of 7.10/10, with the critical consensus listed as saying: "Sweet, beautifully filmed, and admirably short on sugarcoating, Bears continues Disneynature's winning streak". On Metacritic, which assigns a rating out of 100 based on reviews from critics, the film has a score of 68 based on 20 reviews, indicating "generally favorable" reviews.

=== Accolades ===
Year	Award	Category	Recipient(s)	Result	Ref.
2014	Golden Trailer Awards	Best Documentary TV Spot	Walt Disney Studios Motion Pictures, Disneynature, Toy Box Entertainment	Nominated	
2014	International Film Music Critics Association Awards	Best Original Score for a Documentary Film	George Fenton	Nominated	
