= Roy Conli =

American film producer and voice actor

- Born: August 15, 1971 (age 54)
- Education: Cal Poly Pomona (BA); Boston University (MFA)
- Occupations: Film director; film producer; animator
- Years active: 1996–present
- Relatives: Nathan Kress (first cousin once removed)

Roy Salvatore Conli (born August 15, 1971) is an American film producer and voice actor who won the Academy Award for Best Animated Feature for Big Hero 6 at the 87th Academy Awards.

== Early life ==
Born Roy Salvatore Conli (true surname Coniglione of Italian descent), he graduated from Cal Poly Pomona in 1983 with a major in drama and received an MFA in directing from Boston University in 1987.

== Filmography ==
=== Feature films ===
Year	Film	Credited as		
Year	Film	Producer	Other	Notes
1996	The Hunchback of Notre Dame	Co-producer	No	
2002	Treasure Planet	Yes	No	
2010	Tangled	Yes	Yes	Additional voices
2014	Big Hero 6	Yes	Yes	Additional voices
2016	Born in China	Yes	No	
2017	Olaf's Frozen Adventure	Yes	No	Featurette
2019	Penguins	Yes	No	
2022	Polar Bear	Yes	No	
2022	Strange World	Yes	No	
2024	Tiger	Yes	No	
2025	Sea Lions of the Galapagos	Yes	No	
2026	Orangutan	Yes	No	
2026	Hexed	Yes	No	

=== Television ===
Year	Production	Credited as		
Year	Production	Producer	Executive producer	Notes
2022	Baymax!	Yes (Note: Episodes 1-3 only)	Yes (Note: Episodes 4-6 only)	Disney+ original series
