= African Cats =

2011 American documentary film

- Theatrical release poster
- Directed by: Keith Scholey; Alastair Fothergill
- Produced by: Alix Tidmarsh; Keith Scholey
- Narrated by: Samuel L. Jackson (US version); Patrick Stewart (UK version)
- Music by: Nicholas Hooper
- Production companies: Disneynature; Fothergill/Scholey Productions; Silverback Films
- Distributed by: Walt Disney Studios Motion Pictures
- Release dates: April 22, 2011 (United States); February 1, 2012 (France); April 27, 2012 (United Kingdom)
- Running time: 89 minutes
- Countries: United States; France; United Kingdom
- Languages: English; French
- Budget: $5 million
- Box office: $30.9 million

African Cats (known as Felines in France) is a 2011 nature documentary film about a pride of lions and a family of cheetahs trying to survive in the African savannah directed by Alastair Fothergill and Keith Scholey. The film was released theatrically by Disneynature on Earth Day, April 22, 2011. The film is narrated by Samuel L. Jackson (Patrick Stewart in the UK release). A portion of the proceeds for the film were donated to the African Wildlife Foundation and their effort to preserve Kenya's Amboseli Wildlife Corridor. The film's initiative with the African Wildlife Foundation is named "See African Cats, Save the Savanna", and as of May 2011, ticket sales translated into 50,000 acres of land saved in Kenya.

== Plot ==
In the southern plains of the Maasai Mara National Reserve in Kenya, lives Mara, a six-month-old lion cub, with her mother Layla, who both belong to the River pride, led by Fang, an old male lion, named after his remaining fang after he gets a distinctive broken tooth because of an earlier fight. In the northern plains of the Maasai Mara, lives Sita, a cheetah who has just given birth to five cubs to take care of. Sita and her cubs coexist with another lion pride led by a large male named Kali, who wishes to expand his pride and territory by taking over Fang's own with the help of his four sons, which however he cannot reach as both sides are divided by a crocodile infested river.

One day, Sita's cubs are playing while Kali and the largest of his sons are on patrol. Sita, seeing them as a serious danger to her cubs, goads both lions, so as to lure them away, but after the confrontation, the cubs have scattered. Sita desperately calls for them. As it gets darker, hyenas are seen and heard. In the morning, three of her five cubs return to Sita. Although she continues to call for the other two cubs, it's clear that they have been killed by hyenas. Meanwhile, Layla is injured by a zebra's kick while hunting. As the wildebeest begin to migrate to greener pastures, so does the River pride, but due to her injury and old age, Layla has trouble keeping up. Mara stays alongside her mother and tries to help on her way. Soon, they begin to lose track of the pride. Knowing that Mara needs her family for her survival, Layla forces through her injury, and they soon find themselves within the River pride once more.

As time passes in the northern side, Sita's cubs thrive, and begin to show more of their cheetah nature. One day, a gang of three adult cheetah brothers roaming about zone in on Sita. Again, Sita finds herself having to divert attention from rivals so that they do not find her cubs. However, being fellow cheetahs, they do not tire as easily as lions do; and soon, the brothers separate Sita from her cubs. As they circle them, the cubs stand their ground and hiss at the bullies, meaning they have inherited their mother's prowess and bravery. Before the cheetah brothers can do anything, a passing elephant chases them away – meaning that in the savanna, even bullies get bullied.

Some time later, the river has lessened. Kali and his largest son take advantage of it so they can cross and begin their assault on the River pride. They head towards the southern territory. Fang, upon seeing them approaching, runs for his life, but Layla does not back away – knowing that Mara and the other cubs could be killed should the assault succeed, she fearlessly attacks the rivals. Soon, the other lionesses, inspired by Layla's courage, join in the fight. Kali and his son are defeated and leave the area, though they remain on the southern side of the river. Victory completed, Fang returns, and life returns to normal for the pride as well. Layla has been injured ever further during the fight. Seeing that she might not make it, on a rainy day – which the lions take advantage of to bond with each other – for Mara's sake, she goes to her sister Malayka – who has cubs of her own – and reconnects with her so as to maintain a spot in the pride for Mara. Once she sees that Mara is accepted by Malayka, Layla slips away from the pride to find a quiet place to die. Meanwhile, hyenas approach Sita and her cubs, but the brave mother cheetah, having already lost two cubs to them, does not back away; sure enough, she attacks them fearlessly, not letting them anywhere near her cubs. Finally, the hyenas give up the fight and leave – Sita's bravery has kept the remaining cubs alive and free from danger.

As time goes by, Kali and his largest son reunite with the other three sons. Together, they return to the River pride for another assault. Upon seeing them, Fang runs away for the second time, never to be seen or heard from again – if he is to ever return, he would be shown no mercy. Kali takes over the pride and exiles Fang's cubs, including Mara – now a young adult. Her male cousins are seen as the number one threat to Kali and his sons, so they hunt them down. Seeing that they can no longer stay within their pride, the young males have no choice but to cross the river, even though its level has grown and it is infested with crocodiles, nonetheless, they reach land unscathed. The lionesses initially refuse to admit Kali as their leader, the wound of losing their cubs still far too fresh in their minds. Mara tries to live on her own and fend for herself, but she was banished before she was taught to hunt, and finds her first attempts at catching meals on her own, even small warthogs and especially big rhinos and buffaloes, humiliatingly unsuccessful and learns that there are benefits in belonging to a pride. Meanwhile, Sita & her cubs follow the gazelle herds to the River Pride's domain, where they settle down while getting into a feud with the River Pride.

Soon the wildebeest return, and the lionesses begin to hunt for their new cubs – Kali's offspring, having made peace with him and his sons. Mara successfully hunts and feasts. Soon after, she proves herself to the pride, and is at last welcomed back – Layla's sacrifice for raising her cub was not in vain. Meanwhile, Sita's cubs are now young adults, and they're thriving. They hone their hunting skills, they practice on a serval and a jackal, and even get to cross the river. Afterwards, they encounter hyenas then Kali's pride, and learn to stand up to hyenas like a true brave cheetah does, and to avoid and outrun lions instead of hunting them. Finally, they successfully hunt an antelope for food. Sita, seeing that her cubs are now ready to forge their own path, leaves them and returns to the solitary life of a cheetah. The narrator shows that Mara and Sita's cubs are the finest examples of a mother's love.

During the credits, it is shown that Sita's cubs went their separate ways & she has become one of the most successful cheetah mothers to roam the plains. Mara has been accepted by her pride and is now ready for motherhood herself, Kali still reigns supreme on both sides of the river, and the filmmakers are still looking for Fang.

== Production ==
The families of the animals in African Cats were filmed on the Maasai Mara National Reserve, a major game region in southwestern Kenya. The Maasai Mara is one of the few remaining places in Africa where lions, cheetahs and leopards live in large numbers and in close proximity. To help achieve scientific accuracy, the directors recruited Dr. Sarah Durant of the Zoological Society of London. Durant worked in Tanzania for the last 19 years, studying cheetahs and working toward the conservation of all of Africa's large carnivores. The film is narrated by Samuel L. Jackson.

== Release ==
The film was released on April 22, 2011, and as of April 12, over $1.7 million in tickets were sold in advance of the film's release. As of May 2011, ticket sales translated into 50,000 acres of land saved in Kenya. The film was released in France on February 1, 2012, under the title Felines (French: Félins). The film was released on April 27 of the same year in the United Kingdom with narration by Patrick Stewart. The premiere was attended by several important guests of honour, including Prince William and Catherine, Duchess of Cambridge and Lucy Rosen.

=== Home media ===
The film was released as a Blu-ray/DVD combo pack and film download on October 4, 2011 (the same day as The Lion King Diamond Edition Blu-ray/DVD combo pack). The DVD version of the release includes the "Disney & Nature" and "Save the Savanna" bonus features, while the Blu-ray version additionally includes the music video for "The World I Knew" by Jordin Sparks and a behind-the-scenes extra called "Filmmaker Annotations". The film download version includes the two bonus features from the DVD, plus three segments from the "Filmmaker Annotation" Blu-ray extra. Disneynature donated a portion of the home media proceeds in October 2011 to the African Wildlife Foundation's "Save the Savanna" initiative.

== Music ==
"The World I Knew"

Promotional single by Jordin Sparks
- Released: April 12, 2011
- Recorded: 2011
- Genre: Pop
- Length: 4:47
- Label: Walt Disney
- Songwriters: Ryan Tedder, Josiah Dean
- Producer: Ryan Tedder

"The World I Knew" is a song performed by American recording artist Jordin Sparks, and serves as the theme song of African Cats. The song was written by Ryan Tedder and Inflo who also produced the song. It was released by Walt Disney Records as a digital download on April 12, 2011, on iTunes and amazon.com. The film also features music by composer Nicholas Hooper; Hooper's soundtrack to the film was chosen as one of the 97 Original Scores eligible for a nomination at the 84th Academy Awards in 2011.

=== Background ===
Jordin describes the song as being about "everybody having a path they have to take but when you have that one person next to you or a few friends, if you have your family with you pretty much you can face another day, you can get through any obstacle and you can make it through anything".

=== Music video ===
The song's music video was shot in Burbank, California. The video places Jordin in a surreal world of sparkling butterflies and magic waterfalls, as she sings about eternal love. Viewers also get to see footage from the film, including scenes involving lion and cheetah cubs. The video premiered on Disney Channel on April 2, 2011, during The Suite Life Movie and played at the end credits of the film.

== Reception ==
=== Box office ===
The film earned $3.3 million on its opening day, which was just short of Earth's $4.1 million start and was the third-highest grossing opening day for a documentary film. However, Friday accounted for 55% of its opening weekend, as it set the record for the highest Friday percentage share for a film, and grossed just over $6 million for its opening weekend, ranking in sixth place with a per-theater average of $4,921 from 1,220 theaters. The opening was the same as Disneynature's previous film, Oceans. The film's worldwide gross was $30,857,747.

=== Critical response ===
Rotten Tomatoes gave the film a score of 73% based on reviews from 79 critics, with an average rating of 6.30/10. The website's consensus reads: "It isn't quite as majestic as its subjects, but African Cats boasts enough astounding footage -- and a big enough heart -- to keep things entertaining". Metacritic, which uses a weighted average, assigned the film a score of 61 out of 100, based on 20 critics, indicating "generally favorable" reviews.

=== Accolades ===
Year	Award	Category	Nominee(s)	Result	Ref.
2011	Environmental Media Awards	Documentary	African Cats	Nominated	
2011	Phoenix Film Critics Society Awards	Best Documentary	African Cats	Nominated	
2012	Central Ohio Film Critics Association	Best Documentary	African Cats	Nominated	

== See also ==
- Mikumi National Park
- The Last Lions
