= Witness statement =

Signed document recording evidence given

Witness statement on Omar Khadr

A witness statement is a signed document recording the evidence of a witness. A definition used in England and Wales is "a written statement signed by a person which contains the evidence which that person would be allowed to give orally".

The United States Federal Rules of Criminal Procedure defines a witness statement as: "(1) a written statement that the witness makes and signs, or otherwise adopts or approves; (2) a substantially verbatim, contemporaneously recorded recital of the witness's oral statement that is contained in any recording or any transcription of a recording; or (3) the witness's statement to a grand jury, however taken or recorded, or a transcription of such a statement."

== See also ==
- Evidence
