= Our Planet =

Nature documentary

- Opening sequence for Our Planet
- Genre: Nature documentary
- Narrated by: David Attenborough (English); Salma Hayek (Latin American Spanish); Penélope Cruz (European Spanish); Jorge Helal (Portuguese); Jaques Frantz (French, season 1); Hervé Jolly (French, season 2); Dario Penne (Italian, season 1); Luigi La Monica (Italian, season 2); Christian Bruckner (German)
- Composers: Steven Price (s. 1); Jasha Klebe (s. 2); Thomas Farnon (s. 2)
- Country of origin: United Kingdom
- Original language: English
- No. of seasons: 2
- No. of episodes: 12 + 1 behind-the-scenes special (1 hour)

Production
- Executive producers: Alastair Fothergill; Keith Scholey; Colin Butfield
- Running time: 48–53 minutes
- Production companies: Silverback Films; World Wide Fund for Nature

Original release
- Network: Netflix
- Release: 5 April 2019 – 14 June 2023

Our Planet is a British nature documentary series made for Netflix. The series is narrated by David Attenborough and produced by Silverback Films, led by Alastair Fothergill and Keith Scholey, who also created BBC documentary series Planet Earth, Frozen Planet and The Blue Planet, in collaboration with the conservation charity World Wildlife Fund (WWF). The soundtrack was composed by Steven Price.

The series focuses on the wildlife and natural wonders of eight different ecosystems, and has been noted for its greater focus on humans' impact on the environment than traditional nature documentaries, centering around how climate change impacts all living creatures. It is the first nature documentary Netflix has ever made. All episodes were released on 5 April 2019. A behind-the-scenes documentary was released onto Netflix on 2 August 2019. Netflix reported that 25 million households were expected to watch the series during its first month of release. It was later reported that 100 million households had watched the series as of March 2021.

A second season, Our Planet II, was released on June 14, 2023.

== Production ==
On 15 April 2015, it was announced that the team behind the BBC nature series Planet Earth would produce an eight-part nature docu-series for Netflix that would be released in 2019. It was nine and a half years in the making and was filmed in 50 countries, and over 600 crew members took part in the production. The series focuses on the breadth of the diversity of habitats around the world, including the Arctic wilderness, the deep sea, the vast landscapes of Africa and the diverse jungles of South America.

In November 2018, David Attenborough was announced as the narrator, with the release date of 5 April 2019 also announced.

== Promotion ==
The series premiere was held on 4 April 2019, at the Natural History Museum in London. Guests at the premiere included Prince Charles and his two sons Prince William and Prince Harry, Charlie Brooker, David Beckham and his son Brooklyn Beckham, Ellie Goulding and the series narrator David Attenborough, who attended the event to underline their support for action against climate change.

In his speech, Prince Charles said he hoped “Our Planet” would educate hundreds of millions of people around the world about what action was required, while David Attenborough called on the world to "be responsible careful citizens of this planet which is our only home, and for the creatures that live in it."

The first teaser trailer for Our Planet was released on 8 November 2018. Three months later, on 4 February 2019, the second teaser trailer was released. On 19 March 2019, the official trailer for the documentary was released.

== Episodes ==
=== Series overview ===
Series	Title	Episodes	Originally released
1	Our Planet	8	5 April 2019
2	Our Planet II	4	14 June 2023

=== Season 1 (2019) ===
[This] series will explore the Earth's most important habitats, and celebrate the life they still support. We will reveal what must be preserved if we are to ensure a future where humans and nature can thrive.

— David Attenborough, "One Planet"

No. overall	No. in season	Title	Produced by	Original release date
1	1	"One Planet"	Adam Chapman	5 April 2019
Off the coast of Peru, millions of guanay cormorants and Peruvian boobies carpet bomb a bait ball of anchovies. A vast school of mackerels are hunting krill, who are then themselves hunted by common dolphins and shearwaters. Flocks of lesser flamingos arrive at Lake Natron, Tanzania after a deluge to nest, but as the water dries, the flamingo chicks have to embark on a journey to find water. At the Serengeti, a pack of hunting dogs pursue a blue wildebeest calf. An orchid attracts a male orchid bee in search of a mate and attaches its pollinium onto the bee's back, providing the bee with fragrances to attract a mate. Golden-collared manakins, red-capped manakins, and blue manakins have different types of courtship display. A herd of caribou retreat into a forest to take shelter from the harsh winter weather, but are hunted by a pack of wolves. Attenborough then warns of the rapid melting of sea ice in the Arctic and Antarctica, showing the impact it has on polar bears. In Greenland, a glacier collapses, creating a large tidal wave.
2	2	"Frozen Worlds"	Sophie Lanfear	5 April 2019
Gentoo penguins climb to the top of a rocky outcrop to lay their eggs. Beneath the melting sea ice, trillions of Antarctic krill graze upon algae. The penguins and several humpback whales gather in large groups to feed on the abundant krill. A pod of orcas arrive and hunt the penguins. On the island of South Georgia, wandering albatrosses raise their chicks. Leopard seals stay the winter in the warmer waters of South Georgia to hunt king penguins out to find food for their chicks. Two male southern elephant seals fight over dominance. Far north in Svalbard, the impact climate change has on polar bear's hunting habits is shown, as ringed seals use dens less often, removing the bears' advantage of ambush. During summertime in the Canadian Arctic, narwhals wait for a crack in the ice to hide from predators in a shallow bay. Over a hundred thousand walruses have hauled out on a beach in the Russian Far East due to much of the sea ice having melted. Some of the walruses manage to scale the high cliffs, but many fall to their deaths.
3	3	"Jungles"	Huw Cordey	5 April 2019
In the Congolian rainforests, a troop of lowland gorillas and African forest elephants travel to Mbeli Bai, a wet clearing in the middle of the jungle to feed. Different species of birds-of-paradise use different methods to attract mates. On the forest floors of Borneo, a velvet worm squirts a glue-like slime to capture a cockroach. The symbiotic relationship between various species of pitcher plants with mountain treeshrews, ants and Hardwicke's woolly bats is explored. A mated couple of Philippine eagles raise a chick in the declining Philippines rainforest. Some Peruvian spider monkeys visit a salt lick down on the forest floor. Leafcutter ants ensure that their gardens are disease-free with the help of bacteria, however, one of the ants succumbs to a fungal infection that takes over its whole body. The episode ends in the rainforest of Sumatra, where mother Sumatran orangutans teach their young important life skills of survival.
4	4	"Coastal Seas"	Hugh Pearson	5 April 2019
Several giant trevallies and mobula rays work together to feast on a shoal of anchovies. At the Everglades National Park, bottlenose dolphins herd mullet in a ring of mud. Grey reef sharks have a cleaning symbiosis with cleaner wrasses and at nighttime, they and whitetip reef sharks work together to hunt within a coral reef. Corals have a mutualistic relationship with algae, which help provide them with food, but because of rising sea temperatures, coral begin to lose algae, endangering the world's coral reefs. Sea otters and California sheephead help control the population of sea urchins in the Californian kelp forests. Steller sea lions and humpback whales congregate to feast on breeding shoals of Pacific herring. Due to overfishing and unsustainable fishing methods, Pacific herrings have been declining. The increasing temperatures have allowed compass jellyfish to skyrocket in numbers. Millions of seabirds roost off the coast of Chile. Although sharks were once extirpated from the Raja Ampat Islands, the surrounding seas were protected and it was turned into a shark nursery, restoring balance to the ecosystem.
5	5	"From Deserts to Grasslands"	Adam Chapman	5 April 2019
Opening on the dry Atacama Desert where there are parts that have never recorded rainfall. However, the Arabian Desert provides refuge for Socotra cormorants. Over the Dhofar Mountains in Oman, a male and female Arabian leopard mate. At the Rub' al Khali sand dunes, only desert specialists like the Arabian oryx are capable of survival. A herd of desert elephants are led by their matriarch to an oasis. A coalition of five male cheetahs take down a wildebeest. During the summer, male American bison fight over mating rights. Butterflies are abundant in farmlands in Hungary and the caterpillars of the Alcon blue rely on ants to carry them to their nests, where they will be fed by nurse ants. Once abundant throughout the Eurasian Steppe, saiga antelope are now critically endangered, but conservation efforts have been protecting them for years. Conservation efforts and captive breeding have also helped save another grassland animal, the Przewalski's horse. In the grasslands of India, a Bengal tiger stalks deer from the tall grass. Despite poaching and the growing population in India, the tiger population has been on the rise.
6	6	"The High Seas"	Hugh Pearson	5 April 2019
A large pod of dolphins manage to escape from a pack of false killer whales with their superior speed. The Gulf of California provides a safe haven for female blue whales and their calves. Off the coast of Costa Rica, yellowfin tuna shadow a pod of spinner dolphins as they hunt lanternfish. Despite their tiny size, phytoplankton play an invaluable role in the ocean's food web and cloud formation. Deep into the twilight zone, several unique creatures like the giant oarfish and deep-sea anglerfish have unique adaptations to survive in a world of darkness. Deep water coral like Lophelia are home to smaller organisms like bristle worms, however, a lot of deep sea reefs have been destroyed by deep sea fishing nets. In the Southern Ocean, giant petrels, black-browed albatrosses and Wilson's storm petrels find a dead sea lion and are all scared off by the arrival of a wandering albatross. Hundreds of Pacific bluefin tuna pursue a bait ball of anchovies. Because of a combination of overfishing and plastic pollution, several fish species are now in peril. Squid numbers have been increasing, affecting the diets of some species. The episode concludes with a super-group of humpback whales aggregating off the coast of South Africa.
7	7	"Fresh Water"	Mandi Stark	5 April 2019
After the Lake Eyre dries up, several young Australian pelicans have to fly back to the coast. In the Andes, torrent ducks feed on scarce insect larvae. Salmon migrate from the ocean into the inland rivers to breed and Alaskan brown bears await their arrival. The Caño Cristales in Colombia has flourishing populations of the colourful Macarenia plant. The warm Floridan rivers provide a winter refuge for manatees. Millions of mayflies emerge from the Tisza to mate before their deaths in three hours. In the Pantanal floodplains, a jaguar hunts a caiman. Male callipterus cichlids collect shells to attract females. The Siamese fighting fish is well adapted to living in oxygen-poor water. During a drought in Tanzania, several hippos are crammed in a muddy pool. African buffalos struggle to find water but African elephants are able to dig for water in the sand with their trunks. The Platte River, once a hotspot for sandhill cranes has now been dammed, although conservationists have been working to manage the river's flow to restore the cranes.
8	8	"Forests"	Jeff Wilson	5 April 2019
Deep in the forests of Siberia, some wild boar who are searching for pine cones in the forest floor are stalked by a Siberian tiger. Multiple bald eagles gather for a salmon run. Male rough-skinned newts tussle over mating with a female. As the summer ends, a forest fire occurs, but even after the destruction, flowers and tree seedlings sprout out from the soil. In the Western Ghats of India, lion-tailed macaques and great hornbills help with seed dispersal. The Miombo woodland in Central Africa not only serves as a hunting ground for hunting dogs and food for a large number of elephants, but a large swarm of mopane worms hatch in the woodland and quickly strip the trees bare. On the island of Madagascar, a pair of fossas mate and leaf bugs searching for tree sap help a gray mouse lemur find sugar. The planet's forests are known for their resilience, including Chornobyl. Despite the amounts of radiation after the Chernobyl disaster, plants began to germinate after a decade and today, it still sustains a thriving population of animals including roe deer, Przewalski's horses and wolves.

=== Season 2 - Our Planet II (2023) ===
No. overall	No. in season	Title	Produced by	Directed by	Original release date
9	1	"Chapter 1: World on the Move"	Toby Nowlan; Huw Cordey (series producer)	Toby Nowlan	14 June 2023
All life on Earth depends on the freedom to move. During the dry season on the Okavango delta, a pride of lions take advantage of the wondering herds of African buffalo, targeting a lone male who strayed away from the herd. Locusts take advantage of growing vegetation, eating as much as they can before changing form and growing wings to travel further and eat more vegetation, travelling from Africa, crossing the Red Sea and reaching Tibet. Night fall on British Columbia, and Ancient murrelet chicks race to the sea to reunite with their parents, who they'll follow out to sea in order to feed. In Laysan, a Laysan albatross chick waits for its parent to return with food along neighbouring Black-footed albatross chicks, but their meals could be their last, as the adults sometimes feed them plastic without knowing. On the warming Arctic Ocean, a young polar bear struggles to hunt seals with the ice disappearing, forcing it to try and ambush its prey in the water. Female walrus need the ice as well to rest after feeding, but with fewer places to do so, it makes the life of a new mother a challenge. During June, on the Bering Sea, Humpback whales and Sooty shearwaters come to feed on the now rich sea, while on Laysan, Tiger sharks begin to congregate to take advantage of the albatross chicks' first flight attempts. With the Laysan albatross chick now grown up and ready to fly seeing others fall to a gruesome end, will it manage to take off and escape or suffer the same fate?
10	2	"Chapter 2: Following the Sun"	Ed Charles; Huw Cordey (series producer)	Ed Charles	14 June 2023
The Earth's surface isn't even, and the Sun's energy triggers countless journeys as the seasons go. Following the previous events of the first episode, the young Laysan albatross takes flight and splash lands into the sea, barely escaping the attack of a tiger shark before managing to take to the skies. On a meadow in July, a Honey bee colony sends scouts to find a new home to settle the colony. With the Arctic tundra now ice free, snow geese arrive to breed, laying only a single clutch of eggs each as soon as they arrive, and protecting it from Arctic foxes eager to snatch a free meal. Once the chicks hatch, the parents guide them into the nearest bodies of water as caribou move through their breeding grounds, attracting grizzly bears who follow them. In the Serengeti, hundreds of thousands of Wildebeest move through on the largest terrestrial migration on Earth, marching through territories of lions who hunt them. August on Vancouver Island, hundreds of tadpoles exploit the sun's energy to feed on the warm shallows while avoiding predators like dragonfly larvae and leeches. Eventually, through the summer of the days, the tadpoles grow legs and move onto land, where their march into the forest is threatened by garter snakes, but their attacks are minimal to their numbers. America's pacific northwest's rivers are now filled with water, the perfect stage for sockeye salmon to migrate upstream to breed, their journey taking them just beyond Iliamna lake. Many are intercepted by bears and Harbour seals, but the vast majority reaches their spawning grounds where they lay their eggs and die. Continuous daylight in the Arctic has melted most of the sea ice, making the life of a mother polar bear and her two cubs a hard one. The family arrives on a small, rocky shore to find food, but one of the cubs struggles to keep up, and when it does, the food the mother has found is already eaten, and the family moves on. In the Persian Gulf, whale sharks, the world's biggest fish, are attracted by the spawning of fish, like tuna, near the Al shaheen oil field. Back in the Serengeti, wildebeest and zebra prepare to cross the Mara River, where Nile crocodiles are waiting for the crossing. With a zebra and its foal about to cross the river, will the young zebra reach the other side safely?
11	3	"Chapter 3: The Next Generation"	Toby Nowlan; Huw Cordey (series producer)	Toby Nowlan	14 June 2023
To provide the young the best start, some animals make astonishing journeys. The zebra foal from the previous episode crosses the Mara River, sticking close to its mother and safely crossing to the other side. On the pacific coast of Mexico, hatchlings of olive ridley sea turtle make a dash to the sea as soon as they emerge from the sand, avoiding opportunistic predators who take advantage of this sudden emergence of food, and when they grow into adults, they come back to the same beach they hatched in their hundreds. Late October on the Falkland Islands, and young elephant seals begin to practice swimming in rocky pools, but a pod of orca, led by an experienced female, swim into these pools to catch unwary pups. In New Zealand, Fiordland penguin pairs breed under the protection of the forest, though their nesting ground locations mean they must trek over boulders, roots, ravines, and any other obstacle the jungle puts in their way; once the chick is grown up, the penguins leave for the sea, making a journey away from the rich waters of New Zealand half way to Antarctica, making it a "quite pointless migration". The monsoon rains arrive on Christmas Island, triggering the breeding season for the Christmas Island red crab. Their route may have been altered by human activity, but people have provided the crabs paths to cross and reach the shore to spawn. In some years, and with luck, the hatching crabs return to shore and make the journey back to land, crossing the same path their parents made while avoiding yellow crazy ant colonies as well as... their own parents. Late November, and in Patagonia, a family of puma separates. The male cub of the family makes a journey to find a territory of his own while trying to hunt guanaco for himself. In the Himalayas, demoiselle crane flocks travel south to India, crossing the challenging peaks where Golden eagles ambush them. In March 2020, the worst drought to hit the tropical forests of Yunnan in China forced a family of Asian elephants to leave their forest homelands and travel into a new, threatening world; their travel was witnessed by the world, the struggle of an animal family trying to find a place to live in the largest populated country in the world.
12	4	"Chapter 4: Freedom to Roam"	Ed Charles; Huw Cordey (series producer)	Ed Charles	14 June 2023
When animals are faced with dramatic change, the urge to move away can be overwhelming—the elephant family from the previous episode reached the city of Kunming, where the city elements proved too frightening for the family and forced them to make the journey back home; however, people helped the family on their journey back, and they soon reached their forest home, where the drought had ceased. It is now January in the Antarctic Peninsula, gentoo penguins begin to breed on the now exposed bare rock. As the chicks grow, they demand more food, but the parents not only provide, but also encourage their chick to chase them for it, testing their endurance. Eventually, as autumn returns, the chicks are ready to plunge into the sea, but leopard seals make the new swimmers hesitant; despite the challenge, however, they must feed out at sea. In the rush, one chick is separated and chased by a seal, it is now a one-on-one. February, and while the northern end of the planet is still in darkness, snow geese make their journey up north across North America, the land below them having changed since their ancestors flew, from an endless savannah to industrial farmland. The new normal, however, has its benefits and problems: on one hand, the farmlands provide more fuel for the birds, on the other, having become so numerous, they are sought after by hunters, with a quarter of a million being shot every year. And it is not just human hunters who challenge their journey, when conditions worsen and the geese are forced to stop, bald eagles attack and kill the injured ones from the panicking flocks. On the north, a Canadian lynx travels through the northern forests in search of a meal. Few prey remain around, with only creatures like snowshoe hares being around and not easy to catch. By March, herds of pronghorn begin their annual migration to their birth grounds in the Rocky Mountains, but like with the geese, their migration route has changed. Most of their natural predators have been driven away while fences and roads cause new problems for the nomads. Army ants in the Amazon rainforest move the location of their bivouac at night for safety, and in Mexico's Baja peninsula, a mother gray whale gives birth to a healthy calf, but with no food for the mother to consume and turn into milk for the calf, the two start a migration north. Keeping close to the coast, the family is met with dangers like industrial ships disorienting and striking them, but it is in Monterey Bay where the biggest challenge for the pair is faced and failed; a pod of orca ambush the family and kill the calf, leaving the mother to finish the journey on her own.

=== Specials ===
A 1 hour long bonus episode "Our Planet - Behind The Scenes" about the project is accessible under Additional Videos on Netflix.

== Reception ==
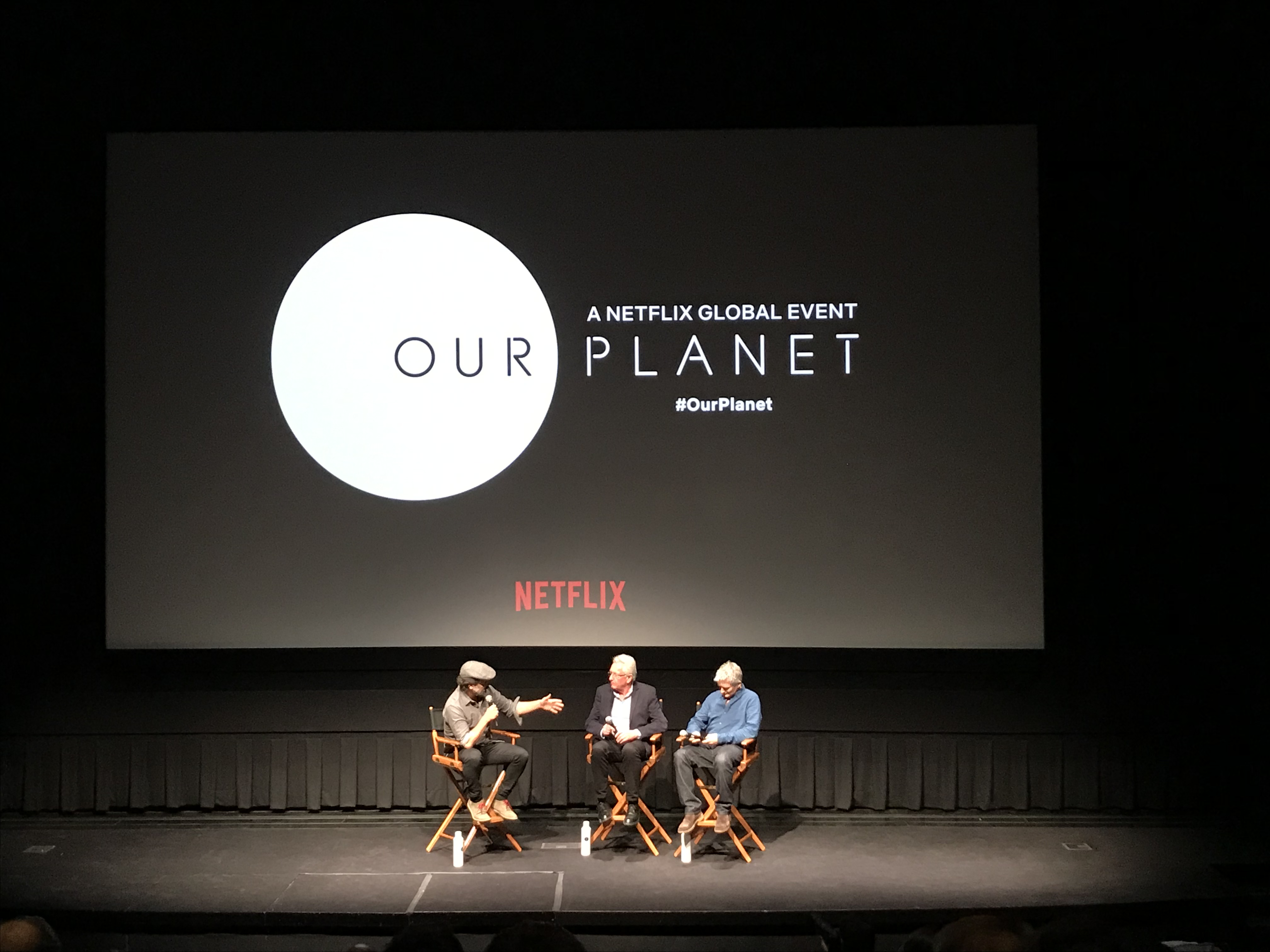
Keith Scholey discussing Our Planet at the TIFF Bell Lightbox.

The review aggregator website Rotten Tomatoes reported an approval rating of 93% based on 27 reviews, and an average rating of 8.33/10. The website's critical consensus reads, "A cornucopia of visual wonder and environmental advocacy, Our Planet's breathtaking cinematography explores more of this beautiful, blue marble while presenting an urgent call to action to its inhabitants" Metacritic, which uses a weighted average, assigned the film a score of 88 out of 100, based on 7 critics, indicating "universal acclaim".

Lucy Mangan of The Guardian gave out 4 out of 5 stars to Our Planet, saying "it places clearer emphasis on the fragility and interconnectedness of all the species and eco-systems on display, and on the huge impact, humanity has had on them in so short a time. Bryan Resnick of Vox praised the series as "can't really describe the scale of what's missing" stating "It reminds us we’re living in an age of staggering wildlife loss due to human development, over-fishing, deforestation, and climate change. This series doesn't let us forget that. Humans have caused staggering amounts of wildlife loss. Our Planet doesn't hide from it." Ben Travers of Indie Wire gave out an overall B+ for the series, and claims that the series ruthlessly contrasts the world's natural wonders with the environmental crisis killing them off, he wrote "Their deaths are a warning for the darkness underlying all of Our Planet, a nature docuseries no longer content with passive commentary. It also offers all the stunning imagery you've come to expect from these documentarians, but its attitude may surprise you. Individual entries feel a little less memorable because of it. The light, comic touches that made for lovely little moments in Planet Earth are overshadowed if not spoiled entirely, by the traumatic lessons put front and centre."

Will Gompertz of BBC also handed out a 4 out of 5 stars for the series, stating it "gives us some of the most dazzling images you are ever likely to view on TV. When necessary, they are embellished with Attenborough's commentary, which is never obtrusive and always written with brevity and wit...It has been created by masters of their craft with an exceptional narrator, I do wonder, though, if the experienced executive producers at BBC would have sharpened up the first episode a little." Stuart McGurk of British GQ said "It's hard not to see this as a direct rebuke of the BBC's nature documentaries: take one well-worn spectacular of the natural world, shoot it even more spectacularly than the BBC ever did and structure your whole opening episode around the idea that, without taking things like global warming seriously – without putting it front and centre about any show you're making about the natural world, because how could you not – then pretty soon they'll be nothing left to film so beautifully." Kevin Yeoman of Screen Rant concluded the series as "stunningly ambitious", he wrote "Where Our Planet excels [Planet Earth and Blue Planet], though, is in its presentation. It's not trying to convince anyone of anything — the time for doing that is long past. It's simply stating this information as fact, in as straightforward a manner as possible. Not that it's particularly difficult considering the evidence the series has on hand."

However, Ed Power of The Telegraph criticized the documentary series as "visually dazzling but very familiar." and gave it a 3 out of 5 stars, writing "It is clichéd in its portrayal of life on earth as a slow-motion ballet of tooth and claw....In short, the innovations that made Attenborough's previous series so sensational are conspicuously absent. It's a haunting vision. More of this and Our Planet might have been a meaningful addition to the canon of natural history series. Instead, it prioritizes cinematic grandeur to an almost oppressive degree." Writing in The Independent, Lucy Jones stated that the most important aspect of the series, which set it apart from other nature documentaries of its type, was the depictions of the harsh realities of global warming, mass species extinction and environmental degradation which were woven into the narration that accompanied the breathtaking scenes and imagery, but she also argues it did not go far enough and should have been more radical given current ecological crises. In particular, she says the program should have called out those responsible for this ecocide. When Attenborough's narration tells the audience "We have destroyed half the forests on earth", she retorts "But, who is we? As well as the fossil fuel industry, where is the fishing industry? Agriculture? The plastics industry? The vested interests that keep the planet burning? Yes, we are all complicit – those of us in affluent societies with high-consumption lifestyles more so than anyone – but there are greater powers at work. Describing the scale of the challenge is necessary but I wanted the series to go further, to peer under the hood."

== Controversy ==
Netflix cut together footage of walrus from two different haul out sites in Russia, both filmed in 2017. Producer Sophie Lanfear clarified that "the sequence includes footage from two separate beaches." The producers consider the cut walrus segment "the most powerful story they found during four years of filming."

Parents of children in Canada and other Netflix viewers complained about certain graphic scenes.

== Soundtrack ==
Our Planet

Soundtrack album by Steven Price
- Released: 5 April 2019 (Digital)
- Genres: Soundtrack, Classical music
- Length: 2:26:00
- Labels: Decca Records, Universal Music
- Producer: Netflix

The soundtrack was released with a compilation of the incidental music specially commissioned for Our Planet. The theme song "In This Together", which is a collaboration with English singer and songwriter Ellie Goulding, is also included.

No.	Title	Episode Title	Length
1.	"This Is Our Planet"	"One Planet"	3:43
2.	"The Numbers Build"	"High Seas"	5:04
3.	"They Work as a Team"	"Frozen Worlds"	3:41
4.	"The Importance of This River"	"Freshwater"	2:40
5.	"An Ingenious Technique"	"Coastal Seas"	2:49
6.	"The Ocean Returns the Favour"	"Deserts and Grasslands"	2:20
7.	"Baby Blue"	"High Seas"	4:51
8.	"Regeneration"	"Forests"	1:51
9.	"An Unknown Signal"	"One Planet"	5:08
10.	"Too Big to Argue With"	"Jungles"	5:35
11.	"Frozen Worlds"	"Frozen Worlds"	3:26
12.	"Mayflies"	"Freshwater"	3:08
13.	"Great Rolling Waves"	"Coastal Seas"	6:36
14.	"Crucial to Their Survival"	"Jungles"	7:25
15.	"Every Year There Are Others"	"Forests"	2:48
16.	"Where Life Gathers"	"One Planet"	3:20
17.	"The Perfect Gift"	"Frozen Worlds"	2:53
18.	"The Oceans Belong to Us All"	"High Seas"	6:19
19.	"Deserts and Grasslands"	"Deserts and Grasslands"	2:56
20.	"The Mighty Mekong"	"Freshwater"	2:01
21.	"Corals"	"Coastal Seas"	2:17
22.	"Leaf Cutters"	"Jungles"	1:18
23.	"Chernobyl"	"Forests"	7:03
24.	"Into the Woodlands"	"One Planet"	4:35
25.	"Signature Moves"	"One Planet"	2:35
26.	"Every Other Breath You Take"	"High Seas"	4:21
27.	"Arctic Refugees"	"Frozen Worlds"	6:38
28.	"A Sudden Turn"	"High Seas"	2:11
29.	"A Nest of Bubbles"	"Freshwater"	1:56
30.	"He Wins Her Approval"	"Jungles"	1:42
31.	"Majestic Submarine Forests"	"Coastal Seas"	2:28
32.	"They Came Back"	"Deserts and Grasslands"	2:33
33.	"We Must Preserve What's Left"	"Jungles"	2:28
34.	"Ice Caves"	"Freshwater"	2:26
35.	"Mythical Creatures Follow"	"Frozen Worlds"	3:31
36.	"They Have Come to a Desert"	"Deserts and Grasslands"	1:41
37.	"This Glacial Ice"	"One Planet"	7:42
38.	"A Greater Resilience"	"Coastal Seas"	4:02
39.	"The Next Twenty Years"	"One Planet"	1:41
40.	"In This Together"	With Ellie Goulding	4:43
Total length:			120:26

== Broadcast ==
Starting from 20 June 2020, the series was aired on Indonesian television network TVRI as a part of Belajar dari Rumah (Study from Home) programming block, made possible by a partnership between the Ministry of Education and Culture and Netflix. The broadcast marked the first Netflix original documentary series ever aired on conventional television, alongside a collection of Netflix documentaries included in the partnership.

During the COVID-19 pandemic, Netflix has made the first series available for free streaming on YouTube as an educational resource.

== See also ==
- Environmental stewardship
- Our Universe
- Life on Our Planet
- Our Oceans
