= Alastair Fothergill =

British TV producer

Alastair Fothergill OBE
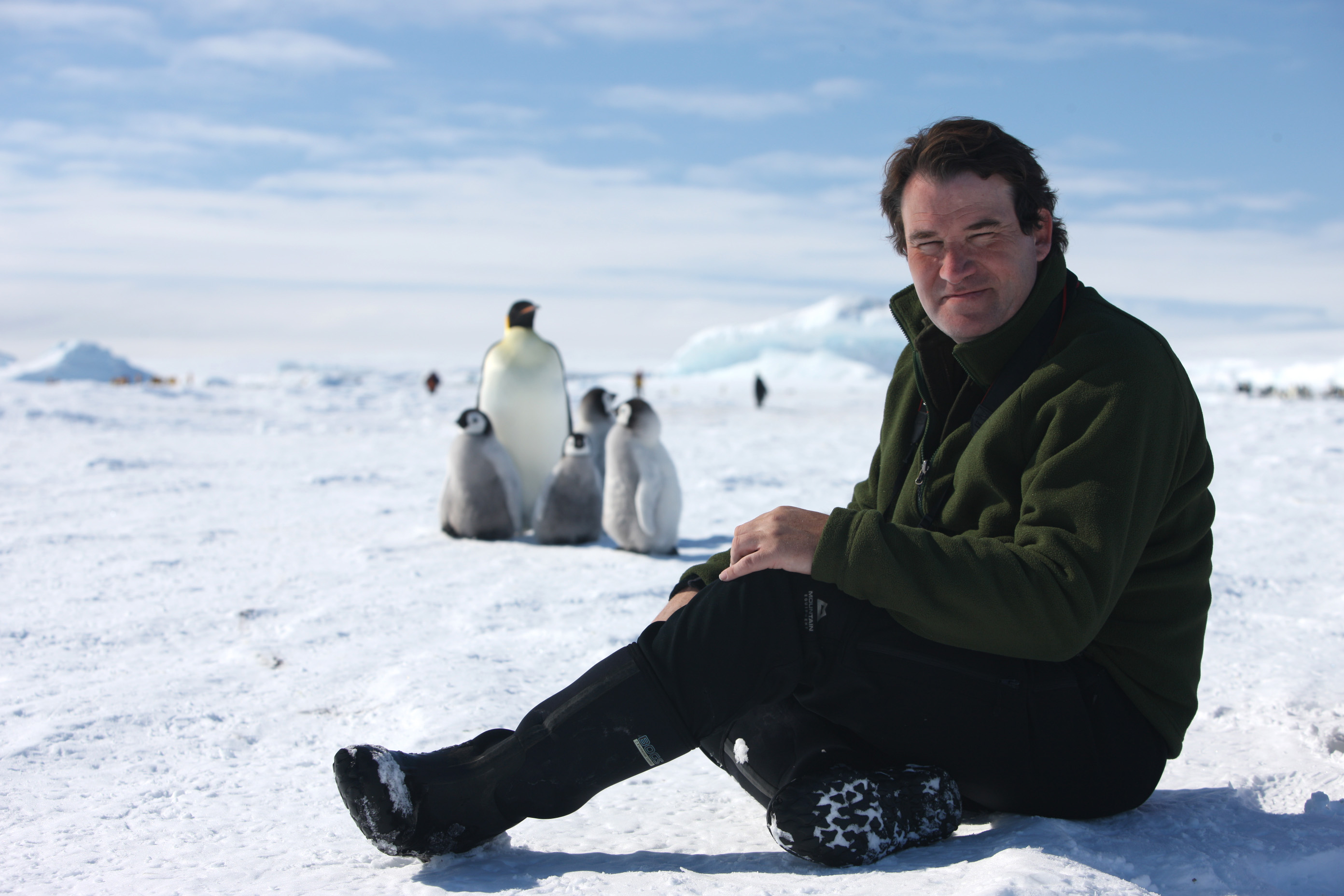
- Born: London, England
- Education: Durham University
- Children: 2

Alastair David William Fothergill OBE is a British producer of nature documentaries for television and cinema. He is the series producer of the series The Blue Planet (2001) and Planet Earth (2006) and the co-director of the associated feature films Deep Blue and Earth.

== Early life and education ==
Alastair David William Fothergill was born in London, England.

He attended Orley Farm School and Harrow School. He studied zoology at St Cuthbert's Society, Durham at Durham University and made his first film, On the Okavango, while still a student.

== Career ==
Fothergill joined the BBC Natural History Unit in 1983, working on The Really Wild Show, Wildlife on One and David Attenborough's The Trials of Life. He was appointed head of the Unit in 1992, and during his tenure he produced Attenborough's award-winning series Life in the Freezer.

He was awarded the Royal Geographical Society's Cherry Kearton Medal and Award in 1996.

In June 1998, he stood down as head of the Natural History Unit to concentrate on his work as series producer on the multi-award-winning The Blue Planet. In 2006 he completed his next major series Planet Earth, which won the Cinema for Peace Clean Energy Award at the Cinema for Peace Gala Berlin in 2008.

More recently he was executive producer of Frozen Planet (2011) and The Hunt (2015).

He has also presented several television programmes, including The Abyss and is the author of five books.

In 2008, he signed a multi-picture deal with newly formed Disneynature. The first few titles under the Disneynature deal had been, for now, African Cats (2011), Chimpanzee (2012), Bears (2014), Penguins (2019), Dolphin Reef (2020), and Polar Bear (2022) co-directed with Keith Scholey, Mark Linfield, and Jeff Wilson.

In 2012 he left the BBC to co-found Silverback Films with Keith Scholey. Silverback Films makes landmark natural history series for a variety of clients including Netflix ( Our Planet, Our Planet 2 and Life On Our Planet) and the BBC ( The Mating Game and Wild Isles).

In 2016, Fothergill was made a Fellow of the Royal Television Society for his work in natural history programming. He was appointed Officer of the Order of the British Empire (OBE) in the 2019 Birthday Honours for services to film.

== Personal life ==
As of 2001 Fothergill was living in Bristol with his wife Melinda (née Barker) and two sons.

== Film and television credits ==
- The Really Wild Show (1986) – producer
- Wild Britain (1987) – producer
- Reefwatch (1988) – associate producer
- Wildlife on One (1988–92) – producer
- The Trials of Life (1990) – assistant producer
- Life in the Freezer (1993) – series producer
- Natural World, episode "South Georgia: An Island All Alone" (1998) – producer
- The Blue Planet (2001) – series producer
- Going Ape (2002) – presenter (with Saba Douglas-Hamilton)
- The Abyss – Live (2002–2003) – executive dog and presenter (with Michael deGruy, Kate Humble and Peter Snow)
- Deep Blue (2003) – writer and director (with Andy Byatt)
- Planet Earth (2006) – series producer
- Earth (2006) – writer and director (with Mark Linfield)
- Frozen Planet (2011) – executive producer
- African Cats (2011) – writer and director (with Keith Scholey)
- Chimpanzee (2012) – writer and director (with Mark Linfield)
- Bears (2014) – director (with Keith Scholey)
- Monkey Kingdom (2015) – director and producer (with Mark Linfield)
- The Hunt (2015) – executive producer
- Our Planet (2019) – executive producer
- Penguins (2019) – director (with Jeff Wilson)
- Dolphin Reef (2020) – director (with Keith Scholey)
- David Attenborough: A Life on Our Planet (2020) – director and executive producer (with Keith Scholey)
- Polar Bear (2022) – director (with Jeff Wilson)
- Life on Our Planet – executive producer (with Steven Spielberg, Keith Scholey, Darryl Frank and Justin Falvey)
