= TCFA =

TCFA may refer to:

- Taichung Football Association, a football association in Taichung, Taiwan
- Tropical Cyclone Formation Alert, a bulletin in the United States
- Twentieth Century Fox Animation, the animation division of Twentieth Century Fox
