= 20th Century Animation =

Animation division of 20th Century Studios

20th Century Animation, Inc.
- Logo used since 2020

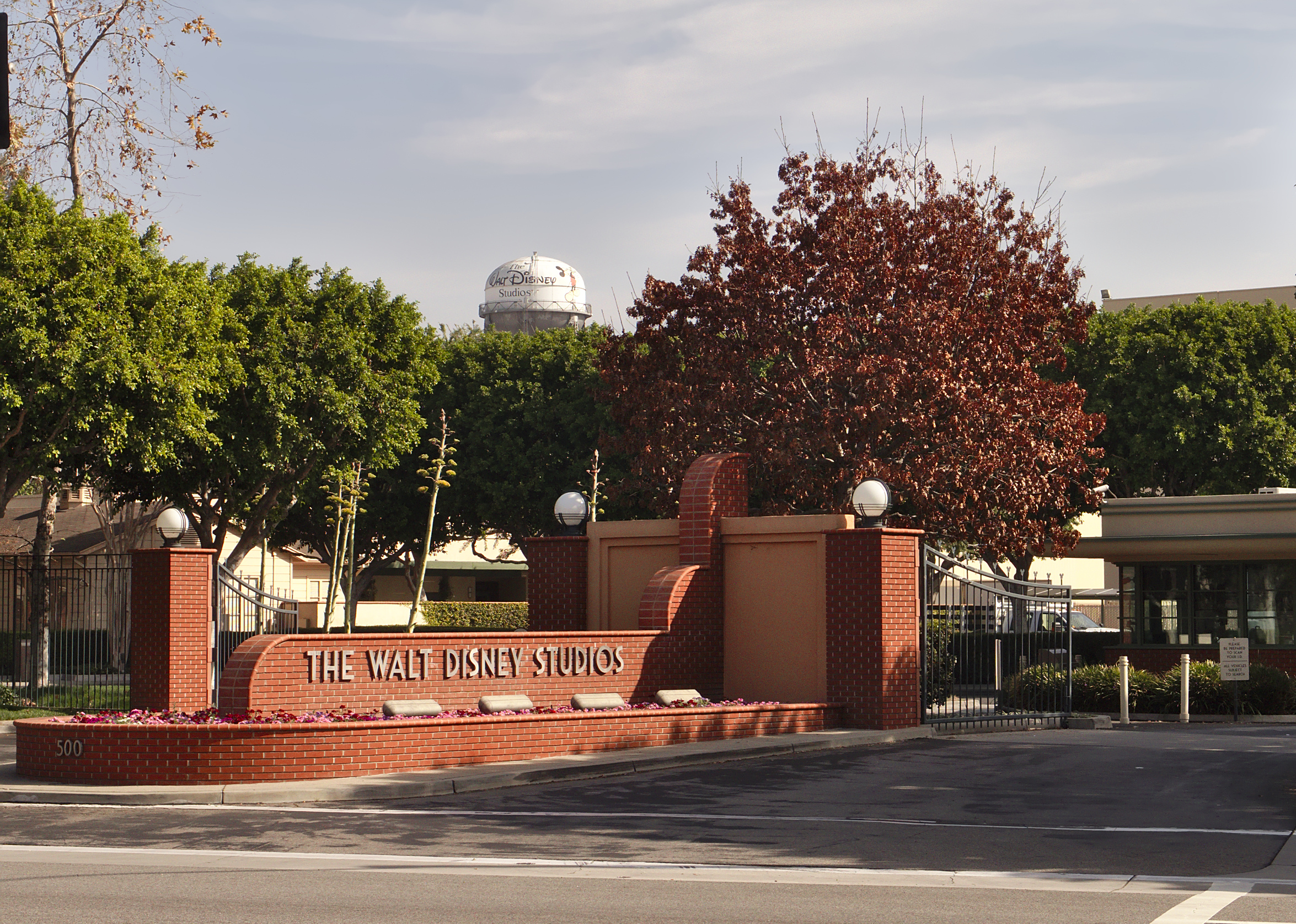
- The Walt Disney Studios' Riverside Drive property in Burbank, California
- Formerly: Fox Family Films (1994–1998); 20th Century Fox Animation (1998–2020)
- Type: Division
- Industry: Motion pictures; Animation
- Predecessors: Fox Animation Studios; Blue Sky Studios
- Founded: February 1994; 32 years ago
- Headquarters: Burbank, California, U.S.
- Key people: Paul Ohrt (SVP, animation production); Kathryn Jones (animation production executive); Lori Forte (producer)
- Products: Animated films
- Parent: 20th Century Studios

20th Century Animation, Inc. (previously known as Fox Family Films and 20th Century Fox Animation and sometimes referred to as Fox Animation) is an American animation studio located in Century City, Los Angeles, until its lease with Fox Corporation ended and it was relocated to the Walt Disney Studios in Burbank. Walt Disney Studios Motion Pictures distributes and markets the films produced by this studio in theatrical markets. Formed in February 1994, it is organized as a division and label of 20th Century Studios, a subsidiary of the Walt Disney Studios, and specializes in producing animated feature-length films. At one point, 20th Century Animation had two subsidiaries: Don Bluth's Fox Animation Studios, which was closed on June 26, 2000, and Blue Sky Studios (the latter became the primary unit of 20th Century Animation), which was closed on April 10, 2021. The studio is one of Disney's three feature animation studios, alongside Walt Disney Animation Studios and Pixar Animation Studios.

The studio has produced a total of 36 feature films (six films as Fox Family Films, three films from Fox Animation Studios, thirteen feature films from Blue Sky Studios, and fourteen original films), most of them being distributed by 20th Century Studios. Their first film was Mighty Morphin Power Rangers: The Movie and their first animated film was Anastasia, with the most recent release being Diary of a Wimpy Kid: The Last Straw. Its upcoming slate of films include Diary of a Wimpy Kid Christmas: The Getaway slated for release on December 4, 2026, Ice Age: Boiling Point slated for theatrical release on February 5, 2027, and The New Simpsons Movie slated for theatrical release on September 3, 2027.

Anastasia, Ice Age and Rio are the studio's most commercially successful franchises, while Robots (2005), The Simpsons Movie (2007), Horton Hears a Who! (2008), Fantastic Mr. Fox (2009), The Book of Life (2014), The Peanuts Movie (2015), Spies in Disguise (2019), Ron's Gone Wrong (2021), and Predator: Killer of Killers (2025) are among its most critically praised films.

== Background ==
Before 20th Century Fox started its animation division, Fox were merely distributors for independent animation studio Terrytoons. Fox would later release its first seven animated films, such as Hugo the Hippo (1975), Wizards, Raggedy Ann & Andy: A Musical Adventure (1977), Fire and Ice (1983), FernGully: The Last Rainforest (1992) Once Upon a Forest (1993) and The Pagemaster (1994), most of them licensed from third-parties, while others produced in-house.

In May 1993, Fox agreed to a two-year first-look deal with Nickelodeon for family films. The deal would mostly include original material, though a Nickelodeon executive did not rule out the possibility of making films based on The Ren & Stimpy Show, Rugrats and Doug. However, no films came out of the deal due to the 1994 acquisition of Paramount Pictures by Nickelodeon's parent company, Viacom, and they would distribute the film projects instead.

== History ==
=== 1994–1998: Formation and early years ===
The division initially started in February 1994 as Fox Family Films, as one of four film divisions of 20th Century Fox under executive John Matoian. The division was planned to produce six feature films a year as part of a plan to produce more films per year overall. Fox senior vice president of production Chris Meledandri was transferred into the unit as executive vice president in March 1994 after having been hired the previous year. The week of May 6, 1994, Fox Family announced the hiring of Don Bluth and Gary Goldman for a new $100 million animation studio which began construction that year in Phoenix, Arizona. In three years, the animation studio would produce and release its first film, Anastasia. In September 1994, Matoian was promoted by Rupert Murdoch to head up the Fox network. Meledandri was selected to head up the unit in 1994.

It produced live-action films such as Mighty Morphin Power Rangers: The Movie (1995), Dunston Checks In (1996) and Home Alone 3. By August 1997, Fox Family had decreased the number of live films. R.L. Stine agreed with Fox Family Films in January 1998 for a film adaptation of the Goosebumps book franchise with Tim Burton producing.

=== 1997–2020: 20th Century Fox Animation, Fox Animation Studios and success with Blue Sky Studios ===
In August 1997, Fox's Los Angeles-based visual effects company, VIFX, acquired majority interest in Blue Sky Studios to form a new visual effects and animation company, temporarily renamed "Blue Sky/VIFX". Blue Sky had previously did the character animation of MTV Films' first film Joe's Apartment. Following the studio's expansion, Blue Sky produced character animation for the films Alien Resurrection, A Simple Wish, Mouse Hunt, Star Trek: Insurrection and Fight Club. VIFX was later sold to another VFX studio Rhythm and Hues Studios in March 1999. According to Blue Sky founder Chris Wedge, Fox considered selling Blue Sky as well by 2000 due to financial difficulties in the visual effects industry in general.

In 1998, following the success of Anastasia, the division was renamed to 20th Century Fox Animation, refocusing on animated feature films, including stop-motion, mixed media and digital production. The division's live action films in development at the time included Marvel Comics' Silver Surfer, the disaster film spoof Disaster Area, Fantastic Voyage and Goosebumps. The 1998 film Ever After, a Cinderella adaptation, was the division's last live action film. At this time, there were several animated films on the company's development slate: Dark Town with Henry Selick, Chris Columbus and Sam Hamm, Santa Calls at Blue Sky, and Matt Groening (The Simpsons), Steve Oedekerk and Joss Whedon (Buffy the Vampire Slayer) projects. The Phoenix studio at the time was producing Planet Ice expected in 1999 and directed by Art Vitello and Anastasia producer/directors Don Bluth and Gary Goldman's then soon to be announced project. Chris Meledandri remained as the president of the division. The only television series that the Phoenix studio produced was Adventures from the Book of Virtues, which was a co-production between Fox Animation Studios and PorchLight Entertainment; that series would air on PBS between 1996 and December 2000.

Logo used as 20th Century Fox Animation from 1998 to 2020

20th Century Fox Animation vice president of physical production Chuck Richardson was sent in early December 1999 to Fox subsidiary Blue Sky Studios as general manager and senior vice president. Richardson was sent to prepare Blue Sky for feature animation production.

Fox Animation Studios laid off 2/3 of its employee workforce in February 2000 before its closure in late June of that year, ten days after Titan A.E. was released and six months before Adventures from the Book of Virtues aired its final episode. Fox Animation looked to produce films at Blue Sky and its Los Angeles headquarters.

Chris Wedge, film producer Lori Forte, and Meledandri presented Fox with a script for a comedy feature film titled Ice Age. Studio management pressured staff to sell their remaining shares and options to Fox on the promise of continued employment on feature-length films. The studio moved to White Plains NY and started production on Ice Age. As the film wrapped, Fox, having little faith in the film, feared that it might bomb at the box office, terminated half of the production staff, and tried unsuccessfully to find a buyer for the film and the studio. Instead, Ice Age, Blue Sky's first feature film, was released by Fox in conjunction with 20th Century Fox Animation on March 15, 2002, with financial success and critical acclaim, receiving a nomination for an Academy Award for Best Animated Feature at the 75th Academy Awards in 2003. Ice Age would subsequently spawn a successful franchise and launch Blue Sky into producing feature films and into becoming a household name in feature animation.

In January 2007, Meledandri left for Universal Pictures to set up Illumination there with Vanessa Morrison as his replacement while answering to newly appointed 20th Century Fox Film Group vice chairman Hutch Parker. Morrison moved from the live action division where she handled family-children fare as senior vice president of production. Morrision was making deal with outside producers like she approved a stop-motion adaptation of Roald Dahl's Fantastic Mr. Fox.

In September 2017, Locksmith Animation formed a multi-year production deal with 20th Century Fox, who would distribute Locksmith's films, with Locksmith aiming to release a film every 12–18 months. Fox Animation was later brought on to oversee the deal, which was to bolster Blue Sky's output and replace the loss of distributing DreamWorks Animation films, which are now owned and distributed by Universal Pictures, following its acquisition by NBCUniversal in 2016.

On October 30, 2017, Morrison was named president of a newly created 20th Century Fox division, Fox Family, which has a mandate similar to Fox Animation when it was called Fox Family Films. Andrea Miloro and Robert Baird were named co-president of Fox Animation the same day and would also have direct oversight of Blue Sky and oversee the Locksmith Animation deal and grow Fox Animation with other partnerships and producer deals.

=== 2019–present: Acquisition by Disney, renaming, closure of Blue Sky Studios, and subsequent return to producing theatrical films ===
On October 18, 2018, it was announced that Fox Animation would be added alongside 20th Century Fox to Walt Disney Studios following the acquisition of 21st Century Fox by Disney, with co-presidents Andrea Miloro and Robert Baird retaining leadership while reporting to Walt Disney Studios Chairman, Alan Horn and Twentieth Century Fox vice chairman Emma Watts.

On March 21, 2019, Disney announced that Fox Animation (including Blue Sky Studios) would be integrated as new units within Walt Disney Studios, with Co-presidents Andrea Miloro and Robert Baird continuing to lead the studio and reporting directly to Alan Horn. Miloro stepped down as co-president in late July 2019. In August 2019, Walt Disney Animation Studios head Andrew Millstein was named co-president of Blue Sky for day-to-day operations alongside Baird, while Pixar Animation Studios president Jim Morris would also be taking on a supervisory role over Millstein. With the Disney takeover, the Locksmith deal left 20th Century Fox for Warner Bros. in October 2019, except for the first and now only film under the deal, Ron's Gone Wrong.

With the August 2019 20th Century Fox slate overhaul announcement, projects from 20th Century Fox franchises such as Night at the Museum, Diary of a Wimpy Kid, and Ice Age were announced for the then-upcoming Disney+ streaming service. These projects would later be announced during Disney's Investor Day in December 2020 as animated feature films for the aforementioned streaming service. The first of these projects was an animated reboot of Diary of a Wimpy Kid, which was released on December 3, 2021, under Walt Disney Pictures.

On January 17, 2020, Disney dropped the "Fox" name from the two main film studio units acquired from 21st Century Fox—20th Century Fox and Fox Searchlight Pictures. Fox Animation took on its current name with its incorporation on January 28, 2020, to avoid confusion with Fox Corporation.

On February 9, 2021, Disney announced that it would be shutting down Blue Sky Studios in April 2021, the main subsidiary of 20th Century Animation. It closed on April 10, 2021, and Blue Sky's film library and intellectual properties were retained and absorbed into 20th Century Animation. After the closure of Blue Sky Studios, Robert Baird went on to co-found Annapurna Animation with Andrea Miloro the following year in December.

On November 8, 2024, during D23 in Brazil, it was officially announced that the studio would return to producing theatrical films starting with Ice Age: Boiling Point slated for February 5, 2027.

In April 2025, the studio announced Predator: Killer of Killers its first adult animated feature film not to be based on an animated sitcom slated for a June 6, 2025 release on Hulu. That same month, Disney announced that it would not renew its lease with Fox Corporation and that it would vacate the Fox Studio Lot in Century City at the end of 2025. As a result, 20th Century Animation relocated to the Walt Disney Studios in Burbank.

In September 2025, the studio confirmed that The New Simpsons Movie was slated for September 3, 2027.

== Process ==
Rather than having a consistent in-house animation style like Disney's other two feature animation studios, Pixar and Walt Disney Animation Studios, 20th Century Animation acts as a division and somewhat of a distribution label for animated films that are made under or acquired by 20th Century Studios. An example of this is with Fox Animation Studios and Blue Sky Studios' films; both of which were subsidiaries of the company. Another example of this is Fantastic Mr. Fox. Additionally, Ron's Gone Wrong was the first and only film made under a deal between 20th Century and Locksmith Animation.

However, in a similar fashion to Sony Pictures Animation, Paramount Animation, and Warner Bros. Pictures Animation, the animation production of 20th Century Animation's films (except for Blue Sky Studios) is outsourced to other studios. For example, The Simpsons Movie was animated at Film Roman alongside AKOM and Rough Draft Studios, while Ron's Gone Wrong was animated by DNEG. The Book of Life was developed outside of 20th Century Animation at Reel FX, with the studio co-producing the film later on. The Diary of a Wimpy Kid films and The Ice Age Adventures of Buck Wild were animated by Bardel Entertainment.

Fox Animation Studios (headquartered in Phoenix, Arizona) and Blue Sky Studios (headquartered in White Plains, New York, and later Greenwich, Connecticut) animated their respective films internally; however, Anastasia and Titan A.E. were outsourced to multiple animation studios, including Bardel Entertainment, Reality Check Studios, and Blue Sky, when the latter of the three was still a VFX studio.

Both Fox Animation Studios and Blue Sky had their own unique animation style, with the former having the same animation style as Don Bluth Entertainment due to both Don Bluth Entertainment and Fox Animation Studios being founded by the same animator, Don Bluth.

== Filmography ==
Release timeline
1995	Mighty Morphin Power Rangers: The Movie
1996	Dunston Checks In
1996	Jingle All the Way
1997	Turbo: A Power Rangers Movie
1997	Anastasia
1997	Home Alone 3
1998	Ever After
1999	Bartok the Magnificent
2000	Titan A.E.
2001
2002	Ice Age
2003
2004
2005	Robots
2006	Ice Age: The Meltdown
2007	The Simpsons Movie
2008	Dr. Seuss' Horton Hears a Who!
2009	Ice Age: Dawn of the Dinosaurs
2009	Fantastic Mr. Fox
2010
2011	Rio
2012	Ice Age: Continental Drift
2013	Epic
2014	Rio 2
2014	The Book of Life
2015	The Peanuts Movie
2016	Ice Age: Collision Course
2017	Ferdinand
2018	Isle of Dogs
2019	Spies in Disguise
2020
2021	Ron's Gone Wrong
2021	Diary of a Wimpy Kid
2022	The Ice Age Adventures of Buck Wild
2022	The Bob's Burgers Movie
2022	Diary of a Wimpy Kid: Rodrick Rules
2022	Night at the Museum: Kahmunrah Rises Again
2023	Diary of a Wimpy Kid Christmas: Cabin Fever
2024
2025	Predator: Killer of Killers
2025	Diary of a Wimpy Kid: The Last Straw
2026	Diary of a Wimpy Kid Christmas: The Getaway
2027	Ice Age: Boiling Point
2027	The New Simpsons Movie

=== Fox Family Films ===
Title	Release date	Notes
Mighty Morphin Power Rangers: The Movie	June 30, 1995	co-production with Saban Entertainment and Toei Company
Dunston Checks In	January 12, 1996	
Jingle All the Way	November 22, 1996	co-production with 1492 Pictures
Turbo: A Power Rangers Movie	March 28, 1997	co-production with Saban Entertainment and Toei Company
Home Alone 3	December 12, 1997	co-production with Hughes Entertainment
Ever After	July 31, 1998	

=== Fox Animation Studios ===
From 1994 to 2000, Fox operated Fox Animation Studios, a 2D hand drawn/CGI animation studio which was started to compete with Walt Disney Animation Studios, which was experiencing great success with films such as The Little Mermaid, Beauty and the Beast, Aladdin and The Lion King. The Fox studio, however, was not as successful. Their first feature, Anastasia, was a great success that made nearly $140 million at the worldwide box office on a $53 million budget in 1997, but their next feature, Titan A.E., was a large financial loss, losing $100 million for 20th Century Fox in 2000. The lack of box office success, coupled with the rise of computer animation, led Fox to shut down the studios.

=== Blue Sky Studios ===
Blue Sky Studios logo

From 1997 until 2021, Fox owned Blue Sky Studios, a computer animation company known for the Ice Age franchise. Fox has had much more success with the studio, with the box office receipts of their films becoming competitive with the likes of Pixar and DreamWorks Animation. On March 21, 2019, Blue Sky Studios was integrated as a separate unit within Walt Disney Studios, yet they would continue to report to Fox Animation presidents Andrea Miloro and Robert Baird. In February 2021, Disney had announced that Blue Sky would cease all operations and close sometime within April 2021, eventually shuttering on April 10, 2021.

=== Original films and co-productions ===
Starting in 2007, 20th Century Animation occasionally produces its own films without Blue Sky Studios' involvement while also co-producing films from other studios. The company is not credited on these films like how they are with Blue Sky's films and Fox Animation Studios' Anastasia and Titan A.E. As of 2025, The Simpsons Movie remains their highest-grossing original film.

All films listed are produced and or distributed by 20th Century Studios unless noted otherwise.

==== Theatrical ====
No.	Title	Release date	Director(s)	Co-production with	Distributor	Budget	Gross	RT	MC
1	The Simpsons Movie	July 27, 2007	David Silverman	Gracie Films	20th Century Fox	$75 million	$536.4 million	88%	80
2	Fantastic Mr. Fox	November 13, 2009	Wes Anderson	Indian Paintbrush; Regency Enterprises; American Empirical Pictures	20th Century Fox	$40 million	$58.1 million	93%	83
3	The Book of Life	October 17, 2014	Jorge R. Gutierrez	Reel FX Animation Studios; Chatrone; Mexopolis (uncredited)	20th Century Fox (Note: distribution only)	$50 million	$99.8 million	82%	67
4	Isle of Dogs	March 23, 2018	Wes Anderson	Indian Paintbrush; American Empirical Pictures; Studio Babelsberg; Scott Rudin Productions; 3 Mills Studios	Fox Searchlight Pictures	—	$73 million	90%	82
5	Ron's Gone Wrong	October 22, 2021	Sarah Smith; Jean-Philippe Vine	Locksmith Animation	20th Century Studios (Note: under Walt Disney Studios Motion Pictures & distribution only)	—N/a	$60.7 million	80%	65
6	The Bob's Burgers Movie	May 27, 2022	Loren Bouchard; Bernard Derriman	Bento Box Entertainment; Wilo Productions; 20th Television Animation	20th Century Studios (Note: under Walt Disney Studios Motion Pictures)	$38 million	$34.2 million	87%	75

==== Upcoming ====
No.	Title	Release date	Director(s)	Co-production with	Distributor
1	Ice Age: Boiling Point	February 5, 2027	John C. Donkin	—N/a	20th Century Studios
2	The New Simpsons Movie	September 3, 2027	—N/a	Gracie Films; 20th Television Animation	20th Century Studios

==== Direct-to-streaming (VOD) ====
No.	Title	Release date	Director(s)	Co-production with	Distributor	Budget	RT	MC
1	Diary of a Wimpy Kid	December 3, 2021	Swinton Scott	Walt Disney Pictures (Note: The film was originally produced by 20th Century Studios, but was released under Walt Disney Pictures.)	Disney+	—N/a	73%	50
2	The Ice Age Adventures of Buck Wild	January 28, 2022	John C. Donkin	Walt Disney Pictures	Disney+	—N/a	19%	30
3	Diary of a Wimpy Kid: Rodrick Rules	December 2, 2022	Luke Cormican	Walt Disney Pictures	Disney+	—N/a	50%	TBA
4	Night at the Museum: Kahmunrah Rises Again	December 9, 2022	Matt Danner	Walt Disney Pictures; 21 Laps Entertainment; Alibaba Pictures	Disney+	—N/a	71%	TBA
5	Diary of a Wimpy Kid Christmas: Cabin Fever	December 8, 2023	Luke Cormican	Walt Disney Pictures (Note: While the film is released under the Walt Disney Pictures banner, the film's copyright is credited to 20th Century Studios.)	Disney+	—N/a	67%	TBA
6	Predator: Killer of Killers	June 6, 2025	Dan Trachtenberg Co-director: Josh Wassung	20th Century Studios; Davis Entertainment; The Third Floor, Inc. Lawrence Gordon Productions	Hulu	$50 million	98%	78
7	Diary of a Wimpy Kid: The Last Straw	December 5, 2025	Matt Danner	Walt Disney Pictures	Disney+	TBA		
8	Diary of a Wimpy Kid Christmas: The Getaway	December 4, 2026	Matt Danner	Walt Disney Pictures	Disney+	TBA	TBA	TBA

^{S} Combines live-action with animation.

==== In development ====
Title	Notes
Untitled sixth Diary of a Wimpy Kid film	
Untitled Family Guy film	co-production with Fuzzy Door Productions
Untitled third Rio film	
Untitled fifth Futurama film	co-production with The Curiosity Company
Untitled Avatar animated film	co-production with Lightstorm Entertainment

^{S} Combines live-action with animation.

=== Direct-to-video films ===
#	Title	Release date	
1	Stewie Griffin: The Untold Story	September 27, 2005	co-production with Fox Television Animation and Fuzzy Door Productions
2	Futurama: Bender's Big Score	November 27, 2007	co-production with The Curiosity Company, 20th Century Fox Television, and Fox Television Animation
3	Futurama: The Beast with a Billion Backs	June 24, 2008	co-production with The Curiosity Company, 20th Century Fox Television, and Fox Television Animation
4	Futurama: Bender's Game	November 4, 2008	co-production with The Curiosity Company, 20th Century Fox Television, and Fox Television Animation
5	Futurama: Into the Wild Green Yonder	February 24, 2009	co-production with The Curiosity Company, 20th Century Fox Television, and Fox Television Animation

=== Television film/specials ===
#	Title	Release date	Notes
1	Olive, the Other Reindeer	December 17, 1999	co-production with The Curiosity Company, DNA Productions, Flower Films, and Fox Television Studios
2	Ice Age: A Mammoth Christmas	November 24, 2011	co-production with Blue Sky Studios and Reel FX Creative Studios
3	Ice Age: The Great Egg-Scapade	March 20, 2016	co-production with Blue Sky Studios, 20th Century Fox Television and Arc Productions

=== Short films ===
#	Title	Release date	Notes
1	Gone Nutty	November 26, 2002	co-production with Blue Sky Studios
2	Inside the CIA	April 8, 2005	co-production with Fox Television Animation and Fuzzy Door Productions; released with Fever Pitch
3	Aunt Fanny's Tour of Booty	September 27, 2005	co-production with Blue Sky Studios and Reel FX Creative Studios
4	No Time for Nuts	November 21, 2006	co-production with Blue Sky Studios
5	Surviving Sid	December 9, 2008	co-production with Blue Sky Studios
6	Scrat's Continental Crack-Up	December 25, 2010	co-production with Blue Sky Studios
7	Scrat's Continental Crack-Up: Part 2	December 16, 2011	co-production with Blue Sky Studios
8	The Longest Daycare	July 13, 2012	co-production with Gracie Films, AKOM Studios, and Film Roman; released with Ice Age: Continental Drift
9	Umbrellacorn	July 26, 2013	co-production with Blue Sky Studios
10	Cosmic Scrat-tastrophe	November 6, 2015	co-production with Blue Sky Studios
11	Scrat: Spaced Out	October 11, 2016	co-production with Blue Sky Studios
12	Playdate with Destiny	March 6, 2020	co-production with Gracie Films; released with Onward; first short film produced under Disney
13	Ice Age: Scrat Tales	April 13, 2022	uncredited; co-production with Blue Sky Studios; distributed by Disney+
14	My Butt Has a Fever	May 2022	co-production with Bento Box Entertainment; released in Alamo Drafthouse Cinema theaters

== Franchises ==
This list does not include follow-up films not produced by 20th Century Animation

Years	Title	Films	TV seasons	Shorts	Studio
1997–present	Anastasia	2	0	0	Fox Animation Studios (1997–1999)
2002–present	Ice Age	7	1	9	Blue Sky Studios (2002–2022)
2007–present	The Simpsons	1	37	5	Gracie Films
2011–present	Rio	2	0	1	Blue Sky Studios (2011–2014)
2021–present	Diary of a Wimpy Kid	4	0	0	Bardel Entertainment

== Accolades ==
=== Academy Awards ===
Year	Film	Category	Recipient(s)	Result
1997	Anastasia	Best Music, Original Song	"Journey to the Past" by Stephen Flaherty (music), Lynn Ahrens (lyrics)	Nominated
1997	Anastasia	Best Music, Original Musical or Comedy Score	Lynn Ahrens, Stephen Flaherty, and David Newman	Nominated
2002	Ice Age	Best Animated Feature	Chris Wedge	Nominated
2009	Fantastic Mr. Fox	Best Animated Feature	Wes Anderson	Nominated
2011	Rio	Best Original Song	"Real in Rio" by Carlinhos Brown & Sérgio Mendes (music); Siedah Garrett (lyrics)	Nominated
2017	Ferdinand	Best Animated Feature	Carlos Saldanha and Lori Forte	Nominated
2018	Isle of Dogs	Best Animated Feature	Wes Anderson, Scott Rudin, Steven Rales, and Jeremy Dawson	Nominated

=== Annie Awards ===
Year	Film	Category	Recipient(s)	Result
1997	Anastasia	Best Animated Feature	20th Century Fox, Fox Animation Studios	Nominated
2000	Titan A.E.	Best Animated Feature	20th Century Fox Animation, Fox Animation Studios, David Kirschner Productions	Nominated
2002	Ice Age	Best Animated Feature	20th Century Fox Animation, Blue Sky Studios	Nominated
2007	The Simpsons Movie	Best Animated Feature	20th Century Fox Animation	Nominated
2009	Fantastic Mr. Fox	Best Animated Feature	20th Century Fox	Nominated
2011	Rio	Best Animated Feature	Blue Sky Studios	Nominated
2014	The Book of Life	Best Animated Feature	20th Century Fox, Reel FX Animation Studios	Nominated
2015	The Peanuts Movie	Best Animated Feature	20th Century Fox Animation, Blue Sky Studios	Nominated
2021	Ron's Gone Wrong	Outstanding Achievement for Character Design in a Feature Production	Julien Bizat	Nominated
2021	Ron's Gone Wrong	Outstanding Achievement for Production Design in an Animated Feature Production	Aurélien Predal, Till Nowak and Nathan Crowley	Nominated

=== British Animation Awards ===
Year	Film	Category	Recipient(s)	Result
2022	Ron's Gone Wrong	Best Long Form	Sarah Smith, Jean-Philippe Vine and Octavio E. Rodriguez	Won
2022	Ron's Gone Wrong	Best Design	Sarah Smith, Jean-Philippe Vine and Octavio E. Rodriguez	Won
2022	Ron's Gone Wrong	Writers Award	Sarah Smith and Peter Baynham	Nominated

=== Golden Globe Awards ===
Year	Film	Category	Recipient(s)	Result
2015	The Peanuts Movie	Best Animated Feature Film	Steve Martino	Nominated
2017	Ferdinand	Best Animated Feature Film	Carlos Saldanha	Nominated
2017	Ferdinand	Best Original Song	"Home" Music by: Nick Jonas, Nick Monson and Justin Tranter, Lyrics by: Jonas and Tranter	Nominated

== See also ==
- Fox Animation Studios
- Blue Sky Studios
- 20th Television Animation
- List of 20th Century Studios theatrical animated feature films
- List of Disney theatrical animated feature films
- Walt Disney Animation Studios
- Pixar
- Terrytoons
