= Diary of a Wimpy Kid (disambiguation) =

Diary of a Wimpy Kid is a series of novels by Jeff Kinney. The first novel in that series was published on April 1, 2007.

Diary of a Wimpy Kid may also refer to:

- Diary of a Wimpy Kid (book), the first book in the series
- Diary of a Wimpy Kid (film series), a film series based on the novels
  - Diary of a Wimpy Kid (2010 film), the first film in the series
  - Diary of a Wimpy Kid (2021 film), an animated film
