= Diary of a Wimpy Kid Christmas: Cabin Fever =

2023 film by Luke Cormican

- Official poster
- Directed by: Luke Cormican
- Screenplay by: Jeff Kinney
- Based on: Diary of a Wimpy Kid: Cabin Fever by Jeff Kinney
- Produced by: Jeff Kinney
- Starring: Wesley Kimmel; Spencer Howell; Erica Cerra; Hunter Dillon; Chris Diamantopoulos
- Edited by: Adam Pateman
- Music by: John Paesano
- Production companies: Walt Disney Pictures (Note: While the film is released under the Walt Disney Pictures banner, the film is copyrighted to 20th Century Studios.); Bardel Entertainment
- Distributed by: Disney+
- Release date: December 8, 2023
- Running time: 62 minutes
- Countries: United States; Canada
- Language: English

Diary of a Wimpy Kid Christmas: Cabin Fever is a 2023 animated Christmas comedy film directed by Luke Cormican and written and produced by Jeff Kinney, based on his book. It is the sequel to Diary of a Wimpy Kid: Rodrick Rules (2022), the seventh installment in the Diary of a Wimpy Kid film series, and the third animated installment. It stars the voices of Wesley Kimmel, Spencer Howell, Hunter Dillon, Erica Cerra and Chris Diamantopoulos.

Diary of a Wimpy Kid Christmas: Cabin Fever was produced by Walt Disney Pictures and Bardel Entertainment, with the latter providing animation services, and it was released on Disney+, as an original film, on December 8, 2023. It received mixed to positive reviews from critics. An additional sequel based on The Last Straw was released on December 5, 2025.

== Plot ==
It is the Christmas season, and Greg is trying to remain good so that he can get the new video game console, the Mega Station 9000. He has only two weeks left as his mother, Susan, attempts to put the family in the holiday spirit. She introduces them to Elfrendo, a creepy stuffed elf doll that her grandmother made when she was a kid, and who supposedly watches their every move for Santa and becomes a source of annoyance for Greg.

To stay good, Greg gets his friend Rowley to build a snowman with him but create a snowball so large that it rips up the lawn. Down Surrey Street, a snowplow woman is ambushed by teenagers. Greg and Rowley accidentally knock their large snowball down the street that damages the snowplow's blade. The two run from the woman and lose her. Knowing they will be identified by their clothing items; they drop them off in a dumpster. When they return home, Susan forces the family into a Christmas drive through town where Greg learns that the dumpster was actually a toy donation bin. The next day wanted posters of the "assailants" are posted everywhere and Greg and Rowley plan to get their things back.

The next day, a snowstorm has snowed everyone in, just as Frank was worrying about it. The family is forced to remain indoors until the storm passes strong which could take a week; this is made all more difficult when the power goes out. Greg feels better when he finds that he did get the game console but starts to succumb to family tension. Frank attempts to keep inventory in check, though he notices food and supplies are suddenly missing. Rodrick tries to power the doorbell camera in an attempt to find the culprits, after falsely assuming that two high schoolers stole Greg and Rowley's things and caused the snowplow damage. The Heffleys begins to suffer from cabin fever, but it gets worse when their water pipes burst. After Susan and Frank argue, and when Manny goes missing, the four search for him and find that he has been hoarding much of their supplies and has been grounded.

Seeing as how it is Christmas Eve, Susan has everyone open one present early, making everyone feel better. Greg expects his early present to be the Mega Station, though finds it to be clothing items from Aunt Lydia instead. They notice that it has stopped snowing, and Greg sneaks out to enact his plan. He recruits Rowley and they make their way to the donation bin, though they have to dig firmly for it due to the storm burying it. They find their things, but Rowley abandons Greg when the snowplow lady from earlier arrives. She is impressed with Greg having shoveled all the snow and offers him a ride back to his house. Greg learns that the lady is a single mother who only does snow plowing as a side job to support her and her son, Tyler. She wanted to get him a Mega Station but cannot afford it. Greg leaves on good terms with her, even though she spots the clothing items he retrieved, the lady forgives him and they part.

Greg returns just as the power returns to the neighborhood and the family celebrate. They see a police car pull up and realize that Greg is the snowball culprit. The Heffleys instead decide to hide the evidence, but Greg decides to turn himself in. It turns out that the police were simply collecting unwanted toys and Greg decides to give up his Mega Station to the snowplow lady and Tyler. Greg now appreciates his family even more but promises himself that he will get the video game console that comes out next year instead. He throws Elfrendo away in the bin, though he returns, continuously watching over Greg.

== Voice cast ==
- Wesley Kimmel as Greg Heffley, an early teenager and the middle brother. Brady Noon originally voiced him in the first two movies.
- Spencer Howell as Rowley Jefferson, Greg's best friend. Ethan William Childress originally voiced him in the first two movies.
- Erica Cerra as Susan Heffley, the three brothers’ mother
- Chris Diamantopoulos as Frank Heffley, the brothers’ father
- Hunter Dillon as Rodrick Heffley, the drummer of Löded Diper and Greg's older brother
- Gracen Newton as Manny Heffley, Greg's mischievous younger brother
- Lisa Ann Walter as Gabby, also called the Snowplow Lady and the mother of Tyler
- Gabriel Iglesias as Officer Vasquez
- Ego Nwodim as Officer Leonard
- Christian Convery (uncredited) as Fregley, Greg's school classmate
- Randy Pearlstein as Robert Jefferson, Rowley's father
- Windham Rotunda as a prison guard in Greg’s nightmarish imagination about ending up in prison. This was Rotunda's only film role before dying a few months prior the film's release.

== Production ==
An animated adaptation of Cabin Fever originally began production in December 2012, being intended to serve as an animated Cabin Fever holiday special for Fox. In August 2013, Kinney disclosed it would be a half-hour television special, and would air on Fox sometime in late 2014. This special never released, and overtime work on it eventually morphed into the original Diary of a Wimpy Kid animated film. Later, on October 23, 2021, ahead of the first animated film's release, Kinney revealed that sequels were already in development. The project was announced to be an adaptation of Cabin Fever in an interview with Kinney in January 2023.

On September 8, 2023, Jeff Kinney revealed the release date is December 8. John Paesano returned as composer from the previous two films. The official trailer for the film appeared online on November 14.

== Release ==
The film was released on Disney+ as an original film on December 8, 2023.

== Reception ==
On the review aggregator site Rotten Tomatoes, the film holds a 75% approval rating based on reviews from 8 critics, with an average rating of 7.00/10.

Roger Moore gave the film a 1.5 out of 4, calling the film's message "loud and clear", its comedy "paper thin", and the animation "adequate".

== Sequel ==
In December 2022, Kinney confirmed an adaptation of The Last Straw was in the works for Disney+. Diary of a Wimpy Kid: The Last Straw was released on December 5, 2025.
