= Bardel Entertainment =

Canadian animation studio

- Logo used since 2022
- Type: Subsidiary
- Industry: Animation
- Founded: 1987; 39 years ago
- Founder: Barry Ward; Delna Bhesania
- Headquarters: Vancouver, British Columbia, Canada
- Key people: Tina Chow (CEO); Richard Grieve (COO)
- Parent: Rainbow (2015–present)
- Website: bardel.ca

Bardel Entertainment (formerly Bardel Animation) is a Canadian animation studio founded in Vancouver, British Columbia, in 1987. The studio's name comes from its founders, Barry Ward and his wife Delna Bhesania.

Bardel is involved in the acquisition, development, production and distribution of animated programming. The studio is best known for animating Rick and Morty, Teen Titans Go!, Teenage Mutant Ninja Turtles, and The Dragon Prince. On October 5, 2015, Bardel was purchased by Rainbow, an Italian studio owned by Iginio Straffi and formerly co-owned by Paramount Skydance until January 2023.

In September 2021, Bardel appointed Tina Chow as CEO and Richard Grieve as COO.

Logo used until 2022

== Filmography ==
=== Television ===
| Show | Year(s) | Co-production(s) | Note |
|---|---|---|---|
| Potato Head Kids | 1987 | | Episodes 16–23 |
| Captain N: The Game Master | 1989–1991 | DIC Entertainment | |
| Chip 'n Dale: Rescue Rangers | 1989 | Walt Disney Television | |
| The Raccoons | 1990 | Gillis-Wiseman Productions; Evergreen Raccoons Television Productions | "Black Belt Bentley!" (camera, xeroxing, and opaquing) |
| The Ren & Stimpy Show | 1990 | Nickelodeon | "Big House Blues” (ink and paint) |
| Britannica's Tales Around the World | 1991 | Encyclopædia Britannica | "The Maiden, the Frog, and the Chief's Son" (xeroxing} |
| Fish Police | 1992 | Hanna-Barbera | |
| Fievel's American Tails | 1992 | Universal Cartoon Studios; Nelvana | additional production facility |
| Super Dave: Daredevil for Hire | 1992–1993 | DIC Entertainment | |
| Stunt Dawgs | 1992–1993 | DIC Entertainment | |
| The Pink Panther | 1993 | Metro-Goldwyn-Mayer Animation | additional pre-production |
| Tales from the Cryptkeeper | 1993–1994 | Nelvana | production facility |
| Dog City | 1993 | The Jim Henson Company; Nelvana | additional production facility |
| Street Sharks | 1994–1997 | DIC Entertainment | |
| Problem Child | 1994 | Universal Cartoon Studios | storyboards (season 2) |
| The Magic School Bus | 1994–1997 | Scholastic; Nelvana | pre-production |
| Phantom 2040 | 1994–1996 | Hearst Entertainment | pre-production |
| Where on Earth Is Carmen Sandiego? | 1994–1999 | DIC Entertainment | |
| Magic Adventures of Mumfie | 1994–1995 | The Britt Allcroft Company | additional animation (season 1) |
| Aaahh!!! Real Monsters | 1995–1997 | Klasky Csupo; Nickelodeon Animation Studio | storyboards |
| Gadget Boy & Heather | 1995 | DIC Entertainment | storyboards |
| Little Bear | 1995 | Nelvana | |
| The Savage Dragon | 1995 | Universal Cartoon Studios | |
| What-a-Mess | 1995 | DIC Entertainment | |
| Stickin' Around | 1996–1997 | Nelvana | storyboards (season 1), animation (season 2) |
| Flash Gordon | 1996–1997 | Hearst Entertainment | storyboards and sheet direction |
| The Magical Adventures of Quasimodo | 1996 | Hearst Entertainment | pre-production |
| The Oz Kids | 1996 | Hyperion Pictures | storyboards |
| Bruno the Kid | 1996–1997 | Film Roman | pre-production |
| Jumanji: The Series | 1996–1999 | Adelaide Productions | pre-production |
| Project G.e.e.K.e.R. | 1996 | Adelaide Productions | pre-production |
| The Mouse and the Monster | 1996 | Saban Entertainment | ink and paint |
| The Prince of Atlantis | 1997 | Ravensburger Film + TV | pre-production |
| Ivanhoe the King's Knight | 1997 | CINAR | pre-production |
| Rugrats | 1997 | Klasky Csupo; Nickelodeon Animation Studio | storyboards |
| Cartoon Sushi | 1997 | MTV Animation | "Howl", ink and paint on "Man's Best Friend" |
| Flying Rhino Junior High | 1998–2000 | Nelvana | additional production facility |
| George and Martha | 1999–2000 | Nelvana | additional production facility |
| Milo's Bug Quest | 2000 | Sunwoo Entertainment | pre-production |
| Marsupilami | 2000 | Marathon Productions; Marsu Productions | storyboards |
| Harvey Birdman, Attorney at Law | 2000 | Williams Street | additional animation services |
| Zoog Disney | 2000–2002 | Disney Channel | |
| Bob and Margaret | 2001 | Nelvana | Season 3 |
| Seven Little Monsters | 2001–2002 | Nelvana | additional production facility |
| ¡Mucha Lucha! | 2002–2005 | Warner Bros. Animation | |
| Silverwing | 2003 | Philippine Animation Studio | |
| The Buzz on Maggie | 2005 | Walt Disney Television Animation | |
| El Tigre: The Adventures of Manny Rivera | 2006 | Nickelodeon Animation Studio | pilot |
| Viva Piñata | 2006–2009 | 4Kids Entertainment | |
| Wow! Wow! Wubbzy! | 2006–2010 | Bolder Media; Starz Media | |
| Where My Dogs At? | 2006 | MTV Animation; 6 Point Harness | |
| Chaotic | 2006–2008 | 4Kids Entertainment | season 1 |
| WordWorld | 2007–2008 | WTTW Chicago | season 1 |
| Edgar & Ellen | 2007–2008 | Star Farm Productions | |
| Zeke's Pad | 2008–2010 | Leaping Lizard Productions; Avrill Stark Entertainment; Flying Bark Productions | |
| Pearlie | 2009–2010 | Nelvana | |
| Neighbors from Hell | 2010 | MoonBoy Animation | |
| Planet Sheen | 2010–2011 | Nickelodeon Animation Studio | additional animation |
| Fanboy & Chum Chum | 2011–2012 | Frederator Studios; Nickelodeon Animation Studio | season 2 |
| Bob's Burgers | 2011 | Bento Box Entertainment | season 1 |
| Teenage Mutant Ninja Turtles | 2012–2017 | Nickelodeon Animation Studio; LowBar Productions | |
| Monsters vs. Aliens | 2013–2014 | DreamWorks Animation; Nickelodeon Animation Studio | |
| Teen Titans Go! | 2013–present | Warner Bros. Animation | |
| Mother Up! | 2013–14 | Breakthrough Entertainment | |
| Rick and Morty | 2013–2025 | Williams Street | animation (seasons 1–8) |
| VeggieTales in the House | 2014–2016 | DreamWorks Animation Television | |
| All Hail King Julien | 2014–2017 | DreamWorks Animation Television | |
| The Adventures of Puss in Boots | 2015–2018 | DreamWorks Animation Television | |
| The Simpsons | 2015 | 20th Television Animation | "Mathlete's Feat" (couch gag) |
| Captain Jake and the Never Land Pirates | 2015–2016 | Disney Television Animation | season 4 |
| Dinotrux | 2015–2018 | DreamWorks Animation Television | |
| DC Super Hero Girls | 2015–2018 | Warner Bros. Animation | |
| Dawn of the Croods | 2015 | DreamWorks Animation Television | "The Mean Warts", "School of Hard Rocks", "Garden of Eaten" |
| Mack & Moxy | 2016 | Georgia Public Broadcasting | |
| HarmonQuest | 2016–2019 | Starburns Industries; Universal Content Productions | |
| VeggieTales in the City | 2017 | DreamWorks Animation Television | |
| Angry Birds Blues | 2017 | Rovio Entertainment | |
| Furze World Wonders | 2017 | YouTube | |
| 44 Cats | 2018–2021 | Rainbow | |
| The Dragon Prince | 2018–2024 | Wonderstorm | |
| Rainbow Butterfly Unicorn Kitty | 2019 | Funrise | |
| DreamWorks Dragons: Rescue Riders | 2019–2022 | DreamWorks Animation Television | |
| Solar Opposites | 2020–2022 | 20th Television Animation | Seasons 1–3 |
| Gen:Lock | 2021 | Rooster Teeth Studios | co-animation; Season 2 |
| SuperKitties | 2023 | Sony Pictures Television Kids | co-animation; Season 1 only |
| Carol & The End of The World | 2023 | Netflix Animation | original Netflix miniseries |
| Sausage Party: Foodtopia | 2024–2025 | Sony Pictures Television; Amazon MGM Studios; Annapurna Television; Point Grey Pictures | co-animation |
| Mermaid Magic | 2024-present | Rainbow | animation |
| Magic: The Gathering | TBA | Netflix Animation; Hasbro Entertainment; Wizards of the Coast | |
| Moon Lake | TBA | Heavy Metal Studios | |
| Grounded | TBA | Xbox Game Studios | |

=== Film ===
| Show | Year(s) | Co-production(s) | Notes |
|---|---|---|---|
| The Nutcracker Prince | 1990 | Lacewood Productions | additional opaquing services |
| Rover Dangerfield | 1991 | Hyperion Pictures | additional animation services |
| Adventures in Dinosaur City | 1991 | Smart Egg Pictures | ink and paint |
| Bebe's Kids | 1992 | Hyperion Pictures | additional animation services |
| The New Adventures of Little Toot | 1992 | Strand Home Video | pre-production art services |
| Once Upon a Forest | 1993 | Hanna-Barbera | animation |
| Balto | 1995 | Amblimation | animation, uncredited |
| Space Jam | 1996 | Warner Bros. Animation | animation |
| Anastasia | 1997 | Fox Animation Studios | animation |
| The Prince of Egypt | 1998 | DreamWorks Animation | animation services |
| The Road to El Dorado | 2000 | DreamWorks Animation | additional final line services and special effects |
| Joseph: King of Dreams | 2000 | DreamWorks Animation | animation |
| Titan A.E. | 2000 | Fox Animation Studios | animation, uncredited |
| Marco Polo: Return to Xanadu | 2001 | The Tooniversal Company | additional animation production |
| Spirit: Stallion of the Cimarron | 2002 | DreamWorks Animation | additional final line services |
| Eight Crazy Nights | 2002 | Columbia Pictures | additional animation |
| Sinbad: Legend of the Seven Seas | 2003 | DreamWorks Animation | additional final line services |
| Dragons: Fire and Ice | 2004 | Mega Bloks | animation |
| ¡Mucha Lucha!: The Return of El Maléfico | 2005 | Warner Bros. Animation | additional animation |
| Dragons II: The Metal Ages | 2005 | Mega Bloks | animation |
| Happily N'Ever After | 2006 | Vanguard Animation | additional animation |
| Wubbzy's Big Movie! | 2008 | Starz Media | additional animation |
| The Prophet | 2014 | Participant Media | CGI animation |
| Shaun the Sheep: The Farmer's Llamas | 2015 | Aardman Animations | animation production |
| Albert | 2016 | Nickelodeon Animation Studio | animation |
| Lucky | 2019 | Nickelodeon Animation Studio | animation |
| Diary of a Wimpy Kid | 2021 | Walt Disney Pictures; 20th Century Studios | animation |
| The Ice Age Adventures of Buck Wild | 2022 | Walt Disney Pictures; 20th Century Studios; 20th Century Animation | animation |
| Diary of a Wimpy Kid: Rodrick Rules | 2022 | Walt Disney Pictures; 20th Century Studios | animation |
| Diary of a Wimpy Kid Christmas: Cabin Fever | 2023 | Walt Disney Pictures; 20th Century Studios | animation |
| Diary of a Wimpy Kid: The Last Straw | 2025 | Walt Disney Pictures; 20th Century Studios | animation |
| Diary of a Wimpy Kid Christmas: The Getaway | 2026 | Walt Disney Pictures; 20th Century Studios | animation |
| Ice Age: Boiling Point | 2027 | 20th Century Studios; 20th Century Animation | animation |

=== Other ===
| Show | Year(s) | Co-production(s) | Notes |
|---|---|---|---|
| Somewhere in the Arctic... | 1987 | CalArts | ink and paint |
| Lea Press on Limbs | 1988 | | production services |
| The Thing What Lurked in the Tub | 1988 | | ink and paint |
| Black Hula | 1988 | International Rocketship | trace and paint |
| Palm Springs | 1989 | CalArts | ink and paint |
| Dogpile | 1991 | CalArts | ink and paint |
| The Wish That Changed Christmas | 1991 | McDonald's | assistant animation |
| Whoopass Stew! | 1992 | CalArts | ink and paint |
| Performance Art: Starring Chainsaw Bob | 1992 | | ink and paint |
| Thanks for the Mammaries | 1992 | CalArts | ink and paint |
| Bulimiator | 1992 | CalArts | ink and paint |
| Itsy Bitsy Spider | 1992 | Hyperion Pictures | additional animation services |
| Mirabelle and Me | 1994 | Nelvana; Tiger Electronics | key animation |
| Wanna Be a Dino Finder | 1995 | Cloud 9 Interactive | video game; animation |
| But Where Does It Come From? | 1996 | Playhouse Pictures | |
| Gregory and Me | 1996 | Kideo | |
| The Fennels Figure Math | 1996 | McGraw Hill Home Interactive | video game; animation |
| My Party with Barney | 1998 | Kideo | animation |
| Disney's Winnie the Pooh: Kindergarten | 2000 | Disney Interactive | video game; animation |
| The Christmas Orange | 2002 | | |
| Def Jam Vendetta | 2003 | EA Canada | video game; additional animation |
| SuperFuckers | 2012–2013 | Frederator Studios | |
| Nickelodeon Animated Shorts Program | 2013–2016 | Nickelodeon | "Earmouse and Bottle", "Space Mission: Danger" |
| Rick and Morty: Rick and Morty Exquisite Corpse | 2017 | Titmouse, Inc. Williams Street | |
| Monster High: Adventures of the Ghoul Squad | 2017 | Mattel Creations | |
