= Thanks to the Hard Work of the Elephants =

- Directed by: Bryce Hodgson
- Written by: Bryce Hodgson
- Produced by: Caitlyn Sponheimer; Katia Shannon
- Starring: Hunter Dillon; Kevin Nguyen; Tony Nappo
- Cinematography: Robert Mentov
- Edited by: Bryce Hodgson; Ian Christison
- Music by: Lou Tides
- Production companies: CouKuma Productions; Harrington Studio
- Release date: October 4, 2025 (VIFF)
- Running time: 91 minutes
- Country: Canada
- Language: English

Thanks to the Hard Work of the Elephants is a Canadian drama film, written and directed by Bryce Hodgson and released in 2025. The film stars Hunter Dillon and Kevin Nguyen as Alex and Trevor, two troubled teens who escape from a youth detention centre while high on LSD, and then steal a van and set off on a road trip with the goal of setting up their own alternative youth commune in the forest.

The cast also includes Tony Nappo, Elizabeth Saunders, Ryan McDonald, Fred Nguyen Khan, Kimberly Ha and Jasmine Kar in supporting roles.

== Production ==
The film, Hodgson's directorial debut, entered production in 2023, with shooting in and around Toronto, Ontario.

== Distribution ==
The film received a private industry screening in the Locarno Pro program at the 78th Locarno Film Festival in August 2025, where it won the Music Library &SFX/Acorde Award granting it €45,000 in music supervision services.

It had its official world premiere at the 2025 Vancouver International Film Festival.
