= Rick Carton =

American artist (born 1950)

Rick Carton (November 6, 1967–2017) was an American artist of the Edgar & Ellen book series, and co-founder of Star Farm Productions, a children's entertainment company. He lived in Chicago, Illinois, U.S.

Carton had a passion for art and drawing since early childhood. His art for Edgar & Ellen comprises dark sketches with apparent homages to Edgar Allan Poe. He also provided the basis for all art used in the Edgar & Ellen cartoon shorts broadcast on NickToons Network.

== Bibliography ==
Carton's books include:

- Rare Beasts (2003), ISBN 1-58246-110-4
- Tourist Trap (2004), ISBN 1-58246-111-2
- Under Town (2004), ISBN 1-58246-126-0
- Pet's Revenge (2006), ISBN 1-4169-1408-0
