= Edgar & Ellen =

Children's books and animated TV series

- Book 1, Rare Beasts
- Author: Charles Ogden
- Illustrator: Rick Carton
- Language: English
- Genre: Adventure fiction
- Publisher: Simon & Schuster
- Publication date: 2003–2009
- Publication place: United States

Edgar & Ellen is a book series written by Charles Ogden, illustrated by Rick Carton and published by Simon & Schuster. It tells the story twelve-year-old orphaned twins who cause mischief and mayhem in their sickly sweet town, Nod's Limbs. The series currently contains nine books in addition to some side material. The twins' names are derived from American author and poet Edgar Allan Poe. Rare Beasts is the first book, followed by Tourist Trap, Under Town, Pet's Revenge, High Wire and Nod's Limbs, with a sequel series premiering just a year later, currently consisting of Hot Air, Frost Bites and Split Ends. The Mischief Manual, a book written in the voice of the twins themselves, hit the shelves in June 2007. A series of animated shorts premiered in 2006 and a weekly TV series premiered October 7, 2007 both on Nicktoons.

Edgar and Ellen live in a 13-story mansion on the edge of Nod's Limbs. Ellen is supposedly the older of the twins by two minutes and 13 seconds. They live with a hairy creature whom they refer to as Pet — a hairball with an eyeball. Their groundskeeper and caretaker, Heimertz, lives in a small shack just outside the house. Their mansion is located near a now disassembled junkyard, which the twins had lovingly dubbed their "Gadget Graveyard". They take parts from it and create marvelous contraptions for trouble.

Both of the twins wear striped footie pajamas and prank each other all day long—when they are not pranking the goody-goody townspeople of Nod's Limbs. They are clever, fearless, mischievous and creative. So creative, in fact, that their pranks often backfire hilariously.

== Books ==
- Rare Beasts (2003) ISBN 1-58246-110-4
- Tourist Trap (2004) ISBN 1-58246-111-2
- Under Town (2004) ISBN 1-58246-126-0
- Pet's Revenge (2006) ISBN 1-4169-1408-0
- High Wire (2006) ISBN 1-4169-1500-1
- Nod's Limbs (2007) ISBN 1-4169-1501-X
- Mischief Manual (2007) ISBN 1-4169-3935-0
- Hair 'Em Scare 'Em: A Pop-Up Misadventure (2007)
- Hot Air (2008) ISBN 1-4169-3935-0
- Frost Bites (2008) ISBN 978-1-4169-5464-4
- Split Ends (2009) ISBN 978-1-4169-5466-8
- Graphic Novelty: A Comic Collection (2009)

Books are published by Simon & Schuster in the United States, Canada, and the UK. Internationally books are published by Hachette Children's Book Australia, Pocket Jeunesse (France), Grupo SM in Spain and Editora Rocco in Brazil, among others.

=== Series one ===
==== Rare Beasts ====
In Rare Beasts, the twins realize wreaking havoc can incur expenses, so they come up with a unique fundraising scheme: they'll nab the pets of Nod's Limbs and sell them as exotic animals for big bucks. But things don't go as planned when a purloined python gets hungry.

==== Tourist Trap ====
Mayor Knightleigh plans to destroy the gadget graveyard in order to build his own fancy hotel, using a group of celebrities to sponsor it. The twins manage to steal Stephanie Knightleigh's position as tour guide, taking the celebrities for a ghastly tour. The twins manage to sabotage the world's largest French toast festival, seemingly crushing Knightleigh's plans. They then find out that one tourist, Alex Sai, wrote a positive review on Nod's Limbs tourism.

==== Under Town ====
In Under Town, someone is tormenting the fine people of Nod's Limbs...and for once, it's not Edgar and Ellen. A new prankster is one step ahead of the twins, making mischief all over town. To discover the identity of this daring new foe, Edgar and Ellen must descend under town to stop this rash of copycat capers once and for all.

==== Pet's Revenge ====
In Pet's Revenge, Edgar has to plot solo when Ellen suddenly turns into a model of proper behavior. She (voluntarily) takes a bath and even accepts an invitation to a slumber party. Surely she's got a scheme up her (unusually clean) sleeve. Or has a hairy traitor managed to break up the devious duo...

==== High Wire ====
The twins' groundskeeper, Heimertz, has a dark and secret past shrouded in... the Big Top. When the circus comes to Nod's Limbs, everyone, especially Edgar and Ellen, gets their money's worth.

==== Nod's Limbs ====
The legend of Nod's missing golden limbs resurfaces, and a town-wide search commences. The entire town becomes obsessed with a treasure hunt that leads to the twins' turf, and the intruders dig out a collapsed cave to discover something far more shocking than gold.

=== Series two ===
==== Hot Air ====
A few months after the disgrace of the Knightleighs and Augustus Nod's return from the dead, Edgar and Ellen are living as town heroes. But their easy life is threatened when an old nemesis returns, and to make matters more complicated, the first Knightleigh-less mayoral election is coming up.

==== Frost Bites ====
The twins' pursuit of Stephanie Knightleigh leads them to Frøsthaven, an Arctic village whose cheerful citizens and strange customs remind them of home. What makes this place a sugary sweet duplicate of Nod's Limbs? The secret, alas, is upon the forbidden slopes of the Glöggenheim, where dwells something that doesn't take kindly to being disturbed.

==== Split Ends ====
In order to thwart Stephanie's scheme, the twins must separate for the first time in their lives. Edgar's pursuit of the Midway Irregulars leads him to the forests of Cougar Falls and an unlikely partnership with an eccentric professional monster hunter, while Ellen and Pet find themselves in the decidedly inhospitable town of Lach Lufless.

=== Other books ===
==== Mischief Manual ====
The Mischief Manual is Edgar and Ellen's first chance to write a book in their own voice, "out from under the thumb of Charles Ogden". In this book, the twins share their trade secrets and inspirations for all manner of misdeeds and mayhem, including skill-building exercises, sample blueprints, and schemes to try at their home.

=== Setting ===
Nod's Limbs is the town where Edgar and Ellen live. It is so sickeningly sweet that it makes one's teeth hurt. There is no originality to the people that live there — which is why Edgar and Ellen are such a foil for them. The twins attempt to liven up shiny that one just wants to throw mud at it just to mix things up a bit. Living in it is, in the twins' own words, "like living inside a sugar cube".

== Animated shorts ==
The animated shorts were co-produced with Canada-based Bardel Entertainment in association with YTV and Nicktoons Network. Nicktoons Network aired Edgar & Ellen two-minute shorts every day. There were 13 shorts in total. Six holiday specials began airing on Nicktoons Network on Labor Day weekend in 2006. The Back-to-School special, "Accept No Substitutes", was followed by a Halloween special, "Trick or Twins", a winter special, "Cold Medalists", a Valentine's special entitled "Crushed", and an April Fool's special "Nobody's Fools". The most recent one, called "Frog Days of Summer", aired on September 3, 2007.

The animated shorts mainly show the pranking activities of Edgar and Ellen, but also include supporting characters like Mayor Knightleigh, Bob the Intern, Pet, Buffy the Muffin lady, and several other entertaining Nod's Limbsians.

Edgar and Ellen hosted the Scare-a-thon on Nicktoons Network during Halloween weekend of 2005 and did so again in 2006.

== TV series ==
Edgar & Ellen
- Created by: Charles Ogden; Rick Carton
- Written by: Adam Beechen; Scott Gray; Steven Kriozere; Guy Toubes
- Directed by: Keith Ingham; Larry Hall
- Starring: Kathleen Barr; Jillian Michaels; Ashleigh Ball; Richard Newman; Lee Tockar; Michael Donovan; Ian James Corlett; Adam Behr; Jan Rabson; Michael Dobson
- Composers: Michael Richard Plowman; Hal Beckett
- Countries of origin: United States; Canada
- Original language: English
- No. of seasons: 1
- No. of episodes: 26

Production
- Executive producers: Delna Bhesania; Barbara Ferro; Trish Lindsay; Barry Ward
- Producers: Brian Behling; Kathy Antonsen Rocchio
- Running time: 30 minutes
- Production companies: Studio B Productions (uncredited); Bardel Entertainment; Star Farm Productions; Nicktoons Network Original Productions

Original release
- Network: YTV (Canada); Nicktoons Network (US)
- Release: October 7, 2007 – October 31, 2008

The television series premiered on Nicktoons Network on October 7, 2007 and concluded on October 31, 2008, airing every Sunday at 5pm, 8pm and 4-5am Pacific. Reruns continued until April 6, 2010. In Canada, the show aired on YTV and also premiered on Nicktoons in the UK around October 22, 2007.

The series has only been given two DVD releases. An exclusive DVD from Target that included the holiday specials "Trick or Twins" and "Cold Medalists" as well as another DVD titled "Mad Scientists" that included 13 episodes from the series. The rest of the series has yet to see any official release.

=== Episodes ===
No.	Title	Original release date
1	"It Came from the Sub-Basement / Beast of Show / Edgar's Satchel: Getting Antsy"	October 7, 2007
Edgar and Ellen find a gigantic spider living in their sub-basement. Although they get rid of it, swarms of other bugs attack them. / The twins enter Pet into a dog competition, determined to beat Stephanie and her poodle. / A viewer dares Edgar to prank someone using shaving cream, fire ants and toothpaste. Edgar targets the Mayor, but he's not the only target.
2	"Gross Inspection / Bolty, the Friendly Robot / Ellen's Horrorscopes: Them Bones"	October 7, 2007
Stephanie tries to get a safety inspector to condemn the twins' house, regarding it as dangerous. How far will Edgar and Ellen go to save their home? / Edgar invents a robot to do evil deeds but instead the robot is obsessed with cleaning. The twins will have to stop it from ruining their favorite spot, Gadget Graveyard. / Ellen reads chicken bones and tells the Mayor he'll be going on a trip soon.
3	"Trickery Dickery Clock / Dr. Edgar and Dr. Ellen / The Secret Life of Pet: Viva Pet!"	October 14, 2007
Edgar invents a remote that controls time. / A group of new-age people camp out on Edgar and Ellen's lawn. / Pet dreams that he is a hero.
4	"Picture Imperfect / Pasta Their Prime / Nod's Limbs' Public Access: Stephanie's "How to Be Like Me""	October 14, 2007
A film crew wants to shoot a horror film at the mansion. / The twins conspire to keep a restaurant from cooking the world's longest linguine noodle, but their plan soon backfires. / Stephanie hosts a cable show, and the twins sabotage it by making her look ugly during a makeover.
5	"Commander in Stripes / Ellen vs. Slug / The All-Knowing Head of Poe: An Eggcellent Question"	October 21, 2007
Ellen becomes student body president after a prank gone wrong, turns out to be quite a tyrant and Edgar and Stephanie will have to work together in order for Ellen to stop being crazy over power. / Ellen battles a destructive slug in her garden, refusing Edgar's help. / Pet takes the twins back in time.
6	"For Art's Sake / The Game's Afootie / Heimertz's Family Album: His First Accordion"	October 21, 2007
Ellen's prank is mistaken as a piece of art by the school's art teacher, so she becomes a star in the school. / The twins challenge each other in a game seeing who can prank the most people in Nod's Limbs. / Heimertz is part of a circus act.
7	"To the Moon / A Midsummer's Nightmare / Heimertz's Family Album: The Mustache"	October 28, 2007
The twins act like they are space recruiters. / Stephanie tries to embarrass Ellen. / Heirmertz is teased for not having his mustache in a family picture.
8	"Scam Artist Shuffle / Bob's Limbs / The Secret Life of Pet: Trip to Atlantis"	November 4, 2007
Scam artists come to Nod's Limbs and play by their own rules. / Edgar and Ellen enter a "mayor for a day" contest. / Pet goes down the drain.
9	"Bon Voyage, Stephanie / Prankly Speaking / The All-Knowing Head of Poe: Star Crazy"	November 11, 2007
Edgar and Ellen get Stephanie banished to a boarding school but soon realize that pranking is no fun with her gone. / Edgar and Ellen prank each other so they can win a contest. / Poe explains how stars stay in the sky.
10	"Twinvasion / Here, Kitty, Kitty, Kitty / Ellen's Horrorocopes: Feet of Fate"	November 27, 2007
Edgar and Ellen plan a fake alien invasion. / Edgar and Ellen get a cat which replaces Pet. / Ellen predicts Stephanie's future by reading her feet.
11	"Prankster Wannabe / Satchel Bandits / Edgar's Satchel: Lepre-Conned"	February 3, 2008
A boy called Irwin tries to become a prankster. / Edgar and Ellen must find Edgar's satchel after it is stolen. / Edgar meets a mischievous leprechaun.
12	"Rare Birds Fiends / Prank Insurance / The All-Knowing Head of Poe: Sisters"	February 10, 2008
Edgar acts like a rare bird. / Edgar and Ellen sell prank insurance to the town. / Poe gets a sister.
13	"Little Stephanie Nightingale / Off the Deep End / Edgar's Satchel: Melon-Go-Round"	February 24, 2008
Stephanie hurts Ellen. / The twins try to ruin a swimming demonstration. / Edgar shoots watermelons.
14	"The Amazing Edgarini / Wax Removal / The Secret Life of Pet: Hard-Boiled Pet"	April 6, 2008
Edgar becomes popular because of escaping handcuffs. / Edgar and Ellen steal a wax statue of Stephanie / Pet acts like a detective after Edgar's prank is ruined.
15	"Grownups Behaving Badly / The Eyes Have It / The Secret Life of Pet: Alien Absucktion"	April 13, 2008
Edgar and Ellen rewrite Judith's newest parenting guide. / Ellen loses her eyesight after a prank goes wrong. / Pet gets stuck in a vacuum.
16	"It's a Mad, Mad, Mad, Mad Scientist / Long-Term Parking / Ellen's Horrorscopes: The New Look"	April 20, 2008
Edgar clones himself. / Edgar creates a scientific golf club. / Ellen helps one of Stephanie's friends with love advice.
17	"Pranker's Block / The Barracuda Whisperer / The Secret Life of Pet: Dogfight"	April 27, 2008
Edgar is in a pranker's block. / The twins help Miles Knightleigh stop his stardom. / Pet thinks about what it would be like if he were a World War I fighter pilot.
18	"Parents' Night / Pet in Love / The All-Knowing Head of Poe: Sweet on You"	July 28, 2008
Principal Mulberry wants to see Edgar and Ellen's parental figure: Heimertz. / Pet loses a mop he was wooing, and the twins try to track it down. / Poe investigates the identity of a viewer's crush and find out it is someone closer to them than they think.
19	"When You Wish Upon a Well / Baby Talk / Nod's Limbs' Public Address: Pet-o-Matic"	July 29, 2008
A wishing well grants everyone's wishes. / Ellen turns Edgar into a baby again. / Pet is a cleaning product.
20	"The Manners Marathon / Ellen's Secret Admirer / Ellen's Horrorscopes: Thanks for Muffin"	July 30, 2008
Edgar and Ellen enter the Manner's Marathon contest. / Ellen discovers someone has a crush on her. / Ellen predicts a bad future for Buffy's muffins.
21	"Viva La Trash / The Expert / Heimertz's Family Album: Something's Fishy"	July 31, 2008
Stephanie tries to destroy the Gadget Graveyard. / Stephanie hires a prank expert to deal with Edgar and Ellen. / Heimertz crushes on a mermaid.
22	"Suspect Inspection / Radio Free Nod's Limbs / Nod's Limbs' Public Access: Edgar's House of Whatcha"	August 1, 2008
Edgar's cold stops him from pranking. / Ellen becomes a DJ. / Pet meets a sewer monster.
23	"Signed, Sealed, Delivered / Study Time / Edgar's Satchel: Buzz Off"	October 30, 2008
One of the twins' pranks gets the mailman fired. / Edgar and Ellen compete against another set of twins for entry to the Twinstitute. / Edgar puts a zombie and a beehive into a port-o-potty.
24	"Nod's Limbs Finest / Nuggets of Stupidity / The Secret Life of Pet: Hang Tendril"	October 30, 2008
The twins ride along with the police. / Edgar and Ellen think they find gold on their property. / Pet is flushed down the toilet.
25	"Doomsday Parade / Flown for a Loop / Heimertz's Family Album: Belly of the Beast"	October 31, 2008
26	"The Battle of Nod's Limbs / Attack of the Invisible Pet / Nod's Limbs' Public Access: Miles' Mild"	October 31, 2008

== Target stores ==
To promote Halloween in 2007, Target created a section in their stores with a haunted house façade featuring moving likenesses of the two, giant pictures of Edgar and Ellen, and branded and licensed products featuring them. They also featured prominently in-store displays.

Target also sold for Halloween an Edgar & Ellen DVD, which contains the episodes "Trick or Twins" and "Cold Medalists".

== Del Taco ==
For the Halloween season of 2008, Del Taco promoted Edgar & Ellen in over 500 stores throughout the western United States.
