= Erica Cerra =

Canadian actress (born 1979)

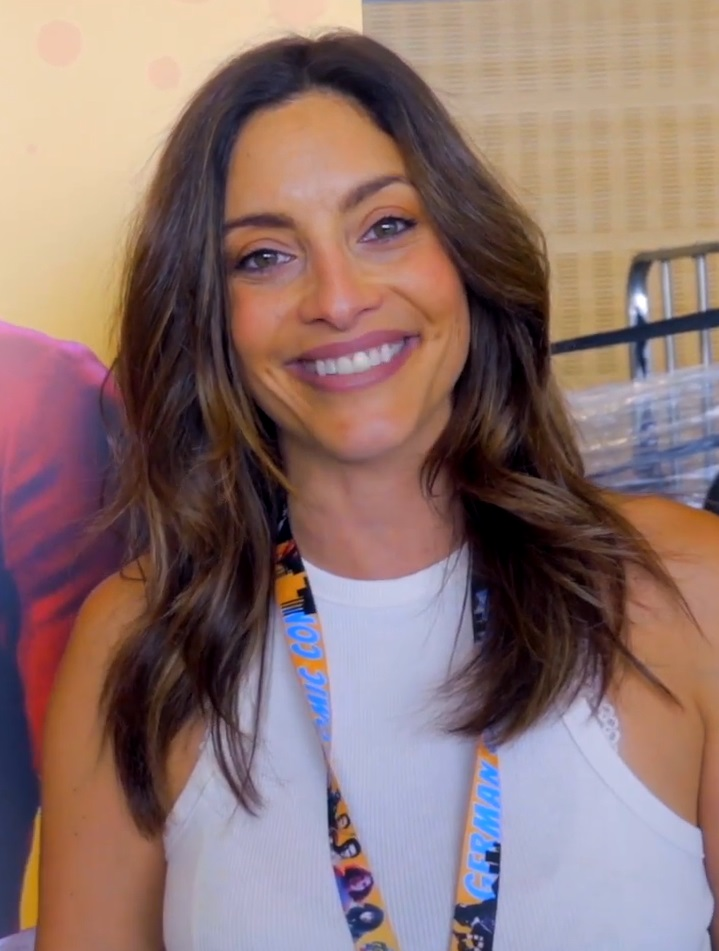
- Cerra at the German Comic Con 2022
- Born: October 31, 1979 (age 47); Vancouver, British Columbia, Canada
- Occupation: Actress
- Years active: 1994–present
- Spouse: Raffaele Fiore (m. 2010)
- Children: 1

Erica Cerra (born October 31, 1979) is a Canadian actress. She is most notable for her portrayal of Deputy Jo Lupo in the Syfy series Eureka (2006-2012), and artificial intelligence A.L.I.E. and her creator Becca in CW series The 100 (2015-2020).

Her other credits include roles in Special Unit 2 (2001), Dead Like Me (2003), The L Word (2004), Blade:Trinity (2004), The Collector (2004), The Dead Zone (2004), Huff (2004), Cold Squad (2005), Smallville (2005), The 4400 (2005), Battlestar Galactica (2006), Man About Town (2006), Reaper (2008), Warehouse 13 (2009), Sanctuary (2009), Supernatural (2011), Motive (2014), Rush (2014), and iZombie (2015).

== Career ==
Cerra was born in Vancouver, British Columbia. She is of Italian descent. She started by acting from an early age, around 6 or 7 years of age, first appearing in the Canadian show KidZone, then in numerous commercials as a child. She took a short break from acting, in her teens, to relieve the responsibility of being educated on set.

Between 2001 and 2006, Cerra had guest roles in Battlestar Galactica (2006), The L Word (2004), and Smallville (2005). Her other roles included parts in The 4400 (2005), The Dead Zone (2004), Reaper (2008), Huff (2204), and Dead Like Me (2003), and the Canadian police procedural Cold Squad (2005), the monster-hunting action series Special Unit 2 (2001), and the supernatural thriller series The Collector (2004). She also appeared in major cinematic movie releases Man About Town (2006), with Ben Affleck and Rebecca Romijn, and with Wesley Snipes in Blade:Trinity (2004).

In 2006, she starred in the music video for the Michael Bublé song "Save the Last Dance for Me". That year also saw her land her most successful role to date, when she was cast as Deputy Jo Lupo in Syfy series Eureka from 2006-2012.

She appeared in Warehouse 13, Sanctuary (2009), Supernatural (2011), and Motive (2014). She had a recurring role in the 2014 USA Network series Rush (2014), and appeared in the CW series iZombie (2015).

Erica appeared in the second season finale of the CW series The 100 (2015-2020), which aired on March 11, 2015, as a mysterious A.I. called A.L.I.E. She played the main antagonist during the third season, and reprised the role in an episode of the fourth season. Cerra also played Becca, the creator of A.L.I.E., in a flashback storyline.

== Personal life ==
Cerra married Raffaele Fiore in November 2010. Cerra gave birth to the couple's first child, a daughter, in May 2012.

== Filmography ==
=== Film ===
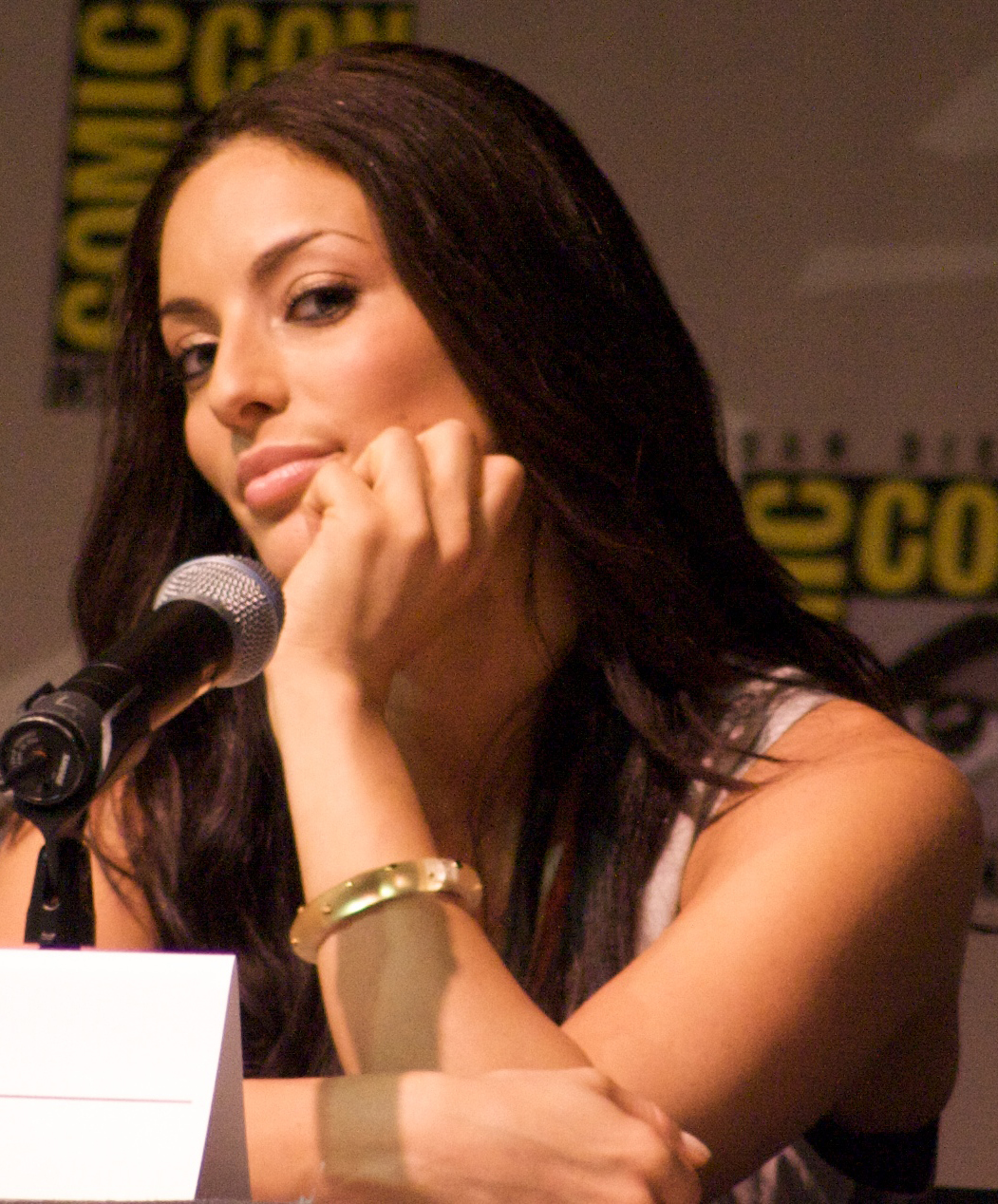
Cerra at the 2009 San Diego Comic-Con

Year	Title	Role	Notes
2004	Adam and Evil	Yvonne	
2004	Blade: Trinity	Goth Vixen Wannabe	
2006	Man About Town	Sela	
2010	Percy Jackson & the Olympians: The Lightning Thief	Hera	
2010	The Stranger	Grace Bishop	Direct-to-video film
2011	Mega Cyclone	Carolyn	Television film
2011	Rise of the Damned	Brit	
2015	Shark Killer	Jasmine	
2017	Power Rangers	Mrs. Kwan	
2019	The Intruder	Jillian Richards	
2021	Diary of a Wimpy Kid	Susan Heffley	Voice role
2022	Diary of a Wimpy Kid: Rodrick Rules	Susan Heffley	Voice role
2023	Diary of a Wimpy Kid Christmas: Cabin Fever	Susan Heffley	Voice role
2025	Diary of a Wimpy Kid: The Last Straw	Susan Heffley	Voice role
2026	Diary of a Wimpy Kid Christmas: The Getaway	Susan Heffley	Voice role

=== Television ===
Year	Title	Role	Notes
1994	No Adults Allowed	Molly	
2001	Special Unit 2	Pretty girl	Episode: "The Rocks"
2003	Black Sash	Driver	Episode: "Date Night"
2003	Dead Like Me	M.J. Bowers' sister	Episode: "Reaping Havoc"
2003	Jake 2.0	Sam	Episode: "Last Man Standing"
2004	Naughty Bits	Performer	Episode: "The Eyes"
2004	The L Word	Dancer	Episode: "L'Ennui"
2004	The Collector	Vonnie	Episode: "The Supermodel"
2004	The Dead Zone	Eager student	Episode: "Instinct"
2004	Huff	Beautiful waitress	Episode: "Pilot"
2005	Young Blades	Giselle	Episode: "Rub-a-Dub Sub"
2005	Smallville	Lex's aid	Episode: "Lucy"
2005	Cold Squad	Stephanie Johnston	Episode: "C'mon I Tip Waitresses"
2005	The 4400	Molly Caldicott	Episode: "Lockdown"
2005	Smallville	Sorority girl	Episode: "Thirst"
2006	The L Word	Uta Refson	2 episodes (season 3)
2006	Battlestar Galactica	Maya	4 episodes (seasons 2–3)
2006–2012	Eureka	Jo Lupo	Recurring role (seasons 1–2); main role (seasons 3–5)
2008	Reaper	Nicole Manders	Episode: "Acid Queen"
2009	Warehouse 13	Jillian Whitman	Episode: "Duped"
2009	Sanctuary	Emma Correia	Episode: "Veritas"
2010	Smallville	Adrianna Tomaz	Episode: "Isis"
2011	Supernatural	Robin	Episode: "The Man Who Knew Too Much"
2012	Mega Cyclone	Carolyn	Television film
2012	The Wishing Tree	Clarissa	Television film
2014	Motive	Diane Torrance	Episode: "Deception"
2014	Rush	Laurel Burke	Recurring role
2014	Package Deal	Emma	Episode: "Sex Sex Sex"
2015–2020	The 100	A.L.I.E. / Becca	Guest star (seasons 2, 5–7); recurring role (seasons 3–4)
2015	iZombie	Sasha Arconi	Episode: "Dead Air"
2015	Welcome Home	Cynthia	Television film
2017	Lucifer	Athena Burns	Episode: "Mr. & Mrs. Mazikeen Smith"
2017–2019	Supernatural	Duma	Recurring role (seasons 13–14)
2019	Deadly Class	Miss De Luca	Recurring role
2020	A Million Little Things	Tara Simone	1 episode (season 2)
2020–2021	The Astronauts	Connie Rivers	Recurring role; 10 episodes
2021-2023	Nancy Drew	D.A. Jean Rosario	1 episode (season 2); Recurring role (season 3)
2022	Family Law	Luisa	4 episodes (season 2)
2022	The Good Doctor	Amanda	Episode: "Cheat Day"
2023	Mystery on Mistletoe Lane	Heidi Wicks	Television film
2024	A Dance in the Snow	Melanie	Television film
2025	WildCards	Elena Ramos	2 Episodes "Clouds in my eyes" "Sunrise, Sunset"
2026	A Castle of Our Own	Marley	Television film

=== Web ===
Year	Title	Role	Notes
2006	Eureka: Hide and Seek	Jo Lupo	4 episodes
2011	Mortal Kombat: Legacy	Action Star	Episode: "Johnny Cage"
