= Chris Diamantopoulos =

Canadian actor (born 1975)

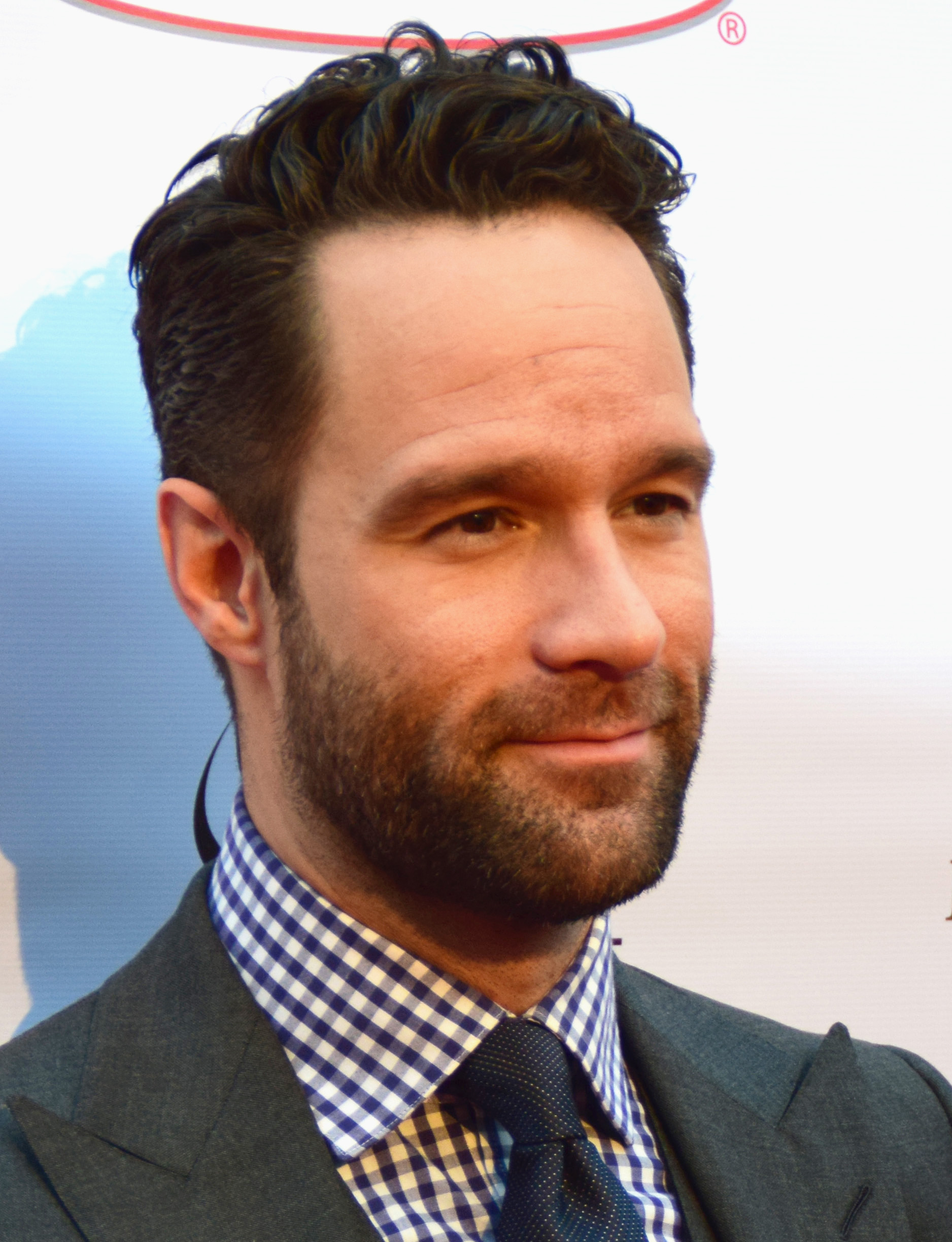
- Diamantopoulos in 2015
- Born: Christopher Diamantopoulos; May 9, 1975 (age 51); Toronto, Ontario, Canada
- Occupation: Actor
- Years active: 2000–present
- Spouse: Becki Newton (m. 2005)
- Children: 4

Christopher Diamantopoulos (Greek: Χριστόφορος Διαμαντόπουλος (Khristóforos Diamantópoulos); born May 9, 1975) is a Canadian actor. He played Russ Hanneman in the HBO series Silicon Valley and starred in the film The Three Stooges as Moe Howard, and the TV series Good Girls Revolt. He voiced Mickey Mouse in the eponymous television series, The Wonderful World of Mickey Mouse and the short film Once Upon a Studio; for the former, he received two Emmy Award nominations, and worked on multiple characters in the Prime Video animated series Invincible.

== Early life ==
Diamantopoulos was born on May 9, 1975, to Greek immigrant parents in Toronto, Ontario, Canada. He grew up splitting his time between Canada and Greece. His mother is from Ioannina and his father is from the Peloponnese. He is a practicing member of the Greek Orthodox Church, and a fluent Greek speaker.

== Career ==
Diamantopoulos began his career working in television commercials and professional theatre productions at the age of nine. At age eighteen, he left home to work in a series of American national tours. A short time later, he worked on Broadway, where he played leading parts in The Full Monty (2002) and Les Misérables (2003). Diamantopoulos attended East York Collegiate Institute.

He played Robin Williams in Behind the Camera: The Unauthorized Story of Mork & Mindy alongside Erinn Hayes. He has guest-starred in several series, including Kevin Hill, Charmed, The Sopranos, The Office, Nip/Tuck and Boston Legal. He played the interior decorator in the miniseries The Starter Wife.

He had a recurring role on State of Mind and guest-voiced on American Dad! in 2009.

On the eighth season of 24, he played Rob Weiss, U.S. President Allison Taylor's Chief of Staff. He played Frank Sinatra in The Kennedys. Diamantopoulos played Moe Howard in the 2012 film The Three Stooges.

In 2013, Diamantopoulos voiced Mickey Mouse in the television series with the same name, and its follow-up series The Wonderful World of Mickey Mouse. Although Bret Iwan has voiced Mickey in most media following Wayne Allwine's death from diabetes in May 2009, Diamantopoulos voiced the character in retro-styled productions, giving Mickey Mouse a voice similar to that of Walt Disney. Most recently, he reprised the character in the 2023 short film Once Upon a Studio, made to celebrate the centennial of The Walt Disney Company and Walt Disney Animation Studios.

He had recurring roles on the NBC sitcoms Up All Night, as Maya Rudolph's on and off lover, Julian; The Office, as Brian, a former member of the show's documentary film crew (alongside Zach Woods, who he would later work again with on Silicon Valley); and on Arrested Development, as Marky, Lindsay's face-blind environmentalist boyfriend.

He appeared in the television sitcom Episodes playing the part of TV network boss Castor Sotto, and Mr. Chris in the television adaptation of About a Boy.

In 2017, Diamantopoulos starred in the musical Waitress on Broadway.

On October 11, 2018, it was revealed by TVLine that he would have a role in the spin-off pilot for the situation comedy The Middle playing Sue Heck's mercurial, charming and rich boss Nick.

He has an upcoming starring role alongside Tom Blyth in the comedy Discussion Materials adapted from Bill Keenan's memoir of the same name.

As of August 28, 2026, he has a role as an agent in season 2 of the Apple TV series Dark Matter.

== Personal life ==
He met Becki Newton at a subway station in New York City. They married in 2005. The couple have four children: a boy born in November 2010, a girl born in 2014, a girl born in 2020, and a girl born in 2022.

== Filmography ==
=== Film ===
Year	Title	Role	Notes	Refs.
2000	The Adulterer	Dave		
2001	Drop Dead Roses	Trevor		
2006	Wedding Daze	William		
2007	Three Days to Vegas	Laurent Perrier		
2007	Protagonist	Ancient Greek Narrator (voice)	Documentary	
2009	Under New Management	Robert Monte		
2012	The Three Stooges	Moe Howard		
2013	The Art of the Steal	Guy de Cornet		
2013	Empire State	Spiro		
2014	Dr. Cabbie	Colin Hill		
2015	Man Vs.	Doug		
2015	Batman Unlimited: Animal Instincts	Green Arrow (voice)	Direct-to-video	
2015	Batman Unlimited: Monster Mayhem	Green Arrow (voice)	Direct-to-video	
2016	Batman Unlimited: Mechs vs. Mutants	Green Arrow (voice)	Direct-to-video	
2018	The Truth About Lies	Eric Stone		
2021	Justice Society: World War II	Steve Trevor (voice)	Direct-to-video	
2021	Red Notice	Sotto Voce		
2021	Diary of a Wimpy Kid	Frank Heffley (voice)		
2022	Beavis and Butt-Head Do the Universe	Police Officer, Prisoners, Corrections Officers (voice)		
2022	Diary of a Wimpy Kid: Rodrick Rules	Frank Heffley (voice)		
2022	High Heat	Tom		
2023	Once Upon a Studio	Mickey Mouse (voice)		
2023	Diary of a Wimpy Kid Christmas: Cabin Fever	Frank Heffley (voice)		
2023	The Boys in the Boat	Royal Brougham		
2025	Diary of a Wimpy Kid: The Last Straw	Frank Heffley (voice)		
2026	Diary of a Wimpy Kid Christmas: The Getaway	Frank Heffley (voice)		

=== Television ===
Year	Title	Role	Notes	Refs.
2002	Law & Order	Chris Wilson	Episode: "Open Season"	
2004	American Dreams	Coach Tom Berg	2 episodes	
2004	Charmed	Inspector Davis	Episode: "Charmed Noir"	
2004	DeMarco Affairs	Ernesto Boticelli	Television film	
2004	Frasier	Steve	Episode: "And Frasier Makes Three"	
2004	Kevin Hill	Gil Hacker	Episode: "Love Don't Live Here Anymore"	
2004	Nip/Tuck	Chad Myers	Episode: "Erica Noughton"	
2004	Third Watch	Hansen	Episode: "Black and Blue"	
2005	Behind the Camera: The Unauthorized Story of Mork & Mindy	Robin Williams	Television film	
2005	Into the Fire	NTSB Agent #2	Television film	
2005	Jake in Progress	Cesar	Episode: "Stand by Your Man"	
2006	52 Fights	Rob	Television film	
2006	Boston Legal	Douglas Karnes	Episode: "Whose God Is It Anyway?"	
2006	The Sopranos	Jason Barone	Episode: "The Fleshy Part of the Thigh"	
2006–present	American Dad!	Various voices	38 episodes	
2007	CSI: Crime Scene Investigation	Oliver Zarco	Episode: "The Chick Chop Flick Shop"	
2007	Raines	Andrew Carver	Episode: "Closure"	
2007	The Starter Wife	Rodney	6 episodes	
2007	State of Mind	Phil Erikson	6 episodes	
2008	Eli Stone	Jake McCann	Episode: "Wake Me Up Before You Go-Go"	
2008	The Starter Wife	Rodney	10 episodes	
2010	24	Rob Weiss	12 episodes	
2011	The Kennedys	Frank Sinatra	Episode: "Bobby's War"	
2011–2012	Up All Night	Julian	4 episodes	
2012	WWE Raw	Moe Howard	Episode #20.15	
2012	Made in Hollywood	Moe	Episode #7.24; archive audio only	
2013	Arrested Development	Marky Bark, Divine Spirit	7 episodes	
2013	Community	Reinhold	Episode: "Alternative History of the German Invasion"	
2013	Doctor Lollipop	Dr. Lollipop (voice)	Pilot	
2013	The Goodwin Games	Chad	Episode: "The Birds of Granby"	
2013	The Office	Brian	5 episodes	
2013–2018	Family Guy	Parker Stanton, Frank Maxwell, Stryker Foxx, Millipede, Dean Martin, Mickey Mouse (voice)	7 episodes	
2013–2019	Mickey Mouse	Mickey Mouse, additional voices	94 episodes	
2014	Hannibal	Clark Ingram	2 episodes	
2014	High Moon	Ian	Television film	
2014–2015	About a Boy	Mr. Chris	9 episodes	
2014–2015	Episodes	Caster Sotto	8 episodes	
2015	Batman Unlimited	Green Arrow (voice)	2 episodes	
2015	BoJack Horseman	Matthew Fox (voice)	Episode: "Hank After Dark"	
2015	Club Penguin: Halloween Panic!	Redrum (voice)	Television special	
2015	Ellen More or Less	Jerry	Television film	
2015	Robot Chicken	Michael Bay, Fritz Darges (voice)	Episode: "Zero Vegetables"	
2015–2016	Good Girls Revolt	Evan Phinnaeus 'Finn' Woodhouse	10 episodes	
2015–2019	Silicon Valley	Russ Hanneman	25 episodes	
2016	Style Code Live	Himself	Episode: "Good Girls Revolt Cast Interview & One Knit Wonders"	
2016	Duck the Halls: A Mickey Mouse Christmas Special	Mickey Mouse (voice)	Television special	
2016–2018	Skylanders Academy	Master Eon, Chompy Mage (voice)	Voice, 38 episodes	
2016–2018	Justice League Action	Green Arrow, Metallo, Nyorlath, H.I.V.E. Master (voice)	10 episodes	
2017	A Christmas Story Live!	Old Man Parker	Television film	
2017	Click, Clack, Moo: Christmas at the Farm	Mouse (voice)	Television film	
2017	Entertainment Tonight	Himself	2 episodes	
2017	Law & Order: Special Victims Unit	David Willard	Episode: "Know It All"	
2017	The Scariest Story Ever: A Mickey Mouse Halloween Spooktacular	Mickey Mouse, Morty Fieldmouse, Ferdie Fieldmouse (voice)	Television special	
2017–2018	Celebrity Page	Himself	2 episodes	
2018	The Dangerous Book for Boys	Patrick, Terry McKenna	6 episodes	
2018	Harvey Girls Forever!	Boy #1, Cheesecake the Horse (voice)	Episode: "Campfire Weekend/Girls Just Wanna Save Fun"	
2018	Let's Get Physical	Barry Cross	8 episodes	
2018	Sue Sue in the City	Nick	Television film	
2018	Voltron: Legendary Defender	Macidus (voice)	2 episodes	
2018–2021	DuckTales	Storkules, Drake Mallard/Darkwing Duck, Mikey Melon, Mystical Goat, Eggheads, Hades (voice)	9 episodes	
2018–2019	Go Away, Unicorn!	Unicorn, Dad (voice)	26 episodes	
2019	FBI	Benjamin Chase	Episode: "Invisible"	
2019	The Twilight Zone	Joe Beaumont	Episode: "Nightmare at 30,000 Feet" (credited as "The 'Pilot'")	
2019	Elementary	Jason Wood	Episode: "Into the Woods"	
2019	Green Eggs and Ham	Bean Counter (voice)	Episode: "Here"	
2020	Harley Quinn	Aquaman (voice)	2 episodes	
2020	Rapunzel's Tangled Adventure	Brock Thunderstrike/Flynn Rider (voice)	Voice, episode: "Flynnposter"	
2020–2021	The Fungies!	Cmdr. Beefy	Voice, 6 episodes	
2020–2025	Blood of Zeus	Poseidon, Evios, Brontes (voice; 15 episodes)		
2020–2023	The Wonderful World of Mickey Mouse	Mickey Mouse, additional voices		
2021–present	Invincible	Donald Ferguson, Doc Seismic, Isotope (voice)		
2021	Bless the Harts	Minister Mikey (voice)	Episode: "Easters 11"	
2021	Solos	Technician	Episode: "Jenny"	
2021	Big City Greens	Ed Zecutive (voice)	Episode: "Animation Abomination"	
2021	Centaurworld	Ched (voice)	18 episodes	
2021	The Harper House	Dr. Morocco (voice)	7 episodes	
2021	Inside Job	Robotus/Alpha-Beta (voice)	6 episodes	
2021	The Ghost and Molly McGee	Ezekiel "Tug" Tugbottom (voice)	Episode: "Monumental Disaster"	
2021	True Story	Savvas		
2022	Made for Love	Agent Hank Walsh		
2022	The Boys Presents: Diabolical	Server, TV Reporter, CLF Leader (voice)	2 episodes	
2022	Super Giant Robot Brothers	Thunder (voice)	10 episodes	
2022–2023	Pantheon	Julius Pope (voice)		
2022–present	Beavis and Butt-Head	Host, Keith, John Liland, George, Angel, Steve (voice)	6 episodes	
2023	Daisy Jones & the Six	Lee Parlin	Miniseries	
2023	Mrs. Davis	JQ	TV series	
2023	The Bad Guys: A Very Bad Holiday	Mr. Snake (voice)	Television special	
2024	The Bad Guys: Haunted Heist	Mr. Snake, Reginald E. Scary (voice)	Television special	
2024	The Sticky	Mike Byrne	6 episodes	
2024	Zombies: The Re-Animated Series	Sasquatch (voice)	Episode: "Reality Check, Please!/Their Guy Sasquatch"	
2025	The Terminal List: Dark Wolf	Aaron Fuller	2 episodes	
2025–present	The Bad Guys: The Series	Mr. Snake (voice)	19 episodes	
2026	Star Wars: Maul – Shadow Lord	Looti Vario (voice)	9 episodes	
2026	Dark Matter	Agent Mitchel MacNamara	Season 2	
2026	Living the Dream			

=== Stage ===
Year	Title	Role	Venue	Notes
1995	Andrew Lloyd Webber - Music of the Night	Performer	Touring	
2000	The Full Monty	Ethan Girard	Eugene O'Neill Theatre	Replacement
2001	The Full Monty	Ethan Girard	National Tour	
2003	Les Misérables	Marius Pontmercy	Imperial Theatre	Replacement
2017	Waitress	Dr. Jim Pomatter	Brooks Atkinson Theatre	Replacement

=== Video games ===
Year	Title	Voice role	Notes	Refs.
2003	Celebrity Deathmatch	Voice-over actor	Credited as Chris Diamantopolis	
2007	300: March to Glory	Daxos, Persian Commander, Various Persians	Grouped under "Cast"	
2023	Star Wars Jedi: Survivor	MXNK-6 / Monk		

=== Theme park attractions ===
Year	Title	Role	Notes
2020	Mickey & Minnie's Runaway Railway	Mickey Mouse	Voice
