= Hunter Dillon =

American actor

- Born: February 5, 2002 (age 24); Vancouver, British Columbia, Canada
- Occupation: Actor
- Years active: 2013–present

Hunter Dillon (born February 5, 2002) is a Canadian actor. He first gained mainstream attention with a recurring role as Caleb on season 2 of the Fox horror television series The Exorcist (2017). He had his breakout with a main role as Tyler Flaherty on the Hulu series Holly Hobbie (2018–2022), for which he was nominated for a Canadian Screen Award for Best Performance in a Children's or Youth Program or Series.

Dillon had a starring voice role as Rodrick Heffley in the Diary of a Wimpy Kid animated film series (2021–present), along with a starring role in the film Riceboy Sleeps (2022) and a recurring role as Hatcher on the Roku Channel fantasy series The Spiderwick Chronicles (2024).

== Career ==
Dillon made his debut with a guest role as Young Sam Winchester in an episode of Supernatural (2013). He later portrayed Caleb on the second season of the Fox horror television series The Exorcist (2017). He guest starred as Sam on an episode of the CW anthology series Two Sentence Horror Stories (2021). In August 2021, he was cast in the independent drama film Riceboy Sleeps, which was released in September 2022. In December 2021, he had a starring voice role as Rodrick Heffley in the animated film adaptation of Diary of a Wimpy Kid. He reprised the role in two sequels: Rodrick Rules (2022) and Cabin Fever (2023). In 2023, Dillon was cast in a recurring role as Hatcher on the Disney+ series The Spiderwick Chronicles, which was later picked up by the Roku Channel and premiered on April 19, 2024.

== Filmography ==
=== Film ===
Year	Title	Role	Notes
2018	To All the Boys I've Loved Before	Young Peter	
2018	Deadpool 2	Branding Boy	
2021	Diary of a Wimpy Kid	Rodrick Heffley (voice)	
2022	Riceboy Sleeps	Harry	
2022	Golden Delicious	Sam	
2022	Diary of a Wimpy Kid: Rodrick Rules	Rodrick Heffley (voice)	
2023	Diary of a Wimpy Kid Christmas: Cabin Fever	Rodrick Heffley (voice)	
2025	Thanks to the Hard Work of the Elephants	Alex	
2025	Diary of a Wimpy Kid: The Last Straw	Rodrick Heffley (voice)	
2026	Teenage Sex and Death at Camp Miasma	Chuck	
2026	Girls Like Girls	Goose	
2026	Diary of a Wimpy Kid Christmas: The Getaway	Rodrick Heffley (voice)	

=== Television ===
Year	Title	Role	Notes
2013	Supernatural	Young Sam Winchester	Episode: "Bad Boys"
2014	Happy Face Killer	Keith's son	Television film
2014	Signed, Sealed, Delivered	Young Sam	Episode: "Soulmates"
2016	Wayward Pines	Child Abby #2	Episode: "City Upon a Hill"
2017	Dirk Gently's Holistic Detective Agency	Young Arnold	3 episodes
2017	The Exorcist	Caleb	Recurring role (season 2)
2018	Beyblade Burst	Boa Alcazaba (voice)	5 episodes; English version
2018–2022	Holly Hobbie	Tyler Flaherty	Main role
2020	Gabby Duran & the Unsittables	Joey Panther	Episode: "Who is Joey Panther?"
2021	Two Sentence Horror Stories	Sam	Episode: "Bag Man"
2021	Family Law	Justin	2 episodes
2024	Tracker	Noah Kennedy	Episode: "Mt. Shasta"
2024	The Spiderwick Chronicles	Hatcher	6 episodes
TBA	Bishop †	Ren Graves	TBD episodes

Key
†	Denotes television productions that have not yet been released

== Awards and nominations ==
Year	Award	Category	Nominated work	Result
2020	Canadian Screen Awards	Best Performance in a Children's or Youth Program or Series	Holly Hobbie	Nominated
