= Bryce Hodgson =

Canadian actor

Bryce Hodgson (born February 22, 1989) is a Canadian actor, playwright and filmmaker, best known for portraying Ben Segal in the Diary of a Wimpy Kid film series and Don E. in the television series iZombie.

== Background ==
Born and raised in Vancouver, British Columbia, he began his career as a child actor, with various supporting roles in film and television including recurring supporting parts as Ben in the Diary of a Wimpy Kid film series and Artie Maddicks in X-Men. After becoming disillusioned and burnt out, he went through a brief rebellious phase in the city's punk rock scene before getting involved in youth community theatre, studying under Kate Twa at the city's Lyric Theatre.

== Theatre career ==
In 2010, he was one of the founders of the Vancouver-based Little Bastards theatre company, where his colleagues included filmmaker Anthony Shim.

In 2014, he performed in New York City in an Off-Broadway stage adaptation of Deliverance. With Danny Blackburn, he also composed original music for the production, receiving a Drama Desk Award nomination for Outstanding Music in a Play in 2015.

He was later one of the founders of Blood Pact Theatre. The company debuted in September 2016 with Kill Your Parents in Viking, Alberta, a play co-written by Hodgson and Charlie Kerr. The company followed up in 2018 with After Wrestling, another play co-written by Hodgson and Kerr, and No Clowns Allowed, a play written by Hodgson's colleague Bri Proke.

In 2019, the company acquired its own theatre venue, Grand Canyon, in The Junction neighbourhood of Toronto, Ontario, launching the space with Hodgson's play Dock Mother God Society.

== Filmmaking ==
Blackbear, his first short film as a director, premiered at the 2022 Fantasia Film Festival, where it received an honorable mention from the international short film award jury.

In the fall of 2023, he began production on his feature directorial debut, Thanks to the Hard Work of the Elephants. The film received a private industry screening at the 78th Locarno Film Festival in August 2025, prior to its public premiere at the 2025 Vancouver International Film Festival.
