= Diary of a Wimpy Kid: The Last Straw (film) =

2025 comedy film

- Official poster
- Directed by: Matt Danner
- Screenplay by: Jeff Kinney
- Based on: Diary of a Wimpy Kid: The Last Straw by Jeff Kinney
- Produced by: Jeff Kinney
- Starring: Aaron D. Harris; Chris Diamantopoulos; William Stanford Davis; Jude Zarzaur
- Edited by: Nolan Guerriero; William Moran-MacDonald
- Music by: John Paesano; Adam Hochstatter
- Production companies: Walt Disney Pictures (Note: While the film is released under the Walt Disney Pictures banner, the film is copyrighted to 20th Century Studios.); Bardel Entertainment
- Distributed by: Disney+
- Release date: December 5, 2025
- Running time: 78 minutes
- Countries: United States; Canada
- Language: English

Diary of a Wimpy Kid: The Last Straw is a 2025 animated Christmas comedy film based on the 2009 book of the same name by Jeff Kinney. It is the eighth installment in the Diary of a Wimpy Kid film series, the fourth animated film in the series, and a direct sequel to Diary of a Wimpy Kid Christmas: Cabin Fever (2023). It is also the second adaptation of The Last Straw, after elements of the book were previously adapted into the 2012 live-action film Diary of a Wimpy Kid: Dog Days.

The film was announced in July 2025 alongside its sequel The Getaway (2026), and was released on Disney+ on December 5, 2025. It received generally mixed reviews from critics.

== Plot ==
Middle schooler Greg Heffley finds himself continually at odds with his father, Frank's, outsized expectations. Believing his son is too "wimpy," Frank threatens to send Greg to Spag Union Military Academy, forcing Greg to desperately attempt to prove he can "toughen up" and handle responsibility.

Greg repeatedly tries to prove himself through a mix of genuine efforts and deception, but each one backfires. Ultimately, Frank has had enough and signs Greg up for Spag Union via the school's website. The next day, Susan, Frank's wife and Greg's mother, signs them up for the Woodchippers Father-Son Camping Trip.

While the other Father-Son duos get along, Greg and Frank continue to struggle to cooperate. Eventually, the entire camping group gets lost in the woods, but Greg's quick thinking helps them all get out. After Frank's boss, Mr. Warren was accidentally washed away in a stream that leads to a waterfall, Greg, Frank and the other campers worked together to form a human chain to rescue Mr. Warren. The successful rescue convinces Frank to not let Greg go to Spag Union after all.

== Voice cast ==
- Aaron D. Harris as Greg Heffley. He was previously voiced by Brady Noon and Wesley Kimmel.
- Chris Diamantopoulous as Frank Heffley
- William Stanford Davis as Troopmaster Barrett
- Jude Zarzaur as Rowley Jefferson. He was previously voiced by Ethan William Childress and Spencer Howell.
- Erica Cerra as Susan Heffley
- Hunter Dillon as Rodrick Heffley
- Gracen Newton as Manny Heffley
- Ellis Myers as Fregley. He was originally voiced by Christian Convery.
- Jill Basey as Mrs. Canfield
- Bashir Salahuddin as Mr. Warren
- Jabari Banks as Lenwood Heath
- Randy Pearlstein as Robert Jefferson
- Abhiram Gulati as Chirag Gupta. He was originally voiced by Veda Maharaj in the first film.
- Sanjay Rao as Mr. Gupta
- Punam Patel as Mrs. Winsky
- Lila Bahng as Patty Farrell
- Dashiell McGaha Schlettee as Ricky Fisher
- P.L. Brown as the Priest of Plainview Church
- Grey DeLisle as the organ player of Plainview Church
- Enzo Valdez as Mikey
- Kyrie Neriah Kennedy as Weston Woods

== Reception ==
On Decider, Critic John Serba gave the movie a "Stream It" verdict. He noted that while Greg Heffley is still "kind of a jerk," he is learning to be less so. Serba pointed out that the film is an improvement over previous animated entries because it is "more structurally and thematically sound," focusing on the father-son dynamic. He praised the "reasonably strong final stretch" that offers a warm message about family and growing up without being overly sentimental.

Plugged In stated that the movie is "predictably filled with slapstick violence and grossout gags," which might cause some parents to roll their eyes. However, it praised the movie's "very sweet messages" about the importance of integrity, hard work, and family. The review highlighted the strong positive elements, such as Susan Heffley's wisdom about parenting and Frank's realization that simply showing up for his son is a valuable lesson. It ultimately gave the film "merit badges for its messages."

On Common Sense Media, the notes on what parents need to know. It mentions the cartoon violence (e.g., a dog bite, a raccoon attack) and crude language ("butt," "stupid"), but notes it sticks to its PG rating. The main positive message highlighted is that lying, keeping secrets, and taking shortcuts don't pay off, emphasizing themes of responsibility and integrity.

== Sequel ==
Along with The Last Straw's announcement in July 2025, a fifth film was also announced, adapting The Getaway book. The film is set to premiere on Disney+ on December 4, 2026.
