= Star Farm Productions =

Star Farm Productions was an independent entertainment company that designs, creates, and develops children's entertainment properties simultaneously in multiple media.

== Productions ==
Star Farm Productions is a Chicago, IL based children's entertainment company that focuses on creating intellectual properties across multiple media. Star Farm was co-founded by Trish Lindsay, Rick Carton and Sara Berliner.

Star Farm's first property, Edgar & Ellen, is a six-book series launched in September 2003. A second series, "The Nodyssey" launched in 2007. All Edgar & Ellen books were written by Charles Ogden and illustrated by Rick Carton. The books are published in the US and Canada by Simon & Schuster and are available in 12 languages and 66 countries through 14 publishers.

=== Edgar & Ellen books ===
Original Series

1. Rare Beasts September 2003
2. Tourist Trap May 2004
3. Under Town September 2004
4. Pet's Revenge released in the UK and AUS recently (appeared on American shelves in late 2006)
5. High Wire released in the UK and AUS recently (appeared on American shelves in late 2006)
6. Nod's Limbs 2007 (US) and late 2006 (UK, AUS)

The Nodyssey

1. Hot Air 2008 (US)
2. Frost Bites 2008 (US)
3. Split Ends 2009 (US)

Bridge Books: Mischief Manual 2007 Graphic Novelty 2009

== Interaction ==
With each book, Star Farm Productions seeks to engage kids online and through live workshops. The company led travel writing and animation workshops with kids across the country in 2005, and an online travel writing workshop is available. Also available is the Nod's Limbs Gazette, an online newsletter set in the world of Edgar and Ellen that includes kid-written articles. The company maintains an online privacy policy.
