= Diary of a Wimpy Kid: Rodrick Rules (2022 film) =

Disney+ original animated film

- Official release poster
- Directed by: Luke Cormican
- Screenplay by: Jeff Kinney
- Based on: Diary of a Wimpy Kid: Rodrick Rules by Jeff Kinney
- Produced by: Jeff Kinney
- Starring: Brady Noon; Hunter Dillon; Ethan William Childress; Chris Diamantopoulos; Erica Cerra; Ed Asner
- Edited by: Sylvain Blais; Rob Levesque; Matthew Sipple
- Music by: John Paesano
- Production companies: Walt Disney Pictures (Note: While the film is released under the Walt Disney Pictures banner, the film is copyrighted to 20th Century Studios.); Bardel Entertainment
- Distributed by: Disney+
- Release date: December 2, 2022
- Running time: 75 minutes
- Countries: United States; Canada
- Language: English

Diary of a Wimpy Kid: Rodrick Rules (stylized with a metal umlaut as Rodrick Rüles) is a 2022 animated comedy film directed by Luke Cormican (in his feature directorial debut) from a screenplay by Jeff Kinney, based on his 2008 book of the same name. It is the sequel to Diary of a Wimpy Kid (2021) and is the second adaptation of Rodrick Rules following the 2011 live-action film. The film also is the second fully animated film in the Diary of a Wimpy Kid film series and the sixth installment overall. Brady Noon, Ethan William Childress, Chris Diamantopoulos, Erica Cerra, Ed Asner, and Hunter Dillon reprise their roles as characters from the first film.

Diary of a Wimpy Kid: Rodrick Rules was produced by Walt Disney Pictures and Bardel Entertainment, with the latter providing animation services, and it was released on Disney+, as a Disney+ original film, on December 2, 2022. The film received mixed reviews from critics. A sequel, based on Diary of a Wimpy Kid: Cabin Fever, was released on December 8, 2023, on Disney+.

== Plot ==
Rodrick throws a party while Susan, Frank, and Manny go on a weekend vacation. Greg invites Rowley over to help set up, but Rodrick locks them in the basement before it starts. They manage to escape; Rowley runs home while Greg blackmails Rodrick with photos of the party. Susan suddenly calls, telling them that they are coming home after Manny got a stomach bug. Rodrick and Greg kick out the partygoers, clean the house, and replace the bathroom door, which has 'Rodrick Rules' written on it, with Sharpie.

In return for helping Rodrick clean, he tells Greg about his "Rodrick Rules": his rules for living a relaxed lifestyle. Rodrick offers to teach Greg how to play the drums, and Greg meets the rest of Löded Diper, which includes Bill Walter, a 35-year-old man. Löded Diper prepares for an upcoming talent show. Rowley, who will perform a magic act, offers Greg to be the assistant, but Greg refuses as he believes it will fail. Frank suspects that the boys are hiding something, but Susan is happy to see them getting along. When Frank asks about the bathroom door, Greg covers and claims that he accidentally slammed it too hard, explaining why it does not lock properly. Frank and Susan reschedule their vacation, but they instead leave the boys with their Grandpa at Leisure Towers, a retirement home, which excites Rodrick.

At Leisure Towers, Rodrick reveals that the board games contain Mom Bucks, an allowance system used by Susan where the boys trade toy money for cash. While playing a game, Greg's pants get wet, and he accidentally enters the women's restroom to change. He is accused of being a peeping tom and is chased back to the room. Grandpa tells Greg that he admires that he hangs out with Rodrick, as Frank did not with his brothers. At school, Rowley reminds Greg that their life science project is due today, and Greg asks Rodrick for help, so Rodrick gives Greg his old project in exchange for some Mom Bucks, but the next day, Greg realizes that it was a failed project about plants sneezing.

Greg demands his Mom Bucks back from Rodrick in exchange for not snitching about the party. However, Susan sees the photos, grounds them, and forces Greg to be in the talent show with Rowley. As payback, Rodrick reveals that he plans to expose him for the bathroom incident at Leisure Towers. Greg and Rowley manage to get the phone from Rodrick, but accidentally send the photos. To Greg's surprise, he learns that the school believes he won a bingo competition, making him popular. On the night of the talent show, Greg sulks, having to perform. Löded Diper approaches Greg and asks him to be their drummer, as Larry loves magic and wants to switch places with him.

After getting into an argument, Greg leaves Rowley to drum. Greg sees a sad Rodrick leaving the show, and Greg explains that he wanted Rodrick to be proud of him and is worried they'll grow apart. Rodrick assures Greg that they'll still be friends even after they grow up. Greg lets Rodrick take his place in the show, despite him being grounded, which causes Susan and Frank to extend their punishment. Grandpa commends Frank for raising two good brothers while Susan excitedly dances to the band's song. Rowley's magic show ends up winning the competition while Löded Diper gains a wider audience thanks to Susan. Despite their differences, Greg and Rodrick's brotherhood improves.

== Cast ==
- Hunter Dillon as Rodrick Heffley, Greg's older brother and the drummer of Löded Diper
- Brady Noon as Greg Heffley, the main protagonist of the film
- Ethan William Childress as Rowley Jefferson, Greg's best friend
- Chris Diamantopoulos as Frank Heffley, the father of Greg, Manny and Rodrick, and the husband of Susan Heffley
- Erica Cerra as Susan Heffley, the mother of Greg, Manny, and Rodrick and the wife of Frank Heffley
- Gracen Newton as Manny Heffley, Greg and Rodrick’s mischievous younger brother
- Veena Sood as the lady in the elevator
- Ed Asner as Grandpa Heffley, Greg and Rodrick's grandfather
- Kimberly Brooks as a news anchor
- Nathan Arenas as Mackie, a member of Löded Diper
- Jimmy Tatro as Bill Walter, the leader and the oldest member of Löded Diper who is 35 years old
- Vincent Tong as Leland, Rowley's neighbor and babysitter
- Albert Tsai as Drew, a bass guitarist in Löded Diper
- Hudson Yang as Larry, a replacement drummer for Rodrick of Löded Diper
- Lex Lang as the talent show announcer

== Production ==
=== Development ===
On October 23, 2021, Jeff Kinney revealed that sequels to Diary of a Wimpy Kid were already in development. On Disney+ Day 2021, Kinney revealed the first sequel, which is based on Rodrick Rules. By October 2022, Luke Cormican was announced as the film's director.

=== Music ===
In March 2022, composer John Paesano confirmed that he would return to score the film's music. In October 2022, Paesano was confirmed as composer. The song from the movie, “Can You Smell Us Now” is also used in the 17th book in the main series, Diary of a Wimpy Kid: Diper Överlöde.

== Release ==
A teaser poster for the film was released alongside the announcement of the release date. A trailer for the film was released on October 18, 2022. On Disney+ Day in 2021, Kinney revealed that Rodrick Rules was set to be released in 2022. On September 12, 2022, it was announced for a release date of December 2.

== Reception ==
=== Critical response ===
The review aggregator website Rotten Tomatoes reported a 56% approval rating with an average rating of 6.10/10, based on 9 critic reviews.

John Serba of Decider stated, "Diary of a Wimpy Kid: Rodrick Rules firmly meets low-ish expectations for this series/franchise (anyone out there giddy with anticipation for this? Anyone? Bueller?). So, STREAM IT I guess." Jennifer Green of Common Sense Media gave the film a grade of 3 out of 5 stars, writing, "Kids break rules, face consequences in animated adaptation."

Calum Marsh of The New York Times said, "It's the sort of bland, innocuous trifle that will swiftly recede into the oblivion of a streaming service menu — a comedy without laughs and a family movie without heart, lacking any of the wit or charm of Kinney's original stories."

=== Accolades ===
The film won Best Animation / Family Movie Poster at the 2023 Golden Trailer Awards.

== Sequels ==
On December 3, 2021, Kinney stated that he intends to adapt all his books into animated features for Disney+.

On January 16, 2023, Kinney confirmed a sequel was in the works and that it would be based on the sixth book, Diary of a Wimpy Kid: Cabin Fever, which was released on Disney+ on December 8, 2023.
