= Taichung Football Association =

Taichung Football Association logo

The Taichung Football Association (TCFA; Chinese: 台中市足球協會; pinyin: Táizhōng Shì Zúqiú Xiéhuì) is the governing body of football in Taichung City, Republic of China (Taiwan).

== History ==
- 1 October 2006: Established.

== Competitions ==
- Taichung World Youth Football Festival
- Central Taiwan Futsal Championship

== See also ==
- Chinese Taipei Football Association
