= Ethan William Childress =

American actor

- Born: Las Vegas, Nevada
- Occupation: Actor
- Years active: 2019–present

Ethan William Childress is an American actor. He is best known for playing Johan Johnson in Mixed-ish and voicing Rowley Jefferson in Diary of a Wimpy Kid.

== Early life ==
Childress was born in Las Vegas, Nevada. He got interested in acting after his parents enrolled him in a charter school for the arts. While he enjoys acting, he is hoping to get a business degree from college.

== Career ==
Childress' first big role of his acting career came voicing Rowley Jefferson in the animated reboot film Diary of a Wimpy Kid. He rose to fame starring as Johan Johnson in the sitcom Mixed-ish. He reprised his role voicing Rowley in Diary of a Wimpy Kid: Rodrick Rules (2022 film). In the future, Childress hopes to work with Will Smith and Daveed Diggs.

== Personal life ==
Outside of acting, Childress likes to play sports, play video games, do jiu-jitsu, go swimming, hang out with his friends and go to the movies.

== Filmography ==
=== Film ===
Year	Title	Role	Notes
2021	Happy Place	Kid	Short
2021	Diary of a Wimpy Kid	Rowley Jefferson	Voice
2022	Breathing Happy	Hockey Trophy Ethan	
2022	Diary of a Wimpy Kid: Rodrick Rules	Rowley Jefferson	Voice

=== Television ===
Year	Title	Role	Notes
2019	Mixed-ish	Johan Johnson	36 episodes
2021	Make My Day	Pete	3 episodes
