= Diary of a Wimpy Kid (2021 film) =

2021 film by Swinton Scott

- Official poster
- Directed by: Swinton Scott
- Screenplay by: Jeff Kinney
- Based on: Diary of a Wimpy Kid by Jeff Kinney
- Produced by: Jeff Kinney
- Starring: Brady Noon; Ethan William Childress; Erica Cerra; Chris Diamantopoulos; Hunter Dillon
- Edited by: Sylvain Blais
- Music by: John Paesano
- Production companies: Walt Disney Pictures; Bardel Entertainment
- Distributed by: Disney+
- Release date: December 3, 2021
- Running time: 58 minutes
- Countries: United States; Canada
- Language: English

Diary of a Wimpy Kid is a 2021 animated comedy film directed by Swinton Scott (in his feature directorial debut) from a screenplay by Jeff Kinney, based on his 2007 book of the same name. It is the second film adaptation of the book, following the 2010 live-action film. It also serves as the first fully animated reboot in the Diary of a Wimpy Kid film series, and the fifth installment overall. The film stars the voices of Brady Noon, Ethan William Childress, Erica Cerra, Chris Diamantopoulos, and Hunter Dillon.

Diary of a Wimpy Kid was produced by Walt Disney Studios and Bardel Entertainment, with the latter providing animation services, and was released as a Disney+ original film on December 3, 2021. It received generally positive reviews from critics.

A sequel, Diary of a Wimpy Kid: Rodrick Rules, was released on December 2, 2022.

== Plot ==
Best friends Greg Heffley and Rowley Jefferson are about to enter middle school. Greg gets advice from his older brother Rodrick on how to "survive", putting emphasis on avoiding the Cheese Touch, which supposedly makes one incredibly unpopular. Figuring that Rowley's childish tendencies will cause them to be bullied, Greg tries to urge Rowley to start acting their age, almost telling him about the cheese, but deciding against it, not wanting to scare him too much. Before long, the first day of school arrives, and Greg tries to help Rowley adjust, though both end up shunned by the majority of the students, mostly due to Rowley's somewhat childish antics, which include using the word "play" over "hang out". Nevertheless, they manage to avoid scraping the bottom of the school hierarchy.

On Halloween night, Greg and Rowley have to take the former's younger brother Manny with them. While at first annoyed, Greg realizes that Manny's adorable pirate costume allows them to acquire a large amount of candy. Eventually, Manny and Rowley become tired, but Greg insists that they continue on and take a shortcut through Snake Road, despite his mother Susan forbidding it. They encounter a trio of teenage boys who begin to mock and chase them with water balloons down the road. The younger boys manage to evade them by tricking them into driving their truck into a ditch and making it home right on time, only to be soaked by Greg's father Frank, who mistook them for teenagers. Manny then outs "Snake Road" to Susan, who grounds Greg from playing video games for a week.

Later on, while playing the "Rumble Trike", Greg accidentally breaks Rowley's arm, which Susan discovers. She does not punish Greg any further, but she encourages him do the right thing and be a good friend to Rowley. Greg instead tries to take advantage of Rowley's broken arm, only to get shunned further by the other students, who dote on Rowley and demonize Greg for breaking it in the first place. Greg attempts to take a different approach and become a cartoonist for the school paper; Rowley takes an interest in a scrapped idea of his, in which the punchline of every line is "Zoo-Wee Mama!", but Greg insists on a new one he drew, urging Rowley to make his original comic instead of working together. Greg's entry gets him accepted as the new cartoonist, but the librarian butchers his comic, making his classmates mock him. After Greg resigns from his position, Rowley's comic, which features the stolen phrase, gets accepted, causing the boys to argue and break their friendship.

Rowley befriends another boy named Chirag Gupta and starts seeing him more often. In an attempt to get back at Rowley, Greg decides to hang out with Fregley, an incredibly strange and unpopular boy. Greg has a sleepover at his house but is immediately put off by his odd eccentricities. The next day, Greg and Rowley confront each other and are urged to fight by the other kids, only for the trio of teenagers to return to get revenge on the boys. The teenagers force Rowley to eat a piece of the cheese and are about to force Greg to do the same, but are stopped by Mr. Underwood, the school's gym coach.

The other students return to see what has transpired. To protect Rowley, Greg claims that he was the one who ate the cheese, causing everyone else to run from him in terror. Greg and Rowley resume their friendship as the former quickly realizes that having the Cheese Touch is a blessing as it forces everyone to give him and Rowley space, as well as a personal lunch table to themselves.

== Voice cast ==
- Brady Noon as Greg Heffley, a sixth grader and the middle brother
- Ethan William Childress as Rowley Jefferson, Greg's best friend
- Erica Cerra as Susan Heffley, Greg's mother
- Christian Convery as Fregley, a classmate of Greg's
- Chris Diamantopoulos as Frank Heffley, Greg's father
- Hunter Dillon as Rodrick Heffley, Greg's older brother
- Veda Maharaj as Chirag Gupta, a kid who becomes Rowley's new best friend after Rowley and Greg break up
- Gracen Newton as Manny Heffley, Greg's younger brother
- Billy Lopez as Mr. Underwood, the school gym coach
- Brenda Crichlow as Fregley's mother
- Yuvraj Singh Kalsi as Charlie Davies, a classmate of Greg's
- Robert Moloney as Joshie, a European pop star
- Lossen Chambers as Homeroom Teacher, a teacher who dislikes Greg
- Donny Lucas as Mr. Humphreys, the school principal
- Cyrus Arnold as Carter, the leader of the teenagers who antagonizes Greg and Rowley
- Zeno Robinson as Pete Hosey, another one of the teenagers
- Braxton Baker as Wade, another of the teenagers
- John Omohundro as a hulking teenager, a bully of Greg

== Production ==
=== Development ===
Following the release of Diary of a Wimpy Kid: Dog Days, the likelihood of a fourth live-action film was slim. In 2012, Jeff Kinney, the author of the Diary of a Wimpy Kid books, had announced the possibility for an animated film to be based on Diary of a Wimpy Kid: Cabin Fever as the next installment. In an interview for Diary of a Wimpy Kid: Hard Luck, Kinney stated he was working with Fox on a half-hour special based on Cabin Fever, which was scheduled to air in late-2014. The special was meant to be an animated production developed at 20th Century Fox Animation, and had begun development while Kinney worked on the live-action films. However, the project never came to fruition.

In August 2018, CEO of 20th Century Fox Stacey Snider stated that an animated television series based on Diary of a Wimpy Kid was in development, after Kinney decided not to allow any more live action adaptations of the series following the film adaptation of The Long Haul. In August 2019, after the acquisition of 21st Century Fox by Disney, the project was confirmed to be still in development exclusively for streaming on Disney+.

In December 2020, the project was confirmed to have been redeveloped as an animated reboot feature film simply titled, Diary of a Wimpy Kid at the Disney Investor Day event. Alongside this announcement, it was revealed that production was underway with a tentative release date slated for mid-2021. By September 2021, it was announced that the film would be an adaptation of the first book in the series; while the film was scheduled for a release date of December 3, 2021. Swinton Scott was announced as director, with Kinney serving as the writer and producer. Brady Noon, Ethan William Childress, and Chris Diamantopoulos were revealed as the voice cast.

=== Animation ===
The animation was provided by Bardel Entertainment, with offices in Vancouver and Kelowna composed by a team of 82 people all using the animation rendering software Arnold. Kinney chose to use CGI in spite of the book's hand-drawn-style drawing because he wanted the animation to "feel like the books had come to life". Pixar RenderMan was also used for the film.

=== Music ===
Diary of a Wimpy Kid: Original Soundtrack

Film score by John Paesano
- Released: December 17, 2021
- Length: 37:12
- Labels: Hollywood; Walt Disney

John Paesano chronology
The Secrets We Keep (2020)	Diary of a Wimpy Kid: Original Soundtrack (2021)	Cheaper by the Dozen (2022)

On September 23, 2021, it was revealed that John Paesano would be serving as composer. The soundtrack was released on December 17, 2021.

All music composed by Paesano:

No.	Title	Length
1.	"Diary of a Wimpy Kid"	4:23
2.	"Pep Talk"	0:47
3.	"The Cheese Touch"	0:52
4.	"Cut Him Loose"	2:12
5.	"First Day of School"	1:58
6.	"What Do We Do"	1:20
7.	"What's Cool Now"	1:19
8.	"Come Over and Play"	0:51
9.	"Trick or Treat"	2:00
10.	"Snake Road"	1:49
11.	"Bully Chase"	1:28
12.	"Do the Right Thing"	1:46
13.	"New Cast at School"	1:51
14.	"Cartooning"	2:01
15.	"Zoo-Wee-Mama"	2:14
16.	"If It Wasn't for Me"	1:31
17.	"Fregley"	3:23
18.	"Down and Out"	0:51
19.	"Cheesy Revenge"	1:54
20.	"Better Than Good"	2:42
Total length:		37:12

== Release ==
=== Marketing ===
The first look of the film was shown on December 10, 2020, at Disney's Investor Day, depicting Greg trying to roll a large snowball up a hill, only to roll down the hill with it. This would not be used in the film itself. The teaser poster was revealed on September 2, 2021 (the same day the release date was announced). The film was marketed under the Disney brand, leading to speculation that Walt Disney Pictures was involved in the film, which turned out to be true when the film was released. The trailer was released on October 19, 2021, by Walt Disney Studios' YouTube channel (the YouTube channel for Walt Disney Pictures), further increasing speculation. Additionally, the song "Bring Your Friends" by Sam Shrieve was heavily used in the film's marketing campaign but was not featured in the film itself.

A reprint of the original book featured a new Disney+ cover variant to serve as a tie-in release to the movie (this book featured a first look at Rowley Jefferson in his CG-animated form). Like the original book, Amulet Books released the book, but this time, in association with Disney Enterprises, Inc. and 20th Century Studios. It was released on November 23, 2021.

=== Streaming ===
The film was released by Disney Platform Distribution, as a Disney+ original film, on Disney+, on December 3, 2021. However, the film was released on the service under Walt Disney Pictures instead of 20th Century Studios. It was moved from 20th Century Studios and 20th Century Animation to Walt Disney Pictures sometime during production for unknown reasons.

== Reception ==
=== Critical reception ===
On the review aggregator website Rotten Tomatoes, 75% of 16 critics' reviews are positive, with an average rating of 5.50/10. Metacritic, which uses a weighted average, assigned the film a score of 50 out of 100, based on 4 critics, indicating "mixed or average" reviews.

Courtney Howard of Variety gave the film a positive review, saying, "Similar to its 2010 counterpart, this animated reboot amusingly tackles universal aspects of adolescence like first-day jitters, the fleeting nature of popularity, navigating cafeteria social hierarchies and the frustrations of not fitting in. [...] With this notable sense of visual dexterity and stirring sentiments surrounding friendship and individuality that don't come across as hollow platitudes, the brisk 56-minute feature is yet another noteworthy start to a burgeoning franchise reboot." Nicolas Rapold of The New York Times complimented the animation, found the misadventures experienced by the characters to be good-humored and believed that the film manages to explore how friendship can evolve. John Serba of Decider found the movie entertaining and lively, complimented the depiction of teachable moments, and compared Greg to Homer Simpson, describing him as a reliable anti-role model. Jennifer Green of Common Sense Media rated the movie 3 out of 5 stars, complimented the depiction of positive messages, citing self-authenticity and true friendship, and found agreeable the presence of role models, stating both Greg and Rowley demonstrate loyalty.

Jesse Hassenger of The A.V. Club gave the movie a mixed review, writing, "On that level, the new version of Wimpy Kid has its moments. It bounces between vignettes, some amusing and some choppily edited, testing the mettle of Heffley and his optimistic best pal Rowley (Ethan William Childress), perhaps Kinney's most durable creation. [...] Even if their minds wander, most grown-ups probably won't be as bored as the actors playing Heffley's parents' sound; they both give oddly flat and colorless vocal performances. It's these hints of indifference that make Diary Of A Wimpy Kid feels like a contractual obligation, or a cobbling together of streaming content, rather than the start of a new series." Sarah Bea Milner of Screen Rant rated the movie 1.5 out of 5, stating, "Existing fans of the Diary of a Wimpy Kid franchise will at least get some enjoyment from watching such a faithful adaptation. [...] Perhaps 2021's animated reboot can serve as a cautionary tale for the industry: being a good writer does not make one a good screenwriter and sometimes the best way to stay faithful to the spirit of a book is to have a competent and experienced professional write the adaptation."

=== Accolades ===
Jessica Mikayla received a nomination for Best Performance in a Voice Acting Role: Youth Actress at the 2022 Young Artist Awards. Diary of a Wimpy Kid was a nominated for Best Animation TrailerByte for a Feature Film at the 2022 Golden Trailer Awards.

== Sequels ==
On October 23, 2021, ahead of the first film's release, Jeff Kinney revealed that sequels are already in development. On Disney+ Day, Kinney revealed that the sequel, based on Rodrick Rules, would be released in 2022. In March 2022, composer John Paesano confirmed that he would return to score the film's music. A poster for the film was released on September 12, 2022, announcing the film's release date of December 2, 2022.

Kinney stated that he intends to adapt all his books into animated features for Disney+.
