= List of Disney+ original films =

This article is a list of streaming television films from Disney Branded Television, National Geographic and divisions of Walt Disney Studios including Pixar, Marvel Studios, Lucasfilm and 20th Century Studios which premiered on Disney+, an over-the-top subscription video on-demand service owned by the Disney Entertainment division of The Walt Disney Company since its launch in the United States on November 12, 2019.

== Original films ==
=== Feature films ===
Title	Release date	Genre	Runtime
Lady and the Tramp	November 12, 2019	Romance musical	1 h 52 min
Noelle	November 12, 2019	Fantasy comedy	1 h 46 min
Togo	December 20, 2019	Adventure drama	1 h 57 min
Timmy Failure: Mistakes Were Made	February 7, 2020	Comedy	1 h 44 min
Stargirl	March 13, 2020	Jukebox musical/Romantic drama	1 h 48 min
Magic Camp	August 14, 2020	Fantasy comedy	1 h 43 min
Phineas and Ferb the Movie: Candace Against the Universe	August 28, 2020	Animated musical adventure comedy	1 h 30 min
Secret Society of Second-Born Royals	September 25, 2020	Superhero	1 h 40 min
Clouds	October 16, 2020	Musical drama	2 h 3 min
Black Beauty	November 27, 2020	Drama	1 h 52 min
Godmothered	December 4, 2020	Fantasy comedy	1 h 55 min
Safety	December 11, 2020	Sports drama	2 h 3 min
Soul	December 25, 2020	Animated comedy drama	1 h 50 min
Flora & Ulysses	February 19, 2021	Family comedy	1 h 36 min
Luca	June 18, 2021	Animated coming-of-age fantasy comedy	1 h 41 min
Home Sweet Home Alone	November 12, 2021	Family comedy	1 h 35 min
Diary of a Wimpy Kid	December 3, 2021	Animated comedy	58 min
The Ice Age Adventures of Buck Wild	January 28, 2022	Animated adventure comedy	1 h 23 min
Turning Red	March 11, 2022	Animated coming-of-age fantasy comedy	1 h 47 min
Cheaper by the Dozen	March 18, 2022	Comedy	1 h 49 min
Better Nate Than Ever	April 1, 2022	Musical adventure comedy drama	1 h 34 min
Sneakerella	May 13, 2022	Musical comedy	1 h 52 min
Chip 'n Dale: Rescue Rangers	May 20, 2022	Live-action animated adventure comedy	1 h 38 min
Hollywood Stargirl	June 3, 2022	Coming-of-age romantic drama	1 h 45 min
Rise	June 24, 2022	Sports biopic	1 h 53 min
Zombies 3	July 15, 2022	Musical fantasy	1 h 30 min
Pinocchio	September 8, 2022	Musical fantasy	1 h 51 min
Hocus Pocus 2	September 30, 2022	Horror comedy	1 h 47 min
Disenchanted	November 18, 2022	Musical fantasy	2 h 1 m
Diary of a Wimpy Kid: Rodrick Rules	December 2, 2022	Animated comedy	1 h 16 m
Night at the Museum: Kahmunrah Rises Again	December 9, 2022	Animated adventure comedy	1 h 20 m
Chang Can Dunk	March 10, 2023	Sports drama	1 h 49 min
Peter Pan & Wendy	April 28, 2023	Fantasy adventure	1 h 46 min
Crater	May 12, 2023	Science fiction adventure	1 h 45 min
World's Best	June 23, 2023	Musical comedy	1 h 41 min
Dashing Through the Snow	November 17, 2023	Fantasy comedy	1 h 30 min
Diary of a Wimpy Kid Christmas: Cabin Fever	December 8, 2023	Animated Christmas comedy	1 h 4 min
Descendants: The Rise of Red	July 12, 2024	Musical fantasy	1 h 34 min
Young Woman and the Sea	July 19, 2024	Sports drama	2 h 11 min
Out of My Mind	November 22, 2024	Coming-of-age drama	1 h 50 min
Alexander and the Terrible, Horrible, No Good, Very Bad Road Trip	March 28, 2025	Family comedy	1 h 35 min
A Very Jonas Christmas Movie	November 14, 2025	Christmas comedy	1 h 20 min
Diary of a Wimpy Kid: The Last Straw	December 5, 2025	Animated comedy	1 h 18 min
Awaiting release
Diary of a Wimpy Kid Christmas: The Getaway	December 4, 2026	Animated comedy	TBA

=== Documentaries ===
Title	Release date	Subject	Runtime
Dolphin Reef	April 3, 2020	Nature	1 h 18 min
Elephant	April 3, 2020	Nature	1 h 29 min
Howard	August 7, 2020	Biography/Music	1 h 35 min
Folklore: The Long Pond Studio Sessions	November 25, 2020	Music	1 h 46 min
Own the Room	March 12, 2021	Entrepreneurship	1 h 31 min
Wolfgang	June 25, 2021	Biography	1 h 20 min
Stuntman	July 23, 2021	Stunt performance	1 h 27 min
Playing with Sharks	July 23, 2021	Nature	1 h 31 min
More Than Robots	March 18, 2022	Robot competition	1 h 31 min
Olivia Rodrigo: Driving Home 2 U	March 25, 2022	Music	1 h 16 min
Explorer: The Last Tepui	April 22, 2022	Travel	55 min
Polar Bear	April 22, 2022	Nature	1 h 24 min
The Biggest Little Farm: The Return	April 22, 2022	Farming	29 min
Mickey: The Story of a Mouse	November 18, 2022	Animation	1 h 30 min
Idina Menzel: Which Way to the Stage?	December 9, 2022	Music	1 h 34 min
If These Walls Could Sing	December 16, 2022	Music	1 h 29 min
The Flagmakers	December 21, 2022	Supplier diversity	35 min
Bono & The Edge: A Sort of Homecoming, with Dave Letterman	March 17, 2023	Music	1 h 24 min
Stan Lee	June 16, 2023	Biography/Comic books	1 h 26 min
Madu	March 29, 2024	Ballet	1 h 41 min
Tiger	April 22, 2024	Nature	1 h 29 min
The Beach Boys	May 24, 2024	Music	1 h 53 min
Jim Henson Idea Man	May 31, 2024	Biography	1 h 48 min
Music by John Williams	November 1, 2024	Music	1 h 46 min
Pets	April 11, 2025	Nature	1 h 19 min
Sea Lions of the Galapagos	April 22, 2025	Nature	1 h 23 min
Orangutan	April 22, 2026	Nature	1 h 22 min
HUZ: Drawn to Life	August 14, 2026	Biography	57 min
Disney Worldbuilders	August 20, 2026	Theme parks	59 min
Awaiting release
Wolf	April 22, 2027	Nature	TBA

=== Specials ===
These films are one-time events or supplementary content related to original or Walt Disney Pictures films.

Title	Release date	Genre	Runtime
Diving with Dolphins	April 3, 2020	Making-of documentary	1 h 19 min
In the Footsteps of Elephant	April 3, 2020	Making-of documentary	1 h 29 min
Penguins: Life on the Edge	April 3, 2020	Making-of documentary	1 h 18 min
A Celebration of the Music from Coco	April 10, 2020	Concert	47 min
Black Is King	July 31, 2020	Visual album	1 h 25 min
Arendelle Castle Yule Log	December 18, 2020	Fantasy animation	3 h
Dory's Reef Cam	December 18, 2020	Animation	3 h 1 min
Happier Than Ever: A Love Letter to Los Angeles	September 3, 2021	Concert	1 h 5 min
Muppets Haunted Mansion	October 8, 2021	Puppetry	53 min
The Making of Happier Than Ever: A Love Letter to Los Angeles	November 12, 2021	Making-of documentary	30 min
Arendelle Castle Yule Log: Cut Paper Edition	December 17, 2021	Fantasy animation	3 h
Embrace the Panda: Making Turning Red	March 11, 2022	Making-of documentary	48 min
Bear Witness	April 22, 2022	Making-of documentary	1 h 23 min
Beyond Infinity: Buzz and the Journey to Lightyear	June 10, 2022	Making-of documentary	35 min
Werewolf by Night	October 7, 2022	Superhero horror	54 min
Director by Night	November 4, 2022	Making-of documentary	54 min
Best in Snow	November 18, 2022	Reality competition	1 h 37 min
Elton John Live: Farewell From Dodger Stadium	November 20, 2022	Concert	2 h 54 min
The Guardians of the Galaxy Holiday Special	November 25, 2022	Superhero comedy	44 min
The Hip Hop Nutcracker	November 25, 2022	Musical	44 min
Pentatonix: Around the World for the Holidays	December 2, 2022	Docu-reality	49 min
Encanto at the Hollywood Bowl	December 28, 2022	Concert	45 min
Miley Cyrus – Endless Summer Vacation (Backyard Sessions)	March 10, 2023	Concert	42 min
Lego Disney Princess: The Castle Quest	August 18, 2023	Fantasy animation	49 min
Good Chemistry: The Story of Elemental	September 13, 2023	Making-of documentary	41 min
Lang Lang Plays Disney	September 15, 2023	Concert	1 h
Werewolf by Night in Color	October 20, 2023	Superhero horror	54 min
The Shepherd	December 1, 2023	Drama	39 min
Timeless Heroes: Indiana Jones & Harrison Ford	December 1, 2023	Making-of documentary	1 h 30 min
Tigers on the Rise	April 22, 2024	Making-of documentary	1 h 17 min
An Almost Christmas Story	November 15, 2024	Animation	25 min
Descendants: The Rise of Red Sing-Along	November 29, 2024	Musical fantasy	1 h 34 min
The Lion King at the Hollywood Bowl	February 7, 2025	Concert	1 h 8 min
Guardians of the Galapagos	April 22, 2025	Making-of documentary	1 h 13 min
Lego Disney Princess: Villains Unite	August 25, 2025	Fantasy animation	26 min
The Muppet Show	February 4, 2026	Sketch variety/puppetry	33 min
Hannah Montana 20th Anniversary Special	March 24, 2026	Music	59 min
The Punisher: One Last Kill	May 12, 2026	Superhero action drama	51 min
Lego Disney Princess: Magical Mayhem	August 21, 2026	Fantasy animation	25 min
Lego Star Wars: The Mandalorian	September 2, 2026	Space opera animation	49 min
A Proud Family Wizmas	November 14, 2026	Animated holiday special	51 min

=== Shorts ===
These are programs that have a runtime of less than 20 minutes.

Title	Release date	Genre	Runtime
Lamp Life	January 31, 2020	Animated short	12 min
Once Upon a Snowman	October 23, 2020	Animated short	13 min
Myth: A Frozen Tale	February 26, 2021	Animated short	12 min
22 vs. Earth	April 30, 2021	Animated short	9 min
Star Wars Biomes	May 4, 2021	ASMR	18 min
Ciao Alberto	November 12, 2021	Animated short	9 min
Marvel Studios' 2021 Disney+ Day Special	November 12, 2021	Sneak peek	14 min
Pixar 2021 Disney+ Day Special	November 12, 2021	Sneak peek	4 min
Zen – Grogu and Dust Bunnies	November 12, 2022	Space opera animated short	3 min
Indiana Jones and the Dial of Destiny: A Special Look	May 31, 2023	Making-of documentary	3 min
Red Christmas	November 29, 2024	Music video	3 min
Lego Frozen: Operation Puffins	October 24, 2025	Fantasy animated short	18 min
Versa	March 27, 2026	Animated short	13 min

=== Non-English language ===
==== Feature films ====
Title	Release date	Genre	Runtime	Language
King Shakir Recycle	January 18, 2023	Animation	1 h 31 min	Turkish

==== Documentaries ====
Title	Release date	Genre	Runtime	Language
Tomorrow X Together: Our Lost Summer	July 28, 2023	Music documentary	1 h 22 min	Korean

==== Specials and shorts ====
Title	Release date	Genre	Runtime	Language
BTS: Permission to Dance on Stage – LA	September 8, 2022	Concert film	2 h 10 min	Korean
Just Love and a Thousand Songs	December 8, 2022	Music	29 min	Spanish
Le Pupille	December 16, 2022	Comedy drama	38 min	Italian

== Regional original films ==
These films are originals because Disney+ commissioned or acquired them and had their premiere on the service, but they are only available in specific Disney+ territories.

Title	Release date	Genre	Runtime	Exclusive region(s)	Language
Sea of Plastic	September 25, 2020	Documentary	48 min	France	French
When Frank Met Carlitos	August 18, 2023	Biographical comedy drama	1 h 12 min	North and South America	Spanish
King & Prince: What We Got - A Miracle With You	August 1, 2025	Making-of documentary	28 min	Select territories	Japanese

== Exclusive films ==
These films premiered on the service without the Disney+ Original label. Availability may vary across regions.

=== Feature films ===
Title	Release date	Genre	Runtime
Artemis Fowl	June 12, 2020	Fantasy adventure	1 h 40 min
Hamilton	July 3, 2020	Musical	2 h 40 min
The One and Only Ivan	August 21, 2020	Fantasy drama	1 h 38 min
Trevor: The Musical	June 24, 2022	Musical	1 h 53 min
Frozen: The Hit Broadway Musical	June 20, 2025	Musical fantasy	1 h 52 min

=== Documentaries ===
Title	Release date	Subject	Runtime	Language
Marvel's Behind the Mask	February 12, 2021	Superheroes	1 h 5 min	English
J-Hope in the Box	February 17, 2023	Music	1 h 25 min	Korean
SUGA: Road to D-Day	April 21, 2023	Music	1 h 20 min	Korean
DANNA: We Have to Talk ― A Childstar Film	November 27, 2024	Music	1 h 24 min	Spanish
Beatles '64	November 29, 2024	Music	1 h 47 min	English
Not Just a Goof	April 7, 2025	Animation	1 h 27 min	English
Disneyland Handcrafted	January 22, 2026	Biography/History	1 h 19 min	English

=== Specials ===
Title	Release date	Genre	Runtime	Exclusive region(s)
Soy Luna: The Last Concert	February 26, 2021	Concert film	1 h 31 min	Latin America
Harmonious Live!	June 21, 2022	Fireworks show	33 min	Select territories
Taylor Swift: The Eras Tour (Taylor's Version)	March 15, 2024	Concert film	3 h 31 min	All markets
2024 Disney Legends Award Ceremony	August 12, 2024	Awards ceremony	2 h 33 min	United States and Canada
Miley Cyrus: Something Beautiful	July 16, 2025	Music visual album	45 min	Select territories
Taylor Swift: The Eras Tour: The Final Show	December 12, 2025	Concert	3 h 28 min	All markets
Generations: The Evolution of Spider-Man	July 17, 2026	Documentary	27 min	Select territories
D23 Horizons: Disney Experiences Showcase	August 15, 2026	Variety show	2 h 19 min	United States and Canada
2026 Disney Legends Award Ceremony	August 16, 2026	Awards ceremony	2 h 17 min	United States and Canada

=== Shorts ===
Title	Release date	Genre	Runtime
Remembering	September 8, 2022	Fantasy	9 min

=== Premier Access ===

Disney+ Premier Access was a premium release strategy for the global on-demand Internet streaming media provider, owned and operated by Disney. The Premier Access option was created to ensure people could still access major new releases in areas with closed movie theaters, due to the COVID-19 pandemic.

The first film released with Premier Access was the 2020 live-action release Mulan. The films are released to Disney+ in most markets on the same day as their theatrical release (with the exception of Mulan, which was only initially released through Premier Access), and can be accessed for a one-time payment of US$29.99 (or an approximately equivalent payment in local currency). Unlike other premium video-on-demand releases, which typically expire within 48 hours of first viewing, Premier Access films can be rewatched as many times as desired, provided the customer remains subscribed to Disney+. However, these films are eventually made available on Disney+ without the need for an additional payment, typically 60–90 days after release.

Jungle Cruise was the final film released as part of the strategy, as Disney committed to giving the rest of their 2021 (and later, 2022) theatrical releases a minimum 45 day exclusivity window in theaters before becoming available through other outlets (like Disney+, Hulu, HBO Max, and/or transactional VOD, depending on the label the film was released under), with the exception of Encanto and Strange World, which were given a 30 day exclusivity window in theaters so Disney could make the films available on Disney+ in time for the holiday season.

Premier Access was not available in France. Mulan was instead made exclusively available in France via Disney+, at no additional charge, on December 4, 2020, the same date as it became available to the remaining Disney+ subscribers globally. The other Premier Access films received regular theatrical releases in France, but will not be available to stream on Disney+ in that country until at least 36 months after release, due to local regulations. Despite these regulations being revised to shorten the window in January 2022, Disney opposed them, stating that they were "not consumer friendly", and subsequently announced in June 2022 that Strange World would not receive a theatrical release in France and go straight to Disney+ in the region (following a theatrical release in other regions), with Disney also announcing that the status of their future theatrical releases in France would be determined on a case-by-case basis.

Title	Genre	Premier Access release date	Standard Disney+ release date	Runtime
Mulan	Fantasy action-drama	September 4, 2020	December 4, 2020	1 h 58 min
Raya and the Last Dragon	Animated fantasy action-adventure	March 5, 2021	June 4, 2021	1 h 55 min
Cruella	Crime comedy drama	May 28, 2021	August 27, 2021	2 h 17 min
Black Widow	Superhero action-drama	July 9, 2021	October 6, 2021	2 h 15 min
Jungle Cruise	Fantasy adventure	July 30, 2021	November 12, 2021	2 h 9 min

== Upcoming films ==
=== Feature films ===
Title	Release date	Genre	Runtime	Status	Notes
The Cheetah Girls: Next Gen	2027	Coming-of-age musical	TBA	Post-production	
Hidden Heroes: A Descendants Story	2027	Fantasy musical	TBA	Post-production	
Zombies 5: Secrets of the Sea	2027	Fantasy Musical	TBA	Post-production	
Untitled sixth Diary of a Wimpy Kid film	TBA	Animated comedy	TBA	In production	
Untitled third Phineas and Ferb film	TBA	Animated musical comedy	TBA	In production	
Halloweentown 5	TBA	Supernatural coming-of-age comedy	TBA	In development	
Sister Act 3	TBA	Comedy	TBA	In development	
Phantom	TBA	Musical	TBA	In development	
Untitled third Rio film	TBA	Animated musical comedy	TBA	In development	

=== Documentaries ===
Title	Release date	Subject	Runtime	Notes
Untitled Julie Andrews Documentary	2027	Biography	TBA	

== See also ==
- List of Star (Disney+) original programming#Original films
- List of Disney+ Hotstar original films#Disney+ Originals
- List of Disney Channel original films
