= Aruba Red =

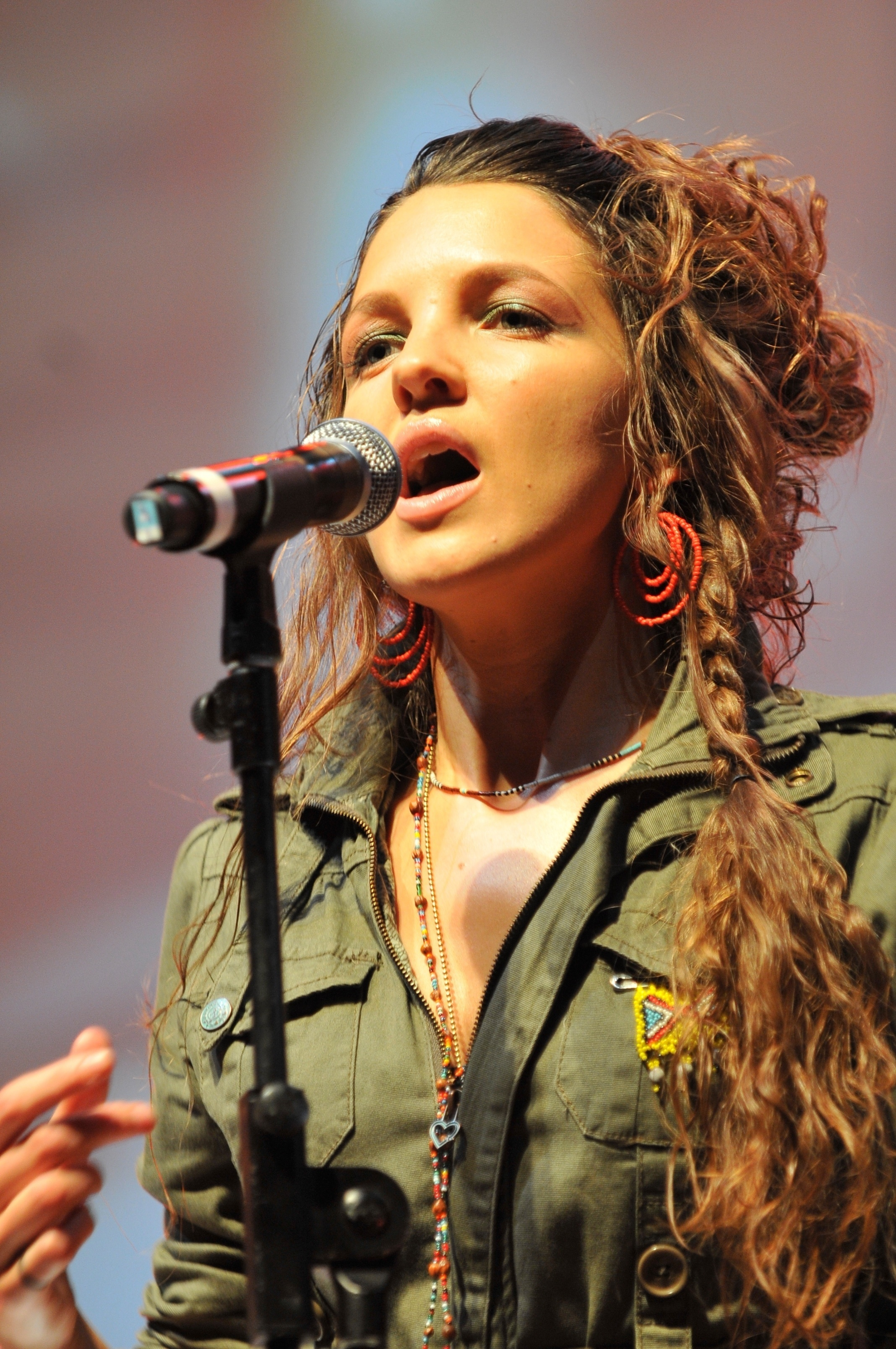
- Red performing live at the Royal Festival Hall in 2009

Background information
- Born: Natascha Eleonoré Bruce; Stuttgart
- Genres: Trip hop; dub; acoustic; experimental; electronica; downtempo; glitch
- Occupations: Singer; songwriter; lyricist
- Instrument: Vocals
- Years active: 2008–present
- Website: arubaredmusic.com

Aruba Red (born Natascha Eleonoré Bruce) is a British alt-soul and trip-hop musician named after a female pirate legend (which was invented by the Anheuser-Busch company, which gave the name to a beer). She has described her sound as "alternative soul music centered around themes of transformation and healing, influenced by trip hop, minimalist electronica, glitch, soul, acoustic folk, and dub".

== Early life ==
Aruba Red is the daughter of musician Jack Bruce, who came to prominence with the 1960s group Cream.

== Career ==
=== 2008–2015 ===
Aruba Red first appeared as a featured artist on Nitin Sawhney's album London Undersound, released on Cooking Vinyl in 2008, on the track "Last Train to Midnight", which she co-wrote. This collaboration was born out of Aruba Red being selected to work on Sawhney's project Aftershock London, which led to an 18-month residency at London's Southbank Centre with artists including Camilo Tirado, Riz MC, Ayanna Witter-Johnson, and Sam Carter.

Other collaborations and features include Riz MC's 2011 album MICroscope ("All of You"). She also collaborated with Jamaican Reggae Artist Jah Cure on her track "Light Up," released on the Jamaican record label TAD's, which was played on Irie FM, alongside her collaboration "Struggling" with reggae artist Jah Mason. A video was shot for "Light Up Light Up" in Montego Bay. The video was directed by Aruba Red's sister, Kyla Simone Bruce.

Aruba Red has toured with Maverick Sabre, Natty, Fat Freddy's Drop, and Ms. Dynamite. Aruba Red has performed at festivals including Glastonbury Festival, Boardmasters Festival, Big Chill Festival, Freeze Festival, One Love Festival, Rise Festival, and Thailand's International Hot Air Balloon Festival.

In 2012, Aruba Red released an EP titled Demos in Disguise independently via Ditto Music. Initially, the release was only available in digital format; a physical edition was later made available in 2013, featuring several bonus tracks. The digital version of the release features five original songs, whereas the limited "Red String," and the physical edition features eight original tracks and an acoustic mashup cover version of Nirvana's song "Something in the Way" and Ladysmith Black Mambazo's "Homeless." There is also a live performance version of this cover featuring guitarist Charlie Laffer and cellist Ayanna Witter-Johnson.

She recorded backing vocals for her father's last album, Silver Rails, which was released on March 24, 2014, on Esoteric Records.

In March 2015, Aruba Red was featured on "Rip Me," a song released by Halflife, the collaborative project between Riz MC and dubstep producer DJ Distance. In the same month, Aruba also wrote and recorded an exclusive song with Nitin Sawhney for Sawhney's BBC Radio 2 show Spins the Globe. The track "Fractured Heart" was written about the last few days Aruba spent with her late father.

On October 24, 2015, Aruba Red performed "We're Going Wrong" and "Folksong" at her father's tribute concert, Sunshine of Your Love - A Concert Celebrating the Life and Music of Jack Bruce, which she co-produced with Nitin Sawhney. Over £30,000 was raised for Bruce's local children's hospice, EACH.

=== 2018–present ===
After taking a hiatus from making music professionally, losing her father and becoming a mother, Aruba Red made her comeback releasing an EP entitled Holy Waters independently via Ditto Music. The EP features guest production from Nitin Sawhney and guitar by Phil Manzanera. The EP reached number 7 in the Top 10 iTunes Soul/R&B charts on its release date. It received positive reviews from Tinnitist, The Filtered Excellence, Mixmag, and music blog Mystic Sons.

On 19 September online music magazine Tinnitist premiered "Goddess Vibes", the first music video from Holy Waters, which became the website's most viewed song of 2018.

Aruba Red signed a publishing deal with Warner/Chappell Music on 8 November 2018.

In June 2019, Aruba Red was awarded the Transmission Fund Grant by Help Musicians UK to support the writing of her new album.

On New Year's Day 2020, Aruba Red released a visual for her song "Violet Electric" featuring Phil Manzanera.

In February 2020 Aruba Red released her live video "Blue" filmed at the Vortex Jazz Club on Blue Monday.

On 6 March 2020, Aruba Red released her EP Shadow Work, which received positive reviews from At the Barrier, PauzeRadio, and Spiral Earth. This release was followed with Aruba Red's debut headline concert at St Pancras Old Church on 11 March.

=== Mental health ===
On 2 November 2019, Aruba Red spoke at BBC Introducing Live on a panel discussing mental health in the music industry and in December 2019 she featured on the Elevate Music Podcast, discussing inter-generational patterns around addiction and co-dependency.

In February 2020 she was interviewed on BBC Radio Sussex about her own experiences battling depression and escaping an abusive relationship and using art to heal.

On 27 April 2020, Aruba Red launched her Meditation Mondays series on Instagram after hosting a guided meditation for the shesaid.so collective.
