= London Undersound =

Studio album by Nitin Sawhney
- Released: 13 October 2008
- Label: Cooking Vinyl
- Producer: Nitin Sawhney

Nitin Sawhney chronology
Philtre (2005)	London Undersound (2008)	Last Days of Meaning (2011)

Singles from London Undersound
- 1. "Distant Dreams" Released: October 2008; 2. "My Soul" Released: February 2009

London Undersound is the eighth studio album by British musician Nitin Sawhney. It was released on 13 October 2008, by Cooking Vinyl.

It includes collaborations with Paul McCartney, Natty, Imogen Heap, Reena Bhardwaj, Ojos de Brujo, Anoushka Shankar, Tina Grace, Faheem Mazhar, Aruba Red, and Roxanne Tataei.

== Reception ==
Reviewed by the BBC's Chris Jones as "an album with its heart firmly in the right place".

On German radio DLR Kultur, the album was reviewed in the programme Radiofeuilleton as "CD of the week" for the week from 13 October to 18 October 2008.

== Track listing ==
No.	Title	Length
1.	"Days of Fire" (feat. Natty)	3:14
2.	"October Daze" (feat. Tina Grace)	3:26
3.	"Bring It Home" (feat. Imogen Heap)	5:09
4.	"Interlude I – Ghost Image"	0:25
5.	"My Soul" (feat. Paul McCartney)	4:03
6.	"Interlude II – Soledad"	0:41
7.	"Distant Dreams" (feat. Roxanne Tataei)	3:12
8.	"Interlude III – Street Sounds"	0:08
9.	"Shadowland" (feat. Ojos de Brujo)	3:31
10.	"Daybreak" (feat. Faheem Mazhar)	2:34
11.	"Interlude IV – Identity"	0:12
12.	"Ek Jaan" (feat. Reena Bhardwaj)	2:13
13.	"Transmission" (feat. Tina Grace)	3:13
14.	"Interlude V – Tension"	0:15
15.	"Last Train to Midnight" (feat. Aruba Red)	3:46
16.	"Interlude VI – Ronald Gray"	0:21
17.	"Firmament"	3:52
18.	"Charu Keshi Rain" (feat. Anoushka Shankar)	4:01
Total length:		44:25
