= Orangutan (film) =

2026 American nature documentary film about orangutans

- Official release poster
- Directed by: Mark Linfield; Vanessa Berlowitz
- Produced by: Mark Linfield; Vanessa Berlowitz; Roy Conli; Nitin Sawhney
- Narrated by: Josh Gad
- Cinematography: Tom Rowland
- Music by: Nitin Sawhney
- Production companies: Disneynature; Wildstar Films
- Distributed by: Disney+
- Release date: April 22, 2026
- Running time: 81 minutes
- Country: United States
- Language: English

Orangutan is a 2026 American nature documentary film about orangutans directed by Mark Linfield and Vanessa Berlowitz and narrated by Josh Gad. It is the nineteenth nature documentary to be released under the Disneynature label. The film was released as a Disney+ exclusive on Earth Day April 22, 2026.

== Premise ==
Orangutan is set high in the treetops of Southeast Asia, where a mysterious and magnificent community filled with playful personalities live.

== Production ==
Josh Gad served as the narrator of Disneynature's documentary about orangutans. Mark Linfield and Vanessa Berlowitz directed and produced the film for producer Roy Conli. Linfield and Berlowitz previously directed Disneynature's Elephant (2020) and Tiger (2024). In March 2026, it was revealed that Nitin Sawhney would compose the film's score. Sawhney previously composed the score for Tiger. The soundtrack was released alongside the film on April 22, 2026.

== Release ==
Orangutan was released as a Disney+ exclusive on Earth Day April 22, 2026.

== Reception ==
Alex Reif of Laughing Place gave a positive review, summarizing that the film "is a joyful, funny, and quietly profound Earth Day celebration that reminds us how much we have in common with our distant cousins in the treetops". Sarah Woloski of Skywalking Through Neverland also gave a positive review, writing "visually, Orangutan is stunning. The cinematography immerses you in a vibrant, layered jungle ecosystem filled with life. From sweeping canopy shots to intimate close-ups, the film captures both serenity and tension; like the moment Indah narrowly escapes a lurking tiger, or when full-grown 200 pound males barrel through the treetops in dramatic territorial displays." Sean Boelman of Fandom Wire gave a negative review, writing the film "represents a new low, offering little more than the bare minimum that audiences expect from a nature documentary".
