= Reena Bhardwaj =

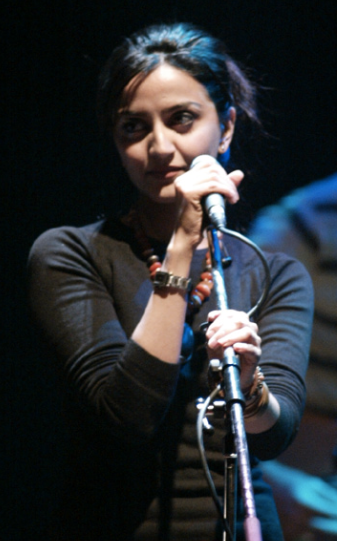
- Reena Bhardwaj

Background information
- Born: London, United Kingdom
- Genres: Traditional music, Pop music, World music, Bollywood music
- Occupation: Singer/songwriter/recording artist
- Years active: 2003–present
- Website: web.archive.org/web/20070809163708/http://www.reenabhardwaj.com/

Reena Bhardwaj is a British singer, songwriter and recording artist best known for her collaborations with A. R. Rahman and Nitin Sawhney. Versatile to genre and language, her repertoire includes a variety of Indian Traditional, Bollywood, World and Popular styles sung in various Indian languages (Hindi, Punjabi, Bengali, Tamil, Telugu) and English.

== Early years and education ==
Reena Bhardwaj was born and raised in London. From a very young age she displayed an intrinsic flair for the Indian arts, especially music and dance. She trained in the North Indian Classical Dance form Kathak and started performing on stage from the age of 9. During her teens, focus shifted to singing and she began to impress audiences as she sang complex compositions effortlessly. It was her natural vocal talent that eventually drew the attention of some of the world's leading pioneers of music, both in India and the UK.

An avid academic, Reena Bhardwaj chose to pursue a professional career in Business Management, while continuing to develop her musical interests on the side. She won a sponsorship on the Windsor Fellowship Management program and went on to graduate with Bachelor's and master's degrees from the London School of Economics. She briefly worked in corporate marketing and communications in the City of London.

== Musical career ==
Reena describes her musical career as a "turn of fate" which came about while pursuing her master's degree at the London School of Economics, when she received an unexpected call from her most favourite Indian Composer, AR Rahman.

With Rahman, she recorded her debut song, "Yeh Rishta" for the Bollywood film soundtrack Meenaxi: A Tale of Three Cities directed by MF Hussain, which catapulted her from the world of academics to the top of the Indian Music charts. She became the first British Asian Artist to be nominated for a Zee Cine Award for Best Playback Singer and the MTV Immies Award for Best New Talent of 2004.

Next she sang "Baba Kichhu Tha", a Tamil romantic duet with one of South India's most revered playback singers, S. P. Balasubrahmanyam for the Rajinikanth and Manisha Koirala starrer Baba.

Reena has featured on a number of AR Rahman’s Bollywood and Tamil/Telugu film soundtracks including Mangal Pandey: The Rising, Sakkarakatti and most recently she sang the beautiful song Khilli Re for the Mani Ratnam, Aishwarya Rai and Abhishek Bachchan starrer, Raavan, also by Rahman.

Reena's has been a regular collaborator with British Asian Composer/Producer Nitin Sawhney, an association that began with her soulful rendition of the epic Indian poem "Heer" by Waris Shah for Sawhney's 2003 album Human (V2). She went on to co-write the popular song "Mausam" for Sawhney's 2006 album Philtre (V2) alongside memorable performances on "Koyal – Songbird" and "The Search". She appears again on Sawhney's London Undersound in which she expresses her feelings about growing up in London by co-writing the track "Ek Jaan" and sings alongside Sir Paul McCartney in "My Soul".

Reena has toured extensively with Sawhney and his band and has performed at some of the world's most culturally elite venues including the Glastonbury Festival, WOMAD in Taormina (Sicily), Jazz Café, The Barbican Centre, The Royal Festival Hall, The Roundhouse for the BBC Electric Proms in 2008. One of her most notable performances was The BBC Proms 2007 at The Royal Albert Hall where she appeared alongside Nitin Sawhney, Natacha Atlas, & Anoushka Shankar.

She has also lent her voice to Sawhney's film scores, including Channel 4’s Second Generation, Bharat Bala Production's Hari Om, and the 1929 Silent Indian Classic, A Throw of Dice by Franz Osten, which premiered with the London Symphony Orchestra and subsequently performed with national orchestras in the Netherlands, Italy, New Zealand, US and Canada.

She has collaborated with the UK's biggest dance duo Basement Jaxx, Basement Jaxx, renowned percussion king Trilok Gurtu, Talvin Singh and award-winning British Songwriter Guy Chambers. Her songs feature on various compilation CDs (Ministry of Sound’s, Angel Beach; Pathaan's Indian Sunset) and Sony Legacy's 2009 Compilation CD The Best of AR Rahman.

== Discography ==
“Baba Kichchu", Music: A R Rahman, Film: Baba (2002)
“Tak Dheen" Music: A R Rahman, Bombay Dreams (2003)
“Heer", Nitin Sawhney, Human (2003)
“Falling" Aqualung & Nitin Sawhney, Human (2003)
“Yeh Rishta", Music: A R Rahman, Film: Meenaxi: A Tale of Three Cities (2004)
“Mausam", co-written with Nitin Sawhney, Philtre (2005)
“Koyal (Songbird)", Nitin Sawhney, Philtre (2005)
“The Search", Nitin Sawhney, Philtre (2005)
“Dead Man", Nitin Sawhney, Philtre (2005)
“Sandesa", Nitin Sawhney & The London Symphony Orchestra, Film: Franz_Osten's A Throw of Dice (2005)
“Everybody", Basement Jaxx, Crazy Itch Radio (2005)
“Main Vari Vari", Music: A R Rahman, Film: Mangal Pandey: The Rising (2006)
“Naan Epodhu", Music: A R Rahman, Film: Sakkarakatti (2008)
“My Soul", Paul McCartney & Nitin Sawhney, London Undersound (2008)
“Ek Jaan", co-written with Nitin Sawhney, London Undersound (2008)
”Khilli Re", Music: A R Rahman, Film: Raavan (2010)
“Puli Gharshana", Music: A R Rahman, Film: Komaram Puli (2010)
Other film soundtracks and compilations in which Reena features:

The Best of A R Rahman, Sony Legacy (2009)
Aaoji: Classic Sufi Hits, Sony Music (2009)
Life Goes On Music: Soumik Dutta, Storm Glass Productions (2009)
In the Mind of Nitin Sawhney, District 6 (2007)
Angel Beach, Ministry of Sound (2005)
American Daylight, Amaan Ali Khan (2005)
Frank Osten's A Throw of Dice, Nitin Sawhney & The London Symphony Orchestra (2005)
Hari Om Film Score: Nitin Sawhney, Bharat Bala Productions (2004)
Second Generation, Film Score: Nitin Sawhney, Channel 4 (2003)
Indian Sunset DJ Pathaan (2003)
