= Mark Linfield =

British writer (born 1968)

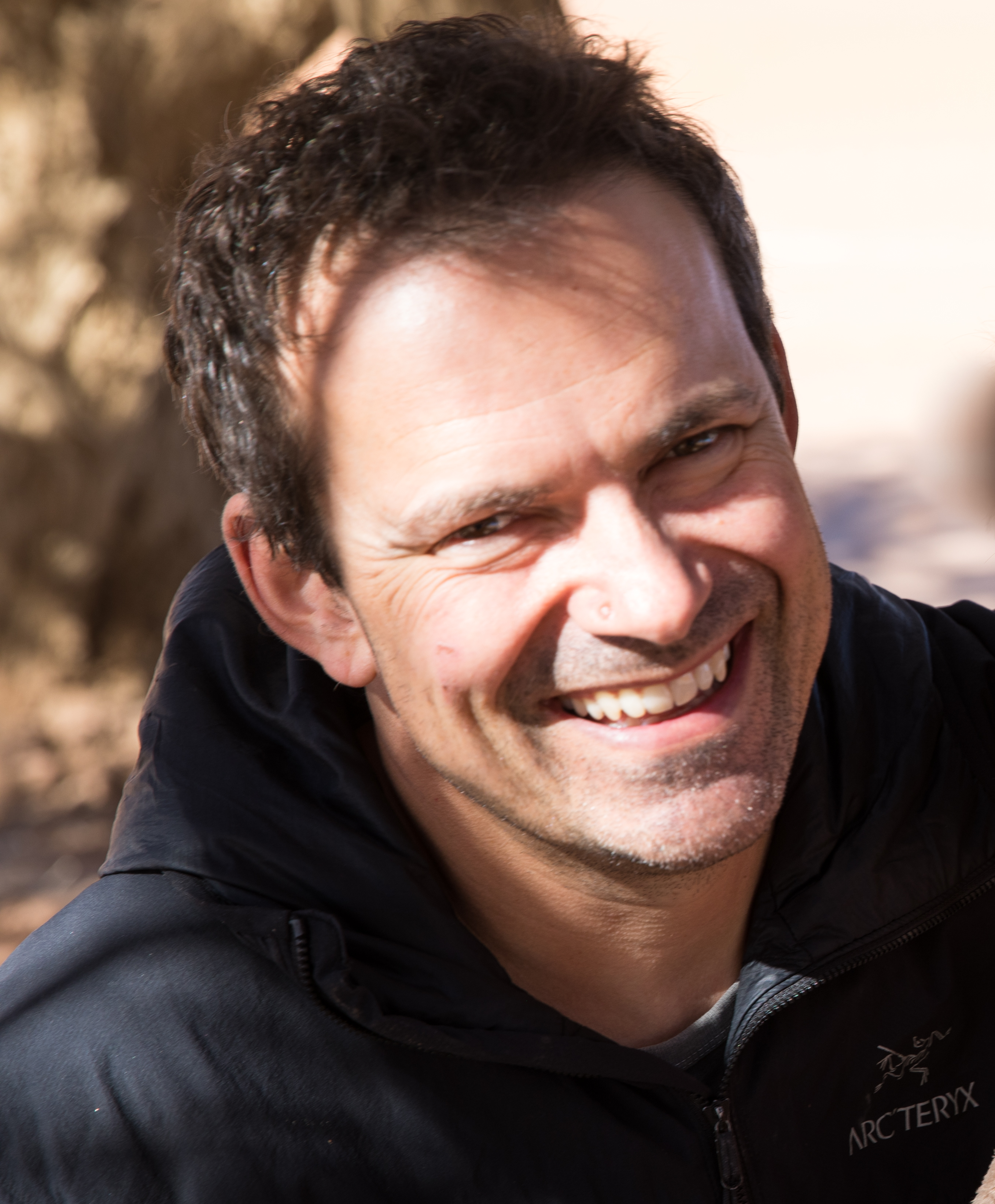
Mark Linfield

Mark Linfield (born 6 June 1968) is a British writer, producer and director of nature documentaries for cinema and television. He is best known for his work with the BBC Natural History Unit as a producer of two episodes of the television series Planet Earth (2006) and as writer and co-director of the associated feature film Earth (2007).

== Career ==
Mark co-founded Wildstar Films in 2018 after 30 years of directing and producing wildlife films. He is currently on the senior creative team for several series at Wildstar and is directing a feature-length film for Disneynature.

After studying zoology at the University of Oxford, Mark began his career fronting a film about gorillas in the Congo. After several years with the BBC, Mark joined independent production company, Green Umbrella, where he produced and directed many films for BBC strands The Natural World and Wildlife on One including The Temple Troop; Gelada Baboons – The Battles of Braveheart; Orangutans – The High Society; and Capuchins – The Monkey Puzzle.

Mark returned to the BBC in 2000 to produce and direct on the BAFTA-nominated Life of Mammals, on which he travelled the world with Sir David Attenborough. Mark followed this with two episodes of the hit TV series Planet Earth, winning a Primetime Emmy for the opening show "Pole to Pole". Mark followed this as producer/director on Frozen Planet.

For the last 10 years, Mark has been directing and co-directing feature length wildlife films for Disneynature, including Chimpanzee, Monkey Kingdom, Elephant and Earth.

== Personal life ==
Linfield lives in Bristol with his wife Vanessa Berlowitz and their son, Cam.

== Film and TV credits ==
- Natural World

Episode: "Journey to the Dark Heart" (1993)
Episode: "The Temple Troop (1997)
Episode: "Orang-utans: The High Society" (1998)

- Triumph of Life (2000)
- The Life of Mammals (2002)
- Wildlife on One

Episode: "Gelada Baboons: The Battles of Braveheart (2000)
Episode: "Capuchins: The Monkey Puzzle" (2004)

- Planet Earth

Episode: "From Pole to Pole" (2006)
Episode: "Seasonal Forests" (2006)

- Earth (2007)
- Frozen Planet (2011)
- Chimpanzee (2012)
- Monkey Kingdom (2015)
- Elephant (2020)
- Tiger (2024)
- Orangutan (2026)
