= Guitar Star =

- Genre: Talent show
- Presented by: Edith Bowman
- Judges: Huey Morgan; Nitin Sawhney; Helen Sanderson
- Country of origin: United Kingdom
- Original language: English
- No. of series: 1
- No. of episodes: 9

Production
- Running time: 60 minutes (inc. adverts)
- Production companies: Somethin’ Else and Motion Content Group

Original release
- Network: Sky Arts
- Release: 9 June 2015 – 2 August 2016

Guitar Star is a talent show that has aired on Sky Arts from 9 June 2015 to 2 August 2016 and is presented by Edith Bowman, with judges Huey Morgan, Nitin Sawhney and Helen Sanderson, as they scour across the UK to unearth a world-class guitarist. The nine-part series searches the UK and Ireland for talented guitarists for the chance to perform on the main stage at this year’s Latitude festival, a major music festival in the UK. The judges look for guitar players that are willing to jam, strum and pluck their way to victory.

A second and final series was confirmed in March 2016, and will be screened in July. The deadline for applications ended Thursday 10 March. Tony Visconti, George Benson and Miloš Karadaglić were confirmed as the new set of mentors.

== Format ==
The nine-part series is presented by Edith Bowman and judged by industry experts Huey Morgan, Nitin Sawhney and Helen Sanderson. The first stage of the competition will consist of four televised auditions which took place in four national centres across the UK and Ireland. After the auditions, 16 guitarists will be whittled down to 4 by the judges. The semi-finalists will be joined alongside world-famous guitar legends in a recording studio to perfect their sound. Along the way the hopeful’s ability will be tested across a range of music genres. They will be mentored by some of the world’s biggest guitar stars and play in iconic music venues.

== Auditions ==
The competition was open to people of all ages, ability and styles including: rock, jazz, acoustic, folk or classical. The closing date for entries was 31 March 2015 The judges' auditions were held across four venues. Auditions began in Cardiff on 9 April 2015 and ended in London on 4 May 2015.

City	Date	Venue
Cardiff	9 April 2015	Royal Welsh College of Music and Drama
Dublin	19 April 2015	IMMA – Irish Museum of Modern Art
Glasgow	28 April 2015	Òran Mór
London	4 May 2015	Queen Elizabeth Foyer Southbank Center
