= Rise Festival =

Music festival held in London, England

Rise was a free anti-racism music festival held in London, England, from 1996 to 2008. Originally organised as an anti-racism festival by the Trades Union Congress (TUC), it was revived as such by the former mayor of London, Ken Livingstone. In June 2008, the Greater London Authority, under newly elected mayor Boris Johnson, removed the anti-racist message of the festival. Subsequently, the trade unions UNISON and Unite the Union withdrew their festival funding, and Johnson cancelled the festival in April 2009, blaming lack of sponsorship.

When, in 1996, the festival was set up, it was originally called "Respect". While primarily a music festival, it also worked to encourage trade unions, voluntary groups, charities and community organisations to highlight their work and ideas concerning equality and the promotion of anti-racism.

The original event took part in Finsbury Park and featured artists Chumbawamba, Fun-Da-Mental, Asian Dub Foundation and Incognito. In 1997, the featured musicians were Luciano, Audioweb, the Fun Lovin' Criminals and Dreadzone and the event took place in Victoria Park, Hackney.

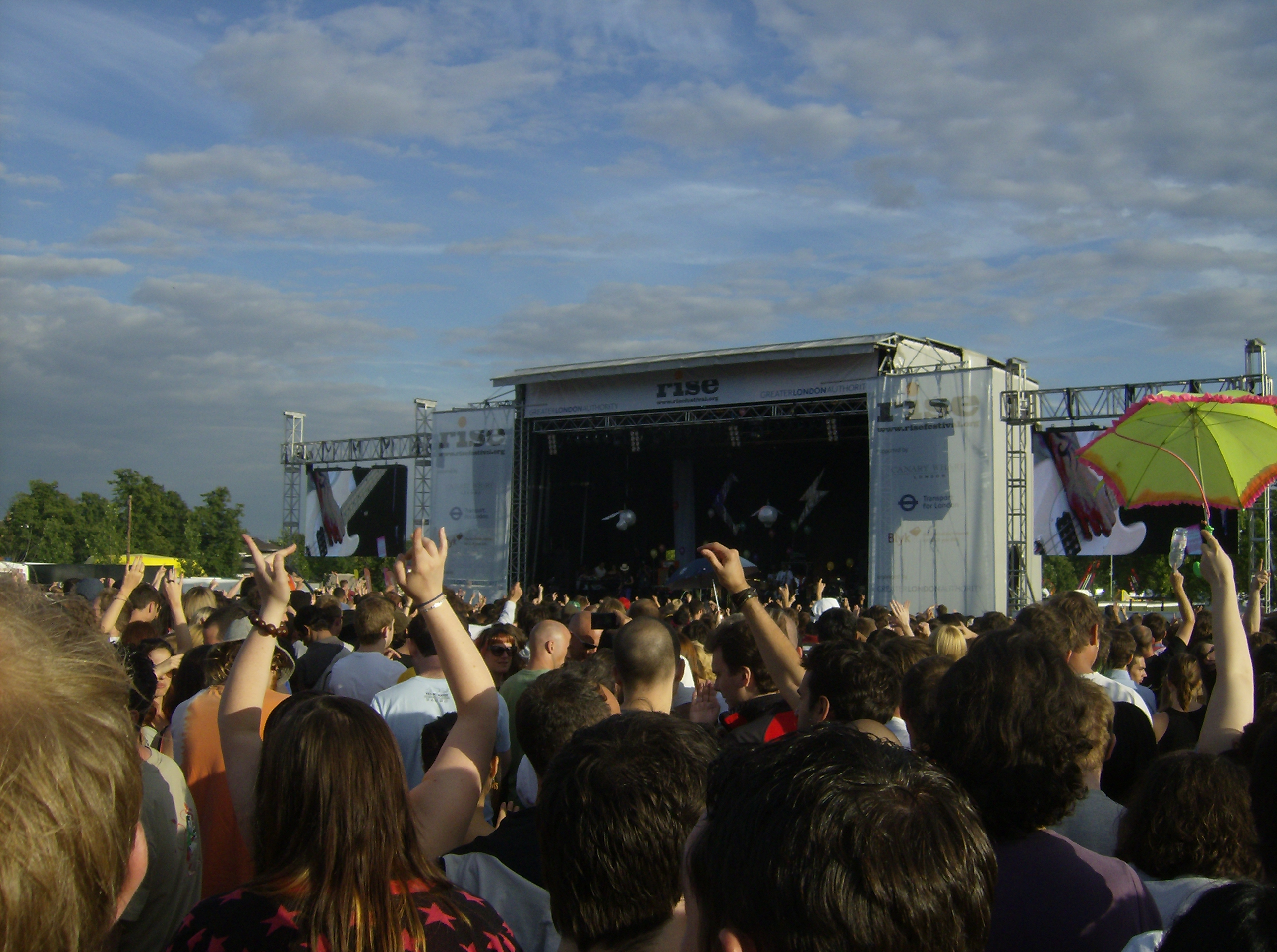
CSS at the 2008 Rise festival

There was no event between 1998 and 2000, but in May 2000 Ken Livingstone was elected mayor with a manifesto pledge to organise that the anti-racist festival become a yearly event.

The first festival, dubbed "Respect", under Livingstone's tenure, took place in 2001 and attracted around 60,000 people. Since then attendances have been reached around 100,000. After the launch of the political party also called Respect, the festival changed its name to Rise for 2005. After the 7 July 2005 London bombings it was renamed London United, but changed back to just Rise in 2008.

The 2008 festival saw headliner Jimmy Cliff cut off during his set when it overran past the 8:30 pm curfew time, with the sound system switched off halfway through a performance of "Rivers of Babylon", causing him and the band to leave the stage in silence.

In 2010, Rise was given new life as a people's festival named UpRise with the venue again in Finsbury Park, supported by unions such as SERTUC, UNISON, NUT and Unite the Union among others.

== List of festivals ==
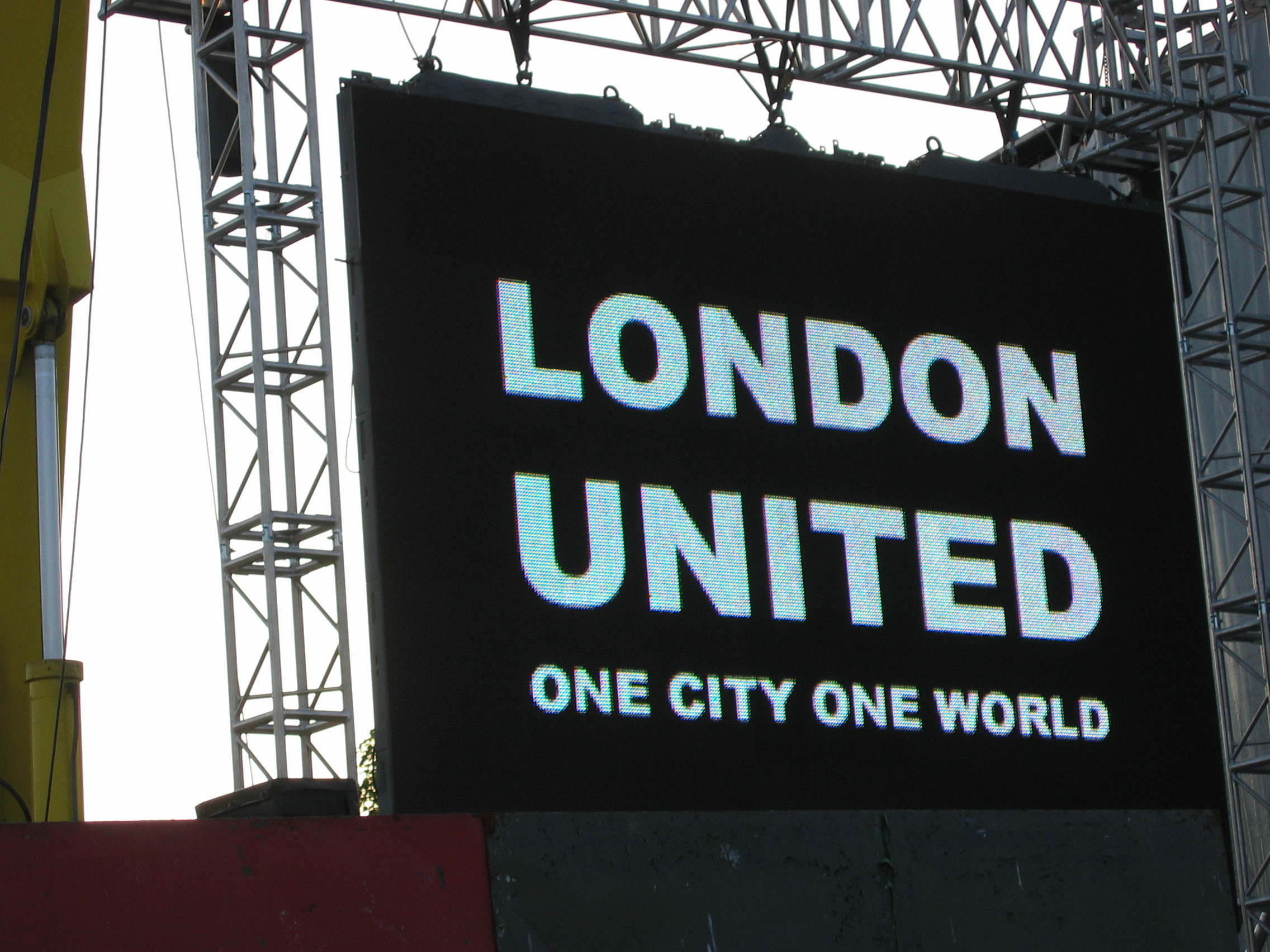
The London United Festival, July 2005

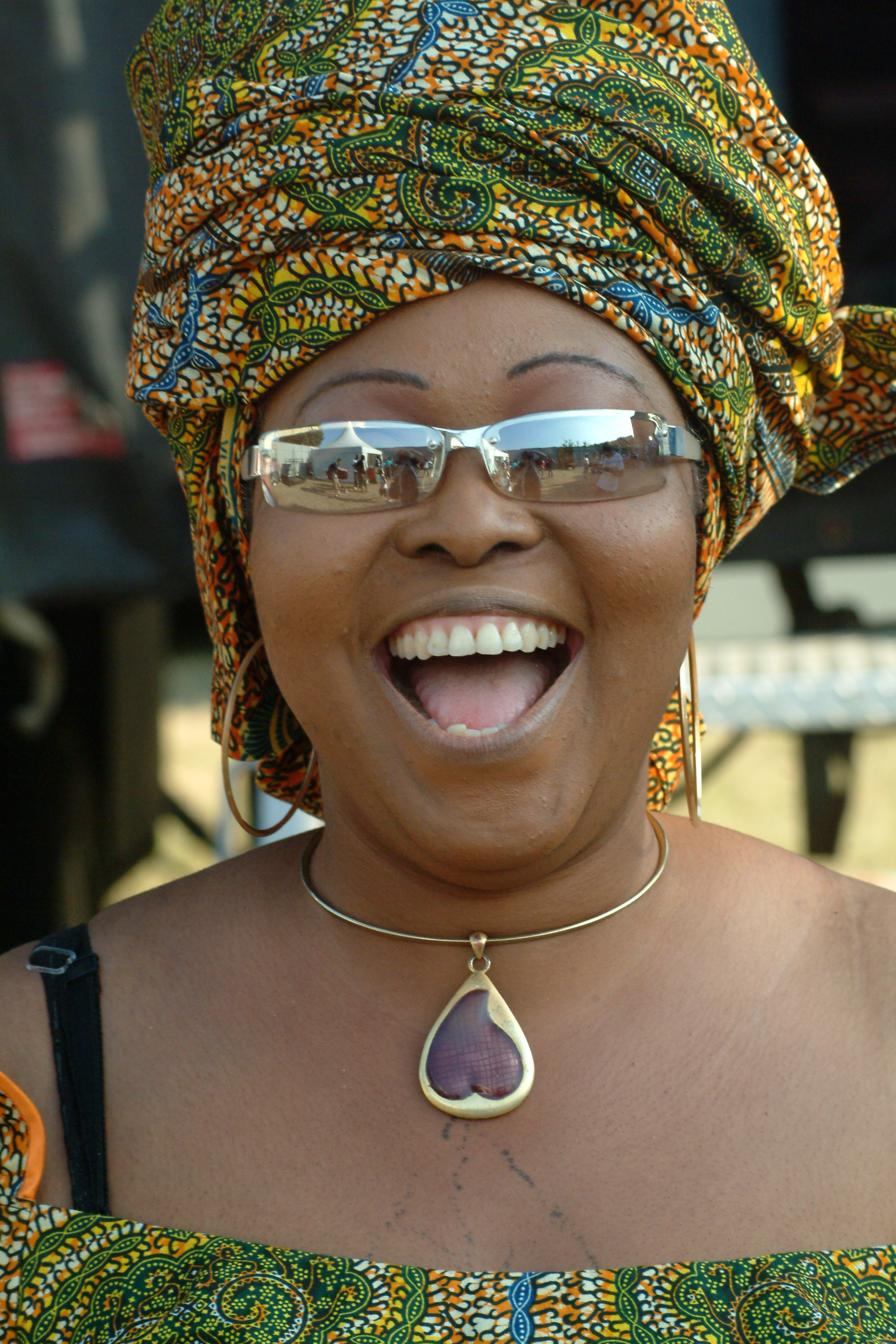
Ammy Coco From Togo at the festival in 2005

- 20 July 1996 – Finsbury Park – Chumbawamba, Fun-Da-Mental, Asian Dub Foundation, Incognito
- 12 July 1997 – Victoria Park, Hackney – The Specials, Luciano, Audioweb, Fun Lovin' Criminals, Dreadzone
- 21 July 2001 – Finsbury Park – Blue, Run DMC, Mis-Teeq, Desmond Dekker
- 20 July 2002 – Victoria Park, Hackney – De La Soul
- 19 July 2003 – Millennium Dome – Public Enemy, Gregory Isaacs, Panjabi MC, Estelle
- 17 July 2004 – Victoria Park, Hackney – Apache Indian, Tim Westwood, Big Brovaz, Lady Sovereign, Jay Sean
- 16 July 2005 – Burgess Park, Peckham – Lemar, Goldie Lookin Chain, Raghav
- 8 July 2006 – Finsbury Park – Graham Coxon, Sway, the Buzzcocks, Killa Kela, Roy Ayers, The Wailers, Common, Swami
- 15 July 2007 – Finsbury Park – Kelis, Jamelia, The Skatalites, Saint Etienne, Noisettes, K'naan
- 13 July 2008 – Finsbury Park – CSS, Jimmy Cliff
- 12 July 2009 – Finsbury Park – picnic in the park in protest of the cancellation of Rise
- 3 October 2010 – Finsbury Park – UpRise festival featuring Ty, Omar, Yabba Funk, Imaani, Aruba Red, United Vibrations, Jimmy Screech
- 25 September 2011 – Dalston – UpRise festival – ESKA, Miss Baby Sol, Cynikal, Sara Pascoe, Aruba Red, Fiona Bevan
- 30 September 2012 – Hackney Wick – UpRise festival – Ava Vidal, Danica Hunter, Potent Whisper
