= Stuntman (2018 film) =

2019 film directed by Daniel Myrick

- Original film poster, as released at the 2018 LAFF
- Directed by: Kurt Mattila
- Written by: Kurt Mattila
- Produced by: Kurt Mattila; Eddie Braun; Steven Golebiowksi
- Cinematography: Keith Dunkerley
- Edited by: Kurt Mattila
- Music by: Jeremy Zuckerman
- Production companies: Seven Bucks Productions; Driven Pictures; Disney+ Original Films
- Distributed by: Endeavor Content; Disney+
- Release dates: September 20, 2018 (Los Angeles); July 23, 2021 (United States)
- Running time: 85 minutes
- Country: United States
- Language: English

Stuntman is a 2018 American documentary film, written and directed by Kurt Mattila. The events of the movie follow stunt performer Eddie Braun's recreation of Robert "Evel" Knievel's failed Skycycle X-2 jump over Snake River Canyon in Idaho.

Originally released at the 2018 LA Film Festival in September of the same year by Endeavor Content, the film's wide-release was distributed by The Walt Disney Company through their Disney+ streaming service as a Disney+ Original on July 23, 2021. The film was removed from Disney+ on May 26, 2023.

== Premise ==
With no financial support from any industry, stunt perfumer Eddie Braun sets out to honor the legacy of his childhood idol, Evel Knievel. After the opportunity arises to jump the Snake River Canyon, Braun spends his life savings on his life-long dream. Enlisting the help of Scott Truax, the son of the original NASA rocket scientist who build Knievel's steam-powered rocket, the pair alongside the film crew experience and emotional journey unlike anything they've previously experienced.

== Cast ==
- Eddie Braun
- Scott Truax
- Elia P. Popov

== Production ==
Initially announced in July 2018 as one of the featured documentaries at the year's Los Angeles Film Festival, the official release date was confirmed later that September. Described as an action movie-documentary, the film portrays the 55-year-old's attempts to complete a stunt that his childhood hero failed. Created and directed by Kurt Mattila, Dwayne Johnson and Dany Garcia served as executive producers, along with Alexander Dervin, Julie Benson, Hiram Garcia, Brian Gewirtz, and Kelly Knievel (Evel’s son). The project was a joint-venture production with a partnership between Driven Pictures and Seven Bucks Productions.

Johnson stated, “I’ve been lucky to work with some amazing stunt performers over the course of my career, the entire stunt community is the backbone of our business." Garcia stated that the film is "a powerful experience that exposes the level of passion and fearlessness required by these invaluable stunt actors." Endeavor Content handled distribution at the film festival.

In July 2021, following The Walt Disney Company's purchase of world-wide distribution, a new poster was released alongside the debut of the first official trailer. In comparison, Disney's version is concise and streamlined, while also not including the production details of the film as LAFF's did towards the bottom.

== Release ==
The film premiered at the 2018 LA Film Festival on September 23, 2018. In June 2021, it was announced that The Walt Disney Company had purchased distribution rights and would be releasing the film as a Disney+ Original. Stuntman was eventually released on July 23, 2021.

== Reception ==
=== Critical reception ===
According to review aggregator Rotten Tomatoes, 100% of 7 critics gave the film a positive review, with an average rating of 6.00/10.

Dennis Harvey of Variety found the documentary film to be an "ambitious vanity" project that is "admirably accomplished," praised the tension across the movie, but stated the film lacks emotional depth. Johnny Loftus of Decider called the project of Stuntman "admirable," complimented the revealing footage from the cameras on steam-powered rockets and board stunt vehicles, but said that the narrative is not emotional enough. Jennifer Green of Common Sense Media rated the film 3 out of 5 stars, complimented the depiction of positive messages, citing perseverance, and praised the presence of positive role models, stating Eddie Braun promotes tenacity, modesty, and bravery.

=== Accolades ===
Year	Award	Category	Recipient(s)	Result	Ref.
2018	Los Angeles Film Festival	Best Documentary Feature	Kurt Mattila	Won	
2018	Los Angeles Film Festival	Best Feature	Kurt Mattila	Nominated	
