= Beyond Skin =

Studio album by Nitin Sawhney
- Released: 13 September 1999
- Genres: Downtempo, drum and bass
- Length: 58:22
- Label: Outcaste

Nitin Sawhney chronology
Displacing the Priest (1996)	Beyond Skin (1999)	Spirit Dance (1999)

Beyond Skin is an album by English musician Nitin Sawhney. It was released on the Outcaste label in 1999. The album focuses largely on the theme of nuclear weapons; Sawhney states in the booklet that the album "has a timespan that runs backwards", beginning at "Broken Skin" with the India-Pakistan nuclear situation and ending at "Beyond Skin" with Robert Oppenheimer quoting the Bhagavad Gita — "Now I am become Death, the destroyer of worlds".

Sawhney also aims to question what constitutes one's identity – he writes in the liner notes for the album: "I believe in Hindu philosophy. I am not religious. I am a pacifist. I am a British Asian. My identity and my history are defined only by myself – beyond politics, beyond nationality, beyond religion, and Beyond Skin."

== Reception ==
Professional ratings
Review scores
Source	Rating
AllMusic	4.5/5 stars
The Guardian	4/5 stars
The Independent	5/5 stars
Muzik	4/5 stars
NME	8/10

Beyond Skin was included in the book 1001 Albums You Must Hear Before You Die.

== Track listing ==
1. "Broken Skin" (Sanchita Farruque, Nitin Sawhney) – 4:05
2. "Letting Go" (C. S. Gray, Sawhney) – 4:49
3. "Homelands" (Nina Miranda, Sawhney) – 6:00
4. "The Pilgrim" (Sawhney, Spek) – 4:29
5. "Tides" (Sawhney) – 5:06
6. "Nadia" (Sawhney) – 5:05
7. "Immigrant" (Sawhney) – 6:21
8. "Serpents" (Sawhney) – 6:17
9. "Anthem Without Nation" (Sawhney) – 5:48
10. "Nostalgia" (Sawhney) – 3:41
11. "The Conference" (Sawhney) – 2:53
12. "Beyond Skin" (Sawhney) – 3:48

== Charts ==
Chart performance for Beyond Skin
Chart (1999)	Peak position
UK Albums (Official Charts)	44
