= Nitin Sawhney =

British musician (born 1964)

Nitin Sawhney CBE
- Sawhney in 2017

Background information
- Born: 1964 (age 61–62); London, England
- Origin: Rochester, Kent, England
- Genres: Electronic; Asian Underground; nu jazz; drum and bass; trip hop; downtempo; R&B
- Occupations: Producer; songwriter; multi-instrumentalist; DJ; orchestral composer
- Website: nitinsawhney.com

Nitin Sawhney (/ˈnɪtɪn ˈsɔːni/ NIT-in SAW-nee; born 1964) is a British musician, producer and composer. A recipient of the Ivor Novello Lifetime Achievement award in 2017, among multiple international awards throughout his career. Sawhney's work combines Asian and other worldwide influences with elements of electronica and often explores themes such as multiculturalism, politics, and spirituality. Sawhney was also chair of the PRS Foundation and is a patron of film festivals, venues, and educational institutions. In 2021, he was an ambassador for the Royal Albert Hall. Sawhney has scored for and performed with orchestras, and collaborated with and written for several prominent musicians.

Often appearing as Artist in Residence, Curator or Musical Director at international festivals, Sawhney contributes to musical education, having acted as patron of the British Government's Access-to-music programme, the East London Film festival and, currently, Artis as well as acting as a judge for The Ivor Novello Awards, BAFTA, BIFA, and a new role as Patron for the PRS Foundation. He is a recipient of numerous honorary doctorates from British universities,is a fellow of LIPA and the Southbank University, an Associate of Sadler's Wells. In 2017, Sawhney received the Ivor Novello Lifetime Achievement award.

Having turned down an OBE in 2007, stating that it was associated with "a colonial past", Sawhney accepted a higher-grade CBE in the 2019 New Year Honours. He accepted it for his father, who he said had died regretting that Sawhney had rejected the OBE.

Since 2014, the publishing interest of Nitin Sawhney's catalogue has been represented by Reservoir Media Management.

== Early years ==
Nitin Sawhney was raised in Rochester, Kent, England, by first-generation British Indian parents. As a child he studied piano, classical and flamenco guitar, sitar and tabla. He has been quoted speaking about his early life as one of three brothers and his musical influences: "My mum and dad both listened to Indian classical music, but also flamenco, Cuban music, a lot of crooners and a lot of pop. My brothers listened to a lot of rock music. So, I was listening to everything from the Doors to Led Zeppelin and a lot of jazz." He is the cousin of Bollywood actress Lara Dutta.

He attended Sir Joseph Williamson's Mathematical School. Subsequently, he studied law at Liverpool University for a short time.

Sawhney moved to London, where he met up with old university friend Sanjeev Bhaskar; together they created the comedy team The Secret Asians. From 1996 to 1998, the pair were part of the award-winning BBC Radio sketch show Goodness Gracious Me which transferred to BBC TV in 1998 to 2001. Refocusing on music, Sawhney's solo career began in 1993, when he released his debut album, Spirit Dance, on his own label.

== Solo career ==
Sawhney has released more than 20 studio albums. He has received 17 national awards for his album work and is a recipient of the Ivor Novello Lifetime Achievement award.

In 1999, Sawhney released his fourth Gold-selling album, Beyond Skin, on London's Outcaste Records, which took a prestigious Mercury Music Prize nomination and won him the coveted South Bank Show Award. After a subsequent signing to Richard Branson's V2 Records, Sawhney released the Silver-certified Prophesy in 2001, winning a MOBO Award as well as a BBC Radio 3 Music Award. Sawhney's seventh album, Philtre, was released in May 2005, taking yet another BBC Radio 3 Award, and in 2008, his eighth album, London Undersound, released on Cooking Vinyl, featured artwork by Antony Gormley and performances from Paul McCartney, Anoushka Shankar, Imogen Heap and Natty, among many others.

Sawhney's 2011 studio work, Last Days of Meaning, previewed at the Royal Albert Hall in May 2011, centres on a character from actor, John Hurt, and follows the metaphorical, Dickensian journey of a lonely and intransigent man. His 2013 box-set release One Zero was recorded live-to-vinyl as a celebration of ten albums releases. Nitin's tenth studio album, Dystopian Dream, was released in November 2015, and his eleventh Immigrants came out in March 2021. His latest album IDENTITY was released in October 2023 with Warner Music.

He produced Anoushka Shankar's 2013 Grammy nominated album Traces of You, featuring Norah Jones, and also produced Jools Hollands' 2021 album Pianola. Piano & Friends.

== Music for film, television and video games ==
To date, Sawhney has scored more than sixty films, as well as many international TV programmes, ads and cinema trailers. He has written music for a wide variety of contexts, from dark, high-tension drama to light-hearted animatronics.

Sawhney has been commissioned to write the scores for a number of different projects. His music for Channel 4's Second Generation received a nomination for the Ivor Novello Award for Film and TV Composition. He has also scored ads for Nike and Sephora. In 2006, Sawhney composed a new symphony to accompany Franz Osten's 1929 silent film, A Throw of Dice, which premiered with the London Symphony Orchestra at the Barbican, London. Other notable works include composing for Oscar-nominated director Mira Nair's adaptation of Jhumpa Lahiri's, The Namesake, as well as scoring Natural Fantasia and Human Planet for the BBC.

His work for film and television has led Sawhney to gain recognition within the world of classical music. In 2001, Sawhney composed "Neural Circuits" for the Britten Sinfonia In 2002, he worked with Akram Khan and Anish Kapoor, scoring the music to Khan's choreographed work Kaash, which toured worldwide between 2002 and 2003. In 2004, Sawhney was commissioned by the City of Birmingham Symphony Orchestra to compose a new piece for their Harmony Project. His previous scores also include the new adaptation of Mahabharata by the Olivier Award- winning writer Stephen Clark, Simon McBurney's A Disappearing Number for Complicité, and first-time theatrical director Jonathan Holmes' Fallujah. Sawhney has continued to work with Akram Khan on Bahok, Vertical Road and iTMOi (in the mind of Igor).

Sawhney produced the music for the Ninja Theory video games Heavenly Sword and Enslaved: Odyssey to the West (both starring Andy Serkis).

Sawhney again worked with the London Symphony Orchestra for the Network/BFI re-master of Alfred Hitchcock's The Lodger, performed live at The Barbican Centre on 21 July 2012. Sawhney also scored Oscar-nominated director Deepa Mehta's adaptation of Salman Rushdie's book, Midnight's Children, released in October 2012 (US), and Vara: A Blessing and Japan in a Day.

Sawhney scored a five-episode series for the BBC's Natural History Department called Wonders of the Monsoon, which had its debut airing with the BBC in 2014. With other broadcasters and with its DVD release it has been re-titled Lands of the Monsoon. The series earned Sawhney a Royal Television Society award for best composer in February 2015. He subsequently scored Andy Serkis' (whom he has previously worked with) directorial debut Breathe (featuring Andrew Garfield and Claire Foy), which went on general release in October 2017, and Serkis' interpretation of The Jungle Book, titled Mowgli: Legend of the Jungle, for Netflix, released in November 2018. Sawhney scored the film What's Love Got to do with it?, released in 2022, starring Lily James, Shazad Latif and Emma Thompson, written by Jemima Khan and directed by Shekhar Kapur.

== Theatre and dance ==
Sawhney's album Dystopian Dream has been made into a full stage show with Sadler's Wells, co-devised with Honji Wang and Sébastien Ramirez, which premiered in Luxembourg on 29 September 2017. Sawhney's substantial theatre/dance credits include the scores for Complicité's Olivier Award-winning A Disappearing Number and Akram Khan's also Olivier Award-winning Zero Degrees, for which Nitin received a New York Performance and Dance Award for best score. After scoring Bahok for the Royal Ballet of China, Sawhney's composition for Khan's Vertical Road received a best new work award in Melbourne. Sawhney worked again with Belgian choreographer Sidi Larbi Cherkaoui on a production based on the life of Manga creator Tezuka and has worked with Akram Khan for iTMOi (in the mind of Igor) as part of the centenary Rites of Spring celebrations at Sadler's Wells. Sawhney directed and produced Indelible, a multi-installation experience at Sadler's Wells, as part of their "NoBody" programme.

In 2026 Sawhney presented Orbiting Orbital at the Schwarzman Centre in Oxford. Commissioned by the University of Oxford's Schwarzman Centre and inspired by Samantha Harvey's novel Orbital, the project combines existing and newly composed music by Sawhney with six new texts by Harvey, drawings by Antony Gormley and photographs by Mary McCartney.

== Acting, writing, directing, commentating ==
Sawhney's acting credits include the award-winning radio and BBC TV series, Goodness Gracious Me, for which he received a Sony Award as performer and writer, Meera Syal's Radio 4 mini-series, Masala FM and Confluence with Akram Khan. As a fledgling theatrical director, his work to date includes Confluence for Sadler's Wells and directing/writing workshops at London's National Theatre for his play, Trust. He has also written articles for UK broadsheets and appeared as a commentator on the BBC's Newsnight Review, Newsnight and HardTalk. Nitin Sawhney Spins the Globe is Sawhney's BBC Radio 2 show. Its fourth series was broadcast in March 2015.

Sawhney appeared as an industry expert in two series of the TV series Guitar Star for Sky Arts, as well as appearing in and working as music director on the Sky Arts series Tony Visconti's Unsigned Heroes, which aired in 2017.

Sawnhey served as executive producer of the 2022 documentary Hostile.

== Collaborations and remixes ==
Sawhney has remixed a wide variety of artists, including Sting, Natacha Atlas, Nusrat Fateh Ali Khan, Jeff Beck, Julian Lloyd Webber, Tina Grace and Paul McCartney (for McCartney's The Fireman project). He also collaborated with McCartney on a song called "My Soul", which appeared on Sawhney's London Undersound album, and on various Robert Miles projects such as Miles Gurtu and Organik as well as with American singer-songwriter Jacob Golden. His own work has been remixed by 4hero, Talvin Singh, MJ Cole and Quantic. He produced several songs on Cheb Mami's album Dellali. He co-produced the second album from songwriter Get Cape. Wear Cape. Fly entitled Searching for the Hows and Whys released through Atlantic Records. During 2006–2007, he wrote the music for Akram Khan and Sidi Larbi Cherkaoui's dance piece Zero Degrees; Antony Gormley created the set. He played keyboards on the 2022 Pink Floyd single "Hey, Hey, Rise Up!".

He has collaborated with Hindustani classical singers such as Pandit Jayanta Bose and Reena Bhardwaj on multiple occasions, performing at the Royal Albert Hall, Ocean music venue, and Victoria and Albert Museum.

Sawhney had his own BBC Radio 2 series, Nitin Sawhney Spins the Globe, which was commissioned for three series. The series has seen him collaborate with the likes of Joss Stone, Bassekou Koyate, One Eskimo, Diana Yukawa and David Arnold. Sawhney produced and co-wrote Anoushka Shankar's 2013 album Traces of You, which featured Norah Jones. He also co-produced an album by the semi-classical all female string quartet Bond.

== Awards ==
1998

- EMMA Award for Displacing The Priest

2000

- Asian Pop Award for Best Mainstream Fusion Act for Beyond Skin
- Technics Mercury Music Prize Nomination for album of the year for Beyond Skin
- South Bank Award for Popular Music for Beyond Skin

2001

- BBC Asia Award for Music for Prophesy
- MOBO Award for Prophesy
- Boundary Crossing Award, BBC Radio 3 Music Awards for Prophesy

2002

- Media Personality of the Year nomination, RIMA Awards
- EMMA Award for Prophesy
- Muso Award for Prophesy

2003

- Commission for Racial Equality Award

2004

- Ivor Novello Award Nomination for Best Film score for TV

2005

- Boundary Crossing Award, BBC Radio 3 Music Awards for Philtre

2006

- Honorary Graduate Degree from South Bank University, London
- Laurence Olivier Award in Contemporary Dance (Zero Degrees – scored for Akram Khan)

2007

- Honorary degree of Doctor of Music from the University of Kent

2008

- Companionship From the Liverpool Institute for Performing Arts in recognition of his contribution to the world of art and entertainment.
- UK Asian Music Awards – "Commitment to Scene"

2009

- UK Asian Music Awards – "Best Alternative Act"
- Honorary Doctorate from the University of Sussex
- Honorary Doctorate from the University of Roehampton
- Honorary Doctorate from the University of Staffordshire
- "Best Music (Melhor Trilha Sonora)" Jury Award Nomination for Jean Charles (2009)

2011

- "Best Specialist Factual" BAFTA Nomination for Human Planet
- "Best Original Video Game Score" Ivor Novello Award Nomination for Enslaved: Odyssey to the West (Ninja Theory)

2012

- "Outstanding Dance Production" Dora Mavor Moore Award Nomination for Confluence (co-directed)
- Honorary Doctorate from Goldsmiths College

2015

- Winner of Royal Television Society's Composer Award for BBC's Wonders of the Monsoon

2017

- Recipient of the Ivor Novello's Lifetime Achievement Award

2019

- Recipient of the Outstanding Achievement in Music award at The Asian Awards.

2021

- Fellow of Global Music Charity - In Place of War
- Honorary Doctorate of Arts Coventry University

2023

- Honorary Doctorate Huddersfield University

2024

- Patron PRS Foundation

2025

- Honorary Degree from The University of York

== Additional information ==
Much of Sawhney's attention remains focused on the areas of education and community building, accepting the role of Artist in Residence for at least five performing arts organisations across Great Britain and Asia. Sawhney joined Sir George Martin as a patron of the national music college Access to Music, and he is also patron of the Raindance East Film Festival and the British Independent Film Awards. He appears regularly as an arts and current affairs commentator on topical discussion and news programmes such as the BBC's Newsnight, Newsnight Review, and HARDtalk. He has also written for UK national broadsheet newspapers: The Guardian, The Daily Telegraph, The Independent, and The Observer.

In June 2019, Sawhney was the guest on BBC Radio 4's Desert Island Discs. His favourite choice was Massive Attack's remix of "Mustt Mustt" by Nusrat Fateh Ali Khan: his book choice was The Fabric of Reality by David Deutsch.

In March 2024, Sawhney disclosed that he underwent emergency surgery following a heart attack.

Sawhney was chosen to serve as a judge for the 2024 Booker Prize, alongside Edmund de Waal (chair), Sara Collins, and Justine Jordan.

== Discography ==
=== Albums ===
List of albums, with selected details and chart positions
Title	Details	Peak chart positions		
Title	Details	UK	AUS	FRA
Spirit Dance	Released: 1994; Label: World Circuit	—	—	—
Migration	Released: 1995; Label: Outcaste	—	—	—
Displacing the Priest	Released: 1996; Label: Outcaste	—	—	—
Beyond Skin	Released: 1999; Label: Outcaste, Zomba	44	—	—
Prophesy	Released: 2001; Label: V2, BMG, Zomba	40	75	46
Human	Released: 2003; Label: V2, Imagem	54	—	62
Philtre	Released: 2005; Label: V2, Imagem	69	—	115
London Undersound	Released: 2008; Label: Cooking Vinyl, Imagem	68	—	137
Last Days of Meaning	Released: 2011; Label: Universal	—	—	—
OneZero	Released: 2013; Label: Cherry Red, Universal	—	—	—
Dystopian Dream	Released: 2015; Label: Positiv-ID	—	—	—
Immigrants	Released: 2021; Label: Piccadilly	—	—	—
Identity	Released: 2023; Label: Positiv	—	—	—

=== Compilations ===
- Introducing Nitin Sawhney (1999) Outcaste
- FabricLive.15 (2004) Fabric
- All Mixed Up (2004) V2
- In the Mind of... (2007) District 6

== Scores ==
1995

- Flight (Alex Pillai / Hindi Pictures for BBC TV)

1998

- Dance of Shiva (Jamie Payne / Epiphany Productions)

1999

- Split Wide Open (Dev Benegal / Anuradha Parikh / Tropic Films)
- The Fiancee (Alex Harvey)
- The Sikhs (John Das / BBC TV Documentary Series)

2001

- Ivor the Invisible (Hilary Audas / Paul Madden for Screen First / Channel 4 TV)

2002

- Anita & Me (Metin Husseyin / Paul Raphael)
- Bodily Harm (Joe Wright / Catherine Wearing / Channel 4 TV)
- Pure (Gilles MacKinnon / Howard Burch)

2003

- Twelfth Night (Tim Supple/ Rachel Gesua / Channel 4 TV)
- Second Generation (Jon Sen / Catherine Wearing / Channel 4 TV)
- Still the Children are Here (Dinaz Stafford / Mira Nair)

2004

- England Expects (Andy Smith / BBC 1)
- Tamworth Two (Metin Husseyin / ITV) 0
- Hari Om (Bharat Bala)
- Lila Says (Ziad Doueri)
- Angell's Hell (Saurabh Kakkar / ITV)
- Lions in Peril (Ingrid Kavalle / BBC)

2005

- Rose and Maloney (Metin Husseyin / Catherine Wearing / ITV)
- Blindsight (Lucy Walker / Sybil Robson-Orr)
- Natural Fantasia (Sean Christian / BBC Four documentary Natural World Symphony)
- Throw of Dice (Franz Osten 1929 silent film, new score performed by BBC Concert Orchestra)

2007

- Living Goddess From the producers of David La Chappelle's RIZE, Dark Fibre Films/More Four
- The Namesake (Mira Nair / Lydia Pilcher)
- Heavenly Sword (Ninja Theory / PlayStation 3)

2008

- The Fifth Beatle (Vivek Tiwary)

2009

- Jean Charles (Henrique Goldman)

2010

- Enslaved: Odyssey to the West (Ninja Theory / Xbox 360, PlayStation 3)
- Entanglement (Part of ROH2's Opera Shots at the Royal Opera House)

2011

- Human Planet (8-part BBC documentary series)

2012

- Midnight's Children (film from Salman Rushdie's novel)
- Alfred Hitchcock's The Lodger (remaster by Network / BFI)
- Japan in a Day (Scott Free Productions)
- Flying Paper

2013

- Vara: A Blessing

2014

- Dough Three coloured dog films ltd.
- Wonders of the Monsoon (BBC Natural History unit)
- The Real Nelson Mandela (History Channel)

2017

- Breathe (Andy Serkis / BBC Film)

2018

- Mowgli: Legend Of The Jungle (Andy Serkis / Warner Bros)

2019

- Traitors (6-part Channel 4 Series)
- A Girl From Mogadishu (Mary McGuckian / Pembridge Pictures)

2021

- The Colour Room (Claire McCarthy / Caspian Films)
- Settlers (Wyatt Rockefeller / Brittle-Star Pictures)

2022

- My Name Is Andrea (Pratibha Parmar)
- The Flatshare (Peter Cattaneo + Chloe Wicks / 42)
- What's Love Got To Do With It (Shekhar Kapur / Working Title)
- Hostile (Sonita Gale)

2024

- Tiger (Disneynature)
- Funny Woman (Sky Showtime)

2025

- Christmas Karma (Gurinder Chadha)
- Harry Potter: The Full-Cast Editions (Audible)

2026

- Vanished (Fragile Films)
- Orangutan (Disneynature)
