= Tiger (2024 film) =

2024 American nature documentary film about tigers

- Official release poster
- Directed by: Mark Linfield; Vanessa Berlowitz; Rob Sullivan
- Produced by: Mark Linfield; Vanessa Berlowitz; Roy Conli
- Narrated by: Priyanka Chopra
- Cinematography: Martyn Colbeck; Mark MacEwen; Simon Niblett; Kalyan Varma; Tom Walker
- Edited by: Nigel Buck
- Music by: Nitin Sawhney
- Production companies: Disneynature; Wildstar Films
- Distributed by: Disney+
- Release date: April 22, 2024
- Running time: 90 minutes
- Country: United States
- Language: English

Tiger is a 2024 American nature documentary film about Bengal tigers directed by Mark Linfield, Vanessa Berlowitz, and Rob Sullivan and narrated by Priyanka Chopra. It is the seventeenth nature documentary to be released under the Disneynature label. The film was released as a Disney+ exclusive on Earth Day April 22, 2024 and received positive reviews from critics.

== Plot ==
In the vast forests of India, a female Bengal tiger named Ambar has recently birthed an unusually large litter of four cubs. She will need to feed and protect her cubs for months before they can eat solid foods or hunt on their own. She will also need to hunt for meat to keep up her milk supply, leaving her cubs alone at times. The cubs are in regular danger from other predators, including the king of the jungle, male tiger Shankar. Through it all, Ambar navigates her environment and Shankar, as the cubs grow to full size.

== Production ==
Priyanka Chopra served as the narrator of Disneynature's documentary about Bengal tigers. Mark Linfield and Vanessa Berlowitz, the directing duo of Disneynature's film Elephant (2020), directed and produced the film for producer Roy Conli. Nitin Sawhney composed the film's score.

== Release ==
Tiger was released as a Disney+ exclusive on Earth Day April 22, 2024.

== Reception ==
On the review aggregator website Rotten Tomatoes, 88% of 8 critics' reviews are positive, with an average rating of 5.8/10.

Jennifer Green of Common Sense Media rated the film 4 out of 5 stars, praised the film for its wonderment and natural beauty, stating "it humanized their subjects and setting their daily actions to evocative music for easier understanding. For example, when mama tiger Ambar finds two cubs missing, Chopra Jonas tells us how she must be feeling as a melancholy tune plays in the background". John Serba of Decider gave a positive review, summarizing that "if you're not into watching tiger cubs wrestling and chasing monkeys up trees, you're probably a serial killer".
