= Natty (British singer) =

British singer-songwriter (born 1983)

- Born: Alexander Akiloe Philip Modiano; 1983 (age 41–42); San Francisco, California, United States
- Genres: Reggae, pop, ska, soul
- Occupations: Singer-songwriter, musician
- Instruments: Vocals, guitar
- Labels: Atlantic Records

Natty (born 1983) is a British singer-songwriter, born in California.

== History ==
Born Alexander Akiloe Philip Modiano in 1983 in San Francisco, California. Natty moved to London, England with his family at the age of one, where he grew up and went to school. His musical eclecticism of today reflects his "melting pot" upbringing, being mixed race and growing up in a multi-cultural cosmopolitan environment. Having started writing songs at an early age, he eventually found himself working in a London recording studio as a tea boy before working his way up to become a sound engineer, working with acts from a variety of genres.

He decided to put a 4-piece band together and began playing at open mic nights before launching his own eclectic club night Vibes and Pressure. His gigs attracted the attention of Atlantic Records.

Natty's first full single release, "July", entered the UK Singles Charts on July 27, 2008, at number 68. On August 4, 2008, Natty released his debut album, Man like I, featuring songs including "Cold Town", "Badman" and "July". "July" had an official remix produced by Crazy Cousinz and co-produced by Nat Powers. "Badman" was a top ten billboard single in Japan. Man like I entered the UK Album Charts on August 10, 2008, at number 21. Instrumental versions of his songs Badman and Coloured Souls appeared in the Electronic Arts videogame Tiger Woods PGA Tour 09.

Performance highlights include scoring his first American tour In September 2011, opening up for reggae artist Ziggy Marley, and playing an unauthorised headline show in front of thousands in Khartoum, Sudan which led to performing in the U.N building (New York City) on World Humanitarian Day alongside Beyonce. Natty's festival highlights include: Glastonbury, Boomtown, Bestival, Boardmasters, Garance Reggae Festival (France), Rototom (Spain), Sierra Nevada (California), NH7 (India), Summersonic (Japan) plus many more.

Dubbed a 'soul-reggae crossover sensation' by The Telegraph his TV/Media highlights include Performing on Later with Jools Holland, The BBC Electric Proms, C4 Music & Culture, BBC News, Sky News and a piece on his latest tour on ITV.

He is currently managed by Conscious Music Group and his Live agent is Andy Duggan of William Morris Agency.

== Discography ==
=== Albums ===
- Man like I (4 August 2008) UK No. 21
- Release the Fear (29 February 2016)
- Man like I&I (19 October 2018)

=== EPs ===
- Things I've Done (2010)
- Change (2011)
- Out of Fire (2012)

=== Singles ===
- "Badman" (7" vinyl only – 500 copies) JPN No. 2
- "Cold Town" (7" vinyl only) UK No. 130
- "July" UK No. 53
- "Bedroom Eyes" (released 29 September 2008)
- "Coloured Souls"
- "If I"

=== Non album and unreleased tracks ===
- Officer (July single B-side)
- The King Had a Dream – January 2009
- Days of Fire – London Undersound – Nitin Sawhney
