= Elephant (2020 film) =

2020 American nature documentary film about elephants

- Official release poster
- Directed by: Mark Linfield; Vanessa Berlowitz
- Produced by: Mark Linfield; Vanessa Berlowitz; Roy Conli
- Narrated by: Meghan, Duchess of Sussex
- Cinematography: Martyn Colbeck; Mike Holding; Tom Walker
- Edited by: Nigel Buck
- Music by: Ramin Djawadi
- Production companies: Disneynature; Silverback Films; Wildstar Films
- Distributed by: Disney+
- Release date: April 3, 2020
- Running time: 86 minutes
- Country: United States
- Language: English

Elephant is a 2020 American nature documentary film about elephants directed by Mark Linfield and Vanessa Berlowitz and narrated by Meghan, Duchess of Sussex. It is the fifteenth nature documentary to be released under the Disneynature label. The film was released alongside Dolphin Reef as a Disney+ exclusive on April 3, 2020. It received positive reviews from critics.

== Plot ==
In the Kalahari Desert in Southern Africa, many African bush elephants prepare to migrate from their home in the Okavango Delta to a grassy paradise near Victoria Falls until the rains return. The Herd is led by their great matriarch Gaia and her younger sister Shani, who has helped keep their family safe. Shani has also been raising her spirited son Jomo, a very energetic young elephant who just wants to play with the other animals, such as lechwes and baboons.

When the land is about to dry up, Gaia leads the elephants to an almost dry waterhole to enjoy the mud before leaving the desert. They are soon joined by other elephants who visit, play, and drink from the water. When the water dries up, Gaia notices a baby elephant suffocating and stuck in the mud, so she goes to its rescue, and the baby is reunited with its mother. The herd leaves the desert to join the other elephants on the long journey, they take a lunch break to have a family reunion with other herds of elephants, with some not seeing Gaia for over a year. Jomo starts making new friends with the other baby elephants, and for ages, Shani reunites with many of her long-lost cousins. Gaia's herd and other herds of elephants have no luck trying to find food, but a male elephant (who is visiting his family) uses his trunk to drop a bunch of seedpods from trees, allowing everyone to feast. Gaia's herd come across ancient paths that their ancestors created when they migrated. When they reach a dry waterhole, they notice an elephant skeleton. Shani shows a confused Jomo a life lesson. The herd moves on and find another waterhole (this time with water). As the elephants drink, Jomo plays with a group of warthogs. The water has been ruined by its previous visitors, so the elephants munch on Mopani trees, but are chased off by caterpillars who are eating all the leaves. The Herd continues their journey to a small little island. There is no water for them to drink, but Gaia leads her herd to some baobab trees which they could drink water from its sap. Shani teaches the young elephants how to get sap by ripping the thick bark. The Herd rests on the island for the night.

Continuing their journey, the Herd trudges through sandstorms. Shani and Gaia sense the ground trembling, which means a river close by, but they are despaired when they reach the river. It is far below the cliffs where the elephants are, but thanks to the help of a flock of Quelea birds, the herd makes their way to Victoria Falls. The Herd happily drinks but are soon confronted by crocodiles, but the Herd escape without any member getting hurt. They reach the islands, and the Herd enjoy their times in Victoria Falls and even munch on palm nuts. Meanwhile, in the highlands of Angola, rain starts to pour, which means the water is going off to the Okavango Delta, Shani and Jomo's home. Soon after, Gaia starts to get tired and weak and finds the food hard to eat. She and The Herd start making their way back to Okavango. Shani helps Gaia gather the herd, with Jomo by their side. Gaia realizes that the Angolan falls are early, and she and Shani immediately gather the herd to use the shortest route, but they soon find themselves confronted by a pride of lions. As the elephants settle in for the night, the lions attack Jomo, but he is saved by Shani. But by morning, Gaia dies, with the herd sharing a mournful goodbye to their matriarch, while the lions share their feast. Shani finds her leadership to the other elephants difficult. A week later, an elephant gives birth to a newborn baby calf. Jomo is unimpressed, but soon lets go of being the baby of the family and warms up to his new playmate.

Shani soon uses Gaia's memories and begins to lead the herd back to the Delta. They are soon confronted by a rival herd of elephants, who are going after the newborn calf. Shani stands her ground at the rival matriarch, and the rivals retreat. They make their way home to the Okavango, where the land is bursting back to life. The Herd soon accepts Shani as the new matriarch, while Jomo teaches the newborn calf how to play with the other animals.

== Release ==
Elephant was released as a Disney+ exclusive on Earth Day April 3, 2020.

== Reception ==
=== Critical response ===
On the review aggregator website Rotten Tomatoes, 81% of 27 critics' reviews are positive, with an average rating of 6.7/10. The website's consensus reads: "Disneynature: Elephant adds to the studio's tradition of kid-focused, beautifully photographed nature documentaries that are just engaging enough for parents." Metacritic, which uses a weighted average, assigned the film a score of 61 out of 100, based on 11 critics, indicating "generally favorable" reviews.

Richard Lawson of VanityFair praised the film for its advocation for the protection and preservation of the environment and wildlife, and complimented the Duchess of Sussex's performance, stating: "It's a solid nature movie, not quite factual enough to be a true work of scientific observation, but engaging and persuasively conservationist in its subtle way. But the real showcase here is Ms. Markle, of course". Jennifer Green of Common Sense Media rated the film 4 out of 5 stars and wrote: "Elephant is appropriate for all ages, but some viewers may find it a little slow-going. The filmmakers confront that by introducing new dangers for the elephants, creating moments of suspense throughout the film. These scenes include possible drowning, predators like lions and hyenas, a baby elephant with his head stuck in the mud, and more. Some could be scary/upsetting for certain viewers, especially when the youngest elephants are put at risk. But the elephants always come through the scares intact until near the end of the film, when one matriarch dies of old age. It's a tender scene as the herd gathers around her and feels for her last breath with their trunks, covering her eyes with her ear when she's finally gone. Some viewers, though, may feel uneasy knowing that her body will likely be attacked by surrounding lions as soon as the herd moves on. Likewise, narrator Meghan, Duchess of Sussex makes clear that while this herd has survived its perilous journey, not all do". Kate Erbland of IndieWire graded the film B+ and acclaimed the Duchess’s voiceover work, explaining it manages to balance between providing amusement and education to the audience, while praising the film for its photography and educational value. Peter Bradshaw of The Guardian rated the film 3 out of 5 stars and praised the direction of the film, claiming it manages to provide immersive scenes and explore the intimacy of wildlife, while giving a positive take on the duchess's performance.

=== Accolades ===
Year	Award	Category	Nominee(s)	Result	Ref.
2021	CinEuphoria Awards	Best Documentary – International Competition	Elephant	Won	
2021	International Film Music Critics Association	Best Original Score for a Documentary	Ramin Djawadi	Nominated	

== See also ==
- The Elephant Queen
