= Filmtracks =

Modern film score review website

- Screenshot Filmtracks on January 23, 2017
- Website type: Music, film score, forum
- Owner: Christian Clemmensen
- Creator: Christian Clemmensen
- Revenue: Nonprofit
- Website: www.filmtracks.com
- Launched: 24 September 1996
- Current status: Active

Filmtracks is a modern film score review website created and maintained by its sole reviewer, Christian Clemmensen. Since the launch of Filmtracks in 1996, the website has reviewed nearly two-thousand soundtracks dating as far back as 1954, though the website's focus is primarily those composed after 1975. Filmtracks also has a forum.

== Accolades ==
In February 1998, Filmtracks was highly recommended to film music fans by Lukas Kendall at Film Score Monthly. In October 2000, Entertainment Weekly's Erin Podolsky gave the website an 'A' rating and called it "A MUST-VISIT". In April 2001, Filmtracks was also named Associate of the Month by Amazon.

== Filmtracks Awards ==
=== Best Film Score ===
Year	Winner Composer	Nominees
1986	Hoosiers – Jerry Goldsmith	Winners only. Information on pre-1989 nominees is no longer accessible.
1987	The Witches of Eastwick – John Williams	Winners only. Information on pre-1989 nominees is no longer accessible.
1988	Willow – James Horner	Winners only. Information on pre-1989 nominees is no longer accessible.
1989	Glory – James Horner	Batman – Danny Elfman; Farewell to the King – Basil Poledouris; Henry V – Patrick Doyle; The Little Mermaid – Alan Menken; Old Gringo - Lee Holdridge
1990	The Russia House – Jerry Goldsmith	Dances with Wolves – John Barry; Edward Scissorhands – Danny Elfman; The Hunt for Red October – Basil Poledouris; Presumed Innocent – John Williams
1991	Beauty and the Beast – Alan Menken	Hook – John Williams; Fried Green Tomatoes – Thomas Newman; The Rocketeer – James Horner; Star Trek VI: The Undiscovered Country – Cliff Eidelman
1992	Far and Away – John Williams	1492: Conquest of Paradise – Vangelis; Aladdin – Alan Menken; The Last of the Mohicans – Trevor Jones, Randy Edelman; Medicine Man – Jerry Goldsmith
1993	Schindler's List – John Williams	Heaven & Earth – Kitarō; Jurassic Park – John Williams; Rudy – Jerry Goldsmith; Sommersby – Danny Elfman
1994	Only You – Rachel Portman	Forrest Gump – Alan Silvestri; Legends of the Fall – James Horner; The Lion King – Hans Zimmer; Stargate – David Arnold
1995	Apollo 13 – James Horner	The American President – Marc Shaiman; Crimson Tide – Hans Zimmer; Cutthroat Island – John Debney; Dr. Jekyll and Ms. Hyde – Mark McKenzie; Il Postino – Luis Bacalov
1996	The Spitfire Grill – James Horner	Evita – Andrew Lloyd Webber; The Ghost and the Darkness – Jerry Goldsmith; Michael Collins – Elliot Goldenthal; Independence Day – David Arnold
1997	Titanic – James Horner	Anastasia – David Newman; Hoodlum – Elmer Bernstein; The Saint – Graeme Revell; Seven Years in Tibet – John Williams; Tomorrow Never Dies – David Arnold
1998	The Mask of Zorro – James Horner	Dangerous Beauty – George Fenton; Great Expectations – Patrick Doyle; Incognito – John Ottman; Les Misérables – Basil Poledouris; The Prince of Egypt – Hans Zimmer
1999	The Cider House Rules – Rachel Portman	Angela's Ashes – John Williams; Anna and the King – George Fenton; Message in a Bottle – Gabriel Yared; Star Wars: Episode I – The Phantom Menace – John Williams
2000	The Legend of Bagger Vance – Rachel Portman	All the Pretty Horses – Marty Stuart, Kristin Wilkinson, Larry Paxton; East/West – Patrick Doyle; The Family Man – John Ottman; Gladiator – Hans Zimmer, Lisa Gerrard; Thirteen Days – Trevor Jones
2001	The Lord of the Rings: The Fellowship of the Ring – Howard Shore	The Affair of the Necklace – David Newman; A.I. Artificial Intelligence – John Williams; A Beautiful Mind – James Horner; From Hell – Trevor Jones; Moulin Rouge! – Craig Armstrong
2002	The Lord of the Rings: The Two Towers – Howard Shore	Far from Heaven – Elmer Bernstein; Frida – Elliot Goldenthal; The Hours – Philip Glass; Star Wars: Episode II – Attack of the Clones – John Williams
2003	The Gospel of John – Jeff Danna	Gods and Generals – Elmer Bernstein; The Lord of the Rings: The Return of the King – Howard Shore; The Missing – James Horner; Sinbad: Legend of the Seven Seas – Harry Gregson-Williams
2004	The Terminal – John Williams	Alexander – Vangelis; The Chorus – Bruno Coulais; Deep Blue – George Fenton; Ray – Craig Armstrong; Troy (rejected) – Gabriel Yared
2005	The Legend of Zorro – James Horner	Arsène Lupin – Debbie Wiseman; The Brothers Grimm – Dario Marianelli; Racing Stripes – Mark Isham; Star Wars: Episode III – Revenge of the Sith – John Williams
2006	Lady in the Water – James Newton Howard	Curse of the Golden Flower – Shigeru Umebayashi; The Nativity Story – Mychael Danna; The Promise – Klaus Badelt; Superman Returns – John Ottman
2007	Angel – Philippe Rombi	Nomad: The Warrior – Carlo Siliotto; Island of Lost Souls – Jane Antonia Cornish; Partition – Brian Tyler; 3:10 to Yuma – Marco Beltrami
2008	No winner	The Boy in the Striped Pyjamas – James Horner; Defiance – James Newton Howard; Journey to the Center of the Earth – Andrew Lockington; Meet the Spartans – Christopher Lennertz; Ponyo - Joe Hisaishi
2009	Lesbian Vampire Killers – Debbie Wiseman	Agora – Dario Marianelli; Avatar – James Horner; Couples Retreat – A. R. Rahman; Drag Me to Hell – Christopher Young; Pope Joan – Marcel Barsotti
2010	Space Battleship Yamato – Naoki Satō	Alice in Wonderland – Danny Elfman; The Chronicles of Narnia: The Voyage of the Dawn Treader – David Arnold; How to Train Your Dragon – John Powell; The Last Airbender – James Newton Howard
2011	La Ligne droite – Patrick Doyle	The Adventures of Tintin: The Secret of the Unicorn – John Williams; The Greatest Miracle – Mark McKenzie; Priest – Christopher Young; Real Steel – Danny Elfman; Soul Surfer – Marco Beltrami
2012	Journey 2: The Mysterious Island – Andrew Lockington	The Amazing Spider-Man – James Horner; The Hobbit: An Unexpected Journey – Howard Shore; John Carter – Michael Giacchino; Life of Pi – Mychael Danna
2013	Romeo and Juliet – Abel Korzeniowski	Jack the Giant Slayer – John Ottman; Now You See Me – Brian Tyler; The Physician (Der Medicus) – Ingo Ludwig Frenzel; The Hobbit: The Desolation of Smaug – Howard Shore
2014	How To Train Your Dragon 2 – John Powell (tie) Tarzan – David Newman (tie)	The Hobbit: The Battle of the Five Armies – Howard Shore; Maleficent – James Newton Howard; The Monkey King – Christopher Young
2015	Star Wars: The Force Awakens – John Williams	Jupiter Ascending – Michael Giacchino; Mission: Impossible – Rogue Nation – Joe Kraemer; Muhammad: The Messenger of God – A.R. Rahman; Tomorrowland – Michael Giacchino
2016	Tale of a Lake – Panu Aaltio	Alice Through the Looking Glass – Danny Elfman; Assassination Classroom: Graduation – Naoki Satō; Fantastic Beasts and Where to Find Them – James Newton Howard; The Jungle Book – John Debney
2017	Star Wars: The Last Jedi – John Williams	Beauty and the Beast – Alan Menken; Bitter Harvest – Benjamin Wallfisch; Murder on the Orient Express – Patrick Doyle; Viceroy's House – A.R. Rahman
2018	Solo: A Star Wars Story – John Powell & John Williams	The Cloverfield Paradox – Bear McCreary; Fantastic Beasts: The Crimes of Grindelwald – James Newton Howard; Mary Poppins Returns – Marc Shaiman; Max & Me – Mark McKenzie
2019	Star Wars: The Rise of Skywalker – John Williams	Godzilla: King of the Monsters – Bear McCreary; How to Train Your Dragon: The Hidden World – John Powell; Traumfabrik – Philipp Noll; Maleficent: Mistress of Evil – Geoff Zanelli
2020	The Call of the Wild – John Powell	Elephant – Ramin Djawadi; The One and Only Ivan – Craig Armstrong; El Verano Que Vivimos – Federico Jusid; Wonder Woman 1984 – Hans Zimmer
2021	Ghostbusters: Afterlife – Rob Simonsen	Encanto – Germaine Franco; Finders of the Lost Yacht – Panu Aaltio; Mortal Kombat – Benjamin Wallfisch; Jungle Cruise – James Newton Howard
2022	Avatar: The Way of Water – Simon Franglen	Luck – John Debney; Mia and Me: The Hero of Centopia – Christoph Zirngibl; Serengeti: A Journey to the Heart of Africa – Alan Williams; Violent Night – Dominic Lewis
2023	No winner	Indiana Jones and the Dial of Destiny – John Williams; In Love and Deep Water – Takatsugu Muramatsu; The Little Mermaid (2023 film) – Alan Menken; Migration – John Powell; Supercell - Corey Wallace
2024	Young Woman and the Sea – Amelia Warner	Here – Alan Silvestri; Spellbound – Alan Menken; That Christmas – John Powell; Wicked – John Powell/Stephen Schwartz; The Wild Robot - Kris Bowers
2025	How to Train Your Dragon (2025 film) – John Powell	Avatar: Fire and Ash – Simon Franglen; Final Destination Bloodlines – Tim Wynn; Now You See Me: Now You Don't – Brian Tyler; Wicked For Good – John Powell/Stephen Schwartz
