= International Film Music Critics Association Award for Best Original Score for a Documentary =

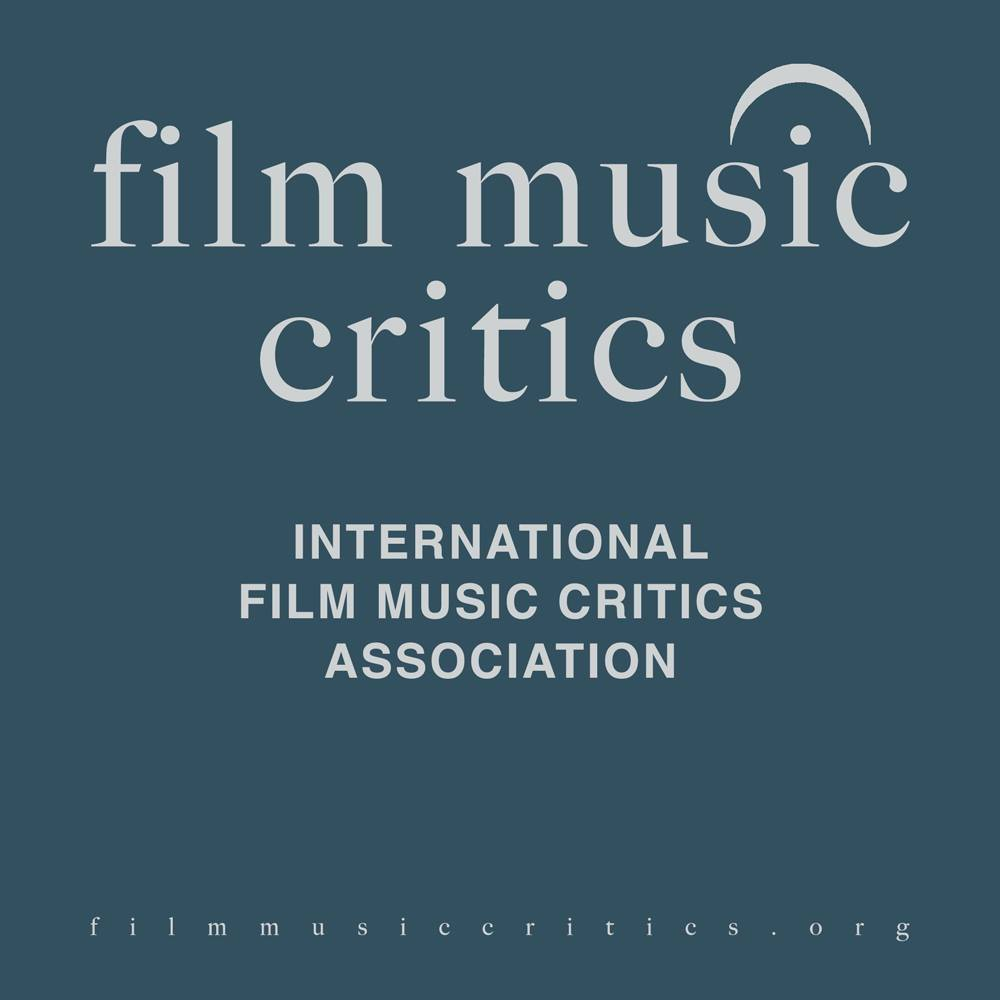
- International Film Music Critics Association logo
- Formerly called: Best Original Score for a Documentary Film
- First award: 2008

The International Film Music Critics Association Award for Best Original Score for a Documentary is an annual award given by the International Film Music Critics Association (IFMCA). Established in 2008, the award is given to the composer of a film or television score for a documentary based on two criteria: the effectiveness, appropriateness and emotional impact of the score in the context of the film for which it was written; and the technical and intellectual merit of the composition when heard as a standalone listening experience." The eligibility period runs January 1 through December 31 every year, and IFMCA members vote for the winner the following February. When the award was established in 2008, it was called "Best Original Score for a Documentary Feature" and only documentary films were eligible. Eligibility was expanded in before the 2011 awards to include documentary TV shows. In 2020, the award was renamed to reflect the new criteria.

== Winners and nominees ==
=== 2000s ===
Best Original Score for a Documentary Feature

Year	Film	Composer(s)
2007	Earth	George Fenton
2007	Darfur Now	Graeme Revell
2007	In the Shadow of the Moon	Philip Sheppard
2007	The First Cry	Armand Amar
2007	The White Planet	Bruno Coulais
2008	Standard Operating Procedure	Danny Elfman
2008	The Crimson Wing: Mystery of the Flamingos	The Cinematic Orchestra
2008	Dear Zachary: A Letter to a Son About His Father	Kurt Kuenne
2008	Night	Cezary Skubiszewski
2008	Tabarly	Yann Tiersen
2009	Home	Armand Amar
2009	Brothers at War	Lee Holdridge
2009	Earth Days	Michael Giacchino
2009	Garbo: The Spy	Fernando Velázquez
2009	Under the Sea 3D	Micky Erbe and Maribeth Solomon

=== 2010s ===
Year	Documentary	Composer(s)
2010	Oceans	Bruno Coulais
2010	Babies	Bruno Coulais
2010	The Battle of Britain	Miguel d'Oliveira
2010	Waiting for "Superman"	Christophe Beck
2010	The Wildest Dream	Joel Douek
2011	The Wind Gods	Pinar Toprak
2011	Frozen Planet	George Fenton
2011	Hold at All Costs: The Story of the Battle of Outpost Harry	Larry Groupé
2011	Jig	Patrick Doyle
2011	Russland - Im Reich der Tiger, Bären und Vulkane	Kolja Erdmann
2012	Tale of a Forest	Panu Aaltio
2012	Kingdom of Plants 3D	Joel Douek, Freddy Sheinfeld and Elik Alvarez
2012	Los mundos sutiles	Pascal Gaigne
2012	Samsara	Lisa Gerrard and Michael Stearns
2012	Simon Schama's Shakespeare	Miguel d'Oliveira
2013	Tim's Vermeer	Conrad Pope
2013	Africa	Sarah Class
2013	An Article of Hope	Blake Neely
2013	Anne & Alet	Mark Rayen Candasamy
2013	Secrets of the North Sea	Oliver Heuss
2014	The Unknown Known	Danny Elfman
2014	Ballet Boys	Henrik Skram
2014	Bears	George Fenton
2014	Cosmos: A Spacetime Odyssey	Alan Silvestri
2014	Hidden Kingdoms	Ben Foster
2015	The Hunt	Steven Price
2015	The Great Human Odyssey	Darren Fung
2015	He Named Me Malala	Thomas Newman
2015	Human	Armand Amar
2015	I Am Big Bird: The Caroll Spinney Story	Joshua Johnson
2016	Tale of a Lake	Panu Aaltio
2016	Paper Lanterns	Chad Cannon
2016	Planet Earth II	Hans Zimmer (theme); Jasha Klebe and Jacob Shea
2016	Seasons	Bruno Coulais
2016	Spain in a Day	Alberto Iglesias
2017	Mully	Benjamin Wallfisch, Matías León
2017	Boston: An American Running Story	Jeff Beal
2017	Blue Planet II	Hans Zimmer (theme); Jacob Shea and David Fleming
2017	Earth: One Amazing Day	Alex Heffes
2017	Jane	Philip Glass
2018	The Tides of Fate	Pinar Toprak
2018	Dynasties	Benji Merrison and Will Slater
2018	Free Solo	Marco Beltrami
2018	McQueen	Michael Nyman
2018	Wild	Matthijs Kieboom

Best Original Score for a Documentary

Year	Documentary	Composer(s)
2019	Our Planet	Steven Price
2019	The Biggest Little Farm	Jeff Beal
2019	CyberWork and the American Dream	Chad Cannon
2019	Finis Terrae	Christoph Zirngibl
2019	Untamed Romania	Nainita Desai

=== 2020s ===
Year	Documentary	Composer(s)
2020	David Attenborough: A Life on Our Planet	Steven Price
2020	Elephant	Ramin Djawadi
2020	Harbor From the Holocaust	Chad Cannon
2020	Rising Phoenix	Daniel Pemberton
2020	Sadan Hanim	George Kallis
2021	Tale of the Sleeping Giants	Panu Aaltio
2021	The Arctic: Our Last Great Wilderness	Alex Heffes
2021	Julia	Rachel Portman
2021	A Perfect Planet	Ilan Eshkeri
2021	Qinghai: Our National Park	Chad Cannon
