= Tale of a Forest =

2012 film by Kim Saarniluoto and Ville Suhonen

- Film poster
- Directed by: Kim Saarniluoto; Ville Suhonen
- Written by: Ville Suhonen
- Produced by: Marko Röhr
- Narrated by: Turkka Mastomäki; Christian Ruotanen
- Cinematography: Teemu Liakka; Mikko Pöllänen; Hannu Siitonen
- Edited by: Kim Saarniluoto
- Music by: Panu Aaltio
- Production company: MRP Matila Röhr Productions
- Distributed by: Nordisk Film
- Release date: 28 December 2012
- Running time: 75 minutes
- Country: Finland
- Language: Finnish
- Budget: € 185,000

Tale of a Forest (Finnish: Metsän tarina) is a 2012 Finnish nature documentary film directed by Kim Saarniluoto and Ville Suhonen. It combines footage from forests with narration about Finnish folklore. When it was released it broke the attendance record for a Finnish documentary film in Finnish cinemas.

== Synopsis ==
Tale of a Forest portrays animals and plants found in Finnish forests and surveys how they figure in folk customs and mythology. There are two narrators, a young boy and a grown man. The narrators say that the ancient Finnish people believed in a world tree that holds up the sky and existed before all other trees. Forests were regarded as the domains of beings from folklore, and human visitors were expected to pay due respect to the owners. The narrators talk about how natural phenomena and features in the terrain have been associated with folkloric concepts, such as different types of beings and specific gods, and how Finnish people in the past have related to these. There is footage of forests from the four seasons, beginning in winter and ending in autumn.

== Production ==
Tale of a Forest was produced by Marko Röhr for MRP Matila Röhr Productions with support from the Finnish Film Foundation and Yle. It had a budget of 185,000 euro. Filming took place from 2008 to 2012 in Parikkala, Punkaharju, Ruokolahti and Rautjärvi.

== Reception ==
Nordisk Film released Tale of a Forest in Finnish cinemas on 28 December 2012. The same company released Finnish DVD and Blu-ray editions in 2013.

Tale of a Forest made revenues corresponding to 813,324 US dollars from cinema screenings in Finland, which was the best performance ever for a Finnish documentary film. It lost the record later in 2013 to the ice hockey film Selänne.

Panu Aaltio received the IFMCA Award for Best Original Score for a Documentary for his music for Tale of a Forest.

== Trilogy ==
Tale of a Forest is the first entry in a trilogy of standalone films that combine nature footage and Finnish mythology. Also produced by MRP Matila Röhr Productions, the other entries are Tale of a Lake (2016), which portrays Finland's lakes and their wildlife, and Tale of the Sleeping Giants (2021), which was filmed in the mountains of Sápmi.
