= Kenneth Elvebakk =

Norwegian documentary film director

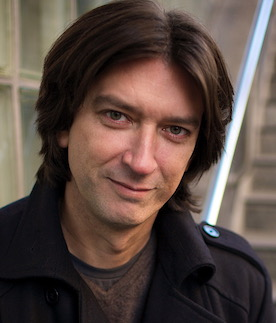
This is Kenneth Slotterøy Elvebakk

Kenneth Elvebakk (born October 11, 1966) is a Norwegian documentary film director. He has won several international awards for his documentary films.

== Biography ==
Elvebakk was born in Hemnesberget. He was educated at the University of Oslo, Norwegian School of Management and Oslo Film and Television Academy. He has worked several years for The Norwegian Broadcasting Corporation (NRK) - both radio and TV. Ballet Boys had theatrical releases in several countries including The UK (London 9 September 2014), France, Norway, Japan, Taiwan and Hong Kong. Ballet Boys has achieved great success and sold to many countries. His latest film Hello World premiered at the film festival Oslo Pix on 31 May 2021 and won the audience award for best film and had its international festival premiere at Cinekid in the section "Best Children's Film".

== Filmography ==
- 2021 – Hello World
- 2014 – Ballet Boys
- 2013 – Queer Muslims (radio)
- 2013 – 5 films for NIF
- 2011 – Samfunnsbølla
- 2010 – daKings (Jenter med baller)
- 2010 – TV-series Cabin Dreams
- 2007 – 3269 Daisy
- 2007 – Ronja and Stella
- 2007 – Maybe we'll have a baby for Christmas? (radio)
- 2006 – Hullabaloo (Raballder)
- 2006 – TV-series Hullabaloo
- 2003 – The Secret Club
- 2000 – A positive life
- 1999 – Big man begs for help
- 1998 – Sunshine Kids in Namibia
- 1997 – Out of order
- 1996 – Dangerous moments
- 1994 – Base Jump

== Awards and nominations ==
- 2023 – Winner of Best Foreign Documentary Feature, Atlanta DocuFest (Hallo World)
- 2022 – Winner of the Grand Jury Feature International Documentary Award, Orlando International Film Festival (Hello World)
- 2022 – Winner of the Nigel Moore Award for Youth Programming, DOXA Documentary Film Festival, Canada (Hello World)
- 2022 – Winner of Special Jury Award, Best Documentary Feature Film, Providence Children's Film Festival (Hello World)
- 2022 – Winner of the Special Prize for the Best Doc for Youth, Pärnu International Documentary and Science Film Festival (Hello World)
- 2022 – Nominated to the Best Feature Nordic Documentary, Västerås Film Festival (Hello World)
- 2022 – Nominated to the Best Documentary Feature, KASHISH Mumbai International Queer Film Festival (Hello World)
- 2022 – Nominated to the Human Award, Human International Documentary Film Festival (Hello World)
- 2021 – Winner of the Audience Award, Tromsø International Film Festival Junior (Hello World)
- 2021 – Honorable Mention, Best Feature Length Film, Tromsø International Film Festival Junior (Hello World)
- 2021 – Winner of the Grand Pix Audience Award, Oslo Pix (Hello World)
- 2021 – Nominated for the Best Nordic Documentary, Oslo Pix (Hello World)
- 2021 – Honorable Mention, Youth Jury Award, Nordiche Filmtage Lübeck (Hello World)
- 2021 – Nominated to the Children's Choice Award, Nordisk Panorama (Hello World)
- 2016 – Special Mention, Cinekid, Eurimages Co-Production Development Award (Hello World)
- 2015 – Winner of the Audience Award at Tromsø International Children's Film Festival (Ballet Boys)
- 2015 – Winner of Best Reportage at The International Festival of Films on Art in Montréal (Ballet Boys)
- 2014 – Winner of Best Youth film (For Tomorrow award) at Oulu International Children's and Youth Film Festival (Ballet Boys)
- 2014 – Winner of Children's Jury 2nd Prize Documentary Feature Film at Chicago International Children's Film Festival (Ballet Boys)
- 2014 – Nominated for the SOS-Kinderdörfer Award, Munich International Documentary Festival (Ballet Boys)
- 2011 – Nominated for the Norwegian Ministry of Culture's Human Rights Award for Best Short Film (daKings)
- 2008 – Winner of The silver statue at Roshd International Film Festival (3269 Daisy)
- 2008 – Nominated for the Nordic Independent Film Awards for best Nordic documentary at AFIA Film Festival (3269 Daisy)
- 2006 – Winner of The Norwegian TV Award "Gullruten" for best docusoap (Raballder / Hullabaloo)
- 2004 – Winner of the Audience Award at Mix Brasil (The Secret Club)
- 2004 – Nominated for the Norwegian government's Human Rights Award for Best Short Film (The Secret Club)
