= Taavi Vartia =

Finnish film director and screenwriter

Taavi Vartia (born 9 November 1965, in Helsinki, Finland) is a Finnish film director, script writer and writer. Taavi Vartia has since 1990 planned, directed and produced programmes for all of Finland's national television channels: YLE TV1, YLE TV2, MTV3 and Nelonen, across a range of genres including drama, entertainment, music, profiles and documentaries. He has been involved in the production of over 1100 episodes. Vartia has also written and directed several company- and image videos for Finnish companies. In recent years he has received recognition as a writer of young adult dramas and as a documentary film maker. Vartia has published four novels. Vartia founded Taaborin kesäteatteri/ Taabori Summer Theater in Nurmijärvi 2009 and started to run the movie theatre Kino Juha 2019.

== Feature films ==
- Pertsa ja Kilu/ Finders of the Lost Yacht. Script writer and Director. Premiered in July 2021.
- Rölli ja kaikkien aikojen salaisuus/ Rolli and the Secret of All Times. Script writer and Director. Premiered in September 2016.
- Lomasankarit/ The Island of Secrets. Script writer and Director. Premiered in October 2014.
- Rölli ja kultainen avain/ Rölli and the Golden Key]. Script writer and Director. Premiered in February 2013

== Programmes ==
=== Drama ===
- Kevyttä yläpilveä/ World's safest place (Elisa Viihde & Nelonen, Warner Bros./2020) 8 episodes. Original idea and director.
- Huone 301/ Man in Room 301 (Elisa Viihde & Warner Bros./2019) Co-Producer in Greece with Ikas Film & TV Productions.
- Keisari Aarnio/ King Liar (Nelonen/ 2018), 10 episodes, directed 3.
- Syke (TV1 & Nelonen/ 2015-2018). Director seasons 3, 5 and 6. The third season won 2016 Kultainen Venla in category the best TV-programme.
- Downshiftaajat/ Downshifters (Elisa Viihde & YLE TV2/ 2016-2017). Director, season 2.
- Käenpesä family drama (MTV3/ 2005–2006) 16 episodes. Director, one of many directors
- Suolaista vettä drama for young people (TV1/ 2000) 6 episodes. Script Writer (original theme by Kari Levola)
- Pertsan ja Kilun uudet seikkailut drama for young people (TV2/ 2000). Director and Script writer. Actors: Santeri Kinnunen, Vesa Vierikko, Eija Vilpas, Jaana Saarinen, Ismo Apell and Tapio Liinoja
- Samaa Sukua, eri maata family drama (TV1/ 1997–98) 46 episodes. Director
- Houdinin pojat mini serial (MTV3/ 1997) 4 episodes. Director, producer
- Isäni on Supermies drama for young people (FST/ not filmed) 6 episodes. Script Writer (Script support by Nordiska Kulturfonden 2001)
- Komisario Koivu detective comedy (TV1/ 1996) 28 episodes. Direction, one of many script writers
- Marskin poika television film (TV1/ 1995). Direction, dramatization
- Tapulikylä family drama (TV1/ 1995) 5 episodes. Director

=== Entertainment and talk shows ===
- Kuvia ja käännekohtia/ Pictures and Turning Points(AlfaTV/2017-) . Producer, host.
- Kamera käy/ Action (AlfaTV/2017-2018), 29 episodes. Producer and host with Jenni Banerjee.
- Ota tai Jätä (Deal Or No Deal) format (Nelonen/ 2007) 10 episodes. Director
- Big Brother format (SubTv/ 2006) 6 episodes. Live-action director of first six parts
- Pääroolissa "Lets make a film"- entertainment (TV1/ 2005) 8 episodes. Director, Host
- Diili (The Apprentice) format (MTV3/ 2004) 15 episodes. Director
- Videotreffit video date entertainment for young people (TV2/ 1999) 18 episodes. Director
- Ben Furman, talk show (TV1/1999) 18 episodes. Director
- Haastattelijana Mirja Pyykkö, talk show (TV1/1995-97) 40 episodes. Director, Producer
- Sinun Unelmiesi Tähden human fantasies (TV1/ 1995) 10 episodes. Director
- Etusivu uusiksi press competition (TV2/ 1995) 50 episodes. Host
- Tämä on minun quiz (TV1/ 1994) 18 episodes. Director
- Erotico-tico erotic sketch show (TV1/ 1992) 18 episodes. Director, Script Writer

=== Music entertainment and concerts ===
- Seinäjoen Tangomarkkinat/ Tango Festival in Seinäjoki -concerts(Alfa TV/2018): Queen's Final, King's Final, Meidän Tango/ Our Tango -Concert and Semi Finals in Kerava. Director.
- Seinäjoen Tangomarkkinat/ Tango Festival in Seinäjoki -concerts (Alfa TV/2017): Queen's Final, King's Final, Tango Finlandia -Concert and Semi Finals in Kerava. Director.
- Kirka –taiteilijajuhlakonsertti concert (TV1/ 1998). Director
- Toivomuslähde (TV2/ 1998) 19 parts. Director
- Puhdas Elämä Lapselle concerts 1996 and 1997 at the Olympic Stadium (MTV3). Director
- Euroviisut 1996 Eurovision Song Contest, Finnish Competition (TV1/ 1999). Director
- Danny –taiteilijajuhlakonsertti (TV1/ 1996). Director
- Sarajevo-konsertti at the Olympic Stadium (TV1/ 1995). Director, reporter
- Euroviisut 1994 Eurovision Song Contest, Finnish Competition (TV1/ 1994). Director
- Katri Helena 50-v –konsertti concert (TV1/ 1994). Director
- Pellit auki (TV1/1993) 6 parts. Director

=== Documentaries and current affairs ===
- Silicon Valley Baby (2020) documentary film. Executive producer, Production company Taavi Vartia Film & TV.
- Itämeri (Baltic Sea (MTV3/ 2012) 12 episodes. Director, Script writer
- After the Blood Diamonds documentary film (Sierra Leone) for international distribution (2008–2009). Director, writer
- Suomen Historia history of Finland (TV1/1998) 4 episodes. Director, producer
- Suomalainen kirjallisuuden historia history of Finnish Literature (TV1/1998) 4 episodes. Director
- Testamentti profiles (TV2/ 1998) 10 episodes. Producer
- Sata sanaa literature programme (TV1/20001) 50 episodes. Director, Planning
- Aleksis K literature programme (YleTeema/ 2000) 38 episodes. Director, producer
- Tosi Tarina profiles (TV1/ 2000) 5 episodes. Reporter, director
- Katsojan suora opinion programme (TV2/ 1998) 30 parts. Producer
- Eläköön viini! fact/entertainment (Nelonen/ 1998) 10 episodes. Director, Planning
- Kirurgia Nyt! serial of modern medicin (TV1/ 1997) 10 episodes. Director, producer
- Miisa matkalla tähtiin? profile/report (TV1/1996). Reporter, director
- Venäläinen Baletti – taide, uskonto ja filosofia documentary of the stars of Bolshoi Theatre (TV2/ 1990). Director, reporter
- Päiväntasaaja current affairs/ entertainment (TV/ 1995) 50 episodes. Producer, Host/ Reporter

=== Others ===
- Games of the XXVII Olympiad in Athens 2004 (several channels worldwide/ 2004). Slomotion Director in international field (running)
- Drive or Die direct theatre broadcasting from Kaapelitehdas (TV1/ 1997). TV Direction
- Orvot direct theatre play broadcasting from Kansallisteatteri/National Theatre (TV1/1997). TV Direction

== Theatre ==
Taavi Vartia has directed numerous plays for the whole family at the Taaborin kesätetatteri/ Taabor Summer Theater, which he founded in 2009. The summer theater is based in Taaborinvuori, Nurmijärvi, Finland.

- 2020 Vaahteramäen Eemeli/ That Boy Emil. Playwright Astrid Lindgren.
- 2019 Tuhkimo/ Cinderella. Playwright
- 2018 Peppi Pitkätossu/ Pippi Longstocking. Playwright Astrid Lindgren.
- 2017 Heinähattu, Vilttitossu ja Rubensin veljekset. Playwright Tiina Nopola and Sinikka Nopola.
- 2016 Risto Räppääjä ja Nelli Nuudelipää. Playwright Tiina Nopola and Sinikka Nopola
- 2015 Zorro. Playwright Esa Silander.
- 2014 Peter Pan. Playwright.
- 2013 Vaahteramäen Eemeli/ That Boy Emil. Playwright Astrid Lindgren.
- 2012 Gangsteri ja kaunotar. Playwright.
- 2011 Kaikkien aikojen Robin Hood/ The all-time Robin Hood. Playwright
- 2009 ja 2010 Kaikkien aikojen Pertsa ja Kilu. Playwright
- 2008 Kaikkien aikojen Pertsa ja Kilu. Kirjurinluodon kesäteatteri. Director and Playwright.

== Novels ==
- Varastettu Vaimo ("Stolen Wife"),ISBN 9789522990839, ISBN 9522990833, published August 2015 by Paasilinna Kustannus.
- Tuulen viemä mies ("Man Gone with the Wind"), pages 503, ISBN 978-952-5989-09-0, published August 2012 by Helsinki Kirjat.
- Viikinkipoika Kaspar: Sininen Viikinki ja Kuninkaan sotaratsu ("The Viking Boy Kaspar: Blue Viking and war knight of the King"), pages 392, ISBN 978-952-5874-57-0, published July 2011 by Helsinki Kirjat.
- Viikinkipoika Kaspar ("The Viking Boy Kaspar"), pages 239, ISBN 978-952-5874-22-8/ 978-952-5874-76-1 (ePub eBook). Published 2.February 2011 by Helsinki Kirjat.
- Rölli ja kultainen avain (Rölli and the Golden Key), ISBN 9789511270430. Published January 2013 by Otava.
