= Superman Returns (soundtrack) =

Soundtrack album by John Ottman and John Williams
- Released: June 27, 2006
- Genre: Film score
- Length: 55:27
- Label: Warner Bros.
- Producer: John Ottman

John Ottman and John Williams chronology
Fantastic Four (2005)	Superman Returns (2006)	Fantastic Four: Rise of the Silver Surfer (2007)

Professional ratings
Review scores
Source	Rating
AllMusic	4/5 stars
Filmtracks	5/5 stars
ScoreNotes	8.5/10 stars
SoundtrackNet	4.5/5 stars

Superman Returns (Music from the Motion Picture) is the soundtrack album for the 2006 film of the same name. The score is composed by John Ottman, interpolating music by John Williams, particularly "Superman March" from the Superman: The Movie.

Originally, director Bryan Singer contacted Williams on scoring the film, but Williams declined due to being busy scoring Star Wars Episode III: Revenge of the Sith and Steven Spielberg's War of the Worlds.

In 2013, La-La Land Records released a 2-disc limited edition of the soundtrack with an expanded track list.

== Track listing ==
No.	Title	Length
1.	"Main Titles"	3:49
2.	"Memories"	3:07
3.	"Rough Flight"	5:13
4.	"Little Secrets / Power of the Sun"	2:49
5.	"Bank Job"	2:21
6.	"How Could You Leave Us?"	5:49
7.	"Tell Me Everything"	3:13
8.	"You're Not One of Them"	2:22
9.	"Not Like the Train Set"	5:12
10.	"So Long Superman"	5:31
11.	"The People You Care For"	3:27
12.	"I Wanted You to Know"	2:56
13.	"Saving the World"	3:12
14.	"In the Hands of Mortals"	2:11
15.	"Reprise / Fly Away"	4:15

Tracks do not appear in the order that they occur in the film, but instead in a succession chosen by Ottman for listening purposes. Listeners interested in hearing the selections in score order may program the album thus: 1, 7, 2, 3, 8, 5, 4 (to 1:02), 6, 9, 10, 11, 4 (from 1:02), 13, 14, 12, 15.

== Limited Edition ==
La-La Land Records released a 2-disc Limited Edition album of the complete score to Superman Returns in commemoration of the 75th anniversary of Superman in December 2013.

Disc 1
No.	Title	Length
1.	"As Time Goes By§* / The Planet Krypton§*"	1:22
2.	"Main Titles§**"	2:44
3.	"Dying Wish*"	2:41
4.	"Homecoming* / Tell Me Everything§** / Stars in the Sky*"	5:52
5.	"Memories§**†"	3:15
6.	"Put Here for a Reason§†* / The World Keeps Spinning†* / Closet Case* / Daily Planet*"	2:22
7.	"Things Have Changed§* / Chip Off the Old Block†*"	1:41
8.	"Genesis Project* / Like Sea Monkeys*"	1:42
9.	"A Drop in the Bucket* / Is It Rite?*"	3:09
10.	"Boosters Non-Responsive* / Rough Flight§** / Home Run§*"	6:54
11.	"He's Back!*"	1:37
12.	"Superman Scoop* / Eavesdropping*"	1:19
13.	"To Lois' House** / You're Not One of Them**"	2:52
14.	"Bank Job§**"	3:23
15.	"Kitty Decoy§**"	3:38
16.	"Supermania§*"	1:07
17.	"Kryptonite*"	0:34
18.	"Little Secrets§"	1:06
19.	"How Could You Leave Us?§**"	7:05
20.	"They're Gone* / Bad Idea* / They Make Great Chandeliers* / Beach Front Property* / Lineage?*"	3:35
21.	"Not Like the Train Set**"	5:48
22.	"We Have to Go* / Who to Save?§*"	3:00

Disc 2
No.	Title	Length
1.	"Metropolis Mayhem§**"	4:03
2.	"Out to Sea§**"	2:44
3.	"So Long Superman§**"	7:12
4.	"Saving Superman** / Power of the Sun§"	5:29
5.	"Saving the World§**"	6:22
6.	"In the Hands of Mortals**"	1:16
7.	"Family Unit* / I Wanted You to Know**"	5:15
8.	"Lex's Paradise* / Change of Heart** / Parting Words§*"	4:55
9.	"Reprise§ / Fly Away**§"	4:15
10.	"End Titles§**"	3:55
11.	"Return to Krypton§* (synth mockup)"	5:05
12.	"Prelude§* / Main Titles§* (original extended version)"	4:01
13.	"Daily Planet* (alternate)"	0:21
14.	"GDIATFH Medley* (source)"	0:44
15.	"Heart and Soul* (source)"	0:39

§ Contains Superman Themes Composed and Conducted By John Williams
* Previously unreleased
** Contains previously unreleased material
† Contains material not used in film

=== Music not included in the soundtrack ===
There are several famous songs featured in the film but not included on the soundtrack album, which concentrated on the original score composed and conducted by John Ottman with themes from Williams' score for the original 1978 film.

According to the timeline they appear in the movie, the source music included:

- From 00:11:25 to 00:12:30, "The Flower Duet" from the opera "Lakmé" by Léo Delibes is used when Katherine "Kitty" Kowalski says Lex Luthor's friends are giving her creeps and Lex Luthor tells the story of Prometheus.
- From 00:47:36 to 00:47:54, The Drifters' rendering of the English version of Quando Quando Quando is featured when Clark Kent gestures to Lois Lane in a jam-packed elevator.
- From 00:50:50 to 00:52:08, the instrumental version of "Heart & Soul" by Frank Loesser and Hoagy Carmichael was performed by Jason when Superman overhears the conversation between Richard White and Lois Lane outside their house.
- From 01:04:52 to 01:05:41, "Spring" from Antonio Vivaldi's violin concerto "The Four Seasons" is featured when Katherine "Kitty" Kowalski is going to slap Lex Luthor for his cutting off her car's brake. The music is performed by the Budapest String Quartet.
- From 01:20:50 to 01:22:14, the aria "Habanera" from the opera Carmen by Georges Bizet is featured when Lois Lane investigates Lex Luthor's yacht. The music is performed by the Hollywood Studio Symphony.
- From 01:23:00 to 01:24:28, the 2nd movement called "Andante in F major" from Mozart's Piano Concerto No. 21 in C major K 467 is used when Lex Luthor "agrees" to Lois Lane's interview. The music is performed by The Concentus Hungaricus.

== Chart positions ==
Chart (2006)	Peak position
US Billboard 200	110
US Top Internet Albums	146
US Top Soundtracks	7
