= Tale of a Lake =

2016 film by Marko Röhr and Kim Saarniluoto

- Film poster
- Directed by: Marko Röhr; Kim Saarniluoto
- Written by: Antti Tuuri; Marko Röhr
- Produced by: Marko Röhr
- Narrated by: Samuli Edelmann; Johanna Kurkela
- Cinematography: Teemu Liakka
- Edited by: Kim Saarniluoto
- Music by: Panu Aaltio
- Production company: MRP Matila Röhr Productions
- Distributed by: Nordisk Film
- Release date: 15 January 2016
- Running time: 76 minutes
- Country: Finland
- Language: Finnish

Tale of a Lake (Finnish: Järven tarina) is a 2016 Finnish nature documentary film directed by Marko Röhr and Kim Saarniluoto. It is about lakes in Finland, their wildlife, and their place in Finnish folklore. The film features narration by Samuli Edelmann and Johanna Kurkela.

== Plot ==
Tale of a Lake is a nature documentary mixed with Finnish mythology. A central figure is the female water spirit Ahitar, daughter of the gods Ahti and Vellamo. The film passes through the seasons of a year and portrays Finnish lakes and their wildlife, discussing how the terrain and animals feature in folklore.

== Production ==
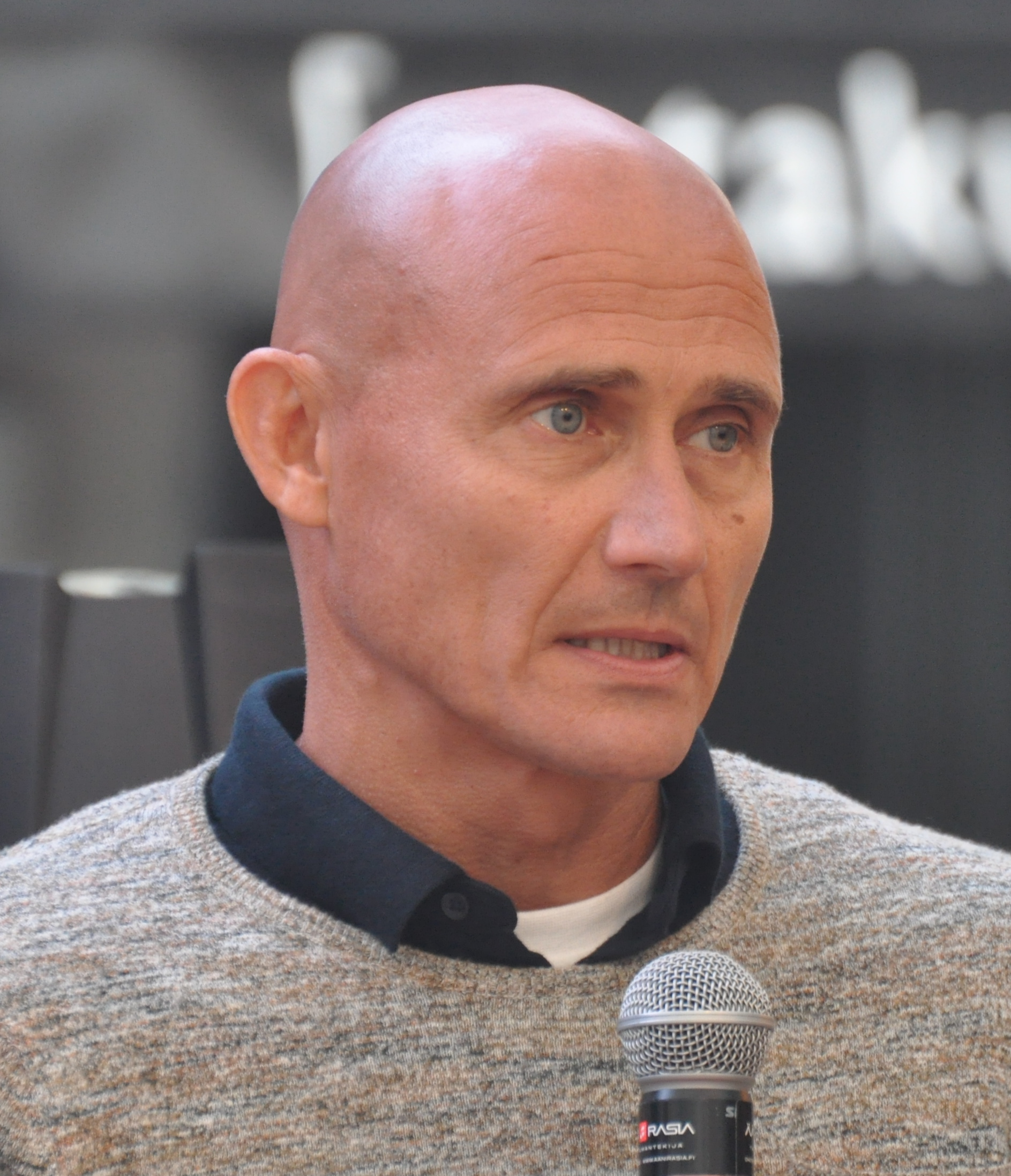
The writer, producer and director Marko Röhr in 2016

Tale of a Forest was produced by Marko Röhr for MRP Matila Röhr Productions with support from the Finnish Film Foundation, Yle, AVEK, the Raija and Ossi Tuuliainen Foundation and Creative Europe. Filming took place at various lakes in Finland between 2012 and 2016, with around 600 shooting days.

== Reception ==
Nordisk Film released Tale of a Forest in Finnish cinemas on 15 January 2016. It sold 191,000 tickets, which was the highest number ever for a documentary film in Finland.

Panu Aaltio received the 2016 IFMCA Award for Best Original Score for a Documentary and the 2017 Jussi Award for Best Original Score.

== Trilogy ==
Tale of a Lake is a standalone sequel to the 2012 film Tale of a Forest which is about forests and Finnish mythology. A third film in the series, Tale of the Sleeping Giants (2021), was filmed in the mountains of Sápmi.
