= Tale of the Sleeping Giants =

2021 film by Marko Röhr

- Film poster
- Directed by: Marko Röhr
- Written by: Antti Tuuri; Marko Röhr
- Produced by: Hanna Kauppi; Marko Röhr
- Narrated by: Peter Franzén
- Cinematography: Teemu Liakka
- Edited by: Ben Mercer
- Music by: Panu Aaltio
- Production company: MRP Matila Röhr Productions
- Distributed by: Nordisk Film
- Release date: 3 December 2021
- Running time: 77 minutes
- Country: Finland
- Language: Finnish

Tale of the Sleeping Giants (Finnish: Tunturin tarina) is a 2021 Finnish nature film directed by Marko Röhr. It is about the fells of Sápmi and is the standalone third entry in a series of nature films, after Tale of a Forest (2012) and Tale of a Lake (2016).

Originally set for release in 2020, Tale of the Sleeping Giants was postponed due to the COVID-19 pandemic in Finland. Without officially being premiered, it topped Finland's box-office solely from preview screenings. The official release date was eventually on December 3 2021.

== Synopsis ==
Tale of the Sleeping Giants revolves around the fells—barren mountains—of Sápmi in northern Europe. It is about the terrain, wildlife and mythology of the region.

== Production ==
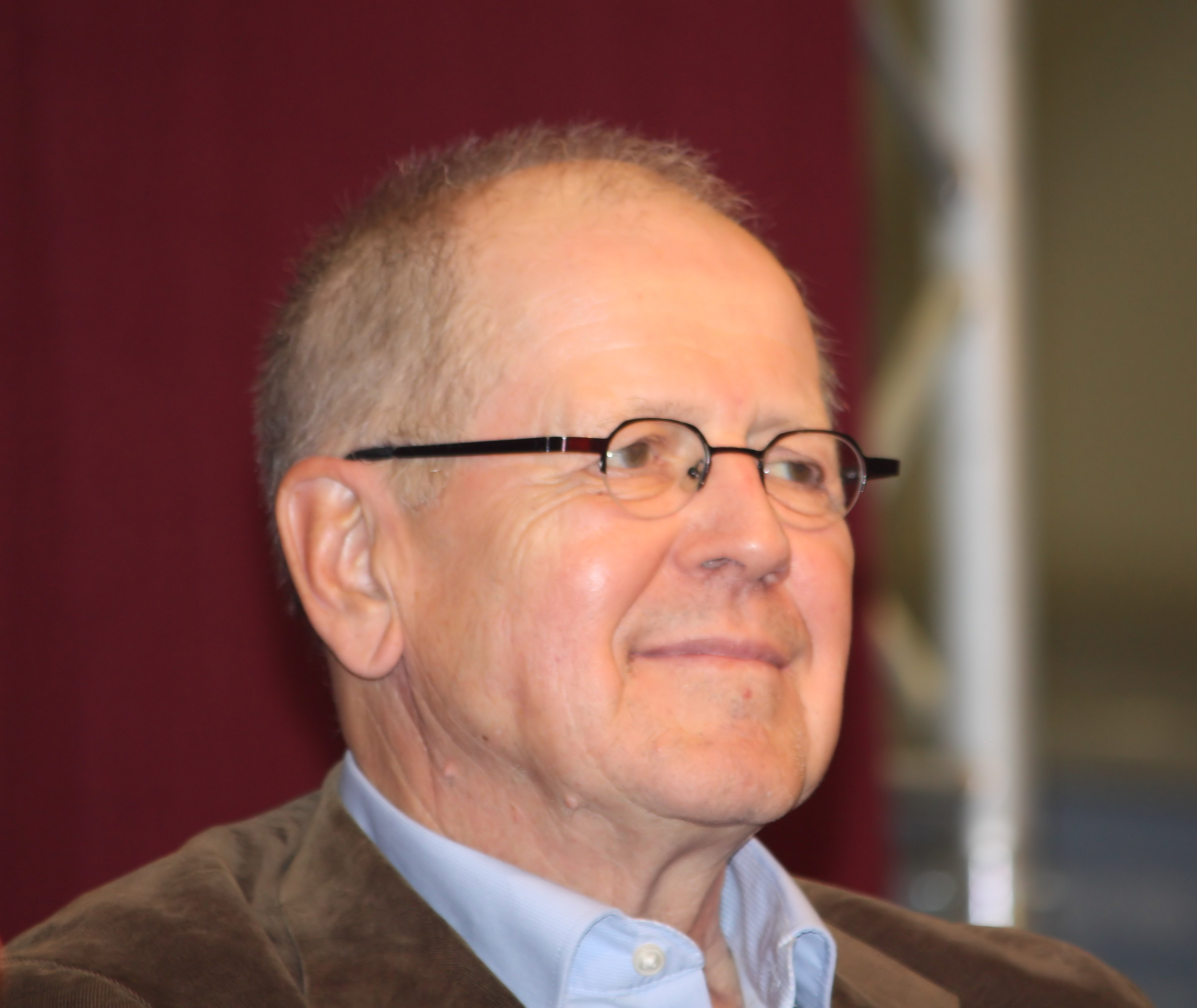
The screenwriter Antti Tuuri in 2013

Tale of the Sleeping Giants is based on an idea by Antti Tuuri and the screenplay was written by Tuuri and Marko Röhr. The film was produced by Hanna Kauppi and Röhr for MRP Matila Röhr Productions with support from the Finnish Film Foundation. It is the standalone third film in a trilogy about nature and mythology produced by MRP Matila Röhr Productions. By having an element of dramatic storytelling, it differs from the previous films, Tale of a Forest (2012) and Tale of a Lake (2016), which are straight nature documentaries, and it received funding from the Finnish Film Foundation's drama department, not its documentary department.

Filming took place over three years in northern Finland, Norway and Sweden. Production included sustained filming in temperatures as low as minus 42 degrees Celsius. The team recorded 850 hours of footage, which were edited into the 77 minutes of the finished film.

== Release ==
Distribution in Finland is handled by Nordisk Film. The Finnish theatrical release was initially set to 25 December 2020, but was postponed due to the COVID-19 pandemic in Finland. The premiere took eventually place on December 3 2021.

Because of the delay, there was time to create a subtitled translation in Northern Sami, which was used during some screenings. A 53 minutes long documentary about the making of Tale of the Sleeping Giants was broadcast on Yle TV1 on 5 April 2021. Without officially being premiered and due to the restrictions imposed on cinema operators, Tale of the Sleeping Giants was able to top the Finnish box-office in February 2021 only through preview screenings. As of December 1 2021, it had sold 18,119 tickets in Finland.

The film won the main prize of the 2025 European Wildlife Film Awards, worth €15,000, in the "Wildlife" category. The award is presented annually in Hamburg by the German Wildlife Foundation.

== Reception ==
Leena Virtanen of Helsingin Sanomat wrote that Tale of the Sleeping Giants follows the formula from the two previous films and it shows that the filmmakers have developed a shared vision, where Virtanen especially complimented the cinematography. She compared the narrative element where fells are portrayed as sleeping giants to Ailo's Journey, which used editing to create a dramatic story from nature footage. Virtanen described Panu Aaltio's soundtrack as powerful and effective in some scenes, but thought other scenes could have gained from not using music.
