= Panu Aaltio =

Finnish composer and record producer

- Born: Panu Aaltio; January 29, 1982 (age 44); Nurmijärvi, Finland
- Education: Sibelius Academy, University of Southern California
- Occupation: Composer
- Notable work: The Home of Dark Butterflies; Tale of a Forest; Tale of a Lake; Tale of the Sleeping Giants
- Awards: International Film Music Critics Association Award for Best Original Score for a Documentary (2012, 2016, 2021) Jussi Award for Best Music (2016)

Panu Aaltio (born 29 January 1982) is a Finnish film composer. He was educated at the Sibelius Academy and University of Southern California and established himself as a film composer with The Home of Dark Butterflies (2008). He has received the International Film Music Critics Association Award for Best Original Score for a Documentary three times, for Tale of a Forest (2012), Tale of a Lake (2016) and Tale of the Sleeping Giants (2021).

== Life and work ==
Panu Aaltio was born in Nurmijärvi on 29 January 1982. Wanting to become a film composer, he studied music technology at the Sibelius Academy in Finland, attended the Scoring for Motion Pictures and Television program at the University of Southern California and worked as an intern on film and television productions in Los Angeles. After returning to Finland, he became established there as a composer for feature films, television series and video games. The first feature film he composed a score for was The Home of Dark Butterflies (2008), for which he was nominated for the Jussi Award for Best Music.

Aaltio composed the music for a trilogy of nature films produced by MRP Matila Röhr Productions, Tale of a Forest (2012), Tale of a Lake (2016) and Tale of the Sleeping Giants (2021). For both Tale of a Forest and Tale of a Lake he received the International Film Music Critics Association Award for Best Original Score for a Documentary. Tale of a Lake also received the Jussi Award for Best Music.

== Selected filmography ==
- The Home of Dark Butterflies (2008)
- Sauna (2008)
- Hella W (2011)
- Body of Water (2011)
- Tale of a Forest (2012)
- I Won't Come Back (2014)
- Moomins on the Riviera (2014)
- The Island of Secrets (2014)
- The Find (2015)
- Tale of a Lake (2016)
- Lake Bodom (2016)
- Rolli and the Secret of All Time (2016)
- 95 (2017)
- The Eternal Road (2017)
- Super Furball (2018)
- Nature Symphony (2019)
- Ladies of Steel (2020)
- Peruna (2020)
- Finders of the Lost Yacht (2021)
- Tale of the Sleeping Giants (2021)
- Codename: Annika (2023)
