= Ballet Boys =

- Film poster
- Ballettguttene
- Directed by: Kenneth Elvebakk
- Written by: Kennet Elvebakk
- Produced by: Carsten Aanonsen
- Starring: Lukas Bjørneboe Brændsrød; Syvert Lorenz Garcia; Torgeir Lund
- Music by: Henrik Skram
- Production company: Indie Film AS
- Release date: March 18, 2014
- Country: Norway

Ballet Boys (Ballettguttene / Dancers / 芭蕾夢 / Ballettstrakar / バレエ・ボーイズ / Balettipojat / Балетные Мальчики / Balettpojkarna / Οι μπαλαρίνοι ) is a 2014 Norwegian documentary directed by Kenneth Elvebakk and produced by Indie Film in Oslo. The film is available in both for cinema (75 min) and television (59 min.) The documentary follows Lukas Bjørneboe Brændsrød, Syvert Lorenz Garcia, and Torgeir Lund over a four-year period as they pursue training in ballet. It documents their preparation for auditions, participation in international ballet competitions in France and Sweden, and their efforts to gain admission to professional ballet schools, including the Royal Ballet School in London. The film also examines the personal and professional challenges they encounter as they transition from adolescence into early adulthood.

The music in Ballet Boys is composed by Henrik Skram and performed by F.A.M.E.'S project, Macedonian Radio Symphonic Orchestra. The modern music is composed by Goran Obad. Ballet Boys is edited by Christoffer Heie, photographers are Torstein Nodland, Svend Even Hærra and Kenneth Elvebakk, sound mix by Bernt Syversen. The film poster is made by Daniel Barradas and photo by Jörg Wiesner. Ballet Boys had its theatrichal release in England in September 2014. Wide House is the films sales agent worldwide.

== Awards and nominations ==
- Winner of Best Youth Film (For Tomorrow award), Oulu International Children's and Youth Film Festival
- Winner of the Audience Award, Tromsø International Children's Film Festival
- Winner of Best Reportage, The International Festival of Films on Art in Montréal
- Winner of Best Original Music at the Norwegian TV Award "Gullruten" (Henrik Skram)
- Children's Jury 2nd Prize Documentary Feature Film, Chicago International Children's Film Festival
- Nominated for Best Original Score for a Documentary by the International Film Music Critics Association Award, IFMCA (Henrik Skram)
- Nominated for the Award SOS Kinderdörfer weltweit on DOK.fest in Munich
- Official Selection - DOC U Competition - IDFA 2014
