= Cutthroat Island (soundtrack) =

Studio album by John Debney
- Released: 1995
- Genre: Soundtrack
- Length: 70:31
- Label: Silva Screen FILMCD 178
- Producer: John Debney

John Debney chronology
Houseguest (1995)	Cutthroat Island (1995)	Sudden Death (1995)

The score for the pirate film Cutthroat Island was composed by John Debney.

The music was performed by the London Symphony Orchestra, with choral contributions by the London Voices and was conducted by David Snell.

Although the actual film was a commercial disaster, the score has been praised for its style, reminiscent of the Golden Age Hollywood swashbuckling scores by Erich Wolfgang Korngold. It has been noted as one of Debney's greatest compositions, alongside The Passion of the Christ. The score used traditional orchestration backed with choir, a practice Debney considered necessary to avoid the music's sounding "too old fashioned".

Particularly, conservative critics have considered this score as one of the best in the genre.

== 1995 release ==
Two CDs were released with the score in 1995, one of them by Silva studios, and another by Nu.Millenia Records. Both releases have the same tracks.

Track listing
No.	Title	Length
1.	"Main Title : Morgan's Ride"	4:38
2.	"Carriage Chase"	7:20
3.	"The Language of Romance"	2:39
4.	"Setting Sail"	1:03
5.	"To the Bottom of the Sea"	2:43
6.	"Morgan Takes the Ship"	4:30
7.	"The Funeral"	1:30
8.	"The Rescue"	3:41
9.	"Discovery of the Treasure"	2:19
10.	"The Big Jump"	2:38
11.	"The Storm Begins"	2:33
12.	"Morgan Captured/Sword Fight"	5:23
13.	"Shaw Steals the Map"	3:30
14.	"Escape from Mordechai's"	2:09
15.	"Charting the Course"	2:19
16.	"First Kiss"	1:54
17.	"The Battle"	6:29
18.	"Dawg's Demise/The Triumph"	3:31
19.	"It's Only Gold/End Credits"	9:42

== 2007 expanded edition ==
In 2007, Prometheus released a two disc special extended edition, which added 40 cues that were left out of the previous soundtracks or were not used in the film.

In August 2016, La-La Land Records re-issued the 2-disc set which sold out. Quaret Records re-issued the set again in 2023.

Disc 1
No.	Title	Length
1.	"Main Title : Morgan's Ride"	4:38
2.	"The Rescue/Morgan Saves Harry"	3:41
3.	"Purcell Snatcher" (composed by Brad Dechter)	2:58
4.	"Shaw is Caught"	1:15
5.	"The Funeral"	1:29
6.	"Morgan in Command"	2:51
7.	"The Language of Romance"	2:40
8.	"A Lady Scorned"	1:38
9.	"Carriage Chase"	7:21
10.	"Ainclee Plots/To Spittelfield"	3:46
11.	"Uncle Mordechai"	2:02
12.	"Morgan Captured/Sword Fight"	5:23
13.	"Escape from Mordechai's"	2:09
14.	"Setting Sail"	1:03
15.	"Charting the Course"	2:19
16.	"First Kiss/Love Scene/Dawg's Plan"	3:12
17.	"Shaw Discovers the Location"	2:04
18.	"Betrayal"	2:46
19.	"The Storm Begins"	2:33
20.	"To the Bottom of the Sea"	2:43
21.	"The Island"	3:41
22.	"Shaw Steals the Map"	3:30
23.	"Discovery of the Cave"	4:39
24.	"Discovery of the Treasure"	2:19

Disc 2
No.	Title	Length
1.	"The Wedding Waltz" (Composer unknown, orchestrated by Debney)	2:43
2.	"Caught"	1:37
3.	"The Rope"	2:17
4.	"Morgan and Shaw Jump the Cliff/The Big Jump"	2:38
5.	"Shaw Captured"	2:32
6.	"Morgan Takes the Ship"	4:30
7.	"The Hangman's Noose"	3:56
8.	"The Battle/To Dawg's Ship/Morgan Battles Dawg/Dawg's Demise/The Triumph"	17:52
9.	"It's Only Gold/End Credits"	9:33
10.	"Main Title/Morgan's Ride (Without Choir)"	4:48
11.	"Carriage Chase (Alternate Version)"	7:21
12.	"First Kiss (Album Edit)"	1:54
13.	"Dawg's Demise/The Triumph (Without Choir)"	3:31
14.	"Morgan's Ride & The Rescue (Original Synth Demo)"	7:25
