= Finders of the Lost Yacht =

Finnish film from 2021

- Directed by: Taavi Vartia
- Written by: Taavi Vartia
- Based on: Pertsa ja Kilu books by Väinö Riikkilä
- Produced by: Wille Lehtovaara; Johanna Kunttu
- Starring: Olavi Kiiski; Oskari Mustikkaniemi; Mimosa Willamo; Elias Westerberg; Hannes Suominen; Veeti Kallio
- Cinematography: Jyri Hakala
- Edited by: Ada Pajari; Benjamin Mercer
- Music by: Panu Aaltio
- Distributed by: Nelonen Media
- Release date: 14 July 2021
- Running time: 86 minutes
- Country: Finland
- Language: Finnish

Finders of the Lost Yacht (Finnish: Pertsa ja Kilu, lit. 'Pertsa and Kilu') is a Finnish film written and directed by Taavi Vartia. The film draws inspiration from the Finnish children's book series Pertsa ja Kilu by Väinö Riikkilä and specifically from the novel Viimeiset kaanit (eng. The Last Khans). The film follows the adventures of two best friends, Pertsa and Kilu, as they embark on a search for a lost treasure while trying to evade a robber.

The film stars Olavi Kiiski and Oskari Mustikkaniemi as Pertsa and Kilu respectively. The film also stars: Sara Vänskä, Mimosa Willamo, Elias Westerberg, Anu Sinisalo, Turkka Mastomäki, Ville Myllyrinne, Elsa Saisio and Hannes Suominen, among others.

The film premiered in July 2021 after being pushed back due to the COVID-19 pandemic and was the 10th most watched film in Finland for that year.

A sequel, Finders 2: Pharaoh's Ring, is currently in production.

== Critical reception ==
Episodi Niko Ikonen	3/5 stars
Film-O-Holic.com Jussi Lahtonen	4/5 stars
Helsingin Sanomat Pertti Avola	2/5 stars
Suomen Kuvalehti Tero Alanko	2/5 stars
Voima Ilona Iida Simes	4/5 stars
