= Hostel (film series) =

Horror film series

- Official film series logo
- Created by: Eli Roth
- Original work: Hostel (2005)
- Owners: Lionsgate; Sony Pictures
- Years: 2005–2011

Films and television
- Films: Hostel (2005); Hostel: Part II (2007); Hostel: Part III (2011)

Hostel is an American horror film series that consists of three films, including two theatrical films, and one straight-to-home release film. Created by Eli Roth, the plot centers around a Slovak criminal organization that lures innocent foreigners into their hostels, where wealthy sadists bid upon them for torture and murder. Over the course of the films, the hierarchy of the cult group is revealed to operate internationally.

The original film starring Jay Hernandez was met with mixed critical reception, although it was a success at the box office. The second film was met with an even more divided critical response; even though it earned less than its predecessor, it earned a profit for the studios. The third film was released to more positive reviews from critics than the previous movies, although its monetary statistics regarding sales on home media are not disclosed.

== Films ==
Film	U.S. release date	Director	Screenwriter	Producer(s)
Hostel	January 6, 2006	Eli Roth	Eli Roth	Mike Fleiss, Eli Roth and Chris Briggs
Hostel: Part II	June 8, 2007	Eli Roth	Eli Roth	Mike Fleiss, Eli Roth and Chris Briggs
Hostel: Part III	December 27, 2011	Scott Spiegel	Michael D. Weiss	Mike Fleiss, Chris Briggs and Scott Spiegel

=== Hostel (2005) ===
Paxton and Josh spend their summer after graduating college traveling the various countries in Europe. Exploring all manner of debaucherous activities, they befriend an Icelandic tourist named Óli. One night the trio are locked out of their hotel, and visit an apartment of a local named Alexei. After being told of a hostel run by seductive women in Slovakia, the friends make the journey to the rumored location. Upon arrival they are pleased to find that Alexei's story was true, a location overrun by nude foreign women. As they engage in various sexual encounters, over time they soon begin to question the intentions of the establishment. As Óli goes missing, the friends attempt to investigate his disappearance. When they are drugged by a pair of women with whom they had been associating in a sex-based relationship, they individually awaken to a horrific underground torture event, led by a secret organization. The company allows wealthy individuals to pay large sums of money to torture, maim, and kill abducted innocent tourists. Unwittingly finding themselves a part of the cult's activities, Paxton and Josh must fight for survival in the nightmare they've awoken in, or die by a series of gory events.

=== Hostel: Part II (2007) ===
After narrowly escaping the tortures of an evil secret organization, Paxton suffers from extreme episodes of PTSD. Convinced that the Elite Hunting Club will not stop looking for him until he is dead, he often comes into confrontation with his girlfriend who argues that his experience is exaggerated as a result of his mental illness. After one particularly heated argument, she awakes the next morning to find his headless corpse sitting in their kitchen, confirming his story.

In Rome, Italy three young American art students named Beth, Whitney, and Lorna are enjoying their time abroad in a foreign country. Encouraged by one of the nude models that they are sketching named Axelle, to visit a relaxing hostel located in Slovakia, the trio decide to make the journey to the isolated location. Expecting a relaxing stay at a luxurious spa, the friends quickly begin to question the underlying reality of what is going on around them. Unbeknownst to them, upon arrival their passports are uploaded for bid to the highest spender. Abducted by members of the organization, the friends awaken to a reality where they are positioned to be helpless pawns of torture and murder. The women resolve to fight for their survival, or die trying.

=== Hostel: Part III (2011) ===
Scott alongside his friends Mike and Justin, are celebrating a night of decadence in Las Vegas for his bachelor party. As they move through each club, they are persuaded by a pair of escorts to attend a secluded private party. The friends decide to take their partying up a level, and make the trip. Upon arrival they quickly learn that things are not as they seem. Imprisoned by the Slovak hosts, they find that they are intended to be used as party favors of nefarious wealthy bidders, who intend to torture, abuse, and kill them as they desire. As they fight for their survival, amongst a terrible bloodbath Scott soon discovers that one of his friends is also a part of the Elite Hunters Club and willingly led them into the sadistic nightmare they are trapped in.

== Television ==
In December 2020, tabloids reported that a reboot of Hostel film series was in development. By December 2023 however, Eli Roth stated that he intends to develop additional Hostel installments; stating "there's a lot more to do" and that he felt like he had "ignored them for too long". Acknowledging that he has ideas for where to take the story next, the filmmaker confirmed he also wants to return to intellectual property once again in the role of director after previously not being involved with Part III.

In June 2024, it was announced that a television series set within the franchise was in development. The series was described as a "modern adaptation" and "reinvention" of the concept, with the genre being categorized as an "elevated thriller". Roth will serve as director, as well as co-writer alongside Chris Briggs. The filmmaker will also be an executive producer, with Briggs and Mike Fleiss. Paul Giamatti had been cast in a starring role. The series will be developed by Peacock. In November 2026, it was confirmed that the series was no longer in development after Peacock passed on the project. However, Roth revealed that he and Briggs had already written scripts for the series and suggested he may reuse them for another project.

== Principal cast and characters ==
List indicators

This section includes characters who will appear or have appeared in the franchise in main roles.

- An empty grey cell indicates the character was not in the film, or that the character's official presence has not yet been confirmed.
- ^{C} indicates a cameo role.

Character	Films		
Character	Hostel	Hostel: Part II	Hostel: Part III
Character	2005	2007	2011
Principal cast
Paxton Rodriguez	Jay Hernandez	Jay Hernandez	
Josh Brooks	Derek Richardson		
Óli Eriksson	Eyþór Guðjónsson		
Kana	Jennifer Lim		
Yuki	Keiko Seiko		
Beth Salinger		Lauren German	
Whitney Swerling		Bijou Phillips	
Lorna Weisenfreund		Heather Matarazzo	
Scott			Brian Hallisay
Amy			Kelly Thiebaud
Mike			Skyler Stone
Justin			John Hensley
Kendra			Sarah Habel
Nikki			Zulay Henao
Victor			Nickola Shreli
Anka			Evelina Oboza
Elite Hunting Club
Natalya	Barbara Nedeljáková		
Svetlana	Jana Kaderabkova		
Jedi, the Desk Clerk	Milda Havlas	Milda Havlas	
Alexei	Lubomir Bukovy		
Dutch Businessman	Jan Vlasák		
American Client	Rick Hoffman		
Johann, the German Surgeon	Petr Janiš		
The Butcher	Josef Bradna	Ivan Furak	
Sasha Rassimov		Milan Kňažko	
Inya		Zuzana Geislerová	
Stuart		Roger Bart	
Todd		Richard Burgi	
Axelle		Vera Jordanova	
Miroslav		Stanislav Ianevski	
Roman		Roman Janecka	
Mrs. Bathory		Monika Malacova	
Carter			Kip Pardue
Travis			Chris Coy
Flemming			Thomas Kretschmann

== Additional crew and production details ==
Film	Crew/Detail					
Film	Composer	Cinematographer	Editor(s)	Production companies	Distributing companies	Running time
Hostel	Nathan Barr	Milan Chadima	George Folsey Jr.	Next Entertainment and Raw Nerve	Lions Gate Entertainment	1 hr 34 mins
Hostel: Part II	Nathan Barr	Milan Chadima	George Folsey Jr.	Next Entertainment and Raw Nerve	Lions Gate Entertainment	1 hr 34 mins
Hostel: Part III	Frederik Wiedmann	Andrew Strahorn	George Folsey Jr. & Brad Wilhite	Stage 6 Films, RCR Media Group and Next Entertainment	Sony Pictures Home Entertainment	1 hr 28 mins

== Reception ==
=== Box office and financial performance ===
Film	Box office gross			Box office ranking		Video sales gross	Worldwide total gross income	Budget	Worldwide total net income	Ref.
Film	North America	Other territories	Worldwide	All time North America	All time worldwide	Video sales gross	Worldwide total gross income	Budget	Worldwide total net income	Ref.
Hostel	$47,326,473	$34,914,637	$82,241,110	#1,909	#2,414	$23,882,146	$106,123,256	$4,800,000	$101,323,256	
Hostel: Part II	$17,609,452	$18,118,731	$35,728,183	#4,032	#3,730	$16,821,819	$52,550,002	$7,500,000	$45,050,002	
Hostel: Part III	—N/a	—N/a	—N/a	—N/a	—N/a	Information not publicly available	Information not publicly available	—N/a	—N/a	
Totals	$64,935,92534	$53,033,368	$117,969,293	x̄ #1,981	x̄ #2,048	>$40,703,965	>$158,673,258	$12,300,000	≥$146,373,258	

=== Critical and public response ===
Film	Critical		Public
Film	Rotten Tomatoes	Metacritic	CinemaScore
Hostel	59% (109 reviews)	55/100 ( reviews)	C−
Hostel: Part II	44% (112 reviews)	46/100 (21 reviews)	C
Hostel: Part III	67% (6 reviews)	—N/a	—N/a

== See also ==
- Sarajevo Safari
