= Hostel (disambiguation) =

A hostel is a budget-oriented, overnight lodging place where travelers rent accommodation by the bed as opposed to the whole room.

Hostel may also refer to:

== Housing ==
- In South Asia and elsewhere, a dormitory or other residence for university students
- In Nepal, a boarding school or dormitory for resident students at colleges

== Media ==
- Hostel (TV series), a 2003 Nepalese television series
- Hostel (film series), a horror movie series:
  - Hostel (2005 film), a 2005 American film
  - Hostel: Part II, the first sequel
  - Hostel: Part III, the second sequel
- Hostel (2011 film), a 2011 Indian Hindi film
- Hostel (2013 film), a 2013 Nepali film
- Hostel (2021 film), a 2021 Russian film
- Hostel (2022 film), a 2022 Indian Tamil film
