= List of Lionsgate films (2000–2009) =

This is a list of films produced and/or distributed by Lionsgate Films from 2000 to 2009. Since 1997, about 400 films have been released. As of November 2017, Lionsgate's films grossed approximately $8.2 billion.

Release date	Film	Notes
April 14, 2000	American Psycho	co-production with Edward R. Pressman Productions and Muse Productions
April 28, 2000	The Big Kahuna (Note: Co-owned by Revolution Studios)	North American distribution only; produced by Franchise Pictures and Trigger Street Productions
May 26, 2000	8½ Women	limited release; U.S. distribution only
June 16, 2000	Jesus' Son	Nominated - BIFA for Best Foreign Independent Film; North American distribution only; produced by Evenstar Films and Alliance Atlantis
July 7, 2000	But I'm a Cheerleader	North American distribution only; produced by The Kushner-Locke Company and Ignite Entertainment
July 21, 2000	The Eyes of Tammy Faye	limited release; distribution only
July 21, 2000	Love & Sex	limited release; U.S. distribution only
August 4, 2000	The Tic Code	limited release; North American distribution only
September 15, 2000	Urbania	limited release; U.S. distribution only
October 6, 2000	Taxi 2	limited release; U.S. distribution only
October 6, 2000	Two Family House	distribution only
October 12, 2000	Stardom	limited release U.S. distribution only; produced by Alliance Atlantis, Serendipity Point Films and Cinémaginaire
October 12, 2000	Faust: Love of the Damned	international distribution only; produced by Trimark Pictures, New Line Cinema and Filmax International, Inc. Premiered from Sitges Film Festival, it was released theatrically in late October 2001.
November 17, 2000	What's Cooking?	limited release; North American distribution only
December 29, 2000	Shadow of the Vampire	North American distribution only; produced by BBC Films, Long Shot Films and Saturn Films
January 26, 2001	February 15, 1839	limited release; U.S. distribution only Original title 15 février 1839
March 2, 2001	The Widow of Saint-Pierre (Note: Owned by Universal Pictures (via Focus Features))	limited release U.S. distribution only Original title La veuve de Saint-Pierre; Nominated - Golden Globe Award for Best Foreign Language Film
March 30, 2001	Amores perros (Note: Distribution rights currently owned by Mubi)	limited release; distribution outside Latin America only BAFTA Award for Best Foreign Film; National Board of Review Award for Best Foreign Language Film; Nominated - Academy Award for Best Foreign Film; Nominated - BIFA for Best Foreign Independent Film; Nominated - Golden Globe Award for Best Foreign Language Film
April 27, 2001	The Golden Bowl	North American distribution only; produced by Merchant Ivory Productions and TF1 International
May 11, 2001	Bread and Roses	limited release; North American distribution only Nominated - BIFA for Best British Independent Film
June 15, 2001	Songcatcher	limited release; North American distribution only
July 6, 2001	Lost and Delirious	limited release
July 13, 2001	Bully	limited release
August 10, 2001	All Over the Guy	North American distribution only; produced by Dietz/Land Productions
August 29, 2001	Nine Queens (Note: Global sales and remake rights currently owned by FilmSharks)	international distribution outside Latin America only; produced by Patagonik Film Group
August 31, 2001	O (Note: Owned by Miramax; Lionsgate would retain North American distribution rights under a deal with Miramax lasting from 2011 until 2020, when ViacomCBS acquired a 49% stake in the latter and worldwide distribution rights to its library)	North American distribution only; produced by Daniel Fried Productions
September 21, 2001	Liam	limited release
November 2, 2001	Tape	limited release
November 16, 2001	The Wash	co-production with Lithium Entertainment Group
November 30, 2001	Les Boys III	limited release
December 14, 2001	Lantana	limited release; North American distribution only Nominated - BIFA for Best Foreign Independent Film
January 18, 2002	State Property	co-production with Roc-a-fella Films
February 8, 2002	Monster's Ball	distribution only; produced by Lee Daniels Entertainment
April 12, 2002	The Cat's Meow	co-production with Dan Films and CP Medien
April 12, 2002	Frailty	co-production with David Kirschner Productions
April 19, 2002	Chelsea Walls	limited release; North American distribution only
April 22, 2002	Vulgar	distribution only
June 18, 2002	American Psycho 2	limited release
June 28, 2002	Lovely & Amazing	limited release; co-distribution with Roadside Attractions only Nominated - Independent Spirit Award for Best Film
July 29, 2002	Cube 2: Hypercube	limited release
September 20, 2002	Secretary	Nominated - BIFA for Best British Independent Film; Nominated - Independent Spirit Award for Best Film distribution only; produced by Double A Film, The Slough Pond Company and TwoPoundBag Productions
October 11, 2002	The Rules of Attraction	co-production with Kingsgate Films and Roger Avary Filmproduktion
October 18, 2002	The Grey Zone	limited release; North American distribution only
November 1, 2002	The Weight of Water	limited release; U.S. theatrical distribution only
December 20, 2002	Narc	international distribution outside the U.K., Ireland, Australia, New Zealand, Spain, Japan, Germany and Austria only; co-acquisition with Paramount Pictures and Cruise/Wagner Productions
December 27, 2002	Max	limited release; North American distribution only
March 7, 2003	Irréversible (Note: North American rights retained by Muse Productions, with distribution rights currently licensed to Altered Innocence)	limited release; North American co-distribution with Muse Productions only
April 11, 2003	House of 1000 Corpses	distribution only; produced by Goodrights Productions
April 25, 2003	Confidence	co-production with Ignite Entertainment
August 29, 2003	Civil Brand	limited release
September 12, 2003	Cabin Fever	distribution only; produced by Deer Path Films, Down Home Entertainment and Tonic Films
October 3, 2003	Wonderland	co-production with Flirt Pictures and Emmett/Furla Films
October 31, 2003	Shattered Glass	Nominated - Independent Spirit Award for Best Film co-production with Cruise/Wagner Productions, Baumgarten Merims Productions and Forest Park Pictures
November 26, 2003	The Cooler	North American distribution only; produced by ContentFilm, Pierce/Williams Entertainment, Furst Films, Gryphon Films, Dog Pond Productions, Visionbox Pictures and Zero Gravity Management
December 12, 2003	Girl with a Pearl Earring	Nominated - BAFTA Award for Best British Film; North American distribution only; produced by Archer Street Productions, DeLux Productions and Wild Bear Films
February 13, 2004	Monster Man	
February 27, 2004	Dirty Dancing: Havana Nights	U.S. distribution only; produced by Artisan Entertainment, Miramax Films, A Band Apart and Lawrence Bender Productions
March 5, 2004	The Snow Walker	limited release
March 26, 2004	Dogville	limited release; North American co-distribution with IFC Films only Nominated - César Award for Best Film from the European Union; Nominated - European Film Award for Best Film
April 2, 2004	The Prince & Me	international distribution outside France only; co-production with Paramount Pictures, Sobini Films and Epsilon Motion Pictures
April 16, 2004	The Punisher	U.S. distribution only; produced by Artisan Entertainment, Marvel Enterprises and Valhalla Motion Pictures
April 30, 2004	Godsend	co-production with 2929 Productions and Atmosphere Pictures
May 14, 2004	A Slipping-Down Life	limited release
May 26, 2004	The Day After Tomorrow	co-production with 20th Century Fox, Centropolis Entertainment, and The Mark Gordon Company; co-distributed by 20th Century Fox; co-owned by 20th Century Studios
June 23, 2004	Fahrenheit 9/11	co-production with IFC Films, Dog Eat Dog Films and Fellowship Adventures Group Critics' Choice Movie Award for Best Documentary Feature; Palme d'Or; Nominated - BIFA for Best Foreign Independent Film; Nominated - César Award for Best Foreign Film; Nominated - Gotham Independent Film Award for Best Documentary
August 6, 2004	Open Water	distribution only; produced by Plunge Pictures LLC and Eastgate Pictures
August 11, 2004	Danny Deckchair	limited release; North American distribution only
September 3, 2004	The Cookout	co-production with Flavor Unit Entertainment
October 15, 2004	The Final Cut	co-production with Industry Entertainment and Milestone Entertainment
October 29, 2004	Saw	distribution only; produced by Twisted Pictures
October 29, 2004	Stage Beauty	North American distribution only; produced by Tribeca Productions and BBC Films
December 3, 2004	I Am David	limited release; North American distribution only
December 17, 2004	Beyond the Sea	North American distribution only; produced by Trigger Street Productions
December 22, 2004	Hotel Rwanda	international distribution outside Italy only; produced by Miracle Pictures, Seamus Productions, Inside Track and Endgame Entertainment; distributed in North America by Metro-Goldwyn-Mayer under United Artists; Toronto International Film Festival People's Choice Award; Nominated - Critics' Choice Movie Award for Best Picture; Nominated - Golden Globe Award for Best Motion Picture - Drama
December 29, 2004	A Love Song for Bobby Long	North American theatrical and pay television distribution only; produced by Bob Yari Productions, El Camino Pictures and Crossroads Films
January 28, 2005	Alone in the Dark	U.S. distribution only; produced by Brightlight Pictures, Boll KG Entertainment, Herold Productions and Infogrames Entertainment
February 22, 2005	Cube Zero	
February 25, 2005	Diary of a Mad Black Woman	co-production with Tyler Perry Studios
April 13, 2005	State Property 2	co-production with Dash Films
April 15, 2005	House of D	limited release
April 30, 2005	Man-Thing	distribution only; produced by Artisan Entertainment, Marvel Entertainment, Fierce Entertainment and Screenland Movieworld
May 6, 2005	Crash	North American distribution only; produced by Bob Yari Productions, DEJ Productions and Bull's Eye Entertainment; Academy Award for Best Picture; Nominated - BAFTA Award for Best Picture; Nominated - BIFA for Best Foreign Independent Film; Nominated - Critics' Choice Movie Award for Best Picture; Nominated - Producers Guild of America Award for Best Theatrical Motion Picture
June 10, 2005	High Tension	also known as Switchblade Romance in the United Kingdom, Ireland and High Tension in North America; North American distribution only; produced by EuropaCorp
June 24, 2005	Rize	limited release
July 1, 2005	Undead	limited release
July 15, 2005	Happy Endings	limited release
July 22, 2005	The Devil's Rejects	co-production with Firm Films
August 12, 2005	Grizzly Man	limited release
August 26, 2005	Undiscovered	co-production with Lakeshore Entertainment
September 16, 2005	Lord of War	North American distribution only; produced by Saturn Films and Ascendant Pictures
October 7, 2005	Waiting...	distribution only; produced by LIFT Productions
October 14, 2005	House of the Dead 2	
October 21, 2005	2001 Maniacs	
October 28, 2005	Saw II	co-production with Twisted Pictures
October 28, 2005	Three... Extremes	limited release
November 23, 2005	In the Mix	U.S. distribution only; co-production with J&C Entertainment, Ush Entertainment and 20th Century Fox
November 25, 2005	Streets of Legend	limited release Original title Quattro Noza
January 6, 2006	Hostel	North American theatrical and worldwide television distribution only; co-acquisition with Screen Gems; produced by Next Entertainment and Raw Nerve
February 3, 2006	A Good Woman	limited release; North American distribution only
February 3, 2006	Tamara	limited release
February 24, 2006	Madea's Family Reunion	co-production with The Tyler Perry Company
March 17, 2006	Don't Tell	limited release Also known as Don't Tell
March 24, 2006	Larry the Cable Guy: Health Inspector	
April 14, 2006	Hard Candy	Nominated - BIFA for Best Foreign Independent Film distribution outside Spain, Australia and New Zealand only; produced by Vulcan Productions and Launchpad Productions
April 14, 2006	My Brother's Wife	limited release
April 28, 2006	Akeelah and the Bee	co-production with 2929 Productions and Starbucks Entertainment
May 19, 2006	See No Evil	co-production with WWE Films
June 2, 2006	Peaceful Warrior	limited release co-distributed in certain territories by Universal Pictures
June 21, 2006	Leonard Cohen: I'm Your Man	limited release
August 4, 2006	The Descent	North American distribution only
September 1, 2006	Crank	distribution outside the U.K., Ireland, France, Italy and Spain only; co-production with Lakeshore Entertainment and Radical Media
September 29, 2006	The U.S. vs. John Lennon	limited release
October 6, 2006	Employee of the Month	co-production with Tapestry Films
October 13, 2006	Deliver Us From Evil	limited release
October 27, 2006	Saw III	co-production with Twisted Pictures
January 5, 2007	Happily N'Ever After	First theatrical animated film; co-production with Vanguard Animation, Odyssey Entertainment, BAF Berlin Animation Film and BFC Berliner Film Companie
February 14, 2007	Daddy's Little Girls	co-production with Tyler Perry Studios
March 23, 2007	Pride	co-production with Cinerenta and Element Films
April 13, 2007	Slow Burn	North American, U.K. and Irish distribution only; produced by GreeneStreet Films and Sidney Kimmel Entertainment
April 27, 2007	The Condemned	co-production with WWE Films
May 4, 2007	Away from Her	limited release; U.S. distribution only
May 11, 2007	Delta Farce	co-production with Parallel Entertainment Pictures, Shaler Entertainment and Samwilla Productions
May 25, 2007	Bug	co-production with L.I.F.T. Productions, DMK Mediafonds International and Inferno Distribution LLC
June 8, 2007	Hostel: Part II	North American theatrical and worldwide television distribution only; co-acquisition with Screen Gems; produced by Next Entertainment and Raw Nerve
June 15, 2007	Fido	limited release co-distribution outside Canada with Roadside Attractions only
June 22, 2007	Sicko	produced by The Weinstein Company
July 13, 2007	Captivity	co-production with After Dark Films
August 3, 2007	Bratz	North American distribution only; produced by Crystal Sky Pictures, MGA Entertainment and Arad Productions
August 10, 2007	Skinwalkers	distribution outside Germany and Austria only; produced by After Dark Films
August 24, 2007	Right at Your Door	distribution only; produced by Roadside Attractions
August 24, 2007	War	co-production with Mosaic Media Group and Fierce Entertainment
August 31, 2007	To Rob a Thief	limited release
September 7, 2007	3:10 to Yuma	North American and select international distribution only; produced by Tree Line Film and Relativity Media
September 7, 2007	Fierce People	limited release produced by After Dark Films
September 21, 2007	Good Luck Chuck	co-production with Karz Entertainment; international rights outside the U.K., Ireland and the CIS licensed to Sony Pictures Releasing International
September 28, 2007	Trade	limited release
October 12, 2007	Why Did I Get Married?	co-production with Tyler Perry Studios
October 26, 2007	Saw IV	co-production with Twisted Pictures
November 9, 2007	Borderland	limited release
January 25, 2008	Rambo	North American co-distribution with the Weinstein Company only; produced by Millennium Films, Nu Image and Equity Pictures
February 1, 2008	The Eye	co-production with Paramount Vantage, Cruise/Wagner Productions and Vertigo Entertainment
February 19, 2008	Chaos	DVD release
February 22, 2008	Witless Protection	co-production with Parallel Entertainment Pictures, Shaler Entertainment and Samwilla Productions
March 7, 2008	The Bank Job	U.S., U.K. and Irish distribution only; produced by Mosaic Media Group, Relativity Media and Omnilab Media
March 21, 2008	Meet the Browns	co-production with Tyler Perry Studios
April 18, 2008	The Forbidden Kingdom	North American, U.K. and Irish co-distribution with The Weinstein Company only; produced by Casey Silver Productions and Relativity Media
August 1, 2008	The Midnight Meat Train	co-production with Lakeshore Entertainment, Midnight Picture Show and GreeneStreet Films
August 29, 2008	Disaster Movie	North American distribution only; produced by Grosvenor Park and 3 in the Box
September 5, 2008	Bangkok Dangerous	North American distribution only; produced by Initial Entertainment Group, Virtual Studios, Saturn Films and Blue Star Entertainment
September 12, 2008	The Family That Preys	co-production with Tyler Perry Studios
September 19, 2008	My Best Friend's Girl	co-production with Management 360, Terra Firma Films and Superfinger Entertainment
September 26, 2008	The Lucky Ones	limited release produced by Roadside Attractions
October 1, 2008	Religulous	limited release
October 17, 2008	W.	co-production with Omnilab Media and QED International
October 24, 2008	Saw V	co-production with Twisted Pictures
November 7, 2008	Repo! The Genetic Opera	co-production with Twisted Pictures
November 26, 2008	Transporter 3	North American distribution only; produced by EuropaCorp and Current Entertainment
December 5, 2008	Punisher: War Zone	co-production with Marvel Entertainment and Valhalla Motion Pictures; international rights licensed to Sony Pictures Releasing International
December 25, 2008	The Spirit	North American, U.K., Irish, Australian and New Zealand distribution only; produced by OddLot Entertainment
January 16, 2009	My Bloody Valentine 3D	first RealD 3D film to have a wide release in 3D–enabled theaters; co-production with Jack Murray Productions
January 30, 2009	New in Town	co-production with Gold Circle Films
February 20, 2009	Madea Goes to Jail	co-production with Tyler Perry Studios
March 6, 2009	Horsemen	limited release produced by Mandate Pictures, Platinum Dunes and Radar Pictures
March 24, 2009	Happily N'Ever After 2: Snow White—Another Bite @ the Apple	Direct-to-video; co-production with Berlin Animation Film and Kickstart Productions
March 27, 2009	The Haunting in Connecticut	co-production with Gold Circle Films
April 7, 2009	Jackets!	Direct-to-video
April 17, 2009	Crank: High Voltage	North American, U.K. and Irish distribution only; produced by Lakeshore Entertainment and Radical Media
May 1, 2009	Battle for Terra	North American co-distribution with Roadside Attractions only; produced by Snoot Entertainment and IM Global
July 31, 2009	The Cove	limited release North American co-distribution with Roadside Attractions only
September 4, 2009	Gamer	North American distribution only; produced by Lakeshore Entertainment
September 11, 2009	I Can Do Bad All By Myself	co-production with Tyler Perry Studios
September 23, 2009	Cabin Fever 2: Spring Fever	
October 2, 2009	More Than a Game	
October 23, 2009	Saw VI	co-production with Twisted Pictures
November 6, 2009	Precious	North American distribution only; produced by Smokewood Entertainment and Lee Daniels Entertainment
December 4, 2009	Brothers	U.S., U.K. and Irish distribution only; produced by Relativity Media, Sighvatsson Films and Michael De Luca Productions
