= Hiroyuki Kinoshita =

Japanese actor and voice actor (born 1958)

- 木下 浩之
- Born: October 23, 1958 (age 67); Saitama, Japan
- Occupations: Actor, voice actor
- Years active: 1982–present

Hiroyuki Kinoshita (木下 浩之, Kinoshita Hiroyuki; born October 23, 1958) is a Japanese actor and voice actor. He was born in Saitama.

== Filmography ==
=== Film ===
- Sennen no Koi Story of Genji (2001)

=== Television dramas ===
- Tokugawa Yoshinobu (1998) (Prince Kuni Asahiko)
- Aoi Tokugawa Sandai (2000) (Emperor Go-Yōzei)
- Mito Kōmon (2001) (Dr. Kogorō Matsumiya)
- Kōmyō ga Tsuji (2006) (Shimizu Muneharu)
- AIBOU: Tokyo Detective Duo (2007)

=== Television animation ===
- Ghost in the Shell: Stand Alone Complex (2002) (Yamaguchi)
- Detective Conan (2005) (Akira Sakuma)
- Detective Conan (2006) (Korn)
- Bakugan Battle Brawlers (2007) (Exedra)
- Bokurano: Ours (2007) (Sasami)
- Detective Conan (2007) (Kakuji Dejima)
- Blassreiter (2008) (Matthew Grant)
- Bakugan Battle Brawlers: New Vestroia (2010) (Exedra)
- House of Five Leaves (2010) (Yagi Heizaemon)
- Kindaichi Case Files R (2014) (Wang Long)
- Level E (2011) (Kyushiro Yumeno)
- Robotics;Notes (2012) (Hiromu Hidaka)
- Tari Tari (2012) (Shoichi Okita)
- One Piece (2013) (Rock)
- Aldnoah.Zero (2014) (Volf Areash)
- Chaika - The Coffin Princess (2014) (Simon Scania)
- Glasslip (2014) (Ken Fukami)
- Soul Eater Not! (2014) (Cafe Master)
- Go! Princess PreCure (2015) (Tsukasa Kaido)
- Ajin: Demi-Human (2016) (Ikuya Ogura)
- Knight's & Magic (2017)
- Megalobox (2018) (Fujimaki)
- Kingdom Season 3 (2021) (Orudo)
- Apocalypse Hotel (2025) (Owner)

=== Theatrical animation ===
- Utsunomiko (1989) (Kusuri)
- Jin-Roh: The Wolf Brigade (2000) (Atsushi Henmi)
- Detective Conan: The Raven Chaser (2009) (Korn)
- Ajin Part 1: Shōdō (2015) (Ikuya Ogura)

=== Video games ===
- Ace Combat Zero: The Belkan War (2006) (Joshua "LUCAN" Bristow)
- Tales of Xillia (2011) (Jilland)
- Borderlands 2 (2012, Japanese version) (Handsome Jack)
- Tales of Xillia 2 (2012) (Jilland)
- The Evil Within (2014, Japanese version) (Detective Sebastian Castellanos)
- Nioh (2017) (Edward Kelley)
- Starlink: Battle for Atlas (2019) (St. Grand)
- Fate/Grand Order (2020) (Zeus)
- Famicom Detective Club: The Missing Heir (2021) (Kanji Ayashiro)

=== Dubbing roles ===
==== Live-action ====
- Aaron Eckhart
  - The Dark Knight (Harvey Dent)
  - Battle: Los Angeles (Michael Nantz)
  - Erased (Ben Logan)
  - Sully (2020 The Cinema edition) (Jeff Skiles)
  - Wander (Arthur Bretnik)
  - The First Lady (Gerald Ford)
- Colin Firth
  - Bridget Jones's Diary (Mark Darcy)
  - Bridget Jones: The Edge of Reason (Mark Darcy)
  - Nanny McPhee (Cedric Brown)
  - Mamma Mia! (Harry Bright)
  - Mamma Mia! Here We Go Again (Harry Bright)
- The 4400 (Jordan Collier (Billy Campbell))
- 5x2 (Gilles (Stéphane Freiss))
- Ambulance (FBI Agent Anson Clark (Keir O'Donnell))
- American Beauty (2003 TBS edition) (Lester Burnham (Kevin Spacey))
- American Gods (Mr. World (Crispin Glover))
- Antarctic Journal (Lee Young-min (Park Hee-soon))
- Arbitrage (Det. Bryer (Tim Roth))
- The A-Team (Vance Burress / Agent Lynch (Patrick Wilson))
- Avalon (Murphy (Jerzy Gudejko))
- Avengers: Age of Ultron (Ultron (James Spader))
- Battle of the Sexes (Cuthbert "Ted" Tinling (Alan Cumming))
- The Beekeeper (Wallace Westwyld (Jeremy Irons))
- Beethoven Virus (Kang Mae (Kim Myung-min))
- Boardwalk Empire (Roy Phillips (Ron Livingston))
- Bones (Seeley Booth (David Boreanaz))
- The Brave One (David Kirmani (Naveen Andrews))
- C.B. Strike (Andrew Fancourt (Peter Sullivan))
- Chaos (Captain Martin Jenkins (Henry Czerny))
- Charlie Countryman (Nigel (Mads Mikkelsen))
- Che (Mario Monje (Lou Diamond Phillips))
- Chicken with Plums (Nasser-Ali (Mathieu Amalric))
- Crocodile Dundee (Netflix edition) (Michael J. "Crocodile" Dundee (Paul Hogan))
- Crossbones (William Jagger (Julian Sands))
- Darkest Hour (Viscount Halifax (Stephen Dillane))
- Déjà Vu (FBI Special Agent Paul Pryzwarra (Val Kilmer))
- Devils (Dominic Morgan (Patrick Dempsey))
- Dr. Dolittle: Million Dollar Mutts (Rick Beverley (Jason Bryden))
- Draft Day (Vince Penn (Denis Leary))
- Downfall (Gruppenfuhrer Hermann Fegelein (Thomas Kretschmann))
- Eastern Promises (Nikolai Luzhin (Viggo Mortensen))
- Elizabeth: The Golden Age (Robert Reston (Rhys Ifans))
- The Expendables (Toll Road (Randy Couture))
- The Expendables 3 (Toll Road (Randy Couture))
- Expend4bles (Toll Road (Randy Couture))
- The Eyes of Tammy Faye (Roe Messner (Sam Jaeger))
- Feedback (Andrew Wilde (Paul Anderson))
- Firewall (Gary Mitchell (Robert Patrick))
- Ford v Ferrari (Leo Beebe (Josh Lucas))
- The Foreigner (Dunoir (Max Ryan))
- From the Earth to the Moon (Alfred Worden (Michael Raynor))
- Get Smart (2011 TV Asahi edition) (Secret Service Commander (Stephen Dunham))
- Gossip Girl (Steven Spence (Barry Watson))
- The Grand Budapest Hotel (M. Gustave (Ralph Fiennes))
- The Guilt Trip (Benjamin Graw (Brett Cullen))
- Haute Cuisine (Jean-Marc Luchet (Jean-Marc Roulot))
- Haywire (Rodrigo (Antonio Banderas))
- A History of Violence (Thomas Stall / Joseph Cusack (Viggo Mortensen))
- Hostel (Óli (Eyþór Guðjónsson))
- House (Dr. Gregory House (Hugh Laurie))
- The International (Louis Salinger (Clive Owen))
- Joe Dirt 2: Beautiful Loser (Jimmy (Mark McGrath))
- Joker: Folie à Deux (Paddy Meyers (Steve Coogan))
- Just like Heaven (David Abbott (Mark Ruffalo))
- Kings of South Beach (Andy Burnett (Donnie Wahlberg))
- Life as We Know It (Sam (Josh Lucas))
- Life of Pi (Santosh Patel (Adil Hussain))
- The Machine (Vincent McCarthy (Toby Stephens))
- The Manchurian Candidate (Raymond Prentiss Shaw (Liev Schreiber))
- A Mighty Heart (Daniel Pearl (Dan Futterman))
- Momentum (Mr. "Washington" (James Purefoy))
- The Mule (Aaron Talbert (Billy Zane))
- Napoleon (Armand-Augustin-Louis de Caulaincourt (Ben Miles))
- Napoleon Dynamite (Uncle Rico (Jon Gries))
- The Outsider (Det. Ralph Anderson (Ben Mendelsohn))
- Pirates of the Caribbean: On Stranger Tides (The Spaniard (Óscar Jaenada))
- Possession (Ryan (Michael Landes))
- Private Practice (Pete Wilder (Tim Daly))
- Punisher: War Zone (Detective Martin Soap (Dash Mihok))
- The Ring Two (Max Rourke (Simon Baker))
- Ruby Sparks (Langdon Tharp (Steve Coogan))
- Secondhand Lions (Adult Walter Caldwell (Josh Lucas), Young Garth (Kevin Haberer))
- Sense8 (Joaquín Flores (Raúl Méndez))
- Seven Psychopaths (Hans Kieslowski (Christopher Walken))
- Shark Lake (Garreth Ross (Miles Doleac))
- Shooter (Bob Lee Swagger (Mark Wahlberg))
- Simon Birch (Ben Goodrich (Oliver Platt))
- Step Up Revolution (William "Bill" Anderson (Peter Gallagher))
- Still Alice (John Howland (Alec Baldwin))
- Submerged (Agent Fletcher (Vinnie Jones))
- Super 8 (Deputy Jackson Lamb (Kyle Chandler))
- Superman & Lois (Sam Lane (Dylan Walsh))
- The Suspect (Kim Seok-ho (Jo Sung-ha))
- Teenage Mutant Ninja Turtles (Eric Sacks (William Fichtner))
- Tomorrowland (David Nix (Hugh Laurie))
- Touch (Randall Meade (Titus Welliver))
- Tron: Legacy (Richard Mackey (Jeffrey Nordling))

==== Animation ====
- The Adventures of Tintin (Hergé)
- Batman: The Brave and the Bold (Two-Face)
- Father of the Pride (Siegfried)
- Fly Me to the Moon (Neil Armstrong)
- Incredibles 2 (Winston Deavor)
