= Jennifer Lim =

Jennifer Lim may refer to:

- Jennifer Lim (British actress) (born 1982), British actress
- Jennifer Lim (theatre actress) (born 1979), Chinese/Korean theatre actress
