= Tim Holmes (actor) =

American actor and musician

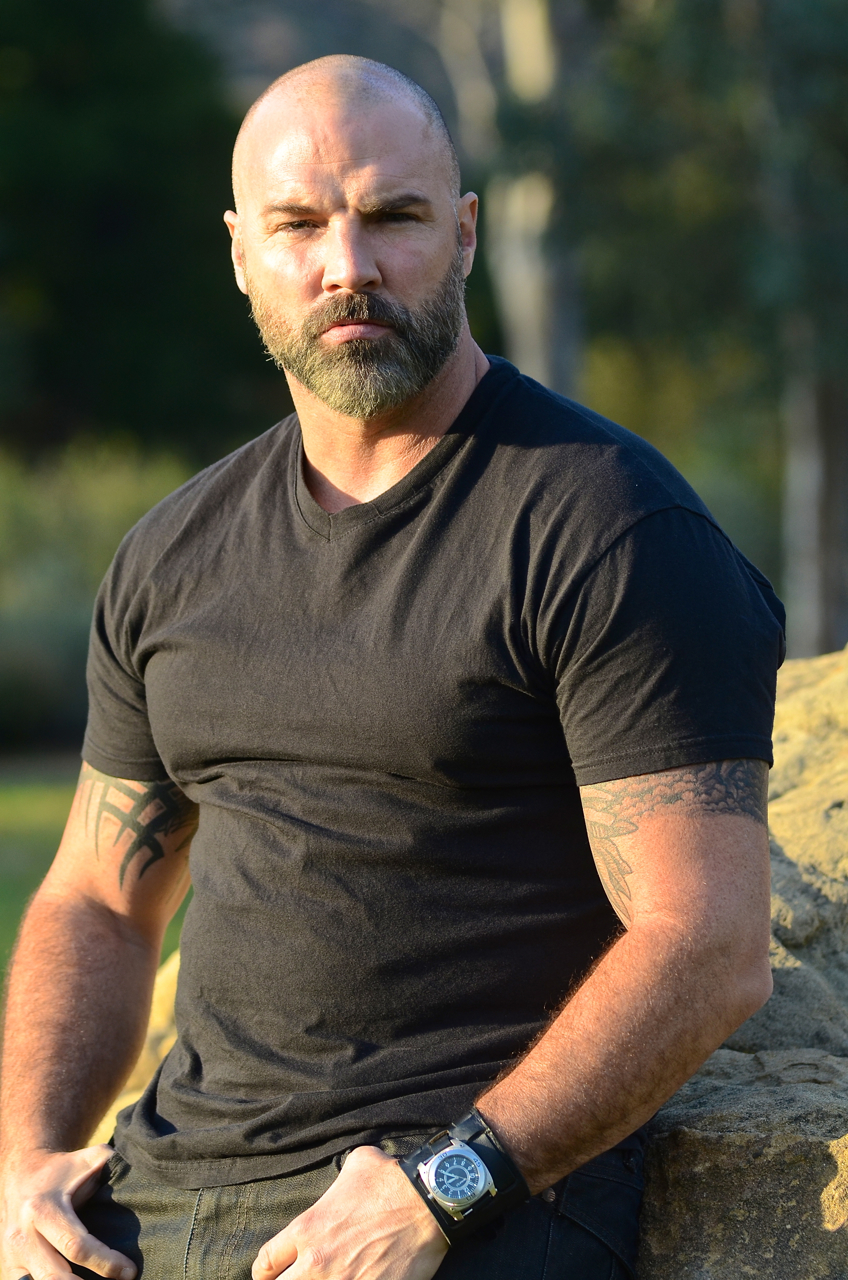
- Tim Holmes in March 2013
- Born: April 14, 1967 (age 58); Lansing, Michigan
- Other names: T.C. Holmes
- Occupation(s): Actor, musician
- Children: 2

Tim Holmes (born April 14, 1967), also credited as T.C. Holmes, is an American actor and musician.

== Early life ==
Holmes was born in Lansing, Michigan

== Career ==
After graduating high school, Holmes moved to Los Angeles to pursue his career in acting and music. In 1995 MCA Records signed him as a solo artist, under name T.C. Holmes. His contract was terminated after he completed one album. Afterwards Holmes enrolled at a fire academy and pursued a career as a firefighter, he worked for Warner Brothers Studio Fire Department for seven years.

In 2009 Holmes returned to his passion for acting. In the following years he appeared in Real Steel, Alex Cross, Machine Gun Preacher, Hostel 3, S.W.A.T.: Firefight, Street Kings 2: Motor City and Oz the Great and Powerful.

== Personal life ==
Holmes is married to Nicole Holmes, they have twin sons.

== Partial filmography ==
- Hostel: Part III (2011)
- Alex Cross (2012)
- Person of Interest (2012)
- Vegas (2012)
- Oz the Great and Powerful (2013)
- Ultimate Love Games (1997)
