= Motown Motion Picture Studios =

Motown Motion Picture Studios (Michigan Motion Picture Studios)
- Type: private limited liability company
- Industry: Motion picture
- Founded: 2011
- Fate: Closed
- Headquarters: 1999 Centerpoint Parkway, Pontiac, Michigan, United States
- Products: Movies
- Owner: Motown Motion Pictures LLC
- Number of employees: 12
- Website: mmpicturestudios.com

Motown Motion Picture Studios (was known as Michigan Motion Picture Studios and formerly Raleigh Michigan Studios) was located in the Detroit suburb of Pontiac and owned by Motown Motion Pictures LLC . Motown Motion Pictures was owned by Linden Nelson, A. Alfred Taubman and John Rakolta Jr., William Morris Endeavor Entertainment and Raleigh Entertainment (10%).

== Background ==
The studios were first developed in 2009 when the state had a generous film tax credit promoted by the governor at the time, Jennifer Granholm. Linden Nelson's son passed on how Michigan's film credits were a big topic of discussion at Cannes Film Festival.

== History ==
Nelson discussed with Ari Emanuel the idea of a Michigan production studio to take advantage of the tax break. Nelson and Emanuel formed Motown Motion Pictures LLC in May 2008. Soon two more investors were brought in to the company: John Rakolta Jr., a head of a commercial construction company, and A. Alfred Taubman. A former GM plant in Pontiac, Michigan, was purchased rather inexpensively in early 2009 for the studio.

Michigan's officials initially considered the studio to be a significant economic engine, since it was intended to establish the state as a legitimate contender in the 12-month-a-year film business. With Pontiac having a high unemployment rate and a financial emergency, the studio was seen as a way to diversify the economy of the city away from General Motors then given a bailout. The company pursued and got various government incentives. The city was pushed, over the objections of the financial manager, to waive property taxes and issued municipal bonds on behalf of the company. The bonds were backed by the state retirement system. The studio got assistance from a federal tax credit program with help from Edward B. Montgomery, the White House assistant for the automobile communities.

The studio was originally to be named Motown Motion Pictures, giving possible confusion with multiple businesses, particularly Motown Records. So in June 2009, the Raleigh Michigan Studios name was selected after Raleigh Entertainment, the company which would be managing the studio. Nelson indicated at that time that Emanuel had 20 pictures lined up to film at the studio. By September 2009, several colleges including Oakland University and Baker College started holding film classes at the studio.

The ground was broken on the studio on July 27, 2010, with the governor and other officials in attendance. The studios opened in summer 2011 and Raleigh Studios of Hollywood took over management of the facility. Raleigh Studios of Hollywood operated and marketed the studio, totaling 535,000 square feet (49,700 m^{2}) at the Pontiac Centerpoint Business Campus, until August 2012. The first big picture filmed at the studio was Disney's Oz the Great and Powerful.

Gov. Rick Snyder's 2011 rollback of state film credits caused some film producers to bypass the Michigan studio resulting in the studio investors to miss scheduled debt servicing payments and in August 2012 the studio defaulted on the entire $630,000 payment on the bond.

In August 2012, Raleigh Studios ended their management agreement with the studios. The owners of the facility then changed the name to Michigan Motion Picture Studios.

On June 22, 2018, it was announced that the building and the land comprising the studio would be sold to then-Commerce Township-based defense contractor Williams International Co. LLC. The sale of the property and two adjacent parcels spanning 120 acres was sold for $44 million.
