= Stanislav Yanevski =

Bulgarian actor (born 1985)

- Станислав Яневски
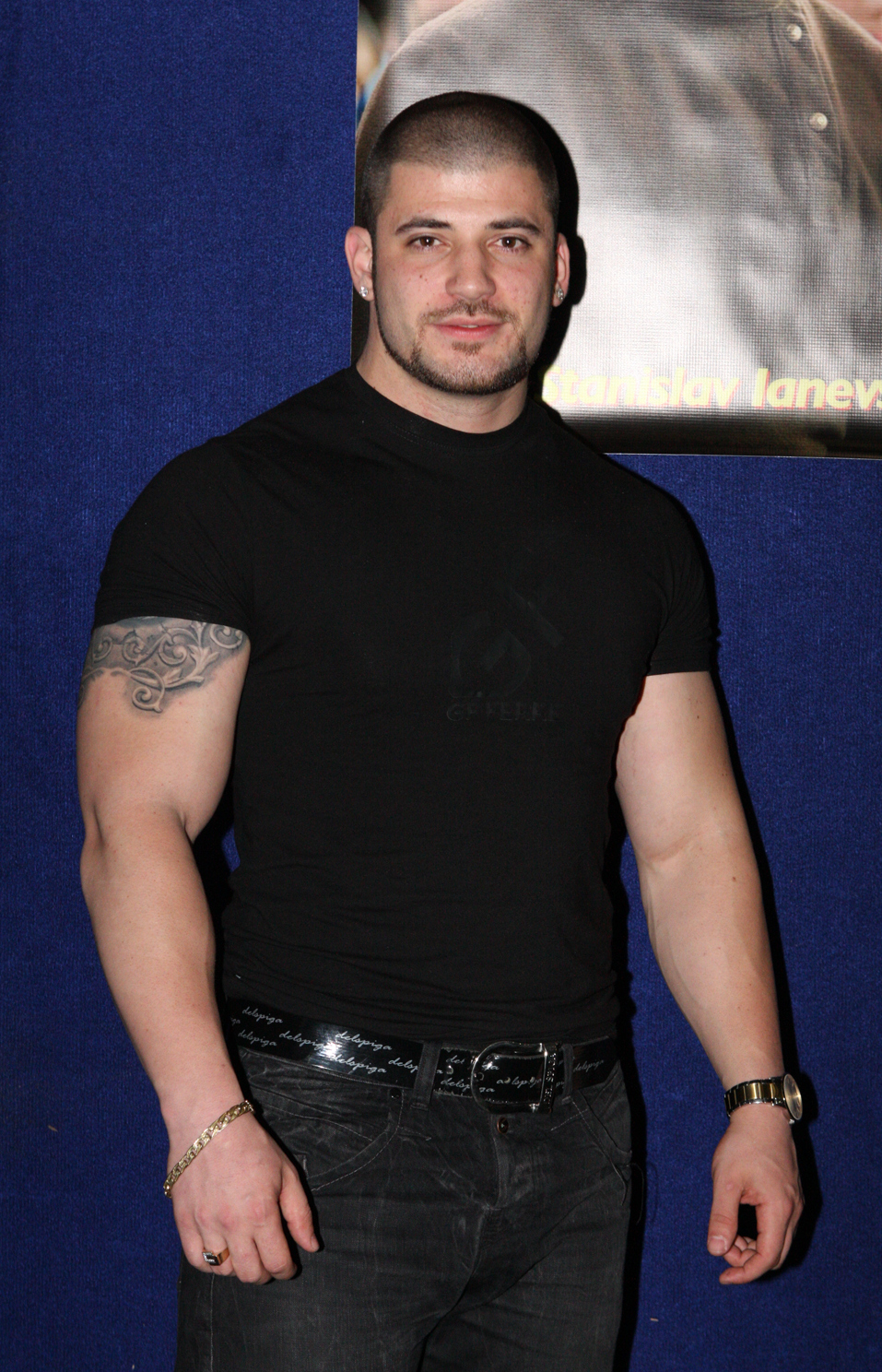
- Ianevski at Supanova Pop Culture Expo Hits Sydney in Australia in 2012
- Born: Stanislav Rumenov Yanevski; 16 May 1985 (age 41); Sofia, PR Bulgaria
- Occupation: Actor
- Years active: 2005–present

Stanislav Rumenov Yanevski (Bulgarian: Станислав Руменов Яневски, pronounced [stɐniˈsɫaf ˈjanɛfski]; born 16 May 1985) is a Bulgarian actor. He is best known for playing Viktor Krum in the 2005 fantasy film Harry Potter and the Goblet of Fire.

== Biography ==
Yanevski was born on 16 May 1985 in Sofia. He lived in England for five years as well as in Israel. While attending Mill Hill School in the United Kingdom with fellow Harry Potter actor Harry Melling, Yanevski had no particular acting aspirations and was not a drama student. He had only auditioned for Harry Potter and the Goblet of Fire after being spotted by Fiona Weir, a casting director who prompted him to attend an acting workshop, which resulted in his casting as Viktor Krum, a Bulgarian character in the Harry Potter series. He was selected from 650 others, most of whom had auditioned in Sofia. He also starred in Hostel: Part II, the sequel to Eli Roth's film Hostel.

== Film ==
Year	Title	Role	Director	Notes
2005	Harry Potter and the Goblet of Fire	Viktor Krum	Mike Newell	Acting debut
2007	Hostel: Part II	Miroslav	Eli Roth	
2010	Harry Potter and the Deathly Hallows – Part 1	Viktor Krum	David Yates	Deleted scenes
2011	Resistance	Bernhardt	Amit Gupta	
2015	The 11th Grade	(As himself)	Georgi Kostov	
2021	Last Man Down	Dr. Feltspat	Fansu Njie	

== Television ==
Year	Title	Role	Notes
2011	Undercover	Angel "Geleto" Yakimov	9 episodes
2013, 2015	Sofia Residents in Excess	Shepherd	3 episodes
