= Oz the Great and Powerful =

2013 film by Sam Raimi

- Theatrical release poster
- Directed by: Sam Raimi
- Screenplay by: Mitchell Kapner; David Lindsay-Abaire
- Story by: Mitchell Kapner
- Based on: Oz by L. Frank Baum
- Produced by: Joe Roth
- Starring: James Franco; Mila Kunis; Rachel Weisz; Michelle Williams; Zach Braff; Bill Cobbs; Joey King; Tony Cox
- Cinematography: Peter Deming
- Edited by: Bob Murawski
- Music by: Danny Elfman
- Production companies: Walt Disney Pictures; Roth Films
- Distributed by: Walt Disney Studios; Motion Pictures
- Release dates: February 13, 2013 (El Capitan Theatre); March 8, 2013 (United States)
- Running time: 130 minutes
- Country: United States
- Language: English
- Budget: $215 million
- Box office: $493.3 million

Oz the Great and Powerful is a 2013 American fantasy adventure film directed by Sam Raimi and written by David Lindsay-Abaire and Mitchell Kapner, from a story by Kapner. Produced by Walt Disney Pictures and Roth Films and distributed by Walt Disney Studios Motion Pictures and based on L. Frank Baum's early 20th century Oz books and set 20 years before the events of the original 1900 novel, the film is a spiritual prequel to the 1939 Metro-Goldwyn-Mayer film The Wizard of Oz. Starring James Franco in the titular role, Mila Kunis, Rachel Weisz, Michelle Williams, Zach Braff, Bill Cobbs, Joey King, and Tony Cox; the film tells the story of Oscar Diggs (Franco), a deceitful stage magician who arrives in the Land of Oz and encounters three witches: Theodora (Kunis), the Wicked Witch of the West, Evanora (Weisz), the Wicked Witch of the East, and Glinda (Williams), the Good Witch of the South. Diggs is then enlisted to restore order in Oz while struggling to resolve conflicts with the witches and himself.

It is Disney's third film adaptation of Baum's works, following Return to Oz (1985) and the television film The Muppets' Wizard of Oz (2005). Kapner began developing an origin story for the Wizard of Oz after a lifelong interest in wanting to create one for the character. Walt Disney Pictures commissioned the film's production in 2009 with Joe Roth as producer and Grant Curtis, Joshua Donen, Philip Steuer and Palak Patel serving as executive producers. Raimi was hired to direct the following year. After Robert Downey Jr. and Johnny Depp declined their titular role in January and February 2011, following their works as Iron Man and Tonto on The Avengers (2012) and The Lone Ranger (2013), Franco was cast. Filming took place from July to December 2011. Danny Elfman composed the music score for the film.

Oz the Great and Powerful premiered at the El Capitan Theatre in Los Angeles, California on February 13, 2013, and was first released theatrically in the United States by Walt Disney Studios Motion Pictures on March 8, 2013 in Disney Digital 3-D, RealD 3D and IMAX 3D formats. It received mixed reviews from critics and was commercially successful, grossing $493.3 million worldwide and becoming the highest-grossing Oz-related film until Wicked (2024). The film won the Phoenix Film Critics Society Award for Best Live Action Family Film and Kunis won the MTV Movie Award for Best Villain for her performance as the Wicked Witch of the West.

== Plot ==
In 1905, a circus magician and con artist Oscar Diggs escapes from a jealous strongman in a hot air balloon and is swept away by a tornado into the Land of Oz. Upon arriving, he meets the witch Theodora, who believes he is the wizard prophesied to defeat the Wicked Witch and become king of Oz. Hoping for wealth and fame, Oscar agrees to help her reach the Emerald City. Along the way, he befriends a flying monkey named Finley and later a living china doll whose village was destroyed by the Wicked Witch.

At the Emerald City, Theodora’s sister Evanora tells Oscar that the Wicked Witch is Glinda, daughter of the late king, who lives in the Dark Forest. Oscar sets out to destroy Glinda’s wand, believing it will defeat her. However, when he meets Glinda, he learns that Evanora is the true Wicked Witch and has manipulated him. After Evanora shows Theodora visions of Oscar becoming close to Glinda, the heartbroken Theodora eats an enchanted apple offered by Evanora, transforming into a green-skinned witch.

Glinda brings Oscar and his companions to her domain, where she reveals that she knows he is not truly a wizard but believes he can still help save Oz. Oscar devises a plan using illusions and machinery to frighten Evanora and her forces into retreating. While Glinda’s followers distract the witches’ army with mechanical decoys, Oscar secretly enters the Emerald City and stages his apparent death before reappearing as a giant spectral image accompanied by fireworks and smoke effects. Convinced that Oscar possesses real magical power, Theodora flees Oz, while Evanora is defeated after Glinda destroys her enchanted necklace, revealing her true appearance and banishing her from the city.

Oscar becomes the new ruler of Oz and continues projecting the illusion that he is a powerful wizard. He rewards his allies for their help, while Glinda and Oscar acknowledge their feelings for one another.

== Cast ==
- James Franco as Oscar Zoroaster Phadrig Isaac Norman Henkle Emmannuel Ambroise Diggs, commonly known as 'Oz', a philandering con artist, a stage magician and a barnstormer who is part of a traveling circus in the Midwest. He is whisked in a hot air balloon by a tornado to the Land of Oz, where he is believed to be a wizard destined to bring peace to the land, forcing him to overcome his dubious ethics to convince his peers he is the hero needed by the people of Oz. He eventually becomes what is known as the Wizard of Oz.
- Mila Kunis as Theodora, a naïve good witch who has the Land of Oz's best interests at heart. She believes that Oscar is the wizard prophesied to defeat the seemingly evil Glinda from the Dark Forest, developing an attraction to him in the process. Evanora gradually manipulates Theodora into thinking Oscar has betrayed her for Glinda, ushering her transformation into the Wicked Witch of the West.
- Rachel Weisz as Evanora, the protector of the Emerald City. Being the Wicked Witch of the East, she has a hideous form which she hides by wearing a necklace that gives her the appearance of a young woman. She deceives Oscar by framing Glinda for King Portus' murder, and telling Oscar that Glinda is the Wicked Witch rather than herself.
- Michelle Williams as Glinda, the daughter of the late king and the Good Witch of the South. She rules and protects a peaceful kingdom inside Oz, inhabited by kind Quadlings, tinkers, and Munchkins. Oscar originally believed her to be the Wicked Witch responsible for terrorizing the land. She guides Oscar to achieve his destiny of defeating Evanora, becoming his love interest in the process.
  - Williams also plays Annie, an old flame of Oscar's and the future mother of Dorothy Gale.
- Zach Braff as the voice of Finley, a winged monkey who pledges an irrevocable life debt to Oscar, believing him to be the prophesied wizard, for saving him from the Cowardly Lion. He quickly regrets his decision when Oscar reveals he is not a wizard, but nonetheless becomes his loyal ally.
  - Braff also plays Frank, Oscar's long-suffering yet loyal assistant in Kansas.
- Bill Cobbs as Master Tinker, the leader of the tinkers ruled by Glinda. He later builds the Tin Woodman.
- Joey King as the voice of the China Girl, a young, living china doll from China Town where everything, including its inhabitants, is made of china. Her home is destroyed by Evanora, leaving her its only survivor when she is found by Oscar, with whom she forms a strong friendship after he uses glue to fix her broken legs.
  - King also plays a young disabled girl volunteering in Oscar's magic show in Kansas.
- Tony Cox as Knuck / "Sourpuss", the quick-tempered herald and fanfare player of Emerald City, who is allied with Glinda.

Stephen R. Hart, Bruce Campbell, and William Bock play Winkie guards at the Emerald City. Abigail Spencer plays May, Oscar's temporary magic assistant in Kansas and one of his several fleeting loves in the film. Tim Holmes plays Vlad, the strongman who threatens Oscar for trying to court his wife (played by Toni Wynne), prompting Oscar to take the hot air balloon that sends him to the Land of Oz.

Raimi, who often casts friends and actor-regulars in cameo roles, cast his brother Ted as a small-town skeptic at Oscar's magic show who sees through one of his tricks, two of his former teachers – Jim Moll and Jim Bird – as well as Dan Hicks, Mia Serafino, and his daughter Emma as Emerald City townspeople and the three actresses from his 1981 directorial debut The Evil Dead – Ellen Sandweiss, Betsy Baker and Theresa Tilly – as well as his sons Dashiell and Oliver respectively as Quadling townspeople. Gene Jones portrays a wild west barker, Martin Klebba portrays a Munchkin rebel; John Paxton who previously worked with Raimi in the Spider-Man trilogy and Drag Me to Hell makes a posthumous appearance as an elder tinker, in his last film role before he died on November 17, 2011; while the great-grandson of Bert Lahr (played 1939 Cowardly Lion) also portrays a tinker.

== Production ==
=== Continuity ===
Oz the Great and Powerful features several artistic allusions, homages, and technical parallels to Baum's books, and the 1939 MGM film The Wizard of Oz.

As with the 1939 MGM film The Wizard of Oz, the first twenty minutes are gray-scaled in black-and-white and 1.33:1 full-screen, and the rest of the film is technicolored in color and 2.40:1 anamorphic widescreen, the 1933 Canadian animated film adaptation of Baum's original 1900 Oz book first introduced the idea of transitioning from black and white to color, (Note: The 1933 animated film was originally made in technicolor, but because it was made without proper licensing from the Technicolor Corporation (which limited use of its 3-strip process to Disney), it never received a theatrical release in color and was shown in black and white instead. The first known commercial release from 1985 is not an original color print, but has been colored to match the original intent of the filmmakers, which, as in the MGM film that followed, had the animated film go from black and white to color.) Glinda travels in giant bubbles and she kisses Oscar's forehead to protect him, and the Emerald City is actually emerald; whereas in the book, the Good Witch of the North kisses Dorothy on the forehead, and characters are compelled to wear locked-on green-tinted glasses, to make the city appear emerald, though during the battle preparations sequence Oscar can be seen wearing emerald goggles. Oscar's face is used as the projected image of the Wizard; in the book, the Wizard appears in his audience hall as a giant head, a beautiful fairy, a horrible monster, and a ball of fire, depending on what would most intimidate his visitor. The iconic green look of the Wicked Witch of the West is closer to her look in the 1939 film, as the Witch is a short, one-eyed crone in the book. The Wicked Witches, Theodora and Evanora, both nameless and unrelated in the book, are portrayed as sisters, an idea which originated in the 1939 film.

Also from the 1939 film is that several actors who play Oz characters make cameos in the Kansas segments, such as Frank, Oscar's assistant – whom he refers to as his "trained monkey" (Frank's "Oz" counterpart is the winged monkey Finley) – a young disabled girl who serves as the Kansas counterpart to China Girl (in Kansas, Oscar is unable to make the wheelchair-using young girl walk, and gets a chance to do so when he repairs China Girl's broken legs), and Annie who inspires Oscar to be a good and great person (Annie's "Oz" counterpart, Glinda, also inspires Oscar to be a better person) informs him that she has been proposed-to by John Gale, presumably hinting at Dorothy Gale's parents, as Annie is seen wearing a gingham dress, a pattern famously associated with Dorothy. (Note: He makes a young, svelte, rather hot conjurer who has broken many a heart, including that of Dorothy Gale's mom-to-be (liquid-eyed Michelle Williams, resplendent in a blond wig).) The names of Dorothy's parents are not mentioned in Baum's book, but Ellie Smith's parents are named John and Ann in the re-narrated novel The Wizard of the Emerald City by Alexander Volkov. Other referenced characters include the Scarecrow, who is built by the townspeople as a scare tactic; the Tin Woodman, whose creator is the Master Tinker that can build "anything", in the books, the Wicked Witch of the East enchanted a local woodsman to hack off his limbs, replacing them with hollow tin; and the lion that attacks Finley, a reference to the Cowardly Lion. (Note: There are other interesting "that explains it" moments as well: We get up-close-and-personal with the Cowardly Lion and find out what spooked him into being afraid of his own shadow. We get to know the Tin Man's father and the creators of the Scarecrow and learn more about Munchkinland.)

Various other races and species of Oz are depicted besides the Munchkins; the Quadlings, the china doll inhabitants of Dainty China Country, the Winkies (who went unnamed in the 1939 film), winged baboons (instead of winged monkeys in the book), and color-changing horses (inspired by the horse of a different color from the 1939 film). Similarly, Glinda is referred to by her title in the book (the Good Witch of the South), unlike the 1939 film, where her character's title is "Good Witch of the North" (due to merging the characters Good Witch of the South, and the North). Glinda is also the daughter of the late King of Oz, though in the books, Ozma is the King's daughter and Glinda is her protector. Evanora, the Wicked Witch of the East, wears an emerald necklace that gives her powers instead of magical shoes (which are silver in the book and ruby in the 1939 film) later worn by Dorothy.

The origins of the Wicked Witches are not explained in Baum's book, but Theodora's origins are borrowed from the revisionist novel Wicked: The Life and Times of the Wicked Witch of the West by Gregory Maguire. Theodora and Elphaba transition into Wicked Witches after learning of the Wizard's corruption (though in Wicked, Oscar is Elphaba's father), their skins changing green, Theodora from eating a green apple and Elphaba from a bottle containing a green drug that her mother drank out of before birthing her. Theodora's tears leave streak-like scars on her face, reflecting her weakness to water in the original story. Evanora transforms into a powerless hag after losing her necklace. In Wicked, Nessarose is paraplegic, but became powerful after wearing the magical shoes made by her sister Elphaba to allow her to walk. Oscar is portrayed as a womanizing con artist from Kansas, rather than a bumbling "humbug" of Omaha, Nebraska, in the book and a dictator in Wicked; in the 1939 film, the Wizard is from Kansas, although the hot air balloon he leaves in has "Omaha State Fair" on it. Also, Oz is presented as a real place as it is in the books, and not as a possible dream as the 1939 film implies.

=== Disney's history with Oz ===
After the success of Snow White and the Seven Dwarfs in 1937, Walt Disney planned to produce an animated film based on the first of Baum's Oz books. However, Roy O. Disney, the chairman of Walt Disney Productions, was informed by Baum's estate that they had sold the film rights to the first book to Samuel Goldwyn, who re-sold it to Louis B. Mayer in 1938. Ironically, the film was approved due to the success of Snow White. The project was then developed by Metro-Goldwyn-Mayer into the well-known musical adaptation which was released the following year.

In 1954, when the film rights to Baum's remaining thirteen Oz books were made available, Walt Disney Productions acquired them for use in Walt Disney's television series Disneyland which led to the proposed live-action film The Rainbow Road to Oz, which was abandoned and never completed. Disney's history with the Oz series continued with the 1985 film Return to Oz, which performed poorly, both critically and commercially, but has developed a cult following since its release, by fans of the books, who considered it a more faithful adaptation to the Oz books than the 1939 classic. After Return to Oz, Disney lost the film rights to the Oz books when they subsequently reverted to the public domain. In 2005, Disney produced the television film The Muppets' Wizard of Oz, which aired on its network ABC.

=== Development ===
Upon the release of the musical Wicked, screenwriter Mitchell Kapner felt he had missed his opportunity to explore the origins of the Wizard of Oz character. In 2009, he met with producer Joe Roth, who turned down his current pitches, and asked if he had any other ideas. Kapner, who had been reading the Oz series to his children, outlined the plots of the books. Roth stopped him on the sixth book, The Emerald City of Oz, which had some of the Wizard's backstory. Roth said:

"... during the years that I spent running Walt Disney Studios ... I learned about how hard it was to find a fairy tale with a good strong male protagonist. You've got your Sleeping Beauties, your Cinderellas, and your Alices; but a fairy tale with a male protagonist is very hard to come by. But with the origin story of the Wizard of Oz, here was a fairy tale story with a natural male protagonist. Which is why I knew that this was an idea for a movie that was genuinely worth pursuing."

Kapner and co-writer Palak Patel were turned down by Sony Pictures before the project was set up at Walt Disney Pictures in 2009. Disney president Sean Bailey commissioned Oz the Great and Powerful (under the working title "Brick") during the tenure of chairman Dick Cook, who was succeeded by Rich Ross, and later Alan Horn, a succession in management rarely survived by a major studio release. David Lindsay-Abaire was later hired to do a re-write.

Roth reportedly announced in 2010 that Robert Downey Jr. was a candidate for the title role of the Wizard. Sam Raimi was hired to direct in the same year from a shortlist including Sam Mendes and Adam Shankman. In January 2011, Downey declined the role, following his role as Iron Man in The Avengers (2012), and it was offered to Johnny Depp, who had previously collaborated with the studio in Pirates of the Caribbean and Alice in Wonderland. Depp liked the role but was already committed to The Lone Ranger. In February, James Franco accepted $7 million to star in the film, five months before filming was scheduled to begin. Franco and Raimi had previously worked together on the Spider-Man trilogy, in which Franco played Peter Parker's best friend Harry Osborn. Franco received training for the role from magician Lance Burton.

Kapner adapted the character of the Wizard from the novels to conceptualize an original story, and Raimi ensured that the film would "nod lovingly" to the 1939 film by inserting references and homages to it.

Disney wanted to reduce the film's production budget to $200 million. Casting calls were put out for local actors in Michigan.

=== Filming ===
Principal photography for Oz the Great and Powerful began filming on July 25, 2011 at Raleigh Michigan Studios in Pontiac, Michigan employing 3D cameras and completed filming on December 22, 2011.

Raimi opted to use practical sets in conjunction with CGI during filming. Physical sets were constructed so the actors could have a visual reference, as opposed to using green screen technology for every scene. Chroma key compositing was only used for background pieces. Zach Braff and Joey King were on set, recording their dialogue simultaneously with the other actors, whenever their CGI characters were present in a scene. Puppetry was employed for a physical version of the China Girl to serve as a visual key-point for actors to manipulate. Braff wore a blue motion capture suit to create Finley's movements, and had a camera close to his face for the flying sequences to obtain facial movements.

Art director Robert Stromberg, who collaborated on Avatar and Alice in Wonderland, drew inspiration from the films of Frank Capra and James Wong Howe to achieve the Art Deco design he envisioned for the Emerald City. Stromberg contrasted the colorful tonal qualities of Oz with the restrained appearance of Alice, affirming that although both films explore similar fantasy worlds, the overall atmosphere and landscape of each "are completely different". (Note: If you really broke it down, they're completely different: The elements in those two movies are completely different.) In 2011, Stromberg and his team visited the Walt Disney archives during the pre-production phase to reference production art from Disney's animated films such as Pinocchio, Bambi, Fantasia, Cinderella, Sleeping Beauty, Alice in Wonderland and Snow White and the Seven Dwarfs, drawing from designs and textures in order to give certain settings in the film an affectionate nod to the Disney style. Costume designer Gary Jones focused on authenticity with his wardrobe designs:

"We started by doing a lot of research and having ideas of the ways (costumes) should look, in order to be [historically accurate] but as we went on, we really began creating a whole new world."

My first instinct was, there are such iconic images in the Wizard of Oz movie, it would be wrong for us to re-create the Yellow Brick Road or the Emerald City in a different way. We had to go 180 degrees in the other direction. We're just going to have to make our own Oz.

— Sam Raimi on recreating the Land of Oz under legalities.

Although the film is a spiritual prequel to the 1939 Metro-Goldwyn-Mayer film The Wizard of Oz, it was not allowed legally to be considered as such. The filmmakers had to toe a fine line between calling the film to mind but not infringing upon it. To that end, Disney had a copyright expert on set to ensure no infringement occurred. The production team worked under the constraint of abiding by the stipulations set forth by Warner Bros., the legal owner of the rights to iconic elements of the 1939 film (via its ownership of Turner Entertainment, which possesses the pre-1986 MGM film library), including the ruby slippers worn by Judy Garland. Therefore, Disney was unable to use them nor any original character likenesses from the 1939 film. This extended to the green of the Wicked Witch's skin, for which Disney used what its legal department considered a sufficiently different shade dubbed "Theostein" (a portmanteau of "Theodora" and "Frankenstein"). Additionally, the studio could not use the signature chin mole of Margaret Hamilton's portrayal of the Wicked Witch of the West, nor could they employ the yellow brick road's swirl design for Munchkinland. The expert also ensured that the Emerald City was not too close in appearance to the original Emerald City in the 1939 film.

While Warner and Disney did not engage in copyright battle, they did file rival trademarks. In October 2012, Disney filed a trademark on Oz the Great and Powerful while one week later Warner filed its own trademarks for The Great and Powerful Oz. The U.S. Patent and Trademark Office suspended Warner's attempt at a trademark, because Disney had filed for basically the same trademark the week before.

In addition to the legal issues, the film was also faced with delays when several cast members went on hiatus due to unrelated commitments and circumstances. Rachel Weisz left halfway through the shoot to film her entire role in The Bourne Legacy, Michelle Williams was required to promote the release of My Week with Marilyn and Franco's father died during production. Roth compared the task of managing overlapping schedules to "being an air-traffic controller". Mila Kunis's makeup and prosthetics were supervised by Greg Nicotero and demanded four hours to apply and another hour to remove, with Kunis taking nearly two months to fully recover from the subsequent removal of the makeup from her skin. Raimi had to edit the frightening nature of several scenes to secure Disney's desired rated PG from the MPAA. Sony Pictures Imageworks was contracted to create the film's visual effects.

While the film was first released theatrically in color and in a 2.40:1 anamorphic widescreen aspect ratio, the film utilizes two technicolors and aspect ratios, black-and-white and 1.33:1 full-screen for the first twenty minutes of the film and color and 2.40:1 anamorphic widescreen for the rest of the film.

=== Music ===
In June 2011, composer Danny Elfman was chosen to score the film, despite Elfman and Raimi falling out over Spider-Man 2 and Elfman having declared they could never work together again. He noted that the film's score was accessibly quick to produce, with a majority of the music being written in six weeks. Regarding the tonal quality of the score, Elfman stated, "We're going to take an approach that's old-school but not self-consciously old-fashioned. Let the melodrama be melodrama, let everything be what it is. I also think there's the advantage that I'm able to write narratively, and when I'm able to write narratively I can also move quicker because that's my natural instincts, I can tell a story in the music."

American singer-songwriter and actress Mariah Carey recorded a promotional single called "Almost Home" written by Carey, Simone Porter, Justin Gray, Lindsey Ray, Tor Erik Hermansen, and Mikkel Eriksen (a.k.a. Stargate) for the soundtrack of the film. The single was released on February 19, 2013, by Island Records. The original soundtrack to Oz the Great and Powerful was released digitally and physically by Walt Disney Records on March 5, 2013. The physical CD release was released in association with Intrada Records on March 26.

== Release ==
=== Theatrical ===
Oz the Great and Powerful premiered at the El Capitan Theatre on February 13, 2013, and was released theatrically in the United States on March 8, 2013. Disney opened the film in wide release in 3,912 theaters. (Note: The 3‑D factor is going to give Oz [the Great and Powerful] a lift as well. Of the 3,912 theaters that will be screening the Wizard of Oz prequel, 3,056 will be 3‑D and 307 will be Imax theaters, and they'll be charging premium prices.)

To promote the film, Disney collaborated with IMAX Corporation and HSN to coordinate a hot air balloon campaign across the United States beginning in California at the Walt Disney Studios lot in Burbank, stopping at four locations; the El Capitan Theatre during the world premiere, the Disneyland Resort in Anaheim, the Daytona International Speedway in Florida and Central Park in New York City. Disney also promoted the film through its theme parks; Epcot's International Flower and Garden Festival featured a multi-purpose garden and play area themed to the film and Disney California Adventure hosted sample viewings inside the Muppet*Vision 3D theatre. The estimated marketing campaign cost upwards of $100 million.

=== Home media ===
Oz the Great and Powerful was released on Blu-ray 3D, Blu-ray, DVD, and digital download by Walt Disney Studios Home Entertainment on June 11, 2013. The film is Disney's first physical home video release to exclude a physical digital copy disc, and instead of a disc, it only provides a digital code for a download. Oz the Great and Powerful debuted at number one in its first week of physical home video release in overall disc sales with 46% of its first week sales from Blu-ray Discs. The film has earned $52 million in sales. Oz the Great and Powerful debuted on Disney+ on November 29, 2024.

== Reception ==
=== Box office ===
Oz the Great and Powerful earned $234.9 million in the United States, and $258.4 million in other countries for a worldwide total of $493.3 million. Worldwide, it was the thirteenth-highest-grossing film of 2013. Deadline Hollywood calculated the net profit of the film to be $36.4 million, when factoring together all expenses and revenues, making it the 13th most profitable release of 2013. It topped the box office on its worldwide opening weekend with $149 million. Before its theatrical release, several media outlets reported that Oz the Great and Powerful was expected to duplicate the box office performance of 2010's Alice in Wonderland. (Note: The fantasy film [Alice in Wonderland], which also opened in March, started with $116.1 million on opening weekend, but without the cachet of Johnny Depp and Tim Burton, it's unlikely that Oz[the Great and Powerful] will achieve such a gargantuan figure.) (Note: The company [Disney] is betting that a new twist on a story moviegoers already love will result in a hit on par with Alice in Wonderland, which took in more than $1 billion in 2010.) (Note: Oz [the Great and Powerful] could follow in the footsteps of Disney's Alice in Wonderland, another costly 3-D film, which opened on the same weekend in 2010 and went on to gross over $1 billion worldwide.) However, Oz accumulated less than half of Alice's worldwide gross. It remained the highest-grossing Oz-related film until December 2024 when it was out-grossed by Universal's Wicked, the first installment of that musical's two-part film adaptation.

Preliminary reports had the film tracking for an $80–100 million debut in North America. The movie earned $2 million from 9 pm showings on Thursday night. For its opening day, Oz the Great and Powerful grossed $24.1 million, the fourth-highest March opening day. During its opening weekend, the film topped the box office with $79.1 million, the third-highest March opening weekend. Despite the film's solid debut, which was larger than nearly all comparable titles, it clearly lagged behind Alice in Wonderland's opening ($116.1 million). The film's 3-D share of the opening weekend was 53%. Females made up 52% of the audience. Families represented 41% of attendance, while couples accounted for 43%. The film retained first place at the box office during its second weekend with $41.3 million.

Outside North America, the film earned $69.9 million on its opening weekend from 46 territories. Among all markets, its highest-grossing debuts were achieved in Russia and the CIS ($14.7 million), China ($9.06 million), France and the Maghreb region ($5.77 million). The film's openings trailed Alice in Wonderland in all major markets except Russia and the CIS. It retained first place at the box office outside North America for a second weekend. In total grosses, Oz's largest countries are Russia and the CIS ($27.4 million), China ($25.9 million) and the UK, Ireland and Malta ($23.4 million).

Many people, critics, and audiences also noticed the use of the film's art direction and technicolor scheme and aspect ratio both as a storytelling device and as a storytelling tool. The film begins at a full-screen aspect ratio of 1.33:1, while Oscar is in Kansas; in addition, the film's art direction and technicolor scheme are gray-scaled in black-and-white. After Oscar crash-lands into the Land of Oz twenty minutes into the film, the film's art direction and technicolor scheme and aspect ratio both transforms from gray-scaled black-and-white and a full-screen aspect ratio of 1.33:1 to color and an anamorphic widescreen aspect ratio of 2.40:1, and to more bright, fanciful, caricatured art direction and technicolor scheme. Oz the Great and Powerful was the first feature film since Galaxy Quest (1999) and Brother Bear (2003) to do an aspect ratio change. It was the first Disney film to use this technique since Brother Bear (2003).

=== Critical response ===
On review aggregator Rotten Tomatoes, Oz the Great and Powerful received an approval rating of 56% based on 270 reviews, with an average rating of 6.00/10. The site's critical consensus reads, "It suffers from some tonal inconsistency and a deflated sense of wonder, but Oz the Great and Powerful still packs enough visual dazzle and clever wit to be entertaining in its own right." On Metacritic the film holds a score of 44 out of 100, based on 42 critics, indicating "mixed or average" reviews. Audiences polled by CinemaScore gave the film an average grade of "B+" on an A+ to F scale.

Kim Newman, writing for Empire, gave the film 4 out of 5 stars and wrote

"If there are post-Harry Potter children, who don't know or care about The Wizard of Oz, they might be at sea with this story about a not-very-nice grownup in a magic land, but long-term Oz watchers will be enchanted and enthralled ... Mila Kunis gets a gold star for excellence in bewitchery and Sam Raimi can settle securely behind the curtain as a mature master of illusion."

Critic Alonso Duralde also admired the movie:

"That Oz the Great and Powerful is so thoroughly effective both on its own terms and as a prequel to one of the most beloved movies ever made indicates that this team has magic to match any witch or wizard."

Leonard Maltin on IndieWire claimed that

"No movie ever can, or will, replace 1939's The Wizard Of Oz, but taken on its own terms, this eye-filling fantasy is an entertaining riff on how the Wizard of that immortal film found his way to Oz."

Roth Cornet rated the film 7.8 out of 10 on IGN, and wrote

"The film is expansive and larger-than-life in scope and so are the performances, overall. Franco in particular hams it up and is often playing to the balcony ... The 3−D is utilized just as it should be in a children's fantasy epic such as this – overtly, but with skill. Snowflakes, music boxes and mysterious animals all leap through the screen towards the audience as the story unfolds."

Justin Chang of Variety had a mixed reaction, writing that the film

... "gets some mileage out of its game performances, luscious production design and the unfettered enthusiasm director Sam Raimi brings to a thin, simplistic origin story." He also compared the film's scale with the Star Wars prequel trilogy adding,
"In a real sense, Oz the Great and Powerful has a certain kinship with George Lucas's Star Wars prequels, in the way it presents a beautiful but borderline-sterile digital update of a world that was richer, purer and a lot more fun in lower-tech form. Here, too, the actors often look artificially superimposed against their CG backdrops, though the intensity of the fakery generates its own visual fascination."

/Film rated the film 7 out of 10, saying it had "many charms" while considering it to be

"basically Army of Darkness: (Normal guy lands in magical land, is forced to go on quest to save that land.) But just when you see Raimi's kinetic, signature style starting to unleash, the story forces the film back into its Disney shell to play to the masses. We're left with a film that's entertaining, a little scarier than you'd expect, but extremely inconsistent."

Richard Roeper, writing for Roger Ebert, noted the film's omnipresent visual effects but was largely disappointed by the performance of some cast members:

"... to see Williams so bland and sugary as Glinda, and Kunis so flat and ineffectual as the heartsick Theodora ..."

Marshall Fine of The Huffington Post was unimpressed, writing,

"Oh, it's exciting enough for a six-year-old; anyone older, however, will already have been exposed to so much on TV, at the movies and on the Internet that this will seem like so much visual cotton-candy. Even a sophisticated grade-schooler will find these doings weak and overblown."

Similarly, Todd McCarthy criticized the characterization, writing that the film's supporting cast

"can't begin to compare with their equivalents in the original ... so the burden rests entirely upon Franco and Williams, whose dialogue exchanges are repetitive and feel tentative."

Entertainment Weekly agreed, giving the film a C+ and saying that the "miscast" Franco

"lacks the humor, charm, and gee-whiz wonder we're meant to feel as he trades wisecracks with a flying monkey ... and soars above a field of poppies in a giant soap bubble. If he's not enchanted, how are we supposed to be?"

and complaining that "while Raimi's Oz is like retinal crack, he never seduces our hearts and minds." Alisha Coelho of in.com gave the movie 2.5 stars, saying "Oz The Great and Powerful doesn't leave a lasting impression, but is an A-OK watch."

== Accolades ==
Awards
Award	Date of ceremony	Category	Recipients	Result
Costume Designers Guild	February 22, 2014	Excellence in Fantasy Film	Gary Jones and Michael Kutsche	Nominated
Golden Trailer Awards	May 5, 2013	Best Animation/Family	"Witches"	Nominated
Golden Trailer Awards	May 5, 2013	Best Animation/Family TV Spot	"Super Hybrid"	Nominated
Golden Trailer Awards	May 5, 2013	Best Animation/Family TV Spot	"Music Box"	Nominated
Kids' Choice Awards	March 29, 2014	Favorite Movie		Nominated
Kids' Choice Awards	March 29, 2014	Favorite Movie Actress	Mila Kunis	Nominated
MTV Movie Awards	April 13, 2014	Best Villain	Mila Kunis	Won
People's Choice Awards	January 8, 2014	Best Family Film		Nominated
Phoenix Film Critics Society	December 17, 2013	Best Live Action Family Film		Won
Phoenix Film Critics Society	December 17, 2013	Best Production Design	Robert Stromberg	Nominated
Satellite Awards	February 24, 2014	Best Visual Effects	James Schwalm, Scott Stokdyk, Troy Saliba	Nominated
Satellite Awards	February 24, 2014	Best Art Direction and Production Design	Nancy Haigh, Robert Stromberg	Nominated
Satellite Awards	February 24, 2014	Best Costume Design	Gary Jones	Nominated
Saturn Awards	June 2014	Best Fantasy Film		Nominated
Saturn Awards	June 2014	Best Music	Danny Elfman	Nominated
Saturn Awards	June 2014	Best Production Design	Robert Stromberg	Nominated
Saturn Awards	June 2014	Best Costume	Gary Jones	Nominated
Teen Choice Awards	August 11, 2013	Choice Movie – Sci-Fi/Fantasy		Nominated
Teen Choice Awards	August 11, 2013	Choice Movie Actor – Sci-Fi/Fantasy	James Franco	Nominated
Teen Choice Awards	August 11, 2013	Choice Movie Actress – Sci-Fi/Fantasy	Mila Kunis	Nominated
Teen Choice Awards	August 11, 2013	Choice Movie Actress – Sci-Fi/Fantasy	Michelle Williams	Nominated
Visual Effects Society	February 12, 2014	Outstanding Animated Character in a Live Action Feature Motion Picture	Troy Saliba, In-Ah Roediger, Carolyn Vale, Kevin Souls for "China Girl"	Nominated

== Possible sequel ==
On March 7, 2013, Variety confirmed that Disney had already approved plans for a sequel, with Mitchell Kapner returning as screenwriter. Mila Kunis said during an interview with E! News, "We're all signed on for sequels". On March 8, 2013, Sam Raimi told Bleeding Cool that he had no plans to direct the sequel, saying, "I did leave some loose ends for another director if they want to make the picture", and that "I was attracted to this story, but I don't think the second one would have the thing I would need to get me interested". On March 11, 2013, Joe Roth told the Los Angeles Times that the sequel would "absolutely not" involve Dorothy, with Kapner pointing out that there are twenty years between the events of the first film and Dorothy's arrival, and "a lot can happen in that time". Since then, Disney has not begun development on a sequel.

== See also ==
- Adaptations of The Wizard of Oz
- List of films about witchcraft
