= Eyþór Guðjónsson =

Icelandic actor

- Born: February 5, 1968 (age 58); Iceland

Eyþór Guðjónsson (born February 5, 1968), often anglicized as Eythor Gudjonsson, is an Icelandic actor.

He got his first big role in the 2005 horror movie Hostel, where he plays an Icelandic backpacker named Óli, traveling through Europe with American backpackers Paxton (Jay Hernandez) and Josh (Derek Richardson) where they get lured to a Slovak hostel with a gruesome secret. Eli Roth wrote the role of Óli for Eyþór. He had never acted before Hostel, but Roth found him so charismatic and charming that he created the role for him. Eyþór proved to be very popular with audiences and critics in America and around the world. Eyþór was an assistant producer on Hostel: Part II. He opened an activity park in Reykjavík in 2009.

== Filmography ==
- Hostel (2005)
