= Vera Jordanova =

Bulgarian-Finnish-American model and actress

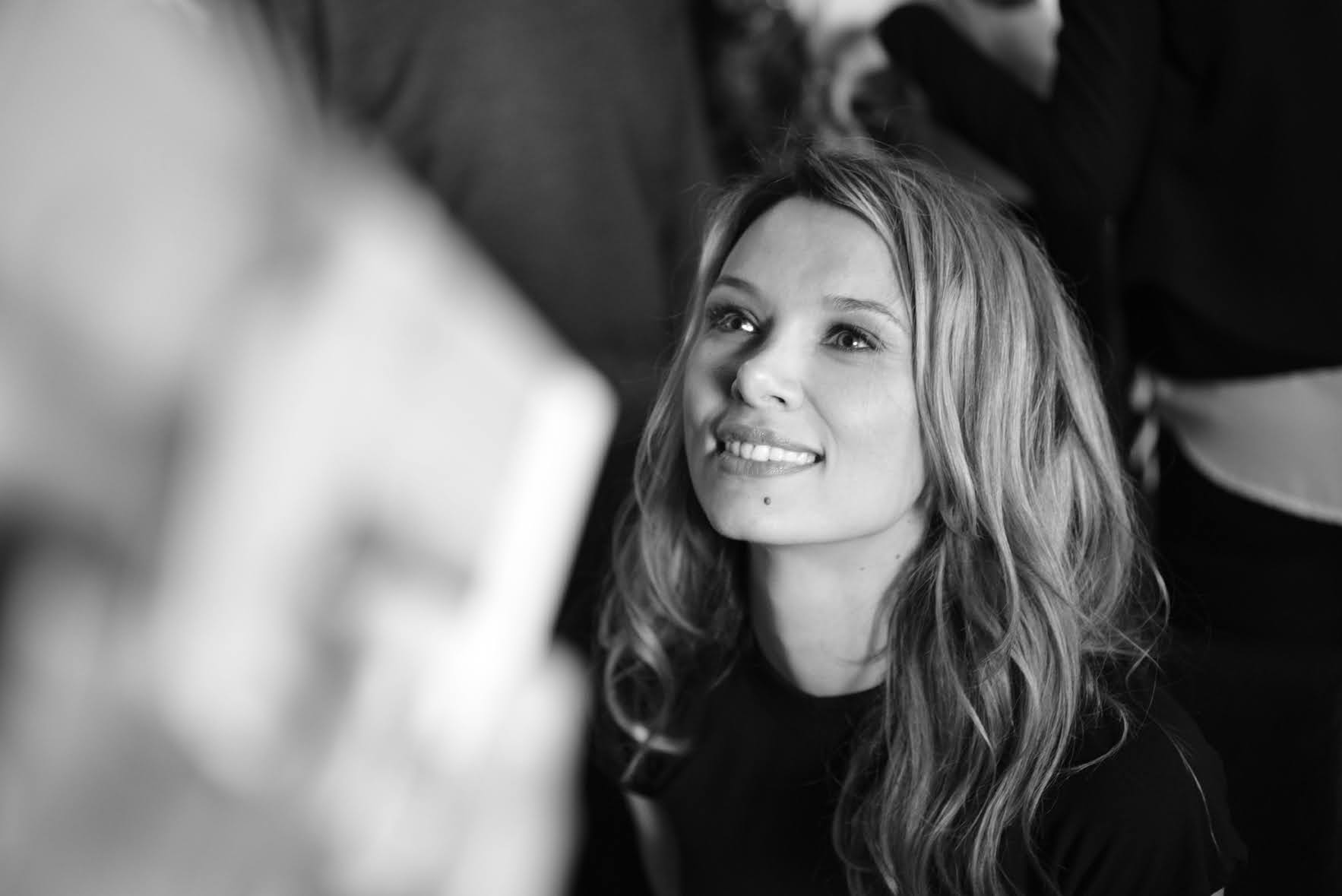
- Born: 28 August 1975 (age 51); Helsinki, Finland
- Citizenship: Finland, Bulgaria
- Occupations: Actress; author; model
- Modeling information
- Height: 1.80 m (5 ft 11 in)
- Hair color: Brown
- Eye color: Green
- Agency: Iconic Focus
- Website: www.verajordanova.com

Vera Jordanova (Bulgarian: Вера Йорданова; born 28 August 1975) is a Bulgarian-Finnish model, actress and cookbook author.

== Early life ==
Vera Jordanova was born on 28 August 1975 in Helsinki, Finland, to Bulgarian musicians. Due to Jordanova's parents' profession, Vera spent the early part of her youth traveling with them in Scandinavia. At the age of seven, Vera was relocated to live with her grandmother in Bulgaria where she started school. In her teens, Jordanova's parents relocated the family to Finland where she graduated from high-school specializing in language studies. She is fluent in Bulgarian, Finnish and English and speaks some Russian and has basic knowledge of Spanish and French.

== Career ==
=== Modeling ===
Shortly after she moved to Finland, she was discovered by the premiere Finnish modeling agency Paparazzi. Soon Vera was seen on national magazine covers, advertising campaigns, TV commercials and became a familiar face in the Finnish media. Modeling opened the doors to traveling abroad and with that to work for internationally known designers and brands. Vera spent the next ten years living and working in Milan, Paris, Hamburg, Cape Town, Barcelona, Miami, Los Angeles and New York. and the Czech Republic's June 2007 edition of Esquire. Vera has modeled for designers and brands such as Karl Lagerfeld, Thierry Mugler, Isabel Marant, Jean Charles de Castelbajac, Claude Montana, Armand Basi, Clarins, Marimekko, Felina Lingerie, Bacardi, Budweiser, Schweppes, Speedo, Lexus, Saks 5th Ave and Stilla to name a few. Jordanova was featured in the 2006 Maxim calendar and has appeared in FHM and the Czech Republic's June 2007 edition of Esquire.

=== Acting ===
Jordanova started her acting career in Finland, where she appeared in a few Finnish TV series, such as Isänmaan Toivot. Her debut in American cinema was in Eli Roth's horror sequel Hostel II, playing the part of Axelle, a mysterious woman who works for Elite Hunting to lure tourists into the Slovak "death factory" for worldwide clientele of torture aficionados.

In 2021, Vera landed the main role in the Bulgarian TV drama series Belezi, where she portrays the provocative and manipulative Vera Dermendjieva.

=== Cookbook ===
In 2014 Vera published a memoir cookbook Don't Miss a Bite: Stories and Flavors from around the World (WSOY). The book, which was first published in Finland, explores food, culture, and identity in the form of 100 recipes, short biographical stories and Vera's own drawings and photography.

== Publications ==
- Don't Miss a Bite: Stories and Flavors from around the World. Helsinki: WSOY. 2014. ISBN 978-9-5104-0643-4.

== Filmography ==
Year	Film	Role
1993	Harjunpää ja kiusantekijät	Model
2007	Hostel: Part II	Axelle Rassimov

== Television ==
Year	Show	Role	Note
1994	Venla Gaala 1993	Herself	
1998–1999	Tähtitehdas	Minkki Karvonen	
1998	Maailman pisin talk show	Herself	
1999–2001	Joonas Hytönen show	Herself	2 episodes
2000	Isänmaan toivot	Vellu's Girlfriend	1 episode
2006	Blow Out	Herself	1 episode
2007	Up Close with Carrie Keagan	Herself	1 episode
2014	Puoli Seitsemän	Herself	1 episode
2021	Belezi	Vera Dermenzhdieva	14 episodes

== Music videos ==
Year	Song	Artist	Role
2006	Colorful	Rocco Deluca	Model and dancer
