= George Folsey Jr. =

American film producer (1939–2024)

- Born: January 17, 1939; Los Angeles, California, U.S.
- Died: December 29, 2024 (aged 85); Los Angeles, California, U.S.
- Education: Pomona College
- Occupations: Film producer; editor; assistant director
- Years active: 1967–2024
- Notable work: Animal House; The Blues Brothers; Coming to America

George Joseph Folsey Jr. (January 17, 1939 – December 29, 2024) was an American film producer, editor, and assistant director.

== Life and career ==
Folsey was born in Los Angeles on January 17, 1939, the son of George J. Folsey. He was educated at Pomona College.

Folsey began his career at KABC-TV in Los Angeles, before moving into film. He frequently worked with director John Landis in the 1980s. In 1987, he was acquitted in a manslaughter case brought over the deaths of actor Vic Morrow and two children in a helicopter accident on the set of Twilight Zone: The Movie.

Folsey and his wife, Belinda, had two children. He died from pneumonia in Los Angeles on December 29, 2024, at the age of 85.

At the 97th Academy Awards, his name was mentioned in the In Memoriam section.

== Significant collaborations ==
=== With John Landis ===
Folsey Jr. edited or co-edited six Landis films: all productions from Schlock (1973) to The Blues Brothers (1980), Thriller and Coming to America. Folsey produced eleven films directed or co-directed by Landis (Schlock, The Blues Brothers, all films from An American Werewolf in London to Coming to America). He was also second unit director on Landis' Trading Places, Into the Night and Three Amigos projects. His son, editor Ryan Folsey appeared in Landis's first feature film Schlock. Folsey's name is mentioned in a scene in Trading Places when Louis Winthorpe gives his coat to the coat attendant and says "Good morning, Folsey."

== Selected filmography ==
Editor
Year	Film	Director	Notes
1972	Glass Houses	Alexander Singer	
1972	Bone	Larry Cohen	First collaboration with Larry Cohen
1972	Hammer	Bruce D. Clark	
1973	Black Caesar	Larry Cohen	Second collaboration with Larry Cohen
1973	Schlock	John Landis	First collaboration with John Landis
1973	Trader Horn	Reza Badiyi	
1975	Bucktown	Arthur Marks	First collaboration with Arthur Marks
1976	Tracks	Henry Jaglom	
1976	J. D.'s Revenge	Arthur Marks	Second collaboration with Arthur Marks
1976	Norman... Is That You?	George Schlatter	
1977	The Kentucky Fried Movie	John Landis	Second collaboration with John Landis
1977	The Chicken Chronicles	Frank Simon	
1978	Animal House	John Landis	Third collaboration with John Landis
1980	The Blues Brothers	John Landis	Fourth collaboration with John Landis
1981	Sourdough	Martin J. Spinelli	
1988	Coming to America	John Landis	Twelfth collaboration with John Landis
1996	Bulletproof	Ernest Dickerson	
1996	Entertaining Angels: The Dorothy Day Story	Michael Ray Rhodes	
1998	Dirty Work	Bob Saget	
1999	Goosed	Aleta Chappelle	
2003	Basic	John McTiernan	
2003	Cheaper by the Dozen	Shawn Levy	First collaboration with Shawn Levy
2004	The Kings of Brooklyn	Lance Lane	
2005	Hostel	Eli Roth	Second collaboration with Eli Roth
2005	The Ringer	Barry W. Blaustein	
2006	The Pink Panther	Shawn Levy	Second collaboration with Shawn Levy
2006	Unaccompanied Minors	Paul Feig	
2006	Pledge This!	William Heins; Strathford Hamilton	
2007	Hostel: Part II	Eli Roth	Third collaboration with Eli Roth
2007	The Gray Man	Scott Flynn	
2008	Sex Drive	Sean Anders	
2010	Hot Tub Time Machine	Steve Pink	
2012	Freeloaders	Dan Rosen	
2014	My Sister	David Lascher	
2014	Dead Within	Ben Wagner	
2015	Chain of Command	Kevin Carraway	
2015	Clarity	Peyv Raz	
2015	The Wicked Within	Jay Alaimo	
2021	Death Link	David Lipper	First collaboration with David Lipper
2021	Just Swipe	Elizabeth Blake-Thomas	
2022	Wolf Mountain	David Lipper	Second collaboration with David Lipper
2024	Summer Rain	Josiah David Warren	

Editorial department
Year	Film	Director	Role	Notes
1979	Portrait of a Hitman	Allan A. Buckhantz	Supervising editor	
1979	The Great Santini	Lewis John Carlino	Consulting editor	
2001	Super Troopers	Jay Chandrasekhar	Additional editor	First collaboration with Jay Chandrasekhar
2007	Love and Mary	Elizabeth Harrison	Supervising editor	
2008	Igor	Tony Leondis	Additional editor	

Actor
Year	Film	Director	Role	Notes
1983	Trading Places	John Landis	Extra	Uncredited

Additional crew
Year	Film	Director	Role
1972	Glass Houses	Alexander Singer	Camera operator

Cinematographer
Year	Film	Director
1972	Glass Houses	Alexander Singer

Producer
Year	Film	Director	Credit	Notes
1972	Glass Houses	Alexander Singer	Producer	
1973	Schlock	John Landis	Executive producer	
1980	The Blues Brothers	John Landis	Associate producer	
1981	An American Werewolf in London	John Landis	Producer	Fifth collaboration with John Landis
1983	Trading Places	John Landis	Executive producer	Sixth collaboration with John Landis
1983	Twilight Zone: The Movie	John Landis	Associate producer	Prologue / "Time Out" segment Seventh collaboration with John Landis
1985	Into the Night	John Landis	Producer	Eighth collaboration with John Landis
1985	Spies Like Us	John Landis	Producer	Ninth collaboration with John Landis
1985	Clue	Jonathan Lynn	Executive producer	First collaboration with Jonathan Lynn
1986	Three Amigos	John Landis	Producer	Tenth collaboration with John Landis
1987	Amazon Women on the Moon	Joe Dante; Carl Gottlieb; Peter Horton; John Landis; Robert K. Weiss	Executive producer	Eleventh collaboration with John Landis
1988	Coming to America	John Landis	Producer	
1993	The Thing Called Love	Peter Bogdanovich	Executive producer	
1994	Greedy	Jonathan Lynn	Executive producer	Second collaboration with Jonathan Lynn
1995	Grumpier Old Men	Howard Deutch	Co-producer	
2014	Dead Within	Ben Wagner	Producer	
2020	Reboot Camp	Ivo Raza	Executive producer	
2021	Death Link	David Lipper	Executive producer	

Second unit director or assistant director
Year	Film	Director	Role
1983	Trading Places	John Landis	Second unit director
1985	Into the Night	John Landis	Second unit director
1986	Three Amigos	John Landis	Second unit director

Thanks
Year	Film	Director	Role	Notes
2002	Cabin Fever	Eli Roth	Very special thanks	First collaboration with Eli Roth
2004	Club Dread	Jay Chandrasekhar	Thanks	Second collaboration with Jay Chandrasekhar
2008	The Rainbow Tribe	Christopher R. Watson	Very special thanks	
2011	Cellmates	Jesse Baget	Special thanks	

Direct-to-video films

Editor
Year	Film	Director
2006	Pledge This!	William Heins; Strathford Hamilton
2011	Hostel: Part III	Scott Spiegel

Documentaries

Editor
Year	Film	Director
1977	Exploring the Unknown	Alan Neuman

Editorial department
Year	Film	Director	Role
1970	Elvis: That's the Way It Is	Denis Sanders	Associate film editor

Thanks
Year	Film	Director	Role
2004	Edgar G. Ulmer: The Man Off-Screen	Michael Palm	Thanks

Shorts

Editor
Year	Film	Director
2007	Thanksgiving	Eli Roth
2007	Latchkey's Lament	Troy Nixey
2008	Hole in the Paper Sky	Bill Purple
2010	Despair	Alex Prager
2016	One World	Julien Seri

Editorial department
Year	Film	Director	Role
2000	The Right Hook	Luke Greenfield	Additional editor

Television films

Editor
Year	Film	Director
1977	It Happened at Lakewood Manor	Robert Scheerer
1979	Freedom Road	Ján Kadár

Television pilots

Producer
Year	Film	Director	Credit
2003	Fargo	Kathy Bates	Producer

Television series

Editor
Year	Title	Notes
1967	The Monkees	1 episode
1973−74	Shaft	4 episodes
1979	Freedom Road	2 episodes

Television shorts

Producer
Year	Film	Director	Credit
1971	Red, Red, Freckled	Leonid Nosyrev	Producer

Television specials

Editor
Year	Film	Director
1968	Here's Peggy Fleming	Robert Scheerer
2011	Wendy Liebman: Taller on TV	Wendy Liebman
