= Jennifer Lim (British actress) =

British-Singaporean actress

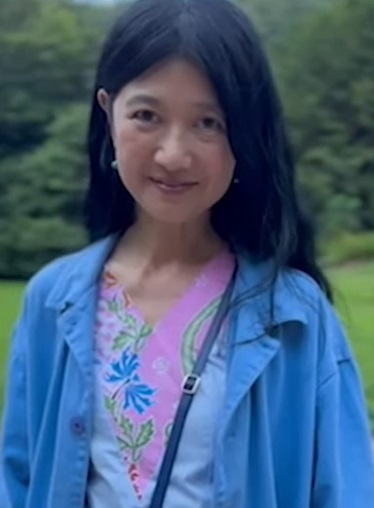
Jennifer Lim at Weekend of Hell GFCC 2024

Jennifer Lim is a Singaporean actress based in the United Kingdom.

== Life and career ==
Lim is known for her appearance as Samantha in the first television show made especially for mobile phones, called When Evil Calls directed by Johannes Roberts and for her role as Kana in the 2005 horror film Hostel.

In the short film, Isolation 9, written and directed by Jo Ho, Lim portrays Amy, a sick teenager. She is in hospital isolation, and develops a fragile relationship with a custodian. In 2015, she starred in Timo Rose's Sasquatch series Nature.

== Filmography ==
=== Film ===
Year	Title	Role	Notes
1999	Rogue Trader	Kim Wong	
2003	Code 46	Tester with couple	
2005	Pizza Girl	Betsy	
2005	Puritan	Rockstar's girlfriend	
2005	Hostel	Kana	
2006	Isolation 9	Amy	
2008	Act of Grace	Mui	
2009	Still		Short film
2010	Womb	Mrs. Muju	
2011	Night Lives	Ella	Short film - also director and producer
2011	Mercutio's Dreaming: The Killing of a Chinese Actor	-	Co-director and associate producer
2013	Faraway	Lin	
2013	Piercing Brightness	Shin	
2013	My Half Night with Him	Bee	Short film
2014	Beginner''s Guide to Live in the UK	Waitress	Video
2015	Dream of Emerald Hill	Kheng Lim	Short film - also producer
2016	A Monster Calls	Miss Kwan	
2016	Foot in Mouth	Anming	Short film
2018	Leviathan - Episode 05: Ismael	Ding Ling	Short film
2018	Leviathan: Jamila	Ding Ling	Short film
2019	Shallow Spring	Mother	Short film
2020	British People	Jane	Short film
2020	Red	Dr. Leung	Short film
2021	I'm Not in Love	Trinny	
2021	Bystander	Fiona	Short film
2022	Go Back Home!	British East Asian person	Short film
2024	The Monster Beneath Us	Ms. Hawthorn	In post-production

=== Television ===
Year	Title	Role	Notes
1995	Die Straßen von Berlin	Liang	Episode: "Dunkelrote Rosen"
2000	The League of Gentlemen	Lynne	Episode: "A Plague on Royston Vasey"
2001	World of Pub	Whispering customer #3	Episode: "Bookshop"
2006	When Evil Calls	Samantha	Miniseries - 2 episodes
2010	Spirit Warriors	May	Episode: "The Cave of Ghosts"
2014	The Sonnet Project		Episode: "Sonnet #101"
2017	Jade Dragon	Claudia	Web series - 4 episodes
2018	White Dragon	Hotel Concierge	Episode: "#1.7"
