= Raw Nerve (company) =

American film production company

- Company type: Private
- Industry: Film
- Genre: Horror
- Founded: 2004; 22 years ago
- Founders: Eli Roth, Scott Spiegel, Boaz Yakin
- Headquarters: Los Angeles, California

Raw Nerve was an American a film production company. The company was founded by Eli Roth, Scott Spiegel, and Boaz Yakin.

Raw Nerve produced 2001 Maniacs, Hostel, and Hostel: Part II.
