= Hostel (2005 film) =

Film by Eli Roth

- Theatrical release poster
- Directed by: Eli Roth
- Written by: Eli Roth
- Produced by: Mike Fleiss; Eli Roth; Chris Briggs
- Starring: Jay Hernandez; Derek Richardson; Eyþór Guðjónsson; Barbara Nedeljáková; Rick Hoffman
- Cinematography: Milan Chadima
- Edited by: George Folsey Jr.
- Music by: Nathan Barr
- Production companies: Next Entertainment; Raw Nerve
- Distributed by: Lions Gate Films (United States); Screen Gems (Worldwide; through Sony Pictures Releasing International); Falcon (Czech Republic)
- Release dates: 17 September 2005 (TIFF); 6 January 2006 (United States); 23 February 2006 (Czech Republic)
- Running time: 94 minutes
- Countries: United States; Czech Republic
- Language: English
- Budget: $4.8 million
- Box office: $82 million

Hostel is a 2005 horror film written and directed by Eli Roth and starring Jay Hernandez, Derek Richardson, Eyþór Guðjónsson, and Barbara Nedeljáková. It was produced by Mike Fleiss, Roth, and Chris Briggs, and executive produced by Boaz Yakin, Scott Spiegel, and Quentin Tarantino. The film follows a group of international tourists traveling in Slovakia, where they are eventually taken one-by-one by an organization that offers wealthy clients the opportunity to torture and kill others.

Hostel was released theatrically in the United States by Lions Gate Films on 6 January 2006, and in the Czech Republic by Falcon. The film received mixed reviews from critics, but grossed $82 million worldwide on a $4.8 million budget. It received some criticism from media in Slovakia and the Czech Republic for its portrayal of the countries as dangerous.

It successfully launched a film series, and was followed by Hostel: Part II (2007) and Hostel: Part III (2011). In 2024, a television series based on the film was reportedly in development with Roth's involvement.

== Plot ==
Two college students, Paxton Rodriguez and Josh Brooks, travel across Europe with their Icelandic friend, Óli Eriksson. In the Netherlands, they visit an Amsterdam nightclub, followed by a brothel. They are booted from the nightclub after getting in a fight with a clubgoer. Unable to get back into their hostel because of a curfew, they accept the offer of a man named Alexei to stay at his apartment. He convinces them that, instead of going to Barcelona, they should visit a hostel near Bratislava, Slovakia with beautiful women who fawn over Americans.

The three board a train to Slovakia, where they encounter a Dutch businessman who makes an inappropriate advance on Josh. Josh flips out, causing the businessman to leave. Arriving in Slovakia, they find that their roommates in the hostel are two women, Natalya and Svetlana. The women invite them to a spa, and later to a disco. Briefly exiting the disco, Josh is accosted by a gang of local Romani criminal children, but the Dutch businessman intervenes to defend him. Josh apologizes for his reaction on the train.

Paxton and Josh have sex with Natalya and Svetlana, while Óli leaves with the desk girl, Vala. The next morning, Óli does not return. The two are approached by a Japanese woman named Kana, who shows them a photo of Óli and her friend Yuki, who is also missing. Elsewhere, Óli is shown having been decapitated while Yuki is being tortured. Josh is anxious to leave, but Paxton convinces him to stay one more night with Natalya and Svetlana. They go to a disco, where both women slip the men mickies. Josh returns to the hostel and passes out on his bed, while Paxton stumbles into a pantry and is locked inside, where he passes out.

Josh wakes up in a dungeon-like room, handcuffed and shackled to a chair bolted to the floor, surrounded by weapons and instruments of torture. The Dutch businessman enters and begins maiming him with a drill, making holes in Josh's body, before slicing his achilles tendons and slitting his throat, while revealing that he paid for this service.

Paxton wakes up in the pantry in the disco when a worker opens the door and lets him out. He returns to the hostel, where he learns that Josh has supposedly checked out earlier that morning with Kana. He is greeted by Natalya and Svetlana who invite him to the spa, he declines. Determined to find his friend, Paxton files a police report, to no avail. Suspicious, he locates Natalya and Svetlana. Natalya takes Paxton to the Art Show, an old factory outside of town, where he sees Josh's mutilated corpse being stitched together by the Dutch businessman. Two men drag Paxton down a hallway, passing by several rooms where other people are being tortured. Paxton is restrained and prepped to be tortured by a German client named Johann. After begging for his life Paxton is gagged and Johann begins to threaten him with a chainsaw. Paxton begins to choke on his vomit and Johann removed the gag throwing it to the floor.

While cutting off two of Paxton's fingers with a chainsaw, Johann unintentionally severs his hand restraints. Johann slips on the ball gag and falls, accidentally severing his leg with the chainsaw. Paxton shoots Johann in the head with a gun. He then kills a guard, changes into business clothes, and finds a business card for the Elite Hunting Club, an organization that allows its wealthy clientele to pay to kill and mutilate tourists. Paxton also discovers Kana, whose face is being disfigured with a blowtorch by an American client. Paxton kills the man and rescues Kana and they flee in a stolen car, pursued by guards. Paxton discovers Natalya, Svetlana, and Alexei together and runs them over, killing the latter two, while the pursuing car finishes off Natalya. He also encounters the criminal Romani children from earlier and gives them a big pack of candy and gum. They then attack and kill the men pursuing Paxton with concrete blocks.

The two make it to the train station which is under surveillance from the Elite Hunting Club guards and cops on their payroll. Kana, seeing her disfigured face, kills herself by leaping in front of an oncoming train, which attracts attention and allows Paxton to board another train unnoticed. Aboard, Paxton hears the voice of the Dutch businessman. When the train stops in Vienna, Austria, Paxton follows the Dutch businessman into a public restroom and mutilates his fingers before slicing his throat. He then reboards the train and sits calmly.

== Cast ==
- Jay Hernandez as Paxton Rodriguez, an American tourist visiting Europe with his friend, Josh
- Derek Richardson as Josh Brooks, an American tourist visiting Europe with his friend, Paxton
- Eyþór Guðjónsson as Óli Eriksson, an Icelandic tourist joining Paxton and Josh
- Barbara Nedeljáková as Natalya, a Slovak woman with ties to the Elite Hunting Club
- Jennifer Lim as Kana, a Japanese tourist in Bratislava
- Jan Vlasák as the Dutch businessman, a former surgeon and client to the Elite Hunting Club
- Jana Kaderabkova as Svetlana, a Slovak woman with ties to the Elite Hunting Club
- Keiko Seiko as Yuki, a Japanese tourist and Kana's friend
- Lubomir Bukovy as Alexei, a Slovak man who told Paxton, Josh, and Óli of Bratislava and has ties to the Elite Hunting Club
- Jana Havlickova as Vala, the desk girl at the Hostel in Bratislava
- Rick Hoffman as the American client
- Petr Janiš as Johann, the German surgeon and client to the Elite Hunting Club
- Patrik Zigo as the Bubblegum Gang leader
- Milda Jedi Havlas as Jedi, the desk clerk at the Hostel in Bratislava
- Miroslav Táborský as the police officer
- Josef Bradna as the butcher

The movie also features three notable cameo appearances:

- Takashi Miike as an Elite Hunting Club client leaving the premises.
- Quentin Tarantino as a shirtless partier screaming out of a hotel window.
- Eli Roth (uncredited role) as an American tourist in a local coffee house.

== Production ==
=== Development ===
After the release of his directoral debut, Cabin Fever (2002), Eli Roth was met with praise from several industry figures, including Quentin Tarantino, who placed the film in his "Top 10" of the year and immediately reached out to Roth in hopes of working with him on a future project. Roth was offered many studio directing jobs, mostly in the form of horror remakes such as The Last House on the Left, The Fog, and a film in the Texas Chainsaw Massacre franchise, among several others, but Tarantino advised him to turn down those offers to instead create an original horror story. While swimming in Tarantino's pool, Roth brainstormed an idea for a low-budget horror film. The concept for the film came from a conversation between Roth and Ain't It Cool News founder Harry Knowles, in which the conversation eventually approached "the sickest thing [one] could find on the internet." Knowles then shared with Roth a Thai "murder vacation" website he came across on the dark web, where one could pay $10,000 to shoot someone dead. Knowles described the website as "the most disturbing thing I've ever seen." Roth had also met with Mike Fleiss and Chris Briggs after Cabin Fever to discuss future projects. Briggs stated "I want to make a movie called Hostel about backpackers, but I have no idea what it's about." Roth liked this, and developed a film around the idea. Upon hearing his pitch, Tarantino loved the idea and encouraged Roth to immediately start writing a draft that day, which later formed the basis for Hostel.

=== Casting ===
Jay Hernandez was cast as Paxton, with Roth praising his acting as "such a good actor that he feels like a regular guy." Roth had wanted actors "who felt like guys I went to college with, grew up with, people that I know..." and added that "The thing about Jay is he’s really like a real guy. He has that quality, that very natural style of acting. You don’t feel like he’s acting..." while also praising Hernandez's ability to act vulnerable. Jan Vlasák, a Czech actor with limited screen appearances known for his work in Shakespearean theater, was cast as the Dutch businessman. At a casting session in Prague, Slovak actress Barbara Nedeljáková read for the part of Vala, but Roth instead asked her to read for the part of Natalya.

The role of Óli Eriksson was written specifically for Eyþór Guðjónsson, whom Roth met while prepping for Cabin Fever in Iceland. Roth described Guðjónsson as "one of the funniest guys I had ever met. We went out, and he was insane, I had never met anyone like him, and I thought, "This guy has to be in a movie"...", while also highlighting his interest in putting an Icelandic character into a film given their lack of representation in cinema.

=== Filming ===
Principal photography took place in the Czech Republic, and many scenes were shot in Karlovy Vary and in Český Krumlov. The torture chamber scenes were filmed in the wing of a Prague hospital that had been abandoned since 1917. In the scene in which Paxton, Josh and Óli are driven by cab to the hostel, the actor playing the cab driver showed up to the set drunk, and had a stuntman double as him. The scene was instead rewritten to have the three keep the bags on their laps, as the actor could not load them into the cab's trunk.

== Music ==
The original music score was composed by Nathan Barr, who previously scored Cabin Fever, and commissioned the FILMharmonic Orchestra Prague to perform the score over a four-day period in October 2005. Also featured in the film's nightclub scene is the song "Some Kinda Freak" by Mephisto Odyssey. The song features the repeating hook, "everyone's some kinda freak...", an audio sample taken from the 1973 horror film Ganja & Hess directed by Bill Gunn. The film's soundtrack was released on 24 January 2006.

== Release ==
Hostel had its world premiere at the 2005 Toronto International Film Festival on 17 September 2005. The film was released in the United States on 6 January 2006, and in the Czech Republic on 23 February 2006.

=== Alternate ending ===
In the director's cut of the film, Paxton follows the Dutch businessman being accompanied by his young daughter into a public restroom of a train station. After finding her teddy bear in the women's restroom, the Dutch businessman frantically searches the crowd for his missing daughter. Paxton is then seen aboard the moving train with the Dutch businessman's daughter, whom he has kidnapped.

=== Home media ===
Sony Pictures Home Entertainment released Hostel on DVD in an unrated cut on 18 April 2006. A director's cut was released on DVD and Blu-ray the following year, on 23 October 2007.

On 13 October 2026, Scream Factory released the film in a twentieth anniversary set on 4K UHD Blu-ray alongside its sequel.

== Reception ==
=== Box office ===
Hostel earned $19.6 million in its first weekend in the United States, ranking number one at the box office. By the end of its run, six weeks later, the film grossed $47.3 million in the US box office and $33.3 million internationally for a worldwide total of $80.6 million.

The film is rated 18 by the British Board of Film Classification.

=== Critical response ===
Review aggregation website Rotten Tomatoes gives the film an approval rating of 60% based on 109 reviews and an average rating of 6.1/10. The site's critics consensus reads, "Featuring lots of guts and gore, Hostel is a wildly entertaining corpse-filled journey—assuming one is entertained by corpses, guts, and gore, that is." On Metacritic, the film had a weighted average score of 55 out of 100 based on 21 critics, indicating "mixed or average" reviews. Audiences polled by CinemaScore gave the film an average grade of "C−" on an A+ to F scale.

Film critic, Greg Falla, explored the movie is his collection of essays in Sado Mass Essayist: Certified Loverboy, Certified Cinephile. He specifically referred to the fallacy that Hostel is a Giallo, and coined the term "Cinematic Synecdoche" which he said is paramount in splatter or exploitative movies. The scene which is used to refer to the movie as a whole is usually a death scene which sticks with the audience. In Hostel, this is the blowtorch scene.

Entertainment Weekly's film critic Owen Gleiberman commended the film's creativity, saying "You may or may not believe that slavering redneck psychos, of the kind who leer through Rob Zombie's The Devil's Rejects, can be found in the Southwest, but it's all too easy to envision this sort of depravity in the former Soviet bloc, the crack-up of which has produced a brutal marketplace of capitalistic fiendishness. The torture scenes in Hostel (snipped toes, sliced ankles, pulled eyeballs) are not, in essence, much different from the surgical terrors in the Saw films, only Roth, by presenting his characters as victims of the same world of flesh-for-fantasy they were grooving on in the first place, digs deep into the nightmare of a society ruled by the profit of illicit desire." Jean-François Rauger, a film critic for Le Monde, a French newspaper, and programmer of the Cinémathèque Française, listed Hostel as the best American film of 2006, citing it as a commentary on modern consumerism.

The Guardian film critic Peter Bradshaw wrote that Hostel was "silly, crass and queasy. And not in a good way". David Edelstein of New York Magazine was equally negative, deriding director Roth with creating the horror subgenre "torture porn", or "gorno", using excessive violence to excite audiences like a sexual act.

=== Slovak reaction to setting ===
The film's release was accompanied by strong complaints from Slovakia and the Czech Republic. Slovak and Czech officials were both disgusted and outraged by the film's portrayal of their countries as undeveloped, poor, and uncultured lands suffering from high criminality, war, and prostitution, fearing it would "damage the good reputation of Slovakia" and make foreigners feel it was a dangerous place to be. The tourist board of Slovakia invited Roth on an all-expenses-paid trip to their country so he could see it is in fact not made up of run-down factories, ghettos, and kids who kill for bubble gum. Tomáš Galbavý, a Slovak Member of Parliament from the Slovak Democratic and Christian Union – Democratic Party, commented: "I am offended by this film. I think that all Slovaks should feel offended."

Defending himself, Roth said the film was not meant to be offensive, arguing, "Americans do not even know that this country exists. My film is not a geographical work but aims to show Americans' ignorance of the world around them." Roth argued that despite The Texas Chainsaw Massacre series, people still travel to Texas.

=== Themes and analysis ===
German film historian Florian Evers has pointed out the Holocaust imagery behind Hostel's horror iconography, connecting Roth's film to the Nazi exploitation genre.

=== Accolades ===
Award/association	Date held	Category	Recipient(s) and nominee(s)	Result	Ref.
Empire Awards	27 March 2007	Best Horror	Hostel	Won	
MTV Movie Awards	3 June 2006	Best Frightened Performance	Derek Richardson	Nominated	
Golden Schmoes Awards	2006	Best Horror Movie of the Year	Hostel	Nominated	
Golden Trailer Awards	1 June 2006	Best Horror	Hostel	Nominated	
Scream Awards	9 October 2006	Best Horror Movie	Hostel	Nominated	
Scream Awards	9 October 2006	Most Memorable Mutilation	The eye removal	Won	
Scream Awards	9 October 2006	The "Holy Sh!t"/"Jump-From-Your-Seat" Award	The eye removal	Won	
Scream Awards	9 October 2006	Best Screamplay	Eli Roth	Nominated	
Scream Awards	9 October 2006	Best Flesh Scene	Jay Hernandez; Jana Kaderabkova; Barbara Nedeljakova; Derek Richardson	Nominated	
Saturn Awards	10 May 2007	Best Horror Film	Hostel	Nominated	
Teen Choice Awards	20 August 2006	Choice Movie: Thriller	Hostel	Nominated	

== See also ==
- Extreme cinema

== Sources ==
- Evers, Florian (2011). Vexierbilder des Holocaust (in German). Münster, Germany: LIT Verlag. ISBN 978-3-643-11190-6. Archived from the original on 12 September 2023.
