= Hostel: Part III =

2011 film by Scott Spiegel

- DVD cover
- Directed by: Scott Spiegel
- Written by: Michael D. Weiss
- Based on: Characters by Eli Roth
- Produced by: Mike Fleiss; Chris Briggs; Scott Spiegel
- Starring: Kip Pardue; Brian Hallisay; John Hensley; Sarah Habel; Chris Coy; Skyler Stone; Thomas Kretschmann
- Cinematography: Andrew Strahorn
- Edited by: George Folsey Jr. Brad Wilhite
- Music by: Frederik Wiedmann
- Production companies: Stage 6 Films; RCR Media Group; Next Entertainment
- Distributed by: Sony Pictures Home Entertainment
- Release date: December 27, 2011
- Running time: 88 minutes
- Country: United States
- Language: English

Hostel: Part III is a 2011 American horror film directed by Scott Spiegel and the final installment in the Hostel film series. It was written by Michael D. Weiss. This is the only film in the series to not have Eli Roth involved in the production and is also the only one not to have a theatrical release. The film also relocates the Elite Hunting Club from Slovakia to Las Vegas.

The plot centers on four men attending a bachelor party in Las Vegas. While there, they are enticed by two prostitutes to join them at a private party way off the Strip. Once there, they are horrified to find themselves the subjects of a perverse game of torture, where members of the Elite Hunting Club are hosting the most sadistic show in town. It was released direct-to-DVD on December 27, 2011.

== Plot ==
A young man named Travis goes into a room at a hostel in Las Vegas where a Ukrainian couple, Victor and Anka, are currently staying. Anka and Victor fall unconscious after being drugged by the beer Travis gave them and are swept up by a cleanup crew, and it is revealed that Travis is an enforcer of the Elite Hunting Club. Victor later wakes up in a cell in an abandoned building and watches as two guards drag Anka out of her cell.

A man named Scott leaves his fiancée Amy to go to Las Vegas to attend his own bachelor party with his friend Carter, Amy's former flame. There, they meet up with their other friends, Mike and Justin. The four go to a nightclub, where they meet Kendra and Nikki, two escorts Carter secretly paid to have sex with Scott. Kendra and Nikki tell the four men about a "freaky" party they could go to on the other end of town, and the four men take a cab to an abandoned building. At the party, Kendra makes a move on Scott, but he declines and tells her about how he previously cheated on Amy and almost lost her, and does not want it to happen again. Scott wakes up the next morning in his hotel room with Carter and Justin. The three wonder where Mike is, as he is not answering his phone.

Mike wakes in a cell next to Victor and starts panicking. Two guards take him to a glass room torture chamber in front of a live audience and strap him to a chair, and Mike is on display to be gambled upon by wealthy clients. A middle-aged client dressed as a doctor enters the room; Mike pleads with him, but the man cuts and peels Mike's face off before killing him. Worried about Mike's whereabouts, Scott, Carter, and Justin travel to Nikki's trailer, but cannot find her. Kendra arrives and reveals that Nikki is missing as well. Meanwhile at the Las Vegas Art Show, Nikki is brought into the same room as Mike and strapped to a table dressed as a cheerleader. Another man who speaks in Hungarian enters the room and releases a jar full of cockroaches onto Nikki, some of which crawl into her mouth and asphyxiate her to death.

Scott, Carter, Justin, and Kendra get a text from Mike's phone, sent by Travis, to meet him and Nikki in a hotel room. When they get there, everyone is kidnapped by Travis and wakes up in individual cells along with Victor. The two guards take Justin away, and Carter calls the guard and informs them that he is also a client. After he shows his Elite Hunting Club tattoo, the guards let him go. Scott, Justin, and Kendra are confused as to what happened and Carter revealed it was a members only franchise.

Justin is later strapped into a chair and Carter, Flemming, and Travis watch as a woman dressed as a Japanese cyberpunk ninja fatally shoots him with multiple crossbow bolts. The main event starts and Scott is strapped into a chair dressed in a tuxedo. He asks Carter why he is doing this, and Carter reveals he wanted Amy for himself, as they were in a relationship before she ended up with Scott. He says he was disappointed that Amy stayed with Scott after Carter told her about Scott's infidelity. Carter adds that Mike and Justin weren't intended to die, but is fine with their deaths. He says that once Scott dies, he will comfort Amy and she will want to be with him.

Flemming then orders Scott to be released from the chair, and Scott and Carter wind up fighting. Scott ends up stabbing Carter, cuts off Carter's tattoo, and then escapes by using Carter's tattoo on the scanners. Victor kills one of the guards and escapes his cage, but is killed by another guard. Scott manages to call the cops and frees Kendra, who is shot dead by Travis. Upon learning that the police have been contacted, Flemming has no other choice but to do away with the Las Vegas Art Show. He orders for all of the prisoners to be killed and the clientele to be evacuated. Scott and Travis fight and Scott kills Travis. Flemming has rigged the building to explode and attempts to drive away, but Carter kills him as payback for ruining his plan to kill Scott and steals his car. Carter sees Scott and locks the front gate before Scott can get to him. He then quickly drives off while the building explodes, with Scott still inside the gates.

Sometime later, Carter is comforting Amy in her home about Scott's apparent death. After he opens a bottle of wine for them, Amy then reveals that Scott is still alive and pins Carter's hand to a chair with a corkscrew. A burned Scott drags Carter into the garage and the pair strap him to a chair, where Scott kills him with a lightweight gas-powered tiller.

== Cast ==
- Kip Pardue as Carter
- Brian Hallisay as Scott
- John Hensley as Justin
- Sarah Habel as Kendra
- Skyler Stone as Mike
- Zulay Henao as Nikki
- Thomas Kretschmann as Flemming
- Chris Coy as Travis
- Nickola Shreli as Victor
- Evelina Oboza as Anka
- Kelly Thiebaud as Amy
- Derrick Carr as Mossberg
- Frank Alvarez as Mesa
- Tim Holmes as Beardo
- Barry Livingston as a doctor
- Alicia Vela-Bailey as Japanese cyberpunk woman

== Production ==
=== Development and writing ===
In May 2007 Eli Roth, who wrote and directed the first two films, said that there would be no third film in the franchise. Roth stated: "I hate a lame third sequel, and I don't want there to be one. ... I wish Beyond Thunderdome didn't exist; I wish there was just Mad Max and The Road Warrior. I really wasn't crazy about Spider-Man 3. I wanted it after Spider-Man 1 and Spider-Man 2, but with Spider-Man 3 I was really disappointed when I saw that film; that will never happen with Hostel." In 2009 a third film was announced with Roth confirming that he would have no involvement in it, though he gave the studio his blessing to continue the series without him. Sony’s Stage 6 Films later hired writer Michael D. Weiss to craft a U.S.‑set script that relocated the Elite Hunting Club to Las Vegas; director Scott Spiegel, already a producer on the first two entries, came aboard after pitching additional twists such as the “Wheel of Misfortune” gambling device. A teaser released the following October confirmed the Vegas storyline and the film’s direct‑to‑video release strategy.

=== Financing and incentives ===
Spiegel secured a modest budget from Stage 6 and RCR Media, then steered the production to Michigan to leverage the state’s 42 percent film‑tax rebate, calling the incentive “the difference between making the movie and not.” The Michigan Film Office later listed Hostel Part III among the 160 projects shot in Detroit during the rebate era.

=== Casting ===
Spiegel described the ensemble as “faces you believe would really hit Vegas for a bachelor weekend,” noting that television regulars Brian Hallisay and John Hensley were cast to ground the film while genre veterans Thomas Kretschmann and Kip Pardue provided marquee value. Spiegel later explained that the franchise’s premise “can take place anywhere in the world,” which helped justify moving the narrative to an American cast and setting.

=== Design and practical effects ===
Returning production designer Robb Wilson King transformed Detroit’s neo‑gothic Masonic Temple into casino interiors, underground cells and a high‑tech betting floor for the Elite Hunting Club. Special make‑up effects were overseen by Robert Kurtzman, who emphasised more psychological tension and “a bit less skinning” than the previous films because of the tighter budget.

=== Filming ===
Principal photography ran for 20 days in late 2010 without a second‑unit crew, splitting time between Detroit interiors and a short four‑day pickup block on the Las Vegas Strip. Spiegel and cinematographer Andrew Strahorn shot on Super 16 film stock rather than the Red digital cameras common to direct‑to‑video horror, aiming for a “grittier” texture that evoked the first two entries. The DVD commentary track with Spiegel and star Kip Pardue reveals that night shoots routinely ran from 11 p.m. to noon the next day to maximise the Masonic Temple’s availability.

=== Post‑production ===
Editing and visual‑effects work were completed at Sony Pictures’ Culver City lot, where Spiegel supervised the expansion of the Wheel of Misfortune sequence described in the screenplay.

== Release ==
Hostel: Part III was released on DVD and video on demand on December 27, 2011, in the United States, and on January 18, 2012, in Europe.

== Reception ==
On the review aggregator website Rotten Tomatoes, 57% of seven critics' reviews are positive, with an average rating of 5.8/10.
