= Hostel: Part II =

2007 film by Eli Roth

- Theatrical release poster
- Directed by: Eli Roth
- Written by: Eli Roth
- Based on: Characters by Eli Roth
- Produced by: Mike Fleiss; Eli Roth; Chris Briggs
- Starring: Lauren German; Roger Bart; Heather Matarazzo; Bijou Phillips; Richard Burgi
- Cinematography: Milan Chadima
- Edited by: George Folsey Jr.
- Music by: Nathan Barr
- Production companies: Next Entertainment; Raw Nerve
- Distributed by: Lionsgate (United States); Screen Gems (Worldwide; through Sony Pictures Releasing)
- Release date: June 8, 2007
- Running time: 94 minutes
- Country: United States
- Languages: English; Slovak
- Budget: $10.2 million
- Box office: $35.6 million

Hostel: Part II is a 2007 American horror film written and directed by Eli Roth, serving as a sequel to Hostel (2005). The film stars Lauren German, Roger Bart, Heather Matarazzo, Bijou Phillips, and Richard Burgi. It was produced by Mike Fleiss, Roth, and Chris Briggs, with Boaz Yakin, Scott Spiegel, and Quentin Tarantino serving as executive producers. The plot follows three American female art students in Rome who are directed to a Slovak village where they are eventually kidnapped and taken to a facility in which rich clients pay to torture and kill other people.

After the significant box office receipts of Hostel, Roth conceived a sequel set directly after the events of the first film, opting to include three female protagonists to "up the ante." Filming took place in September 2006 in Prague at Barrandov Studios, with additional photography occurring in Iceland and Slovakia.

Banned from theatrical release in several countries, Hostel: Part II had its world premiere at the Museum of the Moving Image in New York City on June 6, 2007, and was released theatrically in the United States two days later, on June 8. The film earned less than its predecessor at the box office, grossing $17 million in the United States by the end of its theatrical run, whereas the original made $19 million in its opening weekend alone. Prior to its theatrical release, a workprint of the film leaked on the Internet, and one publication at the time claimed it was the "most pirated film ever", which Roth suggested was a factor in the film's box office returns.

== Plot ==
Following his escape from the Elite Hunting Club, (Note: As depicted in Hostel) Paxton has PTSD and lives in seclusion with his girlfriend, Stephanie. After an argument where Stephanie denounces Paxton's paranoia as exaggerated and "insufferable", she wakes to find his headless corpse in their kitchen. Soon after, an unmarked box containing Paxton's severed head is delivered to the Elite Hunting Club's boss, Sasha Rassimov.

In Rome, three American art students, Beth, Whitney, and Lorna, are convinced by Axelle, a nude model they are sketching, to join her on a luxurious spa vacation in Slovakia. During a train ride, Beth is accosted by a passenger while Lorna gets her iPod stolen, which Axelle recovers. The four check into a hostel, where the desk clerk surreptitiously uploads their passport photos to an auction website run by the Elite Hunting Club. American businessman Todd and his best friend Stuart win the bids on Whitney and Beth, and excitedly travel to Slovakia.

Later that night, at the village's harvest festival, Lorna is invited by Roman, a Slovak local, to join him on a boat ride. After being taken to a secluded area downstream, Lorna is kidnapped, and awakens to find herself having been stripped naked, bound, gagged, and hanging upside down. Another woman, Mrs. Bathory, enters the room, disrobes, and lies naked beneath Lorna, before using a long scythe to repeatedly slash Lorna's back, torso, and eventually her throat, all while bathing in her dripping blood. Meanwhile, Beth, Whitney, Axelle, and a local man, Miroslav, head to a spa to relax. Beth falls asleep, and wakes up alone and without her belongings. While looking for her friends, she is pursued by several men and flees the spa. In the woods, she is ambushed by a gang of violent street Romani children, but is saved by Sasha and Axelle; after both ladies leave, Sasha kills one of the boys as punishment.

Later, at Sasha's remote mansion, Beth is pursued by the men from earlier, whom she realizes are associated with Sasha and Axelle. Looking for a hiding place, she discovers a room filled with human trophy heads (one of which is Paxton's) before being captured, taken to the Art Show, where security has been upgraded in the time since the previous film, and tied up in a room. Beth is soon joined by Stuart, who is supposed to kill her, yet appears reluctant to do so. However, he knocks her unconscious after untying her.

Whitney attempts to escape after biting off the makeup artist's nose but is recaptured. In another room, Todd terrorizes Whitney with a power saw, but loses his nerve after accidentally wounding her. Horrified, Todd tries to leave, but is told that he must kill Whitney before leaving as stated in the contract. Todd refuses and tries to leave anyway, and the guards release attack dogs, which tear him apart. The Elite Hunting Club then offer the maimed Whitney to the other clients to kill, including an elderly Italian man who is eating Miroslav alive. Stuart, after learning of Todd's death but unaware of the circumstances, shows Beth the pictures of the maimed Whitney to frighten her, then accepts the club's offer, leaves Beth, and beheads Whitney.

Having made up his mind, Stuart prepares to torture and kill Beth, speaking to her as if she is his wife. Beth is able to seduce him into untying her from the chair. Stuart tells her to get on the floor and attempts to rape her, but she fights him off and chains him to the chair. Sasha and the guards arrive at her cell, where Beth offers to buy her freedom with part of her inheritance. Stuart tries to outbid her, but Sasha says he knows that Stuart cannot afford to do so as Todd paid for them. After Sasha tells Beth that she must kill someone before leaving, Stuart verbally accosts her and she cuts off Stuart's genitalia and leaves him to bleed to death, an act that gives pause to even the jaded guards. Satisfied, Sasha gives Beth an Elite Hunting tattoo.

That night, Axelle is lured by the street Romani children into the woods, where Beth ambushes and beheads her. The children start playing football with Axelle's severed head.

== Cast ==
- Lauren German as Beth Salinger
- Roger Bart as Stuart
- Heather Matarazzo as Lorna Weisenfreund
- Bijou Phillips as Whitney Swerling
- Richard Burgi as Todd
- Vera Jordanova as Axelle
- Milan Kňažko as Sasha Rassimov
- Zuzana Geislerová as Inya
- Stanislav Ianevski as Miroslav
- Jay Hernandez as Paxton Rodriguez
- Jordan Ladd as Stephanie
- Milda Havlas as Jedi, Desk Clerk
- Roman Janecka as Roman
- Monika Malacova as Mrs. Bathory
- Patrick Zigo as Bubblegum Gang Leader
- Luc Merenda as Italian Detective
- Edwige Fenech as Art Class Professor
- Ivan Furak as Big Guard
- Lillian Malkina as Make-Up Woman
- Ruggero Deodato as Italian Cannibal

== Production ==
=== Casting ===
Roth sought Lauren German for the lead role based on her performance in The Texas Chainsaw Massacre (2003). "Lauren has a sense of humor, but she can also handle those horrific, intense moments," explained Roth. "I needed an actress who would be so vulnerable and so likeable but then really strong when she needs to be. Even though Lauren probably weighs ninety pounds soaking wet and looks like a princess, you feel like she's kicking ass." Bijou Phillips was cast as Whitney after impressing Roth with her audition. For the part of Lorna, Roth had Heather Matarazzo in mind from the beginning; she flew to Los Angeles to read for the part, unaware that Roth was meeting to offer it to her.

Vera Jordanova was cast as Axelle, a female antagonist, while former Slovak Minister of Culture and actor Milan Kňažko was given the role of Sasha, the Russian mafia member and ringleader of the torture factory. "The fact that Sasha was Russian was one of the reasons I accepted this role," Kňažko joked. "We Slovaks are still a little bit angry over the occupation of Czechoslovakia by the Soviet army." To play Stuart and Todd, the American businessmen who are "emblematic of the more extreme sides of human nature and the dark shadow of First World materialism," Roth cast Roger Bart and Richard Burgi.

Jared Harris was also sought for a role on the film by Eli Roth, who wanted to meet with Harris to discuss the potential role. However, upon watching the first film to familiarize himself with the franchise, Harris found himself unnerved by the depravity of the subject matter and declined further involvement.

=== Filming ===
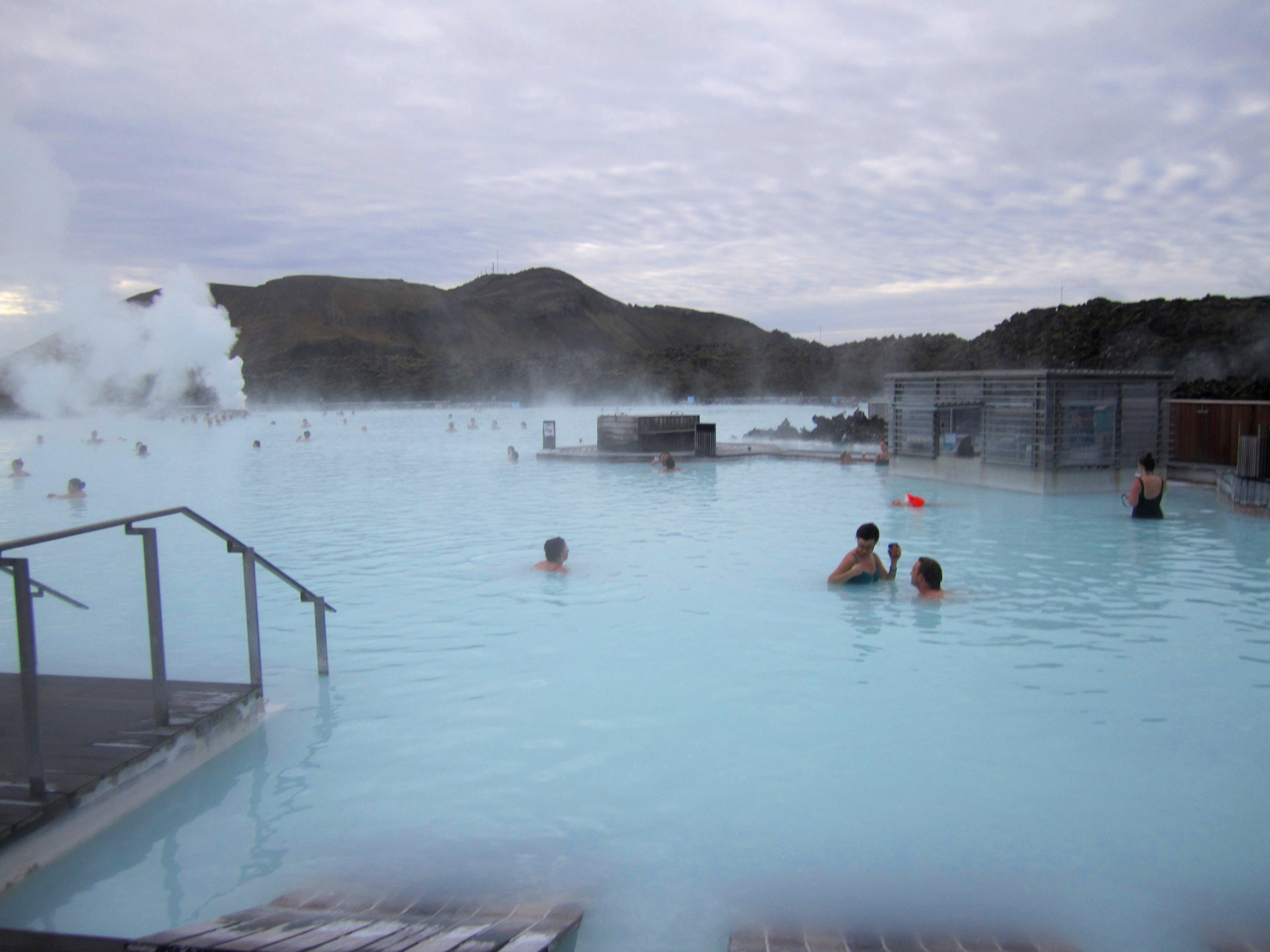
A major sequence in the film was shot at the Blue Lagoon spa in Iceland.

Principal photography began on September 11, 2006, in Prague's Barrandov Studios. Much of the tunnel sequences in the torture factory were filmed in sets constructed at the studio, while additional photography took place in and around Prague. The unnamed village where the protagonists stay and attend the harvest festival is Český Krumlov, located in the Czech Republic's South Bohemian Region. The brick-and-mortar exteriors of the factory were constructed by production designer Robert Wilson King, and based on real abandoned factories he and Roth had toured abroad. Roth shot scenes for the film in the brothel Big Sister, and the spa sequence was shot on location at the Blue Lagoon near Reykjavík in Iceland.

I don't think I could do something like this again. I'm glad that I had the experience, and I love my job, but we went into places that I didn't know existed, and I don't need to do that again.

— Bijou Phillips, on performing her torture scene in the film

The special effects in the film were created by Greg Nicotero and Howard Berger, who had worked with Roth on the previous film. Actress Phillips claimed that her torture sequence, which entails her being scalped by a power saw, required around forty-five setups. "I don't think I could do something like this again", she stated in a 2007 interview. "I'm glad that I had the experience, and I love my job, but we went into places that I didn't know existed, and I don't need to do that again." Matarazzo's elaborate murder sequence required the actress to hang upside down, nude, with her hands chained to her back. Matarazzo performed the scene herself, and was hung upside down in five-minute intervals over a period of two days.

== Release ==
=== Marketing and press ===
Original one sheet teaser poster, which was removed from theaters.

Lionsgate devised several one sheet posters for the film in late 2006 and early 2007, the first of which consisted merely of a closeup of what appeared to be torn flesh. This poster, released in December 2006, yielded complaints from American theater patrons, and it was removed from theaters. The poster was conceived by Lionsgate marketing executive Tim Palen, and was a close-up picture of boar meat; it was only approved by the Motion Picture Association of America when Palen showed them the butcher shop receipts for the meat.

A second poster, released in February 2007, showed a side profile of actress Bijou Phillips nude, holding her own severed head. The two posters were subsequently combined, with the image of Phillips superimposed over the first poster. A third poster, showing Matarazzo hanging upside down, was also released. On May 11, 2007, the final one sheet was released, which showed Roger Bart standing in a darkened corridor, holding a power drill in front of his groin.

To promote the film's upcoming release, Lionsgate screened the first five minutes of Hostel: Part II before select screenings of Bug, which opened on May 25, 2007. On June 6, 2007, the film was given an advance screening at the Museum of the Moving Image, and featured a Q&A session with Roth afterward.

=== Censorship ===
The film has been restricted to adults in most countries.

However, it has been cut in Germany, and the "German Extended Version" (in which Lorna's torture and death scene is still not shown completely) has subsequently been banned in Germany. A court in Munich ruled the uncut release of the film to be punishable by law. The ban was lifted in 2022 but the movie remains on the List of Media Harmful to Young People restricting the access to adults only.

The film was banned outright in New Zealand upon submission to the ratings board, after the distributor refused to make cuts in order to receive an R18 certificate. However, it would later receive a release in edited form in New Zealand on DVD in 2008.

On October 8, 2007, the film was cited in the House of Commons of the United Kingdom as an example where stills from the film could be illegal to possess under the proposed law to criminalise possession of "extreme pornography". MP Charles Walker claimed that although he had never seen the film, he was "assured by trusted sources" that "from beginning to end it depicts obscene, misogynistic acts of brutality against women." The British Board of Film Classification passed the film uncut with an 18 certificate.

Censorship of the film received some backlash from the public: Writer and attorney Julie Hilden defended the film, both critically and artistically, in her essay "Why are critics so hostile to Hostel: Part II?", published after the film's theatrical release. In it, Hilden wrote, "Many of the visceral depictions of violence in these [types of] movies conveyed strong messages that no viewer could miss. Ironically, these messages, especially in the Hostel films, are typically anti-violence."

== Reception ==
=== Box office ===
Hostel: Part II was released in Australia June 7, 2007. It was released in the United States the following day, June 8, where it opened at number 6 at the box office, and earning $8.2 million during its opening weekend on 2,350 screens, averaging $3,490 per theater. The film grossed a total of $17.6 million domestically. It was released four weeks later in the United Kingdom on June 29. Internationally, the film grossed $18 million, making for a total worldwide gross of $35.6 million.

The film grossed less than half of what its predecessor did, released during a period the Los Angeles Times characterized as a "slump" for horror films. Comparatively, the original opened at #1 with $19 million ($2 million more than Hostel: Part II's final gross) and went on to make over $47 million.

Leading up to the film's June 8 release in the United States, pirated DVD copies of a rough cut of the film surfaced among street vendors. Director Eli Roth blamed the piracy for the film's lower-than-anticipated box office results. In a 2007 article, the New Zealand publication Newshub stated that Hostel: Part II was the most-pirated film of all time, having been illegally downloaded on the Internet by millions of users.

=== Critical response ===
Review aggregator website Rotten Tomatoes reports an approval rating of 44% based on 113 reviews, with an average rating of 5.1/10. The site's critics consensus reads: "Offering up more of the familiar sadism and gore, Hostel: Part II will surely thrill horror fans." On Metacritic, the film had a weighted average score of 46 out of 100 based on 21 critics, indicating "mixed or average" reviews. Audiences polled by CinemaScore gave the film an average grade of "C" on an A+ to F scale.

Several critics compared the film's production value and plot positively to its predecessor. In The Hollywood Reporter, Michael Rechtshaffen said the film was "a step up in virtually every aspect, from production values to its better focused storytelling and more fully developed characters." Similarly, Total Film described the film as a "superior beast" compared to the first film, with a "stupefying" technical advancement, a "satisfying" plot, and main characters who are "fun to hook up with." Elizabeth Weitzman of the New York Daily News also thought the film was "smarter and tougher than its predecessor."

Some film critics believed the film commented on wider geopolitical themes. Anthony Quinn, writing for The Independent, speculated that the film may offer a "subversive" commentary on American values. Owen Gleiberman of Entertainment Weekly believed the businessman ethos and auction-style bidding process in the film is similar to the real-life practices of the sex trafficking industry. In a retrospective assessment of the film in 2017, Mike Thorn of The Film Stage praised Hostel: Part II, citing perceived geopolitical undercurrents and its doubled narrative perspective as primary reasons: "By extending its narrative reach to include the Hostel "clients" as well as its prisoners, Part II deepens its moral and political insights. The audience is asked not only to empathize with the victims, but also to recognize its own complicity as spectators." By contrast, Nathan Lee of The Village Voice believed the film was "too goofy to disturb, too silly to scare" and described critics who saw a deeper meaning in the film as "bamboozled pseudo-intellectuals."

Criticism of the film focused on how similar it was to its predecessor, as well as its lack of depth. In The Guardian, Phelim O'Neill awarded it three stars out of five but wrote that the film was "virtually identical to the first outing" and that "everything, save the bloody third act, is handled in a rudimentary fashion." Jamie Russell of the BBC gave it the same rating but wrote that the plot similarity to the first film "elicits déjà vu" and that "Eli Roth returns with more bucks but less imagination. Laura Kern of The New York Times described the main characters of the film as "fractionally more tolerable than the moronic frat boys of Part 1" and wrote that Roth had "mastered the cheap sadism-as-entertainment gross-out." Mark Kermode of The Observer wrote, "Eli Roth should be slapped and sent to bed with no supper until he promises to stop squandering the promise of Cabin Fever on infantile tripe like this. Sadly, his ongoing association with Quentin Tarantino, who once again 'presents' this drivel, merely brings out his worst, arrested-adolescent fanboy tendencies."

In Leonard Maltin's annual publication rating movies, the film is given a BOMB rating, commenting, "Dreary, to say the least."

== Accolades ==
The film was nominated for two Golden Raspberry Awards in the field of "Worst Excuse for a Horror Movie" and "Worst Prequel or Sequel", but lost both to I Know Who Killed Me and Daddy Day Camp, respectively. Heather Matarazzo was nominated for Best Supporting Actress at the 2007 Fright Meter Awards.

== Sequel ==
In June 2008, it was announced that Scott Spiegel, one of the executive producers of both Hostel and Hostel: Part II, was in talks to write and direct a third film in the series. In July 2009, Eli Roth confirmed that he would not be directing Hostel: Part III. Unlike the previous installments, the film takes place in the United States, in Las Vegas, Nevada. Hostel: Part III was released directly to DVD on December 27, 2011 in the United States.
