= List of Columbia Pictures films (2000–2009) =

The following is a list of films produced and/or released by Columbia Pictures in 2000–2009. Most films listed here were distributed theatrically in the United States by the company's distribution division, Sony Pictures Releasing (formerly known as Triumph Releasing Corporation (1982–1994) and Columbia TriStar Film Distributors International (1991–2005)). It is one of the Big Five film studios. Columbia Pictures is a subsidiary of Japanese conglomerate Sony.

== 2000 ==
Release date	Title	Notes
February 18, 2000	Hanging Up	co-production with Laurence Mark Productions
February 18, 2000	Not One Less	international distribution outside China and Hong Kong only; co-production with Guangxi Film and Beijing New Picture; distributed in North America by Sony Pictures Classics
March 3, 2000	What Planet Are You From?	co-production with Brillstein-Grey Entertainment
March 17, 2000	Erin Brockovich	Nominee for the Academy Award for Best Picture; Nominee of the Golden Globe Award for Best Motion Picture – Drama international distribution only; co-production with Universal Pictures and Jersey Films
March 24, 2000	Whatever It Takes (Note: Co-owned by Content Partners, LLC)	distribution outside Japan only; produced by Phoenix Pictures
April 14, 2000	28 Days	co-production with Tall Trees Productions
May 5, 2000	I Dreamed of Africa	co-production with Jaffilms
May 12, 2000	Center Stage	co-production with Laurence Mark Productions
June 2, 2000	Running Free	co-production with Moonlighting Films
June 30, 2000	The Patriot	co-production with Mutual Film Company and Centropolis Entertainment
July 21, 2000	Loser	co-production with Branti Film Productions and Cockamamie Films
August 4, 2000	Hollow Man	co-production with Red Wagon Entertainment
September 8, 2000	Anatomy	German film; co-production with Claussen + Wöbke Filmproduktion
September 15, 2000	Almost Famous	international distribution only; produced by DreamWorks Pictures and Vinyl Films
September 15, 2000	Circus	co-production with Circus Pictures and Film Development Corporation
September 22, 2000	Urban Legends: Final Cut	distribution outside Japan only; produced by Phoenix Pictures and Original Film
November 3, 2000	Charlie's Angels	co-production with Flower Films and Tall Trees Productions
November 17, 2000	The 6th Day	distribution outside Japan only; produced by Phoenix Pictures
December 6, 2000	Snatch	international distribution only; produced by SKA Films; distributed in North America by Screen Gems
December 8, 2000	Crouching Tiger, Hidden Dragon	distribution in Brazil, Australia, New Zealand, Eastern Europe, Greece, Cyprus, Turkey and Asia excluding China only; distributed in North and Hispanic America, the U.K. and Ireland by Sony Pictures Classics
December 8, 2000	Vertical Limit	co-production with Martin Campbell Productions
December 19, 2000	Finding Forrester	co-production with Laurence Mark Productions and Fountainbridge Films
December 25, 2000	All the Pretty Horses	distribution outside the U.S. theatrically and on television only; co-production with Miramax Films
December 25, 2000	An Everlasting Piece	international distribution only; co-production with DreamWorks Pictures, Bayahibe Films and Baltimore Spring/Creek Pictures

== 2001 ==
Release Date	Title	Notes
January 26, 2001	The Wedding Planner (Note: Sony has since also acquired distribution rights to this film for the world excluding the U.K. and Ireland through a licensing deal struck with Resurgence Media Group in October 2025)	North American distribution and German and Austrian home media distribution only; produced by Intermedia Films, Tapestry Films, Dee Gee Entertainment and Prufrock Pictures
February 1, 2001	Hostile Takeover	German film; distribution only; produced by MPS Mediaproductions
February 9, 2001	Saving Silverman (Note: Co-owned by Alcon Entertainment)	distribution outside Australia, New Zealand and Singapore only; co-production with Village Roadshow Pictures, NPV Entertainment and Original Film
March 30, 2001	The Tailor of Panama	co-production with Merlin Films
March 30, 2001	Tomcats (Note: Sony now owns worldwide rights to this film through a licensing deal struck with Revolution Studios in October 2019)	distribution outside the U.S. on television and VOD, Germany, Austria, Switzerland, Scandinavia, Portugal, Israel and Japan only; produced by Revolution Studios and Eagle Cove Entertainment
April 11, 2001	Joe Dirt	co-production with Happy Madison Productions and Robert Simonds Productions
April 12, 2001	Advertising Rules!	German film; co-production with Von Vietinghoff Filmproduktion
May 4, 2001	Time and Tide	international distribution only; co-production with Film Workshop Co. Ltd.
May 11, 2001	A Knight's Tale	co-production with Escape Artists and Finestkind Productions
May 25, 2001	The Road Home	international distribution outside China and Hong Kong only; produced by Beijing New Picture Distribution Company; distributed in North America by Sony Pictures Classics
June 1, 2001	The Animal	distribution outside the U.S. on television and VOD, Germany, Austria, Switzerland, Italy, Scandinavia, Portugal, Israel and Japan only; produced by Revolution Studios and Happy Madison Productions
June 8, 2001	Evolution	international distribution only; co-production with DreamWorks Pictures and the Montecito Picture Company
June 27, 2001	Baby Boy	co-production with New Deal Productions
July 11, 2001	Final Fantasy: The Spirits Within	distribution outside Japan only; produced by Square Pictures
July 20, 2001	America's Sweethearts	distribution outside the U.S. on television and VOD, Germany, Austria, Switzerland, Italy, Scandinavia, Portugal, Israel and Japan only; produced by Revolution Studios, Face Productions, Roth-Arnold Productions and Shoelace Productions
September 14, 2001	The Glass House	co-production with Original Film
September 21, 2001	Glitter	distribution outside North America theatrically and on television only; co-production with 20th Century Fox, Maroon Entertainment and Laurence Mark Productions
October 19, 2001	Riding in Cars with Boys	co-production with Gracie Films
October 26, 2001	Thirteen Ghosts	remake of 1960 film; international distribution only; co-production with Warner Bros. Pictures and Dark Castle Entertainment
November 2, 2001	The One	distribution outside the U.S. on television and VOD, Germany, Austria, Switzerland, Italy, Scandinavia, Portugal, Israel and Japan only; produced by Revolution Studios and Hard Eight Pictures
December 14, 2001	Not Another Teen Movie	co-production with Original Film
December 25, 2001	Ali	North American distribution only; co-production with Peters Entertainment, Forward Pass, Picture Entertainment and Overbrook Films
December 28, 2001	Black Hawk Down	distribution outside the U.S. on television and VOD, Germany, Austria, Switzerland, Scandinavia, Portugal, Israel and Japan only; produced by Revolution Studios, Jerry Bruckheimer Films and Scott Free Productions

== 2002 ==
Release Date	Title	Notes
February 8, 2002	Rollerball	international distribution outside Germany, Austria, Italy and Japan only; produced by Metro-Goldwyn-Mayer and Mosaic Media Group
March 29, 2002	Panic Room	co-production with Hofflund/Polone Productions and Indelible Pictures
April 12, 2002	The Sweetest Thing	co-production with Konrad Pictures
May 3, 2002	Spider-Man	co-production with Marvel Enterprises and Laura Ziskin Productions
May 10, 2002	The New Guy	distribution outside the U.S. on television and VOD, Germany, Austria, Scandinavia, Portugal, Israel and Japan only; produced by Revolution Studios
May 24, 2002	Enough	co-production with Winkler Films
June 28, 2002	Mr. Deeds	remake of the 1936 film Mr. Deeds Goes to Town; co-production with New Line Cinema, Happy Madison Productions and Out of the Blue Entertainment
July 3, 2002	Men in Black II	co-production with Amblin Entertainment and Parkes/MacDonald Productions
July 19, 2002	Stuart Little 2	co-production with Red Wagon Entertainment and Franklin/Waterman Productions
July 19, 2002	What to Do in Case of Fire?	German film; co-production with Claussen + Wöbke Filmproduktion
August 2, 2002	The Master of Disguise	distribution outside the U.S. on television and VOD, Scandinavia, Portugal, Israel and Japan only; produced by Revolution Studios, Happy Madison Productions and Out of the Blue Entertainment
August 9, 2002	XXX	distribution outside the U.S. on television and VOD, Scandinavia, Portugal, Israel and Japan only; produced by Revolution Studios and Original Film
September 13, 2002	Stealing Harvard	distribution outside the U.S. on television and VOD, Germany, Austria, Scandinavia, Portugal, Israel and Japan only; produced by Revolution Studios and Imagine Entertainment
September 20, 2002	Trapped	distribution outside Australia, New Zealand, South Africa, Germany, Austria, Iceland, Eastern Europe, the CIS and Japan only; produced by Senator Entertainment, the Canton Company, Mandolin Entertainment and Propaganda Films
October 24, 2002	Big Girls Don't Cry	German film; co-production with Egoli Tossell Film
October 25, 2002	Double Vision	co-production with Nan Fang Film Production
November 1, 2002	Punch-Drunk Love	distribution outside the U.S. on television and VOD, Germany, Austria, Switzerland, Scandinavia, Portugal, Israel and Japan only; produced by Revolution Studios, New Line Cinema and Ghoulardi Film Company
November 1, 2002	I Spy	co-production with Tall Trees Productions, C2 Pictures and Sheldon Leonard Productions
November 27, 2002	Eight Crazy Nights	co-production with Happy Madison Productions
December 6, 2002	Adaptation	distribution in North and Latin America, the U.K., Ireland, Australia, New Zealand, Germany, Austria, Italy, India, Taiwan and Indonesia only; co-production with Intermedia Films, Magnet Productions and Clinica Estetico Productions
December 13, 2002	Maid in Manhattan	distribution outside the U.S. on television and VOD, Scandinavia, Portugal, Israel, and Japan theatrically and on television only; produced by Revolution Studios and Red OM Films

== 2003 ==
Release Date	Title	Notes
January 17, 2003	Big Shot's Funeral	international distribution only; co-production with China Film Group Corporation, Huayi Brothers and Taihe Film Investment Co. Ltd.; distributed in North America by Sony Pictures Classics
January 17, 2003	National Security	co-production with Outlaw Productions, Intermedia and Firm Films
January 24, 2003	Darkness Falls	distribution outside the U.S. on television and VOD, Scandinavia, Portugal and Israel only; produced by Revolution Studios, Distant Corners and Blue Star Pictures
February 6, 2003	Anatomy 2	German film; co-production with Claussen + Wöbke Filmproduktion
March 7, 2003	Tears of the Sun	distribution outside the U.S. on television and VOD, Italy, Scandinavia, Portugal, Israel, and Japan theatrically and on television only; produced by Revolution Studios and Cheyenne Enterprises
March 28, 2003	Basic	North American and Japanese distribution only; produced by Intermedia Films and Phoenix Pictures
April 11, 2003	Anger Management	distribution outside the U.S. on television and VOD, Scandinavia, Portugal, Israel, and Japan theatrically and on television only; produced by Revolution Studios and Happy Madison Productions
April 25, 2003	Identity	co-production with Konrad Pictures
May 9, 2003	Daddy Day Care	distribution outside the U.S. on television and VOD, Scandinavia, Portugal, Israel, and Japan theatrically and on television only; produced by Revolution Studios and Davis Entertainment
June 13, 2003	Hollywood Homicide	distribution outside the U.S. on television and VOD, Italy, Scandinavia, Portugal, Israel, and Japan theatrically and on television only; produced by Revolution Studios
June 27, 2003	Charlie's Angels: Full Throttle	co-production with Flower Films, Tall Trees Productions and Wonderland Sound and Vision
July 2, 2003	Terminator 3: Rise of the Machines (Note: Sony has since also acquired North American and Middle Eastern distribution rights to this film)	international distribution outside the Middle East, Korea and Japan only; produced by Intermedia Films, IMF Productions, C2 Pictures and Mostow/Lieberman Productions; distributed in North America by Warner Bros. Pictures
July 18, 2003	Bad Boys II	co-production with Don Simpson/Jerry Bruckheimer Films
August 1, 2003	Gigli	distribution outside the U.S. on television and VOD, Scandinavia, Portugal and Israel only; produced by Revolution Studios, City Light Films and Casey Silver Productions
August 8, 2003	S.W.A.T.	co-production with Original Film, Camelot Pictures and Chris Lee Productions
September 12, 2003	Once Upon a Time in Mexico	home media, television and North American, Indian and Japanese theatrical distribution only; co-production with Dimension Films and Troublemaker Studios
September 12, 2003	So Close	Hong Kong film; co-production with Eastern Film Production
September 26, 2003	The Rundown	international distribution outside Japan only; co-production with Universal Pictures, WWE Films, Misher Films and Strike Entertainment
October 7, 2003	Seeing Double	co-production with 19 Entertainment and S Club Studios
October 16, 2003	Warriors of Heaven and Earth	Chinese film; distribution outside China only; co-production with Huayi Brothers; distributed in North America by Sony Pictures Classics
October 24, 2003	Radio	distribution outside the U.S. on television and VOD, Scandinavia, Portugal and Israel only; produced by Revolution Studios and Tollin/Robbins Productions
November 21, 2003	Gothika	international distribution outside Japan only; co-production with Warner Bros. Pictures and Dark Castle Entertainment
November 26, 2003	Bad Santa	distribution in Hispanic America, the U.K., Ireland, Australia, New Zealand, South Africa, France, Germany, Austria, Italy and Spain only; produced by Dimension Films and Triptych Pictures
November 26, 2003	The Missing	distribution outside the U.S. on television and VOD, Scandinavia, Portugal, Israel, and Japan theatrically and on television only; produced by Revolution Studios, Imagine Entertainment and Daniel Ostroff Productions
December 12, 2003	Something's Gotta Give	North American distribution only; co-production with Warner Bros. Pictures and Waverly Films
December 18, 2003	Cell Phone	Chinese film; distribution outside China only; co-production with Huayi Brothers
December 19, 2003	Mona Lisa Smile	distribution outside the U.S. on television and VOD, Scandinavia, Portugal, Israel, and Japan theatrically and on television only; produced by Revolution Studios and Red OM Films
December 25, 2003	Big Fish	co-production with the Jinks/Cohen Company and the Zanuck Company
December 25, 2003	Peter Pan (Note: Sony has since also acquired rights to this film in Scandinavia, Portugal and Israel through a licensing deal struck with Revolution Studios in October 2019)	international distribution outside the U.K., Ireland, Australia, New Zealand, South Africa, Scandinavia, Portugal and Israel only; co-acquisition with Universal Pictures; produced by Revolution Studios, Red Wagon Entertainment, and Allied Stars Productions

== 2004 ==
Release Date	Title	Notes
February 13, 2004	50 First Dates	co-production with Happy Madison Productions, Anonymous Content and Flower Films
March 5, 2004	20 30 40	Taiwanese film; co-production with Red on Red and Tang Moon International Productions
March 12, 2004	Secret Window	co-production with Pariah Films
April 2, 2004	Hellboy	distribution outside the U.S. on television and VOD, Scandinavia, Portugal, Israel, and Japan theatrically and on television only; produced by Revolution Studios, Lawrence Gordon Productions and Dark Horse Entertainment
April 23, 2004	13 Going on 30	distribution outside the U.S. on television and VOD, Scandinavia, Portugal and Israel only; produced by Revolution Studios
April 30, 2004	Envy	international distribution only; co-acquisition with DreamWorks Pictures; produced by Castle Rock Entertainment and Baltimore/Spring Creek Pictures
June 23, 2004	White Chicks	distribution outside the U.S. on television and VOD, Scandinavia, Portugal and Israel only; produced by Revolution Studios and Wayans Bros. Entertainment
June 30, 2004	Spider-Man 2	co-production with Marvel Entertainment and Laura Ziskin Productions
August 6, 2004	Little Black Book	distribution outside the U.S. on television and VOD, Scandinavia, Portugal and Israel only; produced by Revolution Studios and Blue Star Pictures
September 24, 2004	The Forgotten	distribution outside the U.S. on television and VOD, Scandinavia, Portugal and Israel only; produced by Revolution Studios and the Jinks/Cohen Company
October 1, 2004	Mountain Patrol: Kekexili	Chinese film; distribution outside China only; co-production with Huayi Brothers and Taihe Film Investment; distributed in North America by Samuel Goldwyn Films
October 22, 2004	The Grudge	North American distribution only; produced by Ghost House Pictures and Vertigo Entertainment (uncredited)
November 12, 2004	Say I Do	Spanish film; co-production with Zebra Producciones
November 24, 2004	Christmas with the Kranks	distribution outside the U.S. on television and VOD, Scandinavia, Portugal and Israel only; produced by Revolution Studios and 1492 Pictures
December 3, 2004	Closer	co-production with Scott Rudin Productions
December 17, 2004	Spanglish	co-production with Gracie Films

== 2005 ==
Release Date	Title	Notes
January 21, 2005	Are We There Yet?	distribution outside the U.S. on television and VOD, Scandinavia, Portugal and Israel only; produced by Revolution Studios and Cube Vision
February 11, 2005	Hitch	co-production with Overbrook Entertainment
February 25, 2005	Man of the House	distribution outside the U.S. on television and VOD, Scandinavia, Portugal and Israel only; produced by Revolution Studios and Steven Reuther Productions
March 25, 2005	Guess Who	North American distribution only; co-production with Regency Enterprises, 3 Arts Entertainment, Tall Trees Productions and Katalyst Media
April 22, 2005	Kung Fu Hustle	international distribution outside China only; distributed in North America by Sony Pictures Classics
April 29, 2005	XXX: State of the Union	distribution outside the U.S. on television and VOD, Scandinavia, Portugal and Israel only; produced by Revolution Studios and Original Film
May 13, 2005	Layer Cake	U.K. and Irish distribution and copyright holder only; produced by Marv Films; distributed elsewhere by Sony Pictures Classics
May 27, 2005	The Longest Yard	international distribution only; co-production with Paramount Pictures, MTV Films, Happy Madison Productions and Callahan Filmworks
June 3, 2005	Lords of Dogtown	co-distribution with TriStar Pictures; co-production with Linson Films and Senator International
June 10, 2005	The Adventures of Sharkboy and Lavagirl	international distribution only; produced by Dimension Films and Troublemaker Studios; distributed in North America by Miramax Films
June 24, 2005	Bewitched	Based on the 1964-1972 television series of the same name; co-production with Red Wagon Entertainment
July 29, 2005	Stealth	co-production with Original Film, Phoenix Pictures and Laura Ziskin Productions
August 12, 2005	Deuce Bigalow: European Gigolo	co-production with Happy Madison Productions and Out of the Blue Entertainment
September 30, 2005	Into the Blue (Note: Owned by MGM)	home media, television and North American theatrical distribution only; produced by Metro-Goldwyn-Mayer and Mandalay Pictures
October 14, 2005	The Fog	distribution outside the U.S. on television and VOD, France, Scandinavia, Portugal and Israel only; produced by Revolution Studios and David Foster Productions
October 28, 2005	The Legend of Zorro	distribution outside Australia, New Zealand, Greece, Cyprus, Iceland, Portugal, Angola, Mozambique, Israel, Poland, Hungary, Romania, French home media and television, German-language television, and Italian free television only; co-production with Spyglass Entertainment, Amblin Entertainment and Parkes/MacDonald Productions; co-distributed in Japan by Shochiku and Buena Vista International
November 11, 2005	Zathura: A Space Adventure	co-production with Radar Pictures, Teitler Film and Michael De Luca Productions
November 18, 2005	Melissa P.	Italian film; co-production with Bess Movie, and Pentagrama Films
November 23, 2005	Rent	distribution outside the U.S. on television and VOD, Scandinavia, Portugal, Israel and Japan theatrically only; produced by Revolution Studios, 1492 Pictures and Tribeca Productions
November 23, 2005	Yours, Mine & Ours	international distribution only; produced by Metro-Goldwyn-Mayer, Paramount Pictures, Nickelodeon Movies and Robert Simonds Productions; remake of the 1968 film
December 21, 2005	Fun with Dick and Jane	Remake of the 1977 film; co-production with Imagine Entertainment and JC 23 Entertainment
December 23, 2005	Memoirs of a Geisha	distribution outside the U.K., Ireland, Australia, New Zealand, France, Germany, Austria, Switzerland, Italy, Greece, Cyprus, Iceland, Portugal, Angola, Mozambique, Israel, Poland, Hungary, Romania, the CIS and the Baltics only; co-production with DreamWorks Pictures, Spyglass Entertainment, Amblin Entertainment and Red Wagon Entertainment
December 25, 2005	The Producers	international distribution only; co-production with Universal Pictures and Brooksfilms

== 2006 ==
Release Date	Title	Notes
February 10, 2006	The Pink Panther	North American distribution only; produced by Metro-Goldwyn-Mayer and Robert Simonds Productions
February 17, 2006	Freedomland	distribution outside the U.S. on television and VOD, Scandinavia, Portugal and Israel only; produced by Revolution Studios and Scott Rudin Productions
April 7, 2006	The Benchwarmers	distribution outside the U.S. on television and VOD, Scandinavia, Portugal and Israel only; produced by Revolution Studios and Happy Madison Productions
April 28, 2006	RV	co-production with Relativity Media, Red Wagon Entertainment and Intermedia
May 19, 2006	The Da Vinci Code	co-production with Imagine Entertainment and Skylark Productions
June 23, 2006	Click	co-production with Revolution Studios, Happy Madison Productions and Original Film
July 14, 2006	Little Man	distribution outside the U.S. on television and VOD, Scandinavia, Portugal and Israel only; produced by Revolution Studios and Wayans Bros. Entertainment
July 21, 2006	Monster House	co-production with Relativity Media, ImageMovers and Amblin Entertainment
August 4, 2006	Talladega Nights: The Ballad of Ricky Bobby	co-production with Relativity Media, the Apatow Company and Mosaic Media Group
August 11, 2006	Zoom	distribution outside the U.S. on television and VOD, Scandinavia, Portugal and Israel only; produced by Revolution Studios, Team Todd Films and Boxing Cat Films
September 1, 2006	Riding Alone for Thousands of Miles	international distribution outside China, Hong Kong and Japan only; distributed in North America by Sony Pictures Classics
September 15, 2006	Gridiron Gang	co-production with Relativity Media, Original Film and Stanhaven Productions
September 22, 2006	All the King's Men	remake of 1949 film; co-production with Relativity Media and Phoenix Pictures
September 29, 2006	Open Season	co-production with Sony Pictures Animation
October 13, 2006	The Grudge 2	North American distribution only; produced by Ghost House Pictures and Vertigo Entertainment (uncredited)
October 20, 2006	Marie Antoinette	distribution outside France, Switzerland, the Benelux and Japan only; co-production with Pricel, Tohokushinsha Film Corporation and American Zoetrope
November 10, 2006	Stranger than Fiction	distribution outside Australia, New Zealand, Switzerland, Portugal, Scandinavia, India, Greece, Cyprus, Iceland, Turkey, Eastern Europe, the Baltics, the CIS and the Middle East only; produced by Mandate Pictures and Three Strange Angels
November 17, 2006	Casino Royale	theatrical and home media distribution only; produced by Metro-Goldwyn-Mayer and Eon Productions
December 8, 2006	The Holiday	North American distribution only; co-production with Universal Pictures and Waverly Films
December 15, 2006	The Pursuit of Happyness	co-production with Relativity Media, Overbrook Entertainment and Escape Artists; rights licensed to Medusa Film for Italy
December 20, 2006	Rocky Balboa	studio credit and North American home media distribution only; produced by Metro-Goldwyn-Mayer, Revolution Studios, Chartoff Productions and Winkler Films

== 2007 ==
Release Date	Title	Notes
January 26, 2007	Catch and Release	co-production with Relativity Media
February 2, 2007	The Messengers	North American co-distribution with Screen Gems only; produced by Ghost House Pictures and Blue Star Pictures
February 16, 2007	Ghost Rider	co-production with Crystal Sky Pictures, Relativity Media, Marvel Entertainment and Michael De Luca Productions; rights licensed to SND Films for France
March 9, 2007	Charm School	Mexican film
March 23, 2007	Reign Over Me	co-production with Relativity Media, Madison 23 Productions and Sunlight Productions
April 4, 2007	Are We Done Yet?	distribution outside the U.S. on television and VOD, Scandinavia, Portugal and Israel only; produced by Revolution Studios, RKO Pictures and Cube Vision
April 13, 2007	Perfect Stranger	distribution outside the U.S. on television and VOD, Scandinavia, Portugal, Israel and Japan theatrically only; produced by Revolution Studios
May 4, 2007	Spider-Man 3	co-production with Marvel Entertainment and Laura Ziskin Productions
June 8, 2007	Surf's Up	co-production with Sony Pictures Animation
August 17, 2007	Superbad	co-production with the Apatow Company
September 21, 2007	Blinkers	Spanish film; co-production with Morena Films and Telecinco Cinema
October 12, 2007	Across the Universe	distribution outside the U.S. on television and VOD, Scandinavia, Portugal, Israel and Japan theatrically only; produced by Revolution Studios and Team Todd Films
October 12, 2007	We Own the Night	North American and Indian distribution only; produced by 2929 Productions and Nick Wechsler Productions
October 19, 2007	30 Days of Night	distribution in North and Latin America, Spain, Portugal and Asia excluding Korea and Japan only; produced by Ghost House Pictures and Dark Horse Entertainment
November 9, 2007	Saawariya	Indian film; co-production with Sanjay Leela Bhansali Films
December 21, 2007	Walk Hard: The Dewey Cox Story	co-production with Relativity Media and Nominated Films
December 25, 2007	The Water Horse: Legend of the Deep	distribution outside the U.S. on television and VOD, Scandinavia, Portugal and Israel only; produced by Revolution Studios, Walden Media, Beacon Pictures and Ecosse Films

== 2008 ==
Release Date	Title	Notes
February 22, 2008	Vantage Point	co-production with Relativity Media and Original Film
February 29, 2008	The Other Boleyn Girl	North American distribution only; co-production with Focus Features, BBC Films, Relativity Media, Ruby Films and Scott Rudin Productions
March 14, 2008	CJ7	international distribution outside China only; distributed in North America by Sony Pictures Classics
March 28, 2008	21	co-production with Relativity Media, Trigger Street Productions and Michael De Luca Productions
April 11, 2008	Road to Fame	Mexican film
May 2, 2008	Made of Honor	co-production with Relativity Media and Original Film
June 6, 2008	You Don't Mess with the Zohan	co-production with Relativity Media and Happy Madison Productions
July 2, 2008	Hancock	co-production with Relativity Media, Blue Light, Weed Road Pictures and Overbrook Entertainment
July 25, 2008	Step Brothers	co-production with Relativity Media, the Apatow Company, Mosaic Media Group and Gary Sanchez Productions
August 6, 2008	Pineapple Express	co-production with Relativity Media and the Apatow Company
August 22, 2008	The House Bunny	co-production with Relativity Media, Happy Madison Productions and Alta Loma Entertainment
October 3, 2008	Nick & Norah's Infinite Playlist	distribution only; produced by Mandate Pictures and Depth of Field
October 10, 2008	Hello	Indian film; co-production with Percept Picture Company, Mirah Entertainment, Funky Buddha Media and Reel Life Production
November 14, 2008	Quantum of Solace	theatrical distribution only; produced by Metro-Goldwyn-Mayer and Eon Productions
December 5, 2008	Meerabai Not Out	Indian film; distribution only; co-production with Pritish Nandy Communications
December 19, 2008	Seven Pounds	co-production with Relativity Media, Overbrook Entertainment and Escape Artists

== 2009 ==
Release Date	Title	Notes
January 16, 2009	Paul Blart: Mall Cop	co-production with Relativity Media and Happy Madison Productions
January 22, 2009	The Best Movie 2	Russian film; co-production with Monumental Pictures and Comedy Club Production
February 6, 2009	The Pink Panther 2	theatrical distribution only; produced by Metro-Goldwyn-Mayer and Robert Simonds Productions
February 13, 2009	The International	co-production with Relativity Media and Atlas Entertainment
March 20, 2009	Straight	Indian film; co-production with Idream Productions
May 15, 2009	Angels & Demons	co-production with Imagine Entertainment and Skylark Productions
May 21, 2009	Terminator Salvation	international distribution outside the Middle East and Korea only; produced by the Halcyon Company, Moritz Borman Productions and Wonderland Sound and Vision; co-distributed in Japan by Toho-Towa; distributed in North America by Warner Bros. Pictures
June 12, 2009	The Taking of Pelham 1 2 3	co-production with Metro-Goldwyn-Mayer, Relativity Media, Scott Free Productions and Escape Artists
June 19, 2009	Year One	co-production with Ocean Pictures and the Apatow Company
July 24, 2009	The Ugly Truth	co-production with Relativity Media, Lakeshore Entertainment and Steven Reuther Productions
July 31, 2009	Funny People	studio credit and copyright holder only; co-production with Universal Pictures, Relativity Media, Apatow Productions and Madison 23 Productions
August 7, 2009	Julie & Julia	co-production with Easy There Tiger Productions, Laurence Mark Productions and Scott Rudin Productions
August 7, 2009	Teree Sang	Indian film
September 18, 2009	Cloudy with a Chance of Meatballs	co-production with Sony Pictures Animation
October 2, 2009	Zombieland	co-production with Relativity Media and Pariah; rights licensed to Nikkatsu for Japan
October 9, 2009	The Damned United	British film; international distribution only; co-production with BBC Films, Left Bank Pictures and Screen Yorkshire; distributed in North America by Sony Pictures Classics
October 28, 2009	Michael Jackson's This Is It	co-production with the Michael Jackson Company, LLC and AEG Live
November 13, 2009	2012	co-production with Centropolis Entertainment
December 3, 2009	Jump	Hong Kong film; co-production with Columbia Pictures Film Productions Asia Limited, Star Overseas and China Film Group Corporation
December 18, 2009	Did You Hear About the Morgans?	co-production with Relativity Media, Castle Rock Entertainment and Banter Films

== See also ==
- List of film serials by studio § Columbia Pictures
- Columbia Pictures
- List of TriStar Pictures films
- List of Screen Gems films
- Sony Pictures Classics
- Category:Lists of films by studio
