= Are We There Yet? (franchise) =

Film franchise article

- Official franchise logo, as originally released in 2005.
- Starring: Ice Cube; Nia Long; Various actors (See below)
- Distributed by: Sony Pictures Entertainment
- Country: United States
- Language: English
- Budget: $48,000,000 (2 films)
- Box office: $156,502,539 (2 films)

The Are We There Yet? franchise is an American media franchise produced by Cube Vision and Revolution Studios. It consists of two theatrical family-comedy films and a television series. It centers around bachelor Nick Persons (portrayed by Ice Cube) who becomes infatuated with single mother Suzanne Kingston (Nia Long) and finds himself becoming a stepfather to her two children. Each installment details the comedic circumstances that arise as he adjusts to his new role.

The first film was met with negative reception, though it turned a profit at the box office. The sequel was poorly received critically, while also earning less than half monetarily than its predecessor. The television series spin-off was additionally received with negative reception from critics and viewers alike. A third film is in early development.

== Film ==
| Film | U.S. release date | Director | Screenwriter(s) | Story by | Producers |
|---|---|---|---|---|---|
| Are We There Yet? | January 21, 2005 | Brian Levant | Steven Gary Banks & Claudia Grazioso and J. David Stem & David N. Weiss | Steven Gary Banks & Claudia Grazioso | Ice Cube, Matt Alvarez and Dan Kolsrud |
| Are We Done Yet? | April 4, 2007 | Steve Carr | Hank Nelken | Hank Nelken | Ice Cube, Matt Alvarez, Ted Hartley and Todd Garner |
| Are They Gone Yet? | TBA | TBA | Chris Hazzard & Mike Fontana | Chris Hazzard & Mike Fontana | Ice Cube, Jeff Kwatinetz and Todd Garner |

=== Are We There Yet? (2005) ===
Nick Persons, an eligible bachelor meets the woman of his dreams named Suzanne Kingston. Initially infatuated with her, he's disappointed to discover that she has two children with her ex-husband. Lindsey and Kevin, who wish their parents would get back together seek for every opportunity to end Suzanne's relationships. As Nick and Suzanne begin to build a real friendship, she is pleased to find that he regularly offers to assist her with her needs.

After taking her to the airport and her departure for an upcoming business trip in Vancouver, Suzanne finds out her ex-husband will not take the children on New Years Eve. Nick offers to bring her children to Vancouver to avoid Suzanne potentially losing her job to stay with the children. When the three are kicked out of the airport and train station, the three embark on the drive to Vancouver in Nick's new Lincoln Navigator. Though they hope to rekindle the love between their parents, the children are heartbroken to discover that their father has been making excuses to avoid spending time with them, and that he has started a new family of his own. Nick realizes that through the series of comedic misadventures along the way he has grown to care for the children, and feels a responsibility to express his appreciation for them. In doing so, Suzanne sees his parenting potential and the couple begin a serious relationship together, much to the siblings' delight.

=== Are We Done Yet? (2007) ===
A couple of years later, Nick and Suzanne are married and looking for every opportunity to build a stronger relationship with combined family. Lindsey and Kevin are entering the early experiences of adolescence, just as Suzanne announces to everyone that she is pregnant with twins. Realizing that they will need more living space, the family moves to the country and Nick purchases a home from a local real estate agent named Chuck.

Nick quickly regrets their decision, as they discover a mold infestation among a growing list of issues with the house. Despite this, Chuck and his crew offer to complete the repairs that are required to make their home more livable. Though Lindsey initially had distaste for the family's decision to move, she and a young crewman named Danny Pulu become romantically involved. As Nick tries to finalize a contract with Earvin "Magic" Johnson at work, his boss calls him to state that the company may move on from this assignment. On top of this, the contractors notify the family that the house will need a new foundation along with all of the repairs. Discouraged by work and familial responsibilities, the family must learn to depend on each other while building a stronger foundations to their love and prepare for the birth of the twins in the meantime.

=== Are They Gone Yet? (TBA) ===
In June 2026, it was announced a third feature film installment titled Are They Gone Yet? was announced as to be in development film was in development. Ice Cube and Nia Long were confirmed to reprise their roles from the previous movies, as Nicolas "Nick" Persons and Suzanne Kingston-Persons, respectively. Written by Chris Hazzard and Mike Fontana, the story centers around the couple's experiences as grandparents and Nick's comedic challenges throughout the experience. Ice Cube, Todd Garner and Jeff Kwatinetz serve as producers. The project is intended to be a joint-venture production between CubeVision, Broken Road Productions, and Skydance Sports.

== Television ==
In July 2009, it was announced that a spin-off television series was in development. Ali LeRoi was announced to serve as the show's creator, writer, showrunner and executive producer. Initially planned as a made-for-TV adaptation, it was later described as a continuation of the film series, albeit with a new cast starring Terry Crews, Essence Atkins, Teala Dunn, and Coy Stewart in the primary roles of Nick, Suzanne, Lindsey, and Kevin, respectively. O'Shea "Ice Cube" Jackson Sr. would serve as an additional executive producer and feature in a recurring role as Suzanne's protective paramilitary brother. Taking place chronologically between the two movies, the plot centers around the adventures of the combined Kingston-Persons family, six months after the marriage of Nick and Suzanne, and their efforts in building meaningful relationships between them and her children.

The series was a joint-venture production between Revolution Studios, Debmar-Mercury, and Cube Vision and aired on TBS for 3 seasons, and a total of 100 episodes. The show was met with mixed reception overall, with critics calling the series inferior to Everybody Hates Chris, the previous collaboration between LeRoi and Crews.

== Cast and characters ==
List indicators

This section includes characters who will appear or have appeared in the franchise in notable roles.

- An empty grey cell indicates the character was not in the film, or that the character's official presence has not yet been confirmed.
- ^{C} indicates a cameo role.
- ^{V} indicates a voice-only role.

| Character | Films | | Television |
| Character | Are We There Yet? | Are We Done Yet? | Are We There Yet? (The Series) |
|---|---|---|---|
| Nicolas "Nick" Persons | Ice Cube | Ice Cube | Terry Crews |
| Suzanne Kingston-Persons | Nia Long | Nia Long | Essence Atkins |
| Lindsey Kingston-Persons | Aleisha Allen | Aleisha Allen | Teala Dunn |
| Kevin Kingston-Persons | Philip Daniel Bolden | Philip Daniel Bolden | Coy Stewart |
| Kingston-Persons Twins | | Colin Strange & Gavin Strange | |
| Terrance | | | Ice Cube |
| Satchel Paige Bobblehead | Tracy Morgan^{V} | | |
| Al Buck | M. C. Gainey | | |
| Martin "Marty" | Jay Mohr | | Christian Finnegan |
| Miss Mable | Nichelle Nichols | | |
| Frank Kingston | Sean Millington^{C} | | Charlie Murphy |
| Chuck Mitchell Jr. | | John C. McGinley | |
| Danny Pulu | | Tahj Mowry | |
| Billy Pulu | | Dan Joffre | |
| Georgie Pulu | | Pedro Miguel Arce | |
| Mike | | Jacob Vargas | |
| Mr. Rooney | | Jonathan Katz | |
| Marilyn Persons | | | Telma Hopkins |

== Additional production and crew details ==
| Film | Crew/Detail | | | | | |
| Film | Composer | Cinematographer | Editor(s) | Production companies | Distributing companies | Running time |
|---|---|---|---|---|---|---|
| Are We There Yet? | David Newman | Thomas E. Ackerman | Lawrence Jordan | Sony Pictures, Columbia Pictures, Revolution Studios, Cube Vision Inc. | Sony Pictures Releasing | 1 hr 34 mins |
| Are We Done Yet? | Teddy Castellucci | Jack N. Green | Craig P. Herring | Sony Pictures, Columbia Pictures, Revolution Studios, Cube Vision Inc., RKO Radio Pictures, Revolution Dream Productions | Sony Pictures Releasing | 1 hr 32 mins |

== Reception ==
=== Box office and financial performance ===
| Film | Box office gross | | | Box office ranking | | Budget | Worldwide net total income | Ref. |
| Film | North America | Other territories | Worldwide | All-time North America | All-time worldwide | Budget | Worldwide net total income | Ref. |
|---|---|---|---|---|---|---|---|---|
| Are We There Yet? | $82,674,398 | $15,440,073 | $98,114,471 | #1,015 | #3,919 | $20,000,000 $32,000,000 | $78,114,471 | |
| Are We Done Yet? | $49,662,533 | $8,725,535 | $58,388,068 | #1,872 | #5,053 | $28,000,000 | $30,388,068 | |
| Totals | $132,336,931 | $24,165,608 | $156,502,539 | x̄ #1,444 | x̄ 4,486 | $48,000,000 | $108,502,539 | |

=== Critical and public response ===
| Film | Rotten Tomatoes | Metacritic | CinemaScore |
|---|---|---|---|
| Are We There Yet? | 11% (115 reviews) | 27/100 (28 reviews) | B+ |
| Are We Done Yet? | 7% (91 reviews) | 36/100 (21 reviews) | B |
| Are We There Yet? (The Series) | 40% (5 reviews) | 47/100 (10 reviews) | —N/a |
