= List of 2005 box office number-one films in Canada =

This is a list of films which have placed number one at the weekend box office in Canada during 2005.

== Weekend gross list ==
†	This implies the highest-grossing movie of the year.

#	Weekend End Date	Film	Weekend Gross (millions)	Notes
1	January 2, 2005	Meet the Fockers	$3.25	
2	January 9, 2005	Meet the Fockers	$2.51	
3	January 16, 2005	Meet the Fockers	$1.72	Coach Carter was #1 in America.
4	January 23, 2005	Meet the Fockers	$1.06	Are We There Yet? was #1 in America.
5	January 30, 2005	Hide and Seek	$1.68	
6	February 6, 2005	Boogeyman	$1.33	
7	February 13, 2005	Hitch	$3.16	
8	February 20, 2005	Hitch	$2.16	
9	February 27, 2005	Hitch	$1.74	Diary of a Mad Black Woman was #1 in America.
10	March 6, 2005	Be Cool	$1.69	The Pacifier was #1 in America.
11	March 13, 2005	Robots	$2.07	
12	March 20, 2005	The Ring Two	$2.34	
13	March 27, 2005	Guess Who	$1.46	
14	April 3, 2005	Sin City	$2.79	
15	April 10, 2005	Sahara	$1.51	
16	April 17, 2005	The Amityville Horror	$1.64	
17	April 24, 2005	The Interpreter	$1.98	
18	May 1, 2005	The Hitchhiker's Guide to the Galaxy	$1.98	
19	May 8, 2005	Kingdom of Heaven	$1.86	
20	May 15, 2005	Kicking and Screaming	$1.44	Monster-in-Law was #1 in America.
21	May 22, 2005	Star Wars: Episode III – Revenge of the Sith †	$8.62	Star Wars Episode III: Revenge of the Sith had the highest weekend debut of 2005 in North America.
22	May 29, 2005	Star Wars: Episode III – Revenge of the Sith †	$4.12	
23	June 5, 2005	Madagascar	$2.79	Madagascar reached No. 1 in its second weekend of release.
24	June 12, 2005	Mr. & Mrs. Smith	$3.87	
25	June 19, 2005	Batman Begins	$3.66	
26	June 26, 2005	Batman Begins	$2.15	
27	July 3, 2005	War of the Worlds	$4.59	
28	July 10, 2005	Fantastic Four	$3.05	
29	July 17, 2005	Charlie and the Chocolate Factory	$3.21	
30	July 24, 2005	Wedding Crashers	$2.59	Wedding Crashers reached No. 1 in its second weekend of release. Charlie and the Chocolate Factory was No. 1 in America.
31	July 31, 2005	Wedding Crashers	$1.90	
32	August 7, 2005	The Dukes of Hazzard	$2.22	
33	August 14, 2005	Four Brothers	$1.39	
34	August 21, 2005	The 40-Year-Old Virgin	$1.80	
35	August 28, 2005	The 40-Year-Old Virgin	$1.50	
36	September 4, 2005	Transporter 2	$1.56	
37	September 11, 2005	The Exorcism of Emily Rose	$2.68	
38	September 18, 2005	The Exorcism of Emily Rose	$1.42	Just Like Heaven was #1 in America.
39	September 25, 2005	Flightplan	$1.89	
40	October 2, 2005	Flightplan	$1.19	
41	October 9, 2005	Wallace & Gromit: The Curse of the Were-Rabbit	$1.09	Wallace & Gromit: The Curse of the Were-Rabbit won the 78th Academy Award for Best Animated Feature.
42	October 16, 2005	Wallace & Gromit: The Curse of the Were-Rabbit	$1.07	The Fog was #1 in America.
43	October 23, 2005	Doom	$1.24	
44	October 30, 2005	Saw II	$1.18	
45	November 6, 2005	Chicken Little	$2.37	
46	November 13, 2005	Chicken Little	$2.13	
47	November 20, 2005	Harry Potter and the Goblet of Fire	$10.12	Harry Potter and the Goblet of Fire had the highest weekend debut of 2005.
48	November 27, 2005	Harry Potter and the Goblet of Fire	$5.50	
49	December 4, 2005	Harry Potter and the Goblet of Fire	$3.05	
50	December 11, 2005	The Chronicles of Narnia: The Lion, the Witch, and the Wardrobe	$4.34	
51	December 18, 2005	King Kong	$3.46	
52	December 25, 2005	King Kong	$1.41	

== See also ==
- List of American films — American films by year
