= Are We There Yet? (TV series) =

American television sitcom (2010–2013)

- Genre: Sitcom
- Created by: Ice Cube; Ali LeRoi
- Based on: Characters by Steven Gary Banks; Claudia Grazioso
- Developed by: Ali LeRoi
- Starring: Terry Crews; Essence Atkins; Coy Stewart; Teala Dunn; Christian Finnegan; Keesha Sharp; Telma Hopkins
- Composer: Stanley A. Smith
- Country of origin: United States
- Original language: English
- No. of seasons: 3
- No. of episodes: 100 (list of episodes)

Production
- Executive producers: Ali LeRoi; Ice Cube; Joe Roth; Matt Alvarez; Vince Totino
- Producers: Jason Shuman; William Sherak; Michele Armour
- Camera setup: Videotape (filmized); Multi-camera
- Running time: 22 minutes
- Production companies: Revolution Television; 5914 Productions, LTD.; Cube Vision; Debmar-Mercury

Original release
- Network: TBS
- Release: June 2, 2010 – March 1, 2013

Are We There Yet? is an American television sitcom that ran on TBS for three seasons from June 2, 2010, to March 1, 2013. A spin-off of the 2005 feature film of the same name, the show is considered the third and final installment in the titular franchise. The series centers around a family dealing with normal family situations plus adapting to a new family setup after a divorced mother remarries. Ice Cube, Ali LeRoi, Matt Alvarez, Vince Totino, and Joe Roth served as the show's executive producers.

== Premise ==
The series takes place in a continuity different from that of the films Are We There Yet? and Are We Done Yet?, and centers on the blended Kingston-Persons of Seattle facing the challenges of everyday life in a new blended family. Nick Persons (Terry Crews) and Suzanne Kingston-Persons (Essence Atkins) have been married for 6 months and former athlete Nick has sold his sports-memorabilia shop and taken a job in information technology. He is still trying to figure out his role in the family and bond with Suzanne's two children: Lindsey (Teala Dunn), who's forever texting on her cell phone, and Kevin (Coy Stewart), who's usually seen playing video games or playing with his best friend Troy. The kids' father is Suzanne's ex-husband Frank Kingston, who has a new wife and son. Suzanne herself has a busy schedule as a party planner. Nick's mother (Telma Hopkins) is not happy about her son's recent marriage or her new role as a grandmother and has a hard time getting along with her new daughter-in-law. On occasion, Nick will have an encounter with Suzanne's older Black Ops brother Terrence (Ice Cube) who reminds him to treat Suzanne right as Terrence also does check-ins with the rest of the family.

The series draws its humor from everyday family situations. Though sharing the title and characters from the original film, the story is more similar to the storyline of its sequel, Are We Done Yet? as opposed to Are We There Yet?.

== Episodes ==
Season	Episodes	Originally released	
Season	Episodes	First released	Last released
1	10	June 2, 2010	June 30, 2010
2	34	January 5, 2011	May 4, 2011
3	56	September 17, 2012	March 1, 2013

== Cast ==
=== Main ===
- Terry Crews replaces Ice Cube as Nick Kingston-Persons, Suzanne's husband and Lindsey and Kevin's stepfather. New to marriage and fatherhood, Nick is an ex-athlete who works in TV sports commentary. The only child of an eccentric mother, he possesses solid family values and a strong work ethic. Nick used to own a sports-memorabilia store, but he recently sold the business to his best friend Martin and got a job as a sports reporter at KAWT. Nick later becomes a part-owner in Martin's sports-themed bar/restaurant called Martin.
- Essence Atkins replaces Nia Long as Suzanne Kingston-Persons, Nick's wife, Lindsey and Kevin's mother, and Terrence's sister. Suzanne is a modern woman with a career and love for her family. As a newlywed mother of two, she's trying to juggle family and career, while also trying to have a little fun. Suzanne is a successful event planner, known for her creative edge and attention to detail. She also has a childish wit.
- Coy Stewart replaces Philip Daniel Bolden as Kevin Kingston-Persons, Suzanne's son, Nick's stepson, and Lindsey's younger brother. He is an avid soccer fan and can regularly be found watching his favorite player on TV. He also has a great interest in technology and computers. Smarter than his 10-year-old friends, Kevin is as precocious as he is lovable. He also has asthma, which was first seen in the 2005 film adaption. He loves to find his way around the rules and really wants to be the center of attention. Kevin is 10 in season one and turns 13 in season three.
- Teala Dunn replaces Aleisha Allen as Lindsey Kingston-Persons, Suzanne's daughter, Nick's stepdaughter, and Kevin's older sister. At 15, Lindsey is a typical teen girl, who loves spending time with her friends and is attached to her cellphone. She has a strong bond with her parents and little brother, but she would prefer to hang out with friends instead of family. Lindsey often gets in a little trouble and she and Kevin often blackmail each other.
- Christian Finnegan replaces Jay Mohr as Martin aka Marty, Nick's best friend who now owns a sports-themed bar/restaurant. Martin is a lovable rogue who is single and dating. Quick dialogue from an episode implies that he may have once had a relationship with Suzanne's friend Gigi. He enjoys life and his friends, and helps Nick with any problems with Suzanne.
- Keesha Sharp as Gigi, Suzanne's assistant and best girlfriend. Always ready for a good time, she frequently jets to the hottest parties in and out of town. She convinces Suzanne to not blame Nick so much.
- Telma Hopkins as Marilyn Persons (recurring, season 1; main, seasons 2–3), Nick's mother, Suzanne's mother-in-law, and the kids' step-grandmother. She is constantly on the go and not available for babysitting. Marilyn is not thrilled about being any kind of grandmother and she isn't crazy about her new daughter-in-law. As Nick is her only child, she has to adjust to his new life as a husband and father.

=== Recurring ===
The cast of Are We There Yet? (from left to right), Coy Stewart as Kevin, Essence Atkins as Suzanne, Terry Crews as Nick, Teala Dunn as Lindsey and recurring cast member Ice Cube as Terrence.

- Ice Cube as Terrence, Suzanne's paramilitary brother, Nick's brother-in-law, and the kids' uncle. Because he works for a Covert Government Agency that specializes in black ops, he is very secretive. He is protective of his only sister and uses every opportunity to remind Nick that he better be good to her, even by threatening to kill him. One of his running gags is when he points and says "What's that?" and the person he's talking to will look away and will look back to see him disappear and hear the door slam. Ice Cube previously portrayed Nick in the films.
- Charlie Murphy replaces Sean Millington as Frank Kingston, Suzanne's ex-husband, Kevin and Lindsey's estranged father, Terrence's former brother-in-law and Nick's rival. Frank neglected Kevin and Lindsey and is seen throughout the show trying to reconcile with the family, but Suzanne and Nick no longer trust him.
- Michael Hall D'Addario as Troy, Kevin's best friend. Troy is a huge fan of African American culture. He knows a lot for his age and is known to be very smart, although he possesses mostly street smarts. He sometimes lies to his mother Jackie about his whereabouts so that he can scheme with Kevin.
- Annie Q. as Kelly, Lindsey's best friend.
- Jacqueline Mazarella as Jackie, Troy's mother.
- Sherrod Small as Malcolm, Nick's friend.
- Joe D'Onofrio as Staten Island Mike, Nick's friend.
- Darrell Hammond as Brick Street (season 3), a KAWT anchor.

== Production and development ==
The show is loosely based on the 2005 film of the same name and its 2007 sequel, released by Revolution Studios. However, the roles of Nick Persons, Suzanne Kingston, her two children, and Nick's friend Martin were recast for the series. The only cast member from the films to appear is the show's executive producer, Ice Cube, though he appears in a recurring role as Terrence, Suzanne's brother and the kids' uncle. Although the series is appropriate for all ages, it is not as family-oriented as the films.

TBS greenlit the series in June 2009 for a 10 episode order, with the option to extend the episode order to 90 episodes. Unlike most sitcoms, the production of Are We There Yet? runs on a schedule which allows three episodes to be filmed over the course of a one-week period. The series is being distributed by Debmar-Mercury. The series was filmed at the Connecticut Film Center in Stamford.

On Wednesday, May 18, 2011, it was announced that Are We There Yet? would return for new episodes on Friday starting September 30, 2011 at 8/7c on TBS. Are We There Yet? officially ended on March 1, 2013.

== Awards and nominations ==
Awards and nominations for Are We There Yet?
Award	Year	Category	Nominee	Result	Ref.
GLAAD Media Awards	2012	Outstanding Individual Episode	"The Boy Has Style"	Nominated	
NAACP Image Awards	2011	Outstanding Supporting Actor in a Comedy Series	Ice Cube	Won	
NAACP Image Awards	2011	Outstanding Comedy Series	Are We There Yet?	Nominated	
NAACP Image Awards	2011	Outstanding Actress in a Comedy Series	Essence Atkins	Nominated	
NAACP Image Awards	2011	Outstanding Actor in a Comedy Series	Terry Crews	Nominated	
NAACP Image Awards	2012	Outstanding Actor in a Comedy Series	Terry Crews	Nominated	
NAMIC Vision Awards	2011	Best Performance - Comedy	Terry Crews	Nominated	
NAMIC Vision Awards	2011	Comedy	Are We There Yet?	Nominated	
NAMIC Vision Awards	2012	Comedy	Are We There Yet?	Nominated	
Young Artist Awards	2011	Best Performance in a TV Series (Comedy or Drama) - Supporting Young Actress	Teala Dunn	Won	
Young Artist Awards	2011	Best Performance in a TV Series (Comedy or Drama) - Supporting Young Actor	Coy Stewart	Won	
