= List of Are We There Yet? episodes =

This is a list of episodes for the TBS sitcom Are We There Yet?. The series premiered on June 2, 2010.

Episode titles of Are We There Yet? always start with "The" and end with "Episode" referencing a plot point or quirk in the episode.

== Series overview ==
Season	Episodes	Originally released	
Season	Episodes	First released	Last released
1	10	June 2, 2010	June 30, 2010
2	34	January 5, 2011	May 4, 2011
3	56	September 17, 2012	March 1, 2013

== Episodes ==
=== Season 1 (2010) ===
No. overall	No. in season	Title	Directed by	Written by	Original release date	Prod. code	U.S. viewers (millions)
1	1	"The Hyphenated Name Episode"	Ali LeRoi	Ali LeRoi	June 2, 2010	101	3.2
Nick is bothered by Suzanne wanting to keep her ex-husband's last name in addition to keeping his last name.
2	2	"The Credit Check Episode"	Ali LeRoi	Ali LeRoi	June 2, 2010	106	3.3
Nick wants to buy a new car for work, but gets a hard time from Suzanne about their tight budget. Meanwhile, Kevin and Martin unknowingly compete in a tennis multi-player video game via the Internet.
3	3	"The Day Off Episode"	Ali LeRoi	Luisa Leschin	June 9, 2010	104	2.6
Suzanne experiences a day away from her professional duties, but she doesn't seem to know what to do with herself during her free time; Nick comes to the decision that the children need to spend more quality time with his mother, Marilyn.
4	4	"The Soccer Episode"	Ali LeRoi	Jason M. Palmer	June 9, 2010	102	2.7
Nick tries to bond with Kevin, but struggles to understand exactly what his stepson sees in the international sport of soccer; Suzanne is frustrated by Lindsey's lack of communication and creates a fake Facebook account to learn what is going on in her daughter's life.
5	5	"The Rat in the House Episode"	Ali LeRoi	Luisa Leschin	June 16, 2010	107	2.6
Kevin watches over a friend's pet rat that suddenly gets loose in the house, with a scared Nick trying to catch it. Meanwhile, Suzanne becomes concerned that Gigi is a bad influence on Lindsey.
6	6	"The Booty Episode"	Ali LeRoi	Jason M. Palmer	June 16, 2010	109	N/A
Nick gets in trouble with Suzanne after neglecting to tell her that he visited a sexually suggestive pirate-themed restaurant named Booty (à la Hooters). Meanwhile, Lindsey and Kevin pester Suzanne about their allowances.
7	7	"The Viral Video Episode"	Ali LeRoi	Adam Lorenzo	June 23, 2010	105	2.2
A video of Suzanne dancing to her favorite song "Baby Got Back" hits the web due to Kevin leaving his webcam on. Meanwhile, Marilyn teaches Lindsey how to cook soul food.
8	8	"The Michelle Obama Sweater Episode"	Ali LeRoi	Adam Lorenzo	June 23, 2010	103	N/A
Suzanne forbids Lindsey to use her credit card to buy a Michelle Obama sweater online. She then goes behind her back and asks Nick to help her get the sweater. Meanwhile, Martin asks Kevin to pretend to be a disadvantaged orphan in order to get an autographed Alex Rodriguez bat.
9	9	"The No Nah Nah Episode"	Ali LeRoi	Ali LeRoi	June 30, 2010	108	2.1
Nick feels inadequate about making love to Suzanne while the kids are in the house. Suzanne assumes from Nick's behavior that he is cheating on her. Meanwhile, Martin tries to determine the age of his teenage-looking girlfriend.
10	10	"The Get Together Episode"	Ali LeRoi	Ali LeRoi	June 30, 2010	110	2.4
Nick arranges a get together with his friends and family. Terrence invites a woman he met at a bank hostage and Kevin invites his birth father, Suzanne's ex-husband Frank, unbeknownst to everyone else. Guest Star: Charlie Murphy

=== Season 2 (2011) ===
No. overall	No. in season	Title	Directed by	Written by	Original release date	Prod. code	U.S. viewers (millions)
11	1	"The Mr. Himdependent Episode"	Alfonso Ribeiro	Ali LeRoi	January 5, 2011	201	2.6
Nick lands a job as a regional TV station's sports anchor. Elsewhere, Suzanne's ex-husband pushes the idea of paying less child support, creating tension in Suzanne and Nick's marriage. Terrence asks Suzanne and Gigi to plan a friend's bachelor party.
12	2	"The We Ain't Going Out Like That Episode"	Ali LeRoi	Adam Lorenzo	January 5, 2011	202	2.3
Nick and Suzanne gear up for a special date night, but Nick becomes bothered when she plans every single detail. Meanwhile, Lindsey and Kevin rummage through an old box of videotapes and discover the 1987–93 sitcom A Different World.
13	3	"The Oh No She Di-in't Episode"	Ali LeRoi	Antonia March & Jacqueline McKinley	January 12, 2011	203	2.4
Suzanne grows jealous of Nick's pretty young field producer. Elsewhere, Gigi falls for a man, who has children, so she enlists Kevin and Lindsey to help her better relate to kids. Guest Star: Sandra "Pepa" Denton
14	4	"The Nick's Manny-Pedi Episode"	Ali LeRoi	Andrew Orenstein	January 12, 2011	208	2.4
Suzanne infiltrates Nick's night with the boys, so he retaliates by crashing her all-lady spa getaway. Guest Stars: Toccara Jones and Sherrod Small
15	5	"The Gold Party Episode"	Alfonso Ribeiro	Luisa Leschin	January 19, 2011	205	3.6
When Nick suspects that Suzanne's wedding ring is fake, he sets out behind her back to replace it with a real one. Meanwhile, a panic-stricken Suzanne believes she's lost the ring. Marilyn arranges a cash for gold party at the house.
16	6	"The Boy Has Style Episode"	Ali LeRoi	Antonia March & Jacqueline McKinley	January 19, 2011	206	3.8
Lindsey develops a crush on a stylish boy at school, but Suzanne seriously believes that he is gay. Meanwhile, comical mix-ups hound Suzanne when she tries to deliver a package.
17	7	"The Man and the Bragging Snafu Episode"	Alfonso Ribeiro	Kenya Barris	January 26, 2011	207	3.2
Nick and Suzanne contemplate enrolling their children in a private school, but they soon grow disillusioned by the admissions process. Meanwhile, Kevin lands a modeling gig, but he lacks model behavior when he demands more money. Guest star: Wayne Brady
18	8	"The Suzanne Theft Auto Episode"	Alfonso Ribeiro	Adam Lorenzo	January 26, 2011	204	3.0
Suzanne becomes overly consumed with Kevin's science project. Elsewhere, Lindsey revs up for driving lessons, only to emerge as a suspect when her mother's car is scratched, when trying to drive it somewhere. Guest star: Michael Blackson
19	9	"The Despicable E Episode"	Ali LeRoi	Lamont Ferrell	February 2, 2011	209	3.2
Lindsey's romantic attentions turn to a young celebrity DJ, who only neglects her in return. Elsewhere, Suzanne teaches Kevin the art of doing laundry. Guest stars: Michael Strahan and Lil' JJ
20	10	"The She Got Game Night Episode"	Alfonso Ribeiro	Regina Y. Hicks	February 2, 2011	210	2.9
Suzanne organizes a traditional game night at the house, but the evening turns comically dicey due to a prank and a bet between Nick and Kevin. Guest stars: Toccara Jones and David Rasche
21	11	"The Valentine's Day Episode"	Alfonso Ribeiro	Jacqueline McKinley; Antonia March	February 9, 2011	211	3.8
Nick flops in his efforts to help Kevin with Valentine's Day at school.
22	12	"The Parent Teacher Trap Episode"	Alfonso Ribeiro	Jason M. Palmer	February 9, 2011	212	2.7
Suzanne serves on a committee at Kevin's school, but complications arise when her fellow female members disrespect her, but adore Nick.
23	13	"The Whose Card Is It Anyway Episode"	Ali LeRoi	Royale Watkins	February 16, 2011	213	2.5
When Nick misleads Suzanne about spending a gift card, the couple appear before a TV judge to sort out the truth. Guest stars: Sinbad and Adele Givens
24	14	"The Suzanne Gets One-Upped Episode"	Ali LeRoi	Royale Watkins	February 16, 2011	214	3.8
Nick plans a belated surprise honeymoon for Suzanne, but keeping it a secret causes complications. Elsewhere, Lindsey helps Kevin with his homework. Guest star: Laila Ali
25	15	"The First .45 Episode"	Alfonso Ribeiro	Arthur Harris	February 23, 2011	215	N/A
When looking for something for Suzanne, Kevin finds a gun in the closet and plays with it.
26	16	"The Take Your Kids to Work Day Episode"	Ali LeRoi	Luisa Leschin	February 23, 2011	216	N/A
Suzanne takes Lindsey to work with her.
27	17	"The Fall of Troy Episode"	Ali LeRoi	Jason M. Palmer	March 2, 2011	217	N/A
Kevin stands up for Troy as a bully, Jason starts picking on him as Kevin starts hanging out with Jason and when he is about to beat up Troy, Kevin stands up for him when is about to punch Jason but does and he gets a black eye and they get along and play video games in the end. Guest star: Bobb'e J. Thompson
28	18	"The Pole Dance Episode"	Alfonso Ribeiro	Royale Watkins	March 2, 2011	218	N/A
Suzanne shows Nick that she is the best pole dancer on the block.
29	19	"The Disney Episode"	Alfonso Ribeiro	Antonia March & Jacqueline McKinley	March 9, 2011	219	N/A
Nick surprised the family by telling them that they're going to Walt Disney World in Florida. Suzanne, on the other hand, had a retreat to do from work with Gigi, so she couldn't go but was later planned to do the retreat in Disney World. Nick and Martin did a golf tournament in Disney World with Anthony Anderson to prove that Nick is a better golf player than Anthony. Guest star: Anthony Anderson
30	20	"The Salsa Episode"	Alfonso Ribeiro	Antonia March & Jacqueline McKinley	March 9, 2011	220	N/A
Annoyed that Nick and Suzanne never do anything together, Suzanne signs them up for Salsa dancing classes but gets upset when Nick turns out to be better than her. Meanwhile Kevin shows Lindsey how to get exactly what she wants. Guest star: Tony Dovolani
31	21	"The Nick Gets Jealous Episode"	Ali LeRoi	Jason M. Palmer	March 16, 2011	221	N/A
Nick asks Suzanne to help plan a children's charity event. Guest star: Jaleel White
32	22	"The Test Taker Episode"	Alfonso Ribeiro	Kenya Barris	March 16, 2011	222	N/A
Kevin helps Frankie study for a test, but Frankie bribes him to take the test for him.
33	23	"The Compatibility Test Episode"	Alfonso Ribeiro	Michele Marburger & Kevin Marburger	March 23, 2011	223	N/A
Suzanne meets a relationship expert and becomes convinced that she and Nick are having compatibility issues. Guest star: Leon Robinson
34	24	"The Good Cop, Bad Cop Episode"	Alfonso Ribeiro	Royale Watkins	March 23, 2011	224	N/A
Suzanne is tired of being the bad cop as she is tired of Nick being the good cop and saying yes to the kids when they ask him to do something or for money as Nick and Suzanne switch places as Suzanne starts saying yes to the kids and Nick has to say no to them. when Lindsey goes off to a Bruno Mars concert with her friends and she gets in trouble and Nick and Suzanne stop with their drama and when Kevin asks Suzanne to make something, she says no and he says isn't fair and she chases him.
35	25	"The Mr. Almost Episode"	Alfonso Ribeiro	Owen Smith & Jason M. Palmer	March 30, 2011	225	N/A
When Nick happens upon an old college pal, the meeting gives rise to a business plan that involves a sports star and an energy drink. The results, however, aren't so bubbly. Guest stars: Deion Sanders and Heavy D
36	26	"The Play Date Episode"	Alfonso Ribeiro	Kenya Barris	March 30, 2011	226	N/A
Suzanne and Nick go out with another couple, but the double date soon fizzles when an accusation flies.
37	27	"The Lindsey Gets High Episode"	Ali LeRoi	Ali LeRoi	April 6, 2011	227	N/A
Lindsey gets high when her friend gives her a drug and everything changes even her family and her father as Todd Bridges takes her what happens to people when they get high on drugs.
38	28	"The Liar, Liar Episode"	Alfonso Ribeiro	Luisa Leschin	April 6, 2011	228	N/A
Suzanne begins to force everyone in the family to tell the truth at all times after she catches Nick in a lie.
39	29	"The Fight Party Episode"	Alfonso Ribeiro	Royale Watkins	April 13, 2011	229	1.6
Nick's boxing match party unexpectedly takes over the family room on the same night Suzanne's book group is meeting in the living room. Guest star: Tichina Arnold
40	30	"The Nick's Kid Episode"	Ali LeRoi	Ali LeRoi	April 13, 2011	230	1.7
Suzanne thinks Nick has a kid from a past relationship as he does everything, Nick likes, eats and wear as Nick says he is not his son as he takes a DNA test and he is not the father. Guest star: Kandi Burruss
41	31	"The Kevin Gets a Commercial Episode"	Richard Correll	Owen Smith	April 27, 2011	233	N/A
Kevin auditions for a commercial for the mall burger joint Up and Down Burger and ends up being replaced by a famous kid actor that looks just like him and Gigi wants to be in it and she ends up getting to be in it, but with a cameo appearance in the background. Guest star: Michael Blackson
42	32	"The Suzanne's Surprise Party Episode"	Ali LeRoi	Regina Y. Hicks	April 27, 2011	234	N/A
Nick and the kids throw a birthday party for Suzanne as she never had one.
43	33	"The Mother's Day Episode"	Ali LeRoi	Michele Marburger & Kevin Marburger	May 4, 2011	235	N/A
Suzanne and Marilyn convene for a spa weekend for Mother's Day, but friction soon mounts between the two
44	34	"The Lindsey Goes Vegan Episode"	Richard Correll	Jason M. Palmer & Kenya Barris	May 4, 2011	236	N/A
Lindsey becomes a vegan as Nick and Suzanne thinks she is doing it for some boy as she disagrees as Suzanne kinds of joins her as Suzanne becomes weak and stops but Lindsey keeps being vegan and even starts dressing like one and in the end, they find she was doing it for a Jamaican vegan boy and she stops being vegan and gets her favorite meal from Up and Down Burger.

=== Season 3 (2012–13) ===
Are We There Yet? returned for a third and final season on September 17, 2012.

No. overall	No. in season	Title	Directed by	Written by	Original release date	Prod. code	U.S. viewers (millions)
45	1	"The Staycation Episode"	Alfonso Ribeiro	Adam Lorenzo	September 17, 2012	231	1.54
Nick tries to give his family the best vacation ever but things do not go well at all.
46	2	"The Thief Episode"	Ali LeRoi	Kristi Korzec	September 18, 2012	232	1.39
Lindsey steals $60 from Gigi's wallet and turns back around and blames Kevin for it.
47	3	"The Bad Dream Episode"	Ali LeRoi	Adam Lorenzo	September 19, 2012	301	1.71
Kevin and Nick go to an R-rated movie, but Kevin has nightmares from seeing it.
48	4	"The 22 Episode"	Ali LeRoi	Andrew Orenstein	September 20, 2012	302	1.34
The family oversleeps on the day Lindsey is scheduled to sing the national anthem at a baseball game. Meanwhile, Kevin gets sick.
49	5	"The Cooking Episode"	Lev L. Spiro	Antonia March & Jacqueline McKinley	September 21, 2012	303	1.19
Nick and Suzanne go head to head in the kitchen when Nick says cooking is "easy" and Suzanne challenges him to a family cooking competition.
50	6	"The Regift Episode"	Ali LeRoi	Antonia March & Jacqueline McKinley	September 24, 2012	304	1.64
Suzanne tries to return an unlikely gift from Marilyin with Nick not knowing. Guest Star: Rickey Smiley
51	7	"The Suzanne Gets Arrested Episode"	Lev L. Spiro	Jason M. Palmer	September 25, 2012	305	1.25
Suzanne gets arrested and decides to change her stubborn ways. Guest Star: Joan Rivers
52	8	"The Second Black President Episode"	Lev L. Spiro	Royale Watkins	September 26, 2012	306	1.99
Kevin tries to run for seventh-grade class president, but he is torn about how to run his campaign. Guest Star: Ice Cube
53	9	"The Green Episode"	Ali LeRoi	Adam Lorenzo	September 27, 2012	307	1.46
The family tries become environmental friendly with each other but chaos ensures.
54	10	"The Father's Day Episode"	Ali LeRoi	Jason M. Palmer	September 28, 2012	308	2.00
Frank is an uninvited guest on Nick's Father's Day trip, but the two bond during an elevator stoppage. Guest star: Charlie Murphy as Frank
55	11	"The My First Job Episode"	Reginald Hudlin	Owen Smith	October 1, 2012	309	1.13
Lindsey gets her first job at a fast food restaurant, but soon gets fired when she gives out free food.
56	12	"The Tiger Dad Episode"	Ali LeRoi	Antonia March & Jacqueline McKinley	October 2, 2012	310	1.42
Nick tries to become a more effective parent, so he pushes Kevin and Lindsey to become better people.
57	13	"The Expensive Purse Episode"	Reginald Hudlin	Ali LeRoi	October 3, 2012	311	1.50
Against Nick's wishes, Suzanne buys an expensive purse and Nick becomes suspicious about it, so he uses her guilt to his advantage.
58	14	"The Master of Ceremonies Episode"	Reginald Hudlin	Michele Marburger & Kevin Marburger	October 4, 2012	312	1.09
Suzanne becomes the subject to Nick's joke-off, and Suzanne retaliates against him.
59	15	"The Control Issue Episode"	Ted Lange	Luisa Leschin	October 5, 2012	313	1.06
When Nick makes a point that Suzanne is too controlling of the family, Suzanne backs off the issue and later the family realizes that her controlling ways are just what they need.
60	16	"The Ghost Dog Episode"	Royale Watkins	Reginald Hudlin	October 8, 2012	314	1.01
Nick, Suzanne, and Kevin pull pranks on each other, but their addiction leads to a near-death experience. Guest Star: Jackée Harry
61	17	"The Lemon Squeeze Episode"	Ted Lange	Antonia March & Jacqueline McKinley	October 9, 2012	315	1.60
Gigi uses an adequate exercise when the family refuses to stop fighting with each other.
62	18	"The Mother's-in-Law Episode"	Reginald Hudlin	Owen Smith	October 10, 2012	316	1.77
Suzanne's overprotective mother arrives and causes tension between her and Nick when she questions Nick's abilities as a husband. Guest Star: Lynn Whitfield
63	19	"The Tit for Tat Episode"	Ted Lange	Luisa Leschin	October 11, 2012	317	1.97
A newly hired, attractive woman threatens Nick's job at the station.
64	20	"The Quarantine Episode"	Reginald Hudlin	Kristi Korzec	October 12, 2012	318	N/A
Marilyn comes down with a dangerous disease when she comes back home from Mexico, putting the entire family under quarantine.
65	21	"The V.I.P. Tickets Episode"	Ted Lange	Michele Marburger & Kevin Marburger	October 15, 2012	319	N/A
Suzanne becomes furious with Nick when Nick decides to invite Martin to a baseball game before she gets invited.
66	22	"The Lindsey Dances Episode"	Ted Lange	Antonia March & Jacqueline McKinley	October 16, 2012	320	N/A
Lindsey auditions to dance for a famous rapper's music video, but she later backs out after meeting with the powerful, demanding choreographer. Guest Star: Laurieann Gibson
67	23	"The Career Day Episode"	Ted Lange	Royale Watkins	October 17, 2012	321	N/A
For Career Day, Nick serves as a guest speaker for Kevin's class, but his message ultimately confuses Kevin's classmates.
68	24	"The House Sitter's Episode"	Ted Lange	Michele Marburger & Kevin Marburger	October 18, 2012	322	N/A
Nick and Suzanne's next door's neighbors become irresponsible house sitters. Guest Star: Tempestt Bledsoe, Darryl M. Bell
69	25	"The Nick Gets Promoted Episode"	Ted Lange	Jason M. Palmer	October 19, 2012	323	N/A
Nick anxiously awaits for a promotion, but he works hard to prove that he got what it takes and works with a colleague who is arrogant.
70	26	"The Big Loan Episode"	Ted Lange	Antonia March & Jacqueline McKinley	October 22, 2012	324	N/A
Lindsey works with Nick at his station, but she doesn't take her job very seriously, forcing Nick to make a tough decision. Suzanne wants to buy Nick a surprise birthday gift, so she takes out a loan from Marilyn.
71	27	"The Family Portrait Episode"	Oz Scott	Luisa Leschin	October 23, 2012	325	N/A
Suzanne gathers everyone up for a family portrait. Guest Star: Miguel A. Núñez Jr
72	28	"The Nick Hosts a Telethon Episode"	Ali LeRoi	Adam Lorenzo	October 24, 2012	326	N/A
Nick host a fund-raiser for charity. Elsewhere, Suzanne tangles with a wealthy client.
73	29	"The Nick Gets an Assistant Episode"	Ali LeRoi	Kristi Korzec	October 25, 2012	327	N/A
Nick is coerced into hiring an assistant, but the newbie gets too close to Nick's family and friends. Suzanne gets sick. Guest star: Russell Peters
74	30	"The Silent Treatment Episode"	Oz Scott	Royale Watkins	October 26, 2012	328	N/A
Nick and Suzanne get into an argument and refuse to talk to each other.
75	31	"The Kwandanegaba Children's Fund Episode"	Oz Scott	Leo Benvenuti & Steve Rudnick	October 29, 2012	329	N/A
Lindsey and Kevin give to a charity, but Nick decides to step in when the charity keeps asking for more and more money. Guest Star: Michael Blackson
76	32	"The Blockbuster Movie Episode"	Ali LeRoi	Owen Smith	October 30, 2012	330	N/A
Nick and Suzanne plan to attend a high-profile movie blockbuster, but their busy schedules create mighty complications.
77	33	"The Pocket Dial Episode"	Jerry Levine	Jason M. Palmer	October 31, 2012	331	N/A
Nick retaliates after he overhears Suzanne revealing personal information to Gigi.
78	34	"The Secret Episode"	Jerry Levine	Antonia March & Jacqueline McKinley	November 1, 2012	332	N/A
The spread of certain secrets ruin a couple newfound romance. Guest Star: Bill Bellamy
79	35	"The Life Insurance Episode"	Oz Scott	Royale Watkins	November 2, 2012	333	N/A
Nick and Suzanne consider going for life insurance.
80	36	"The Hypertension Episode"	Oz Scott	Adam Lorenzo	November 9, 2012	334	N/A
Nick discovers he has high-blood pressure and looks for ways to reduce stress in his life.
81	37	"The Satchel Pagge Episode"	Oz Scott	Leo Benvenuti & Steve Rudnick	November 12, 2012	335	N/A
Nick hopes to hire a golden-voiced man for voice-over work; Suzanne misplaces Gigi's expensive cashmere sweater. Guest Star: Reg E. Cathey, Ernest Thomas
82	38	"The Cyrano Episode"	Jerry Levine	Andrew Orenstein	November 12, 2012	336	N/A
Romantic complications ensue when Nick helps a shy colleague improve his love life. Meanwhile, a pinkeye epidemic keeps Lindsey away from school.
83	39	"The Identity Theft Episode"	Ali LeRoi	Jason M. Palmer	November 13, 2012	401	N/A
Nick thinks an anonymous person has stolen his identity; Suzanne leaves for the week to attend her childhood friend's wedding; and Marilyn set out to teach the kids a life lesson.
84	40	"The Inappropriate Website Episode"	Alfonso Ribeiro	Owen Smith	November 13, 2012	402	N/A
Nick accidentally pulls up an adult website at work, offending a female colleague. Meanwhile, Suzanne waits at home for a new couch to be delivered, and Lindsey prepares for a Shakespeare test. Guest stars: Darrell Hammond, Horatio Sanz, Ellen Muth, Judy Gold
85	41	"The Open Mic Gaffe Episode"	Alfonso Ribeiro	Michele Marburger & Kevin Marburger	November 14, 2012	403	N/A
Nick don't recognize his microphone is on and it insults a colleague at the studio; Marilyn learns the life of the Internet with help from the Kids.
86	42	"The Timeshare Episode"	Ted Lange	Luisa Leschin	November 14, 2012	404	N/A
Marilyn dates a younger man, but Nick raises his suspicions about her new love's true intentions; Kevin breaks his arm.
87	43	"The Thanksgiving Episode"	Ted Lange	Antonia March & Jacqueline McKinley	November 14, 2012	405	N/A
Friends and extended family gather for a Thanksgiving dinner, but Suzanne forgets the turkey. Guest stars: Cindy Williams, Lynn Whitfield, Obba Babatundé, Jamie Hector
88	44	"The Sex Symbol Episode"	Alfonso Ribeiro	Kristi Korzec	November 15, 2012	406	N/A
Nick is voted as Seattle's sexiest sportscaster, but his newfound celebrity has downsides. Guest stars: Darrell Hammond, Horatio Sanz
89	45	"The Insignificant Anniversary Episode"	Alfonso Ribeiro	Kenya Barris	November 15, 2012	407	0.96
Nick forgets an anniversary. Meanwhile, the children star in Internet videos wearing superhero costumes while doling out advice to users.
90	46	"The Long Con Episode"	Alfonso Ribeiro	Leo Benvenuti & Steve Rudnick	November 16, 2012	408	N/A
Kevin buys an inexpensive African mask at a yard sale, but the item may actually be a very valuable piece of art. Elsewhere, Lindsey prepares for a big date with her crush and receives dating advice from the gang.
91	47	"The Bigg Box Klub Episode"	Alfonso Ribeiro	Story by : Adrienne LeRoi; Teleplay by : Ali LeRoi	November 16, 2012	409	N/A
The gang shop until they drop when they get a membership at a discount bulk store. Meanwhile, Lindsey enters a speed-texting contest.
92	48	"The Black Friday Episode"	Ted Lange	Michele Marburger & Kevin Marburger	November 19, 2012	410	N/A
Comical chaos ensues when the gang waits in line to shop at a department store on Black Friday. Here, Kevin anticipates buying a new video game, Lindsey meets a boy, relationship problems plague Martin and Terrence hopes to buy toys for charity. Guest star: Sherrod Small
93	49	"The Blackout Episode"	Ali LeRoi	Jacqueline McKinley & Antonia March	November 19, 2012	411	N/A
A guys' night out goes awry, resulting in lost recollections due to alcohol-fueled blackouts and the disappearance of Nick's wedding ring. Guest stars: Laila Ali, Sherrod Small
94	50	"The Wrong Way Episode"	Ali LeRoi	Jason M. Palmer	November 20, 2012	412	N/A
Nick attends his high-school reunion but must face an embarrassing incident from his past. Meanwhile, Lindsey throws a party. Guest star: Kevin Farley
95	51	"The Concussion Episode"	Keesha Sharp	Dave Bizgia	November 20, 2012	413	N/A
Nick suffers a concussion. Guest star: Darrell Hammond
96	52	"The Bucket List Episode"	Ali LeRoi	Antonia March & Jacqueline McKinley	November 21, 2012	414	N/A
Nick worries about his mortality and creates a bucket list featuring overly dangerous activities. Meanwhile, Kevin and Troy launch an underground candy ring at school.
97	53	"The Spelling Bee Episode"	Ali LeRoi	Owen Smith	November 21, 2012	415	N/A
Nick meets a famous actor, who shadows Nick in preparation for a role. Meanwhile, Kevin gears up for a spelling bee. Guest star: Charlie Murphy
98	54	"The Kleptomaniac Episode"	Ali LeRoi	Luisa Leschin	November 22, 2012	416	N/A
Nick is enlisted to host a charity walkathon. Meanwhile, Marilyn's bracelet goes missing, and the children train for their participation in the charity walk.
99	55	"The Hand on a House Episode"	Ali LeRoi	Jason M. Palmer	November 23, 2012	417	N/A
Nick and others enter a contest to win a house. Guest Star: Billy Ray Cyrus
100	56	"The Good Day Seattle Episode"	Ali LeRoi	Michele Marburger & Kevin Marburger	March 1, 2013	418	1.90
A new morning show is launched at the station, but Nick must co-host it with a self-serving reality star. Meanwhile, Marilyn moves in with the family. Note: This is the 100th episode. This is the series finale and the only episode of the show to air in 2013.
