= Dan Kolsrud =

American film producer

- Born: USA.
- Other name: Daniel P. Kolsrud
- Occupation: Film producer

Dan Kolsrud (d. 2024) was an American film producer. The movies he worked on were nominated 24 times at the Academy Award and won 3 Oscars.

== Biography ==
Dan Kolsrud was a 1970 graduate of the University of North Carolina Department of Radio, Television and Motion Pictures. After graduating, he worked in the television industry on the East coast for a few years, and then moved to Hollywood to work in movie production.

He was Executive Vice President Worldwide Theatrical Physical Production for Metro-Goldwyn-Mayer from 2008 - 2011.

== Filmography ==
He was producer for all films unless otherwise noted.

=== Film ===
Year	Film	Credit
1983	Something Wicked This Way Comes	Associate producer
1990	Impulse	Executive producer
1992	Memoirs of an Invisible Man	
1993	Falling Down	Co-producer
1993	Grumpy Old Men	Executive producer
1994	Richie Rich	Executive producer
1995	Seven	Executive producer
1997	L.A. Confidential	Executive producer
1999	Mystery, Alaska	Executive producer
1999	Bicentennial Man	Executive producer
2002	Serving Sara	Executive producer
2003	Daddy Day Care	Executive producer
2004	13 Going on 30	Executive producer
2005	Are We There Yet?	
2005	The Fog	Executive producer
2008	Role Models	Executive producer
2009	Cirque du Freak: The Vampire's Assistant	Executive producer
2013	Identity Thief	Executive producer

Second unit director or assistant director

Year	Film	Role
1977	Slap Shot	DGA trainee
1978	I Wanna Hold Your Hand	Second assistant director
1978	Same Time, Next Year	Second assistant director
1980	Coal Miner's Daughter	First assistant director
1980	Xanadu	First assistant director
1981	Ghost Story	First assistant director
1983	Something Wicked This Way Comes	First assistant director
1983	Going Berserk	First assistant director
1983	Gorky Park	First assistant director
1985	The Goonies	First assistant director
1986	Top Gun	First assistant director
1986	Howard the Duck	First assistant director
1987	Spaceballs	Assistant director
1987	Like Father Like Son	First assistant director
1990	Men Don't Leave	First assistant director

Miscellaneous crew

Year	Film	Role
2008	Valkyrie	Executive VP of production
2010	Hot Tub Time Machine	Executive VP of production
2011	Zookeeper	Executive VP of production
2011	The Cabin in the Woods	Executive VP of production
2012	Red Dawn	Executive VP of production

Production manager

Year	Film	Role
1990	Impulse	Unit production manager
1993	Grumpy Old Men	Unit production manager

Thanks

Year	Film	Role
1981	Continental Divide	Special thanks
2008	Smother	Thanks

=== Television ===
Second unit director or assistant director

Year	Title	Role	Notes	Other notes
1977	Red Alert	Second assistant director	Television film	
1977	Exo-Man	Second assistant director	Television film	Uncredited
1977	Escape from Bogen County	Second assistant director	Television film	
1979	Fast Friends	Second assistant director	Television film	
1979	The Legend of the Golden Gun	Second assistant director	Television film	
1984	Lace	Assistant director		
1984	Fatal Vision	Assistant director		
