= Tomcats (2001 film) =

2001 film by Gregory Poirier

- Theatrical release poster
- Directed by: Gregory Poirier
- Written by: Gregory Poirier
- Produced by: Paul Kurta; Tony Ludwig; Alan Riche
- Starring: Jerry O'Connell; Shannon Elizabeth; Jake Busey; Horatio Sanz; Jaime Pressly
- Cinematography: Charles Minsky
- Edited by: Harry Keramidas
- Music by: David Kitay
- Production company: Revolution Studios
- Distributed by: Sony Pictures Releasing (Note: Distributed under the Columbia Pictures label.)
- Release date: March 30, 2001
- Running time: 92 minutes
- Country: United States
- Language: English
- Budget: $11 million
- Box office: $23.4 million

Tomcats is a 2001 American sex comedy film written and directed by Gregory Poirier. It stars Jerry O'Connell, Shannon Elizabeth, and Jake Busey. This film also features Dakota Fanning in her film acting debut. It is the first film produced by Revolution Studios. The film was released by Sony Pictures Releasing under the Columbia Pictures label on March 30, 2001 to negative reviews, and the film grossed $23.4 million against an $11 million budget.

== Plot ==
A group of men, Michael Delaney, Kyle Brenner, Steve and others, are talking before the wedding ceremony of one of their friends. They agree to a pact whereby they will all invest in a fund that only the last bachelor will inherit.

Michael goes to Las Vegas years later with Steve and his girlfriend. After going back to their room, he mistakenly thinks she wants him to say "I love you". He panics and kicks her out of the room and she dumps him. He goes on a bender and picks up a sultry redhead who encourages him to gamble at the roulette table. He goes on an amazing run of bad luck, losing everything and taking out credit from the casino. In the end, the casino intervenes and he is summoned to meet the pit boss Carlos. Carlos informs Michael how serious the trouble he is in and what will happen if he fails to repay the debt.

Michael realizes that he and Kyle are now the last men standing and stand to inherit the entire fund, which has swelled to an enormous amount. He approaches Kyle and learns that the latter is wealthy and a jerk. He decides that his only option is to set Kyle up so that Michael can inherit the fund. He learns on a drunken night that Kyle has only ever loved one woman, a lady named Natalie, whom he met at Steve's wife Tricia's sister's wedding.

Michael approaches Steve and Tricia and finds out where Natalie is. Unfortunately, they neglect to tell him that Natalie is a police detective. Natalie is working undercover as a streetwalker when Michael finds her and he inadvertently gets himself arrested for solicitation. During interrogation, he admits everything and is eventually released.

Natalie visits him and agrees to go in with his plan on the basis that she gets half the money. He finds out that Kyle's memory of Natalie and his night together left out some important details, notably that, when Natalie woke up, Kyle had bolted, leaving her with a bag of quarters to get a cab home.

Michael and Natalie decide to spend time together investigating Kyle in order to ensure their plan works. It all appears to be working until Michael realizes he is falling in love with Natalie. Natalie too is falling for Michael, but decides to go ahead with marrying Kyle. During the bachelor party, Kyle informs Michael that he has no intention of quitting womanizing and believes Natalie to be the perfect stay-at-home wife.

Before Michael can act and prevent the wedding, he is knocked unconscious by a bowling ball. He wakes up and discovers that his clothes are missing. He grabs some clothing from an unconscious stripper and tries to run to the civic hall to prevent the marriage. After a number of misadventures, Michael finally arrives, but learns that he is too late and Kyle has already married Natalie. He leaves, somewhat dejected.

Michael goes on to claim the fund and thereby settles his debt with Carlos. He later bumps into Kyle who is on a date with another girl and punches him as he believes Kyle to be cheating on Natalie. Kyle beats up Michael and then discloses that he has split with Natalie. On their wedding night, she knocked him unconscious and when he woke up, he found a bag of quarters. Michael runs off to find Natalie and finds her again working undercover. He proposes that they date and he gives up his tomcat ways. The pair ultimately marry. Kyle ends up with the librarian Michael was with earlier.

== Cast ==
- Jerry O'Connell as Michael Delaney
- Shannon Elizabeth as Officer Natalie Parker
- Jake Busey as Kyle Brenner
- Horatio Sanz as Steve
- Jaime Pressly as Tricia
- Bernie Casey as Officer Hurley
- David Ogden Stiers as Dr. Crawford
- Travis Fine as Jan
- Heather Stephens as Jill the librarian
- Julia Schultz as Shelby
- Candice Michelle as stripper
- Rachel Sterling as Cherry
- Marisa Petroro (credited as Marisa Parker) as Maria
- David St. James as Priest
- Dakota Fanning as Little Girl in Park
- Bill Maher as Carlos

== Production ==
In March 2000, it was reported that Joe Roth was in negotiations to acquire Tomcats, a script to be written and directed by Gregory Poirier, which would be the first film from Roth's unnamed forthcoming company. Shannon Elizabeth and Jerry O'Connell were both reportedly in talks to star in the film. The following month, Jake Busey was in final negotiations to play the third lead.

== Reception ==
=== Box office ===
Tomcats debuted alongside Spy Kids, Someone Like You, and The Tailor of Panama. The film grossed $6.4 million in its opening weekend in the United States and Canada, debuting in fourth place. Overall, the film grossed $13.6 million in the United States and Canada, contributing to a $23.4 million worldwide total.

=== Critical response ===
On the review aggregator website Rotten Tomatoes, 13% of 75 critics' reviews are positive, with an average rating of 3.4/10. The website's consensus reads: "Why even bother? You already know if you're going to see it or not." Metacritic, which uses a weighted average, assigned the film a score of 15 out of 100, based on 19 critics, indicating "overwhelming dislike". Audiences polled by CinemaScore gave the film an average grade of "C+" on an A+ to F scale.

Peter Travers of Rolling Stone said "Tomcats is laced with such rampant misogyny that the laughs stick in your throat."

The New York Times said, "The film is enthusiastically vulgar but not particularly funny, perhaps because it too often loses the distinction between gross-out humor and the merely gross."
