= Pedro Miguel Arce =

Nicaraguan actor (1976–2022)

- Publicity Photo of Pedro Miguel Arce
- Born: 17 June 1976; Managua, Nicaragua
- Died: 9 December 2022 (aged 46); Toronto, Ontario, Canada
- Occupation: Actor
- Years active: 2001–2022

Pedro Miguel Arce (17 June 1976 – 9 December 2022) was a Nicaraguan film and television actor based in Canada. He was known for his roles in Land of the Dead and Get Rich or Die Tryin', as well as television appearances in CSI: Miami and How I Met Your Mother.

== Early life ==
Born and raised in Managua, Nicaragua, Pedro moved to Miami, Florida, for a few years, then he settled in Toronto, Ontario, Canada. While there Pedro surpassed others in high school football where he was captain for both the Neil McNeil Maroons and the Cedarbrae Colts. After graduation he enrolled to University of Toronto where he’d join the Varsity Blues National Championship football team. To improve his hand & foot speed for football, Pedro took Jeet Kune Do classes. Enjoying the fighting arts more, he then decided to retire from football and pursue a career in entertainment.

== Career ==
Pedro moved back to the United States and lived in Los Angeles, California. He appeared in television commercials, and appeared in such shows as CSI: Miami, and How I Met Your Mother. He also featured in films such as Walt Disney's Confessions of a Teenage Drama Queen, with Lindsay Lohan, George A. Romero's Land of the Dead, Get Rich or Die Tryin' with 50 Cent and Ice Cube's Are We Done Yet?. He also enjoyed doing stand up comedy. He participated in numerous open mics and comedy events.

== Personal life and death ==
"I am currently doing a lot of writing. I have a lot of ideas in my head, regarding different things that I like to do. I am trying to get as much of my writing done as possible. I've got a couple things completed and I am just trying to get them and bring them out to fruition. I wouldn't mind working on all sides of the camera, in front of the camera and behind the camera to do some filmmaking."

Pedro always cared very deeply for his friends and family. He spent his life making people laugh and making sure everyone around him was always smiling. He lived out loud, brightening every room he walked into and always sticking up for those who need it. He died in Toronto on 9 December 2022, at the age of 46 following a battle with cancer.

== Filmography ==
- Fall: The Price of Silence (2001) - Samoan Body Guard
- True Blue (2001) - Bouncer
- Elvis Gratton 3: Le retour d'Elvis Wong (2004) - Elvis Wong
- Confessions of a Teenage Drama Queen (2004) - Ticket Taker
- Get Rich or Die Tryin' (2005) - Cash Counting Guard
- Land of the Dead (2005) - Pillsbury
- The Red Balloon (2006) - St. Peter
- Bunny Whipped (2006) - Security Guard
- Are We Done Yet? (2007) - Georgie Pulu
- Step Brothers (2008) - Hard Wired
- Fast Glass (2008) - Punisher
- Krews (2008) - Guatemalan Gang Member
- Polar (2019) - Pedro Gonzalez Gonzales
- Queen of the Morning Calm (2019) - Chico
- The Christmas Setup (2020) - Jimmy Spencer
- Akilla's Escape (2020) - Rodrigo
- Life in a Year (2020) - Security Guard
- The End of Sex (2022) - Jory
- Last County (2024) - Deputy Lee Hargood; Posthumous release
- Stealing Vows (TBA) - Arthur; Posthumous release
- The Bounce (TBA; Television film) - Camera Guy; Posthumous release

=== Stunts ===
- Exit Wounds (2001) - (stunt double: sumo)

== Television appearances ==
| Television series | Information |
|---|---|
| Incorporated: Role: Semo; 2016-2017; 6 episodes | |
| The Strain: Role: Felix; Credit as: Pedro Miguel Arce; Season, Episode: Season 1, Episode 4,5,6,7; TV Aired: 3 August 2014 | |
| Las Vegas: Role: Bar Tender; Credit as: Pedro Miguel Arce; Season, Episode: Season 3, Episode 8; Episodes Title: "Bold, Beautiful & Blue"; TV Aired: 14 November 2005; DVD Released: 12 September 2006 | |
| How I Met Your Mother: Role: Dana; Credit as: Pedro Miguel Arce; Season, Episode: Season 1, Episode 3; Episodes Title: "Sweet Taste of Liberty"; TV Aired: 3 October 2005; DVD Released: 21 November 2006 | |
| Strong Medicine: Role: Bouncer; Credit as: Pedro Miguel Arce; Season, Episode: Season 6, Episode 7; Episodes Title: "Paternity Test"; TV Aired: 7 August 2005; DVD Released: TBA | |
| Jake in Progress: Role: Bodyguard #1; Credit as: Pedro Miguel Arce; Season, Episode: Season 1, Episode 5; Episodes Title: "Sign Language"; TV Aired: 24 March 2005; DVD Released: TBA | |
| CSI: Miami: Role: Leon Caldwell; Credit as: Pedro Miguel Arce; Season, Episode: Season 3, Episode 7; Episodes Title: "Crime Wave"; TV Aired: 8 November 2004; DVD Released: 22 November 2005 | |
| Ned's Declassified School Survival Guide: Role: Sumo Cookie; Credit as: Pedro Miguel Arce; Season, Episode: Season 1, Episode 7; Episodes Title: "Rumors & Photo Day"; TV Aired: 7 November 2004; DVD Released: TBA | |
| Mutant X: Role: Troy; Credit as: Pedro Miguel Arce; Season, Episode: Season 3, Episode 10; Episodes Title: "List of Mutant X episodes#Season 3|Brother's Keeper"; TV Aired: 19 January 2004; DVD Released: TBA | |
| Street Time: Role: Doorman/Bouncer; Credit as: Pedro Miguel Arce; Season, Episode: Season 1, Episode 6; Episodes Title: "Lesser Evils"; TV Aired: 21 July 2002; Role: Bartender; Credit as: Pedro Miguel Arce; Season, Episode: Season 1, Episode 5; Episodes Title: "Respect"; TV Aired: 14 July 2002; Role: Dorrman; Credit as: Pedro Miguel Arce; Season, Episode: Season 1, Episode 4; Episodes Title: "Above Suspicion"; TV Aired: 7 July 2002; DVD Released: TBA | |
| Relic Hunter: Role: Mr. Cho; Credit as: Pedro Miguel Arce; Season, Episode: Season 3, Episode 2; Episodes Title: "Mr. Right"; TV Aired: 24 September 2001; DVD Released: TBA | |
