= The Animal =

2001 film by Luke Greenfield

- Theatrical release poster
- Directed by: Luke Greenfield
- Screenplay by: Tom Brady; Rob Schneider
- Story by: Tom Brady
- Produced by: Barry Bernardi; Carr D'Angelo; Todd Garner
- Starring: Rob Schneider; Colleen Haskell; John C. McGinley; Guy Torry; Edward Asner
- Cinematography: Peter Lyons Collister
- Edited by: Jeff Gourson; Peck Prior
- Music by: Teddy Castellucci
- Production companies: Columbia Pictures; Revolution Studios; Happy Madison Productions
- Distributed by: Sony Pictures Releasing
- Release date: June 1, 2001
- Running time: 83 minutes
- Country: United States
- Language: English
- Budget: $22-47 million
- Box office: $84.7 million

The Animal is a 2001 American comedy film directed by Luke Greenfield (in his feature length directorial debut), and written by Tom Brady and Rob Schneider from a story conceived by Brady. It stars Schneider in the lead role, alongside Colleen Haskell, John C. McGinley, Guy Torry, and Edward Asner with supporting roles by Michael Caton and Louis Lombardi. The film depicts a police station evidence clerk who is critically injured and is put back together by a mad scientist who transplants animal parts, resulting in strange animalistic changes to his behavior.

Produced by Revolution Studios and Adam Sandler's production company Happy Madison Productions, The Animal was released by Columbia Pictures in the United States on June 1, 2001. The film received unfavorable reviews.

== Plot ==
Marvin Mange is an evidence clerk at the local Elkerton police precinct who dreams of becoming an officer like his late father. However, despite physically training, as a result of his medical conditions, he repeatedly fails the physical examination. Marvin receives little respect from the populace and is especially tormented by Sergeant Doug Sisk. He is smitten with environmentalist Rianna Holmes, but fumbles on a first encounter with her.

While alone at the station, Marvin receives an emergency call; with no officers available, he responds himself. While on the way, he drives off a cliff and is grievously injured. However, he is rescued by mad scientist Dr. Wilder, who saves his life by replacing his damaged body parts with animal organs. Days later, Marvin, unaware of what happened, resumes his normal life but discovers that he can now perform extraordinary physical feats, his medical health no longer an issue, and possesses keen animal-like instincts. While visiting his friend Miles at an airport, Marvin sniffs out and apprehends a man attempting to smuggle drugs in his rectum. The event garners positive media attention, so he is promoted to full-fledged police officer assigned under Sisk.

Over several days, Marvin awakens from bouts of sleepwalking, hearing subsequent reports of attacks in the night being attributed to a savage beast. Wilder introduces himself to Marvin, cautioning him that while the operation improved him, it also resulted in strong animalistic urges as a side-effect. Despite continued predicaments and embarrassments caused by his instinctual animal behaviors, Marvin's abilities allow him to excel as an officer and bond with Rianna. However, Marvin is questioned after a brutal attack on a cow; a police sketch implicates Marvin as the culprit, and Marvin is subsequently placed on leave.

Afraid of what he has become, Marvin barricades himself inside his home. Rianna arrives to comfort him and the two spend the night together. The following morning, the police raid Marvin's home when they suspect him of mauling a hunter. Marvin escapes and flees into the woods. An armed mob headed by Sisk is formed, while Marvin's friends Miles and Fatty seek to warn him. Marvin encounters Wilder, who confides the existence of another patient who had undergone the same procedure; he suspects the other patient is the real culprit.

Sisk's lone pursuit of Marvin results in a near-fatal fall into a chasm, but he is saved by the latter. Despite this, Sisk holds him at gunpoint, but he is suddenly attacked by Rianna; revealed to be Wilder's other patient. Rianna confesses that she was responsible for the hunter attack, justifying her actions in protecting an orphaned turkey vulture she reared and released back into the wild. The mob arrives, threatening to kill Marvin. Miles makes a false confession to being the beast to protect Marvin and Rianna. Due to the racial implications in prosecuting Miles, a Black American, the mob lets him go and leave, much to Miles' annoyance.

One year later, Marvin and Rianna have married, starting a family and opening an animal sanctuary. While watching television, they witness Dr. Wilder being awarded the Nobel Prize for his transplantation procedure.

== Cast ==
- Rob Schneider as Marvin Menge, a police evidence clerk
- Colleen Haskell as Rianna Holmes, an animal activist
- John C. McGinley as Sgt. Doug Sisk, a police sergeant of the Elkerton Police Department
- Edward Asner as Chief Wilson, the elderly chief of the police department
- Michael Caton as Dr. Wilder, a mad scientist
- Louis Lombardi as Fatty, a fellow police cadet at the police department
- Guy Torry as Miles, an airport security guard who suffers from "reverse racism"
- Scott Wilson as the unnamed Mayor of Elkerton
- Michael Papajohn as Patrolman Brady
- Bob Rubin as Bob Harris, a farmer whose cows are attacked by Mange.

Additionally, Philip Daniel Bolden, Megan Harvey, Mitch Holleman portray evidence room kids. Fred Stoller cameos as a news reporter. Noel Gugliemi cameos as a gang leader. Norm Macdonald cameos as an angry mob member that asks Sisk mob-related questions. Adam Sandler plays a townie similar to Schneider's portrayal in The Waterboy, along with John Farley and Brianna Brown who are part of the angry mob. Wes Takahashi, former animator and visual effects supervisor for Industrial Light & Magic, makes a cameo appearance as a news reporter at Chief Wilson's press conference. Cloris Leachman and Harry Dean Stanton make uncredited cameos.

According to Schneider in the DVD commentary, the overweight cadet played by Elizabeth Branson, who competes against Marvin in the obstacle course, was voiced by an uncredited Amy Poehler.

== Production ==
The script was originally sold to Walt Disney Pictures, who had placed the film into turnaround under new management and sold it to Revolution Studios.

== Reception ==
=== Box office ===
The Animal debuted on June 1, 2001, grossing $19.6 million U.S. in its opening weekend (#3 behind Shrek and Pearl Harbor). With a production budget of $47 million, the movie grossed $84,772,742 internationally.

=== Critical response ===
On the review aggregator website Rotten Tomatoes, 30% of 84 critics' reviews are positive, with an average rating of 4.3/10. The website's consensus reads: "While less offensive and more charming than recent gross-humored comedies, The Animal is still rather mediocre." Metacritic, which uses a weighted average, assigned the film a score of 43 out of 100, based on 22 critics, indicating "mixed or average" reviews. Audiences polled by CinemaScore gave the film a grade B+.

Kevin Thomas of the Los Angeles Times called it "an outrageous and imaginative summer comedy". Robert Koehler of Variety magazine wrote: "The Animal is never more nor less than stupid, but stupid in ways that deliver goofiness rather than rampant humiliation."

Peter Travers of Rolling Stone described it as "an Adam Sandler reject" and wondered how this "raunchy innuendo wrapped in a PG-13 rating" got past the censors.

=== Controversy ===
Despite mostly negative critical reaction, at the time of the film's release, film critic David Manning gave the film critical praise. In late 2001, Manning was revealed to be a fictitious character created by Sony to fake publicity for the film. At the time, Sony claimed that the error was due to a layout artist who entered 'dummy text' into print advertisements during their design, which was accidentally never replaced with real text.

== Sequel ==
In October 2022, it was announced that a sequel is in development. In addition to reprising his role from the first film, Rob Schneider will also serve as director and use a script that he co-wrote with his wife Patricia Schneider and Jamie Lissow. Schneider will also serve as a producer on the film alongside Michael McConnell. The project will be a joint-venture production between Content Partners, Revolution Studios, MarVista Entertainment, Zero Gravity Management, and Tubi Original Films. Intended to be released via streaming as an exclusive Tubi film, the project was green-lit by the associated film studios.
