= Sherrod Small =

American comedian (born 1973)

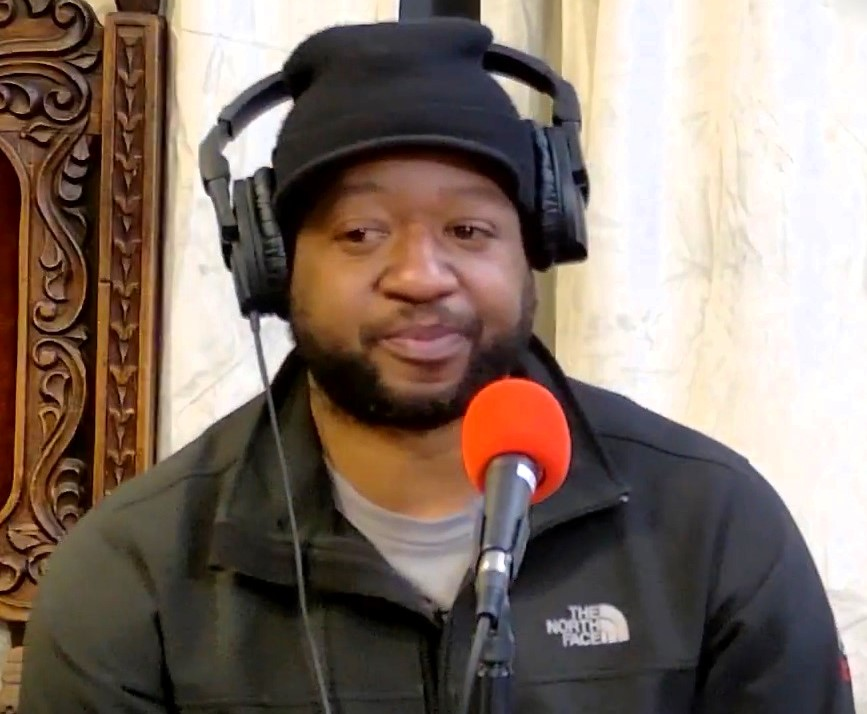
- Small in 2020
- Born: August 15, 1973 (age 52); Brooklyn, New York, U.S.
- Occupation: Comedian
- Years active: 1994—present
- Relatives: Chris Rock (cousin)

Sherrod Small (born August 15, 1973) is an American stand-up comedian and actor.

== Early life ==
Small was born and raised in the Bedford-Stuyvesant area of Brooklyn, New York, by his mother Barbara and two sisters Bridgette and Tanya. Small is a cousin of Chris Rock.

== Career ==
Small is a regular at the Comedy Cellar and Comic Strip Live in Manhattan. Sherrod was a regular on VH1's The Best Week Ever and served as a regular guest and stand-in host of Fox News's late-night satire program Red Eye w/ Greg Gutfeld. He once choked fellow comedian Mark Normand for making a joke about his set going long.

== Filmography ==
=== Film ===
Year	Title	Role	Notes
2002	Comedian	—N/a	Documentary
2008	Turbocharge: The Unauthorized Story of The Cars	Bryant Gumbel	
2014	Top Five	Black Guy Asking for Money	

=== Television ===
Year	Title	Role	Notes
2010–2012	Are We There Yet?	Malcolm	7 episodes
2011	The Electric Company	Rob Robson	Episode: "Tip It or Dip It"
2013	Insane Clown Posse Theater	Sherrod Small	Episode: "Sherrod Small"
2016	LI Divas	Danye Srivisal	2 episodes
2021	Harlem	Driver	Episode: "Secrets"
2022	Girls5eva	Paul	Episode: "Leave a Message If You Love Me"
TBA	Small World	Sherrod Small	Episode: "DassaBesso"
TBA	Owen Farm	Nigel Igger	Episode: "Nigel Lights a Candle"
