= Are We There Yet? (film) =

2005 film by Brian Levant

- Theatrical release poster
- Directed by: Brian Levant
- Screenplay by: Steven Gary Banks; Claudia Grazioso; J. David Stem; David N. Weiss
- Story by: Steven Gary Banks; Claudia Grazioso
- Produced by: Ice Cube; Matt Alvarez; Dan Kolsrud
- Starring: Ice Cube; Nia Long; Jay Mohr; Tracy Morgan
- Cinematography: Thomas E. Ackerman
- Edited by: Lawrence Jordan
- Music by: David Newman
- Production companies: Columbia Pictures; Revolution Studios; Cube Vision
- Distributed by: Sony Pictures Releasing
- Release date: January 21, 2005
- Running time: 95 minutes
- Country: United States
- Language: English
- Budget: $20-32 million
- Box office: $97.9 million

Are We There Yet? is a 2005 American comedy road film directed by Brian Levant, written by Steven Gary Banks, Claudia Grazioso, J. David Stem, and David N. Weiss, and starring Ice Cube, Nia Long, Aleisha Allen, Philip Daniel Bolden, Jay Mohr, M. C. Gainey, and Tracy Morgan. The plot follows Nick Persons, a smooth playboy and sports memorabilia store owner who falls for a divorced mother, Suzanne Kingston. To win her over, Nick volunteers to escort her two highly mischievous children, Lindsey and Kevin, from Portland to Vancouver for New Year's Eve. When a security mishap bans them from flying, Nick is forced to drive the kids in his prized Lincoln Navigator, sparking a chaotic, 350-mile road trip full of slapstick pranks as the children try to sabotage the relationship.

Are We There Yet? was released theatrically in the United States on January 21, 2005 by Sony Pictures Releasing. It received negative reviews from critics, but was a box office success, grossing $97.9 million against a $20–32 million budget. The film's success launched a franchise, including a sequel, Are We Done Yet? in 2007, and a television series which premiered in 2010. In addition, a third film is in development.

== Plot ==
In Portland, Lindsey and Kevin Kingston are two mischievous siblings who sabotage the relationships of their divorced mother in a determined effort to keep her single until their parents reconcile. Meanwhile, single child-hating sports shop owner Nick Persons purchases a brand new Lincoln Navigator and boasts with his beloved bobblehead doll of Satchel Paige who comes to life of its own will, though only Nick can hear him. After reaching his store, he witnesses a beautiful woman named Suzanne from across the street. On his way to talk to her, he is disgusted to find out that she has two kids, who turn out to be Lindsey and Kevin. Later that night, Nick runs into Suzanne and agrees to take her home after she has trouble with her car. As weeks go by, both of them bond and start getting closer to each other. On New Year's Eve, when Nick brings Suzanne to the local airport to go to Vancouver for a business trip, Suzanne's ex-husband Frank calls to say he is sick and cannot pick up to see the children, leaving her to put her trust in Nick.

Once at her house, Nick meets Kevin and Lindsey for the second time and their babysitter warns Nick he will fail as the kids fight over the front seat. The three go to the airport, where Kevin learns that corkscrews, a gift he got from Nick, are prohibited to bring onboard planes. Unable to get to a trash can, he slips the corkscrew in Nick's jacket pocket, which leads to Nick being subdued by security. They decide to take a train, but Kevin and Lindsey jump off to collect a cape from Kevin's action figure just as Nick boards with the train departing seconds later, forcing him to jump off and lose their luggage. They then reluctantly decide to drive.

Believing Nick is only Suzanne's friend, Kevin and Lindsey are tamed but still continue to make bad choices. Overhearing a phone call between Nick and his friend Marty, the two learn that Nick not only hates them, but also lied about not having feelings for Suzanne. Kevin fakes an asthma attack to lock Nick out of the car. Lindsey then tries to drive the car away, but fails due to not knowing how to drive, forcing Nick to chase after them and trying to get in from the rooftop. Lindsey drives the car into a lumberjack statue, causing its axe to hit Nick in his groin. Later, Lindsey signals to truck driver Al Buck who believes that they have been kidnapped, causing Nick to accidentally drive his car into the woods and down a hill, resulting in heavy damage to the car, angering him further. Ultimately, the kids run away to visit their father in a train with Nick pursuing them on a horse until he falls off.

Once they arrive at Frank's house, Kevin and Lindsey find out that he not only lied about being sick but has already started another family. Feeling betrayed and forgotten, they begin warming up to Nick, as he does with them, when Nick tells them his father also abandoned him. While beginning to become friends, they continue their journey on the road, but still find themselves facing various mishaps along the way. At one point, Kevin has to get an inhaler refill from a pharmacist working as a clown at a chaotic children's New Year's Eve party that in exchange for refilling Kevin's inhaler, Nick must watch the kids. During this, Lindsey reveals her singing talent, doing a karaoke version of Aretha Franklin's 1967 song "Respect". Back on the road, Kevin vomits on the car's windshield due to having too many sweets at the party and they pull into a conservation area to clean out the car. While Kevin and Nick feed a deer some cookies, Lindsey inadvertently scares it with a camera flash, causing the deer to attack Nick, resulting in him losing his car keys. Because of this, Nick tries to hotwire the car using his lighter. When he closes the hood, he accidentally causes the lighter to tip over and set the car on fire. They manage to take cover before the car explodes. Nick chastises the kids, but he quickly calms down and apologizes afterward.

With the car now a heap of scrap metal, the trio tries to hitch a ride from Al Buck. Still thinking Nick is a kidnapper, Al leaves him behind and drives off; Nick hitches a ride from a billboard truck driver named Ernst. In Al's truck, the kids attack him, leading to a chase that ends in Vancouver, where Nick fights Al. During the fight, Kevin has an asthma attack and collapses. Nick rushes to his aid and revives him. Witnessing the catastrophic event, Suzanne believes that trusting Nick was a mistake. After encouragement from Satchel, Nick goes to Suzanne's hotel room to say goodbye to her and the kids. After Suzanne realizes how much Nick and the kids have grown to care for each other, Suzanne tells Nick that he is the one for her, and they kiss as the new year begins, much to the delight of Lindsey and Kevin.

== Cast ==
- Ice Cube as Nick Persons
- Nia Long as Suzanne Kingston, Frank's ex-wife, Nick's love interest and Lindsey & Kevin's divorced mother
- Aleisha Allen as Lindsey Kingston, Suzanne's daughter
- Philip Daniel Bolden as Kevin Kingston, Suzanne's son
- Jay Mohr as Marty, Nick's best friend
- M. C. Gainey as Al Buck
- Tracy Morgan as the voice of a Satchel Paige Bobblehead
  - David Barclay as the Satchel Paige Bobblehead puppeteer
- Nichelle Nichols as Miss Mable, Lindsey & Kevin's babysitter
- C. Ernst Harth as Ernst
- Sean Millington as Frank Kingston, Suzanne's ex-husband and Lindsey & Kevin's divorced father
- Henry Simmons as Carl

== Production ==
In February 2003, it was announced that Ice Cube signed a multi-picture deal with Revolution Studios, with one of the projects on the development slate being a road trip comedy titled Are We There Yet?.

== Reception ==
On the review aggregator website Rotten Tomatoes, 12% of 112 critics' reviews are positive, with an average rating of 3.5/10. The website's consensus reads: "This supposed family comedy starring the usually blameless Ice Cube and Nia Long has provoked most critics to write, "Is it over yet?"." Metacritic, which uses a weighted average, assigned the film a score of 27 out of 100, based on 28 critics, indicating "generally unfavorable" reviews. Audiences polled by CinemaScore gave the film an average grade of "B+" on an A+ to F scale.

=== Box office ===
Are We There Yet? opened at number one with a gross of $18.6 million in 2,709 theaters, averaging $6,856 per venue. The film's opening weekend made up 22.57% of its final domestic gross. In its second weekend, the film dropped to number two, but lost just 12% of its audience, grossing a further $16.3 million, and raised the ten day total to $38.5 million. It closed on June 16, 2005, with a final gross of $97.9 million worldwide ($82.7 million in North America and $15.2 million internationally).

The film was released in the United Kingdom on February 17, 2005, and opened at number six within the first weekend. The next weekend, the film moved up one place, then down back to number six, before finally ending up at number 13 on March 25, 2005.

=== Home media ===
Are We There Yet? was released on VHS and DVD on May 24, 2005, by Sony Pictures Home Entertainment.

=== Awards and nominations ===
- BMI Music Film Award
- 2005 Teen Choice Awards: Choice Movie – Comedy (nominated, lost to Napoleon Dynamite)
- 2006 Kids' Choice Awards: Favorite Movie (nominated, lost to Harry Potter and the Goblet of Fire)

== Television series ==
In June 2010, Are We There Yet? premiered on TBS. The show's executive producer and creator is Ice Cube, who created and starred in the film adaptation. All of the roles from the film series are recast. Terry Crews, who previously worked with Ice Cube in Friday After Next and Lottery Ticket, takes over the role of Nick and Essence Atkins, who was in Half & Half and Smart Guy, takes over Nia Long's role as Suzanne. The show ended after three seasons in March 2013. Ice Cube has a recurring role as Suzanne's brother, Terrence.

== See also ==
- List of films set around New Year
