= Are We Done Yet? =

2007 film by Steve Carr

- Theatrical release poster
- Directed by: Steve Carr
- Screenplay by: Hank Nelken
- Story by: Hank Nelken
- Based on: Mr. Blandings Builds His Dream House by; Melvin Frank; Norman Panama; Characters by; Steven Gary Banks; Claudia Grazioso
- Produced by: Ted Hartley; Ice Cube; Matt Alvarez; Todd Garner
- Starring: Ice Cube; Nia Long; John C. McGinley; Aleisha Allen; Philip Daniel Bolden
- Cinematography: Jack Green
- Edited by: Craig P. Herring
- Music by: Teddy Castellucci
- Production companies: Columbia Pictures; Revolution Studios; RKO Pictures; Cube Vision; Broken Road Productions
- Distributed by: Sony Pictures Releasing
- Release date: April 4, 2007
- Running time: 92 minutes
- Country: United States
- Language: English
- Budget: $28 million
- Box office: $58.3 million

Are We Done Yet? is a 2007 American family comedy film directed by Steve Carr, written by Hank Nelken, and starring Ice Cube, Nia Long, and John C. McGinley. It is the sequel to Are We There Yet? (2005) and the second installment in the franchise, also based on Mr. Blandings Builds His Dream House (1948). The plot follows newlyweds Nick and Suzanne Persons as they move their family out of the city and into a spacious suburban fixer-upper in Oregon. However, their peaceful transition turns chaotic when they encounter severe structural issues and clash with Chuck Mitchell Jr., an eccentric local contractor whose bizarre business methods push Nick to his absolute limits.

The film was shot on location in Tsawwassen, Delta, British Columbia, Canada, but is set in the fictional neighborhood/city Newberg, Oregon, United States. The film grossed $58 million against a $28 million budget and, like its predecessor, received negative reviews from critics.

== Plot ==
Two years after the events of the first film, Nick Persons has married Suzanne Kingston and moved her children, Kevin and Lindsey into his apartment, as well as purchasing a Cadillac Escalade after he accidentally burnt up his Lincoln Navigator. He has also sold his sports memorabilia store and adopted a Berger Picard named Coco. Kevin and Lindsey have both matured since the previous events.

While getting ready for an interview with Magic Johnson to launch a sports magazine, Suzanne tries telling Nick something important, but is frequently interrupted. Later, during breakfast, Suzanne tells Nick about buying a 3-bedroom apartment right from their neighbors. Suzanne then reveals that she is pregnant and later finds out that they will be having twins.

Needing more space, they try to move to the country and meet Chuck Mitchell, Jr., an eccentric but incompetent local real estate agent/contractor, and after some talking, Nick decides to buy the house. The family then packs up their things and moves into the house, with Lindsey being against the move because she is far away from her friends, has no cell phone reception, and because there are no cute boys. However, as it turns out, Nick failed to get the house inspected first, and everybody scolds him as they soon find a mold infestation. While trying to resolve the mold issue, Chuck discovers even more problems with the house, and Nick becomes angry with him as he almost destroys it trying to fix them all while also being scolded by Suzanne and the kids after Nick goes fishing.

Meanwhile, Lindsey, still wanting to be treated like an adult, falls in love with one of Chuck's employees, Danny Pulu, a young adult and the youngest of the Pulu family, who equally starts flirting with her and happens to be from her math class in her old school. One night, Nick finds Lindsey's bedroom door wide open and suggests she has left the house, so he asks Kevin where she is and reveals that she went to a party at Danny's house. After finding her dancing with Danny, Nick grounds her while firing the Pulu brothers, causing her to resentful enough that she ignores him the next day.

When Nick gets a voicemail about an executive trying to move on with his idea if he can't get Magic, Nick finally decides to fire Chuck after he tells him that the house needs a whole new foundation during a yoga exercise where Suzanne scolds Nick for forgetting their practice from being busy working with the house. When Chuck reveals that he knew that there was more work to be done with the house, Nick tells Chuck to leave the house, which causes all those working on the house to quit out of loyalty to Chuck.

After everybody leaves, Suzanne scolds Nick again and tells him that he needs to hire Chuck back, but Nick refuses and tries to sell the house again so he can move back to his condo in the city. During their argument, Nick finally stands his ground and calls Suzanne out for her naiveté while also arguing that he would not be in the situation if it weren't for her and the kids. Needing some time to think, Suzanne then proclaims that she and the kids will be staying in the guest house until she cools down.

After taking some time to think, Nick decides to fix the house on his own after having a talk with Kevin while fishing and Lindsey apologizing, promising to truly act mature from then on. This inspires Nick to apologize to Chuck, causing the latter to reveal that his wife, a famous country singer, died a few years prior. Chuck tries making things up in return by bringing his friends back to help, including Kevin, Lindsey, and Danny, who his brothers force him to apologize about the party.

After finishing the house, when Nick tries to apologize, Suzanne is in the middle of having contractions and starts going into labor. The family tries to go to the hospital, but since the hospital is half an hour away, the babies are coming quickly. With no choice but to have labor in the house, Nick, Kevin, and Lindsey have to deliver the babies. Chuck tries to get there, but his truck breaks down and he is forced to power walk down to the house. While she is still in labor, Nick gets a call from Magic Johnson. After Suzanne gives birth to identical twin boys, the movie ends six months later with a big BBQ in their backyard, at which Nick debuts his new magazine titled Are We Done Yet?, based on his experience building the house.

== Cast ==
- Ice Cube as Nicholas "Nick" J. Persons
- John C. McGinley as Chuck Mitchell, Jr.
- Nia Long as Suzanne Kingston-Persons, Nick's wife
- Aleisha Allen as Lindsey Kingston-Persons, Suzanne's daughter and Nick's stepdaughter
- Philip Daniel Bolden as Kevin Kingston-Persons, Suzanne's son and Nick's stepson
- Dan Joffre as Billy Pulu
- Pedro Miguel Arce as Georgie Pulu
- Linda Kash as Mrs. Rooney
- Hayes MacArthur as Jimmy, The Bartender
- Tahj Mowry as Danny Pulu
- Jonathan Katz as Mr. Rooney
- Jacob Vargas as Mike, The Plumber
- Colin and Gavin Strange as The Kingston-Persons' Twins
- Magic Johnson as himself

== Production ==
While the film is a sequel to an original concept continuing the storyline and characters, the film is also a remake of the 1948 Cary Grant comedy Mr. Blandings Builds His Dream House and produced by Ted Hartley of RKO Pictures.

== Release ==
Are We Done Yet? grossed $58.4 million worldwide. The film was released in the United Kingdom on June 8, 2007, and opened on #3, behind Ocean's Thirteen and Pirates of the Caribbean: At World's End.

== Reception ==
Like its predecessor, Are We Done Yet? was panned by critics. On the review aggregator website Rotten Tomatoes, 7% of 91 critics' reviews are positive, with an average rating of 3.4/10. The website's consensus reads: "Are We Done Yet? plays it way too safe with generic slapstick and uninspired domestic foibles." Metacritic, which uses a weighted average, assigned the film a score of 36 out of 100, based on 21 critics, indicating "generally unfavorable" reviews. Audiences polled by CinemaScore gave the film an average grade of "B" on an A+ to F scale.

Neil Smith for BBC.com gave the film 1 out of 5 stars and wrote: "McGinley, as it happens, is the film's only trump card, his madcap multi tasker stealing every scene he's in and leaving the movie's nominal star for dead."

In one of the few positive reviews for the film, Nathan Rabin of The A.V. Club gave the film a grade B. Rabin praises McGinley and calls Ice Cube's performance "strangely charming". Rabin concludes: "It isn't gangsta, but it's winning all the same."
