= Revolution Studios =

American production company

Revolution Studios Distribution Company, LLC
- Trade name: Revolution Studios
- Type: Subsidiary
- Industry: Film; Television
- Founded: January 12, 2000; 26 years ago
- Founder: Joe Roth
- Headquarters: 10877 Wilshire Blvd St., Los Angeles, California, United States
- Key people: Scott Hemming (CEO)
- Products: Motion pictures Television series
- Parent: Content Partners LLC
- Website: Official website

Revolution Studios Distribution Company, LLC (operating as Revolution Studios) is an American independent motion picture and foreign sales company headed by Chief Executive Officer Scott Hemming, founded by Joe Roth on January 12, 2000, and based in Los Angeles, California.

The company focuses primarily on the distribution, remake, and sequel rights to titles in its library, which it continues to add to through acquisitions and new productions.

== Company history ==
On January 12, 2000, after a successful run at Walt Disney Studios, and his time at 20th Century Fox and Caravan Pictures, Joe Roth left Disney, to create a yet-unnamed venture. On February 17, 2000, Roth signed an agreement with actress Julia Roberts to star in their films as well as producing through their Shoelace Productions banner.

On June 7, 2000, Roth officially decided to name his new venture Revolution Studios (the name coming from the song by The Beatles, as he has admitted to being a lifelong fan of the band) and announced that Tomcats would be the first film to be produced by the studio. On the same day, Revolution Studios entered into an agreement with Sony Pictures (which also owned a stake in the company) to distribute and market Revolution Studios' films. Roth owned the controlling interest in Revolution Studios. Other equity owners included Hollywood executives Todd Garner, Rob Moore, Tom Sherak and Elaine Goldsmith-Thomas, as well as Starz Entertainment and 20th Century Fox. Starz owned exclusive cable distribution rights, with broadcast television licenses going to Fox. The company sold their films to various distributors in Germany, Italy, Japan, Scandinavia, Portugal and Israel.

Soon afterwards, the company expanded into television production, under the moniker Revolution Television, with Queens Supreme as its first product, followed by a deal with American Girl.

On January 5, 2005, Revolution Studios signed a television syndication distribution deal with Debmar-Mercury to market their library to syndication.

In August 2006, Revolution Studios announced that it had licensed to Universal Pictures the sequel rights to its comic-book-inspired hit Hellboy (2004). Universal released Hellboy II: The Golden Army in the United States in 2008.

Coinciding with the end of its six-year distribution deal with Sony in 2007, Revolution Studios turned its attention to exploiting the remake, sequel and television rights to films in its library. Roth suddenly decided to move into a producing deal with Sony Pictures to start his own production company.

Revolution Studios produced a sitcom based on its comedy feature Are We There Yet?, which ran from June 1, 2010 to March 2, 2013 on TBS, as well as a sitcom adaptation of Anger Management, which ran from June 28, 2012 to December 22, 2014 on FX.

In June 2014, Roth announced that he had sold Revolution Studios to funds managed by Fortress Investment Group for roughly $250 million. Roth continues to serve as a strategic adviser and develops television projects for the Revolution Studios through a first-look deal. Concurrent with the sale, former Chief Operating Officer Vince Totino was promoted to CEO, and former finance executive Scott Hemming was named COO.

After the sale, the newly recapitalized Revolution Studios began adding to its library through a series of acquisitions. In October 2014, Revolution Studios acquired the foreign rights and copyrights of Morgan Creek Productions.

In October 2015, Revolution Studios acquired Cross Creek Pictures' 50% interests in feature films Black Swan and The Ides of March. Later that month, Revolution Studios purchased the eight-film Cold Spring Pictures film library, including the 2009 Academy Award nominee and Golden Globe Award winner Up in the Air.

Also in 2015, Revolution Studios announced a partnership with Universal Pictures Home Entertainment to produce non-theatrical sequels, prequels, or other spin-offs based on the titles in Revolution Studios' library.

In June 2016, Revolution Studios expanded its library to 126 films when it acquired worldwide rights to five films produced by Graham King's GK Films: Hugo, The Tourist, Edge of Darkness, The Rum Diary and The Young Victoria. The rights were previously held by Dallas-based Tango Films. In January 2017, Revolution Studios returned to film production with their release XXX: Return of Xander Cage, the company's first film since 2007's The Water Horse: Legend of the Deep.

In January 2017, Content Partners LLC and its affiliate CP Enterprises acquired Revolution Studios from investment funds managed by affiliates of Fortress Investment Group for a yet-to-be-disclosed price.

== Corporate partnerships ==
In October 2014, Revolution Studios forged a global licensing pact with Miramax, wherein Miramax would sell the worldwide television and digital distribution rights to Revolution Studios' library. Miramax has been handling U.S. sales of the Revolution Studios library since June 2012.

In May 2016, Revolution Studios announced that it had made a seven-figure investment for a stake in Spanish-language digital services company Latin Everywhere, agreeing to license Spanish-dubbed versions of its library titles to Latin Everywhere's video streaming platform Pongalo (Spanish for "play it").

In October 2019, Revolution Studios signed a worldwide television and digital distribution deal with Sony Pictures Television, covering the Revolution Studios and Morgan Creek libraries.

== Films ==
Here is a list of films independently produced by Revolution Studios:

=== Theatrical films ===
Release date	Title	Notes	Budget	Gross (worldwide)
March 30, 2001	Tomcats	co-production with Eagle Cove Entertainment	$11 million	$23,430,766
June 1, 2001	The Animal	co-production with Happy Madison Productions	$47 million	$84,772,742
July 20, 2001	America's Sweethearts	co-production with Face Productions, Roth-Arnold Productions and Shoelace Productions	$46 million	$138,191,428
November 2, 2001	The One	co-production with Hard Eight Pictures	$49 million	$72,689,126
December 28, 2001	Black Hawk Down	co-production with Jerry Bruckheimer Films and Scott Free Productions	$92 million	$172,989,651
May 10, 2002	The New Guy		$13 million	$31,167,388
August 2, 2002	The Master of Disguise	co-production with Happy Madison Productions	$16 million	$43,411,001
August 9, 2002	XXX	co-production with Original Film	$70 million	$277,448,382
September 13, 2002	Stealing Harvard	co-production with Imagine Entertainment	$25 million	$14,277,032
November 1, 2002	Punch-Drunk Love	co-production with New Line Cinema	$25 million	$24,665,649
December 13, 2002	Maid in Manhattan	co-production with Red Om Films	$55 million	$154,906,693
January 24, 2003	Darkness Falls	co-production with Distant Corners	$11 million	$47,488,536
March 7, 2003	Tears of the Sun	co-production with Cheyenne Enterprises	$75 million	$86,468,162
April 11, 2003	Anger Management	co-production with Happy Madison Productions	$75 million	$195,745,823
May 9, 2003	Daddy Day Care	co-production with Davis Entertainment	$69 million	$164,433,867
June 13, 2003	Hollywood Homicide		$75 million	$51,142,659
August 1, 2003	Gigli	co-production with City Light Films and Casey Silver Productions	$75 million	$7,266,209
October 24, 2003	Radio	co-production with Tollin/Robbins Productions	$35 million	$53,293,628
November 26, 2003	The Missing	co-production with Imagine Entertainment	$60 million	$38,364,277
December 19, 2003	Mona Lisa Smile	co-production with Red Om Films	$65 million	$141,337,989
December 25, 2003	Peter Pan	studio credit, global TV rights and international sales in Scandinavia, Portugal and Israel co-production with Universal Pictures, Columbia Pictures, Red Wagon Entertainment and Allied Stars Ltd.	$130 million	$121,975,011
April 2, 2004	Hellboy	co-production with Lawrence Gordon Productions and Dark Horse Entertainment	$66 million	$99,318,987
April 23, 2004	13 Going on 30		$37 million	$96,455,697
June 23, 2004	White Chicks	co-production with Wayans Bros. Entertainment	$37 million	$113,086,475
August 6, 2004	Little Black Book		$35 million	$22,034,832
September 24, 2004	The Forgotten	co-production with The Jinks/Cohen Company	$42 million	$117,592,831
November 24, 2004	Christmas with the Kranks	co-production with 1492 Pictures	$60 million	$96,572,480
January 21, 2005	Are We There Yet?	co-production with Cube Vision	$32 million	$97,918,663
February 25, 2005	Man of the House		$40 million	$21,577,624
April 29, 2005	XXX: State of the Union	co-production with Original Film	$87 million	$71,022,693
September 9, 2005	An Unfinished Life	co-production with Miramax Films, Initial Entertainment Group and The Ladd Company	$30 million	$18,618,284
October 14, 2005	The Fog		$18 million	$46,201,432
October 21, 2005	The Prize Winner of Defiance, Ohio	co-production with DreamWorks Pictures and ImageMovers	$12 million	$689,028
November 23, 2005	Rent	co-production with 1492 Pictures and Tribeca Productions	$40 million	$31,670,620
February 17, 2006	Freedomland	co-production with Scott Rudin Productions	$30 million	$14,655,628
April 7, 2006	The Benchwarmers	co-production with Happy Madison Productions	$33 million	$64,957,291
June 23, 2006	Click	co-production with Columbia Pictures, Happy Madison Productions and Original Film	$82.5 million	$237,681,299
July 14, 2006	Little Man	co-production with Wayans Bros. Entertainment	$64 million	$101,595,121
August 11, 2006	Zoom	co-production with Team Todd Films and Boxing Cat Films	$35 million	$12,506,188
December 20, 2006	Rocky Balboa	co-production with Metro-Goldwyn-Mayer and Columbia Pictures	$24 million	$155,721,132
April 4, 2007	Are We Done Yet?	co-production with RKO Pictures and Cube Vision	$28 million	$58,388,068
April 13, 2007	Perfect Stranger		$60 million	$73,090,611
April 27, 2007	Next	co-production with Saturn Films, Virtual Studios and Initial Entertainment Group; distributed by Paramount Pictures	$70 million	$76,066,841
August 8, 2007	Daddy Day Camp	co-production with TriStar Pictures, Davis Entertainment and Blue Star Entertainment	$6 million	$18,197,398
September 7, 2007	The Brothers Solomon	co-production with Carsey-Werner Productions; theatrically distributed by Screen Gems	$10 million	$1,035,056
October 12, 2007	Across the Universe	co-production with Team Todd	$45 million	$29,367,143
December 25, 2007	The Water Horse: Legend of the Deep	co-production with Walden Media, Beacon Pictures and Ecosse Pictures	$40 million	$103,071,443
January 20, 2017	XXX: Return of Xander Cage	co-production with Paramount Pictures, One Race Films and Roth/Kirschenbaum Films	$85 million	$338,678,346

=== Direct-to-video films ===
Release date	Title	Notes
October 28, 2006	Hellboy: Sword of Storms	co-production with Film Roman
March 17, 2007	Hellboy: Blood and Iron	co-production with Film Roman
January 29, 2019	Benchwarmers 2: Breaking Balls	co-production with Universal 1440 Entertainment
February 5, 2019	Grand-Daddy Day Care	co-production with Universal 1440 Entertainment

== Television ==
Start date	End date	Title	Network	Notes	Seasons	Episodes
January 10, 2003	May 16, 2003	Queens Supreme	CBS	as Revolution Television; co-production with Red Om Films, Shoelace Productions, Shadowland Productions, CBS Productions and Spelling Television	1	13
June 2, 2010	March 1, 2013	Are We There Yet?	TBS	co-production with 5914 Productions, Ltd., Cube Vision and Debmar-Mercury	3	100
April 11, 2011	June 3, 2011	Drew Carey's Improv-A-Ganza	GSN	as Revolution Television; co-production with Three Foot Giant Productions and International Mammoth Television	1	40
November 29, 2011	July 23, 2012	Una Maid en Manhattan	Telemundo	co-production with Sony Pictures Television	1	163
June 28, 2012	December 22, 2014	Anger Management	FX	co-production with Mohawk Productions, Estevez/Sheen Productions, Twisted Television, Debmar-Mercury and Lionsgate Television	2	100

=== Television films/specials ===
Release date	Title	Network	Notes
November 23, 2004	Samantha: An American Girl Holiday	The WB	as Revolution Television; co-production with Red Om Films, American Girl and Warner Bros. Television
November 29, 2005	Felicity: An American Girl Adventure	The WB	as Revolution Television; co-production with Red Om Films, American Girl and Warner Bros. Television
November 26, 2006	Molly: An American Girl on the Home Front	Disney Channel	as Revolution Television; co-production with Red Om Films, American Girl and Warner Bros. Television
January 27, 2019	Rent: Live	Fox	co-production with Marc Platt Productions, Sony Pictures Television and 20th Century Fox Television

== See also ==
- Caravan Pictures/Spyglass Media Group
- Morgan Creek Entertainment
- Roth/Kirschenbaum Films
