= Philip Daniel Bolden =

American actor

Phillip Daniel Bolden
- Born: Philip Daniel Bolden; March 19, 1995 (age 31); New Orleans, Louisiana, U.S.
- Occupation: Actor
- Years active: 1999–2008; 2016–present

Philip Daniel Bolden (born March 19, 1995) is an American actor. In 2005, Bolden played Kevin in the film Are We There Yet?, with Ice Cube and Nia Long, and again in 2007, in its sequel film Are We Done Yet? as well as Kirby on The King of Queens (1999–2000).

== Biography and career ==
His first on-screen appearance was on King of Queens as Kirby Palmer in 1999. He appeared as "Mack Jr." in Johnson Family Vacation. Other film appearances include The Animal and Little Nicky.

On television, Bolden has guest starred on According to Jim, CSI: Miami, Malcolm in the Middle and has had recurring roles on both My Wife and Kids and The King of Queens. He also appeared in the telefilm Play'd: A Hip Hop Story. In 2001, he had a leading role in Macy Gray's music video "Sweet Baby". In 1999, he appeared in a commercial for McDonald's along with NBA's Kobe Bryant. Bolden took a decade-long hiatus from his acting after appearing in Fly Me to the Moon in 2008. But he has returned to acting, recently being cast as a main cast member in the 2021 AMC show, Millennials as Travis Lewis.

== Filmography ==
Film and Television
Year	Title	Role	Notes
1999–2000	The King of Queens	Kirby Palmer	
1999	Mystery Men	Roland	
1999	3rd Rock from the Sun	Ben	S05E08
2000	Little Nicky	Kid at basketball game	
2001	The Bernie Mac Show	Little Boy	S01E02
2001	The Animal	Evidence Room Kid	
2002	Malcolm in the Middle	Eight Year Old	
2002	CSI: Miami	Bryan Woods	
2002	My Wife and Kids	Devon	
2003	According to Jim	Kid	S02E15
2004	Johnson Family Vacation	Mack Jr.	
2004	Woman Thou Art Loosed	Todd (age 8)	
2005	Are We There Yet?	Kevin Kingston	
2006	How to Eat Fried Worms	Bradley	
2007	Are We Done Yet?	Kevin Persons	
2008	Fly Me to the Moon 3D	I.Q.	
2018	The Dead Girls Detective Agency	Jed Crossland	
2019	iZombie	Harris	S05E05
2020	NCIS: Los Angeles	Marcus Babu	S12E05
2021	Millennials	Travis Lewis	
TBA	Are They Gone Yet?	Kevin Persons	

== Awards and nominations ==
=== Nomination ===
- 2006: Young Artist Award, as the Best Young Actor in Are We There Yet?.

=== Won ===
- 2007: Young Artist Award, as Best Ensemble for How to Eat Fried Worms.
