= The Fog (2005 film) =

2005 film by Rupert Wainwright

- Theatrical release poster
- Directed by: Rupert Wainwright
- Screenplay by: Cooper Layne
- Based on: The Fog by John Carpenter; Debra Hill
- Produced by: John Carpenter; David Foster; Debra Hill
- Starring: Tom Welling; Maggie Grace; Rade Šerbedžija; Selma Blair
- Cinematography: Nathan Hope
- Edited by: Dennis Virkler
- Music by: Graeme Revell
- Production companies: Columbia Pictures; Revolution Studios; Debra Hill Productions; David Foster Productions
- Distributed by: Sony Pictures Releasing
- Release date: October 14, 2005
- Running time: 100 minutes (theatrical); 103 minutes (unrated)
- Countries: United States; Canada
- Language: English
- Budget: $18 million
- Box office: $46.2 million

The Fog is a 2005 supernatural horror film directed by Rupert Wainwright and starring Tom Welling, Selma Blair, and Maggie Grace. It is a remake of John Carpenter's 1980 film of the same name and was produced by Carpenter and Debra Hill who co-wrote the original film.

The film tells the story of a strange fog that sweeps in over an island town off the coast of Oregon, bringing with it the vengeful spirits of mariners who were murdered there 134 years before. The townspeople find themselves trapped and fighting for their lives while discovering the truth of their dark history.

Produced by Revolution Studios, it was released by Sony Pictures Releasing through its Columbia Pictures label on October 14, 2005. The film was panned by critics and grossed $46.2 million.

== Plot ==
In 1871, William Blake, a wealthy man suffering from leprosy arranges to purchase half of Antonio Island, off the coast of Oregon, to establish a leper colony for his afflicted people. However, island residents Patrick Malone, Norman Castle, Richard Wayne and David Williams double cross Blake. During a foggy night, they loot his clipper ship, the Elizabeth Dane, and set it on fire, killing all aboard. As they escape, Williams is dragged into the sea by a spirit, much to the shock of the other men.

134 years later, the residents of Antonio Island prepare to honor their founding fathers - unaware they were the same men who burned the Elizabeth Dane – and a statue of them is to be unveiled on the town's anniversary. During a boating trip, Nick Castle and his friend Spooner unwittingly disturb a bag containing a pocket watch and a hairbrush from the Elizabeth Dane lying on the seabed.

That night, Nick meets his former girlfriend, Elizabeth Williams, who has returned after six months. Elizabeth is shown the antique pocket watch by Machen, an old man who found it washed up on the beach. He warns her ominously "if you touch it, things will change". The watch begins ticking as Elizabeth holds it. She sees a hallmark on it, which includes a set of scales. Later, supernatural occurrences start to plague the town. Objects move by themselves, power outages occur, and the windows in Nick's truck inexplicably shatter.

Nick and Elizabeth then encounter drunken priest Father Malone, who is ranting about murderers and retribution. Meanwhile, at the local radio station, host Stevie Wayne gets a phone call from weatherman Dan about a large fog bank off the coast. Out at sea on Nick's boat, Spooner and Nick's cousin Sean are partying with two young women, Mandi and Jennifer. As the fog reaches them, the boat's engine stops, and the instruments break. An old clipper ship appears in the fog next to them. Seemingly possessed, Jennifer draws a set of scales on a misted window inside the boat. Unseen forces then kill Mandi, Jennifer, and Sean. At Nick's beach house, Elizabeth has been dreaming about the Elizabeth Dane. She searches the Internet for information about the hallmark symbol she saw earlier, but her computer malfunctions, and the word "Dane" appears on the screen. She hears a knock at the front door, goes outside but finds nothing. As she walks down to the beach, the fog begins approaching, but Nick brings her back inside.

The next day, Nick's Uncle Hank telephones him about the disappearance of his boat. Nick and Elizabeth sail out and find the vessel and the three corpses. Elizabeth goes into the hold and finds Spooner alive in a freezer. They return to the island where Mayor Tom Malone – Father Malone's father – suspects Spooner of the murders. In the morgue, Sean's corpse briefly rises up and accosts Elizabeth. At the library, Elizabeth researches the scales symbol seen on the watch's hallmark. It represented an old trading colony north of Antonio Island, which generated substantial wealth through intercontinental trade but was abandoned due to a leprosy outbreak. At the docks, Elizabeth finds the buried journal of Patrick Malone from 1871. She and Nick learn the story of the Elizabeth Dane and realize the founders built the town with the fortune they had stolen from the ship, but kept this secret from their families and the townsfolk.

The ghosts of the Elizabeth Dane seek revenge against Antonio Island's residents for the past crimes of its founding fathers. After killing Machen on the beach and Dan at the weather station, they pursue Stevie's son Andy and his Aunt Connie at home. Connie is killed, but Nick and Elizabeth rescue Andy. In her car, Stevie is also attacked, but she escapes. They travel to the Town Hall where they discover the founding father's crimes against the people on the Elizabeth Dane.

The spirits attack the hall, and kill Hank Castle, Kathy Williams, and the Malones. The ghost of Blake then sees Elizabeth. Despite being a descendant of David Williams, Elizabeth is the reincarnation of Blake's wife and was one of her ancestor's victims, hence her mysterious dreams about the Elizabeth Dane. Blake kisses Elizabeth, who transforms into a spirit and disappears as Nick watches helplessly. The next day, the survivors try to cope with their traumatic experiences and the truth about their ancestors. As Stevie reflects on the night's events with her listeners, Nick throws Patrick Malone's journal into the sea.

== Cast ==
- Tom Welling as Nicholas "Nick" Castle
- Maggie Grace as Elizabeth Williams
- Selma Blair as Stevie Wayne
- DeRay Davis as Spooner
- Kenneth Welsh as Mayor Tom Malone
- Adrian Hough as Father Robert Malone
- Sara Botsford as Kathy Williams
- Cole Heppell as Andrew "Andy" Wayne
- Mary Black as Aunt Connie
- Jonathon Young as Dan the Weatherman
- R. Nelson Brown as Machen
- Christian Bocher as Founding Father Malone
- Douglas H. Arthurs as Founding Father Williams
- Yves Cameron as Founding Father Wayne
- Charles André as Founding Father Castle
- Rade Šerbedžija as Captain Blake
- Matthew Currie Holmes as Sean Castle
- Sonja Bennett as Mandi
- Meghan Heffern as Brandi/Jennifer
- Alex Bruhanski as Uncle Hank Castle
- Dan Shea and Rick Pearce as Fishermen

== Production ==
An international co-production film between the United States and Canada. The original film's makers, John Carpenter and Debra Hill, expressed interest in remaking the original film on the film's DVD commentary. They are both credited as producers for the remake. The 2005 film was green-lit by Revolution Studios before the script was finished. Tom Welling had filmed for three weeks on the fourth season of his TV series Smallville when he started work on The Fog. Blair performed almost all of her stunts and spent 12 hours in a water tank with only short surface breaks for two days to shoot her underwater scenes. StudioCanal—which owns the rights to the original film—assisted in the film's production in exchange for French distribution rights.

Although set on an island off the Oregon coast, the location scenes were filmed in Canada. Some scenes were filmed around Cowichan Bay, most of the beach scenes were filmed in Tofino, and those of the town of Antonio Bay were filmed on Bowen Island and Fort Langley—all in British Columbia. It was one of Hill's final projects before her death from cancer in 2005 (the other being the 2006 film World Trade Center).

== Reception ==
=== Critical reception ===
The film was not screened for critics before its release. On the review aggregator website Rotten Tomatoes, 4% of 68 critics' reviews are positive, with an average rating of 2.9/10. The website's consensus reads: "The Fog is a so-so remake of a so-so movie, lacking scares, suspense or originality." Metacritic, which uses a weighted average, assigned the film a score of 27 out of 100, based on 16 critics, indicating "generally unfavorable" reviews. Audiences polled by CinemaScore gave the film an average grade of "C−" on an A+ to F scale.

The Fog was widely considered an unsuccessful remake of the original 1980 movie.

The Hollywood Reporter said the remake "lack[ed] the scares necessary to satisfy its target audience", and Variety said that "interest lags between the grisly deaths, and, worse, none of the characters generates rooting interest." The film was rated D− by Owen Gleiberman of Entertainment Weekly.

=== Box office ===
In the US, The Fog grossed $11,752,917 on its opening weekend. The film had a final domestic gross of $29,550,869, and a total worldwide gross of $46,201,432.

=== Home media ===
The film was released on DVD and VHS on January 24, 2006.

A Blu-ray version of the film has yet to be released in the US. Fremantle's MediumRare Entertainment issued The Fog on Blu-ray in the UK on 25 October 2021. The disc is Region B Locked.

=== Awards ===
The film received two awards. The first was the Fangoria Chainsaw Awards award as Worst Film, and the second was the Stinkers Bad Movie Awards for being the Least Scary Horror Movie.

== Music ==
The Fog: Original Motion Picture Soundtrack

Film score by Graeme Revell
- Released: November 1, 2005
- Length: 39:20
- Label: Varèse Sarabande

All tracks are written by Graeme Revell.

The Fog: Original Motion Picture Soundtrack
No.	Title	Length
1.	"Prologue"	2:31
2.	"God's Country"	0:38
3.	"Anchor Lockup"	1:51
4.	"It Wants Us"	2:20
5.	"The Hallmark"	1:27
6.	"Shower Love"	1:12
7.	"Elizabeth..."	2:52
8.	"Boathouse"	1:36
9.	"Statues"	2:00
10.	"Lights Out"	1:31
11.	"Island History"	1:43
12.	"The Search"	3:18
13.	"Burned Image"	0:46
14.	"It's Here"	3:39
15.	"Crime Aboard"	2:42
16.	"Tragedy on the Elizabeth Dane"	3:18
17.	"The Reckoning"	1:50
18.	"The Fog Recedes"	1:41
19.	"Epilogue"	1:17
Total length:		39:20

Songs featured in the motion picture, but not in the commercial release

- "Sugar, We're Goin Down" – Performed by Fall Out Boy
- "Salome's Wish" – Performed by The Booda Velvets
- "Vibrate" – Performed by Petey Pablo
- "Take Off Your Clothes" – Performed by Morningwood
- "Nighttime" – Performed by Petracovich
- "Feels Just Like It Should" – Performed by Jamiroquai
- "Invincible" – Performed by OK Go
- "What Died" – Performed by Nichole Alden

== See also ==
- List of ghost films
