= Daddy Day Care (film series) =

- Official film series logo, released in 2003
- Based on: Daddy Day Care by Geoff Rodkey
- Production company: Revolution Studios
- Distributed by: Sony Pictures (1, 2); Universal Studios Home Entertainment (3)
- Country: United States
- Language: English
- Budget: $66,000,000 (2 films)
- Box office: $186,277,591 (3 films)

The Daddy Day Care film series consists of American family-comedy films. Based on original characters by Geoff Rodkey, the plot centers around unemployed dads who start a day care service to help bring in more funds for their respective families. Comedic circumstances follow, as the men are overwhelmed by the rambunctious and mischievous actions of the children.

The first film, though a financial success at the box-office, received generally negative reviews from critics. Variety called it "scarcely more amusing than spending ninety minutes in a pre K classroom". Part two proved to be a moderate success financially, though it was panned by film critics with critiques pointed at the overuse of potty humor. The final film in the trilogy, which debuted over a decade after its predecessor, was made with a small-budget and was released straight-to-home video. The film was met with negative reviews, though it fared well with rentals and sales.

== Films ==
Film	U.S. release date	Director	Screenwriter(s)	Story by	Producers
Daddy Day Care	May 9, 2003	Steve Carr	Geoff Rodkey	Geoff Rodkey	John Davis, Wyck Godfrey and Matt Berenson
Daddy Day Camp	August 8, 2007	Fred Savage	Geoff Rodkey and J. David Stem & David N. Weiss	Joel Cohen & Alec Sokolow and Geoff Rodkey	William Sherak and Jason Shuman
Grand-Daddy Day Care	February 5, 2019	Ron Oliver	Robbie Fox & David H. Steinberg	Robbie Fox	Mike Elliott, Joseph P. Genier, and Greg Holstein

=== Daddy Day Care (2003) ===
Charles "Charlie" Hinton is unemployed and a stay-at-home father, taking care of his young son, while his wife makes a living and pays for the bills. Charlie works with his friend named Phillip "Phil" Ryerson, who is also without a job, to establish Daddy Day Care. The pair quickly gain a popular reputation, causing an enrollment swell. With additional regulations, they struggle to keep business alive. When a competing day care owner named Ms. Gwyneth Harridan calls the attention social workers in attempt to put Daddy Day Care out of business, social services notifies the business that their operating home is not large enough for their number of clients, causing Charlie and Phil to hold a fundraiser to raise funding.

Events that follow lead Charlie to quit the company, and focus on his family instead. As parents flock to Ms. Harridan's Day Care, Charlie and Phil realize their role in children's lives. At a student orientation, the pair reveal her careless ways and expose her distaste for her work. Expressing their love for the children that they have cared for, adults sign on for business with Daddy Day Care, earning the company enough money for the new office.

=== Daddy Day Camp (2007) ===
Charlie Hinton and Phil Ryerson, close friends who formed a successful day care center partnership, purchase a camp site from their past. After being instigated by their wives to do so, Camp Driftwood becomes a business venture between the pair. An offshoot of their Daddy Day Care business, Charlie and Phil face insurmountable odds when renovating the site, while also competing with a nearby rival location. Camp Canola, ran by Charlie's rival named Lance, is a luxurious, successful, and thriving campsite, while Camp Driftwood requires a lot of work to restore the grounds to its former glory.

After various attempts, the duo find that they may face a bankruptcy process. Along with the plans for the upcoming Olympiad challenge event between the rival camps, Charlie and Phil become overwhelmed. Charlie approaches his estranged father, for help in returning the camp to its prestigious past reputation. Buck Hinton, a military veteran, seeks to help the pair, but is critical of his son and Phil. After various differences he leaves the camp, only a difficult reconciliation between father and son, so that Charlie won't disappoint the children and bring Buck back to the campgrounds. With the help of Buck, Camp Driftwood reveals that the competing team was cheating all along, and that they have for years. Camp Canola's trophies are destroyed, while every parent from that camp request to sign up for Camp Driftwood. Saving the pair from a foreclosure, the partnership looks forward to coming seasons with the sign-ons.

=== Grand-Daddy Day Care (2019) ===
Frank Collins is a best-selling author, who suffers from writer's block. While attempting to crack the story for his next novel he and his wife, Emma, struggle to pay their bills and make ends meet. Her hard-headed/former-convict and retired lawyer father, Eduardo, comes to stay with them. Finding it more difficult to entertain his father-in-law and attempt to write his next novel, Frank decides to invite over Eduardo's friends to keep him preoccupied. Their home filled with elderly seniors, falls into mischief. The Collins couple realize that they could be making money by hosting and monitoring these elderly individuals. Upon learning of the business being run from the house, a persistent social worker named Ned Tooley becomes determined to shut them down.

Eduardo uses his former law skills, to plan a course of action for Frank and Emma to stay in business. Together they purchase the established, but on hiatus, Daddy Day Care from Charles "Charlie" Hinton. Charles recounts his attempts at success with the business, cautioning them in the unfortunate life-events that may follow. After purchasing the company, they attempt to register and rebrand the establishment as "Granddaddy Day Care". Upon doing so, they learn that there is a waiting period. After being fined by the city, due to the social worker's analysis, the Collins couple struggle to earn enough money to pay their debtors and the fines. Eduardo, who has shown the early stages of dementia, decides to help them sue the city. In court they present their case that they were not issued any warnings, nor Mr. Tooley's observations of the things they must change to meet city code. The judge adjourns in favor of Granddaddy Day Care, and the company continues to grow and flourish. Frank, Emma, their son, and Eduardo grow closer as a family over and realize how blessed their lives are. Frank meanwhile, has a new idea for a book. After writing and publishing the story, based on his new elderly friends, the tome once again becomes a best-seller.

== Main cast and characters ==
List indicator

This section includes characters who will appear or have appeared in the franchise in main roles.

- An empty grey cell indicates the character was not in the film, or that the character's official presence has not yet been confirmed.

Character	Films		
Character	Daddy Day Care	Daddy Day Camp	Grand-Daddy Day Care
Principal cast
Charles "Charlie" Hinton	Eddie Murphy	Cuba Gooding Jr.	Da'Vone McDonald
Phillip "Phil" Ryerson	Jeff Garlin	Paul Rae	
Kimberly "Kim" Hinton	Regina King	Tamala Jones	
Benjamin "Ben" Hinton	Khamani Griffin	Spencir Bridges	
Col. Buck Hinton		Richard Gant	
Maxwell "Max" Ryerson	Max Burkholder	Dallin Boyce	
Becca	Hailey Noelle Johnson	Molly Jepson	
Jennifer "Jenny"	Lacey Chabert		
Tony "the Flash"	Jimmy Bennett		
Crispin	Shane Baumel		
Jamie	Elle Fanning		
Dylan	Felix Archille		
Nicky	Arthur Young		
Juliette		Telise Galanis	
Robert		Tad D'Agostino	
Jack Mayhoffer		Talon Ackerman	
Billy		Tyger Rawlings	
Carl Warner		Taggart Hurtubise	
Mullet Head		Zachary Allen	
Eduardo "Eddie" Hernandez			Danny Trejo
Frank Collins			Reno Wilson
Emma Hernandez-Collins			Roxana Ortega
Jordan Collins			Anthony Gonzales
Gabe			Hal Linden
Blanche			Linda Gray
"Big" Lou			George Wendt
Bonnie			Julia Duffy
Millie			Margaret Avery
"Dynamite" Dan North			Barry Bostwick
Arnold			Garrett Morris
Walter			James Hong
Annie			Jayden Bartels
Supporting cast
Ms. Gwyneth Harridan	Anjelica Huston		
Marvin	Steve Zahn		
Bruce	Kevin Nealon		
Dale		Josh McLerran	
Uncle Morty		Brian Doyle-Murray	
Lance Warner		Lochlyn Munro	
Robert "Bobby J" Jefferson Warner		Sean Patrick Flaherty	
Ned Tooley			Alec Mapa
Judge Littles			Clint Howard
Jack Quartermaine			Ed Quinn

== Additional crew and production details ==
Film	Crew/Detail					
Film	Composer	Cinematographer	Editor(s)	Production companies	Distributing company	Running time
Daddy Day Care	David Newman	Steven Poster	Christopher Greenbury	Columbia Pictures, Revolution Studios, Davis Entertainment	Sony Pictures Releasing	1hr 32mins
Daddy Day Camp	Jim Dooley	Geno Salvatori	Michel Aller	TriStar Pictures, Revolution Studios, Davis Entertainment, Blue Star Entertainment	Sony Pictures Releasing	1hr 40mins
Grand-Daddy Day Care	Nora Kroll-Rosenbaum	Graham Robbins	Heath Ryan	Universal 1440 Entertainment, Revolution Studios, Pace Pictures	Universal Pictures Home Entertainment	1hr 36mins

== Reception ==
=== Box office and financial performance ===
Film	Box office gross			Box office ranking		Video sales gross	Worldwide gross income	Budget	Total worldwide net income	Ref.
Film	North America	Other territories	Worldwide	All time North America	All time worldwide	North America	Worldwide gross income	Budget	Total worldwide net income	Ref.
Daddy Day Care	$104,297,061	$60,136,806	$164,433,867	#690	#1,519	figure not available	$164,433,867	$60,000,000	$104,433,867	
Daddy Day Camp	$13,235,267	$4,974,605	$18,209,872	#4,534	#5,687	$3,585,486	$21,795,358	$6,000,000	$15,795,358	
Grand-Daddy Day Care	—N/a	—N/a	—N/a	—N/a	—N/a	$48,366	$48,366	figure not available	>$48,366	
Totals	$117,532,328	$65,111,411	$182,643,739	x̅ #1,741.33	x̅ #2,402	$3,633,852	$186,277,591	≥$66,000,000	$121,277,591	

=== Critical and public response ===
Film	Critical		Public
Film	Rotten Tomatoes	Metacritic	CinemaScore
Daddy Day Care	27% (131 reviews)	39/100 (31 reviews)	A−
Daddy Day Camp	1% (80 reviews)	13/100 (19 reviews)	B
Grand-Daddy Day Care	—N/a(2 reviews)	—N/a	—N/a
