= Writers Guild of America Award for Television: Children's Script =

Children's television awards

The Writers Guild of America Award for Television: Children’s Script is an award presented by the Writers Guild of America to the writers of children’s television. Separate categories for series, specials, and longform have been created.

== Winners and nominees ==
=== 1950s ===
==== Children’s Script ====
- 1957: Thelma Robinson with Claire Kennedy and Warren Wilson (story) – Lassie ("The Visitor") (CBS)
  - Lillie Hayward – The Mickey Mouse Club ("Spin and Marty") (ABC)
  - Dwight Babcock – Walt Disney Presents ("Tribute to Joel Chandler Harris") (ABC)
- 1958: Kenneth A. Enochs – Circus Boy ("Elmer the Rainmaker") (ABC)
  - Claire Kennedy – Lassie ("Transition") (CBS)
  - Craig P. Gilbert – Let's Take a Trip ("Pre-Inauguration") (CBS)
  - Harold Mehling – Let's Take a Trip ("Search for Antibiotics") (CBS)
  - Yasha Frank – Rexall Special ("Pinocchio") (NBC)

=== 1970s ===
==== Children’s Script ====
- 1976: Yanna Kroyt Brandt – Vegetable Soup ("The Superlative Horse") (NBC)
  - Tony Kayden – ABC Afterschool Special ("Fawn") (ABC)
  - Herbert Baker and Sylvia Fine Kaye – CBS Festival of Lively Arts for Young People ("Danny Kaye's Look-In at the Metropolitan Opera") (CBS)
  - W. W. Lewis – Go USA ("Go Away Kid: You Bother Me") (NBC)
- 1977: Arthur Barron – ABC Afterschool Special ("Blind Sunday") (ABC)
  - W. W. Lewis – NBC Special Treat ("Big Henry and the Polka Dot Kid") (NBC)
  - Jan Hartman – Bound for Freedom (NBC)
  - Alfa-Betty Olsen and Marshall Efron – God's Country ("Part II") (CBS)
- 1978: Art Wallace – Little Vic (ABC)
  - Jan Artman – ABC Afterschool Special ("Hewitt's Just Different") (ABC)
  - Jim Inman – ABC Afterschool Special ("The Pinballs") (ABC)
  - Jean Holloway – Once Upon a Brothers Grimm (CBS)
- 1979: Irma Reichert and Daryl Warner – ABC Afterschool Special ("Mom and Dad Can't Hear Me") (ABC)
  - Jon Stone and Joseph A. Bailey – Christmas Eve on Sesame Street (PBS)
  - Barra Grant – NBC Special Treat ("The Tap Dance Kid") (NBC)

=== 1980s ===
==== Children’s Script ====
- 1980: Edward Pomerantz – NBC Special Treat ("New York City Too Far From Tampa Blues") (NBC)
  - Jeffrey Kindley – ABC Afterschool Special ("Make Believe Marriage") (ABC)
  - Liz Coe – Friends ("Going Out") (ABC)
  - David R. Axelrod, Joseph A. Bailey, Andy Beckerman, Richard Camp, Sherry Coben, Bruce Hart, Carole Hart, and Marianne Meyer – Hot Hero Sandwich ("Show #4") (NBC)
- 1981: Paul A. Golding and David Irving (story) – Wonderful World of Disney ("The Secret of Lost Valley") (NBC)
  - Kimmer Ringwald – CBS Library ("Animal Talk") (CBS)
  - George Arthur Bloom – CBS Library ("The Incredible Book Escape") (CBS)
  - Edward Pomerantz – ABC Weekend Specials ("The Gold-Bug") (ABC)
- 1982: W. W. Lewis – NBC Special Treat ("Sunshine's On the Way") (NBC)
  - Jeffrey Kindley and Len Jenkin – ABC Afterschool Special ("Family of Strangers") (ABC)
  - Kimmer Ringwald – CBS Children’s Mystery Theatre ("The Treasure of Alpheus Winterborn") (CBS)
- 1983: Josef Anderson – CBS Afternoon Playhouse ("First Kill") (CBS)
  - Buz Kohan – ABC Afterschool Special ("Goldie and the Kids...Listen To Us") (ABC)
  - Jeri Taylor with Sydney Julien (story) – ABC Afterschool Special ("Please Don't Hit Me, Mom") (ABC)
  - Johnny Dawkins – ABC Afterschool Special ("The Wave") (ABC)
- 1984: Arthur Heinemann – ABC Afterschool Special ("The Woman Who Willed a Miracle") (ABC)
- 1984: Jon Stone and Joseph A. Bailey – Sesame Street ("Big Bird in China") (PBS)
  - Carole Hart, Bruce Hart, and Sherry Coben – NBC Special Treat ("Oh Boy! Babies!") (NBC)
- 1985: Jeffrey Kindley – ABC Afterschool Special ("The Great Love Experiment") (ABC)
  - Stephen H. Foreman – ABC Afterschool Special ("Cougar") (ABC)
  - Dianne Dixon – ABC Afterschool Special ("A Different Twist") (ABC)
  - Norman Stiles – Sesame Street ("Goodbye Mr. Hooper") (PBS)
- 1986: Charles Johnson and John Allman with Avon Kirkland (story) – WonderWorks ("Booker") (PBS)
  - Jeanne Betancourt – ABC Afterschool Special ("I Want To Go Home") (ABC)
  - Marisa Gioffre – Workin' For Peanuts (HBO)
- 1987: Nancy Audley with Christine Burrill and Richard Soto (story) – WonderWorks ("Maricela") (PBS)
  - Kathryn J. Montgomery & Jeffrey Auerbach – CBS Schoolbreak Special ("Babies Having Babies") (CBS)
  - Mick Garris – Wonderful World of Disney ("Fuzz Bucket") (ABC)
  - Mark Rosman – Wonderful World of Disney ("Time Flyer") (ABC)
- 1988: Joseph Maurer – CBS Schoolbreak Special ("An Enemy Among Us") (CBS)
  - Joanna Lee – CBS Schoolbreak Special ("Juvi") (CBS)
  - James Orr and Jim Cruickshank – Wonderful World of Disney ("Young Harry Houdini") (ABC)
- 1989: Blanche Hanalis – Hallmark Hall of Fame ("The Secret Garden") (CBS)
  - Victoria Hochberg – ABC Afterschool Special ("Just a Regular Kid: An AIDS Story") (ABC)
  - Joanna Lee – ABC Afterschool Special ("The Kid Who Wouldn't Quit: The Brad Silverman Story") (ABC)
  - Paul W. Cooper – CBS Schoolbreak Special ("Gangs") (CBS)
  - Kathryn J. Montgomery with Steve Faigenbaum (story) – CBS Schoolbreak Special ("Home Sweet Homeless") (CBS)
  - Everett Greenbaum and Harvey Bullock with Jim Shorts and Chris Solada (story) – A Mouse, A Mystery and Me (NBC)

=== 1990s ===
==== Children’s Script ====
- 1990: Bruce Harmon – ABC Afterschool Special ("Taking a Stand") (ABC)
  - Jeffrey Auerbach – CBS Schoolbreak Special ("No Means No") (CBS)
  - Paul W. Cooper – CBS Schoolbreak Special ("A Matter of Conscience") (CBS)
  - Alan L. Gansberg – CBS Schoolbreak Special ("My Past Is My Own") (CBS)
  - Jon Stone – Sesame Street ("Big Bird in Japan") (PBS)
- 1991: Josef Anderson – ABC Afterschool Special ("The Perfect Date") (ABC)
- 1991: Cynthia A. Cherbak, Elizabeth Hansen, and Herbert Stein – CBS Schoolbreak Special ("American Eyes") (CBS)
  - Harry Longstreet and Renee Longstreet – CBS Schoolbreak Special ("The Frog Girl: The Jenifer Graham Story") (CBS)
- 1992: Betty G. Birney – CBS Schoolbreak Special ("But He Loves Me") (CBS)
  - Michael Winship – 3-2-1 Contact ("Down the Drain") (PBS)
  - Gordon Rayfield – CBS Schoolbreak Special ("It's Only Rock and Roll") (CBS)
  - Paul W. Cooper – CBS Schoolbreak Special ("Abby, My Love") (CBS)
  - Joanna Lee and Annie Caroline Schuler – CBS Schoolbreak Special ("The Fourth Man") (CBS)
- 1993: Daryl Busby and Susan Amerikaner – Adventures in Wonderland ("Pretzelmania") (The Disney Channel)
  - Daryl Busby and Tom J. Astle – Adventures in Wonderland ("What Makes Rabbit Run?") (The Disney Channel)
  - Bruce Harmon – Lifestories: Families in Crisis ("Public Law 106: The Becky Bell Story") (HBO)
  - Carol Starr Schneider – CBS Schoolbreak Special ("Two Teens and a Baby") (CBS)
  - David D. Connell, James F. Thurman, Michael Winship, and Susan Kim – Mathnet ("The Case of the Calpurnian Kugle Caper") (PBS)
- 1994: Robert L. Freedman – Lifestories: Families in Crisis ("A Deadly Secret: The Robert Bierer Story") (HBO)
  - Daryl Busby and Deborah Raznick – Adventures in Wonderland ("Dinner Fit for a Queen") (The Disney Channel)
  - Daryl Busby and Tom J. Astle – Adventures in Wonderland ("Fiesta Time") (The Disney Channel)
  - Daryl Busby and Phil Baron – Adventures in Wonderland ("On a Roll") (The Disney Channel)
  - Daryl Busby and Daniel Benton – Adventures in Wonderland ("The Red Queen Crown Affair") (The Disney Channel)
  - Bruce Harmon – CBS Schoolbreak Special ("Love Off Limits") (CBS)
  - Willy Holtzman – Lifestories: Families in Crisis ("Blood Brothers: The Joey DiPaola Story") (HBO)
  - Michael Winship – Square One TV ("Sneaky Peeks") (PBS)
- 1995: Bruce Harmon – Lifestories: Families in Crisis ("The Coming Out of Heidi Leiter") (HBO)
- 1995: Carin Greenberg Baker with Kermit Frazier – Ghostwriter ("Don't Stop the Music") (PBS)
- 1995: Lynn Montgomery – Mrs. Piggle-Wiggle ("The Radish Cure") (Showtime)
- 1996: Gordon Rayfield – CBS Schoolbreak Special ("Stand Up") (CBS)
  - Philip J. Walsh, Barry Friedman, and Mark Waxman, with Richard Albrecht and Casey Keller – Beakman's World ("Sharks, Beakmania & Einstein") (CBS)
  - Pamela Douglas – CBS Schoolbreak Special ("Between Mother and Daughter") (CBS)
  - Carol Starr Schneider – CBS Schoolbreak Special ("Between Mother and Daughter") (CBS)
  - Tony Geiss – Sesame Street ("A Baby Worm Is Born") (PBS)
- 1997: Dan M. Angel and Billy Brown – Goosebumps ("The Cuckoo Clock of Doom") (FOX)
  - Courtney Flavin – ABC Afterschool Special ("Educating Mom") (ABC)
  - Mollie Fermaglich – Allegra's Window ("Strange Vetfellows") (Nickelodeon)
  - Eric Weiner – Gullah Gullah Island ("Look Who's Balking") (Nickelodeon)
  - Katherine Lawrence – Hypernauts ("Ice Bound") (ABC)
  - George Daugherty and Janis Diamond – Peter and the Wolf (ABC)
  - Ronnie Krauss – Reading Rainbow ("Fly Away Home") (PBS)
- 1998: Christine Ferraro and Tony Geiss – Elmo Saves Christmas (PBS)
- 1998: David Steven Cohen – The Wubbulous World of Dr. Seuss ("The Song of the Zubble-Wump") (Nickelodeon)
  - Tony Geiss – Sesame Street ("The Bountiful Tree") (PBS)
  - Gary Cooper and Allan Neuwirth – The Wubbulous World of Dr. Seuss ("The Great Mystery of Lake Winna-Bango") (Nickelodeon)
  - Will Ryan and Craig Shemin – The Wubbulous World of Dr. Seuss ("The Road To Ka-Larry") (Nickelodeon)
- 1999: Christine Ferraro – Sesame Street ("Telly as Jack") (PBS)
  - Jeff Schechter – Brink! (Disney Channel)
  - Susan Kim – The Mystery Files of Shelby Woo ("The Case of the MacBeth Mystery") (Nickelodeon)
  - Jeff Stetson – Nickelodeon Sports Theater ("First Time") (Nickelodeon)
  - William Robertson and Alex Zamm – Wonderful World of Disney ("My Date with the President's Daughter") (ABC)
  - Robert L. Freedman – Wonderful World of Disney ("Cinderella") (ABC)
  - John Martel – The Wubbulous World of Dr. Seuss ("The Cat In The Hat's First First-Day") (Nickelodeon)

=== 2000s ===
==== Children’s Script (2000-2005) ====
- 2000: Wendy Biller and Christopher Hawthorne – Sea People (Showtime)
  - Eric Weiner – Are You Afraid of the Dark? ("The Tale of the Secret Admirer") (Nickelodeon)
  - Eric Tuchman – Dear America ("A Journey to the New World") (HBO)
  - Susan Kim – The Mystery Files of Shelby Woo ("The Case of the Crooked Campaign") (Nickelodeon)
  - Shari Goodhartz – Young Hercules ("Hind Sight") (FOX)
- 2001: Paris Qualles – The Color of Friendship (Disney Channel)
- 2001: Rod Serling – A Storm in Summer (Showtime)
  - Mitchell Kriegman – Bear in the Big Blue House ("A Berry Bear Christmas") (Disney Channel)
  - Joel Kauffmann and Donald C. Yost – Miracle in Lane 2 (Disney Channel)
  - Christine Ferraro – Sesame Street ("The Big Bad Wolf Fills in for Goldilocks") (PBS)
- 2002: Anna Sandor – My Louisiana Sky (Showtime)
  - Jacqueline Feather and David Seidler – By Dawn's Early Light (Showtime)
  - Shari Goodhartz – Dragonheart: A New Beginning (Sci-Fi Channel)
  - Julie Nathanson – Just Deal ("Have Your Cake") (NBC)
  - Terri Minsky – Lizzie McGuire ("Pool Party") (Disney Channel)
- 2003: Gordon Rayfield – Our America (Showtime)
  - Christine Ferraro – Elmo's World: Happy Holidays! (PBS)
  - Glenn Gers – Off Season (Showtime)
  - Mark Saltzman and Jeffrey Rubin (story) – The Red Sneakers (Showtime)
- 2004: Paul W. Cooper – The Maldonado Miracle (Showtime)
  - Joel Silverman, Joel Kauffmann, and Donald C. Yost – Full-Court Miracle (Disney Channel)
  - Thom Eberhardt – I Was A Teenage Faust (Showtime)
  - Willie Reale and Mark Palmer – Out There ("Don't Look Back") (The N)
- 2005: Wendy Kesselman – A Separate Peace (Showtime)
  - Susan Shilliday – A Wrinkle in Time (ABC)

==== Long Form or Special ====
- 2006: Willy Holtzman – Edge of America (Showtime)
  - Jessica Sharzer and Ann Young Frisbie – Speak (Showtime)
- 2007: not awarded
  - Billy Brown and Dan Angel – The Haunting Hour: Don't Think About It (Cartoon Network)
- 2009: Polly Draper – The Naked Brothers Band ("Polar Bears") (Nickelodeon)

==== Episodic and Specials ====
- 2006: Kevin Arkadie – Miracle's Boys ("New Charlie") (The N)
  - Ronnie Krauss – Reading Rainbow ("Visiting Day") (PBS)
  - Christine Ferraro – Sesame Street ("Baby Bear's First Day of School") (PBS)
- 2007: Alana Sanko – Just For Kicks ("Meet The Power Strikers") (Nickelodeon)
  - DJ MacHale – Flight 29 Down ("Scratch") (Discovery Kids)
  - David Steven Cohen – Phil of the Future ("Broadcast Blues") (Disney Channel)
  - Ronnie Krauss – Reading Rainbow ("Show Way") (PBS)
  - Deborah Swisher – That's So Raven ("Fur Better Or Worse") (Disney Channel)
- 2008: DJ MacHale – Flight 29 Down ("Look Who's Not Talking") (Discovery Kids)
  - Polly Draper – The Naked Brothers Band ("Nat is a Stand Up Guy") (Nickelodeon)
- 2009: Joseph Mazzarino – Elmo's Christmas Countdown (ABC)
  - Scott Gray and Rick Gitelson – Imagination Movers ("The Un-Party") (Disney Channel)
  - Arika Lisanne Mittman – South of Nowhere ("Spencer's 18th Birthday") (The N)

=== 2010s ===
==== Long Form or Special ====
- 2010: Erik Patterson and Jessica Scott – Another Cinderella Story (ABC Family)
- 2011: Julie Sherman Wolfe and Amy Talkington – Avalon High (Disney Channel)
- 2012: not awarded
- 2013: Anne De Young and Ron McGee – Girl vs. Monster (Disney Channel)
- 2014: not awarded
- 2015: not awarded
- 2016: Josann McGibbon and Sara Parriott – Descendants (Disney Channel)
- 2017: Geri Cole and Ken Scarborough - Once Upon a Sesame Street Christmas (HBO)
  - Nick Turner, Rex New, and Cameron Fay - Dance Camp (YouTube)
  - Billy Brown and Dan Angel - R.L. Stine's Monsterville: Cabinet of Souls (Freeform)

==== Episodic and Specials ====
- 2010: Max Burnett – The Troop ("Welcome to the Jungle") (Nickelodeon)
  - Randi Barnes, Rick Gitelson, and Scott Gray – Imagination Movers ("A Monster Problem") (Disney Channel)
  - Scott Gray, Randi Barnes, Rick Gitelson, and Michael G. Stern – Imagination Movers ("Mouse And Home") (Disney Channel)
  - Joseph Mazzarino – Sesame Street ("Frankly, It's Becoming A Habitat") (PBS)
  - Christine Ferraro – Sesame Street ("Wild Nature Survivor Guy") (PBS)
  - Dan Kopelman – True Jackson, VP ("The Rival") (Nickelodeon)
- 2011: Scott Gray, Randi Barnes, Rick Gitelson, and Michael G. Stern – Imagination Movers ("Happy Ha-Ha Holidays") (Disney Channel)
  - Andy Gordon – True Jackson, VP ("True Magic") (Nickelodeon)
- 2012: Leo Chu and Eric S. Garcia – Supah Ninjas ("Hero Of The Shadows") (Nickelodeon)
  - Dan Schneider and Matt Fleckenstein – iCarly ("iLost My Mind") (Nickelodeon)
  - Jennifer Heftler, Randi Barnes, Rick Gitelson, Vivien Mejia, and Michael G. Stern – Imagination Movers ("The Prince Frog") (Disney Channel)
  - Joseph Mazzarino – Sesame Street ("The Good Birds Club") (PBS)
  - Max Burnett – The Troop ("Oh, Brother") (Nickelodeon)
  - Devin Bunje and Nick Stanton – Zeke and Luther ("Luther Turns 4") (Disney XD)
- 2013: Christine Ferraro – Sesame Street ("The Good Sport") (PBS)
- 2014: Vincent Brown – ANT Farm ("influANTces") (Disney Channel)
  - Jim Krieg – Spooksville ("The Haunted Cave") (Hub Network)
  - Christine Ferraro – Sesame Street ("Simon Says") (PBS)
- 2015: Bob Smiley – The Haunted Hathaways ("Haunted Heartthrob") (Nickelodeon)
  - Matthew Nelson – Girl Meets World ("Girl Meets 1961") (Disney Channel)
  - Boyce Bugliari and Jamie McLaughlin – The Haunted Hathaways ("Haunted Crushing" aka "Haunted Sisters") (Nickelodeon)
- 2016: Gretchen Enders and Aminta Goyel – Gortimer Gibbon's Life on Normal Street ("Gortimer, Ranger and Mel vs. The Endless Night") (Amazon)
  - Mark Blutman – Girl Meets World ("Girl Meets I am Farkle") (Disney Channel)
  - Garrett Frawley and Brian Turner – Gortimer Gibbon's Life on Normal Street ("Gortimer and the Surprise Signature") (Amazon)
  - David Anaxagoras and Luke Matheny – Gortimer Gibbon's Life on Normal Street ("Gortimer vs The Relentless Rainbow of Joy") (Amazon)
  - Laurie Parres – Gortimer Gibbon's Life on Normal Street ("Ranger and The Fabled Flower of Normal Street") (Amazon)
- 2017: Laurie Parres - Gortimer Gibbon's Life on Normal Street ("Mel vs. The Night Mare of Normal Street") (Amazon)
  - Joshua Jacobs and Michael Jacobs - Girl Meets World ("Girl Meets Commonism") (Disney Channel)
  - John-Paul Nickel - Just Add Magic ("Just Add Mom") (Amazon)
  - Belinda Ward - Sesame Street ("Mucko Polo, Grouch Explorer") (HBO)
