= List of The Troop episodes =

The following is a list of episodes for the Nickelodeon television series The Troop. The series premiered on September 12, 2009. The episodes are arranged in broadcast order.

== Series overview ==
Season	Episodes		Originally released		
Season	Episodes		First released	Last released	Network
1	26		September 12, 2009	August 21, 2010	Nickelodeon
2	14	7	June 25, 2011	August 6, 2011	Nickelodeon
2	14	7	October 29, 2012	May 8, 2013	Nicktoons

== Episodes ==
=== Season 1 (2009–10) ===
No. overall	No. in season	Title	Directed by	Written by	Original release date	Prod. code
1	1	"Pilot" "Welcome to the Jungle"	Peter Lauer	Max Burnett	September 18, 2009	101
The Troop must initiate its newest member, Jake, into its secret organization. Jake's nasty neighbors get turned to stone by a Basilisk.
2	2	"Do the Worm"	Paul Hoen	Sam Johnson & Chris Marcil	September 12, 2009	103
While saving the senior dance from a Mongolian death worm, Felix becomes an unlikely hero.
3	3	"Forest Grump"	Peter Lauer	Greg Coolidge	September 18, 2009	104
A tree monster is out for revenge and poses as a student in order to kill the student council.
4	4	"There Is No I in Monster Hunter"	Paul Hoen	Max Burnett	September 18, 2009	102
Jake learns the value of working as a team. After Hayley is mean-girled, she learns that although she wants to be loved by everyone, it's okay if she's not.
5	5	"Pajama Game...of Death"	Adam Weissman	Shawn Simmons	September 25, 2009	106
Jake and Felix have to infiltrate Hayley's cheerleader slumber party and find out which cheerleader is hosting a horrible bug monster.
6	6	"Taming of the Cube"	Pat Williams	Jenny Lee	October 2, 2009	107
While fighting a Gelatinous Cube monster, Hayley and Jake switch bodies and must deal with life as each other.
7	7	"No More Master Nice Guy"	Pat Williams	Pang-Ni Landrum	October 16, 2009	108
Hayley becomes suspicious when a mousy classmate suddenly gains status and power – which is revealed to be by controlling an invisible, subservient monster.
8	8	"The Great Punkin"	Adam Weissman	Harry Hannigan	October 23, 2009	105
On Halloween night, The Troop has to capture the monsters after the security system breaks down and the monsters escape.
9	9	"Tentacle Face"	Jon Rosenbaum	Julia Ruchman	November 13, 2009	109
Jake meets his monster-hunting hero, but discovers he's outgrowing the ability to hunt and capture the ultimate monster he has been chasing his whole career.
10	10	"Lost in Translation"	Peter Lauer	Thomas W. Lynch	November 20, 2009	111
A Troop from Japan arrives to share monster-hunting techniques with our Troop, but cultural differences complicate everyone's attempts at defeating the elusive Borlak.
11	11	"The Good, the Bad and the Ickie Doll"	Jon Rosenbaum	Jonas E. Agin	December 12, 2009	110
Jake and Hayley discover that the hot Christmas toy, the "Ickie Doll", has been invaded by a Vapor Monster, turning the dolls into nasty, violent, living creatures.
12	12	"The Substitute"	Adam Weissman	Erika Kaestle & Patrick McCarthy	January 9, 2010	114
When veteran Troop member Bianca Stonehouse replaces Mr. Stockley, The Troop discover that she is a monster in disguise.
13	13	"Unpleasantville"	Peter Lauer	Elizabeth Kruger & Craig Shapiro	January 16, 2010	112
A strange Swarm monster causes everyone in town to behave perfectly, The Troop learns that perfection is overrated.
14	14	"My Gus Is Back, and You're Gonna Be In Trouble"	Adam Weissman	Max Burnett	January 30, 2010	113
Felix's new friendship with Gus creates a rift within The Troop.
15	15	"Speed"	Jon Rosenbaum	Dan Martin	February 6, 2010	117
Jake and Hayley must pretend to be a couple in order to catch the Eris Fairy (Victoria Justice) that's been running around the school breaking up couples in love.
16	16	"I, Monster"	Jay Kogen	Sam Johnson & Chris Marcil	February 20, 2010	115
The Troop goes on lockdown until they can figure out which one of them is really a monster.
17	17	"Like a Moth to the Spotlight"	Jon Rosenbaum	Jenny Lee	March 13, 2010	116
While hunting a Vampire Moth, the Troop must alleviate the suspicions of two of their classmates who witnessed a monster fight, but cannot be Snarked.
18	18	"Vampsters"	Jon Rosenbaum	Shawn Simmons	March 20, 2010	125
When a group of vampire-hamster-human monsters invade Lakewood, Jake must infiltrate the group to find their lair.
19	19	"Snarked Up"	J.B. Sugar	Harry Hannigan	April 16, 2010	118
Jake is pregnant with a baby Snark, which makes his neck look weird. A griffin harasses local ranchers and Hayley and Felix have to take it out.
20	20	"Itty Bitty Baby Dragon"	Pat Williams	Pang-Ni Landrum	April 23, 2010	120
After Phoebe unwittingly "adopts" a baby dragon, Jake and the Troop must figure out how to return it before its mother finds them first.
21	21	"The Wrath of the Wraith"	J.B. Sugar	Shawn Simmons	July 17, 2010	119
Jake and two other students attempt to stay overnight in an abandoned hospital rumored to be haunted by a wraith.
22	22	"Hayley and Felix on the Side"	Pat Williams	Julia Ruchman	July 24, 2010	121
When Hayley and Felix are scratched by a Zylork, its venom makes them want to be eaten by the monster and Jake must save his friends from themselves.
23	23	"Double Felix"	Matthew Hastings	Harry Hannigan	July 31, 2010	122
Felix creates a robotic version of himself that is better at his life than he is, but evil. Hayley is bitten by a monster which gives her symptoms that make her seem very nerdy.
24	24	"Don't Talk to Dr. Cranius"	Jay Kogen	Sam Johnson & Chris Marcil	August 7, 2010	123
When Dr. Cranius, a Harvard-educated sponge, is captured by The Troop, he attempts to manipulate the members so he can escape. Emmy winning actor Kelsey Grammer guest stars
25	25	"Batteries Not Included"	Matthew Hastings	Thomas W. Lynch	August 14, 2010	124
Mr. Stockley, wants the day to go perfectly to demonstrate his skill as the new acting principal. But when an Oculypse escapes from HQ, it wreaks havoc on the student body.
26	26	"The Next Stop: Lakewood"	Jon Rosenbaum	Max Burnett	August 21, 2010	126
Gus is back from the mental hospital and he plans to destroy The Troop and take over Lakewood with a machine that control monsters.

=== Season 2 (2011–13) ===
On March 12, 2010, it was announced that The Troop was renewed for a second season. In addition, Malese Jow and Matt Shively joined the cast. David Del Rio left the cast after the second episode of this season due to other commitments. After numerous delays, the season premiered on Saturday, June 25, 2011. After airing the 7th episode of the second season, Nickelodeon put the show on indefinite hiatus. The remaining episodes began airing on Nicktoons in the United States, beginning on October 29, 2012. The remaining episodes were aired in the Netherlands, Belgium, Greece and Latin America. The last three episodes of the season aired from May 6–8, 2013 on Nicktoons.

No. overall	No. in season	Title	Directed by	Written by	Original release date	Prod. code
Nickelodeon
27	1	"The Triangle"	Jon Rosenbaum	Thomas W. Lynch	June 25, 2011	201
Cadence throws a monkey wrench into Jake and Hayley's blossoming relationship. Felix joins D.O.R.K., a secret club for geniuses.
28	2	"The Monster Within"	Jon Rosenbaum	Shawn Simmons	July 2, 2011	205
The Troop tries to find a monster hidden in their school. Felix gains undeserved notoriety for defeating a bully.
29	3	"It's All in the Game"	Patrick Williams	Andrew Hill Newman	July 9, 2011	206
Felix is promoted to Troop International HQ and is replaced by Kirby Bancroft Kadworth III. A video game is hypnotizing players to enter a Kaiju feeding portal.
30	4	"Mirrors"	Patrick Williams	Thomas W. Lynch	July 16, 2011	207
A monster living in mirrors causes trouble in the school. Jake meets his comic artist idol Lee Stanley, who expresses interest in Jake's stories.
31	5	"Oh, Brother"	Jon Rosenbaum	Max Burnett	July 23, 2011	208
Jake and Hayley recruit Etienne to be a temporary teammate during Felix and Kirby's transition. Cadence's brother, Chino comes to town.
32	6	"Through The Looking Glass"	Jon Rosenbaum	Max Burnett	July 30, 2011	209
Jake expels Cadence from the human world, but then he must enter the monster world in order to recover his portable Troop Grid that allows him to close portals. Meanwhile, Hayley and Etienne pretend there is a gas leak to keep the portal from being exposed, however other people gather around thinking that a popular band called Gas Leak is going to perform.
33	7	"Start Me Up"	Jay Kogen	Shawn Simmons	August 6, 2011	211
Morgan, Kirby's old rival joins The Troop from Tulsa and immediately challenges his chance of winning the science fair. She uses a small spark monster to power her butler robot that looks exactly like Kirby and turns evil and can't be defeated as Kirby defeats it when he traps in one of his inventions and captures the monster. Meanwhile, Jake and Hayley compete to get Cadence's other ticket for a boy band concert, New Young Boys but give the tickets to Mr. Stockley as they think he has a sister who likes them.
Nicktoons
34	8	"The Prisoner of Lakewood"	Carl Mason	Jay Kogen	October 29, 2012	202
A monster switches places with Hayley and realizes it easier to be a monster than a teenage girl. Kirby gets trained hard to become a good member of the Troop. Note: This episode was released on iTunes in August 2011 before it aired.
35	9	"Doom Hound"	Pat Williams	Harry Hannigan	October 29, 2012	203
Cadence and her friends accidentally release a deactivated Doom Hound.
36	10	"A Sniff Too Far"	Jay Kogen	Max Burnett	October 30, 2012	204
A Flaying Pincer Mole has been attacking the school repeatedly and the only way to find its lair is to team up with the Sniffer... an incredibly annoying monster. Note: This episode was released on iTunes in August 2011 before it aired.
37	11	"Eris Returns"	Pat Williams	Julia Ruchman	October 30, 2012	210
Cecilia, an Eris Fairy (Daniella Monet) returns and mistakes Etienne for Felix and they become a couple. Cecilia's ex-boyfriend, Tod comes from the monster world to get her back and get rid of Etienne. Note: This episode was released on iTunes in August 2011 before it aired.
38	12	"This Bird You Cannot Change"	Jon Rosenbaum	Andrew Hill Newman	May 6, 2013	212
An electric-eating Klox threatens Lakewood and the school prom.
39	13	"Road Trip (aka "The Kiss")"	Jon Rosenbaum	Harry Hannigan	May 7, 2013	213
Jake, Hayley and Mr. Stockley get a distress call from another Troop team during driver's ed training. Meanwhile Kirby runs for Green Czar and Cadence helps him win against Mazie (Ashley Argota).
40	14	"Ice Hassles"	Jon Rosenbaum	Julia Ruchman	May 8, 2013	214
Cadence sees an opportunity to prove her worth when The Troop is attacked by an ice monster.
