= Daddy Day Camp =

2007 film by Fred Savage

- Theatrical release poster
- Directed by: Fred Savage
- Screenplay by: Geoff Rodkey; J. David Stem; David N. Weiss
- Story by: Geoff Rodkey; Joel Cohen; Alec Sokolow
- Based on: Characters by Geoff Rodkey
- Produced by: William Sherak; Jason Shuman
- Starring: Cuba Gooding Jr.; Lochlyn Munro; Richard Gant; Tamala Jones; Paul Rae; Brian Doyle-Murray
- Cinematography: Geno Salvatori
- Edited by: Michel Aller
- Music by: Jim Dooley
- Production companies: TriStar Pictures; Revolution Studios; Davis Entertainment
- Distributed by: Sony Pictures Releasing
- Release date: August 8, 2007
- Running time: 89 minutes
- Country: United States
- Language: English
- Budget: $6 million
- Box office: $18.2 million

Daddy Day Camp (also known as Daddy Day Care 2) is a 2007 American children's comedy film directed by Fred Savage in his feature film directorial debut. It is the sequel to Daddy Day Care (2003). The film stars Cuba Gooding Jr., who replaces Eddie Murphy from the first film, with a supporting cast of Lochlyn Munro, Richard Gant, Tamala Jones, Paul Rae, and Brian Doyle-Murray. The film follows Charlie Hinton from the first film as he and his cohorts attempt to save their childhood day-camp by entering the Camp Olympiad.

Daddy Day Camp was produced by Revolution Studios and released by TriStar Pictures, unlike its predecessor, which was distributed by Columbia Pictures. The film was theatrically released in the United States on August 8, 2007. Despite being a modest box-office success, it was panned by critics who criticized its gross-out humor, screenplay, performances (primarily of Gooding), and Savage's direction. It is considered to be one of the worst movies ever made, as well as one of the worst sequels ever produced.

A third and final film, Grand-Daddy Day Care, was released direct-to-video in 2019.

== Plot ==
Charlie Hinton and Phil Ryerson take their respective sons, Ben and Max, to Camp Driftwood for the summer, a camp where they attended as kids in 1977. Once they arrive there, they discover that Driftwood is now falling to ruins and also no longer a kindhearted campsite. To save the site, Charlie and Phil buy a partnership from Morty, their childhood camp counselor. Morty then hands the campsite over to them, along with new bus driver Dale, and eagerly drives off on a vacation, after running the camp for 30 years without one. Meanwhile, Lance Warner, Charlie's childhood rival, runs the luxurious rival camp, Camp Canola. He has a son, Bobby J, although he repeatedly denies it and is eager to purchase Camp Driftwood and demolish it. Lance challenges Driftwood to compete in the upcoming Camp Olympiad, but Charlie refuses, recalling his childhood loss to Lance in the same competition. The first day of camp turns chaotic, including a skunk incident caused by Max and an accidental explosion when Phil drops a match in the bathroom after the light goes out.

As a result of the disastrous first day, most parents withdraw their kids from Camp Driftwood and request refunds. However, Charlie and Phil have already spent the money on repairs, leaving them with only nine campers including their sons instead of the original 35. Desperate for help, Charlie reluctantly calls his military father, Colonel Buck Hinton, to whip the kids into shape and restore order. The next day, Driftwood is raided by campers from Camp Canola, who steal the Driftwood flag. When Buck arrives, he begins training the remaining campers using his strict, military-style methods. After another raid and further taunting from Canola, Buck becomes determined to help Driftwood reclaim its pride and recover the stolen flag by engaging a food fight and tearing off Lance's pants. Lance later appears and mocks Charlie over his teaching methods, recalling their rivalry from the Camp Olympiad they competed in as kids. In response, Charlie accepts Lance's challenge to compete again in the upcoming Olympiad, and the Driftwood campers begin training. During the preparations, the kids start to admire Buck for his disciplined, military-style approach, while Charlie disapproves, not wanting them to adopt his father's rigid attitude. Charlie believes that Buck values toughness above all else and still sees him as a disappointment. Tension rises when Ben runs away into the woods after being teased by fellow campers Mullet Head and Billy for his father's overprotectiveness, echoing Buck's earlier story of becoming "tough" by running off as a child. After finding Ben, Charlie vents his frustration about Buck to Phil, unaware that Buck overhears the conversation and quietly leaves the camp.

On the day of the Camp Olympiad, the campers discover that Buck has left, leaving them demoralized. Determined to restore their confidence, Charlie sets out to find Buck, reconciles with him at the train station, and convinces him to return. Upon their arrival, the Driftwood campers report that they learned Camp Canola has been cheating in the competition—something that may have also occurred during the 1977 Olympiad, which Lance had won. Buck devises a plan to outsmart Canola in the remaining events, and Driftwood advances through the finals. During the baton relay, Mullet Head is set to climb the obstacle wall while Max runs the sprint against Bobby J. However, after Mullet Head injures his ankle in an earlier race, Charlie allows Ben to take his place, trusting his instincts as a climber. Although Ben initially falls, his friends encourage him to keep going. Becca soon discovers that Lance had greased the wall to sabotage Driftwood—revealing that he had been cheating for years. Using a nearby tree to reach the top, Ben rings the bell just in time, securing Driftwood's victory and earning Charlie's pride.

After the competition, Lance berates Bobby J for losing the Olympiad. Insulted and tired of his father's abuse and mistreatment, Bobby J stands up to Lance by kicking him in the shin, causing Lance to stumble backward into the rock wall's supports. The wall collapses onto a trophy display, destroying all of Camp Canola's past awards. Lance breaks down in tears as the Driftwood campers celebrate their victory. Many of the parents, including the staff who had withdrawn their kids and those who originally sent them to Canola, decide to tell Charlie that Driftwood provides a better example for their kids and ask him to re-enroll them as soon as possible and giving them employment, saving the camp from foreclosure. By the end of the film, Driftwood then proudly claims their championship trophy.

== Cast ==
- Cuba Gooding Jr. as Charlie Hinton, the co-owner of Daddy Day Care and Daddy Day Camp and teacher. He was played by Eddie Murphy in the original film.
- Lochlyn Munro as Lance Warner, Charlie's childhood enemy and the arrogant, hillbilly owner of the rival camp Canola.
- Richard Gant as Col. Buck Hinton, Charlie's estranged father. He is a military officer who takes army tasks very seriously, but he displays a soft spot for his grandson, Ben, as well as the other campers.
- Paul Rae as Phil Ryerson, co-owner of Daddy Day Care and Daddy Day Camp, Charlie's best friend. He was played by Jeff Garlin in the original film.
- Tamala Jones as Kim Hinton, Charlie's wife. She was played by Regina King in the original film.
- Joshua McLerran as Dale, an oafish young counselor at Camp Driftwood and the driver for the camp's bus.
- Spencir Bridges as Ben Hinton, Charlie's son, Becca and Max's best friend, and a student at Daddy Day Camp. He was played by Khamani Griffin in the original film.
- Brian Doyle-Murray as "Uncle" Morty, former owner of Camp Driftwood.
- Dallin Boyce as Max Ryerson, Phil's son and Becca and Ben's best friend and a student at Daddy Day Camp. He was played by Max Burkholder in the original film.
- Telise Galanis as Juliette Stone, one of the campers whom Robert likes.
- Molly Jepson as Becca, a smart girl who is Max and Ben's best friend from when they first met in Daddy Day Care four years prior, and a student at Daddy Day Camp. She was played by Hailey Noelle Johnson in the original film.
- Sean Patrick Flaherty as Robert "Bobby" Jefferson Warner, Lance's bratty, brainless, and equally arrogant son, whom he denies having since he hates kids.
- Taggart Hurtubise as Carl, the more independent six-year-old brother of Robert.
- Tad D'Agostino as Robert, a shy, nerdy, and socially awkward boy who falls for Juliette.
- Tyger Rawlings as Billy, a heavyweight bully, who likes to make other people bleed.
- Talon G. Ackerman as Jack Mayhoffer, a nerdy boy (and presumably, the youngest of all the campers). He has a very weak stomach and vomits easily.
- Zachary Allen as Archibald "Mullet Head" Mapleton, a rebellious but athletic boy with a mullet hairdo.
- Jennifer Lyon as Mrs. Simmons

== Production ==
In August 2003, following the release of Daddy Day Care, Eddie Murphy was lured into making a sequel, although he hadn't signed up for the film.

== Reception ==
=== Box office ===
Daddy Day Camp grossed $13.2 million in the United States and Canada, and $4.9 million in other territories, for a worldwide total of $18.2 million.

On its opening day, Daddy Day Camp grossed $773,706, and earned $3,402,678 on its opening weekend across more than 2,000 screens, ranking ninth at the box office. The film went on to gross $18.2 million worldwide, which was considered a modest box office performance relative to its production budget.

=== Critical response ===
On Rotten Tomatoes, Daddy Day Camp holds an approval rating of 1% based on 80 reviews with an average rating of 2.6/10. The site's critical consensus reads: "A mirthless, fairly desperate family film, Daddy Day Camp relies too heavily on bodily functions for comedic effect, resulting in plenty of cheap gags but no laughs." On Metacritic, the film has a weighted average score of 13 out of 100, based on 19 critics, indicating "overwhelming dislike". Audiences polled by CinemaScore gave the film an average grade of "B" on an A+ to F scale.

Nathan Rabin from The A.V. Club gave the film a rare "F" grade, concluding his review by saying: "All that's left is a generic time-waster powered by a lazy, cynical combination of scatological kiddie humor and maudlin sentiment." Richard Roeper gave the film a "thumbs down" on At the Movies, with Roeper panning the film's child actors and Gooding's performance. Kyle Smith of New York Post gave the film 0.5 out of 4 stars, panning Gooding's performance as "incompetent" and "epileptic", and the film's writing for its lack of humor. Rachel Biggs from IGN gave the film a 1 out of 10, saying: "It's just that there was nothing innovative about Daddy Day Camp — the jokes were flat, the kids unauthentic, and ultimately, the film lacked heart."

In 2020, a Rotten Tomatoes list considered the film the 15th worst sequel of all time. As of 2025, it is the 44th lowest rated film on the site.

=== Accolades ===
Award	Category	Subject	Result
Golden Raspberry Awards	Worst Actor	Cuba Gooding Jr.	Nominated
Golden Raspberry Awards	Worst Screenplay	Geoff Rodkey	Nominated
Golden Raspberry Awards	Worst Screenplay	J. David Stem	Nominated
Golden Raspberry Awards	Worst Screenplay	David N. Weiss	Nominated
Golden Raspberry Awards	Worst Picture	William Sherak	Nominated
Golden Raspberry Awards	Worst Picture	Jason Shuman	Nominated
Golden Raspberry Awards	Worst Director	Fred Savage	Nominated
Golden Raspberry Awards	Worst Prequel or Sequel		Won

=== Home media ===
Daddy Day Camp was released on DVD on January 29, 2008, by Sony Pictures Home Entertainment.
