= Daddy Day Care =

2003 film by Steve Carr

- Theatrical release poster
- Directed by: Steve Carr
- Written by: Geoff Rodkey
- Produced by: John Davis; Wyck Godfrey; Matt Berenson
- Starring: Eddie Murphy; Jeff Garlin; Steve Zahn; Regina King; Anjelica Huston
- Cinematography: Steven Poster
- Edited by: Christopher Greenbury
- Music by: David Newman
- Production companies: Columbia Pictures; Revolution Studios; Davis Entertainment
- Distributed by: Sony Pictures Releasing
- Release date: May 9, 2003 (United States)
- Running time: 92 minutes
- Country: United States
- Language: English
- Budget: $60 million
- Box office: $164.4 million

Daddy Day Care is a 2003 American family comedy film starring Eddie Murphy, Jeff Garlin, Steve Zahn, Regina King, and Anjelica Huston. Written by Geoff Rodkey and directed by Steve Carr, it marks Murphy and Carr's second collaboration after Dr. Dolittle 2 (2001). The plot follows two fathers who start a child day care center out of their home after they are laid off from their corporate jobs.

The film was produced by Columbia Pictures, Revolution Studios and Davis Entertainment and released in the United States on May 9, 2003, by Sony Pictures Releasing. It received generally negative reviews from critics, but was a box office success, grossing $164.4 million worldwide on a budget of $60 million. The film was followed by two sequels, in the film series of the same name.

== Plot ==
Charlie Hinton is a marketing executive at a local food company called Ample Foods. He and his wife, Kim, have just enrolled their son Ben into Chapman Academy, an overly academic preschool overseen by the haughty Gwyneth Harridan. However, on Ben's first day, Charlie, his best friend Phil Ryerson, and 300 other employees are laid off when the company shuts down their health division due to the poor reception of their vegetable-flavored breakfast cereals. Charlie breaks the news to Kim and Ben during dinner that night, but assures them that he will find a new job.

While Kim supports the family by returning to work as a lawyer, Charlie, after six weeks of job hunting and finding nothing, is forced by the bank to take Ben out of Chapman. Unable to find a satisfactory alternative around town, Charlie decides to open a daycare center of his own in his home with the help of Phil, calling it "Daddy Day Care". Although local parents are suspicious of men working with kids, a few choose their service as it is more affordable and child-based.

Charlie and Phil open Daddy Day Care with nine children and struggle with chaos and personal issues. Angered at losing children to the new competition, Harridan attempts to shut them down by notifying child services. Charlie and Phil find themselves rectifying problems pointed out by Dan Kubitz, a well-meaning child services director, to ensure that Daddy Day Care is suitable for children. Charlie and Phil then hire their former nerdy colleague, Marvin, as an additional care provider after Daddy Day Care acquires two more children. In time, they start to enjoy running Daddy Day Care as it grows in popularity, with Charlie delighted to see Ben making friends and enjoying himself.

After Daddy Day Care acquires three more children, Kubitz points out that a family home cannot accommodate more than 12 children. He suggests that Daddy Day Care either remove two kids or find a permanent facility elsewhere. Not willing to remove any of the children, Charlie chooses the latter option. Marvin knows about a suitable vacant building, but they cannot afford it, so Daddy Day Care decides to hold a fundraiser to earn the necessary capital. However, Harridan learns about the event and sabotages it with help from her hesitant assistant Jennifer. As a result, Daddy Day Care does not raise enough money to pay for the building.

Eventually, the food company offers Charlie and Phil their old jobs back at double their salaries, having decided to rehire them and letting them run an entire division after acting on an earlier idea that Charlie had sarcastically suggested. Harridan also offers to take in their children for a more affordable price if Daddy Day Care shuts down. Charlie and Phil reluctantly accept the offer, leaving Marvin heartbroken and refusing to join them. Ben is also disappointed when Charlie tells him he has to go back to Chapman. At the marketing meeting the next day, Charlie questions his decision after realizing the impact Daddy Day Care has had on Ben and the other children. Deciding that Ben is the most important thing to him, Charlie quits, convincing Phil to join him and his plans of reopening Daddy Day Care. Informing Marvin of their plans, Charlie confronts Harridan during a student orientation and tells the parents in attendance how little she cares about their children. After mentioning how much Daddy Day Care changed and helped the children, Charlie declares that Daddy Day Care is reopened and convinces the parents to return.

Six months later, Daddy Day Care manages to buy the building it needs to expand and prospers with Charlie and Phil successful, Jennifer now working for the center, and Marvin entering a relationship with one of the moms. With Chapman no more, Harridan is forced to work as a crossing guard. When one of her former students, Crispin, gives Harridan a flower, it attracts bees, causing her to wave the stop sign to shoo them away and inadvertently create a traffic jam.

== Cast ==
- Eddie Murphy as Charlie Hinton
- Jeff Garlin as Phil Ryerson
- Steve Zahn as Marvin
- Regina King as Kim Hinton
- Kevin Nealon as Bruce
- Anjelica Huston as Miss Gwyneth Harridan
- Jonathan Katz as Mr. Dan Kubitz
- Siobhan Fallon Hogan as Peggy
- Lisa Edelstein as Bruce's wife and Crispin's mother
- Lacey Chabert as Jennifer
- Laura Kightlinger as Sheila Ryerson
- Leila Arcieri as Kelli
- Khamani Griffin as Ben Hinton
- Max Burkholder as Max Ryerson
- Jimmy Bennett as Tony / Flash
- Shane Baumel as Crispin
- Elle Fanning as Jamie
- Felix Achille as Dylan
- Hailey Noelle Johnson as Becca
- Arthur Young as Nicky
- Wallace Langham as Jim Fields
- Mark Griffin as Steve

Cheap Trick appear as themselves at the Rock for Daddy Day Care charity event when they perform "Surrender".

== Production ==
The film was initially set up at 20th Century Fox, but Fox placed the film into turnaround due to budget concerns. It sold the film to Revolution Studios.

Shooting began on August 1, 2002, in Los Angeles, California and concluded on November 22.

The film's poster was officially released in December of that year, with the tagline, D-Day is coming.

== Reception ==
=== Critical response ===
On the review aggregator website Rotten Tomatoes, 27% of 131 critics' reviews are positive, with an average rating of 4.6/10. The website's consensus reads: "Daddy Day Care does its job of babysitting the tots. Anyone older will probably be bored." Metacritic, which uses a weighted average, assigned the film a score of 39 out of 100, based on 31 critics, indicating "generally unfavorable" reviews. Audiences polled by CinemaScore gave the film an average grade of "A−" on an A+ to F scale.

Todd McCarthy from Variety called it "scarcely more amusing than spending ninety minutes in a pre K classroom" and a "comically undernourished junk food snack".

=== Box office ===
Despite the negative critical ratings, the film was a box office success, grossing over $160 million worldwide based on a $60 million budget. The film was released in the United Kingdom on July 11, 2003, and opened at No. 3, behind Charlie's Angels: Full Throttle and Bruce Almighty. The next two weekends, the film moved down one place, before finally ending up at No. 10 on August 1.

== Sequels ==
Soon after the release of Daddy Day Care, Eddie Murphy was rumored to be involved in a sequel film, although he had not signed up for one. A sequel was released on August 8, 2007, titled Daddy Day Camp, with Cuba Gooding Jr. replacing Murphy as Charlie Hinton and Sony once again distributing the film (this time under TriStar). The film was panned by critics, with a 1% rating on Rotten Tomatoes. It won the Razzie Award for "Worst Prequel or Sequel". Another sequel, Grand-Daddy Day Care, was released on February 5, 2019, by Universal Pictures Home Entertainment on direct-to-video format. Da'Vone McDonald portrayed Charlie Hinton, who appears as a supporting character.
