= Possums (film) =

- Directed by: Max Burnett
- Written by: Max Burnett
- Produced by: Leanna Creel; Michael Burns
- Starring: Mac Davis; Greg Coolidge; Andrew Prine; Cynthia Sikes; Dennis Burkley
- Cinematography: Chris Duskin
- Edited by: Richard Halsey
- Music by: Justin Burnett
- Production companies: HSX Films; Ignite Entertainment; The Kushner-Locke Company
- Distributed by: Monarch Home Video; Lionsgate Films (current)
- Release date: June 13, 1998
- Running time: 97 minutes
- Country: United States
- Language: English
- Budget: $1,400,000 (estimated)

Possums is a 1998 sports comedy film directed by Max Burnett.

== Plot ==
When a small town votes to disband the local football team, the Possums, a radio announcer begins announcing imaginary radio games which the Possums win causing the real state champs to challenge the Possums to a game.

== Cast ==
- Mac Davis - Wilbur "Will" Clark
- Greg Coolidge - Jake Malloy
- Cynthia Sikes - Elizabeth Clark
- Andrew Prine - Mayor Charlie Lawton
- Dennis Burkley - Orville Moss
- Monica Creel - Sarah Jacobs
- Jay Underwood - John Clark
- Barry Switzer - Prattville Pirates Coach
