= The Turkey Bowl =

2019 comedy film directed by Greg Coolidge

- Film poster
- Directed by: Greg Coolidge
- Written by: Greg Coolidge; Kirk Ward
- Produced by: Tanner Anderson; Chad Bishoff; Greg Coolidge; Anthony Fitzgerald; Erich Hover; Kirk Ward
- Starring: Ryan Hansen; Matt Jones; Alan Ritchson; Kristen Hager
- Cinematography: Carlos González
- Edited by: Tom Lewis
- Music by: John Swihart
- Production company: Make It Take It Productions
- Distributed by: Lionsgate
- Release date: November 15, 2019
- Running time: 120 minutes
- Country: United States
- Language: English

The Turkey Bowl is a 2019 American sports comedy film directed by Greg Coolidge, and starring Ryan Hansen and Matt Jones. The film was released by Lionsgate in the United States on November 15, 2019, through theaters and on conventional and digital video on demand platforms.

== Synopsis ==
Tricked into returning after being falsely told his high school buddy Mitchell died in a car accident, Patrick Hodges—a former high school quarterback-turned-Chicago businessman who is (unofficially) engaged to Ashley Sinclair, the daughter of a U.S. Senator considering running for president—is lured back to his Oklahoma hometown of Putnam over Thanksgiving weekend to help his old friends finish The Turkey Bowl, a legendary football game between his alma mater Putnam Badgers and the crosstown rival Noble Knights (who went on to win the state championship that year) that was suspended in the second half during a freak snowstorm 15 years before. He is forced to do this task by Judge Tibbins, a former coach at Putnam, as a condition of release following his arrest by fellow classmate-turned-cop Fish for confessing to pushing former Knights quarterback Ronnie Best, now a prominent land developer, through the glass door during a melee outside the Badger Hole, the town bar owned by Patrick's former teammate "Fat Jack".

Adding to the pressure to win, Patrick's friends make a bet with Ronnie to give him the bar if they lose, but if they win Ronnie must agree to stop developing on their side of town. There, Patrick reunites with his former girlfriend Jennifer Harrison, who now works as senior vice president at Ronnie's company (and had previously dated her boss off-and-on before Patrick's return) and realizes she still has lingering feelings for her high school sweetheart.

Patrick and his former teammates realize that time has taken its toll on them, as they struggle during practice. Patrick recruits his friends to sneak their now-senile ex-football coach, who randomly spouts inspirational speeches and asks if the game has started at inopportune times, from a local nursing home to help bring some inspiration to the lagging squad. Ronnie, who is jealous of Patrick hanging around Jen and is fearful about the damage to his reputation if Noble loses the rematch, offers Patrick to leave town by buying him a plane ticket in exchange for letting Fat Jack's stay open; after finding out Patrick rebuffed the offer, Ronnie breaks into Putnam's locker room to sabotage the team by burning their equipment, accidentally setting it and the school's football field ablaze in the process.

During a party at his parents' house while his parents are out of town, Jen walks in Patrick as he is being seduced by Ronnie's lecherous twin sister Brandy Best, who has had a crush on him since they were teenagers; while trying to explain, Patrick inadvertently reveals his lament of having to be stuck replaying a football game with friends he has not seen in years and that he still has feelings for Jen. When Patrick is caught trying to sneak out of town after his parents ground their adult son for throwing the party. He is confronted by Mitchell about his distancing from his friends, revealing he did not want to be the ex-high school football star stuck reliving his glory days and wanted a better life. After discovering the destroyed field, Mitchell convinces a neighbor to hold the game in her yard where they played as kids.

Realizing he missed his family and friends; Patrick skips his flight back to Chicago and arrives at the game with Coach—whom he spotted wandering on a highway—as his Putnam teammates have fallen behind the Noble alumni. Putnam mounts a comeback led by Hodges and defeats Noble, 26–21. Ashley—whom Patrick had been trying to hide his real reason for being back home until Sen. Sinclair hears of his son-in-law-to-be's arrest on the news—tries to get Patrick back to Chicago, but he decides to stay and breaks up with her. As the team celebrates their victory at the Badger Hole, he admits to Jen that she is the reason he tried to avoid coming home and the reason he's staying; Patrick and Jen kiss, before joining their friends inside.

== Cast ==
- Ryan Hansen – Patrick Hodges
- Matt Jones – Mike Mitchell
- Alan Ritchson – Ronnie Best
- Leah McKendrick – Brandy Best
- Kristen Hager – Jennifer "Jen" Harrison
- Tanner Anderson – Santino "Sonny D" Divincenzo
- Ashley Fink – Cammie Newton
- Da'Vone McDonald – Trevor Ledbetter
- Travis Nicholson – Dale Fish
- Chris Reed – Chris "Fat" Jack
- Harland Williams – Nolan
- Renee Gauthier – Dana Newton
- Brett Cullen – Ed Hodges
- Michele Little – Marlene Hodges
- Blair Bomar – Ashley Sinclair
- Barry Switzer – Coach McKinney
- Kevin M. Brennan – Gene
- John Beasley – Judge Tibbins
- Sean McGraw – Sen. Sinclair
- Laurie Cummings – Mrs. Sinclair
- Leesa Neidel – Badger Cheerleader
- Oscar Seung – Co-Worker #1
- Erich Hover- Co-Worker #2
- Jake Washburn – Shimmy
- Alex Atkinson – Noble Knight #59
- Justin Parks - Noble Knight #33
- Anthony Fitzgerald – Jewelry Store Salesman
- Glenda Radigonda- CEO
- Darryl Cox (actor)- News Anchor
- Bruce Davis- Fire Chief
- OvaJean Siemens- Mrs. Vogel
- Graham Sean Weatherspoon II- Noble Knights Center/Nose Tackle
- Burns Burns- Kenny
- Steve Crawford- Drum Major
- Madilyn Kellam- Little Party Girl

== Release ==
The film was released in select theaters and on VOD and digital platforms on November 15, 2019. Then it was released on DVD on January 14, 2020.

== Soundtrack ==
- "Every Bosa" - Dick Walter
- "Don Giovanni Overture" - Wolfgang Amadeus Mozart
- "King of the World" - Jerry Honigman
- "Semi-Charmed Life" - Third Eye Blind
- "Where the Party At" - Hip-Hop Party League
- "All Star (song) - Smash Mouth
- "The Impression That I Get" - The Mighty Mighty Bosstones
- "No Rain" - Blind Melon
- "Time Passes By" - Affordable Lawn Care
- "Warm Beer" - Steve Adamczyk
- "Get Up" - Demrick
- "Oklahoma Rimshot" - The Bob Mcgregor Band
- "New Girl" - Analogue Revolution
