= Simon (American TV series) =

- Genre: Sitcom
- Created by: Danny Jacobson
- Directed by: Ellen Gittelsohn
- Starring: Harland Williams; Jason Bateman; Andrea Bendewald; Patrick Breen
- Composer: Stewart Levin
- Country of origin: United States
- Original language: English
- No. of seasons: 1
- No. of episodes: 21 (5 unaired)

Production
- Producer: Harland Williams
- Camera setup: Multi-camera
- Running time: 30 minutes
- Production companies: In Front Productions; TriStar Television

Original release
- Network: The WB
- Release: September 10, 1995 – February 18, 1996

Simon is an American sitcom television series created by Danny Jacobson, that was produced by In Front Productions and TriStar Television and aired on The WB from September 10, 1995 to February 18, 1996.

== Premise ==
A former Wall Street stockbroker moves to Harlem to live with his simple brother Simon.

== Cast ==
- Harland Williams as Simon Himple
- Jason Bateman as Carl Himple
- Andrea Bendewald as Libby Keeler
- Patrick Breen as Mitch Lowen
- Paxton Whitehead as Duke Stone
- Clifton Powell as John Doe

== Production ==
Simon began airing on September 10, 1995, and has a 30-minute run time. Its premiere marked The WB's addition of a second evening in the week for airing shows. The WB initially commissioned 13 episodes for the series from the production companies In Front Productions and TriStar Television. Ellen Gittelsohn directed the series, which was executive produced by Donald Todd, Danny Jacobson, and Marjorie Weitzman and produced by Walter Barnett. Stewart Levin composed the music, Robert Strohmaier was the art director, Vince Humphrey was the editor, and Alan Walker was the director of photography. The pilot episode featured Peter Dobson as Carl Himple, but later episodes had Jason Bateman in the role.

== Reception ==
In a mixed review, The Plain Dealer television critic Tom Feran said Simon's television pilot "is slightly overloaded and tries a bit too hard" and called it "a dumb domestic comedy grafted onto a Dumb and Dumber workplace comedy". He liked some aspects of the pilot, writing, "The broadly played workplace scenes offer some real laughs. Simon's so-dumb-it's-smart attitude becomes almost endearing, and there's a real cleverness lurking in the script." Giving the television series 2.5 stars, the Minnesota Star Tribune reviewers Noel Holston and Neal Justin wrote, "Like (Forrest) Gump, WB's Simon is dumb but likable."

Walt Belcher of The Tampa Tribune enjoyed the numerous callbacks to classic television series but found the show to be slightly "silly". He concluded, "Kids will love this one but it's likely to get lost on WB, which has yet to establish itself." The Christian Science Monitor's Judy Nichols found Simon Himple's "lethargic voice" to be "really tiresome" and called the show "cliched humor". The Hollywood Reporter critic Miles Beller praised the performances of Harland Williams and Jason Bateman but criticized the show's premiere for tending "more toward the indulgent and forced, an effort to wring humor out of everydayness that fails to connect as something based on resonating experience".

== Episodes ==
No.	Title	Directed by	Written by	Original release date	Viewers (millions)
1	"Watch This"	Ellen Gittelsohn	Danny Jacobson	September 10, 1995	3.3
Simon gets a job at a cable TV network.
2	"Simon Goes on a Date"	Rob Schiller	Donald Todd	September 17, 1995	N/A
Simon and Libby go out on a date. Carl finds a job as a balloon salesman.
3	"Simon Gets a Butler"	Rob Schiller	Tom J. Astle	September 24, 1995	2.2
Simon wins a butler in a game of poker.
4	"Simon Gets Carl a Job"	Linda Day	Charleen Easton & Kurt Schindler	October 1, 1995	1.3
The owner of a hot dog cart demands payment when Carl destroys the cart.
5	"Simon's Ship Comes In"	Arlene Sanford	Rick Wiener	October 8, 1995	2.6
Simon wins a boat in a sweepstakes.
6	"Simon Says Surprise!"	Arlene Sanford	Bernie Keating	October 15, 1995	2.1
When Mitch gets depressed, Simon shows him how great life is.
7	"Simon Has Faulty Pants"	Linda Day	Donald Todd	October 29, 1995	2.2
Simon marries an immigrant, when she loses her job because of him.
8	"Simon Plays Carnegie Hall"	Linda Day	Rick Wiener	November 5, 1995	1.3
Simon gets mistaken for a pianist at Carnegie Hall.
9	"Simon Hunts a Rat"	Paul Kreppel	Tom J. Astle	November 12, 1995	3.1
Carl goes to talk to the building's landlord when he is bitten by a rat.
10	"Simon and the She-Devil"	Unknown	Unknown	November 19, 1995	2.0
Simon and Carl has to evict a sexy vixen.
11	"Simon Saves a Restaurant"	Unknown	Rick Ellis	November 26, 1995	1.1
Simon helps a restaurant that is about to go out of business.
12	"You Can Run from Christmas, But You Can't Hide"	Paul Kreppel	Bernie Keating	December 17, 1995	2.8
Simon and Carl is looking for the perfect Christmas gift for Duke.
13	"Simon Kicks Ass"	Paul Kreppel	Charleen Easton & Kurt Schindler	January 7, 1996	2.6
Simon agrees to fight a delivery man who has been starting trouble at the office.
14	"Simon Takes the Helm"	Paul Kreppel	Rick Wiener	January 14, 1996	1.8
Simon takes over the whole cable network.
15	"Simon Sinks the Putts"	Paul Kreppel	Mark Ganzel & Josh Goldstein	February 4, 1996	2.8
Carl and Mitch play a game of golf where the winner wins a month's salary.
16	"Simon Gets the Goal"	Paul Kreppel	Tom J. Astle	February 18, 1996	1.7
Simon and Carl buy a hockey team.
17	"Simon Night Fever"	N/A	N/A	Unaired	N/A
Carl falls for a new employee.
18	"Simon Makes the Split"	N/A	N/A	Unaired	N/A
19	"Simon Looks a Gift Horse in the Mouth"	N/A	N/A	Unaired	N/A
20	"Simon Saves Tinky Town"	N/A	N/A	Unaired	N/A
21	"Simon Goes to the Dogs"	N/A	N/A	Unaired	N/A
