= Becoming Dick =

- Genre: Comedy
- Written by: Rick Gitelson
- Directed by: Bob Saget
- Starring: Harland Williams; Robert Wagner; Elizabeth Berkley; William B. Davis; Woody Jeffreys; Bob Saget
- Music by: Peter Rodgers Melnick
- Country of origin: United States; Canada
- Original language: English

Production
- Executive producers: Lynn Deegan; James Shavick
- Producer: Shawn Williamson
- Production location: Vancouver
- Cinematography: Ron Orieux
- Editor: Ron Yoshida
- Running time: 120 minutes
- Production companies: BD Productions; Exclamation Productions; Shavick Entertainment

Original release
- Release: August 31, 2000

Becoming Dick is a 2000 comedy movie-made-for-television starring Harland Williams and directed by Bob Saget.

== Plot ==
Richard Breggs (Harland Williams) is a struggling actor living in an apartment with his girlfriend. After a conversation with a friend, Richard decides that he is too much of a "nice guy" and that the key to success is to act like a jerk. After his new obnoxious personality lands him a part in a play, Richard thinks he is on his way to being a success. He goes to sleep in his apartment and wakes up in a mansion. It is four years later, but Richard doesn't remember anything that has happened in the elapsed time, due to an accidental bump on the head that gave him amnesia. It turns out that he is now a famous TV star, known for being obnoxious, selfish, and difficult to work with. Richard (now known as Dick) realizes that while his new personality gave him success, it also caused him to lose his girlfriend and best friend. He sets about trying to right the wrongs of the past 4 years.

== Cast ==
- Harland Williams as Richard Breggs
- Robert Wagner as Edward
- Elizabeth Berkley as Maggie
- William B. Davis as Dr. Hardwin
- Michael Moriarty as Mirkin, The Director
- Babs Chula as Waitress (Uncredited as Babz Chula)
- Woody Jeffreys as Josh Weldon
- Ron Small as Lou
- Marnie Alton as Beautiful Woman
- Ingrid Torrance as Lily
- Connie Stevens as Herself
- Lesley Ewen as Belinda
- Peter Kelamis as Porter Smith
- Jim Byrnes as The Bartender
- Edward Asner as Davis Aldrich
- Bob Saget as Bob (uncredited)

== Production ==
The film was shot in Vancouver, British Columbia, Canada.
