= Grand-Daddy Day Care =

2019 American comedy film

- DVD cover
- Directed by: Ron Oliver
- Screenplay by: Robbie Fox; David H. Steinberg
- Story by: Robbie Fox
- Based on: Characters by Geoff Rodkey
- Produced by: Mike Elliott
- Starring: Danny Trejo; Reno Wilson; Margaret Avery; Barry Bostwick; Julia Duffy; Anthony Gonzales; Linda Gray; James Hong; Hal Linden; Alec Mapa; Garrett Morris; Roxana Ortega; George Wendt; Da'Vone McDonald; Jayden Bartels; Clint Howard; Ed Quinn
- Cinematography: Graham Robbins
- Edited by: Heath Ryan
- Music by: Nora Kroll-Rosenbaum
- Production companies: Universal 1440 Entertainment; Revolution Studios
- Distributed by: Universal Pictures Home Entertainment
- Release date: February 5, 2019
- Running time: 96 minutes
- Country: United States
- Language: English

Grand-Daddy Day Care is a 2019 American comedy film distributed by Universal 1440 Entertainment and Revolution Studios. It is the third and final installment in the Daddy Day Care film series. Unlike the first two films, which were released theatrically by Sony Pictures under the Columbia Pictures and TriStar Pictures labels and were rated PG, this is the only film in the series to be a direct-to-video release, to be rated PG-13, and to be distributed by Universal Pictures under its home media division.

== Plot ==
Frank Collins is a best-selling author, who suffers from writer's block. While attempting to write his next novel he and his wife, Emma, struggle to pay their bills and make ends meet. Her hard-headed former convict/retired lawyer father, Eduardo, comes to live with them. Finding it more difficult to entertain his father-in-law and attempt to write his next novel, Frank decides to invite Eduardo's friends into the house to keep him preoccupied. Their home, now filled with senior citizens, falls into disarray. The Collins couple realize that they could make more money by housing and monitoring these elderly individuals. Upon learning of the business being run in the house, a persistent social worker named Ned Tooley becomes determined to shut them down.

Eduardo uses his law expertise to plan a course of action that would allow Frank and Emma to stay in business. Together they purchase the established, but on hiatus, Daddy Day Care from Charles "Charlie" Hinton. Charles recounts his attempts at success with the business, warning them about the unfortunate life-events that may follow. After purchasing the company, they attempt to register and rebrand the establishment as "Granddaddy Day Care". Upon doing so, they learn that there is a waiting period. After being fined by the city, due to the social worker's analysis, the Collins couple struggle to earn enough money to pay their debtors and the fines. Eduardo, who has shown the early stages of dementia, decides to help them sue the city. In court they present their case that they were not issued any warnings. The judge rules in favor of Grand-Daddy Day Care, and the company continues to grow and flourish. Frank, Emma, their son Jordan, and Eduardo begin to grow closer as a family and realize how great their lives have become. Frank meanwhile, gets a new idea for a fiction book based on his experiences running Grand-Daddy Day Care. It becomes a best-seller.

== Cast ==
- Danny Trejo as Eduardo Hernandez
- Reno Wilson as Frank Collins
- Margaret Avery as Millie
- Barry Bostwick as Dan "Dynamite Dan" North
- Julia Duffy as Bonnie
- Anthony Gonzales as Jordan Collins
- Linda Gray as Blanche
- James Hong as Walter
- Hal Linden as Gabe
- Alec Mapa as Ned Tooley
- Garrett Morris as Arnold
- Roxana Ortega as Emma Collins
- George Wendt as Lou "Big Lou"
- Ed Quinn as Jack Quartermaine
- Da'Vone McDonald as Charles "Charlie" Hinton
- Jayden Bartels as Annie
- Clint Howard as Judge Littles
- Mara Marini as Bev
- Nina Millin as Denise
- Eileen Galindo as Velma
- Jackie S. Garcia as Jenny Craig
- Micah Giovanni as Kenny
- Bruno Amato as Sal
- Elizabeth Triplett as Waitress
- Robert Peters as Bailiff
- Bill Cook as Bill, The Clown
- Stacie Greenwell as Mrs. Gulch
- Patricia Elliott as Terrified Woman
- Rodger Halston as Dewayne
