= Ignite Entertainment =

American film production company

- Industry: Motion pictures
- Founded: 1998
- Headquarters: Los Angeles, California, USA
- Key people: Michael Burns, Chairman; Scott Bernstein, VP

Ignite Entertainment is an American film production company. It was developed from the film producing arm of the Hollywood Stock Exchange (HSX), and formally created by Leanna Creel and Michael Burns. In 1999, Creel left the company and Scott Bernstein joined as vice president. Ignite's films include But I'm a Cheerleader (1999), Get Over It (2001) and 2009's Shrink.

== Filmography ==
- 1998: Dancer, Texas Pop. 81 (as HSX Films)
- 1998: Girl (as HSX Films)
- 1998: Possums (as HSX Films)
- 1998: Desert Blue
- 1998: Six-String Samurai (as HSX Films)
- 1999: Night Deposit
- 1999: The Suburbans
- 1999: But I'm a Cheerleader
- 2001: Get Over It
- 2003: Confidence
- 2006: Lost Behind Bars
- 2007: A Valentine Carol
- 2007: Destination: Infestation
- 2007: Devil's Diary
- 2008: Storm Seekers
- 2008: Making Mr. Right
- 2009: Shrink
