= Employee of the Month (2006 film) =

2006 film by Greg Coolidge

- Theatrical release poster
- Directed by: Greg Coolidge
- Screenplay by: Don Calame; Chris Conroy; Greg Coolidge
- Story by: Don Calame; Chris Conroy
- Produced by: Andrew Panay; Peter Abrams; Barry Katz; Robert L. Levy; Joe Simpson; Brian Volk-Weiss
- Starring: Dane Cook; Jessica Simpson; Dax Shepard; Andy Dick; Tim Bagley; Harland Williams; Efren Ramirez
- Cinematography: Anthony B. Richmond
- Edited by: Kimberly Ray; Tom Lewis
- Music by: John Swihart
- Production company: Tapestry Films
- Distributed by: Lionsgate Films
- Release date: October 6, 2006
- Running time: 103 minutes
- Country: United States
- Language: English
- Budget: $10–12 million
- Box office: $38.4 million

Employee of the Month is a 2006 American comedy film directed by Greg Coolidge, who co-wrote it with Don Calame and Chris Conroy, and starring Dane Cook, Jessica Simpson, and Dax Shepard. The film's plot revolves around two warehouse club employees who compete for the affection of their newest co-worker. The film was shot primarily at the Costco store in Albuquerque, New Mexico, (warehouse #116). The film was released by Lionsgate Films on October 6, 2006, and grossed $38.4 million against a $10–12 million budget despite negative reviews from critics.

== Plot ==
For ten years, Zack Bradley has been employed at Super Club as a box boy, but faces uncertainty after a failed business venture. He lives with his grandmother and has friends among his colleagues, including Lon Neilson, Iqbal Raji, and Russell Porpis-Gunders. Zack's rival, Vince Downey, consistently earns Employee of the Month as a fast, popular head cashier. Vince is portrayed as conceited, misogynistic, and a predator in the workplace. He steals credit from fellow associates and mistreats subordinates like his box boy, Jorge Mecico, using deception to ensure management remains unaware of his abuse of power.

When a new cashier, Amy Renfro, is assigned to the store, both Zack and Vince develop romantic interest in her and compete for her attention. Zack discovers through Amy's employee file that she had a relationship with an Employee of the Month at her previous workplace, which motivates him to pursue the same title.

As Zack begins his quest for Employee of the Month, he realizes the challenges that lie ahead. He unexpectedly earns recognition after assisting a customer, who subsequently provides management with a positive review. This success leads to a date with Amy after work, during which Zack arranges a unique experience inside the store while Vince remains unaware of their plans. Amy starts to become interested in Zack, inciting Vince's jealousy. Vince, because of his limerence, does not recognize that his pursuit of Amy is one-sided, as she disapproves of his offensive sexual advances. When a cashier unexpectedly died on the day store owner Glen Ross arrives for an audit, Zack volunteers to fill in, leading to his promotion and access to the cashiers’ lounge, where he enjoys high-end relaxation. At the same time, the breakroom that Zack shared with the lower-level employees is repurposed for merchandise storage.

Vince attempts to undermine Zack's progress, even resorting to breaking into Zack's house to disrupt his alarm system. In response, Zack lists Vince's cherished possession, his 81 Honda Civic, for bargain sale. Jorge, who was promised the vehicle if Vince won the Employee of the Month prize 05 Chevrolet Malibu, ended their friendship with Vince, therefore.

Zack takes Iqbal's shift on the day of a softball game against the rival chain, Maxi-Mart. Although Zack’s participation leads to a corporate favor and helps his team win, it leaves customers in the electronics section unattended, resulting in Iqbal's firing. This situation frustrates Zack's friends, leading them to believe he is becoming increasingly selfish like Vince, viewing his career ambitions as merely a means to pursue a relationship with Amy. Amy overhears their conversation, which leads her to distance herself from Zack, revealing that her previous arrogant boyfriend, a star employee at her last store, was the reason for her transfer.

Zack and Vince end up tied for Employee of the Month. On the day of the tie-breaking competition, Zack resigns, helps Iqbal regain his job, and takes accountability for the situation that led to Iqbal's termination. Iqbal accepts Zack's apology, acknowledging that losing his job turned out to be a blessing in disguise since it allowed him to become a stay-at-home father after his wife received a promotion. Meanwhile, Vince and Jorge reconcile.

When Glen Gary, the store manager, is set to announce Zack's resignation, Zack, along with Lon, Iqbal, and Russell, arrives to inform that he never submitted the resignation documents (Russell had paid off the human resources manager). Zack attempts to mend with Amy, offering a sincere apology and expressing that he has improved as a person because of her. Despite Vince's objections, the fastest checkout competition proceeds.

While Vince secures a win, the award ceremony reveals footage from Semi, the loss prevention associate, showing that Vince cheated by concealing scanned items. It becomes apparent that Zack won, as past surveillance revealed Vince's consistent "skip-scanning" to maintain speed at his register, resulting in significant losses for the store. Vince is subsequently fired and arrested for grand larceny, with fellow associates celebrating his downfall. Zack emerges victorious in the competition and reconnects with Amy.

Six weeks later, Vince finds himself on probation, under house arrest, starting anew at Maxi-Mart with lingering distrust, lacking a car or girlfriend, and facing mistreatment from Jorge.

== Cast ==
- Dane Cook as Zack Bradley, a low-level box boy at Super Club who rises up in the ranks to compete for "Employee of the Month" and who embodies positive clichés of a retail employee
- Jessica Simpson as Amy Renfro, a beautiful cashier who transferred to Zack's store and for whose affection Zack and Vince are competing
- Dax Shepard as Vince Downey, a star employee and head cashier who was Employee of the Month 17 times in a row and dubbed the Fastest Hands in the Southwest, but who embodies the negative stereotypes of a retail employee
- Tim Bagley as Glen Garry, the store manager for Super Club who has low self-esteem and is a closeted homosexual
- Andy Dick as Lon Neilson, manager of the Eye and Glasses department at Super Club and one of Zack's friends
- Brian George as Iqbal Raji, the electronics associate at Super Club and one of Zack's friends
- Harland Williams as Russell Porpis-Gunders, a backroom maintenance employee at Super Club and one of Zack's friends
- Efren Ramirez as Jorge Mecico, Vince's personal box boy
- Sean Whalen as Dirk Dittman, the assistant manager of the Super Club store
- Marcello Thedford as Semi, the heavyset and mentally challenged loss prevention employee at Super Club
- Danny Woodburn as Glen Ross, CEO of Super Club and Glen Gary's older brother
- Barbara Dodd as Granny, Zack's grandmother

== Production ==
In November 2005, Dane Cook was reportedly in talks to star in the Greg Coolidge–directed comedy Employee of the Month for Lions Gate Films and would play one of two clerks who compete for the title of "Employee of the Month" in order to win the affections of the new cashier. Later that month, Jessica Simpson was reportedly in talks to play the new cashier who sparks the rivalry.

The film was made on a $12 million budget.

== Release ==
Employee of the Month opened at #4 just behind Open Season and made $11.4 million opening weekend. In the United Kingdom the film debuted at #4 opening with over £1,000,000 in returns. The film eventually earned $28.4 million in the United States and $38.4 million worldwide. The film became the #1 requested film on AOL.

=== Home media ===
DVD and Blu-ray versions were released on January 16, 2007, and opened at #2 at the sales chart. The DVD version sold 603,711 units for $10.2 million. Eventually, 1,315,439 DVD units were sold, bringing in more than $61 Million in revenue, which does not include DVD rentals.

The 2007 Region-1 DVD release of the film contains two commentaries: one featuring the director (Greg Coolidge) on his own, giving more technical information about the film; the second commentary features the director and star Dane Cook, who spends more time pointing out the origins of gags and characters throughout the film. The disc also contains extra improv scenes by actors Andy Dick and Harland Williams, an alternate opening with Eva Longoria showing Vince and Zack's first day on the job watching a video tape for new employees, and an "At Work with Lon" feature showing Dick in character attempting to help to customers at Super Club, plus trailers for other Lionsgate films.

== Reception ==
On the review aggregator website Rotten Tomatoes, 20% of 92 critics' reviews are positive, with an average rating of 4.10/10. The website's consensus reads: "Employee of the Month features mediocre performances, few laughs, and a lack of satiric bite." Metacritic, which uses a weighted average, assigned the film a score of 36 out of 100, based on 24 critics, indicating "generally unfavorable" reviews. Audiences polled by CinemaScore gave the film an average grade of "B−" on an A+ to F scale.

Most critics viewed Employee of the Month as a familiar, lightly satirical retail comedy that struggled to generate sustained laughter or a distinctive identity. Tim Grierson of Screen International described it as neither funny nor romantic enough to build much interest and argued that it never fully establishes its own personality. In The Washington Post, Ann Hornaday dismissed the film as a laugh-free blend assembled from better workplace comedies, adding that its borrowing went beyond broad premise into specific echoes. Writing for USA Today, Claudia Puig similarly framed the film as more noisy than genuinely funny, treating the comedy as blunt rather than inventive. Mark Olsen at the Los Angeles Times found the film labored and unconvincing in execution, arguing that the premise does not translate into comic momentum.

Reviewers also highlighted a tension between the film's grim view of low-wage work and its reliance on broad gags and plot mechanics. At The A. V. Club, Nathan Rabin argued that the film sketches an oppressive workplace atmosphere yet repeatedly undercuts it with crude set pieces, and he faulted the script for inconsistencies that become more conspicuous as the film goes on. Ken Fox of TV Guide made a related complaint from the opposite angle, suggesting that the setting is ripe for sharper observation but that the film settles for easy jokes rather than satirical bite. Grierson likewise treated the big box environment as underused, writing that the film makes only weak attempts to lampoon workaday drudgery and ends up feeling redundant beside Office Space and The Office.

Commentary on the cast was sharply divided, with several critics criticizing Jessica Simpson and Dane Cook while treating Dax Shepard as a comparative bright spot. Hornaday argued that Simpson contributes little energy to her scenes and that Cook also disappoints, leaving only scattered support-player business to supply brief relief. In a review for the Chicago Tribune, Matt Pais likewise questioned the leads' effectiveness and suggested that the film's PG-13 limits leave Cook without the comic mode that made him popular, pushing the film toward roughhousing and humiliation gags instead. Grierson took a slightly different tack, writing that Cook works hard with thin material but lacks the screen charisma needed to carry a studio comedy. By contrast, Michael Rechtshaffen of The Hollywood Reporter credited Shepard's comic assurance and the interplay among the cast for much of the film's appeal, even while judging the overall result uneven.

A smaller set of notices characterized the film as passable entertainment, emphasizing pacing and character work while keeping expectations modest. Rechtshaffen described the film as affable and argued that its character-driven humor eventually gains enough traction to carry it through. Ruthe Stein of the San Francisco Chronicle called it mildly amusing and pointed to its quickness as a compensating virtue even while noting limitations in the acting and the story's predictability. For IGN, Jim "Stax" Vejvoda similarly treated it as a serviceable comedy and predicted that its long-term life would be stronger on home viewing than at the box office. A later Los Angeles Times article by Susan King summarized its trajectory more bluntly, stating that the film had "fizzled with critics and audiences".

Simpson earned a Razzie Award nomination for Worst Actress, but lost out to Sharon Stone for Basic Instinct 2.
