= Harland Williams =

Canadian-American comedian and actor (born 1962)

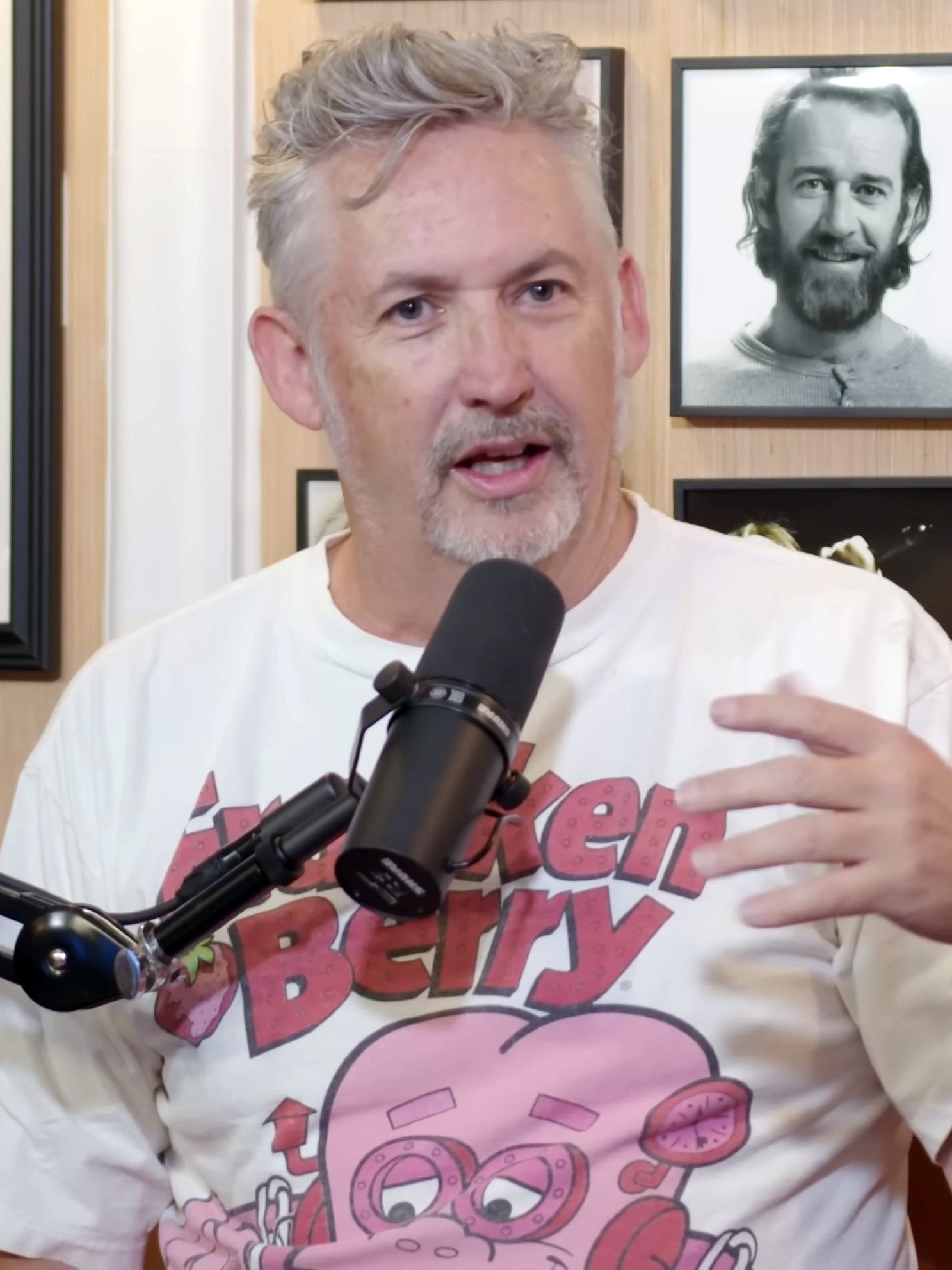
- Williams on the We Might Be Drunk podcast in 2024
- Born: November 14, 1962 (age 63); Toronto, Ontario, Canada
- Occupations: Comedian, actor
- Years active: 1988–present
- Father: John Reesor Williams
- Relatives: Steve Williams (brother); Kevin Hearn (cousin)
- Website: www.harlandwilliams.com

Harland Reesor Williams (born November 14, 1962) is a Canadian and American comedian and actor. After several years of performing stand-up comedy in Toronto and Los Angeles, he made his film debut in Dumb and Dumber (1994) before playing starring roles in the briefly-aired sitcom Simon and the Disney comedy RocketMan (1997). Williams co-starred in Half Baked and played a psychopathic hitch-hiker in There's Something About Mary in 1998. He later appeared in films such as The Whole Nine Yards (2000), Freddy Got Fingered (2001) and Sorority Boys (2002), and provided voices in works such as Gary & Mike, Robots (2005), Meet the Robinsons (2007), and Sausage Party (2016). He is also an author of children's books, and creator of the children's animated series Puppy Dog Pals (2017–2023).

== Early life ==
Harland Reesor Williams was born on November 14, 1962, in Toronto, Ontario, to Lorraine Mary (née O'Donnell), a social worker and writer, and John Reesor Williams, a lawyer who served as a member of the Ontario legislature. He grew up in Toronto's Willowdale neighbourhood with four sisters. He is the brother of special effects artist Steve "Spaz" Williams, and a cousin to Barenaked Ladies keyboardist Kevin Hearn.

Williams enrolled in Sheridan College in 1983, where he studied animation and media arts, while periodically working as a forest ranger at Fort Frances.

Williams gained American citizenship in 2009.

== Career ==
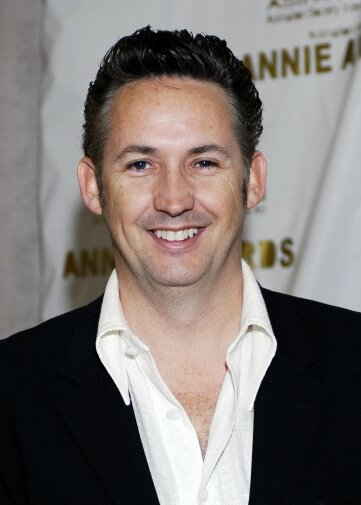
Williams at the 34th Annie Awards in 2007

Williams began in stand-up comedy in 1984, when still at Sheridan College. He performed in Toronto for seven years before relocating to Los Angeles in 1992. He credits a 1993 appearance on Late Night with David Letterman as a breakthrough, and Jim Carrey for bringing him to the attention of the Farrelly brothers, who cast Williams in his debut role as a police officer in Dumb and Dumber (1994).

Other film roles include Freddy Got Fingered, There's Something About Mary, Half Baked, RocketMan, Sorority Boys, Down Periscope, Superstar and Employee of the Month. He has performed his stand-up comedy routines on The Tonight Show with Jay Leno, Late Night with Conan O'Brien, HBO, Comedy Central and at comedy clubs throughout the country.

His improvisational skills led to him winning the award for 'Best Improviser' on an episode of NBC's prime time series Thank God You're Here in 2007.

Williams's ventures include voicing 'Monster' on Nickelodeon's animated series Robot and Monster and starring as Warwick the Warlock in Disney's direct-to-DVD movie Spooky Buddies.

He is the author and illustrator of several children's books, including a series about a dinosaur named Lickety Split, as well as books for adults.

He has a free, weekly podcast called The Harland Highway.

He has appeared on Tom Green's House Tonight and on the Adam Carolla Podcast numerous times. He is known for his performance of bird sounds on Carolla's show.

In August 2012, he began filming in Vancouver a 13-part Citytv comedy series called Package Deal, in which he stars.

Williams created the Disney Junior series Puppy Dog Pals that debuted in 2017.

== Filmography ==
=== Film ===
Year	Title	Role	Notes
1994	Dumb and Dumber	State Trooper	
1996	Down Periscope	E.T. 'Sonar' Lovacelli	
1997	RocketMan	Fred Z. Randall	
1997	Wag the Dog	Pet Wrangler	
1998	Half Baked	Kenny Davis	
1998	There's Something About Mary	Hitchhiker	Uncredited
1998	Dog Park	Callum	
1998	Mr. Headmistress	Tucker	
1999	Superstar	Eric Slater	
2000	The Whole Nine Yards	Special Agent Steve Hanson	
2000	Big Money Hustlas	Officer Harry Cox	
2000	Becoming Dick	Richard Breggs	
2001	Freddy Got Fingered	Darren	
2002	Back by Midnight	Sheriff Hubbard	
2002	Sorority Boys	Doofer / Roberta	
2003	Family Tree	Jake	
2003	Kart Racer	Zee	
2005	Lucky 13	Bleckman	
2005	Because of Winn-Dixie	Policeman	
2005	Robots	Lug (voice)	
2006	Employee of the Month	Russell Porpis-Gunders	
2006	Surf School	Rip	
2007	Meet the Robinsons	Carl (voice)	
2007	The Dukes of Hazzard: The Beginning	Sheriff Rosco P. Coltrane	
2008	Bachelor Party 2: The Last Temptation	Derek	
2008	Madagascar: Escape 2 Africa	Giraffe (voice)	
2009	Fudgy Wudgy Fudge Face	Elmore P. Fudge	
2009	My Life in Ruins	Al 'Big Al' Sawchuck	
2009	The Haunted World of El Superbeasto	Gerard, The Exterminator (voice)	
2010	Dahmer vs. Gacy	God	
2011	Spooky Buddies	Warwick The Warlock	
2011	Lloyd the Conqueror	Vulcan	
2014	Back in the Day	Skunk	
2016	Sausage Party	Ketchup Bottle, Drug Dealer, Baba Ganoush (voices)	
2019	The Addams Family	Norman Pickering, Ggerri (voices)	
2019	The Turkey Bowl	Nolan	
2020	Fearless	Elliot aka Buckethead (voice)	
2021	Back Home Again	Reefer Harfish (voice)	Short film
2023	Once Upon a Studio	Carl (voice)	Short film
2024	Half Baked: Totally High	Talking Joint (voice)	
2024	Isla Monstro	Sam (voice)	
2025	Wingman		

=== Television ===
Year	Title	Role	Notes
1994	Ellen	Ticket Taker	Episode: "The Houseguest"
1995	Big News	Unknown role	Television film
1995–1996	Simon	Simon Hemple	21 episodes
1996	Allen Hansen Cartoon Show	Store Employee, Meltman	Voice; 1 episode
1997	Space Ghost Coast to Coast	Himself	1 episode
1997–1999	Ned's Newt	Newton	Voice; main role; episodes 1–35
1998	The Wonderful World of Disney	Tucker, Headmistress	Episode: "Mr. Headmistress"
2000	Becoming Dick	Richard Breggs	Television film
2000	Sammy	Todd Blake	Voice; 9 episodes
2000–2001	The Geena Davis Show	Alan	22 episodes
2001	Family Guy	Jeff Foxworthy / Sam's Father	Voice; Episode: "To Love and Die in Dixie"
2001	The Santa Claus Brothers	Daryl Claus	Voice; Television film
2001	Gary & Mike	Mike Bonner	Voice; 13 episodes
2004	Las Vegas	Kenny	1 episode
2005	What's New, Scooby-Doo?	George	Voice; Episode: "A Scooby-Doo Valentine"
2005	My Name Is Earl	Johnny Bubblewrapn	Episode: "White Lie Christmas"
2006	Odd Job Jack	Ralph	Voice; Episode: "Dragon Dueler"
2007–2009	Slacker Cats	Buckley	Voice; 12 episodes
2008	The Emperor's New School	Cabbie	Voice; Episode: "Cornivale"
2010–2012	Kick Buttowski: Suburban Daredevil	Pantsy	Voice; 5 episodes
2011	Dan Vs.	Hiram	Episode: "Technology"
2011	Robot Chicken	Professor Cornelius Q. Quibblefingers	Voice; 1 episode; also writes 4 episodes
2011–2015	Jake and the Never Land Pirates	Captain Frost	Voice; 6 episodes
2012–2014	The High Fructose Adventures of Annoying Orange	Apple / Appilles / Vegetable Mob	Voice; 53 episodes
2012–2014	Robot and Monster	Monster	Voice; 26 episodes
2013	Age of Conan: Hyboria Hangover	Carl	1 episode
2013–2014	Package Deal	Sheldon White	26 episodes
2014	Sweet Dreams	Terry	Episode: "Pilot"
2014–2016	TripTank	Various roles	Voice; 6 episodes
2015	Penn Zero: Part-Time Hero	Helper Hue (voice)	Voice; Episode: "It's a Colorful Life"
2015	Webovision: The Tom Green Show	Guest	1 episode
2016	Skylanders Academy	Hugo	Voice; 19 episodes
2016	The 7D	Sandy the Sandman	Voice; 1 episode
2016	Still Single	Demo D	Television film
2017	Be Cool, Scooby-Doo!	Joe McGarth	Voice; Episode: "Vote Velma"
2017	Bunnicula	Thomas Edison's Ghost, Alien	Voice; Episode: "Indistinguishable from Magic"
2017–2023	Puppy Dog Pals	Bob	Voice; Also show creator
2022	Super PupZ	Fisk	Episode: "Pilot"
2022–2023	Oddballs	Patrick, Podcast Host, Guy	Voice; 6 episodes

=== Video games ===
Year	Title	Role	Notes
2005	Robots	Lug	
2007	Meet the Robinsons	Carl	
