= Richard Gant =

American actor (born 1944)

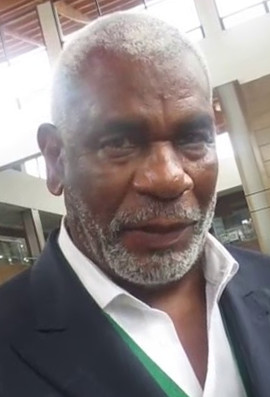
- Gant in 2017
- Born: March 10, 1944 (age 82); San Francisco, California, U.S.
- Occupation: Actor
- Years active: 1980–present

Richard Gant (born March 10, 1944) is an American actor. His credits include the film Rocky V (1990), where he played the Don King-esque George Washington Duke; Hostetler in Deadwood (2004–2006); and Owen in Men of a Certain Age (2009–2012).

He has also appeared in a 1989 episode of Miami Vice, as Battlin’ Barry Gay; as a possessed coroner in Jason Goes to Hell: The Final Friday (1993); and in the films and TV shows Deadwood, The Big Lebowski, Babylon 5, Special Unit 2, L.A. Law, NYPD Blue, Living Single, Posse, Seinfeld, Friends, How I Met Your Mother, Men Don't Tell, and Charmed. He appeared in one episode each of Lois & Clark: The New Adventures of Superman and Smallville.

He has also appeared in Nutty Professor II: The Klumps and Bean: The Ultimate Disaster Movie, as well as reporter Charles Parker in the cult classic adaptation of Colin Bateman’s Divorcing Jack.

He had a minor role as a senior naval officer in Roland Emmerich's Godzilla. Gant was also in Daddy Day Camp as Col. Buck Hinton. Gant joined General Hospital on February 6, 2007 in the role of Dr. Russell Ford. He starred in Men of a Certain Age for its entire two-season run on TNT from 2009 to 2011.

== Filmography ==
Year	Title	Role	Notes
1980	Attica	Eddie Lewis	television movie
1980	Night of the Juggler	Hospital Cop	
1981	Death of a Prophet	Unknown	television movie
1985	Krush Groove	Jay B.	Credit as Richard E. Gant
1987	Suspect	Everett Bennett	
1988	Internal Affairs	Police Commissioner	television movie
1989	Collision Course	Jarryd Guard #2	
1990	Love or Money	"Zoo"	
1990	The Freshman	Lloyd Simpson	
1990	Rocky V	George Washington Duke	
1991	Stone Cold	FBI Agent Cunningham	
1991	False Arrest	Detective John Volland	
1991	Revenge of the Nerds	P.T. Turner	unaired television pilot
1991	Last Breeze of Summer	Will Davis	short
1992	Condition: Critical	Sergeant Lidner	television movie
1993	The Tower	Wilson	television movie
1993	Diagnosis Murder	Detective Jim Michaels	television series
1993	CB4	"Baa-Baa" Ack	
1993	Men Don't Tell	"The Pope"	television movie
1993	Posse	Doubletree	
1993	Jason Goes to Hell: The Final Friday	Phil, The Coroner	
1993	Renegade	Michael Prince	television series
1994	MacShayne: The Final Roll of the Dice	Unknown	
1995	Trial by Fire	Judge	television movie
1996	City Hall	Deputy Commissioner Samuels	
1996	Ed	Umpire, Sharks Game	
1996	The Glimmer Man	Detective Roden	
1996	Raven	Russ Carlson	direct to video release
1997	Bean	Lieutenant Brutus	
1997	Friends	Dr. Rhodes	Season 3, Episode 23
1997	Babylon 5	Captain Edward MacDougan	television series
1998	The Big Lebowski	Older Cop	
1998	Sour Grapes	Detective Crouch	
1998	Godzilla	Admiral Phelps	Credit as Richard E. Gant
1998	The Steve Harvey Show	Clarence Hightower	Season 2, Episode 15
1998	ER	Mr. Lipson	1 episode
1998	Divorcing Jack	Charles Parker	
1998	Johnny B Good	Unknown	Credit as Richard E. Gant
2000	Nutty Professor II: The Klumps	Mr. Gaines	
2001	Kingdom Come	Clyde Kincade	
2001–2002	Special Unit 2	Captain Richard Page	television series
2002	Smallville	Principal Terrance Reynolds	Episode: "Redux"
2003	The Partners	Deputy Chief	television movie
2003 - 2005	Eve	Andrew Hunter	4 episodes
2004–2006	Deadwood	Hostetler	Recurring role
2005	Layla’s Girl	J.B.	
2006	Hood of Horror	Jackson	
2006	Summertime	Paul Reeseman	
2007	Ezra	Mac Mondale	
2007	Norbit	Preacher	
2007	Fist of the Warrior	Chief Matthews	
2007	Young Ceaser	Unknown	
2007	Daddy Day Camp	Colonel Buck Hinton	
2007	Cover	Robert Mass	
2009–2011	Men of a Certain Age	Owen Thoreau Sr.	series regular
2010	Waiting for Forever	Albert	
2010	Ashes	Thomas Muller	
2010	Screwball: The Ted Whitfield Story	Paps "Pure Plastic" Patterson	
2011	Mama & Me	Himself	documentary
2013	Island Song	"Duke"	short
2013–2015	The Game	Walter Mack	four episodes
2014	Bleach	Harvey	
2014	The Fright Night Files	Michael	television movie
2019–2020	Mr. Iglesias	Ray Hayward	Netflix (original series)
2020–2021	The Neighborhood	Walter	three episodes
2021	Doom Patrol	General Tony	Episode: "Subconscious Patrol"
2021	Magnum P.I.	Joseph	Episode: "A New Lease on Death"
2021–22	The Wonder Years	Granddaddy Clisby	Two episodes
2022- 2023	NCIS: Los Angeles	Raymond Hanna	Season 13 and 14
