= Geoff Rodkey =

American screenwriter and author

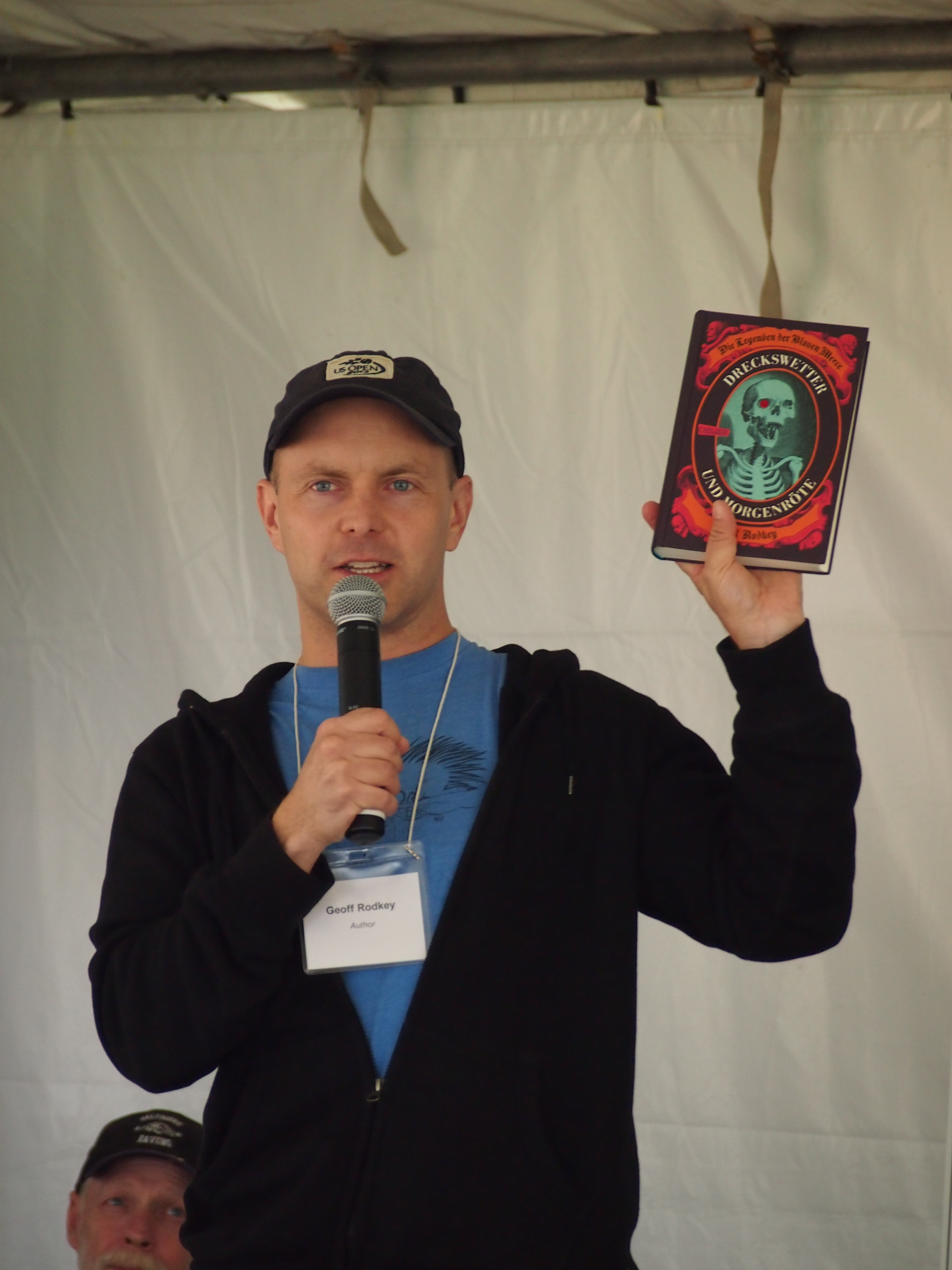
- Rodkey at the 2014 Gaithersburg Book Festival
- Born: Geoffrey William Rodkey; September 9, 1970 (age 55); Freeport, Illinois, US
- Occupation: Writer
- Writing career
- Genres: Children's fiction, screenplays
- Website: geoffrodkey.com

Geoff Rodkey (born September 9, 1970) is an American screenwriter and author.

Rodkey's most recent novel is the suburban-apocalypse comedy Lights Out in Lincolnwood. Previously, he co-wrote comedian Kevin Hart's 2021 debut middle grade novel Marcus Makes a Movie and the 2019 science fiction comedy We're Not From Here. In 2018, he collaborated with the Story Pirates arts education group on The Story Pirates Present: Stuck in the Stone Age, a novel bundled with a creative writing guide for middle graders. Prior to that, his four-book series The Tapper Twins began publication in 2015 with The Tapper Twins Go To War (With Each Other). His first novel was Deadweather and Sunrise, the first book in The Chronicles of Egg comedy/adventure series for middle grade readers.

His film work includes Daddy Day Care, RV, and The Shaggy Dog. He received an Emmy nomination for his contributions to the Politically Incorrect broadcasts from both the 1996 Democratic and Republican national conventions on Comedy Central.

== Works ==
| Year | Title | Notes |
|---|---|---|
| 1994 | Beavis and Butt-head | TV series: Episodes "Cow Tipping" and "Health Club" (co-written with J. Stewart Burns) |
| 1995 | Newtisms | First book |
| 1996 | Rush Limbaugh Is a Big Fat Idiot | assisted with Al Franken's book |
| 1996 | Politically Incorrect | TV series 8 episodes Emmy Nomination |
| 1998 | LateLine | TV series (staff writer) |
| 2003 | Daddy Day Care | |
| 2006 | The Shaggy Dog | screenplay (shared credit) |
| 2006 | RV | |
| 2007 | Daddy Day Camp | characters / screenplay / story (shared credit) |
| 2011 | Good Luck Charlie, It's Christmas! | Disney Channel Original Movie |
| 2012 | Deadweather and Sunrise | The Chronicles of Egg #1 |
| 2013 | New Lands | The Chronicles of Egg #2 |
| 2014 | Blue Sea Burning | The Chronicles of Egg #3 |
| 2015 | The Tapper Twins Go To War (With Each Other) | The Tapper Twins #1 (pub. date April 7, 2015) |
| 2015 | The Tapper Twins Tear Up New York | The Tapper Twins #2 (pub. date Sept. 29, 2015) |
| 2016 | The Tapper Twins Run For President | The Tapper Twins #3 (pub. date Sept. 6, 2016) |
| 2017 | The Tapper Twins Go Viral | The Tapper Twins #4 (pub. date April 4, 2017) |
| 2018 | The Story Pirates Present: Stuck in the Stone Age | collaboration with Story Pirates and Vince Boberski (pub. date March 6, 2018) |
| 2019 | We're Not From Here | pub. date March 5, 2019 |
| 2021 | Marcus Makes a Movie | co-writer with primary author Kevin Hart; pub. date June 1, 2021 |
| 2021 | Lights out in Lincolnwood | pub. date July 6, 2021 |
