= Pace Pictures =

Pace Pictures is a post-production house based in Hollywood, California.

Founded in March 2005 by editor and producer, Heath Ryan, Pace Pictures specializes in film, television, VFX, and title design. Working in collaboration with Raleigh Stewart, Pace was responsible for the acclaimed opening and closing sequences for the feature Veronica Mars and also the iZombie title sequence and bumpers for director Rob Thomas.

Pace Pictures have completed numerous feature films for every major studio in Hollywood, including Beverly Hills Chihuahua 2, The Little Rascals Save the Day, Mine Games, The Lookalike, Jingle All the Way 2, Rob Zombie's 31, Mariah Carey's A Christmas Melody, Alex Zamm's Woody Woodpecker, and Greg McLeans's The Belko Experiment.

Heath Ryan has worked closely with Mariah Carey on her concert films and music clips including, I Don't and her Golden Globe nominated, The Star.

The company directed and post produced numerous concert films with, Juan Santillan and his company Six Degrees TV, including Coachella, Lollapalooza, Coldplay 360, Austin City Limits and many others. Pace produced the pilot, The Producer, starring Billy Zane and the feature film Lawless Range with Kris Kristofferson and Beau Bridges. In 2018, company completed the independent film Silver Lake, written and directed by Sean McGinly. Silver Lake won best original screenplay at the DTLA Film Festival in Oct 2018.

Heath has produced and directed advertising spots, music videos and trailers for international brands and campaigns.

In April 2018, Michael Minkler partners with Pace Pictures.

== Filmography ==
| Films | Year |
|---|---|
| Brothers Lost: Stories of 9/11 | 2006 |
| Dark Heart - Trailer | 2006 |
| Beverly Hills Chihuahua 2 | 2011 |
| Tooth Fairy 2 | 2012 |
| The Producer | 2012 |
| Mine Games | 2012 |
| Go For Sisters | 2013 |
| The Shifting | 2013 |
| Blinder | 2013 |
| Something Real and Good - Trailer | 2013 |
| Stroker (Short) | 2014 |
| The Little Rascals Save the Day | 2014 |
| Beethoven's Treasure Tail - Trailer and End Credits | 2014 |
| A Royal Christmas | 2014 |
| Jingle All the Way 2 | 2014 |
| Veronica Mars - Prologue and End Credits | 2014 |
| The Lookalike | 2014 |
| Missed Call (Short) | 2015 |
| Misled | 2015 |
| Crown for Christmas | 2015 |
| November Rule | 2015 |
| iZombie - Opening Sequence | 2015 |
| Santa's Little Helper | 2015 |
| A Christmas Melody | 2015 |
| Lawless Range | 2016 |
| 31 | 2016 |
| Kindergarten Cop 2 | 2016 |
| Rated (Short) | 2016 |
| Woody Woodpecker | 2017 |
| Hong Kong Phooey | TBD |

Notable commercials
007: Die Another Day - DVD release
8 Mile - DVD Release
The Fast and the Furious - DVD Release
E.T. - DVD Release
Qantas Web Advertisement - Plane
Qantas Web Advertisement - Sale
Myspace: The Documentary
Criminal Minds Season Opener
Wilderness School
