= Story Pirates =

American arts education company for kids

- Abbreviation: SP
- Formation: 2003
- Founders: Lee Overtree; Benjamin Salka
- Purpose: Arts education
- Location(s): New York and Los Angeles, United States
- Services: Improvisational theatre Children's music
- Website: www.storypirates.com www.storypirates.org
- Formerly called: Striking Viking Story Pirates

Story Pirates is an arts education organization based in New York City and Los Angeles. Originally known as the Striking Viking Story Pirates, the group collects written works from students and youth and adapts these stories for the stage. Kid-written work is then performed by professional actors on stage, on video, in schools, and on their popular podcast.

== National attention ==
The Story Pirates received national attention in February 2008 when "The Daily Show" host Jon Stewart called The Story Pirates "crazy entertaining" on Larry King Live; Stewart had seen the group perform at a party he attended with his son. The group is "described as a mix between School House Rock and Monty Python" and has received critical acclaim. The New York Times called their performances a "theatrical treasure," and many others dub it one of the best kids shows around.

== Podcast ==
There are 6 seasons in total of the Story Pirates Podcast. The podcast has featured celebrity guests including Julie Andrews, Billy Eichner, Lin-Manuel Miranda and Bowen Yang The podcast has won a Webby Award, an iHeart Radio Award and a Parents' Choice Award.

== History ==
Originally called the Striking Viking Story Pirates, it was founded in 2003 by ten Northwestern University graduates including actress and comedian Kristen Schaal (Flight of the Conchords). The concept for the Story Pirates grew out of a Northwestern University student organization called "Griffin's Tale." Since then, the organization has grown to include a cast and staff of more than 200 actors, musicians, teachers, puppeteers, songwriters, and technicians.

The co-founders of Story Pirates are Lee Overtree and Benjamin Salka.

Story Pirates shows are made up entirely of original stories written by children, often set to music. Young authors are frequently in the audience to see their work performed. The show runs approximately one hour, contains 10–12 stories, and features outlandish costumes, puppets, and short films made by the group. The Story Pirates also perform private shows, the most popular being birthday parties.

The Story Pirates have released four albums and three books. The album "Cats Sit on You" was selected by the American Library Association as a Notable Recording for Children in 2021, and "The Strawberry Band" was chosen for the list in 2022.

In 2021, Story Pirates Studios produced the "Bugs and Daffy's Thanksgiving Adventure" for Warner Bros Animation. It was released in November 2021.

== Discography ==
Children's albums

- Nothing Is Impossible
- Backstroke Raptor
- Cats Sit on You
- The Strawberry Band

== See also ==
- Young Storytellers
