= Max Burnett =

American film director

- Born: July 24, 1969 (age 56); Dallas, Texas, United States
- Occupations: Director, screenwriter, producer
- Years active: 1991–present
- Spouse: Emily Burnett (m. 2008)

Max Burnett (born July 24, 1969) is an American screenwriter, director, and producer who has been active in film and television since 1991. He directed the football sleeper hit Possums in 1998

In 2008 he created and executive produced the Nickelodeon series The Troop along with Chris Morgan and Greg Coolidge. Filmed in Vancouver, The Troop started airing in the fall of 2009. He won a Writers Guild of America Awards 2009 for his pilot script of The Troop entitled "Welcome to the Jungle" and was nominated for another Writers Guild of America Awards 2011 for his Troop script "Oh, Brother." Burnett is the older brother of composer Justin Burnett. As a producer of Alexa & Katie he was nominated for two Daytime Emmy Awards in 2019 and 2020 and won a Television Academy Honor in 2019.

== Filmography ==
Writer:

- Possums (1998)
- Necessary Evil (pilot) (2009)
- The Troop (2009–2011)
- Oddballs (pilot) (2011)
- The Wilde Life (pilot) (2012)
- Wendell & Vinnie (2013)
- The Other Kingdom (2015)

Director:

- Possums (1998)

Producer:

- The Troop (2009–2011)
- Alexa & Katie (2018–2019)
- iCarly (2021-2023)

Actor:

- Offerings (1989) - Tim

== Awards ==
- Daytime Emmy Awards for Outstanding Young Adult Program for "Alexa & Katie" – nominated (2021)
- Nickelodeon Kids' Choice Awards for Favorite Kids' TV Show - won (2021)
- Daytime Emmy Awards for Outstanding Young Adult Program for "Alexa & Katie" – nominated (2020)
- Television Academy Honor for "Alexa & Katie" – won (2018)
- The Hot List for "Memory of Magic" (2014)
- The Young & Hungry List for "Memory of Magic" and "Home" (2014)
- WGA Award for Children's Programming for "Oh Brother" The Troop – nominated (2012)
- The Hot List for "The Forgotten Man" (2010)
- WGA Award for Children's Programming for "Welcome to the Jungle" The Troop – won (2010)
- Crystal Heart Award – Heartland Film Festival for "Possums" – won (1999)
