= The Troop =

Comedy television series

- The cast of The Troop in the first season (from left to right): Gage Golightly as Hayley, Nicholas Purcell as Jake, John Marshall Jones as Mr. Stockley and David Del Rio as Felix.
- Genre: Comic science fiction
- Created by: Max Burnett; Greg Coolidge; Chris Morgan
- Starring: Nicholas Purcell; Gage Golightly; David Del Rio; John Marshall Jones; Malese Jow; Matt Shively
- Theme music composer: Michael Corcoran (Season 1) Cathy Heller and G. Smiley (Season 2)
- Opening theme: "Troop DeVille" (Season 1) "Superstars" (Season 2)
- Composers: Reg Powell, Sarah Schachner
- Countries of origin: United States; Canada
- Original language: English
- No. of seasons: 2
- No. of episodes: 40 (list of episodes)

Production
- Executive producers: Max Burnett; Greg Coolidge; Jay Kogen; Thomas W. Lynch
- Production location: Vancouver, British Columbia
- Camera setup: Digital, single-camera
- Running time: 24 minutes approximately
- Production companies: The Writers' Room; Tom Lynch Company; No Equal Entertainment; Nickelodeon Productions

Original release
- Network: Nickelodeon (2009–11); Nicktoons (2012–13)
- Release: September 12, 2009 – May 8, 2013

The Troop is an action-comedy children's television series centered around a trio of teenagers who fight monsters that invade the fictional town of Lakewood. Created and executive produced by Max Burnett, Greg Coolidge and Chris Morgan, the series premiered on Nickelodeon on September 12, 2009.

The second season premiered on June 25, 2011, and Nickelodeon cancelled it midway through its airing. The remaining episodes premiered sporadically on Nicktoons throughout 2012 and 2013.

== Premise ==
The show revolves around Jake, a high school student who, after scoring well on an aptitude test, is recruited by his administrator to join "The Troop", a secret worldwide organization which protects the world from monsters and other supernatural phenomena. Additional team members include his fellow students, Hayley, the most popular girl in school, and Felix, the school's main nerd. Teenagers are chosen for The Troop because their young minds are malleable to the strange things of the world, but old enough to understand the responsibilities such a job entails, as it is depicted the older one gets the more frightening monsters become. The show has been described as "Men in Black at a suburban high school".

== Episodes ==
Season	Episodes		Originally released		
Season	Episodes		First released	Last released	Network
1	26		September 12, 2009	August 21, 2010	Nickelodeon
2	14	7	June 25, 2011	August 6, 2011	Nickelodeon
2	14	7	October 29, 2012	May 8, 2013	Nicktoons

== Characters ==
=== Main ===
- Nicholas Purcell as Jake Collins – The newest member of The Troop and the main protagonist of the series, Jake is often naive and reckless. His cohorts usually have to check his behavior due to his instinct for danger that often results in getting himself into trouble. Fellow teammate and longtime crush Hayley perceives him as a goofy slacker who doesn't take his job seriously, while his other teammate Felix's constant attempts to befriend him are usually rebuffed. When not fighting monsters, Jake is shown to be a talented artist and avid comic book fan. The character is named after creator Max Burnett's son. Following the show's cancellation, Purcell retired from acting according to Burnett.
- Gage Golightly as Hayley Steele – A classic overachiever, Hayley is involved with cheer-leading, lacrosse, ballet, the student council and numerous other extracurricular activities. Headstrong and determined to a fault sometimes, at one point she was ordered to take the weekend off from The Troop to relax and when shown her worst fear, encountered a room full of overdue homework assignments. To that end, her teammates perceive her as bossy and confident. She aspires to go to Yale after high school, so much so that her favorite color is Yale Blue.
- David Del Rio as Felix Garcia – A flamboyantly complex nerd generally viewed as an outcast in their school, Felix's closest friends are Jake and Hayley. As the most intelligent member, he is highly resourceful and an expert on mysterious creatures, technology, and weapons-building. In the second season, he leaves the Lakewood Troop upon being promoted to Troop International.
- John Marshall Jones as Leslie Stockley – Lakewood High's awkward Assistant Vice Principal and supervisor of the Lakewood Troop, Mr. Stockley is responsible for briefing The Troop on missions, recent monster activity, and acting as their team leader. Mr. Stockley is named after one of creator Max Burnett's favorite teachers, Stephen Stockley.
- Malese Jow as Cadence Nash – A stereotypical "bad girl" with a voracious appetite, Cadence transfers to Lakewood High after many previous expulsions, and is later revealed to be a monster-human hybrid called a "Bloodthrasher." While both Cadence and The Troop are aware of each other's existences, their relations generally remain neutral until the series finale when Troop International captures her and accuses the Lakewood Troop of harboring a fugitive. After saving the day, in the end she is offered a position within the Lakewood Troop.
- Matt Shively as Kirby Bancroft-Cadworth III – Sent in as Felix's replacement, Kirby transferred to the Lakewood Troop from the Tulsa, Oklahoma Troop. Hailing from a wealthy background, his father invented the "disappearing sock" which affords him many resources. While shown to be smart, in comparison to his predecessor whom he idolizes his inventions often backfire, and even though this sometimes handicaps The Troop, he is shown to be a loyal and honest kid who would do anything for his friends.

=== Recurring ===
- Chad Krowchuk as Augustus – A nerdy teenage boy who serves as the primary human antagonist in the first season, Gus was constantly bullied by his schoolmates, but later learned about the existence of monsters after being sought out by "The Doulos", a large invisible creature incapable of functioning without a human master. When The Troop kills The Doulos, he vows revenge and schemes to take over Lakewood by using monsters as his personal army, resulting in his eventual institutionalization. In the season one finale, he escapes the hospital with the help of a fellow patient and attempts to conquer Lakewood by releasing every monster their Troop has ever captured, but ultimately fails when his "monster magnet" device jams and inadvertently creates a portal to the monster world, which he then voluntarily enters, preferring it over being re-captured. His fate is left unknown, but sounds emanating from the portal as it closed suggest he was mauled by monsters. Had there been a third season, the character would've returned.
- Matreya Fedor as Phoebe Collins – Jake's bratty and sardonic little sister.
- Eduard Witzke as Etienne – A quirky nerd at Lakewood High and member of the A/V Club, he briefly joined The Troop in the second season as a stand-in for Kirby, but had his memory wiped upon the latter's return.
- Dejan Loyola as Cuddy/Omar – Jake's old friend.
- Brenna O'Brien as Angela Crabtree – A rather unpleasant girl who is both frenemy and rival to Hayley.
- Mig Macario as Mr. Spezza – A crabby biology teacher that never ceases to give The Troop a hard time.
- Jessica Parker Kennedy as Laurel/Dryad – Jake's Dryad "girlfriend." She is initially hostile towards The Troop and Student Council over their plans to decimate her forest, but brokers peace with them following Jake's negotiations.
- John Prowse as Dr. Brandenburg – The head of Troop International.

== Production ==
The initial pilot was shot in 2008 before being re-shot with a new cast (minus Purcell). The show premiered to 3.5 million viewers on September 12, 2009 (premiering as a "Special Preview") right after iCarly's "iThink They Kissed". The show officially premiered a week later. A companion website, troopgrid.com, was launched alongside the show, featuring character and creature profiles based on real concept drawings the crew used to model the monsters. In March 2010, the series was picked up for a second season.

On October 15, 2010, it was announced that Malese Jow and Matt Shively would join the second season's cast. In January 2011, David Del Rio announced that he would not be renewing his contract for the second season due to other commitments and would become a recurring cast member after episode 28.

== Broadcast ==
The Troop aired on Nickelodeon and premiered in the United States on September 12, 2009. On August 6, 2011, Nickelodeon put the series on permanent hiatus before officially cancelling the show in 2012. The second season ended with the remaining 7 episodes left unaired. On October 29, 2012, the series was moved to Nicktoons to air the remaining episodes. The final episode aired on May 8, 2013.

== Awards ==
=== Won ===
- 2010 Leo Awards Winner: Music, Comedy or Variety Program or Series: Directing: J.B. Sugar for episode "Wrath of the Wraith"

=== Nominated ===
- 2010 Writers Guild of America Awards 2009 Winner: Episodic Comedy: "Welcome to the Jungle" written by Max Burnett
- 2012 Writers Guild of America Awards 2011 Nominee: Best Episodic Comedy: "Oh, Brother" written by Max Burnett

== Reception ==
Common Sense Media compared the series to Men In Black, saying "the concept isn't exactly original, but the good news is that the likable cast and great special effects make up for any shortage of creativity."
