= Khamani Griffin =

American actor

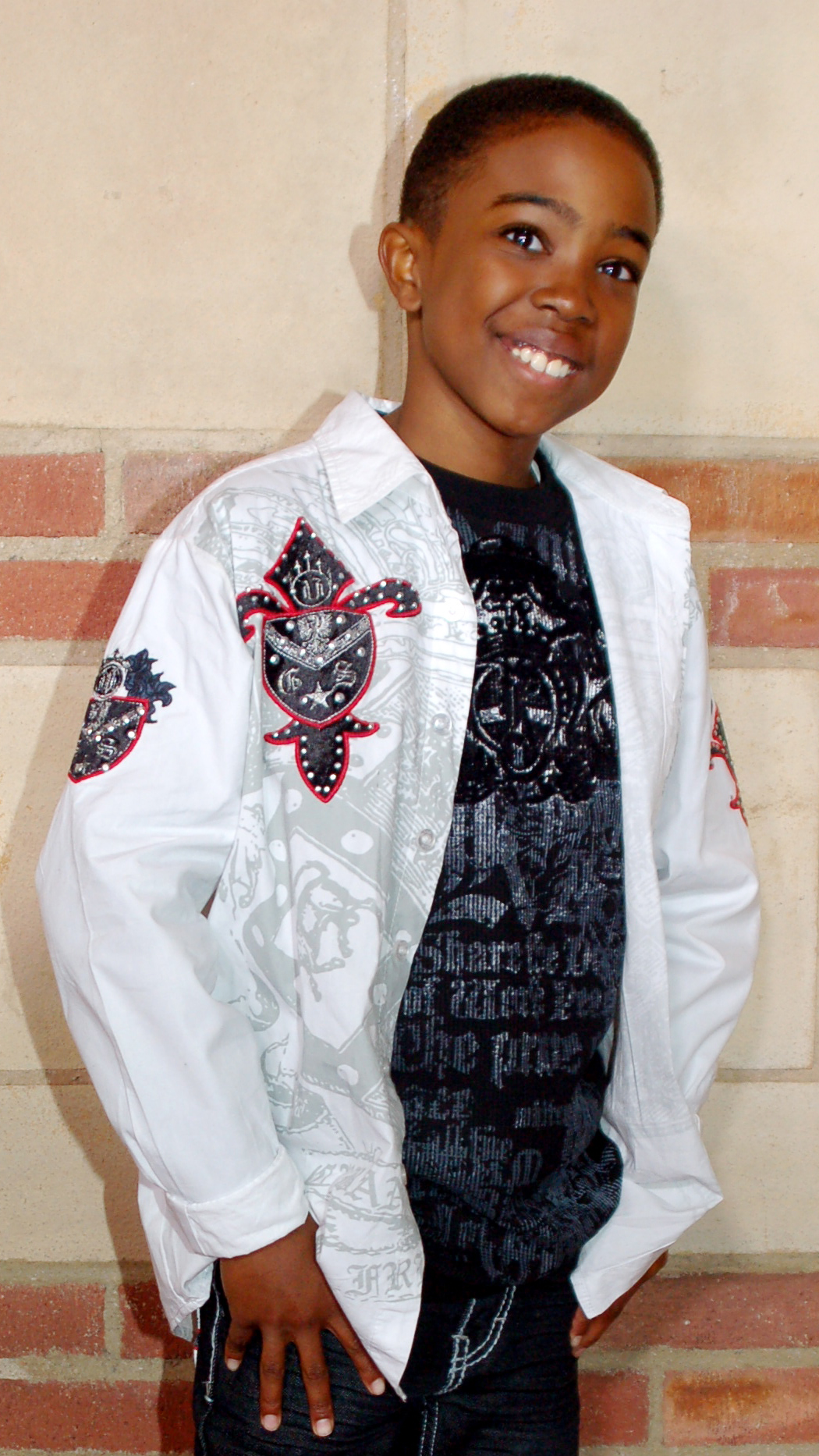
- Griffin in 2010
- Born: August 1, 1998 (age 28); Oakland, California, U.S.
- Occupation: Actor
- Years active: 2002–2017

Khamani Griffin (born August 1, 1998) is an American educator and former actor. He is best known for portraying Bobby James on the UPN/The CW sitcom All of Us as well as Tolee in the animated television series Ni Hao, Kai-Lan. He starred as Ben Hinton in Daddy Day Care (2003) and appeared in Grey's Anatomy, ER, NCIS, and My Name Is Earl. He has been nominated for three Young Artist Awards for Daddy Day Care and All of Us.

He also made an appearance in Lil' Kim's music video for her song "Download". Khamani had a main role on the first syndicated season of the popular game show Are You Smarter Than a 5th Grader? in 2009.

Since 2024, Griffin has been working for Harvard-Westlake School, where he is the Assistant Debate Coach and Assistant Director.

== Filmography ==
=== Film ===
Year	Film	Role	Notes
2003	Daddy Day Care	Benjamin "Ben" Hinton	Debut
2006	Barnyard	Chick	Voice
2006	Happy Feet	Other	Voice
2007	Norbit	Norbit (Age 5)	
2008	Surviving Sid	Beaver Son	Video Short
2009	Hip-Hop Headstrong	Timmy	
2011	The Little Engine That Could	Marcus	Voice
2012	Rise of the Guardians	Caleb	Voice
2012	Sofia the First: Once Upon a Princess	Prince Khalid	Voice
2013	Cloudy with a Chance of Meatballs 2	Cal Devereaux	Voice

=== Television ===
Year	Television	Role	Notes
2003–2007	All of Us	Robert "Bobby" James Jr.	88 episodes
2005	ER	Clayton Davis	Episode: "Alone in a Crowd"
2006	My Name Is Earl	Younger Alby	Episode: "Boogeyman"
2007	Without a Trace	Andrew Prats	Episode: "Skin Deep"
2007–2008	Carpoolers	Aubrey's Kid #3 / Aubrey's Kid #2 / Brady	4 episodes
2007–2011	Ni Hao, Kai-Lan	Tolee / Howard / Ant #2	38 episodes
2008	Entourage	Karate Kid	Episode: "The Day F***ers"
2009	NCIS	Jared Vance	Episode: "Knockout"
2009	Grey's Anatomy	Wallace Anderson	Episode: "Invest in Love"
2009–2011	Are You Smarter Than a 5th Grader?	Himself	TV series Regular
2010	Brothers & Sisters	Alex	Episode: "The Science Fair"
2010	The Life & Times of Tim	Boy Scout	Voice, episode: "The Girl Scout Incident/Rodney Has a Wife?"
2013–2018	Sofia the First	Prince Khalid	Voice, 3 episodes
2013	Modern Family	Davis	2 episodes
2014	Love That Girl!	Cordell	Episode: "Gullible Is as Gullible Does"
2017	The Mick	Clown #2	Episode: "The Haunted House"

=== Other ===
- Trix – Kid #2
