= Da'Vone McDonald =

American actor

- Born: Da'Vone Travell McDonald; February 10, 1985 (age 41); Los Angeles, California, U.S.
- Occupation: Actor
- Years active: 2008–present

Da'Vone Travell McDonald (born February 10, 1985) is an American actor, best known for portraying "Dwayne the Bartender" from the successful 2008 romantic comedy Forgetting Sarah Marshall. He has since appeared in roles in a number of films such as Drillbit Taylor (2008), A Very Harold & Kumar 3D Christmas (2011), The Turkey Bowl (2019) and The Five-Year Engagement (2012) and has also guest-starred in various television series such as House M.D., Raising Hope, and Drunk History. Most of his roles are comedic in nature.

== Filmography ==
=== Film ===
Year	Title	Role	Notes
2002	A Midsummer Night's Rave	Rave Security Guard	
2008	Forgetting Sarah Marshall	Dwayne the Bartender	
2008	Drillbit Taylor	Hip Hop / Country Bodyguard	
2009	Miss March	Guard #1	
2009	Funny People	Hot Dog-Eating Co-Star	
2009	Janky Promoters	Big Bodyguard	
2010	Get Him to the Greek	Sergio's Security Guard	
2010	See You on the Other Side	Tiny / Edwin	Short film
2011	Thief	Wallet Victim	Short film
2011	A Very Harold & Kumar Christmas	Latrell	
2012	The Five-Year Engagement	Taco Customer	
2012	Skyler	Big Steve	
2012	Slightly Single in L.A.	Club Doorman	
2013	Shotgun Wedding	Sully	
2013	Inappropriate Comedy	Vondell	
2014	Dumbbells	Little	
2014	Walk of Shame	Hulk	
2014	The Gambler	Neville's Muscle	
2015	Tooken	Store Manager	
2016	Pet	Nate	
2016	Ringside	Gofer	
2019	Grand-Daddy Day Care	Charlie	
2019	The Turkey Bowl	Ledbetter	
2022	Chip 'n Dale: Rescue Rangers	Jimmy the Polar Bear (voice)	
2022	Dumbbells: Special Edition	Ed	

=== Television ===
Year	Title	Role	Notes
2009	The League	Bouncer	Episode: "The Bounce Test"
2010	House	Daryl	Episode: "Moving the Chains"
2013	Raising Hope	Jack	Episode: "Mother's Day"
2013–2015	The Pet Squad Files	Q Lewis	Main role; 12 episodes
2014–2015	Drunk History	James B. McMillan / Big Bank Hank	2 episodes
2014	Dads	Thomas	Episode: "Jerk in a Box"
