= Greg Coolidge =

American filmmaker and actor

- Born: Redbank, New Jersey, U.S.
- Occupation(s): Film director, screenwriter, actor
- Years active: 1990–present

Gregory Coolidge is an American film writer, director, and television showrunner. He is best known for creating the Ride Along franchise, executive producing and showrunning the limited series The Continental: From the World of John Wick (2023) and executive producing and show running the television series Wayne (2019). In feature films, he also wrote and directed Employee of the Month and the 2019 comedy The Turkey Bowl. He grew up in Norman, Oklahoma and later graduated from the University of Oklahoma.

== Filmography ==
Writer:

- The Continental: From the World of John Wick (2023)
- The Turkey Bowl (2019)
- Wayne (2018)
- Ride Along (2014)
- Dirty Old Men (2012)
- The Troop (2010)
- Coxblocker (2009)
- Born to Rock (2009)
- Employee of the Month (2006)
- Sorority Boys (2002)
- Queen for a Day (2000)

Director:

- The Turkey Bowl (2019)
- For Sale (2011)
- Coxblocker (2011)
- The Troop (2010)
- Employee of the Month (2006)
- Queen for a Day (2000)

Producer:

- The Continental: From the World of John Wick (2023)
- The Turkey Bowl (2019)
- Wayne (2018)
- The Troop (2010)
- Mancrush (2009)
- Possums (1998)

Actor:

- Rocket Power (2002)... Trent
- Sorority Boys (2002)... Pete
- In God We Trust (2000)... Purgatorian
- Queen for a Day (2000)... Rick
- Possums (1998)... Jake Malloy
- Profilers (1997)... Gabriel Vanderhorn
- Hope and Gloria (1996)... Dale
