= Lists of Columbia Pictures films =

Columbia Pictures logo

The following are lists of Columbia Pictures films by decade:

== Lists ==
- List of Columbia Pictures films (1922–1939)
- List of Columbia Pictures films (1940–1949)
- List of Columbia Pictures films (1950–1959)
- List of Columbia Pictures films (1960–1969)
- List of Columbia Pictures films (1970–1979)
- List of Columbia Pictures films (1980–1989)
- List of Columbia Pictures films (1990–1999)
- List of Columbia Pictures films (2000–2009)
- List of Columbia Pictures films (2010–2019)
- List of Columbia Pictures films (2020–2029)

== See also ==
- List of film serials by studio § Columbia Pictures
- Columbia Pictures
- List of TriStar Pictures films
- List of Screen Gems films
- Sony Pictures Classics
- List of Sony Pictures Animation productions
- Category:Lists of films by studio
- List of Sony Pictures Television films
- List of Sony Pictures Releasing International films
