= List of Columbia Pictures films (2020–2029) =

The following is a list of films produced and/or released by Columbia Pictures in 2020–2029. Most films listed here were distributed theatrically in the United States and in other countries by the company's distribution division, Sony Pictures Releasing. It is one of the Big Five film studios. Columbia Pictures is a subsidiary of multinational conglomerate Sony.

All films listed are theatrical releases unless specified. Films with a ‡ signifies a streaming release exclusively through a streaming service.

== Released ==
Release date	Title	Notes
January 17, 2020	Bad Boys for Life	co-production with 2.0 Entertainment, Don Simpson/Jerry Bruckheimer Films and Overbrook Entertainment (Note: Released in select international theaters on January 15, 2020.)
January 23, 2020	The Magic Kids: Three Unlikely Heroes	German film; co-production with Rat Pack Filmproduktion and Westside Filmproduktion
February 14, 2020	Fantasy Island	co-production with Blumhouse Productions
March 2, 2020	Narcissus and Goldmund	German film; co-production with Mythos Film Produktions, Tempest Film and Lotus Film
March 13, 2020	Bloodshot	distribution outside China, Hong Kong and Taiwan only; co-production with Bona Film Group, Cross Creek Pictures, Original Film, Annabell Pictures, The Hideaway Entertainment, One Race Films and Valiant Entertainment; co-distributed in Japan by Aeon Entertainment (Note: Released in international theaters from March 6, 2020.)
October 28, 2020	The Craft: Legacy	co-production with Blumhouse Productions and Red Wagon Entertainment (Note: Originally planned for a worldwide theatrical release, it was released on Premium VOD in the United States on this date in response to the closure of theaters across the globe impacted by the COVID-19 pandemic. To make up for its intended worldwide theatrical release, it was theatrically released in select countries with relaxed COVID-19 restrictions.)
April 30, 2021	The Mitchells vs. the Machines ‡	Chinese distribution only; co-production with Sony Pictures Animation, Lord Miller Productions and One Cool Films; distributed worldwide by Netflix
June 11, 2021	Peter Rabbit 2: The Runaway	co-production with Animal Logic, MRC, 2.0 Entertainment and Olive Bridge Entertainment (Note: Released in Australian theaters on March 26, 2021.)
June 11, 2021	Wish Dragon ‡	Chinese distribution only; produced by Sony Pictures Animation, Beijing Sparkle Roll Media Corporation, Tencent Pictures, Base Media, Flagship Entertainment Group, Boss Collaboration and Cultural Investment Holdings; distributed worldwide by Netflix
June 18, 2021	Fatherhood ‡	Chinese distribution only; co-production with Higher Ground Productions, Bron Creative, Free Association and Temple Hill Entertainment; distributed worldwide by Netflix
July 16, 2021	Escape Room: Tournament of Champions	co-production with 2.0 Entertainment and Original Film (Note: Released in Australian and New Zealand theaters on July 1, 2021.)
August 6, 2021	Vivo ‡	Chinese distribution only; co-production with by Sony Pictures Animation, One Cool Films and Laurence Mark Productions; distributed worldwide by Netflix
September 3, 2021	Cinderella ‡	copyright holder only; co-production with Fulwell 73; distributed by Amazon Studios
October 1, 2021	Venom: Let There Be Carnage	co-production with Marvel Entertainment, Arad Productions, Matt Tolmach Productions and Pascal Pictures (Note: Released in select international theaters on September 30, 2021.)
November 19, 2021	Ghostbusters: Afterlife	co-production with Bron Creative and Ghost Corps (Note: Released in select international theaters on November 18, 2021.)
December 17, 2021	Spider-Man: No Way Home	co-production with Marvel Studios and Pascal Pictures (Note: Released in select international theaters on December 15, 2021.)
December 25, 2021	A Journal for Jordan	co-production with Outlier Society, Mundy Lane Entertainment, Escape Artists, Bron Studios and Creative Wealth Media
January 14, 2022	Hotel Transylvania: Transformania ‡	Chinese distribution only; co-production with Sony Pictures Animation and MRC; distributed worldwide by Amazon Studios
February 18, 2022	Uncharted	co-production with PlayStation Productions, Atlas Entertainment and Arad Productions (Note: Released in international theaters from February 10, 2022.)
April 1, 2022	Morbius	co-production with Marvel Entertainment, Arad Productions and Matt Tolmach Productions (Note: Released in select international theaters on March 30, 2022.)
April 13, 2022	Father Stu	co-production with Municipal Pictures and CJ Entertainment
April 14, 2022	Locked-in Society	German film; co-production with Bantry Bay Productions and ARD Degeto
June 24, 2022	The Man from Toronto ‡	Chinese distribution and copyright holder only; produced by Sony Pictures, Bron Creative and Escape Artists; distributed worldwide by Netflix
July 15, 2022	Where the Crawdads Sing	co-production with Hello Sunshine, 3000 Pictures, HarperCollins
August 5, 2022	Bullet Train	co-production with 87North Productions (Note: Released in select international theaters on August 3, 2022.)
October 7, 2022	Lyle, Lyle, Crocodile	co-production with Eagle Pictures
November 23, 2022	Devotion	North American theatrical co-distribution with Stage 6 Films only; produced by STXfilms and Black Label Media
December 29, 2022	A Man Called Otto	co-production with Stage 6 Films, SF Studios, Artistic Films, Playtone, 2Dux², STXfilms and Big Indie Pictures (Note: Released in Mexican theaters on December 23, 2022.)
March 10, 2023	65	co-production with Bron Creative, Raimi Productions and Beck/Woods (Note: Released in Middle Eastern theaters on March 2, 2023.)
June 2, 2023	Spider-Man: Across the Spider-Verse	co-production with Marvel Entertainment, Sony Pictures Animation, Pascal Pictures, Lord Miller Productions and Arad Productions (Note: Released in select international theaters on May 31, 2023.)
June 23, 2023	No Hard Feelings	co-production with Saks Picture Company, Odenkirk Provissiero Entertainment and Excellent Cadaver (Note: Released in select international theaters on June 21, 2023.)
August 25, 2023	Gran Turismo	co-production with PlayStation Productions and 2.0 Entertainment (Note: Released in international theaters from August 9, 2023.)
September 1, 2023	The Equalizer 3	co-production with Eagle Pictures, Escape Artists and Zhiv Productions (Note: Released in select international theaters on August 30, 2023.)
September 15, 2023	Dumb Money	co-distribution with Stage 6 Films in the U.S., Latin America, Scandinavia, Eastern Europe, South Africa and Asia excluding Japan and Korea only; produced by Black Bear Pictures and The Ryder Picture Company
November 22, 2023	Napoleon	theatrical and VOD distribution only; produced by Apple Studios and Scott Free Productions
December 22, 2023	Anyone but You	co-production with Roth/Kirschenbaum Films, SK Global, Fifty-Fifty Films and Olive Bridge Entertainment
February 14, 2024	Madame Web	co-production with Marvel Entertainment and Di Bonaventura Pictures
March 22, 2024	Ghostbusters: Frozen Empire	co-production with Ghost Corps and Right of Way Films (Note: Released in Belgian and Indonesian theaters on March 20, 2024.)
May 24, 2024	The Garfield Movie	distribution outside China, Hong Kong and Taiwan only; produced by Alcon Entertainment, Prime Focus, DNEG Animation, One Cool Group Limited, Wayfarer Studios, Stage 6 Films, John Cohen Productions and Andrews McMeel Entertainment (Note: Released in international theaters from May 1, 2024.)
June 7, 2024	Bad Boys: Ride or Die	co-production with 2.0 Entertainment, Don Simpson/Jerry Bruckheimer Films and Westbrook Studios (Note: Released in select international theaters on June 5, 2024.)
July 12, 2024	Fly Me to the Moon	theatrical and VOD distribution only; produced by Apple Studios and These Pictures (Note: Released in select international theaters on July 10, 2024.)
August 2, 2024	Harold and the Purple Crayon	co-production with Davis Entertainment (Note: Released in select international theaters on August 1, 2024.)
August 9, 2024	It Ends with Us	co-production with Wayfarer Studios and Saks Picture Company (Note: Released in select international theaters on August 7, 2024.)
August 30, 2024	Afraid	co-production with Blumhouse Productions and Depth of Field (Note: Released in French theaters on August 28, 2024.)
September 27, 2024	Saturday Night	co-production with Reitman/Kenan Productions
October 25, 2024	Venom: The Last Dance	co-production with Marvel Entertainment, Arad Productions, Matt Tolmach Productions and Pascal Pictures (Note: Released in select international theaters on October 23, 2024.)
December 13, 2024	Kraven the Hunter	co-production with Marvel Entertainment, Arad Productions and Matt Tolmach Productions (Note: Released in select international theaters on December 11, 2024.)
February 14, 2025	Paddington in Peru	distribution outside the U.K., Ireland, France, Germany, Austria, the Benelux, Poland, Russia, Australia, New Zealand, China and Japan only; produced by StudioCanal, Marmalade Pictures and Stage 6 Films (Note: Released in international theaters from November 8, 2024 to February 5, 2025.)
May 30, 2025	Karate Kid: Legends	co-production with Sunswept Entertainment (Note: Released in international theaters from May 8, 2025.)
June 20, 2025	28 Years Later	co-production with DNA Films and Decibel Films (Note: Released in select international theaters on June 18, 2025.)
July 18, 2025	I Know What You Did Last Summer	co-production with Original Film and Screen Gems (Note: Released in select international theaters on July 16, 2025.)
August 29, 2025	Caught Stealing	co-production with Eagle Pictures and Protozoa Pictures (Note: Released in select international theaters on August 27, 2025.)
September 19, 2025	A Big Bold Beautiful Journey	co-distribution with Stage 6 Films; co-production with 30West and Imperative Entertainment (Note: Released in select international theaters on September 18, 2025.)
December 25, 2025	Anaconda	co-production with Fully Formed Entertainment (Note: Released in select international theaters on December 24, 2025.)
January 16, 2026	28 Years Later: The Bone Temple	co-production with DNA Films and Decibel Films (Note: Released in select international theaters on January 14, 2026.)
January 23, 2026	Clika	co-production with Sony Music Latin, Sony Music Vision and Rancho Humilde
February 6, 2026	Scarlet	international distribution outside Japan only; co-production with Toho, Nippon Television and Studio Chizu; distributed in North America by Sony Pictures Classics
February 13, 2026	Goat	co-production with Sony Pictures Animation, Unanimous Media, Modern Magic and MACRO (Note: Released in select international theaters on February 11, 2026.)
July 31, 2026	Spider-Man: Brand New Day	co-production with Marvel Studios and Pascal Pictures (Note: Released in select international theaters on July 29 to 30, 2026.)
September 18, 2026	Resident Evil	distribution outside France, Germany, Austria and Switzerland with TriStar Pictures only; produced by Constantin Film, PlayStation Productions, Vertigo Entertainment, Subconscious and Davis Films
October 9, 2026	The Social Reckoning	co-production with Alcon Entertainment, The Gotham Group and Escape Artists
October 23, 2026	Klara and the Sun	co-production with 3000 Pictures, Spyglass Media Group, Heyday Films and Defender Films
November 11, 2026	Ghost Soldier	co-production with Mandalay Pictures

== Upcoming ==
Release date	Title	Notes	Production status
December 25, 2026	Jumanji: Open World	co-production with Matt Tolmach Productions, Seven Bucks Productions and The Detective Agency	Post-production
February 12, 2027	Narnia: The Magician's Nephew	International theatrical distribution outside France, China, Russia and Belarus only; produced by Netflix, Entertainment One, Pascal Pictures, Midnight Road Entertainment and The C.S. Lewis Company	Post-production
April 30, 2027	The Legend of Zelda	co-production with Nintendo, Oddball Entertainment and Arad Productions	Post-production
June 4, 2027	Skeletons	co-production with Infrared, Bad Robot and Assemble Media	Post-production
June 18, 2027	Spider-Man: Beyond the Spider-Verse	co-production with Sony Pictures Animation, Pascal Pictures, Lord Miller Productions and Arad Productions	In production
July 16, 2027	Fake Skating	co-production with Olive Bridge Entertainment	Pre-production
July 30, 2027	The Comebacker	co-production with Playtone, Defiant by Nature and Working Barn	Filming
August 20, 2027	Narcs	co-production with Big Name Entertainment	Pre-production
October 8, 2027	The Haunting of Hotel Transylvania	North American and select international distribution only; co-production with Sony Pictures Animation and Amazon MGM Studios	In production
November 5, 2027	Charlie vs. the Chocolate Factory	international distribution outside China, Belarus and Russia only; produced by Netflix Animation Studios and the Roald Dahl Story Company	In production
November 11, 2027	Treasure Island	co-production with Scott Free Productions	Pre-production
December 10, 2027	24 Jump Street	co-production with Metro-Goldwyn-Mayer, MRC, Original Film, Storyville, 75 Year Plan Productions and Lord Miller Productions	Pre-production
December 22, 2027	Buds	co-production with Sony Pictures Animation	In production
January 14, 2028	Grandgear	co-production with Bad Robot and Zipper Bros Films	Pre-production
April 7, 2028	The Beatles – A Four-Film Cinematic Event (Note: Including Untitled Paul McCartney film, Untitled John Lennon film, Untitled George Harrison film and Untitled Ringo Starr film)	co-production with Neal Street Productions and Apple Corps	Filming
June 9, 2028	Helldivers	co-production with PlayStation Productions and Perfect Storm	Pre-production

=== Undated films ===
Release date	Title	Notes	Production status
TBA	Untitled Fred Astaire biopic	co-production with Pascal Pictures, Lightbulb Pictures, Billy17 and Altitude Films	Pre-production
TBA	Naruto	international distribution only; co-production with Lionsgate, Arad Productions and Hisako	Pre-production
TBA	Hollow	co-production with LuckyChap Entertainment, Honey Trap and Lab Brew	Pre-production

=== In development ===
Title	Notes
28 Years Later III	
Ankle Snatcher	co-production with Escape Artists and Aperture Entertainment
The Ballad of the Ember Knight	
Bloodborne	co-production with PlayStation Productions and Lyrical Animation
Blue Falcon	co-production with Davis Entertainment, Syndicate Entertainment and Eddie Murphy Productions
Blue Streak 2	co-production with Original Film, Run Tel Dat, RDV Films, and IndieProd Company Productions
Castle	co-production with Unknown Quantity
Christine	co-production with Blumhouse Productions
Cola Wars	co-production with Amblin Entertainment and Apatow Productions
Cronkite	
The Day the Crayons Quit	co-production with 21 Laps Entertainment
Days Gone	co-production with Vendetta Productions and PlayStation Productions
Dissolution	co-production with Chronology and Temple Hill Entertainment
Django/Zorro	
Dolly All the Time	co-production with 3000 Pictures and Temple Hill Entertainment
The Earthling	co-production with Chronology and 1201 Films
Eruption	co-production with The Story Factory
The Garfield Movie 2	co-production with Alcon Entertainment, DNEG Animation and John Cohen Productions
Ghost of Tsushima	co-production with PlayStation Productions, 87North Entertainment and Sucker Punch Productions
Ghostbusters: Nightmare on 34th Street	co-production with Ghost Corps
Home Economics	co-production with 3000 Pictures and Marc Platt Productions
Horizon Zero Dawn	co-production with PlayStation Productions and Guerrilla Games
The Husband's Secret	co-production with Depth of Field
Idle Hands	co-production with Team Todd
It Had to Be You	co-production with Platinum Dunes
La Bamba	co-production with Mucho Mas Media
Labubu	co-production with Pop Mart
Life on Other Planets	co-production with Alfresco Pictures
Men in Black 5	co-production with Amblin Entertainment
Metal Gear Solid	co-production with Wonderlab and Konami
Omega	co-production with Mandalay Pictures
One-Punch Man	co-production with Arad Productions
Open House	co-production with 3000 Pictures
Renegades	co-production with Hutch Parker Entertainment and GoldDay
Roboken	co-production with Sony Pictures Animation
The Silent Patient	co-production with Annapurna Pictures and Plan B Entertainment
Simultaneous	co-production with Chronology
Spider-Punk	co-production with Sony Pictures Animation, Pascal Pictures and Arad Productions
Spider-Woman	co-production with Sony Pictures Animation, Pascal Pictures and Arad Productions
Starship Troopers	
The Surrogate Mother	
Tao	co-production with Sony Pictures Animation
An Unfinished Love Story	co-production with Playtone and Eon Productions
Untitled Charlie's Angels reboot	co-production with Flower Films
Untitled Daniel Casey film	co-production with Plan B Entertainment
Untitled Darren Aronofsky/Gillian Flynn film	co-production with Protozoa Pictures and 1.21
Untitled Ghostbusters animated spin-off film	North American and select international distribution only; co-production with Sony Pictures Animation, Netflix and Ghost Corps
Untitled live-action Miles Morales film	co-production with Marvel Studios, Pascal Pictures and Lord Miller Productions
Untitled Sandra Bullock/Dana Fox film	co-production with Fortis Films and Foxy Inc.
Untitled Uncharted sequel	co-production with Atlas Entertainment, Arad Productions, and PlayStation Productions
Untitled Venom animated film	co-production with Sony Pictures Animation and Pascal Pictures
View-Master	co-production with Mattel Studios and Escape Artists
We're Not From Here	co-production with Olive Bridge Entertainment
The Winner	co-production with Pascal Pictures and Billy17
Wolf's Belly	co-production with Esperanto Filmoj

== See also ==
- List of film serials by studio § Columbia Pictures
- List of TriStar Pictures films
- List of Screen Gems films
- List of Sony Pictures Animation productions
- List of Sony Pictures Classics films
- List of Sony theatrical animated feature films
