= List of Columbia Pictures films (2010–2019) =

The following is a list of films produced and/or released by Columbia Pictures in 2010–2019.

== 2010 ==
Release date	Title	Notes
January 14, 2010	Friendship!	German film; co-production with Wiedemann & Berg Film and Mr. Brown Entertainment
March 19, 2010	The Bounty Hunter	co-production with Relativity Media and Original Film
June 11, 2010	The Karate Kid	distribution outside China and Hong Kong only; co-production with Overbrook Entertainment, JW Productions and China Film Group Corporation
June 25, 2010	Grown Ups	co-production with Relativity Media and Happy Madison Productions
July 23, 2010	Salt	co-production with Relativity Media and Di Bonaventura Pictures
August 6, 2010	The Other Guys	co-production with Gary Sanchez Productions and Mosaic Media Group; rights licensed to Nikkatsu for Japan
August 13, 2010	Eat Pray Love	co-production with Plan B Entertainment
September 3, 2010	We Are Family	Indian film; co-production with UTV Motion Pictures and Dharma Productions
September 10, 2010	The Virginity Hit	co-production with Gary Sanchez Productions and Principato Young Management
October 1, 2010	The Social Network	Nominee for the Academy Award for Best Picture; Winner of the Golden Globe Award for Best Motion Picture – Drama co-production with Relativity Media, Scott Rudin Productions, Michael de Luca Productions and Trigger Street Productions; Inducted into the National Film Registry in 2024
December 10, 2010	The Tourist	Nominee for the Golden Globe Award for Best Motion Picture - Musical or Comedy distribution outside the U.K., Ireland, France, Germany, Austria, Switzerland, Italy, the Middle East and Turkey only; produced by GK Films, Spyglass Entertainment and StudioCanal
December 17, 2010	How Do You Know	co-production with Gracie Films

== 2011 ==
Release date	Title	Notes
January 14, 2011	The Green Hornet	co-production with Original Film
January 20, 2011	The Best Movie 3-De	Russian film; co-production with Monumental Pictures and Comedy Club Production
February 11, 2011	Just Go with It	co-production with Happy Madison Productions
March 11, 2011	Battle: Los Angeles	co-production with Relativity Media and Original Film
June 24, 2011	Bad Teacher	co-production with Mosaic Media Group
July 8, 2011	Zookeeper	distribution in all media excluding digital and television only; produced by Metro-Goldwyn-Mayer, Broken Road Productions, Hey Eddie and Happy Madison Productions
July 29, 2011	The Smurfs	distribution outside Japan only; co-production with Sony Pictures Animation and The Kerner Entertainment Company
August 12, 2011	30 Minutes or Less	co-production with Media Rights Capital and Red Hour Productions
September 9, 2011	Bucky Larson: Born to Be a Star	distribution only; produced by Happy Madison Productions
September 23, 2011	Moneyball	Nominee for the Academy Award for Best Picture; Nominee of the Golden Globe Award for Best Motion Picture – Drama co-production with Scott Rudin Productions, Michael de Luca Productions and Rachael Horovitz Productions
October 7, 2011	The Ides of March	Nominee of the Golden Globe Award for Best Motion Picture – Drama; U.S. distribution only; produced by Cross Creek Pictures, Exclusive Media Group, Crystal City Entertainment, Smokehouse Pictures and Appian Way Productions
October 28, 2011	Anonymous	co-production with Relativity Media, Centropolis Entertainment and Studio Babelsberg; rights licensed to Happinet Phantom Studios for Japan
November 11, 2011	Jack and Jill	co-production with Happy Madison Productions and Broken Road Productions
November 23, 2011	Arthur Christmas	co-production with Sony Pictures Animation and Aardman Animations
December 21, 2011	The Adventures of Tintin	international distribution outside the U.K., Ireland, South Africa, Australia, New Zealand and Asia excluding India only; co-production with Paramount Pictures, Nickelodeon Movies, Hemisphere Media Capital, Amblin Entertainment, WingNut Films and The Kennedy/Marshall Company
December 21, 2011	The Girl with the Dragon Tattoo	co-production with Metro-Goldwyn-Mayer, Yellow Bird and Scott Rudin Productions

== 2012 ==
Release date	Title	Notes
February 16, 2012	Yoko	German film; co-production with blue eyes Fiction and Fido Film AB
February 17, 2012	Ghost Rider: Spirit of Vengeance	North American and Spanish distribution only; co-production with Hyde Park Entertainment, Imagenation Abu Dhabi, Marvel Entertainment, Crystal Sky Pictures, Michael De Luca Productions and Arad Productions
March 16, 2012	21 Jump Street	co-production with Metro-Goldwyn-Mayer, Relativity Media, Original Film and Cannell Studios
April 27, 2012	The Pirates! Band of Misfits	The Pirates! In an Adventure with Scientists! outside the US; co-production with Sony Pictures Animation and Aardman Animations
May 25, 2012	Men in Black 3	distribution outside Japan only; co-production with Hemisphere Media Capital, Amblin Entertainment, P+M Imagenation and Wardour Street Pictures
June 15, 2012	That's My Boy	co-production with Relativity Media and Happy Madison Productions
July 3, 2012	The Amazing Spider-Man	co-production with Marvel Entertainment, Laura Ziskin Productions, Arad Productions and Matt Tolmach Productions
August 3, 2012	Total Recall	co-production with Original Film
August 8, 2012	Hope Springs	North American co-distribution with Metro-Goldwyn-Mayer only; produced by Mandate Pictures and Escape Artists
August 24, 2012	Premium Rush	co-production with Pariah
September 28, 2012	Hotel Transylvania	co-production with Sony Pictures Animation
October 12, 2012	Here Comes the Boom	co-production with Hey Eddie, Broken Road Productions and Happy Madison Productions
November 9, 2012	Skyfall (Note: Owned by MGM)	theatrical distribution outside Scandinavia, Portugal, Poland, Hungary, Romania, Bulgaria, the Czech Republic, Slovakia, the Middle East and Israel only; co-production with Metro-Goldwyn-Mayer and Eon Productions
December 12, 2012	Vampire Sisters	German film; co-production with Claussen + Wöbke + Putz Filmproduktion
December 19, 2012	Zero Dark Thirty	Nominee for the Academy Award for Best Picture; Nominee of the Golden Globe Award for Best Motion Picture – Drama; U.S. distribution only; produced by Annapurna Pictures and First Light Productions
December 25, 2012	Django Unchained	Nominee for the Academy Award for Best Picture; Nominee of the Golden Globe Award for Best Motion Picture – Drama international distribution only; co-production with The Weinstein Company and A Band Apart (uncredited)

== 2013 ==
Release date	Title	Notes
May 31, 2013	After Earth	co-production with Overbrook Entertainment and Blinding Edge Pictures
June 12, 2013	This Is the End	co-production with Point Grey Pictures and Mandate Pictures
June 28, 2013	White House Down	co-production with Mythology Entertainment and Centropolis Entertainment
July 12, 2013	Grown Ups 2	co-production with Happy Madison Productions
July 31, 2013	The Smurfs 2	distribution outside Japan only; co-production with Sony Pictures Animation, Hemisphere Media Capital and The Kerner Entertainment Company
September 27, 2013	Cloudy with a Chance of Meatballs 2	co-production with Sony Pictures Animation
October 11, 2013	Captain Phillips	Nominee for the Academy Award for Best Picture; Nominee of the Golden Globe Award for Best Motion Picture – Drama co-production with Scott Rudin Productions, Michael de Luca Productions and Trigger Street Productions
December 13, 2013	American Hustle	Nominee for the Academy Award for Best Picture; Winner of the Golden Globe Award for Best Motion Picture – Musical or Comedy distribution in the U.S., Latin America, South Africa, the Baltics, Eastern Europe and pan-Asian pay television only; produced by Annapurna Pictures and Atlas Entertainment

== 2014 ==
Release date	Title	Notes
January 16, 2014	Not My Day	German film; co-production with Westside Filmproduktion, Donar Film and Mr. Brown Entertainment
February 7, 2014	The Monuments Men	North American distribution only; co-production with Fox 2000 Pictures, Smokehouse Pictures, Studio Babelsberg and Obelisk Productions; international distribution handled by 20th Century Fox
February 12, 2014	RoboCop	theatrical distribution outside the U.K., Ireland, France, Germany, Austria, Switzerland, Scandinavia, Portugal, Poland, Hungary, Romania, Bulgaria, the Czech Republic, Slovakia, the Middle East and Israel only; produced by Metro-Goldwyn-Mayer and Strike Entertainment
February 28, 2014	Stalingrad	Russian film; co-production with Art Pictures Studio and Non-Stop Production
May 2, 2014	The Amazing Spider-Man 2	co-production with Marvel Entertainment, Arad Productions, Matt Tolmach Productions and K/O Paper Products
June 13, 2014	22 Jump Street	co-production with Metro-Goldwyn-Mayer, MRC, Original Film, Cannell Studios, Storyville and 75 Year Plan Productions
July 18, 2014	Sex Tape	co-production with MRC and Escape Artists
September 25, 2014	Who Am I	German film; co-production with Wiedemann & Berg Film and SevenPictures Film
September 26, 2014	The Equalizer (Note: Co-owned by Alcon Entertainment)	distribution outside Australia, New Zealand and Singapore theatrically only; co-production with Village Roadshow Pictures, Escape Artists, ZHIV Productions and Mace Neufeld Productions
October 17, 2014	Fury	distribution outside Italy theatrically, South Africa, Eastern Europe, the Baltics, the Middle East, Israel, Turkey and Asia excluding Korea only; produced by QED International, Le Grisbi Productions and Crave Films
December 19, 2014	Annie	distribution outside Australia, New Zealand and Singapore theatrically only; co-production with Village Roadshow Pictures, Overbrook Entertainment, Marcy Media Films and Olive Bridge Entertainment
December 25, 2014	The Interview	co-production with Point Grey Pictures

== 2015 ==
Release date	Title	Notes
March 6, 2015	Chappie	co-production with MRC and Kinberg Genre
April 17, 2015	Paul Blart: Mall Cop 2	co-production with Happy Madison Productions, Hey Eddie and Broken Road
May 29, 2015	Aloha	North American distribution only; co-production with Regency Enterprises, RatPac Entertainment, Scott Rudin Productions and Vinyl Films; international distribution handled by 20th Century Fox
July 3, 2015	Monk Comes Down the Mountain	Chinese film; distribution outside China only; co-production with New Classics Media
July 24, 2015	Pixels	co-production with China Film Group, Happy Madison Productions, 1492 Pictures and Film Croppers Entertainment
September 11, 2015	Wolf Totem	Chinese-French film; North and Latin American distribution only; produced by China Film Group Corporation and Loull Productions
September 25, 2015	Hotel Transylvania 2	co-production with Sony Pictures Animation and MRC
October 16, 2015	Goosebumps	distribution outside Australia, New Zealand, Japan and Singapore theatrically only; co-production with Sony Pictures Animation, Village Roadshow Pictures, Original Film and Scholastic Entertainment
October 30, 2015	Freaks of Nature	co-production with Matt Tolmach Productions
November 6, 2015	Spectre	theatrical distribution outside Scandinavia, Portugal, Poland, Hungary, Romania, Bulgaria, the Czech Republic, Slovakia, the Middle East and Israel only; co-production with Metro-Goldwyn-Mayer and Eon Productions
November 20, 2015	The Night Before	co-production with Good Universe and Point Grey Pictures
December 17, 2015	Help, I Shrunk My Teacher	German film; co-production with blue eyes Fiction, Karibufilm and Minifilm
December 25, 2015	Concussion	distribution outside Australia, New Zealand and Singapore theatrically only; co-production with Village Roadshow Pictures, Scott Free Productions, The Shuman Company, Cara Films and The Cantillon Company

== 2016 ==
Release date	Title	Notes
January 22, 2016	The 5th Wave	co-production with Material Pictures and GK Films
February 19, 2016	Risen	co-production with LD Entertainment, Affirm Films and Liddell Entertainment
March 11, 2016	The Brothers Grimsby	Grimsby outside the US; distribution outside Australia, New Zealand and Singapore theatrically only; co-production with Village Roadshow Pictures, Four by Two Films, Big Talk Pictures and Working Title Films
March 16, 2016	Miracles from Heaven	co-production with Affirm Films, Roth Films, TDJ Enterprises and Franklin Entertainment
May 20, 2016	The Angry Birds Movie	co-production with Rovio Animation
June 24, 2016	The Shallows	co-production with Weimaraner Republic Pictures and Ombra Films
July 15, 2016	Ghostbusters	co-production with Ghost Corps, Village Roadshow Pictures and The Montecito Picture Company (uncredited)
August 5, 2016	My Best Friend's Wedding	Chinese film
August 12, 2016	Sausage Party	co-production with Annapurna Pictures and Point Grey Pictures
September 23, 2016	The Magnificent Seven	distribution in all media excluding digital and television outside Scandinavia, Portugal, Poland, Hungary, Romania, Bulgaria, the Czech Republic, Slovakia, the Middle East and Israel only; produced by Metro-Goldwyn-Mayer, Village Roadshow Pictures, Pin High Productions, Escape Artists and Fuqua Films
September 29, 2016	The Duelist	Russian film; co-production with Non-Stop Production
October 28, 2016	Inferno	co-production with Imagine Entertainment
December 21, 2016	Passengers	distribution outside Australia, New Zealand and Singapore theatrically only; co-production with Village Roadshow Pictures, Wanda Pictures, Original Film, Company Films and Start Motion Pictures

== 2017 ==
Release date	Title	Notes
January 26, 2017	Attraction	Russian film; co-production with Art Pictures Studio and Cinema Foundation
March 24, 2017	Life	co-production with Skydance
April 7, 2017	Smurfs: The Lost Village	co-production with Wanda Pictures, The Kerner Entertainment Company and Sony Pictures Animation
June 16, 2017	Rough Night	co-production with Matt Tolmach Productions, Paulilu Productions and 3 Arts Entertainment (uncredited)
July 7, 2017	Spider-Man: Homecoming	co-production with Marvel Studios and Pascal Pictures
July 28, 2017	The Emoji Movie	co-production with Sony Pictures Animation
August 4, 2017	The Dark Tower	co-production with MRC, Imagine Entertainment and Weed Road Pictures
September 29, 2017	Flatliners	co-production with Cross Creek Pictures, Laurence Mark Productions, Further Films and The Safran Productions
October 6, 2017	Blade Runner 2049	international distribution only; co-production with Alcon Entertainment, Scott Free Productions, Bud Yorkin Productions, Torridon Films and 16:14 Entertainment; distributed in North America by Warner Bros. Pictures
October 20, 2017	Only the Brave	North and Latin American, Spanish and Indian distribution only; produced by Black Label Media, Di Bonaventura Pictures, Conde Nast Entertainment and Relevant Entertainment
October 21, 2017	The Disastrous Life of Saiki K.	Japanese film; co-production with Plus D Inc.
November 17, 2017	Roman J. Israel, Esq.	co-production with Macro Media, Topic Studios, Cross Creek Pictures, Bron Creative, The Culture China/Image Nation Abu Dhabi Content Fund and Escape Artists
November 17, 2017	The Star	distribution only; produced by Affirm Films, Sony Pictures Animation, Walden Media, Franklin Entertainment and The Jim Henson Company
December 20, 2017	Jumanji: Welcome to the Jungle	co-production with Radar Pictures, Matt Tomalch Productions and Seven Bucks Productions

== 2018 ==
Release date	Title	Notes
February 9, 2018	Pad Man	Indian film; co-production with Mrs. Funnybones Movies, KriArj Entertainment, Cape of Good Films and Hope Productions
February 9, 2018	Peter Rabbit	co-production with Sony Pictures Animation, 2.0 Entertainment, Animal Logic, Olive Bridge Entertainment, Screen Australia and Screen NSW
February 14, 2018	Ice	Russian film; co-production with Art Pictures Studio, Russia-1, Cinema Foundation and STS
May 15, 2018	Little Miss Dolittle	German film; co-production with Dreamtool Entertainment and Velvet Film
May 25, 2018	A Rough Draft	Russian film; co-production with Cinema Fund and New People Film Company
June 13, 2018	Superfly	co-production with Silver Pictures
June 29, 2018	Sicario: Day of the Soldado	North and Latin American, Spanish and South African distribution only; produced by Black Label Media and Thunder Road Pictures
July 13, 2018	Hotel Transylvania 3: Summer Vacation	distribution only; produced by Sony Pictures Animation and MRC (uncredited)
July 20, 2018	The Equalizer 2	co-production with Escape Artists, Zhiv Productions, Mace Neufeld Productions and Picture Farm
August 17, 2018	Alpha	distribution outside China only; co-production with Studio 8 and The Picture Company
September 14, 2018	White Boy Rick	co-production with Studio 8, LBI Entertainment, Le Grisbi Productions and Protozoa Pictures
October 5, 2018	Venom	co-production with Marvel Entertainment, Tencent Pictures, Arad Productions, Matt Tolmach Productions and Pascal Pictures
October 11, 2018	The Perfect Ones	Russian film; co-production with Sinetrain and Mars Media Entertainment
October 12, 2018	Goosebumps 2: Haunted Halloween	co-production with Sony Pictures Animation, Original Film, Scholastic Productions and Silvertongue Films
October 31, 2018	25 km/h	German film; co-production with Sunny SideUp Film Produktion, Pictures in a Frame, Traumfabrik Babelsberg, Babelsberg Film and Mythos Film Produktions
November 6, 2018	The Front Runner	co-distribution with Stage 6 Films only; produced by Bron Studios, Right of Way Films and Creative Wealth Media
November 9, 2018	The Girl in the Spider's Web	co-production with Metro-Goldwyn-Mayer, Regency Enterprises, Scott Rudin Productions, Yellow Bird Entertainment, Pascal Pictures and The Cantillon Company
December 6, 2018	Tabaluga	German film; co-production with Tempest Film
December 14, 2018	Spider-Man: Into the Spider-Verse	Winner of the Academy Award for Best Animated Feature co-production with Sony Pictures Animation, Marvel Entertainment, Arad Productions, Lord Miller Productions and Pascal Pictures
December 25, 2018	Holmes & Watson	co-production with Mimran Schur Pictures, Gary Sanchez Productions and Mosaic Media Group

== 2019 ==
Release date	Title	Notes
January 4, 2019	Escape Room	co-production with Original Film
January 10, 2019	Cold Feet	German film; co-production with Claussen + Putz Filmproduktion and Lotus-Film
January 11, 2019	A Dog's Way Home	distribution outside China, Hong Kong and Taiwan only; co-production with Bona Film Group and Pariah
February 1, 2019	Miss Bala	co-production with Canana Films and Misher Films
February 14, 2019	Loud Connection	Russian film; co-production with Mars Media Entertainment and Strela Film Studio
March 21, 2019	The Goldfish	German film; co-production with Wiedemann & Berg Film and SevenPictures Film
June 14, 2019	Men in Black: International	co-production with Tencent Pictures, Amblin Entertainment, Parkes+MacDonald Productions, Image Nation Abu Dhabi and The Hideaway Entertainment; co-distributed in Korea by Lotte Entertainment
July 2, 2019	Spider-Man: Far From Home	co-production with Marvel Studios and Pascal Pictures
July 26, 2019	Once Upon a Time...in Hollywood	Nominee for the Academy Award for Best Picture; Winner of the Golden Globe Award for Best Motion Picture – Musical or Comedy distribution outside China, Hong Kong and Taiwan only; co-production with Bona Film Group and Heyday Films
August 1, 2019	The Bravest	Chinese film
August 14, 2019	The Angry Birds Movie 2	distribution only; produced by Sony Pictures Animation and Rovio Animation
September 12, 2019	The Space Between the Lines	German film; co-production with Komplizen Film and Erfttal Film
October 18, 2019	Zombieland: Double Tap	co-production with 2.0 Entertainment and Pariah
November 15, 2019	Charlie's Angels	co-production with Perfect World Pictures, 2.0 Entertainment, Brownstone Productions and The Cantillon Company
December 13, 2019	Jumanji: The Next Level	co-production with Radar Pictures, Matt Tolmach Productions, Seven Bucks Productions and The Detective Agency
December 25, 2019	Little Women	Nominee for the Academy Award for Best Picture co-production with Regency Enterprises and Pascal Pictures

== See also ==
- List of film serials by studio § Columbia Pictures
- Columbia Pictures
- List of TriStar Pictures films
- List of Screen Gems films
- Sony Pictures Classics
- Category:Lists of films by studio
