= List of Columbia Pictures films (1990–1999) =

The following is a list of films produced and/or released by Columbia Pictures in 1990–1999. Most films listed here were distributed theatrically in the United States by the company's distribution division, Sony Pictures Releasing (formerly known as Columbia TriStar Film Distributors International) (1991–2005). It is one of the Big Five film studios. Columbia Pictures is a subsidiary of Japanese conglomerate Sony.

== 1990 ==
Release date	Title	Notes
February 9, 1990	Time of the Gypsies	North American and select international distribution only; produced by AAA Classic, Lowndes Productions Limited, P.L.B. Film and Smart Egg Pictures; international theatrical rights licensed to Odyssey/Cinecom International
February 16, 1990	Revenge (Note: International rights owned by Disney (via 20th Century Studios))	North American, U.K., Irish, Australian, New Zealand and Benelux distribution only; co-production with New World Entertainment and Rastar
March 16, 1990	The Forbidden Dance (Note: International rights owned by MGM)	distribution only; produced by 21st Century Film Corporation
March 16, 1990	Lord of the Flies (Note: Full rights owned by Warner Bros.; MGM owns certain non-theatrical rights)	North American theatrical distribution only; produced by Castle Rock Entertainment and Nelson Entertainment
April 13, 1990	The Gods Must Be Crazy II	North American distribution only; co-distributed theatrically by Weintraub Entertainment Group in North America
August 10, 1990	Flatliners	co-production with Stonebridge Entertainment
September 14, 1990	Postcards from the Edge	—
September 20, 1990	The Big Steal	U.S. distribution only
September 28, 1990	Texasville (Note: Owned by MGM)	North American theatrical distribution only; produced by Nelson Entertainment and Cine-Source
October 5, 1990	The 5th Monkey	North American distribution only; produced by 21st Century Film Corporation
October 12, 1990	The Spirit of '76 (Note: Owned by Warner Bros.)	distribution only; produced by Castle Rock Entertainment (uncredited) and Commercial Pictures
October 19, 1990	Night of the Living Dead (Note: Sony has since reclaimed international rights to this film)	North and Latin American, French and Spanish distribution only; produced by 21st Century Film Corporation
October 26, 1990	Sibling Rivalry	North American theatrical and French distribution only; produced by Castle Rock Entertainment and Nelson Entertainment
November 30, 1990	Misery	North American theatrical distribution only; produced by Castle Rock Entertainment and Nelson Entertainment
December 19, 1990	Awakenings	co-production with Lasker/Parkes Productions; Nominee for the Academy Award for Best Picture

== 1991 ==
Release date	Title	Notes
January 18, 1991	Men of Respect	distribution only; produced by Central City Film Company and Arthur Goldblatt Productions
April 19, 1991	Mortal Thoughts	co-production with New Visions Entertainment, Polar Entertainment Corporation and Rufglen Films
May 17, 1991	Stone Cold	North American, U.K., Irish and Japanese distribution only; produced by Stone Group Pictures
June 7, 1991	City Slickers	North American distribution only; produced by Castle Rock Entertainment, Nelson Entertainment and Face Productions
July 12, 1991	Boyz n the Hood	Inducted into the National Film Registry in 2002
August 2, 1991	Return to the Blue Lagoon	co-production with Price Entertainment
August 9, 1991	Double Impact	U.S., English-speaking Canadian, U.K. and Irish distribution only; produced by Stone Group Pictures
September 20, 1991	Late for Dinner	North American distribution only; produced by Castle Rock Entertainment and New Line Cinema
October 11, 1991	The Taking of Beverly Hills	U.S. and French distribution only; produced by Nelson Entertainment
November 27, 1991	My Girl	co-production with Imagine Films Entertainment
December 25, 1991	The Prince of Tides	co-production with Barwood Films and Longfellow Pictures; Nominee for the Academy Award for Best Picture
December 25, 1991	The Inner Circle	distribution outside Italy and Russia only

== 1992 ==
Release date	Title	Notes
January 31, 1992	Hard Promises	U.S. and English-speaking Canadian distribution only; produced by Stone Group Pictures and High Horse Films
February 21, 1992	Falling from Grace	co-production with Little B Pictures
February 21, 1992	Radio Flyer	co-production with Stonebridge Entertainment and Donner/Shuler-Donner Productions
February 28, 1992	Under Suspicion (Note: International rights owned by ITV Studios)	distribution in North America, France, Germany, Austria, Italy, Scandinavia and Japan only; produced by The Rank Organisation, London Weekend Television and Carnival Films
March 6, 1992	Gladiator	co-production with Price Entertainment
April 10, 1992	Sleepwalkers	co-production with Ion Pictures and Victor & Grais Productions
April 24, 1992	Year of the Comet	North American distribution only; produced by Castle Rock Entertainment and New Line Cinema
July 1, 1992	A League of Their Own	co-production with Parkway Productions; Inducted into the National Film Registry in 2012
July 24, 1992	Mo' Money	co-production with Wife 'n' Kids
August 14, 1992	Single White Female	—
August 28, 1992	Honeymoon in Vegas	North American distribution only; produced by Castle Rock Entertainment and New Line Cinema
September 25, 1992	Mr. Saturday Night	North American distribution only; produced by Castle Rock Entertainment, New Line Cinema and Face Productions
October 2, 1992	Hero	co-production with Laura Ziskin Productions
October 9, 1992	A River Runs Through It (Note: International rights owned by Pathé)	North and Latin American and Spanish distribution only; produced by Allied Filmmakers
November 13, 1992	Bram Stoker's Dracula	co-production with American Zoetrope and Osiris Films
December 11, 1992	A Few Good Men	co-production with Castle Rock Entertainment; Nominee for the Academy Award for Best Picture

== 1993 ==
Release date	Title	Notes
January 15, 1993	Nowhere to Run	co-production with Adelson-Baumgarten Productions
January 22, 1993	Hexed	co-production with Price Entertainment and Brillstein-Grey Entertainment
February 12, 1993	Groundhog Day	Inducted into the National Film Registry in 2006
February 26, 1993	El Mariachi	distribution only; produced by Los Hooligans Productions; Inducted into the National Film Registry in 2011
March 5, 1993	Amos & Andrew	North American distribution only; produced by Castle Rock Entertainment and New Line Cinema
April 30, 1993	The Pickle	—
May 14, 1993	Lost in Yonkers	co-production with Rastar
June 18, 1993	Last Action Hero	co-production with Steve Roth/Oak Productions
July 9, 1993	In the Line of Fire	co-production with Castle Rock Entertainment
July 23, 1993	Poetic Justice	co-production with New Deal Productions and Nickel
August 27, 1993	Needful Things	North American and Japanese distribution only; produced by Castle Rock Entertainment and New Line Cinema
September 3, 1993	Calendar Girl	co-production with Parkway Productions
September 17, 1993	The Age of Innocence	co-production with Cappa/De Fina
September 17, 1993	Striking Distance	co-production with Arnon Milchan Productions
October 1, 1993	Malice	North American distribution only; produced by Castle Rock Entertainment and New Line Cinema
November 5, 1993	The Remains of the Day	co-production with Merchant Ivory Productions; Nominee for the Academy Award for Best Picture; Nominee of the Golden Globe Award for Best Motion Picture – Drama
November 12, 1993	My Life	North American distribution only; co-production with Capella Films and Zucker Brothers Productions
November 24, 1993	Josh and S.A.M.	North American distribution only; produced by Castle Rock Entertainment, New Line Cinema and City Light Films
December 10, 1993	Geronimo: An American Legend	—

== 1994 ==
Release date	Title	Notes
February 4, 1994	I'll Do Anything	co-production with Gracie Films
February 11, 1994	My Girl 2	co-production with Imagine Films Entertainment
June 10, 1994	City Slickers II: The Legend of Curly's Gold (Note: Owned by Warner Bros. in North America, and retained by Columbia Pictures internationally)	distribution only; produced by Castle Rock Entertainment and Face Productions
June 17, 1994	Wolf	co-production with Red Wagon Entertainment
June 29, 1994	Little Big League	North and Latin American, German, Austrian and Italian distribution only; produced by Castle Rock Entertainment and Lobell/Bergman Productions
July 22, 1994	North	North American distribution only; produced by Castle Rock Entertainment and New Line Cinema
August 12, 1994	The Next Karate Kid	co-production with Jerry Weintraub Productions
August 19, 1994	Blankman	co-production with Wife 'n' Kids
September 23, 1994	The Shawshank Redemption	North American distribution only; produced by Castle Rock Entertainment; Nominee for the Academy Award for Best Picture; Inducted into the National Film Registry in 2015
October 14, 1994	I Like It Like That	co-production with Think Again Productions
October 28, 1994	The Road to Wellville (Note: Owned by Beacon Pictures, with distribution rights currently licensed to Resurgence Media Group, which has sub-licensed North American rights to Shout! Studios)	North American distribution only; produced by Beacon Communications and Dirty Hands Productions
November 18, 1994	Léon: The Professional (Note: International rights have since reverted to producer Gaumont)	North and South American distribution only; produced by Gaumont
December 16, 1994	Immortal Beloved	distribution in North America, France, Germany, Austria, Switzerland, the Benelux, Scandinavia, Hungary, Romania, Bulgaria, the Czech Republic, Slovakia and former Yugoslavia only; produced by Icon Productions
December 21, 1994	Little Women	co-production with DiNovi Pictures
December 23, 1994	Street Fighter	studio credit on international prints only under the title Street Fighter: The Ultimate Battle; produced by Capcom Entertainment and Edward R. Pressman Productions; distributed in the North America by Universal Pictures

== 1995 ==
Release date	Title	Notes
January 11, 1995	Higher Learning	co-production with New Deal Productions
January 27, 1995	Before Sunrise	distribution in North and Latin America, the Benelux, Australia, New Zealand and Asia excluding Japan only; produced by Castle Rock Entertainment; Inducted into the National Film Registry in 2025
March 19, 1995	For Better or Worse	distribution in North and Latin America, the Benelux and Asia excluding Japan only; produced by Castle Rock Entertainment
March 24, 1995	Dolores Claiborne	distribution in North and Latin America, the Benelux, Italy, Australia, New Zealand and Asia excluding Japan only; produced by Castle Rock Entertainment
April 7, 1995	Bad Boys	co-production with Don Simpson/Jerry Bruckheimer Films
May 19, 1995	Forget Paris	distribution in North and Latin America, the Benelux, Australia, New Zealand and Asia excluding Japan only; produced by Castle Rock Entertainment
July 7, 1995	First Knight	co-production with Zucker Brothers Productions
July 14, 1995	The Indian in the Cupboard	international theatrical and pay television, North American home media and free television distribution only; co-production with Paramount Pictures, The Kennedy/Marshall Company and Scholastic Productions
July 28, 1995	The Net	co-production with Irwin Winkler Films
August 18, 1995	The Baby-Sitters Club	co-production with Beacon Communications and Scholastic Productions
August 25, 1995	Beyond Rangoon	distribution in North and Latin America, the Benelux, Italy and Asia excluding Japan only; produced by Castle Rock Entertainment
August 25, 1995	Desperado	co-production with Los Hooligans Productions
September 22, 1995	The Run of the Country	distribution in North and Latin America, the Benelux, Australia, New Zealand and Asia excluding Japan only; produced by Castle Rock Entertainment
October 6, 1995	To Die For	North and Latin American and Scandinavian distribution only; co-production with Rank Film Distributors and Laura Ziskin Productions
November 17, 1995	The American President	North American distribution only; produced by Castle Rock Entertainment and Universal Pictures
November 22, 1995	Money Train	co-production with Peters Entertainment
December 13, 1995	Sense and Sensibility	co-production with Mirage Enterprises; Nominee for the Academy Award for Best Picture
December 15, 1995	Othello	distribution in North and Latin America, the Benelux, Australia, New Zealand and Asia excluding Japan only; produced by Castle Rock Entertainment
December 22, 1995	Dracula: Dead and Loving It	North and Latin American, Australian and New Zealand co-distribution with Castle Rock Entertainment only; produced by Brooksfilms

== 1996 ==
Release date	Title	Notes
February 2, 1996	The Juror	co-production with Winkler Films
February 16, 1996	City Hall	distribution in North and Latin America, the Benelux, Australia, New Zealand and Asia excluding Japan only; produced by Castle Rock Entertainment
February 21, 1996	Bottle Rocket	co-production with Gracie Films
May 3, 1996	The Craft	co-production with Red Wagon Entertainment
June 14, 1996	The Cable Guy	co-production with Brillstein-Grey Entertainment and Licht/Mueller Film Corporation
June 28, 1996	Striptease	distribution in North and Latin America, the Benelux, Australia, New Zealand and Asia excluding Japan only; produced by Castle Rock Entertainment
July 17, 1996	Multiplicity	co-production with Albert/Ramis Productions
August 14, 1996	Alaska	distribution in North and Latin America, the Benelux, Australia, New Zealand and Asia excluding Japan only; produced by Castle Rock Entertainment
August 23, 1996	The Spitfire Grill	distribution in North and Latin America, the Benelux, Australia, New Zealand and Asia excluding Japan only; co-acquisition with Castle Rock Entertainment
September 13, 1996	Fly Away Home	co-production with Sandollar Productions
September 13, 1996	Maximum Risk	co-production with Roger Birnbaum Productions
September 27, 1996	Extreme Measures	distribution in North and Latin America, the Benelux, Australia, New Zealand and Asia excluding Japan only; produced by Castle Rock Entertainment
October 16, 1996	Get on the Bus	co-production with 15 Black Men and 40 Acres and a Mule Filmworks
December 20, 1996	Ghosts of Mississippi	distribution in North and Latin America, the Benelux, Australia, New Zealand and Asia excluding Japan only; produced by Castle Rock Entertainment
December 25, 1996	Hamlet	distribution in North and Latin America, the Benelux, Australia, New Zealand and Asia excluding Japan only; produced by Castle Rock Entertainment
December 25, 1996	The People Vs. Larry Flynt	distribution outside continental European television only; co-production with Phoenix Pictures and Ixtlan; Nominee of the Golden Globe Award for Best Motion Picture - Drama
December 25, 1996	Some Mother's Son	distribution in North and Latin America, the Benelux, Australia, New Zealand and Asia excluding Japan only; produced by Castle Rock Entertainment

== 1997 ==
Release date	Title	Notes
February 14, 1997	Absolute Power	distribution in North America theatrically, Latin America, the Benelux, Australia, New Zealand and Asia excluding Japan only; produced by Castle Rock Entertainment
February 14, 1997	Fools Rush In	co-production with Draizin Productions
February 26, 1997	Booty Call	co-production with The Turman-Morrissey Company
March 26, 1997	The Devil's Own	co-production with Laurence Gordon Productions
April 4, 1997	Double Team	distribution only; produced by Mandalay Entertainment and One Story Pictures
April 11, 1997	Anaconda	co-production with CL Cinema Line Film Corporation
May 9, 1997	The Fifth Element	distribution outside South Africa, the CIS, the Middle East, Israel, Japan, Korea, Taiwan and Europe excluding Spain only; produced by Gaumont only; produced by Gaumont
June 6, 1997	Buddy	distribution only; produced by Jim Henson Pictures and American Zoetrope
July 2, 1997	Men in Black	co-production with Amblin Entertainment and MacDonald/Parkes Productions
July 25, 1997	Air Force One	North American distribution only; produced by Beacon Pictures and Radiant Productions
August 22, 1997	Masterminds	distribution only; produced by Pacific Motion Pictures
August 29, 1997	Excess Baggage	co-production with First Kiss Productions
October 17, 1997	I Know What You Did Last Summer	distribution outside the U.K., Ireland, Australia, New Zealand, Greece, Cyprus, Germany, Austria, Italy, Spain, South Africa, the CIS, Turkey, Hong Kong, Taiwan, Thailand and the Philippines only; produced by Mandalay Entertainment and Original Film
October 24, 1997	Gattaca	co-production with Jersey Films
October 31, 1997	The Wind in the Willows	U.S. theatrical distribution only; produced by Allied Filmmakers

== 1998 ==
Release date	Title	Notes
January 23, 1998	Spice World	North and South American and Portuguese distribution only; produced by Fragile Films
January 30, 1998	Zero Effect	distribution in North America theatrically, Latin America, Germany, Austria, Australia, New Zealand and Asia excluding Japan only; produced by Castle Rock Entertainment
February 6, 1998	The Replacement Killers	co-production with Brillstein-Grey Entertainment and WCG Entertainment Productions
February 20, 1998	Palmetto	distribution in North America theatrically, Latin America, France, Australia, New Zealand and Asia excluding Japan only; produced by Castle Rock Entertainment and Rialto Film
March 20, 1998	Wild Things	distribution outside the U.K., Ireland, Australia, New Zealand, Greece, Cyprus, Germany, Austria, Italy, Spain and Korea only; produced by Mandalay Entertainment
April 10, 1998	My Giant	distribution in North American theatrically, France, Germany, Austria, Australia, New Zealand and Asia excluding Japan only; produced by Castle Rock Entertainment and Face Productions
April 17, 1998	Sour Grapes	distribution in North America theatrically, Latin America, Germany, Austria, Australia, New Zealand and Asia excluding Japan distribution only; produced by Castle Rock Entertainment
May 1, 1998	Les Misérables	distribution outside the U.K., Ireland, Australia, New Zealand, Greece, Cyprus, Germany, Austria, Italy, Spain and Korea only; produced by Mandalay Entertainment
June 12, 1998	Can't Hardly Wait	co-production with Tall Trees Productions
August 21, 1998	Dance with Me	distribution outside the U.K., Ireland, Germany, Austria, Italy, Spain and Korea only; produced by Mandalay Entertainment
October 30, 1998	Vampires	distribution in North and Latin America, the U.K., Ireland, the Nordics, Spain and the Benelux only; produced by Largo Entertainment and Storm King Productions
November 13, 1998	I Still Know What You Did Last Summer	co-production with Mandalay Entertainment and Original Film
December 11, 1998	Still Crazy	British film; distribution only; produced by The Greenlight Fund
December 25, 1998	Stepmom	co-production with 1492 Pictures

== 1999 ==
Release date	Title	Notes
January 22, 1999	Gloria	distribution outside the U.K., Ireland, Australia, New Zealand, Greece, Cyprus, Germany, Austria, Switzerland, Italy, Spain, Turkey, Japan and Korea only; produced by Mandalay Entertainment
February 26, 1999	8mm	co-production with Hofflund/Polone Productions
March 5, 1999	Cruel Intentions (Note: Owned by AMBI Group and Raven Capital Management, with U.S. distribution rights licensed to Samuel Goldwyn Films)	distribution outside Germany, Austria, Italy and Spain only; produced by Original Film and Newmarket Films
March 12, 1999	The Deep End of the Ocean	distribution outside the U.K., Ireland, Australia, New Zealand, Greece, Cyprus, Germany, Austria, Switzerland, Italy, Spain and Korea only; produced by Mandalay Entertainment and Via Rosa Productions
April 9, 1999	Go	distribution only; produced by Banner Entertainment and Saratoga Entertainment
April 30, 1999	Idle Hands	co-production with Licht/Mueller Film Corporation and Team Todd
May 28, 1999	The Thirteenth Floor	distribution outside Germany and Austria only; produced by Centropolis Entertainment
June 25, 1999	Big Daddy	co-production with Out of the Blue Entertainment
July 14, 1999	Muppets from Space	distribution only; produced by Jim Henson Pictures
August 4, 1999	Dick (Note: Co-owned by Content Partners, LLC)	distribution outside continental European television and Japan only; produced by Phoenix Pictures and Pacific Western
September 17, 1999	Blue Streak	co-production with The IndieProd Company and Original Film
September 24, 1999	Jakob the Liar	co-production with Blue Wolf Productions
October 1, 1999	The Adventures of Elmo in Grouchland	distribution only; produced by Jim Henson Pictures and Children's Television Workshop
October 8, 1999	Random Hearts	co-production with Rastar and Mirage Enterprises
October 22, 1999	Crazy in Alabama	co-production with Green Moon Productions
November 5, 1999	The Bone Collector	international distribution only; co-acquisition with Universal Pictures; produced by Bregman Productions
November 12, 1999	The Messenger: The Story of Joan of Arc	distribution outside France only; produced by Gaumont
December 2, 1999	The End of the Affair	co-production with Woolley/Jordan Productions; Nominee of the Golden Globe Award for Best Motion Picture - Drama
December 17, 1999	Bicentennial Man	international distribution only; co-production with Touchstone Pictures, 1492 Pictures, Laurence Mark Productions and Radiant Productions
December 17, 1999	Stuart Little	co-production with Red Wagon Entertainment, Franklin/Waterman Productions and Global Medien KG
December 21, 1999	Girl, Interrupted	co-production with Red Wagon Entertainment

== See also ==
- List of film serials by studio § Columbia Pictures
- Columbia Pictures
- List of TriStar Pictures films
- List of Screen Gems films
- Sony Pictures Classics
- Category:Lists of films by studio
