= List of Columbia Pictures films (1960–1969) =

The following is a list of feature films produced and distributed by the American studio Columbia Pictures between 1960 and 1969. During the decade Columbia was transformed from a traditional studio into a corporation. An increasing number of international films were released, including a number produced by its British subsidiary.

== 1960 ==
Release date	Title	Notes
January 25, 1960	Swan Lake	Co-production with Tsentralnaya Studiya Dokumentalnikh Filmov
January 26, 1960	The Ugly Duckling	U.S. distributor; produced by Hammer Film Productions
January 27, 1960	Our Man in Havana	Nominee of the Golden Globe Award for Best Motion Picture – Musical or Comedy; co-production with Kingsmead Productions Filmed in CinemaScope
February 11, 1960	Once More, with Feeling!	Co-production with Stanley Donen Films
February 16, 1960	Comanche Station	Co-production with Ranown Pictures; Filmed in CinemaScope
March 3, 1960	Yesterday's Enemy	U.S. distributor; Co-production with Hammer Films; Filmed in MegaScope
April 6, 1960	Killers of Kilimanjaro	Co-production with Warwick Films; Filmed in CinemaScope
April 15, 1960	Who Was That Lady?	Nominee for the Golden Globe Award for Best Motion Picture – Musical or Comedy; co-production with Ansark-Sidney
April 1960	Because They're Young	Co-production with Jerry Bresler Production
May 20, 1960	Man on a String	Co-production with RD-DR Productions
May 1960	The Stranglers of Bombay	U.S. distributor; produced by Hammer Films and Kenneth Hyman
June 7, 1960	Babette Goes to War	U.S. distribution of French Iéna Productions
June 30, 1960	Strangers When We Meet	Co-production with Quine Productions and Bryna Productions
June 1960	The Mountain Road	Co-production with William Goetz Productions
June 1960	12 to the Moon	distribution only; produced by Luna Productions, Inc.
July 1, 1960	Stop, Look and Laugh	Co-production with Harry Romm Productions
July 8, 1960	Battle in Outer Space	US distribution only; produced by Toho
July 11, 1960	Murder Reported	Co-production with Fortress Film Productions Ltd.
July 1960	13 Ghosts	Co-production with William Castle Productions; Remake of 2001 film
August 11, 1960	Song Without End	Winner of the Golden Globe Award for Best Motion Picture – Musical or Comedy; co-production with William Goetz Productions Filmed in CinemaScope
August 26, 1960	All the Young Men	Co-production with Jaguar Production and Ladd Enterprises
August 1960	My Dog, Buddy	Co-production with McLendon Radio Pictures
September 29, 1960	Surprise Package	Co-production with Stanley Donen Enterprises
September 1960	As the Sea Rages	co-production with Zagreb Film
September 1960	Anna of Brooklyn	U.K. and U.S. distribution only; produced by Cinédis, Cinematogrifica Latina, France Cinéma Productions, Les Films Marceau and Produzione Circeo
October 5, 1960	The Nights of Lucretia Borgia	U.S. distribution only; produced by Unidis, Fidès and Musa
October 19, 1960	I Aim at the Stars	Co-production with Morningside Productions and Fama-Film
October 19, 1960	The Enemy General	co-production with Clover Productions
October 1960	Let No Man Write My Epitaph	Co-production with Boris D. Kaplan Productions, Inc.
November 1960	Jazz Boat	Co-Production with Warwick Films; Filmed in CinemaScope
December 16, 1960	The 3 Worlds of Gulliver	Co-production with Morningside Productions
December 21, 1960	Pepe	Mexican film; Co-production with Posa Films; Nominee of the Golden Globe Award for Best Motion Picture – Musical or Comedy
December 29, 1960	The Wackiest Ship in the Army	Co-production with Fred Kohlmar Productions; Filmed in CinemaScope

== 1961 ==
Release date	Title	Notes
1961	Santo vs. the Evil Brain	Mexican film
1961	Santo vs. Internal Men	Mexican film
January 1961	Cry for Happy	Co-production with William Goetz Productions; Filmed in CinemaScope
January 25, 1961	Carthage in Flames	
January 25, 1961	Sword of Sherwood Forest	US distributor; produced by Hammer Films
February 1961	Five Golden Hours	
March 1961	Underworld U.S.A.	co-production with Globe Enterprises
March 15, 1961	The Terror of the Tongs	
March 22, 1961	Passport to China	
April 21, 1961	Mein Kampf	Co production with Minerva Film AB
May 12, 1961	Mad Dog Coll	
May 17, 1961	The Warrior Empress	
May 29, 1961	A Raisin in the Sun	Remade in 2008 Inducted into the National Film Registry in 2005
June 2, 1961	Gidget Goes Hawaiian	Co-production with Jerry Bresler Productions
June 21, 1961	The Full Treatment	
June 22, 1961	The Guns of Navarone	Nominee for the Academy Award for Best Picture; Winner of the Golden Globe Award for Best Motion Picture – Drama Filmed in CinemaScope
June 26, 1961	The Truth	French & Italian film co-production with Han Productions and C.E.I.A.P.
June 28, 1961	Two Rode Together	co-production with John Ford Productions & Shpetner Productions
June 28, 1961	Homicidal	co-production with William Castle Productions
July 4, 1961	Most Dangerous Man Alive	distribution only; produced by Benedict Bogeaus Productions and Trans Global Films
July 26, 1961	The Queen of the Pirates	
August 22, 1961	Taste of Fear	
September 7, 1961	The Illiterate One	Mexican film; co-production with Posa Films
October 8, 1961	Mr. Sardonicus	
October 18, 1961	The Devil at 4 O'Clock	
November 1, 1961	A Weekend with Lulu	co-production with Hammer Film Productions
November 21, 1961	The Greengage Summer	
November 1961	Valley of the Dragons	
December 20, 1961	Cash on Demand	U.S. distribution only; produced by British Lion Films, Hammer Films and Woodpecker Films
December 20, 1961	Everything's Ducky	
December 20, 1961	Mysterious Island	
December 30, 1961	Twist Around the Clock	

== 1962 ==
Release date	Title	Notes
February 2, 1962	Sail a Crooked Ship	
February 15, 1962	The Three Stooges Meet Hercules	Co-production with Normandy Productions
February 21, 1962	Walk on the Wild Side	
March 14, 1962	The Hellions	
April 13, 1962	Experiment in Terror	
April 13, 1962	Safe at Home!	
April 13, 1962	Don't Knock the Twist	
April 19, 1962	Five Finger Exercise	
May 10, 1962	Mothra	U.S. distribution only; produced in Japan by Toho
June 1962	The Wild Westerners	Co-production with Four Leaf Productions
June 6, 1962	Advise & Consent (Note: Owned by Otto Preminger Films, Ltd., with distribution rights currently licensed to Warner Bros.)	Distribution only; produced by Alpha-Alpina S.A.
June 6, 1962	13 West Street	Co-production with Ladd Enterprises
July 4, 1962	The Three Stooges in Orbit	Co-production with Normandy Productions
July 26, 1962	The Notorious Landlady	
August 6, 1962	The Best of Enemies	Nominee of the Golden Globe Award for Best Motion Picture – Musical or Comedy; co-production with Dino de Laurentiis Cinematografica
August 8, 1962	The Underwater City	
August 8, 1962	The Interns	Co-production with Robert Cohn Productions
August 1962	The Pirates of Blood River	Co-production with Hammer Films and British Lion Films
September 19, 1962	Damn the Defiant!	Co-production with G.W. Films Limited
September 1962	It's Trad, Dad!	
October 3, 1962	Zotz!	
October 4, 1962	The Extra	Mexican film; co-production with Posa Films
October 10, 1962	Barabbas	
October 16, 1962	Requiem for a Heavyweight	
October 24, 1962	We'll Bury You!	Documentary
October 25, 1962	The War Lover	
October 31, 1962	The Trunk	
November 23, 1962	Sundays and Cybele	
November 28, 1962	Two Tickets to Paris	
December 16, 1962	Lawrence of Arabia	Winner of the Academy Award for Best Picture; Winner of the Golden Globe Award for Best Motion Picture – Drama; Co-production with Horizon Pictures Inducted into the National Film Registry in 1991

== 1963 ==
Release date	Title	Notes
February 13, 1963	Diamond Head	Co-production with Jerry Bresler Productions
April 4, 1963	Bye Bye Birdie	Nominee of the Golden Globe Award for Best Motion Picture – Musical or Comedy; co-production with Kohlmar-Sidney Productions
April 17, 1963	The Man from the Diner's Club	Co-production with Dena Productions and Ampersand
June 1963	Just for Fun	co-production with Amicus Productions
June 19, 1963	Jason and the Argonauts	Co-production with The Great Company and Morningside Productions
August 7, 1963	Gidget Goes to Rome	Co-production with Jerry Bresler Productions
August 21, 1963	The Three Stooges Go Around the World in a Daze	Co-production with Normandy Productions
August 1963	Siege of the Saxons	Co-production with Ameran Films
September 9, 1963	Reach for Glory	British film: Co-production with Blazer Films
September 11, 1963	13 Frightened Girls	
September 18, 1963	In the French Style	
October 1963	The Running Man	
October 23, 1963	Under the Yum Yum Tree	Nominee of the Golden Globe Award for Best Motion Picture – Musical or Comedy; co-production with Sonnis
October 30, 1963	Maniac	Co-production with Hammer Films
October 31, 1963	The Old Dark House	Co-production with William Castle Productions and Hammer Films
December 12, 1963	The Cardinal	Winner of the Golden Globe Award for Best Motion Picture – Drama
December 19, 1963	The Victors	Co-production with Highroad Productions and Open Road Films
December 25, 1963	Immediate Delivery	Mexican film; co-production with Posa Films

== 1964 ==
Release date	Title	Notes
January 1, 1964	The Little Prince and the Eight-Headed Dragon	U.S. distribution only; produced by Toei Doga
January 19, 1964	Strait-Jacket	Co-production with William Castle Productions
January 29, 1964	Dr. Strangelove	Nominee for the Academy Award for Best Picture; co-production with Hawk Films U.K. Inducted into the National Film Registry in 1989
March 1964	The Crimson Blade	distribution only; produced by Associated British Picture Corporation and Hammer Films
April 1, 1964	The Quick Gun	Co-production with Admiral Pictures and Robert E. Kent Productions
June 1, 1964	The New Interns	Co-production with Robert Cohn Productions
June 3, 1964	Hey There, It's Yogi Bear!	theatrical distribution only, produced by Hanna-Barbera Productions (Note: Owned by Warner Bros.)
June 24, 1964	The Long Ships	Co-production with Warwick Films and Avala Film
July 22, 1964	Good Neighbor Sam	Co-production with David Swift Productions
August 5, 1964	Ride the Wild Surf	Co-production with Jana Productions
August 14, 1964	Behold a Pale Horse	
September 3, 1964	The Little Priest	Mexican film; co-production with Posa Films
October 1, 1964	Lilith	co-production with Centaur Productions
October 7, 1964	Fail Safe	
November 9, 1964	The Pumpkin Eater	U.S. distribution only; produced by Royal Films International
November 10, 1964	The Finest Hours	
November 20, 1964	First Men in the Moon	
December 22, 1964	World Without Sun	
December 31, 1964	The Curse of the Mummy's Tomb	

== 1965 ==
Release date	Title	Notes
January 1, 1965	The Outlaws Is Coming	
January 13, 1965	Baby the Rain Must Fall	Co-production with Park Place Production and Solar Productions
February 17, 1965	The Gorgon	British film
February 24, 1965	Love Has Many Faces	
February 25, 1965	Lord Jim	
March 16, 1965	Major Dundee	
May 1, 1965	Apache Gold	West German film
May 5, 1965	Synanon	
May 19, 1965	Fanatic	British film
June 17, 1965	The Collector	British film, Nominee of the Golden Globe Award for Best Motion Picture – Drama
June 23, 1965	Genghis Khan	
June 24, 1965	Cat Ballou	Nominee of the Golden Globe Award for Best Motion Picture – Musical or Comedy
June 28, 1965	The Dolls	U.S. distribution only; co-production with Documento Film & Orsay Films; produced by Royal Films International
July 7, 1965	The Damned	
July 12, 1965	Harvey Middleman, Fireman	
July 29, 1965	Ship of Fools	Co-production with Stanley Kramer Productions; Nominee for the Academy Award for Best Picture; Nominee of the Golden Globe Award for Best Motion Picture – Drama
July 1965	East of Sudan	British film
August 1, 1965	Arizona Raiders	co-production with Admiral Pictures and Robert E. Kent Productions
September 1, 1965	The Great Sioux Massacre	
September 15, 1965	The Little Ones	
September 16, 1965	That Man in Istanbul	German/Italian/Spanish film
September 27, 1965	Mickey One	
October 3, 1965	Bunny Lake Is Missing	
October 7, 1965	Mr. Doctor	Co-production with Posa Films
October 11, 1965	The Bedford Incident	
October 27, 1965	King Rat	
October 28, 1965	Winter A-Go-Go	
October 1965	You Must Be Joking!	
October 1965	Hard Time for Princes	
November 1, 1965	Treasure of Silver Lake	West German film
November 26, 1965	The Magic World of Topo Gigio	U.S. distribution only; produced by Cinecidi, Jolly Film and Sullivan Enterprises
November 1965	The Brigand of Kandahar	distribution only; produced by Associated British Picture Corporation and Hammer Films

== 1966 ==
Release date	Title	Notes
January 1966	Rampage at Apache Wells	U.S. distribution only; produced by Rialto Film and Jadran Film
January 1966	Ride Beyond Vengeance	Co-production with Mark Goodson-Bill Todman Productions, Sentinel Productions, Fenady Associates and The Tiger Company
February 18, 1966	The Chase	Co-production with Horizon Pictures
March 16, 1966	The Silencers	co-production with Meadway-Claude Productions
March 30, 1966	The Trouble with Angels	Co-production with William Frye Productions
March 1966	Three on a Couch	co-production with Jerry Lewis Productions
March 9, 1966	The Heroes of Telemark	US distribution only; produced by The Rank Organisation and Benton Film Productions
May 1966	Lost Command	co-production with Red Lion
June 22, 1966	Born Free	Nominee of the Golden Globe Award for Best Motion Picture – Drama; co-production with Open Road Films, Atlas and Highroad Productions
June 29, 1966	Walk, Don't Run	Co-production with Sol C. Siegel Productions
July 19, 1966	The Wrong Box	
July 1966	Every Day Is a Holiday	Co production with Guión Producciones Cinematográficas
August 3, 1966	The Man Called Flintstone	theatrical distribution only, produced by Hanna-Barbera Productions
August 10, 1966	A Study in Terror	U.S. distribution only; produced by Compton Films and Sir Nigel Films
August 1966	Birds Do It	Co-production with Ivan Tors Films
September 14, 1966	The Eavesdropper	U.S. distribution only; produced by Royal Films International and Producciones Leopoldo Torre Nilsson
September 27, 1966	Rings Around the World	
September 29, 1966	Kidnapped to Mystery Island	co-production with Eichberg-Film and Liber Film
September 1966	Last of the Renegades	U.S. distribution only; produced by Constantin Film, Atlantis Film and Jadran Film
October 12, 1966	Dead Heat on a Merry-Go-Round	
October 17, 1966	Georgy Girl	Co-production with Everglades Productions
October 1966	The Texican	co-production with M.C.R. Productions Inc. & Balcázar Producciones Cinematográficas
October 1966	Alvarez Kelly	Co-production with Sol C. Siegel Productions
November 4, 1966	The Professionals	Co-production with Pax Enterprises
November 1966	Frontier Hellcat	U.S. distribution only; produced by Constanstin Film, Jadran Film and Atlantis Films
November 1966	Traitor's Gate	U.S. distribution only; produced by Constanstin Film, Rialto Film and Summit
December 1966	Rage	
December 16, 1966	A Man for All Seasons	Winner of the Academy Award for Best Picture; Winner of the Golden Globe Award for Best Motion Picture – Drama
December 21, 1966	Murderers' Row	

== 1967 ==
Release date	Title	Notes
January 18, 1967	Goal! The World Cup	U.S. distribution only; Nominee of the BAFTA Award for Best Documentary
January 25, 1967	Kiss the Girls and Make Them Die	
January 26, 1967	The Deadly Affair	
February 24, 1967	The Night of the Generals	
February 25, 1967	Enter Laughing	
March 8, 1967	The Taming of the Shrew	Nominee of the Golden Globe Award for Best Motion Picture – Musical or Comedy
April 28, 1967	Casino Royale (Note: Owned by MGM, with copyright currently registered to Danjaq, LLC and Famous Artists Productions)	distribution only; co-production with Famous Artists Productions
May 1, 1967	40 Guns to Apache Pass	co-production with Admiral Pictures and Robert E. Kent Productions
May 3, 1967	Your Excellency	Mexican film; co-production with Posa Films
May 17, 1967	The Happening	
June 14, 1967	To Sir, with Love	
June 21, 1967	Divorce American Style	
July 12, 1967	The Big Mouth	
July 26, 1967	The Love-Ins	
July 28, 1967	Luv	
August 2, 1967	Good Times (Note: Owned by Disney (via ABC))	theatrical distribution only; produced by Motion Picture International Production
August 18, 1967	The Tiger Makes Out	
September 26, 1967	Who's Minding the Mint?	
October 1967	Young Americans	
November 1, 1967	A Time for Killing	
November 1967	Winnetou: Thunder at the Border	
December 12, 1967	Guess Who's Coming to Dinner	Nominee of the Academy Award for Best Picture Inducted into the National Film Registry in 2017
December 15, 1967	In Cold Blood	Nominee of the Golden Globe Award for Best Motion Picture – Drama Inducted into the National Film Registry in 2008
December 22, 1967	The Ambushers	

== 1968 ==
Release date	Title	Notes
1968	The Desperado Trail	
1968	Superargo Versus Diabolicus	
January 11, 1968	Berserk!	
January 17, 1968	How to Save a Marriage and Ruin Your Life	
February 6, 1968	Doctor Faustus	
March 4, 1968	30 Is a Dangerous Age, Cynthia	
March 10, 1968	The Queens	U.S. distribution of Italian & French film; co-production with Documento film; produced by Royal Films International
April 2, 1968	A Dandy in Aspic	
April 10, 1968	Where Angels Go, Trouble Follows	
April 1968	Up the MacGregors!	U.S. distribution of Italian film
May 15, 1968	The Swimmer	
June 5, 1968	For Singles Only	
June 1968	Assignment K	U.S. distribution of English film
July 2, 1968	Interlude	
July 12, 1968	Don't Raise the Bridge, Lower the River	
July 24, 1968	Anzio	
August 21, 1968	The Big Gundown	
September 6, 1968	Torture Garden	
September 11, 1968	Hammerhead	
September 16, 1968	Duffy	
September 19, 1968	Funny Girl	Nominee for the Academy Award for Best Picture; Nominee of the Golden Globe Award for Best Motion Picture – Musical or Comedy; Co-production with Rastar Inducted into the National Film Registry in 2016
November 20, 1968	Head (Note: Owned by Rhino Entertainment.)	produced by Raybert Productions.
November 1968	Seven Guns for the MacGregors	
December 4, 1968	Renegade Riders	
December 4, 1968	Corruption	
December 10, 1968	Oliver!	Winner of the Academy Award for Best Picture; Winner of the Golden Globe Award for Best Motion Picture – Musical or Comedy distribution only; produced by Romulus Films and Warwick Film Productions Limited
December 1968	With My Guns	U.S. distribution of Mexican film

== 1969 ==
Release date	Title	Notes
February 5, 1969	The Wrecking Crew	Co-production with Meadway-Claude Productions Company
March 11, 1969	Otley	Co-production with Bruce Cohn Curtis Films Ltd. and Open Road Films
March 21, 1969	Pendulum	
March 24, 1969	Before Winter Comes	
April 1, 1969	Model Shop	
April 30, 1969	The Desperados	
May 1, 1969	The Mad Room	
May 10, 1969	Mackenna's Gold	
May 14, 1969	Age of Consent	
May 28, 1969	The Southern Star	
June 6, 1969	Hook, Line & Sinker	
July 14, 1969	Easy Rider	Distribution only; produced by Pando Company and Raybert Productions. Inducted into the National Film Registry in 1998
July 23, 1969	Run Wild, Run Free	
July 23, 1969	Castle Keep	
September 17, 1969	Bob & Carol & Ted & Alice	
October 15, 1969	Lock Up Your Daughters	
October 1969	Man on Horseback	
November 19, 1969	The Comic	
December 11, 1969	Marooned	
December 16, 1969	Cactus Flower	Nominee of the Golden Globe Award for Best Motion Picture – Musical or Comedy
December 21, 1969	Hamlet	
December 1969	A Quixote Without La Mancha	U.S. distribution of a Mexican film

== See also ==
- List of Columbia Pictures films

== Bibliography ==
- Dick, Bernard F. Columbia Pictures: Portrait of a Studio. University Press of Kentucky, 2014.
