= List of Screen Gems films =

This article lists films which have been produced, distributed and/or co-distributed by Screen Gems as well as upcoming releases.

== 1999–2000s ==
Release date	Title	Notes
June 4, 1999	Limbo	co-production with Green/Renzi Productions; first film
July 9, 1999	Arlington Road (Note: Owned by Shamrock Holdings, with U.S. distribution rights currently licensed to Shout! Studios)	distribution in North and Latin America, South Africa, Portugal, Greece, Cyprus, Eastern Europe, the Middle East, Israel, Turkey and Asia excluding Japan only; produced by Lakeshore Entertainment
April 5, 2000	Black and White	co-production with Palm Pictures
April 28, 2000	Timecode	co-production with Red Mullet Productions
September 29, 2000	Girlfight (Note: Owned by the Independent Film Company)	North American, U.K. and Irish distribution only; produced by Independent Film Channel Productions and Green/Renzi Productions
December 6, 2000	Snatch	North American distribution only; produced by SKA Films
March 23, 2001	The Brothers	co-production with McHenry/Scott Productions
April 27, 2001	The Forsaken	co-production with Sandstorm Films
August 24, 2001	Ghosts of Mars	co-production with Storm King Productions; rights licensed to CTV International for France
September 7, 2001	Two Can Play That Game	co-production with C4 Pictures
January 25, 2002	The Mothman Prophecies	North American, South African, Australian and New Zealand distribution only; produced by Lakeshore Entertainment
February 1, 2002	Slackers	U.S. distribution only; produced by Alliance Atlantis and Original Film
March 15, 2002	Resident Evil	distribution in North and Latin America, Italy, India and China only; produced by Constantin Film, Davis Films, Impact Pictures and Capcom
October 11, 2002	Swept Away	distribution outside Italy only; produced by SKA Films
October 18, 2002	Formula 51 (Note: Owned by Lionsgate, with SP Releasing and FilmRise holding distribution outside of Canada.)	U.S. distribution only; produced by Alliance Atlantis and Grosvenor Park Productions
November 15, 2002	Half Past Dead	co-production with Franchise Pictures; rights licensed to Eagle Pictures for Italy
December 13, 2002	Lone Star State of Mind	co-production with Bedford Falls Company
August 22, 2003	The Medallion	home media distribution outside France and Asia only; produced by Emperor Multimedia Group; distributed theatrically by TriStar Pictures
September 19, 2003	Underworld	distribution in North America, Australia, New Zealand, South Africa and Italy only; produced by Lakeshore Entertainment
October 31, 2003	In the Cut	distribution in North and Latin America, Australia, New Zealand, South Africa, Eastern Europe, Japan and Spain only; produced by Pathé and Laurie Parker Productions; Japanese theatrical rights licensed to GAGA-Humax
January 30, 2004	You Got Served	co-production with The Ultimate Group and Melee Entertainment
May 14, 2004	Breakin' All the Rules	co-production with Lisa Tornell Productions
August 27, 2004	Anacondas: The Hunt for the Blood Orchid	co-production with Middle Fork Productions
September 10, 2004	Resident Evil: Apocalypse	distribution in the U.S., Latin America, the U.K., Ireland, Australia, New Zealand, South Africa, Japan, Italy, Spain, Scandinavia, Portugal and India only; produced by Constantin Film, Davis Films, Impact Pictures and Capcom
February 4, 2005	Boogeyman	North American, Spanish and Indian distribution only; produced by Ghost House Pictures and Senator International
March 25, 2005	D.E.B.S.	distribution only; produced by Destination Films, Anonymous Content and Samuel Goldwyn Films
August 26, 2005	The Cave	distribution in North and Latin America, South Africa, Australia, New Zealand, France, Italy, Spain, the Benelux, Eastern Europe, the CIS and Portugal only; produced by Lakeshore Entertainment and Cinerenta
September 9, 2005	The Exorcism of Emily Rose	co-production with Lakeshore Entertainment
October 7, 2005	The Gospel	co-production with Rainforest Films
January 6, 2006	Hostel	international theatrical and worldwide home media distribution only; co-acquisition with Lions Gate Films; produced by Next Entertainment and Raw Nerve; rights licensed to Pyramid for the CIS
January 20, 2006	Underworld: Evolution	distribution outside the U.K., Ireland, France, Spain, Portugal, Greece, Cyprus, Eastern Europe, the Baltics, the CIS, the Middle East, Iceland, Turkey, Korea, Indonesia, Thailand and the Philippines only; produced by Lakeshore Entertainment
February 3, 2006	When a Stranger Calls	co-production with Davis Entertainment
March 3, 2006	Ultraviolet	co-production with John Baldecchi Productions; rights licensed to Pyramid for the CIS
September 8, 2006	The Covenant	co-production with Lakeshore Entertainment and Sandstorm Films; rights licensed to Pyramid for the CIS
January 12, 2007	Stomp the Yard	co-production with Rainforest Films
February 2, 2007	The Messengers	North American co-distribution with Columbia Pictures only; produced by Ghost House Pictures and Blue Star Pictures
April 20, 2007	Vacancy	co-production with Hal Lieberman Company; rights licensed to Pyramid for the CIS
June 8, 2007	Hostel: Part II	international theatrical and worldwide home media distribution only; co-acquisition with Lionsgate; produced by Next Entertainment and Raw Nerve; rights licensed to Pyramid for the CIS
September 7, 2007	The Brothers Solomon (Note: Sony now owns worldwide rights to this film through a licensing deal struck with Revolution Studios in October 2019)	theatrical distribution outside Scandinavia, Portugal and Israel only; produced by Revolution Studios and Carsey-Werner Productions
September 21, 2007	Resident Evil: Extinction	distribution in North and Latin America, the U.K., Ireland, Australia, New Zealand, South Africa, Italy, Spain, Scandinavia, Eastern Europe, the Baltics, Portugal, China, Japan and India only; produced by Constantin Film, Davis Films, Impact Pictures and Capcom
November 21, 2007	This Christmas	co-production with Rainforest Films
January 11, 2008	First Sunday	co-production with Cube Vision
January 25, 2008	Untraceable	North and Latin American and Japanese distribution only; produced by Lakeshore Entertainment
April 11, 2008	Prom Night	distribution outside Canada only; co-production with Original Film, Newmarket Films and Alliance Films
September 19, 2008	Lakeview Terrace	co-production with Overbrook Entertainment
October 10, 2008	Quarantine	distribution outside Spain only; co-production with Vertigo Entertainment and Filmax
January 23, 2009	Underworld: Rise of the Lycans	distribution outside the U.K., Ireland and France only; produced by Lakeshore Entertainment and Sketch Films
February 20, 2009	Fired Up!	co-production with Moving Pictures, Gross Entertainment and Weinstock Productions
April 24, 2009	Obsessed	co-production with Rainforest Films
October 16, 2009	The Stepfather	co-production with Maverick Films, Imprint Entertainment and Granada Productions
December 4, 2009	Armored	co-production with Stars Road Entertainment and Farah Films

== 2010s ==
Release date	Title	Notes
January 22, 2010	Legion	co-production with Bold Films
February 5, 2010	Dear John	U.S., Latin American, Italian, Spanish and Israeli distribution only; produced by Relativity Media and Temple Hill Entertainment
April 16, 2010	Death at a Funeral	co-production with Sidney Kimmel Entertainment
August 27, 2010	Takers	co-production with Rainforest Films
September 10, 2010	Resident Evil: Afterlife	distribution outside Canada theatrically, France, Germany, Austria, Switzerland, the Benelux, Greece, Cyprus, the Middle East, Israel, Turkey, Hong Kong, Indonesia, the Philippines, Thailand and Vietnam only; produced by Constantin Film, Davis Films, Impact Pictures and Capcom; rights licensed to DMG Entertainment for China
September 17, 2010	Easy A	co-production with Olive Bridge Entertainment
November 24, 2010	Burlesque	co-production with De Line Pictures
December 22, 2010	Country Strong	co-production with Maguire Pictures
February 4, 2011	The Roommate	co-production with Vertigo Entertainment
May 13, 2011	Priest	co-production with Tokyopop
July 22, 2011	Friends with Benefits	co-production with Castle Rock Entertainment, Zucker Productions and Olive Bridge Entertainment
July 29, 2011	Attack the Block	North and Latin American, South African and Eastern European co-distribution with Stage 6 Films only; produced by StudioCanal, Film4, UK Film Council and Big Talk Pictures
September 16, 2011	Straw Dogs	co-production with Battleplan Productions
January 20, 2012	Underworld: Awakening	distribution outside the U.K., Ireland and France only; produced by Lakeshore Entertainment and Sketch Films
February 10, 2012	The Vow	distribution outside Scandinavia, Portugal, Greece, Cyprus, Israel, Poland and Hungary only; produced by Spyglass Entertainment
April 20, 2012	Think Like a Man	co-production with Rainforest Films
September 14, 2012	Resident Evil: Retribution	distribution outside Canada theatrically, France, Germany, Austria and Switzerland only; produced by Constantin Film, Davis Films, Impact Pictures and Capcom
August 21, 2013	The Mortal Instruments: City of Bones	U.S. distribution only; produced by Constantin Film and Unique Features
September 20, 2013	Battle of the Year	co-production with Contrafilm
October 18, 2013	Carrie (Note: Owned by MGM)	theatrical distribution outside Scandinavia, Portugal, Poland, Hungary, Romania, Bulgaria, Czech Republic, Slovakia, the Middle East and Israel only; produced by Metro-Goldwyn-Mayer and Misher Films
February 14, 2014	About Last Night	co-production with Rainforest Films and Olive Bridge Entertainment
June 20, 2014	Think Like a Man Too	co-production with Will Packer Productions
July 2, 2014	Deliver Us from Evil	co-production with Jerry Bruckheimer Films
September 12, 2014	No Good Deed	co-production with Will Packer Productions
January 16, 2015	The Wedding Ringer	co-production with Miramax and Will Packer Productions
September 11, 2015	The Perfect Guy	co-production with Rocklin/Faust Productions
February 5, 2016	Pride and Prejudice and Zombies	U.S. distribution only; produced by Cross Creek Pictures, Sierra Pictures, QC Entertainment, Allison Shearmur Productions, Handsomecharlie Films, MadRiver Pictures and Head Gear Films
August 26, 2016	Don't Breathe	co-production with Stage 6 Films and Ghost House Pictures
September 9, 2016	When the Bough Breaks	co-production with Unique Features
January 6, 2017	Underworld: Blood Wars	distribution only; produced by Lakeshore Entertainment and Sketch Films
January 27, 2017	Resident Evil: The Final Chapter	distribution outside France, Germany, Austria, Switzerland and China only; produced by Constantin Film, Davis Films, Impact Pictures and Capcom
October 31, 2017	Keep Watching	distribution in the U.S., Latin America, the U.K., Ireland, France, Germany, Austria, Switzerland, Spain, the Benelux, Eastern Europe, the CIS, Australia, New Zealand, Japan and Korea only; produced by Voltage Pictures
January 12, 2018	Proud Mary	co-production with Paul Schiff Productions
August 10, 2018	Slender Man	co-production with Mythology Entertainment and Madhouse Entertainment
August 24, 2018	Searching	co-distribution with Stage 6 Films only; produced by the Bazelevs Company
November 30, 2018	The Possession of Hannah Grace	co-production with Broken Road Productions
May 3, 2019	The Intruder	distribution only; produced by Hidden Empire Film Group and Primary Wave Entertainment
May 24, 2019	Brightburn	co-distribution with Stage 6 Films only; produced by The H Collective and Troll Court Entertainment; co-distributed theatrically in Japan by Rakuten and Toho-Towa
October 25, 2019	Black and Blue	co-production with Royal Viking Entertainment and Hidden Empire Film Group

== 2020s ==
Release date	Title	Notes
January 3, 2020	The Grudge	co-production with Stage 6 Films and Ghost House Pictures
December 18, 2020	Monster Hunter	distribution outside Germany, Austria, Switzerland, China, Hong Kong and Japan only; produced by Constantin Film, Tencent Pictures, Toho and AB^{2} Digital Pictures
April 2, 2021	The Unholy	co-production with Ghost House Pictures
August 13, 2021	Don't Breathe 2	co-production with Stage 6 Films, Ghost House Pictures and Bad Hombre
November 24, 2021	Resident Evil: Welcome to Raccoon City	distribution outside Canada theatrically, France, Germany, Austria and Switzerland only; produced by Constantin Film, Davis Raccoon Films and Capcom
March 14, 2022	Blink	short film; co-production with Ground Control
August 26, 2022	The Invitation	co-production with Mid Atlantic Films
January 20, 2023	Missing	co-production with Stage 6 Films, Bazelevs Company and Search Party Productions
April 14, 2023	The Pope's Exorcist	co-production with 2.0 Entertainment and Loyola Productions
May 5, 2023	Love Again	distribution outside Germany, Austria and Switzerland only; co-production with 2.0 Entertainment and Thunder Road Films
May 26, 2023	The Machine	distribution outside China only; produced by Legendary Entertainment, Uh Hundred Percent Productions and Levity Productions
July 7, 2023	Insidious: The Red Door	co-production with Stage 6 Films and Blumhouse Productions
May 3, 2024	Tarot	co-production with Alloy Entertainment and Ground Control
February 7, 2025	Heart Eyes	North American distribution only; produced by Spyglass Media Group and Divide/Conquer
April 25, 2025	Until Dawn	co-production with PlayStation Productions, Vertigo Entertainment, Coin Operated and Mangata
July 18, 2025	I Know What You Did Last Summer	studio credit only; co-production with Columbia Pictures and Original Film
November 21, 2025	Sisu: Road to Revenge	co-distribution with Stage 6 Films outside Finland only; produced by Subzero Film Entertainment and Good Chaos
July 10, 2026	Evil Dead Burn	international distribution outside the U.K., Ireland, France and Russia only; co-production with New Line Cinema and Ghost House Pictures; distributed in North America by Warner Bros. Pictures
August 21, 2026	Insidious: Out of the Further	co-distribution with Stage 6 Films only; produced by Blumhouse Atomic Monster

== Upcoming ==
Release date	Title	Notes
April 7, 2028	Evil Dead Wrath	international distribution outside the U.K., Ireland, France and Russia only; co-production with New Line Cinema and Ghost House Pictures; distributed in North America by Warner Bros. Pictures

=== Undated films ===
Release date	Title	Notes	Production Status
TBA
TBA	Border Patrol	co-production with Atomic Monster	In development
TBA	Delilah	co-production with Ground Control Entertainment	In development
TBA	Final Boarding		In development
TBA	The Haunting in Wicker Park		Completed
TBA	Island of the Dolls	co-production with Crypt TV	In development
TBA	Malibu	co-production with Spooky Pictures	In development
TBA	Mime	co-production with Crooked Highway	Pre-production
TBA	Miss Conception	co-production with Brownstone Productions	In development
TBA	Mouthwashing	co-production with Crooked Highway	In development
TBA	Obey	co-production with Waypoint Entertainment and Spooky Pictures	Pre-production
TBA	Paradise Court	co-production with Assemble Media	In development
TBA	Pulse	co-production with Spyglass Media Group and Bad Feeling	In development
TBA	Room 428	co-production with Crooked Highway	In development
TBA	Sabine	co-production with 21 Laps Entertainment	In development
TBA	Summertime	co-production with Westbrook Studios and Davis Entertainment	In development
TBA	Two and Only	co-production with Sad Unicorn	Pre-production
TBA	Untitled comedy	co-production with Broken Road Productions	In development
TBA	Urban Legend	co-production with Coin Operated and Original Film	In development
TBA	White Knight	co-production with Unknown Quantity	In development
TBA	Wolf Night	co-production with Platinum Dunes	In development
