= List of TriStar Pictures films =

This is a list of films produced and/or released by American film studio TriStar Pictures. Some of the films listed here were distributed theatrically in the United States by the company's distribution division, Sony Pictures Releasing (formerly known as Triumph Releasing Corporation (1982–1994) and Columbia TriStar Film Distributors International (1988–2005).

== 1980s ==
Release date	Title	Notes
April 6, 1984	Where the Boys Are '84 (Note: Owned by ITV Studios)	theatrical distribution only; produced by ITC Entertainment
May 11, 1984	The Natural	co-production with Delphi II Productions
July 13, 1984	The Muppets Take Manhattan	co-production with Henson Associates and Delphi II Productions
July 27, 1984	Meatballs Part II	
August 31, 1984	Flashpoint (Note: Owned by Warner Bros. (via HBO))	theatrical distribution only; produced by HBO Pictures
September 7, 1984	The Last Winter	
September 21, 1984	The Evil That Men Do	
September 21, 1984	Places in the Heart	Nominee of the Academy Award for Best Picture co-production with Delphi II Productions
October 12, 1984	Songwriter	
November 2, 1984	Blame It on the Night	
November 2, 1984	Lovelines	
November 9, 1984	Silent Night, Deadly Night	limited release; theatrical distribution only
November 21, 1984	Supergirl (Note: Owned by Warner Bros.)	theatrical distribution only; produced by Pueblo Film
December 14, 1984	Runaway	co-production with Delphi III Productions
December 21, 1984	Birdy	co-production with A&M Records and Delphi III Productions
December 21, 1984	Breakin' 2: Electric Boogaloo (Note: Owned by MGM)	theatrical distribution only; produced by The Cannon Group
February 8, 1985	Heaven Help Us	theatrical distribution only; produced by HBO Pictures
March 22, 1985	The Last Dragon	co-production with Motown Productions and Delphi III Productions
April 3, 1985	Alamo Bay	co-production with Delphi IV Productions
May 1, 1985	Little Treasure	
May 3, 1985	Private Resort	co-production with Delphi III Productions
May 22, 1985	Rambo: First Blood Part II (Note: Owned by StudioCanal, with U.S. distribution rights split between Rialto Pictures and Lionsgate)	U.S. and select international theatrical distribution only; produced by Carolco Pictures
June 21, 1985	Lifeforce	
July 19, 1985	The Legend of Billie Jean	co-production with Delphi III Productions
August 7, 1985	Real Genius	co-production with Delphi III Productions
August 16, 1985	Volunteers	theatrical distribution only; produced by HBO Pictures
October 4, 1985	Sweet Dreams	theatrical distribution only; produced by HBO Pictures
October 25, 1985	My Man Adam	
November 27, 1985	Santa Claus: The Movie	theatrical distribution only; produced by St. Michael Finance Limited
January 3, 1986	Head Office	theatrical distribution only; produced by HBO Pictures
January 17, 1986	Iron Eagle	
February 14, 1986	La Cage aux Folles 3: The Wedding	
February 21, 1986	The Hitcher	theatrical distribution only; produced by HBO Pictures
March 21, 1986	Rad (Note: Owned by Utopia)	theatrical distribution only; produced by TaliaFilm II Productions
March 1986	Odd Jobs	theatrical distribution only; produced by HBO Pictures
April 11, 1986	Band of the Hand	co-production with Delphi V Productions
April 25, 1986	8 Million Ways to Die	theatrical distribution only; produced by PSO Productions, Inc.
May 9, 1986	Short Circuit	co-production with PSO Productions, Inc. and The Turman-Foster Company
June 27, 1986	Labyrinth (Note: Owned by the Jim Henson Company, with select non-theatrical rights currently licensed to Shout! Studios; Sony retains theatrical rights)	co-production with Henson Associates and Lucasfilm
July 2, 1986	About Last Night...	co-production with Delphi V Productions
July 30, 1986	Nothing in Common	co-production with Delphi Films and Rastar
August 22, 1986	Night of the Creeps	
August 22, 1986	Touch and Go	
October 10, 1986	Peggy Sue Got Married	co-production with American Zoetrope, Delphi V Productions and Rastar
October 31, 1986	Let's Get Harry	
November 7, 1986	The Boss' Wife	
November 14, 1986	Every Time We Say Goodbye	co-production with Delphi V Productions
December 19, 1986	No Mercy	co-production with Delphi Productions
February 6, 1987	Light of Day (Note: Owned by Paramount Pictures (via Melange Pictures))	theatrical distribution only; produced by Taft Entertainment
March 6, 1987	Angel Heart	U.S. and select international theatrical distribution only; produced by Carolco Pictures
March 27, 1987	Blind Date	co-production with Delphi Productions
April 24, 1987	Extreme Prejudice	U.S. and select international theatrical distribution only; produced by Carolco Pictures
April 24, 1987	Forever, Lulu	
May 8, 1987	Gardens of Stone	co-production with American Zoetrope and ML Delphi Premier Productions
May 22, 1987	Amazing Grace and Chuck	co-production with Delphi Productions and Rastar
July 10, 1987	The Squeeze	
August 1, 1987	Love at Stake (Note: Owned by MGM (via Orion Pictures))	
August 7, 1987	Nadine	co-production with ML Delphi Premier Productions
August 14, 1987	The Monster Squad	theatrical distribution only; produced by Taft Entertainment
September 18, 1987	The Principal	co-production with ML Delphi Premier Productions
October 2, 1987	Like Father Like Son	co-production with Imagine Entertainment
October 9, 1987	Man on Fire	theatrical distribution only
October 23, 1987	Suspect	co-production with ML Delphi Premier Productions
November 13, 1987	The Running Man	theatrical distribution only; produced by Taft Entertainment
December 18, 1987	Gaby: A True Story	
December 18, 1987	High Tide	
December 18, 1987	Ironweed	theatrical distribution only; produced by Taft Entertainment
January 15, 1988	For Keeps	co-production with ML Delphi Premier Productions
March 4, 1988	Switching Channels	
March 18, 1988	Pound Puppies and the Legend of Big Paw	U.S. and select international theatrical distribution only; produced by Carolco Pictures
April 1, 1988	The Seventh Sign	co-production with Interscope Communications and ML Delphi Premier Productions
April 29, 1988	Sunset	co-production with ML Delphi Premier Productions
May 25, 1988	Rambo III	U.S. and select international theatrical distribution only; produced by Carolco Pictures
June 17, 1988	Red Heat	U.S. and select international theatrical distribution only; produced by Carolco Pictures
July 6, 1988	Short Circuit 2	co-production with The Turman-Foster Company
August 5, 1988	The Blob	
September 23, 1988	Sweet Hearts Dance	co-production with ML Delphi Premier Productions
October 14, 1988	The Kiss	co-production with Astral Film Enterprises
October 21, 1988	Bat*21	theatrical distribution only; produced by Vision PDG
November 11, 1988	Iron Eagle II	U.S. and select international theatrical distribution only; produced by Carolco Pictures
November 18, 1988	High Spirits	theatrical distribution only; produced by Vision PDG
November 30, 1988	Made in U.S.A.	
January 13, 1989	DeepStar Six	U.S. and select international theatrical distribution only; produced by Carolco Pictures
February 3, 1989	Who's Harry Crumb?	
February 10, 1989	Tap	
March 10, 1989	Chances Are	
March 17, 1989	Slaves of New York	
March 31, 1989	Sing	
April 28, 1989	Loverboy	
May 5, 1989	Field of Dreams (Note: Owned by Universal Pictures)	Nominee of the Academy Award for Best Picture; select international theatrical distribution only with Carolco Pictures; produced by Universal Pictures and Gordon Company
May 12, 1989	See No Evil, Hear No Evil	
May 19, 1989	Fright Night Part 2	international theatrical distribution only
August 4, 1989	Lock Up	U.S. and select international theatrical distribution only; produced by Carolco Pictures
September 29, 1989	Johnny Handsome	U.S. and select international theatrical distribution only; produced by Carolco Pictures
October 13, 1989	Look Who's Talking	
October 27, 1989	The Bear	North American, U.K., Irish, Australian and New Zealand distribution only
October 27, 1989	Shocker (Note: International rights owned by StudioCanal)	select international theatrical distribution only with Carolco Pictures; produced by Universal Pictures and Alive Films
November 15, 1989	Steel Magnolias	co-production with Rastar
December 15, 1989	Family Business	co-production with Regency International Pictures and Gordon Company
December 15, 1989	Glory	Inducted into the National Film Registry in 2025
December 22, 1989	Music Box	U.S. and select international theatrical distribution only; produced by Carolco Pictures

== 1990s ==
Release date	Title	Notes
February 9, 1990	Loose Cannons	
February 23, 1990	Mountains of the Moon	distribution in North America theatrically, Latin America, France, the Benelux, Spain, Portugal, Israel, Australia and New Zealand only; produced by Carolco Pictures
March 16, 1990	Blind Fury	co-production with Interscope Communications
March 30, 1990	Side Out	co-production with Aurora Productions
April 6, 1990	I Love You to Death	
April 27, 1990	Q & A (Note: Owned by Disney (via 20th Century Studios))	North American theatrical distribution only; produced by Regency International Pictures and Odyssey Distributors
June 1, 1990	Total Recall	distribution in North America theatrically, Latin America, France, the Benelux, Spain, Portugal, Israel, India, Australia and New Zealand only; produced by Carolco Pictures
July 20, 1990	The Freshman	
August 10, 1990	Air America	distribution in North America theatrically, Latin America, French-speaking Belgium and Spain only; produced by Carolco Pictures
September 21, 1990	Narrow Margin	distribution in North America theatrically, Latin America, French-speaking Belgium and Spain only; produced by Carolco Pictures
October 5, 1990	Avalon	co-production with Baltimore Pictures
November 2, 1990	Jacob's Ladder	North American theatrical and Latin American distribution only; produced by Carolco Pictures
December 14, 1990	Look Who's Talking Too	
February 8, 1991	L.A. Story	distribution in North America theatrically, Latin America, France, French-speaking Belgium, Germany, Austria, Scandinavia, Australia and New Zealand only; produced by Carolco Pictures
March 1, 1991	The Doors	distribution in North America theatrically, Latin America, France, French-speaking Belgium, Germany, Austria, Scandinavia, Australia and New Zealand only; produced by Carolco Pictures
April 26, 1991	Toy Soldiers	co-production with Island World
May 24, 1991	Hudson Hawk	co-production with Silver Pictures
July 3, 1991	Terminator 2: Judgment Day	distribution in North America theatrically, Latin America, France, French-speaking Belgium, Spain, Germany, Austria, Scandinavia, Australia and New Zealand only; produced by Carolco Pictures; Inducted into the National Film Registry in 2023
July 26, 1991	Another You	
August 9, 1991	Bingo	
September 20, 1991	The Fisher King	
December 11, 1991	Hook	co-production with Amblin Entertainment
December 20, 1991	Bugsy	Nominee of the Academy Award for Best Picture co-production with Mulholland Productions and Baltimore Pictures
March 20, 1992	Basic Instinct	distribution in the U.S. theatrically, Latin America, French-speaking Belgium, Scandinavia and India only; produced by Carolco Pictures
April 3, 1992	Thunderheart	co-production with Tribeca Productions and Waterhorse Productions
April 17, 1992	City of Joy	North American distribution only; co-production with Lightmotive
July 10, 1992	Universal Soldier	distribution in North America theatrically, Latin America, France, French-speaking Belgium, Spain, Germany, Austria, Scandinavia, Australia and New Zealand only; produced by Carolco Pictures
September 11, 1992	Wind	North American distribution only; produced by American Zoetrope
September 18, 1992	Husbands and Wives	co-production with Rollins/Joffe Productions
October 16, 1992	Candyman	North and Latin American, German, Austrian and Korean distribution only; co-production with PolyGram Filmed Entertainment and Propaganda Films
December 25, 1992	Chaplin	distribution in North America theatrically, Latin America, French-speaking Belgium, Spain and Scandinavia only; produced by Carolco Pictures
January 29, 1993	Sniper	co-production with Baltimore Pictures
May 28, 1993	Cliffhanger	distribution in North and Latin America, France, French-speaking Belgium, Germany, Austria, Spain, Scandinavia, Australia, New Zealand and India only; produced by Carolco Pictures
June 25, 1993	Sleepless in Seattle	co-production with Gary Foster Productions
July 9, 1993	Weekend at Bernie's II	North American distribution only
July 30, 1993	So I Married an Axe Murderer	co-production with Fried/Woods Films
August 18, 1993	Manhattan Murder Mystery	co-production with Rollins/Joffe Productions
August 20, 1993	Wilder Napalm	co-production with Baltimore Pictures
October 8, 1993	Mr. Jones	co-production with Rastar
October 22, 1993	Rudy	co-production with Fried/Woods Films
November 5, 1993	Look Who's Talking Now!	co-production with Jonathan D. Krane Productions
December 22, 1993	Philadelphia	co-production with Clinica Estetico Productions; Inducted into the National Film Registry in 2025
March 11, 1994	Guarding Tess	co-production with Channel Productions
April 8, 1994	Threesome	co-production with Motion Picture Corporation of America and Krevoy/Stabler Productions
April 15, 1994	Cops & Robbersons	co-production with Channel Productions
May 6, 1994	3 Ninjas Kick Back	
July 29, 1994	It Could Happen to You	co-production with Adelson/Baumgarten and Lobell/Bergman Productions
August 26, 1994	Wagons East	North American theatrical distribution only; produced by Carolco Pictures
September 16, 1994	Princess Caraboo (Note: Owned by Beacon Pictures, with U.S. distribution rights currently licensed to Shout! Studios)	distribution in North and Latin America, Japan and Southeast Asia only; produced by Beacon Communications
October 7, 1994	Only You	co-production with Fried/Woods Films and Yorktown Productions
November 4, 1994	Mary Shelley's Frankenstein	co-production with Japan Satellite Broadcasting, Inc., The IndieProd Company and American Zoetrope
December 21, 1994	Mixed Nuts	co-production with Witt/Thomas Productions
December 23, 1994	Legends of the Fall	co-production with Bedford Falls Productions and Pangaea Productions
February 10, 1995	The Quick and the Dead	co-production with Japan Satellite Broadcasting, Inc. and IndieProd Productions
March 3, 1995	Hideaway	co-production with S/Q Productions
March 10, 1995	3 Ninjas Knuckle Up	
April 12, 1995	Jury Duty	co-production with Triumph Films, Ben-Ami/Lenkov Productions and Weasel Productions
May 26, 1995	Johnny Mnemonic	distribution in the U.S., Latin America, France, German-speaking Europe, the Benelux, Portugal, Israel, Japan and Korea only; co-production with Peter Hoffman Productions and Alliance Communications
August 30, 1995	Magic in the Water	co-production with Triumph Films, Oxford Film Company and Pacific Motion Pictures
September 29, 1995	Devil in a Blue Dress	co-production with Clinica Estetico Productions and Mundy Lane Entertainment
October 20, 1995	Never Talk to Strangers	distribution in the U.S., Latin America, the U.K., Ireland, France, the Benelux, Czech Republic, India, Greece, Israel and Japan only; co-production with Peter Hoffman Productions and Alliance Communications
December 15, 1995	Jumanji	co-production with Interscope Communications and Teitler Film
February 23, 1996	Mary Reilly	co-production with Channel Productions
March 8, 1996	If Lucy Fell	co-production with Motion Picture Corporation of America and Krevoy/Stabler Productions
March 22, 1996	Race the Sun	co-production with Morrow/Heus Productions
April 19, 1996	Mrs. Winterbourne	co-production with A&M Records
April 26, 1996	Sunset Park	co-production with Jersey Films
August 2, 1996	Matilda	co-production with Jersey Films
August 16, 1996	The Fan	North American and select international distribution only; co-production with Mandalay Pictures
October 25, 1996	High School High	co-production with Zucker Productions
November 15, 1996	The Mirror Has Two Faces	distribution outside continental European television and Japan only; co-production with Phoenix Pictures
December 13, 1996	Jerry Maguire	Nominee of the Academy Award for Best Picture co-production with Gracie Films
January 17, 1997	Beverly Hills Ninja	co-production with Motion Picture Corporation of America and Krevoy/Stabler Productions
February 7, 1997	The Pest	co-production with The Bubble Factory
February 28, 1997	Donnie Brasco	North American and select international distribution only; produced by Mandalay Pictures and Baltimore Pictures
May 16, 1997	The Second Jungle Book: Mowgli & Baloo	distribution only; produced by MDP Worldwide, Kiplinbook and Raju Productions
June 20, 1997	My Best Friend's Wedding	co-production with Zucker Productions and Predawn Productions
October 3, 1997	U Turn (Note: Co-owned by Content Partners, LLC)	distribution outside continental European television and Japan only; produced by Phoenix Pictures
October 10, 1997	Seven Years in Tibet	North American and select international distribution only; produced by Mandalay Pictures
November 7, 1997	Starship Troopers	North American distribution only; co-production with Touchstone Pictures
December 25, 1997	As Good as It Gets	Nominee of the Academy Award for Best Picture co-production with Gracie Films
January 23, 1998	Slappy and the Stinkers	co-production with The Bubble Factory
January 23, 1998	Swept from the Sea	distribution outside continental European television and Japan only; produced by Phoenix Pictures
January 30, 1998	Desperate Measures	North American and select international distribution only; produced by Mandalay Pictures
February 20, 1998	Love Walked In	distribution only; produced by JEMPSA Entertainment and Apostle Pictures
March 6, 1998	Hush	co-production with Red Wagon Entertainment
April 10, 1998	3 Ninjas: High Noon at Mega Mountain	
April 17, 1998	Homegrown	co-production with Lakeshore Entertainment and Rollercoaster Films
April 24, 1998	The Big Hit	co-production with Amen Ra Films, Zide/Perry Productions and Lion Rock Productions
April 24, 1998	In God's Hands	co-production with Tom Stern Productions
May 1, 1998	Dancer, Texas Pop. 81	co-production with HSX Films, Chase Productions and Caribou Pictures
May 20, 1998	Godzilla	distribution outside Japan only; co-production with Centropolis Entertainment, Fried Films and Independent Pictures
July 10, 1998	Madeline	co-production with Jaffilms
July 17, 1998	The Mask of Zorro	co-production with Amblin Entertainment
September 4, 1998	Knock Off	distribution in North America, the U.K., Ireland, France, the Benelux, Arabia, Turkey, Australia and New Zealand only; produced by MDP Worldwide and Film Workshop
September 25, 1998	Urban Legend	distribution outside continental European television and Japan only; produced by Phoenix Pictures and Original Film
October 23, 1998	Apt Pupil	distribution outside continental European television and Japan only; produced by Phoenix Pictures and Bad Hat Harry Productions
December 18, 1998	Outside Ozona	distribution only; produced by Millennium Films and Sandstorm Films
February 19, 1999	Jawbreaker	co-production with Kramer-Tornell Productions and Crossroads Films
March 12, 1999	Baby Geniuses	co-production with Crystal Sky Pictures
July 2, 1999	Virtual Sexuality	British film; distribution only; produced by The Bridge and Noel Gay Motion Picture Company
August 20, 1999	Universal Soldier: The Return	
October 29, 1999	The Suburbans	co-production with Ignite Entertainment and Motion Picture Corporation of America

== 2000s ==
Release date	Title	Notes
April 25, 2000	Fortress 2: Re-Entry	distribution only; produced by Gower Productions, John Flock Productions and The Carousel Picture Company
August 18, 2000	Godzilla 2000	North American distribution only; produced by Toho Company, Ltd.
May 4, 2001	Time and Tide	distribution only; produced by Film Workshop
June 22, 2001	The Trumpet of the Swan	co-production with RichCrest Animation Studios
June 29, 2001	The Crimson Rivers	U.S. theatrical distribution only; produced by Gaumont, Légende Entreprises, TF1 Films Production and Canal+
January 25, 2002	Metropolis	co-distribution outside Japan with Destination Films only; produced by Madhouse
April 12, 2002	New Best Friend (Note: Co-owned by Samuel Goldwyn Films)	distribution only; produced by FGM Entertainment
August 23, 2002	Little Secrets	co-distribution with Samuel Goldwyn Films only
August 30, 2002	Love and a Bullet	theatrical distribution only; produced by Ramcity Productions and Key Entertainment
September 27, 2002	Wasabi	U.S. and select international distribution only; produced by EuropaCorp
August 22, 2003	The Medallion	theatrical distribution only; produced by Emperor Multimedia Group
March 12, 2004	The Lost Skeleton of Cadavra	co-production with Transom Films, Valenti Entertainment and Fragmighty
June 3, 2005	Lords of Dogtown	co-distribution with Columbia Pictures; co-production with Senator International
September 30, 2005	Oliver Twist	North and South American distribution only; co-production with RP Productions, Runteam II Ltd. and ETIC Films
April 21, 2006	Silent Hill	U.S. and Latin American distribution only; co-production with Davis Films and Konami
September 1, 2006	Crossover	co-production with 360 Pictures
October 27, 2006	Running with Scissors	co-production with Plan B Entertainment
March 16, 2007	Premonition	North American distribution only; co-production with Metro-Goldwyn-Mayer, Hyde Park Entertainment and Offspring Entertainment
April 27, 2007	Wind Chill	co-production with Blueprint Pictures and Section Eight Productions
July 27, 2007	I Know Who Killed Me	North American, German and Austrian distribution only; co-production with 360 Pictures
August 8, 2007	Daddy Day Camp	co-production with Revolution Studios, Davis Entertainment and Blue Star Entertainment
September 7, 2007	The Brothers Solomon (Note: Sony now owns worldwide rights to this film through a licensing deal struck with Revolution Studios in October 2019)	home video distribution outside Scandinavia, Portugal and Israel only; co-production with Revolution Studios and Carsey-Werner Productions
October 5, 2007	Feel the Noise	co-production with Sony BMG Film and Nuyorican Productions
April 18, 2008	88 Minutes	North American and select international distribution only; produced by Millennium Films, Emmett/Furla Films and Equity Pictures
October 24, 2008	Passengers	North American distribution only; co-production with Mandate Pictures, Persistent Entertainment and Intuition Films
December 5, 2008	Cadillac Records	co-production with Sony Music Film and Parkwood Entertainment
August 14, 2009	District 9	Nominee of the Academy Award for Best Picture distribution in North and Latin America, the U.K., Ireland, Germany, Austria, Switzerland, the Benelux, Greece, Cyprus, Italy, Spain, the Baltics, the CIS, Portugal, Australia, New Zealand, South Africa, Hong Kong and Korea only; co-production with Block/Hanson Productions and WingNut Films
November 20, 2009	Planet 51	U.S., German, Austrian and Swiss distribution only; co-production with Ilion Animation Studios and HandMade Films; co-distributed theatrically by Hoyts Distribution in Australia and New Zealand, UGC Distribution in France, DeAPlaneta in Spain, Videocine in Mexico, Enec Cine in Uruguay and Paradise Group in the CIS

== 2010s ==
Release date	Title	Notes
November 24, 2010	Faster	international distribution only; co-production with CBS Films, Castle Rock Entertainment and State Street Pictures
April 8, 2011	Soul Surfer	distribution outside Europe, Russia and Japan only; co-production with FilmDistrict, Enticing Entertainment, Island Film Group, Affirm Films, Brookwell McNamara Entertainment, Life's a Beach Entertainment and Mandalay Vision
May 6, 2011	Jumping the Broom	co-production with Stage 6 Films and Our Stories Films
August 26, 2011	Colombiana	North and Latin American co-distribution with Stage 6 Films only; produced by EuropaCorp, TF1 Films Production, Grive Productions and Canal+
September 30, 2011	Courageous	co-production with Sherwood Pictures, Provident Films, Affirm Films and Kendrick Brothers Productions
August 17, 2012	Sparkle	co-production with Stage 6 Films
September 28, 2012	Looper	US distribution only; co-production with FilmDistrict, Endgame Entertainment and DMG Entertainment
March 15, 2013	The Call	North American, Scandinavian and South African co-distribution with Stage 6 Films only; produced by Troika Pictures, WWE Studios, Amasia Entertainment and Apotheosis Media Group
April 5, 2013	Evil Dead	distribution outside the U.K., Ireland and France only; co-production with FilmDistrict and Ghost House Pictures
August 2, 2013	2 Guns	international co-distribution outside the U.K., Ireland, Latin America, the Middle East, Turkey and Thailand with Stage 6 Films only; produced by Marc Platt Productions, Oasis Ventures Entertainment, Envision Entertainment, Herrick Entertainment and Boom! Studios
August 9, 2013	Elysium	co-production with Media Rights Capital, QED International and Kinberg Genre
August 30, 2013	One Direction: This Is Us	co-production with Syco Entertainment, Modest Management, Warrior Poets and Fulwell 73
February 21, 2014	Pompeii	US distribution only; co-production with FilmDistrict, Constantin Film and Impact Pictures
April 16, 2014	Heaven Is for Real	co-production with Roth Films
May 9, 2014	Moms' Night Out	co-production with Affirm Films and Provident Films
August 22, 2014	When the Game Stands Tall	co-production with Affirm Films and Mandalay Pictures
August 7, 2015	Ricki and the Flash	co-production with LStar Capital, Marc Platt Productions and Badwill Entertainment
August 28, 2015	War Room	co-production with FaithStep Films, Provident Films, Affirm Films and Kendrick Brothers Productions
September 30, 2015	The Walk	co-production with LStar Capital and ImageMovers
December 4, 2015	The Lady in the Van	international distribution only; co-production with BBC Films
May 13, 2016	Money Monster	co-production with LStar Capital, Smokehouse Pictures and The Allegiance Theater
November 11, 2016	Billy Lynn's Long Halftime Walk	distribution outside China only; co-production with Studio 8, LStar Capital, Film4 Productions, Bona Film Group, The Ink Factory and Marc Platt Productions
March 17, 2017	T2 Trainspotting	British film; distribution only; produced by Film4, Creative Scotland, Cloud Eight Films, DNA Films and Decibel Films
June 28, 2017	Baby Driver	co-production with MRC, Working Title Films and Big Talk Productions
December 29, 2017	All the Money in the World	North American, UK and Irish distribution only; co-production with Imperative Entertainment, Scott Free Productions and RedRum Films
November 22, 2019	A Beautiful Day in the Neighborhood	distribution outside China only; co-production with Tencent Pictures, Big Beach and Youree Henley Productions

== 2020s ==
Release date	Title	Notes
September 11, 2020	The Broken Hearts Gallery	co-distribution outside Canada with Stage 6 Films only; produced by No Trace Camping
November 20, 2020	The Last Vermeer	US distribution only; produced by Imperative Entertainment
November 25, 2020	Happiest Season	international distribution outside Canada, the UK and Ireland only; co-production with Temple Hill Entertainment and Entertainment One; distributed in the US by Hulu
September 16, 2022	The Woman King	distribution outside the UK and Ireland only; co-production with Entertainment One, JuVee Productions and Welle Entertainment
December 9, 2022	Matilda The Musical	UK and Irish distribution only; co-production with Working Title Films and The Roald Dahl Story Company; distributed worldwide by Netflix
December 23, 2022	Whitney Houston: I Wanna Dance with Somebody	co-production with Black Label Media, Compelling Pictures, Muse of Fire Productions, Primary Wave Entertainment and West Madison Entertainment
November 17, 2023	Thanksgiving	distribution outside Italy, Poland, Hungary, the Czech Republic, Romania, Bulgaria, Slovakia, Portugal, Israel and Scandinavia only; co-production with Spyglass Media Group, Dragonfly Entertainment and Electromagnetic Productions
January 12, 2024	The Book of Clarence	distribution outside China only; co-production with Legendary Pictures and Kilburn Lane
November 1, 2024	Here	US distribution only; produced by Miramax and ImageMovers
January 17, 2025	One of Them Days	co-production with MACRO, Hoorae Media and ColorCreative
September 26, 2025	Eleanor the Great	co-distribution with Sony Pictures Classics; co-production with Maven Screen Media, Dauphin Studio, These Pictures, Pinky Promise and Wayfarer Studios
May 29, 2026	The Breadwinner	co-production with NateLand and One Man Canoe
September 18, 2026	Resident Evil	associate credit only; co-distribution outside France, Germany, Austria and Switzerland with Columbia Pictures; produced by Constantin Film, Davis Films, Vertigo Entertainment and PlayStation Productions

== Upcoming ==
Release date	Title	Notes	Production status
March 19, 2027	The Nightingale	co-production with The Cantillon Company, Lewellen Pictures and Hello Sunshine	Filming

=== Undated films ===
Release date	Title	Notes	Production status
TBA	Abbi and the Eighth Wonder	co-production with 21 Laps Entertainment	In development
TBA	The Alchemist	co-production with Legendary Entertainment and Palmstar Media	In development
TBA	Barbarella		In development
TBA	Cartoon Cat		In development
TBA	District 10		In development
TBA	The Dress	co-production with Nine Two Six Productions and Blue Harp	In development
TBA	Five	co-production with Hyperobject Industries	In development
TBA	Guys and Dolls	co-production with John Goldwyn Productions	In development
TBA	The Last Human	co-production with Lord Miller Productions	In development
TBA	The Last Orbit	co-production with FlynnPictureCo.	In development
TBA	Man's Best Friend	co-production with Temple Hill Entertainment and Shoe’s Off Productions	In development
TBA	Nothing, Except Everything	co-production with Protozoa Pictures	In development
TBA	Thanksgiving 2	co-production with Spyglass Media Group, Dragonfly Entertainment and Electromagnetic Productions	Pre-production
TBA	The Toymaker's Secret		In development
TBA	Untitled Boy George biopic	co-production with Primary Wave, Welle Entertainment and Roxwell Films	In development
TBA	Untitled Dean Fleischer Camp film	co-production with Present Company	In development
TBA	Untitled Labyrinth sequel	co-production with The Jim Henson Company and Maiden Voyage Pictures	In development
TBA	Untitled Troop Beverly Hills sequel		In development
TBA	Untitled Whac-A-Mole film	co-production with Mattel Studios	In development
TBA	The Wedding People	co-production with Speck + Gordon Inc. and Concordia Studio	In development
TBA	You're Dead Helene	co-production with Ghost House Pictures and Playbox Pictures	In development
