= Phoenix Pictures =

American film production company founded in November 1995

- Industry: Film
- Founded: November 1995; 30 years ago in Culver City, California
- Founders: Mike Medavoy; Arnold Messer
- Headquarters: Los Angeles, California, United States
- Website: phoenixpictures.com

Phoenix Pictures is an American independent film production company founded in November 1995 that has produced films since the mid to late 1990s with features including The People vs. Larry Flynt (1996), The Thin Red Line (1998), Zodiac (2007), Black Swan (2010), and Shutter Island (2010).

== History ==
Producers Mike Medavoy and Arnold Messer founded Phoenix Pictures in November 1995 as an independent production company. They acquired financing from Onex Corporation, Pearson Television, and Sony Pictures Entertainment. It struck a deal with CBS to air its movies on network television. Its business model was based on packaging films to present to studios and to then navigate the films' development.

In 1996, the studio struck an exclusive deal with Showtime Networks to air its networks on pay television.

Variety said Phoenix Pictures was one of the few companies to produce more than 25 films with the same executive team in place.

== Films ==
The films that are produced by Phoenix.

=== 1990s ===
Release date	Title	Notes	Budget	Gross (worldwide)
November 15, 1996	The Mirror Has Two Faces	co-production with Arnon Milchan Productions, Barwood Films and TriStar Pictures	$42 million	$91.6 million
December 25, 1996	The People vs. Larry Flynt	co-production with Ixtlan Productions and Columbia Pictures	$35 million	$20.3 million
October 3, 1997	U Turn	co-production with Illusion Entertainment Group and Clyde Is Hungry Films; distributed by Sony Pictures Releasing under the TriStar Pictures label	$19 million	$6.6 million
January 23, 1998	Swept from the Sea	co-production with Tapson Steel Films; distributed by Sony Pictures Releasing under the TriStar Pictures label	N/A	$283,081
September 25, 1998	Urban Legend	co-production with Original Film; distributed by Sony Pictures Releasing under the TriStar Pictures label	$14 million	$72.5 million
October 23, 1998	Apt Pupil	co-production with Bad Hat Harry Productions; distributed by Sony Pictures Releasing under the TriStar Pictures label	$14 million	$8.9 million
December 25, 1998	The Thin Red Line	co-production with Fox 2000 Pictures and Geisler-Roberdeau Productions; distributed by 20th Century Fox	$52 million	$98.1 million
July 16, 1999	Lake Placid	co-production with Rocking Chair Productions and Fox 2000 Pictures; distributed by 20th Century Fox	$27–35 million	$56.9 million
August 4, 1999	Dick	co-production with Pacific Western Productions; distributed by Sony Pictures Releasing under the Columbia Pictures label	$13 million	$6.3 million

=== 2000s ===
Release date	Title	Notes	Budget	Gross (worldwide)
March 31, 2000	Whatever It Takes	distributed by Sony Pictures Releasing under the Columbia Pictures label	$32 million	$9 million
August 4, 2000	Mad About Mambo	co-production with USA Films	N/A	$65,283
September 22, 2000	Urban Legends: Final Cut	co-production with Original Film; distributed by Sony Pictures Releasing under the Columbia Pictures label	$14 million	$38.6 million
November 17, 2000	The 6th Day	distributed by Sony Pictures Releasing under the Columbia Pictures label	$82 million	$96.1 million
March 28, 2003	Basic	co-production with Intermedia Films and Columbia Pictures	$50 million	$42.8 million
April 18, 2003	Holes	co-production with Walt Disney Pictures, Walden Media and Chicago Pacific Entertainment; distributed by Buena Vista Pictures Distribution	$20 million	$71.4 million
March 11, 2004	In My Country	co-production with The Film Consortium, Merlin Films, UK Film Council, Industrial Development Corporation, South Africa Limited, Inside Track Productions and Robert Chartoff Productions; distributed by Sony Pictures Classics	$12 million	$1.49 million
July 29, 2005	Stealth	co-production with Columbia Pictures, Original Film and Laura Ziskin Productions	$135 million	$76.9 million
September 22, 2006	All the King's Men	co-production with Columbia Pictures and Relativity Media	$55 million	$9.5 million
March 2, 2007	Zodiac	co-production with Paramount Pictures and Warner Bros. Pictures	$65 million	$84.8 million
March 9, 2007	Miss Potter	co-production with the UK Film Council, BBC Films, Grosvenor Park Media and Isle of Man Film; distributed by Metro-Goldwyn-Mayer and The Weinstein Company	$30 million	$35.9 million
April 13, 2007	Pathfinder	co-production with 20th Century Fox	$45 million	$30.8 million
July 3, 2007	License to Wed	co-production with Warner Bros. Pictures, Village Roadshow Pictures, Robert Simonds Productions, Underground Films and Management and Proposal Productions	$35 million	$70.2 million
August 24, 2007	Resurrecting the Champ	co-production with Alberta Film Entertainment, Battleplan Productions and Yari Film Group	$13 million	$3.2 million

=== 2010s ===
Release date	Title	Notes	Budget	Gross (worldwide)
February 19, 2010	Shutter Island	co-production with Sikelia Productions, Appian Way Productions and Paramount Pictures	$80 million	$294.8 million
December 3, 2010	Black Swan	co-production with Cross Creek Pictures, Protozoa Pictures, Dune Entertainment and Fox Searchlight Pictures	$13 million	$330.4 million
May 18, 2012	What to Expect When You're Expecting	co-production with Alcon Entertainment and Lionsgate	$40 million	$84.4 million
October 2, 2015	Shanghai	co-production with Barry Mendel Productions and The Weinstein Company	$50 million	$9.2 million
November 13, 2015	The 33	co-production with Alcon Entertainment; distributed by Warner Bros. Pictures	$26 million	$24.9 million
May 12, 2017	Absolutely Anything	uncredited; co-production with Bill & Ben Productions, GFM Films and Premiere Pictures; distributed by Atlas Distribution Company	N/A	$3.8 million

=== 2020s ===
Release date	Title	Notes	Budget	Gross (worldwide)
August 11, 2023	The Last Voyage of the Demeter	co-production with New Republic Pictures, Latina Pictures and DreamWorks Pictures; distributed by Universal Pictures	$45 million	$21.8 million
July 23, 2026	I, Object	co-production with Southern Light Films and Scythia Films; distributed by Umbrella Entertainment		

== Television ==
=== Television series/miniseries ===
Start date	End date	Title	Network	Notes	Seasons	Episodes
November 7, 1999	November 10, 1999	Shake, Rattle and Roll: An American Love Story	CBS	miniseries; co-production with Morling Manor Music & Media and CBS Productions	1	2
March 12, 2001	March 25, 2004	The Chris Isaak Show	Showtime	co-production with C.I. Productions, Once and Future Films, Viacom Productions and Showtime Networks	3	47
November 7, 2017	December 19, 2017	The Long Road Home	National Geographic	miniseries; co-production with Finngate Television and Fuzzy Door Productions	1	8
February 2, 2018	February 27, 2020	Altered Carbon	Netflix	co-production with Virago Productions, Mythology Entertainment and Skydance Television	2	18

=== Television movies ===
Release date	Title	Network	Notes
October 21, 2001	In the Time of the Butterflies	Showtime	uncredited; co-production with MGM Television and Ventanarosa
December 16, 2001	Off Season	Showtime	co-production with Palm Avenue Pictures and Hallmark Entertainment
November 10, 2002	The Outsider	Showtime	co-production with Coote Hayes Productions, DEJ Productions and Hallmark Entertainment
