= Cross Creek Pictures =

American film production company

Cross Creek Pictures LLC
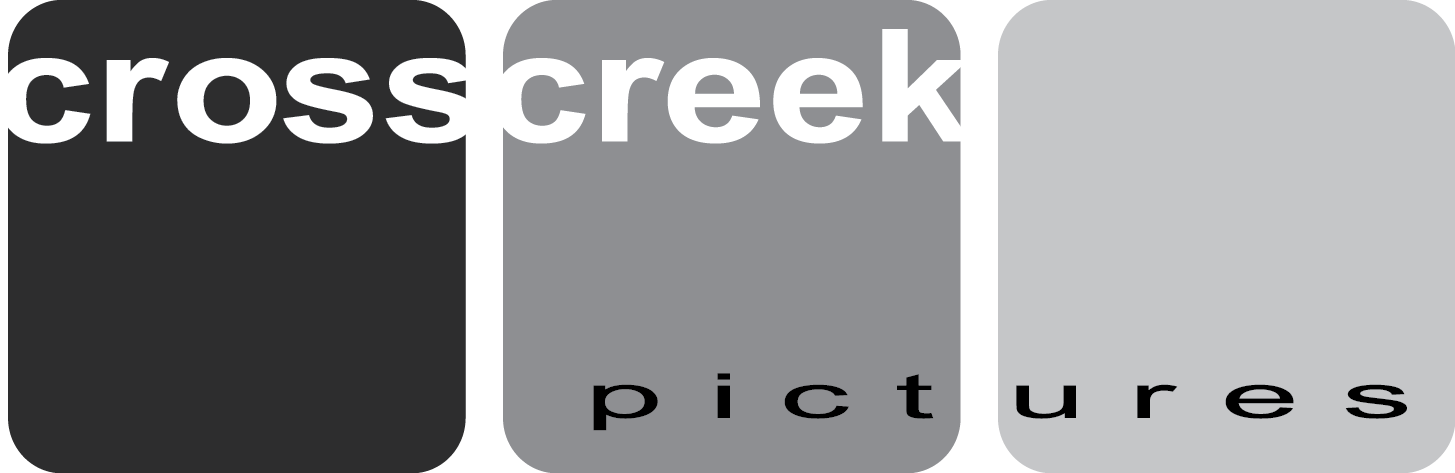
- Type: Private
- Industry: Film
- Founded: 2009
- Founder: Timmy Thompson; Tyler Thompson
- Headquarters: Los Angeles, California
- Products: Motion pictures
- Website: crosscreekpictures.com

Cross Creek Pictures is an American film production company founded in 2009 by Timmy Thompson and Tyler Thompson. Brian Oliver served as president of the company from 2009 to 2017. Its first production was Black Swan (2010), followed by The Ides of March (2011), The Woman in Black (2012) and Rush (2013).

In September 2011, Cross Creek signed a deal with Universal Pictures, where the studio would release at least six productions for the company over the following three years. In November 2015, Cross Creek signed a new three-year, multifaceted co-financing, production and distribution deal with Sony Pictures.

== Films ==
This is the list of films produced or financed by Cross Creek.

Released films
Year	Film	Director	Distributor	Notes	Budget	Gross	RT
2010	Black Swan	Darren Aronofsky	Fox Searchlight Pictures	co-production with Protozoa Pictures, Phoenix Pictures and Dune Entertainment	$13 million	$330.2 million	85%
2011	The Ides of March	George Clooney	Columbia Pictures (through Sony Pictures Releasing)	co-production with Smokehouse Pictures, Appian Way Productions and Exclusive Media	$12.5 million	$76.3 million	84%
2012	The Woman in Black	James Watkins	CBS Films	co-production with Alliance Films, Hammer Films, UK Film Council, Talisman Films, Exclusive Media, Filmgate and Film i Väst	$15-17 million	$129 million	66%
2012	Arthur Newman	Dante Ariola	Cinedigm Entertainment	co-production with Vertebra Films	—N/a	$747,140	18%
2012	Aftershock	Nicolás López	Dimension Films/RADiUS-TWC	co-production with Dragonfly Entertainment	$2 million	$294,696	42%
2013	Rush	Ron Howard	Universal Pictures	co-production with Exclusive Media, Working Title Films, Imagine Entertainment and Revolution Films	$38 million	$93.3 million	89%
2013	The Young and Prodigious T.S. Spivet	Jean-Pierre Jeunet	Gaumont	co-production with Epithète Films, Filmarto, France 2 Cinéma, Orange Cinéma Séries and Tapioca Films	€26.8 million	$9.5 million	78%
2014	A Walk Among the Tombstones	Scott Frank	Universal Pictures	co-production with Endgame Entertainment, 1984 Private Defense Contractors, Exclusive Media, Jersey Films and Double Feature Films	$28 million	$58.8 million	68%
2014	Clown	Jon Watts	Dimension Films	co-production with PS 260, Vertebra Films, Zed Filmworks, Method Studios and Dragonfly Entertainment	$1.5 million	$4.4 million	46%
2015	Everest	Baltasar Kormákur	Universal Pictures	co-production with Walden Media and Working Title Films	$55 million	$203.4 million	73%
2015	Black Mass	Scott Cooper	Warner Bros. Pictures	co-production with RatPac Entertainment, Le Grisbi Productions, Head Gear Films and Vendian Entertainment	$53 million	$100 million	74%
2015	Legend	Brian Helgeland	Universal Pictures	North American distribution only; co-production with StudioCanal, Anton Capital Entertainment, Amazon Prime Instant Video and Working Title Films	$20 million	$43 million	60%
2016	Pride and Prejudice and Zombies	Burr Steers	Screen Gems (through Sony Pictures Releasing)	co-production with Sierra Pictures, MadRiver Pictures, QC Entertainment, Allison Shearmur Productions, Handsomecharlie Films and Head Gear Films	$28 million	$16.5 million	47%
2016	Hacksaw Ridge	Mel Gibson	Lionsgate	co-production with Summit Entertainment, Demarest Media, Pandemonium Films, Permut Presentations and Vendian Entertainment	$40 million	$180.6 million	84%
2017	American Made	Doug Liman	Universal Pictures	co-production with Imagine Entertainment, Quadrant Pictures and Vendian Entertainment	$50 million	$134.9 million	85%
2017	Flatliners	Niels Arden Oplev	Sony Pictures Releasing	co-production with Columbia Pictures, Further Films, Laurence Mark Productions and The Safran Company	$19 million	$45.2 million	4%
2017	Roman J. Israel, Esq.	Dan Gilroy	Sony Pictures Releasing	co-production with Columbia Pictures, MACRO, Topic Studios, Bron Studios, The Culture China/Image Nation Abu Dhabi Content Fund and Escape Artists	$22 million	$13 million	55%
2018	The Vanishing	Kristoffer Nyholm	Lionsgate	co-production with Mad As Birds, Kodiak Pictures, G-BASE, iWood Studios	$5 million	$1.2 million	84%
2020	Bloodshot	David S.F. Wilson	Sony Pictures Releasing	co-production with Columbia Pictures, Bona Film Group, Original Film, Valiant Entertainment and One Race Films	$49 million	$39.9 million	32%
2020	The Tax Collector	David Ayer	RLJE Films	co-production with Cedar Park Entertainment	$4 million	$1.3 million	17%
2020	The Trial of the Chicago 7	Aaron Sorkin	Netflix	co-production with Paramount Pictures, DreamWorks Pictures and Marc Platt Productions	$35 million	$116,473	89%
2022	The Pale Blue Eye	Scott Cooper	Netflix	co-production with Streamline Global Group	$72 million	—N/a	62%
