= Tencent Pictures =

Chinese film production company

- Native name: 腾讯影业
- Type: Division
- Industry: Film
- Founded: 2015; 11 years ago
- Headquarters: Shanghai, China; Hong Kong
- Key people: Chen Yingjie
- Parent: Tencent Interactive Entertainment Group
- Subsidiaries: Tencent Penguin Pictures

Tencent Pictures (simplified Chinese: 腾讯影业; traditional Chinese: 騰訊影業; pinyin: téng xùn yǐng yè) is a Chinese film distributor and production company owned by Tencent. It has created films based on books, manhua, donghua and video games. In 2015, Tencent set up Tencent Penguin Pictures (Shanghai), a new movie production unit, focusing on online drama and minority investments in feature films.

== Filmography ==
Year	Film title	Director	Distributor	Gross (worldwide)	Gross (China)	Notes
2015	Roco Kingdom 4	Hughes Martel and Dongbiao Cao	Beijing Enlight Pictures	—N/a	CN¥77 million	
2016	Warcraft	Duncan Jones	Universal Pictures (Worldwide); Legendary East (China)	$433 million	$213 million	
2016	Rock Dog	Ash Brannon	Summit Premiere	$23 million	$24.1 million	Under Huayi Tencent Entertainment
2017	Kong: Skull Island	Jordan Vogt-Roberts	Warner Bros. Pictures (Worldwide); Legendary East (China)	$566 million	$168 million	
2017	Wonder Woman	Patty Jenkins	Warner Bros. Pictures	$821 million	$90 million	
2017	Our Shining Days	Wang Ran	Edko Films	—N/a	$9 million	
2018	Lost in Apocalypse	Sky Wang	Distribution Only	—N/a	CNY2 million	
2018	A First Farewell	Lina Wang	Distribution Only	—N/a	CN¥214 Million	
2018	Animal World	Han Yan	Beijing Enlight Pictures	$74 million	$74 million	
2018	L Storm	David Lam	Pegasus Motion Pictures	$64 million	$63 million	
2018	Shadow	Zhang Yimou	Well Go USA Entertainment	$91 million	$90 million	
2018	Venom	Ruben Fleischer	Sony Pictures Entertainment (through Columbia Pictures)	$855 million	$272 million	
2018	Bumblebee	Travis Knight	Paramount Pictures	$467 million	$170 million	
2019	Men in Black: International	F. Gary Gray	Sony Pictures Entertainment (through Columbia Pictures)	$253 million	$44 million	
2019	Shanghai Fortress	Teng Huatao	China Film Group Corporation	—N/a	$16 million	
2019	Terminator: Dark Fate	Tim Miller	Paramount Pictures (North America); Walt Disney Studios Motion Pictures (International; through 20th Century Fox)	$261 million	$50 million	
2019	A Beautiful Day in the Neighborhood	Marielle Heller	Sony Pictures Entertainment (through TriStar Pictures)	$67 million	$212,000	
2020	The Eight Hundred	Guan Hu	CMC Pictures Holdings	$63 million	$460 million	
2020	Vanguard	Stanley Tong	Golden Screen Cinemas	$50 million	$50.6 million	
2020	Monster Hunter	Paul W. S. Anderson	Sony Pictures Entertainment (through Screen Gems)	$40 million	$5.3 million	
2020	The Rescue	Dante Lam	CMC Pictures Holdings	$63 million	$62 million	
2021	Wish Dragon	Chris Appelhans	Netflix (Worldwide); Sony Pictures Entertainment (China; through Sony Pictures Animation)	$25 million	$25.3 million	
2021	1921	Huang Jianxin and Zheng Dasheng	Huaxia Film Distribution	—N/a	$76 million	
2021	Raging Fire	Benny Chan	Emperor Motion Pictures	—N/a	$213.4 million	
2021	Extinct	David Silverman	Huayi Brothers (China); Netflix (Worldwide)	—N/a		Under Huayi Tencent Entertainment
2022	Moonfall	Roland Emmerich	Lionsgate Films	$58.9 million	—N/a	Under Huayi Tencent Entertainment
2023	Creation of the Gods I: Kingdom of Storms	Wuershan	Huaxia Film Distribution	$110 million	$373 million	

=== Undated films ===
- New York Will Eat You Alive
- Crossfire
- 20,000 Miles Plan
- Aura
- Crazy Alien
- Dark Side of the Moon
- The Game of Antiques
- Koseison
- The Magic Blade remake
- Pathfinder
- The Treasure Map
- The Tuzki 3D
- Valorant (Video game adaptation)
