= List of Diary of a Wimpy Kid characters =

The Diary of a Wimpy Kid franchise features a wide range of characters, primarily focusing on protagonist Greg Heffley, a middle school student navigating the challenges of adolescence. The series also highlights his best friend Rowley Jefferson and Greg's family, which includes his mother Susan, father Frank, and brothers Rodrick and Manny.

== Main characters ==
=== Greg Heffley ===
Gregory "Greg" Heffley is the protagonist of the Diary of a Wimpy Kid series. He is the middle son of Frank and Susan Heffley. Throughout middle school, Greg mainly wants to be popular. This often leads him to act against others or manipulate his best friend, Rowley. His desire for popularity creates conflict. For example, in Diary of an Awesome Friendly Kid, he deliberately disrupts Rowley's schoolwork. Despite this, he sometimes shows kindness, revealing a more complicated personality. In the film adaptations, Greg is played in live-action by Zachary Gordon, and Jason Drucker, with Brady Noon, Wesley Kimmel, and Aaron D. Harris providing his voice in animation.

=== Rowley Jefferson ===
Rowley Jefferson is Greg's kind-hearted and naive best friend who stays loyal even though he often gets caught up in Greg’s plans. Their friendship hits a big bump in Diary of a Wimpy Kid: The Third Wheel and Diary of a Wimpy Kid: Hard Luck when Rowley starts dating Abigail Brown. They manage to make up after the breakup. Greg often teases Rowley about his "childish" interests, like his love for the singer Joshie and his comic strip Zoo Wee Mama!, where Rowley has to stand up for his own creative role. Rowley eventually becomes the main character in Diary of an Awesome Friendly Kid, which looks at their friendship through his eyes. In the film adaptations, he is played by Robert Capron, and Owen Asztalos in live-action, with Ethan William Childress, with Spencer Howell providing his voice in the animated films.

=== Frank Heffley ===
Franklin "Frank" Heffley is Greg's overreactive but well-meaning father. He is a U.S. history enthusiast, who often works on a replica Civil War battlefield which is an ongoing plot element. Frank usually disapproves of Greg's interests, like video games, and loathes heavy metal and adolescent behavior. To "toughen up" Greg, he threatens to send him to a military academy in The Last Straw, though the two occasionally find common ground in later books like Dog Days. Frank also shares some of Greg's flaws; he has a hidden junk food addiction and in Old School, it is revealed that he invented the Silas Scratch legend to keep others away from a private bathroom. He is portrayed in the film adaptations by Steve Zahn, Tom Everett Scott, and Chris Diamantopoulos.

=== Susan Heffley ===
Susan Heffley (known as Ann Heffley in the online version), is Greg’s mother and a homemaker. She has been with Frank since middle school. While she is loving and good-natured, she often comes across as overprotective, embarrassing, and naive about her teenage sons' interests. Susan frequently pushes for family bonding activities that don't work out. She and Frank are often criticized for showing obvious favoritism toward their youngest son, Manny. In the 2011 film version of Rodrick Rules, she writes a local newspaper column called Susan's Musings. In the film series, she is portrayed by Rachael Harris, Alicia Silverstone, and Erica Cerra.

=== Rodrick Heffley ===
Rodrick Heffley is Greg’s older brother and a member of the heavy metal band Löded Diper. While he and Greg often get into trouble together, their relationship slowly improves throughout the series. Rodrick is described as uninterested in school and prone to silly mistakes, such as his inability to type or his confusion over basic historical facts. Frank does not trust Rodrick because of his lifestyle and music choices. However, the Dog Days film shows a rare moment of family support when the band performs for Rodrick's crush, Heather Hills. In the films, he is played by Devon Bostick and Charlie Wright in live-action, while Hunter Dillon voices him in the animated versions. In the live-action films, his bedroom is moved to the attic as the house used for filming did not have a basement.

=== Manny Heffley ===
Man "Manny" Heffley is Greg and Rodrick's three-year-old brother (five in the Funbrain version and the first book). As the youngest child, he is consistently pampered by his parents, who often allow him to get away with behaviour that Greg is punished for, such as drawing on bedroom doors. Despite being so young, Manny often shows surprising intelligence and resourcefulness. Notable examples include him speaking fluent Spanish in The Long Haul and cutting the family’s power to everything except his own room during a blizzard in Cabin Fever. A constant source of annoyance for Greg is Manny's habit of calling him "Bubby." This is a funny mispronunciation of "brother" from when Manny was younger. Manny has appeared in every book in the series so far and is sometimes seen with a pet piglet he won at a fair. In the live-action films, he is portrayed by Connor and Owen Fielding, as well as Wyatt and Dylan Walters, while Gracen Newton provides his voice in the animated reboots.

== Greg's extended family ==
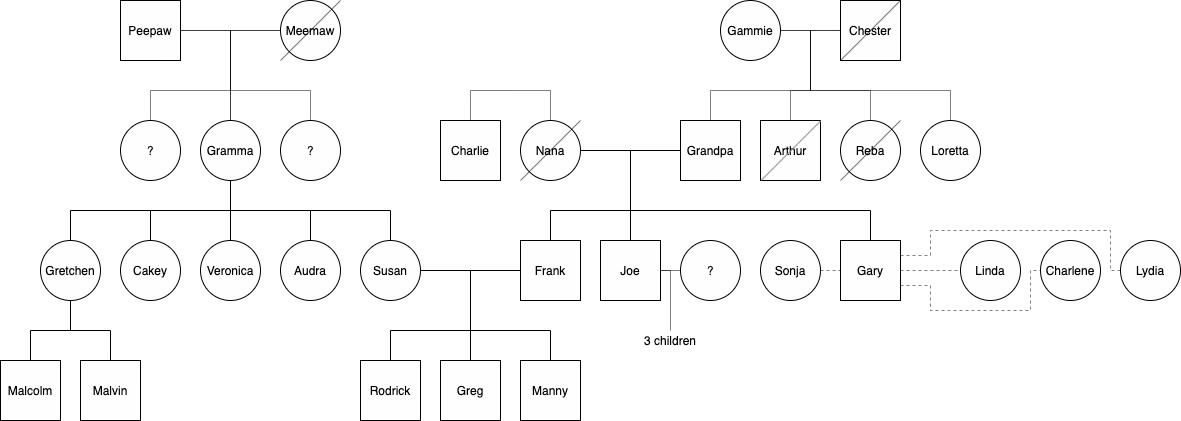
Greg's extended family tree

=== Gramma ===
"Gramma" is Susan's mother and Greg's maternal grandmother. She is known to favour Manny, despite her denials, and has a passion for bingo and knitting. Gramma is the current owner of Sweetie following the Heffleys' giving him up. In Hot Mess, she organizes a beach trip for her 75th birthday, which ends with the Heffley family returning home to find she threw a party without them.

=== Grandpa ===
"Grandpa" Heffley is Greg's paternal grandfather who enjoys playing games like Rummy and watching CCTV footage of his former retirement home, Leisure Towers. He openly favours Greg but is infamous for his "watercress salad," a dish Greg hides in his pockets to avoid eating. Grandpa has a strained relationship with Frank, often criticizing him or even sharing unpleasant stories from Frank's childhood. In the live-action films, he is played by Terrence Kelly, while Ed Asner voices him in the 2022 animated film.

=== Joe Heffley ===
Joseph "Joe" Heffley is Frank's brother. The two share a sibling rivalry dating back to when Joe told Manny about a "potty monster," which delayed Manny's potty training for years. Joe's children refer to Frank as "Aunt Fwank," a joke that Susan finds cute but Frank finds irritating.

=== Joe Heffley's children ===
Joe Heffley has three children who are slightly older than Manny, and they are known for calling their uncle Frank "Aunt Fwank," which Frank believes is a prank encouraged by their father.

=== Uncle Charlie ===
Charles "Charlie" is Grandpa's brother-in-law and Greg's great-uncle. Greg views him as a "secret weapon" for obtaining forbidden Christmas gifts, though this often fails when Charlie buys the wrong items, such as buying a Beach Fun Barbie instead of a Barbie Dream House intended to be used as a toy fort or an 8 x 10 picture of himself instead of a Twisted Wizard video game. A bachelor with a lot of spare money, Charlie eventually gives Greg a laundry hoop for Christmas to hint that he is tired of the arrangement.

=== Loretta Heffley ===
Loretta Heffley is Greg's great-aunt and Grandpa's sister. She mostly appears during family gatherings like Thanksgiving. Greg and Rodrick generally dislike her visits and often argue over who has to be the one to greet her first.

=== Gammie Heffley ===
"Gammie" Heffley is Greg's 95-year-old great-grandmother and the matriarch of the Heffley family. Gammie is a bit of a trickster; she once used a losing scratch ticket to trick the entire family into visiting her for a roast dinner.

=== Gary Heffley ===
Garrett "Gary" Heffley is Frank’s youngest brother, known for having four failed marriages and being financially unstable. He briefly lives with Greg's family in The Third Wheel after a failed business venture, but eventually moves out after winning $40,000 on a scratch ticket. Frank often disapproves of Gary's immaturity and his habit of dating women who quickly divorce him.

=== Aunt Dorothy ===
Dorothy Heffley is Greg's aunt who is best known for kissing him on the lips, a habit he finds so unpleasant that he secretly wipes his face on curtains. She is also described as being overweight and occasionally farting loudly in public.

=== Arthur Heffley ===
Arthur Heffley (named Clyde Heffley in the online version) was a great-uncle who communicated almost entirely through grunts and random sounds. He shared a birthday with Greg and passed away in Partypooper.

=== Benjy Heffley ===
Benjamin "Benjy" Heffley is Greg's cousin who has recently learned to speak in full sentences and read chapter books, though he still wears diapers. He notably took Greg's place as a reader at Uncle Gary's fourth wedding to Sonja.

=== Terrence Heffley ===
Terrence "Terry" Heffley is a second cousin of Frank who looked exactly like Greg when he was younger. After seeing photos of Terrence in an album, Greg begins saving money for future plastic surgery to avoid ending up with the same adult appearance.

=== Lawrence Heffley ===
Lawrence Heffley is an uncle who is rarely seen in person because he is always traveling for work. Because he misses most family gatherings, he usually participates by calling the family on a webcam.

=== Aunt Audra ===
Audra is one of Susan’s sisters who believes in crystal balls and spends a lot of money on fortune tellers. In Hard Luck, a fortune teller gives her a cryptic clue that eventually helps the family find Meemaw’s lost diamond ring.

=== Aunt Veronica ===
Veronica is Greg's aunt and Susan's sister who stays away from the family due to stress, preferring to communicate via video chat. She owns a famous social media dog named Dazzle and once accidentally started a video call with Greg while he was in the bathroom.

=== Aunt Gretchen ===
Gretchen is Susan’s youngest sister and the mother of out-of-control twins, Malvin and Malcolm. She is known for owning dozens of pets, including a rabbit that caused a lot of frustration for Frank during a family trip.

=== Malvin and Malcolm ===
Malvin and Malcolm are Greg's cousins who were once kept on child leashes because they are so difficult to manage. They are known for chaotic behavior, such as calling the police to report a lack of ketchup or accidentally injuring themselves while playing with concrete.

=== Aunt Cakey ===
Cakey is Susan’s oldest sister who dislikes children and once lived with the Heffleys, during which Greg accidentally gave himself a second-degree burn with an iron. It is later revealed she briefly dated Frank before he married Susan.

=== Gerald ===
Gerald is a cousin from California who lived with the Heffleys shortly after Greg was born. He frequently reminds Greg of this time, much to Greg's embarrassment during family events.

=== Martina ===
Martina is Susan's cousin who became wealthy after winning a lawsuit against a Las Vegas hotel. She broke her collarbone after mistaking a mirror for an open room and running straight into it at a breakfast buffet.

=== Uncle Larry ===
Lawrence "Larry" is a family friend who is treated like an uncle despite not being related to anyone. Greg generally likes him but is annoyed that he always takes Gramma’s best chair during his annual visits.

=== Gramma's sisters ===
Gramma has two sisters who have a mutual dislike for each other. They famously exchange insulting gifts during the holidays, such as used bars of deodorant or old ketchup packets.

=== Cecil ===
Cecil is Greg’s four-year-old uncle who was adopted by Great Aunt Marcie. Greg feels awkward around him because Cecil is given adult privileges at family gatherings despite his very young age.

=== Georgia ===
Georgia is a second cousin who has a loose tooth that has stayed in her mouth for years. She is known for stalling and avoiding anyone who offers to help her pull it out.

=== Aunt Reba ===
Great Aunt Reba was Grandpa’s sister who was famously left off the guest list for Gammie's Christmas party. After her death in Wrecking Ball, she left the Heffleys an inheritance that Susan used to renovate their house.

=== Meemaw and Peepaw ===
"Meemaw" and "Peepaw" are the maternal great-grandparents of the Heffley children. Meemaw is remembered for hiding a valuable diamond ring in an Easter egg before she died, while Peepaw is depicted as being senile. Meemaw appears in the 2017 The Long Haul film adaptation played by Mimi Gould.

=== Aunt Lou ===
Great Aunt Lou is a great-aunt who unsuccessfully tried to create a special meatball recipe to compete with the one Gramma makes for the family.

== Rowley's family ==
Rowley Jefferson's parents, Robert and Linda, are portrayed as caring but very protective, often acting as a counterbalance to Greg Heffley’s reckless influence. Robert is a defensive father who tries to shield his son from violent media and Greg's schemes, frequently standing in the way of the boys' friendship. Linda's protective nature is evident when she hides healthy ingredients in junk food and makes Greg apologize for injuries he inflicts on Rowley. Linda, however, is usually more tolerant of Greg, even though she ultimately supports her husband's rule against him visiting their home. In the film adaptations, Robert is primarily portrayed by Alfred E. Humphreys, and Randy Pearlstein, with Kaye Capron and Bronwen Smith portraying Linda.

The extended Jefferson family highlights the difference between Rowley's sheltered upbringing and Greg's cynical view of the world. Rowley's grandfather, affectionately known as "Bampy," serves mainly as a comedic element to showcase Greg's social awkwardness, especially when Greg makes an inappropriate remark about his grandfather's mortality during a birthday party. The Jefferson family is used throughout the series to showcases Rowley's innocence and overbearing parental environment that shaped his naive personality, creating a sharp narrative contrast with the more chaotic Heffley household.

== Greg's peers ==
Greg's classmates mainly reflect his continuing attempts to become popular and maneuver on the middle school social ladder. The top of this hierarchy is occupied by students such as Bryce Anderson, who is effortlessly popular with girls, and Holly Hills, whose romantic infatuations with Greg continue for several books. Holly's older sister, Heather Hills, serves a similar function as a teenage love interest for Greg's older brother, Rodrick. On the flip side, Greg constantly antagonizes classmates who make his school experience miserable. His difficult relationship with demanding, aggressive student Patty Farrell is only one example of his misfortunes. Similarly, Greg's friendship with his classmate Rowley is temporarily destroyed by the jealousy of Greg's girlfriend and Rowley's girlfriend, Abigail Brown.

A large part of the series centres on the bizarre and unpredictable children Greg tries desperately to avoid, with Fregley being the most prominent of these. He is a highly eccentric neighbour with no sense of personal boundaries who becomes uncontrollably frenetic when exposed to sugar. Albert Sandy is known to be a boy who spreads totally illogical and absurd rumours, and Ruby Bird, a girl notorious for biting people when she gets upset. The books also describe even more extreme outcasts, like the feral Mingo kids who live in the woods and attack anyone who comes near their camp, or Evelyn Trimble, who genuinely believes she is a vampire. These characters basically exist to make Greg's daily life as uncomfortable and chaotic as possible.

The rest of Greg's peers mainly serve to support specific jokes or school events. For example, Darren Walsh and Abe Hall are known for starting the infamous "Cheese Touch" game that drives the plot of the first book. Chirag Gupta is a kind kid who becomes the target of a huge school prank where everyone pretends he is invisible. Others, like Collin Lee, act as temporary plot devices, with Collin briefly stepping in as Rowley's best friend. There are also familiar faces like the Snellas, a family with many boys whose half-birthday parties Greg hates, adding to the frustrating environment Greg has to deal with.

== Other characters ==
The series features various teenagers and adults who create challenges for Greg and his family. For example, Bill Walter is a 35-year-old unemployed musician that Rodrick admires, which frustrates Frank. Bill serves as a cautionary tale of what Rodrick might become if he doesn't pay attention to his future. Greg also frequently encounters aggressive bullies like Pete Hosey, a hostile teen who harasses him on Halloween, and vacation nuisances like the Beardos, a loud family that consistently wrecks the Heffleys' road trip in The Long Haul. Even younger kids act as antagonists, such as Taylor Pringle, a highly aggressive little girl who goes out of her way to embarrass and physically attack Greg in the live-action films.

At school and in the neighborhood, authority figures and rival families increase the pressure Greg and his dad experience. Frank Heffley is deeply insecure about the Warrens, a highly athletic and successful family that constantly makes Frank want to force Greg into being more masculine. At school, Greg faces tired, cynical staff members, including his resentful history teacher, Mr. Huff, and the school's corrupt founder, Larry Mack Sr., who secretly stole school funds to open car dealerships. Meanwhile, characters like Lenwood Heath—a former teen delinquent who turns his life around after being sent to a strict military academy—are often used by Frank as a threat to send Greg away whenever he misbehaves.

The books also make fun of the media, internet culture, and folklore that middle schoolers love. A big recurring joke is Rowley's blind loyalty to Joshie, a European pop singer clearly aimed at young kids and girls. On the other hand, Rodrick is obsessed with the aging and dysfunctional members of the heavy metal band Metallichihuahua, whose failed careers, petty rivalries, and legal issues are heavily discussed in Diper Överlöde. The series explores internet fame through characters like Mac Digby, a parody of loud YouTube gamers, and delves into childhood superstitions with Silas Scratch, a made-up campfire legend created by Frank years ago to keep other campers away from a comfy maintenance shed.

Finally, the Heffleys' town has many one-note characters and neighbourhood extras who exist to make Greg's life a bit more awkward. This includes kids like Scotty Douglas, a silly first-grader who looks just like Greg's awful comic strip drawings, or classmates defined by a single embarrassing incident, like Cody "Dookie" Johnson. From grumpy neighbours who refuse to pay for yard work to random background names like the extremely competitive Woodley brothers, these minor characters add to the chaotic, slightly absurd world of Greg's hometown. They usually appear just long enough to deliver a quick joke or accidentally foil one of Greg's selfish plans.

== Pets ==
The various pets in the series often highlight the Heffley family's dysfunction or serve as jokes in ongoing gags. For instance, Sweetie is a dog that Frank buys because he feels guilty about his childhood pet Nutty. However, Sweetie’s demanding behavior and laziness eventually cause the family to give him to Gramma. Similarly, the pet pig that Manny wins adds a touch of absurdity to the later books, as it shows human-like intelligence that often frustrates Greg. Other animals, like the brothers' briefly owned fish or Aunt Veronica’s famous dog Dazzle on social media, highlight the differences between Greg and his siblings or poke fun at modern trends like influencer culture. These pets aren’t shown as typical companions, and they primarily act as sources of chaos that disrupt the family’s daily life and expose the character flaws of the people around them.
