= Diary of a Wimpy Kid: The Long Haul (film) =

2017 film by David Bowers

- Theatrical release poster
- Directed by: David Bowers
- Screenplay by: Jeff Kinney; David Bowers
- Based on: Diary of a Wimpy Kid: The Long Haul, Old School, Hard Luck and The Third Wheel by Jeff Kinney
- Produced by: Nina Jacobson; Brad Simpson
- Starring: Jason Drucker; Alicia Silverstone; Tom Everett Scott; Charlie Wright; Owen Asztalos
- Cinematography: Anthony B. Richmond
- Edited by: Troy Takaki
- Music by: Edward Shearmur
- Production companies: Fox 2000 Pictures; Color Force
- Distributed by: 20th Century Fox
- Release date: May 19, 2017
- Running time: 91 minutes
- Country: United States
- Language: English
- Budget: $22 million
- Box office: $40.1 million

Diary of a Wimpy Kid: The Long Haul is a 2017 American road comedy film written and directed by David Bowers. It is the fourth installment in the Diary of a Wimpy Kid film series, a standalone sequel to Diary of a Wimpy Kid: Dog Days, and the final live-action film in the franchise. It was based on the ninth book of the same name, with elements of the seventh, eighth, and tenth books in the series, and was cowritten by the author, Jeff Kinney. The plot follows the Heffleys as they go on a road trip to Meemaw's 90th birthday party, without realizing the various calamities that will occur along the way.

Dog Days, released in 2012, was described as the last live-action film in the franchise, with the original cast and crew indicating that there were no plans for a fourth one or any more sequels. By 2016, a live-action adaptation of the ninth book, The Long Haul, was in development, with a brand new cast portraying the Heffley family. It was released by 20th Century Fox on May 19, 2017. It received negative reviews from critics and grossed $40.1 million against a $22 million budget.

The film's failure resulted in two planned live-action sequels with the cast to be cancelled, and the franchise was rebooted in 2021 with an animated film based on the first book.

== Plot ==
The Heffley family dines at a restaurant called Corny's, where Susan announces the family plan for a road trip to attend Meemaw's 90th birthday party, much to Rodrick and Greg's dismay. Greg is then sent to rescue Manny from inside a tube in the play area but ends up in the ball pit with a diaper stuck to his hand much to his horror. Onlookers film Greg during his freakout, and he becomes famous when the footage is posted online as an embarrassing meme called "Diaper Hands". Later, he learns that the Player Expo is taking place not far from Meemaw's house in Indianapolis. His favorite Internet star, Mac Digby, will be attending so he plans to sneak off from the road trip and secretly go to the Player Expo and pose for a picture with him in an attempt to get the public to forget about Diaper Hands. As soon as they start, everyone's phones are immediately confiscated by Susan, so the road trip is "absolutely technology-free".

That night, at a motel, Greg secretly gets his phone from the car. While he and Rodrick are relaxing in a hot tub, Rodrick uncovers his plans to go to the Player Expo, but Greg convinces him not to tell Susan, and opts to go with him. Later that night, Greg investigates a loud noise: a couple of kids repeatedly slamming a wheeled cart into a wall, belonging to a family which he calls "the Beardos" due to their father's beard. Scolding them for making that racket, he threatens to have them thrown out. Their father comes out, and nearly gets hit by the cart his daughter rolls at Greg, but it misses him and damages their van. She blames Greg, telling her father that he also called him a "big fat Beardo", causing him to plot revenge.

On the road, Manny wins a piglet at a fair. Mr. Beardo, who is also there with his family, sees Greg and pursues him. The next day, a work call and the piglet's craziness lead to the Heffleys nearly crashing their car on a bridge, and they donate the piglet to a petting zoo while Greg reroutes the GPS to the Player Expo. In the hotel room, Rodrick and Greg leave a note telling Frank and Susan that they left to buy a gift for Meemaw, but they sneak out to Player Expo. Thinking they are missing, Susan calls the police but gets them herself after seeing them on TV.

Seeing Mac Digby in a video game competition, Greg asks Rodrick to record him on the stage behind him, but he accidentally knocks out the power to Mac's screen. Susan arrives and accidentally reveals to Mac that Greg is Diaper Hands, humiliating him in the process. She said that all she wanted was a nice road trip to bring them closer together, and accuses him of not caring. Fed up with her being so controlling, Greg calls her out on her hypocrisy and naivety, to which she relents, and gives him his cell phone back. Back on the road, the tarp on their motorboat blows open and their belongings fly out. The Beardos then show up and begin stealing them as "payback".

The Heffleys chase after the Beardos, but get stuck in a traffic jam, which they get out of by taking a back road. They come across the Beardos' van at another motel, steal their belongings back, and manage to reach Meemaw's birthday party with Greg in the boat, which detached from the car. It is then launched over the wall of Meemaw's house with him inside and lands in her swimming pool. After the party, the car is still broken, though a tow truck driver stops by, but he only speaks Spanish, though Manny is able to communicate due to a CD they heard earlier in the trip. He guides them to the petting zoo and he retrieves the piglet. In Greg's ending monologue, Frank gets time off from work to spend with his family, and Rodrick gets money to repair his van. While the trip was far hardly perfect, it was eventful and he's excited for next year. Susan steps in to say they will be flying.

== Cast ==
- Jason Drucker as Greg Heffley, Susan and Frank's son
- Alicia Silverstone as Susan Heffley, Greg's mother
- Tom Everett Scott as Frank Heffley, Greg's father
- Charlie Wright as Rodrick Heffley, Greg's older brother
- Owen Asztalos as Rowley Jefferson, Greg's best friend
- Dylan and Wyatt Walters as Manny Heffley, Greg's younger brother
- Joshua Hoover as Mac Digby
- Christopher A. Coppola as Mr. Beardo
- Kimberli Lincoln as Mrs. Beardo
- Mira Silverman as Brandi Beardo
- Mimi Gould as Meemaw
- Nathaniel Dickson as Brandon Beardo
- Jake Strerner as Brent Beardo

The series' author, Jeff Kinney, makes his third cameo role, this time as a booth owner at the Player Expo. Kinney had previously portrayed Mr. Hills in Rodrick Rules and Dog Days.

== Production ==
In 2012, the series' third entry, Diary of a Wimpy Kid: Dog Days was described as the last live action film in the franchise. That same year in August, while doing press for the film, author Jeff Kinney and actors Zachary Gordon and Robert Capron, who portrayed Greg and Rowley in the previous installments, each indicated that there were no plans for more movies, but did not dismiss the possibility entirely.

In 2014, Jeff Kinney replied to inquiries regarding the possibility of more sequels in a YouTube video, stating, "At present, we don't have a fourth film in development, but you never know!" When describing the likelihood of starring in another film in the series, Gordon explained, "Dog Days most likely will be the last movie. The main problem is [the cast] is getting older. You can't stop it. There's no way to temporarily stop us from changing and growing up. You know, that's the problem because the characters are supposed to be timeless."

In March 2013, Gordon stated in a Spreecast live stream that there would not be any more live action films. Previously, Kinney had indicated that instead of making a live action film, he would like to see Diary of a Wimpy Kid: Cabin Fever adapted into an animated film, stating in an interview, "I hope that it gets made into an animated movie. But I'd really like to see it turn into an animated television special." The film Diary of a Wimpy Kid Christmas: Cabin Fever, an animated adaptation of Cabin Fever, would later release on Disney+ in 2023.

In 2016, it was announced that a live-action film adaptation of the ninth book The Long Haul was in development, and would be featuring a completely new cast playing the Heffleys.

Lucas Cruikshank, best known for creating the YouTube series Fred, originally auditioned for the role of Mac Digby. However, he did not read the script and had no idea of the role he was auditioning for outside of the fact that it was a YouTube role. Coincidentally, Cruikshank previously auditioned for the role of Greg Heffley in the first film.

== Release ==
=== Theatrical ===
The film was released on May 17, 2017, in the Philippines, two days later on May 19 in the United States, and on May 26 in the United Kingdom.

=== Home media ===
The film was released on Digital HD from Amazon Video and iTunes on August 1, 2017, and on Blu-ray and DVD on August 8, 2017, by 20th Century Fox Home Entertainment. It grossed $2.6 million in home video sales.

=== Novel ===
A book detailing the film's creation, titled The Wimpy Kid Movie Diary: The Next Chapter, was released on May 1, 2017.

== Reception ==
=== Box office ===
The film grossed $20.7 million in the United States and Canada and $19.3 million in other countries for a worldwide total of $40.1 million, against a production budget of $22 million. It was the lowest-grossing film of the Diary of a Wimpy Kid series by a wide margin.

In North America, the film was initially projected to gross around $12 million from 3,129 theaters during its opening weekend. However, after grossing $2 million on its first day, projections were lowered to $7 million. It ended up finishing with $7.1 million, placing 6th at the box office and marking the lowest opening of the franchise by a wide margin.

When the film was released in the United Kingdom, it opened at #2, behind Pirates of the Caribbean: Dead Men Tell No Tales with £1,444,092. The film was a box office disappointment, grossing just $40.1 million worldwide.

=== Critical response ===
On Rotten Tomatoes, the film has an approval rating of 19% based on 70 reviews and an average rating of 4.20/10. The site's critical consensus reads, "With an all-new cast but the same juvenile humor, Diary of a Wimpy Kid: The Long Haul finds the franchise still stuck in arrested – and largely unfunny – development." On Metacritic, it has a score of 39 out of 100 based on 16 critics, indicating "generally unfavorable" reviews. Audiences polled by CinemaScore gave it an average grade of "B" on an A+ to F scale, down from the first three films' "A−".

Dennis Harvey of Variety was more positive, calling the film "an amiable, fast-paced entry that should win over fans." Jesse Hassenger of The A.V. Club called the film "repetitive and uninspired".

Christy Lemire of RogerEbert.com criticized it, saying it "Jettisons everything that’s honest and worthwhile about the books in favor of hackneyed misadventures and gross-out scatological humor." Jody Mitori of the St. Louis Post-Dispatch gave The Long Haul two stars out of four and commented on its increase of gross-out humor compared to the book version and previous films. Linda Cook of The Quad City Times called it the worst film of the year so far.

=== Internet controversy ===
Charlie Wright, who portrayed Rodrick Heffley, became the subject of Internet memes and criticism in an Internet campaign using the hashtag #NotMyRodrick due to his physical appearance differing from that of Devon Bostick, who portrayed Rodrick in the first three Diary of a Wimpy Kid films. In March 2024, Wright posted a video to YouTube and TikTok detailing his experience with the criticism, stating that he received death threats and was cyberbullied due to his performance in the film.

== Future ==
=== Cancelled sequels ===
In 2024, Charlie Wright stated that two sequels to The Long Haul were planned, but were canceled due to the film underperforming at the box office, gaining negative reviews, and that it "didn't do what the studio wanted it to do".

=== Reboot ===
Following the release of Diary of a Wimpy Kid: Dog Days, the likelihood of any potential future live-action films was slim. In 2012, Jeff Kinney, the author of the Diary of a Wimpy Kid books, had announced the possibility for an animated film to be based on Diary of a Wimpy Kid: Cabin Fever as the next installment. In an interview for Diary of a Wimpy Kid: Hard Luck, Kinney stated he was working with Fox on a half-hour special based on Cabin Fever, which was to be aired in late 2014, but as of 2022, it never came to fruition. In August 2018, CEO of 20th Century Fox Stacey Snider announced that a fully animated television series based on Diary of a Wimpy Kid was in development. On August 6, 2019, after the acquisition of 21st Century Fox by Disney, the project was confirmed to be still in development for the then-upcoming Disney+.

In December 2020, the project was confirmed to have been redeveloped as an animated film titled Diary of a Wimpy Kid, with production already started and with a release year of 2021. On September 2, 2021, it was announced that the film would be released on December 3, 2021, confirmed to simply be titled Diary of a Wimpy Kid, and it would be a retelling of the first book in the series. Swinton Scott was announced as director, and Kinney as producer and writer. Brady Noon, Ethan William Childress, and Chris Diamantopoulos were also announced to be part of the voice cast. Noon voiced Greg, Childress voiced Rowley, and Diamantopoulos voiced Greg's father Frank. Erica Cerra, Hunter Dillon, and Gracen Newton later joined the voice cast of the film. Cerra voiced Greg's mother, Susan, while Dillon and Newton voiced Greg's brothers Rodrick and Manny. The film was released on December 3, 2021, on Disney+, to generally positive reviews. A sequel, Rodrick Rules, was released on December 2, 2022, but was not as critically successful as its predecessor. Another sequel, Diary of a Wimpy Kid Christmas: Cabin Fever was released on December 8, 2023, which was followed by Diary of a Wimpy Kid: The Last Straw, which released on December 5, 2025.
