= Grayson Russell =

American actor

- Born: May 1, 1998 (age 28); Clanton, Alabama, U.S.
- Occupation: Actor
- Years active: 2005–present
- Partner(s): Rachel Schumacher (2024–present; engaged)

Grayson Russell (born May 1, 1998) is an American actor. He is best known for his roles in Talladega Nights: The Ballad of Ricky Bobby and the Diary of a Wimpy Kid film series. He had a recurring role as Dwayne Dixon on the INSP television series Blue Ridge.

== Life and career ==
Russell was born on May 1, 1998 in Clanton, Alabama, the son of Crystal (née Cleckley) and Jerry Russell, who have a Christian music ministry. He attended public high school in Clanton at Chilton County High School, home of the Tigers, and graduated from there in 2016. Russell later attended Lee University in Cleveland, Tennessee, for a brief time.

Russell's acting career began at the age of six, when he appeared as Cowboy Grayson, in a series of television commercials for a local car dealership. Other commercials include appearances in a regional McDonald's spot, and a Blue Cross Blue Shield of Tennessee commercial. Russell's film career began with an open casting call for a role in Talladega Nights: The Ballad of Ricky Bobby.

Russell's mother, Crystal Russell, has stated that Grayson auditioned to gain some experience with the process, and the family was surprised to learn that he would be playing Texas Ranger Bobby, the son of racecar driver Ricky Bobby (played by Will Ferrell).

The Rainbow Tribe, Russell's second movie, was based on a true story, and was filmed in California in 2007. The independent film won Best Picture at the 2008 The Feel Good Film Festival founded by Kristen Ridgway Flores in Los Angeles, but was released direct-to-video in 2011.

In 2009, Russell appeared in an episode of Disney's sitcom I'm in the Band. By the next year, Russell appeared in the film adaptation of author Jeff Kinney's Diary of a Wimpy Kid. Russell played Fregley, an awkward and unpopular classmate of Greg Heffley. He reprised the role in the sequels, Diary of a Wimpy Kid: Rodrick Rules (2011) and Diary of a Wimpy Kid: Dog Days (2012).

Also by the next year, Russell also appeared in the Alien Candy episode of R.L. Stine's The Haunting Hour. Russell plays an autistic baseball savant named Rafer, in the 2013 feature film Season of Miracles, a role for which fans and critics have acknowledged his broader acting range.

In 2020, Grayson played a signalman in the Apple TV+ movie Greyhound starring Tom Hanks.

In 2024, he began playing the role of Dwayne Dixon in Blue Ridge. He returned to the role in 2026 for its second season.

He is also a musician and occasionally makes music with his Diary of a Wimpy Kid co-star, Zachary Gordon in Nashville, Tennessee.

== Personal life ==
Russell became engaged to his girlfriend, Rachel Schumacher, on January 14, 2024.

== Filmography ==
=== Film ===
Year	Film	Role
2006	Talladega Nights: The Ballad of Ricky Bobby	Texas Ranger Bobby
2008	The Rainbow Tribe	Calvin
2010	Diary of a Wimpy Kid	Fregley
2011	Diary of a Wimpy Kid: Rodrick Rules	Fregley
2011	Marley & Me: The Puppy Years	Marley (voice)
2012	Diary of a Wimpy Kid: Dog Days	Fregley
2013	Space Warriors	Russell "Rusty" Riggs
2013	Season of Miracles	Rafer
2015	How I Got Made	Sean McCrorie
2016	Mother's Day	Tommy
2019	Christmas in July	Jimmy
2019	Apparition	Sam
2020	Greyhound	Signalman #1

=== Television ===
Year	Show	Role	Notes
2009	I'm in the Band	Martin	Episode: "Birthdazed"
2011	R.L. Stine's The Haunting Hour	Walt	Episode: "Alien Candy"
2011	Pajanimals	Himself	Episode: "An Octopus Hug"
2020	Tell Me a Story	Allen	Episode: "Sweet Dreams"
2024–present	Blue Ridge	Dwayne Dixon	Recurring role; Main cast
