= Diary of a Wimpy Kid (film series) =

Family comedy film series

- (Top): Logo as seen on one of the live-action films' trailers (Bottom): Logo for the animated film
- Based on: Diary of a Wimpy Kid by Jeff Kinney
- Production companies: Live-action films: Fox 2000 Pictures; Color Force; Animated films: Bardel Entertainment; 20th Century Animation; Walt Disney Pictures
- Distributed by: 20th Century Fox (2010–2017; live action films); Disney+ (2021–present; animated films)

Diary of a Wimpy Kid is a series of family comedy films based on the book series of the same name by Jeff Kinney. It consists of four live-action films and four animated films, with a fifth and sixth animated film announced.

== Films ==
=== Live-action films ===
==== Diary of a Wimpy Kid (2010) ====
Principal production began on August 12, 2009, and was completed on October 16, 2009. The film was directed by Thor Freudenthal and starred Zachary Gordon as Greg Heffley, Robert Capron as Rowley Jefferson, Rachael Harris as Susan Heffley, Steve Zahn as Frank Heffley, Devon Bostick as Rodrick Heffley, Connor and Owen Fielding as Manny Heffley, Chloë Grace Moretz as Angie Steadman, Grayson Russell as Fregley, Laine MacNeil as Patty Farrell, and Karan Brar as Chirag Gupta. It was the only film in the series to be directed by Freudenthal. The musical score was composed by Theodore Shapiro. It received mixed reviews from critics. It was released on March 19, 2010, as it moved up from a previously scheduled April 2 release date.

==== Diary of a Wimpy Kid: Rodrick Rules (2011) ====
Based on the second book, Rodrick Rules, with elements from The Last Straw. Principal photography began on August 23, 2010, and was completed on October 27, 2010, with filming taking place in Vancouver and New Westminster. The film was directed by David Bowers, with Zachary Gordon reprising his role as Greg Heffley. New main characters include Holly Hills (Peyton List), Grandpa (Terence Kelly), and Bill Walter (Fran Kranz). Edward Shearmur composes the original score for the film. It also received mixed reviews from critics. It was released on March 25, 2011.

==== Diary of a Wimpy Kid: Dog Days (2012) ====
Based on the third book The Last Straw and the fourth book Dog Days, the film was directed by David Bowers and features the same familiar cast of characters, introducing a few new ones, and also focusing on lesser characters not elaborated on in previous films, including Frank Heffley (Steve Zahn), Mr. Jefferson (Alf Humphreys) and Holly Hills (Peyton List). The film is the last one to feature the original cast, as they had outgrown their roles after filming wrapped. It also received mixed reviews from critics. It was released on August 3, 2012.

==== Diary of a Wimpy Kid: The Long Haul (2017) ====
Featuring an entirely new cast, the plot follows Greg and his brother, Rodrick, unwillingly being taken on a family road trip to their great-grandmother's house for her 90th birthday party. Greg sees this as an opportunity to meet his Internet idol, Mac Digby, and get people to forget about him being dubbed as a meme known as "Diaper Hands". The film was panned by critics and audiences, with most of the criticism aimed at the casting change. It was released on May 19, 2017.

=== Animated films ===
==== Diary of a Wimpy Kid (2021) ====
In August 2018, 20th Century Fox CEO Stacey Snider announced that a fully animated television series based on Diary of a Wimpy Kid was in development. On August 6, 2019, after the acquisition of 21st Century Fox by Disney, the project was confirmed to be still in development for their streaming service, Disney+.

In December 2020, the project was confirmed to have been redeveloped as an animated film. On September 2, 2021, Disney officially confirmed that the new movie would be simply titled Diary of a Wimpy Kid, and would be released on December 3, 2021. The movie is a re-adaptation of the first book and the characters appear similar in design to their appearances in the book series. The first trailer was officially released in October 2021. Unlike the previous films, which were produced by 20th Century Fox, this film was produced by Walt Disney Pictures, although it was originally in production at 20th Century Animation.

==== Diary of a Wimpy Kid: Rodrick Rules (2022) ====
On October 23, 2021, ahead of the first film's release, Jeff Kinney revealed that sequels are already in development. For Disney+ Day, Kinney revealed that the sequel, based on Rodrick Rules, was released on December 2, 2022. Unlike the first animated film, a copyright notice at the end of the trailer indicates that 20th Century Studios has involvement in the film.

==== Diary of a Wimpy Kid Christmas: Cabin Fever (2023) ====
On September 8, 2023, a film based on the sixth book, Cabin Fever was announced. It was released on December 8, 2023.

==== Diary of a Wimpy Kid: The Last Straw (2025) ====
At D23, on August 30, 2025, a film adaptation of the third book, The Last Straw, was announced and set to be directed by Matt Danner. Similarly to the original book, it centers around Greg attempting to persuade his father Frank to reconsider his intention to send him to a military academy to instill discipline and diligence. However, like Cabin Fever, it is Christmas-themed. It was released on December 5, 2025.

==== Diary of a Wimpy Kid Christmas: The Getaway (2026) ====
On July 28, 2025, ahead of the fourth film's release, Matt Danner revealed that a film adaptation of the 12th book, The Getaway, would serve as the fifth in the series. Danner is also attached as the fifth film's director, returning from The Last Straw, and stated that the film would release on December 4th 2026. In January of 2026, Kinney announced that he'd completed and sent the script for the film. An official trailer released on YouTube through the Disney and Wimpy Kid channels on November 4, 2026.

==== Sixth film ====
An untitled sixth film has been announced for Disney+ in 2027.

==== Future films ====
Jeff Kinney stated that he intends to adapt all the books into animated features for Disney+.

Film	U.S. release date	Director	Screenwriter(s)	Producer(s)
Live-action films (20th Century Fox)
Diary of a Wimpy Kid	March 19, 2010	Thor Freudenthal	Jeff Filgo, Jeff Judah, Gabe Sachs & Jackie Filgo	Brad Simpson & Nina Jacobson
Diary of a Wimpy Kid: Rodrick Rules	March 25, 2011	David Bowers	Jeff Judah & Gabe Sachs	Brad Simpson & Nina Jacobson
Diary of a Wimpy Kid: Dog Days	August 3, 2012	David Bowers	Maya Forbes & Wallace Wolodarsky	Brad Simpson & Nina Jacobson
Diary of a Wimpy Kid: The Long Haul	May 19, 2017	David Bowers	Jeff Kinney & David Bowers	Brad Simpson & Nina Jacobson
Animated films (Walt Disney Pictures)
Diary of a Wimpy Kid	December 3, 2021	Swinton Scott	Jeff Kinney	Jeff Kinney
Diary of a Wimpy Kid: Rodrick Rules	December 2, 2022	Luke Cormican	Jeff Kinney	Jeff Kinney
Diary of a Wimpy Kid Christmas: Cabin Fever	December 8, 2023	Luke Cormican	Jeff Kinney	Jeff Kinney
Diary of a Wimpy Kid: The Last Straw	December 5, 2025	Matt Danner	Jeff Kinney	Jeff Kinney
Diary of a Wimpy Kid Christmas: The Getaway	December 4, 2026	Matt Danner	TBA	TBA

== Class Clown short film ==
An animated short film set after the events of the third film, titled Class Clown, was included on the home media release of Dog Days in 2012. The short is told through Greg's point-of-view as he explains his experience with comedy and why he deserves the title of Class Clown at his School. Zachary Gordon reprises his role as Greg Heffley along with other cast members voicing their characters from the films in minor roles.

== Canceled TV special ==
In 2012, Jeff Kinney, the author of the Diary of a Wimpy Kid books, announced the possibility for an animated film to be based on Diary of a Wimpy Kid: Cabin Fever as the next installment. In an interview for Diary of a Wimpy Kid: Hard Luck, Kinney stated he was working with FOX on a half-hour special based on Cabin Fever, which was scheduled to air in late-2014. The special was meant to be an animated production developed at 20th Century Fox Animation, and had begun development while Kinney worked on the live-action films. An adaptation was eventually released in 2023 as Diary of a Wimpy Kid Christmas: Cabin Fever.

== Recurring cast and characters ==
List indicators

This section includes characters who will appear or have appeared in more than two films in the series.

- An empty grey cell indicates the character was not in the film, or that the character's official presence has not yet been confirmed.
- ^{E} indicates an appearance not included in the theatrical cut.
- ^{O} indicates an older version of the character.
- ^{U} indicates an uncredited appearance.
- ^{Y} indicates a younger version of the character.
- ^{S} indicates an appearance as a character's singing voice.

Character	Live-action films				Short film	Animated films				
Character	Diary of a Wimpy Kid	Diary of a Wimpy Kid: Rodrick Rules	Diary of a Wimpy Kid: Dog Days	Diary of a Wimpy Kid: The Long Haul	Class Clown	Diary of a Wimpy Kid	Diary of a Wimpy Kid: Rodrick Rules	Diary of a Wimpy Kid Christmas: Cabin Fever	Diary of a Wimpy Kid: The Last Straw	Diary of a Wimpy Kid: The Getaway
Primary cast
Gregory "Greg" Heffley	Zachary Gordon Nathaniel Marten^{O} Dylan Bell^{Y} L.J. Benet^{U}^{S}	Zachary Gordon	Zachary Gordon	Jason Drucker	Zachary Gordon	Brady Noon	Brady Noon	Wesley Kimmel	Aaron D. Harris	Jacob Isaac Peterson
Rowley Jefferson	Robert Capron	Robert Capron	Robert Capron	Owen Asztalos	Robert Capron	Ethan William Childress	Ethan William Childress	Spencer Howell	Jude Zarzaur	Jude Zarzaur
Rodrick Heffley	Devon Bostick	Devon Bostick Conner Ingram^{Y}	Devon Bostick	Charlie Wright	Devon Bostick	Hunter Dillon	Hunter Dillon	Hunter Dillon	Hunter Dillon	Hunter Dillon
Susan Heffley	Rachael Harris	Rachael Harris	Rachael Harris	Alicia Silverstone	Appeared	Erica Cerra	Erica Cerra	Erica Cerra	Erica Cerra	Erica Cerra
Frank Heffley	Steve Zahn	Steve Zahn	Steve Zahn	Tom Everett Scott	Steve Zahn	Chris Diamantopoulos	Chris Diamantopoulos	Chris Diamantopoulos	Chris Diamantopoulos	Chris Diamantopoulos
Manny Heffley	Connor and Owen Fielding	Connor and Owen Fielding	Connor and Owen Fielding	Wyatt and Dylan Walters	Appeared	Gracen Newton	Gracen Newton	Gracen Newton	Gracen Newton	Gracen Newton
Supporting cast
Chirag Gupta	Karan Brar	Karan Brar	Karan Brar			Veda Maharaj	Silent cameo		Abhiram Gulati	
Fregley	Grayson Russell	Grayson Russell	Grayson Russell			Christian Convery	Silent cameo	Christian Convery	Ellis Myers	
Patty Farrell	Laine MacNeil Madison Bell^{Y}	Laine MacNeil	Laine MacNeil				Silent cameo		Lila Bahng	
Coach (Note: In the live-action films, the coach who manages Westmore Middle Schools Gym activities is credited as Coach Malone. In the animated film, he is credited as Mr. Underwood, his name in the books.)	Andrew McNee	Andrew McNee	Andrew McNee			Billy Lopez			Unspecified voice	
Mr. Jefferson	Alfred E. Humphreys	Alfred E. Humphreys	Alfred E. Humphreys		Alfred E. Humphreys	Appeared		Randy Pearlstein	Randy Pearlstein	
Mrs. Norton	Belita Moreno	Belita Moreno							Silent cameo	
Bryce Anderson	Owen Best	Owen Best								
Shelly	Samantha Page	Samantha Page								
Marley	Ava Hughes	Ava Hughes								
Archie Kelly	Jake D. Smith	Jake D. Smith								
Pete Hosey	Nicholas Carey					Zeno Robinson	Silent cameo		Silent cameo	
Mr. Winsky	Rob LaBelle								Punam Patel (Note: This version of the character is female.)	
Carter	Samuel Patrick Chu					Cyrus Arnold (Note: Credited as Teen Driver.)				
Wade	Donnie MacNeil					Braxton Baker (Note: Credited as "Teen with Mullet".)				
Principal (Note: Credited as Vice Principal Roy in the first live-action film as in the original books, and Mr. Humphreys in the animated film.)	Raugi Yu					Donny Lucas				
Mrs. Jefferson	Kaye Capron		Bronwen Smith			Photograph		Silent role		
Mrs. Fregley	Gabrielle Rose^{E}					Brenda Crichlow				
Bill Walter	Appears in end credits	Fran Kranz					Jimmy Tatro			
Holly Hills		Peyton List	Peyton List							
Grandpa Heffley		Terence Kelly	Terence Kelly	Photograph			Ed Asner	Photograph	Photograph	Photograph
Mr. Draybick		John Shaw	John Shaw							
Ben Segal		Bryce Hodgson	Bryce Hodgson							
Chris		Christopher Thorgard-De Schuster	Christopher Thorgard-De Schuster							
Taylor Pringle		Dalila Bela	Dalila Bela							
Mr. Hills		Jeff Kinney	Jeff Kinney							
Hillary Hills		Emily Holmes^{U}	Emily Holmes							
Mr. Gupta		Harry Brar^{U}							Sanjay Rao	
Mr. Warren			Phillip Maurice Hayes (Note: This version of the character appears with the first name "Stan".)						Bashir Salahuddin (Note: This version of the character appears with the first name "Walt".)	
Troop Master Barrett			Frank C. Turner						William Stanford Davis	
Lenwood Heath			Tom Stevens						Jabari Banks	
Mrs. Warren			Anne Openshaw						Melique Berger^{U}	

== Crew ==
Role	Film							
Role	Diary of a Wimpy Kid (2010)	Diary of a Wimpy Kid: Rodrick Rules (2011)	Diary of a Wimpy Kid: Dog Days (2012)	Diary of a Wimpy Kid: The Long Haul (2017)	Diary of a Wimpy Kid (2021)	Diary of a Wimpy Kid: Rodrick Rules (2022)	Diary of a Wimpy Kid Christmas: Cabin Fever (2023)	Diary of a Wimpy Kid: The Last Straw (2025)
Composer	Theodore Shapiro	Edward Shearmur	Edward Shearmur	Edward Shearmur	John Paesano	John Paesano	John Paesano	John Paesano; Adam Hochstatter
Cinematographer	Jack N. Green	Jack N. Green	Anthony B. Richmond	Anthony B. Richmond	—N/a	—N/a	—N/a	—N/a
Editor	Wendy Greene Bricmont	Troy Takaki	Troy Takaki	Troy Takaki	Sylvain Blais	Sylvain Blais; Rob Levesque; Matthew Sipple	Adam Pateman	

== Reception ==
=== Box office performance ===
Film	Budget	Box office gross			All-time ranking		Ref.
Film	Budget	U.S. and Canada	Other territories	Worldwide	U.S. and Canada	Worldwide	Ref.
Diary of a Wimpy Kid (2010)	$15 million	$64,003,625	$12,192,913	$76,196,538	1,341	2,127	
Diary of a Wimpy Kid: Rodrick Rules	$18–21 million	$52,698,535	$19,828,461	$72,526,996	1,685	2,189	
Diary of a Wimpy Kid: Dog Days	$22 million	$49,008,662	$28,221,033	$77,229,695	1,826	2,695	
Diary of a Wimpy Kid: The Long Haul	$22 million	$20,738,724	$19,402,248	$40,140,972	3,634	3,800	
Total	$77-80 million	$186,449,546	$79,644,655	$266,094,201	211	273	

=== Critical and public response ===
Critical and public response of Diary of a Wimpy Kid films
Film	Critical		Public
Film	Rotten Tomatoes	Metacritic	CinemaScore
Diary of a Wimpy Kid (2010)	54% (106 reviews)	56 (27 reviews)	A−
Diary of a Wimpy Kid: Rodrick Rules (2011)	48% (98 reviews)	51 (23 reviews)	A−
Diary of a Wimpy Kid: Dog Days	52% (73 reviews)	54 (22 reviews)	A−
Diary of a Wimpy Kid: The Long Haul	18% (72 reviews)	39 (16 reviews)	B
Diary of a Wimpy Kid (2021)	75% (16 reviews)	50 (4 reviews)	—N/a
Diary of a Wimpy Kid: Rodrick Rules (2022)	56% (9 reviews)	50 (4 reviews)	—N/a
Diary of a Wimpy Kid Christmas: Cabin Fever (2023)	75% (8 reviews)	—N/a	—N/a
Diary of a Wimpy Kid: The Last Straw (2025)			
Diary of a Wimpy Kid Christmas: The Getaway (2026)			
