= Double Down =

Double down is a betting technique in blackjack.

Double Down or Doubling Down may refer to:

- Double Down: Game Change 2012, a 2013 book about the 2012 United States Presidential election
- Double Down (comics), a DC Comics villain
- Double Down (film), a 2001 American drama film
- Double Down, a 2005 American independent film produced and directed by Neil Breen
- Double Down, a 2020 American psychological thriller film
- "Double Down" (Journeyman), an episode of Journeyman
- Double Down (sandwich), a sandwich offered by Kentucky Fried Chicken
- Double Down, a televised high school quiz program in Syracuse, New York
- Double down, a roller coaster element involving two separate drops
- Diary of a Wimpy Kid: Double Down, the eleventh book in the Diary of a Wimpy Kid series
- "Doubling Down" (Drag Race Down Under), a 2024 TV episode
- "Doubling Down" (South Park), a 2017 TV episode

== See also ==
- Double Down Live: 1980 & 2008, a 2009 album by ZZ Top
  - Double Down Live Tour, a 2009 concert tour by ZZ Top
