= Tuscaloosa (disambiguation) =

Tuscaloosa is the name of two places in the United States of America, named after the Native American chief, Tuskaloosa:

- Tuscaloosa, Alabama
- Tuscaloosa County, Alabama

== Music ==
- Tuscaloosa (album), a 2019 live album by Neil Young and the Stray Gators

== Film ==
- Tuscaloosa (film), a 2019 American film starring Natalia Dyer

== U.S. military vessels ==
- USS Tuscaloosa (CA-37), U.S. Navy New Orleans-class heavy cruiser
- USS Tuscaloosa (LST-1187), U.S. Navy Newport-class of tank landing ships (LST)
