= Diary of a Wimpy Kid: Old School =

Children's book by Jeff Kinney

- Author: Jeff Kinney
- Illustrator: Jeff Kinney
- Language: English
- Series: Diary of a Wimpy Kid
- Genre: Children's novel Graphic Novel; Comedy
- Publisher: Amulet Books (US); Puffin Books (UK)
- Publication date: November 3, 2015 (worldwide); January 26, 2017 (paperback re-issue)
- Publication place: United States
- Media type: Print (paperback, hardcover)
- Pages: 217 story pages (224 altogether)
- ISBN: 978-1-4197-1701-7
- Preceded by: The Long Haul
- Followed by: Double Down

Diary of a Wimpy Kid: Old School is the tenth book of the Diary of a Wimpy Kid series by Jeff Kinney, preceded by Diary of a Wimpy Kid: The Long Haul and followed by Diary of a Wimpy Kid: Double Down. The book was released worldwide on November 3, 2015, though an extract from the book was released online on October 27, 2015.

== Plot ==
Greg Heffley talks about how his mother does not like technology and smartphones, and is starting a petition to stop the town from using electronic devices for a weekend. When the school year starts, Greg signs up for the Homework Buddies program. His Homework Buddy, a third grader named Frew, quickly completes Greg's homework. At home, Greg's grandfather moves in with them after the rent was raised at his retirement home, Leisure Towers, and that his girlfriend, Darlene, broke up with him. After Greg forgets to screw the toothpaste cap back on, his father Frank lectures him about how small things can lead to big consequences.

Greg hears about a school trip to an old-fashioned farm known as Hardscrabble Farms, which he initially decides not to attend. His mother gets enough signatures for her petition for the town to voluntarily switch off their devices. The next day, Greg and Rowley start up a lemonade stand, only to attend the park cleanup, which was also planned by his mother, much to Greg's dismay, and he gets tired and runs away, then meets up with Frew. A teenager named Billy Rotner doing community service also follows them, and when they are found by adults, Greg pins the blame on Billy.

Back at home, while his parents are away, Greg tries to put the toothpaste cap back on after brushing his teeth, but it falls down the drain. He loosens a pipe to get it, but forgets to turn off the water valve first, causing a puddle of water to leak downstairs. His grandfather tells him that they can buy paint and cover up the stain, but while on the road, he drives the wrong direction and the car runs out of gas; Greg had revealed that his grandfather had his drivers' license revoked. Greg accidentally moves the car, which falls into a ditch, and his mom arrives. He decides to go on the trip to leave town and avoid facing punishment from Frank.

After arriving at the farm, Greg is placed into a team of "leftover" kids, including Rowley. They do lots of work and games, including one that causes the tooth of a kid named Gareth to sink into Rowley's forehead, causing Rowley to leave. Greg hears rumors about a deranged farmer named Silas Scratch - the county kicked the farmer out of his land to set up the school, so he ate slugs and berries and grew long fingernails - who allegedly still wanders around the area. The kids struggle to adapt to their uncomfortable cabins, with one named Julian Trimble eating part of his deodorant stick to become sick as an excuse to leave, which caused the chaperones to take all their deodorant so they do not try to eat it, just in time for Rowley to come back.

Greg and his cabin-mates decide to raid other cabins for deodorant, since their cabin smells awful due to their dirty clothes, socks lying everywhere, and sweat. They steal one of the teachers' bags, and after they are caught, Frank is called as an emergency chaperone. While gathering firewood for the final night of camp, which is spent outside, Greg comes across an old shack that he thinks Silas Scratch lives in, which actually turns out to be a clean maintenance shed.

Greg encounters his dad, who explains that he invented the rumor about Silas Scratch to stop people from coming in the shack, which he had used as shelter himself. Frank sneaks everybody into the cabin to sleep. Greg says that he might be stuck chaperoning at the farm when he is older, and he will want to use the shack as well, so he continues to spread rumors about Silas Scratch as he leaves.

== Marketing ==
The book was announced on March 9, 2015. The cover, color, and title were revealed on April 27, 2015 during a live stream co-hosted by Jeff Kinney, with appearances from Robert Capron live on stage, and Zachary Gordon through a video call. At the 2015 Diary of a Wimpy Kid Virtually Live Event, Jeff Kinney stated that the book is black because he believes that black is a cartoonist's favorite color. An extract from the book was released exclusively by The Guardian on June 29, 2015.
