= Scott Franklin =

Scott Franklin may refer to:

- Scott Franklin (politician), American politician
- Scott Franklin (producer), American film producer
- Scott Franklin (rugby union) (born 1980), Canadian rugby union player
