= Diary of a Wimpy Kid (2010 film) =

Comedy film by Thor Freudenthal

- Theatrical release poster
- Directed by: Thor Freudenthal
- Screenplay by: Jackie Filgo Jeff Filgo; Jeff Judah; Gabe Sachs
- Based on: Diary of a Wimpy Kid by Jeff Kinney
- Produced by: Nina Jacobson; Brad Simpson
- Starring: Zachary Gordon; Robert Capron; Rachael Harris; Steve Zahn
- Cinematography: Jack Green
- Edited by: Wendy Greene Bricmont
- Music by: Theodore Shapiro
- Production companies: Fox 2000 Pictures; Color Force
- Distributed by: 20th Century Fox
- Release date: March 19, 2010
- Running time: 92 minutes
- Country: United States
- Language: English
- Budget: $15 million
- Box office: $76.2 million

Diary of a Wimpy Kid is a 2010 American comedy film directed by Thor Freudenthal, based on Jeff Kinney's 2007 novel. The film stars Zachary Gordon, Robert Capron, Rachael Harris and Steve Zahn. The screenplay by Jackie and Jeff Filgo, Jeff Judah, and Gabe Sachs chronicles Greg Heffley's first year of middle school and his attempt at achieving popularity.

The film was released in the United States on March 19, 2010, by 20th Century Fox. It received mixed reviews from critics and grossed $76 million against a $15 million budget. The film spawned its own film series starting with a sequel, subtitled Rodrick Rules, which released the following year. A book detailing the film's creation process, The Wimpy Kid Movie Diary, was released in 2010.

== Plot ==
Preteen Greg Heffley illustrates his daily life in a diary for when he is "rich and famous". On Greg's first day of middle school, he quickly discovers the ups and downs, such as the missing stall doors in the boys' bathroom and the difficulties of obtaining a seat during lunch. During physical education, Greg and his best friend, Rowley Jefferson, escape from a game of shirts-and-skins-based flag football and meet Angie Steadman, a seventh-grader who isolates herself from the other students to "survive". They notice a rotting and moldy piece of cheese and are told by their classmate Chirag Gupta to not touch it, as this would result in acquiring the "Cheese Touch", a social curse. The only way to get rid of it is by tapping someone, thereby passing the curse on to them. Greg states his intentions of becoming the most popular student in school and earning a place in the school yearbook as "Class Clown".

When Greg and Rowley go out trick-or-treating on Halloween, a group of teenage boys assault and chase them to the currently-vacant residence of Greg's grandmother. They escape after Greg threatens, but accidentally damages their pickup truck with a string trimmer.

In other efforts to become popular, the boys join the Safety Patrol team and a contest to become the school paper's cartoonist. After Greg accidentally breaks Rowley's arm during a game they invented, Rowley becomes popular and wins the cartoonist contest. During a Safety Patrol assignment, Greg walks kindergartners down a neighborhood street without Rowley. He encounters a truck identical to the teenagers' from Halloween and hides the kids in a construction zone. Having borrowed Rowley's coat, he is confronted by a neighbor who mistakes him for Rowley. He flees, abandoning the kindergarteners. Rowley is bewildered to be suspended from Safety Patrol until Greg confesses, albeit foolishly offering it as a joke, and he ends their friendship. After Greg is dismissed from the service and Rowley is reinstated as captain, the latter befriends fellow student Collin Lee.

Greg and Rowley get into a heated argument after Greg refuses to return a video game he borrowed from Rowley. A circle of students encourages them to fight before the teenagers from Halloween arrive and, having chased the other students into the school, hold the duo captive as retribution. They force Rowley to eat some of the cheese, but before Greg is forced to eat the rest of it, the teenagers flee when physical education teacher Coach Eduardo Malone arrives. When the other students come back out and notice the cheese has been eaten, Greg takes the blame to save Rowley's reputation and they reconcile. At the end of the school year, Greg and Rowley make the yearbook class favorites page as "Cutest Friends".

== Cast ==
- Zachary Gordon as Greg Heffley
- Robert Capron as Rowley Jefferson, Greg's best friend
- Rachael Harris as Susan Heffley, Greg's mother
- Steve Zahn as Frank Heffley, Greg's father
- Devon Bostick as Rodrick Heffley, Greg's mean elder brother
- Chloë Grace Moretz as Angie Steadman, a seventh-grader at Greg's school
- Grayson Russell as Fregley, Greg's classmate
- Laine MacNeil as Patty Farrell, Greg's arch-enemy
- Karan Brar as Chirag Gupta, Greg's friend
- Connor and Owen Fielding as Manny Heffley, Greg's younger brother
- Alex Ferris as Collin Lee
- Andrew McNee as Coach Malone, Greg's physical education teacher
- Belita Moreno as Mrs. Norton, Greg's acting teacher
- Alf Humphreys as Mr. Jefferson, Rowley's father
- Kaye Capron as Mrs. Jefferson, Rowley's mother

== Production ==
An adaptation of the first Diary of a Wimpy Kid novel was announced in 2008, with Thor Freudenthal signing on as director in December 2008. In July 2009, Zachary Gordon was cast in the lead role of Greg Heffley. Rachael Harris also signed on for the role of Susan Heffley, Greg's mother. In August 2009, Steve Zahn was cast as Frank Heffley, Greg's father.

=== Visual effects ===
The mold for the Cheese was completely digital. Filmmakers left a real square of cheese outside for a few days inside a wire cage to keep animals out and sunlight in, and after this, a piece of cheese was made out of silicone and had mold effects added using CGI.

The animated sequences were not 2D animated, but in fact made with 3D animation. The animated sequences were first animated in 3D, and then rendered in a rough sketch shader to make them look 2D.

== Release ==
=== Tie-in book ===
A tie-in book, written by Kinney, called The Wimpy Kid Movie Diary, was published on March 16, 2010, by Amulet Books (an imprint of Abrams Books). It includes film stills, storyboards, preliminary concept drawings and also behind-the-scenes information to humorously chronicle the making of Diary of a Wimpy Kid, Diary of a Wimpy Kid: Rodrick Rules, and Diary of a Wimpy Kid: Dog Days. It also includes some new illustrations.

=== Home media ===
The film was released on DVD and Blu-ray on August 3, 2010. The DVD bonus features include a comentary track from director Thor Freudenthal and co-writer Gabe Sachs, deleted scenes called “diary pages” and the film's theatrical trailer. The Blu-ray version features six pages from Rowley's diary, Diary of an Awesome, Friendly Kid. It was released on the streaming service Disney+ on November 12, 2019; its launch date.

== Reception ==
=== Critical response ===
On the review aggregator website Rotten Tomatoes, 54% of 107 critics' reviews are positive, with an average rating of 5.5/10. The website's consensus reads: "Unlike its bestselling source material, Diary of a Wimpy Kid fails to place a likable protagonist at the center of its middle-school humor – and its underlying message is drowned out as a result." Metacritic, which uses a weighted average, assigned the film a score of 56 out of 100, based on 26 critics, indicating "mixed or average" reviews. Audience surveyed by CinemaScore gave this film an "A-."

Roger Ebert gave the film three-and-a-half stars out of four, writing "It's nimble, bright and funny. It doesn't dumb down. It doesn't patronize. It knows something about human nature." Glenn Whipp of the Associated Press was less positive, saying, "In transferring the clean, precise humor of Kinney's illustrations and prose to the big-screen, the material loses just a bit of its charm." At the Movies host David Stratton gave the film one star while co-host Margaret Pomeranz gave it half a star. Stratton called the film "tiresome" and said there was "nothing remotely interesting in Thor Freudenthal's direction or the screenplay." Pomeranz disliked the character of Greg Heffley, saying "I really thought he was unpleasant. I did not want to spend time with him. I could not wait for the end of this film."

OregonLive.com gave the film a C+ grade, criticizing it for being "too often dull, unappealing and clumsy, hobbled by unnecessary changes and inventions that add no charm, energy or, truly, point."

=== Box office ===
Despite a lack of distinctive marketing, Diary of a Wimpy Kid drew a decent crowd, opening to $22.1 million on approximately 3,400 screens at 3,077 sites, in second place at the weekend box office behind Alice in Wonderland but beating out the heavily hyped The Bounty Hunter. It was the biggest start ever for a non-animated, non-fantasy children's book adaptation. Diary of a Wimpy Kid grossed more in its first three days than other film adaptions to children's novels like How to Eat Fried Worms and Hoot grossed in their entire runs. The film grossed $64,003,625 in North America and $11,696,873 in other territories for a worldwide total of $75,700,498.

=== Accolades ===
| Year | Award | Category | Recipients | Result | Ref. |
|---|---|---|---|---|---|
| 2011 | Nickelodeon Kids' Choice Awards | Favorite Movie | Diary of a Wimpy Kid | Nominated | |
| 2011 | Young Artist Awards | Best Performance in a Feature Film - Leading Young Actor | Zachary Gordon | Nominated | |
| 2011 | Young Artist Awards | Best Performance in a Feature Film - Supporting Young Actor | Robert Capron | Nominated | |
| 2011 | Young Artist Awards | Best Performance in a Feature Film - Supporting Young Actor | Alex Ferris | Nominated | |
| 2011 | Young Artist Awards | Best Performance in a Feature Film - Supporting Young Actress | Laine MacNeil | Nominated | |
| 2011 | Young Artist Awards | Best Performance in a Feature Film - Young Ensemble Cast | Zachary Gordon, Robert Capron, Devon Bostick, Chloë Grace Moretz, Laine MacNeil, Grayson Russell, Karan Brar, and Alex Ferris | Won | |

== Expanded franchise ==
=== Sequels ===
Three sequels were released in 2011, 2012 and 2017 respectively. Diary of a Wimpy Kid: Rodrick Rules was released on March 25, 2011. It was based on the second book in the series, Rodrick Rules. Zachary Gordon reprised his role in the film. Diary of a Wimpy Kid: Dog Days was released on August 3, 2012, and is based on The Last Straw and Dog Days, including scenes from both books. An animated short film, Diary of a Wimpy Kid: Class Clown, was released along with the DVD of Dog Days. A film based on The Long Haul was released in May 2017 and features a new cast starring Jason Drucker, Alicia Silverstone, and Tom Everett Scott, but received generally negative reviews.

=== Animated reboot and sequels ===
An animated reboot directed by Swinton Scott was released on Disney+ on December 3, 2021. Unlike the other films, this was the first Diary of a Wimpy Kid film to be animated fully in computer-generated imagery and features Greg and the characters in colors. Originally set as an adaptation of Cabin Fever by Kinney, it was re-announced in 2018 as an animated series but switched to a CGI movie in 2019. It stars Brady Noon, Ethan William Childress, and Chris Diamantopoulos.
