= Diary of a Wimpy Kid: The Long Haul =

2014 book by Jeff Kinney

- Author: Jeff Kinney
- Illustrator: Jeff Kinney
- Language: English
- Series: Diary of a Wimpy Kid
- Genre: Child, Humor
- Publisher: Amulet Books (US); Puffin Books (UK)
- Publication date: November 4, 2014 January 28, 2016 (paperback re-issue)
- Publication place: United States
- Media type: Print (paperback, hardcover)
- Pages: 217
- ISBN: 978-1-4197-1189-3
- Preceded by: Hard Luck
- Followed by: Old School

Diary of a Wimpy Kid: The Long Haul is the ninth book in the Diary of a Wimpy Kid series by Jeff Kinney. On April 28, 2014, Kinney announced the book's name and the color of its cover. The book was released on November 4, 2014. It received generally positive reviews from critics.

== Plot ==
At the start of Greg Heffley's summer vacation, Susan announces that the family will go on a surprise road trip. Frank decides to bring their boat, towing it on the back of the van. While spending the first night of their trip at a run-down motel, Greg is scared by the father of two kids, who he yelled at for making noise during the night. The next day, the Heffleys visit the county fair, where Manny wins a live pig by correctly guessing the weight of a pig. While driving, Greg notices the family from the motel in a purple van, calling them "the Beardos" after the father's notable beard.

At a hotel the next night, the pig eats food from the minibar in Greg and Rodrick's room, costing them money. After many more incidents with the pig, Susan and Frank donate it to the petting zoo. The next morning, Susan takes the family to the beach. Greg feeds a seagull one of his snacks, causing a flock of them to fly into the car. Panicked, Rodrick accidentally presses the gas, causing him to rear-end another car. They learn from a mechanic that the van will take hours to fix, so they decide to spend time at a nearby water park known as Soak Central. After going on a raft ride, Greg discovers that the Beardos have taken their beach chair.

Susan and Frank place their cell phones and wallets in a locker, and when they decide to leave, they find out that they have lost the key. After an employee opens the locker, they find that their belongings are missing. Greg tells his family about the Beardos, but notices that they are leaving before they can be confronted. The Heffleys get the car back from the mechanic, and are advised to keep the heater on to prevent the radiator from breaking. As they get close to home, they notice the Beardos' van at the motel they stayed at. After seeing the Beardos forget to lock their door, they enter the room to search for their belongings but fail to find them. After the Beardos return, they manage to escape.

The Heffleys forget to heed the mechanic's advice, and the car breaks down. As it rolls to a stop, they run over a broken bottle and pop a tire. A purple van approaches, which Greg believes to be the Beardos, but they end up being two Spanish-speaking men. Manny is able to communicate with them in perfect Spanish, having learned it from the Spanish CD played during the road trip, and convinces them to give them a ride home. The group stops at the petting zoo, where Manny reunites with his pig.

Back at home, Greg now has to adjust to living with the pig, his parents get new credit cards and cell phones, and the boat is given to the Spanish men for their help. While Greg unpacks, he finds the key from Soak Central in his shorts, numbered "292", mistakenly thinking it was "929". Unsure what to do, and not wanting to get in trouble with his parents, Greg writes in his journal, "It's hard to see this story having a happy ending".

== Reception ==
Reception was positive. Common Sense Media gave the book four out of five stars. A review from The Malling School gave it 4.5 out of 5 stars.

== Film adaptation ==
A film adaptation of the book, starring Jason Drucker replacing Zachary Gordon as Greg Heffley, was released on May 19, 2017.
