= Diary of a Wimpy Kid: The Getaway =

2017 children's novel

- Author: Jeff Kinney
- Language: English
- Series: Diary of a Wimpy Kid
- Genre: Children's novel Graphic novel
- Publisher: Amulet Books (US); Puffin Books (UK)
- Publication date: November 7, 2017 (Worldwide); January 24, 2019 (paperback re-issue)
- Publication place: United States
- Media type: Print (hardcover)
- Pages: 217 story pages (224 altogether)
- ISBN: 978-1-4197-2545-6
- Preceded by: Double Down
- Followed by: The Meltdown

Diary of a Wimpy Kid: The Getaway is the twelfth book in the Diary of a Wimpy Kid series by Jeff Kinney. The book was unveiled during the 2017 Diary of a Wimpy Kid Virtually Live Event which was live streamed via YouTube as part of the 10th anniversary of the first book. The book was published and released on November 7, 2017. The book is about Greg and his family flying to a resort called Isla de Corales for Christmas. The Heffleys went there because that was the place where Greg's mom and dad went for their honeymoon, much to Greg’s dismay. Little do his parents know that much of the resort is now geared toward adults rather than children. A vacation that is meant to be a tropical paradise turns out to be a complete nightmare with numerous mishaps for the Heffley family, much to Greg's expectation. An animated film based on the book will be released on December 4, 2026 for Disney+.

== Plot ==
Greg Heffley and his family see an advertisement for Isle de Corales, a resort where his parents went for their honeymoon, on TV. To Greg's dismay, they skip Christmas to go to the resort instead. After multiple mishaps at the airport, such as their flight being delayed, the Heffleys board the plane. Greg is disappointed that he has to sit in the coach class seats, and is more annoyed when he is seated between a different family with a baby.

After they land at the resort, Greg and his family find out that the resort has changed since his parents' honeymoon, and most of the activities they did are now on the adult-only section. In their room, they notice that they claimed the wrong suitcase and theirs was sent back home. After a visit to a crowded pool, Greg getting scared by an iguana, a meal being ruined by birds and slugs, and Frank getting diarrhea, the Heffleys go to sleep for the night. In the morning, Greg has an encounter with a tarantula that climbed into his slippers, and he loses track of where it went. He and his family go out to ride a banana boat because Susan wants to get a Christmas card photo, but the boat gets punctured.

The next day, Susan visits the spa, leaving Greg to take care of Manny. He lets Manny play at a water park, but ends up falling in water that he believes to be contaminated with urine. After this, Susan books a snorkeling trip for the family, but Greg worries about getting stung by a box jellyfish. He takes a gulp of water by accident and believes that he has swallowed a sea horse, ending the snorkeling trip early.

The Heffleys return to the pool, and Manny's box jellyfish, contained in a bucket, gets into the pool. During the commotion, Greg and his family sneak back into their room. The next day, Greg visits a tennis court, out of fear that the tarantula will reappear. The other kids recognize Greg as one of the people involved with the box jellyfish incident, so he is chased out of the court and runs back to his family in the hotel room.

Manny knocks over the suitcase, and his family tries on the clothes inside. They go out to eat at the golf clubhouse and play golf but are caught by security for having stolen another family's clothes and are ordered to leave the resort after giving them back. The Heffleys stay at the airport hotel, and the next day, Greg's parents choose to end things on a high note and sneak back in for a family picture. After taking the picture, the family split up and run off after being discovered by the family they stole clothes from, with Greg ending up in a nude beach on the adult side of the resort. He runs away and notices his family on the other side through a hole in the wall. The wall falls down while Rodrick tries to help Greg get back on the other side, and a lot of people rush in, letting the Heffleys escape the resort.

After he gets home, Greg visits the Isla de Corales website and finds that the resort is now appealing for information about his family's identities, meaning any chance of them ever returning to the resort is completely off the table.

== Reception ==
Since its release, it has received 4.5/5 stars on Waterstones with 786 reviews. Common Sense Media gave the book three out of five stars.

== Adaptation ==
An animated film adaptation was confirmed on July 30, 2025, and while first believed to be the immediate followup to 2023's Diary of a Wimpy Kid Christmas: Cabin Fever, it was revealed by the film's director Matt Danner that a different animated Wimpy Kid film would precede it and that the Getaway film scheduled release on December 4, 2026 as the first four movies were released in December.
