= Scott Franklin (producer) =

American film producer

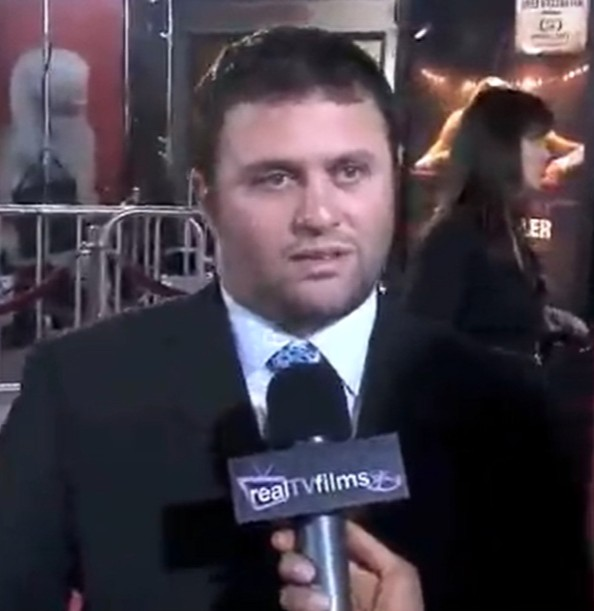
Franklin in 2008

Scott Franklin is an American film producer. Born and raised in New York, Franklin continues to work there as a producer with Darren Aronofsky at Protozoa Pictures. He is an Oscar nominee for his work on Black Swan and a two time recipient of the Independent Spirit Award for Best Picture.

== Early life ==
Franklin grew up in Bellmore, New York on Long Island where he wrestled at Kennedy High School. He continued his education at Ohio State University, where he studied Communications

== Career ==
After college, Franklin worked briefly in Los Angeles until he decided to return home to New York for an unpaid Associate Producer position on Pi. This collaboration initiated a long-time working relationship between Franklin and director Darren Aronofsky, for whom he produced five more films. Franklin has also developed and produced several other films at Protozoa Pictures, including Jackie and White Boy Rick.

== Filmography ==
Producer

- Pi (1998) (Associate Producer)
- Requiem for a Dream (2000) (Co-Producer)
- Hounddog (2007)
- The Wrestler (2008)
- Black Swan (2010)
- 2 Days in New York (2012)
- Noah (2014)
- Jackie (2016)
- Aftermath (2017)
- mother! (2017)
- White Boy Rick (2018)
- Tuscaloosa (2019)
- The Good Nurse (2022)

Executive Producer

- W.E. (2011)
- Zipper (2015)

== Honors ==
In 2009, Franklin won the Independent Spirit Award for Best Picture for his work on The Wrestler. He reprised the win two years later in 2011 for his work on Black Swan. Franklin's contribution to Black Swan also earned him an Academy Award nomination for Best Picture, a BAFTA nomination for Best Film, and a Golden Globe nomination for Best Motion Picture - Drama.

In 2017 Franklin was nominated for another Independent Spirit Award for Best Picture for his work on Jackie.
