= David Bowers (director) =

English animator, storyboard artist, film director, screenwriter and voice actor

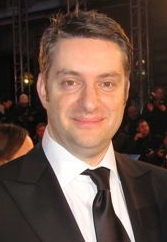
- Bowers at the 2006 BAFTAs in 2007
- Born: 1970 (age 55–56)
- Occupations: Animator, storyboard artist, film director, screenwriter, voice actor
- Years active: 1987–present

David Bowers (born 1970) is an English animator, storyboard artist, film director, screenwriter and voice actor.

== Early life ==
Bowers studied fine art at Chester School of Art and animation at West Surrey College of Art and Design. His first job was on Who Framed Roger Rabbit, as an inbetweener, under director Richard Williams.

== Career ==
After Roger Rabbit, Bowers worked at Cosgrove Hall on the cult favourite television shows Danger Mouse and Duckula before moving to London to work for Steven Spielberg's Amblimation studio. He worked as an animator on An American Tail: Fievel Goes West, before going freelance to work on advertisements and features. Bowers later returned to Amblimation, to work on early story development, and as a supervising animator on Balto.

With the closing of Amblimation, and the founding of DreamWorks Animation, Bowers moved to Glendale, California in 1997, to work as a story artist on The Prince of Egypt and The Road to El Dorado. It was during this period that he met Aardman's Nick Park and Peter Lord, who asked him to help storyboard Aardman's first feature length film, the critically acclaimed Chicken Run. He was ultimately credited as storyboard supervisor.

After Chicken Run, Bowers moved between Los Angeles and Bristol, working on several DreamWorks and Aardman projects, including the hit 3D animated comedy Shark Tale and the Oscar winning film from Wallace and Gromit, The Curse of the Were-Rabbit, before directing Aardman's first CGI feature, Flushed Away, with Sam Fell.

He wrote/directed a CGI adaptation of Osamu Tezuka's classic Astro Boy for Imagi Animation Studios and Summit Entertainment, that was released in October 2009. Bowers directed Diary of a Wimpy Kid: Rodrick Rules, his first live action film, which was released in cinemas on 25 March 2011.

He also directed the third film in the series, Diary of a Wimpy Kid: Dog Days (2012), as well as the fourth film, Diary of a Wimpy Kid: The Long Haul (2017). Bowers was developing a live action film adaptation of the popular Nickelodeon show, Rugrats for Paramount Pictures, under the production of Paramount Players in April 2019, for a January 2021 release, before being pulled from the schedule in November 2019.

== Filmography ==
Year	Title	Director	Writer	Executive Producer	Notes
2006	Flushed Away	Yes	No	No	Co-directed with Sam Fell; Also additional screenplay material and additional voices
2009	Astro Boy	Yes	Yes	No	Also voice of Mike the Fridge
2011	Diary of a Wimpy Kid: Rodrick Rules	Yes	No	No	
2012	Diary of a Wimpy Kid: Dog Days	Yes	No	No	
2017	Diary of a Wimpy Kid: The Long Haul	Yes	Yes	Yes	

Short films based on the film Astro Boy

Year	Title	Notes
2010	The RRF in New Recruit	Also voice of Mike the Fridge
2010	Astro Boy vs. The Junkyard Pirates	

Animator

- Count Duckula (1989) (1 episode)
- An American Tail: Fievel Goes West (1991)
- FernGully: The Last Rainforest (1992)
- Danger Mouse (1992) (4 episodes)
- We're Back! A Dinosaur's Story (1993)

Storyboard artist

Year	Title	Notes
1988	Who Framed Roger Rabbit	Inbetween artist
1995	Balto	Also supervising animator: "Rosy"
1998	The Prince of Egypt	Additional storyboard artist
2000	The Road to El Dorado	
2000	Chicken Run	
2004	Shark Tale	
2005	Wallace & Gromit: The Curse of the Were-Rabbit	Senior storyboard artist
