= Devon Bostick =

Canadian actor (born 1991)

- Bostick in 2025
- Born: November 13, 1991 (age 35); Toronto, Ontario, Canada
- Education: Etobicoke School of the Arts
- Occupation: Actor
- Years active: 1998–present

Devon Bostick (born November 13, 1991) is a Canadian actor. He is known for his main role as Rodrick Heffley in the Diary of a Wimpy Kid film series (2010–2012). His other lead roles include Adoration (2008), Dead Before Dawn 3D (2012), Okja (2017), and Tuscaloosa (2019). Bostick has also had a number of supporting roles in films such as Godsend (2004), Saw VI (2009), The Art of the Steal (2013), Regression (2015), Words on Bathroom Walls (2020), Oppenheimer (2023) and Mile End Kicks (2025).

In television, Bostick is known for his main role as Jasper Jordan on the CW science fiction series The 100 (2014–2017). He has also had recurring roles as Leo Strange in the CBC series Being Erica (2009–2011), Green on the Quibi series Most Dangerous Game (2020), and Oscar on the Netflix series FUBAR (2023).

== Early life and education ==
Bostick was born on November 13, 1991, in Toronto, Ontario. His Canadian mother, Stephanie Gorin, is a casting director in Toronto, and his American father, Joe Bostick, is an actor and film fight coordinator. He has a younger brother. Bostick is of English and Norwegian descent.

From grades 1 to 6, Bostick went to children's theatre camp. He began acting in the fifth grade and is a graduate of the Etobicoke School of the Arts in Toronto. He also took classes at Toronto's The Second City for four years, beginning in Grade 9.

== Career ==
Bostick has had roles in the television series Degrassi: The Next Generation, Flashpoint and in the film Citizen Duane, and appeared in the series premiere of Rookie Blue. His film work has included roles in Godsend, Fugitive Pieces and The Stone Angel.

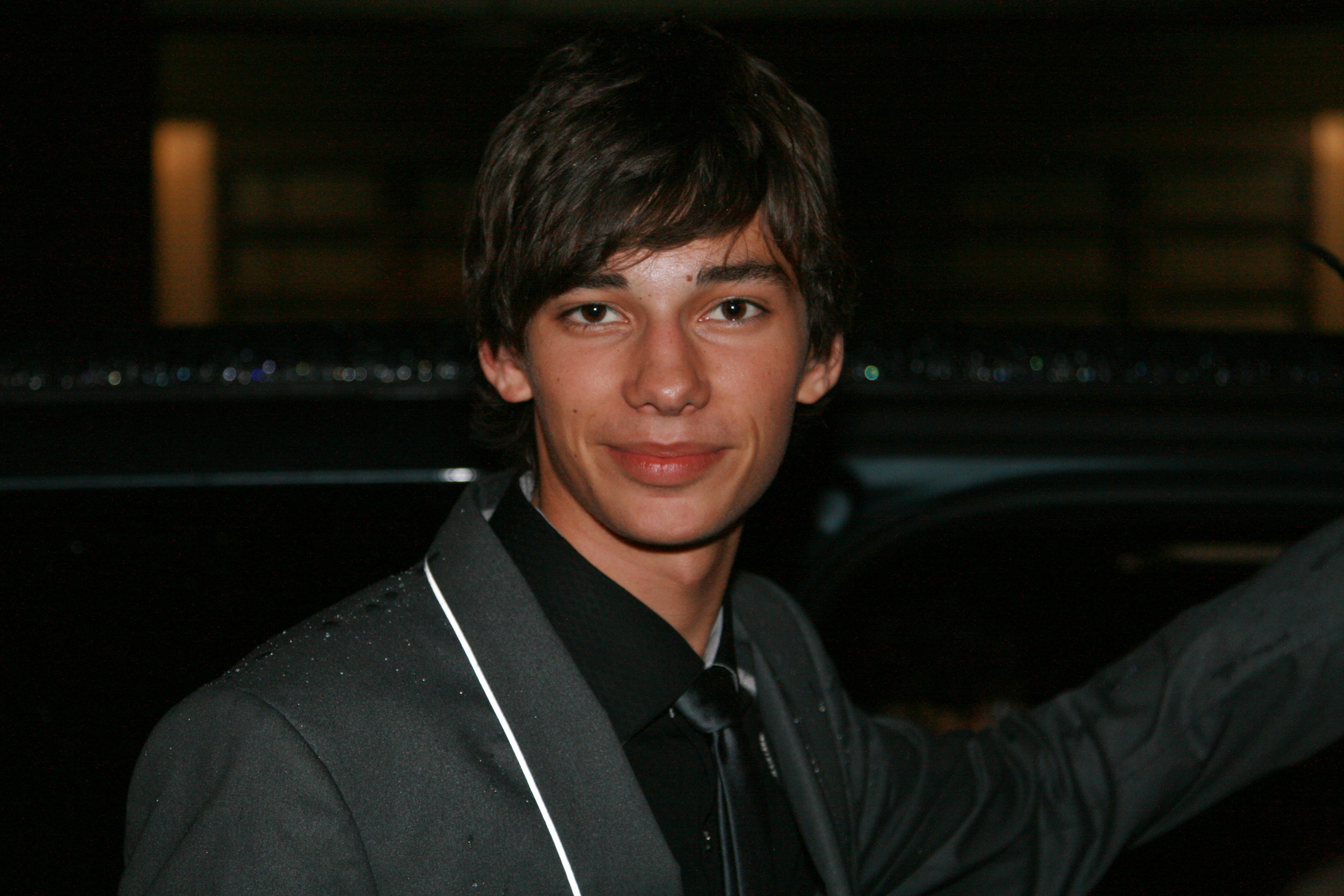
Bostick in 2008

In Adoration (2008), Bostick played Simon, a boy who being raised by his uncle (played by Scott Speedman) after his parents' death. He also appeared in an online spoof trailer for a hoax movie called "Ice Fortress." He had roles in The Poet, a World War II drama starring Roy Scheider and Colm Feore, Saw VI as Brent and Assassin's Creed: Lineage as Ezio Auditore.

Bostick also played Erica's deceased brother Leo in CBC Television's series Being Erica, and Rodrick Heffley in the Diary of a Wimpy Kid trilogy. He played Alan in three episodes of The Marvelous Mrs. Maisel. In Oppenheimer (2023), Bostick played Seth Neddermeyer, a physicist who worked at Los Alamos Laboratory during the Manhattan Project and suggested the use of an implosion-type nuclear weapon in the Trinity Test.

As of April 2026, Bostick is in production on an untitled film written by himself and Australian actor Cody Fern and starring Sarah Paulson, Dianne Wiest, and Naomi Watts.

== Personal life ==
Bostick lives in New York City.

== Filmography ==
Key
†	Denotes films that have not yet been released

=== Film ===
Year	Title	Role	Notes
2003	The Truth About the Head	Boy	
2004	Godsend	Zachary Clark Wells	
2005	Land of the Dead	Brian	
2006	King of Sorrow	Low Man	
2006	Aruba	Mark	
2006	Citizen Duane	Maurie Balfour	
2006	American Pie Presents: The Naked Mile	High school student #4	Direct-to-video
2007	The Poet	Guard #1	
2007	Finn's Girl		
2007	Fugitive Pieces	Teenager Ben	
2007	The Stone Angel	Young Marvin	
2007	Saw IV	Derek	Scenes cut
2008	Adoration	Simon	
2008	The Dreaming	Boy	
2009	Survival of the Dead	Boy	
2009	Saw VI	Brent	
2009	Assassin's Creed: Lineage	Ezio Auditore da Firenze	Short film
2010	Diary of a Wimpy Kid	Rodrick Heffley	
2010	The Long Autumn	Boy	Short film
2011	The Entitled	Dean Taylor	
2011	Hidden 3D	Lucas	
2011	The Sacrifice	Mike	Direct-to-video
2011	Diary of a Wimpy Kid: Rodrick Rules	Rodrick Heffley	
2012	Diary of a Wimpy Kid: Dog Days	Rodrick Heffley	
2012	Dead Before Dawn 3D	Casper Galloway	
2012	A Dark Truth	Renaldo	
2013	The Art of the Steal	Ponch	
2014	Small Time	Freddy Klein	
2015	Regression	Roy Gray	
2015	Being Charlie	Adam	
2017	Okja	Silver	
2019	Tuscaloosa	Billy	
2020	Pink Skies Ahead	Greg	
2020	Words on Bathroom Walls	Joaquin	
2023	Oppenheimer	Seth Neddermeyer	
2024	All That We Love	Nate	
2025	War of the Worlds	Mark Goodman	
2025	Mile End Kicks	Archie Webber	
2026	Crime 101	Devon	
2026	Closing Night	—	Writer only
2027	Alone at Dawn †	TBA	Post-production

=== Television ===
Year	Title	Role	Notes
1998	Exhibit A: Secrets of Forensic Science	Son	1 episode
2002– 2003	Odyssey 5	Gothic teen	2 episodes
2003	DC 9/11: Time of Crisis	Fireman's son	Television film
2003	Jake 2.0	Young kid	1 episode
2004	1-800-Missing	Zack	1 episode
2004	Hustle	The Kid	Television film
2005	Knights of the South Bronx	Darren	Television film
2006– 2007	Degrassi: The Next Generation	Nic	3 episodes
2007	Stump	Ryan	
2007	A Life Interrupted	Young Bobby	Television film
2007	The Altar Boy Gang	Terry	Television film
2008	Princess	Older boy	Television film
2008	Roxy Hunter and the Horrific Halloween	Drew	Television film
2009	The Good Germany	Dale Mackay	1 episode
2009	Guns	Boy #3	2 episodes
2009	The Border	Ali Jabir	1 episode
2009– 2011	Being Erica	Leo Strange	Recurring role (season 1); guest role (seasons 2–4)
2010	Rookie Blue	Martin Blentz	1 episode
2010	Flashpoint	Paul	1 episode
2010	Haven	Jimmy	1 episode
2011	She's the Mayor	Doctor Jimmy	1 episode
2011	The Listener	Bennie	1 episode
2013	Aim High	Marcus Anderson	Web series
2014– 2017	The 100	Jasper Jordan	Main role (season 1–4)
2019	Total Eclipse	Tyler Rotrovski	1 episode
2019	I Am the Night	Tommy	2 episodes
2019	The Marvelous Mrs. Maisel	Alan	3 episodes
2020	A Teacher	Ryan	Miniseries; 2 episodes
2020	Most Dangerous Game	Green	Recurring role
2021	Everything's Fine	Justin	3 episodes
2023	Fargo	Donald Ireland	1 episode
2023	FUBAR	Oscar	Recurring role
2025	The Studio	Miles	1 episode

=== Music videos ===
Year	Song	Artist	Director
2015	"Til It Happens to You"	Lady Gaga	Catherine Hardwicke
2016	"Emeralds"	Letts	Nicholaus Goossen

== Awards and nominations ==
Award	Year (Note: Where possible, the year is linked to the article for that particular ceremony.)	Category	Nominated work	Result	Ref.
Bare Bones International Film Festival	2021	Best Lead Actor	Tuscaloosa	Won	
Canadian Screen Awards	2026	Best Supporting Performance in a Comedy Film	Mile End Kicks	Nominated	
Cobb International Film Festival	2021	Best Lead in a Feature Film	Tuscaloosa	Won	
Las Vegas International Film and Screenwriting Festival	2020	Best Actor – Feature Film	Tuscaloosa	Nominated	
Prince of Prestige Academy Awards	2020	Best Performance by an Actor	Tuscaloosa	Won	
Twin Falls Sandwiches Film Festival	2020	Achievement in Acting	Tuscaloosa	Won	
Vancouver Film Critics Circle	2025	Best Supporting Actor in a Canadian Film	Mile End Kicks	Won	
Young Artist Awards	2008	Best Performance in a TV Movie, Miniseries or Special – Leading Young Actor	The Altar Boy Gang	Nominated	
Young Artist Awards	2010	Best Performance in a Feature Film – Leading Young Actor	Adoration	Nominated	
Young Artist Awards	2010	Best Performance in a TV Series – Recurring Young Actor 14 and Over	Being Erica	Nominated	
Young Artist Awards	2011	Best Performance in a Feature Film – Young Ensemble Cast	Diary of a Wimpy Kid	Won	
Young Artist Awards	2013	Best Performance in a Feature Film – Young Ensemble Cast	Diary of a Wimpy Kid: Dog Days	Won	
