= Diary of a Wimpy Kid: Dog Days (film) =

2012 film by David Bowers

- Theatrical release poster
- Directed by: David Bowers
- Screenplay by: Wallace Wolodarsky; Maya Forbes
- Based on: Diary of a Wimpy Kid: Dog Days and The Last Straw by Jeff Kinney
- Produced by: Nina Jacobson; Brad Simpson
- Starring: Zachary Gordon; Robert Capron; Devon Bostick; Rachael Harris; Steve Zahn
- Cinematography: Anthony B. Richmond
- Edited by: Troy Takaki
- Music by: Edward Shearmur
- Production companies: Fox 2000 Pictures; Color Force
- Distributed by: 20th Century Fox
- Release date: August 3, 2012
- Running time: 94 minutes
- Country: United States
- Language: English
- Budget: $22 million
- Box office: $77.2 million

Diary of a Wimpy Kid: Dog Days is a 2012 American comedy film directed by David Bowers from a screenplay by Wallace Wolodarsky and Maya Forbes. The third installment of the Diary of a Wimpy Kid film series and the final installment of the original live-action film trilogy, it stars Zachary Gordon, Robert Capron, Devon Bostick, Rachael Harris, and Steve Zahn who all reprise their roles. It follows Greg Heffley as his plans for summer vacation become hampered.

The film is based on the fourth and third books of the Diary of a Wimpy Kid book series, Dog Days and The Last Straw, respectively. Greg's interactions with Holly Hills and scenes involving Spag Union are featured in the former, while the majority of it is based on the latter.

The film was released by 20th Century Fox on August 3, grossing $77 million at the box office and, like its predecessors, received mixed reviews. It is the last in the series to feature the original cast members, as many of them (such as Gordon, Capron, and Bostick) outgrew their roles, and new actors were cast for the next installment, Diary of a Wimpy Kid: The Long Haul, which was released on May 19, 2017.

== Plot ==
Visiting the local public pool with summer vacation starting, the Heffleys run into Lenwood Heath, a reformed delinquent friend of Rodrick's who works as a lifeguard there. He attends Spag Union, a strict disciplinarian military school that begins in the eighth grade. Frank notices that Greg is about to start that grade and considers signing him up. After learning that Greg spent his entire first day playing video games, Frank revokes this privilege, leading to Susan urging him to spend more time with him; he attempts to do so, but Greg's indifference annoys him.

Rowley invites Greg to the local country club. Initially reluctant, he joins Rowley and discovers that his crush, Holly Hills, teaches tennis there. After Rodrick learns that her elder sister, Heather, whom he has a crush on, works there too, he asks Greg to help him sneak in. Frank surprises Greg with a non-paying summer internship at his job, hoping they can bond. Disliking the idea, Greg lies about having received a job at the club, to Frank and Susan's delight.

Rowley invites Greg on a family trip to a rented beach house near the boardwalk. Before they leave, Frank and Susan give Greg an impractical starter mobile phone that only allows him to call home or 911. He becomes increasingly creeped out by how close the Jeffersons are and secretly uses their laptop to email Susan into rescuing him. They become suspicious after he inadvertently sends the email to everyone on the contact list; he desperately tries to call home using his new phone, but ends up accidentally calling 911 instead, leading to Rowley's father nearly being arrested when he absentmindedly answers the door with a knife in his hand. Greg is sent home early, and Frank starts to see Rowley as a bad influence.

A few days later, Rowley tells Greg that he is no longer allowed to invite him to the club, but he constantly sneaks in by impersonating members. They eventually reconcile as Greg gets Löded Diper a gig for Heather's upcoming sweet sixteen, to Rodrick's delight. During another visit, Rowley's father confronts Frank and Greg over the latter's reckless smoothie purchasing. Learning the truth about his deception, Frank expresses his disappointment with him. Shortly after, Rodrick reveals to him that a Spag Union disc has been mailed to them, to his horror.

Rodrick urges Greg to go on a camping trip for "Wilderness Explorers" with his classmates to impress Frank. During it, after overhearing Frank's superior, Stan Warren, insult him over his lack of camping skills, Greg sets a trap with his friends and sneaks into Stan's tent, where he discovers that their troop has been secretly using household appliances. Stan discovers Greg and insults him, but Frank soon chastises him for faking his camping skills before he runs into Greg's trap, humiliating himself. At a motel on the way home, Frank admits he never liked camping and decides not to send Greg to Spag Union, to his surprise and delight. He also talks to him about learning from mistakes and taking responsibility, making them both realize they are more alike than they think.

At Heather's sweet sixteen a few days later, Löded Diper performs with Rodrick on lead vocals to try and serenade her. The performance soon goes awry as a disgusted Heather attempts to assault him, ending the party in disaster even though Holly enjoyed it. She and Greg hold hands, and they spend the rest of the summer together with Rowley and the rest of the Heffleys.

== Cast ==
- Zachary Gordon as Greg Heffley
- Steve Zahn as Frank Heffley, Greg's father
- Robert Capron as Rowley Jefferson, Greg's best friend
- Devon Bostick as Rodrick Heffley, Greg's elder brother
- Rachael Harris as Susan Heffley, Greg's mother
- Peyton List as Holly Hills, Greg's crush
- Grayson Russell as Fregley, a friend of Greg's
- Karan Brar as Chirag Gupta, one of Greg's friends
- Laine MacNeil as Patty Farrell, Greg's arch-enemy
- Bryce Hodgson as Ben, one of Rodrick's friends
- Connor and Owen Fielding as Manny Heffley, Greg's younger brother
- Melissa Roxburgh as Heather Hills, Holly's elder sister and Rodrick's crush
- Phillip Maurice Hayes as Stan Warren, the Heffleys' neighbor and Frank's superior at "Wilderness Explorers"
- Alf Humphreys as Robert Jefferson, Rowley's father
- Bronwen Smith as Linda Jefferson, Rowley's mother
- Terence Kelly as Grandpa Heffley, Susan's father-in-law, Frank's father and their children's paternal grandfather
- Tom Stevens as Lenwood Heath, a lifeguard in the local pool
- John Shaw as Mr. Draybick, a history teacher at Greg's school
- Andrew McNee as Coach Malone, Greg's gym teacher
- Dalila Bela as Taylor Pringle
- Elise Gatien as Madison, Heather's best friend
- Frank C. Turner as Troopmaster Barrett, the scoutmaster of Troop 133 at "Wilderness Explorers"

Jeff Kinney, the author of the series, reprises his role from the previous film as Mr. Hills, Holly and Heather's dad.

== Production ==
Diary of a Wimpy Kid: Dog Days was produced on a budget of $22 million. Principal photography began on August 8, 2011, in Vancouver and was completed on October 7, 2011. The location for the country club pool was the Eagle Ridge Pool in Coquitlam, British Columbia. Filming there took place during the end of August 2011. The municipal pool scenes at the beginning and the end of the movie were filmed at Steveston Pool in Richmond, BC. Filming occurred there during the beginning of September 2011. The Chinese Bunkhouse at the Steveston Shipyards in Richmond was the location of the Wilderness Explorers cabin for Troop 133. During filming, stars Zachary Gordon and Robert Capron, were seen riding the Corkscrew at Playland at Vancouver's fair, the PNE. Capron had to wear a wig for the film, as his hair was shaved to play the role of the young Curly Howard in The Three Stooges, as explained in The Wimpy Kid Movie Diary book. A poster was leaked in March 2012. A teaser trailer was attached to The Three Stooges. An advance screening for the film was held on July 31, 2012. Dune Entertainment financed the film.

== Release ==
Dog Days was released in U.S. theaters on August 3, 2012. The film was released on iTunes on December 4, 2012 and on DVD and Blu-ray in the United States on December 18, 2012.

An animated short film set after the events of the film, Diary of a Wimpy Kid: Class Clown, was released on the home media release of it, with Zachary Gordon reprising his role as Greg Heffley, and audio of various other cast members from the film covering it.

== Reception ==
=== Box office ===
The film grossed $49,008,662 in the U.S. and Canada, and $28,221,033 in other territories, for a total gross of $77,229,695, becoming the most commercially successful film in the series.

The film grossed $14,623,599 in its opening weekend in 3,391 theaters. It later expanded to 3,401 theaters in its second weekend, where it grossed $8,002,166.

=== Critical response ===
On the review aggregator website Rotten Tomatoes, 52% of 73 critics' reviews are positive. The website's consensus reads: "Overly familiar and a bit too reliant on slapstick, the sitcom-like Dog Days fails to improve upon previous installments and will likely appeal to few outside its target audience." Metacritic, which uses a weighted average, assigned the film a score of 54 out of 100, based on 22 critics, indicating "mixed or average" reviews. Audiences polled by CinemaScore gave the film an average grade of "A−" on an A+ to F scale, the same grade as the two previous films.

Abby West of Entertainment Weekly gave the film a B+ and wrote, "Though often self-centered and conniving, Greg remains a likable kid, and the movie entertains by pulling off over-the-top scenarios that set up digestible life lessons for youngsters." OregonLive.com praised Zachary Gordon's acting, writing, "[h]is easy likeability and general relatability are perhaps two of the biggest keys to Diary of a Wimpy Kid: Dog Days."

Matt Mueller of OnMilwaukee gave the film a negative review, calling it "manic, forced, predictable, scatterbrained and often times unpleasant." He criticized its "overstuffed screenplay" for being "very attention-deficit, cramming in numerous wacky plot elements, most of them solely existing for predictable jokes that were met in my screening with interminable silence." He wrote that "[s]ome of the storylines could've made for decent movies on their own," particularly the one where Greg joins the Boy Scouts, but that they were only brought back "when the screenplay needs another forced comic set piece or ill-fated attempt at wringing unearned emotion." He disliked Greg's behavior, writing "He's lazy and wildly selfish, taking advantage of his friend's unbridled kindness. His trip with the Jeffersons ends with Greg insulting the entire family and getting Robert arrested by the police. Later in the film, he runs up their bill sneaking into the country club. What part of this behavior is charming?" The review concludes with Mueller writing, "In Dog Days' lone earnest moment, Rowley astutely explains that his parents' disappointment is worse than their yelling. In that case, I'm not angry that a movie like this can take the joys of childhood and make them so joyless and unpleasant. I'm disappointed."

=== Accolades ===
Award	Date of ceremony	Category	Recipient(s)	Result	Ref.
Nickelodeon Kids' Choice Awards	March 23, 2013	Favorite Movie	Diary of a Wimpy Kid: Dog Days	Nominated	
Nickelodeon Kids' Choice Awards	March 23, 2013	Favorite Movie Actor	Zachary Gordon	Nominated	
Young Artist Awards	May 5, 2013	Best Performance in a Feature Film - Leading Young Actor	Zachary Gordon	Nominated	
Young Artist Awards	May 5, 2013	Best Performance in a Feature Film - Supporting Young Actor	Robert Capron	Won	
Young Artist Awards	May 5, 2013	Best Performance in a Feature Film - Supporting Young Actor	Karan Brar	Nominated	
Young Artist Awards	May 5, 2013	Best Performance in a Feature Film - Supporting Young Actress	Laine MacNeil	Nominated	
Young Artist Awards	May 5, 2013	Best Performance in a Feature Film - Supporting Young Actor Ten and Under	Connor & Owen Fielding	Nominated	
Young Artist Awards	May 5, 2013	Best Performance in a Feature Film - Supporting Young Actor Ten and Under	Dalila Bela	Nominated	
Young Artist Awards	May 5, 2013	Best Performance in a Feature Film - Young Ensemble Cast	Zachary Gordon, Robert Capron, Peyton List, Karan Brar, Laine MacNeil, Connor & Owen Fielding, Devon Bostick, Grayson Russell	Won	

== Future ==
=== Standalone sequel ===
At the time of its release, the film was described as the last live-action one in the franchise. In August 2012, while doing press for the film, Gordon, Capron, and Diary of a Wimpy Kid creator Jeff Kinney each indicated that there were no plans for more films, but did not dismiss the possibility entirely. Kinney replied to inquiries regarding the possibility of another sequel, stating, "At present, we don’t have a fourth film in development, but you never know!"

And when describing the likelihood of starring in more films in the series, Gordon explained, "[Dog Days] most likely will be the last movie. The main problem is [the cast is] getting older. You can't stop it. There's no way to temporarily stop us from changing and growing up. You know, that's the problem because the characters are supposed to be timeless." In March 2013, he stated in a Spreecast live stream that there would not be any more live-action films. Jeff Kinney had indicated that instead of doing a live-action film of the sixth novel Diary of a Wimpy Kid: Cabin Fever, he would like to see it adapted into an animated one, stating in an interview, "I hope that it gets made into an animated movie. I'd really like to see it turn into an animated television special."

On July 29, 2016, it was announced that a new film with a different cast based on the ninth book, Diary of a Wimpy Kid: The Long Haul, had begun production. The Long Haul film was released on May 19, 2017, to a modest box-office success and a critical low for the franchise.

=== Animated film series ===
On December 10, 2020, it was announced on Disney Investors Day that an animated film based on the books would premiere on Disney+ sometime in 2021. It will be another reboot, and will be computer-animated, along with any other future Wimpy Kid movies. The first animated film was released on December 3, 2021.
