= Tuscaloosa (film) =

2019 film by Philip Harder

- Teaser poster
- Directed by: Philip Harder
- Written by: Philip Harder
- Based on: Tuscaloosa by W. Glasgow Phillips
- Produced by: Scott Franklin; Patrick Riley
- Starring: Devon Bostick; Natalia Dyer
- Cinematography: Theo Stanley
- Edited by: Clayton Condit
- Music by: Matt Hutchinson; Joshua Mosley
- Production company: Garlin Pictures
- Distributed by: Cinedigm
- Release dates: October 5, 2019 (Nashville); March 13, 2020 (United States)
- Country: United States
- Language: English

Tuscaloosa is a 2019 American drama film directed by Philip Harder (in his feature film directorial debut), and starring Devon Bostick and Natalia Dyer. It is based on the 1994 novel of the same name by W. Glasgow Phillips.

== Plot ==
Billy Mitchell, a recent college graduate, falls in love with Virginia, a patient at his father's mental institution just after the civil rights movement, in Tuscaloosa, Alabama. Mitchell and his best friend Nigel, who is black, fight against the racist cops and other authorities. Mitchell is torn between helping his slightly crazy girlfriend escape, maintaining a friendship with his childhood friend, and making his successful father proud of him.

== Cast ==
- Natalia Dyer as Virginia
- Tate Donovan as Doctor
- Devon Bostick as Billy
- Marchánt Davis as Nigel
- Nathan Phillips as Deputy
- Bruce Bohme as Papa
- YG as Antoine
- Paul Cram as Earl
- John Murray as Orderly

== Production ==
The film was shot entirely in the state of Minnesota, with a number of scenes taking place at Carleton College and some at and around director Philip Harder's home. Harder first read the novel in the late 1990s and was immediately interested in directing a film adaptation. He approached Pixel Farm, a Minneapolis-based visual effects company that Harder had worked with regularly on music videos and commercials, to create the movie. Production was set to begin around the late 2000s, with a $3.4 million budget and Thora Birch in talks to star. The 2008 financial crisis delayed production and Harder was unable to get the funding necessary for the film.

Patrick Riley, one of the film's producers, was a neighbor of Harder. After getting to know him, he decided to help fund the movie. Most of the film was shot in two weeks in the fall of 2017.

== Reception ==
The film has a 58% rating on Rotten Tomatoes based on 12 critic reviews. Brian Shaer of Film Threat gave it an eight out of ten. It has an average score of 3.3/5 on Letterboxd.
