= Terence Kelly (actor) =

Canadian actor

- Born: Terence Reginald Kelly; 1944 (age 81–82); Toronto, Ontario, Canada
- Occupation: Actor
- Years active: 1963–present

Terence Kelly (born 1944) is a Canadian film, television and stage actor.

== Education ==
Kelly is an early graduate of the National Theatre School of Canada.

== Career ==
Kelly work worked artistic director of the White Rock Summer Theatre in White Rock, British Columbia.

He also had recurring roles in The Beachcombers, The Odyssey, Higher Ground, Tom Stone, Da Vinci's Inquest and Da Vinci's City Hall, made guest appearances on The X-Files, Bordertown, Mom P.I., Neon Rider, The Commish and 21 Jump Street. He also appeared in the films Beyond the Stars, The Mermaid Chair, Jane's House, Chautauqua Girl,The Sisterhood of the Traveling Pants and Finding Father Christmas.

In 1987, for his roles as RCMP officer Sgt. Wilkes in Red Serge, he was nominated for a Gemini Award in the Best Actor in a Dramatic Program or Mini-Series category at the 2nd Gemini Awards. He played Grandpa Heffley in the Diary of a Wimpy Kid series.

== Filmography ==
=== Film ===
Year	Title	Role	Notes
1971	McCabe & Mrs. Miller	Quigley	
1974	Christina	Passport Officer	
1979	A Man, a Woman, and a Bank	Bank Manager	
1980	The Changeling	Sergeant Durban	
1983	Star 80	Charlie	
1983	The Golden Seal	Mongo	
1984	Chautauqua Girl	Neil McCallum	
1987	American Gothic	Psychiatrist	
1989	Beyond the Stars	Al Fletcher	
1997	Mr. Magoo	McManus	
1998	Firestorm	Lawyer	
1999	The Silencer	Neal Donovan	
2000	Trixie	Mr. Lang	
2003	Agent Cody Banks	Dog Walker	
2004	Walking Tall	Judge L. Powell	
2005	The Sisterhood of the Traveling Pants	Wedding Minister	
2005	The Exorcism of Emily Rose	Medical Examiner	
2006	Catch and Release	Mr. Wheeler	
2007	In the Name of the King	Trumaine	
2007	Married Life	Dr. Anderson	
2009	Watchmen	General West	
2011	Diary of a Wimpy Kid: Rodrick Rules	Grandpa	
2011	The Big Year	Pete Shackelford	
2012	In Their Skin	Attendant	
2012	Diary of a Wimpy Kid: Dog Days	Grandpa Heffley	
2018	Boundaries	Gruff Board Member	
2020	Sonic the Hedgehog	Farmer Zimmer	

=== Television ===
Year	Title	Role	Notes
1970	The Manipulators	Len Parr	Episode: "One and One Makes Four"
1973–1977	The Beachcombers		4 episodes
1982	A Piano for Mrs. Cimino	Mr. Emory	Television film
1983	The Accident	Mr. Novak	Television film
1984	The Other Kingdom	Jeff Andrews	Television film
1985	Danger Bay	Spence	Episode: "Katie and the Whale"
1986	Brothers by Choice	The Father	Television film
1987	Deadly Deception	Bank officer	Television film
1987	Sworn to Silence	Sergeant Phelps	Television film
1987	Airwolf	Longfellow	Episode: "Flying Home"
1987	J.J. Starbuck	Lt. Hart	Episode: "A Killing in the Market"
1988	MacGyver	Brosz	Episode: "The Odd Triple"
1989	Unsub	Captain Miller	Episode: "White Bone Demon"
1990	Mom P.I.	Peter Town	Episode: "Career Moves"
1990	It	Officer Nell	TV miniseries
1990	21 Jump Street	Various roles	3 episodes
1990	Neon Rider	Mr. Phillip Cunningham	Episode: "Over the Line"
1991	Bordertown	Marshall Lee Ford	Episode: "Marshal Law"
1991	And the Sea Will Tell	Wheeler	Television film
1991	The Commish	Principal Hearst	Episode: "Nothing to Fear But Fear..."
1992	Child of Rage	Mike	Television film
1992	The Odyssey	Dr. Rappaport	3 episodes
1993	Street Justice	Kemp	Episode: "Obsession"
1993	RiffTrax: Silent Rage	Medical Examiner	Television film
1993	The X-Files	George Usher	Episode: "Squeeze"
1993	Final Appeal	Lefcourt	Television film
1993	A Stranger in the Mirror	Eddie Barrigan	Television film
1993	The Hat Squad	Mr. Benton	Episode: "Frankie Stein"
1994	Jane's House	Judge	Television film
1995	The Marshal	Captain Lou Sparks	Episode: "Buy Hard"
1995	Jack Reed: One of Our Own	Pete Myers	Television film
1996	Strange Luck	Mr. Murphy	Episode: "Wrong Number"
1996	Captains Courageous	Ted the Foul Up	Television film
1996	Poltergeist: The Legacy	Mr. Klein	Episode: "The Substitute"
1996	Two	Judge Daniel McAllister	Episode: "A.D."
1996	Titanic	Arthur Rostron	2 episodes
1996, 1998	Millennium	Dad / Detective Kerney	2 episodes
1997	Trucks	Ill-fated Mailman	Television film
1997	Viper	Johnny	Episode: "First Mob Wives Club"
1997, 1998	The Outer Limits	General / Oscar Reynolds	2 episodes
1998	The Hunted	Griffin	Television film
1998	Cold Squad	Francis Abbot	Episode: "Tess"
1998	The Wonderful World of Disney	Charles L. Birch	Episode: "Goldrush: A Real Life Alaskan Adventure"
1998	The Spree	Captain Richie	Television film
1998	The Crow: Stairway to Heaven	Preacher Morgan	Episode: "Before I Wake"
1998–2004	Da Vinci's Inquest	Various roles	4 episodes
1999	So Weird	Grandpa Colin	Episode: "Banshee"
1999	Y2K	Roy Jenkins	Television film
2000	Higher Ground	Mr. Scarbrow	3 episodes
2000	First Target	Clay	Television film
2000	First Wave	Keenan	Episode: "Legacy"
2001	Night Visions	Pastor James	Episode: "Rest Stop/After Life"
2002	Strange World	Eric Brooks	Episode: "The Devil Still Holds My Hand"
2002	L.A. Law: The Movie	Judge Richard Faraday	Television film
2002	Breaking News	David Walker	Episode: "I24 Gate"
2002–2003	Tom Stone	Sweater Man	8 episodes
2003	The Unauthorized Story of Three's Company	Norman Fell	Television film
2003	Dead Like Me	Patrick Cassidy	Episode: "Reaping Havoc"
2003	Peacemakers	Banker Horace Trico	Episode: "Pilot"
2003	Stargate SG-1	Miles Hagan	Episode: "Space Race"
2004	Touching Evil	Hinks' Lawyer	Television film
2004	The Days	Hal Sherman	2 episodes
2004	Smallville	Prison Doctor	Episode: "Transference"
2004	Pryor Offenses	Judge	Television film
2005	Stargate Atlantis	Orin	Episode: "Letters from Pegasus"
2005	The L Word	Phil	Episode: "Labyrinth"
2005–2006	Da Vinci's City Hall	Fire Chief Ed Welles	6 episodes
2006	A Little Thing Called Murder	Elmer Holmgren	Television film
2006	The Dead Zone	Congressman Kelly	Episode: "Forbidden Fruit"
2006	The Mermaid Chair	Dom Anthony	Television film
2006, 2008	Supernatural	Doctor / Daniel Elkins	2 episodes
2007	Masters of Science Fiction	Goldstone	Episode: "A Clean Escape"
2007	Eureka	Charlie	Episode: "Family Reunion"
2007	Psych	Professor Enrico	Episode: "If You're So Smart, Then Why Are You Dead?"
2007	Kyle XY	Eli	Episode: "Leap of Faith"
2008	Fear Itself	Reverend	Episode: "Family Man"
2008	Gym Teacher: The Movie	Doctor	Television film
2009	Impact	Hugh	Episode #1.2
2009	Harper's Island	Reverend Fain	Episode: "Crackle"
2009	Caprica	Mayor	Episode: "Pilot"
2009	Angel and the Bad Man	Thomas	Television film
2009	Beyond Sherwood Forest	Fitzwater	Television film
2010	Hiccups	Uncle Dave	Episode: "Dream Gig"
2011	Fairly Legal	Marty Fliegel	Episode: "Pilot"
2011	Goodnight for Justice	Store Owner	Episode: "Goodnight for Justice"
2012	The Haunting Hour: The Series	Gramps	Episode: "The Return of Lilly D"
2012	Rags	Troy	Television film
2013	Window Wonderland	Mac McGuire	Television film
2015	Love, Again	Walter	Television film
2015	iZombie	Wendell Gale	Episode: "Grumpy Old Liv"
2015	Wish Upon a Christmas	Ben	Television film
2016	Bates Motel	Dickie Bolton	5 episodes
2016	Finding Father Christmas	Rick Torrance	Television film
2016	When Calls the Heart	Sam Bailey	Episode: "A When Calls the Heart Christmas"
2017	Aurora Teagarden Mysteries	Mr. Walker	Episode: "A Bundle of Trouble: An Aurora Teagarden Mystery"
2017	The Christmas Train	Higgins	Television film
2018	Christmas Lost and Found	Shep	Television film
2019	Picture a Perfect Christmas	Simon Baylock	Television film
2019	A Doggone Christmas	Doug Davies	Television film
2020	Love in Store	Al	Television film
2020	The Magicians	Clarence	Episode: "Purgatory"
2020	A Glenbrooke Christmas	Wyatt Mooney	Television film
2020	Loudermilk	Very Old Barber	Episode: "Should Have Known Better"
TBA	The Picture of Christmas	Jack Hart	Television film
