= Diary of a Wimpy Kid: Double Down =

2016 book by Jeff Kinney

- Illustrator: Jeff Kinney
- Language: English
- Series: Diary of a Wimpy Kid
- Genre: Children's novel Graphic Novel
- Publisher: Amulet Books (US); Puffin Books (UK)
- Publication date: November 1, 2016 (worldwide); January 25, 2018 (paperback re-issue)
- Publication place: United States
- Media type: Print (hardcover, paperback)
- Pages: 217 story pages (224 altogether)
- ISBN: 978-1-4197-2344-5
- Preceded by: Old School
- Followed by: The Getaway

Diary of a Wimpy Kid: Double Down is the eleventh book in the Diary of a Wimpy Kid series by Jeff Kinney. The book was unveiled during the 2016 Diary of a Wimpy Kid Virtually Live Event. The book was published on November 1, 2016.

== Plot ==
Greg Heffley talks about how he thinks his life is a reality TV show and that everyone in his life is an actor. Later, Greg's mother, Susan, gives him money for the school book fair but ends up disappointed when he buys toys instead of books, because she believes that Greg can discover new creative talents. Greg doubts this, recalling times he tried writing poems and failed an advanced placement test. He returns to the book fair to buy Spineticklers horror books, reminding him of Halloween coming.

Wanting Halloween candy, Greg enters a contest at school in which students release balloons with letters attached, and the student whose balloon goes the farthest wins a jar of candy corn. Most of the balloons released crash into a brand new radio tower, but Greg's balloon rises slower due to his heavy letter and continues on. As Greg and Susan make a new reading list, his balloon is found by a boy named Maddox, who lives in the next town over, whom Susan thinks could be a good role model for him. During a playdate at Maddox's house, Greg retrieves his balloon, and realizes that Maddox is very sheltered and not allowed to use electronics; he spends his time either playing with Legos or practicing his violin. Soon, Maddox accuses Greg of stealing one of his Lego pieces, and the playdate dissapointingly ends. At school, Greg turns in his balloon and wins the candy corn, which is found and eaten by the family's pet pig.

Greg joins the school band to get invited to Mariana Mendoza's Halloween party, choosing a French horn, but he soon finds out only the woodwind section of the band was invited. Greg goes with his friend Rowley, who plays the flute, and they go to the party as a two-headed monster. Susan also attends the party and sets up party games, which all the attendees enjoy. After the party, Greg thinks about quitting the French horn, but Frank tells him he will watch him play in the Fall Concert. The day of concert, on his way to the stage, another kid in the band named Jake McGough purposely gives Greg a flat tire, and when he fixes his shoe, he gets locked in the room. Greg gets grounded by Frank as he thought Greg backed out and decided to waste time by goofing off instead of performing.

At home, Greg finds an off-limits bag of chocolate chips and realizes that he will get in trouble after eating them. He calls Rowley and asks him to bring over chocolate chips, but they melt and leave a mess. While going to get paper towels, he finds gummy worms and comes up with the idea to make a horror movie called Night of the Night Crawlers.

Greg and Rowley write and film the opening of the movie. After Greg spreads gummy worms in the yard for a scene, he sees the family pig eating the gummy worms in the house. Rowley notices a flock of geese in the yard, so to scare them off, Greg and Rowley try to get a Halloween wolf mask from the basement, but they accidentally set off a noisy plastic witch mentioned earlier in the book, and the cabinet falls on top of them after Rowley gets startled. Rowley sprints out of the house and climbs up a tree, and Greg's dad comes home. Weeks later, while Greg was forced to sort and clean the fallen cabinet, Rowley gains fame from the local news after the incident, to Greg's annoyance, so he had rejected any statements that he had made at the start of the book regarding fame.

== Development ==
In an interview, Kinney stated, "After the 10th book, I found myself at a crossroads in my career. I wasn’t sure if I should continue writing Diary of a Wimpy Kid books or go down a different path. Double Down is really special to me, because it reflects a renewed commitment to the series and a plan for the future."

== Reception ==
Rachel Chipman of the Deseret News wrote that the book would "probably not attract any new fans", while longtime fans of the Diary of a Wimpy Kid series would "adore [Greg's] Halloween middle school adventures". Carrie R. Wheadon of Common Sense Media wrote that "when Kinney sticks to his Halloween theme, the story feels fresh and holds together well. When he veers to strange flashbacks about piano lessons and speech class, it feels more like filler." A Booklist review states, "though Greg’s clever ideas backfire more often than not, this just fuels the fun. Readers are definitely in for a treat with Kinney’s latest." However, many fans of the series criticized Double Down for having an inconsistent plot, and the advertised movie-making plot not happening until the end of the book.

== Sales ==
The book topped USA Today's bestselling books list 8 days after publication. It was the 11th book in the Diary of a Wimpy Kid series to do so. Double Down was the second-best print bestseller of 2016, having sold 1,135,249 copies.
