= Zachary Gordon =

American actor (born 1998)

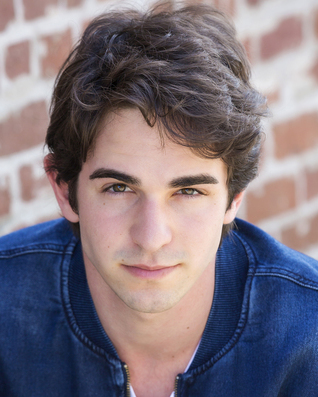
- Gordon in 2018
- Born: Zachary Adam Gordon; February 15, 1998 (age 28); Oak Park, California, U.S.
- Education: Oak Park High School
- Occupations: Actor; singer
- Years active: 2006–present

Zachary Adam Gordon (born February 15, 1998) is an American actor and singer. He played the lead role of Greg Heffley in the Diary of a Wimpy Kid film series (2010–2012), which earned him nominations for a Kids' Choice Award and seven Young Artist Awards. His other lead film roles include Huevos: Little Rooster's Egg-cellent Adventure (2016) and Dreamcatcher (2021). He has had supporting roles in films such as Georgia Rule (2007), Madagascar: Escape 2 Africa (2008), The Incredible Burt Wonderstone (2013), American Pie Presents: Girls' Rules (2020), and Violet (2021).

In television, Gordon had a lead voice role as Gil on the Nickelodeon series Bubble Guppies (2011). His live-action recurring roles include Jason Cohen on the Freeform series Dead of Summer (2016), and Tate Wilson on the Freeform drama series Good Trouble (2019–2020).

== Early and personal life ==
Gordon was born in Oak Park, California, to Linda and Kenneth Gordon. He has two older brothers and was raised in Southern California. Gordon graduated from Oak Park High School in his hometown. He is Jewish, with his grandparents having survived the Holocaust.

In May 2023, Gordon lost his voice due to torn muscles in his throat, causing his acting career to be put on hold.

== Career ==
Gordon has made multiple television appearances on How I Met Your Mother and All of Us. He also appeared in the 2008 pilot of Desperate Housewives, plus two other episodes, and in two episodes of 24 that aired in January 2009. Gordon appeared in three episodes as a guest star on Last Man Standing, where he played Mike Baxter's daughter's boyfriend.

Gordon's film credits include Sex and Death 101, Lower Learning, the Garry Marshall film Georgia Rule (for which he won the Young Artist Award for his portrayal of Ethan), The Brothers Bloom, as young Bloom, and in National Treasure: Book of Secrets.

Gordon has been credited with voice over roles including Brad Spolyt in The Chubbchubbs Save Xmas, Ricky Garcia in Project Gilroy, San San in Nick Jr.'s Ni Hao, Kai-Lan and The Mighty B! He was a series regular as the original voice of Gil in the Nickelodeon series Bubble Guppies.

Gordon had voice cameo roles as Baby Melman in the animated film Madagascar: Escape 2 Africa, Kotaro in Afro Samurai: Resurrection, and young Tony Stark in The Super Hero Squad Show. In 2010, he played Greg Heffley in the film Diary of a Wimpy Kid. In 2011, he voiced Papi Jr. in Beverly Hills Chihuahua 2 and as Paws in Disney's The Search for Santa Paws.

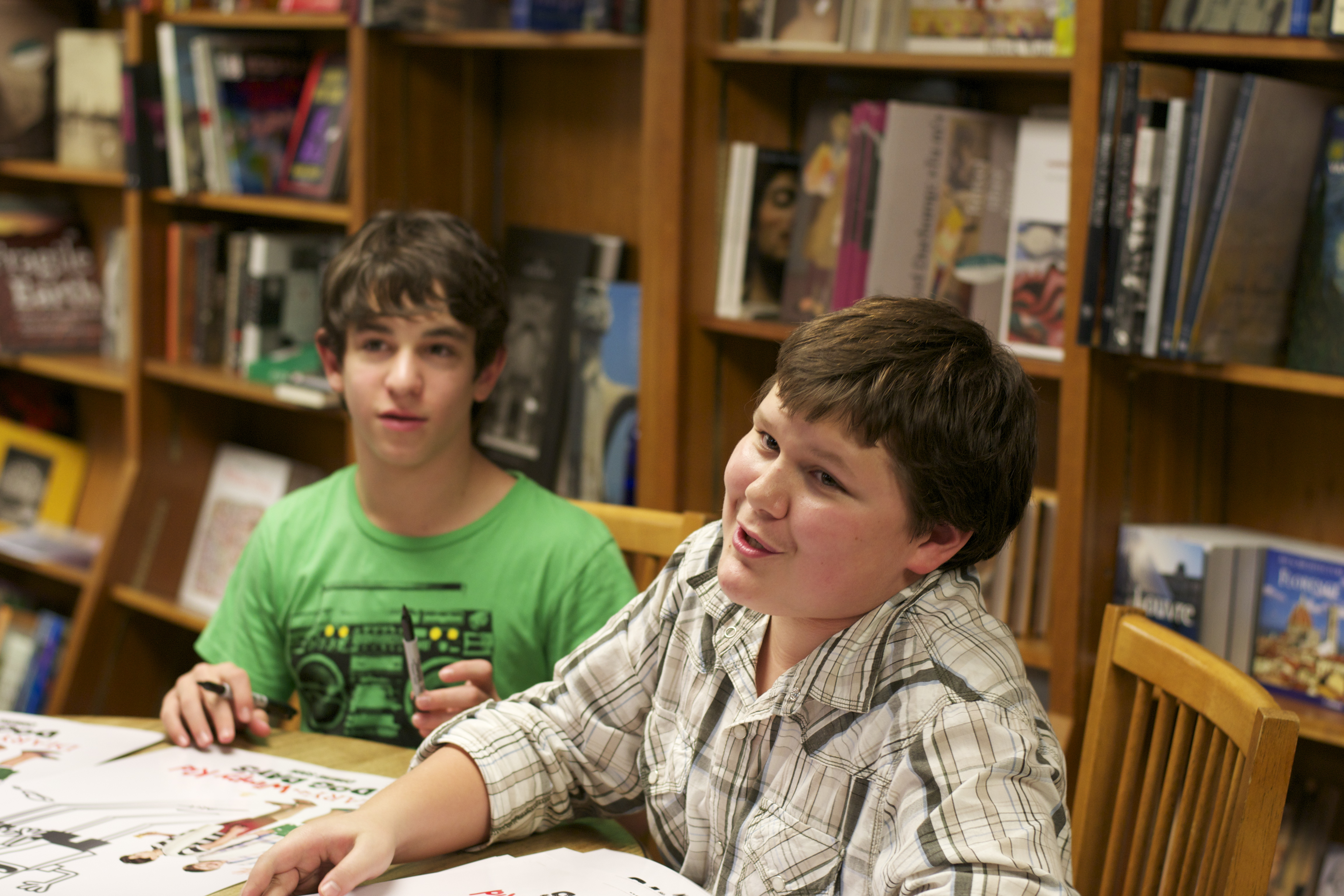
Gordon (left) with Robert Capron in 2011

In June 2010, 20th Century Fox announced a sequel to Diary of a Wimpy Kid; Gordon returned as Greg Heffley and the film, Diary of a Wimpy Kid: Rodrick Rules, was released on March 25, 2011.

In 2011, Gordon provided voices for Charlie Brown, Linus, and Franklin on the comedy show Robot Chicken, and in 2012, he reprised the role of Greg Heffley in Diary of a Wimpy Kid: Dog Days. In the fourth film, Diary of a Wimpy Kid: The Long Haul, he was replaced by Jason Drucker. In October 2013, Gordon was chosen to host a miniseries for Nintendo, titled Skylander's Boomcast, on YouTube channel SkylandersGame, reviewing and talking about the video game series Skylanders. In April 2023, it was announced Gordon would be the new voice of Tighnari in Genshin Impact, replacing Elliot Gindi.

Additional films for 2013 included The Incredible Burt Wonderstone and a role as Pete Kidder in Walden Media's and Hallmark Channel's Pete's Christmas.

== Filmography ==
=== Film ===
Year	Title	Role	Notes	Ref
2007	The Chubbchubbs Save Xmas	Brad Spoylt	Short film	
2007	Georgia Rule	Ethan		
2007	National Treasure: Book of Secrets	Lincoln conspiracy kid		
2007	Sex and Death 101	Barbeque brat		
2008	The Brothers Bloom	Young Bloom		
2008	Four Christmases	Kid #6 in jump-jump		
2008	Lower Learning	Frankie Fowler		
2008	Madagascar: Escape 2 Africa	Young Melman (voice)	Cameo	
2009	Santa Buddies	Puppy Paws (voice)	Direct to video	
2010	Diary of a Wimpy Kid	Greg Heffley		
2010	The Search for Santa Paws	Paws (voice)	Direct to video	
2011	Beverly Hills Chihuahua 2	Papi Junior (voice)	Direct to video	
2011	Diary of a Wimpy Kid: Rodrick Rules	Greg Heffley		
2012	Diary of a Wimpy Kid: Dog Days	Greg Heffley		
2012	Class Clown	Greg Heffley (voice)	Short film	
2013	The Incredible Burt Wonderstone	Will		
2014	The Boxcar Children	Henry Alden (voice)		
2014	Yellowbird	Max (voice)	English dub	
2015	Huevos: Little Rooster's Egg-cellent Adventure	Rolo (voice)	English dub	
2015	Killing Animals	Jeremy		
2016	Kingsglaive: Final Fantasy XV	Young Ravus (voice)	English dub	
2017	The Gettysburg Address	Daniel Skelly (voice)		
2020	American Pie Presents: Girls' Rules	Emmett	Direct to video	
2021	Dreamcatcher	Jake		
2021	Violet	Bradley		
2024	Last Appeal	Max Dagan		

=== Television ===
Year	Title	Role	Notes	Ref.
2006–2007	All of Us	Richie	2 episodes	
2006, 2009	How I Met Your Mother	Stacy's son, Tyler Stinson (Grant), Ted's nephew	3 episodes	
2007, 2011	Robot Chicken	Charlie Brown / Linus Van Pelt (voice)	2 episodes	
2008	David's Solution	Little David	Television film	
2008	Desperate Housewives	Little Robin Hood	Episode: "Now You Know"	
2008	Mad TV	The Joker	1 episode	
2008	The Mighty B!	Gwen's brother #4 (voice)	Episode: "Bee My Baby"	
2008	Special Agent Oso	Tyler / Rasheed (voice)	2 episodes	
2008–2009	Handy Manny	Little Lopart (voice)	2 episodes	
2008–2009	Ni Hao, Kai-lan	San San	15 episodes	
2008, 2010	Batman: The Brave and the Bold	Young Bruce Wayne / young Aqualad / kid (voice)	3 episodes	
2009	24	Eight-year-old boy	2 episodes	
2009	Afro Samurai: Resurrection	Kotaro (voice)	Television film; English dub	
2011	Childrens Hospital	Cody/Mike	Episode: "Ward 8"	
2011	Family Guy	Homeless boy	Episode: "Thanksgiving"	
2011	Bubble Guppies	Gil (voice)	Main role (season 1–2)	
2012	The Haunting Hour: The Series	Seth/Seti	Episode: "Night of the Mummy"	
2012	The Unprofessional	Dylan	Television film	
2013	Pete's Christmas	Pete Kidder	Television film	
2013	Uncle Grandpa	Belly Kid (voice)	Episode: "Belly Bros"	
2014	Last Man Standing	Andrew	3 episodes	
2016	Dead of Summer	Jason "Blotter" Cohen	Recurring role	
2016	Pals	Himself	Director; television film	
2016–2018	Star Wars Rebels	Mart Mattin / Imperial technician (voice)	3 episodes	
2017	The Good Doctor	Brandon	Episode: "Apple"	
2019–2020	Good Trouble	Tate Wilson	5 episodes	
2020	The Resident	Aaron Meuser	Episode: "The Last Shot"	
2024	Batwheels	Nightwing (voice)	Episode: "Nightbike"	

=== Video games ===
Year	Title	Role
2019	Kingdom Hearts III	Hayner
2020	Mafia: Definitive Edition	Additional voices
2023	Genshin Impact	Tighnari (Note: Replaced Elliot Gindi after sexual abuse allegations were raised against him.)

=== Music videos ===
Year	Title	Artist(s)	Role
2017	"Last Letter"	Witt Lowry	
2017	"Runaway" (feat. Xuitcasecity)	Spirix	
2026	"drama queens"	Forrest Nolan	

== Discography ==
=== Singles ===
Title	Song details
"Ladies in LA (feat. JAMEZ)"	Released: March 31, 2022; Label: Self-released; Format: Digital download, streaming
"Time Bomb"	Released: February 17, 2023; Label: Self-released; Format: Digital download, streaming
"Waste My Time"	Released: May 26, 2023; Label: Self-released; Format: Digital download, streaming
"Bullet Train"	Released: October 23, 2024; Label: Self-released; Format: Digital download, streaming
"Days With You"	Released: April 4, 2025; Label: Self-released; Format: Digital download, streaming
"Loved and Laundered"	Released: July 14, 2025; Label: Self-released; Format: Digital download, streaming

== Awards and nominations ==
Award	Year (Note: Where available, the "Year" value is linked to the specific ceremony.)	Category	Work	Result	Ref.
Kids' Choice Awards	2013	Favorite Movie Actor	Diary of a Wimpy Kid: Dog Days	Nominated	
Young Artist Award	2008	Best Performance in a Feature Film – Supporting Young Actor (Comedy or Musical)	Georgia Rule	Won	
Young Artist Award	2009	Best Performance in a Voice-Over Role – Young Actor	Madagascar: Escape 2 Africa	Nominated	
Young Artist Award	2011	Best Performance in a Feature Film – Leading Young Actor	Diary of a Wimpy Kid	Nominated	
Young Artist Award	2011	Best Performance in a Feature Film – Young Ensemble Cast	Diary of a Wimpy Kid	Won	
Young Artist Award	2012	Best Performance in a Feature Film – Leading Young Actor	Diary of a Wimpy Kid: Rodrick Rules	Nominated	
Young Artist Award	2013	Best Performance in a Feature Film – Leading Young Actor	Diary of a Wimpy Kid: Dog Days	Nominated	
Young Artist Award	2013	Best Performance in a Feature Film – Young Ensemble Cast	Diary of a Wimpy Kid: Dog Days	Won	
