= Robert Capron =

American actor (born 1998)

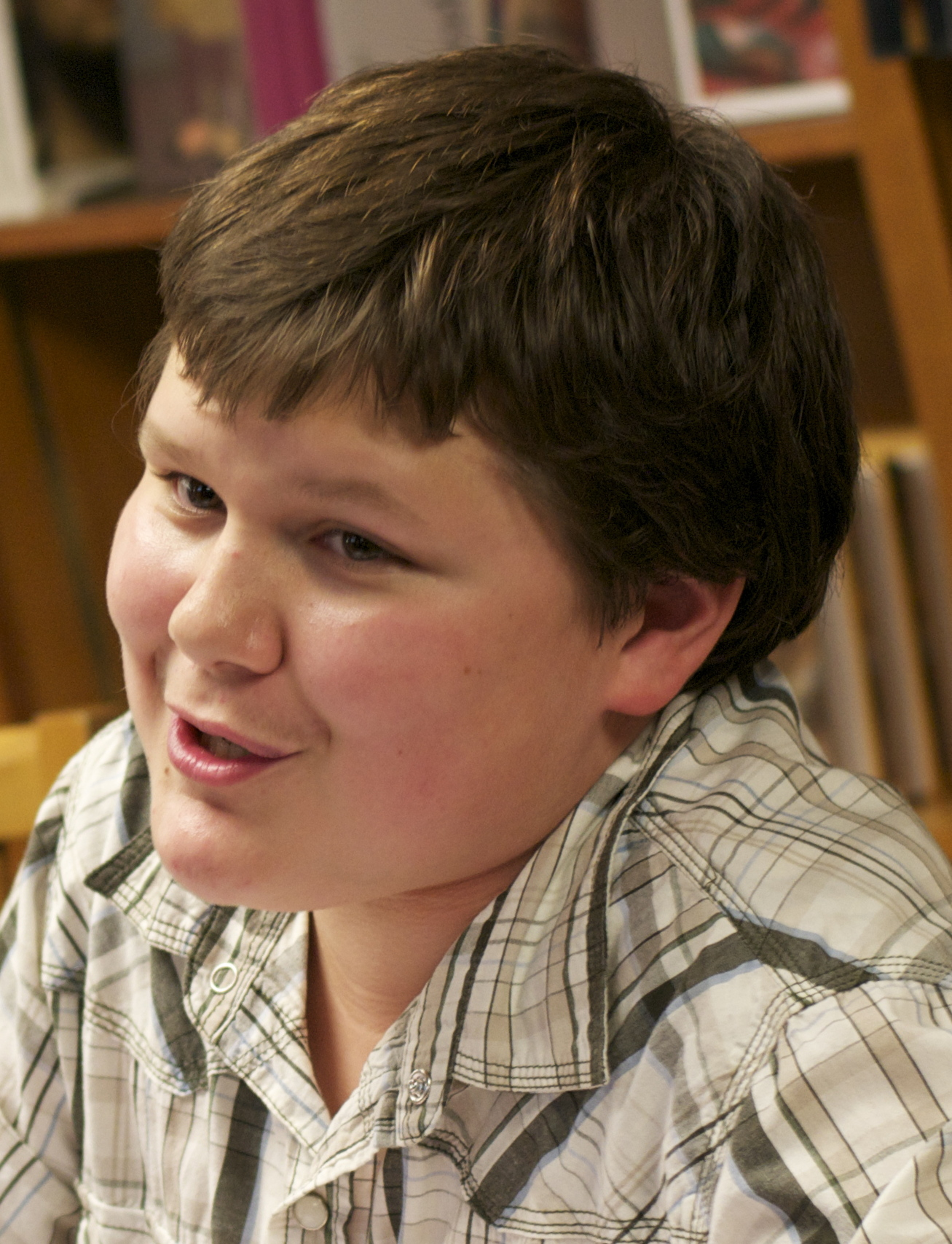
- Capron in 2011
- Born: Robert Banfield Capron Jr. July 9, 1998 (age 28); Providence, Rhode Island, U.S.
- Other name: Robert B. Capron
- Education: Brown University
- Occupation: Actor
- Years active: 2009–present

Robert Banfield Capron Jr. (born July 9, 1998) is an American actor. After making his film debut with a minor role in Bride Wars (2009), Capron received mainstream recognition for his starring role as Rowley Jefferson in the Diary of a Wimpy Kid film series (2010–2012).

Following Diary of a Wimpy Kid, Capron had a starring voice role in the animated film Tarzan (2013), and supporting roles in the films The Sorcerer's Apprentice (2010), Frankenweenie (2012), The Way, Way Back (2013), and The Polka King (2017). He also portrayed a young Curly Howard in the comedy film The Three Stooges (2012), and had a recurring role as Mason on the CBS television series Elementary (2014–2018).

== Early life ==
Capron was born Robert Banfield Capron Jr. on July 9, 1998, in Providence, Rhode Island to Kaye (née Goodard) and Robert Banfield Capron Sr.

== Career ==
Capron started off with a role in Bride Wars, and later had small parts in Hachiko: A Dog's Story and the Disney film, The Sorcerer's Apprentice. His mother, Kaye Capron, played his character's mother in Diary of a Wimpy Kid. Capron is from Scituate, Rhode Island, and has also been billed as Robert B. Capron. Sometime after, he began teaching film and acting classes at Actors for Autism.

== Filmography ==
=== Film ===
Year	Title	Role	Notes
2009	Bride Wars	Student #2	Credited as Robert B. Capron
2009	Hachi: A Dog's Tale	Student	Uncredited
2010	Diary of a Wimpy Kid	Rowley Jefferson	
2010	The Sorcerer's Apprentice	Oliver	Credited as Robert B. Capron
2011	Diary of a Wimpy Kid: Rodrick Rules	Rowley Jefferson	
2012	The Three Stooges	Young Curly	
2012	Diary of a Wimpy Kid: Dog Days	Rowley Jefferson	
2012	Frankenweenie	Bob (voice)	
2013	The Way, Way Back	Kyle	Credited as Robert Banfield Capron
2013	Tarzan	Derek (voice)	
2016	Annabelle Hooper and the Ghosts of Nantucket	Jake McFeeley	
2017	The Polka King	David Lewan	
2020	Growing Pains	Moe	Short film
2020	A Different Kind of Animal	Owen	Short film
2021	Bye Bye Buddy	Peter	Short film
2021	Caffe Greco	Sympathetic Psychic	Short film; also associate producer

=== Television ===
Year	TItle	Role	Notes
2011–2012	R.L. Stine's The Haunting Hour	Lex Johnson / Marty	2 episodes
2012	The Middle	Tyler	Episode: "Get Your Business Done"
2014–2018	Elementary	Mason	Recurring role (season 3), guest (season 4–6); 8 episodes

== Awards and nominations ==
Year	Award	Category	Nominated work	Result
2011	Young Artist Awards	Best Performance in a Feature Film – Supporting Young Actor	Diary of a Wimpy Kid	Nominated
2011	Young Artist Awards	Best Performance in a Feature Film – Young Ensemble Cast	Diary of a Wimpy Kid	Won
2012	Young Artist Awards	Best Performance in a Feature Film – Supporting Young Actor	Diary of a Wimpy Kid: Rodrick Rules	Nominated
2013	Young Artist Awards	Best Performance in a Feature Film – Supporting Young Actor	Diary of a Wimpy Kid: Dog Days	Won
2013	Young Artist Awards	Best Performance in a Feature Film – Young Ensemble Cast	Diary of a Wimpy Kid: Dog Days	Won
