= Greg Heffley =

Fictional character in the Diary of a Wimpy Kid series

- Diary of a Wimpy Kid character
- First appearance: Diary of a Wimpy Kid (2007 book) (Note: This was a predecessor to the original book, published on Funbrain.)
- Created by: Jeff Kinney
- Designed by: Jeff Kinney
- Portrayed by: Zachary Gordon (2010–2012); Nathaniel Marten (2010, cameo as an adult in a flash-forward); Dylan Bell (2010, cameo as a kindergartener in a flashback); Ricky Falbo (2016); Jason Drucker (2017); Patrick Scott McDermott / Huxley Westemeier (Diary of a Wimpy Kid: The Musical, revised 2022 production)
- Voiced by: L.J. Bennet (singing voice for live action 2010 film); Brady Noon (CGI film series, 2021–2022); Wesley Kimmel (CGI film series, 2023); Aaron D. Harris (CGI film series, 2025); Jacob Issac Peterson (CGI film series, 2026)

In-universe information
- Full name: Gregory Heffley
- Nickname: Greg
- Gender: Male
- Occupation: Student
- Family: Frank Heffley (father); Susan Heffley (mother); Manny Heffley (younger brother); Rodrick Heffley (older brother); Gramma (maternal grandmother); Grampa (maternal grandfather; possibly deceased)
- Home: 12 Surrey Street, Plainview
- Nationality: American

Gregory "Greg" Heffley is a fictional character and the protagonist of the Diary of a Wimpy Kid franchise, serving as the antiheroic unreliable narrator of the books, online series, and multimedia franchise. He was created by Jeff Kinney, and portrayed by Zachary Gordon and Jason Drucker in the first three films and the fourth film, respectively.

== Characteristics and role ==
Greg was originally conceptualized in early 1998, after creator Jeff Kinney struggled to become a newspaper cartoonist. Greg is obsessed with his social status, but is bullied by the bigger students at his school and his older teenage brother, Rodrick. He frequently exploits and belittles his sole friend, Rowley, for his perceived social incompetence, despite Rowley's stable family life and better social relationships. Greg receives bad grades in school, is addicted to video games, especially the fictional Twisted Wizard, and loves junk food. Despite these negative traits, he does show humanity, sensitivity, and care for those he loves.

Because of these qualities, internet users began to question if Greg was a sociopath. Jeff Kinney stated:

Greg is recording his life at a time when he shouldn't be recording. It's right when he's not a fully formed person, and I think that people that give Greg a label are sort of missing the joke. Right off the bat, Greg says, "One day when I'm rich and famous, I won't have time to answer people's stupid questions." Whatever that is – I'm not sure how you label that – it's misguided. It's a little bit cocksure. But I don't think it's anything worse than that.

Kinney, on separate occasions, has also clarified that Greg is supposed to represent an average and normal selfish middle schooler. Kinney never intended to write books for children, which is why Greg is a complicated and flawed character. Kinney has also denied the sociopath theories stating he always saw Greg as an "accurate kid" and people who give him that distinction are "missing the joke".

== Film appearances ==
In the original trilogy of the film series adaptations, Greg was portrayed by actor Zachary Gordon. In the film adaptation of The Long Haul however, Greg was instead portrayed by Jason Drucker. After the film series was given a reboot during the acquisition of 21st Century Fox, Greg was voiced by Brady Noon in the animated adaptation of the first book and its sequel. He was voiced by Wesley Kimmel in the third animated film and Aaron D. Harris in the fourth animated film.

== Reception ==
Due to Greg's narcissistic and selfish traits, some parents have questioned whether Greg's depiction has a negative influence on children. In 2008, Jewish publication Aish called the character "totally diabolical" and that parents should avoid the series at all costs. In Texas in October 2018, Greg's bad morals and pessimistic world view challenged the book to be banned by some school districts. Tidy Books wrote that Greg never learned from his lessons and rarely gets punished or gives sincere apologies, and that the writing is too subtle for kids to realize that he is doing the wrong thing and is an unreliable narrator. Some, such as reviewer Declan Rowles, have criticized the disapproval against the character, stating that the series doesn't glorify Greg's behavior and the majority of children understand that.

His film counterpart was given similar reception as Rotten Tomatoes has said that Greg is an "unlikable protagonist". Margaret Pomeranz disliked the character of Greg Heffley, saying "I really thought he was unpleasant. I did not want to spend time with him. I couldn't wait for the end of this film." However, reception to the character improved since the first film and in her review of the Dog Days film, Abby West of Entertainment Weekly wrote that "though often self-centered and conniving, Greg remains a likeable kid".

Greg's character has also garnered widespread acclaim for his relatability and anti-hero status. In a review, Sebastian Hall for Cherwell remarked that Greg embodied the disillusionment and irony characteristic of modern comic heroes. Hall argued that Greg's self-delusion and hubris, such as his attempts to belittle Rowley Jefferson or his misguided pursuit of popularity, is central to the series' humor. He compares Greg's struggles with contemporary issues, like technology clashes and commercialism, to literary figures like Adrian Mole and Gordon Comstock, portraying him as a voice of modern frustrations.
