= Robbie Pickering =

American film and television writer, director, and producer

Robbie Pickering is an American screenwriter, director, and producer. He is best known as the creator and showrunner of the Starz limited series Gaslit (2022), and for directing the award-winning independent film Natural Selection (2011).

== Early life ==
Pickering was raised in Jersey Village, Texas. He grew up in an Evangelical Christian household, an experience he has described as influential to his writing.

== Career ==
=== Film ===
Pickering wrote and directed the independent feature film Natural Selection (2011), which premiered at South by Southwest (SXSW). The film, starring Rachael Harris and Matt O'Leary, won multiple awards at the festival, including the Grand Jury Award, Audience Award, and awards for screenplay, editing, and score.

In a review for Variety, Joe Leydon called the film "An engagingly offbeat comedy that respects its characters too much to push too hard for easy laugh." Of protagonist Linda, Roger Ebert wrote, "Pickering’s inspiration is to see her in a positive light, as a completely good and yet human character; if he’d mocked or satirized her beliefs, the movie might have left a sour taste, but in Harris’ performance, we sense forgiveness and charity at work."

Pickering later directed the horror-comedy film Freaks of Nature (2015) for Sony Pictures, with a cast including Nicholas Braun, Mackenzie Davis, Josh Fadem, Denis Leary, Bob Odenkirk, Keegan-Michael Key, Ed Westwick, Vanessa Hudgens, Patton Oswalt, and Ian Roberts.

=== Television ===
Pickering created and served as showrunner for the Starz limited series Gaslit (2022), a political drama based on Leon Neyfakh’s podcast Slow Burn. The series stars Julia Roberts, Sean Penn, Dan Stevens, Betty Gilpin, and Shea Whigham, and examines the Watergate scandal through lesser-known stories.

In a review for ABC News, Peter Travers called Gaslit "a hell of a story" and "the juiciest role Julia Roberts has had in years." For the Chicago Sun-Times, Richard Roeper wrote, "Roberts delivers a magnificent performance as a unique American original who refused to be silenced even after she was held captive, abused, vilified and turned into something of a national joke." The review also notes the choice to portray Nixon primarily through news footage, calling it "a smart move, as we’ve seen this story through his eyes a dozen times before."

Pickering has also worked as a writer or director on several television series, including Mr. Robot, Search Party, One Mississippi, and Shut Eye.

== Themes and style ==
Pickering often returns to themes relating to his Evangelical Christian upbringing.

== Filmography ==
Film

- Natural Selection (2011) (Also writer)
- Freaks of Nature (2015)

Television

Year	Title	Director	Writer	Notes
2015	One Mississippi	No	Yes	Episode "Let the Good Times Roll" (Also story editor)
2016	Shut Eye	Yes	No	Episode "Charles the Magnificent"
2019	Mr. Robot	No	Yes	Episode "408 Request Timeout"
2022	Gaslit	No	Yes	Also creator and executive producer
