= Winzola McLendon =

American journalist and author (1910–2012)

Winzola P. McLendon
- Born: Winzola Poole; December 6, 1910; Cardwell, Missouri, U.S.
- Died: March 1, 2012 (aged 101); Washington, D.C., U.S.
- Other name: Winnie McLendon
- Occupations: Journalist, author's agent and bestselling book author
- Known for: News coverage of the Presidency of Richard Nixon
- Notable work: Author, Martha: The Life of Martha Mitchell
- Spouse: John Benjamin McLendon (m. 1935)

Winzola Poole McLendon (December 6, 1910 – March 1, 2012), also known as "Winnie McLendon" or "Winnie P. McLendon," was an American journalist, author's agent and bestselling author who was known for her news coverage of the Nixon White House and the family, friends, political associates, and political opponents of United States President Richard Nixon.

== Formative years and family ==
Born as Winzola Poole in Cardwell, Missouri on December 6, 1910, "Winnie" Poole was a daughter of Mactie Ulysses Poole (1886–1951) and Ethel (Romines) Poole (1888–1955). Raised in Mangum and Oklahoma City, Oklahoma, and then Long Beach, California, she attended Long Beach Polytechnic High School, where she met her future husband, John Benjamin McLendon (1911–1993).

Following her graduation from high school, she found work as a physician's assistant in Long Beach, and began dating, and then subsequently married, Bennie McLendon. Following his graduation from the University of Southern California's law school and their 1935 wedding, she relocated with him to Phoenix, Arizona, where he had been hired by an insurance company. Their daughter, Martha Elizabeth McLendon, was born several years later.

== World War II ==
During World War II, Winzola P. McLendon became a "Navy wife," after her husband enlisted with the United States Navy. She and her daughter relocated with him to Coronado, California, where he was stationed, and then returned to Long Beach, after he was assigned to the USS Bowie. They later relocated as a family to Pearl Harbor in Hawaii, where she subsequently began her career in journalism.

== Journalism career ==
Hired as a columnist by the Honolulu Advertiser during World War II, McLendon also began writing for the Honolulu Star-Bulletin. She was subsequently hired to write for The Philadelphia Inquirer, a major American newspaper that was headquartered in Philadelphia, Pennsylvania. McLendon became a staff writer for The Washington Post after she and her husband relocated to Washington, D.C.

Awarded a byline with the major newspaper for the nation's capital, her work with The Washington Post achieved increasing recognition as she progressed from writing articles and feature stories for the Women's Section, including profiles of U.S. First Ladies Mamie Eisenhower, Jacqueline Kennedy, Pat Nixon, Betty Ford, and Rosalynn Carter, to covering presidential campaigns and major White House events as a member of the National Press Club.

=== Nixon White House coverage ===
During the Nixon White House years, McLendon met and built a working relationship with Martha Mitchell, the wife of Nixon's attorney general John N. Mitchell. Mitchell subsequently became famous for her interactions with McLendon and other prominent journalists, including Helen Thomas, and was described by Time magazine as one of the most influential women in Washington. Shortly after Mitchell's husband was chosen to head Nixon's 1972 reelection campaign, her prominence, and that of McLendon and the other journalists covering her, increased further as Martha Mitchell became a whistleblower to the media regarding "dirty tricks" that were being perpetrated by campaign staff to help Nixon win reelection.

McLendon had also begun collaborating with Martha Mitchell on Mitchell's planned autobiography around this same time; however, its publication was repeatedly stalled by Mitchell and was ultimately never published as an autobiography due to Mitchell's illness and death.

Following the Watergate scandal and Nixon's subsequent resignation from the presidency, McLendon obtained the first interview with Nixon and his wife, Pat, at their home, La Casa Pacifica, in San Clemente, California.

In addition, McLendon collaborated with Frances Fitzgerald "Scottie" Smith to research and write the 1970 book, Don't Quote Me: Washington Newswomen & the Power Society.

=== Later career ===
During her later years, McLendon expanded her byline's reach further by researching and writing cover stories and other feature articles for major American magazines, including Good Housekeeping, Ladies' Home Journal, Look, McCall's, Newsday, and Town and Country.

She also worked as an agent for multiple Washington-based writers, and then became a bestselling author in her own right as the author of Martha: The Life of Martha Mitchell.

Preceded in death by her husband in 1993, McLendon spent most of her time at the second home she had shared with her husband in Lake Oswego, Oregon.

=== Written works (abridged list) ===
- McLendon, Winzola. "Mainmast Musings." Honolulu, Hawaii: The Honolulu Advertiser, May 14, 1950.
- McLendon, Winzola. "Reservist Seeks Information on Scientist's Hawaii Work." Honolulu, Hawaii: Honolulu Star-Bulletin, April 14, 1951.
- McLendon, Winzola. "Naval Men, Wives, Plan for Holiday." Philadelphia, Pennsylvania: The Philadelphia Inquirer, December 30, 1951.
- McLendon, Winzola. "Marine Wives Plan Fete." Philadelphia, Pennsylvania: The Philadelphia Inquirer, March 2, 1952.
- McLendon, Winzola. "Phila. Club Aids Korean War Waifs." Philadelphia, Pennsylvania: The Philadelphia Inquirer, May 16, 1952.
- McLendon, Winzola. "Navy's Guinea Pig: He Tests Everything from Space Suits to Ejection Seats." Philadelphia, Pennsylvania: The Philadelphia Inquirer, June 21, 1953.
- McLendon, Winzola. "Hide the Dessert, Here's JFK." Boston, Massachusetts: The Boston Globe, June 25, 1963 (syndicated from The Washington Post).
- McLendon, Winzola. "JFK Hates to Pass Up Pasta." Fort Worth, Texas: Fort Worth Star-Telegram, June 26, 1963, p. 2 (syndicated from The Washington Post).
- McLendon, Winzola. "President's Diet Is Watched." Phoenix, Arizona: The Arizona Republic, June 28, 1963, p. 39 (syndicated from The Washington Post).
- McLendon, Winzola. "Luci Files Applications at Two Nursing Schools." Council Bluffs, Iowa: The Daily Nonpareil, February 13, 1965 (syndicated from The Washington Post).
- McLendon, Winzola. "Jackie Kennedy to Attend British Memorial Dedication." Edmonton, Alberta, Canada: The Edmonton Journal, March 6, 1965 (syndicated from The Washington Post).
- McLendon, Winzola. "It Wasn't Exactly a Log-Cabin Childhood, But...Lyndon's Youth Had the Makings." Montreal, Quebec, Canada: The Montreal Star, May 22, 1965 (syndicated from The Washington Post).
- McLendon, Winzola. "Her Anxiety and Relief: Relaxed First Lady Describes Emotions During Husband's Gall Bladder Operation." Los Angeles, California: The Los Angeles Times, October 11, 1965 (exclusive from The Washington Post).
- McLendon, Winzola. "Yankee designers flourish in Italian surroundings." Johnson City, Tennessee: Press-Chronicle, January 15, 1967, p. 14 (syndicated from The Washington Post).
- McLendon, Winzola. "Pat Nixon: Progress Report—Part I: The Launching of a Project." Hempstead, New York: Newsday, July 8, 1969.
- McLendon, Winzola. "Pat Nixon: Progress Report—Part II: Life at White House Is More Sedate." Hempstead, New York: Newsday, July 9, 1969.
- McLendon, Winzola. "Still the Mostest." Hempstead, New York: Newsday, January 29, 1970.
- McLendon, Winzola. "Betty Ford on the Value of a Homemaker." New York, New York: Good Housekeeping, August 1976.
- McLendon, Winzola. Martha: The Life of Martha Mitchell. New York, New York: Random House, 1979.

== Death, funeral and interment ==
A resident of the Westchester in Washington, D.C. during her final years, McLendon died at her home on March 1, 2012. Following her funeral at the Robert A. Pumphrey Funeral Home in Bethesda, Maryland at 1 p.m. on Friday, March 9, she was interred next to her husband at the Arlington National Cemetery.

== In popular culture ==
McLendon was portrayed by Allison Tolman in Gaslit, a miniseries about the life of Martha Mitchell.
