= Frank Wills =

Frank Wills may refer to:

- Frank Wills (security guard) (1948–2000), discovered the Watergate break-in
- Frank Wills (architect) (1822–1857), British-born architect working in North America
- Frank Wills (baseball) (1958–2012), Major League Baseball pitcher
- Frank William Wills (1852–1932), British architect and Lord Mayor of Bristol
