= Gaslit (TV series) =

American television series

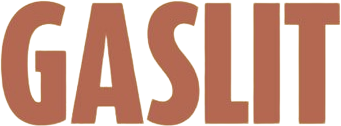
- Genre: Political thriller
- Created by: Robbie Pickering
- Based on: Slow Burn by Leon Neyfakh
- Directed by: Matt Ross
- Starring: Julia Roberts; Sean Penn; Dan Stevens; Betty Gilpin; Shea Whigham; Darby Camp
- Composer: Mac Quayle
- Country of origin: United States
- Original language: English
- No. of episodes: 8

Production
- Executive producers: Robbie Pickering; Matt Ross; Sam Esmail; Chad Hamilton; Julia Roberts; Gabriel Roth; Josh Levin
- Producers: Caroline James; Gregg Tilson
- Cinematography: Larkin Seiple
- Editor: Joe Leonard
- Production companies: Esmail Corp; Anonymous Content; Red Om Films; Slate; Universal Content Productions

Original release
- Network: Starz
- Release: April 24 – June 12, 2022

Gaslit is an American political thriller television limited series based on the first season of the podcast Slow Burn by Leon Neyfakh. It stars Julia Roberts, Sean Penn, Dan Stevens, Betty Gilpin, Shea Whigham, and Darby Camp. It premiered on Starz on April 24, 2022.

== Premise ==
Gaslit begins in early 1972 and follows the story of the Watergate scandal through the lives of several individuals on its periphery. President Nixon, for example, is rarely seen, while the main protagonist is Martha Mitchell—known as "The Mouth from the South" due to her propensity for talking to the press, often at inopportune times for her husband, John. He opens the series as Nixon's Attorney General. She is aware that her behavior makes her unpopular with the government and her husband, on one occasion telling the latter "get another wife if you want a silent one". Seen as a liability by both, she eventually blows the whistle on Nixon's knowledge of the activities of his staffers.

Other perspectives come from the burglary's coordinator, G. Gordon Liddy, who leads a gang of ex-CIA agents and Cuban exiles. He is also presented as a Nazi sympathizer—"an Apocalypse Now-style menace, a sage spouting nonsense who likes to hold his hand over a burning flame"—who presents the White House with a grand plan for the wholesale infiltration of the Democratic Party. White House Counsel John Dean is at first pleased to be chosen for the position, but becomes increasingly unnerved at the extent of the administration's involvement in criminality until he realizes he is being set up as a fall guy. His personal life is also complicated by his engagement and subsequent marriage to a woman described as a "leftie" in the review by The Independent. The Daily Telegraph summarizes Gaslit as focusing "on the Watergate characters who were right at the center of the scandal but who have faded from public memory"; similarly, The Hollywood Reporter identifies the series as "refocusing the events of 1972–1975 away from the white men in positions of political power to white wives, a black security guard, and Italian and Hispanic FBI field agents."

== Cast ==
=== Main ===
- Julia Roberts as Martha Mitchell
- Sean Penn as John N. Mitchell
- Dan Stevens as John Dean
- Betty Gilpin as Mo Dean
- Shea Whigham as G. Gordon Liddy
- Darby Camp as Marty Mitchell

=== Recurring ===
- Allison Tolman as Winzola "Winnie" McLendon
- J.C. Mackenzie as Howard Hunt
- Chris Bauer as James McCord
- Chris Messina as Agent Angelo Lano
- Carlos Valdes as Agent Paul Magallanes
- Hamish Linklater as Jeb Magruder
- John Carroll Lynch as L. Patrick Gray
- Jordi Caballero as Eugenio Martínez
- Oscar Torre as Virgilio Gonzalez
- Jeff Doucette as Senator Sam Ervin
- Patrick R. Walker as Frank Wills
- Patton Oswalt as Charles Colson
- Nat Faxon as H. R. Haldeman
- Martha Kelly as Rose Mary Woods
- Erinn Hayes as Peggy Ebbitt
- Raphael Sbarge as Charles N. Shaffer
- Keisuke Hoashi as Senator Daniel Inouye
- Anne Dudek as Diana Oweiss
- Chris Conner as John Ehrlichman
- Brian Geraghty as Peter Bailin (based on Steve King)
- Nelson Franklin as Richard A. Moore
- Reed Diamond as Mark Felt
- John Ventimiglia as Judge John Sirica
- Jim Meskimen as Senator Edward Gurney
- Johnny Berchtold as Jay Jennings
- Adam Ray as Ron Ziegler
- Kat Foster as Barbara Walters
- Billy Smith as Ken Ebbitt
- Asha Kamali as Linda
- Aleksandar Filimonović as Zolton
- Marin Ireland as Judy Hoback Miller

== Episodes ==
No.	Title	Directed by	Written by	Original release date	U.S. viewers (millions)
1	"Will"	Matt Ross	Robbie Pickering	April 24, 2022	0.224
2	"California"	Matt Ross	Robbie Pickering & Amelia Gray	May 1, 2022	0.227
3	"King George"	Matt Ross	Robbie Pickering & Amelia Gray	May 8, 2022	0.204
4	"Malum in Se"	Matt Ross	Alberto Roldán & Amelia Gray	May 15, 2022	0.194
5	"Honeymoon"	Matt Ross	Robbie Pickering & Anayat Fakhraie	May 22, 2022	0.208
6	"Tuffy"	Matt Ross	Uzoamaka Maduka & Sofya Levitsky-Weitz	May 29, 2022	0.217
7	"Year of the Rat"	Matt Ross	Amelia Gray	June 5, 2022	0.266
8	"Final Days"	Matt Ross	Robbie Pickering	June 12, 2022	0.339

== Production ==
Gaslit is a political thriller based on the first season of the Slate podcast Slow Burn. The series from Universal Content Productions was announced in February 2020, with Sam Esmail attached to executive produce and Julia Roberts, Sean Penn, Armie Hammer and Joel Edgerton joining the cast. Edgerton was also set to direct the series along with his brother Nash Edgerton. Hammer would exit the series due to scheduling conflicts in January 2021. In February, the series was picked up by Starz, while both Edgerton brothers also exited the series. Matt Ross joined as the new director. Dan Stevens would be cast to replace Hammer in April, with Betty Gilpin, Darby Camp and Shea Whigham joining in May and Whigham replacing Edgerton.

Filming began that same month in Los Angeles, California. In July 2021, Allison Tolman, J.C. Mackenzie, Chris Bauer, Chris Messina and Hamish Linklater joined the cast in recurring roles. Penn had refused to return to the series until all cast and crew on the production had the COVID-19 vaccine. In September, the studio and Penn reached a compromise where Penn would film his scenes in two weeks with a vaccinated production crew. Fourteen cast members were confirmed for recurring roles in October. On February 2, 2022, the series was given an April 24, 2022 premiere date. In an interview, Pickering said the series was not a "girlboss overcorrect of history" or a "Wikipedia run down" but that their goal was to accurately depict the historical events. "Anyone can go and read a book about this or the Wikipedia entry," Stevens said, "but there are human stories that illustrate the depth."

== Reception ==
=== Critical response ===
Metacritic review
breakdown (unweighted)

Positive
22 (76%)
Mixed
5 (17%)
Negative
2 (7%)

On the review aggregator website Rotten Tomatoes, 89% of 55 critics' reviews are positive, with an average rating of 7.40/10. The website's consensus reads: "Fronted by a nervy Julia Roberts, Gaslit is less a slow burn than an acting extravaganza of big personalities enmeshed in historic scandal." Metacritic, which uses a weighted average, assigned a score of 70 out of 100 based on 29 critics, indicating "generally favorable reviews".

=== Ratings ===
Viewership and ratings per episode of Gaslit
No.	Title	Air date	Rating (18–49)	Viewers (millions)	DVR (18–49)	DVR viewers (millions)	Total (18–49)	Total viewers (millions)
1	"Will"	April 24, 2022	0.02	0.224	TBD	TBD	TBD	TBD
2	"California"	May 1, 2022	0.01	0.227	TBD	TBD	TBD	TBD
3	"King George"	May 8, 2022	0.01	0.204	TBD	TBD	TBD	TBD
4	"Malum in Se"	May 15, 2022	0.00	0.194	TBD	TBD	TBD	TBD
5	"Honeymoon"	May 22, 2022	0.02	0.208	TBD	TBD	TBD	TBD
6	"Tuffy"	May 29, 2022	0.02	0.217	TBD	TBD	TBD	TBD
7	"Year of the Rat"	June 5, 2022	0.02	0.266	TBD	TBD	TBD	TBD
8	"Final Days"	June 12, 2022	0.03	0.339	TBD	TBD	TBD	TBD

=== Accolades ===
Year	Award	Category	Nominee(s)	Result	Ref.
2022	Hollywood Critics Association Awards	Best Broadcast Network or Cable Limited or Anthology Series	Gaslit	Nominated	
2022	Hollywood Critics Association Awards	Best Actor in a Broadcast Network or Cable Limited or Anthology Series	Sean Penn	Nominated	
2022	Hollywood Critics Association Awards	Best Actress in a Broadcast Network or Cable Limited or Anthology Series	Julia Roberts	Nominated	
2022	Hollywood Critics Association Awards	Best Supporting Actor in a Broadcast Network or Cable Limited or Anthology Series	Dan Stevens	Nominated	
2022	Hollywood Critics Association Awards	Best Supporting Actress in a Broadcast Network or Cable Limited or Anthology Series	Betty Gilpin	Nominated	
2022	Primetime Emmy Awards	Outstanding Cinematography for a Limited or Anthology Series or Movie	Larkin Seiple (for "Will")	Nominated	
2022	Primetime Emmy Awards	Outstanding Prosthetic Makeup	Kazu Hiro, Vincent Van Dyke, Richard Redrefsen, Christopher Nelson, Michael Ornelaz, and Kelly Golden (for "Final Days")	Nominated	
2022	Primetime Emmy Awards	Outstanding Sound Editing for a Limited or Anthology Series, Movie or Special	Kevin Buchholz, Stefani Feldman, Sang Kim, Dan Kremer, Adam Parrish-King, Sam Munoz, Jordan Aldinger, Ben Zales, Chris Rummel, Jacob McNaughton, and Noel Vought (for "Year of the Rat")	Nominated	
2022	Primetime Emmy Awards	Outstanding Sound Mixing for a Limited or Anthology Series or Movie	John W. Cook II, Ben Wilkins, and Devendra Cleary (for "Final Days")	Nominated	
2022	Set Decorators Society of America Awards	Best Achievement in Décor/Design of a Television Movie or Limited Series	Jennifer Lukehart and Daniel Novotny	Nominated	
2023	Critics' Choice Awards	Best Limited Series	Gaslit	Nominated	
2023	Critics' Choice Awards	Best Actress in a Limited Series or Movie Made for Television	Julia Roberts	Nominated	
2023	Critics' Choice Awards	Best Supporting Actor in a Limited Series or Movie Made for Television	Shea Whigham	Nominated	
2023	Critics' Choice Awards	Best Supporting Actress in a Limited Series or Movie Made for Television	Betty Gilpin	Nominated	
2023	Golden Globe Awards	Best Actress – Miniseries or Television Film	Julia Roberts	Nominated	
2023	Golden Reel Awards	Outstanding Achievement in Sound Editing – Broadcast Long Form Effects and Foley	Kevin W. Buchholz, Stefani Feldman, Dan Kremer, Adam Parrish, Sam Munoz, Jordan Aldinger, Jacob McNaughton, Noel Vought	Nominated	
2023	Make-Up Artists and Hair Stylists Guild Awards	Best Special Make-Up Effects in a Television Series, Television Limited or Miniseries or Television New Media Series	Kazu Hiro, Richard Redlefsen, Mike Ornela	Nominated	
