= Martha Mitchell effect =

Labelling real experiences as delusional

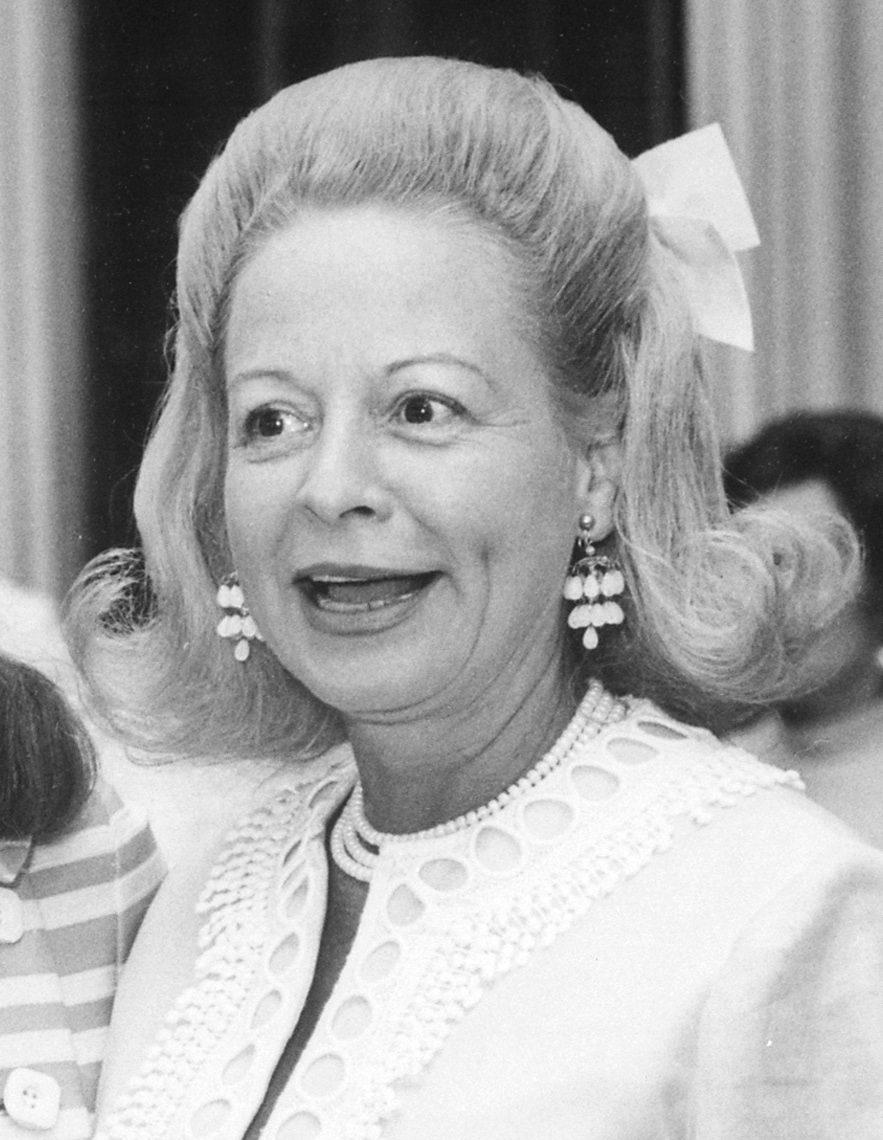
Martha Mitchell, for whom the effect is named

The Martha Mitchell effect occurs when a medical professional labels a patient's accurate perception of real events as delusional, resulting in misdiagnosis.

== Description ==
According to Bell et al., "sometimes, improbable reports are erroneously assumed to be symptoms of mental illness", due to a "failure or inability to verify whether the events have actually taken place, no matter how improbable intuitively they might appear to the busy clinician".

Examples of such situations are:

- Pursuit by organized criminals
- Surveillance by law enforcement officers
- Infidelity by a spouse
- Physical issues

Quoting psychotherapist Joseph Berke, the authors report that, "even paranoids have enemies". Delusions are "abnormal beliefs" and may be bizarre (considered impossible to be true), or non-bizarre (possible, but considered by the clinician as highly improbable). Beliefs about being poisoned, being followed, marital infidelity or a conspiracy in the workplace are examples of non-bizarre beliefs that may be considered delusions. Any patient can be misdiagnosed by clinicians, especially patients with a history of paranoid delusions.

== Origin ==
Psychologist Brendan Maher named the effect after Martha Mitchell. Mitchell was the wife of John Mitchell, United States Attorney General in the Nixon administration. When she alleged that White House officials were engaged in illegal activities, her claims were attributed to mental illness. Ultimately, however, the facts of the Watergate scandal vindicated her and garnered her the label "The Cassandra of Watergate".

She claimed to have been drugged and put under guard during a visit to California after her husband was summoned back to Washington, D.C., in order to prevent her from leaving the hotel or making phone calls to the news media. James McCord confirmed in 1975 that her story was true, as reported in The New York Times. More evidence supporting Mitchell's claims was published in a 2017 news article in Newsweek about the appointment of Stephen B. King, the security agent who abducted Mitchell, as the U.S. ambassador to the Czech Republic. In 2022, Netflix released a documentary titled The Martha Mitchell Effect.

== See also ==
- Adrian Schoolcraft
- Arnold Juklerød
- Argument from ignorance
- False memory
- Gaslighting
- Goldwater rule
- Gustl Mollath
- Psychosis
- Rosemary's Baby (novel)
- Rosenhan experiment
