= Arnold Juklerød =

Norwegian activist (1925–1996)

Arnold Juklerød (8 January 1925 in Drangedal, for a long time living in Kragerø – 25 January 1996 at Aker hospital in Oslo) was a Norwegian construction worker who became known for his conflict with psychiatric institutions in Norway from around 1970 until his death which is other wise known as the "Juklerød-case"

In 1968 he was elected to lead a parent campaign against the closure of Holtane school in Kragerø, where his youngest daughter was to begin. He claimed that the closure was in violation of the law, acquired a typewriter and sent many letters to the newspapers.

Three years after the parental action campaign, a dispute with his wife concluded in his forced hospitalization in psychiatric care on the 22nd of November 1971. He was diagnosed with "Paranoia 297.0, Religious quarrelsome type" and was forcibly medicated with drugs Trilafon, Akineton and Peragit.

With this he began a struggle with psychiatric institutions, which cost him his job, property and family. On 11 August 1995 Arnold Juklerød received an unconditional admission from the Ministry of Education and Research that his "delusions" in the Holtane case had been correct.

Juklerød received considerable media attention, and it is claimed that his involvement has led to reforms in psychiatry in Norway.

When Arnold Juklerød was discharged in 1985, he refused to leave the hospital area, because his diagnosis "incurable and severely mentally ill" was not annulled.

Until his death, he stayed in the hospital area in a tent or a shack, as a protest against Norwegian psychiatry.

== Juklerød-case aftermath ==
=== Symptom-free sickness (1988) ===
It is claimed that Arnold Juklerød was healthy before his forced hospitalization. A commission that was appointed in 1988 claimed that in the worst case he suffered from an "insanity without symptoms."

The behavioural therapist Arild Karlsen commented on this diagnosis as follows: "The 06/20/88 there emerged a straight psychiatric declaration in the Oslo Magistrates Court. It was signed by the psychiatrist and the police doctor Karl-Ewert Hornman and psychiatrist and physician Njål Madland. The third psychiatrist who took payment for participating in the judicial observation, Chief doctor Harald Ø. Reppesgaard, never got the declaration for signature. "

=== A new commission of investigation was demanded (1996) ===
On the 7 September 1995 attorney Knut Rognlien wrote in a press release:

In a letter dated 11 August 1995 from the Ministry of Education and Research (KUF) to Arnold Juklerød, which admitted that the school authorities acted contrary to law when Holtane elementary school district in Kragerø were closed in 1962–1968. ... In his capacity as the chairman of the Action Committee against the closure of Holtane School, Arnold Juklerød pointed out the aforementioned conditions already in 1968. ... Precisely these claims were cited as evidence that he suffered from "untreatable paranoid delusions" when he was forcibly hospitalized. ... The person who protested and was fully complying with the law, was not taken seriously, but defined away as a psychiatric case. The is giving force to the suspicion that psychiatry also in Norway has been used on political grounds against the opposition and dissidents. The Ministry's new review of the case makes it necessary to submit this case for public scrutiny ... The case also shows that it is necessary to draw attention to how public officials meet ordinary people who protest against abuse.

On 14 March 1996 Erling Folkvord from the Red Electoral Alliance presented a private proposal to the Stortinget (Parliament) to appoint a commission of inquiry of the Juklerød case. In the report from the Parliamentary Committee on Justice of 9 May 1996 Proposition 186 (1995–96), according to the preamble:

Stortinget requests that the Government appoint a commission of inquiry to examine all aspects of the Juklerød case and connections to the Holtane school district case. It is necessary that the Commission gets the broadest possible composition so that both the legal, human rights and psychiatric aspects are discussed.

92 of Stortinget's 165 members voted on the proposal on 31 May 1996. The proposal was defeated by 86 votes to six. Those who voted for an investigation, other than Erling Folkvord, was Børre Rønningen (Socialist Left Party), John D. Gløtvold (the Center Party), John Dale (the Center Party), Kjell Engebretsen (The Norwegian Labour Party) and Trond Mathisen (The Norwegian Labour Party).

Rapporteur was Jan Simonsen from the Progress Party. The majority's justification to outvote the proposal was, according to Simonsen, that in 1995, there were 725 applications for compensation ex gratia ("Billighetserstatning") from people who "feel unreasonably treated by the public service" and that they couldn't "pick out a single case of one individual".

== Juklerød case files made public (2002) ==
On 28 February 2002, a critic of Norwegian psychiatry was reported to the police by the Norwegian Data Protection Authority's president Georg Apenes, for posting Juklerød's medical records on the Internet, something which was desired by the deceased. The journal was published on 25 January 2002, the sixth anniversary of Juklerød's death, and led to police raid and seizure of computer equipment.

On 8 November 2005, a bust of Arnold Juklerød was erected at the Gaustad Hospital.

== See also ==
- Martha Mitchell effect
