= Martha Mitchell =

Political socialite and Watergate whistleblower (1918–1976)

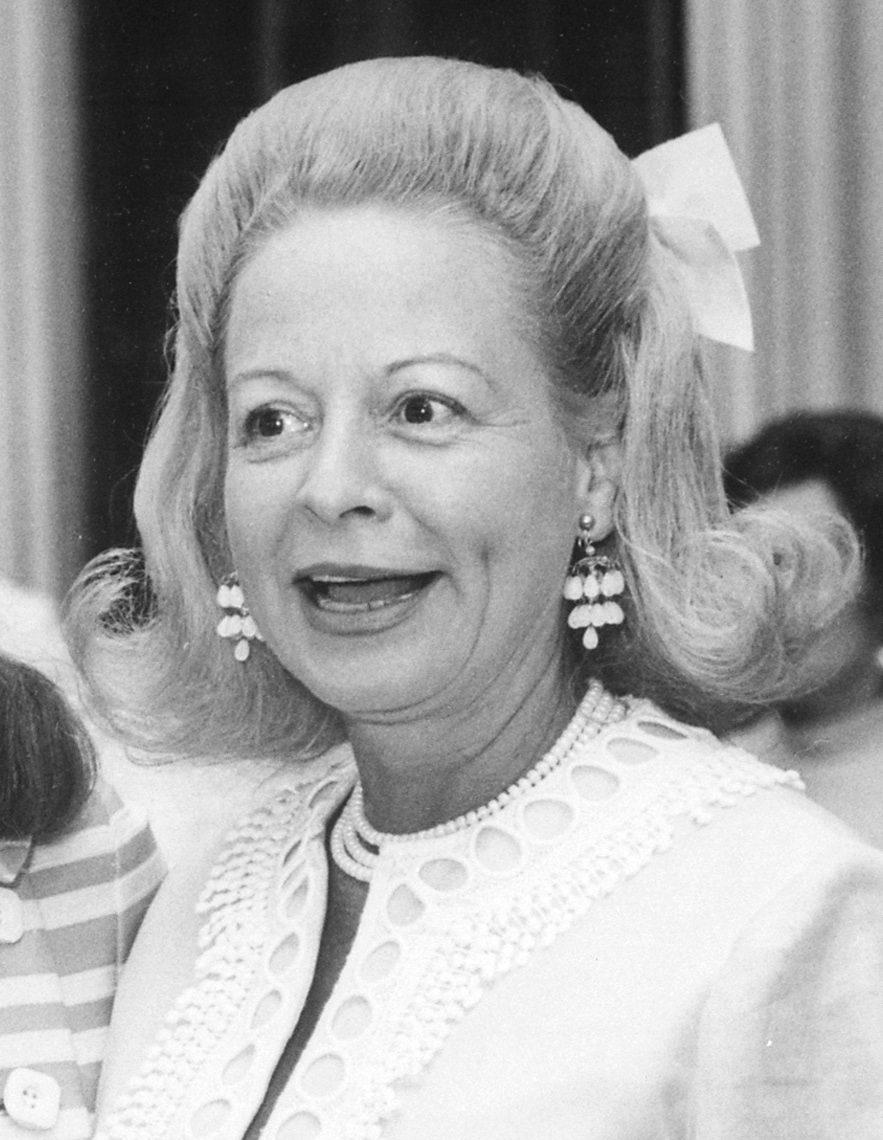
- Mitchell in July 1969
- Born: Martha Elizabeth Beall; September 2, 1918; Pine Bluff, Arkansas, U.S.
- Died: May 31, 1976 (aged 57); New York City, U.S.
- Education: Stephens College, Missouri; University of Arkansas, Fayetteville; University of Miami (BA)
- Known for: Watergate scandal Martha Mitchell effect
- Spouses: Clyde Jennings, Jr. (m. 1946; div. 1957) John N. Mitchell (m. 1957; sep. 1973)
- Children: 2

Martha Elizabeth Beall Mitchell (September 2, 1918 – May 31, 1976) was an American socialite and the wife of John N. Mitchell, United States Attorney General under President Richard Nixon. Her public comments and interviews during the Watergate scandal were frank and revealing.

== Early life and education ==
Martha Elizabeth Beall Jennings Mitchell was born in Pine Bluff, Arkansas, on September 2, 1918, the only child of cotton broker George V. Beall and drama teacher Arie Beall Ferguson. She recalled later in life that as a child she mostly played with the children of her African-American "mammy", who lived with the Beall family, because other families lived at a distance. As a little girl she sang in a church choir, and her mother hoped she would become an opera singer.

When she graduated from Pine Bluff High School in 1937, her yearbook picture carried the quotation, "I love its gentle warble, I love its gentle flow, I love to wind my tongue up, And I love to let it go." She was dyslexic, and struggled to read aloud. She was fascinated by the arts, and dreamt of becoming an actress, attended Stephens College in Columbia, Missouri, and studied acting under Maude Adams, but her family would not allow it.

She eventually transferred to the University of Arkansas at Fayetteville, joined Chi Omega and transferred the following year to the University of Miami. At the University of Miami, she dated Sonny Capone and met Al Capone, and was president of Sigma Iota Chi. She ultimately received a Bachelor of Arts in history. After graduation, she was a seventh-grade teacher for a year in Mobile, Alabama, but left teaching after she decided she "despised" it. She returned to Pine Bluff in 1945 and, after World War II, she began work as a secretary at the Pine Bluff Arsenal. She was soon transferred (along with her boss, Brigadier General Augustin Mitchell Prentiss) to Washington, D.C.

In Washington, she met Clyde Jennings, Jr., a U.S. Army officer from Lynchburg, Virginia. They married on October 5, 1946, in Pine Bluff and moved to Rye, New York. Soon after they wed, her husband was honorably discharged and became a traveling handbag salesman. With Jennings, she had a son, Clyde Jay Jennings in 1947, later a GAO investigator. Jennings spent a lot of time away from home, which (according to Mitchell) led to the couple's separation on May 18, 1956, and eventual divorce on August 1, 1957.

She once said as soon as she met John N. Mitchell that she was "impressed with his suaveness and intellect". They married on December 30, 1957, settling in Rye, New York. Her new husband worked as a lawyer in Manhattan, earning US$250,000 a year and the couple purchased a home on the grounds of the Apawamis Club. In 1961, the Mitchells had a daughter, Marty. Though not Catholics, the Mitchells enrolled their daughter in Catholic school, which Mitchell believed had superior discipline.

== Watergate scandal ==
John Mitchell's and Richard Nixon's professional careers converged when, on New Year's Eve 1966, their law offices combined to become Nixon Mudge Rose Guthrie Alexander and Mitchell. Although their status as friends is debated, when Nixon was elected president in 1968 he appointed John Mitchell as his Attorney General. The position necessitated that the family move to Washington, D.C., and their home in the fashionable Watergate complex was estimated at the time to be worth US$140,000.

Mitchell first came to national attention after she remarked to a television reporter that the Washington, D.C., peace demonstrations held in November 1969 reminded her husband of the Russian Revolution. The statement increased her notoriety and coverage in the media. Mitchell had the custom of having an evening drink and then calling reporters with political gossip or information she had gleaned while rifling through her husband's papers or eavesdropping on his conversations. During this time, Mitchell's renown as an outspoken socialite grew, and she made regular appearances on television talk shows and variety shows, such as Laugh-In. (Note: Martha's appearance on Laugh-In on YouTube)

By November 1970, a Gallup poll indicated that 76 percent of Americans recognized who she was, and she was featured on the cover of Time in an issue about the most influential women of Washington. Her reputation for frank and uncensored talk that was generally in support of Republican issues led to her being nicknamed "Martha the Mouth" or "The Mouth of the South".

Nixon selected John to head the Committee to Re-Elect the President (commonly abbreviated to CRP, or the pejorative "CREEP") for the 1972 campaign. During the campaign Mitchell had begun to complain to her media contacts that the campaign had engaged in "dirty tricks" to win the election. A week before the June 1972 burglary of the DNC headquarters in the Watergate office building, the Mitchells had traveled to Newport Beach, California, to attend a series of fundraising events. While there, Mitchell's husband received a phone call about the incident and immediately held a press conference denying any CRP involvement.

Encouraging her to remain in California, Mitchell's husband returned to Washington. Meanwhile, John Mitchell enlisted their security agent, former FBI agent Steve King, to prevent her from learning about the break-in or contacting reporters. Despite these efforts, the following week, Mitchell acquired a copy of the Los Angeles Times, learning that James W. McCord Jr., the security director of CRP and her daughter's bodyguard and driver, was among those arrested. This detail conflicted with the White House's official story that the break-in was unrelated to CRP, and raised her suspicions. Mitchell unsuccessfully made attempts to contact her husband by phone, eventually telling one of his aides that her next call would be to the press.

=== June 1972 kidnapping and vindication ===
The following Thursday, June 22, Mitchell made a late-night phone call to Helen Thomas of United Press International, reportedly Mitchell's favorite reporter. Mitchell informed Thomas of her intention to leave her husband until he resigned from CRP. The phone call, however, abruptly ended. When Thomas called back, the hotel operator told her that Mitchell was "indisposed" and would not be able to talk. Thomas then called Mitchell's husband. Seemingly unconcerned, John Mitchell told Thomas "[Martha] gets a little upset about politics, but she loves me and I love her and that's what counts."

In her subsequent report of the incident, Thomas said that it was apparent someone had taken the phone from Mitchell's hand and the woman could be heard saying "You just get away." Thomas's account was widely covered in the news, and many media outlets made efforts to find Mitchell for an interview. A few days later, Marcia Kramer, a veteran crime reporter of the New York Daily News, tracked Mitchell to the Westchester Country Club in Rye, New York. Kramer found "a beaten woman" who had "incredible" black and blue marks on her arms.

In the first of many interviews, Mitchell related how in the week following the Watergate burglary, she had been held captive in that country club and it was King who had pulled the phone cord from the wall. After several attempts to escape from the balcony, she was physically accosted by five men and was left needing stitches. Herbert W. Kalmbach, Nixon's personal lawyer, was summoned to the hotel and he decided to call for a doctor to inject her with a tranquilizer. The incident left her fearing for her life.

Although the Watergate burglary was the leading story, her reports were relegated to human-interest stories in major newspapers, including The Times, The Washington Post, and The New York Daily News. Nixon aides, to discredit Mitchell, told the press that she had a drinking problem, which was true. They suggested that she was convalescing in Silver Hill Hospital, a psychiatric facility in Connecticut.

Initially, Mitchell began contacting reporters to defend him when her husband's role in the scandal became known. She believed him to be a "fall guy" and encouraged him to turn against the President. Soon after the burglary, John resigned, citing his desire to spend more time with his family as the reason. In the meantime, corruption in the GOP had moved sharply into focus for the outspoken Martha.

In May 1973, she provided sworn testimony in a deposition at the offices of attorney Henry B. Rothblatt in connection with the Democratic Party's US$6.4 million civil suit against the CRP. The Mitchells separated in September 1973, with John suddenly moving out of the family home with their daughter. On January 1, 1975, he was convicted of perjury, obstruction of justice, and conspiracy for his involvement in the Watergate break-in; he served 19 months in a federal prison. They never saw each other again.

Because of her involvement in the scandal, she was discredited and abandoned by most of her family, except for her son, intermittently. It was not until February 1975 that McCord, having been convicted for his role in the Watergate burglary, admitted that Mitchell was, in his words, "basically kidnapped" and corroborated her story. He further asserted that H. R. Haldeman, as well as other top Nixon aides, had been "jealous" of her popularity in the media and had sought ways to embarrass her. Nixon later told interviewer David Frost in 1977 that Martha was a distraction to John Mitchell, such that no one was minding the store, and "If it hadn't been for Martha Mitchell, there'd have been no Watergate." King denies the kidnapping allegations and was never charged.

Garrett Graff, author of Watergate: A New History, said that Mitchell's status as a whistleblower was ignored largely due to the misogyny of the era, resulting in her being written out of history. He has said that Mitchell "warned America about what was about to envelop the country, and she was ignored. She deserves a much bigger role in the way we tell the story of Watergate."

== Personal life ==
Mitchell was Presbyterian and, while in New York, attended Marble Collegiate Church. She began to write her memoirs in 1973, but fearing it would mean she would get no money from her husband, never signed a contract. In April 1974, she got a short-lived job as the guest host of the program Panorama on Washington's WTTG; it only lasted a week.

=== Illness and death ===
In 1975, Mitchell fell ill. As her health declined, a small circle of friends that included her reporter friend and biographer Winzola McLendon visited her. Her lawyer, in an ongoing alimony dispute, described her as "desperately ill, without funds and without friends". Her son cared for her and served as her occasional spokesman. In her final days, Mitchell subsisted on donations sent by sympathetic supporters.

Suffering the advanced stages of multiple myeloma, on May 31, 1976, Mitchell slipped into a coma and died at Memorial Sloan Kettering Hospital in New York City. She was 57 years old. Her funeral service was held at First Presbyterian Church. An anonymous donor sent a large arrangement of flowers that spelled "Martha was right."

She was buried in the Bellwood Cemetery in Pine Bluff with her mother and grandparents. Her daughter Marty and husband John Mitchell attended the burial, albeit arriving late to the service. It was reported that John Mitchell, because he was still legally her husband, closed the service to the public and only a handful of mourners attended. Despite John Mitchell's actions to keep crowds away, Pine Bluff residents, fans, and the press nonetheless lined the streets and area surrounding the cemetery.

== Public image ==
A November 1970 Gallup poll placed the public's opinion of her at 33% unfavorable to 43% favorable. She was known for her glamorous but "girly" fashion. Despite her fame as an outsized personality, those who knew her said she was often anxious before attending parties or public events, clutching her friend's arm, trembling, or even weeping.

She refused to curtsy to Queen Elizabeth II at a garden party in July 1971, saying, "I feel that an American citizen should not bow to foreign monarchs." Scotland's Earl of Lindsay, a member of the Queen's Body Guard for Scotland, wrote Mitchell a letter of reprimand, and in a statement to the press said, "There is always hope she may learn some manners. She is a stupid woman. If she is going to shout her mouth off like that, she is bound to get shouted at."

Myra MacPherson of The Washington Post wrote that "To many she was a brazen and bombastic woman, to others she was a heroine who attacked a liberal permissiveness they felt had brought chaos to the land." The National Review said:

Martha Mitchell brought to [the Nixon Administration] a welcome touch of zaniness and genuine good humor. Seizing on a rare good thing, the press tended to exploit her. What originally had been innocent japes became media events. During the Watergate furor, her abortive TV career proved to be another and finally pitiable example of the capacity of the media to exploit and consume the vulnerable.

== Legacy ==
Three years after Mitchell's death, Washington newswoman and Mitchell-collaborator Winzola McLendon released a biography titled Martha: The Life of Martha Mitchell.

Mitchell's birthplace and childhood home were added to the National Register of Historic Places in 1978. A segment of U.S. Route 79 in Pine Bluff is designated the Martha Mitchell Expressway, and a bust of her at the Pine Bluff Civic Center bears a plaque reading "Ye shall know the truth and the truth shall make you free."

In 2022 Bob Woodward and Carl Bernstein confirmed that in the spring of 1974 Mitchell had invited them to examine papers left behind by John Mitchell in their New York apartment. She is quoted as having said: "Please nail him. I hope you get the bastard."

== In popular culture ==
Lily Tomlin's 1971 comedy album This Is a Recording includes the track "Mrs. Mitchell", in which she imagines her character Ernestine conversing with Martha Mitchell.

A one-woman play about Mitchell, Dirty Tricks by John Jeter, appeared off-Broadway in 2004.

In the 1995 film Nixon directed by Oliver Stone, Madeline Kahn plays Mitchell, who has a small but pivotal role in the Watergate section of the film.

The first episode of the podcast Slow Burn, entitled "Martha", chronicled her role in the Watergate scandal in 2017.

Martha's role in the Watergate scandal was told in the 13th episode of the sixth season of Drunk History by John Early, where she was portrayed by Vanessa Bayer.

Gaslit, a political thriller TV series based on the Slow Burn podcast, aired in 2022, starring Julia Roberts as Martha and Sean Penn as John Mitchell.

The "Martha Mitchell effect", in which a psychiatrist mistakenly or willfully identifies a patient's true but extraordinary claims as delusions, was named after her.

She is briefly mentioned by Richard Nixon as being a nuisance in Fantastic Four #123 published in June 1972.

Captain Sensible's 1982 album Women and Captains First includes the song "Martha the Mouth".

== Filmography ==
- Panorama (1974) – guest host
- The Martha Mitchell Effect (2022) – documentary of archival footage explores Mitchell's story as it pertains to the Watergate Scandal

== See also ==
- Gaslit
- Martha Mitchell effect
- David Lindesay-Bethune, 15th Earl of Lindsay#Views on curtsying
