= Gaustad Hospital =

Psychiatric hospital in Oslo, Norway

Coordinates: 59°57′3.26″N 10°43′13.34″E

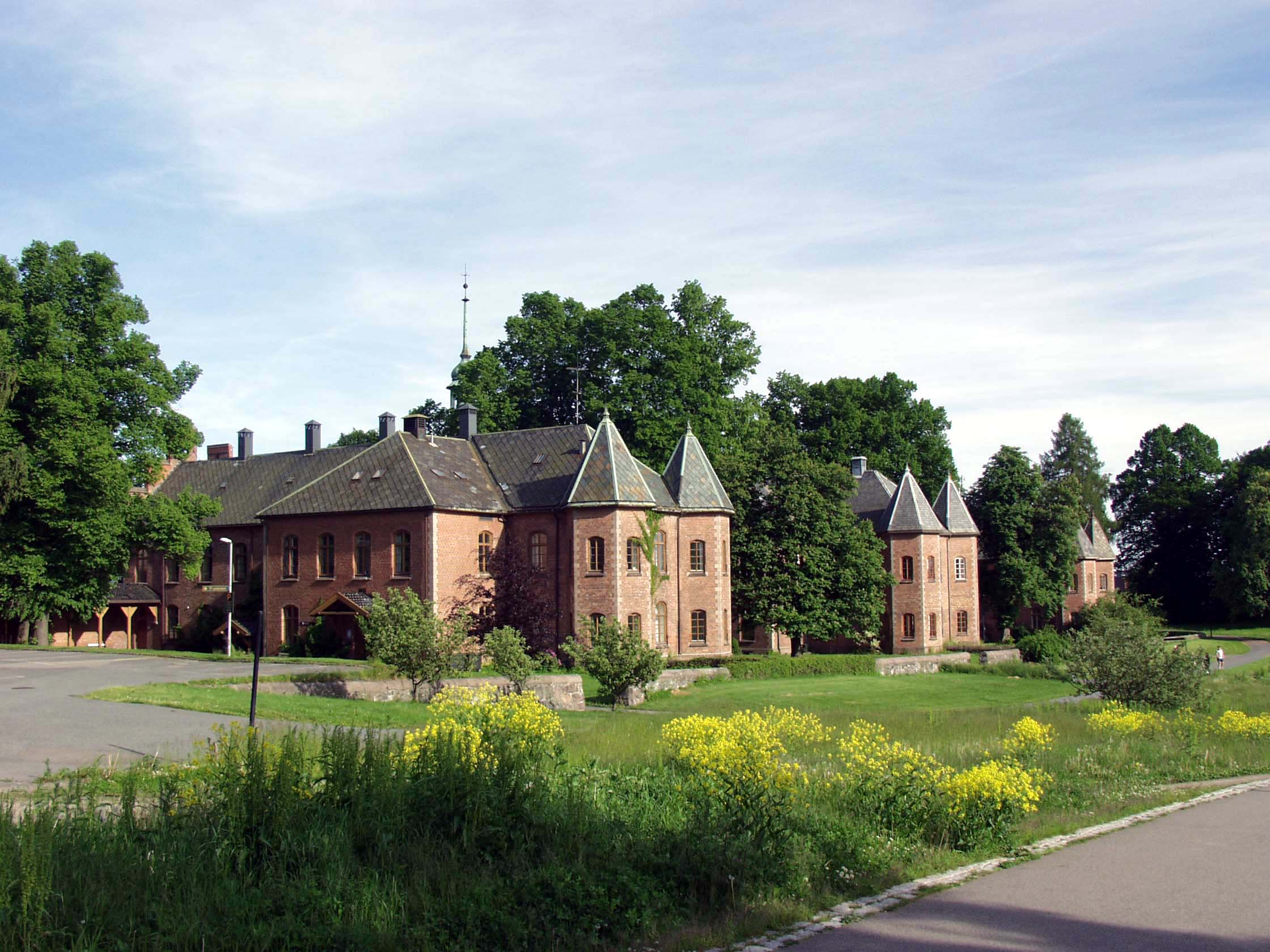
Gaustad Hospital

Gaustad Hospital (Norwegian: Gaustad sykehus) is a psychiatric hospital in the neighborhood of Gaustad in Oslo, Norway. Founded in 1855, it is Norway's oldest purpose-built psychiatric hospital. It opened as the nation's first insane asylum designed according to the guidelines in the Insane Act of 1848 (Sinnssykeloven). The facility was planned by Herman Wedel Major, based on the model of foreign institutions, and the building complex was designed by architect Heinrich Ernst Schirmer.

During the occupation of Norway in 1940–1945, the hospital's workers, knowing German soldiers would send their patients to concentration camps, devised a plan to save them. For months, they collected urine in buckets. When the day came that the soldiers knocked on the door, they threw the urine on every radiator and heater, creating a tremendous stink. The soldiers left and didn't return, and the patients' lives were saved.

Arnold Juklerød, then a father and construction worker, was forcibly admitted to the Gaustad Hospital in 1971. He was lobotomized and, at times, denied contact with the outside world. (He alleged psychiatric abuse.) The level of care he received from Gaustad's leading psychiatrists became the focus of widespread media attention.

The hospital was owned by the State until it was taken over by the City of Oslo in 1985. Since 1996, Gaustad Hospital been part of Aker University Hospital; and since January 2009, Aker University Hospital has been part of Oslo University Hospital, a subsidiary of the Southern and Eastern Norway Regional Health Authority.
