= The Slowskys =

Bill Slowsky in front of his computer, attempting to download a file using his DSL connection.

The Slowskys are a national television advertising campaign for Comcast Cable's Xfinity broadband Internet service. The ads feature an animatronic turtle couple, Bill and Karolyn Slowsky. The ads are based on the idea that DSL, which Xfinity claims is slower than their service, is only fast enough for people who like things very slow. In the television ads, the two turtles are usually shown together explaining why they are so happy with DSL service, and that if they got Xfinity, it would be far too fast for them.

Comedian Andrew Donnelly is the voice of Bill Slowsky and actress (and former member of The Groundlings) Rachael Harris provides the voice for Karolyn. Son Bill Slowsky Jr. (featured in a reboot campaign starting in May 2019) is voiced by musician Lucas Grabeel.

The characters were created by Goodby Silverstein & Partners of San Francisco, produced by RSA, puppeteered by Stan Winston. The campaign won the gold Effie Award in 2007. The puppeteered turtles were later turned into CGI turtles for the 2019 reboot.

The entire Comcast Slowskys portfolio is on the Effie.com website, but users are required to register or purchase a subscription in order to unlock some of the material.

== Advertisements ==
In the 2011 ad series, Bill Slowsky Jr. was introduced. A couple commercials compared Verizon Fios and AT&T Internet, and Qwest buying CenturyLink. These were only aired on TV and shown on other portfolios. There were also comic strips of the Slowskys during this period.

In the 2013 ad series, this time targeted to Comcast Business, the Slowskys, Bill and Karolyn, have a diner filled with DSL Internet. This also introduced Kevin, one of the workers. This series consisted of only two commercials.

In the 2019 ad series, which serves to promote World Turtle Day, Bill Jr. reveals that he is a big fan of the speed and convenience offered by Xfinity and its service-related smartphone app, leading to his father ending each ad with blunt dismissals (such as "I'll pass" and "I'd rather not") of his son's impassioned advocacy for added speed. The official Xfinity Twitter account got taken over by Bill Slowsky Jr. on the same day.

== Website ==
TheSlowskys.com was a character blog on which everything slow is celebrated. Recently however, the blog was taken down and replaced by a peaceful, permanent flash widget that included their commercials, download links, and merchandise. Karolyn's blog was replaced with Karolyn's Korner for the flash widget.

When the Slowsky fad reached its peak, the Slowskys Website created a fictional campaign in which the Slowsky couple traveled around their block in an old fashioned political circuit. On top of their vehicle, multiple bullhorns would amplify the Slowsky's voices so that people could hear them. The advertising video showed the Slowskys in the vehicle, and with Bill screaming "BE STILL WITH BILL!", much to Karolyn's annoyance, with "Hail to the Chief" playing in the background. The party even offered membership cards, sold merchandise, and requested slogans for their platform.

== In popular culture/Parodies ==
Canadian cable provider Shaw Communications produced a knockoff of The Slowskys called The Snailskis. Another knockoff of The Slowskys is the No Shells Pistachios promotion which is similar to The Slowskys.
