= Juiceboxxx =

American rapper

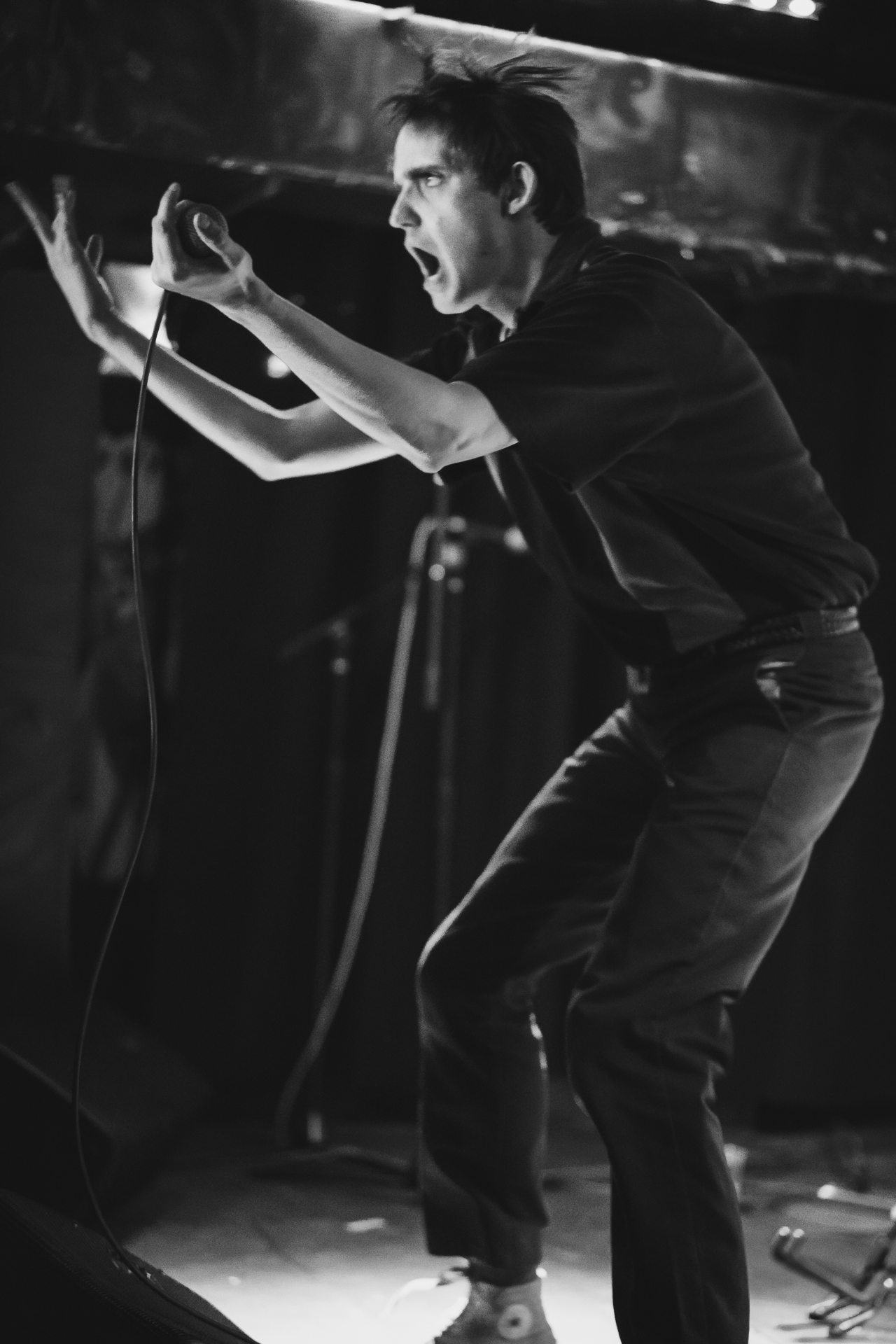
- Juiceboxxx at SXSW 2019

Background information
- Origin: Milwaukee, Wisconsin, U.S.
- Genres: Alternative hip hop
- Years active: 2001-2020
- Label: Thunder Zone
- Website: www.thunderzone.biz

Juiceboxxx is an American rapper, producer, and label-owner based in Milwaukee, Wisconsin.

== Career ==
Juiceboxxx released his first album in 2005: R U There God?? Itz Me Juiceboxxx on Vicious Pop Records.

In 2010, Juiceboxxx released two mixtapes: Thunder Zone Volume One, a 20-track mixtape featuring many guests, and Journeyman From The Heartland, a 10-track mixtape recorded on the road with a variety of producers from Dillon Francis, L-Vis 1990, BzukaJoe, and others.

In 2012, Juiceboxxx released I Don't Wanna Go Into The Darkness on his newly founded Thunder Zone label.

In 2017, Juiceboxxx released Freaked Out American Loser on Dangerbird Records, a 9 track album; alongside, a short documentary that follows him on tour and examines his musical journey.

In 2022, Juiceboxxx took to social media to announce that Juiceboxxx is no longer active with the release of a new single under the name RUSTBELT.

He writes a weekly newsletter roundup of music called The Boxxx Report.

=== Thunder Zone Entertainment ===
Juiceboxxx founded the Thunder Zone Entertainment label in 2011, releasing a seven-inch vinyl single, "Relaxin'," by G-Side with a B side featuring the song "Impossible (Javelin Remix)," featuring Geographer and Jhi Ali. The label releases music in many formats from vinyl, CD, cassette tapes, MP3s, to WAVs and others. The label has released music by Schwarz, Dogs In Ecstasy, Odwalla88, DJ Lucas And Gods Wisdom, and others.

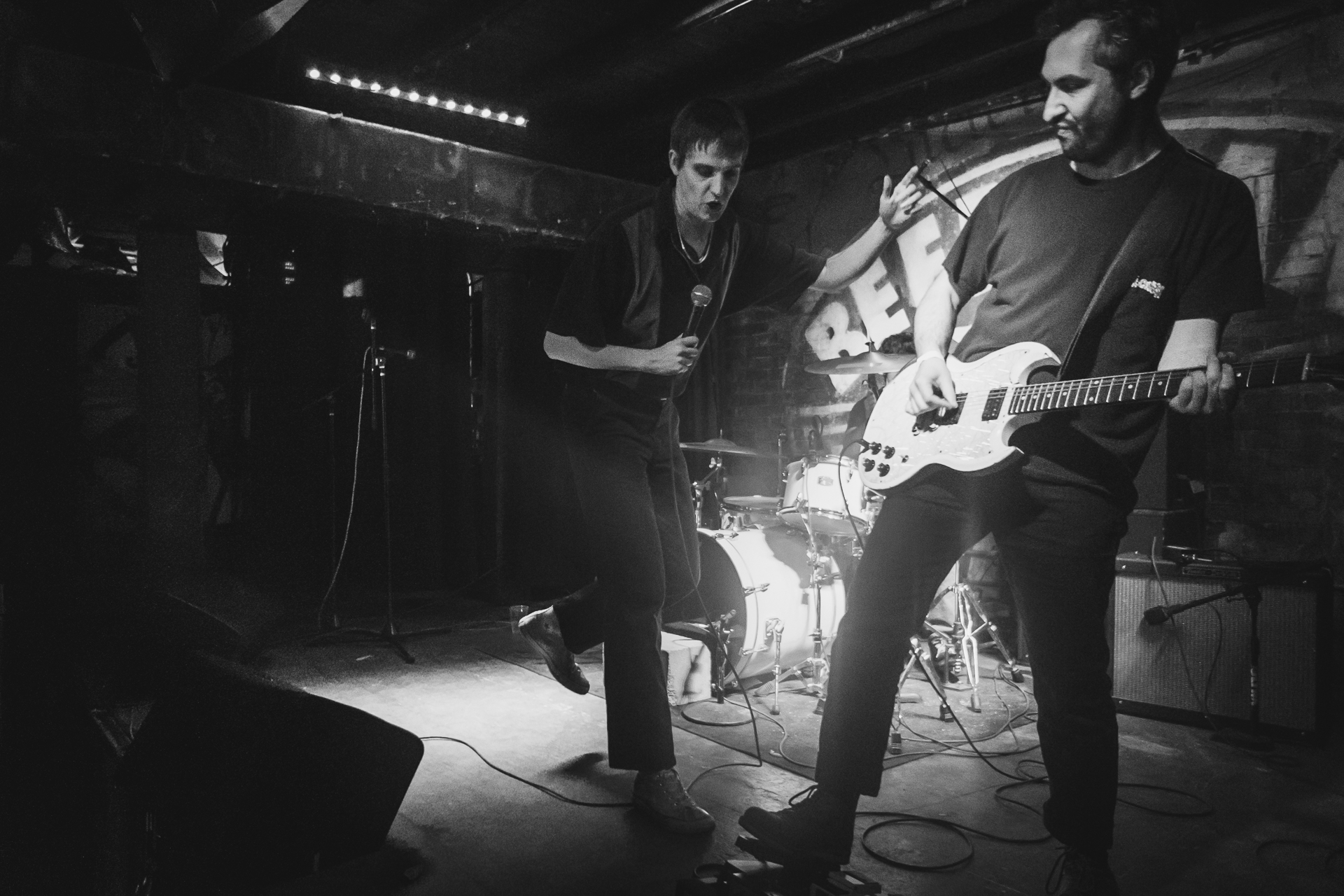
Juiceboxxx and Willy Dintenfass at SXSW 2019 photo by Paul Hudson

== Media attention ==
Leon Neyfakh wrote a book profiling Juiceboxxx called The Next Next Level: A Story of Rap, Friendship, and Almost Giving Up. Neyfakh was introduced to Juiceboxxx by Milwaukee-based musician Willy Dintenfass. Dintenfass plays in Juiceboxxx's band.

In 2016, Pitchfork in a review of Gods Wisdom's Self Restraint, stated the album failed to access Juiceboxxx and Schwarz's confidence.
