= The Next Next Level =

The Next Next Level: A Story of Rap, Friendship, and Almost Giving Up
- First edition
- Author: Leon Neyfakh
- Language: English
- Genre: Non-fiction
- Publisher: Melville House Publishing
- Publication date: July 15, 2015
- Pages: 224
- ISBN: 978-1-61219-446-2

The Next Next Level: A Story of Rap, Friendship, and Almost Giving Up is a book by Leon Neyfakh about rapper Juiceboxxx. It was released on July 15, 2015.

== Synopsis ==
The book tells the story of a young, white rapper from Wisconsin, Juiceboxxx, who writer Leon Neyfakh met when he was in the eighth grade.

== Reception ==
The book received mostly positive reviews. The Kirkus Review called it "Strangely sad and triumphant."
