= Slow Burn (podcast) =

History podcast

- Cover art for the second season
- Genre: History; Drama; Political Commentary
- Format: Audio
- Language: English

Cast and voices
- Hosted by: Leon Neyfakh (seasons 1-2); Joel Anderson (seasons 3,6,8); Josh Levin (seasons 4, 10); Noreen Malone (season 5); Susan Matthews (seasons 7, 11); Christina Cauterucci (season 9)

Production
- Production: Andrew Parsons
- Length: Typically 45 to 60 minutes

Publication
- No. of episodes: Main series: 45; Bonus: 9
- Original release: November 28, 2017

Related
- Adaptations: Gaslit (TV series); Impeachment: American Crime Story
- Website: slate.com/podcasts/slow-burn/s1/watergate

Slow Burn is a narrative podcast produced by Slate Plus, a division of Slate. The first two seasons of the podcast are hosted by Leon Neyfakh; the third and sixth seasons of the show are hosted by Joel D. Anderson; and the fourth and fifth seasons are hosted by Josh Levin and Noreen Malone, respectively.

The first season is about the Watergate scandal featuring interviews with people involved in the story. The second is about the Impeachment of Bill Clinton featuring an interview with Linda Tripp, among others. The third season covers the growing tension between rappers Tupac Shakur and The Notorious B.I.G. in the 1990s. The fourth season covers the rise and fall of David Duke as a political figure in Louisiana in the 1980s and 1990s. Its fifth season explored the road to the Iraq war and debuted on April 21, 2021. The sixth season, beginning on November 3, 2021, covered the police beating of Rodney King and the subsequent L.A. riots. The seventh season was about Roe v. Wade and the politics of abortion in the 1970s. Its eighth season, which premiered on May 31, 2023, is about the nomination and confirmation of Clarence Thomas to the Supreme Court. The ninth season covered the 1978 Briggs Initiative which called for the banning of gays and lesbians from working in public schools. This Californian legislation fueled a growing backlash against LGBTQ+ people in all corners of American life.

The podcast premiered on November 28, 2017, and became "one of the top shows on Apple Podcasts."

== Seasons ==
- Season 1: Watergate (8 episodes)
- Season 2: Clinton (Clinton–Lewinsky scandal) (8 episodes)
- Season 3: Biggie and Tupac (9 episodes)
- Season 4: David Duke (6 episodes)
- Season 5: The Road to the Iraq War (8 episodes)
- Season 6: The L.A. Riots (8 episodes)
- Season 7: Roe v. Wade (4 episodes)
- Season 8: Becoming Justice Thomas (4 episodes)
- Season 9: Gays Against Briggs (California Proposition 6) (7 episodes)
- Season 10: The Rise of Fox News (between 2000 and 2004)
- Season 11: Becoming Neil Gorsuch

== Reviews ==
Slow Burn received a positive review from Vulture. USA Today named Slow Burn as a "hot" recommended podcast. The New York Times praised Slow Burn and credited Malcolm Gladwell with leading the way by making historic podcasts that focused on neglected aspects of well-known events, like Slow Burn, possible.

The show won Podcast of the Year at the 2019 iHeartRadio Podcast Awards.

== Adaptations ==
=== TV adaptation ===
It was announced in February 2019 that Epix was producing a six-part television series based on the first season Watergate investigation. It premiered on February 16, 2020.

==== Episodes ====
No.	Title	Directed by	Written by	Original release date	U.S. viewers (millions)
1	"Martha"	Unknown	Unknown	February 16, 2020	N/A
In 1967, the law firms of John N. Mitchell and former 1950s vice president Richard Nixon merge. Martha Mitchell, the wife of the Nixon's attorney general, develops a proclivity for broadcasting her opinions on national television channels. In 1971, Nixon creates the White House Plumbers to stop leaks; E. Howard Hunt heads the unit. Many of these "plumbers" made their way into CREEP (Nixon's 1972 re-election campaign).: Guests: Lesley Stahl, David Greenberg, Roger Stone, John Dean, Caryl Carothers.; Archival footage: The Monkees, Helen Thomas, Barbara Walters.
2	"Losing Ground"	Unknown	Unknown	February 23, 2020	N/A
J. Edgar Hoover passes away six weeks before the Watergate scandal in June 1972. The Kent State shootings resulted in four deaths in May 1970. The Huston Plan was proposed by a Nixon staff member to gather domestic intelligence. Nixon signed the Federal Election Campaign Act which would take effect in April 1972. Before this legislation, large contributions could be made to CREEP or other political campaign committees without a disclosure requirement. Attorney Donald Segretti spearheads a political sabotage operation called "ratfucking".: Guests: John Dean, Peggy Lewis (staff worker on the House Banking Committee for Wright Patman in 1972), Curtis Prins, Connie Chung, Tony Podesta.; Archival footage: Edmund Muskie, Hubert Humphrey, George McGovern (1972 Democratic party nominee), Maurice Stans.
3	"Suspicious Minds"	Unknown	Unknown	March 1, 2020	N/A
Mae Brussell opinionated about the United Airlines Flight 553 crash in December 1972 as a conspiracy theory. Back in 1964, she disputed the Warren Commission conclusion that Lee Harvey Oswald had acted alone. In the 1960s, Operation Peter Pan was intended to bring Cuban minors in the United States. Operation Mongoose was authorized to subvert the Cuban regime after the failed 1961 Bay of Pigs invasion.: Guests: María de Los Angeles Torres, Eugenio Martínez.; Archival footage: Frank Wills, Herbert Porter, Edgar Magnin (rabbi and Mae Brussell's father), Walter Cronkite, John Sirica.
4	"The Hearings"	Unknown	Unknown	March 8, 2020	N/A
Nixon asks John Dean to resign in April 1973. Sam Ervin heads the United States Senate Watergate Committee in May 1973.: Guests: John Dean, Lowell Weicker.; Archival footage: Jeb Magruder, Samuel Dash.
5	"Smoking Gun"	Unknown	Unknown	March 15, 2020	N/A
California Governor Ronald Reagan defends Nixon stating that Nixon had received 60.7% of the votes in the 1972 United States presidential election. Howard Baker was the senior Republican on the Senate Watergate Committee. Fred Thompson served as the minority (Republican) counsel on the Committee. Alexander Butterfield admits to Donald Sanders the existence of a tape recording system in the Oval Office. On August 15, 1973, Nixon delivered a televised address stating that he had no knowledge of the Watergate break-in.: Guests: Scott Armstrong, Gail Sheehy.; Archival footage: Alexander Butterfield, J. Fred Buzhardt, John Stennis#Watergate.
6	"Massacre"	Unknown	Unknown	March 22, 2020	N/A
Elliot Richardson, Nixon's new Attorney General in 1973, appointed a 1960 John F. Kennedy staff named Archibald Cox as the Justice Department Special Prosecutor! In November 1973, a new Department-of-Justice prosecutor Leon Jaworski is appointed.: Guests: Jim Doyle (a special assistant and spokesman for the Watergate prosecutors), Carl B. Feldbaum, Elizabeth Drew, Michael Koncewicz (historian), Elizabeth Holtzman.; Archival footage: Peter W. Rodino, Barbara Jordan, Harold Donohue (& other members of the 93rd House Judiciary Committee).

=== Additional series ===
- Season 1 about the Watergate scandal was also adapted into another television series titled Gaslit on Starz
- Season 2 about Bill Clinton's impeachment was used to inform parts of the third season of American Crime Story on FX

== See also ==
- List of history podcasts
- Political podcast
