= Natural Selection (2011 film) =

2011 film by Robbie Pickering

- Film poster
- Directed by: Robbie Pickering
- Written by: Robbie Pickering
- Produced by: Brion Hambel; Paul Jensen
- Starring: Rachael Harris; Matt O'Leary; John Diehl; Jon Gries
- Cinematography: Steven Capitano Calitri
- Edited by: Michelle Tesoro
- Music by: iZLER; Curt Schneider
- Production company: Best Medicine Productions
- Distributed by: The Cinema Guild
- Release dates: March 13, 2011 (SXSW); March 16, 2012 (United States)
- Running time: 90 minutes
- Country: United States
- Language: English
- Budget: $150,000
- Box office: $55,282

Natural Selection is a 2011 American road comedy-drama film written and directed by Robbie Pickering (in his feature directorial debut). It stars Rachael Harris, Matt O'Leary, John Diehl, and Jon Gries. It follows a devout Christian housewife who discovers that her dying husband has an illegitimate son and sets out on a quixotic journey to find him.

The film had its world premiere at the South by Southwest Film Festival on March 13, 2011, where it won seven awards including the Grand Jury and Audience Awards for Best Narrative Feature. It was theatrically released in the United States on March 16, 2012, by The Cinema Guild. It received positive reviews from critics, who mostly praised Pickering's direction and screenplay, as well as Harris' performance. At the 27th Independent Spirit Awards, it earned two nominations: Best First Feature and Best Female Lead (for Harris).

== Synopsis ==
Linda White, a barren Christian housewife, leads a sheltered existence in suburban Texas. Her world is turned upside-down when she discovers that her dying husband, Abe, has a 23-year-old son through a sperm bank named Raymond living in Florida. Somewhere on the edge of guilt and loneliness, Linda grants Abe's final wish and sets off on a quixotic journey to find Raymond and bring him back before her husband passes away. Along the way, Linda's wonderfully bizarre relationship with Raymond's roommate, an escaped con purporting to be Raymond, will teach her more about herself than she ever imagined possible and force her to come to terms with her troubled past.

== Cast ==
- Rachael Harris as Linda White
- Matt O'Leary as Raymond
- John Diehl as Abe
- Jon Gries as Peter
- Gayland Williams as Sheila
- Stephanie King as Shaunice
- Rob Huebel as Martin
- Bernadette Pérez as Porno Nun
- Drake Dempsey as Porno Priest
- Michael Hyland as Handsome Doctor
- Greg Grosh as Sperm Clinic Doctor
- Loomis Warren as Country Doctor
- Melinda DeKay as Stern Nurse
- Hallie Martin as White Trash Fox

== Production ==
Natural Selection was inspired by Pickering's attempt to depict a woman like his mother and her experience with loneliness, developed while his stepfather was terminally ill with cancer. The film's initial budget was $2 million, but was reduced to $150,000 due to difficulty in securing funding. Principal photography took place on location in Smithville, Texas over the course of 18 days.

== Reception ==
=== Critical response ===
On the review aggregator website Rotten Tomatoes, 74% of 34 critics' reviews are positive. Metacritic, which uses a weighted average, assigned the film a score of 57 out of 100, based on 14 critics, indicating "mixed or average" reviews.

Joe Leydon of Variety described the film as "an engagingly offbeat comedy that respects its characters too much to push too hard for easy laughs, even when those characters risk making complete fools of themselves." Stephen Holden of The New York Times stated, "Aside from Ms. Harris's performance, the main reason to recommend Natural Selection — very conditionally — is that its creator clearly has talent." Betsy Sharkey of the Los Angeles Times called the film "intriguing and intelligent" and praised Harris for her "finely textured performance." Eric Kohn of IndieWire gave it a grade of "B+" and opined, "Despite its flaws, Natural Selection succeeds as a crowd-pleasing, tear-jerking romp." Katie Walsh of IndieWire also rated the film "B+" and wrote, "It wraps up with one of the most satisfying endings of an indie film in years: it is both ambiguous and decidedly not so." Catherine Shoard of The Guardian gave the film 4 out of 5 stars and noted, "Natural Selection ticks all the boxes with a firm grip. Its opening alone is a lovely cinematic coup." Meanwhile, Peter Travers of Rolling Stone gave it 3 out of 5 stars and highlighted, "Harris is just perfect without ever looking down on Linda's faith in God and herself. Her performance earns a special kind of glory." Roger Ebert, writing for his RogerEbert.com website, gave it 3.5 out of 4 stars and commented, "Harris' performance illuminates Natural Selection. […] She's the big reason that Natural Selection is so engaging."

=== Accolades ===
At the 2011 South by Southwest Film Festival, Natural Selection won 7 awards: the Grand Jury Award for Best Narrative Feature, Breakthrough Performances (for Harris and O'Leary), Best Screenplay, Best Editing, Best Score/Music, and the Audience Award for Best Narrative Feature. The film was nominated for Best First Feature and Best Female Lead (for Harris) at the 27th Independent Spirit Awards.
