= Matters of Life and Dating =

- Genre: Romantic comedy
- Based on: Up Front by Linda Dackman
- Teleplay by: Nina Colman
- Directed by: Peter Wellington
- Starring: Ricki Lake; Holly Robinson Peete; Rachael Harris
- Music by: Anton Sanko
- Country of origin: United States
- Original language: English

Production
- Executive producers: Ricki Lake; Salli Newman; Barbara Lieberman
- Producer: Michael Mahoney
- Cinematography: Joel Ransom
- Editor: Susan Shipton
- Running time: 90 minutes
- Production companies: Robert Greenwald Productions; Barbara Lieberman Films; Firebrand Productions

Original release
- Network: Lifetime
- Release: October 22, 2007

Matters of Life and Dating is a 2007 American romantic comedy television film directed by Peter Wellington and written by Nina Colman, based on the 1990 memoir Up Front: Sex and the Post-Mastectomy Woman by Linda Dackman. The film stars Ricki Lake as Dackman, who struggles to re-enter the dating world after being diagnosed with breast cancer and undergoing a mastectomy and breast reconstruction. Holly Robinson Peete and Rachael Harris also star.

The film aired on Lifetime on October 22, 2007.

== Plot ==
Linda is a single woman who must re-enter the dating world after undergoing a mastectomy and breast reconstruction surgery due to cancer.

== Cast ==
- Ricki Lake as Linda Dackman
- Holly Robinson Peete as Nicole Banning
- Rachael Harris as Carla
- Dylan Neal as Guy DeMayo
- Gabriel Hogan as Kevin
- Nigel Bennett as Errol Sager
- Noam Jenkins as Jacques

== Production ==
The film is based on the memoirs of Linda Dackman. Lifetime approached songwriters Kara DioGuardi and James Poyser to write a song, "My Bra" performed by Mýa, for the film.

== Release ==
Matters of Life and Dating premiered on Lifetime Television on October 22, 2007, as part of the channel's "Stop Breast Cancer for Life" campaign.

== Reception ==
Kevin McDonough of the Intelligencer Journal criticized the film, writing that "It's hard to find fault with a movie trying to help women cope with a life-threatening illness, but Linda's plight might be more accessible if she weren't so darned successful and living such a fabulous two-double-latte-a-day existence and having to fend off so many handsome suitors." A reviewer for the Akron Beacon Journal was also critical, as they felt that Lake's performance was one of the film's major flaws.
