= Wesley Brown (writer) =

American writer (born 1945)

- Born: 1945 (age 80–81)
- Occupations: Writer, playwright and professor
- Notable work: Tragic Magic (1978)

Wesley Brown (born 1945) is an American writer, playwright, and professor. He is best known for his books Tragic Magic and Darktown Strutters.

Tragic Magic, Brown's first novel, published in 1978, received strong reviews. Kirkus Reviews wrote that Brown's "sentences end in unexpected pretzels, they blurt and croon; his gift is improvisatory and brassy." James W. Coleman, writing in Black American Literature Forum, thought that Brown did "a brilliant job of maintaining the tension and vitality of the novel's language, which is a genuine tour de force." The novel, which follows a young man recently released from prison for refusing military induction, has been described as a "jazz-narrative". Tragic Magic was edited by Toni Morrison at Random House. The book was reissued in hardcover by McSweeney's in 2021, part of the publisher's "Of the Diaspora" series spotlighting important works in Black literature.

In 1994, Brown released his second novel, about a minstrel show performer. The New York Times praised Darktown Strutters, writing that by "combining the simple prose of a folk tale with the meta-psychology of a philosopher, Wesley Brown has created a vivid, disturbing work of the historical imagination." Life During Wartime, Brown's 1992 play, was called a "complex, intelligent and thought-provoking drama" by The New York Times.

He has served as a judge for the PEN/Faulkner Award.

Brown has taught at Rutgers University and Bard College at Simon's Rock.

== Selected bibliography ==
- Tragic Magic (1978) (Reissued 2021, McSweeney's; hardcover ISBN 978-1-944-21198-1, with a new introduction by the author)
- Boogie Woogie and Booker T (1987)
- Life During Wartime (1992)
- Darktown Strutters (1994)
- Push Comes to Shove (2009)
- Dance of the Infidels (2017)
- Blue in Green (2022)
