= Frank Wills (security guard) =

American security guard who foiled the break-in that triggered the Watergate scandal

- Born: February 4, 1948; Savannah, Georgia, U.S.
- Died: September 27, 2000 (aged 52); Medical College of Georgia, Augusta, Georgia, U.S.
- Education: Job Corps
- Occupation: Security guard
- Known for: Foiling the 1972 DNC break-in, which triggered the Watergate scandal

Frank Wills (February 4, 1948 – September 27, 2000) was an American security guard best known for his role in foiling the June 17, 1972 break-in at the Democratic National Committee inside the Watergate complex in Washington, D.C. Then 24, Wills called the police after discovering that locks at the complex had been tampered with. Five men were arrested inside the Democratic headquarters, which they had planned to bug. The arrests triggered the Watergate scandal and eventually the resignation of President Richard M. Nixon in 1974.

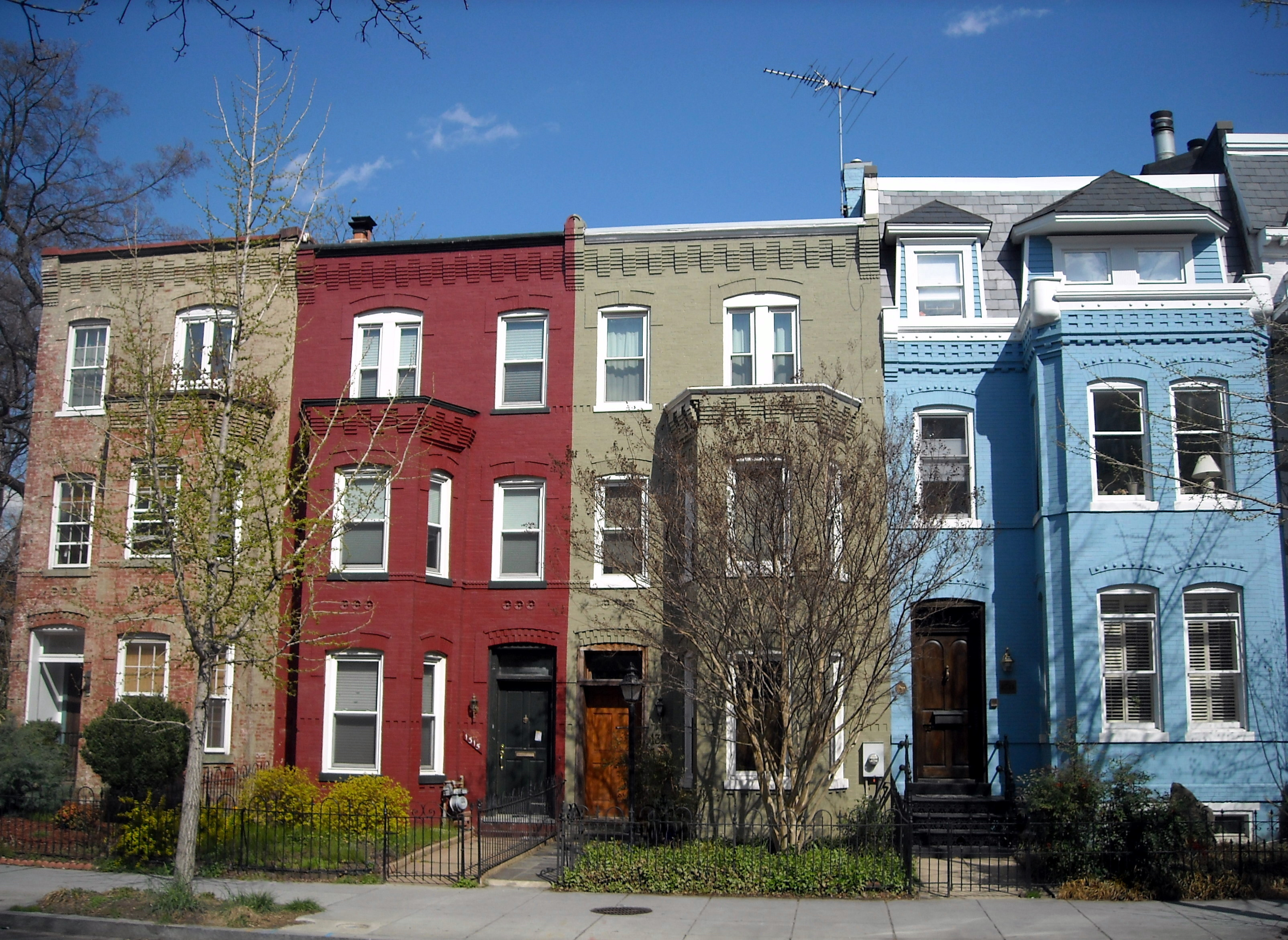
Former residence (red building) of Frank Wills, located in the Dupont Circle neighborhood of Washington, D.C.

Although hailed as a hero, Wills did not receive a promotion or much financial reward. Later, he had difficulty finding work. He did media appearances and played himself in the 1976 film All the President's Men, but spent much of his life jobless and in poverty.

== Early life ==
Wills, who was of African American heritage, was born in Savannah, Georgia, United States, on February 4, 1948. His parents separated when he was a child and he was primarily raised by his mother, Margie.

After dropping out of high school in 11th grade, Wills studied heavy machine operations in Battle Creek, Michigan and earned his equivalency degree from the Job Corps. He found an assembly-line job working for Ford in Detroit, Michigan. He later had to give up his assembly-line job due to health issues, namely asthma. Wills then traveled to Washington, D.C., and worked at a few hotels before landing a job as a security guard at the Watergate hotel.

== Watergate hotel ==
In June 1972, Wills, at the age of 24, was working as a private security guard at the Watergate office building on the shores of the Potomac River. This was the location of the Democratic National Committee (DNC) headquarters. In the year that Wills had worked there, there had been only one attempted burglary. In fact, it was considered so safe that security officers in the building carried around only a can of mace.

In the early hours of the morning of June 17, Wills noticed a piece of duct tape on one of the door locks when he was making his first round. The tape was placed over the latch bolt to prevent the door from latching shut. He removed the tape and continued on his patrol. Thirty minutes later, Wills returned to the door and noticed there was more tape on the same door. Without hesitation, Wills rushed up to the lobby telephone and asked for the Second Precinct police. The police turned off the elevators and locked the doors while accompanying Wills to search the offices one by one. Five men were found in the DNC offices. Wills recalled in 1997, "When we turned the lights on, one person, then two persons, then three persons came out, and on down the line." Details that emerged during their questioning and trials triggered the Watergate scandal. The five men arrested were Bernard L. Barker, Virgilio Gonzalez, Eugenio Martinez, James W. McCord Jr., and Frank Sturgis.

== Aftermath ==
External videos
- The Ballad of a Watergate Security Guard, 2:32, sung by the Reverend Douglas Kirkpatrick, WNYC

One story reports that after the Watergate break-in, he received a raise of $2.50 per week (equivalent to $19 in 2025) above his previous $80 per week salary (equivalent to $620 in 2025). Another story states he wanted, but did not receive, a promotion for discovering the burglary.

According to The New York Times, Wills quit his job because he did not receive a raise. He then struggled staying employed because media opportunities and appearances kept him away from work, most of which consisted of minimum-wage jobs.

Wills played himself in the 1976 film All the President's Men. The book and film were based on Bob Woodward and Carl Bernstein's 1974 book of the same name accounting their investigation into the Watergate scandal. Wills also appeared briefly on the talk-show circuit.

The log entry that Wills made on June 17, 1972, at 1:47 a.m. is memorialized in the National Archives.

== Later life and poverty ==
Over the next 20 years, Wills struggled to establish and maintain roots and stability while suffering bouts of unemployment. He shuttled between Washington and other southern cities, with some time spent in The Bahamas. He said in an interview that Howard University feared losing their federal funding if they hired him. A security job with Georgetown University did not last long. Also, he worked in a failed stint as a diet food spokesperson for the comedian Dick Gregory.

In the mid-1970s, Wills finally settled in North Augusta, South Carolina, to care for his aging mother, who had suffered a stroke. Together, they survived on her $450 per month Social Security checks. In 1979, Wills was convicted of shoplifting and fined $20. Four years later, he was convicted of shoplifting a pair of sneakers from a store in Augusta, Georgia, and was sentenced to one year in prison. By the time of his mother's death in 1993, Wills was so destitute that he had to donate her body to medical research because he had no money with which to bury her.

Only when significant anniversaries of the Watergate break-in occurred did the waning spotlight reach out towards him again. In 1992, on the 20th anniversary of the burglary of the DNC headquarters, reporters asked if he were given the chance to do it all over again, would he? Wills replied with annoyance, "That's like asking me if I'd rather be white than black. It was just a part of destiny." That same year, Wills told a Boston Globe reporter: "I put my life on the line. I went out of my way.... If it wasn't for me, Woodward and Bernstein would not have known anything about Watergate. This wasn't finding a dollar under a couch somewhere." Wills was quoted saying: "Everybody tells me I'm some kind of hero, but I certainly don't have any hard evidence. I did what I was hired to do but still I feel a lot of folk don't want to give me credit, that is, a chance to move upward in my job".

Otherwise, Wills tended his garden, made the local library his study, and led a quiet life with his cats. Frank Wills died at the Medical College of Georgia hospital in Augusta, Georgia, at the age of 52, from a brain tumor.

== Recognition ==
Frank Wills was honored by the NAACP. The civil rights organization presented him with a truck.

Musician Harry Nilsson dedicated his 1973 album A Little Touch of Schmilsson in the Night to Wills for his role in bringing down Richard Nixon.

The Democratic National Committee gave Wills an award, and the chairman said he had played "a unique role in the history of the nation".

According to Wills' obituary in The New York Times, the "most eloquent description of his role" in American history came on July 29, 1974; Rep. James Mann (D-South Carolina), while casting his vote to impeach Nixon on the House Judiciary Committee, said:

"If there is no accountability, another president will feel free to do as he chooses. But the next time there may be no watchman in the night."

== In popular culture ==
Soon after the burglary in 1972 the folk singer Ron Turner composed "The Ballad of Frank Wills." He recorded it for Folkways Records in 1973, and the folk singer Frederick Douglass Kirkpatrick also recorded it at WNYC on January 1, 1975.

Wills portrayed himself, discovering the break-in in the opening scene of the 1976 film, All the President's Men.

An alternative version of events is depicted in the 1994 film, Forrest Gump, in which Wills (voice actor uncredited) is alerted to the burglary when answering a call from the eponymous hotel guest who was disturbed by the burglars’ flashlights.

In 2004, an imaginary scene of Wills discovering the taped door latches was enacted in the film She Hate Me, directed by Spike Lee, starring Anthony Mackie and Kerry Washington.

In 2017, Wills discovering the taped door latches was enacted as the closing scene of the film The Post, directed by Steven Spielberg, starring Meryl Streep and Tom Hanks.

In 2022, Wills was portrayed by Patrick Walker in the political thriller television limited series Gaslit on Starz, starring Julia Roberts and Sean Penn, which depicts Wills making his rounds at the hotel and discovering the door being taped open two different times.

In 2023, Wills was portrayed by Eddie K. Robinson Jr. in the third episode of the HBO miniseries White House Plumbers.

In 2026, Wesley Brown published the novel Looking for Frank Wills with the publishing house McSweeneys. The novel blends historical fact with fiction to examine the personal toll of Wills's role in American history.
