= Rachael Harris =

American actress and comedian (born 1968)

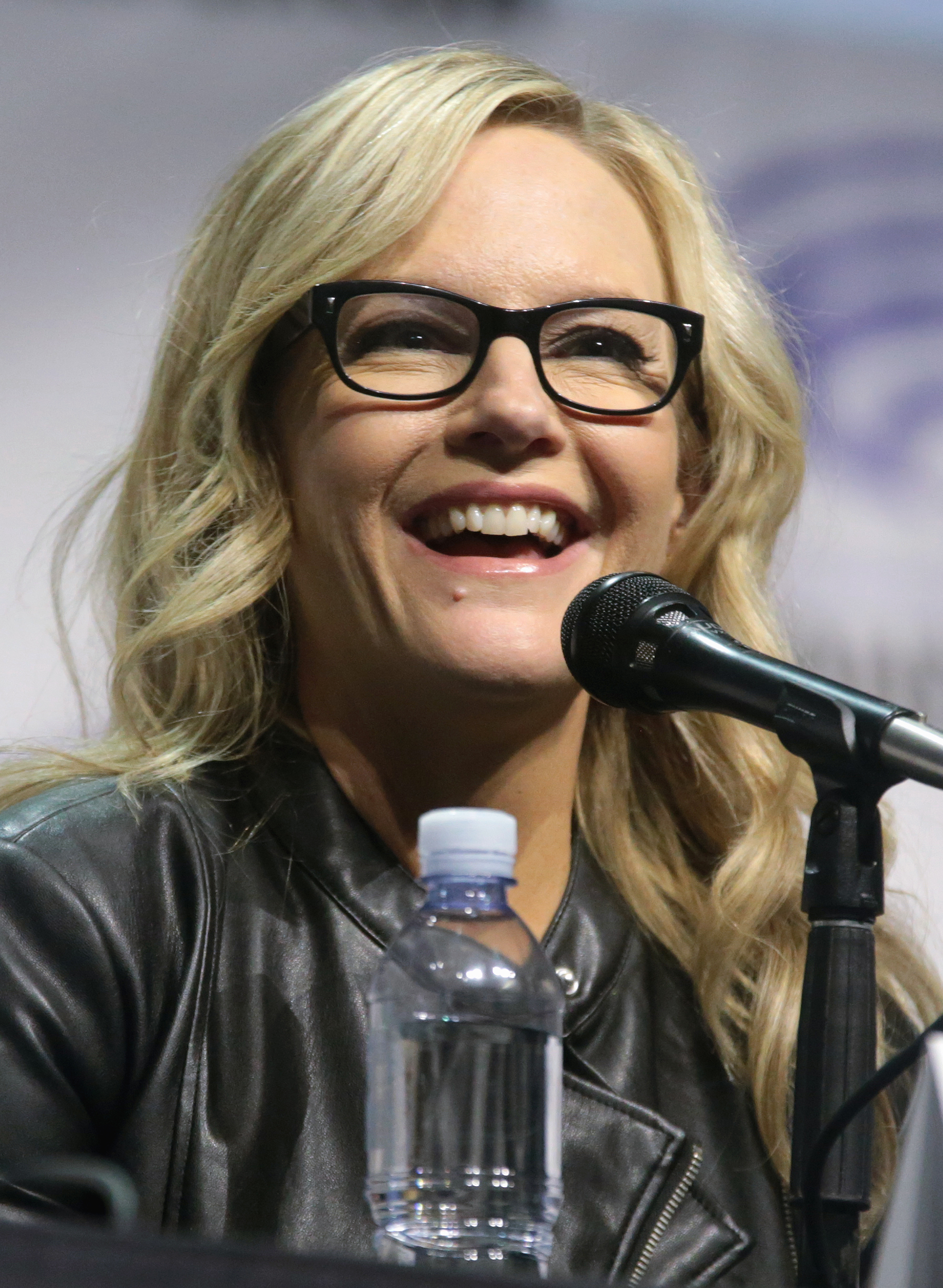
- Harris at the 2017 WonderCon
- Born: January 12, 1968 (age 58); Worthington, Ohio, U.S.
- Other name: Rachel Harris
- Education: Otterbein College
- Occupations: Actress; comedian
- Years active: 1988–present
- Spouses: Adam Paul (m. 2003; div. 2008); Christian Hebel (m. 2015; div. 2019)
- Children: 2

Rachael Harris (born January 12, 1968) is an American actress and comedian. The accolades she has received include nominations for an Independent Spirit Award and a Saturn Award.

In film, Harris has had lead roles as Susan Heffley in the Diary of a Wimpy Kid film series (2010–2012) and Linda White in Natural Selection (2011). She has also had notable supporting roles in For Your Consideration (2006), The Hangover (2009), Bad Words (2013), Night at the Museum: Secret of the Tomb (2014), Old Dads (2023), and Mother of the Bride (2024).

In television, Harris has had main cast roles as Cooper on the ABC sitcom Notes from the Underbelly (2007–2008), Joanne Dunlevy on the Fox sitcom Surviving Jack (2014), Dr. Linda Martin on the Fox and Netflix fantasy series Lucifer (2016–2021), and Nora on season 1 of the Disney+ and Hulu horror series Goosebumps (2023). She had a recurring role as Sheila Sazs on the USA Network series Suits (2012–2019).

== Early life, family and education ==
Harris was born in Worthington, Ohio. She graduated from Worthington High School in 1986. Her first award in the arts came during a first grade talent show, performing "Please Mr. Postman" by the Carpenters, winning the talent show with the performance due to her brother stuffing the ballot box.

While attending Otterbein College, Harris acted onstage in dramas such as 'night, Mother and The Cherry Orchard. A professor recommended Harris perform comedy instead of drama. Initially, she resisted; her intent was to be a stage actress. She graduated in 1989, earning a Bachelor of Fine Arts in theatre.

== Career ==
Harris' first acting job during college was in Cincinnati on the showboat Majestic, playing Maria from The Sound of Music.

After college, Harris moved to New York City and secured a commercial agent. She worked as a hostess at restaurants along Broadway and the Upper East Side. Meanwhile, she auditioned for theater roles, eventually landing a job performing children's theater.

Harris made her film debut in 1992 as the Treehouse Mom in Treehouse Trolls. She recalled the experience during the audition: "Treehouse Trolls, that just came out of an audition in this shitty theater. Like, it wasn't even a theater. It was a room. Near Times Square. And I was like, "I hope this is a legitimate audition. I could be going in for a porn. I don't know." She debuted on television on SeaQuest DSV in 1993.

Harris' agent was relocating to Los Angeles and recommended that Harris come along for commercials and TV. In LA, she performed at the Tamarind Theatre. After an appearance on Star Trek: Voyager in 1997, Harris went on to a recurring role in The WB's Sister, Sister through 1998.

A friend recommended Harris to come and watch the improvisational comedy troupe The Groundlings. She enjoyed the group so much she decided to take classes and eventually landed a gig with the main company in 2000. She went on to teach for a time with The Groundlings school also. Working with the Groundlings helped for mockumentary screenwriter and director Christopher Guest to notice Harris. In 2000, she had a role in Guest's feature film Best in Show.

In 2002, Harris performed on the sitcom on Friends, appeared in I Love the '80s, and landed TV commercial work which included ads for Avis and GEICO. Amongst the early commercial work, this was credited as helping Harris land a career in Hollywood. She had a stint as a correspondent for The Daily Show's 2002–2003 season which was considered a breakout role for her into comedy. In 2003 she had roles in A Mighty Wind, Daddy Day Care, and started appearances on Reno 911! from 2003 to 2022. In 2004 Harris hosted The Smoking Gun, made multiple appearances on such VH1 documentaries as I Love the '90s, Best Week Ever, The West Wing, Curb Your Enthusiasm, and an Expedia commercial.

Harris played the supporting role of Kevyn Shecket, Kirstie Alley's personal makeup artist, on the Showtime series Fat Actress in 2005. She was also in Monk, Kicking & Screaming, and commercials for Quaker Oats and T-Mobile.

Harris worked again with Christopher Guest in 2006 in his feature film For Your Consideration. She became the voice of turtle Karolyn Slowsky in the Comcast Slowskys television commercials until 2009, with reboots of the commercial series in 2011 and 2019.

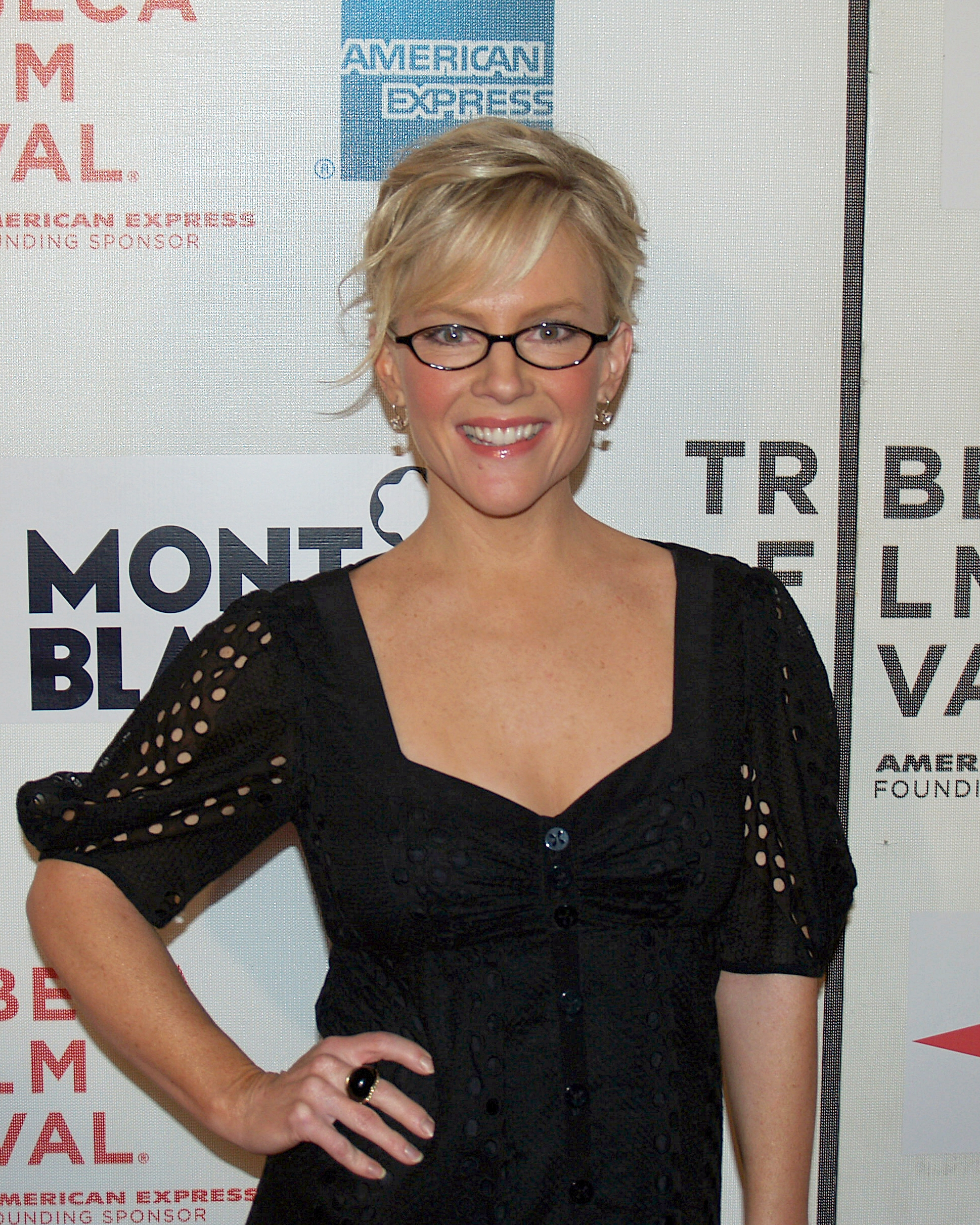
Harris at the 2007 Tribeca Film Festival

Harris had guest roles on The Sarah Silverman Program in 2007 and 2008 and played Cooper in the ABC sitcom Notes from the Underbelly from 2007–2010. In 2008, she acted in CSI: Crime Scene Investigation and Desperate Housewives.

In 2009 Harris had a role in the comedy The Hangover, playing Melissa, the domineering, abusive girlfriend to Ed Helms's character Stu. She also made an appearance on ABC's Cougar Town, playing Shanna, a woman who was the "nemesis" of Jules.

In 2010 she was in The Good Guys, a Super Bowl commercial for the 2010 Census, and Off-Broadway, she performed in Love, Loss, and What I Wore. From 2010–2012, she played Susan Heffley in the original Diary of a Wimpy Kid film trilogy. On ABC, she made a guest appearance in the Modern Family 2011 episode "Caught in the Act" as Amelia, a restaurateur and mother to a playmate of Lily Pritchett. She appeared in Suits from 2012–2019 as Sheila Sazs, Louis Litt's on-and-off again love interest. She was in an episode of The Office in 2013.

In March 2014, Harris began a new role in the series Surviving Jack with Chris Meloni. In March 2015, Harris was cast as Linda, Lucifer's therapist in the Netflix original series Lucifer.

In 2018, Harris appeared alongside Cheryl Hines on the reality TV series Hell's Kitchen. They both sat at the blue team's chef's table in the episode "Hell Freezes Over".

== Personal life ==
Harris was married to actor Adam Paul from 2003 to 2008.

Harris and violinist Christian Hebel married on April 30, 2015. They have two sons, born in 2016 and 2018. Harris filed for divorce from Hebel in 2019.

== Filmography ==
=== Film ===
Film
| Year | Title | Role | Notes |
|---|---|---|---|
| 1992 | Treehouse Trolls | Treehouse Mom | First acting role, VHS Video |
| 1996 | The Disappearance of Kevin Johnson | Fornaio Waitress #2 | |
| 2000 | Best in Show | Winky's Party Guest | |
| 2002 | Showtime | Teacher | |
| 2002 | Stuart Little 2 | Additional voices | |
| 2003 | A Mighty Wind | Steinbloom's Assistant | |
| 2003 | Daddy Day Care | Co-Worker Elaine | |
| 2003 | The Haunted Mansion | Mrs. Coleman | |
| 2004 | Starsky & Hutch | Mrs. Feldman's Friend | |
| 2004 | After the Sunset | June | |
| 2005 | Kicking & Screaming | Ann Hogan | |
| 2006 | For Your Consideration | Debbie Gilchrist | |
| 2007 | Matters of Life and Dating | Carla | |
| 2007 | License to Wed | Janine | |
| 2007 | Evan Almighty | Ark Reporter | |
| 2009 | The Hangover | Melissa | |
| 2009 | The Soloist | Leslie Bloom | |
| 2010 | Diary of a Wimpy Kid | Susan Heffley | |
| 2011 | Diary of a Wimpy Kid: Rodrick Rules | Susan Heffley | |
| 2011 | Natural Selection | Linda | |
| 2012 | Diary of a Wimpy Kid: Dog Days | Susan Heffley | |
| 2012 | Wreck-It Ralph | Deanna | Voice |
| 2013 | Bad Words | Eric Tai's Mother | |
| 2014 | Lovesick | Roberta | |
| 2014 | Night at the Museum: Secret of the Tomb | Madeline Phelps | |
| 2015 | Barely Lethal | Mrs. Larson | |
| 2015 | Freaks of Nature | Mrs. Mosely | |
| 2016 | Brother Nature | Aunt Pam | |
| 2019 | International Falls | Dee | |
| 2023 | Old Dads | Dr. Lois Shmieckel-Turner | |
| 2024 | Unfrosted | Anna Cabana | |
| 2024 | Mother of the Bride | Janice | |

=== Television ===
Television
| Year | Title | Role | Notes |
|---|---|---|---|
| 1993 | SeaQuest DSV | Rose | 1 episode |
| 1997 | Star Trek: Voyager | Martis | Episode: "Before and After" |
| 1998 | Sister, Sister | Simone | 5 episodes |
| 1999 | Serial Experiments Lain | Female Knight | Voice: English version |
| 2000 | The Amanda Show | | 1 episode |
| 2000 | Two Guys and a Girl | Pregnant Damsel | 1 episode |
| 2001 | Grosse Pointe | Reporter | 1 episode |
| 2001 | Three Sisters | Sal | 1 episode |
| 2002–2003 | The Daily Show | Correspondent | |
| 2002 | Judging Amy | Alumni Volunteer #2 | 1 episode |
| 2002 | Friends | Julie | Episode: "The One Where Rachel Has a Baby (Part 1)" |
| 2003 | Frasier | Erin | Episode: "Guns N' Neuroses" |
| 2003 | Stuart Little | Margalo | Episode: "A Model Driver" |
| 2003–2009 | Reno 911! | Debbie Dangle-Frost, Claire the Madam | 6 episodes |
| 2004 | Curb Your Enthusiasm | Joanne | 2 episodes |
| 2004 | According to Jim | Mindy | 1 episode |
| 2004 | The West Wing | Corrine McKenna | Episode: "The Hubbert Peak" |
| 2005 | Fat Actress | Kevyn Shecket | 7 episodes |
| 2005 | Monk | Alice Westergren | Episode: "Mr. Monk and the Secret Santa" |
| 2005 | Committed | Ruby | 1 episode |
| 2005 | 8 Simple Rules | Margaret Brandenbauerbern | 1 episode |
| 2007 | The New Adventures Of Old Christine | Claire | 1 episode |
| 2007 | Notes from the Underbelly | Cooper | Main cast |
| 2007 | Matters of Life and Dating | Carla | TV movie |
| 2007–2008 | The Sarah Silverman Program | School Teacher | 2 episodes |
| 2008 | Desperate Housewives | Sandra Birch | Episode: "City on Fire" |
| 2008 | CSI: Crime Scene Investigation | Megan | 1 episode - Two and a Half Deaths |
| 2008 | Pushing Daisies | Georgeann Heaps | 1 episode |
| 2008 | Suburban Shootout | Natalie Davenport | Pilot |
| 2008 | Hollywood Residential | Rachael | Voice, 3 episodes |
| 2008 | Frisky Dingo | A.L.E.X. | 2 episodes |
| 2008 | Emily's Reasons Why Not | Lila Cox-Weiner | 1 episode |
| 2008–2009 | Worst Week | Julie | 2 episodes |
| 2008–2010 | The Life & Times of Tim | Adam's Date | Voice, 3 episodes |
| 2009 | Cougar Town | Shanna | 1 episode |
| 2009 | True Jackson, VP | Kitty Monreaux | 1 episode |
| 2009 | In the Motherhood | Blair | 5 episodes |
| 2010 | My Boys | Marcia | 3 episodes |
| 2010 | Glenn Martin, DDS | Melissa the Wedding Planner | Voice, 1 episode |
| 2010 | Childrens Hospital | Mrs. Throman | 1 episode |
| 2010 | The Good Guys | Cynthia Savage | 1 episode |
| 2010 | Party Down | Marguerite Tayler | 1 episode |
| 2010 | Gary Unmarried | Rachael | 1 episode |
| 2011 | Modern Family | Amelia | Episode: "Caught in the Act" |
| 2011 | Archer | Rona Thorne | 1 episode |
| 2011 | $#*! My Dad Says | Soledad Cho | 1 episode |
| 2012 | New Girl | Tanya Lamontagne | 4 episodes |
| 2012 | Happy Endings | Suzanne | Episode "Sabado Free-Gante" |
| 2013 | Newsreaders | Wendy Hayflack | 1 episode |
| 2013 | The Office | Rachael | 1 episode |
| 2012–2019 | Suits | Sheila Sazs | 27 episodes (Guest: seasons 2–5; Recurring: seasons 7–9) |
| 2014 | Surviving Jack | Joanne Dunlevy | Series regular |
| 2014 | Maron | Herself | 1 episode |
| 2014 | Bad Judge | Dana McCoy | 1 episode |
| 2015 | Gortimer Gibbon's Life on Normal Street | Mayor | 1 episode |
| 2015 | BoJack Horseman | Cardigan Burke (voice) | 1 episode |
| 2015 | RuPaul's Drag Race | Herself/Judge | 1 episode |
| 2016–2021 | Lucifer | Dr. Linda Martin | Main cast |
| 2016-2020 | Mike Tyson Mysteries | Various voices | 3 episodes |
| 2018 | Hell's Kitchen | Herself | Co-VIP guest diner for the blue team; Episode: "Hell Freezes Over" |
| 2020 | Make It Work! | Herself | Television special |
| 2022 | Ghosts | Sheryl | 1 episode |
| 2023 | Fantasy Island | Tara Bendetti | 1 episode |
| 2023 | Goosebumps | Nora | Main role (Season 1) |
| 2025 | Leverage: Redemption | Judge Marlene Gannon | 1 episode |
| 2026 | Star Trek: Strange New Worlds | Captain Ch'Rol | 1 episode |

=== Awards and nominations ===
| Year | Award | Category | Nominated work | Result |
|---|---|---|---|---|
| 2012 | Independent Spirit Awards | Best Female Lead | Natural Selection | Nominated |
| 2022 | Saturn Awards | Best Guest Starring Role on Television | Ghosts | Nominated |
