= John N. Mitchell =

American lawyer and criminal (1913–1988)

John Mitchell
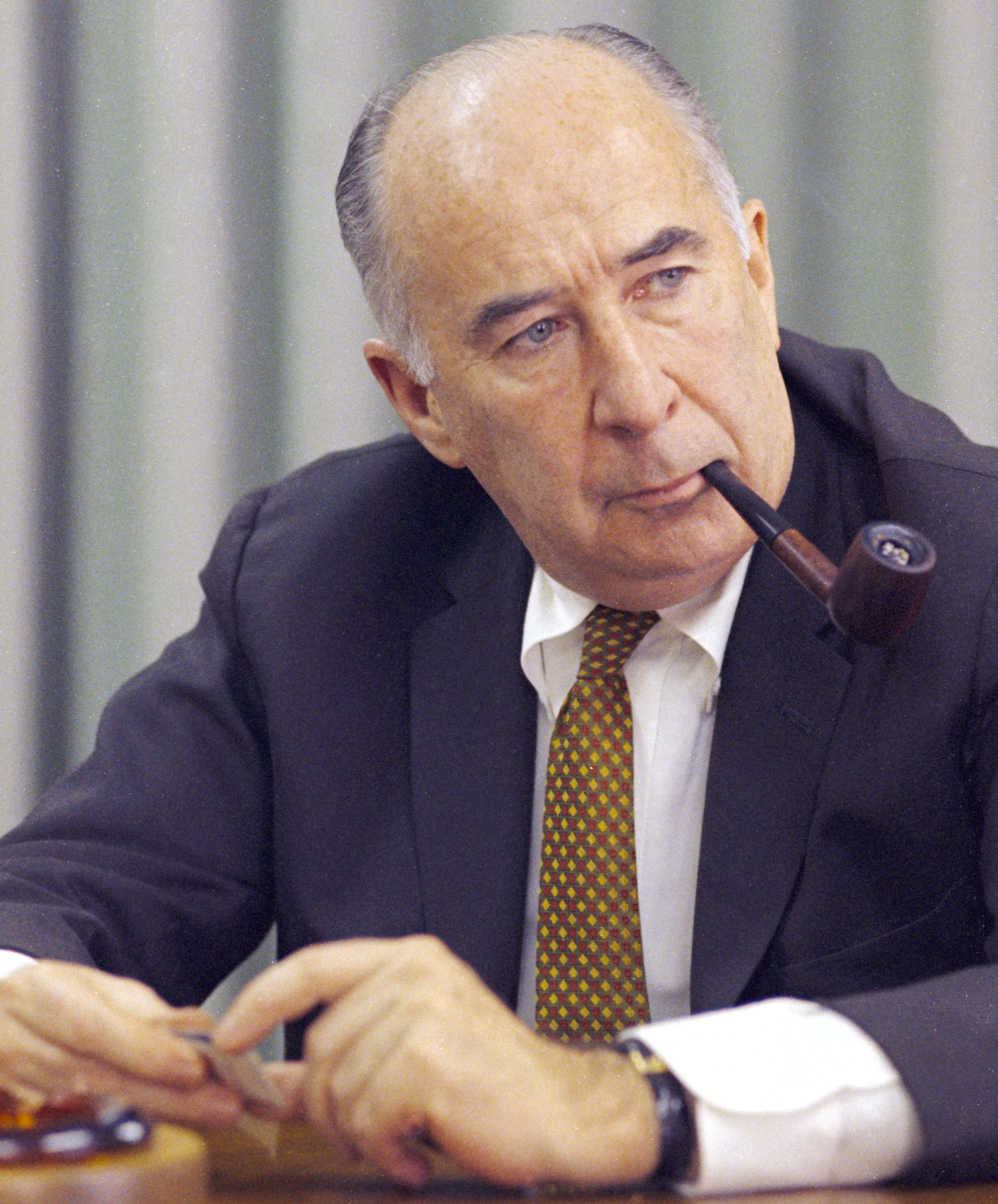
- Mitchell in 1971

67th United States Attorney General
- In office January 20, 1969 – March 1, 1972
- President: Richard Nixon
- Deputy: Richard Kleindienst
- Preceded by: Ramsey Clark
- Succeeded by: Richard Kleindienst

Personal details
- Born: John Newton Mitchell; September 15, 1913 Detroit, Michigan, U.S.
- Died: November 9, 1988 (aged 75) Washington, D.C., U.S.
- Party: Republican
- Spouse: Martha Beall (m. 1957; sep. 1973)
- Children: 1 (daughter)
- Education: Fordham University (LLB)
- Known for: Convicted of crimes committed during his tenure as U.S. Attorney General

Military service
- Branch/service: United States Navy
- Years of service: 1943–1946
- Rank: Lieutenant (junior grade)
- Battles/wars: World War II: Pacific War

John Newton Mitchell (September 15, 1913 – November 9, 1988) was the 67th attorney general of the United States under President Richard Nixon. He also was chairman of Nixon's 1968 and 1972 presidential campaigns. Prior to that, he had been a municipal bond lawyer and one of Nixon's associates. Mitchell was tried and convicted as a result of his involvement in the Watergate scandal.

After his tenure as U.S. Attorney General, he served as chairman of Nixon's 1972 presidential campaign. Due to multiple crimes he committed in the Watergate affair, Mitchell was sentenced to prison in 1977 and served 19 months. Despite this, he was noted for personifying the "law-and-order" positions of the Nixon administration as attorney general, amid several high-profile anti-Vietnam War demonstrations.

== Early life ==
Mitchell was born in Detroit to Margaret (McMahon) and Joseph C. Mitchell. He grew up in the New York City borough of Queens. He attended Fordham University from 1932 to 1934, and earned his law degree from Fordham University School of Law in 1938. Mitchell carried out postgraduate study at St. John's University Law School in 1938 and 1939.

During World War II, Mitchell served for three years in the United States Navy and attained the rank of lieutenant (junior grade) as a PT boat commander. Stories Mitchell told about his naval service were later debunked, including having received the Silver Star and Purple Heart, served as John F. Kennedy's commanding officer, and saved the life of Pappy Boyington. Except for his period of military service, Mitchell practiced law in New York City from 1938 until 1969 with the firm of Rose, Guthrie, Alexander and Mitchell and earned a reputation as a successful municipal bond lawyer. Richard Nixon was a partner in the firm from 1963 to 1968.

Mitchell's second wife, Martha Mitchell, became a controversial figure, gaining notoriety for her late-night phone calls to reporters in which she accused Nixon of participating in the Watergate cover-up and alleged that he and several of his aides were trying to make her husband the scapegoat for the whole affair.

== New York government ==
Mitchell devised a type of revenue bond called a "moral obligation bond" while serving as bond counsel to New York Governor Nelson Rockefeller in the 1960s. In an effort to get around the voter approval process for increasing state and municipal borrower limits, Mitchell attached language to the offerings that was able to communicate the state's intent to meet the bond payments while not placing it under a legal obligation to do so. Mitchell did not dispute when asked in an interview if the intent of such language was to create a "form of political elitism that bypasses the voter's right to a referendum or an initiative."

== Political career ==
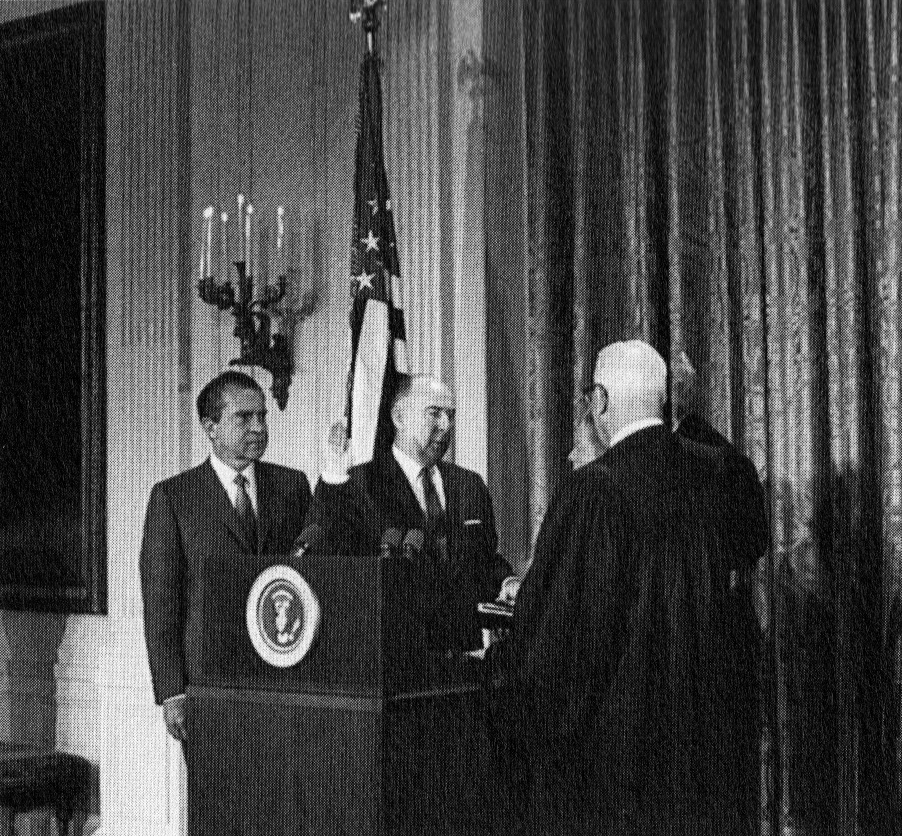
Mitchell is sworn in as Attorney General of the United States, January 22, 1969. Chief Justice Earl Warren administers the oath while President Richard Nixon looks on.

In 1967, the firm of Caldwell, Trimble & Mitchell, where Mitchell was lead partner, merged with Richard Nixon's firm, Nixon, Mudge, Rose, Guthrie, & Alexander. Nixon was then officially in "political retirement" but was quietly organizing a return to politics in the 1968 Presidential Election. Mitchell, with his many contacts in local government, became an important strategic confidant to Nixon, who referred to him as "the heavyweight."

=== Nixon campaign manager ===
In 1968 John Mitchell agreed to become Nixon's presidential campaign manager. During his successful 1968 campaign, Nixon turned over the details of the day-to-day operations to Mitchell.

=== Vietnam ===
Allegedly, Mitchell also played a central role in covert attempts to sabotage the 1968 Paris Peace Accords which could have ended the Vietnam War (the "Chennault Affair").

=== Attorney general ===
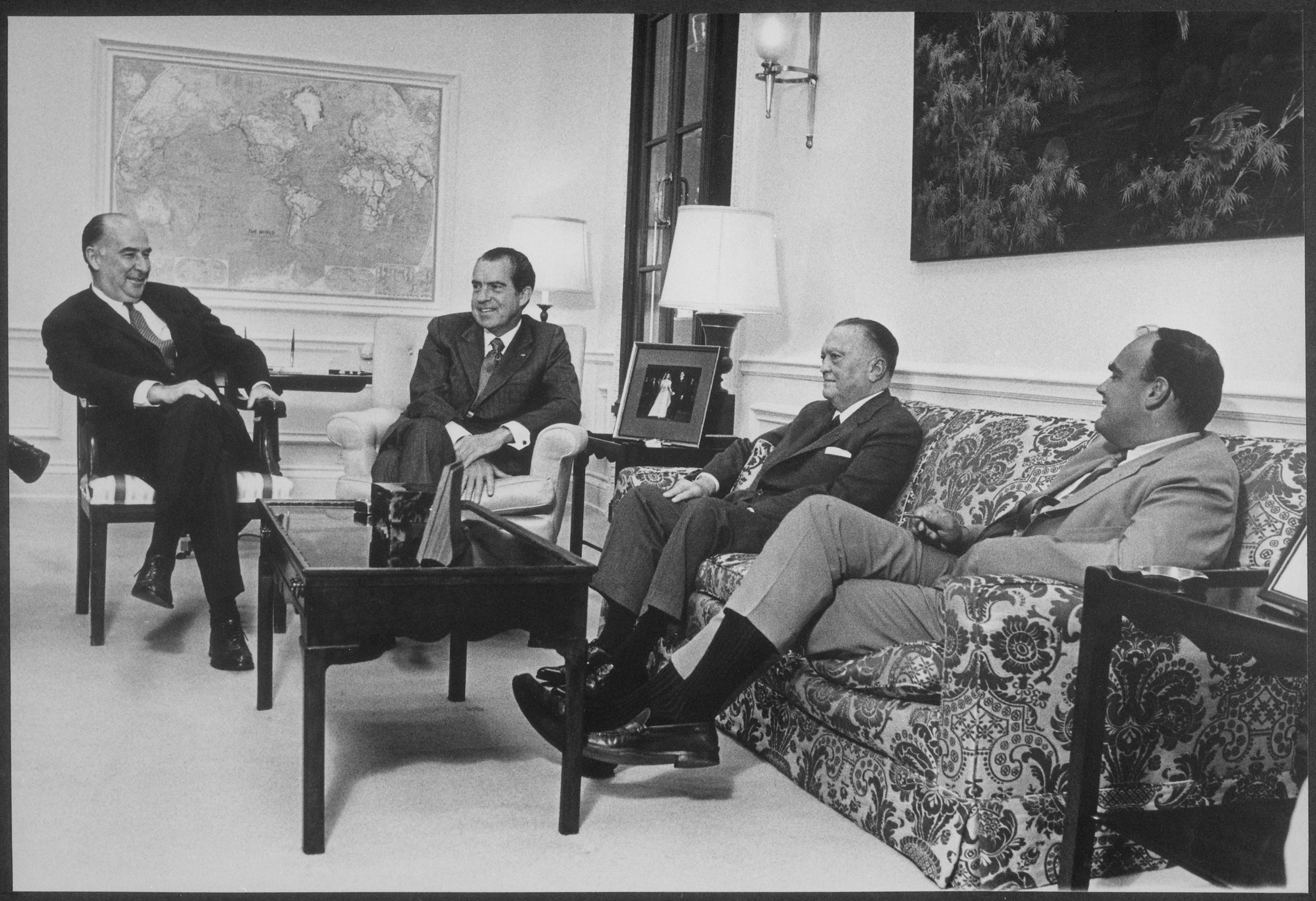
Mitchell, Richard Nixon, J. Edgar Hoover and John Ehrlichman in May 1971

After Nixon became president in January 1969, he appointed Mitchell as Attorney General of the United States while making an unprecedented direct appeal to FBI Director J. Edgar Hoover that the usual background investigation not be conducted. Mitchell remained in office from 1969 until he resigned in 1972 to manage Nixon's reelection campaign.

=== Law and order ===
Mitchell believed that the government's need for "law and order" justified restrictions on civil liberties. He advocated the use of wiretaps in national security cases without obtaining a court order (United States v. U.S. District Court, Nixon wiretaps) and the right of police to employ the preventive detention of criminal suspects. He brought conspiracy charges against critics of the Vietnam War, likening them to brown shirts of the Nazi era in Germany.

Mitchell expressed a reluctance to involve the Justice Department in some civil rights issues. "The Department of Justice is a law enforcement agency", he told reporters. "It is not the place to carry on a program aimed at curing the ills of society." However, he also told activists, "You will be better advised to watch what we do, not what we say."

=== School desegregation ===
Near the beginning of the Nixon administration, Mitchell acted slowly on the desegregation of schools in the South, in fulfillment of Nixon's "Southern Strategy", his 1968 electoral approach to garner support from Southern white voters. After being instructed by the federal courts that schools necessitated immediate desegregation and that the executive branch was required to enforce the rulings of the courts, Mitchell began to comply, threatening to withhold federal funds from those school systems that were still segregated and threatening legal action against them.

School segregation had been struck down as unconstitutional by a unanimous Supreme Court decision in 1954 (Brown v. Board of Education), but in 1955, the Court ruled that desegregation needed to be accomplished only with "all deliberate speed," which many Southern states interpreted as an invitation to delay. It was not until 1969 that the Supreme Court renounced the "all deliberate speed" rule and declared that further delay in accomplishing desegregation was no longer permissible. As a result, some 70% of black children were still attending segregated schools in 1968 when Nixon became president. By 1972, as a result of President Nixon's policy this percentage had decreased to 8%, a greater decrease than in any of the previous three presidents. Enrollment of black children in desegregated schools rose from 186,000 in 1969 to 3 million in 1970.

=== Public safety ===
From the outset, Mitchell strove to suppress what many Americans saw as major threats to their safety: urban crime, black unrest, and war resistance. He called for the use of "no-knock" warrants for police to enter homes, frisking suspects without a warrant, wiretapping, preventive detention, the use of federal troops to repress crime in the capital, a restructured Supreme Court, and a slowdown in school desegregation. "This country is going so far to the right you won't recognize it", he told a reporter.

There had been national outrage over the 1969 burning Cuyahoga River. President Nixon had signed the National Environmental Policy Act on New Year's Day in 1970, establishing the United States Environmental Protection Agency (EPA). Nixon appointed William Ruckelshaus to head the agency, which opened its doors December 2, 1970. Mitchell gave a Press Conference December 18, 1970: "I would like to call attention to an area of activity that we have not publicly emphasized lately, but which I feel, because of the changing events, deserves your attention. I refer to the pollution control litigation, with particular reference to our work with the new Environmental Protection Agency, now headed by William Ruckelshaus. As in the case of other government departments and agencies, EPA refers civil and criminal suits to the Department of Justice, which determines whether there is a base for prosecution and of course, if we find it so, we proceed with court action.... And today, I would like to announce that we are filing suit this morning against the Jones and Laughlin Steel Corporation for discharging substantial quantities of cyanide into the Cuyahoga River near Cleveland. Mr. Ruckelshaus has said, when he asked the Department to file this suit, that the 180-day notice filed against the company had expired. We are filing a civil suit to seek immediate injunctive relief under the Refuse Act of 1899 and the Federal Water Pollution Act to halt the discharge of these deleterious materials into the river."

=== Dirty tricks ===
In an early sample of the "dirty tricks" that would later mark the 1971–72 campaign, Mitchell approved a $10,000 subsidy to employ an American Nazi Party faction in a bizarre effort to get Alabama Governor George Wallace off the ballots in California. The scheme failed.

== Vesco donation obstruction trial ==
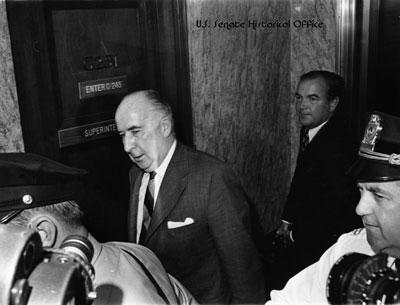
Former attorney general Mitchell enters the Senate caucus room to testify before the Senate Watergate Committee, 1973

John Mitchell's name was mentioned in a deposition concerning Robert L. Vesco, an international financier who was a fugitive from a federal indictment. Mitchell and Nixon Finance Committee Chairman Maurice H. Stans were indicted in May 1973 on federal charges of obstructing an investigation of Vesco after he made a $200,000 contribution to the Nixon campaign. In April 1974, both men were acquitted in a New York federal district court.

== Watergate scandal ==
In the days immediately after the Watergate break-in of June 17, 1972, Mitchell enlisted former FBI agent Steve King to prevent his wife Martha from learning about the break-in or contacting reporters. While she was on a phone call with journalist Helen Thomas about the break-in, King pulled the phone cord from the wall. Mrs. Mitchell was held against her will in a California hotel room and forcibly sedated by a psychiatrist after a physical struggle with five men that left her needing stitches. Nixon aides, in an effort to discredit her, told the press that she had a "drinking problem". Nixon was later to tell interviewer David Frost in 1977 that Martha was a distraction to John Mitchell, such that no one was minding the store, and "If it hadn't been for Martha Mitchell, there'd have been no Watergate."

In 1972, when asked to comment about a forthcoming article that reported that he controlled a political slush fund used for gathering intelligence on the Democrats, he famously uttered an implied threat to reporter Carl Bernstein: "Katie Graham's gonna get her tit caught in a big fat wringer if that's published."

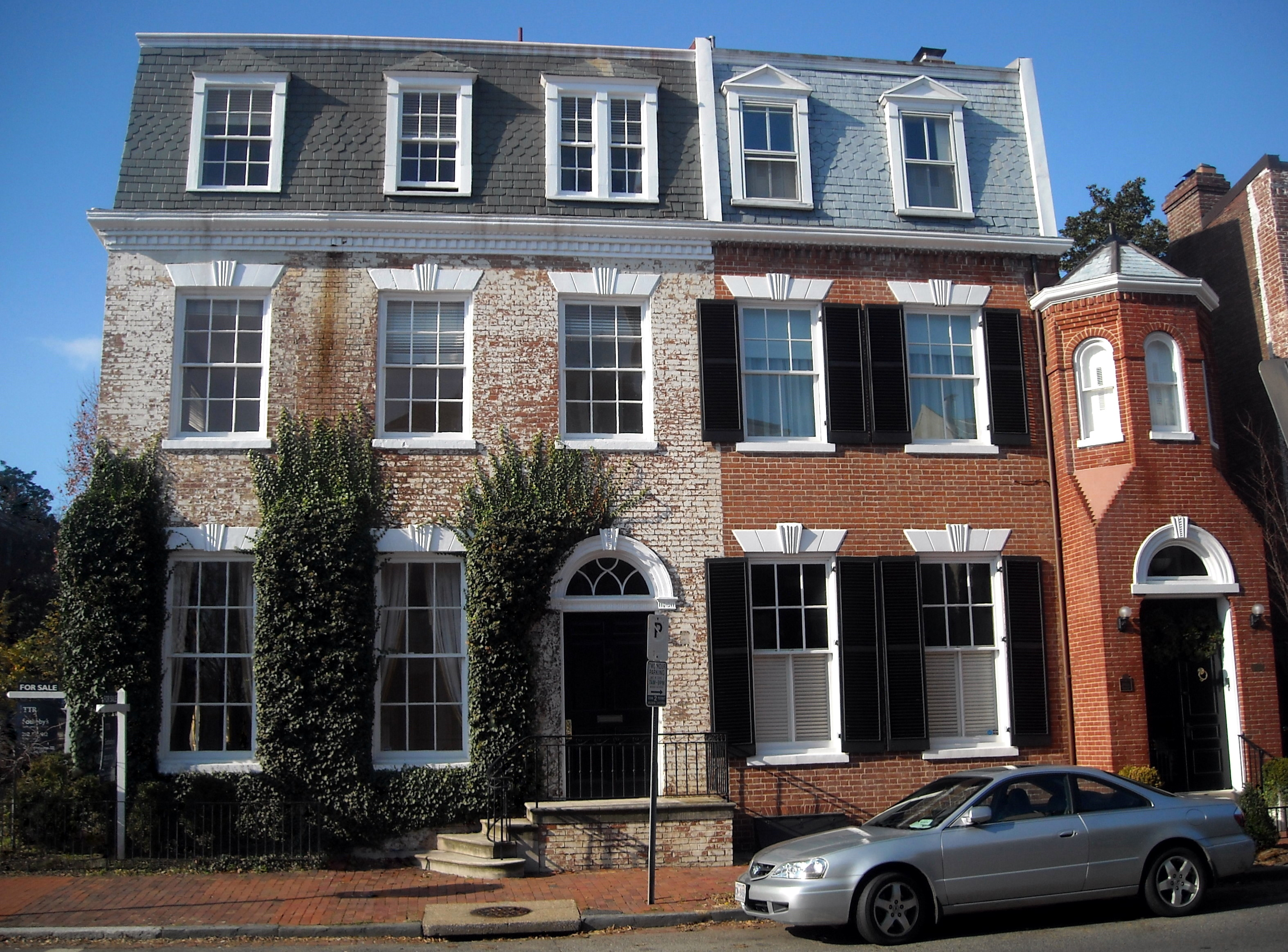
One of Mitchell's former residences (left) in Georgetown, Washington, D.C.

In July 1973, Mitchell testified before the Senate Watergate Committee where he claimed he had no prior knowledge of the Watergate break-in, which contradicted the testimony of others who appeared before the committee. He admitted that he was briefed on January 27, 1972, while he was the attorney general, by G. Gordon Liddy on Operation Gemstone which proposed numerous illegal activities to support the reelection of President Nixon, including the use of prostitutes, kidnapping, and assaulting antiwar protestors. Mitchell testified he should have thrown Liddy "out of the window". Jeb Stuart Magruder and John Dean testified to the committee that Mitchell later approved electronic surveillance (i.e., bugging telephones) but did not approve of the other proposed activities.

Tape recordings made by President Nixon and the testimony of others involved confirmed that Mitchell had participated in meetings to plan the break-in of the Democratic Party's national headquarters in the Watergate Office Building. In addition, he had met with the president on at least three occasions to cover up White House involvement, using illegal means such as witness tampering, after the burglars were discovered and arrested.

On January 1, 1975, Mitchell, who was represented by the criminal defense attorney William G. Hundley, was found guilty of conspiracy, obstruction of justice, and perjury. Mitchell was sentenced on February 21 to two-and-a-half to eight years in prison for his role in the Watergate break-in and cover-up, which he dubbed the "White House horrors". As a result of the conviction, Mitchell was disbarred from the practice of law in New York. The sentence was later reduced to one-to-four years by United States District Court Judge John J. Sirica. Mitchell served 19 months of his sentence at Federal Prison Camp, Montgomery (in Maxwell Air Force Base) in Montgomery, Alabama, a minimum-security prison, before being released on parole for medical reasons.

== Death ==
Around 5:00 pm on November 9, 1988, Mitchell collapsed from a heart attack on the sidewalk in front of 2812 N Street NW in the Georgetown area of Washington, D.C., and died that evening at George Washington University Hospital. He was buried with full military honors at Arlington National Cemetery. He was eligible for the honor because of his World War II Naval service and having held the cabinet post of Attorney General.

== In popular culture ==
- John Randolph had an uncredited role in the 1976 film All the President's Men as the voice of John Mitchell.
- Randolph portrayed Mitchell again, this time in a credited role, in Blind Ambition
- Mitchell's archival footages are shown in Slow Burn.
- He was portrayed by E. G. Marshall in Oliver Stone's 1995 film Nixon.
- He was portrayed by John Doman in the 2020 film The Trial of the Chicago 7.
- Mitchell is portrayed by Sean Penn in the 2022 limited series Gaslit.
- He was portrayed by John Carroll Lynch in the 2023 miniseries White House Plumbers.

Legal offices
Preceded by Ramsey Clark	United States Attorney General; 1969–1972	Succeeded by Richard Kleindienst
