= Leon Neyfakh =

American journalist

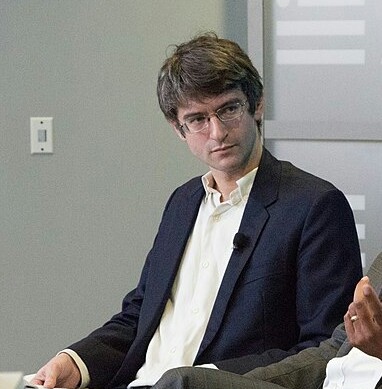
- Born: 1985 (age 40–41); Soviet Union
- Citizenship: American
- Education: Harvard University (BA)
- Occupations: Journalist, staff writer, radio host

Leon Neyfakh (born 1985) is an American journalist, radio host and writer. He is known for hosting the podcasts Slow Burn and Fiasco, and his book The Next Next Level: A Story of Rap, Friendship, and Almost Giving Up.

== Early life and education ==
Neyfakh was born in the Soviet Union and raised in Oak Park, Illinois. Both of his parents are Russian Jews who immigrated to the United States when Neyfakh was a child.

He graduated from Harvard University in 2007 with an A.B. in history and literature. During his time there, he wrote for its student newspaper, The Harvard Crimson.

== Career ==
Neyfakh is best known for creating and hosting Slate's podcast Slow Burn, which has covered American political scandals. The first season of the podcast was about the Watergate scandal of Richard Nixon, and the second season covered the Lewinsky scandal of Bill Clinton.

Before joining Slate, Neyfakh worked for the Boston Globe as the Ideas staff, and was a reporter for the New York Observer. He has also written for The FADER, The New Republic, and Rollingstone.com.

Neyfakh also wrote a book titled The Next Next Level: A Story of Rap, Friendship, and Almost Giving Up, about Juiceboxxx, a rapper from Wisconsin.

In November 2018, Neyfakh announced on Twitter that he was leaving Slate to write and host his new podcast, Fiasco, which is offered exclusively on the Luminary podcast platform. The first season, Fiasco: Bush v. Gore focused on the Bush vs. Gore legal battle, and the second, Fiasco: Iran-Contra, is centered around the Iran–Contra affair. This season was later adapted to a six-part television series by Epix in 2021.

In February 2019, it was announced that Epix would release a six-part docu-series inspired by Slow Burn with Neyfakh as host. The series premiered on February 16, 2020.

The third season of Fiasco, Fiasco: The Battle For Boston, is centered on the Boston busing crisis of the 1970s, and was released in August 2020, during the ongoing George Floyd protests. When asked about how Americans can actively and effectively engage in the topic of race, Neyfakh said:

I think there should be more recognition on the part of white people like me that believing in equality usually means giving something up. In the new season of Fiasco, listeners will hear a lot of white voices saying they believe in integration and equality but not in “busing” because it’s not fair to force white children into worse schools. The thing is, as [the journalist] Nikole Hannah-Jones has written, busing is the most immediate method of desegregating schools and making them equal. Of course someone has to give something up."

In early 2020, a new podcast called 5-4 was launched, for which Neyfakh provides introductions to the individual episodes and has editorial oversight. The podcast focuses on U.S. Supreme Court cases and how they impact life and liberty of Americans.

The fourth season of Fiasco, titled Fiasco: Benghazi, was released in 2021. The season is centered around the 2012 Benghazi attack and the political scandal that followed.

The fifth season of Fiasco was released in 2022. Titled Fiasco: The AIDS Crisis, it tackles the history of the AIDS epidemic in the United States.

In 2023, Neyfakh and radio deejay and cultural commentator Jay Smooth released the "Think Twice" podcast covering the legacy of singer and performer Michael Jackson.

== Personal life ==
Neyfakh is married to Alice Gregory, a freelance journalist. The couple live in Brooklyn, New York City, and have a black toy poodle named Mickey.
