= List of media spin-offs =

In media, a spin-off (or spinoff) is a radio program, television program, video game, film, or any narrative work, derived from already existing works that focus on more details and different aspects from the original work (e.g. particular topics, characters or events).

== In television ==
=== Name changes or retoolings ===
- The main character from All in the Family, Archie Bunker, continued in a retooled version of the series called Archie Bunker's Place, which then spun off Gloria, the story of the Bunker's now-divorced daughter.
- After The Golden Girls ended its run, due to star Bea Arthur's decision to leave the show, the other three stars—Rue McClanahan, Betty White and Estelle Getty—reprised their characters in a follow-up series entitled The Golden Palace. It lasted 24 episodes.
- After the seventh year of Da Vinci's Inquest, most of the main characters returned the next season for Da Vinci's City Hall. The new series carries over some of the same plot threads, the difference being a slight shift in themes that began in the last season of the original series. City Hall is sometimes even referred to as the eighth season of Inquest.
- Before the 11th season of M*A*S*H the seven principal cast members voted whether that season would be the series' last. Following the series' conclusion, the three actors to vote for continuation, William Christopher, Jamie Farr, and Harry Morgan, appeared in the post-war series AfterMASH, which lasted less than two complete seasons.
- The popular cartoon Batman: The Animated Series was brought back after cancellation with a new name and a new smoother animation style. The New Batman Adventures only lasted 24 episodes. It is later replaced by another spin-off Batman Beyond, lasted 52 episodes which also spawned another spin-off named The Zeta Project. Batman: TAS also spawned other animated series set in the same universe: Superman: The Animated Series, Static Shock, Justice League and Justice League Unlimited.
- The characters played by Lynda Bellingham and Julia Sawalha in the UK TV series Second Thoughts later reappeared in the series Faith in the Future.
- Six years after the British sitcom Are You Being Served? ended, a new series started up featuring five of the six cast members from the final season of the original show. The new show was entitled Grace & Favour (aired in the United States as Are You Being Served? Again!) and featured the characters from the original show transplanted into a new setting.
- After three series of the prison-based sit-com Porridge, the main character of Norman Stanley Fletcher was released from prison and the show was retooled as Going Straight. It sees Fletcher trying to re-emerge as a valued member of society, having vowed to stay away from crime on his release.
- At the end of its seventh season, Three's Company became Three's a Crowd following the marriage of Janet (Joyce DeWitt) and the departure of Terri (Priscilla Barnes). Jack (John Ritter) moves in with his girlfriend Vicky (Mary Cadorette) in an apartment above his restaurant, located in a building subsequently bought by her disapproving father (Robert Mandan). This development ended the gay ruse, with Mr. Furley (Don Knotts) taking credit for Jack's "conversion".
- The cult Nickelodeon hit cartoon franchise The Ren & Stimpy Show was retooled as Ren & Stimpy "Adult Party Cartoon" which aired on Spike TV and lasted only six episodes.
- After The Suite Life of Zack & Cody ended, the series was retooled as The Suite Life on Deck. It involves Zack Martin, Cody Martin, London Tipton and Mr. Moseby staying on a cruise ship.
- Having succeeded with Isa TKM, the original telenovela-like teen program from Nickelodeon Latin America, it has a spin-off named Isa TK+, with some of the same and new main characters, and new minor characters.
- After Mighty Morphin Power Rangers ended with the miniseries, the show was retooled as Power Rangers Zeo, which involved five of the six Rangers Tommy Oliver, Rocky DeSantos, Adam Park, Billy Cranston and Katherine Hillard entering into the rebuilt Command Center, with the four Rangers alongside new Ranger Tanya Sloan becoming the Zeo Rangers and Billy retiring as a Ranger by becoming the technical advisor to the team.
- Girl Meets World is a spin-off of Boy Meets World where the show revolves around Cory and Topanga's daughter Riley and her best friend Maya. The series ran for three seasons.
- Salty's Lighthouse is an American spin-off of the British children's TV series Tugs as it uses recycled footage and characters from Tugs.
- Endeavour is a prequel of the British detective series Inspector Morse, with the main character Morse in his younger years. Another spin-off is Lewis (see below).
- Putta Gowri Maduve was renamed to Mangala Gowri Maduve after the exit of original leads Ranjani Raghavan and Rakshith Gowda and started focussing on Kavya Shree and Gagan Chinappa.

=== Supporting character getting own show (during run) ===
- Angel was a spin-off of Buffy the Vampire Slayer, based on the character of Angel. The series ran for five seasons.
- Private Practice was a spin-off of Grey's Anatomy, recounting the life of Dr. Addison Montgomery. The spin-off itself, introducing the show's cast, was set up during a season three episode of Grey's Anatomy. The series ran for six seasons.
- All in the Family is responsible for several spin-offs. Maude and The Jeffersons both featured characters that began on All in the Family. Good Times was later spun off from Maude, making it the first spin-off of a spin-off.
- The Mary Tyler Moore Show spun off Rhoda, Phyllis and Lou Grant based on supporting characters, as well as several unsuccessful series pilots and one TV movie.
- Hercules: The Legendary Journeys begat two spin-offs: Young Hercules, which relates the adventures of Hercules during his teenage years, and Xena: Warrior Princess which eventually outlasted its parent program.
- The Dukes of Hazzard spun off TV series Enos starring Deputy Enos Strate. He was invited to Los Angeles to join a special police team after he had caught two infamous criminals in Hazzard. The series was canceled after one season and the character returned to The Dukes of Hazzard.
- The British animated series Count Duckula was a spin-off of Danger Mouse and featured an anthropomorphic vampire duck named Count Duckula (a loose parody of Count Dracula).
- The series A Different World, a spin-off from The Cosby Show, was originally created as a vehicle for Lisa Bonet's character, Denise Huxtable. In an unusual turn of events, even though Bonet was written out of A Different World after the first season and returned to The Cosby Show, A Different World continued – and thrived – for another five seasons without her.
- The series Diff'rent Strokes spun off in 1979 one of NBC's longest running sitcoms, The Facts of Life, where Philip Drummond's housekeeper, Edna Garrett (played by Charlotte Rae), became housemother and dietitian in all-female boarding school called Eastland. Rae's character was very popular at the time and, at the end of the first season, she got her own show that lasted nine years, while the original series ended in 1986. At first, Rae didn't want to leave a hit series, so she got a deal that she could come back if the spinoff didn't last; but the show was renewed for a second season, so Mrs. Garrett was replaced by Adelaide Brubaker (Nedra Volz) first and by Pearl Gallagher (Mary Jo Catlett) then. She only made one guest appearance after four years from her departure.
- The Ropers was spun off from Three's Company. At the end of the third season, landlords Stanley and Helen Roper sold their apartment building and moved in another house in Cheviot Hills. Norman Fell and Audra Lindley got a deal that, if the spinoff didn't last, they could go back to the original series. The show was canceled at the end of its second season, only a few days after the deal expired, and the Ropers made only one guest appearance after two years from their departure on Three's Company, where they were replaced by Don Knotts, as new landlord Ralph Furley.
- The only daytime soap opera to spin off a primetime soap is As the World Turns. In 1965, the producers capitalized on the popularity of the character Lisa Miller Hughes and created a limited-run show for her character, called Our Private World. A year after the nighttime show ended, Eileen Fulton, Lisa's portrayer, returned to ATWT, where she remained until the soap's cancellation in 2010.
- Trapper John, M.D. was another spin-off from the movie M*A*S*H. When sued by the makers of the series M*A*S*H, the makers of Trapper John demonstrated in court that it was derived from the movie rather than the series.
- The BBC series Doctor Who is the show with the most spun off media, most of which concern supporting characters, although a few are simply set in the same fictional universe. The first, in 1981, was an unsuccessful pilot featuring Sarah Jane Smith, called K-9 and Company. The company Reeltime produced a series of short films, beginning with Wartime in 1987 and going on to include Downtime, Mindgame and several others. The independent production company BBV, on their part, produced and released a series of movies based on the series including the P.R.O.B.E. series, Shakedown: Return of the Sontarans, the Auton trilogy, Cyberon and others (they also produced a range of audio spin-offs). In 2006 the BBC launched another spin-off, Torchwood, aimed at a more adult audience and featuring Captain Jack Harkness from the revived series. The Sarah Jane Adventures began in 2007, it was a more child-oriented series than Doctor Who and was produced after a BBC request for a Young Doctor Who series was felt to be inappropriate by the makers of the programme, and was influenced by a deal struck with the makers of yet another spin-off, K-9, which also used the character in question and ran from 2009 to 2010. In 2016, another spin-off, Class, ran for a single series, debuting online before being broadcast on the main BBC network. In 2025, another spin-off began, The War Between the Land and the Sea, featuring both UNIT and the Sea Devils.
- The reality show Trauma: Life in the E.R. spawned two additional reality shows in the early 2000s from a set of Trauma episodes shot at New Orleans: Charity Hospital, Paramedics and Code Blue New Orleans.
- Kinnikuman spun off Tatakae!! Ramenman, which depicts Ramenman in his native country of China. However it is not the same Ramenman as in the series and is instead an ancestor of the main Ramenman.
- The Daily Show correspondent Stephen Colbert received his own show The Colbert Report, a parody of shows like The O'Reilly Factor.
- Family Guy supporting character Cleveland Brown was given his own show called The Cleveland Show.
- The Andy Griffith Show is an example of several different types of spin-offs. The show itself was a semi-spin-off of The Danny Thomas Show, through a backdoor pilot episode in which Thomas' character was stopped by Sheriff Andy Taylor (Andy Griffith) for speeding in the fictional town of Mayberry, North Carolina. When The Andy Griffith Show proved successful, the supporting character of Gomer Pyle (Jim Nabors) was spun off into Gomer Pyle, U.S.M.C. Finally, when Griffith left the show in 1968, it was re-tooled for three more seasons as Mayberry R.F.D.
- When Lauren Conrad left the reality series Laguna Beach: The Real Orange County, she began a new reality series The Hills, which in turn spawned The City when Whitney Port moved to New York.
- Family Matters is a spinoff of Perfect Strangers. Carl Winslow, the main character of Family Matters, was featured in an episode of Perfect Strangers. His wife Harriet Winslow was a regular cast member as the elevator operator in Perfect Strangers.
- Ravenswood is a spin-off to the popular series Pretty Little Liars. The show focused on the character Caleb Rivers is moving to Ravenswood. Only lasted one season, the character returned to the former show's fifth season.
- The Originals is a spin-off to the fantasy series The Vampire Diaries focusing on the former supporting characters Klaus, Elijah and Rebekah Mikaelson.
- The supporting character Buster from the children's TV show Arthur got a spin-off series with 2003's Postcards from Buster.
- Dil Boley Oberoi, an Indian soap opera is a spin-off of the television series Ishqbaaaz which focused on the characters Omkara and Rudra from the original series. Within few months, the spin-off merged with the parent series Ishqbaaaz.
- Kundali Bhagya, an Indian spin-off soap opera of Kumkum Bhagya, focuses on the story of Preeta and Shrishti.
- Yeh Rishte Hain Pyaar Ke is a spin-off series, which focuses on the supporting character Mishti from one of the longest running Indian soap opera Yeh Rishta Kya Kehlata Hai.
- The Casagrandes is a spin-off of the hit Nickelodeon series The Loud House. It is focused on the new lives of Bobby and Ronnie Anne Santiago as they move in with their extended family.
- Pearson is an upcoming spin-off of Suits centered around character Jessica Pearson as she embarks on a new journey in the political world of Chicago after being disbarred in New York City.

=== Supporting character getting own show (after original series ended) ===
- The long-running December Bride spun off the series Pete and Gladys starring Harry Morgan and Cara Williams. Harry Morgan's character, Pete Porter was a supporting character on December Bride, constantly complaining about his mother-in-law, as well as his wife Gladys, who was never seen in the December Bride show.
- Frasier is one of the most critically acclaimed and popular spin-off series of all time, based on the character Dr. Frasier Crane from the American sitcom Cheers. The series ran for eleven seasons (the same number as Cheers).
- The Green Green Grass was spun off from Only Fools and Horses, featuring the recurring characters of Boycie and Marlene moving from Peckham to the country.
- The Mary Tyler Moore Show spun off Lou Grant. This series was notable for being a rare example of a change in genre, from the original comedy to a drama.
- Three's a Crowd was another spinoff of Three's Company, where Jack Tripper (played by John Ritter) is now married and owner of a restaurant. The show was canceled after one season.
- Joey was spun off from long-running show Friends after the show's final season. The show focused on the character Joey Tribbiani moving to Los Angeles.
- Cory in the House was spun off after the series That's So Raven ended. It involves Cory and Victor moving to the White House; Raven has appeared as a guest-star.
- Highlander: The Raven was spun off from Highlander: The Series, featuring the recurring character of Amanda. Highlander: The Series was itself a spin-off from the Highlander film franchise, featuring a relative of the film's protagonist.
- Angelica and Susie's Pre-School Daze was spun off from Rugrats after the show ended the previous year, featuring recurring characters Angelica Pickles, Susie Carmichael, and Harold in pre-school. It is the second Rugrats spin-off series, following All Grown Up!.
- Clifford's Puppy Days is a spin-off to the Clifford show and it revolves Clifford's adventures as a puppy.
- Following Jackass, Bam Margera got his own show spotlighting him and his family, Viva La Bam and then another "Bam's Unholy Union"
- Michael Tse starred in the film Turning Point, which was spun off from the TVB serial E.U. to feature his popular character Laughing Gor. The film recounts Laughing's life before the events of E.U.. He later also starred in the TV series Lives of Omission which recounts Laughing's life after the events of E.U..
- The Australian show Mako: Island of Secrets is a spin-off from the show H_{2}O: Just Add Water.
- The character Sheen Estevez from The Adventures of Jimmy Neutron: Boy Genius stars in a spin-off known as Planet Sheen. Sheen crashes on an alien planet known as Zeenu after borrowing a rocket from Jimmy Neutron. After destroying his rocket by crashing into the alien antagonist Dorkus's home, he has to fix his broken rocket to get back to Earth.
- After Channel 4 sitcom Desmond's was brought to an end in 1994 by the death of Norman Beaton, who had portrayed the title character, another popular character was featured in a short-lived spinoff series, Porkpie.
- Sam & Cat is a spin-off of both iCarly and Victorious which focused on Sam Puckett (Jennette McCurdy of iCarly) leaving Seattle for Los Angeles to become a babysitter while becoming best friends with Cat Valentine (Ariana Grande of Victorious). It was the first TV spin-off from two shows.
- After the AMC series Breaking Bad concluded, Saul Goodman (portrayed by Bob Odenkirk), Walter White's lawyer-accomplice, earned his own prequel spin-off series, Better Call Saul.
- After The Closer ended, Captain Sharon Raydor became head of the Major Crimes Division in its spin-off of the same name, Major Crimes, replacing Deputy Chief Brenda Leigh Johnson, upon her departure.
- Just one year after CBS's show The Good Wife ended, creators Robert and Michelle King launched a spin-off called The Good Fight with Christine Baranski reprising her role as Diane Lockhart in the lead role.
- Ripley and Scuff from the CITV series Roger and the Rottentrolls were given their own series called Ripley and Scuff in 2002 in which the duo, alongside their sister Strid and baby barguest Bargie, visit schools across the UK and wreak havoc in them.
- Sergeant Lewis, the assistant to Inspector Morse, was promoted to inspector and main character in the Lewis television series six years after the original series ended with the death of Morse.
- Bunk'd was spun off from Jessie after it ended. It features the Ross kids (sans Luke) going to summer camp.
- D. J. Tanner, Stephanie Tanner, and Kimmy Gibbler from the sitcom Full House got their own show, Fuller House, in 2016. The series features recently widowed D. J. moving into her childhood home to raise her three sons. Her sister Stephanie, and her best friend Kimmy, as well as Kimmy's daughter, also move in. The show features cameos from characters from the original show and is also produced by John Stamos, who plays Uncle Jesse.

=== Shows from segments/episodes of anthology series ===
- The longest running and by far most successful spin-off is The Simpsons, which was created as a series of animated segments for the sketch series The Tracey Ullman Show, and featured the voices of four cast members.
- Mama's Family was a spin-off from a series of sketches called "The Family" on The Carol Burnett Show.
- Absolutely Fabulous was a spin-off from a sketch on French and Saunders.
- The Yogi Bear Show (1961) was the first animated spin-off, Yogi Bear having first appeared in 1958 in The Huckleberry Hound Show.
- The Cartoon Cartoon Show, then called The What a Cartoon! Show, featured a number of pilots for possible animated series on the Cartoon Network. Dexter's Laboratory was the first of those pilots to get its own show followed by Johnny Bravo, Cow and Chicken, The Powerpuff Girls and Courage the Cowardly Dog.
- I Am Weasel was originally a series of segments in Cow and Chicken. It was later separated and got its own series after Cow and Chicken production ceased.
- Happy Days, a spin-off from Love, American Style, also spun off multiple shows: Laverne & Shirley, Blansky's Beauties, Mork & Mindy, Out of the Blue and Joanie Loves Chachi. These shows resulted in spin-offs of their own: the animated series Laverne & Shirley in the Army, The Fonz and the Happy Days Gang, and The Mork & Mindy/Laverne & Shirley/Fonz Hour.
- Both the animated series Beavis and Butt-Head and Æon Flux were spun off of the MTV series Liquid Television. Daria then spun off from Beavis and Butt-head.
- Rugrats episode "All Growed Up" acted as the pilot for All Grown Up!.
- After Da Ali G Show, the three main characters all got their own spin-off movies: Ali G with Ali G Indahouse, Borat with Borat: Cultural Learnings of America for Make Benefit Glorious Nation of Kazakhstan, and Brüno with Brüno.
- XHDRBZ, a successor series to Derbez en Cuando, would spin off La familia P. Luche.
- El privilegio de mandar was originally a series of sketches on La parodia. It was later separated to become a weekly television series of its own.
- Hard Quiz is a spin-off of the "Hard Chat" segment on the satirical television news program The Weekly with Charlie Pickering.
- The Magic School Bus television series produced a spin-off Halloween special in live-action called A Magic School Bus Halloween, where Ms. Frizzle who disguises herself as an old peddler visits some students who are lost in a museum. It also uses the first-season episode "In the Haunted House" and the second-season episode "Going Batty".

=== TV franchises ===
- 24: Legacy is a spin off series of the American serial drama 24.
- Dallas, a hugely popular prime time soap opera, spawned its own successful spin-off series called Knots Landing. A continuation to the original Dallas series was also produced in 2012.
- EastEnders is a popular British soap opera that spawned several spinoffs. CivvyStreet was a one-off prequel set during World War II. Perfectly Frank was a short-lived series following a popular character after he left the parent show. In 2010, there was EastEnders: E20, a spin-off show on BBC3 which focuses on the teenage characters (but had cameos from the main cast), which had a limited number of episodes (compared to the soap which runs weekly). In 2017, the spin-off Kat & Alfie: Redwater saw popular characters, Kat and Alfie Moon, travel to Ireland in search of Kat's son.
- Hollyoaks Later is a spin off series of another popular British soap opera Hollyoaks.
- The Green Green Grass and Rock & Chips are both spin-offs from the British sitcom Only Fools and Horses. Rock & Chips is a prequel to Only Fools and Horses.
- Torchwood, The Sarah Jane Adventures, K-9 and Class are all spin-offs of the long-running BBC science-fiction drama Doctor Who; all apart from Class feature companions of the Doctor who appeared on the original program, while Class makes use of a recurring setting from the parent show.
- British police drama The Bill had spin offs called Burnside and MIT: Murder Investigation Team.
- Maude and The Jeffersons were both spin-offs from the sitcom All in the Family as were the less popular Gloria and 704 Hauser. Maude itself spun off Good Times while The Jeffersons spun off Checking In.
- The Mary Tyler Moore Show spun off Phyllis, Rhoda, and Lou Grant. It also inspired the television movie Mary and Rhoda.
- Frasier is a spin-off from NBC's Cheers, as was The Tortellis starring Dan Hedaya as Nick, Carla Tortelli's loutish ex-husband.
- Private Practice and Station 19 are spin-offs from Grey's Anatomy.
- JAG spawned NCIS, which later spun off both NCIS: Los Angeles and NCIS: New Orleans. Los Angeles retains characters from both NCIS and JAG, and has crossed over with several other series, including Hawaii Five-0.
- The Practice was a television series that ran for eight seasons on ABC and then was canceled. New characters who were introduced during the later seasons became so popular they became the main characters in a spin-off, Boston Legal, which ran for five more seasons—giving the franchise a 13-year total run. The show shared such similar characters in the same universe, the show began with the working title The Practice: Fleet Street, before the name was changed.
- Star Trek: The Next Generation (itself a sequel to the 1966 Star Trek) had three spin-offs: Star Trek: Deep Space Nine and Star Trek: Voyager.
- Stargate Atlantis, Stargate Universe and Stargate Infinity are spin-offs from the Stargate SG-1 television series, which was itself spun off from the film Stargate.
- Crusade is a spin-off of the original Babylon 5 series.
- The Law & Order series has spawned a total of 10 spin-offs: Law & Order: Special Victims Unit; Law & Order: Criminal Intent; Crime & Punishment (a documentary series as opposed to scripted drama); the short-lived Trial by Jury; Conviction; Paris enquêtes criminelles, a French adaptation of Criminal Intent; the British spin-off Law & Order: UK; the short-lived Law & Order: LA; and Russian adaptations of Special Victims Unit and Criminal Intent. A South African spin-off of the original series, Law & Order: Cape Town, also exists. More recently, the new addition to the Chicago franchise, Chicago Justice can also be considered a Law & Order, since the protagonist is the son of original Law & Order ADA Ben Stone.
- CSI: Crime Scene Investigation, produced by Jerry Bruckheimer, spun-off both CSI: Miami and CSI: Cyber, while CSI: Miami spun-off CSI: NY. CSI has crossed over with all three other franchise series, while Miami and NY have both crossed over with each other, and CSI. A three-way crossover has been done, while CSI lead Ted Danson also leads the cast of Cyber.
- Sabrina's Secret Life is a spin-off of Sabrina: The Animated Series, which itself was a spin-off of the 1996 version of Sabrina the Teenage Witch which was a spin-off of Sabrina and the Groovie Goolies which was a spin-off of The Archie Comedy Hour which was a sequel to The Archie Show.
- The VH1 celebreality show The Surreal Life has led to a long-running franchise of reality shows: The Surreal Life: Fame Games, My Fair Brady, The Salt-N-Pepa Show, and Strange Love.
  - Strange Love spun off three seasons of Flavor of Love. Additionally, Rock of Love can be seen as a conceptual spin-off of Flavor of Love (other than the similar name, it is a VH1 show featuring contestants vying for the love of a popular musician).
    - Contestants from Rock of Love's first and second seasons went on to appear in Rock of Love: Charm School.
    - Contestant Daisy De La Hoya from Season 2 of Rock of Love spun off her own show Daisy of Love. It additionally features David Amerman aka 12 Pack from season one of I Love New York as a contestant.
    - Contestant Megan Hauserman from Season 2 of Rock of Love spun off her own show Megan Wants a Millionaire, which was canceled due to controversy surrounding contestant Ryan Jenkins.
    - Contestants from the first two seasons of Flavor of Love went on to appear in Flavor of Love Girls: Charm School. Contestants from the third season went on to appear in Charm School with Ricki Lake.
    - Tiffany Pollard, a contestant in the first two seasons of Flavor of Love, went on to two seasons of I Love New York, in addition to New York Goes to Hollywood, and New York Goes to Work.
      - Contestants and brothers Kamal Givens and Ahmad Givens from the first season of I Love New York spun off two seasons of their own show, Real Chance of Love.
        - Contestants from Real Chance of Love went on to appear in Charm School with Ricki Lake.
    - Contestants from Flavor of Love, Rock of Love, I Love New York, and Real Chance of Love (many of whom have also appeared in other shows listed previously) have appeared on the two seasons of I Love Money. A third season was produced, featuring contestants from Rock of Love, Real Chance of Love, Daisy of Love, Megan Wants a Millionaire, and For the Love of Ray J. It was however canceled prior to airing because of controversy surrounding contestant Ryan Jenkins, who was also rumored to have been the winner.
- The Lone Gunmen was a spin-off of the popular science fiction series The X-Files.
- The popular teen drama Beverly Hills, 90210 (1990–2000) is at the root of its own franchise:
  - The original Melrose Place was spun off in 1992 and aired until 1999. It in turn spawned two other series:
    - Models Inc. (1994–95)
    - A second show titled Melrose Place (2009–10)
  - 90210, a second spinoff from the original series, began airing in 2008.
- The BBC show HolbyBlue is a spin-off of Holby City, which is itself a spin-off of Casualty. All shows are set within the fictional town of Holby, and characters from the various shows often appear in episodes of the other shows.
- The popular detective series Barnaby Jones began as the second part of a two part story-arc as a spin-off to Cannon.
- Postcards from Buster is a spin-off of the children's TV show Arthur (TV Series)
- Planet Sheen is a spin-off series based on Nickelodeon's Jimmy Neutron
- A Bear's Tail is a spin-off from Bo' Selecta!.
- Outsiders Inn is spin-off of Gone Country
- Kourtney and Khloé Take Miami is a spin-off from Keeping Up with the Kardashians.
- The Girls Next Door has spun off two shows featuring former regulars: Kendra and Holly's World.
- Thomas & Friends is based on The Railway Series.
- Shining Time Station is the American spin-off of Thomas & Friends to introduce the series to American viewers.
- Sesame Park, Plaza Sésamo, Big Bag, Play with Me Sesame, Panwapa and The Furchester Hotel are all spin-offs of the children's educational series Sesame Street.
- MTV's reality show The City is a spin-off of another reality show, The Hills, itself a spin-off of Laguna Beach.
- Mexican producer Carla Estrada planted the roots of her comedy franchise on La hora pico (2001–2007):
  - Several cast members of that series were also in the cast of La parodia which ran from 2004 to 2007.
    - El privilegio de mandar, which ran from 2005 to 2006, was spun off of La parodia.
    - Chiquitibum and Objectos perdidos also used the same cast.
- Eugenio Derbez' comedy franchise originated with the 1992 series Al derecho y al Derbez:
  - Its successor series include Derbez en Cuando, which ran from 1998 to 1999, and XHDRBZ which ran from 2002 to 2004.
    - La familia P. Luche, which ran off and on from 2003 to 2007, was spun off of XHDRBZ
    - Derbez also created and produced Hospital el Paisa which ran from 2004 to 2005.
- Several of Jorge Ortiz de Pinedo's late-1990s and 2000s comedy series were rooted in Al ritmo de la noche (1995–1998):
  - The schoolroom sketches became the genesis to Cero en conducta (1998–2002)
  - Many of the other sketches and guest appearances of popular Mexican comedians would evolve into Humor es...los comediantes (1999–2001). For the entirety of both programs' runs there was a certain interplay between those shows, with cast members of one series appearing on another (Ortiz de Pinedo, Carlos Espejel, and Shamila were regular cast members on both series, and Maria Alicia Delgado, Teo Gonzalez and Aida Pierce were regulars on one series and guests on another), and guest comedians on the latter series also guesting on the former.
    - Cero en conducta's sequel series was La Escuelita VIP (2005)
      - Ortiz de Pinedo invited back many of the same comedians who guested on the aforementioned series for Festival del humor (2002–2005) and Fabrica de risas (2006–2009).
      - Frequent Humor es...los Comediantes guest Mara Escalante starred in her own series Maria de todos los angeles (2009–present), playing several of the same characters she had portrayed on the former series, including the title character.
- Primeval: New World is a Canadian spin-off to the British sic-fi series Primeval.
- Bakuto Sengen Daigunder is a First spin-off in the series of original anime series Dennou Boukenki Webdiver.
- Kamiwaza Wanda is a Second spin-off in the series of original anime series Dennou Boukenki Webdiver.
- In the Marvel Cinematic Universe, Luke Cage and The Punisher are spin-offs of Jessica Jones and Daredevil, respectively.
- The Flash is a spin-off of Arrow. Both shows then jointly set up a second spin-off, Legends of Tomorrow.
- Newhart was revealed to be a surprise spin-off of The Bob Newhart Show when Bob awakens from sleep back on the older series to reveal the Newhart series was only a dream as former stated in List of Newhart episodes Series 8 Episode 24 "The Last Newhart".
- Yo Gabba Gabba! has a spin-off called Hi Baby Boo both have the same segments along with Yo Gabba Gabba!, and started on Kickstarter.
- Wednesday (TV series) is a spin-off of The Addams Family.

== Spin-offs of Internet properties ==
- The TV series Dr. Pimple Popper (2018–present) is a spin-off from the YouTube channel of American dermatologist Sandra Lee.
- Another current TV series, The Toe Bro (2019–present), is a spin-off of the YouTube channel of Canadian chiropodist Jonathan Tomines.

== In film ==
- The films Blade: The Iron Cross and Puppet Master: Doktor Death are spin-offs of the Puppet Master film series.
- The films Baby Oopsie, Baby Oopsie 2, Baby Oopsie 3: Burn Baby Burn and Demonic Toys: Jack-Attack are spin-offs of the Demonic Toys film series.
- The film K-9000 is a spin-off of the K-9 film series.
- The film Bates Motel is a spin-off of the Psycho franchise.
- The 2009 direct-to-DVD feature Legally Blondes is a spin-off to the Legally Blonde franchise.
- The High School Musical franchise spawned a spin-off movie, Sharpay's Fabulous Adventure (2011), in which Sharpay Evans (Ashley Tisdale) moves to New York to pursue her dream.
- The 1999 direct-to-video film Bartok the Magnificent is a spin-off to the 1997 film Anastasia, which focuses on a street performing albino bat named Bartok.
- The 2000 direct-to-video film Joseph: King of Dreams is a prequel spin-off to the 1998 film The Prince of Egypt
- Several superhero films have had spin-off films, some focusing on female heroines. Examples include Supergirl and Supergirl being a spin-offs of the Superman film series. Catwoman, Joker, Joker: Folie à Deux and Clayface being a spin-offs of the Batman film series. Elektra being a spin-off of Daredevil. Birds of Prey is a spin-off from Suicide Squad and Black Adam is a spin-off from Shazam!.
- The X-Men film series spawned several spin-offs: X-Men Origins: Wolverine, The Wolverine, Logan, and Deadpool, which retells the origins of Deadpool. Due to the success of the film, it spawned a sequels: Deadpool 2, which was released in 2018 and Deadpool & Wolverine, which was released in 2024. The New Mutants is also a spin-off of the X-Men film series.
- The movie Beauty Shop is viewed as the spin-off to the Barbershop franchise.
- The movies Star Wars Holiday Special, Caravan of Courage: An Ewok Adventure, Ewoks: The Battle for Endor and Star Wars: The Clone Wars are spin-offs of the Star Wars franchise. The newest spin-off films are Rogue One in 2016, Solo: A Star Wars Story in 2018, The Mandalorian and Grogu in 2026 and Star Wars: Starfighter in 2027.
- The film The Lion King 1½ is a prequel, sidequel and spin-off from The Lion King franchise about the characters Timon and Pumbaa.
- Turning Point is a spin-off of TVB's E.U. which focuses on the life of Michael Tse's character, "Laughing", before the events of E.U..
- Supercop 2 is a spin-off of the Police Story film series but commonly misrepresented as a sequel.
- The Scorpion King, The Scorpion King 2: Rise of a Warrior, The Scorpion King 3: Battle for Redemption, The Scorpion King 4: Quest for Power, The Scorpion King: Book of Souls are spin-offs of The Mummy franchise, in which The Scorpion King, an antagonist from The Mummy Returns, is the protagonist.
- Kronk's New Groove is a sequel and spin-off of The Emperor's New Groove franchise, which focuses on the villain henchman, Kronk.
- Get Him to the Greek is a spin-off from Forgetting Sarah Marshall that focuses on the character, Aldous Snow.
- The 3D films Puss in Boots and Puss in Boots: The Last Wish are spin-offs from the Shrek franchise about the character Puss. It received its own spin-off television series set after the movie called The Adventures of Puss in Boots.
- The 3D movie Lightyear is a spin-off of the Toy Story franchise depicting the in-universe origin story of the fictional human character Buzz Lightyear.
- The animated short film BURN-E is a parallel spin-off from the feature-length movie WALL-E.
- The 3D films Planes and Planes: Fire & Rescue, produced by the now-defunct Disneytoon Studios, are spin-offs of the Cars franchise.
- The 3D movies The Lego Batman Movie and The Lego Ninjago Movie are spin-offs of the Lego Movie franchise.
- The 3D film Sherlock Gnomes is a sequel and spin-off of Gnomeo & Juliet.
- My Little Pony: Equestria Girls is a 2013 spin-off film of the animated television series My Little Pony: Friendship Is Magic. It received three sequels.
- The 3D film Penguins of Madagascar is a spin-off of the Madagascar franchise.
- The Shaun the Sheep television series, which is a spin-off from the Aardman series Wallace and Gromit, has two spin-offs of its own, Shaun the Sheep Movie which was released in February 2015, and Timmy Time, a television show primarily aimed at young children, and the movie sequel A Shaun the Sheep Movie: Farmageddon.
- The movies Jackass Presents: Mat Hoffman's Tribute to Evel Knievel and Jackass Presents: Bad Grandpa are spin-offs of the Jackass franchise.
- The movies Lavalantula and 2 Lava 2 Lantula are spin-offs of the Sharknado film series.
- The movies Creed, Creed II and Creed III are spin-offs of the Rocky franchise about the character Adonis Creed.
- Fantastic Beasts and Where to Find Them which was released in 2016 is a spin-off of the Harry Potter film series and marked the beginning of a planned five part prequel verse which together forms the Wizarding World franchise. A second installment Fantastic Beasts: The Crimes of Grindelwald was released in November 2018. A third installment Fantastic Beasts: The Secrets of Dumbledore, is scheduled for release on April 15, 2022.
- The film National Lampoon's Christmas Vacation 2, released in December 2003, is a spin-off of the National Lampoon's Vacation film series.
- The film Hobbs & Shaw, released in August 2019, is a spin-off of the Fast & Furious franchise.
- The film Daphne & Velma, released in May 2018, is a spin-off of the Scooby-Doo film series.
- The movies Scanner Cop and Scanners: The Showdown are spin-offs of the Scanners film series.
- The film Ocean's 8, released in June 2018, is a spin-off of the Ocean's film series.
- The movies American Pie Presents: Band Camp, American Pie Presents: The Naked Mile, American Pie Presents: Beta House American Pie Presents: The Book of Love and American Pie Presents: Girls' Rules are spin-offs of the American Pie film series.
- The film The Ice Age Adventures of Buck Wild, released in January 2022, is a spin-off of the Ice Age franchise.
- In the 90s, Disney's direct-to-home video series Disney Sing-Along Songs produced live-action spin-off videos, including the 1990 video, Disneyland Fun.
- The film Star Trek: Section 31, released in January 2025, is a spin-off of the Star Trek franchise.
- The film Furiosa: A Mad Max Saga, released in May 2024, is a spin-off of the Mad Max franchise.
- The film Ballerina, released in June 2025, is a spin-off of the John Wick franchise.
- The film Paranormal Activity: The Marked Ones, released in January 2014, is a spin-off of the Paranormal Activity franchise.
- The film Spiral, released in May 2021, is a spin-off of the Saw franchise.
- The movies Annabelle, Annabelle: Creation, The Nun, Annabelle Comes Home and The Nun II are spin-offs of The Conjuring Universe.
- The film Hawk's Vengeance, released in September 1996, is a spin-off of the Snake Eater film series.
- The film Street Fighter: The Legend of Chun-Li, released in February 2009, is a spin-off of the Street Fighter franchise.
- The film Chantal im Märchenland is a spin-off of the popular Fack ju Göhte film series.

== In video games ==
Spin-offs frequently occur in video games.

- Super Mario: Video games based on this series' side characters include the Wario, Luigi and Yoshi series, as well as Super Princess Peach and Captain Toad: Treasure Tracker. The Super Mario Bros. video game series itself spun-off from Donkey Kong. In fact, Mario has many spin-offs, such as Mario Party, Mario Kart, Paper Mario, Mario & Luigi and the various Mario sports games.
- Viper Phase 1 began as a spin-off from the Raiden series.
- The Nina Williams game Death by Degrees was a spin-off from the Tekken series.
- Mat Hoffman's Pro BMX, Mat Hoffman's Pro BMX 2, Shaun Palmer's Pro Snowboarder and Kelly Slater's Pro Surfer are spin-offs of Tony Hawk's series.
- Freshly-Picked Tingle's Rosy Rupeeland, Tingle's Balloon Fight DS and Hyrule Warriors are spin-offs of The Legend of Zelda Series.
- Pokémon Ranger and Pokémon Mystery Dungeon are spin-off series from the Pokémon series.
- Angry Birds Stella is a female game spin-off to the Angry Birds games.
- Bejeweled Blitz and Bejeweled Twist are spin-offs in the Bejeweled series.
- Final Fantasy Crystal Chronicles and Final Fantasy Tactics are spin-off series from the Final Fantasy series.
- Prinny: Can I Really Be the Hero? and Prinny 2: Dawn of Operation Panties, Dood! are spin-offs of the Disgaea series, featuring the creature known as the Prinny.
- Sonic the Hedgehog has a handful of spin-off titles and series including Flicky, Dr. Robotnik's Mean Bean Machine, Tails' Skypatrol, Knuckles' Chaotix, Tails Adventure, Shadow the Hedgehog, the Sonic Riders series and the Sonic Boom series.
- Uru: Ages Beyond Myst is the spin-off game from Myst and it is between the time after Myst IV: Revelation and before Myst V: End of Ages.
- The Raving Rabbids series is a spin-off of the Rayman series.
- The Tales series has a number of spin-off titles, most notably the Tales of the World series and Tales of Symphonia: Dawn of the New World.
- Call of Duty: World at War – Zombies is a spin-off of the Nazi Zombies feature in Call of Duty: World at War, but on the iPhone.
- Lara Croft and the Guardian of Light from the Tomb Raider series, first spin-off in the series
- The Age of Mythology is a spin-off of the Age of Empires series.
- The Misadventures of Tron Bonne is a spin-off of the Megaman Legends series.
- Metal Gear Rising: Revengeance is a spin-off of the Metal Gear Solid series, but still considered part of the main timeline, though the gameplay is a Hack and slash rather than a Stealth game.
- Spirit Camera: The Cursed Memoir is a spin-off of the Fatal Frame series.
- Crisis Zone and Time Crisis: Project Titan series are spin-off of the Time Crisis series
- Dynasty Warriors series is a spin-off of the Romance of the Three Kingdoms series.
- Gargoyle's Quest is a series that focuses on Firebrand, an antagonist from the Ghosts 'n Goblins series. The latter also is host to another spin-off, the Maximo series.
- The Kingdom Hearts series features a good number of spin offs that greatly expanded the plot of the mainline games, notably there are 4 handheld games and a smartphone game released between the 2005's Kingdom Hearts II and 2019's Kingdom Hearts III, all of which expanded the original thread of the story.
- Um Jammer Lammy is a spin off sequel to PaRappa the Rapper

== In comics ==
Supporting characters in comic books, who then got their own titles, include:

- The Action Chick is a spin-off of The Ongoing Adventures of Rocket Llama by Alex Langley.
- Agente Alien is a spin-off of Gli Aristocratici by Alfredo Castelli and Ferdinando Tacconi.
- Batwoman and Batgirl are female spin-offs of the popular Batman series. The comic series Anarky was also a spin-off of Batman.
- Bea is a spin-off of Dennis the Menace and Gnasher, centered around Dennis' baby sister.
- Bessie Bunter, in essence a female version of Billy Bunter by Frank Richards got so popular by herself that she got her own comic strip, aimed a girls' audience.
- Bidule is a spin-off of Cubitus by Dupa, featuring baby characters of the main cast. It is drawn by Michel Rodrigue.
- Bristow originated from Frank Dickens' earlier comic Oddbod.
- The Bunty Boys by Herbert Sydney Foxwell originated from The Bruin Boys (aka Tiger Tim). The original comic featured anthropomorphized animals, but the spin-off made them human characters.
- Buster Capp was a spin-off of Andy Capp, despite not being drawn by Reg Smythe, but Bill Titcombe and Hugh McNeill. It centered around the so-called son of Andy.
- Blueberry spawned out of the original comics series "Fort Navajo" in 1963, but after a few stories breakout character "Blueberry" got his own spin-off and the series continued under this title. The older "Fort Navajo" stories are available under the name "Blueberry" too. Other spin-offs, such as "La Jeunesse de Blueberry" and "Marshall Blueberry", were created too.
- Corinne et Jeannot by Jean Tabary, a spin-off of Tabary's earlier series Totoche.
- Cowboy Henk originated in a one-shot comic by Kamagurka named Meneerke Plagiaat.
- Cuddly and Dudley by Jim Turnbull (among others), a spin-off of Dudley D. Watkins' Biffo the Bear, revolving around Bimbo's niece.
- Dorothea by William St. John Glenn was a spin-off of his earlier comic Oscar.
- Dr. Lion's Boys is a spin-off of Jungle Jinks by Mabel F. Taylor, a series originally created by Arthur White.
- Erwin de Noorman is a spin-off series of Hans G. Kresse's popular comic strip Eric de Noorman, built around the protagonist's son.
- Fatty Fudge is a spin-off of Minnie the Minx.
- Fat Freddy's Cat is a spin-off of The Fabulous Furry Freak Brothers.
- Het Generaaltje (2018) is a spin-off by Vick Debergh, based on Peter de Smet's comic strip De Generaal.
- De Grappen van Lambik was a spin-off gag-a-day series built around the popular break-out character Lambik from the Suske en Wiske series.
- Grimly Feendish is a spin-off of Leo Baxendale's earlier Eagle Eye, Junior Spy.
- Håkan Bråkan is a spin-off from the Sune series.
- Hawkgirl was originally introduced as Hawkman's partner, but later received her own successful spin-off series.
- Hoerke, a spin-off of Boerke (Dickie) by Pieter De Poortere.
- Hi & Lois by Mort Walker and Dik Browne is a spin-off of Beetle Bailey, based on Beetle's sister Lois.
- Howard the Duck was created in 1973 by Steve Gerber and Val Mayerik in Adventure into Fear as a secondary character in that comic's Man-Thing feature. By 1976 he had become popular enough to star in his own comic strip.
- Jack of Fables, a spin-off from the DC Vertigo comic Fables.
- Jane, Daughter of Jane by Alfred Mazure, was a spin-off of Norman Pett's Jane.
- Jerom was a 1962 spin-off of the popular character from the Suske en Wiske franchise. It was notably very successful in German translations.
- John Darling (1979–1991) and Crankshaft (1987–ongoing) are both spin-offs of Funky Winkerbean (1972–ongoing).
- Karlijn, Catootje en de Ouders and De Rode Kater are both a spin-off of Jan Kruis's Jack, Jacky and the Juniors.
- The Adventures Of Kid Lucky is a juvenile spin-off of Lucky Luke for very young children.
- Kiligolo a spin-off created around the pet monkey of Perlin and Pinpin, from Maurice Cuvillier's series Perlin and Pinpin, created by Cuvillier's successor Claude Dubois.
- Krazy Kat was originally a character in George Herriman's predecessing series The Dingbat Family, but got his own comic strip series three years later, which has eventually eclipsed it in fame and popularity.
- Klein Suske en Wiske is a juvenile spin-off of Suske en Wiske for toddlers.
- The Legion of Super-Heroes, who first appeared in Superboy, which in turn was a spin-off from Superman.
- Little Iodine was a spin-off of They'll Do It Every Time.
- Marsupilami first appeared in the Spirou et Fantasio in 1952. He became a popular side character in a few albums. In 1987 he was given his own spin-off series, which depicts him living in his original jungle environment again. Between 2011 and 2013 this series in itself spawned another short-lived spin-off series based on his children, called Marsu Kids.
- Mr. Jack was a spin-off of Jimmy Swinnerton's earlier comic The Little Tigers.
- Ms. Marvel is a spin-off of Captain Marvel.
- The Mutanimals is a spinoff of the Teenage Mutant Ninja Turtles Adventures.
- Nancy was introduced in 1933 in the comic strip Fritzi Ritz by Ernie Bushmiller as Fritzi's niece. By 1938 the title was changed into Nancy.
- Nero was a side character in Marc Sleen's The Adventures of Detective Van Zwam, but proved so popular with readers that the series was named after him instead: The Adventures of Nero.
- Oomuro-ke is a spin-off of the manga YuruYuri created by Namori that focuses on supporting character Sakurako Ohmuro and her sisters Nadeshiko and Hanako. It debuted on July 2, 2012.
- Oscar and Adolph, a spin-off of A.D. Condo's Mr. Skygack, from Mars.
- Pantoufle, a spin-off of Raymond Macherot's Sibylline.
- Patoruzú was originally only a side character in Quinterno's series "Don Gil Contento", but became so popular with readers that the comic was renamed after him. Patoruzú in his turn also inspired the spin-off Isidoro Cañones.
- Le Petit Rahan by Roger Lécureux and André Chéret is a spin-off of Rahan.
- Le Petit Spirou is a spin-off of Spirou et Fantasio starring a juvenile version of the character, drawn by Philippe Tome and Janry.
- Perry and the Rinkydinks (1923) was a spin-off of Winnie Winkle (1920–1996), centering around her little brother Perry.
- Pete's Pup, a spin-off of Clarence D. Russell's Pete the Tramp, built around Pete's dog.
- Phil Fumble, a spin-off of Fritzi Ritz, created by Ernie Bushmiller.
- Pugacioff originated in the series Cucciolo.
- Says Smiffy (1971–1972), Plug (1977–1979), Simply Smiffy (1985–1986), Winston (2012–2013), Pup Parade (1967–1988) and Singled Out (2004–2009) were all spin-offs of The Bash Street Kids (1954–...).
- Popeye was introduced as a minor character in the popular Thimble Theatre series in 1929. He became the shows's break-out character and the entire series was named after him.
- Rantanplan, a popular side character in the Lucky Luke franchise, received his own spin-off series in 1987.
- Sam and Twitch (1999–...) is a spin-off of Spawn.
- Sarge Snorkel by Greg Walker is a spin-off of Mort Walker's Beetle Bailey.
- Schanulleke is a spin-off gag-a-day comic built around Wiske's doll from the Suske en Wiske franchise. It was drawn by Eric de Rop and scripted by Patty Klein.
- She-Hulk is a spin-off series of The Incredible Hulk.
- Skookum School (1973–1975) inspired two spin-offs, "Spookum School" (1974–1975) and "The Snookums" (1975).
- The Smurfs made their debut in a Johan and Peewit album in 1958 before getting a series of their own.
- Snake Tales, an Australian gag-a-day comic was originally titled The Old Timer when it debuted in 1974. Only when the character Snake was introduced two years later did the comic become more popular, too the point that the entire series was renamed after him in 1978.
- Son of Jonah was a spin-off of Jonah and was published from 1992 to 1993, drawn by Jerry Swaffield.
- Sophie by Jidéhem is a spin-off of Starter by the same artist.
- Spider-Woman, created in 1977 and immediately given her own series to prevent other companies from using the name, is a spin-off from Spider-Man.
- Star Wars: Darth Vader Down is a spinoff of the comic Star Wars: Darth Vader, which in itself is a spin-off of Star Wars (2015 comic book), which is a spin-off of the film Star Wars: A New Hope.
- Star Wars (2015 comic book) has two other spin-offs, Star Wars: Chewbacca and Star Wars: Princess Leia.
- The film Star Wars: Return of the Jedi has 3 spin-off books, Star Wars: Aftermath, Star Wars: Shattered Empire and Star Wars: C-3PO.
- Supergirl and Superman's Girl Friend, Lois Lane are both spin-off series of Superman.
- Tiger Tilly and the Hippo Girls by Herbert Sydney Foxwell was a female spin-off of Tiger Tim.
- The Three Bears and Baby Face Finlayson are spin-offs of Leo Baxendale's earlier series Little Plum.
- Tsjoem, a spin-off revolving around the parrot Tsjoem, a side character from Ray Goossens' earlier comics series Snops.
- Uncle Scrooge was introduced as Donald Duck's uncle in 1947 and became the comic strip's breakout character. In 1952 Scrooge received his own successful spin-off series which is still in syndication as of today.
- Ur Klackamo Dagbok is a spin-off by Gunnar Persson of Kronblom.
- Valentina by Guido Crepax originated as a minor character in Neutron.
- Vertongen & Co. is a 2011 spin-off of the Belgian comic strip series F.C. De Kampioenen.
- Wendy the Good Little Witch was originally a companion of Casper the Friendly Ghost before she got her own series.
- Young Marvels was a spin-off of Captain Marvel, though not as successful.
- Young Master Q is a spin-off of Old Master Q.

== In novels ==
- Adventures of Huckleberry Finn (1884) by Mark Twain is a spin-off of his earlier novel The Adventures of Tom Sawyer (1876).
- The Field Bazaar (1896) is a spin-off from the accepted Canon of Sherlock Holmes.

=== 20th century ===
- The Eternal Lover and The Mad King are spin-offs from Tarzan (book series) (1912–1966).
- Wide Sargasso Sea (1966) is an unofficial spin-off of Jane Eyre (1847)
- The Flashman Papers (1969) is an unofficial spin off from Tom Brown's School Days (1857).

=== 21st century ===
- Fantastic Beasts and Where to Find Them (2001) and the companion books The Tales of Beedle the bard and Quidditch Through the Ages are all spin-offs of the Harry Potter series (1997–2007).
- The Moneypenny Diaries (2005–2008) is a spin-off from the canon of James Bond.
- The Enola Holmes Mysteries (2006–2010) is a spin-off from the Canon of Sherlock Holmes.
- Heroes of Olympus (2010–2014), a book series by Rick Riordan, is a spin-off of Percy Jackson & the Olympians series (2005–2009). The companion novels The Demigod Files and The Demigod Diaries are spin-offs of both series, while the series Magnus Chase and the Gods of Asgard (2015–2017) takes place in the same continuity and features a cousin of one of the protagonists of the two.
  - The series Magnus Chase & The Gods of Asgard is a spin-off of both the Percy Jackson and Heroes of Olympus book series, with Annabeth Chase, a character from those series appearing.
  - The short stories The Son of Sobek (2013) and The Staff of Serapis (2014) are both spin-offs and crossovers of the Percy Jackson & the Olympians and The Kane Chronicles (2010–2012) series, both by Riordan.
- Bloodlines (2011–2015), a book series by American author Richelle Mead, is a spin-off from the Vampire Academy series (2007–2010).
- Midnight Sun (2020) and The Short Second Life of Bree Tanner (2010), a spin-off from the Twilight series (2005–2008)
- Diary of an Awesome Friendly Kid: Rowley Jefferson's Journal is a spin-off from Diary of a Wimpy Kid.

== See also ==
- Crossover (fiction)
- Digression
- Expanded universe
- List of television spinoffs
- Spiritual successor
