= Spiff and Hercules =

French animated television series

- Based on: Pif le chien by: José Cabrero Arnal
- Country of origin: France
- No. of seasons: 1
- No. of episodes: 130

Production
- Running time: 13 minutes

Original release
- Network: TF1
- Release: November 12 – December 31, 1989

Spiff and Hercules is a French comic strip titled featuring an anthropomorphic brown-yellow dog named Spiff and a black-white cat named Hercules, who, despite being best friends, are constantly fighting in a friendship/hate relationship. The character Spiff was created by José Cabrero Arnal for the French Communist Party newspaper L'Humanité on 28 March 1948 and the cat Hercules was introduced two years later. The characters' nemesis is Krapulax, who despite his infant-like features always has a diabolical plot in store.

Spiff later got his own magazine Pif Gadget, which was very popular as not only did it include several different comic strips, but offered a toy gadget in each issue. He was also the magazine's mascot. Hercules also got his own version of Spiff's magazine, this one called Super Hercules, but his magazine was more joke-oriented. A series of 65 26-minute animated cartoons featuring the characters was produced in 1989 by Europe Images/M5 in France. Each program consisted of two episodes. United Kingdom television station Channel 4 aired the series in 1993.

The adventures of Spiff also appeared as Spiff and Hercules in English translation in the British communist newspaper the Daily Worker (later The Morning Star) until the mid-1970s.

== Animated series ==
=== Episodes ===
- 001. La guerre du feu
- 002. Taxi folies
- 003. Main basse sur l'orteil sacré
- 004. Suspicion
- 005. Farfouille s'embrouille
- 006. A la poursuite du grodeoptère
- 007. Ballade pour une valise
- 008. Hold up on the rock
- 009. Chercheurs d'or
- 010. Coup dur pour la sculpture
- 011. Pif détective
- 012. Père Noël en stock
- 013. La croisière infernale
- 014. Hot dog mic mac
- 015. Drôle de bobine
- 016. Herculopolis
- 017. Duel
- 018. Chut bébé dort
- 019. On a volé Sésame
- 020. Grand hôtel
- 021. Le match du siècle
- 022. Mini plaies mini bosses
- 023. Pif et la boule de cristal
- 024. Du rififi sur l'île
- 025. Le fakir va au tapis
- 026. Les toqués de la grande cuisine
- 027. Descente aux enfers
- 028. Pif et Hercule au bagne
- 029. Les as du ciel
- 030. Nos amis les bêtes
- 031. Les chevaliers de la Table Ronde
- 032. Pif et Hercule vont au ciel
- 033. Les vacances de Pif
- 034. Obstruction votre honneur
- 035. Farfouille suscite des vocations
- 036. Le fantôme misanthrope
- 037. Deux faux mages bien faits
- 038. N'oubliez pas le guide
- 039. Pôles d'attractions
- 040. Les envahisseurs
- 041. Têtes de l'art
- 042. Jour de chance
- 043. Pif et Hercule mènent la danse
- 044. Incident spatio temporel
- 045. Un peu mon neveu
- 046. Scoop toujours
- 047. C'est d'un commun
- 048. Week-end à Zutcote
- 049. Bon anniversaire
- 050. Gare au gourou
- 051. Hoquet choc
- 052. Pifok contre Herculax
- 053. Rien ne va plus au Matuvu
- 054. Un bateau pour Noidkoko
- 055. Le génie porte malheur
- 056. L'invention du siècle
- 057. Rubis sur l'ongle
- 058. En avant marche
- 059. Farfouille aux trousses
- 060. Mieux vaut appeller un chat un chat
- 061. L'héritage
- 062. Boom sur le violon
- 063. Promotion sur la prison
- 064. Hallucinations
- 065. Gros Talent a disparu
- 066. À vot'service m'sieur Grochoux
- 067. Farfouille et débrouille
- 068. Baby sitting bull
- 069. Viva Herculapatas
- 070. Taxi cassé
- 071. Rencontre du 3ème type
- 072. La crise d'Hercule
- 073. Les voies du ciel
- 074. Le SAMU s'amuse
- 075. Coquin de sort
- 076. Hot dog party
- 077. Faites un vœu qu'il disait
- 078. Hercule chasse la prime
- 079. Piques sous les tropiques
- 080. Tour de piste
- 081. Les mémoires d'Hercule
- 082. Le maître du monde
- 083. Pif et Hercule cascadeurs
- 084. Yéti et chuchotement
- 085. Le contrat
- 086. Pif des bois
- 087. Love story
- 088. Casse à tous les étages
- 089. Coup de froid
- 090. Le casse du siècle
- 091. Un amour de trésor
- 092. Pif et Hercule gladiateurs
- 093. La conquête de l'ouest
- 094. Paris Sud
- 095. Chaperon rouge et compagnie
- 096. Bon appétit shérif
- 097. Et que ça brille
- 098. Pas de pitié pour les bronzés
- 099. Les deux mousquetaires
- 100. Cessez le feu
- 101. Pif fait une cure
- 102. Les drôles d'oiseaux
- 103. Panique dans la bande
- 104. Dépan télé
- 105. L'île aux trésors
- 106. La guerre des trois
- 107. Hercule disparaît
- 108. Du gag à la hune
- 109. Souvenirs
- 110. La guerre des robots
- 111. Pif FM contre Radio Hercule
- 112. Hercule fait fortune
- 113. Astronautes
- 114. Cancres et chouchoux
- 115. Salade tyrolienne
- 116. Le cauchemar de Farfouille
- 117. Le coup du siècle
- 118. Le blues sur le lagon
- 119. Les frères de l'entrecôte
- 120. Hercule se met à table
- 121. Omnibus pour Roccoco
- 122. Le grand sommeil
- 123. Une partie de campagne
- 124. Super Pif contre Super Herculeman
- 125. Drôles de jeux
- 126. Gare aux fantômes
- 127. Aïe mon neveu
- 128. Les travaux d'Hercule
- 129. À l'aide les fans sont là
- 130. Échec et mat pour Hercule

=== Outsourced production work ===
- Studio S.E.K.

== International titles ==
- بيف وهيركول (Arabic)
- بيف وهيركول (Arabic, Basma Channel title)
- Spiff e Hércules (Brazilian)
- Пиф и Еркюл - Pif i Erkjul (Bulgarian)
- Pif a Herkules (Czech)
- Spiff and Hercules (English)
- Pif ja Herkules/Jeppe ja Kolli (Finnish)
- Pif et Hercules (French)
- Piff und Herkules (German)
- Πιφ και Ηρακλής (Greek)
- Pif és Herkules (Hungarian)
- Pif dan di Herkule (Indonesian)
- פיף ותלתול (Piff VeTaltol) (Israeli)
- Pippo e Menelao (Italian)
- Pifa piedzīvojumi (Latvian)
- Pif i Herkules (Polish)
- Pif e Hercule (Portuguese)
- Pif şi Hercule (Romanian)
- Пиф и Геркулес (Russian)
- Pif y Hércules (Spanish)
- Pif och Hercule (Swedish)
