= François Corteggiani =

French comics artist and writer (1953–2022)

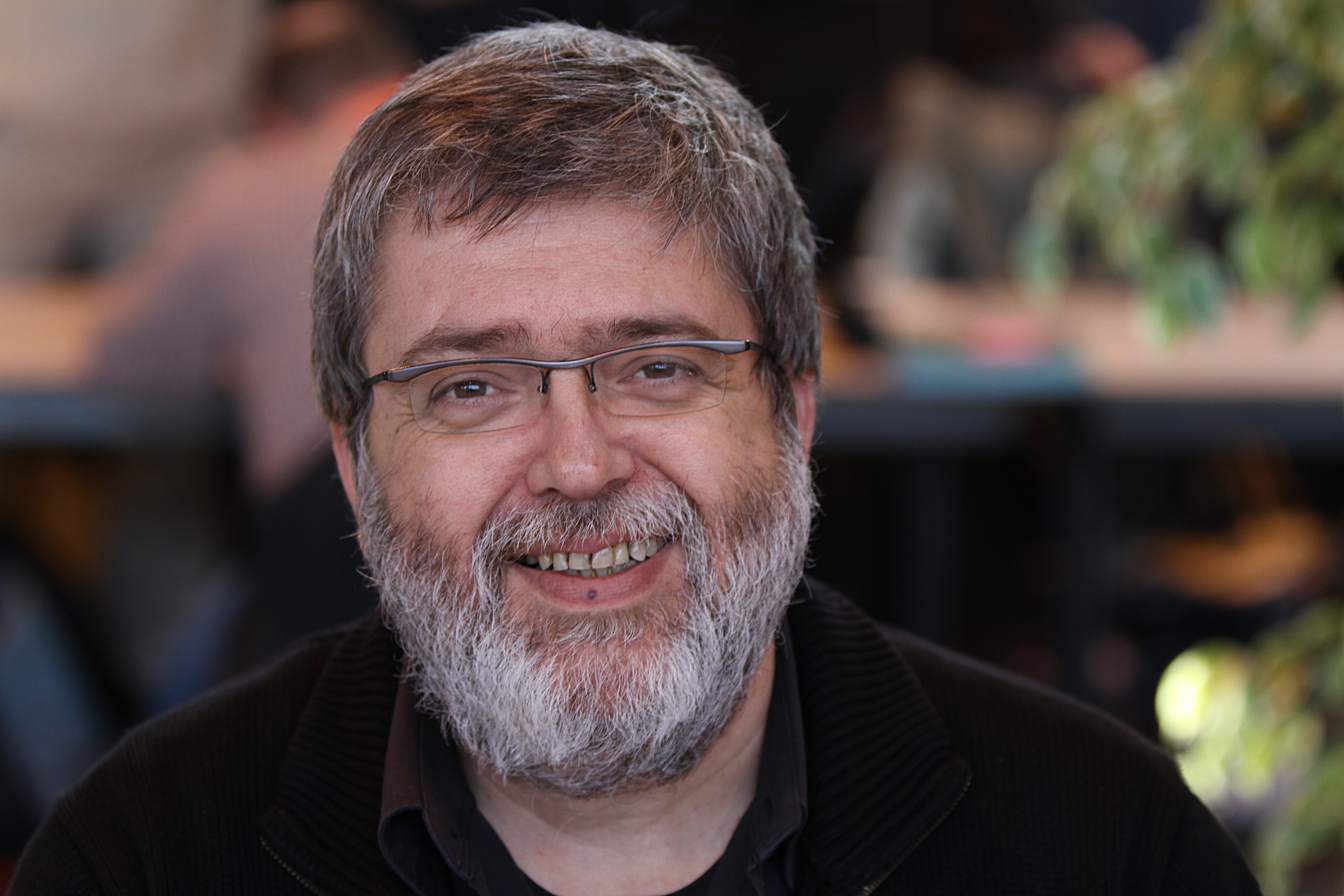
- Corteggiani in 2010
- Born: 21 September 1953 Nice, France
- Died: 21 September 2022 (aged 69) Carpentras, France
- Areas: Artist, writer
- Awards: U Giancu's Prize, 1999

François Corteggiani (21 September 1953 – 21 September 2022) was a French comics artist and writer.

== Biography ==
He was born on 21 September 1953 in France. He got a degree in art before becoming an artist for advertising. He created his first comic in 1974 for S.E.P.P. and Mucheroum for Spirou magazine. He illustrated works for various magazines and then, along with Michel Motti, he drew Pif le chien for Pif gadget. He also produced Disney comics for Le Journal de Mickey.

Taking over more work as scenarist, Corteggiani wrote for several series, among others succeeding Jean-Michel Charlier as writer for Young Blueberry. He died on his 69th birthday.
