= Plug (comics) =

British comic magazine (1977–1979)

Plug was a British comic magazine that ran for 75 issues from 24 September 1977 until 24 February 1979, when it merged with The Beezer. It was edited by Ian Gray.

A spin-off from The Bash Street Kids comic strip in The Beano, the comic was based on the character Plug who was a distinctively ugly member of the Bash Street Kids. His dog (Pug) from Pup Parade, and a new character called Chunkee the Monkey (Plug's pet monkey) accompanied him. Vic Neill mainly drew the title character's strip. The comic also had its own fan club, the Plug Sports and Social Club. The comic was inspired in part by Mad.

The Plug comic was never a big hit, possibly because, at 9 pence, it was too expensive compared to other D. C. Thomson comics at the time, which were priced at around 5 pence. According to the 2008 book The History of the Beano, for a while there were rumours of a "curse of Plug", fuelled by the fact that a number of celebrities featured in Mad magazine-style caricatures on the comic's cover died soon after, most notably John Wayne. However, the strip's use of gravure painting is still used in comics today.

== List of Plug comic strips ==
Strip Title	Artist	First Appearance	Last Appearance	Notes
Antchester United	John Geering	1	75	The adventures of an insect football team. Survived merger with the Beezer.
Ava Banana		1	18	Ava was a female athlete "strong as an ox, gentle as a lamb". Her trainer was Charlton Veston, their names being plays on Ava Gardner and Charlton Heston
The Bandshees		1	42	Creatures playing in a band, "fresh from their successful tour of Mars". Readers were invited to send in funny songs that they had written
Bedtime Story		36	50	Text story
Crazy Horse - The Nutty Nag		19	75	The adventures of a talking horse
Digby the Human Mole	Gordon Bell	1	75	A prisoner who constantly failed to escape from jail by digging tunnels. He had a huge mole-like nose and an enormous appetite.
Doctor Rotcod and Drib		44	75	
D'ye Ken John Squeal and his Hopeless Hounds		44	75	A daft celebration of fox hunting. Its title parodied an 18th-century Scottish ballad.
Eddie Daring		27	43	A boy obsessed with rugby league, with Randolph, his pet rat (The Original Dirty Rat). His name was a play on Eddie Waring, a popular TV sports commentator at the time.
Eebagoom		1	75	The ancient British settlement of Liverpool invaded by Julius Sneezer and his Roman legions. Survived merger with the Beezer.
First Ada	Gordon Bell	1	75	Always willing to practise her first aid on any unsuspecting passer-by. Ada also had a St. Bernard dog as her companion. Survived merger with the Beezer.
The Games Gang - They're Game for Everything.		1	43	Starred Meltem John, Bee-Bop, Fuzz, Rocky, Mooriel, Magnus Spike and Rollerball, a gang who invented games to play amongst themselves. (Meltem John and Magnus Spike are plays on Elton John and Magnus Pyke.)
Gnoo Faces		1	25	A strip about "three screwball Gnoos, trying to break into showbiz!" The judging panel was made up of Mickie Musk (the skunk), Lionel Bear, Arthur Aardvark and Tony Scratch (the tiger). The name was a play on New Faces, a popular UK talent show at the time.
Gulp - The Galactic Goon with the GIGANTIC Gullet	Joe Austen	58	75	Back cover strip to complement Plug front cover, Gulp (Plug backwards) ate everything in the universe.
Hugh's Zoo	Gordon Bell	1	75	The adventures of Hugh and his backyard menagerie. Survived merger with the Beezer.
The Invasion of the Plug Bugs		26	75	A strip about a group of aliens
Jockey		44	75	
Lumpy Gibbon		1	25	Starred Lumpy Gibbon (a huge gibbon), Colonel Podgy Whiner (a hunter), Little Gibbon and Man Eating Tiger Moth. The title was a homage to the 1975 song "Funky Gibbon", by The Goodies
Luncheon Vulture		26	57	The adventures of a hungry vulture. The name echoes luncheon voucher
The Nutcase Bookcase - Guidebooks for Goons		19	75	Plug would star in a 'guide' to doing something, usually with disastrous results
Plug		1	75	Survived merger with the Beezer.
Sea Urchin		1	18	An amphibious boy who had underwater adventures with his friend Roger, the flying fish. The main antagonist of the strip was Silas Sharke, the underwater rotter
Supporting Life	Bill Ritchie	1	43	Starred Elvis, Plug's little brother, looking at a different football team each week. The first was Arsenal F.C.
Tony Jackpot	John Dallas	1	74	A boy obsessed with golf, whose name was a play on that of British golfer (and 1969 British Open winner), Tony Jacklin.
Violent Elizabeth		44	75	Her name was a play on Violet Elizabeth Bott, a well-known character from the Just William books by Richmal Crompton.

== See also ==
- List of DC Thomson publications
