= Yps (comics) =

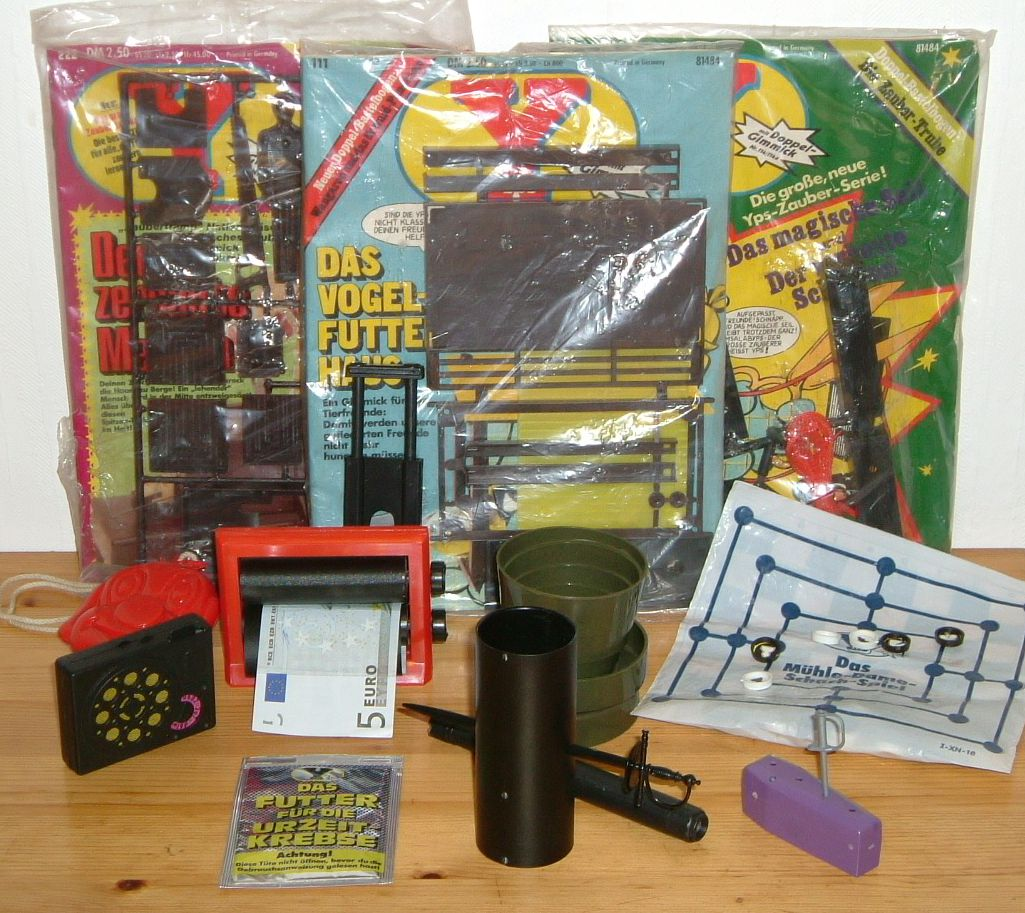
Some gimmicks from "YPS" comics

Yps is a German comic book magazine which ran for over 1,000 issues from 1975 to 2000. In 2005 and 2006 several prototype issues were published, but the series was not revived. Loosely based on the French Pif Gadget, Yps was highly popular due to the toy 'Gimmick' included with every issue.

== Relaunch and closure ==
On October 11, 2012 Yps was relaunched as a magazine for adults, targeting readers in the 30s age group, i.e. those who were kids when the original Yps was peaking. The magazine was closed again 2017.
