= Pif le chien =

French comic series

Publication information
- Publisher: L'Humanité
- Publication date: 1948

Creative team
- Written by: José Cabrero Arnal

Pif le chien is a comic strip character created in 1948 for the daily L'Humanité by José Cabrero Arnal. He had as his predecessor the character of Top by the same author, who was later identified as Pif's father. It is an anthropomorphic dog that forms an antagonistic/protagonist relationship with Hercules the cat. After L'Humanité, Pif became the star series of the children's newspaper Vaillant. In 1969, Vaillant was replaced by Pif Gadget. L'Humanité and the weekly L'Humanité Dimanche also published short stories of three or four boxes in each issue.

== Origins ==
Pif first appeared on March 26, 1948, in black and white, in the daily newspaper L'Humanité, then in its weekly supplement L'Humanité Dimanche. In its early days, Pif served mainly as a pretext for denouncing the injustices of his time: hunger or lack of housing. Pif knows his first adventures in color in Vaillant the most captivating newspaper in 1952: if Vaillant is published by a publishing house close to the PCF, the adventures of Pif are this time comic stories intended for youth, without obvious political content. It quickly became so successful that the newspaper changed its name to Vaillant le journal de Pif in 1965, then Pif Gadget in 1969. From the 1960s, Arnal, sick and tired (he never really recovered from his experience in deportation during the war), gradually abandoned the series to Roger Mas, who expanded the universe of Pif and created the character of Pifou, who would then have his own series.

Other authors will follow one another on the adventures of Pif and Hercules including, among the best known: Louis Cance, Carmen Levi (only woman to have drawn Pif), Yannick Hodbert, François Dimberton, Michel Motti, Claudio Onesti (Clod), François Corteggiani and Giorgio Cavazzano. The character is animated in a cinematographic advertising film for the newspaper L'Humanité and directed by Julien Pappé. On July 1, 2004, following the release of the new Pif Gadget, he returned under the drawing of Bernard Ciccolini and the script of Richard Médioni. In September 2005, Olivier Fiquet and François Corteggiani took over.

== Adaptation ==
- In 1989, "Pif le chien" was adapted as a 130-episode 13-minute animated television series and a feature film, The New Adventures of Pif and Hercules, in 1993.
