= Arthur le fantôme justicier =

Arthur

Publication information
- Publisher: Editiona Vaillant
- First appearance: Vaillant #451 (1954)
- Created by: Jean Cézard

In-story information
- Alter ego: ??
- Species: Ghost
- Abilities: Flight, selectively immaterial (can go through walls and objects at will)

Arthur le fantôme justicier ("Arthur the Ghost of Justice") was a French comic strip, created, written and drawn by Jean Cézard. It was first published in Vaillant #449 from December 20, 1953. The author drew the comic strip for the Pif Gadget magazine until he died in 1977.

The comic strip is about a ghost who fights crime and who can travel through time. It can be categorized as a humoristic comic strip.

The minimalism of the shapes was in strong contrast with the detailed and carefully consistent backgrounds and story. This is the first sketched comic strip of the author, and after it, he gave up on his realist artwork and created a few more comic strips: Les Rigolus et les Tristus, Surplouf le petit corsaire etc.

== Return to comics ==
Between 1982 and 1988, new adventures were published, by the artist Mircea Arapu.
