= André Chéret =

French comic book artist (1937–2020)

- Born: 27 June 1937; Paris, France
- Died: 5 March 2020 (aged 82); Île-de-France, France
- Occupation: Comic book artist

André Chéret (27 June 1937 – 5 March 2020) was a French comic book artist. He is best known for creating Rahan in 1969 alongside Roger Lécureux.

== Biography ==
Chéret was placed in the care of farmers in Allier during World War II. Passionate about drawing since his earliest childhood, André Chéret discovered comics through reading illustrated books such as Tarzan (in which are sometimes published strips signed by Burne Hogarth) and Fillette. He also read the jungle girl Durga Râni of René Pellos with his sisters.

In 1952, Chéret found a job in a printing house before working in cinematic advertising. During his military service in 1958 in Germany, he published his first comic strip, Nicéphore Dupont.

Chéret published his first comic book, Paulo et la furie du rodéo, on 24 May 1959. He published a comic strip in Cœurs Vaillants from 1959 to 1964. He also drew illustrations for the weekly magazine Radar and for the comic strip Rock l’invincible. From May 1962 until 1969, Chéret drew illustrations for Pif Gadget.

Chéret continued his work for Cœurs Vaillaints until 1968 with the comic Karl. In 1979, the first editions of the Michel Brazier comic were published in Spirou, but the rest of them remained unpublished until 2015.

=== Personal life ===
Chéret married Chantal Sauger in 1974, who illustrated many of his works. For over 30 years, the couple lived in La Ferté-Saint-Cyr, and Chéret once served as a municipal councillor. He created the logo for the local primary school, which was renamed after Rahan in April 2017. After Chantal's death in 2017, he moved to Île-de-France. André Chéret died on 5 March 2020 at the age of 82.

== Awards ==
- Prix de dessin of the Angoulême International Comics Festival (1976)
