= Roger Lécureux =

French comic book writer (1925–1999)

- Born: April 7, 1925; Paris, France
- Died: December 31, 1999 (aged 74); Itteville, France
- Notable work: Rahan; The Pioneers of Hope

Roger Lécureux (also spelled Lecureux; 7 April 1925 – 31 December 1999) was a French comic book writer.

== Biography ==
Lécureux was born in Paris. started off as an offset driver but was dismissed following disputes with his employer. He joined the team of the newspaper Vaillant, in charge of subscriptions, then gradually joined the team of screenwriters.

His most important works are The Pioneers of Hope made with Raymond Poïvet from 1945 to 1973 (he calls them the first comics of French science fiction), and Rahan, which he created in 1969 with André Chéret in the weekly Pif Gadget, from Éditions Vaillant. His goal was to create characters whose behavior was always collective.

He died in Itteville, France on 31 December 1999.
