= Raymond Poïvet =

French cartoonist

- Born: 17 June 1910; Le Cateau-Cambrésis, Paris
- Died: 29 August 1999 (aged 89); Nogent-le-Rotrou, Paris
- Education: Beaux-Arts de Paris
- Occupation: Cartoonist

Raymond Poïvet (17 June 1910 – 30 August 1999) was a French cartoonist.

== Biography ==
Poïvet was born in Le Cateau-Cambrésis, Nord. After studies at Beaux-Arts de Paris, he started in comics in 1941.

In 1945 he joined the communist French comics weekly magazine Vaillant, which was renamed Pif in 1969. He created the first and longest running French science-fiction comics: Les Pionniers de l'Espérance, which lasted until 1973. The scenarios were written by Roger Lecureux. Meanwhile, he also drew for other comics and feminine magazines: Colonel X in Coq hardi, Mam'zelle Nitouche in L'Humanité, and Guy Lebleu in Pilote.

Poïvet died on 30 August 1999 in Nogent-le-Rotrou.
