= Diary of an Awesome Friendly Kid: Rowley Jefferson's Journal =

Spin off book by Jeff Kinney

- Author: Jeff Kinney
- Illustrator: Jeff Kinney
- Language: English
- Series: Diary of a Wimpy Kid
- Genre: Children's novel; graphic novel; realistic fiction
- Publisher: Amulet Books (US); Puffin Books (UK)
- Publication date: April 9, 2019
- Publication place: United States
- Media type: Print (hardcover), print (paperback), Kindle, audiobook
- Pages: 217
- ISBN: 978-1419740275
- Website: Official website

Diary of an Awesome Friendly Kid: Rowley Jefferson's Journal is a spin-off of the Diary of a Wimpy Kid series by Jeff Kinney. Unlike the main-series books, which are written from the perspective of Greg Heffley, Diary of an Awesome Friendly Kid is written from the perspective of Greg's best friend, Rowley Jefferson, acting as Greg's biographer. The book was released on April 9, 2019. A sequel, titled Rowley Jefferson's Awesome Friendly Adventure was released on August 4, 2020, delayed from an initial release date of April 7, 2020. A third book in the spin-off series, titled Rowley Jefferson's Awesome Friendly Spooky Stories, was released on March 16, 2021.

== Plot ==
Rowley writes that he was inspired to get a diary because his best friend, Greg Heffley, owns one as well. After showing it to Greg, Rowley gets accused of copying him. Instead, Greg tells Rowley that his journal should be his biography, prompting Rowley to change the title to 'Diary of Greg Heffley by Greg Heffley's Best Friend Rowley Jefferson'. Rowley recounts how he and Greg first met, what he likes about Greg, memories of their friendship, and a blank list for Greg's future accomplishments.

Rowley then writes about the "good boy award" given to him by Greg, including other awards he received for doing Greg's chores. After Rowley complains that the awards are no longer special, Greg creates a point system for Rowley to do his chores. Rowley later laments that Greg is a poor study partner, recounting a time when Greg attempted to create a secret code to help them cheat on a math test; Rowley refuses to do so, and the two begin exchanging a paper of rude drawings, ending with them getting kicked out of the library.

The next entry is about "the time I made the worst mistake of my life". On a math test, Greg cheats by copying Rowley's entire test, even writing Rowley's name, and they both get in trouble, resulting in Greg being given three days of detention and having to retake the test, while Rowley is given a warning. Next, Rowley writes about a time when Greg had his back, hoping that Greg won't get mad at him for making him look bad; their class gets a new teacher, who is not bothered by the students acting crazy and not completing their work. Everyone in the class, including Rowley, gets a "C" grade, which makes Greg complain to the teacher that Rowley was the only one who did any classwork, causing the teacher to increase Rowley's grade to a "B".

In the penultimate entry, Greg and Rowley try to sneak out to bounce on a neighbor's trampoline during a sleepover, but Greg's parents catch them both and Susan divides his and Rowley's room in half. Greg draws an "invisible forcefield" that "zaps" Rowley if he tries to pass through it. Greg prevents Rowley from using the bathroom, and he pees out the window in the morning. The sleepover ends with Greg flushing one of Rowley's action figures down the toilet.

Rowley shows Greg his biography, and Greg is angry that it focuses on both him and Rowley instead of just him. Rowley suggests that it could be their biography, but Greg threatens to change all the parts with Rowley. Rowley changes the diary's focus back to himself. The book ends with Rowley's parents telling him he should find new friends, and Rowley responding that he can't because Greg takes up a lot of his time. Rowley believes that since Greg's mother says that friends get on each other's nerves, he and Greg must be "best friends" since they get on each other's nerves the most.

== Development ==
A shorter Wimpy Kid story from Rowley's point of view was written to celebrate World Book Day 2019. Kinney later developed it into a full-length book, becoming Rowley Jefferson's Journal, because he enjoyed writing it.

In an interview on the official Wimpy Kid YouTube channel, Kinney described that he noticed "the audience [...] always rooting for Rowley" in the Diary of a Wimpy Kid movies. This inspired him to write a novel from Rowley's point of view. On the subject of the book's illustrations, Kinney said that he liked how his art style is still recognizable even though Rowley "draws like a five year-old." He stated that he enjoyed writing the book and that it is his favorite book in the series, because he likes how Rowley is unable to keep the book's focus on Greg. When asked if the series would change to focus entirely on Rowley, Kinney confirmed that he will continue to write main-series books, but that he would also "really like to write more Rowley books," because "it's a lot of fun, and I think it's really fresh, and [Rowley] can write in lots of different styles about lots of different genres. So I'd really like to get to there, where Rowley is authoring lots of books." The following year, a follow-up to Rowley Jefferson's Journal, titled Rowley Jefferson's Awesome Friendly Adventure, was published. Rowley Jefferson's Awesome Friendly Spooky Stories, another sequel, was released in March 2021.

== See also ==
- List of media spin-offs
