= Spin-off (media) =

Narrative work derived from existing works

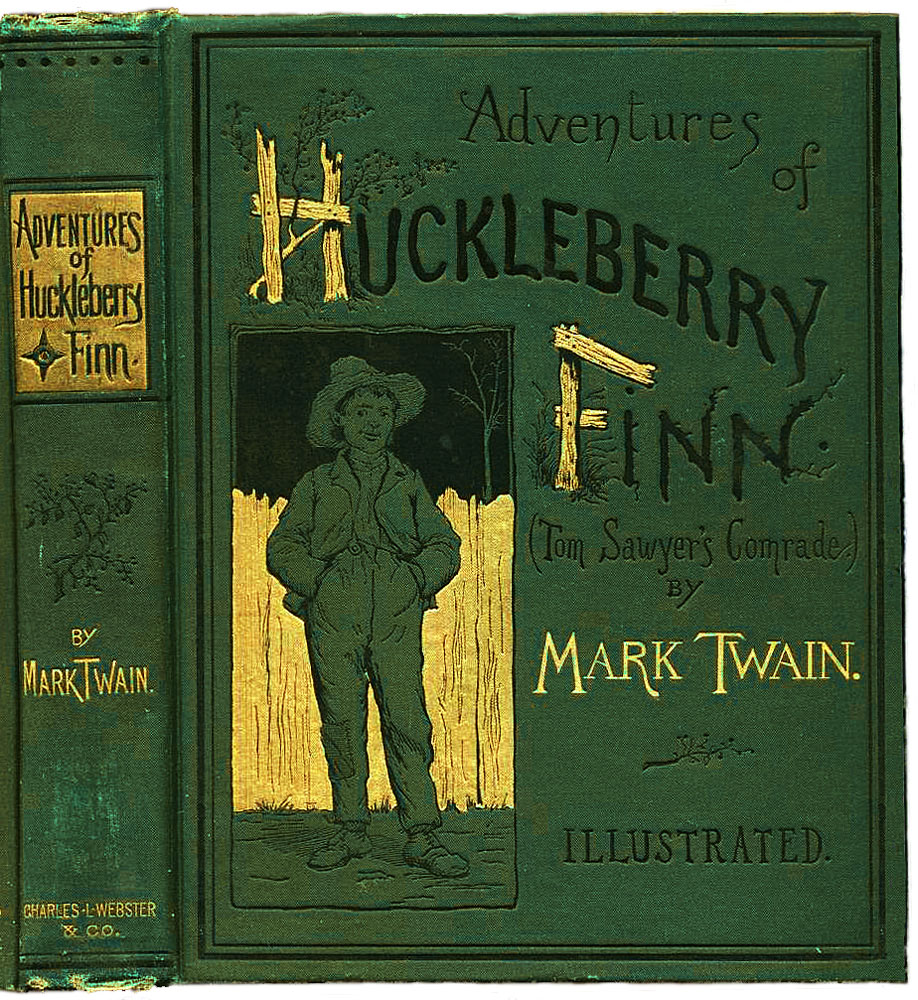
Cover of the Adventures of Huckleberry Finn book, a spin-off of The Adventures of Tom Sawyer

A spin-off or spinoff is any narrative work derived from an already existing work that focuses on different aspects from the original work.

== History ==
One of the earliest spin-offs of the modern media era, if not the first, happened in 1941 when the supporting character Throckmorton P. Gildersleeve from the old time radio comedy show Fibber McGee and Molly became the star of his own program The Great Gildersleeve (1941–1957).

== Description ==
A spin-off (also spelled spinoff) is derived from already existing works that focus on more details and different aspects from the original work (e.g. particular topics, characters or events), and includes books, comics, radio programs, television programs, animations, films, video games, or any narrative work in any medium.

In genre fiction, the term parallels its usage in television; it is usually meant to indicate a substantial change in narrative viewpoint and activity from that (previous) storyline based on the activities of the series' principal protagonist, and so is a shift to that action and overall narrative thread of some other protagonist, which now becomes the central or main thread (storyline) of the new subseries. The new protagonist generally appears first as a minor or supporting character in the main storyline within a given milieu and it is very common for the previous protagonist to have a supporting or cameo role, at the least as a historical mention, in the new subseries.

Spin-offs sometimes generate their own spin-offs, leaving the new show in its own series only vaguely connected to the original series; for example, the police procedural franchises of NCIS/JAG and CSI have both spun off multiple shows, including multiple spin-offs from series and spin-offs from spin-offs.

== Types and variations ==
=== Sidequels ===
A spin-off may be called a sidequel, a portmanteau of "side" (as in side-by-side) and "sequel", when it occurs in the same timeframe as the original, sometimes contacting with the main narrative at points. In Japanese, the word gaiden (外伝; pronounced [ɡaideɴ], lit. "outside legends") also refers to such contemporaneous spin-offs and is frequently translated as "side story".

=== Crossovers ===
Sometimes even when a show is not a spin-off of another, there will nevertheless be crossovers in which a character from one show makes an appearance on another. Sometimes crossovers are created in an attempt to provide closure to fans of another failed series. Sometimes show producers will reintroduce a character from an older series into a later one as a way of providing a connectivity of that particular producer's television "world".

== See also ==
- Canon (fiction)
- Digression
- Derivative work
- Expanded universe
- List of media spin-offs
- List of television spinoffs
- Parallel novel
- Robin Hood in popular culture
- Series fiction
- Spiritual successor
- Standalone film
