= Jonathan Tomines =

Canadian chiropodist

- Education: University of Waterloo; The Michener Institute
- Occupation: Chiropodist
- Known for: Social media presence
- Medical career
- Field: Podiatry
- Institutions: Mississauga Foot Clinic

YouTube information
- Channel: The Toe Bro
- Years active: 2017–present
- Genres: Medical procedures and education
- Subscribers: 1.84 million
- Views: 620 million
- Last updated: 23 April 2026
- Website: thetoebro.com

Jonathan B. Tomines, also known as The Toe Bro, is a Canadian chiropodist. Tomines works at Mississauga Foot Clinic, located in Mississauga, Ontario. He also has his own television documentary series, The Toe Bro, which aired for one season on A&E in 2019.

== Early life and education ==
Tomines attended the University of Waterloo, where he received his undergraduate degree in Biomedical Science. He then went on to receive his Graduate Advanced Diploma of Health Sciences specializing in Chiropody at the Michener Institute for Applied Health Sciences.

In his youth, Tomines often accompanied his father, also a chiropodist, to his office, sometimes providing basic help to the patients. Tomines now works in the same office in which his father worked for thirty years. His father is from the Philippines and his mother is from Germany.

Tomines cites the videos of dermatologist Sandra Lee as part of the inspiration for his YouTube videos and brand.

Tomines' certification of registration for chiropody was suspended from January 1 through May 30, 2025, due to professional misconduct; both his Instagram profile and all videos on his Youtube channel were subsequently set to private. Tomines stated that he would restore his online presence once his suspension ended; on June 28, 2025, he released an update video in which he details ongoing difficulties in resuming his practice and posting.
