= José Cabrero Arnal =

Spanish comic writer (1909–1982)

- Born: José Cabrero Arnal; September 6, 1909 Castilsabás, Huesca, Spain
- Died: September 7, 1982 (aged 73) Antibes, France
- Notable works: Pif le chien

José Cabrero Arnal or C. Arnal (September 6, 1909 – September 7, 1982) was a Spanish comics artist, who worked in France for most of his career but was never naturalized as French citizen. He is most famous for the comics series Pif le chien and Placid et Muzo.

== Biography ==
During his youth in Barcelona he worked as cabinetmaker and as repairman of calculators. He published his very first graphic works in magazines like Pocholo or the famous TBO, with a character called Top, a humanized dog that later became the famous Pif le chien.

In 1936, after the outbreak of the Spanish Civil War, he enrolled in the Republican militia and was forced into exile in France after the end of war. In 1940, while his adoptive country was under German occupation, he was captured and deported to the Mauthausen concentration camp, as were many other Republican exiles. He would not leave until the end of World War II in Europe, in 1945.

In 1946 he published the first cartoons of Placid et Muzo, an anthropomorphic fox and bear, in the weekly publication Vaillant, le journal de Pif. He was a frequent collaborator of L'Humanité, the newspaper of the French Communist Party. In this publication appeared for the first time in 1948 his most celebrated character, the dog Pif, and two years later he would draw Pif's inseparable partner, the cat Hercule, ending in the comic strip Pif et Hercule.

In 1949/50 José Cabrero Arnal published in Italian in the Italian magazine "Noi Ragazzi" various short stories in several episodes from issue no.7 of 1949 under no. 32 of 1950 in the magazine "Noi Ragazzi".

In 1955/62 José Cabrero Arnal published in Italian in the Italian magazine "Pioniere" various short stories in several episodes from issue no. 17 of 1955 under no. 19 of 1962 in the magazine "Pioniere".

In 1963/66 José Cabrero Arnal published in Italian in the Italian magazine " Pioniere dell’Unità " various short stories in several episodes from issue no. 1 of 1963 under no. 47 of 1966 in the magazine "Pioniere dell’Unità".

Pif gave name in 1969 to a magazine, Pif gadget, of great success during the 1970s, in which French and European cartoonists published their works, and which survived the death of its creator (with many cartoonists adopting Pif and Hercule into their own creations).
