= Jean Cézard =

French cartoonist and comic artist

Jean Cézard, or Jean Caesar, (born 23 March 1924 in Membrey, Haute-Saône, died 8 April 1977) was a French cartoonist and comic artist. He is best remembered for his comic strip Arthur le fantôme justicier.

He was a prolific writer and cartoonist in France during the post-war period, exercising both his talents in realism and in cartoonism, and remains popular due to his style of character creation using precise lines, detailed and well-rounded, and perfectly highlighted humor. His best known characters are Kiwi, Arthur the vigilante ghost, Rigolus and Tristus, and Surplouf the Pivateer. Cézard was also a wonderful artist whose nuanced and perfectly mastered art was largely unparalleled. In his time he did not hold the same level of fame as other artists, although they were certainly rivals. This suggests that he lacked a talented agency or marketing ability during this time.

== Biography ==
Cézard began his career in 1946 at Francs-Games, where after some illustration commissions, he directed the comedy series Mr. Toudou from 1948 on. He then created the Adventures of Pillul appearing in several publications of Editions SAETL (Selection daredevil, the Corsair and Texas Bill), then next the adventures of Professor Mirobolantes Pipe for the My Weekly Journal series.

From 1949 to 1954 he illustrated the Adventure Travel series and some other realistic comics such as: Brik and Yak, which was published in "Complete Stories" under the same name. From 1951 on, he worked for the Weekly Vaillant for which he produced several series: the Companions of the black section of the Quest, Aruda the Knight, and Lagardère Hero Land.

In 1953 he began Vaillant Pif Gadget which undoubtedly found great commercial success with the character Arthur the Vigilante Ghost, whom he illustrated until his death in 1977. In 1969 this minor character, who also travels well in time and in space, landed on an inhabited by strange alien red and green planet. Rigolus and Tristus was so successful that it became its own series until 1969. This series ended in 1973, when it turned to Surplouf the privateer.

At the same time, Cézard continued his work with Travel Adventures which he collaborate with Billy Jim Minimum Candy on to create three editions and a French novel in the Netherlands. He also created Editions of Kiwi 's character, a volatile calamitous character that always propelled his misadventures in prison or hospital in the last vignette of his stories. It was published from 1955 to 1968.

== Main Series ==
=== Realistic Series ===
- Brik
- Yak

=== Comedy Series ===
- Arthur the vigilante ghost
- Mr. Toudou
- Rigolus and Tristus
- Surplouf the privateer
- Father Passepasse
- Jim Low
- Billy Bonbon
