= Simply Smiffy =

Comic strip from The Beano

Simply Simffy
- Story from The Beano
- The masthead of the first issue, illustrated by Jerry Swaffield.

Publication information
- First issue: Issue 2254; (28 September 1985)
- Genre: Comic strip
- Story timeline: Issues 2254 – 2338, 3660 – ??
- Main character(s): Smiffy; Norman Smiffy

Story features in
- Beano works: The Beano Annual 1987, 1988; The Beano Summer Special 1986, 1987

Simply Smiffy is a comic strip published in the British comic magazine The Beano. It is one of the many spin-off comic strips off The Bash Street Kids, first appearing in issue 2254.

== Background ==
Simply Smiffy is the second Bash Street Kids spin-off that starred Smiffy, the first being Says Smiffy from 1971. It encouraged readers to mail the Beano office their ideas for new inventions, which are tested by Smiffy in the following issues. The series was illustrated by Jim Petrie and ran for over 25 issues.

== Synopsis ==
The stories are about Smiffy's life outside of going to school, usually making mistakes because of his ditziness. It is revealed he has a brother, a bespectacled boy (who looks similar to Smiffy) named Norman, who supervises Smiffy's antics.

== Publication history ==
Despite Jim Petrie illustrating Smiffy's previous comic strip, Simply Smiffy was illustrated by Jerry Swaffield. It was one of the first comic strips published and approved by chief editor Euan Kerr soon after Harry Cramond's retirement. The strips were a page long and were set in Smiffy's home, garden, or in parks or the high street. The series ran from issue 2254 to 2338.

=== Subsequent appearances ===
Simply Smiffy returned to The Beano in the Funsize Funnies, illustrated by Paul Palmer. It also appeared in 1987 and 1988's Beano annuals, and The Beano Summer Specials of 1986 and 1987.
