= Trauma: Life in the E.R. =

- Genre: Reality
- Country of origin: United States
- Original language: English
- No. of seasons: 7

Production
- Production company: NYT Television

Original release
- Network: TLC
- Release: February 20, 1997 – November 25, 2002

Trauma: Life in the E.R. is a medical-based television reality show that ran on TLC from 1997 to 2002 and reruns are currently airing on Discovery Life. At its peak, Trauma was one of TLC's top-rated shows and spawned two spin-offs, Paramedics and Code Blue. The series itself was nominated for seven Emmys.

== Show history ==
The show was produced by NYT Television (owned by The New York Times) and debuted in 1997. Like much of the medical-based programming on TLC (and Discovery Life as well), the show was designed as a "real-life" version of a popular American TV series. In this case, Trauma was designed to capitalize on the success of the NBC drama ER. The show follows the cases coming through Level One trauma centers and high-profile emergency rooms around the U.S. The first season consisted of several half-hour episodes, but by 1998, the series had expanded to a full hour, allowing for more time to follow cases as well as the lives of the doctors involved.

The show had no regular cast; every week featured a different hospital and a different group of doctors. Actor Michael McGlone narrated the series. Composer Chuck Hammer scored the series.

Most episodes centered on the physicians and nurses comprising the staff of a typical Level One trauma center, but occasionally a different type of staffer would be profiled to show their unique contributions to that specific hospital. For example, at Charity Hospital in New Orleans, Louisiana, the hospital's chaplain (a nun with the Sisters of Charity) was profiled in one episode, and another episode at Charity Hospital profiled the New Orleans paramedics, which was used as the pilot for the show Paramedics. Another episode followed a burn patient through his recovery at Vanderbilt University's medical center, allowing the show to profile the co-director of the burn center and one of the burn care technicians as a change of pace from the usual ER/Trauma cases.

First-run production ended in 2002, though the show lives on in reruns on Discovery Life. TLC stopped producing new episodes largely because the show was expensive and time-consuming to produce in comparison to other reality shows (each episode took 1–2 months to shoot and 3 months to edit, though several camera crews worked simultaneously at hospitals around the country and each hospital's shooting footage was usually split into two or three episodes). In addition, new medical privacy laws forbade recording patients before they (or their next-of-kin) gave permission. Since most patients were in the midst of a medical emergency, obtaining the necessary production releases became difficult or impossible. (Before the new law came into effect, Trauma's videographers would usually request permission after they had begun taping. If a patient refused permission, the cases would not be included in a program.)

The series was one of the first cinéma vérité style programs to be shot almost entirely on hand-held MiniDV camcorders by teams of videojournalists who were responsible for both the reporting and videography.

== Controversy ==
Trauma was one of TLC's most controversial shows from the beginning, because it did not sugar-coat or downplay the violent nature of the cases that usually ended up in a big-city trauma center. The show carries a warning at the beginning and on the opening frames of every return-from-commercial bumper: "Due to the graphic nature of this program, viewer discretion is advised". The warning is needed because the show does not shy away from letting the viewer see blood and gore, or even the death of patients. When the show debuted in 1997, such graphic presentations on television were quite rare.

Trauma was one of the first reality shows to deal with the controversial issue of health care professionals and blood-borne disease exposure. An episode set in San Antonio, Texas featured an E.R. intern who was stuck with a needle from suturing up a patient whose health history was completely unknown, including the extensive medical testing and anti-viral drugs the intern needed to take to ensure she did not contract any diseases from the patient. Another episode set in Nashville, Tennessee featured a trauma surgical resident who was accidentally stuck with a needle while treating a patient who had shot himself after discovering he had Hepatitis C; the surgical resident was found to be negative for Hepatitis C but still went through the months of anti-viral medications to ensure he did not later develop the disease.

Episodes shot for both Trauma and Code Blue in New Orleans, Louisiana featured Dr. Eduardo Marvez-Valls, coordinator of E.R. and Trauma Medical Residents at Charity Hospital. Marvez-Valls, whose reputation as a dedicated instructor and physician was often featured in interviews with the doctors featured in Trauma and Code Blue, was both openly homosexual (Code Blue frequently featured Marvez-Valls at his home in the French Quarter, which he shared with his longtime partner, Robert Ripley) and suffering from end-stage AIDS. Dr. Marvez-Valls did not perform tasks that would involve excessive exposure to needles, such as suturing or IV insertion, but he continued diagnosing and treating patients in the E.R. and Trauma services at Charity Hospital even after the hospital was shut down by Hurricane Katrina, practicing medicine in tents and other temporary emergency rooms until his death from AIDS-related kidney disease in 2006 at the age of 52.

Patient privacy concerns have dogged Trauma from the beginning. In the early 2000s, a group of patients from New Jersey who appeared on the show sued The New York Times Co. In response, one appeals court ruled that the format of the show technically qualified as news and that the series deserved the same protections under the law. Later, in 2005, two men in Florida whose cases were featured on the show sued the producers for breach of privacy, claiming show crew and producers would disguise themselves as hospital personnel to obtain release signatures for the taped footage under false pretenses. Charles Sims, an attorney for the show's producers, has dismissed the men's claims and asserted that all releases were obtained properly.

== Spin-offs ==
In its first spin-off, Paramedics followed the activities of teams of EMTs and paramedics in a number of large urban centers in the United States. The series lasted from 1998 to 2002. Its spirit lives on in the newer series Boston EMS, which has a similar premise. The second spin-off was Code Blue.

== Life after cancellation ==
When Trauma was canceled by TLC in 2002, NYT Television still had unused footage from a 3-month shooting session at Memorial Health Trauma Center in Savannah, Georgia. To make use of this footage, TLC agreed to renew Code Blue, a show originally conceived as a limited run series based on life at a single hospital, Charity Hospital in New Orleans, Louisiana. The new version of Code Blue, now named Code Blue: Savannah, consisted of eight episodes crafted out of the unused footage from the Trauma shoot at Memorial Health Trauma Center. This version of Code Blue has a different shooting style, a different narrator, and a different narrative tone, making it more closely resemble an episode of Trauma: Life in the E.R. rather than the mix of hospital life and New Orleans local color that made up the original Code Blue.

In December 2009, TLC aired a three-episode pilot for an emergency room reality show entitled "Emergency Level One". Focusing primarily on the doctors and surgeons, the show was produced by True Entertainment and filmed at Nashville Tennessee's Vanderbilt University Medical Center.

== Remastered episodes ==
Sometime in the 2010s, remastered versions of Trauma: Life in the E.R. began to air on Discovery Life. These remastered episodes had a different title, such as Vegas ER and Detroit ER. The episodes are no different than when they originally aired, with the only difference being that they are remastered and have a name inspired by the shooting location. These remastered episodes should not be confused with the similarly named NY ER, which is a different and more recent show. A few episodes coincidentally take place at a hospital that Trauma shot at, St. Vincent's ER in New York City, along with various other New York hospitals, and star famed television personality Dr. Oz.

== Mentions ==
The show was mentioned in the season 8, episode 8 of Untold Stories of the E.R. titled "Stuck in a Toilet". A receptionist is talking about a chest cracking that took place in an ER. The other receptionist asks when it happened, to which the other responds with, "last night on Trauma: Life in the ER".
