= Rahan (comics) =

French comics series

Rahan is a French comic series about an intelligent prehistoric man that first appeared as part of Pif gadget starting in March 1969 and was then published in albums of 2 to 4 complete stories. It was initially written by Roger Lecureux, and, after his death in 1999, by Lecureux's son. Rahan has over 100 stories and has lasted for 30 years.

The comics' illustrations are mainly drawn by André Chéret. Other artists who also contributed were Romero, Guy Zam (in French) and José de Huescar (in French). It has received a few adaptations over the years – notably adapted into a 2008 Italian-French animated television series, titled Rahan: Son of the Dark Age, produced by French animation studio Xilam Animation.

Another series by Lécureux, Tarao serves as a semi-sequel to the series.

== Publication history ==
The black edition of Rahan was edited by Soleil Prod in 1998, serving as the "complete edition" of the series.

== Premise ==
Rahan receives his necklace from his dying adoptive father. Illustration by André Chéret.

After the destruction of his tribe in a volcano eruption, Rahan moves from land to land while spreading goodwill among other humans. With his open altruism often at odds with his powerful will to survive, Rahan's ethic is encompassed by the qualities represented by the bear-claw necklace he received from his dying adoptive father, Crao: courage, loyalty, generosity, resilience and wisdom. After Rahan gets married, he receives a sixth claw, the claw of curiosity.

Rahan uses a variety of scientific methods to pick up bits of his knowledge (from nature) and spin it for a solution – for himself, for some human tribe, or even to help some animals in distress. He invents the catapult, the net, the fishing pole, and the lens. He diverts water for use in drinking and agriculture, flies on wings of leather, and uses concave mirrors to concentrate the rays of the sun to heat caves and fight rampaging animals. In stark contrast to any other primitive story, which is usually based around using stone as a major material, Rahan's adventure combines the positive social attitude of a true leader (being Rahan himself) with the inventive mind of a true scientist.

== In other media ==
In 1986, Rahan was adapted into an animated series by RMC Audiovisual, with a total of 26 episodes. Another animated series was made in 2008, developed as a children's animated series with many differences.

In 2003, a film adaptation was planned, directed by Christophe Gans and produced by Marc du Pontavice, starring Mark Dacascos in the titular role, but was cancelled, due to certain production problems and because du Pontavice's wife, Alix de Maistre, advised him to focus on the DNA of Xilam Animation, the slapstick comedy series.

=== TV series ===
Xilam Animation, France 3, Rai Fiction and Castelrosso Films produced a television series titled Rahan: Son of the Dark Age.

In a singular storyline, Rahan travels through a world after the dawn of humankind, with two tribes vying for control. He is accompanied by a sidekick named Ursus along his journey, While magic was repeatedly shown in the comics to be an ignorant misinterpretation of physical phenomena, the Shadow Queen (or "Queen of Darkness") is an actual magic user and the main antagonist of the series.

==== Cast ====
- Scott McShane as Rahan
- Billy West as Ursus, Drak and Agar
- Phil LaMarr as Enok, Crao and Mogo
- Jess Harnell as Sanga, Guna and Bakur
- Elizabeth Daily as the Shadow Queen and Tetya
- Jessica DiCicco as Noama
- William Calvert as Daro and Bog
