= The Bash Street Kids =

British comic strip series

- Characters from The Beano

Publication information
- Stars of: The Bash Street Kids [began as When the Bell Rings]
- Appear in: Pup Parade; Says Smiffy; Simply Smiffy; Queen Tootie; Where's Kevin?
- Author(s): Uncredited: Tommy Donbavand (2014-2016); Andy Fanton (2016 –)
- Illustrator(s): Leo Baxendale (1954 – 1962); David Sutherland (1962 – 2023); Shannon Gallant (2020 – )
- First appearance: Issue 604; (13 February 1954)
- Current status: Weekly
- Group timeline: Issues 604 – present

Characters
- Type of group: School friends in Bash Street School's Class 2B
- Members of group: Herbert "'Erbert" Hoover; Frederick "Freddy" Brown; Percival "Plug" Plugsley; Sidney Pye; Aristotle Smiffy; James "Scotty" Cameron; Kate "Toots" Pye; Wilfrid Wimble; Daniel "Danny" Morgan
- Enemies: Cuthbert Cringeworthy, Head, Teacher
- Other characters: Teddy, Ella, Jimmy, Gasbag, Janitor, Olive, Winston

Also appeared in
- The Beano: The Bash Street Kids Annual; The Beano Annual
- DC Thomson works: The Wizard; Plug

The Bash Street Kids is a comic strip in the British comic magazine The Beano. It also appeared briefly in The Wizard as series of prose stories in 1955. The strip, created by Leo Baxendale as When the Bell Rings!, first appeared in issue 604. It became The Bash Street Kids in 1956 and has become a regular feature, appearing in every issue. From 1962, until his death in 2023, David Sutherland drew over 3000 strips in his time as illustrator.

== History ==
Like many long-running UK comic strips, The Bash Street Kids is mostly frozen in the era when it began in 1954. It portrays Class 2B of the Bash Street School in Beanotown, where the teacher and headmaster wear gowns and the pupils sit at wooden desks with inkwells. They are taught by a stereotypical "Teacher", whose wife is "Mrs Teacher". The characters were inspired by the view from the D. C. Thomson & Co. office windows, overlooking the High School of Dundee playground. According to Leo Baxendale, "In fact, the catalyst for my creation of Bash Street was a Giles cartoon of January 1953: kids pouring out of school, heads flying off and sundry mayhems. Straight away, I pencilled a drawing of 'The Kids of Bash Street School' and posted it from my home in Preston to R. D. Low, the managing editor of D.C. Thomson's children's publications in Dundee. I received an offhand response, a dampener. It was only after I'd created Little Plum (April 1953) and Minnie the Minx (September 1953) that the Beano editor George Moonie travelled to Preston on 20 October 1953 and asked me to go ahead with Bash Street (he gave it the provisional title of 'When The Bell Goes'; when it appeared in The Beano in February 1954, it was titled 'When The Bell Rings')." Over time, the Bash Street School's large number of pupils slowly shrank to its trademark ten. When they first appeared, the strips consisted of the kids outside school; the settings were increasingly inside the school, and the strip was retitled The Bash Street Kids on 11 November 1956 with "the kids" preparing for a pantomime.

In 1994 (the Kids' 40th anniversary), it was announced that The Bash Street Kids would be overhauled to appeal to a more politically correct, modern audience. Changes included the replacement of Danny's trademark school hat by a top hat, Fatty becoming fit and muscular and Tom-boy Toots acting more feminine. The school would be replaced by a technologically advanced "academy", and Teacher by a robot. A protest began, accompanied by petitions and publicity stunts throughout Britain, demanding that the characters remain the same. The proposal turned out to be a hoax when the story introducing the new Bash Street Kids saw them in their old ways. Editor Euan Kerr was pleased with the fan response, saying that the publication "even got death threats!" Shortly afterwards, an animated adaptation was produced as a segment of The Beano Video Stars. By 2000 The Bash Street Kids was a feature-length strip, filling an entire Beano book. Often drawn by Mike Pearce and Kev F. Sutherland, during the late 2000s the strips moved to Beano sister publication BeanoMAX (where they were drawn by Nigel Parkinson). These feature-length strips were more detailed, delving into an obscure character's personality and introducing new traits. Spotty was revealed as sarcastic and aggressive, while Plug was a more sympathetic, emotional character. The strips detailed a rivalry between the kids and the comic's cover star, Dennis the Menace. Mike Pearce soon began penciling a spin-off from the original strip, The Bash Street Kids – Singled Out, a single-page comic concentrating on one "kid" a week. Pearce retired, the strips were taken over by Tom Paterson before being mothballed and they were later collected into two annuals.

In July 2013, coinciding with the 60th anniversary of the strip, a street in Dundee was renamed "Bash Street".

In May 2021, the character "Fatty" was renamed "Freddy", in an attempt to stop children using the name as an insult for overweight peers. The character "Spotty" was renamed "Scotty" in December 2021.

In June 2021, two new characters, Harsha and Mandi, were introduced to the strip. Harsha already appeared in another strip, Har Har's Joke Shop, which is about her family and the joke shop her father Hari "Har Har" Chandra owns. Mandi previously had her own occasional strip that dealt with mental health issues to promote the charity YoungMinds, and as such her main trait is that she worries about things.

The Bash Street Kids as of 2022

In June 2022, three more characters, Stevie, Khadija, and Mahira, were introduced to the strip. All three had their own strips prior to their addition. In addition, Cuthbert was given more of a spotlight from this point onwards, as he only showed up in the strip on different occasions throughout the year.

== Class 2B ==
The strip features Class 2B, which contains fifteen pupils.

=== Danny ===
Danny
- Character from The Beano

Publication information
- Star of: The Bash Street Kids
- First appearance: Issue 604; (13 February 1954)
- Author(s): Uncredited

In-universe information
- Full name: Daniel Deathshead Morgan, Danny Morgan(2023)
- Occupation: Student

Daniel Deathshead "Danny" Morgan, was the first identified member of the roguish members of Class 2B, first appearing in the comic strip's debut and becoming the leader after he gave each kid a wine gum. Danny often devises the kids' pranks and escape routes from school. Although he is clever he does poorly in school, primarily due to his laziness and short attention span. Danny is often described as having the "soul of a pirate", the reason he gets caught up in rebellious schemes and boisterous activities. Like most of the other characters he is usually rude to adults, once asking Smiffy to speak up because he couldn't hear him over Teacher. In later strips Danny has some respect for Teacher, often helping him out of trouble. Although he hates school, like the other children he found it hard to cope when the Bash Street School was closed. As the leader Danny is prone to conceit, and in the 2006 Beano annual he announces that his conker is indestructible in a competition. His swelled head is often deflated by a fellow student. In the present, Danny usually wears a skull and crossbones jumper and a floppy red school cap.

Danny seems especially close to Toots, calling her his second-in-command, and is most annoyed by Smiffy's stupidity and Spotty's sarcasm. He occasionally enjoys making fun of Plug's looks and Fatty's weight. Danny has an intense rivalry with Dennis the Menace, highlighted in a strip where the two compete to find a treasure under The O2 Arena and ending with Danny outwitting Dennis; they often argue in crossover strips. Although Danny also dislikes Roger the Dodger (although he is willing to use him) and Minnie the Minx, their rivalries are not as intense and he once had a crush on Minnie. He is a central character in The Beano Interactive DVD with Dennis, Gnasher, Minnie the Minx and Roger the Dodger.

=== 'Erbert ===
Herbert Hoover
- Character from The Beano

Publication information
- Star of: The Bash Street Kids
- First appearance: Issue 696; (19 November 1955)
- Appearance timeline: Issues 696 – present
- Author(s): Uncredited

In-universe information
- Full name: Herbert Henry Hoover
- Occupation: Student

Herbert Henry "'Erbert" Hoover is a short-sighted boy who struggles to see even with his spectacles, first appearing in issue 696. 'Erbert is considered the least-mischievous student, Beano Top Trumps – Erbert is least menacing of all Bash Street Kids and is said to resemble a human mole. Except for Cuthbert, the rest of the class have fun swapping his thick-rimmed glasses with others and seeing the resultant mayhem. In older strips, the character is sometimes called Herbert instead of 'Erbert. His short-sightedness is shared by his parents, who have ended up in different parts of town on many parents' evenings.

Feature-length strips and crossovers brand most of 'Erbert's mischief as accidental or the result of misdirection. During an escape, 'Erbert is usually bumping into a wall or running in the opposite direction. His short-sightedness is renowned; in The Beano Annual 2000 the characters take a cruise to Perth, only to reach shore at Perth, Scotland. When they go to the captain's quarters, they discover that 'Erbert has put himself in charge of the ship.

Although he is quiet and friendly, 'Erbert can wreak as much havoc as his classmates. He is a source of entertainment for the others; Sidney and Spotty once send him into a field full of cow pats, with misleading directions for getting out. Despite this, they consider him "one of the kids". When he moves to the Bash Street Academy 'Erbert receives contact lenses to improve his sight, discarding them when he returns to his old school.

His full name is a reference to former United States president Herbert Hoover.

=== Freddy ===
Frederick Brown
- Character from The Beano

Publication information
- Star of: The Bash Street Kids
- First appearance: Issue 607; (6 March 1954)
- Appearance timeline: Issues 607 – present
- Author(s): Uncredited

In-universe information
- Occupation: Student

Frederick Joseph "Freddy" Brown first appeared in issue 607. He is a large, round boy who is always eating, only in later strips is he ridiculed for his weight; he usually reacts by trying to prove the others wrong, but earlier he is indifferent. When Danny tricks Freddy into completing a long assault course to prove his fitness, he breaks the equipment. Although he is usually the only student able to eat school cook Olive's meals without incident, in the 2009 annual her curry makes him ill. Freddy has several stories about him in the Beano Library series. In the academy makeover, he has slimmed down, but regains his former girth after being freed from brainwashing.

Originally, Freddy was named "Fatty", but he was renamed in 2021 to prevent the old name from being used to taunt overweight children.

=== Plug ===
Percival Plugsley
- Character from The Beano

Publication information
- Star of: The Bash Street Kids
- First appearance: Issue 606; (27 February 1954)
- Appearance timeline: Issues 606 – present
- Author(s): Uncredited

In-universe information
- Full name: Percival Proudfoot Plugsley / Plugseley
- Occupation: Student

Also appeared in
- DC Thomson works: Plug

Percival Proudfoot "Plug" Plugsley first appeared in issue 606. He is a lanky, gangling character with a large overbite, protruding ears, two buck teeth and a wide nose. On the cover of Plug his name is given as Percival Proudfoot Plugsey, although in some earlier strips he is named Claude. Plug's real name is only occasionally used in The Beano, such as in Singled Out when Teacher addresses him by his full name. He is originally known as Pug; according to The Beano, the "l" was added when Smiffy had one to spare after misspelling "silly".

Despite, or perhaps because of his appearance Plug is one of the more sympathetic Bash Street Kids, often ready to defend those he feels have been unjustly treated; he once calms Danny down after he loses patience with Smiffy's stupidity. He has on one occasion fainted from seeing his own reflection (after polishing the handles of Teacher's bicycle), and considers himself the most handsome boy in Beanotown.

Plug had his own comic from 1977 to 1979 featuring him and his two pets (Pug from Pup Parade and Chunkee the Monkey), and was the first Beano character with a spin-off. Plug was later incorporated into The Beezer.

He has two sisters, Plugella and Plugena, who closely resemble him. However, in earlier strips his father was shown to be quite handsome (to the confusion of the other kids) and Plug is described as taking after his mother in appearance. In the September 2014 issue of The Beano he is described as Jonah's nephew, implying that he is the son of Jonah's sister Jinx.

With Kev F. Sutherland, Plug had a more dominant role and was frequently a story's main character. In one he has a girlfriend, making him the first Beano character (except for Walter) to do so.

Although Plug received plastic surgery for the Bash Street Academy makeover, he soon returned to his familiar appearance. When he sees his friends brainwashed into behaving, he saves them by installing a virus on the robot teacher's disc drive.

=== Toots ===
Toots Pye
- Character from The Beano

Publication information
- Star of: The Bash Street Kids; Queen Toots
- First appearance: Issue 604; (13 February 1954)
- Appearance timeline: Issues 604 – present
- Author(s): Uncredited

In-universe information
- Occupation: Student

Toots Pye (first generation)
- Full name: Kate Pye, Sydney Kate Pye

Toots Pye (second generation)
- Full name: Sydney Pye

Toots Pye /ˈtʊts/, whose real name is Sydney Kate Pye, was until May 2021 the only girl in Class 2B. Although she is a tomboy, she does have some feminine interests. One of her biggest interests is football, and has been shown to be better than all of the boys in her class at it, even when she is against all of them. She is also a fan of boy bands and has admitted a crush on Dennis the Menace, sending him a valentine. Although most of the kids dislike Dennis, her friendship with Minnie the Minx is also surprising and she is the only kid to show any warmth to either character.

Surprisingly tough and as bossy as Danny, Toots is the gang's second-in-command and takes charge in Danny's absence. Her bossiness is exemplified in the feature-length Queen Toots, where she discovers she is connected to royalty. When Toots takes advantage of her power, Dennis announces that she cannot boss him around and she puts him in a makeshift prison tower (quickly populated by other Beano characters and the rest of the kids). She loves music, often pulling a "boogie box" (a CD player) behind her or listening to her headphones instead of Teacher.

Although Toots enjoys the boys' company, she sometimes exhibits disdain, naivete or exasperation at their more boyish behaviour. In the academy makeover, she wears a frilly dress and her hair and face are made up.

=== Sidney ===
Sidney Pye
- Character from The Beano

Publication information
- First appearance: Issue 622; (22 May 1954)
- Author(s): Uncredited

In-universe information
- Full name: Sidney Mason Pye, Sidney Pye (2023)

Sidney Mason Pye is Toots' younger twin brother by three minutes, first appearing in issue 622. His spiked haircut resembles a chimney-sweeping brush. He is a trickster, with Smiffy a frequent target. When the kids rehearse a nativity play, Smiffy asks what sound a sheep makes. Sidney replies "Woof", and he and Wilfrid go into hysterics when Smiffy ruins the rehearsal. He makes pithy remarks about the other kids, to the amusement of those around him; he and Spotty fight several times when the latter is a target.

Sidney loves animals and has a wide variety of pets, from elephants to mice. His mouse is often part of the kids' plans. During the academy makeover, his chimney-brush hair is shaved off and he is apparently hypnotised.

=== Smiffy ===
Smiffy
- Character from The Beano

Publication information
- First appearance: Issue 613; (17 April 1954)
- Author(s): Uncredited

In-universe information
- Full name: Aristotle Smith
- Occupation: Student

Aristotle John Smiffy first appeared in issue 613, and is portrayed as a jovial scatterbrain. When Teacher calls the roll, instead of saying "Present, sir" he says "Gift, miss". Although he is sometimes very kind and intuitive (similar to an idiot savant), most of the time he cannot remember what colour the sky is. In his brief involvement in The Wizard, he is given the name John Smith. Smiffy has appeared in two spin-off strips: the 1971–72 Says Smiffy and the 1985–87 Simply Smiffy (where he appears with his brother, Normal Norman). In 2008 he acquires a pet pebble, Kevin, who has his own feature (Where's Kevin?) in The Beano number 3604. First appearing in a 2008 Singled Out story, Kevin appears in Bash Street Kids stories in 2010 and 2011. In the academy makeover Smiffy has a new brain installed, making him the brightest of the kids.

=== Scotty ===
James Cameron
- Character from The Beano

Publication information
- Star of: The Bash Street Kids
- First appearance: Issue 908; (12 December 1959)
- Appearance timeline: Issues 908 – present
- Author(s): Uncredited

In-universe information
- Full name: James Scott Cameron
- Occupation: Student

James Scott Cameron (formerly nicknamed Spotty, now nicknamed Scotty) is a short boy who wears a blue collared jersey and an extremely long, striped tie. He is proud and protective of the 976 black spots covering his face, fending off any attempts to remove them. Teacher sees him as the mouthiest of the kids; in Singled Out and feature-length strips, he interrupts the lessons with comments. Scotty is sarcastic, conceited and protective about his masculinity and height. Like Danny he dislikes Dennis the Menace, especially after Dennis menaces him during the latter's 50th-birthday party. In the academy makeover, Scotty's spots and aggressive, sarcastic nature are gone. In late 2021 Scotty declared that he was tired of being defined solely by his spots, leading the other kids to help him choose the new nickname Scotty, taken from his middle name Scott.

=== Wilfrid ===
Wilfrid
- Character from The Beano

Publication information
- First appearance: Issue 618; (22 May 1954)
- Appearance timeline: Issues 618 – present
- Author(s): Uncredited

In-universe information
- Full name: Wilfrid John Wimble, Wilfrid Bramble (2023)
- Occupation: Student

Wilfrid Wimble is the smallest and quietest of the Bash Street Kids, and has social anxiety, his thoughts hidden behind a green jumper going up to his nose. He loves turtles, and resembles a tortoise; his neck is never seen, because when he removes his jumper his vest is just as high.

He is often simply present in the stories, speaking only occasionally. Unlike 'Erbert, most of Wilfrid's mischief is intentional. He hangs around most often with Spotty and 'Erbert and, occasionally, Sidney. In the academy storyline Wilfrid apparently has a large chin under his jersey, but it is prosthetic and he pulls it off.

=== Cuthbert ===
Cuthbert Cringeworthy
- Character from The Beano

Publication information
- First appearance: Issue 1550; (1 April 1972)
- Appearance timeline: Issues 1550 – present
- Author(s): Uncredited

In-universe information
- Full name: Cuthbert Jason Cringeworthy, Cuthbert Creeply Cringeworthy (2023)

Cuthbert Jason Cringeworthy, the brightest student in the class, is a teacher's pet and has a name for every letter of the alphabet. First appearing in 1972, he resembles a miniature Teacher (a play on the D. C. Thomson comic tradition that pets resemble their owners, like Dennis the Menace and Gnasher) and Walter the Softy from Dennis the Menace. The first thing Danny said about Cuthbert was, "He reminds me of someone I don't particularly like". His character has evolved slightly; although he still swots and is as bright as ever, particularly in longer strips by Mike Pearse and Kev F. Sutherland he is one of the gang (unlike earlier strips, where he seemed to dislike the other kids) and sometimes comes up with intelligent ideas to help their cause or save the school. Cuthbert wants to be like the other kids, but although he is liked he did not quite fit in, but this has now changed, for example Cuthbert recently devised a clever scheme to get the other kids out of class detention, so he could have fun with them all at the local playground after school. Cuthbert is the only kid who wears the school uniform and turns in homework. A school-dance strip hints at a crush on Toots, but she quickly rejects him.

=== Harsha ===
Harsha Chandra, a British girl of Indian descent, joined Class 2B in June 2021. She already appeared in another strip, Har Har's Joke Shop, which is about her family and the joke shop her father Hari "Har Har" Chandra owns. She's a prankster similar to Tricky Dicky.

=== Mandi ===
Mandi, full name Mandira Sharma, another British girl of Indian descent, also joined Class 2B in June 2021. She previously had her own occasional strip that dealt with mental health issues to promote a charity, and as such her main trait is that she worries about things.

=== Stevie ===
Steven "Super Star" Starr joined Class 2B in Wednesday 8 June 2022. He has his own strip of the same name. He wants to be famous. He is a black British boy, who is part American, as his Dad's side of the family is from there.

=== Khadija ===
Khadija Raad, or Sketch Khad, joined Class 2B in Wednesday 8 June 2022. She is a Muslim and likes to draw on her Sketch pad, with any thing drawn on it coming to life.

=== Mahira ===
Mahira Salim, a British girl of Pakistani descent, joined Class 2B in Wednesday 8 June 2022. She has her own strip called Mahira of the Match. She likes football and is often regarded somewhat as a female version of Ball Boy.

== Other characters ==
Teacher (Algernon Cringeworthy, Walter Winterbottom)
Class 2B's long-suffering teacher, merely called "Teacher". In a 1970s Beano Summer Special, his name was given as Algernon John Cringeworthy. The name Algernon was again referenced in the 1988 book Dandy Beano: 50 Golden Years. However, in The Wizard no 1527 (21 May 1955) he is referred to as Sleepy Sam Snorer. Teacher use to wear a mortarboard and has a domineering wife, known as Mrs Teacher. He drives an old crank-starter car, often used by the kids in their exploits.
Headmaster (Headward Headington-Hail, Chocolious Biccius, Mr. Headington)
The pompous, portly school headmaster. Fond of tea and biscuits, he always wears an academic gown and mortarboard. Teacher spends much of his time toadying to Head, and usually addresses him as "Your Headship". In the 2015 Beano Annual, Head has retired to play golf.
Janitor (Fittock Con, Ralf Chustace)
The school's fat, lazy caretaker, who hates litter and students who break the rules and enjoys bossing Winston the cat around. In the 2017 TV series, Dennis & Gnasher: Unleashed!, his first name is revealed to be Ralph.
Winston
The school's cat. Anthropomorphic, he often mops the floor with Janitor and wears a similar hat. Although Winston is sometimes shown as the real force behind the school's upkeep, he is often overshadowed by Janitor. Crafty, he often concocts his own schemes when Janitor frustrates him. Winston has his own strip drawn by Paul Palmer, which began in Funsize Funnies issue #3660.
Olive Sprat
The school cook (and Beano office tea lady), who first appeared in the strip in 1981. Although she is kind, her food is terrible; it often looks like it is still alive, and her tea can burn holes through walls. Olive thinks she is a good cook and sees no reason to change her methods, a constant source of worry to the school's pupils and staff. Large boxes of indigestion remedy are occasionally seen on the canteen tables, and Freddy is often the only pupil who will consider eating her lunches.
Mrs Teacher (Arabella Cringeworthy)
Teacher's overbearing wife, who looks like him (complete with moustache). She is assertive, bossing Teacher around while at home and yelling at the kids as a supply teacher. In another story, she injures the students in a break-dancing competition because they injured her husband.
Techno
A science teacher who appears during the mid-1990s and is an Inspector Gadget-type robot. Techno had his own limited-run strip, appeared in The Beano Book of Amazing Facts and returns in the 2008 Bash Street Kids Annual.
Wayne
An eleventh pupil named Wayne was introduced after a competition on the BBC's Blue Peter to create a new Bash Street Kid. The winning entry was announced on 14 March 2007 as "Wayne's in pain". Wayne has fat, puffy cheeks, dandelion-like hair, a problem with standing and is talkative. He wears a plaster cast and sling, and suffers comic misfortunes like Calamity James. After a year, Wayne disappeared from the strip without any explanation.
The Blob Street Kids
A group of children from a nearby school who became rivals of the Bash Street Kids. Each member of the Bash Street Kids has a counterpart in the Blob Street Kids, and a similar rivalry appears in The Bash Street Pups.
The Posh Street Kids
A group of rival children from a posh school.

Some characters (Teacher and Head, for example) are named after their occupations. The children's parents (who look almost exactly like their children) are called Plug's Dad and so on, even in flashbacks to their childhoods.

In the early years, there were an indeterminate number of students; one page had 28, including:

- Teddy – A stereotypical Teddy Boy, appearing primarily during the 1950s
- Ella – Another girl
- Jimmy – A boy resembling Smiffy, who wears a cap
- Gasbag Jones – A curly-haired boy

The characters appeared in one-page stories (not comic strips) entitled "Bash St. School" in The Wizard in 1955, and were the full-page cover cartoon on 23 July 1955.

== Artists ==
Leo Baxendale drew the strip until 1962, when David Sutherland replaced him. Sutherland originally used a similar drawing style to Baxendale's, simplifying it later in the decade. He has drawn most of the strips since then, except from 1998 to 2000 (when Nigel Parkinson took over the strip in a style similar to that of David Parkins in Dennis the Menace.) The strips have had a closely connected visual style since the early 1970s, when Sutherland began drawing them both. Although he was apparently easing into semi-retirement, Parkinson moved to Dennis the Menace in 2000 and Sutherland returned. Sutherland continued drawing the strip until he died in 2023, at the age of 89.

The strip has had a number of ghost artists, including Gordon Bell during the early 1970s, John Sherwood later in the decade, Keith Reynolds during the 1980s and Tom Paterson in the early 1990s. Mike Pearse and Kev F. Sutherland (no relation to David Sutherland) have occasionally drawn the strip, long stories in particular. Following Sutherland's death, Shannon Gallant and Mychailo Kazybrid both acted as temporary artists in the following months, before Gallant was appointed as Sutherland's permanent replacement.

== Spin-offs and other appearances ==
The Bash Street Kids has had a number of spin-offs, including Pup Parade, Simply Smiffy, Plug and Singled Out. The Bash Street Kids Annual, previously known as The Bash Street Kids Book and published biannually, is published in August. Summer specials, with solo stories of each character, were also published during the 1990s and were a forerunner to Singled Out. Most were drawn by Tom Paterson, who later drew the Singled Out strip. From 1968 to 1972 The Beano ran a similar series, The Belles of St. Lemons.

The Dandy has had two similar series: the 1970s Whacko (about a teacher who taught in a suit of armour because of his unruly pupils) and P5 from 1998 to 2000, also about a class and their long-suffering teacher. P5 was republished in 2006 as Class Act.

=== Singled Out ===
Singled Out (comics)
- Story from The Beano

Publication information
- First issue: Issue 3226; (15 May 2004)
- Last issue: Issue [n/a]; (circa 2009)
- Genre: Comic strip
- Story timeline: Issues 3226 – [n/a]

Story features in
- Beano works: The Beano Annual 2009, 2010

Singled Out was a spin-off comic strip in the UK comic The Beano. Based on The Bash Street Kids, Singled Out focuses on one character each week and builds a one-page story around them. It first appeared in issue 3226, dated 15 May 2004, drawn by Mike Pearse. Mike Pearse has also included other Beano faces in his strips such as Dennis the Menace, Bea and The Three Bears.

Pearse drew the strip until mid-2007, when the job was given to Nigel Parkinson, and then Tom Paterson. David Sutherland also drew a single strip. Paterson's trademark background images, such as the randomly positioned socks, are often included. The bottom left-hand corner of the page no longer shows which character the strip is focused on. Some strips mentioned which character was being featured in the header, but others didn't provide any information on this. After the 2009 Bash Street Kids annual (Space Cadets) was published, Paterson's work on Singled Out was changed to be more like Pearse's style, where before it was akin to David Sutherland's style, while Nigel Parkinson drew it in the Beano's sister comic, BeanoMAX. Several of the early Mike Pearse stories were reprinted in the 2010 Bash Street Kids annual. The strip appeared on an increasingly less regular basis in 2009, and has since ended. There was a Singled Out reprint strip shown a few years later (under the title Bash Street Capers), but this was (quite oddly as it was labelled No.1) a one-off.

== In other media ==
Title	Directed by	Written by	Bash Street Kids portrayed by
The Beano Video (1993, ITV) The Beano Videostars (1994, ITV)	Derek Mogford Terry Ward	Richard Everett; Terry Ward	Susan Sheridan (Danny, 'Erbert, Fatty, Toots and Wilfrid); Jonathan Kydd (Plug, Sidney, Smiffy and Spotty) Susan Sheridan (Danny, Sidney, Smiffy and Toots); Enn Reitel ('Erbert, Fatty, Spotty and Wilfrid); Jonathan Kydd (Plug)

=== Video ===
The Bash Street Kids appear in 1993's The Beano Video and 1994's The Beano Videostars; they also appear singing two songs: "The Beano Rap" and "We're the Kids From Bash Street School".

=== Theme parks ===
Before Beanoland became Wild Asia at the Chessington World of Adventures, it included the Bash Street Bus. The kids were also featured in the water-balloon portion of the park, and their standees were posted at a number of locations.

=== Video games ===
Plug is a playable character in Beanotown Racing for the PC, and the school is a race track.

=== Toys and games ===
Robert Harrop has designed figures, statues and ornaments based on The Bash Street Kids. A target-practice game featured the characters, and a McDonald's Happy Meal toy set included a number of the kids.
