= Pup Parade =

British comic strip

The Bash Street Dogs
- Characters from The Beano
- The Bash Street pups, illustrated by Lew Stringer.

Publication information
- Stars of: Pup Parade (1967–1989, 2003, 2011, 2020)
- Author(s): Uncredited
- Illustrator(s): Gordon Bell; Nigel Parkinson; Lew Stringer
- First appearance: Issue 1326; (16 January 1967)
- Last appearance: Issue 4030 (8 April 2020)
- Group timeline: Issues 1326 – 2401, 3162 – 3204, 3660 – ??, ?? – 4024, 4030

Characters
- Type of group: Friends and neighbours
- Members of group: Bones, Blotty, Enry, Manfrid, Peeps, Pug, Sniffy, Tubby, Wiggy
- Allies: The Bash Street Kids
- Enemies: Fusso, Spots, Lash, Thiky, Piggy, Baldy, Soffo, Proudon, Markus

Also appeared in
- The Beano: The Beano Annual 1970–??, 2012; The Beano Summer Special 1968–1988; Beano Comic Library (issue 66)
- DC Thomson works: The Topper (issue 1876–end); The Beezer and Topper (issue #1 – year 1992)

Pup Parade is a British comic strip that features in the comic magazine The Beano. It is a spin-off to The Bash Street Kids, following the lives of their dogs, and appeared in several issues for over two decades. The comic strip has been rebooted frequently, from the comic magazine it debuted in, to other comic magazines created and owned by DC Thomson.

== Synopsis ==
The Bash Street Kids' anthropomorphic dogs live in an alleyway and have many misadventures. They look for food, play games with each other and their owners, and meet other animals.

== Publication history ==
=== Original run ===
Pup Parade made its first appearance in issue 1326, illustrated by Gordon Bell. The original run finished in issue 2401. The strip returned with a new series from issue 3162 to 3204.

From June 2011, reprints appeared in The Beano, subsequently replaced by new stories, illustrated by Nigel Parkinson. Short strips featured in Funsize Funnies, but Lew Stringer became the new author and illustrator after 2014.

=== Subsequent appearances ===
==== The Beano ====
As of September 2021, the comic strip's last appearance in The Beano was issue 4030, but Pup Parade has appeared in other part of the Beano franchise.

The Pup Parade also made a return in the Bash Street Kids Annual 2008. They appeared again in a talent contest in the 2012 Beano Annual, which Sniffy won. This strip was titled as The Bash Street Dogs and was drawn by Nigel Parkinson.

==== DC Thomson ====
They then moved to The Topper in January 1989, still drawn by Bell which they stayed for the rest of the comic's life, surviving the merge with The Beezer and stayed on with the newly renamed comic Beezer and Topper until 1992.

== Characters ==
The pups were:

- Bones – Danny Morgan's dog. The leader.
- Blotty – Spotty's dog. The one with many spots. This dog was originally called "Spotty", before its change in the mid-1970s. In the late 1980s he reverted to his original name, and his final name originated in 2003.
- 'Enry – 'Erbert's dog. The shortsighted one.
- Manfrid – Wilfrid's dog. The one with a collar up to his chin.
- Peeps – Toots' dog. The girl (who wears a bow.)
- Pug – Plug's dog. The ugly one.
- Sniffy – Smiffy's dog. The stupid one. Got the most stories along with Bones.
- Tubby – Fatty's dog. The fat one.
- Wiggy – Sidney's dog. The one with strong hair.

Their sworn enemies are dubbed the Blob Street Dogs:

- Fusso – Bones' rival. The leader and the fussy one.
- Spots – Blotty's rival, and his cousin.
- Lash – Peeps' rival. The girl.
- Thiky – Sniffy's rival. The stupid one.
- Piggy – Tubby's rival. The fat one.
- Baldy – Wiggy's rival. The bald one.
- Soffo – The soft one.
- Proudon – The big-headed one.
- Markus – Proudon's brother. Like his sibling, very big-headed.

Cuthbert Cringeworthy has a King Charles Spaniel called Cringley, but he rarely features in the strip.

Other sparring partners were the Bash Street Cats, who appeared in a summer special and in the Beano Book 1972. The Bash Street Kids also owned fish in the same issue.

Continuing the kids' anthropomorphosis into nature, the Bash Street Birds completed the set. They appeared in at least one annual and made fleeting appearances elsewhere.
