= Pif Gadget =

French children's magazine (1969–1993, 2004-2009)

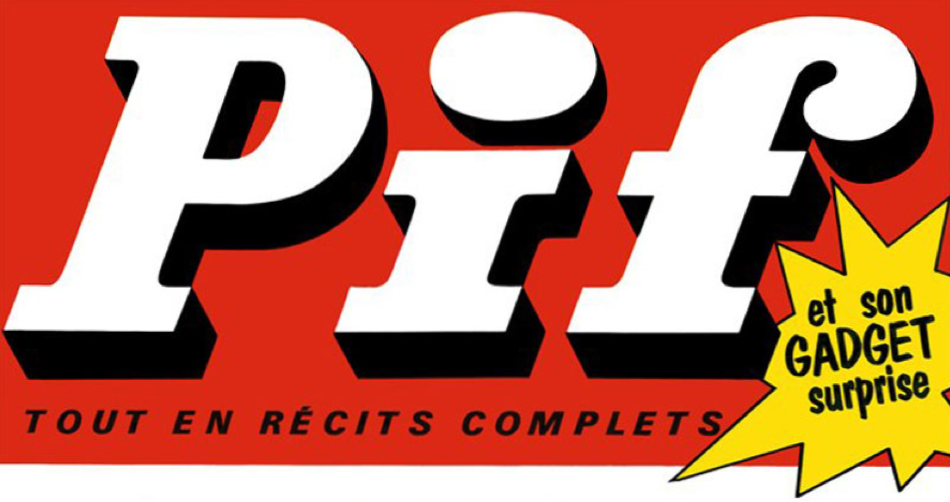
Pif Gadget

Pif Gadget (also simply known as Pif) was a French comics magazine for children that ran from 1969 to 1993 and 2004 to 2009. Its readership peaked in the early 1970s.

== Predecessors ==
Pif has its origins in Le Jeune Patriote, a youth magazine published by French Communists during the German occupation of France during World War II. It was published illegally from January 1942 but became legal from 1944. In 1945 it was renamed Vaillant, Le Jeune Patriote. In 1946 its title was shortened to Vaillant, with the tag, "le journal le plus captivant" (The Most Captivating Magazine). For the April issue of 1965, the title was changed to Vaillant, le journal de Pif, due to the popularity of its character Pif, a dog character created by José Cabrero Arnal. Until 1969, Vaillant had, like its competitors, serialized some stories over several issues, but the magazine in this incarnation ended with issue number 1238 on February 23, 1969.

== Publication history ==
Pif Gadget started again as a weekly magazine with issue number 1, released on February 24, 1969, but retained the old number relative to Vaillant. The magazine was called Pif et son gadget surprise for the first few months. The gadget was a "free gift" toy with each issue, including Pifises (brine shrimp in stasis, which readers could raise as minuscule pets - known in English as sea monkeys).

The cover of Pif Gadget had the strapline Tout en récits complets (all in complete stories) indicating that none of the comic strips were serialized over multiple issues. However, this reference disappeared in December 1973 with the number 250 and the appearance of the first serialized stories, taking up the model of its competitors.

Its featured comics included:

- Rahan
- Doc Justice
- Hugo Pratt's Corto Maltese
- Marcel Gotlib's Gai-Luron
- Nikita Mandryka's Les Aventures potagères du Concombre masqué
- Raymond Poïvet and Roger Lecureux's Les Pionniers de l'Espérance
- Le Grêlé 7/13
- Nasdine Hodja
- Jean Cézard's Arthur le fantôme justicier
- Les Rigolus et les Tristus
- Jean Tabary's Totoche and its spin-off Corinne et Jeannot
- Dicentim le petit Franc

Documentary filmmaker Fredric Lean created a series based on 'Docteur Justice' for French TV network M6.

Pif Gadget's record print run was one million copies, first on April 6, 1970, and again in September 1971. This set a record for a European comic strip that still stands. The paper also benefited from being able to reach the newly industrialized countries, and was one of the select few Western magazines allowed to be sold behind the Iron Curtain due to its left-wing credentials. It went into rapid decline at the same time as the Soviet Union faded, with content thinning and stories extended over several issues. Its last major feature was during the bicentennial of the French Revolution in 1989. The original version was last printed in February 1993.

Pif Gadget was revived as a monthly magazine in July 2004 under the aegis of Pif Editions, with runs of approximately 100,000 units. Saddled with about 4 million euros of debt, the 6-person company went into receivership (redressement judiciaire) in March 2007 and was wound up (liquidation judiciaire) on January 15, 2009. The last issue was published in November 2008.

It has been relaunched in 2015 as a quarterly named "Super Pif".

== Similar comics ==
Pif inspired similar comics in other countries including Yps in Germany and Jippo in Scandinavia.
