= Diary of a Wimpy Kid (book) =

2007 novel by Jeff Kinney

- Cover of the first edition of the book
- Author: Jeff Kinney
- Illustrator: Jeff Kinney
- Cover artist: Jeff Kinney; Chad W. Beckerman
- Language: English
- Series: Diary of a Wimpy Kid
- Genre: Comedy, young adult fiction
- Publisher: Amulet Books
- Publication date: April 1, 2007
- Publication place: United States
- Media type: Print (paperback, hardcover)
- Pages: 221
- ISBN: 978-0-14-330383-1
- Followed by: Rodrick Rules

Diary of a Wimpy Kid is a children's illustrated novel written and illustrated by Jeff Kinney. It is the first book in the Diary of a Wimpy Kid series. The book is about a boy named Greg Heffley and his attempts to become popular in his first year of middle school.

Diary of a Wimpy Kid first appeared on FunBrain in 2004, where it was read 20 million times. The abridged hardcover adaptation was released on April 1, 2007. The book was named a New York Times bestseller, among other awards and received generally positive reviews. The book was adapted into a live action feature film, which released on March 19, 2010, and an animated film adaptation was released on Disney+ on December 3, 2021.

== Plot ==
Greg Heffley, an ambitious young boy who hopes to become famous, is gifted a diary by his overbearing mother, Susan, to detail his time in middle school. He recounts a local myth surrounding a moldy piece of cheese left at the school's basketball court; If someone touches the cheese, they contract the "Cheese Touch" and are excluded by the student body unless they pass it on by touching someone else. The last victim of the Cheese Touch moved away, ending the chain.

Greg describes his best friend, Rowley Jefferson, as childish and not very smart. At home, Greg is bullied by his older brother, Rodrick, and resents his spoiled little brother, a toddler named Manny. Greg's father, Frank, disapproves of his fixation on video games, and would rather Greg go outside and play sports. Near Halloween, Greg and Rowley are antagonized by a group of teenagers while trick-or-treating. They are chased by the group after Greg threatens to call the police, and they hide in his grandma's house. After being called home by Susan, they are drenched by Frank, who believed they were teenagers looking to toilet-paper their home.

Greg fails a geography test on state capitals after a girl named Patty Farrell reminds the teacher that he needs to cover the labeled map of the United States. At home, Greg's mother makes him audition for a play based on The Wizard of Oz, and he lands the role of a tree, while Patty is cast as Dorothy. During the performance, Greg becomes too nervous to sing. Patty becomes frustrated with Greg, and he begins throwing apples at her. Other cast members join in, and an apple breaks Patty's glasses, disabling her sight and thus forcing the play to be shut down.

During Christmas time, Greg decides to play a game with Rowley that ends in Rowley breaking his hand. Rowley returns to school with a plaster cast, and Greg becomes jealous of the attention Rowley receives from girls. Greg joins the Safety Patrol at school to raise his status, and gets Rowley to sign up as well. Greg and Rowley begin a comic strip in the school newspaper titled "Zoo-Wee Mama!" However, creative differences cause Greg to submit his own cartoons. Greg becomes the school cartoonist, but his ideas are heavily altered by the newspaper's editor.

After an incident where Greg chases some kindergartners with a worm on a stick and is mistaken for Rowley, Rowley gets suspended from the Safety Patrol for a week. However, after it is cleared up that Greg was the real culprit, Rowley is reinstated and promoted while Greg is dismissed. As the school year comes to a close, Greg aims to get a spot in the yearbook's Class Favorites page as the "Class Clown". Additionally, he learns that Rowley is the new cartoonist, and "Zoo-Wee Mama!" has become a hit.

Greg gets mad at Rowley for not listing him as a co-creator and hogging all the fame. Rowley argues by saying that "Zoo-Wee Mama!" was his idea and that Greg hardly contributed. As they argue, the teenagers from the Halloween night appear and force Rowley to eat the cheese; Greg got out of it by lying to be allergic to dairy, leaving Rowley to eat the whole thing. The next day, when everyone notices that the Cheese is gone, Greg lies to protect Rowley by saying that he threw it away, and the two become friends again. Greg receives his yearbook and after seeing that Rowley won "Class Clown", he throws it in the garbage, vowing to remind Rowley that he ate the cheese if he should ever let the title go to his head.

== Background ==
Cropped screenshot of the online version

In May 2004, FunBrain and Jeff Kinney released an online version of Diary of a Wimpy Kid. The website made daily entries from September of that year to June 2005. The online book became an instant hit, and had received approximately 20 million views by 2007. Many online readers requested a printed version. At the 2006 New York Comic Con Kinney proposed Diary of a Wimpy Kid to Charles Kochman, Editorial Director of the ComicArts division of Abrams Books, who purchased the rights to the book. According to Kochman, the two initially conceived it as a book for adults, believing it would appeal to audiences similar to that of the TV series The Wonder Years. Kochman brought it before the Abrams publishing board, which convinced Kinney and Kochman that it would be better aimed toward children. In 2007, Diary of a Wimpy Kid, an abridged version of the original online book, was published.

== Main characters ==
Greg Heffley
The main character, Greg, has trouble with family, friends, and his local middle school. He is very concerned about how popular he is at school, and he daydreams a lot about being rich and famous when he grows up. He tries to fit in at his school, but usually he does not succeed. Facing many challenges, Greg attempts to handle them very creatively, but unfortunately his antics often backfire on him.
Rowley Jefferson
Greg's best friend has a larger than average frame. He is always willing to do what Greg tells him, including dangerous stunts. Rowley goes on vacations all the time, which annoys Greg. Rowley is a loyal friend, but he sometimes behaves in an immature or childish manner. He also dresses in an unusual way.
Manny Heffley
Greg's "spoiled" little brother, a three-year-old toddler. He never gets in trouble no matter what, even when he really deserves it. Manny is not yet potty trained.
Rodrick Heffley
Rodrick is Greg's teenage brother and he never misses a chance to be cruel to Greg. He is known for sleeping excessively in the morning and for his rebellious attitude. Rodrick is part of a basement band (garage band in the movies) called "Löded Diper". Rodrick will do anything to embarrass Greg and will even cause problems for Manny to make everyone's life miserable.

== Sequels ==
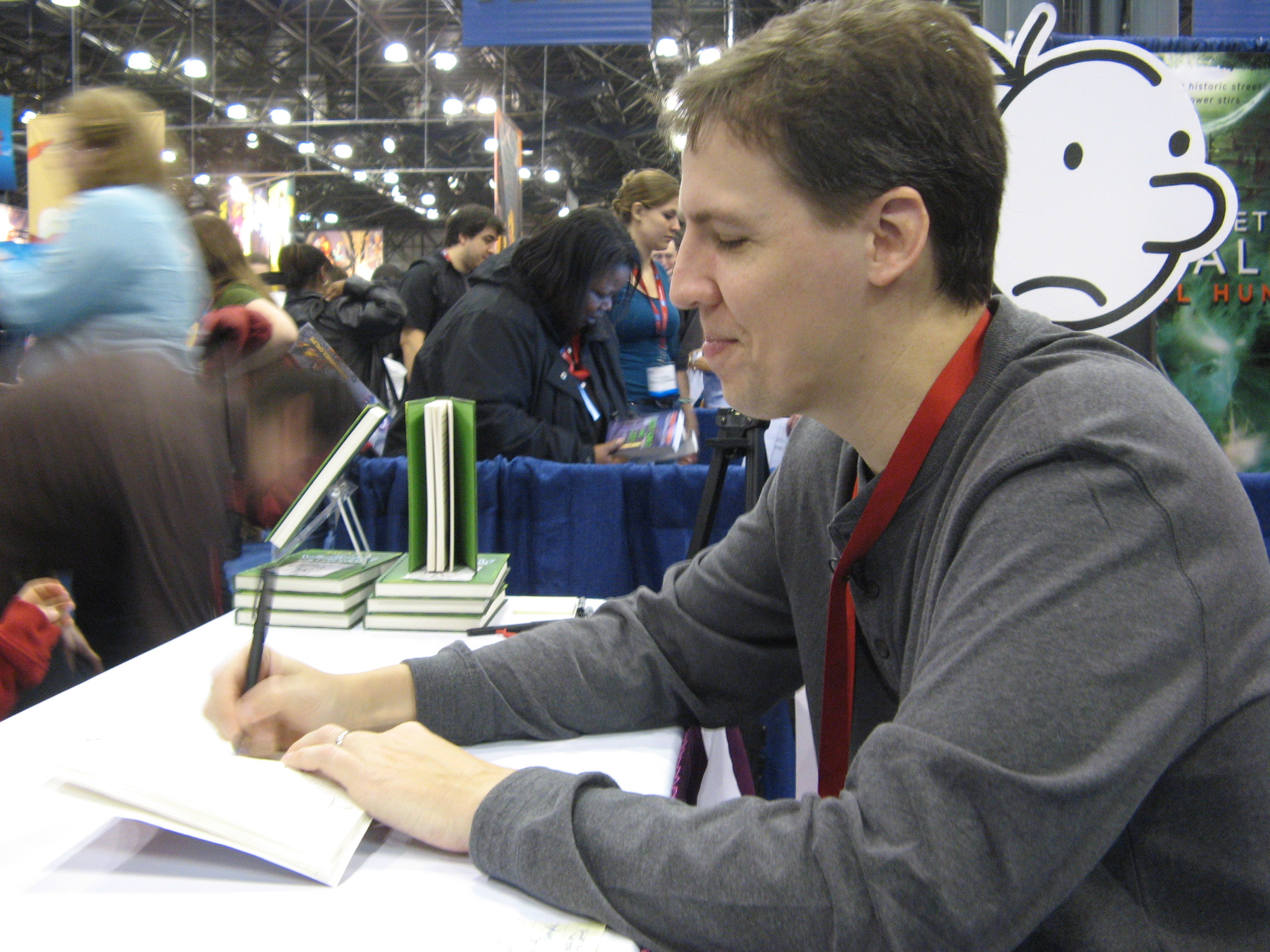
Author and illustrator Jeff Kinney signs copies of Diary of a Wimpy Kid in 2009.

Diary of a Wimpy Kid is the first book in an ongoing franchise. A total of nineteen Wimpy Kid books have been released, the sequels to the first book are: Rodrick Rules (2008) which was listed on the New York Times Best Sellers list for 117 weeks, The Last Straw (2009) which was on the New York Times Best Sellers list for 65 weeks, peaking at number one, Dog Days (2009) which was ranked at number one on the New York Times Best Sellers List for all 25 weeks of inclusion, making it the #1 best selling book of 2009, The Ugly Truth (2010), Cabin Fever (2011), The Third Wheel (2012), Hard Luck (2013), The Long Haul (2014), Old School (2015), Double Down (2016), The Getaway (2017), The Meltdown (2018), Wrecking Ball (2019), The Deep End (2020), Big Shot (2021), Diper Överlöde (2022), No Brainer (2023), Hot Mess (2024), Partypooper (2025), and Fight or Flight (2026).

== Reception ==
The book won the Blue Peter Book Award 2012, revealed live on British kids channel CBBC on March 1, 2012. In 2012 it was ranked number 76 on a list of the top 100 children's novels published by School Library Journal.

== Adaptations ==
A film adaptation, Diary of a Wimpy Kid, was released by 20th Century Fox on March 19, 2010. The film stars Zachary Gordon as Greg Heffley, Robert Capron as Rowley Jefferson, Steve Zahn as Frank Heffley (Dad), Rachael Harris as Susan Heffley (Mom), Devon Bostick as Rodrick Heffley, Chloë Grace Moretz as Angie Steadman (a character exclusive to the live-action film), and Connor & Owen Fielding as Manny Heffley, Greg's brother. It would later go on to spawn three sequels.

Another film adaptation, this time animated, serving as a reboot of the film series was released on December 3, 2021 exclusively on Disney+.
