= Jess Brallier =

American writer

Jess M. Brallier
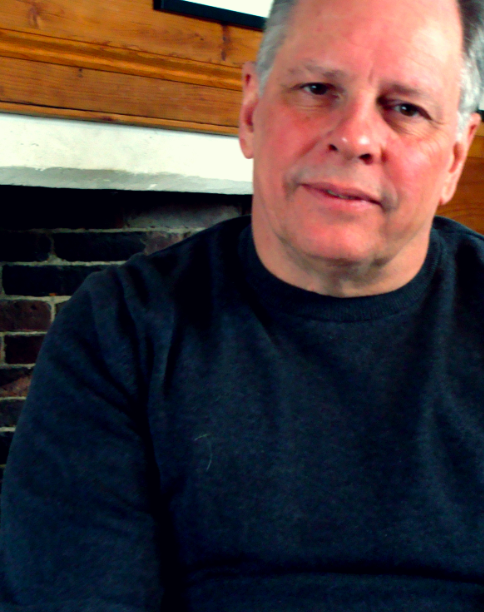
- Born: May 31, 1953; Ligonier, Pennsylvania, U.S.
- Education: University of Pittsburgh (B.A.); Boston University (M.S.)
- Occupations: Publisher, author, keynote speaker
- Known for: Creating Poptropica, founding Planet Dexter, launching Diary of a Wimpy Kid online
- Children: 2, including Max Brallier

Jess M. Brallier (born May 31, 1953) is a publisher working in various media, genres, and formats, such as bestselling books, popular web sites, apps, and virtual worlds, including Poptropica, one of the Internet's largest virtual worlds for kids. He helped launch bestselling brands such as Diary of a Wimpy Kid and Galactic Hot Dogs; and extended the Poptropica brand into toys, global education, and books. He is also the author or co-author of 31 books, including Lawyers and Other Reptiles.

== Publishing career ==
Jess Brallier initially held marketing positions for trade book publishers, including Harcourt Brace Jovanovich, Little Brown, and Addison Wesley. In 1992, Brallier founded the children's publishing imprint, Planet Dexter.

In 2007, Brallier launched Poptropica, the online role-playing website for kids. Readers actively participate in stories on the website with their own virtual characters (“avatars”).

Poptropica became the world's largest virtual world for kids: Visitors from more than 130 countries enjoyed the site in more than 100 languages, and the site averages 10 million kids a month. It was named one of Time Magazine's 50 Best Websites and one of Family Fun magazine's top 10 fun websites.

Brallier used the website FunBrain to be the first to publish Jeff Kinney’s Diary of a Wimpy Kid online in 2004, two years before the property was published in print. In 2013, Brallier did likewise with the virtual graphic novel series Galactic Hot Dogs.

Brallier served as Senior Vice President and Publisher of Pearson's Family Education Network, an online publisher for parents, teachers, and reference readers. Family Education Network operated Funbrain and Poptropica until it was acquired by Sandbox Partners in 2015.

Of the 30+ published books that Brallier authored or co-authored, half are adult titles and half children's books.

Brallier also won book publishing's Literary Marketplace Individual Achievement Award in recognition of his marketing campaign for three New York Times bestsellers: Reinventing Government by David Osborne, Mama Makes Up Her Mind by Bailey White, and Touchpoints by T. Berry Brazelton.

Brallier is also a keynote speaker.

== Personal life ==
A native of Ligonier, Pennsylvania, Brallier is a graduate of the University of Pittsburgh (B.A.) and Boston University (M.S.). He and his wife reside in New York City. Brallier works out of Boston and New York. They have two adult children, one of whom is Max Brallier, author of Galactic Hot Dogs.

== Books ==
Tess's Tree (illustrated by Peter H. Reynolds)
Presidential Wit and Wisdom: Maxims, Mottoes, Sound Bites, Speeches, Asides, and Memorable Quotes from America’s Presidents with Sally Chabert
Celebrate America with Sally Chabert
Lawyers and Other Reptiles
Lawyers and Other Reptiles II: The Appeal
Y2Kids: Your Guide to the Millennium
Medical Wit and Wisdom: The Best Medical Quotations from Hippocrates to Groucho Marx with Sally Chabert
The Hot Dog Cookbook: The Wiener Work the World Awaited
The Pessimist’s Journal of Very, Very Bad Days with Richard McDonough
The Pessimist’s Journal of Very, Very Bad Days of the 1980s with Richard McDonough
This Book Really Sucks!
“Whaddaya Doin’ in There?!” A Bathroom Reader for Kids
Play Ball!
Money Madness
The Cocktail Hour with Sally Chabert
Write Your Own Living Will with Bradley E. Smith
Bouncing Science
Hairy Science
Shadowy Science
Thumbs Up Science
Who Was Albert Einstein?.
Calculator Mania
Shake, Rattle, and Roll! Cool Things to Do with Dice
Going, Going, Gone: This Book Disappears!
Magnetic Pattern Blocks The Really, Really Classy Donald Trump Quiz Book
