= The Meltdown =

The Meltdown may refer to:

- The Meltdown with Jonah and Kumail, an American stand-up comedy television series
- Ice Age: The Meltdown, a 2006 film
- Diary of a Wimpy Kid: The Meltdown, a 2018 novel
- The Meltdown (Denny's brand), a ghost kitchen

== See also ==
- Meltdown (disambiguation)
