= Fact Monster =

Children's educational website

- Website type: Fact center
- Owner: Infoplease
- Creator: Infoplease
- Website: www.factmonster.com
- Commercial: Yes
- Registration: none
- Launched: 2000

Fact Monster is an educational technology website geared towards children. It is owned by Infoplease and, like the Infoplease site, it contains several reference works under one umbrella, including the Columbia Encyclopedia, Random House Dictionary, an atlas and an almanac. It also features quizzes, flashcards, a homework center and Flash-based games.

Fact Monster launched in 2000, initially as Infopleasekids.com. In August 2000, Pearson PLC acquired Family Education Network (FEN) which included infoplease.com. In May 2015, Pearson sold FEN to Sandbox Partners.

The website contains facts on thousands of subjects, including sports, entertainment, geography, history, biography, education, and health.

== Reception ==
In March 2001, it won a Webby Award for best youth site. In 2003, it was on the annual list of the Best Free Reference WebSites by the Reference and User Services Association (RUSA) of the American Library Association (ALA) to recognize outstanding reference sites on the World Wide Web.

In 2001, Lev Grossman wrote a positive review in Time ending with, "It's so cool that kids will forget it's educational." In 2016, Michelle Breckon from Kent State University Libraries wrote in Reference Reviews that the website is "visually appealing" and has a variety for "kids of all ages"; but its navigation can be difficult, lacks citations, and the simple games may be a distraction.

== Updates ==
In November, 2026 it was found by sources that it hasn't been updated for a while.

== See also ==
- Game Classroom
- FunBrain
