= No-Brainer =

No-Brainer or No Brainer may refer to:

- "The No-Brainer", the 12th episode of the television series Fringe
- "It's a No-Brainer", an episode of Mr. Show with Bob and David
- "No Brainer" (song), a 2018 song by DJ Khaled
- ”No Brainer”, a song by the rapper Hodgy Beats
- No Brainer, a 2008 film by Dave, Shelly and Chainsaw
- "No Brainer", an episode of the TV series Gadget & the Gadgetinis
- Diary of a Wimpy Kid: No Brainer, the eighteenth book in the Diary of a Wimpy Kid series
