= Diary of a Wimpy Kid: Dog Days =

Diary of a Wimpy Kid: Dog Days may refer to:

- Diary of a Wimpy Kid: Dog Days (novel), a 2009 book by Jeff Kinney
- Diary of a Wimpy Kid: Dog Days (film), a 2012 film partially based on the book, starring Zachary Gordon
