= Diary of a Wimpy Kid: Rodrick Rules (disambiguation) =

Diary of a Wimpy Kid: Rodrick Rules is a 2008 novel written by Jeff Kinney and the second installment in the Diary of a Wimpy Kid franchise.

Diary of a Wimpy Kid: Rodrick Rules may also refer to:

- Diary of a Wimpy Kid: Rodrick Rules (2011 film), a live-action film directed by David Bowers
- Diary of a Wimpy Kid: Rodrick Rules (2022 film), an animated film directed by Luke Cormican
