= Game Classroom =

- Website type: Online Games
- Owner: Earlier Media
- Website: http://www.gameclassroom.com/
- Registration: Optional
- Launched: 2009

Game Classroom is an educational gaming website for kindergarten to 6th grade students. The site is a product of Earlier Media, a site known for its other website Kideos.

== Content ==
The website collects games from other websites and categorizes them by subject, skill, and grade level. The site also features Homework Help, which includes sample problems, learning tips, and other online resources. All of the content in the Homework Help section has been created by professional educators.

== See also ==
- Fact Monster
- FunBrain
