= Meltdown =

Meltdown may refer to:

== Science and technology ==
- Nuclear meltdown, a severe nuclear reactor accident
- Meltdown (security vulnerability), affecting computer processors
- Mutational meltdown, in population genetics

== Arts and entertainment ==
=== Music ===
- Meltdown (festival) in London
- Meltdown Records, a Slovakian record label

==== Albums ====
- Meltdown (Ash album) or the title song, 2004
- Meltdown (GrimSkunk album), 1996
- Meltdown (Icehouse album), 2002
- Meltdown (Massacre album), 2001
- Meltdown (Steve Taylor album) or the title song, 1984
- Meltdown (Vinnie Moore album) or the title song, 1991
- Meltdown (EP), by Pitbull, 2013
- Meltdown: Live in Mexico City, by King Crimson, or the title song, 2018
- Meltdown, by John Taylor, 1999
- Meltdown!, by Justin Roberts, 2006

==== Songs ====
- "Meltdown" (Love and Death song), 2013
- "Meltdown" (Niall Horan song), 2023
- "Meltdown" (Stromae song), 2014
- "Meltdown" (Travis Scott Song), 2023
- "Meltdown", by AC/DC from Stiff Upper Lip, 2000
- "Meltdown!", by the Aquabats from Charge!!, 2005
- "...Meltdown", by Enter Shikari from A Flash Flood of Colour, 2012
- "Meltdown", by Godflesh from Slavestate, 1991
- "Meltdown", by Live from The Distance to Here, 1999
- "Meltdown", by Loverboy from Keep It Up, 1983
- "Meltdown", by Motionless in White from Scoring the End of the World, 2022
- "Meltdown", by Of Mice & Men from Earthandsky, 2019
- "Meltdown", by Quartz, 1989
- "Meltdown", by Upon a Burning Body from Fury, 2022
- "Meltdown", by Watchtower from Energetic Disassembly, 1985
- "Meltdown", from the film soundtrack album Requiem for a Dream, 2000

=== Publications ===
- Meltdown (Clearfield and Tilcsik book), 2018 on system failures
- Meltdown (Woods book), 2009, on the 2008 financial crisis
- Meltdown (Image Comics), a comic book mini-series
- Meltdown: The End of the Age of Greed, a 2009 book by Paul Mason
- Havok and Wolverine: Meltdown, a 1988 Marvel Comics limited series
- Diary of a Wimpy Kid: The Meltdown, a 2018 children's novel
- Tabitha Smith, a Marvel Comics character, codename Meltdown

=== Film ===
- High Risk (1995 film), also known as Meltdown, a Hong Kong film starring Jet Li
- Meltdown (2004 film), an American film starring Bruce Greenwood
- Ice Age: The Meltdown, a 2006 animated film
- Meltdown: Days of Destruction, a 2006 American film starring Casper Van Dien

=== Television ===
- Meltdown, part two of RoboCop: Prime Directives, a 2001 miniseries based on the RoboCop film series
- "Meltdown" (Farscape episode)
- "Meltdown" (JAG), an episode of JAG and the second part of the backdoor pilot of NCIS
- "Meltdown" (Red Dwarf), a television episode
- "Meltdown" (The Batman), a television episode
- Meltdown, a character in the 2007–2009 Transformers: Animated series
- The Meltdown with Jonah and Kumail, a stand-up comedy television series that aired on Comedy Central

=== Video games ===
- Meltdown (1986 video game), an action-adventure game for the Amstrad CPC
- Meltdown (1990 video game), a light gun shooter video game for the Atari 7800
- Cinder (Killer Instinct), a character originally named Meltdown in the fighting game series
- Meltdown, a game by Jagex
- Meltdown, a (status) magic attack in Final Fantasy VIII
- Meltdown, an in-game movie in Grand Theft Auto V
- Meltdown, a Minecraft minigame played in MC Championship
- Geometry Dash Meltdown, a 2015 spin-off of video game Geometry Dash

== Other uses ==
- Tantrum, an emotional outburst
- Autistic meltdown, a stress reaction
- Meltdown (bar chain), a French bar chain
