= Diary of a Wimpy Kid: Rodrick Rules =

2008 novel by Jeff Kinney

- Author: Jeff Kinney
- Illustrator: Jeff Kinney
- Cover artist: Jeff Kinney
- Language: English
- Series: Diary of a Wimpy Kid
- Genre: Comedy
- Publisher: Amulet Books (US); Puffin Books (UK)
- Publication date: February 1, 2008 February 5, 2009 (paperback re-issue)
- Publication place: United States
- Media type: Print (paperback, hardcover)
- Pages: 217
- ISBN: 978-0-8109-9473-7
- Preceded by: Diary of a Wimpy Kid
- Followed by: The Last Straw

Diary of a Wimpy Kid: Rodrick Rules is a children's novel by American author and cartoonist Jeff Kinney, based on the FunBrain.com version. It is the sequel to Diary of a Wimpy Kid, followed by The Last Straw. The hardcover was released on February 1, 2008. Rodrick Rules was named New York Times bestseller among awards and praise. A live-action film based on the book was released on March 25, 2011, and an animated film adaptation was released on Disney+ on December 2, 2022.

== Plot ==
The book starts with Greg explaining how bad his summer vacation was with his annoying older brother Rodrick, who knows a secret that Greg is trying to keep. Greg is initially excited to return to school, but he still has the Cheese Touch from the previous year; he gets away with passing it on to a new kid. Greg and Rodrick's mother, Susan, starts a "Mom Bucks" program to get the two brothers to get along with each other. Rodrick initially wastes his money on heavy metal magazines, while Greg saves his. Rodrick has an upcoming science project, but he clearly shows no effort and asks his family members to do it for him.

When Rodrick seemingly catches the flu, Susan and their father Frank leave the house for the night; Rodrick then calls every friend he knows and throws a party, while locking Greg in the basement. A month later, at his friend Rowley's house, Rowley has play money identical to that of Mom Bucks, taking it home to put under his mattress. When Greg forgets to do one of his history assignments, he has to borrow it from Rodrick and pay him $20,000 in Mom Bucks. The next day, when Rodrick tries to cash Greg's counterfeit Mom Bucks, Susan discovers them and confiscates all of Greg's.

After Thanksgiving, Rodrick's party is revealed by a photo, and he is grounded for a month. Despite having nothing to do with the party, Greg is also accused of being Rodrick's accomplice, and he is banned from playing video games for 2 weeks. Despite being grounded, Rodrick starts practicing for the talent show; Frank ends his punishment 2 weeks early to stop listening to Löded Diper, Rodrick's band, daily. After Greg purposely hurts Rowley by putting a dumbbell in a pillow that Rowley kicks during a sleepover, Greg has to perform in the talent show with a first-grader named Scotty Douglas, who Rowley assisted; the two do not qualify, but Löded Diper does. Eager to do the talent show, Rodrick turns in his science project a day early, but must redo it since it lacked several requirements and did not make clear sense.

Frank tries to tell Rodrick to quit the talent show, but Rodrick insists on doing it so that he can send it to record label companies, so that he and his band can get noticed, allowing him to drop out of school. During the talent show, Rodrick's band has its performance taped by Susan so he can send it to the record companies, but the video is deemed useless after it was revealed that Susan was talking the whole time, and everything she said was heard on the tape. Despite the latter not being involved, Rodrick blames Greg, and they argue, making the parents send both to their rooms.

A few hours later, Rodrick tells Greg that his "secret is out". At Leisure Towers, the retirement home where their grandfather lives, Rodrick took Greg's diary and ran, but he tripped on a board game. Greg grabbed his diary, ran to the toilet, and tried to destroy it, but he went into the women's bathroom, where he had to hide until security removed him. However, the next day, Greg actually gets popular at school; the story went from Greg being stuck in the women's bathroom to infiltrating the girls' locker room at Crossland High School.

Having felt sorry for the video of Löded Diper at the talent show, which became a worldwide internet hit due to the video featuring Susan's dancing, the story ends with Greg helping Rodrick redo his science project.

== Reception ==
Rodrick Rules received positive reviews. Positive attention was given to the book for its effective portrayal of Greg Heffley, and for its humor. The books' strategy of using illustrations as a means of exposition was also praised.

== Sequel ==
Diary of a Wimpy Kid: Rodrick Rules is the second book in the series. The third, Diary of a Wimpy Kid: The Last Straw was released on January 13, 2009.

== Film adaptations ==
=== Live-action film ===
Brad Simpson stated he anticipated a sequel movie if the first film was a success. "Our writing staff are writing a sequel right now, "Rodrick Rules," which would be based on the second book" ... "And, you know, we hope that the people to see a second movie, so that we are in position of going again right away and making another film. I certainly know that the fans would like to see all the books made into movies."

Fox 2000 greenlit the sequel and Zachary Gordon returned as Greg Heffley. Steve Zahn (Frank Heffley), Devon Bostick (Rodrick Heffley) and Rachael Harris (Susan Heffley) also returned. The film was directed by David Bowers and the screenplay was written by Gabe Sachs and Jeff Judah. Principal photography began in Vancouver in August 2010. A few new characters appeared in the film, including Peyton List as Holly Hills. The film was released on March 25, 2011.

=== Animated film ===
On December 3, 2021, an animated film based on the first book was released on Disney+. On Disney+ Day 2021, Kinney revealed that the first sequel, based on Rodrick Rules, was released on December 2, 2022.
