= The Wimpy Kid Movie Diary =

Book by Jeff Kinney

- U.S. cover of the 2nd Revised Edition
- Author: Jeff Kinney
- Illustrator: Jeff Kinney
- Cover artist: Jeff Kinney
- Language: English
- Series: Diary of a Wimpy Kid
- Genre: Non-fiction
- Publisher: Amulet Books
- Publication date: Original: March 16, 2010; 1st Revised Edition: February 15, 2011; 2nd Revised Edition: June 26, 2012
- Publication place: United States
- Media type: Print (Hardcover), also in paperback
- Pages: 247
- ISBN: 978-0-8109-9616-8

The Wimpy Kid Movie Diary is a non-fiction movie tie-in book by Jeff Kinney about the making of the 2010 film Diary of a Wimpy Kid. The book received revisions to include information about the making of the 2011 film Diary of a Wimpy Kid: Rodrick Rules and the 2012 film Diary of a Wimpy Kid: Dog Days.

== Background ==
It starts off with how the series was created. Next, it shows how they gradually prepared the movie for filming, such as choosing the cast, writing the script, and finding the right location.

When it talks about filming, other subjects are woven within, especially the actors' downtime and designing props. It also has some reflections about the actors leaving before it talks about post-production. The book ends with the release of the film and a "scrapbook."

The book was updated with behind the scenes info of Diary of a Wimpy Kid: Rodrick Rules and Diary of a Wimpy Kid: Dog Days, each gaining short sections. A sequel for behind the scenes info of Diary of a Wimpy Kid: The Long Haul was published in 2017 as "The Next Chapter".

== See also ==
- Diary of a Wimpy Kid (series)
- Diary of a Wimpy Kid (film)
- Diary of a Wimpy Kid: Rodrick Rules (film)
- Diary of a Wimpy Kid: Dog Days (film)
