= Diary of a Wimpy Kid: Hot Mess =

2024 book by Jeff Kinney

- Author: Jeff Kinney
- Illustrator: Jeff Kinney
- Language: English
- Series: Diary of a Wimpy Kid
- Publication date: October 22, 2024
- Publication place: United States
- Preceded by: No Brainer
- Followed by: Partypooper

Diary of a Wimpy Kid: Hot Mess is the 19th book in the Diary of a Wimpy Kid book series written and illustrated by Jeff Kinney. The sequel to No Brainer, the book was unveiled on January 26, 2024 and was released on October 22, 2024.

== Plot ==
Greg talks about how his grandmother became the lead of the Heffley family by cooking meatballs that everyone likes. Gramma wants the Heffley family to go on a trip to Ruttyneck Island and take a photo in front of a lighthouse as a present for her 75th birthday.

After a ferry ride over, the Heffley family arrives at the beach house, but they see Aunt Gretchen and her kids are already there. Greg then talks about Aunt Veronica’s famous dog, Dazzle, who became famous after Veronica decided to film clips of Dazzle and post them on social media. They weren't ready to deal with all the pressures of fame yet, resulting in disaster for both of them.

The next day, the family goes to the beach. Greg does not want to go in the water because he is worried there are sharks and the lifeguards aren’t paying attention, so he decides to relax on the sand instead. Later, Greg tries to fly a kite, but he crashes into a sandcastle, so he ties it to the cooler and starts relaxing again. When Greg wakes up, most of his family's beach stuff floats out to sea. While trying to retrieve it, Greg thinks he got stung by a jellyfish, when it is only a clump of seaweed. Greg decides to have some sandwiches from the cooler, but they were the only thing weighing it down, and the kite takes it off the ground. It soon lands in sand dunes that are in a protected plover nesting area.

The following evening back at the beach house, the family has spaghetti and garlic bread for dinner, while the meatballs are in separate bags for each person. Later, Uncle Gary comes to the house to ask Greg's father for money for a ferry ride home; Gary was on the island because he wanted to perform as pirate Wild William, but they did not want him there, as Skullduggery Cove, the place that he was supposed to work at as the pirate, was being rebranded as a butterfly sanctuary. Once he met up with the rest of the family, he decided he also wanted to take a vacation, and joined the group.

The family goes to the lighthouse tour, but there are a lot of people in the stairwell. When the tour is over, Greg does not want to go in the stairwell again, and the tour guide has to carry him back down. That evening, the family has leftovers, except Dazzle, who refuses to have them. Afterward, they play some games, one of which is called Boardwalk Baron, which Greg’s father used to play with his family. There are not many playing tokens, so some people use random items. They come up with their own punishments, including turning the portable crib into a jail. Soon, Manny wins the game, and Greg’s father loses. The loud noises disturb Susan, who had been trying to sleep in her room the whole time, so she forcefully dumps the game in the trash and says that their game is officially over.

The next morning, Greg goes out on the boardwalk. He wants to become a social media star like Dazzle, so he makes a channel called “One Lick Ice Cream Reviews”. He goes to several ice cream places, but they won’t let Greg have a free sample. Greg finally finds a place, but when he posts his video, the channel has no followers, so he finds a picture on his mother’s camera roll, crops it, and changes his profile photo to that.

The next day, the family realizes everyone has forgotten to bring white clothes for the picture. Dinner hadn't been prepared yet, so the grown-ups go shopping while the kids make dinner, where the kids make a big mess. As a result, the family goes out for dinner at Palazzo Pomodoro. When they get there, the hostess says that she couldn’t find their names in the system. When she spoke to the manager about a family who was late, Greg’s family pretends to be that family.

When the food comes, Aunt Veronica takes a bite into a meatball, realizing it was one of Gramma’s meatballs, which leads to Susan and her sisters accusing one another of stealing the recipe and selling it to the restaurant. Later, the family who was late arrives, and they start eating Greg’s family’s food. The manager calls the cops, and Greg’s family takes their picture at the police station. Once they returned to the beach house, Aunt Cakey becomes upset because Vincent has disappeared with his stuff.

The next morning, Greg sees many people outside the house, and he sees that Dazzle was on his new profile photo. The family leaves the island, but Dazzle remained on the island with Vincent, shocking Aunt Veronica and Susan. Greg’s aunts decide to surprise their grandmother because it was her birthday. When they arrive, the security guard says that he wouldn’t let them in until he called their grandmother, but she doesn’t pick up, so Greg’s family sneaks in. Upon entering, they discover that their grandmother was having her party in the recreation center. She apologized to everyone for not inviting them, and they clean up the recreation center shortly after.

Greg takes out the trash while cleaning up, finding a package of frozen meatballs from the restaurant, and shows his grandmother the bag; It turns out she actually bought the meatballs and never made them. Greg considered telling his family the truth, but he chose to keep the secret so he can become the next head of the family. He promises his grandmother's secret is safe with him.

== Reception ==
The book has gotten mostly positive feedback. Common Sense Media rated the book 3 out 5 stars, while Kirkus Reviews remarked that the book was "An entertaining take on family values, Wimpy Kid style."
