= Diary of a Wimpy Kid: The Ugly Truth =

Novel by Jeff Kinney

- Cover art
- Author: Jeff Kinney
- Illustrator: Jeff Kinney
- Cover artist: Jeff Kinney and Chad W. Beckerman
- Language: English
- Series: Diary of a Wimpy Kid
- Genre: Comedy
- Publisher: Amulet Books (US); Puffin Books (UK)
- Publication date: November 9, 2010; February 1, 2012 (paperback reissue)
- Publication place: United States
- Media type: Print (paperback, hardcover)
- Pages: 219
- ISBN: 978-0-8109-8491-2
- Preceded by: Dog Days
- Followed by: Cabin Fever

Diary of a Wimpy Kid: The Ugly Truth is a 2010 children's fiction book by American author and cartoonist Jeff Kinney and is the fifth book in the Diary of a Wimpy Kid series. The Ugly Truth sold 548,000 copies in its initial week of publication.

Kinney initially struggled with the decision of whether Greg would be a non-aging "cartoon character" or a literary character that would age and go through puberty, deciding to make it one of the book's themes. Kinney also debated over whether to end the series with five books, eventually deciding to continue the series.

== Summary ==
Greg explains that after his falling-out with Rowley, as seen in the previous book, they are no longer friends. Susan, Greg’s mother, goes back to college to stimulate her mind, and the Heffley men must care for themselves, but food is often ruined, and Greg is short of clean clothes. Frank, Greg's father makes him responsible for waking himself up, so Greg puts his alarm clock under his bed, but the ticking prevents him from getting sleep. The next morning, before an assembly, he accidentally activates the school fire alarm. The school closes early due to nobody washing their hands in the middle of flu season, so Greg had to call Frank to pick him up from school.

A maid, Isabella, arrives to help clean the house after school, but she only spends her time watching television and eating snacks; after Greg found one of her socks, he also discovered that she has been napping in his bed. Frank takes Greg to the former's dentist, Dr. Kagan, who takes a very different approach to Greg's previous dentist. After Greg accidentally bites Dr. Kagan's finger, Dr. Kagan prescribes headgear for Greg's overbite. He loses it the next day and soon finds Manny wearing it, vowing to never wear it again.

At the school lock-in on Friday night, Greg is shocked that about 90% of the kids there are boys, including Rowley. Mr. Tanner, a chaperone, confiscates their cell phones; at 3:00 AM, some parents arrive to take their kids home because they have not answered their cell phones, leaving Greg and Rowley behind. On Monday, Greg becomes sick from the lack of sleep on Friday night, and Susan leaves him at home with Isabella. He is waken up by noise from downstairs; Isabella had invited all the neighborhood maids to watch soap operas, but Susan arrives home early and fires her, making Greg happy. The next day, Rowley has a zit on his forehead and tells Greg he's "becoming a man". Susan and Frank talk to Greg about their experiences of being late bloomers. The next day, Greg writes a fake note to Rowley signed "The Girls" about how no one likes his zit.

Jordan Jury, a popular kid in the grade above Greg, invites him and Rowley to his party, but Susan says he cannot go because his Uncle Gary's fourth wedding is that weekend. Greg worries about reading the Old Testament because adults think it's cute when a kid cannot pronounce a word, and he is also nervous about getting "The Talk" from his 95-year-old great-grandmother, Gammie. On the ride to her house, Greg hears Susan talking about picking up his tuxedo, exciting Greg, thinking he's going to be a groomsman. There, he sleeps in a crowded room with all the family's bachelors, sneaking out and sleeping in the bathroom, waking just in time before Gammie comes in to take a bath.

Before the rehearsal dinner, Greg describes how old and valuable her belongings are; he says he ate some old taffy once and got very sick, and he later saw a photo of his father eating the same candy when he was Greg's age. He finds out that he will not be a groomsman, but an assistant flower boy to Manny, to the former's dismay. During the wedding reception, Uncle Gary's best man, Leonard, gives a speech about how Uncle Gary and Sonja got engaged; at a baseball game, Gary was about to break up with Sonja so he could date her sister, but an airplane with a banner reading "Marry me Sonja?" (not meant for Gary's Sonja) coincidentally flew over the stadium, and Sonja reacted to it. She gets upset by this, and Greg thinks they will soon divorce.

Back at Gammie's house, Greg gets "The Talk" from her, who tells him that getting older is not all it is cracked up to be. When he returns to school on Monday, Greg finds out that he dodged a bullet; Jordan invited kids in Greg's grade to use them as servants. Susan puts her academic career on hold to spend more time with the family. Greg and Rowley reconcile when Greg chooses to make a difference rather than waiting for Rowley to come to him. Despite Frank and Uncle Joe wanting Greg to take his future more seriously, he takes Gammie's advice, relating more to Uncle Gary.

== Reception ==
Critical reception for The Ugly Truth has been mostly positive, with the book gaining praise from the Los Angeles Times and the National Post. The School Library Journal gave a positive review for the entry while Common Sense Media commented that the book was not as "fresh and irreverent" as its predecessors.
