= Diary of a Wimpy Kid: Partypooper =

2025 book by Jeff Kinney

- Author: Jeff Kinney
- Language: English
- Series: Diary of a Wimpy Kid
- Genre: Children's literature Graphic novel
- Published: October 21, 2025
- Publisher: Amulet Books
- Publication date: October 21, 2025
- Publication place: United States
- Pages: 224
- ISBN: 9781419782695
- Preceded by: Hot Mess
- Followed by: Fight or Flight

Diary of a Wimpy Kid: Partypooper is the 20th book in the Diary of a Wimpy Kid book series written and illustrated by Jeff Kinney. The sequel to Diary of a Wimpy Kid: Hot Mess, the book was unveiled on February 27, 2025. The design of the cover is a celebration for the 20th book in the series, marking a significant reach. It was released on October 21, 2025.

== Plot ==
Greg Heffley is expecting a surprise birthday party, thinking that a pie-baking contest his mother is attending on the same day is fake. When he attends, he discovers that the pie-baking contest was real, and that his whole family has forgotten it was his birthday. After the incident goes viral, his parents (especially Susan) are shamed by social media and are guilted into throwing him a "blowout" party which Greg plans to maximize for as much presents as possible by inviting many people. Before the party, Greg and his dad, Frank, are buying comic books when Greg discovers that a misprinted "MicroCreatures" (a parody of Pokémon) trading card exists, depicting a three-eyed "Theeble". It is worth a lot of money, so Greg ditches the comics and sets his heart on the card, even though an online group named the three-eyed Theeble hunters was also looking for it. As the party gets closer, he discovers that the card was shipped close to where he lives, meaning that he might actually have a chance of obtaining it. The party ends in disaster thanks to a deer living in the unmowed grass next door and Susan and Frank's reputations are ruined, but Greg ends up getting the trading card that he wanted because of Aunt Nancy and hid it from his younger brother Manny, only to realize that it is no longer rare, due to popular demand. He still tries to cash on it as his is the original copy, but it turns out that Manny Heffley drew the Theeble as a dinosaur, making it worthless. However, after a new kid's father recognizes Greg (as the boy who once party crashed his son's party) they ask him to host his child's birthday party, Greg accepts once the father pays good money and manages to start a successful party-hosting side hustle with his best friend Rowley by his side.

== Sequel ==
The twenty-first book of the series, Diary of a Wimpy Kid: Fight or Flight released on October 20, 2026.
