= Diary of a Wimpy Kid: Cabin Fever =

2011 children's book by Jeff Kinney

- Author: Jeff Kinney
- Illustrator: Jeff Kinney
- Cover artist: Jeff Kinney
- Language: English
- Series: Diary of a Wimpy Kid
- Genre: Comedy/Survival
- Publisher: Amulet Books (US); Puffin Books (UK)
- Publication date: November 15, 2011; January 31, 2013 (paperback)
- Publication place: United States
- Media type: Print (hardcover), (paperback)
- Pages: 224 (217 story pages)
- ISBN: 978-1-4197-0296-9
- Preceded by: The Ugly Truth
- Followed by: The Third Wheel

Diary of a Wimpy Kid: Cabin Fever is a 2011 children's book and the sixth book in the Diary of a Wimpy Kid series, written by American author Jeff Kinney. The book was released on November 15, 2011, the paperback edition was released on January 31, 2013, and was the fastest-selling book of 2011, giving him the third-strongest opening-week sales for a children's author. Cabin Fever had a first printing run of six million copies, which Amulet Books stated was one of their most significant titles for that year. In 2012 Kinney won a "Best Author" Children's Choice Award from the Children's Book Council for Cabin Fever. The book received widespread acclaim from critics and is frequently said to be one of the best books in the series. The book was followed by 2012's The Third Wheel.

== Plot ==
Greg has problems with the arrival of Christmas and the concept of Santa Claus's surveillance of good or bad children, and he wonders how this could be. His mother stumbles upon a doll known as "Santa's Scout" and uses it to make her children behave well. However, Greg's paranoia regarding the doll is taken advantage of by Rodrick, who uses it to prank his brother.

Meanwhile, Greg is preoccupied with a gaming website known as "Net Kritterz" and tending to the needs of his virtual pet and the website's required paid features. So he and Rowley devise various money-making ideas, which all backfire or fail. They soon decide to publish their tabloid newspaper, the Neighborhood Tattler, but find difficulties in selling and advertising it, and Greg fears that Rowley's additions to the newspaper will only damage their chances of selling copies.

Temporarily, they abandon their project to start their holiday bazaar after Greg buys "Drummies" (fried chicken) at his local supermarket that are cheaper than the ones sold at his school's holiday bazaar and decide to hang up posters advertising the bazaar on the walls of the school on brick walls, and the boys' antics are witnessed and published in the community newspaper, as their attempts at advertisement have accidentally vandalized the school. Worries of being discovered fill Greg with paranoia, worrying that he will be shipped off to a juvenile detention center, and he dreads the day when his identity will be revealed.

Eventually, Rowley snaps and tells the school via an anonymous tip (reading "Me and Greg Heffley vandalized the school") that they were the ones who accidentally vandalized the school, but he doesn't admit his involvement. Greg confesses to his responsibility for it, and vice-principal Roy gives him two choices: Greg could name the "Me" person, and they would both take the punishment together, or Greg could take the punishment himself. Greg chooses the second option, and he had to stay after school and scrub the paint off the walls with bleach.

When he gets home, however, he finds a note from the police on the front door of the Heffley house, assuming that vice-principal Roy snitched on him to the police. A sudden blizzard forces the Heffleys within their home, resulting in a power outage that spoils their food and causes a basement flood.

Meanwhile, Frank, Greg's father, is stuck at a hotel near his workplace, and the family lived in hunger and boredom for the following few days, but then Rowley comes over and tells Greg that his house still has electricity along with the rest of the town except for apparently the Heffleys' house. Greg checks the family's electricity box, only to find that the power has been turned off in all rooms of the house except Manny's bedroom, and soon discovers that he has been living in there luxuriously and surrounded by food, warmth, and toys without telling his family since nobody taught him how to tie his shoes. The electricity is returned to the house, and Frank returns with food for the rest of his family.

The following day is Christmas, and Greg discovers himself on the cover of the newspaper for anonymously shoveling the walkway leading up to the Church (however, only to recover a tag he'd hung up on the giving tree requesting money) that allows a soup kitchen to be opened. He chooses to exploit himself on the front cover of his own tabloid newspaper so that he can receive gifts that people may send to him.

== Reception ==
The book received critical acclaim, with the book being nominated for a 2012 Harvey Award for a "Special Award for Humor in Comics". Publishers Weekly and Entertainment Weekly both praised the entry, with Publishers Weekly writing that although the snow storm doesn't occur until later in the read, "it's unlikely that anyone will mind".

== Adaptations ==
In December 2012, Jeff Kinney announced that he was working on an animated adaptation of Cabin Fever to air around Christmas 2013. In August 2013, Kinney stated it would be a half-hour television special, and would air on Fox in late 2014.

On September 8, 2023, Disney announced they would be releasing a film adaptation of Cabin Fever for Disney+ on December 8, 2023 called Diary of a Wimpy Kid Christmas: Cabin Fever.
