= Diary of a Wimpy Kid =

Comic-style book series by Jeff Kinney

- Created by: Jeff Kinney
- Original work: Diary of a Wimpy Kid (2007; preceded by online version on Funbrain in 2004)
- Owners: Wimpy Kid, Inc. (IP holder); Abrams Books (publishing; under Amulet Books label); The Walt Disney Company (film rights; via 20th Century Studios)
- Years: 2004–present

Print publications
- Book: Books list

Films and television
- Film: Film series

Theatrical presentations
- Musical: Musical

Games
- Video game: Video games

Official website
- wimpykid.com (US) wimpykidclub.co.uk (UK)

Diary of a Wimpy Kid is an American illustrated children's novel series and media franchise created by author and cartoonist Jeff Kinney. The series follows Greg Heffley, a middle-schooler who illustrates his daily life in a diary (although he insists that it is a journal).

The characters of the book were first designed in 1998. Kinney spent eight years conceiving the first book before showing it to a publisher. In 2004, Funbrain and Kinney released an online version of Diary of a Wimpy Kid. The website made daily entries from September 2004 to June 2005. The online version had received almost 20 million views by 2009. Nonetheless, many online readers requested a printed version of the book. In February 2006, during the New York Comic Con, Kinney signed a multi-book deal with publisher Abrams Books to turn Diary of a Wimpy Kid into a printed book series. The first installment was released in April 2007 and received immediate success. In April 2009, Time magazine named Kinney in the Time 100 most influential people.

As of October 2026, the series consists of twenty-one main entries, with an average of 1 book released a year, as well as an activity book. A spin-off series centering on the character Rowley Jefferson has four installments as of 2026. The franchise was adapted into a film series produced by 20th Century Studios; the first four installments (2010-17) are live action, while subsequent ones (2021-present) are animated.

Since the release of the online version, most of the books have garnered positive reviews and commercial success. As of 2020, more than 250 million copies have been sold globally, making it the fourth best-selling book series of all time.

== Chronology ==
No.	Title	Date	ISBN
1	Diary of a Wimpy Kid	April 1, 2007	978-0-8109-9313-6
The introduction to the series focuses on the protagonist, Greg Heffley, and his various attempts to become popular in school.
2	Rodrick Rules	February 1, 2008	978-0-8109-9473-7
When his older brother Rodrick threatens to reveal an embarrassing incident from the previous summer, Greg must keep it under wraps while enduring Rodrick's tyrannical behavior.
3	The Last Straw	January 13, 2009	978-0-8109-7068-7
Greg's father, Frank, intends to send him to a military academy to instill discipline and diligence. Greg must persuade him to reconsider, while also trying to impress Holly Hills, his romantic interest.
4	Dog Days	October 12, 2009	978-0-8109-8391-5
Over summer vacation, Greg struggles with a boardwalk vacation, staying friends with Rowley, impressing a high school girl at the town pool, and coping with a new pet dog.
5	The Ugly Truth	November 9, 2010	978-0-8109-8491-2
As Greg embarks on a new school year, he must confront the challenges of adolescence, including changing dentists, attending a school lock-in, and learning about puberty.
6	Cabin Fever	November 15, 2011	978-1-4197-0223-5
The family is stranded in the house during a blizzard, while Greg fears that he will go to jail for accidentally vandalizing his school.
7	The Third Wheel	November 13, 2012	978-1-4197-0584-7
Greg tries to find a date for a school Valentine's Day dance, and he and Rowley end up both taking a girl named Abigail.
8	Hard Luck	November 5, 2013	978-1-4197-1132-9
Continuing from the last book, Abigail and Rowley form a romantic relationship, leaving Greg feeling isolated. As his situation deteriorates, he turns to a Magic 8-Ball to guide his decisions.
9	The Long Haul	November 4, 2014	978-1-4197-1189-3
The Heffleys go on a road trip over the summer.
10	Old School	November 3, 2015	978-1-4197-1701-7
Greg's mother petitions the town to not use electronics for a weekend. Later, to avoid his dad after accidentally ruining the car, Greg goes on a school field trip to an old-fashioned farm.
11	Double Down	November 1, 2016	978-1-4197-2344-5
Greg explores his creative talents by playing an instrument, making a movie with Rowley, and attending a wild Halloween party.
12	The Getaway	November 7, 2017	978-1-4197-2545-6
For the holiday season, the Heffleys board a plane to a tropical resort.
13	The Meltdown	October 30, 2018	978-1-4197-2743-6
In the winter, Greg and Rowley participate in a street-wide snowball fight.
14	Wrecking Ball	November 5, 2019	978-1-4197-3903-3
The Heffleys receive an inheritance from Greg's recently deceased great-aunt and use the money to renovate their house. When construction goes awry and Greg's school has its funding cut, the family looks for new houses to move into.
15	The Deep End	October 27, 2020	978-1-4197-4868-4
The Heffleys find themselves stranded at an RV park on a camping trip.
16	Big Shot	October 26, 2021	978-1-4197-4915-5
A disastrous field day at school prompts Greg to renounce athletic activities. However, his mom coerces him to try out for basketball. Greg is placed on a less than promising team, and it is up to him to lead them to victory.
17	Diper Överlöde	October 25, 2022	978-1-4197-6294-9
When he decides to tag along with his brother Rodrick's band, Löded Diper, Greg unwittingly embarks on a tour filled with late nights, uncompensated performances, internal conflicts, and financial challenges—typical components of the rock 'n' roll lifestyle.
18	No Brainer	October 24, 2023	978-1-4197-6694-7
Greg's middle school is on the brink of closure due to low test scores and funding cuts. Despite the principal's efforts, the situation remains dire. Greg and his classmates must raise their test scores to save their school.
19	Hot Mess	October 22, 2024	978-1-4197-6695-4
The secret behind Gramma's famous meatballs has been closely guarded for years, but it is threatened to be exposed as all of Greg's family's mysteries unravel in another wild Heffley vacation.
20	Partypooper	October 21, 2025	978-1-4197-8269-5
Greg is expecting a surprise birthday party, but it does not happen. Even worse, his whole family has forgotten it was his birthday and are guilted into throwing him a "blowout" party, which Greg plans to maximize for presents.
21	Fight or Flight	October 20, 2026	978-1-4197-8270-1
Greg and Rowley are forced to confront a bully and must navigate a situation that forces them to choose between fighting back or escaping.

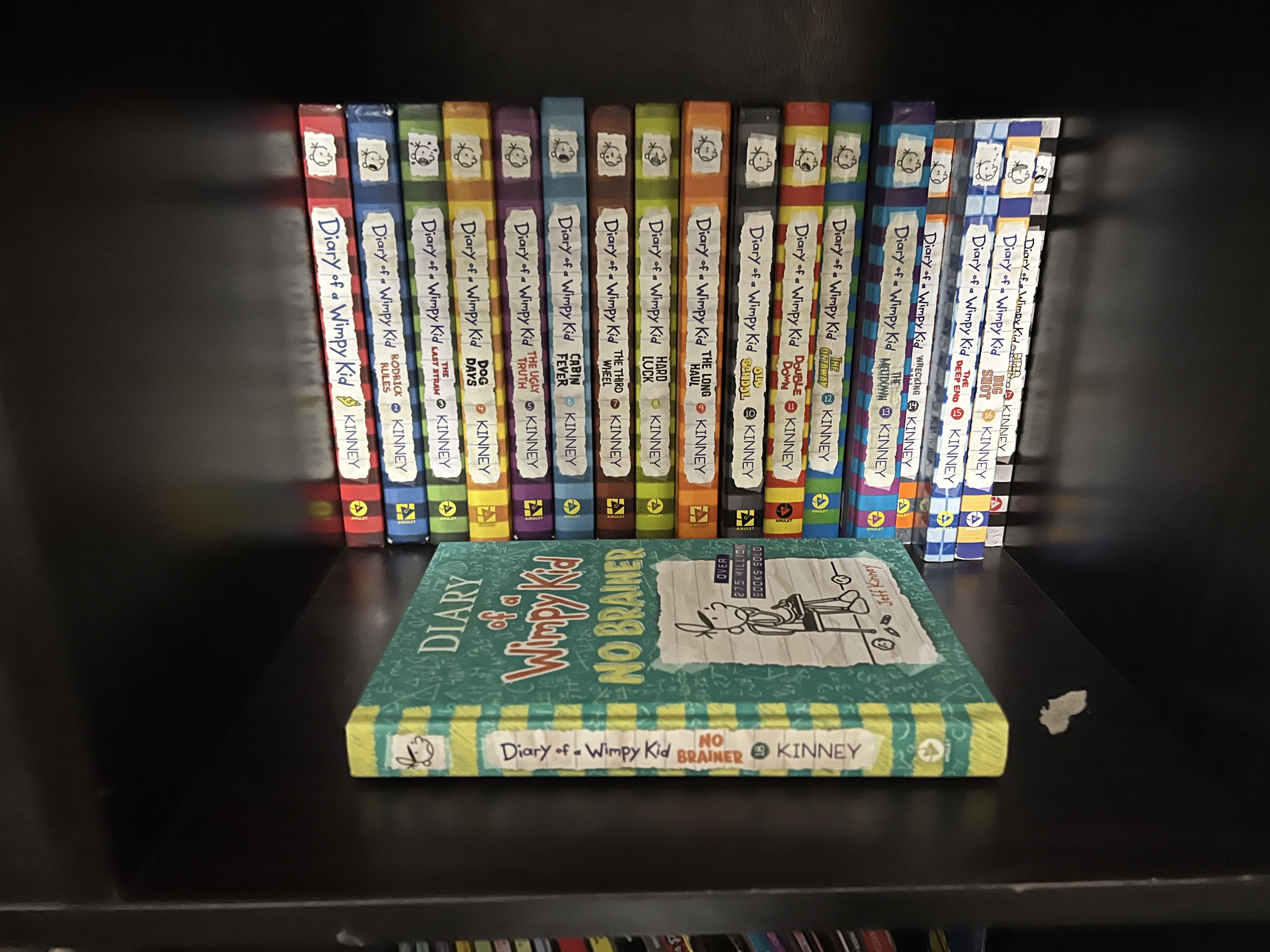
Books 1-18 of the main series. (USA version)

=== Supplementary books ===
- Diary of a Wimpy Kid Do-It-Yourself Book is an activity book that features a blank section encouraging readers to keep their own journal in the style of the books.
  - The Wimpy Kid Do-It-Yourself Book (published after the second edition of Wimpy Kid Movie Diary and before Cabin Fever) is the same book as the first Do-It-Yourself Book, but with 60 extra pages and 16 more full-color comics.
- The Wimpy Kid Movie Diary is a book about the making of the first film, which features stills and brand-new illustrations. Jeff Kinney dedicated the book to the film's main stars, Zachary Gordon and Robert Capron.
  - The Wimpy Kid Movie Diary: Now Includes The New Movie Rodrick Rules is an updated version of the first book, now featuring stills from the second film Rodrick Rules, more new illustrations, and information on how the second film was made.
  - The Wimpy Kid Movie Diary: The Story of All 3 Movies! is the second updated version of the first book, now adding stills from the third film Dog Days, and information on how this film was made.
- The Wimpy Kid Movie Diary: The Next Chapter covers how the film The Long Haul was made. It is dedicated to Jason Drucker, the actor who played Greg in that movie.

=== Spin-offs ===
A spin-off series has been published, written from Rowley's perspective. The first installment, Diary of an Awesome Friendly Kid: Rowley Jefferson's Journal, was released on April 9, 2019, and is a series of anecdotes about Greg and Rowley's friendship. The second, Rowley Jefferson's Awesome Friendly Adventure, is in the style of a fantasy adventure and was released on August 4, 2020. The book's original release date was April 7, 2020, but was delayed due to the COVID-19 pandemic. The third, Rowley Jefferson's Awesome Friendly Spooky Stories, was released on March 16, 2021. A sequel, titled Rowley Jefferson's Awesome Friendly Spooky Stories 2, was released on August 11, 2026.

=== Audiobooks ===
Audiobooks have been released for each main installment in the Diary of a Wimpy Kid series. The Recorded Books versions are read by Ramon de Ocampo, while the Penguin Books versions are read by Dan Russell, who has done so since The Third Wheel, and in 2018 he re-narrated the first 6 books for the markets where Penguin publish the series.

== Characters ==
- Greg Heffley is a middle school student, who is the main character and narrator of the series. He is an anti-hero, described by Kinney as "cocksure" and "misguided."
- Rowley Jefferson is Greg's good-natured best friend.
- Rodrick Heffley is Greg and Manny's older brother, who is rude, and the drummer in his band Löded Diper. He usually is noted for playing tricks on Greg.
- Manny Heffley is Greg and Rodrick's spoiled younger brother, who is known to be a tattletale.
- Susan Heffley is Greg's mother. She often embarrasses Greg.
- Frank Heffley is Greg's father. He always wants Greg to do sports and "to become a man," and doesn't like giving up.
- Gramma is Greg's maternal grandmother.
- Grandpa is Greg's paternal grandfather who is sometimes noted for irritating Greg.
- Fregley is Greg's odd neighbor and classmate.
- Holly Hills is Heather Hills' sister from The Last Straw.
- Meemaw is Greg's maternal great grandmother in Hard Luck, whose diamond ring was worn by her and has been used for three generations.

== Achievements ==
=== Awards and honors ===
Award	Category	Result
#1 New York Times Best Seller (812 weeks)		Won
2008 Nickelodeon Kids' Choice Awards	Favorite Book	Won
2009 Nickelodeon Kids' Choice Awards	Favorite Book	Nominated
ALA Notable Book		Won
2010 Nickelodeon Kids' Choice Awards	Favorite Book	Won
2010 Most Favorite Book Around the World		Won
2011 Nickelodeon Kids' Choice Awards	Favorite Book	Won
2012 Nickelodeon Kids' Choice Awards	Favorite Book	Won
2013 Nickelodeon Kids' Choice Awards	Favorite Book	Nominated
2014 Nickelodeon Kids' Choice Awards	Favorite Book	Won
2015 Nickelodeon Kids' Choice Awards	Favorite Book	Won
2016 Nickelodeon Kids' Choice Awards	Favorite Book	Won
2023 Nickelodeon Kids' Choice Awards	Favorite Book	Nominated

=== Commercial success ===
Diary of a Wimpy Kid was well received from The Princeton Review, Gold Card Association, The Dallas News, The TRR Editors, The NW Press, and The JJ Printing Company. The New York Times, which ranks children's serials collectively on a "Series Books" bestseller list, has included the Wimpy Kid series for 812 weeks as of October 14, 2024. USA Today, which ranks best sellers based on sales alone regardless of genre or intended audience, has listed Diary of a Wimpy Kid in its top 150, peaking at number 8, for 141 weeks as of April 4, 2010.

As of the same date, Rodrick Rules has been on the list for 117 weeks (peaking at number 4), The Last Straw has been on the list for 65 weeks (peaking at number 1), Dog Days has been on the list for all 25 weeks of its publication (peaking at number 1), and The Wimpy Kid Movie Diary has been listed for all three weeks of its publication, peaking at number 2.

The series has sold over 300 million books in 56 languages and 65 editions throughout the world. The series has also generated over $500 million in revenue.

== Media ==
=== Video games ===
On March 14, 2011, Jeff Kinney published a video game adaptation of Diary of the Wimpy Kid, entitled Wimpy Wonderland Island, to his online role-playing video game Poptropica as one of the main "island" levels, in which the player must problem-solve through game quest scenarios, centering on a problem that the player must resolve by going through multiple obstacles, collecting and using items, talking to various characters, and completing goals. On July 3, 2012, Kinney published a second game, entitled Wimpy Boardwalk Island.

=== Films ===
==== Live-action films ====
A film based on the first book was released on March 19, 2010. It was directed by Thor Freudenthal, who also directed Hotel for Dogs. The film starred Zachary Gordon as Greg, Robert Capron as Rowley (Greg's best friend), Steve Zahn as Frank (Greg's father), Rachael Harris as Susan (Greg's mother), Devon Bostick as Rodrick (Greg's older brother), Connor and Owen Fielding as Manny (Greg's younger brother), Chloë Grace Moretz as a new character named Angie, and Grayson Russell as Fregley.

The second film in the Diary of a Wimpy Kid film series, Diary of a Wimpy Kid: Rodrick Rules, was released on March 25, 2011, was based on the second book Rodrick Rules, with Zachary Gordon reprising his role as Greg Heffley. The film also contains some elements from The Last Straw within its plot.

The third film, Diary of a Wimpy Kid: Dog Days, combines the third and fourth books The Last Straw and Dog Days, taking stories from both, but mainly from Dog Days, from which it took its title. The decision to blend the two films was made to keep up with the ages of the actors. The film was released on August 3, 2012.

The likelihood of a fourth live-action film was slim. Kinney has announced the possibility for an animated film to be based on Diary of a Wimpy Kid: Cabin Fever as the next installment. In an interview for the book Hard Luck, Jeff Kinney stated he was working with Fox on a half-hour special of Cabin Fever, which was to be aired in late 2014, but as of 2021 no updates on the special have been announced. In September 2016, Jeff Kinney announced officially the production of a fourth film, Diary of a Wimpy Kid: The Long Haul, on his Twitter account. The film was released on May 19, 2017 and was based on The Long Haul.

==== Animated films ====
On August 6, 2019, Disney announced they would reboot Diary of a Wimpy Kid, Home Alone and Night at the Museum for their streaming service, Disney+. On December 10, 2020, Disney announced at their 2020 Investor's Day that an animated Diary of a Wimpy Kid film would be coming to Disney+ on December 3, 2021.

A second animated film, Diary of a Wimpy Kid: Rodrick Rules, was released to Disney+ on December 2, 2022.

A third animated film, Diary of a Wimpy Kid Christmas: Cabin Fever, was released to Disney+ on December 8, 2023.

A fourth animated film, Diary of a Wimpy Kid: The Last Straw, was released to Disney+ on December 5, 2025.

A fifth animated film, Diary of a Wimpy Kid Christmas: The Getaway, is set to release to Disney+ on December 4, 2026.

=== Musical ===
Diary of a Wimpy Kid: The Musical was produced by the Children's Theatre Company in 2016. The company staged a reworked version of the production in 2022. A studio album of songs from the show recorded by Broadway performers such as Sutton Foster and Norbert Leo Butz was released on December 14, 2023. Broadway Licensing Global offers licensing materials for professional and amateur productions of the musical.
