= Diary of a Wimpy Kid: The Third Wheel =

Book by Jeff Kinney

- Author: Jeff Kinney
- Illustrator: Jeff Kinney
- Language: English
- Series: Diary of a Wimpy Kid
- Genre: Children's
- Publisher: Amulet Books (US); Puffin Books (UK)
- Publication date: November 13, 2012; January 30, 2014 (Paperback re-issue)
- Publication place: United States
- Media type: Print (paperback, hardcover)
- Pages: 217
- ISBN: 978-1-4197-0584-7
- Preceded by: Cabin Fever
- Followed by: Hard Luck

Diary of a Wimpy Kid: The Third Wheel is a 2012 children's novel and the seventh book in the Diary of a Wimpy Kid series, written by American author Jeff Kinney. Kinney announced the book in March 2012, with The Third Wheel's cover revealed in May 2012. The book was released on November 13, 2012.

== Plot ==
Greg recalls several moments from his birth to his preschool years, including how his mother read to him before bed, how his parents' excessive kissing supposedly led to his premature birth, and his difficulties in learning how to walk. Greg explains some of the new parenting methods his mother, Susan has tried on Manny, his little brother, and how he has been affected by those methods, different from those of Greg.

Afterward, Greg decides to do chores when his Uncle Gary shows up at the front door. Uncle Gary explains how he was tricked into a “business opportunity of a lifetime” by a man in Boston and needs a place to stay while getting back up onto his feet, moving in before Greg's father, Frank, can object to the proposition.

As Uncle Gary struggles to adjust to life at Greg's home, the school prepares for a new student council election. Greg signs up for Rowley to be a member due to him having zero detentions. Greg starts a desperately extensive, disorganized voting campaign for Rowley, which proves useless as Rowley was the only one who signed up to be social chairperson. The student council decides on the next school fundraiser; one student suggested they do a mixed motocross and wrestling event, but that got rejected in favor of a Valentine's Day dance because the school did not allow motorized vehicles in the gym. Greg decides to attend but has difficulty finding a girl to accompany him, and he gives up after a while.

Then, a girl on the student council, Abigail Brown, is left alone after her boyfriend, Michael Sampson, has a family obligation. Greg tells Rowley to ask Abigail to go with them as a group of friends, to which she agrees, and Greg's idea is to use Rowley to get him a girlfriend so he can date her. Before the dance, the group goes out to dinner at Corny's, but Greg goes bankrupt after paying the bill.

At the dance, their night is ruined when senior citizens overrun their dance, claiming they reserved the dance area first, but they compromise things that ruin the theme, such as lights, no more music, and a partition halving the gym. Michael Sampson arrives with another girl, Cherie Bellanger, as the family obligation was a lie, leaving Abigail in tears. Greg attempts to comfort her; while dancing with her, he panics at the sight of what looked like chicken pox marks on her face, which turned out to be pimples when she was crying over Michael. She is left in tears, and Rowley comforts her on the ride home.

The book ends with Uncle Gary winning $40,000 from the local lottery and paying Frank with the money, thus being able to now move out of the house. Rowley and Abigail start dating, and Greg gets the chicken pox.

== Development ==
The title and cover of The Third Wheel were revealed in May 2012. The book had an initial printing of 6.5 million copies. Kinney commented that he enjoyed writing the book because "there's so much humor to be mined in the world of middle school romance."

== Reception ==
Critical and reader reception for The Third Wheel was positive, with the San Angelo Standard-Times calling the book "masterful."
