= Jeff Kinney =

American author (born 1971)

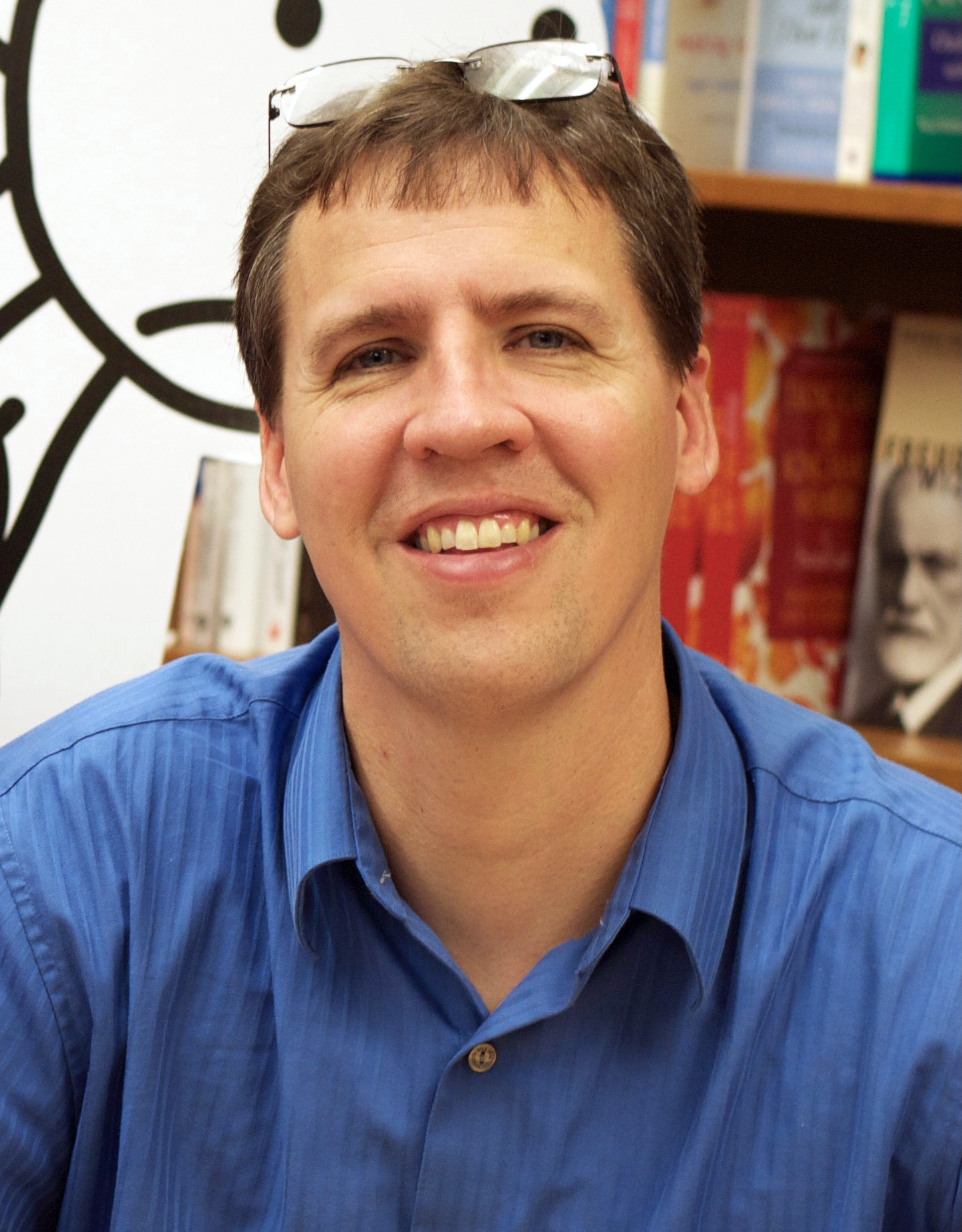
- Kinney in 2011
- Born: Jeffrey Patrick Kinney; February 19, 1971 (age 55); Fort Washington, Maryland, U.S.
- Education: University of Maryland, College Park (BA)
- Occupations: Author; illustrator; game designer; producer; actor
- Spouse: Julie Kinney (m. 2003)
- Children: 2
- Writing career
- Period: 1998–present
- Genres: Children's novels, realistic fiction, satire, comedy
- Subjects: Novels; films
- Notable works: Diary of a Wimpy Kid; Poptropica
- Jeff Kinney's voice Kinney talking about Diary of a Wimpy Kid, recorded 2023
- Website: wimpykid.com

Jeffrey Patrick Kinney (/ˈkɪni/ KIN-ee; born February 19, 1971) is an American author and illustrator. He is best known for creating, writing and illustrating the children's book series Diary of a Wimpy Kid. He also created the child-oriented website Poptropica.

== Early life ==
Kinney was born on February 19, 1971, in Fort Washington, Maryland, a Washington D.C. suburb. He was raised in Fort Washington, and attended Potomac Landing Elementary School and later Bishop McNamara High School, where he graduated in 1989. He has an older brother and sister, and a younger brother. He is of Irish descent.

He attended the University of Maryland, College Park, in the early 1990s. It was in college that Kinney created a popular comic strip, Igdoof, which ran in the school student newspaper, The Diamondback. Kinney graduated from the University of Maryland in 1993, originally majoring in computer science but switching to criminal justice in order to have more time to work on his comic. In 2021 he was inducted into Omicron Delta Kappa as an alumnus of the University of Maryland.

== Diary of a Wimpy Kid book series ==
In January 1998, Kinney conceived the idea of a middle-school wimp named Greg Heffley, who writes illustrated stories about his personal life. In May 2004, Funbrain and Jeff Kinney released an online version of the story, titled Diary of a Wimpy Kid. The website made daily entries from September of that year to June 2005. He worked on his book for almost eight years, before showing it to a publisher in New York City, U.S.

In February 2006, during the New York Comic Con, Kinney signed a multi-book deal with publisher Harry N. Abrams, Inc., to turn Diary of a Wimpy Kid into a print series.

The book became an instant hit, with the online version receiving about 20 million views as of 2007. When many online readers requested a printed version, Kinney agreed, and in April 2007, Diary of a Wimpy Kid was published. To date, 31 Wimpy Kid books have been released, including a tie-in book for the first film instalment entitled The Wimpy Kid Movie Diary, the Do-It-Yourself Book, and three spinoff books from the perspective of Greg's best friend Rowley Jefferson. In April 2009, TIME named Kinney one of The World's Most Influential People. In 2010, 2011, 2012, 2014, 2015, and 2016 the series won a Nickelodeon Kids Choice Award for Favorite Book. The series is still ongoing, with the latest mainstream book called Diary of a Wimpy Kid: Partypooper.

To promote the release of Diary of a Wimpy Kid: No Brainer, Kinney embarked on book tour across the West Coast of the United States titled "The No Brainer Show" from October 23 to November 8, 2023. Kinney dedicated the tour to libraries and librarians, making a personal donation of $100,000 for libraries along the tour. He also partnered with 11 publishers to acquire "high interest, diverse books to distribute to libraries and to kids we meet along the way". Each stop featured a game show hosted by Kinney, where participants could win prizes on behalf of their local library.

== Professional work ==
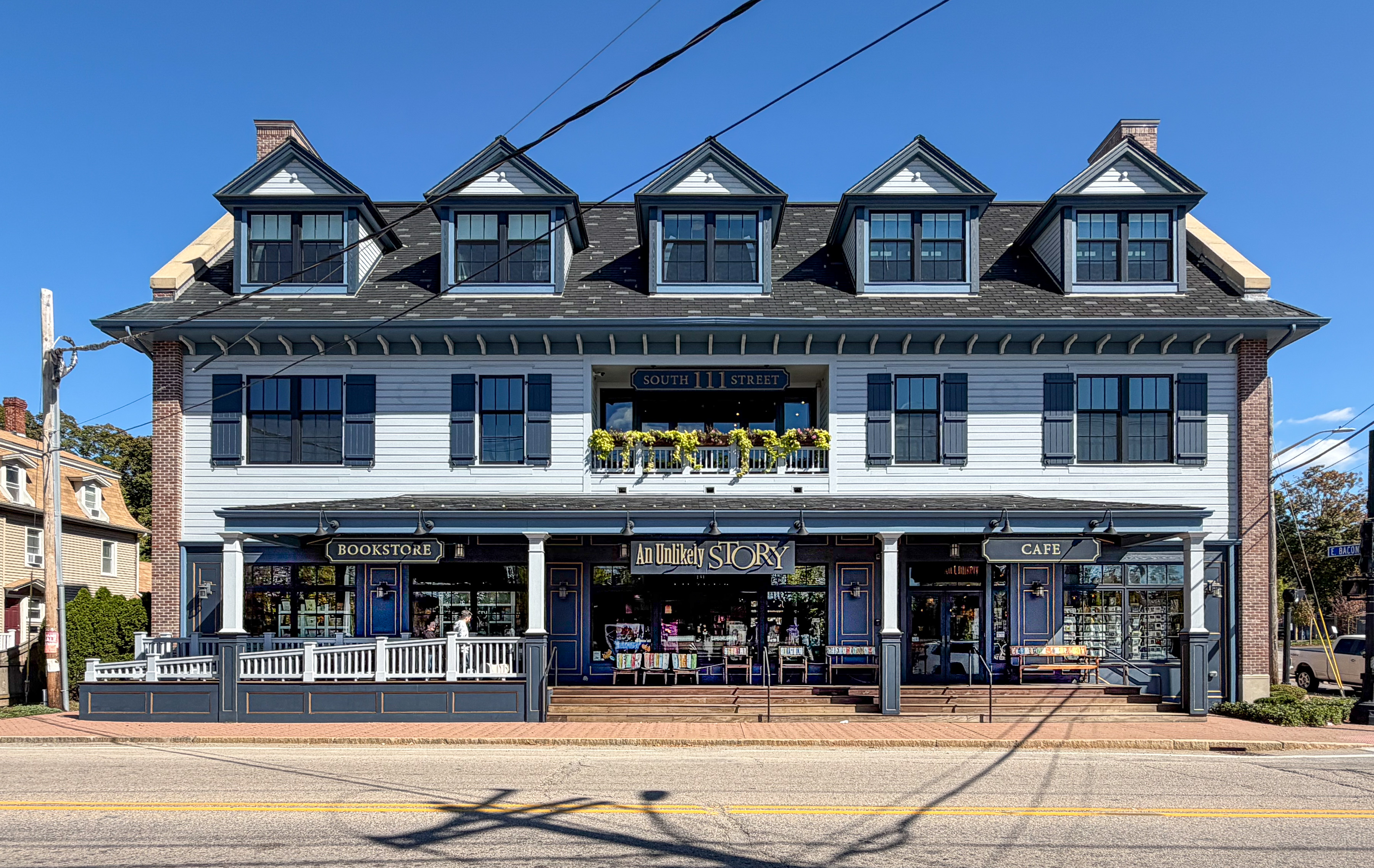
Kinney's "An Unlikely Story" bookstore and cafe in Plainville

Kinney works full-time as a writer and illustrator. He also created the kid-friendly website Poptropica which includes two islands called "Wimpy Wonderland" and "Wimpy Boardwalk", where the Diary of a Wimpy Kid characters and events are featured in the Poptropica universe.

Over 300 million copies of the Diary of a Wimpy Kid books have sold globally as of late 2025 and the series was developed into feature films for which Kinney served as executive producer.

In May 2015, Kinney and his wife Julie opened "An Unlikely Story," a local bookstore and cafe in Plainville, Massachusetts. Kinney advocates that kids should spend time reading as an alternative to screen time.

Kinney guest-hosted 10 episodes of the 10th season of WGBH local quiz bowl production High School Quiz Show while regular host Billy Costa was away on a special assignment. Kinney hosted the second half of the first-round games, the quarter-finals, and the semi-finals, while Costa hosted the first half of the first-round games and returned to Boston in time for the finals.

== Personal life ==
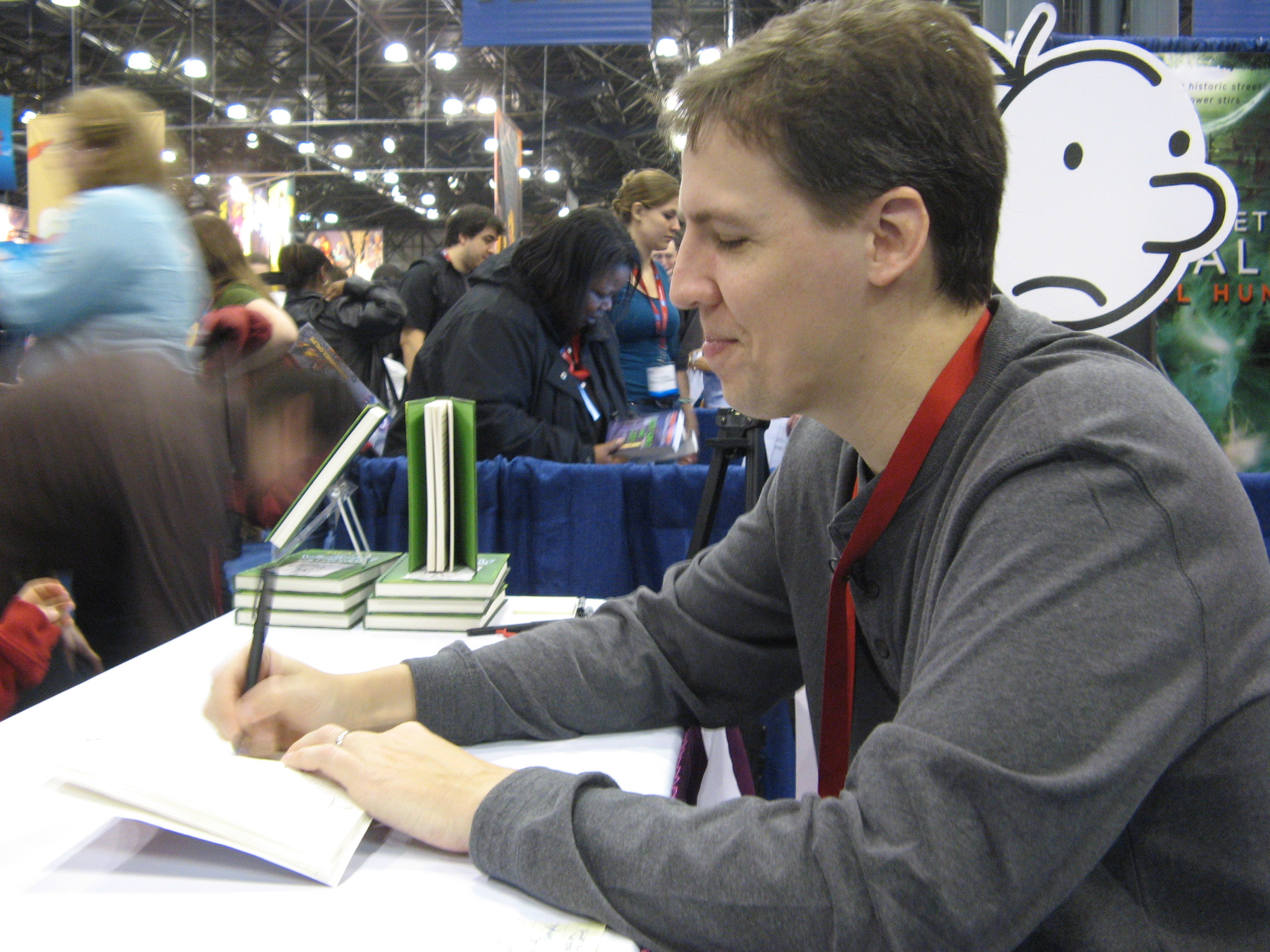
Kinney signing copies of Diary of a Wimpy Kid during an appearance at the 2009 New York Comic Con

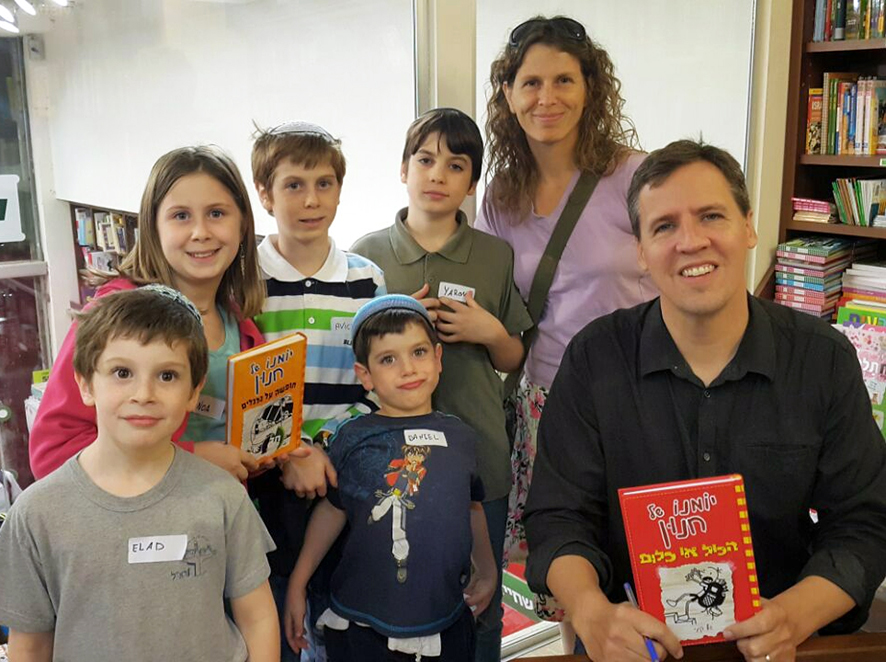
Kinney at a book signing event in Israel, 2016

On December 14, 2003, Jeff Kinney married Julie Kinney. They have two sons together. He is Catholic. Kinney moved to the New England area in 1995, and has resided in Plainville, Massachusetts since 2002. During his time there he has developed an interest in the local sports team such as the Boston Celtics. He has also collaborated with the Boston Red Sox as on April 18, 2026, the Red Sox held Diary of a Wimpy Kid night at Fenway Park with Kinney getting to throw out the ceremonial first pitch.

In June 2020, when Manny, a character he created in the Diary of a Wimpy Kid series, became an internet meme relating to the protests arising from the murder of George Floyd, Kinney, as a Black Lives Matter supporter, expressed a distaste for the sensation, stating, "I don't like it. I think that assigning a cartoon character to [the Black Lives Matter movement] trivializes it."

== Publications ==
=== Diary of a Wimpy Kid ===
1. Diary of a Wimpy Kid (April 1, 2007)
2. Diary of a Wimpy Kid: Rodrick Rules (February 1, 2008)
3. Diary of a Wimpy Kid: The Last Straw (January 13, 2009)
4. Diary of a Wimpy Kid: Dog Days (October 12, 2009)
5. Diary of a Wimpy Kid: The Ugly Truth (November 9, 2010)
6. Diary of a Wimpy Kid: Cabin Fever (November 15, 2011)
7. Diary of a Wimpy Kid: The Third Wheel (November 13, 2012)
8. Diary of a Wimpy Kid: Hard Luck (November 5, 2013)
9. Diary of a Wimpy Kid: The Long Haul (November 4, 2014)
10. Diary of a Wimpy Kid: Old School (November 3, 2015)
11. Diary of a Wimpy Kid: Double Down (November 1, 2016)
12. Diary of a Wimpy Kid: The Getaway (November 7, 2017)
13. Diary of a Wimpy Kid: The Meltdown (October 30, 2018)
14. Diary of a Wimpy Kid: Wrecking Ball (November 5, 2019)
15. Diary of a Wimpy Kid: The Deep End (October 27, 2020)
16. Diary of a Wimpy Kid: Big Shot (October 26, 2021)
17. Diary of a Wimpy Kid: Diper Överlöde (October 25, 2022)
18. Diary of a Wimpy Kid: No Brainer (October 24, 2023)
19. Diary of a Wimpy Kid: Hot Mess (October 22, 2024)
20. Diary of a Wimpy Kid: Partypooper (October 21, 2025)
21. Diary of a Wimpy Kid: Fight or Flight (October 20, 2026)

=== Rowley Jefferson ===
1. Diary of an Awesome Friendly Kid: Rowley Jefferson's Journal (April 9, 2019)
2. Rowley Jefferson's Awesome Friendly Adventure (August 4, 2020)
3. Rowley Jefferson's Awesome Friendly Spooky Stories (March 16, 2021)
4. Rowley Jefferson's Awesome Friendly Spooky Stories 2 (August 11, 2026)

=== Supplementary books ===
1. Diary of a Wimpy Kid Do-It-Yourself-Book (October 1, 2008)
2. The Wimpy Kid Movie Diary (Original: March 16, 2010, 1st Revised Edition: February 15, 2011, 2nd Revised Edition: June 26, 2012)
3. The Wimpy Kid Do-It-Yourself-Book (May 10, 2011)
4. Wimpy Kid Blank Journal (October 8, 2013)
5. Diary of a Wimpy Kid Writer's Notebook (October 8, 2013)
6. The Wimpy Kid Movie Diary: The Next Chapter (May 9, 2017)

== Film work and adaptations ==
Year	Film	Screenwriter	Producer	Actor	Role	Notes
2010	Diary of a Wimpy Kid (2010)	No	Executive	No	—N/a	Based on his novel "Diary of a Wimpy Kid"
2011	Diary of a Wimpy Kid: Rodrick Rules (2011)	No	Executive	Yes	Mr. Hills (Cameo)	Based on his novels "Diary of a Wimpy Kid: Rodrick Rules" and "Diary of a Wimpy Kid: The Last Straw"
2012	Diary of a Wimpy Kid: Dog Days	No	Executive	Yes	Mr. Hills	Based on his novels "Diary of a Wimpy Kid: The Last Straw" and "Diary of a Wimpy Kid: Dog Days"
2017	Diary of a Wimpy Kid: The Long Haul	Yes	Executive	Uncredited	Owner of a booth convention (cameo)	Based on his novel "Diary of a Wimpy Kid: The Long Haul"
2021	Diary of a Wimpy Kid (2021)	Yes	Yes	No	—N/a	Based on his novel "Diary of a Wimpy Kid"
2022	Diary of a Wimpy Kid: Rodrick Rules (2022)	Yes	Yes	No	—N/a	Based on his novel "Diary of a Wimpy Kid: Rodrick Rules"
2023	Diary of a Wimpy Kid Christmas: Cabin Fever	Yes	Yes	No	—N/a	Based on his novel "Diary of a Wimpy Kid: Cabin Fever"
2025	Diary of a Wimpy Kid: The Last Straw	Yes	Yes	No	—N/a	Based on his novel "Diary of a Wimpy Kid: The Last Straw"

The books have been adapted into a film series.

A film based on the first book was released on March 19, 2010. It was produced by 20th Century Fox and directed by Thor Freudenthal. The film starred Zachary Gordon as Greg Heffley, Robert Capron as Rowley Jefferson, Rachael Harris as Susan Heffley, Steve Zahn as Frank Heffley, Devon Bostick as Rodrick Heffley, Connor and Owen Fielding as Manny Heffley, Chloë Grace Moretz as a new character named Angie Steadman, Grayson Russell as Fregley, Laine MacNeil as Patty Farrell, and Karan Brar as Chirag Gupta.

A second film, based on Diary of a Wimpy Kid: Rodrick Rules, was released on March 25, 2011. Zachary Gordon returned as Greg Heffley. Steve Zahn (Frank Heffley) and Rachael Harris (Susan Heffley) also returned. The film was directed by David Bowers and the screenplay was written by Gabe Sachs and Jeff Judah. Some new cast members who appeared in the film included Peyton List as Holly Hills among others. Kinney himself appeared in the film in a cameo role as Holly's father. He would later reprise the role in the third film, Dog Days, which was released in 2012 and combines The Last Straw and Dog Days.

A fourth film, based on The Long Haul, was announced by Kinney via Twitter in April 2016. It was released on May 19, 2017, featuring an entirely new cast. Jeff Kinney also cameos in the film as the owner of a booth at a convention.
