= Diary of a Wimpy Kid: Diper Överlöde =

Book by Jeff Kinney

- Front cover
- Author: Jeff Kinney
- Illustrator: Jeff Kinney
- Series: Diary of a Wimpy Kid
- Genre: Children's literature Graphic novel
- Published: October 25, 2022
- Publisher: Amulet Books (US); Puffin Books (UK)
- Publication place: United States
- Pages: 224
- ISBN: 9781419762949
- Preceded by: Big Shot
- Followed by: No Brainer
- Website: Diper Överlöde

Diary of a Wimpy Kid: Diper Överlöde is the seventeenth book in the Diary of a Wimpy Kid series by Jeff Kinney. It was released on October 25, 2022. The story follows Greg Heffley as he reluctantly joins his brother Rodrick’s heavy metal band, Löded Diper.

== Plot ==
Greg talks about fame, thinking it would attract unwanted attention, so he decides to be best friends with someone who is possibly famous. After failed attempts to make his best friend Rowley famous, Greg decides to use his brother Rodrick's desire for his band, Löded Diper, to be famous as an opportunity instead, using a familial connection. Rodrick believes that the annual Battle of the Bands might boost their fame, inspired by his favorite band Metallichihuahua (based on Metallica), who won the competition when they were starting out, but broke up before he ever saw them play.

Rodrick attempts to have Löded Diper wear costumes that might establish them as rockstars, but that fails. After several photoshoots that also fail, the band joins a contest at a local car dealership, where the person who can keep at least one hand on a van the longest gets to keep it as their previous van was rear-ended. The band loses the competition, and they decide to use social media to promote themselves. After getting injured from recording videos of accidents that go viral, Löded Diper thinks about ideas for a music video, before realizing they need to record a song first to be able to create one.

Greg follows the band to a recording studio downtown, where they are able to finally record a song after several incidents and conflicts. The band then promotes their songs to local radio stations and people they know to no avail, before getting a breakthrough when bassist Drew's brother plays their song at the grocery store he works at; Drew's brother is fired from the grocery store as a result since the manager didn’t like heavy metal music, the type of music Löded Diper plays. Rodrick gets an ice cream truck from the junkyard, and Löded Diper blasts their music on the streets.

Rodrick decides to have the band perform on the rooftop of a building in the middle of the city, which Metallichihuahua had done once. Before they are able to start performing, the band flees down the building's stairs after panicking when grabbing the attention of a woman that lives at the apartment below the roof. They have a run-in with a cop, who fines them for parking in a loading zone. After some more marketing ideas, the band places stickers of their logo around town, catching the attention of the owner of a club named the Headless Chicken, who invites them to play at the club.

After preparing props, Löded Diper hires Greg as a roadie. On the performance's night, Greg and band vocalist Bill sneak into a nearby pizza place to steal an animatronic's drumstick for Rodrick. The show ends in disaster, and the owner reveals that the band isn't getting paid for the performance in the first place. Later on, they visit a convention to meet Metallichihuahua guitarist Warwick Sprinter, who gives them advice and explains that his band broke up because of desperate attempts to recover money stolen by their manager.

Löded Diper performs at a bar mitzvah successfully before being hired for some more shows and Rodrick considers growing the group's fan base. They head to a festival and sell merch, where they perform to a small audience, which includes Greg and Rodrick's family. The band later visits Metallichihuahua drummer Sebastian Sleeves, who tells them to quit the music business due to the tiny chance of getting famous. They later find out about a more successful competing band named Stank, inspiring Rodrick to be more strict on Löded Diper's preparations.

Bill falls in love with a restaurant assistant manager named Becky, who brings the group donuts during practice. After Rodrick makes Bill break up with her, to the latter's dismay, the group receives a cease and desist letter from a trading card company, which owns a card named Loaded Diaper. Not wanting to risk going into an expensive legal fight, the other members leave the band, and Bill joins Stank. Greg, Drew's brother, and Rodrick's friend Ward replace them, but practicing for them is hard.

On the day of the competition, Rodrick plugs his music player into a speaker and Löded Diper mimics their performance, but fail when they realize Rodrick has played the wrong audio, as it was too late to switch to the right audio. Suddenly, Sebastian, Warwick, and their former bandmates Stewart and Wayne get up on stage and start arguing. Metallichihuahua ends up performing and winning the competition before reuniting, and afterward Bill rejoins Löded Diper.

== Reception ==
Common Sense Media gave the book 4 out of 5 stars.

== Sequel ==
A sequel, titled Diary of a Wimpy Kid: No Brainer, was released in October 2023.
