= Diary of a Wimpy Kid: Big Shot =

Book by Jeff Kinney

- North American cover
- Author: Jeff Kinney
- Illustrator: Jeff Kinney
- Series: Diary of a Wimpy Kid
- Genre: Children's literature Graphic novel
- Published: 2021
- Publisher: Amulet Books (US); Puffin Books (UK)
- Publication date: October 26, 2021; January 17, 2023 (paperback)
- Publication place: United States
- Pages: 224
- ISBN: 978-1419749155
- Preceded by: The Deep End
- Followed by: Diper Överlöde
- Website: https://wimpykid.com/books/book16/

Diary of a Wimpy Kid: Big Shot is the sixteenth book in the Diary of a Wimpy Kid series by Jeff Kinney. It was released on October 26, 2021. The story follows Greg Heffley as he reluctantly signs up for basketball. It received generally positive reviews and was a best-seller for several weeks following its release.

== Plot ==
The book starts with Greg reminiscing about his bad experience with sports and why he quit them, as he and sports don’t mix. After learning about a Sports Day at school, where the winning homeroom gets a Friday off, he decides to train for the upcoming event. He attempts to go to the gym with his father, Frank, but they are both kicked out due to Greg making too much noise in there.

Sports Day turns out to be a large disaster, as teachers trade students to give them an advantage, and students are paid to fail in the game, and ultimately, the lunch staff wins a Friday off. Due to the janitors having to take care of lunch, the principal is forced to give everyone a Friday off. Greg is sluggish after the catastrophe, but his mom, Susan, encourages him to give sports one more try, so he reluctantly signs up for basketball.

He performs terribly at tryouts, but he manages to land a spot on one of the town’s teams, with coach Mr. Patel, along with his son Preet, who is incredibly skilled at the sport onto the team as well, and had missed tryouts due to his uncle's funeral. Mr. Patel created a team with the kids who were cut from tryouts so his son would be able to play. The team has difficulties practicing, and their court is rented out by another club. Things only get worse when Preet breaks his ankle at practice, deeming him out for the season.

The team plays at another school in Slacksville, a town that Greg's town has had a long rivalry with, in which Slacksville beats Greg's team 101-2, and Mr. Patel and the team, including Greg, are discouraged from playing again. Susan decides to reorganize the team and gives them a new name, the Huskies, which is later renamed Winter Dogs, and she becomes the coach, but uses strange techniques for practicing.

She introduces them to the Second Chance Tournament, a state-wide tournament you cannot leave until you win. The Winter Dogs are unable to win a single game until there are only two teams, where they realize one team will not be able to win, making it the worst in the state. The game is rough, with the opposing team, the Funky Dunkers, also being terrible in play. In the middle of the game, Mr. Patel arrives with Preet, who is given the chance to play in the game with a boot on his right foot, which he happily accepts.

During the game, one of the Funky Dunkers' members sprains his leg when Preet unintentionally steps on it with his boot, putting them at a disadvantage. They initially decide to forfeit, but Susan wants the game to be fair for everyone, and she trades Greg to the other team, telling him that she is his "secret weapon"; Greg realized that she traded him because he stunk and knew that he would blow off the other team. At the last second, he accidentally makes a backwards half-court 3-pointer, letting the Funky Dunkers win, establishing the Winter Dogs as the worst team in the state. The book ends with Greg and the Funky Dunkers celebrating their victory by going to an ice cream parlor, while Susan and the Winter Dogs return home.

== Development ==
Big Shot was first teased by Jeff Kinney in April 2020 through Twitter. In a response to a fan letter, he confirmed that he was writing both a fifteenth and sixteenth book. The title and cover were later revealed on May 27, 2021.

The cover of Big Shot depicts Greg with mismatched equipment from multiple different sports. According to Kinney, this was a design choice to communicate that the story was about sports in general, rather than only basketball. After the release of the book, Kinney said it took him several weeks to write the first sentence of the book.

== Reception ==
Common Sense Media gave the book 4 out of 5 stars.
