= Diary of a Wimpy Kid: The Last Straw =

Novel by Jeff Kinney

- US cover
- Author: Jeff Kinney
- Illustrator: Jeff Kinney
- Language: English
- Series: Diary of a Wimpy Kid
- Genre: Comedy
- Publisher: Amulet Books (US); Puffin Books (UK)
- Publication date: January 13, 2009; August 6, 2011 (paperback re-issue)
- Publication place: United States
- Pages: 218
- ISBN: 978-0-8109-7068-7
- Preceded by: Rodrick Rules
- Followed by: Dog Days

Diary of a Wimpy Kid: The Last Straw is a novel written by American author and cartoonist Jeff Kinney, the third book in the Diary of a Wimpy Kid series. The book acts as a journal and follows the adventures of Greg Heffley, the narrator of the book, who is in the second half of his seventh-grade year. This book was released in the US on January 13, 2009.

An animated film based on the book released on Disney+ on December 5, 2025.

== Plot ==
The book begins on New Years Day, with Greg discussing his family's New Year's resolutions. Life becomes harder for Greg and his best friend Rowley when their school bus route is "rezoned" to the Whirley Street neighborhood, so they must walk over a quarter of a mile to get to and from school.

Greg also deals with being compared to his father Frank's boss's sons, who all play sports and always seem outside exercising, so Frank is jealous of that. After conflicts over Greg wanting to stay inside and watch TV on Saturdays and Frank stealing his school snacks, Frank makes him sign up for intramural soccer after an incident at church on Easter.

At first, Greg rides the bench, but he becomes the starting goalie when the primary goalie, Tucker Fox, is injured. During a game, Greg takes a break to pick dandelions on the field, ultimately making his team lose; when Frank's boss, Mr. Warren, shows him the paper of his son, Frank is embarrassed by it.

After this, Frank runs into a former neighborhood troublemaker named Lenwood Heath at the movie theater, who has reformed after going to military school. Impressed with his former enemy's turnaround, Frank decides to sign Greg up for a summer program at Spag Union Military Academy, which Lenwood attended, hoping Greg will change for the better, but mostly hoping this will end the embarrassment.

Greg joins the Boy Scouts to impress his dad and avoid Spag Union, which also allows him to quit soccer. However, he gets sick and misses their camping trip, which Frank has to go to anyway (because he agreed to be a chaperone), and has a terrible time. Later, when Greg, Frank, and Rodrick have a camping "do-over", they end up at a hotel after heavy rain, where Rodrick locks Greg out of their room in his underwear.

After this, Greg becomes more willing to attend Spag Union, and focuses on impressing his crush, Holly Hills, before he leaves. He goes to the roller rink with Rowley, knowing Holly will be there, but when he approaches her, she confuses him for Fregley, making Greg loses interest in Holly. But on Saturday, what he thinks is his only day of summer vacation, Greg unintentionally saves Frank from making a fool of himself at the Snella's half-birthday party for their baby.

The next day, Frank decides not to send Greg to Spag Union, which Greg thinks is because he had saved Frank from embarrassment yesterday. The book ends with Greg looking forward to his summer vacation.

== Reception ==
The Last Straw received positive reviews. Positive attention was once again given to the character of Greg Heffley, with him being considered relatable. The books' style of deadpan humor was also well received.

== Adaptations ==
=== Live-action film ===
On August 3, 2012, a film based on this book, The Last Straw, as well as the subsequent book, Dog Days, was released; the movie starred Zachary Gordon, Steve Zahn, Robert Capron, Devon Bostick, Rachael Harris, Peyton List, Grayson Russell and Karan Brar. Principal photography began on August 8, 2011, in Vancouver and was completed on October 7, 2011. A poster was leaked in March 2012. A teaser trailer was attached to The Three Stooges. An advance screening for the film was held on July 31, 2012.

=== Animated film ===
In December 2022, Kinney confirmed an adaptation of The Last Straw was in the works for Disney+. The film, Diary of a Wimpy Kid: The Last Straw, released on December 5, 2025.
