= Diary of a Wimpy Kid: The Deep End =

Book by Jeff Kinney

- U.S. cover
- Author: Jeff Kinney
- Illustrator: Jeff Kinney
- Series: Diary of a Wimpy Kid
- Genre: Children's literature Graphic novel
- Published: October 27, 2020; January 20, 2022 (paperback re-issue)
- Publisher: Amulet Books (US); Puffin Books (UK)
- Publication place: United States
- Pages: 224
- ISBN: 978-1419748684
- OCLC: 1199337733
- Preceded by: Wrecking Ball
- Followed by: Big Shot
- Website: https://wimpykid.com/books/book15/

Diary of a Wimpy Kid: The Deep End is the 15th book in the Diary of a Wimpy Kid series by Jeff Kinney. It was published on October 27, 2020. The story follows protagonist Greg Heffley and his family as they vacation in a recreational vehicle (RV). It received many positive reviews and was a best-seller for several weeks following its release. The book was promoted with a pool-party themed drive-through event. The book was created during the COVID-19 pandemic, which influenced the writing.

== Plot ==
Greg Heffley and his family have been living in his grandmother's basement for two months following the events of Wrecking Ball, and they are beginning to go stir crazy. The Heffleys cannot afford an expensive vacation, but they discuss possible family vacations that they can afford. Unable to reach a decision, Greg's family receives a call from Greg's great-grandmother Gammie, asking them to take his uncle's camper out of her driveway. The family realizes that they can vacation in the camper and not have to spend money at restaurants and hotels.

After buying supplies and cleaning the camper, the family takes off on the road, making several stops, arriving at a fish hatchery they unknowingly swim in, an activity center, and a National Forest.

Greg's mother, Susan wants to stay in a place where there are more people, so they pay to spend a week at a luxury RV campground. Greg explores the grounds, seeing the showers, swimming pool, and the "deluxe" campsites, where people have satellite dishes and even lawns that they tend to.

The following day, the Heffleys go canoeing in the site's lake, where teenagers slingshot watermelons at them. Greg meets a group of boys, led by a kid named "Juicebox", that have been going to the campsite for years. They get along, and the boys show him how they have fun at camp. Later, the teenagers that pester the Heffleys by launching watermelons at the boys. Juicebox reveals the boys' plan to ambush the teens by spraying them with water guns. They act on their plan but have to hide when the teenagers chase them. The boys refill their squirt guns, this time with ketchup, mustard, and soda, and spray the teens again, attracting bees to them, which sting them. The boys run off and hide, victorious in their plan.

The next day, Greg finds out that the other boys, with the exception of "Regular Marcus", were caught by the camp director, who forced them to clean the snack shack with toothbrushes. Juicebox attempts to pin the blame on Greg, but the director is unable to find him.

The family goes swimming in the camp's pool but has to leave when lightning starts to flash. They soon learn that the bridge leading in and out of the grounds was struck by lightning and is now inaccessible, so campers start to get desperate and rowdy, raiding the camp store, stealing water from the showers, and even tipping RVs. Not wanting to stay any longer, the Heffleys decide to drive over the river that flows under the bridge. However, they get washed downstream, where Manny snaps the camper snugly into the missing area of the bridge before firing off a flare. The rest of the campers drive over the top of the Heffley's RV, leaving the family alone at the camp. With the place to themselves, they can enjoy their last day at the campground, having fun at the lake and eating better meals than they had all trip. Greg reflects on making a few happy memories, but he wishes he didn't have to go through as much drama as he did.

== Promotion ==
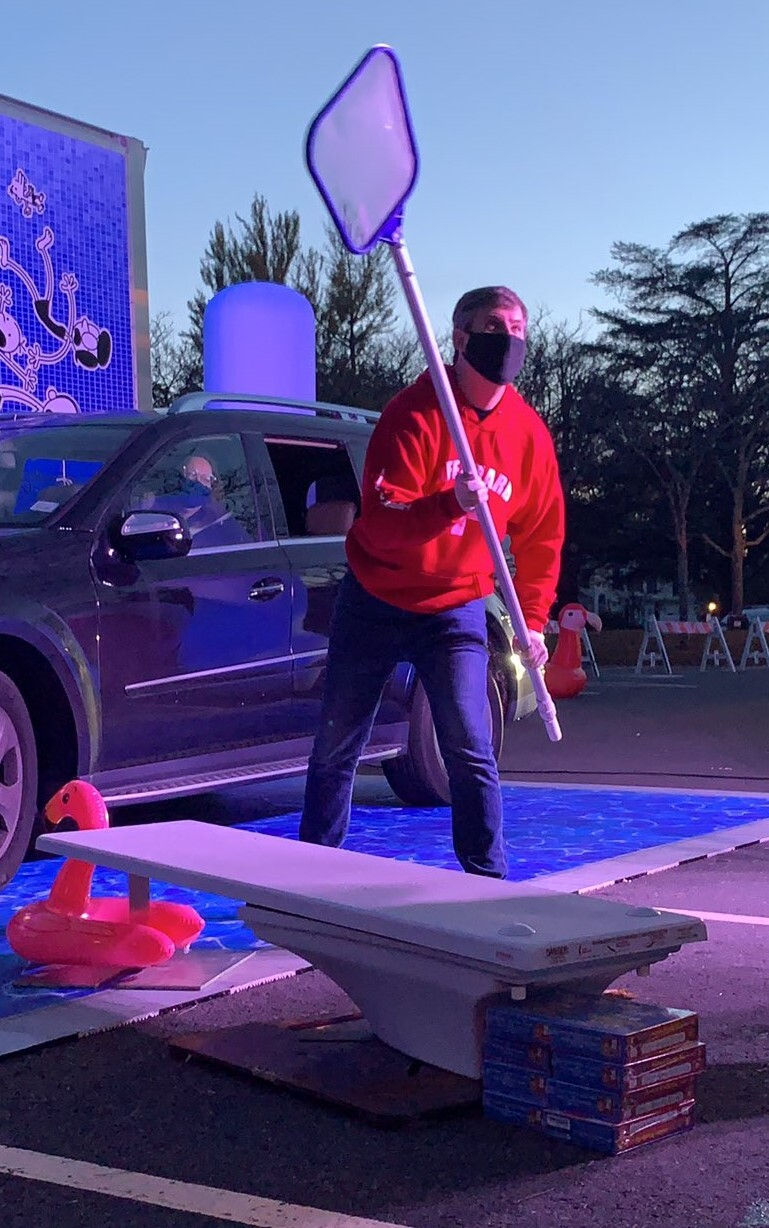
Jeff Kinney launches a water balloon at a car (not pictured) at a promotional event for The Deep End.

Due to the COVID-19 pandemic, a book tour to promote the story had to be significantly different than those in the past to ensure social distancing and other safety protocols. Starting on October 25, Kinney toured with an interactive, pool party-themed drive-through event. Attendees could engage in several activities, all from their vehicle, including shooting water balloons from a slingshot, squirting water guns, and tossing balls at a dunk tank holding a lifeguard. Kinney used a six-foot-long pool skimmer to give signed copies of The Deep End to kids that went to these events. Before ultimately deciding to tour as he did, Kinney also considered hosting drive-in movie events to promote the book. However, when other authors chose to advertise their books like that, he decided against it, wanting to do something that nobody had ever tried before. Kinney, partnered with Scholastic, also held a virtual event after the book released. In the event, he showed viewers how to draw certain characters, held a Q&A, was dumped in a dunk tank, and hosted a few other activities. On November 4, 2020, the official Diary of a Wimpy Kid YouTube account released a promotional video for the book. It depicted several characters from the series on an online video-chat call, with Greg saying, "Finally, something fun," as the cover was shown at the end of the clip.

== Background ==
A teaser image with the release date was revealed on February 13, 2020. The book's title and cover were revealed on May 26, 2020. As Kinney began writing the book, lockdowns for the COVID-19 pandemic had already taken place around the world, and he knew that he would have to write "a different kind of book". He wanted to acknowledge lockdown living without making the book too serious, so he had the Heffley family live in their grandmother's basement, due to their house needing home repairs. According to Kinney, several events he has experienced while camping inspired sections of the book. On July 30, Kinney tweeted a drawing of a map of the RV park in the book. He said that designing places that do not exist is a fun part of his job and that maps such as the one he shared "help make the story real" for him. The book was released on October 27, 2020.

== Reception ==
Kirkus Reviews said that The Deep End is "paced perfectly with witty lines, smart gags, and charming cartoons." Carrie R. Wheadon of Common Sense Media found the book "funny but predictable" and gave it three out of five stars. Pluggedin found that the book was "really good fun" and praised it for its focus on "how a loving family can find fun and togetherness in the midst of the troubles of life."

=== Sales ===
USA Today reported The Deep End as the 12th best selling book of 2020. Over 171,000 copies of The Deep End were sold in the first week of its release in the United States, and it was the top-selling book that week. It was listed on every USA Today's best sellers of the week list from its release through December 31.
