= Diary of a Wimpy Kid: Hard Luck =

2013 book by Jeff Kinney

- First edition hardcover
- Author: Jeff Kinney
- Illustrator: Jeff Kinney
- Language: English
- Series: Diary of a Wimpy Kid
- Genre: Children's
- Publisher: Amulet Books (US); Puffin Books (UK)
- Publication date: November 5, 2013; January 29, 2015 (paperback re-issue)
- Publication place: United States
- Media type: Print (paperback, hardcover)
- Pages: 217
- ISBN: 978-1-4197-1132-9
- Preceded by: The Third Wheel
- Followed by: The Long Haul

Diary of a Wimpy Kid: Hard Luck is a children's novel written by Jeff Kinney and the eighth book in the Diary of a Wimpy Kid series. It was released on November 5, 2013. In this book, Greg's best friend Rowley ditches him, and Greg struggles to make new friends. On Easter, he finds a Magic 8 Ball and attempts to change his luck by using it to make decisions for him at school. Hard Luck received generally positive reviews from critics and was the bestselling book of 2013.

== Plot ==
The story begins with Greg recalling his mother, Susan's words that "friends will come and go, but family is forever". Greg agrees with that statement, as Rowley has been refusing to hang out with him and agreeing with everything Abigail, his girlfriend, says since they started going out. Getting bored without Rowley, Greg takes his mother's advice to "branch out" and meet the other kids in his neighborhood, so he chooses to become friends with his strange neighbor, Fregley. After Greg tries to get him to be funny during lunch, Fregley becomes popular with other students when they discover he can "chew" food with his belly button.

After school, Greg's mother, Susan, announces that her extended family will come to town for Easter. Greg talks about Meemaw, his deceased great grandmother, who organized egg hunts in the backyard. On Easter, the family notices a difference between photos in an album, where an image of Meemaw putting objects in eggs depicts her wearing a diamond ring, but she is not wearing it in a later photograph, realizing she hid her ring in an Easter egg. They rush to find it, although the search is unsuccessful; Susan hopes nobody locates it, fearing someone will sell the ring for money and divide the family.

On Easter, Greg finds a Magic 8 Ball toy under Rodrick's bed. He uses it to make decisions at home and joins the Yearbook Club at his middle school. The next day, while taking a true or false Social Studies test, Greg accidentally drops his Magic 8 Ball, breaking it, and getting caught cheating while doing so. At school, Greg is called to take yearbook photos of Fregley (Most Popular) and Rowley and Abigail (Cutest Couple), which causes him to resign from his position.

Finding it useless, Greg throws his Magic 8 Ball into his grandmother's yard. After finding out Rowley and Abigail broke up, Greg wonders if he and Rowley should be friends again. On the way home from school, hoping it is still functional, he returns to the Magic 8 Ball. As he is about to shake it, he notices the plastic egg with Meemaw's diamond ring. He is worried that, as Susan predicts, his family will start fighting over the ring, so he hides it in Susan's closet.

Greg concludes that he has to make big decisions alone, and he and Rowley reconcile. He writes, "I know Mom's always saying that friends come and go and family is forever, and maybe that's true. [...] I'm sure Rowley and I will get in another fight somewhere down the road, and then we'll go through this drama again. But for now, we're good."

== Background ==
Teaser artwork for Hard Luck, depicting Greg Heffley holding an umbrella while Magic 8 Balls fall around him, was released in March 2013. On August 8, 2013, the book's cover and official title, Hard Luck, were revealed, along with the release date of November 5, 2013. Author and illustrator of Hard Luck, Jeff Kinney, also announced that he would begin a tour that same month to encourage pre-sales of the book.

Kinney later stated that he found it challenging to write for one of the book's characters, Rowley's girlfriend Abigail, as she was "meant to be a placeholder for a girlfriend rather than a fully developed character" and that "[i]t was a little tricky trying to figure out how to write for a character that hardly has any dialogue and not much of a personality. She's just a stand-in for a threat to Greg's and Rowley's friendship."

On the subject of the book's cover, Kinney stated that he chose the color green because the book takes place in spring and "the green in the Irish flag symbolizes the luck of the Irish."

== Reception ==
Hard Luck sold 1.3 million its first week. It was the number one print bestseller of 2013, with over 3 million copies sold. However, it failed to reach the top 20 in eBook sales. Hard Luck had first printings of 5.5 million copies in the United States and 800,000 copies in the United Kingdom.

Hard Luck received generally positive reviews from critics. Booklist commented that "Kinney strikes his comic target in the bull’s-eye, exaggerating the trials of adolescence just enough to make them real while deftly exposing the insecurities behind Greg’s bravado with his super, simple drawings." Publishers Weekly wrote that the book's formula was similar to Kinney's prior books and that fans of the series would likely enjoy this one as well. Common Sense Media criticized the book for its use of toilet humour and gave it three out of five stars. The Guardian gave the book a score of four out of five and described it as "hilarious."

Irish Independent praised the book for its "laugh-out-loud scenes," such as when Greg worries about "get[ting] baked alive like a microwave burrito." They liked the book for "reflect[ing] children's real experiences," particularly "[t]he scenes where Greg struggles in school without a friend" for being "poignantly written" and that "Greg's predicament [about his family members fighting over Meemaw's ring] will resonate with all children (and their parents)." The reviewer concludes by calling Hard Luck "one of the funniest books I've read all year."
