= Diary of a Wimpy Kid: Fight or Flight =

2026 children's book by Jeff Kinney

- Author: Jeff Kinney
- Illustrator: Jeff Kinney
- Language: English
- Series: Diary of a Wimpy Kid
- Genre: Children's literature, Graphic novel, Comedy
- Publisher: Amulet Books
- Publication date: October 20, 2026
- Publication place: United States
- Pages: 224
- ISBN: 978-1-4197-8270-1
- Preceded by: Partypooper

Diary of a Wimpy Kid: Fight or Flight is the 21st book in the Diary of a Wimpy Kid series written and illustrated by Jeff Kinney. The sequel to Partypooper, it was published by Amulet Books on October 20, 2026.

== Plot ==
Greg Heffley keeps a secret binder filled with notes on his middle school's biggest bullies and strategies for avoiding them. When the binder falls into the wrong hands, Greg becomes a target and must decide whether to confront the situation or try to escape it.

== Development ==
In an interview with Publishers Weekly, Kinney discussed writing about bullying in a humorous way while trying not to make light of the subject.

== Reception ==
Kirkus Reviews described Fight or Flight as a series entry that "follows familiar beats and will be welcomed by its huge fan base." Common Sense Media gave the book three out of five stars, noting that the book tackles bullying while keeping the tone light and rated it appropriate for ages 9 and up. Shortly after release, the book topped library holds lists according to School Library Journal.
