= Diary of a Wimpy Kid: Wrecking Ball =

2019 children's novel by Jeff Kinney

- First edition hardcover
- Author: Jeff Kinney
- Illustrator: Jeff Kinney
- Language: English
- Series: Diary of a Wimpy Kid
- Genre: Children's
- Publisher: Amulet Books (US); Puffin Books (UK)
- Publication date: November 9, 2019
- Publication place: United States of America
- Media type: Print (paperback, hardcover)
- Pages: 224
- ISBN: 9781419739033
- Preceded by: The Meltdown
- Followed by: The Deep End

Diary of a Wimpy Kid: Wrecking Ball is the 14th book in the Diary of a Wimpy Kid series by Jeff Kinney. The story focuses on Greg; his mother, Susan; his father, Frank; and his best friend, Rowley; as the Heffley family renovate their house and prepare to move to a new neighborhood. It was released on November 5, 2019.

== Plot ==
In March, Greg goes through his closet for spring cleaning day and recalls various objects from his childhood, and then has a yard sale to sell them. He hires Rowley, his best friend, to make sure nothing is stolen. When it starts raining, Greg's objects on sale are ruined, and he sells nothing.

Greg's Great Aunt Reba passes away, and after a family meeting, Susan chooses to spend the inheritance money on expanding their house's kitchen, vetoing the other Heffleys' other ideas on how to spend the money. To prepare for the construction, Frank teaches Greg how to do chores around the house. Greg is worried that a monster is in the plumbing while trying to unclog the drain, due to his parents mentioning the large quantities of grout in their bathroom, which led Greg's imagination to believe there was a monster lurking in the plumbing system. When Greg is told to paint around his family's hot tub, he discovers a wasp's nest, which Rodrick sprays with the hose. While cleaning the gutters, the ladder falls, and Greg is stuck on the roof, until he climbs through the master bathroom window above the garage roof. Susan hires professional workers, and Frank decides to send Greg outside to help them. Greg argues that it would ruin the quality of his "buttery" hands, but Frank ignores him and sends him outside to help. Initially, Greg believes the workers showed him too little respect, due to the fact they were playing pranks on him. Outside, Greg tries to make himself more important on the construction site, by doing tasks to help the workers. A fight starts when Greg accidentally ruins one of the worker's lunch deliveries, so Greg leaves.

Greg is worried due to a school-wide test that determines important decisions around his school, such as teacher's salaries and the replacement of core subjects. He says that problems are arising at home, including that a large hole has been cut in the side of the house, revealing an infestation of wasps and mice. The recently built extension to the house had been demolished due to it being too close to a neighbor's house, and the rest of the inheritance money is spent on fixing the hole. Later, Susan tells Greg that his school's funding is being cut due to low scores on the test; a kid let the stress lizard (which was put in to decrease stress levels of the students), out of its cage, causing panic throughout the school. Susan suggests that they move to a new school district to improve Greg's education, which Greg is excited about, but he is worried about leaving Rowley behind. The Heffleys tour a possible future house, which has a big kitchen, a swimming pool, and more, and they like and want to buy the house. They successfully sell their house, when another family chooses to buy it, provided that the hot tub is removed.

The day after Greg tries to explain his departure to Rowley, he sees that more work is being done on his house, and the Heffleys rush to remove their belongings after Susan had wrongly chosen for the moving services to come a week early. A worker rushes to remove the hot tub, lifting it with a crane over the entire house, swinging and damaging a part of the chimney, angering the wasps that have been living in there; distracted by them, the crane driver pulls a lever that releases the hot tub, letting it fall through the roof, leaving a hole. The buyers soon refuse to move into the Heffleys' house, canceling the Heffleys' move; Greg admits that he was not ready to do so, and he is glad to remain Rowley's best friend.

== Background ==
Wrecking Ball's author and illustrator, Jeff Kinney, decided on the book's theme while doing renovations to his own house. He realized that he had not yet written a book about Greg moving and considered the idea a good fit for the series. Wrecking Ball's title and cover were revealed on May 14, 2019, on Twitter by Kinney.

To promote the book, Kinney hosted a book tour called The Wrecking Ball Show, as a follow-up to the previous book promotion, The Meltdown Show. It lasted for 33 days across multiple countries: Italy, Germany, France, Greece, Bulgaria, Spain, and Portugal. The show's activities were decided live through spinning a wheel; activities included a dancing competition, a tower-building contest with foam blocks, and a trivia challenge.

Kinney used systematic inventive thinking to come up with jokes for the book. He elaborated that "it helps me generate ideas without having to rely on memories. [...] In it, problem-solving is based on templates. If you can use those templates to harness your creativity, then you can solve problems more quickly than you could another way." Kinney described moments from the book in which a kitchen remodel leads to a larger construction project and a hot tub is lifted over the house as based on true experiences. He concluded by describing Wrecking Ball as his "best-written book."

On the subject of the high amount of illustrations in the novel, Kinney stated that the Diary of a Wimpy Kid series is closer to being "long-form comics" rather than a graphic novel." He described the latest Diary of a Wimpy Kid books as requiring many illustrations due to being more "cinematic," then criticized the earlier books for being "sparse and minimalistic."

== Comments by the author ==
Kinney has stated that the theme of the book is "Greg letting go of his childhood home." He found that the best way to open the book would be to have Greg clean out his closet and try to sell objects at a yard sale, reflecting him "letting go of his childhood possessions." While discussing his overseas book tour, Kinney wrote that he sees the series as "a mirror." He explains that the books are popular worldwide because "childhood is universal" and children around the world all "deal with the same kinds of things."

== Reception ==
In its first week, Wrecking Ball sold slightly less than 200,000 copies. As of February 9, 2020, it had sold over 650,000 copies.

Wrecking Ball received generally positive reviews from critics. Kirkus Reviews commented that "Readers can still rely on this series to bring laughs." Carrie R. Wheadon from Common Sense Media gave the book four out of five stars and praised it for having positive messages.
