= Diary of a Wimpy Kid: Dog Days (novel) =

2009 book by Jeff Kinney

- Diary of a Wimpy Kid: Dog Days book cover
- Author: Jeff Kinney
- Illustrator: Jeff Kinney
- Cover artist: Jeff Kinney and Chad W. Beckerman
- Language: English
- Series: Diary of a Wimpy Kid
- Genre: Comedy
- Publisher: Amulet Books (US); Puffin Books (UK)
- Publication date: September 13, 2009 (Canada); September 20, 2009 (United States); February 3, 2011 (paperback re-issue)
- Publication place: United States
- Media type: Print (hardcover, paperback)
- Pages: 217
- ISBN: 978-0-8109-8391-5
- Preceded by: The Last Straw
- Followed by: The Ugly Truth

Diary of a Wimpy Kid: Dog Days is a novel written by American author and cartoonist Jeff Kinney, and is the fourth book in the Diary of a Wimpy Kid series. It was released on September 13, 2009, in Canada and September 20, 2009, in the USA. The film, Diary of a Wimpy Kid: Dog Days, released on August 3, 2012, was based on the book and its predecessor, The Last Straw. It follows the narrator, Greg Heffley, on his summer break between seventh and eighth-grade.

== Plot ==
The book starts with Greg Heffley saying how he is an "indoor person" and he will spend his summer vacation playing video games, but his mother Susan says he has better things to do. Greg and his friend Rowley went to the country club after school let out, but Greg is not invited to return, much to his disappointment. Greg does not want to go to the town pool with his family since he has to walk through the shower area to get there.

Rowley and his father arrive at the Heffleys' house, telling Susan that the boys have an $83 bill worth of smoothies at the country club. They decline to pay, since they were unaware they would be charged and it would be unfair to do so, but the parents disagree. Greg and Rowley start a lawn care service called the "V.I.P. Lawn Care Service", but neither have used a lawn mower before, resulting in disaster.

During Greg's birthday party, Susan takes his birthday money to pay the smoothie bill. One of Greg's presents is a Ladybug, a cell phone that can only make emergency and home calls. Soon, he discovers that his uncle Joe's dog "Killer" ate half of his birthday cake. Feeling bad for how the party turned out, Susan takes Greg to the mall to get a makeup gift, also bringing Rodrick and Manny along. They go to the pet store, where Greg gets an angelfish, Rodrick gets a pet piranha which he neglects, and Manny buys fish food, which he later ate as a snack. After a trip to the water park, Greg finds that Rodrick's piranha (which Susan put in Greg's bowl since she thought Rodrick's bowl was dirty) ate his angelfish while they were gone, upsetting him.

When Frank learns at Father's Day lunch that his father accidentally ran over his dog, Nutty, when he was young, and then lied about him running away to a butterfly farm, he gets a new one to cope with the loss. The dog is named Sweetheart, or Sweetie, and it causes many problems for Greg's summer. Greg and Susan meet Rowley's family at the supermarket, where they are buying groceries for their family vacation to the beach. Rowley's mother invites Greg there, to which Susan agrees, ending in disaster for Greg.

Fearing Frank will sell him to an orphanage, Greg calls the police with his Ladybug phone. After a talk with the cops, Frank gave them tickets to a baseball game (which Susan bought so Frank and Greg could spend time together). After hearing about a video game competition, Greg and Rowley decide to camp in front of the game store, thinking the competition will be there, but Rowley smashes Greg's hand with a mallet. He regrets not staying home and playing video games throughout the summer. He has not seen Rowley since the video game competition and Frank has not talked to him after Greg nearly got him arrested, but they soon think things will be okay. Susan puts the photos from the summer in her scrapbook, labeling it "Best Summer Ever". Greg does not view it that way, but knew that "the one who takes the photos is the one who gets to tell the story".
