= Diary of a Wimpy Kid: No Brainer =

2023 book by Jeff Kinney

- Author: Jeff Kinney
- Illustrator: Jeff Kinney
- Series: Diary of a Wimpy Kid
- Genre: Children's literature Graphic novel
- Publisher: Amulet Books
- Publication date: October 24, 2023
- Publication place: United States
- Pages: 224
- ISBN: 978-1-4197-6694-7
- Preceded by: Diper Överlöde
- Followed by: Hot Mess

Diary of a Wimpy Kid: No Brainer is the 18th book in the Diary of a Wimpy Kid series written and illustrated by Jeff Kinney. It is a sequel to Diper Överlöde and the predecessor to Hot Mess. The book was unveiled on May 17, 2023, with the hardcover releasing on October 24, 2023.

== Plot ==
Greg talks about his opinions about the human brain, where kids use them when it comes going to school. He explains that brains will forget things, and he imagines a school in which only brains attend rather than humans. He also says that the teachers in his school teach "stuff you can't even use."

After the school's test scores fall due to the poor performance of the teachers, the superintendent fires the principal, Mrs. Mancy, and pulls the old principal, Mr. Bottoms, out of retirement. Bottoms makes a lot of changes to the school, such as cutting classes and creating the High Flyers Club, encouraging people to get better grades; this results in more cheating throughout the school.

Soon, Greg talks about a car dealer named Larry Mack, the namesake of the school, who began his car dealership business by stealing money from the school, leading to his arrest, so his son, Larry Mack Junior, took his father's steps.

Greg soon describes the popularity of fudgedogs (tofu dogs covered in hot chocolate fudge), which was created by accident by a lunch lady named Mrs. Podsner, but the problem worsens when the test scores fall, due to the students going to the nurse's office because of them. The principal makes a compromise to reintroduce the product, but under a new style, "fudgedog fingers", half the size of normal fudgedogs.

After many setbacks at the school, Mr. Bottoms announces to raise money by changing the school's name, but a town named Slacksville bids to change the school's name to "Slacksville Rules! Middle School". The principal refuses to do so due to the rivalry between the two. Later, the school hires the exterminator who had his contract canceled from the school, and officially changes its name to "1-800-DED-BUGS Middle School", causing outrage from parents. Soon, Bottoms introduces the "Platinum High Flyers Club" where students can pay $12.99 per month to enter the club, which offers perks such as full-size candies instead of "tiny bags of peanuts".

Later, Greg's parents joins the annual PTA auction and Susan wins the "Principal for the Day", leading Greg to be in charge of the school the next day. When he enters, Mr. Bottoms appears to be in a hurry to leave, and then gives his job to Greg. In the middle of his job, he suddenly gets into a meeting where teachers are frustrated because of the new rules, and Greg quits because of it. The next day, the school newspaper announces that the school will close if scores don't improve on the test, so everybody was now in a state of panic; the school announces that half of the students will go to the newly-opened Fulson Tech, while the other half will go to Slacksville Middle School. Greg's school does poor on the test since students headed to Fulson Tech purposely did bad, and a swarm of bees invaded the classroom, causing havoc throughout the school. As a result, the state refused to give the school a do-over, and the school closed on Friday.

Greg goes to Slacksville Middle School while Rowley goes to Fulson Tech. While at Slacksville, he becomes popular when he tells students there how to read time, giving him the nickname "Time Lord", and he also introduces fudgedogs to the students there. During his spare time, he meets a girl named Sophie, who asks him to go on a date. After accepting her offer, Greg realizes that Sophie's father is Larry Mack Junior. During the date, he places an order in nonsensical Latin to his former teacher, Mr. Leyton, who was working there as a waiter. Larry Mack Junior realizes how smart Greg was, so he decides to renovate and reopen the school, now naming it after himself, leading the students to return to the school. Sophie broke up with Greg because she didn't want to date long-distance.

After the school reopened, they let the sentient cleaning robot to be their temporary principal while Mr. Bottoms declined to return.

== Reception ==
The book received generally positive reviews. Common Sense Media gave the book 3 out of 5 stars, while Sue Mauger on Glam Adelaide admired the book, giving it 4 out of 5 stars. Kirkus Reviews commented, "Collectively a bit much, but taken in small doses, this is a savage rib-tickler."

== Sequel ==
A sequel, titled Diary of a Wimpy Kid: Hot Mess, was announced in January 2024 and released on October 22 of that year.
