= Diary of a Wimpy Kid: The Meltdown =

2018 children's book by Jeff Kinney

- UK cover
- Author: Jeff Kinney
- Series: Diary of a Wimpy Kid
- Genre: Children's literature Graphic novel
- Publisher: Amulet Books (US); Puffin Books (UK)
- Publication date: October 30, 2018 (International); January 23, 2020 (paperback re-issue)
- Publication place: United States
- Preceded by: The Getaway
- Followed by: Wrecking Ball
- Website: https://wimpykid.com/books/book13/

Diary of a Wimpy Kid: The Meltdown is the 13th book in the Diary of a Wimpy Kid series by Jeff Kinney. It was published on October 30, 2018. The story takes place soon after the events of The Getaway, in the winter and centers on a snowball fight in protagonist Greg Heffley's neighborhood. The Meltdown was advertised through a live book tour by Kinney. Upon release, the novel sold several hundred thousand copies and received positive reviews from critics.

== Plot ==
On a hot day in January, Greg worries about climate change and how it will impact his life in the future. When he does not complete one of his social studies assignments, his mother punishes him by not allowing him to watch television or play video games until he finishes it. Greg is unable to play outside due to a rivalry between the kids on Lower Surrey Street and Upper Surrey Street. The next day, his family unsuccessfully searches for their pet pig, who was acquired in The Long Haul, and had escaped from obedience school.

Greg is frustrated at school since his classmates are unsanitary, and struggles with the cold weather. While walking to school, Greg is stopped by the Safety Patrols, an authoritative organization of now only female students. The students begin rioting at the school when they fear that they will be snowed in overnight, and are dismissed early.

Greg and his friend Rowley take the bus of the rival Whirley Street, and are accused for throwing a snowball at the bus driver, so they are kicked off the bus. The two are dropped off near the woods, where they accidentally wander into the camp of the Mingo Kids, a savage group who live in the woods. They run away frightened, but get lost in the woods by doing so. However, Greg and Rowley are eventually saved when they come across Greg's father, Frank.

The next morning, Greg meets with Rowley and builds a snow fort, indirectly starting a snowball fight among the Upper Surrey Street kids. They agree to team up after being ambushed by the Lower Surrey Street residents, and build a single gigantic fort, enjoying early success, but their confidence is weakened as the Lower Surrey Street kids start surrounding the wall. A Lower Surrey Street spy, Trevor Nix, lures many Upper Surrey Street defenders away from the fort, allowing the Lower Surrey Street kids to destroy it, but the long-resentful school Safety Patrols begin to attack the various Surrey Street kids. The Whirley Street kids also get involved, but they, in addition to the Surrey Street and Safety Patrol kids, join together against the attacking Mingo Kids. Tired of the violence, Greg and Rowley attempt to hide in the remains of the snow fort, but when a delayed snowplow arrives and drives through the remains of the fight, everyone agrees to stop fighting. Days later, the weather begins to clear up, and Greg is glad that he survived the snowball fight.

== Development ==
According to Kinney, The Meltdown is a "war book." While writing the conflict of a snowstorm, he attempted to keep it authentic to what children could experience in real life. Kinney acknowledged the presence of political elements to the story: "It was definitely hard not to think about [them]. I’m not making specific commentary, but the elements are all there."

== Release ==
Multiple advertising campaigns were run for The Meltdown. Kinney ran a book tour entitled Wimpy Kid Live: The Meltdown Show, visiting the United Kingdom, Norway, Sweden, the Netherlands, Germany, Denmark, Finland, and Canada. To keep the performances varied, the tour focused on a wheel that Kinney would spin, which is able to land on one of 10 activities. In total, 7,000 tickets were sold for the show. Abrams Books, an imprint of Amulet and the publishers of The Meltdown, helped advertise this promotion through sponsored social media posts, while Kinney handed out autographs from a bus themed after the book. The success of The Meltdown Show led Kinney to host another book tour for the following series installment, Diary of a Wimpy Kid: Wrecking Ball.

== Reception ==
National Geographic Kids praised The Meltdown for its comedy and fast pacing. Carrie R. Wheadon of Common Sense Media enjoyed the snowball fight climax, but found the rest of the book "less cohesive and engaging."

=== Sales ===
USA Today reported The Meltdown as the sixth bestselling book of 2018, and the 65th bestselling of 2019. In The Meltdown's first week, over 234,000 copies were sold. It had 743,309 sales by December 6, 2018. By March 2019, The Meltdown had sold 2 million copies worldwide.
