= Funbrain =

Educational browser game

- Website type: Youth education
- Available in: English; German; French; Italian
- Founded: May 1992
- Owner: Family Education Network
- Website: funbrain.com
- Commercial: Yes
- Launched: 1992

Funbrain is an educational browser game website for children and adults. It was the site where Diary of a Wimpy Kid was first published before being turned into a successful book series and movie franchise.

== History ==
The website was founded in May 1992 and is owned by Poptropica Worldwide, a division of Pearson Education's Family Education Network. The current publisher is Jess Brallier. The company said the site has 65,000 teachers registered, 35 million visits per month, and 60,000 page visits per day, and provides mathematics and kid style games.

== Features ==
- Diary of a Wimpy Kid. A popular feature of FunBrain.com was the continuous story Diary of a Wimpy Kid by Jeff Kinney, which was published as a novel in April 2007. In August 2021, Diary of a Wimpy Kid was shut down and is no longer available to read on the website, though it has since been archived.
- Math Arcade The Math Arcade, a collection of 25 math related games such as Ball Hogs, Mummy Hunt, and Bumble Numbers, is a game with fairly simple basic math, with difficulty varying depending on the age of the player. This arcade is completely finished.
- Fun Arcade. The Fun Arcade is a collection of 25 fun games, though only 13 are available and currently running. It has games such as Pig Toss, Mighty Guy/Girl (depending on the gender of the player) and Planetary Pinball.
- Playground. A collection of 24 games and activities aimed at younger kids, it has significantly easier games like Helipopper and Desert Dive. It is officially known as the Mom and Kid's Playground.
- Galactic Hot Dogs

== Alexa rating ==
On January 31, 2007, the site had an Alexa rating of 3,723.

On April 4, 2009, the site had an Alexa rating of 2,259.

On March 31, 2013, the site had an Alexa rating of 11,066 with a 16% bounce rate.

On October 14, 2017, the site had an Alexa rating of 53,934 with a 75.10% bounce rate.

On February 16, 2021, the site had an Alexa rating of 67,362 with a 51.9% bounce rate.

== Safety ==
Funbrain is a website with no interaction with other players, limiting conversation and other adverse conditions of chatting. The site has been KidSafe certified. CommonSense Media rates the site as appropriate for kids ages 7+ based on parent and child reviews.

Funbrain does have both banner and popup ads. It also has sponsored limited time games for products such as Air Buddies, etc. and heavily pushes membership for its sister site Poptropica.

== Awards ==
- "Digital Dozen" from the Eisenhower National Clearinghouse for Mathematics and Science Education
