= Lists of films by studio =

These are lists of films sorted by film studios that made them.

== Major studios ==
=== Walt Disney Studios ===
- List of Walt Disney Studios films (1937–1959)
- List of Walt Disney Studios films (1960–1979)
- List of Walt Disney Studios films (1980–1989)
- List of Walt Disney Studios films (1990–1999)
- List of Walt Disney Studios films (2000–2009)
- List of Walt Disney Studios films (2010–2019)
- List of Walt Disney Studios films (2020–2029)
- List of Walt Disney Studios Motion Pictures international films (1980–1999)
- List of Walt Disney Studios Motion Pictures international films (2000–2009)
- List of Walt Disney Studios Motion Pictures international films (2010–2019)
- List of Walt Disney Studios Motion Pictures international films (2020–2029)

=== 20th Century Studios ===
- List of Fox Film films (1914–1935)
- List of Twentieth Century Pictures films (1933–1935)
- List of 20th Century Fox films (1935–1999)
- List of 20th Century Fox films (2000–2020)
- List of 20th Century Studios films (2020–2029)
- List of 20th Century Fox International films

=== Searchlight Pictures ===
- List of Searchlight Pictures films
- List of Fox Searchlight Pictures films (1995–1999)
- List of Fox Searchlight Pictures films (2000–2009)
- List of Fox Searchlight Pictures films (2010–2019)

=== Universal Pictures ===
- List of Universal Pictures films (1912–1919)
- List of Universal Pictures films (1920–1929)
- List of Universal Pictures films (1930–1939)
- List of Universal Pictures films (1940–1949)
- List of Universal Pictures films (1950–1959)
- List of Universal Pictures films (1960–1969)
- List of Universal Pictures films (1970–1979)
- List of Universal Pictures films (1980–1989)
- List of Universal Pictures films (1990–1999)
- List of Universal Pictures films (2000–2009)
- List of Universal Pictures films (2010–2019)
- List of Universal Pictures films (2020–2029)
- List of Universal Pictures International films

=== Paramount Pictures ===
- List of Paramount Pictures films (1912–1919)
- List of Paramount Pictures films (1920–1929)
- List of Paramount Pictures films (1930–1939)
- List of Paramount Pictures films (1940–1949)
- List of Paramount Pictures films (1950–1959)
- List of Paramount Pictures films (1960–1969)
- List of Paramount Pictures films (1970–1979)
- List of Paramount Pictures films (1980–1989)
- List of Paramount Pictures films (1990–1999)
- List of Paramount Pictures films (2000–2009)
- List of Paramount Pictures films (2010–2019)
- List of Paramount Pictures films (2020–2029)

=== Warner Bros. Pictures ===
- List of Warner Bros. films (1918–1929)
- List of Warner Bros. films (1930–1939)
- List of Warner Bros. films (1940–1949)
- List of Warner Bros. films (1950–1959)
- List of Warner Bros. films (1960–1969)
- List of Warner Bros. films (1970–1979)
- List of Warner Bros. films (1980–1989)
- List of Warner Bros. films (1990–1999)
- List of Warner Bros. films (2000–2009)
- List of Warner Bros. films (2010–2019)
- List of Warner Bros. films (2020–2029)
- List of Warner Bros. International films (1990–1999)
- List of Warner Bros. International films (2000–2009)
- List of Warner Bros. International films (2010–2019)
- List of Warner Bros. International films (2020–2029)

=== Columbia Pictures ===
- List of Columbia Pictures films (1922–1939)
- List of Columbia Pictures films (1940–1949)
- List of Columbia Pictures films (1950–1959)
- List of Columbia Pictures films (1960–1969)
- List of Columbia Pictures films (1970–1979)
- List of Columbia Pictures films (1980–1989)
- List of Columbia Pictures films (1990–1999)
- List of Columbia Pictures films (2000–2009)
- List of Columbia Pictures films (2010–2019)
- List of Columbia Pictures films (2020–2029)

=== Metro-Goldwyn-Mayer ===
- List of Metro-Goldwyn-Mayer films (1924–1929)
- List of Metro-Goldwyn-Mayer films (1930–1939)
- List of Metro-Goldwyn-Mayer films (1940–1949)
- List of Metro-Goldwyn-Mayer films (1950–1959)
- List of Metro-Goldwyn-Mayer films (1960–1969)
- List of Metro-Goldwyn-Mayer films (1970–1979)
- List of Metro-Goldwyn-Mayer films (1980–1989)
- List of Metro-Goldwyn-Mayer films (1990–1999)
- List of Metro-Goldwyn-Mayer films (2000–2009)
- List of Metro-Goldwyn-Mayer films (2010–2019)
- List of Metro-Goldwyn-Mayer films (2020–2029)

=== Lionsgate ===
- List of Lionsgate films (1997–1999)
- List of Lionsgate films (2000–2009)
- List of Lionsgate films (2010–2019)
- List of Lionsgate films (2020–2029)
- List of Lionsgate theatrical animated feature films

=== Netflix ===
- List of Netflix original films (2015–2017)
- List of Netflix original films (2018)
- List of Netflix original films (2019)
- List of Netflix original films (2020)
- List of Netflix original films (2021)
- List of Netflix original films (2022)
- List of Netflix original films (2023)
- List of Netflix original films (2024)
- List of Netflix original films (2025)
- List of Netflix original films (since 2026)

=== Gaumont ===
- List of Gaumont films (1950–1959)
- List of Gaumont films (1970–1979)
- List of Gaumont films (1980–1989)
- List of Gaumont films (1990–1999)
- List of Gaumont films (2000–2009)
- List of Gaumont films (2010–2019)
- List of Gaumont films (2020–2029)

== Other studios ==
=== Asia ===
- Art Theatre Guild
- CJ Entertainment
- Dharma Productions
- Disney+ Hotstar
- Eros International
- Golden Harvest
- Malay Film Productions
- Mingxing
- Netflix India
- Nikkatsu Roman Porno
- Shree Venkatesh Films
- Star Cinema
- Star (Disney+)
- T-Series
- Toho
- Yash Raj Films

=== Europe ===
- BBC Studios Natural History Unit
- British and Dominions
- British Lion Films
- British National
- Butcher's Film Service
- Celluloid Dreams
- Continental-Kunstfilm
- Gainsborough Pictures
- Gaumont
- General Film Distributors
- Inti Films
- ITC Entertainment
- Ealing Studios
- Stoll Pictures
- StudioCanal
- Tobis Film
- Two Cities Films
- UFA
- United International Pictures

=== The Walt Disney Company ===
- The Walt Disney Company
  - Walt Disney Studios
  - Walt Disney Pictures
  - Walt Disney Animation Studios
  - Pixar
  - Disneytoon Studios
  - Walt Disney Television Animation
  - Touchstone Pictures
  - Hollywood Pictures
  - American Broadcasting Company
  - Lucasfilm
  - National Geographic
  - Disney+
  - Hulu
  - 20th Century Studios
  - Searchlight Pictures
  - 20th Century Animation
  - Blue Sky Studios
  - Fox Animation Studios
  - Fox Film
  - Twentieth Century Pictures

=== Comcast ===
- Comcast
  - Universal Pictures
  - Focus Features
  - Illumination
  - DreamWorks Animation
  - Peacock
  - Universal Animation Studios

=== Skydance Corporation ===
- Skydance Corporation
  - Paramount Pictures
  - List of Paramount Pictures theatrical animated feature films
  - Paramount British
  - Republic Pictures
  - CBS
  - Miramax
  - Nickelodeon Movies
  - Nickelodeon Animation Studio
  - Paramount+
  - Paramount Animation
  - Skydance Media
  - Skydance Animation
  - Warner Bros.
  - Warner Bros. Pictures Animation
  - Warner Bros. Animation
  - Warner Bros. Cartoons
  - Cartoon Network
  - Hanna-Barbera Productions
  - Hanna-Barbera Films
  - Metro-Goldwyn-Mayer cartoon studio
  - New Line Cinema
  - Castle Rock Entertainment
  - HBO Films
  - First National Pictures
  - Monogram Pictures / Allied Artists Pictures
  - HBO Max
  - List of HBO Max exclusive international distribution programming
  - Rooster Teeth
  - Rankin/Bass Productions

=== Sony Pictures Entertainment ===
- Sony Pictures Entertainment
  - Columbia Pictures
  - Crackle
  - TriStar Pictures
  - Screen Gems
  - Sony Pictures Classics
  - Sony Pictures Animation
  - List of Sony theatrical animated feature films
  - Sony Pictures Releasing International

=== Mini-majors ===
- Amazon
  - Amazon MGM Studios
  - Metro-Goldwyn-Mayer
  - Metro Pictures
  - United Artists
  - Orion Pictures
  - Amazon Prime Video
  - Amazon Freevee
  - The Cannon Group
  - MGM Animation
- Lionsgate Studios
  - Lionsgate
  - Lionsgate Animation
  - Roadside Attractions
  - Summit Entertainment
- A24
- STX Entertainment
- Apple Inc./Apple Studios
  - Apple Studios
- Open Road Films
- Angel Studios
- Lantern Entertainment
  - The Weinstein Company
  - The Weinstein Company Animation
  - Dimension Films
- Netflix, Inc.
  - Netflix
  - List of Netflix exclusive international distribution films
- Legendary Pictures
- Amblin Partners
  - Amblin Entertainment
  - DreamWorks Pictures
- Starz Entertainment
  - Starz

=== Other ===
- The Asylum
- Bleecker Street
- Blumhouse Productions
- Brooksfilms
- Chesterfield Pictures
- Coronet Films
- Eagle-Lion Films
- Embassy Pictures
- Encyclopædia Britannica Films
- Film Booking Offices of America
- First Motion Picture Unit
- First National Pictures
- Full Moon Features
- Grand National Pictures
- IFC Films
- Island Pictures
- Lippert Pictures
- Neon
- Outerbanks Entertainment
- Pathé Exchange
- Producers Releasing Corporation
- Psychopathic Video
- Relativity Media
- RKO Pictures
- Samuel Goldwyn Productions
- Scott Free Productions
- Silver Pictures
- Thanhouser Company
- Tiffany Pictures
- Triangle Film Corporation
- Troma Team Video
- Vitagraph Studios
- Vertical Entertainment
- World Film
- YouTube

== See also ==
- Lists of films
- List of film production companies
- List of film serials by studio
- List of Live-action shorts by Studio
