= List of Gaumont films =

Logo used since 2026

The following are lists of Gaumont films by decade:

== Lists ==
- List of Gaumont films (1950–1959)
- List of Gaumont films (1970–1979)
- List of Gaumont films (1980–1989)
- List of Gaumont films (1990–1999)
- List of Gaumont films (2000–2009)
- List of Gaumont films (2010–2019)
- List of Gaumont films (2020–2029)

== See also ==
- Gaumont
