= List of Embassy Pictures films =

This is a list of films produced by Embassy Pictures, an American independent film production and distribution studio.

== 1950s ==
Release date	Title	Notes
April 27, 1956	Godzilla, King of the Monsters!	1956 re-cut of Godzilla, originally produced and released by Toho in 1954.
February 4, 1959	The Lady Is a Square	distributed by Metro-Goldwyn-Mayer, originally released by Associated British-Pathé
July 22, 1959	Hercules	distributed by Warner Bros.

== 1960s ==
Release date	Title	Notes
February 17, 1960	Jack the Ripper	distributed by Paramount Pictures
July 13, 1960	Hercules Unchained	distributed by Warner Bros.; featured on the cult TV series Mystery Science Theater 3000
May 9, 1961	Two Women	North American distribution only
May 28, 1961	David and Goliath	
August 10, 1961	The Thief of Baghdad	Co-production with Titanus and Lux Compagnie Cinématographique de France, distributed by Metro-Goldwyn-Mayer
November 17, 1961	Morgan, the Pirate	Distributed by Metro-Goldwyn-Mayer
December 13, 1961	The Wonders of Aladdin	Distributed by Metro-Goldwyn-Mayer
July 16, 1962	Strangers in the City	
October 10, 1962	Long Day's Journey Into Night	
January 23, 1963	The Last Days of Sodom and Gomorrah	distributed by 20th Century-Fox
1964	Goliath and the Rebel Slave	
March 10, 1964	The Empty Canvas	co-production with Paramount Pictures
April 9, 1964	The Carpetbaggers	Distributed by Paramount Pictures
August 12, 1964	A House Is Not a Home	
November 2, 1964	Where Love Has Gone	Distributed by Paramount Pictures
November 14, 1964	Santa Claus Conquers the Martians	Featured on the cult TV series Mystery Science Theater 3000
December 18, 1964	Contempt	
June 23, 1965	Harlow	Distributed by Paramount Pictures
June 30, 1965	Requiem for a Gunfighter	
July 31, 1965	The Bounty Killer	
October 20, 1965	Village of the Giants	Featured on the cult TV series Mystery Science Theater 3000
October 1965	Git!	
November 5, 1965	Country Music on Broadway	
November 14, 1965	The Little Nuns	US distribution only; Hesperia Cinematografica (Italy)
November 14, 1965	The Second Best Secret Agent in the Whole Wide World	US distribution only; Alistair Films (UK)
December 20, 1965	The 10th Victim	US distribution only; Italo-French co-production
March 4, 1966	The Oscar	
April 10, 1966	Jesse James Meets Frankenstein's Daughter	
April 10, 1966	John F. Kennedy: Years of Lightning, Day of Drums	
April 10, 1966	Billy the Kid Versus Dracula	
June 1966	The Cat	
June 1966	An Eye for an Eye	
June 22, 1966	The Daydreamer	co-production with Rankin/Bass Productions
August 3, 1966	A Man Called Adam	
August 10, 1966	The Idol	Distributed by Paramount Pictures
September 1966	Jack Frost	US distribution only; produced by Gorky Film Studio; featured on the cult TV series Mystery Science Theater 3000
November 2, 1966	Picture Mommy Dead	
March 8, 1967	Mad Monster Party?	co-production with Rankin/Bass Productions
May 1, 1967	They Came from Beyond Space	US distribution only; produced by Amicus Productions
May 1, 1967	The Terrornauts	US distribution only; produced by Amicus Productions
May 24, 1967	The Caper of the Golden Bulls	Distributed by Paramount Pictures
June 27, 1967	Woman Times Seven	
September 6, 1967	Where the Bullets Fly	US distribution only; Alistair Films (UK) and Puck Films (UK)
September 27, 1967	Robbery	US distribution only; Oakhurst Productions (UK)
December 2, 1967	The Wacky World of Mother Goose	co-production with Rankin/Bass Productions
December 21, 1967	The Graduate	Inducted into the National Film Registry in 1996
March 18, 1968	The Producers	Inducted into the National Film Registry in 1996
October 30, 1968	The Lion in Winter	
March 19, 1969	Baby Love	
July 30, 1969	Stiletto	
November 11, 1969	Don't Drink the Water	
December 3, 1969	A Nice Girl Like Me	
December 15, 1969	Generation	

== 1970s ==
Release date	Title	Notes
March 25, 1970	The Adventurers	co-production with Paramount Pictures
August 12, 1970	Soldier Blue	
August 17, 1970	Macho Callahan	
August 26, 1970	The People Next Door	
October 14, 1970	C.C. and Company	
January 21, 1971	Promise at Dawn	
February 8, 1971	Hot Pants Holiday	
February 17, 1971	The Man Who Had Power Over Women	
February 28, 1971	The Sporting Club	
June 30, 1971	Carnal Knowledge	
September 15, 1971	The Steagle	
December 1, 1971	The Ski Bum	
1972	Wacky Taxi	
1972	The Witches Mountain	US distribution only
February 15, 1972	The Nightcomers	
April 1, 1972	J.C.	
June 15, 1972	A Place Called Today	
August 1972	Bloomfield	
August 23, 1972	Rivals	
September 13, 1972	The Ruling Class	
October 1972	Thumb Tripping	
November 1972	The Stoolie	
February 1973	Jory	
April 11, 1973	Book of Numbers	distribution only; produced by Brut Productions
June 15, 1973	Interval	
June 20, 1973	A Touch of Class	distribution only; produced by Brut Productions
August 10, 1973	Night Watch	distribution only; produced by Brut Productions
October 23, 1973	The Summertime Killer	
November 14, 1973	Hurry Up, or I'll Be 30	
December 19, 1973	The Day of the Dolphin	
July 11, 1974	The Tamarind Seed	produced by ITC Entertainment and Lorimar Productions
July 24, 1974	Lucky Luciano	
September 20, 1974	Homebodies	
December 5, 1974	The Photographer	
March 1, 1975	Shatter	
April 30, 1975	Tubby the Tuba	
August 8, 1975	Farewell, My Lovely	produced by ITC Entertainment
August 20, 1975	Russian Roulette	produced by ITC Entertainment
October 22, 1975	Diamonds	
October 27, 1975	The Mummy's Revenge	
November 1, 1975	Permission to Kill	
November 7, 1975	Mister Quilp	
November 1975	Petersen	
December 14, 1975	Deadly Hero	
December 1975	Psychic Killer	
January 1976	The Four Deuces	
March 5, 1976	Man Friday	
April 11, 1976	The Sailor Who Fell from Grace with the Sea	
May 19, 1976	The Premonition	
May 28, 1976	Shoot	
October 1976	Bittersweet Love	
November 1976	Pipe Dreams	
December 22, 1976	Voyage of the Damned	produced by ITC Entertainment
January 1977	False Face	
February 9, 1977	The Cassandra Crossing	produced by ITC Entertainment
March 23, 1977	The Domino Principle	produced by ITC Entertainment
May 7, 1977	Cross of Iron	produced by EMI Films and ITC Entertainment
August 4, 1977	The Great Gundown	
August 1977	Sidewinder 1	
October 1977	The Chicken Chronicles	
April 9, 1978	Rabbit Test	
April 28, 1978	The Manitou	
May 10, 1978	A Different Story	
June 14, 1978	Go Tell the Spartans	
August 1978	Stingray	
October 1978	Born Again	
November 1, 1978	Watership Down	US theatrical distribution only
February 1, 1979	Murder By Decree	
March 21, 1979	The Bell Jar	
March 28, 1979	Phantasm	
April 13, 1979	Old Boyfriends	
May 11, 1979	Winter Kills	
June 8, 1979	Rudolph and Frosty's Christmas in July	distribution only; produced by Rankin/Bass Productions
June 15, 1979	Goldengirl	
August 31, 1979	City on Fire	
September 19, 1979	The Onion Field	
September 28, 1979	A Man, a Woman, and a Bank	

== 1980s ==
Release date	Title	Notes
January 25, 1980	Fish Hawk	distribution only; produced by Canadian Film Development Corporation
February 1, 1980	The Fog	
March 7, 1980	The Black Marble	
March 7, 1980	Death Ship	distribution only; produced by Astral Films
April 1, 1980	The Baltimore Bullet	distribution only; produced by Filmfair Communications
April 11, 1980	Night Games	distribution only; produced by Golden Harvest
June 1, 1980	Hog Wild	distribution only
August 15, 1980	Prom Night	distribution only; produced by Astral Films
September 10, 1980	The Exterminator	distribution only; produced by Shapiro-Glickenhaus Entertainment
September 26, 1980	Hopscotch	distribution only
January 14, 1981	Scanners	distribution only; produced by Filmplan International
January 16, 1981	Fear No Evil	co-production with LaLoggia Productions
March 6, 1981	Dirty Tricks	distribution only; produced by Filmplan International
March 13, 1981	The Howling	co-production with International Film Investors and Wescom Productions
May 15, 1981	Take This Job and Shove It	co-production with Cinema Group Ventures
May 29, 1981	Dead & Buried	distribution only
June 5, 1981	The Night the Lights Went Out in Georgia	
June 5, 1981	Final Exam	distribution only
July 10, 1981	Escape from New York	co-production with International Film Investors, Goldcrest Films International and City Films
August 14, 1981	An Eye for an Eye	co-production with Adams Apple Production Company, South Street Films and Westcom Barber International
September 25, 1981	Carbon Copy	distribution only; produced by Hemdale and RKO Pictures
October 1981	Tulips	distribution only; produced by Astral Films
November 6, 1981	Time Bandits	US distribution only; produced by Handmade Films
November 18, 1981	Crunch	distribution only
November 19, 1981	Roadgames	
January 22, 1982	Vice Squad	
January 29, 1982	The Seduction	
February 19, 1982	Swamp Thing	
March 12, 1982	Parasite	
April 2, 1982	The Long Good Friday	US distribution only; produced by Handmade Films
May 7, 1982	Paradise	co-production with RSL Films
June 11, 1982	Humongous	distribution only; produced by Astral Films
June 15, 1982	The Soldier	
July 23, 1982	The Challenge	distribution only, produced by CBS Theatrical Films
July 23, 1982	Zapped!	
July 30, 1982	Hysterical	distribution only
October 15, 1982	Enigma	
December 10, 1982	Savannah Smiles	
April 8, 1983	Losin' It	
April 20, 1983	Champions	
June 17, 1983	Fanny and Alexander	US distribution only
July 8, 1983	Deadly Force	
August 5, 1983	Get Crazy	distribution only
August 19, 1983	The Ballad of Gregorio Cortez	
September 23, 1983	Eddie and the Cruisers	co-production with Aurora Productions
March 2, 1984	This Is Spinal Tap	Inducted into the National Film Registry in 2002
September 28, 1984	The Bear	
January 9, 1985	The Plague Dogs	re-cut version of the 1982 animated film; produced by Nepenthe Productions
March 1, 1985	The Sure Thing	co-production with Monument Pictures
July 3, 1985	The Emerald Forest	
December 13, 1985	A Chorus Line	co-production with PolyGram Pictures; distributed by Columbia Pictures
January 31, 1986	The Goodbye People	distribution only; produced by Castle Hill Productions
April 25, 1986	Crimewave	co-production with Renaissance Pictures; distributed by Columbia Pictures
May 2, 1986	Saving Grace	distributed by Columbia Pictures

== See also ==
- Lists of films by studio
- De Laurentiis Entertainment Group
- List of films in the public domain
