= List of Open Road films =

American film production And distribution company

Open Road Films is an American film distribution and production company. The list also includes the films from the era when the company was known as Global Road Entertainment.

== Released ==
=== 2010s ===
Release date	Title	Notes
September 23, 2011	Killer Elite	
January 27, 2012	The Grey	Co-distribution with FilmDistrict
March 9, 2012	Silent House	
April 13, 2012	Lockout	Co-distribution with FilmDistrict
August 24, 2012	Hit and Run	
September 21, 2012	End of Watch	
October 26, 2012	Silent Hill: Revelation	U.S. distribution only
November 21, 2012	Red Dawn	Co-distribution with FilmDistrict
January 11, 2013	A Haunted House	
February 8, 2013	Side Effects	
March 29, 2013	The Host	
August 16, 2013	Jobs	
October 11, 2013	Machete Kills	
November 27, 2013	Homefront	
December 25, 2013	Justin Bieber's Believe	
January 17, 2014	The Nut Job	U.S. distribution only
March 28, 2014	Sabotage	
April 18, 2014	A Haunted House 2	
May 9, 2014	Chef	
July 25, 2014	The Fluffy Movie	
October 31, 2014	Nightcrawler	
November 14, 2014	Rosewater	
January 30, 2015	The Loft	
March 20, 2015	The Gunman	
April 24, 2015	Little Boy	
June 19, 2015	Dope	
October 23, 2015	Rock the Kasbah	
November 6, 2015	Spotlight	U.S. distribution only
January 29, 2016	Fifty Shades of Black	U.S. distribution only
February 26, 2016	Triple 9	U.S. distribution only
April 29, 2016	Mother's Day	U.S. distribution only
July 29, 2016	Gleason	Co-distribution with Amazon Studios
September 16, 2016	Snowden	
October 14, 2016	Max Steel	
November 18, 2016	Bleed for This	
January 13, 2017	Sleepless	
February 24, 2017	Collide	U.S. distribution only
March 3, 2017	Before I Fall	
April 14, 2017	Spark	U.S. distribution only
April 21, 2017	The Promise	
August 11, 2017	The Nut Job 2: Nutty by Nature	U.S. distribution only
September 8, 2017	Home Again	
October 13, 2017	Marshall	
October 27, 2017	All I See Is You	

=== As Global Road Entertainment ===
Release date	Title	Notes
March 23, 2018	Midnight Sun	
May 5, 2018	Real	
May 18, 2018	Show Dogs	
June 8, 2018	Hotel Artemis	
July 13, 2018	Siberia	Production company only
July 20, 2018	Zoe	Production company only
August 24, 2018	A.X.L.	
August 31, 2018	Boarding School	
January 25, 2019	Serenity	Production company only
May 17, 2019	The Professor	Production company only
May 31, 2019	Domino	Production company only
June 19, 2019	Beats	Production company only
January 31, 2020	The Rhythm Section	Production company only
March 19, 2021	City of Lies	uncredited; original distribution

=== 2020s ===
Release date	Title	Notes
October 16, 2020	Honest Thief	Co-distribution with Briarcliff Entertainment
October 23, 2020	After We Collided	
January 15, 2021	The Marksman	Co-distribution with Briarcliff Entertainment
April 30, 2021	Separation	Co-distribution with Briarcliff Entertainment
September 17, 2021	Copshop	
February 25, 2022	Studio 666	Co-distribution with Briarcliff Entertainment
April 29, 2022	Memory	Co-distribution with Briarcliff Entertainment
May 20, 2022	Good Mourning	Co-distribution with Briarcliff Entertainment
February 15, 2023	Marlowe	
May 26, 2023	Kandahar	
