= List of Walt Disney Studios films (2000–2009) =

This is a list of films produced and distributed by the Walt Disney Studios, one of the Walt Disney Company's divisions and one of the "Big Five" major film studios. The list includes films produced or released by all existing, defunct, and sold labels or subsidiaries of the Walt Disney Studios during 2000–2009 time period, which includes Walt Disney Pictures, Walt Disney Animation Studios, Pixar Animation Studios, Touchstone Pictures, Hollywood Pictures and Disneynature. All of these films were produced or financed by Disney.

This list does not include Miramax Films and Dimension Films titles as they were operated independently during Disney's ownership of Miramax. Films from Lucasfilm, Marvel Entertainment, and 20th Century Fox are completely excluded from this list as Disney wouldn't acquire their ownership until years later.

All films listed are theatrical releases by Buena Vista Pictures Distribution / Walt Disney Studios Motion Pictures unless specified.

Release date	Title	Studio release label	Notes
January 1, 2000	Fantasia 2000	Walt Disney Pictures	Walt Disney Feature Animation
January 14, 2000	Play It to the Bone	Touchstone Pictures	North American and Korean distribution only
February 4, 2000	Gun Shy	Hollywood Pictures	North and Latin American, Australian, New Zealand and Japanese distribution only; Fortis Films
February 11, 2000	The Tigger Movie	Walt Disney Pictures	Walt Disney Television Animation
March 10, 2000	Mission to Mars	Touchstone Pictures	distribution outside France, Spain, Germany, Austria, the Nordics, Portugal, Angola, Mozambique, South Africa, Poland, Hungary, Israel, Benelux pay television and Italian free television only; The Jacobson Company
March 10, 2000	Whispers: An Elephant's Tale	Walt Disney Pictures	
March 31, 2000	High Fidelity	Touchstone Pictures	Working Title Films, Dogstar Films and New Crime Productions
April 14, 2000	Keeping the Faith	Touchstone Pictures	distribution outside Germany, Austria, the Nordics, Portugal, Angola, Mozambique, South Africa, Greece, Cyprus, Poland, Hungary, the Baltics, the CIS, Israel, Japan, French-language television, Benelux pay television, Spanish pay and pay-per-view television, Italian free television, and international airlines and ships only; Spyglass Entertainment, Koch Co., Norton/Blumberg Productions and Triple Threat Talent
May 19, 2000	Dinosaur	Walt Disney Pictures	Walt Disney Feature Animation and The Secret Lab
May 26, 2000	Shanghai Noon	Touchstone Pictures	distribution outside Germany, Austria, the Nordics, Portugal, Angola, Mozambique, South Africa, Greece, Cyprus, Poland, Hungary, the Baltics, the CIS, Israel, Japan, French-language television, Benelux pay television, Spanish pay and pay-per-view television, Italian free television, and international airlines and ships only; Spyglass Entertainment, Birnbaum/Barber Productions and Jackie Chan Films
June 9, 2000	Gone in 60 Seconds	Touchstone Pictures	Jerry Bruckheimer Films
July 7, 2000	The Kid	Walt Disney Pictures	
August 4, 2000	Coyote Ugly	Touchstone Pictures	Jerry Bruckheimer Films
August 25, 2000	The Crew	Touchstone Pictures	North American distribution only; Sonnenfeld/Josephson Worldwide Entertainment
September 15, 2000	Duets	Hollywood Pictures	distribution in North and Hispanic America, Australia, New Zealand, South Africa and Spain only; Seven Arts Pictures and Beacon Pictures
September 29, 2000	Remember the Titans	Walt Disney Pictures	Jerry Bruckheimer Films and Technical Black Films
November 22, 2000	Unbreakable	Touchstone Pictures	Blinding Edge Pictures and Barry Mendel Productions
November 22, 2000	102 Dalmatians	Walt Disney Pictures	
December 15, 2000	The Emperor's New Groove	Walt Disney Pictures	Walt Disney Feature Animation
December 22, 2000	O Brother, Where Art Thou?	Touchstone Pictures	North American distribution only; Universal Pictures, StudioCanal and Blind Bard Pictures
January 12, 2001	Double Take	Touchstone Pictures	
February 16, 2001	Recess: School's Out	Walt Disney Pictures	Walt Disney Television Animation
April 6, 2001	Just Visiting	Hollywood Pictures	North American distribution only; Gaumont
May 25, 2001	Pearl Harbor	Touchstone Pictures	Jerry Bruckheimer Films
June 15, 2001	Atlantis: The Lost Empire	Walt Disney Pictures	Walt Disney Feature Animation
June 29, 2001	Crazy/Beautiful	Touchstone Pictures	Ulfland Productions
August 3, 2001	The Princess Diaries	Walt Disney Pictures	BrownHouse Productions
August 24, 2001	Bubble Boy	Touchstone Pictures	
September 7, 2001	New Port South	Touchstone Pictures	Hughes Entertainment
October 5, 2001	Max Keeble's Big Move	Walt Disney Pictures	Karz Entertainment
October 12, 2001	Corky Romano	Touchstone Pictures	
October 26, 2001	High Heels and Low Lifes	Touchstone Pictures	Fragile Films
November 2, 2001	Monsters, Inc.	Walt Disney Pictures	distribution only; Pixar Animation Studios
November 21, 2001	Out Cold	Touchstone Pictures	distribution outside Germany, Austria, the Nordics, Portugal, Angola, Mozambique, South Africa, Greece, Cyprus, Poland, Hungary, the Baltics, the CIS, Israel, Japan, French-language and Spanish-language television, Benelux pay television, Italian free television, and international airlines and ships only; Spyglass Entertainment and The Donners' Company
December 14, 2001	The Royal Tenenbaums	Touchstone Pictures	American Empirical Pictures
January 18, 2002	Snow Dogs	Walt Disney Pictures	Kerner Entertainment
January 25, 2002	The Count of Monte Cristo	Touchstone Pictures	distribution outside Germany, Austria, Switzerland, the Nordics, Portugal, Angola, Mozambique, South Africa, Greece, Cyprus, Poland, Hungary, the Baltics, the CIS, Israel, Japan, French-language and Spanish-language television, Benelux pay television, Italian free television, and international airlines and ships only; Spyglass Entertainment
February 15, 2002	Return to Never Land	Walt Disney Pictures	Walt Disney Television Animation
March 22, 2002	Sorority Boys	Touchstone Pictures	
March 29, 2002	The Rookie	Walt Disney Pictures	
April 5, 2002	Big Trouble	Touchstone Pictures	The Jacobson Company and Sonnenfeld/Josephson Worldwide Entertainment
April 26, 2002	Frank McKlusky, C.I.	Touchstone Pictures	Robert Simonds Productions
May 6, 2002	Ultimate X: The Movie	Touchstone Pictures	ESPN Films
June 7, 2002	Bad Company	Touchstone Pictures	Jerry Bruckheimer Films and Stillking Productions
June 21, 2002	Lilo & Stitch	Walt Disney Pictures	Walt Disney Feature Animation
July 12, 2002	Reign of Fire	Touchstone Pictures	distribution outside the Nordics, Portugal, Angola, Mozambique, South Africa, Greece, Cyprus, Poland, Hungary, the Baltics, the CIS, Israel, Japan, French-language and Spanish-language television, Benelux pay television, Italian free television, and international airlines and ships only; Spyglass Entertainment
July 26, 2002	The Country Bears	Walt Disney Pictures	
August 2, 2002	Signs	Touchstone Pictures	Blinding Edge Pictures and The Kennedy/Marshall Company
September 20, 2002	Spirited Away	Walt Disney Studios	distribution in Japan on home media, North America, Hong Kong, Taiwan, Singapore and France only; Studio Ghibli
September 27, 2002	Sweet Home Alabama	Touchstone Pictures	Original Film
October 4, 2002	Moonlight Mile	Touchstone Pictures	distribution in North and Latin America, the U.K., Ireland, Australia, New Zealand and Asia excluding India and Japan only; Hyde Park Entertainment
October 11, 2002	Tuck Everlasting	Walt Disney Pictures	Scholastic Studios
November 1, 2002	The Santa Clause 2	Walt Disney Pictures	Outlaw Productions and Boxing Cat Films
November 27, 2002	Treasure Planet	Walt Disney Pictures	Walt Disney Feature Animation
December 13, 2002	The Hot Chick	Touchstone Pictures	Happy Madison
December 19, 2002	25th Hour	Touchstone Pictures	distribution outside Japan only; 25th Hour Productions, 40 Acres and a Mule Filmworks, Gamut Films and Industry Entertainment
January 31, 2003	The Recruit	Touchstone Pictures	distribution outside Germany, Austria, Switzerland, the Nordics, Portugal, Angola, Mozambique, South Africa, Greece, Cyprus, Poland, Hungary, the Baltics, the CIS, Israel, French-language and Spanish-language television, Benelux pay television and Italian free television only; Spyglass Entertainment and Epsilon Motion Pictures
February 7, 2003	Shanghai Knights	Touchstone Pictures	distribution outside Germany, Austria, the Nordics, Portugal, Angola, Mozambique, South Africa, Greece, Cyprus, Poland, Hungary, the Baltics, the CIS, Israel, French-language and Spanish-language television, Benelux pay television and Italian free television only; Spyglass Entertainment, Birnbaum / Barber Productions, and Jackie Chan Films
February 14, 2003	The Jungle Book 2	Walt Disney Pictures	Disneytoon Studios
March 7, 2003	Bringing Down the House	Touchstone Pictures	Hyde Park Entertainment
March 21, 2003	Piglet's Big Movie	Walt Disney Pictures	Disneytoon Studios
April 11, 2003	Ghosts of the Abyss	Walt Disney Pictures	North American, U.K. and Irish distribution only; Walden Media
April 18, 2003	Holes	Walt Disney Pictures	distribution outside Portugal, Greece, Cyprus, the CIS, the Benelux and Turkey only; Walden Media, Phoenix Pictures and Chicago Pacific Entertainment
May 2, 2003	The Lizzie McGuire Movie	Walt Disney Pictures	Stan Rogow Productions
May 30, 2003	Finding Nemo	Walt Disney Pictures	distribution only; Pixar Animation Studios
July 9, 2003	Pirates of the Caribbean: The Curse of the Black Pearl	Walt Disney Pictures	Jerry Bruckheimer Films
August 6, 2003	Freaky Friday	Walt Disney Pictures	Gunn Films
August 14, 2003	Open Range	Touchstone Pictures	North and Latin American distribution only; Cobalt Media Group, Beacon Communications, and Tig Productions
September 2, 2003	Calendar Girls	Touchstone Pictures	Limited American release
September 5, 2003	Hope Springs	Touchstone Pictures	
September 19, 2003	Cold Creek Manor	Touchstone Pictures	Red Mullet
September 26, 2003	Under the Tuscan Sun	Touchstone Pictures	
October 3, 2003	Veronica Guerin	Touchstone Pictures	Jerry Bruckheimer Films
November 1, 2003	Brother Bear	Walt Disney Pictures	Walt Disney Feature Animation
November 26, 2003	The Haunted Mansion	Walt Disney Pictures	Eddie Murphy Productions
December 25, 2003	The Young Black Stallion	Walt Disney Pictures	The Kennedy/Marshall Company
January 16, 2004	Teacher's Pet	Walt Disney Pictures	Walt Disney Television Animation
February 6, 2004	Miracle	Walt Disney Pictures	Mayhem Pictures
February 20, 2004	Confessions of a Teenage Drama Queen	Walt Disney Pictures	
March 5, 2004	Hidalgo	Touchstone Pictures	Carey Silver Productions
March 26, 2004	The Ladykillers	Touchstone Pictures	Tom Jacobson Productions
April 2, 2004	Home on the Range	Walt Disney Pictures	Walt Disney Feature Animation
April 9, 2004	The Alamo	Touchstone Pictures	Imagine Entertainment
April 22, 2004	Sacred Planet	Walt Disney Pictures	New Street Productions and Allied Films
May 28, 2004	Raising Helen	Touchstone Pictures	distribution outside free television, France, Italy and Japan only; Beacon Pictures, Hyde Park Entertainment and Mandeville Films
June 16, 2004	Around the World in 80 Days	Walt Disney Pictures	North American distribution only; Walden Media, Spanknyce Films and Mostow/Lieberman Productions
July 2, 2004	America's Heart and Soul	Walt Disney Pictures	Blacklight Films
July 7, 2004	King Arthur	Touchstone Pictures	Jerry Bruckheimer Films, World 2000 Entertainment and Green Hills Productions
July 30, 2004	The Village	Touchstone Pictures	
August 11, 2004	The Princess Diaries 2: Royal Engagement	Walt Disney Pictures	ShondaLand and Martin Chase Productions
September 17, 2004	Mr. 3000	Touchstone Pictures	Dimension Films, Spyglass Entertainment and The Kennedy/Marshall Company
September 24, 2004	The Last Shot	Touchstone Pictures	Mandeville Films
October 1, 2004	Ladder 49	Touchstone Pictures	distribution outside free television, France, Italy and Japan only; Beacon Pictures and Casey Silver Productions
November 5, 2004	The Incredibles	Walt Disney Pictures	Pixar Animation Studios
November 19, 2004	National Treasure	Walt Disney Pictures	Jerry Bruckheimer Films, Junction Entertainment and Saturn Films
December 25, 2004	The Life Aquatic with Steve Zissou	Touchstone Pictures	American Empirical Pictures
January 28, 2005	Aliens of the Deep	Walt Disney Pictures	Walden Media and Earthship Productions
February 11, 2005	Pooh's Heffalump Movie	Walt Disney Pictures	Disneytoon Studios
March 4, 2005	The Pacifier	Walt Disney Pictures	Spyglass Entertainment and Offspring Entertainment
March 18, 2005	Ice Princess	Walt Disney Pictures	Bridget Johnson Films and On The Ice Productions
April 22, 2005	A Lot like Love	Touchstone Pictures	distribution outside free television, France, Japan and Italy only; Beacon Pictures
April 29, 2005	The Hitchhiker's Guide to the Galaxy	Touchstone Pictures	Spyglass Entertainment, Hammer & Tongs and Everyman Pictures
June 10, 2005	Howl's Moving Castle	Walt Disney Studios	Japanese home media and North American, French and Southeast Asian distribution only; Studio Ghibli
June 22, 2005	Herbie: Fully Loaded	Walt Disney Pictures	Robert Simonds Productions
July 8, 2005	Dark Water	Touchstone Pictures	distribution outside Japan only; Vertigo Entertainment
July 29, 2005	Sky High	Walt Disney Pictures	Gunn Films
August 19, 2005	Valiant	Walt Disney Pictures	North American distribution only; Vanguard Animation, Ealing Studios, UK Film Council, Take Film Partnerships and Odyssey Entertainment
September 23, 2005	Flightplan	Touchstone Pictures	Imagine Entertainment
September 30, 2005	The Greatest Game Ever Played	Walt Disney Pictures	Fairway Films
October 21, 2005	Shopgirl	Touchstone Pictures	North American distribution only; Hyde Park Entertainment
November 4, 2005	Chicken Little	Walt Disney Pictures	Walt Disney Feature Animation
December 9, 2005	The Chronicles of Narnia: The Lion, the Witch and the Wardrobe	Walt Disney Pictures	Walden Media
December 25, 2005	Casanova	Touchstone Pictures	
January 13, 2006	Glory Road	Walt Disney Pictures	Jerry Bruckheimer Films, Texas Western Productions and Glory Road Productions
January 27, 2006	Roving Mars	Walt Disney Pictures	White Mountain Films and The Kennedy/Marshall Company
January 27, 2006	Annapolis	Touchstone Pictures	
February 17, 2006	Eight Below	Walt Disney Pictures	Spyglass Entertainment, Mandeville Films and The Kennedy/Marshall Company
March 10, 2006	The Shaggy Dog	Walt Disney Pictures	Mandeville Films, Robert Simonds Productions and Boxing Cat Films
March 24, 2006	Stay Alive	Hollywood Pictures	Spyglass Entertainment, Endgame Entertainment, and Wonderland Sound and Vision; North American distribution only
April 14, 2006	The Wild	Walt Disney Pictures	C.O.R.E. Feature Animation, Hoytyboy Pictures, Sir Zip Productions and Contrafilm
April 28, 2006	Stick It	Touchstone Pictures	distribution outside France, Portugal, Angola, Mozambique, Greece, Cyprus, Iceland, Poland, Hungary, the CIS, Israel, Australia and New Zealand only; Spyglass Entertainment
June 9, 2006	Cars	Walt Disney Pictures	Pixar Animation Studios
July 7, 2006	Pirates of the Caribbean: Dead Man's Chest	Walt Disney Pictures	Jerry Bruckheimer Films
August 11, 2006	Step Up	Touchstone Pictures	North American and Spanish distribution only; Summit Entertainment and Offspring Entertainment
August 25, 2006	Invincible	Walt Disney Pictures	Mayhem Pictures
September 29, 2006	The Guardian	Touchstone Pictures	distribution outside free television, France, Italy and Japan only; Beacon Communications and Flash Film Works
October 20, 2006	The Prestige	Touchstone Pictures	Warner Bros. Pictures, Newmarket Films and Syncopy; North American distribution only
November 3, 2006	The Santa Clause 3: The Escape Clause	Walt Disney Pictures	Outlaw Productions and Boxing Cat Productions
November 22, 2006	Deja Vu	Touchstone Pictures	Jerry Bruckheimer Films and Scott Free Productions
December 8, 2006	Apocalypto	Touchstone Pictures	North American distribution only; Icon Productions
January 12, 2007	Primeval	Hollywood Pictures	Pariah Films
February 16, 2007	Bridge to Terabithia	Walt Disney Pictures	North American, Australian and New Zealand distribution only; Walden Media
March 2, 2007	Wild Hogs	Touchstone Pictures	Tollin/Robbins Productions
March 30, 2007	Meet the Robinsons	Walt Disney Pictures	Walt Disney Animation Studios
April 27, 2007	The Invisible	Hollywood Pictures	distribution outside Germany, Austria, the Nordics, Portugal, Angola, Mozambique, South Africa, Greece, Cyprus, Poland, Hungary, Israel, Japan, French-language and Spanish-language television, Benelux pay television, Italian free television, and international airlines and ships only; Spyglass Entertainment
May 25, 2007	Pirates of the Caribbean: At World's End	Walt Disney Pictures	Jerry Bruckheimer Films
June 29, 2007	Ratatouille	Walt Disney Pictures	Pixar Animation Studios
August 3, 2007	Underdog	Walt Disney Pictures	Spyglass Entertainment, Classic Media and Maverick Films
August 28, 2007	The Pixar Story	Walt Disney Pictures	Leslie Iwerks Productions
September 28, 2007	The Game Plan	Walt Disney Pictures	Mayhem Pictures
October 26, 2007	Dan in Real Life	Touchstone Pictures	NALA Films and Focus Features; North American distribution only
November 21, 2007	Enchanted	Walt Disney Pictures	Right Coast Productions and Josephson Entertainment
December 21, 2007	National Treasure: Book of Secrets	Walt Disney Pictures	Jerry Bruckheimer Films, Junction Entertainment and Saturn Films
February 1, 2008	Hannah Montana and Miley Cyrus: Best of Both Worlds Concert	Walt Disney Pictures	PACE; limited release
February 14, 2008	Step Up 2: The Streets	Touchstone Pictures	North and Latin American and Spanish distribution only; Summit Entertainment
March 7, 2008	College Road Trip	Walt Disney Pictures	Gunn Films
May 16, 2008	The Chronicles of Narnia: Prince Caspian	Walt Disney Pictures	Walden Media
June 27, 2008	WALL-E	Walt Disney Pictures	Pixar Animation Studios
August 1, 2008	Swing Vote	Touchstone Pictures	North American distribution only; Treehouse Films, 1821 Pictures and Radar Pictures
September 26, 2008	Miracle at St. Anna	Touchstone Pictures	North American distribution only; 40 Acres and a Mule Filmworks, Rai Cinema and On My Own Produzioni Cinematografiche
October 3, 2008	Beverly Hills Chihuahua	Walt Disney Pictures	Mandeville Films
October 17, 2008	Morning Light	Walt Disney Pictures	limited release
October 24, 2008	High School Musical 3: Senior Year	Walt Disney Pictures	Borden and Rosenbush Entertainment
November 21, 2008	Bolt	Walt Disney Pictures	Walt Disney Animation Studios
December 25, 2008	Bedtime Stories	Walt Disney Pictures	Happy Madison Productions, Gunn Films, Offspring Entertainment and Conman & Izzy Productions
February 13, 2009	Confessions of a Shopaholic	Touchstone Pictures	Jerry Bruckheimer Films
February 27, 2009	Jonas Brothers: The 3D Concert Experience	Walt Disney Pictures	Jonas Films
March 13, 2009	Race to Witch Mountain	Walt Disney Pictures	Gunn Films
April 10, 2009	Hannah Montana: The Movie	Walt Disney Pictures	It's a Laugh Productions and Millar Gough Ink
April 22, 2009	Earth	Disneynature	North and Latin American and Italian distribution only; BBC Natural History Unit, BBC Worldwide, Discovery Channel and Greenlight Media AG
May 22, 2009	The Boys: The Sherman Brothers' Story	Walt Disney Pictures	Crescendo Productions, Red Hour Films and Traveling Light
May 29, 2009	Up	Walt Disney Pictures	Pixar Animation Studios
June 19, 2009	The Proposal	Touchstone Pictures	K/O Paper Products and Mandeville Films
July 24, 2009	G-Force	Walt Disney Pictures	Jerry Bruckheimer Films
August 14, 2009	Ponyo	Walt Disney Pictures	Japanese home media and North American and French distribution only; Studio Ghibli
August 21, 2009	X Games 3D: The Movie	ESPN Films	
September 9, 2009	Walt & El Grupo	Walt Disney Studios	Walt Disney Family Foundation Films and Theodore Thomas Productions; limited release
September 25, 2009	Surrogates	Touchstone Pictures	Mandeville Films, Top Shelf Productions and Brownstone Productions
November 6, 2009	A Christmas Carol	Walt Disney Pictures	ImageMovers Digital
November 25, 2009	Old Dogs	Walt Disney Pictures	Tapestry Films
December 11, 2009	The Princess and the Frog	Walt Disney Pictures	Walt Disney Animation Studios

== See also ==
- List of Disney feature-length home entertainment releases
- List of Disney television films
- List of Disney+ original films
- List of Hollywood Pictures films
- List of Lucasfilm productions
- List of Marvel Studios films
- List of Searchlight Pictures films
- List of 20th Century Studios films
- List of Touchstone Pictures films
- List of Walt Disney Pictures films
- Category:Lists of films by studio
