= List of HBO Max exclusive international distribution programming =

These series are programs that have aired on other networks where HBO Max has bought exclusive distribution rights to stream them in some regions on its own platform, although HBO Max lists them as Max Originals.

== TV series ==
=== Drama ===
Title	Genre	Original network	Original region	Premiere	Seasons	Runtime	Exclusive region	Language	Status
The Murders at White House Farm (Note: Currently unavailable)	Crime drama	ITV	United Kingdom	September 24, 2020	6 episodes	45–49 min	United States	English	Miniseries
Valley of Tears	War drama	Kan 11	Israel	November 12, 2020	10 episodes	42–48 min	All markets	Arabic; Hebrew	Miniseries
4 Blocks	Crime drama	TNT Serie	Germany	December 17, 2020	3 seasons, 19 episodes	44–59 min	United States	German	Ended
Gomorrah	Crime drama	Sky Atlantic	Italy	January 21, 2021	5 seasons, 58 episodes	41–58 min	United States	Italian; Neapolitan	Ended
Possessions	Psychological thriller	Canal+; yes	France; Israel	January 28, 2021	1 season, 6 episodes	49–54 min	United States	English; French; Hebrew	Ended
The Head (season 1)	Mystery thriller	HBO Asia; Hulu Japan; Orange TV	Japan; Spain	February 4, 2021	6 episodes	47–65 min	United States	Danish; English; Spanish; Swedish	Ended (Note: Season 2 is a co-production between HBO Max and Hulu Japan.)
Para – We Are King	Coming-of-age crime drama	TNT Serie (season 1); WarnerTV Serie (season 2)	Germany	October 26, 2021	2 seasons, 12 episodes	44–49 min	United States	German	Ended
Paradise	Science fiction mystery	Movistar+	Spain	October 28, 2021	2 seasons, 15 episodes	50–63 min	United States	Spanish	Ended
On the Job	Action thriller	HBO Asia	Philippines	January 20, 2022	6 episodes	45–63 min	Selected territories	Filipino	Miniseries
The Silence	Crime thriller	Croatian Radiotelevision	Croatia	April 12, 2022	2 seasons, 12 episodes	50–53 min	Central and Eastern Europe	Croatian; Russian; Ukrainian	Ended
Las Bravas F.C.	Sports drama	TNT	Mexico	May 5, 2022	2 seasons, 16 episodes	42–52 min	United States	Spanish	Ended
From	Science fiction horror	Epix (season 1); MGM+ (season 2–present)	United States	September 18, 2022	4 seasons, 40 episodes	45–59 min	Spain	English	Renewed for final season
Children of Evil	Crime thriller	HBO Europe	Serbia	November 2, 2023	1 season, 10 episodes	45–48 min	Central and Eastern Europe	Serbian	Ended
Scent of Time	Period fantasy romance	Youku	China	November 3, 2023	30 episodes	42–48 min	United States	Mandarin	Miniseries
I Know Your Soul	Crime drama	Moja TV	Bosnia and Herzegovina	November 23, 2023	6 episodes	50 min	Central and Eastern Europe	Bosnian	Miniseries

=== Comedy ===
Title	Genre	Original network	Original region	Premiere	Seasons	Runtime	Exclusive region	Language	Status
Frayed	Comedy drama	ABC TV; Sky One (season 1); Sky Comedy (season 2)	Australia; United Kingdom	July 30, 2020	2 seasons, 12 episodes	43–48 min	United States	English	Ended
Pure	Comedy drama	Channel 4	United Kingdom	August 27, 2020	1 season, 6 episodes	34–38 min	United States	English	Ended
Two Weeks to Live	Dark comedy/Crime thriller	Sky One	United Kingdom	November 5, 2020	6 episodes	25–26 min	United States	English	Miniseries
I Hate Suzie	Comedy drama	Sky Atlantic	United Kingdom	November 19, 2020	2 seasons, 11 episodes	32–41 min	United States	English	Ended
Arthur's Law	Dark comedy	TNT Serie	Germany	January 7, 2021	6 episodes	44–51 min	United States	German	Miniseries
Perfect Life (season 1)	Comedy drama	Movistar+	Spain	January 21, 2021	1 season, 8 episodes	27–34 min	United States	Spanish	Ended (Note: Season 2 was a co-production between HBO Max and Movistar+)
Starstruck	Comedy	BBC Three	United Kingdom	June 10, 2021	3 seasons, 18 episodes	20–25 min	United States	English	Ended
Queer You Are	Comedy drama	TNT	Spain	October 26, 2021	1 season, 6 episodes	23–30 min	Caribbean, Latin America, and United States	Spanish	Ended
I Don't Like Driving	Comedy	TNT	Spain	January 13, 2023	1 season, 6 episodes	23–29 min	United States	Spanish	Ended
German Genius	Comedy	WarnerTV Comedy	Germany	May 23, 2023	1 season, 8 episodes	28–33 min	United States	German	Pending
Boom Boom Bruno	Crime comedy	WarnerTV Serie	Germany	December 7, 2023	6 episodes	43–53 min	All other markets	German	Miniseries

=== Animation ===
==== Kids & family ====
Title	Genre	Original network	Original region	Premiere	Seasons	Runtime	Exclusive region	Language	Status
Love Monster	Fantasy comedy	CBeebies	United Kingdom	December 17, 2020	2 seasons, 54 episodes	7 min	United States	English	Ended (Note: Love Monster was renewed for a third season on CBeebies, but was removed from the HBO Max service prior to its premiere.)
Animaniacs	Slapstick comedy	Hulu	United States	August 14, 2021	2 season, 26 episodes	24–27 min	Latin America	English	Ended (Note: Animaniacs was renewed for a third season on Hulu, but was removed from the HBO Max service prior to its premiere.)
Odo	Comedy	Milkshake!; MiniMini+	United Kingdom; Poland	December 2, 2021	2 seasons, 26 episodes	7 min	United States	English	Ended
Dodo	Comedy	Sky Kids	United Kingdom	April 28, 2022	1 season, 20 episodes	7 min	United States	English	Ended
Isadora Moon	Fantasy	Sky Kids	United Kingdom	January 2, 2025	1 season, 50 episodes	11–22 min	United States	English	Pending
The Wonderfully Weird World of Gumball	Animated sitcom	Hulu	United States	October 6, 2025	2 seasons, 40 episodes	11–13 min	Selected territories	English	Renewed for seasons 3–4

=== Unscripted ===
==== Docuseries ====
Title	Subject	Original network	Original region	Premiere	Seasons	Runtime	Exclusive region	Language	Status
The Dog House: UK	Dog rescue	Channel 4	United Kingdom	July 23, 2020	5 seasons, 47 episodes	47–48 min	United States	English	Pending
Traffickers: Inside the Golden Triangle	True crime	HBO Asia	Thailand	March 24, 2022	3 episodes	59 min	Selected territories	English	Miniseries
La Narcosatánica	True crime	HBO Max	Latin America	July 14, 2023	3 episodes	42–50 min	United States	Spanish	Miniseries

==== Reality ====
Title	Genre	Original network	Original region	Premiere	Seasons	Runtime	Exclusive region	Language	Status
Singletown	Reality	ITV2	United Kingdom	August 20, 2020	1 season, 15 episodes	44–50 min	United States	English	Ended
The Great Pottery Throw Down	Game show	BBC Two (seasons 1–2); More4 (season 3); Channel 4 (seasons 4–5)	United Kingdom	September 17, 2020	5 seasons, 44 episodes	45–59 min	United States	English	Ended
All That Glitters	Reality competition	BBC Two	United Kingdom	June 24, 2021	1 season, 6 episodes	59 min	United States	English	Ended (Note: All That Glitters was renewed for a second season on BBC Two, but was removed from the HBO Max service prior to its premiere.)
MarkKim + Chef	Cooking show	HBO Asia	Thailand	August 18, 2023	10 episodes	30–37 min	United States	Thai	Miniseries
Deane's Dynasty	Reality	HBO Asia	Thailand	October 6, 2023	1 season, 8 episodes	31–36 min	United States	Thai	Ended

=== Continuations ===
Title	Genre	Prev. network(s)	Original network	Original region	Premiere	Seasons	Runtime	Exclusive region	Language	Status
Folklore (season 2)	Anthology horror	HBO	HBO Asia	Singapore	October 6, 2022	1 season, 7 episodes	44–61 min	Selected territories	Korean; Indonesian; Japanese; Malay; Mandarin; Singlish; Tagalog; Thai	Ended

== Films ==
=== Feature films ===
Title	Genre	Release date	Runtime	Language	Exclusive region
The Immortal	Crime drama	July 29, 2021	1 hr 56 min	Italian	United States
Single Mother by Choice	Drama	November 2, 2021	1 hr 22 min	English	United States
Son of Monarchs	Semi-autobiographical drama	November 2, 2021	1 hr 37 min	English; Spanish (original)	United States
The Killing of Kenneth Chamberlain	Thriller drama	November 19, 2021	1 hr 21 min	English	United States
La Pasión de Maradona	Drama	November 25, 2021	TBA	Spanish	United States
Júpiter	Drama	January 21, 2022	1 hour, 37 min	Portuguese	Selected territories
Brie's Bake Off Challenge	Comedy	April 1, 2022	1 hr 40 min	English	United States
Love and Baseball	Comedy drama	May 9, 2022	1 hr 28 min	English	United States
Nudo Mixteco	Drama	June 3, 2022	1 hr 31 min	Spanish	United States
The City of Wild Beasts	Drama	July 2, 2022	1 hr 37 min	Spanish	United States
We're All Going to the World's Fair	Coming-of-age horror drama	September 1, 2022	1 hr 25 min	English	United States
Self Reliance	Comedy thriller	March 15, 2025	1 hr 27 min	English	Hong Kong, Southeast Asia and Taiwan
The Invisible Guest	Mystery thriller	August 7, 2026	2 hr 1 min	Indonesian	Hong Kong, Southeast Asia and Taiwan

=== Documentaries ===
Title	Subject	Release date	Runtime	Language	Exclusive region
Lucy the Human Chimp	Animals	April 29, 2021	1 hr 8 min	English	United States

=== Specials ===
Title	Genre	Release date	Runtime	Language	Exclusive region
Namoo	Animation short	January 27, 2022	12 min	English	United States
The Dress	Drama short	March 23, 2022	30 min	Polish	United States

== Upcoming ==
=== TV series ===
==== Drama ====
Title	Genre	Original network	Original region	Premiere	Seasons	Runtime	Exclusive region	Language	Status
Kill Jackie	Action thriller	Amazon Prime Video	United Kingdom	2026	1 season, 8 episodes	TBA	Belgium, France, Nordics, Portugal, and Spain	English	Post-production
