= List of ITC Entertainment films =

This is a list of films produced/distributed by the defunct British television company, ITC Entertainment. This list also includes films distributed by Associated Film Distribution.

== 1970s ==
Release Date	Title	Notes	Ref
September 22, 1971	Desperate Characters	Distributed by Paramount Pictures	
May 24, 1972	The Possession of Joel Delaney	Distributed by Paramount Pictures	
July 11, 1974	The Tamarind Seed	Co-production with Lorimar Film Entertainment; Distributed by Avco Embassy Pictures	
April 30, 1975	Dogpound Shuffle	Distributed by Paramount Pictures	
May 21, 1975	The Return of the Pink Panther	Distributed by United Artists; Nominee of the Golden Globe Award for Best Motion Picture - Musical or Comedy	(Note: rights shared by MGM and ITV Studios)
August 8, 1975	Farewell, My Lovely	Distributed by Avco Embassy Pictures in the US Fox-Rank in the UK	
March 5, 1976	Man Friday	Distributed by Avco Embassy Pictures in the US Fox-Rank in the UK	
October 8, 1976	The Cassandra Crossing	Distributed by Avco Embassy Pictures in North America and 20th Century-Fox internationally	
December 22, 1976	Voyage of the Damned	Distributed by Avco Embassy Pictures in the US Rank Film Distributors in the UK; Nominee of the Golden Globe Award for Best Motion Picture - Drama	
December 25, 1976	The Eagle Has Landed	Distributed by Columbia Pictures	
January 28, 1977	Cross of Iron	Distributed by EMI Films	
June 2, 1977	The Domino Principle	Distributed by Avco Embassy Pictures	
August 5, 1977	March or Die	Distributed by Columbia Pictures	
December 17, 1977	Capricorn One	Distributed by Warner Bros.	
March 13, 1978	The Big Sleep	Distributed by United Artists	
April 14, 1978	The Medusa Touch	Distributed by Warner Bros.	
October 5, 1978	The Boys from Brazil	Distributed by 20th Century Fox	
October 8, 1978	Autumn Sonata	Distributed by New World Pictures	
November 1978	Movie Movie	Distributed by Warner Bros. Nominee of the Golden Globe Award for Best Motion Picture - Musical or Comedy	
April 27, 1979	Firepower	Co-production with Michel Winner Productions; Distributed by Associated Film Distribution	
June 6, 1979	Escape to Athena	Distributed by Associated Film Distribution	
June 22, 1979	The Muppet Movie	Co-production with Henson Associates; Distributed by Universal Pictures and Associated Film Distribution (Note: rights now owned by Walt Disney Studios via Walt Disney Pictures and The Muppets Studio with Walt Disney Studios Motion Pictures currently handling distribution); Inducted into the National Film Registry in 2009	
September 14, 1979	Love and Bullets	Distributed by Associated Film Distribution	
December 7, 1979	Killer Fish	Distributed by Associated Film Distribution	

== 1980s ==
Release Date	Title	Notes	Ref
February 15, 1980	Saturn 3	Distributed by Associated Film Distribution	
February 22, 1980	Blood Feud	Distributed by Associated Film Distribution	
March 28, 1980	The Changeling	Co-production with Carolco Pictures	
June 20, 1980	Can't Stop the Music	Co-production with EMI Films	
August 1, 1980	Raise the Titanic	Distributed by Associated Film Distribution	
October 17, 1980	Times Square	Co-production with Butterfly Valley N.Y., EMI Films, Robert Stigwood Organization; Distributed by Associated Film Distribution	
December 18, 1980	Hawk the Slayer		
December 19, 1980	Inside Moves	Distributed by Associated Film Distribution	
December 19, 1980	The Jazz Singer	Co-production with EMI Films	
December 19, 1980	Borderline	Co-production with Marble Arch Productions; Distributed by Associated Film Distribution	
December 19, 1980	The Mirror Crack'd	Co-production with EMI Films	
April 1981	Hard Country	Distributed by Associated Film Distribution	
April 23, 1981	Gregory's Girl		
April 25, 1981	The Salamander		
May 1981	Green Ice		
May 22, 1981	The Legend of the Lone Ranger	Co-production with Eaves Movie Ranch, Wrather Productions; Distributed by Universal Pictures and Associated Film Distribution	
June 26, 1981	The Great Muppet Caper	Co-production with Henson Associates; Distributed by Universal Pictures and Associated Film Distribution	
June 30, 1981	From the Life of the Marionettes	Distributed by Associated Film Distribution	
August 21, 1981	Honky Tonk Freeway	Co-production with EMI Films, Honky Tonk Freeway Company and Kendon Films; Distributed by Universal Pictures and Associated Film Distribution	
December 4, 1981	On Golden Pond	Co-production with IPC Films; Distributed by Universal Pictures and Associated Film Distribution; Nominee of the Academy Award for Best Picture	
February 19, 1982	Barbarosa	Distributed by Universal Pictures and Associated Film Distribution	
March 5, 1982	Evil Under the Sun	Co-production with EMI Films, Titan Productions and Mersham Productions Ltd.; Distributed by Columbia-EMI-Warner, Universal Pictures and Associated Film Distribution;	
November 19, 1982	The Last Unicorn	Co-production with Rankin/Bass and Topcraft; distributed by Jensen Farley Pictures	
December 3, 1982	Frances	Co-production with EMI Films and Brooksfilms; Distributed by Universal Pictures, Associated Film Distribution and Columbia-EMI-Warner	
December 8, 1982	Sophie's Choice	Co-production with Keith Barish Productions; Distributed by Universal Pictures and Associated Film Distribution; Nominee of the Golden Globe Award for Best Motion Picture - Drama	
December 17, 1982	The Dark Crystal	Co-production with Henson Associates; Distributed by Universal Pictures and Associated Film Distribution	
February 1983	Second Thoughts	Co-production with David Foster Productions and EMI Films; Distributed by Universal Pictures and Associated Film Distribution	
March 4, 1983	Tender Mercies	Co-production with Antron Media Production and EMI Films; Distributed by Universal Pictures and Associated Film Distribution; Nominee of the Academy Award for Best Picture; Nominee of the Golden Globe Award for Best Motion Picture - Drama	
March 25, 1983	Bad Boys	Co-production with EMI Films and Solofilm; Distributed by Universal Pictures and Associated Film Distribution	
May 1983	Slayground	Co-production with Jennie and Company Thorn EMI Screen Entertainment; Distributed by Columbia-EMI-Warner, Universal Pictures; Associated Film Distribution	
December 1983	Cross Creek	Co-production with Thorn EMI Screen Entertainment; Distributed by Universal Pictures and Associated Film Distribution	
April 6, 1984	Where the Boys Are '84	Distributed by TriStar Pictures	
September 14, 1984	The Evil That Men Do	Distributed by TriStar Pictures	
September 15, 1984	The Company of Wolves	Distributed by The Cannon Group, Inc.	
March 28, 1985	Robbery Under Arms		
January 23, 1987	The Stepfather	Distributed by New Century Vista Film Company	
July 10, 1987	The Brave Little Toaster	UK Theatrical Distribution only, produced by Hyperion Animation and The Kushner-Locke Company, along with titles & opticals by Walt Disney Pictures Distributed by Atlantic Releasing Corporation/Skouras Pictures (theatrical) and The Walt Disney Company/Buena Vista Pictures (home video/television) in the USA	
May 6, 1988	Whoops Apocalypse	Distributed by Metro-Goldwyn-Mayer in the USA	
June 21, 1988	Backfire		
August 11, 1988	A Summer Story	Co-production with Atlantic Entertainment Group	
October 21, 1988	Without a Clue	Co-production with Orion Pictures	
November 27, 1988	A Dangerous Life	Co-production with Australian Broadcasting Corporation, Central Independent Television via Zenith Entertainment, Home Box Office	,
October 20, 1989	The Last Warrior	Co-production with Label Productions and Martin Wragge Production; distributed by SVS Films	
November 3, 1989	Stepfather II	Distributed by Miramax under Millimeter Films label	
November 25, 1989 US release (produced and released in the UK in 1985)	Billy the Kid and the Green Baize Vampire	Co-produced with Zenith Entertainment and Channel 4	

== 1990s ==
Release Date	Title	Notes	Ref
April 14, 1990	Zapped Again!		
October 12, 1990	Welcome Home, Roxy Carmichael	Distributed by Paramount Pictures	
July 18, 1991	Zandalee		
December 10, 1991	Wedlock		
June 4, 1992	Stepfather III	Made-for-TV release	
January 9, 1993	Trouble Bound		
January 24, 1993	Fear of a Black Hat	Distributed by The Samuel Goldwyn Company	
May 26, 1993	Doppelganger		
November 17, 1993	Ed and His Dead Mother		
October 26, 1994	The Last Seduction	Distributed by October Films	
April 11, 1997	Keys to Tulsa	Co-production with PolyGram Filmed Entertainment	
