= List of Legendary Pictures films =

Legendary Pictures has produced 75 feature films. In addition, the company is also in the process of producing an additional five films and is developing various other projects. Of the 75 feature films produced, 58 have had theatrical releases, one has had a direct-to-video release, and four have had video on demand releases. Note that in most cases the distributor or distributors also co-produced the film. The box office column reflects the worldwide gross for the theatrical release of the film in United States dollars, not adjusted for inflation.

== Films ==
Year	Title	Director	Co-production company(s)	Distributor(s)	Box office	Ref.
June 28, 2006	Superman Returns	Bryan Singer	DC Comics / Peters Entertainment / Bad Hat Harry	Warner Bros. Pictures	$391,081,192	
July 21, 2006	Lady in the Water	M. Night Shyamalan	Blinding Edge Pictures	Warner Bros. Pictures	$72,785,169	
July 28, 2006	The Ant Bully	John A. Davis	Playtone / DNA Productions	Warner Bros. Pictures	$55,181,129	
August 25, 2006	Beerfest	Jay Chandrasekhar	Gerber Pictures / Cataland Films / Broken Lizard	Warner Bros. Pictures	$20,387,597	
December 22, 2006	We Are Marshall	McG	Thunder Road Pictures / Wonderland Sound and Vision	Warner Bros. Pictures	$43,545,364	
March 9, 2007	300	Zack Snyder	Virtual Studios / Atmosphere Pictures / Hollywood Gang	Warner Bros. Pictures	$456,068,181	
March 7, 2008	10,000 BC	Roland Emmerich	Centropolis Entertainment	Warner Bros. Pictures	$269,784,201	
July 18, 2008	The Dark Knight	Christopher Nolan	DC Comics / Syncopy	Warner Bros. Pictures	$1,003,045,358	
March 6, 2009	Watchmen	Zack Snyder	DC Comics / Lawrence Gordon/Lloyd Levin Productions	Warner Bros. Pictures (North America) / Paramount Pictures (International)	$185,258,983	
April 17, 2009	Observe and Report	Jody Hill	DeLine Pictures	Warner Bros. Pictures	$26,973,554	
June 5, 2009	The Hangover	Todd Phillips	Green Hat Films / BenderSpink	Warner Bros. Pictures	$467,483,912	
October 6, 2009	Trick 'r Treat	Michael Dougherty	Bad Hat Harry / Warner Premiere	Warner Bros. Pictures	—N/a	
October 16, 2009	Where the Wild Things Are	Spike Jonze	Village Roadshow Pictures / Playtone / Wild Things Productions	Warner Bros. Pictures	$100,086,793	
November 25, 2009	Ninja Assassin	James McTeigue	Dark Castle Entertainment / Silver Pictures / Anarchos Productions	Warner Bros. Pictures	$61,601,280	
April 2, 2010	Clash of the Titans	Louis Leterrier	Thunder Road Pictures / The Zanuck Company	Warner Bros. Pictures	$493,214,993	
June 18, 2010	Jonah Hex	Jimmy Hayward	DC Comics / Mad Chance / Weed Road Pictures	Warner Bros. Pictures	$10,903,312	
July 16, 2010	Inception	Christopher Nolan	Syncopy	Warner Bros. Pictures	$825,532,764	
September 17, 2010	The Town	Ben Affleck	GK Films / Thunder Road Pictures	Warner Bros. Pictures	$154,026,136	
November 5, 2010	Due Date	Todd Phillips	Green Hat Films	Warner Bros. Pictures	$211,780,824	
March 25, 2011	Sucker Punch	Zack Snyder	Cruel and Unusual Films	Warner Bros. Pictures	$89,792,502	
May 27, 2011	The Hangover Part II	Todd Phillips	Green Hat Films / BenderSpink	Warner Bros. Pictures	$586,764,305	
March 30, 2012	Wrath of the Titans	Jonathan Liebesman	Thunder Road Pictures / Cott Productions / Furia de Titanes II A.I.E.	Warner Bros. Pictures	$305,270,083	
July 20, 2012	The Dark Knight Rises	Christopher Nolan	DC Entertainment / Syncopy	Warner Bros. Pictures	$1,084,439,099	
March 1, 2013	Jack the Giant Slayer	Bryan Singer	New Line Cinema / Original Film / Big Kid Pictures / Bad Hat Harry	Warner Bros. Pictures	$197,687,603	
April 12, 2013	42	Brian Helgeland	—N/a	Warner Bros. Pictures	$97,470,701	
May 24, 2013	The Hangover Part III	Todd Phillips	Green Hat Films / BenderSpink	Warner Bros. Pictures	$362,000,072	
June 14, 2013	Man of Steel	Zack Snyder	DC Entertainment / Syncopy / Peters Entertainment	Warner Bros. Pictures	$668,045,518	
July 12, 2013	Pacific Rim	Guillermo del Toro	Double Dare You	Warner Bros. Pictures	$411,002,906	
March 7, 2014	300: Rise of an Empire	Noam Murro	Cruel and Unusual Films / Atmosphere Pictures / Hollywood Gang / RatPac Entertainment	Warner Bros. Pictures	$337,580,051	
May 16, 2014	Godzilla	Gareth Edwards	RatPac Entertainment	Warner Bros. Pictures (Worldwide) / Toho (Japan)	$529,076,069	
August 29, 2014	As Above, So Below	John Erick Dowdle	Brothers Dowdle	Universal Pictures	$41,898,409	
October 24, 2014	Dracula Untold	Gary Shore	Michael De Luca Productions	Universal Pictures	$217,124,280	
November 7, 2014	Interstellar	Christopher Nolan	Syncopy / Lynda Obst Productions / RatPac Entertainment	Paramount Pictures (North America) / Warner Bros. Pictures (International)	$675,120,017	
December 25, 2014	Unbroken	Angelina Jolie	Jolie Pas / 3 Arts Entertainment	Universal Pictures	$163,278,357	
January 16, 2015	Blackhat	Michael Mann	Forward Pass	Universal Pictures	$19,589,056	
February 6, 2015	Seventh Son	Sergei Bodrov	Thunder Road Pictures / Wigram Productions	Universal Pictures	$114,178,613	
March 27, 2015	Dead Rising: Watchtower (Note: Legendary Digital Media was the production company on this film.)	Zach Lipovsky	Contradiction Films / Di Bonaventura Digital	Crackle / Content Media	—N/a	
June 12, 2015	Jurassic World	Colin Trevorrow	Amblin Entertainment / The Kennedy/Marshall Company	Universal Pictures	$1,670,400,637	
August 14, 2015	Straight Outta Compton	F. Gary Gray	New Line Cinema / Cube Vision / Crucial Films / Broken Chair Flickz	Universal Pictures	$201,634,991	
September 14, 2015	The Hive	David Yarovesky	Midnight Road Entertainment / Witness Protection Films	Nerdist Industries	—N/a	
October 23, 2015	Steve Jobs	Danny Boyle	Scott Rudin Productions / Mark Gordon Company / Entertainment 360 / Decibel Films / Cloud Eight Films	Universal Pictures	$34,441,873	
October 16, 2015	Crimson Peak	Guillermo del Toro	Double Dare You	Universal Pictures	$74,679,822	
December 4, 2015	Krampus	Michael Dougherty	Zam Pictures	Universal Pictures	$61,548,707	
April 20, 2015	Fastball	Jonathan Hock	Major League Baseball	Gravitas Ventures	—N/a	
June 17, 2016	Warcraft	Duncan Jones	Atlas Entertainment / Blizzard Entertainment / Tencent Pictures / H. Brothers / Taihe Entertainment	Universal Pictures (Note: Beginning with Warcraft, all films produced by Legendary Pictures except Jurassic World films (owned by Universal Pictures), are distributed by Legendary East in China.)	$439,048,914	
June 20, 2016	Dead Rising: Endgame	Pat Williams	DR2 / Contradiction Films	Crackle	—N/a	
October 12, 2016	The Thinning	Michael Gallagher	Cinemand/kidsatplay	YouTube Red	—N/a	
December 9, 2016	Spectral	Nic Mathieu	Universal Pictures	Netflix	—N/a	
February 17, 2017	The Great Wall (Note: Legendary East was the production company on this film.)	Zhang Yimou	Atlas Entertainment / Le Vision Pictures	Universal Pictures	$334,993,831	
March 10, 2017	Kong: Skull Island	Jordan Vogt-Roberts	Tencent Pictures / RatPac Entertainment	Warner Bros. Pictures	$566,652,812	
May 19, 2017	Flesh and Sand	Alejandro González Iñárritu	ILMxLAB / Fondazione Prada	Distribution only	—N/a	
March 23, 2018	Pacific Rim Uprising	Steven S. DeKnight	Double Dare You	Universal Pictures	$290,930,148	
June 22, 2018	Jurassic World: Fallen Kingdom	J. A. Bayona	Amblin Entertainment / Perfect World Pictures / The Kennedy/Marshall Company / Apaches Entertainment	Universal Pictures	$1,308,467,944	
July 13, 2018	Skyscraper	Rawson Marshall Thurber	Flynn Picture Company / Seven Bucks Productions	Universal Pictures	$304,868,961	
July 20, 2018	Mamma Mia! Here We Go Again	Ol Parker	Littlestar / Playtone / Perfect World Pictures	Universal Pictures	$402,264,003	
August 10, 2018	BlacKkKlansman	Spike Lee	Blumhouse Productions / Monkeypaw Productions / 40 Acres and a Mule Filmworks / QC Entertainment / Perfect World Pictures	Focus Features (United States) / Universal Pictures (International)	$93,400,823	
October 17, 2018	The Thinning: New World Order	Michael Gallagher	Cinemand / The Mark Gordon Company / Entertainment One	YouTube Originals	—N/a	
April 12, 2019	Little	Tina Gordon Chism	Will Packer Productions / Perfect World Pictures	Universal Pictures	$48,987,096	
May 3, 2019	Pokémon Detective Pikachu	Rob Letterman	The Pokémon Company / Toho	Warner Bros. Pictures (Worldwide) / Toho (Japan)	$433,005,346	
May 31, 2019	Godzilla: King of the Monsters	Michael Dougherty	Huahua Media	Warner Bros. Pictures (Worldwide) / Toho (Japan)	$386,600,138	
September 23, 2020	Enola Holmes	Harry Bradbeer	PCMA Productions	Netflix	—N/a	
September 23, 2020	Console Wars (Note: Legendary Television was the production company on this film.)	Jonah Tulis / Blake J. Harris	CBS Television Studios / Point Grey Pictures	Paramount+	—N/a	
March 31, 2021	Godzilla vs. Kong	Adam Wingard	—N/a	Warner Bros. Pictures (Worldwide) / Toho (Japan)	$470,067,014	
October 22, 2021	Dune	Denis Villeneuve	Villeneuve Films	Warner Bros. Pictures	$401,847,900	
February 25, 2022	Texas Chainsaw Massacre	David Blue Garcia	Bad Hombre / Exurbia Films	Netflix	—N/a	
March 4, 2022	Fresh	Mimi Cave	Searchlight Pictures / Hyperobject Industries	Hulu (United States) / Disney+ (Worldwide)	—N/a	
November 4, 2022	Enola Holmes 2	Harry Bradbeer	PCMA Productions	Netflix	—N/a	
November 17, 2022	A Christmas Story Christmas	Clay Kaytis	Warner Bros. Pictures / Wild West Picture Show Productions / Toberoff Productions	HBO Max	—N/a	
May 26, 2023	The Machine	Peter Atencio	Screen Gems / Uh Hundred Percent Productions / Levity Productions	Sony Pictures Releasing	$10,664,328	
January 12, 2024	The Book of Clarence	Jeymes Samuel	TriStar Pictures / Kilburn Lane	Sony Pictures Releasing	$6,132,813	
March 1, 2024	Dune: Part Two	Denis Villeneuve	Villeneuve Films	Warner Bros. Pictures	$714,844,358	
March 29, 2024	Godzilla x Kong: The New Empire	Adam Wingard	—N/a	Warner Bros. Pictures (Worldwide) / Toho (Japan)	$572,050,016	
October 11, 2024	Brothers	Max Barbakow	Mad Chance Productions / Brolin Productions / Estuary Films	Amazon MGM Studios	—N/a	
April 4, 2025	A Minecraft Movie	Jared Hess	Mojang Studios / Vertigo Entertainment / On the Roam	Warner Bros. Pictures	$961,187,780	
June 11, 2025	Blue Scuti: Tetris Crasher	Chris Moukarbel	Prodigy PMC	Wonder Project / Amazon MGM Studios	—N/a	
August 29, 2025	The Toxic Avenger	Macon Blair	Troma Entertainment	Cineverse / Iconic Events Releasing	$3,481,520	
April 10, 2026	Faces of Death	Daniel Goldhaber	Angry Films / Divide/Conquer	Independent Film Company / Shudder	$2,148,534	
July 1, 2026	Enola Holmes 3	Philip Barantini	PCMA Productions	Netflix	—N/a	
October 2, 2026	Digger	Alejandro G. Iñárritu	TC Productions / M Productions	Warner Bros. Pictures (Note: Unless specified, all films since 2026 that will be distributed by Warner Bros. Pictures and Paramount Pictures are both distributed by Towa Pictures in Japan.)	$50,850,116	
October 16, 2026	Street Fighter	Kitao Sakurai	Capcom	Paramount Pictures (Worldwide) / Toho (Japan)	$100,936,563	

== Upcoming films ==
Year	Title	Director	Co-production company(s)	Distributor
December 18, 2026	Dune: Part Three	Denis Villeneuve	Villeneuve Films	Warner Bros. Pictures
January 22, 2027	Animal Friends	Peter Atencio	Maximum Effort / Prime Focus Studios	Warner Bros. Pictures
March 26, 2027	Godzilla x Kong: Supernova	Grant Sputore	Toho	Warner Bros. Pictures (Worldwide) / Toho (Japan)
July 23, 2027	A Minecraft Movie Squared	Jared Hess	Mojang Studios / Vertigo Entertainment / On the Roam	Warner Bros. Pictures

=== Undated ===
Title	Director	Co-production company(s)	Distributor
The Alchemist	TBA	TriStar Pictures / PalmStar Media	Sony Pictures Releasing
God Country	Jim Mickle	AfterShock Media / Nightshade	Netflix
Gundam	Jim Mickle	Bandai Namco Filmworks / Nightshade	Netflix
My Hero Academia	Shinsuke Sato	Toho	Netflix
Alchemised	TBA	TBA	TBA
Ancient Aliens	Josh Heald	Counterbalance Entertainment	TBA
Bitter Root	Regina King	Royal Ties / Proximity Media	TBA
Untitled Buck Rogers film	TBA	TBA	TBA
By All	Steven Caple Jr.	The Gotham Group	TBA
Danny and the Dinosaur	TBA	HarperCollins Productions	TBA
Untitled Detective Pikachu sequel	Jordan Vogt-Roberts	The Pokémon Company	TBA
Devolution	James Ashcroft	TBA	TBA
Duke Nukem	TBA	Counterbalance Entertainment / Marla Studio	TBA
Ferryman	Kelly Marcel	TBA	TBA
Untitled Heathcliff film	TBA	TBA	TBA
Homewreckers	Craig Gillespie	TBA	TBA
How to Sell a Haunted House	James Ashcroft	Ghost House Pictures / Aperture Entertainment	TBA
The Last Adventure of Constance Verity	Atsuko Hirayanagi	TBA	TBA
The Magic School Bus	Rob Letterman	Scholastic Entertainment / Brownstone Productions / Marc Platt Productions	TBA
Magic: The Gathering	Matt Johnson	Hasbro Entertainment	TBA
Nuclear War: A Scenario	Denis Villeneuve	Villeneuve Films	TBA
Party & Prey	Patrick Brice	AfterShock Media	TBA
Poppy Playtime	TBA	Mob Entertainment / Angry Films	TBA
Suburban Hell	TBA	Feigco Entertainment / Ghost House Pictures	TBA
