= List of films produced by CBS =

Listing for films produced by the motion picture divisions of CBS (a subsidiary of Skydance Corporation), includes Cinema Center Films, CBS Theatrical Films and CBS Films.

== Copyright status ==
Currently, the rights to all of these films are owned by Paramount Pictures (through Viacom's acquisition of CBS in 2000), while the CCF and CTF films are distributed by Paramount Home Entertainment in the home media market. As for CBS Films, Sony Pictures Worldwide Acquisitions held the American home entertainment distribution rights and the foreign theatrical and home entertainment distribution rights from 2010 to 2019. Paramount now owns the rights to CBS Films for all pre-2015 films after the re-merger of CBS and Viacom in 2019, while Lionsgate owns the distribution rights for the 2015–2019 releases.

== Cinema Center Films ==
Release date	Title	Notes
August 7, 1968	With Six You Get Eggroll	Co-production with Arwin Productions, Inc.
May 28, 1969	The April Fools	Co-production with Jalem Productions, Inc.
July 13, 1969	Me, Natalie	Co-production with Nob Hill Productions
October 4, 1969	Hail, Hero!	Co-production with Halcyon Productions
October 6, 1969	The Royal Hunt of the Sun	Co-production with Security Pictures
December 4, 1969	A Boy Named Charlie Brown	Co-production with Lee Mendelson/Bill Melendez Productions and United Feature Syndicate
December 25, 1969	The Reivers	Co-production with Duo Productions and Solar Productions, Inc.
March 17, 1970	The Boys in the Band	
April 29, 1970	A Man Called Horse	Co-production with Sandy Howard Productions Corp.
July 22, 1970	Something for Everyone	Co-production with Media Productions
August 14, 1970	Darker than Amber	
September 22, 1970	Adam at 6 A.M.	Co-production with Solar Productions
September 30, 1970	Homer	Co-production with Palomar Pictures
November 5, 1970	Scrooge	
December 17, 1970	Rio Lobo	Co-production with Malabar Productions
December 23, 1970	Little Big Man	
May 26, 1971	Big Jake	Co-production with Batjac Productions, Inc.
June 1, 1971	Blue Water, White Death	Co-production with Blue Water Film Corporation Productions
June 15, 1971	Who Is Harry Kellerman and Why Is He Saying Those Terrible Things About Me?	
June 23, 1971	Le Mans	Co-production with Solar Productions
July 18, 1971	Figures in a Landscape	Co-production with Cinecrest Film Ltd.
October 1, 1971	Come to Your Senses	Co-production with Prana-Mendelson Productions
October 1971	The African Elephant	Co-production with Dartmouth Productions
November 11, 1971	Something Big	Co-production with Stanmore Productions, Inc. and Penbar Productions, Inc.
November 24, 1971	The Christian Licorice Store	
March 1972	The Little Ark	Co-production with Robert B. Radnitz Productions Ltd.
June 2, 1972	The War Between Men and Women	Co-production with Jalem Productions, Inc. and Lienroc Productions
June 21, 1972	The Revengers	Co-production with Estudios Churubusco Azteca S.A.
June 28, 1972	Prime Cut	Co-production with Wizan Productions
August 9, 1972	Snoopy Come Home	Co-production with Lee Mendelson Film Productions, Inc. and Bill Melendez Productions

=== Unmade projects ===
Release date	Title	Notes
1967	The Apollo of Bellac	Based on the play by Jean Giradou
1967	Contrast	Based on two short stories by W. Somerset Maugham
1967	Nelly Bly	Biopic of the famous reporter
1968	Treasure Island	Musical adaptation by Elliot Kastner and Jerry Gershwin
1971	Yucatan	Motorcycle adventure starring Steve McQueen
1971	Man on a Nylon String	Adventure tale set in the Alps, to be made by Solar Productions, but not starring Steve McQueen
1971	Applegate's Gold	Western for Solar Productions
1972	Valley Forge	Based on the play by Maxwell Anderson, directed by John Ford and Frank Capra
1970s	Cutting Loose	Unreleased documentary

== CBS Theatrical Films ==
Release date	Title
March 13, 1981	Back Roads
July 23, 1982	The Challenge
February 18, 1983	Table for Five
May 18, 1984	Finders Keepers
August 3, 1984	Grandview, U.S.A.
September 21, 1984	Windy City
October 26, 1984	American Dreamer
August 23, 1985	Better Off Dead
September 26, 1985	The Lightship
November 1, 1985	Eleni
November 8, 1985	Target

=== Cancelled film ===
Starblasters was to be a video game-themed movie, due to be released about Christmas time 1982, at least some of the film was to be computer-animated. It would have been the second video game-themed movie after Tron which was released in July of that year.

== CBS Films ==
Release date	Title	Budget	Gross (worldwide)	Notes
January 22, 2010	Extraordinary Measures	$30 million	$15.1 million	Co-production with Double Feature Films
April 23, 2010	The Back-up Plan	$35 million	$77.5 million	Co-production with Escape Artists
November 24, 2010	Faster	$24 million	$35.5 million	Co-production with TriStar Pictures and Castle Rock Entertainment
January 28, 2011	The Mechanic	$40 million	$51.0 million	Co-production with Millennium Films
March 4, 2011	Beastly	$17 million	$43.1 million	
February 3, 2012	The Woman in Black	$13 million	$127.7 million	American distribution only, produced by Hammer Pictures, UK Film Council, Alliance Films, Exclusive Media Group and Cross Creek Pictures
March 9, 2012	Salmon Fishing in the Yemen	$14.5 million	$34.6 million	American distribution only, produced by Lionsgate UK, UK Film Council and BBC Films
September 7, 2012	The Words	$6 million	$13.2 million	
October 12, 2012	Seven Psychopaths	$15 million	$33 million	Co-production with the British Film Institute, Blueprint Pictures and Film4 Productions
March 1, 2013	The Last Exorcism Part II	$5 million	$15.2 million	Co-production with StudioCanal and Strike Entertainment
May 31, 2013	The Kings of Summer	$1.5 million	$1.4 million	Co-production with Big Beach Films
July 26, 2013	The To Do List	$1.5 million	$3.9 million	
November 1, 2013	Last Vegas	$28 million	$134.4 million	Co-production with Good Universe
December 6, 2013	Inside Llewyn Davis	$11 million	$13+ million	American distribution only, produced by StudioCanal, Scott Rudin Productions, and Mike Zoss Productions
April 4, 2014	Afflicted	$318,000	$121,200	Co-production with Entertainment One and IM Global
April 25, 2014	Gambit	$10.2 million	$14.2 million	American home video distribution only
August 15, 2014	What If	$11 million	$7.8 million	American distribution only, produced by Entertainment One and Telefilm Canada
September 26, 2014	Pride	$12 million	$16.7 million	American distribution only, co-production with 20th Century Fox, BBC Films, British Film Institute, Canal+, Ciné+, Ingenious Media and Pathé
February 20, 2015	The DUFF	$8.5 million	$43.5 million	Co-production with Wonderland Sound and Vision and Vast Entertainment
November 13, 2015	Love the Coopers	$24 million	$41.1 million	Co-production with Groundswell Productions, Imagine Entertainment, and Handwritten Films
March 25, 2016	Get a Job	$8 million	$23,910	Co-production with Lionsgate Premiere and Double Feature Films
April 12, 2016	Flight 7500		$2.8 million	Co-distribution with Lionsgate Films
August 12, 2016	Hell or High Water	$12 million	$37.9 million	Co-production with Sidney Kimmel Entertainment, Odd Lot Entertainment, Film 44, and LBI Entertainment
October 7, 2016	Middle School: The Worst Years of My Life	$8.5 million	$23.3 million	Co-production with Lionsgate Films, James Patterson Entertainment, and Participant Media
December 21, 2016	Patriots Day	$40 million	$52.4 million	Co-distribution with Lionsgate Films
March 10, 2017	The Sense of an Ending		$4.8 million	Co-distribution with Lionsgate
June 2, 2017	Dean	$950,000	$254,536	International distribution by Universal Pictures
September 15, 2017	American Assassin	$33 million	$66.7 million	Co-production with Lionsgate Films and di Bonaventura Pictures
February 2, 2018	Winchester	$3.5 million	$44 million	US and UK Co-distribution with Lionsgate Films only
September 28, 2018	Hell Fest	$5.5 million	$18.2 million	Co-production with Valhalla Entertainment and Tucker Tooley Entertainment
November 16, 2018	At Eternity's Gate		$11.5 million	Co-production with Iconoclast and Riverstone Pictures
March 15, 2019	Five Feet Apart	$7 million	$92.6 million	Co-distribution with Lionsgate Films
June 7, 2019	Pavarotti		$8.6 million	American distribution only, produced by PolyGram Entertainment, Imagine Entertainment, Decca Records and White Horse Pictures
August 9, 2019	Scary Stories to Tell in the Dark	$25 million	$104.5 million	Co-production with Lionsgate Films and Entertainment One
September 6, 2019	Strange but True			Co-production with Lionsgate Films
October 11, 2019	Jexi	$5 million	$9.2 million	Co-Production with Lionsgate Films And Entertainment One Last cinema release.
