= List of Gaumont films (1990–1999) =

The following is a list of films produced, co-produced, and/or distributed by French film company Gaumont in the 1990s. The films are listed under their French release dates.

== 1990 ==
Release date	Title	Notes
14 February 1990	The Palermo Connection	
21 February 1990	Nikita	co-production with Les Films Du Loup, Cecchi Gori Group Tiger and Cinematografica
25 April 1990	What Time Is It?	
29 August 1990	My Father's Glory	
26 October 1990	My Mother's Castle	

== 1991 ==
Release date	Title	Notes
6 February 1991	L'Opération Corned-Beef	
17 April 1991	Triplex	
8 May 1991	Captain Fracassa's Journey	
22 May 1991	Cold Moon	
21 August 1991	Atlantis	co-production with Les Films Du Loup, Cecchi Gori Group Tiger and Cinematografica
28 August 1991	Oscar	English-language film; Original owner of the 1967 film; co-production with Touchstone Pictures and Silver Screen Partners IV
16 October 1991	Les Amants du Pont-Neuf	
30 October 1991	Van Gogh	
1991	Pure Luck	English-language film; Original owner of the 1981 film; co-production with Universal Pictures

== 1992 ==
Release date	Title	Notes
12 February 1992	Le Bal des casse-pieds	
19 February 1992	Les Enfants du naufrageur	
1 April 1992	Céline	
22 April 1992	La Gamine	
26 August 1992	The Plague	
12 October 1992	1492: Conquest of Paradise	English-language film; co-production with Légende Entreprises
30 December 1992	L'Atlantide	

== 1993 ==
Release date	Title	Notes
27 January 1993	The Visitors	
7 April 1993	Cuisine et Dépendances	
26 May 1993	Toxic Affair	
16 June 1993	Fanfan	co-production with Alter Films and Canal+
14 July 1993	Point of No Return	English-langauge film; Original owner of the 1990 film; co-production with Warner Bros. and Art Linson Productions
18 August 1993	1, 2, 3, Sun	
31 August 1993	La Soif de l'or	
15 September 1993	Justinien Trouvé ou le Bâtard de Dieu	
24 November 1993	Son of the Shark	
15 December 1993	Robin Hood: Men in Tights	English-language film; co-production with Brooksfilms

== 1994 ==
Release date	Title	Notes
12 January 1994	Montparnasse-Pondichéry	
9 February 1994	Cache cash	
18 May 1994	Dead Tired	co-production with TF1 Films Production
1 June 1994	The Patriots	
6 July 1994	Pourquoi maman est dans mon lit ?	
14 September 1994	Léon: The Professional	English-language film; co-production with Les Films du Dauphin.

== 1995 ==
Release date	Title	Notes
1 February 1995	Élisa	
28 February 1995	The Good Old Daze	
19 April 1995	Les Truffes	
11 October 1995	Guardian Angels	co-production with TF1 Films Production, Funny Films and Vaudeville Productions

== 1996 ==
Release date	Title	Notes
7 February 1996	Let's Hope it Lasts	
20 March 1996	Fantôme avec chauffeur	
10 April 1996	Dracula: Dead and Loving It	English-language film; co-production with Castle Rock Entertainment and Brooksfilms
11 September 1996	Les Victimes	
9 October 1996	Le Jaguar	
4 December 1996	Oui	

== 1997 ==
Release date	Title	Notes
15 January 1997	The Mirror Has Two Faces	English-language film; Original owner of the 1958 film; co-production with TriStar Pictures
5 February 1997	Amour et confusions	
2 April 1997	Les Soeurs Soleil	co-production with France 2 Cinéma, France 3 Cinéma and Ouille Productions
7 May 1997	The Fifth Element	English-language film; International distribution by Columbia Pictures
18 June 1997	Le Déménagement	
27 August 1997	Héroïnes	
10 December 1997	XXL	co-production with Légende Entreprises

== 1998 ==
Release date	Title	Notes
15 April 1998	The Dinner Game	co-production with EFVE and TF1 Films Production
28 October 1998	Hanuman	
18 December 1998	The Visitors II: The Corridors of Time	
23 December 1998	Bimboland	co-production with Légende Entreprises and TF1 Films Production

== 1999 ==
Release date	Title	Notes
7 April 1999	L'Âme-sœur	
21 April 1999	Mille Bornes	co-production with Magouric Productions and M6 Films
25 August 1999	Le schpountz	
27 October 1999	The Messenger: The Story of Joan of Arc	English-language film;
