= List of Bleecker Street films =

Bleecker Street is an American film distribution and production company.

== 2010s ==
Release date	Film	Notes
March 20, 2015	Danny Collins	U.S. distribution only; produced by Big Indie Pictures and ShivHans Pictures
May 15, 2015	I'll See You In My Dreams	distribution only; produced by Part2 Pictures, Northern Lights Films, Two Films and Jeff Rice Films; international rights licensed to Universal Pictures
September 16, 2015	Pawn Sacrifice	U.S. distribution only; produced by Gail Katz Productions, PalmStar Media, MICA Entertainment and Material Pictures; distributed internationally by Lionsgate
October 16, 2015	Beasts of No Nation	co-distribution with Netflix only; produced by Participant Media, Red Crown Productions, Primary Productions, New Balloon and Parliament of Owls
November 6, 2015	Trumbo	U.S. distribution only; produced by ShivHans Pictures, Everyman Pictures and Groundswell Productions; distributed internationally by Entertainment One
March 11, 2016	Eye in the Sky	U.S. distribution only; produced by Entertainment One and Raindog Films
April 22, 2016	Elvis & Nixon	U.S. theatrical co-distribution with Amazon Studios only; produced by Benaroya Pictures, Autumn Productions, Inc., Elevated Films, Johnny Mac & David Hansen Productions and Holly Wiersma Productions
July 8, 2016	Captain Fantastic	U.S. distribution only; produced by Electric City Entertainment and ShivHans Pictures; distributed internationally by Entertainment One
August 12, 2016	Anthropoid	U.S. distribution only; produced by LD Entertainment, 22h22, Lucky Man Films and Silver A
September 30, 2016	Denial	North American distribution only; produced by BBC Films, Participant Media, Shoebox Films and Krasnoff/Foster Entertainment
December 28, 2016	Paterson	U.S. co-distribution with Amazon Studios only; produced by K5 International, Animal Kingdom, Le Pacte and Inkjet Productions
March 3, 2017	The Last Word	distribution in the U.S., Latin America, Eastern Europe, Scandinavia and the Benelux only; produced by Myriad Pictures, Wondros and Aaron Magnani Productions
April 14, 2017	The Lost City of Z	U.S. theatrical co-distribution with Amazon Studios only; produced by Keep Your Head Productions, MadRiver Pictures, MICA Entertainment and Plan B Entertainment
June 9, 2017	Megan Leavey	U.S. distribution only; produced by LD Entertainment
August 18, 2017	Logan Lucky	U.S. co-distribution with Fingerprint Releasing only
October 13, 2017	Breathe	North American co-distribution with Participant Media only; produced by BBC Films, BFI, Silver Reel Entertainment, Embankment Films and The Imaginarium Studios
November 22, 2017	The Man Who Invented Christmas	distribution in the U.S., Latin America, Eastern Europe, Scandinavia and the Benelux only; produced by Parallel Films and Rhombus Media
February 16, 2018	Nostalgia	North American distribution only
March 23, 2018	Unsane	U.S. co-distribution with Fingerprint Releasing only; produced by Regency Enterprises; distributed internationally by 20th Century Fox
April 11, 2018	Beirut	U.S. distribution only; produced by Radar Pictures and ShivHans Pictures
April 27, 2018	Disobedience	U.S. distribution only; produced by FilmNation Entertainment, Element Pictures, LC6 Productions, Braven Films and Film4 Productions
May 18, 2018	On Chesil Beach	U.S. distribution only; co-production with BBC Films, Number 9 Films, Rocket Science, Golan Films and Lipsync Productions
June 29, 2018	Leave No Trace	North American distribution only; produced by Bron Studios, Topic Studios, Harrison Productions, Still Rolling Productions and Reisman Productions; distributed internationally by Sony Pictures Releasing International and Stage 6 Films
July 20, 2018	McQueen	North American distribution only; produced by Salon Pictures and Misfits Entertainment
August 24, 2018	Papillon	U.S. distribution only; produced by Red Granite Pictures, Ram Bergman Productions, Czech Anglo Productions and FishCorb Films
September 21, 2018	Colette	U.S. co-distribution with 30West only; produced by Number 9 Films, Killer Films and Bold Films
October 12, 2018	What They Had	North American distribution only; produced by Unified Pictures, Bona Fide Productions, June Pictures and Look to the Sky Films
February 1, 2019	Arctic	U.S. and select international distribution only; produced by Armory Films, Union Entertainment Group and Pegasus Pictures
March 22, 2019	Hotel Mumbai	U.S. co-distribution with ShivHans Pictures only; produced by Xeitgeist Entertainment Group, Archlight Films, Thunder Road Pictures, Electric Pictures and Screen Australia
April 12, 2019	Teen Spirit	U.S. co-distribution with LD Entertainment only; produced by Automatik Entertainment, Blank Tape and Interscope Films
May 22, 2019	The Tomorrow Man	U.S. distribution only; produced by Anonymous Content and Symbolic Exchange; distributed internationally by Sony Pictures Releasing International and Stage 6 Films
July 12, 2019	The Art of Self-Defense	distribution only; produced by End Cue; international rights licensed to Universal Pictures
August 9, 2019	Brian Banks	U.S. distribution only; produced by Gidden Media and ShivHans Pictures; distributed internationally by Sony Pictures Releasing International and Stage 6 Films

== 2020s ==
Release date	Film	Notes
January 31, 2020	The Assistant	North American distribution only; produced by Cinereach, Forensic Films, Bellmer Pictures, Symbolic Exchange, 3311 Productions, Level Forward and JJ Homeward Productions
February 14, 2020	Ordinary Love	U.S. distribution only; produced by BFI, Northern Ireland Screen, Out of Orbit, Canderblinks Film, Head Gear Films, Bankside Films and Temp Productions
March 13, 2020	The Roads Not Taken	U.S. distribution only; produced by BBC Films, BFI, Ingenious Media, HanWay Films, Film i Väst, Chimney Pot, Sverige AB and Adventure Pictures
May 22, 2020	Military Wives	U.S. distribution only; produced by Ingenious Media, Tempo Productions, Embankement Films and 42
September 16, 2020	The Secrets We Keep	U.S. distribution only; produced by AGC Studios, Image Nation Abu Dhabi, Di Bonaventura Pictures, Echo Lake Entertainment and Fibonacci Films
October 2, 2020	Save Yourselves!	distribution only; produced by Keshet Studios, Last Rodeo Studios and Washington Square Films; international rights licensed to Sony Pictures Worldwide Acquisitions
December 11, 2020	Wild Mountain Thyme	U.S. distribution only; produced by Likely Story, Fís Éireann/Screen Ireland, Mar-Key Pictures, HanWay Films, Port Pictures and Amasia Entertainment
January 29, 2021	Supernova	North American distribution only; produced by BBC Films, BFI, The Bureau and Quiddity Films
February 12, 2021	The World to Come	North American distribution only; produced by Killer Films, Ingenious Media, Sea Change Media, Hype Films, M.Y.R.A. Entertainment and Yellow Bear Films; distributed internationally by Sony Pictures Worldwide Acquisitions
April 23, 2021	Together Together	North American distribution only; produced by Kindred Spirit, Stay Gold Features, Wild Idea and Haven Entertainment; distributed internationally by Sony Pictures Worldwide Acquisitions
May 21, 2021	Dream Horse	U.S. distribution only; produced by Ingenious Media, Film4 Productions, Topic Studios, Raw, Cornerstone Films and FFilm Cymru Wales
July 9, 2021	The Loneliest Whale: The Search for 52	North American distribution only; produced by Appian Way Productions, Giagantic Pictures, Reckless Productions and Shorkat Productions
August 27, 2021	Together	North American distribution only; produced by BBC Film, Sonia Friedman Productions and Shoebox Films
September 24, 2021	I’m Your Man	North American distribution only; produced by SWR and Letterbox Filmproduktion
October 8, 2021	Mass	U.S. distribution only; produced by 7 Eccles Street, Circa 1888 and 58 Productions
November 19, 2021	India Sweets and Spices	U.S. distribution only
January 28, 2022	Sundown	North American distribution only; produced by Teorema, Film I Väst, Luxbox and CommonGround Pictures
March 25, 2022	Infinite Storm	U.S. distribution only; produced by Maven Screen Media and Polish Film Institute; distributed internationally by Stage 6 Films
May 13, 2022	Montana Story	U.S. distribution only; produced by Big Creek; distributed internationally by Stage 6 Films
July 1, 2022	Mr. Malcolm's List	U.S. distribution only; produced by Ingenious Media, Refinery29, Fís Éireann/Screen Ireland, Untitled Entertainment, Blinder Films, Rebelle Media and Holly Films Production
July 29, 2022	A Love Song	co-distribution with Stage 6 Films only; produced by Cow Hip Films, Dead End Pictures, Present Company, The Sakana Foundation and Fierce Optimism Films
August 12, 2022	Summering	North American distribution only; produced by 3311 Productions, A Bigger Boat, 1978 Films and City Boy Hands; distributed internationally by Stage 6 Films
August 26, 2022	Breaking	U.S. distribution only; produced by EPIC Magazine, Salmira Productions, Little Lamb and UpperRoom Productions; distributed internationally by Universal Pictures
December 12, 2022	2nd Chance	U.S. co-distribution with Showtime only
February 17, 2023	Emily	U.S. distribution only; produced by Embankment Films, Tempo Productions, Ingenious Media and Arenamedia; distributed in the U.K. by Warner Bros. Pictures on October 14, 2022
April 14, 2023	Mafia Mamma	North American distribution only
May 12, 2023	The Starling Girl	North American distribution only; produced by Pinky Promise and 2AM; distributed internationally by Focus Features and Universal Pictures
July 7, 2023	The Lesson	U.S. distribution only; distributed internationally by Focus Features and Universal Pictures
August 11, 2023	Jules	North American distribution only
August 25, 2023	Golda	U.S. co-distribution with ShivHans Pictures only
November 3, 2023	What Happens Later	U.S. distribution only
December 7, 2023	Waitress: The Musical	U.S. co-distribution with Fathom Events only
January 19, 2024	I.S.S.	U.S. distribution only; distributed internationally by Focus Features and Universal Pictures
February 9, 2024	Out of Darkness	North American distribution only
March 15, 2024	One Life	U.S. distribution only
March 22, 2024	Kumiko, the Treasure Hunter	10th anniversary limited release; originally distributed by Amplify
April 12, 2024	Sasquatch Sunset	U.S. distribution only
May 31, 2024	Ezra	U.S. distribution only
June 14, 2024	Treasure	co-distribution with FilmNation Entertainment only
July 26, 2024	The Fabulous Four	North American distribution only
August 30, 2024	Slingshot	U.S. distribution only
October 18, 2024	Rumours	U.S. distribution only
December 6, 2024	The Return	North American distribution only
January 10, 2025	Hard Truths	North American distribution only
January 31, 2025	Love Me	U.S. distribution only; distributed internationally by Focus Features and Universal Pictures
March 28, 2025	The Friend	North American distribution only; distributed internationally by Focus Features and Universal Pictures
April 18, 2025	The Wedding Banquet	North American distribution only; distributed internationally by Universal Pictures
July 5, 2025	This Is Spinal Tap	limited three day re-release engagement; co-distribution with Fathom Entertainment; originally distributed by Embassy Pictures
August 22, 2025	Relay	U.S. distribution only
September 12, 2025	Spinal Tap II: The End Continues	U.S. distribution only
October 3, 2025	Bone Lake	U.S. co-distribution with LD Entertainment
November 14, 2025	Rebuilding	U.S. distribution only
December 5, 2025	Fackham Hall	U.S. co-distribution with Legion M only
February 4, 2026	Stray Kids: The dominATE Experience	North American distribution under the Crosswalk label only
March 13, 2026	Slanted	U.S. co-distribution with Fox Entertainment Studios only
June 12, 2026	Stop! That! Train!	North American distribution only
July 24, 2026	Hadestown: The Musical	co-distribution in North America, the U.K., Ireland, Australia, New Zealand and South Africa with LD Entertainment only; distributed under the Crosswalk label; international rights licensed to Universal Pictures
October 9, 2026	Musk	U.S. theatrical distribution only
October 23, 2026	A Talent for Murder	U.S. co-distribution with LD Entertainment only
November 13, 2026	Victorian Psycho	U.S. distribution only

== Upcoming ==
Release date	Film	Notes
December 11, 2026	Tender Loving Care	North American distribution only
December 11, 2026	George Michael: The Faith Tour	North American distribution under the Crosswalk label only
January 8, 2027	The Liberation	U.S. distribution only
January 22, 2027	The Third Parent	North American distribution only
February 5, 2027	Twice: This Is For... You	North American distribution under the Crosswalk label only

=== Undated films ===
Release date	Film	Notes
2027	Buzzkill	U.S. distribution only
2027	Long Live Def Leppard	North American distribution under the Crosswalk label only
2027	NDA	U.S. distribution only
2027	When Darkness Loves Us	distribution outside Australia and New Zealand only
TBA	Spinal Tap at Stonehenge: The Final Finale	U.S. distribution under the Crosswalk label only
