= List of Star (Disney+) original films =

These are original films produced by Star, an over-the-top content brand owned by Disney Streaming.

== Original films ==
=== Feature films ===
| Title | Genre | Release date | Runtime | Exclusive region(s) | Language |
|---|---|---|---|---|---|
| Recep İvedik 7 | Comedy | December 9, 2022 (Note: Turkey, Austria, Germany, Switzerland); December 23, 2022 (Note: Rest of Europe); February 10, 2023 (Note: All other territories) | 2 h 13 min | All markets | Turkish |
| New Year's Eve | Comedy | December 30, 2022; March 3, 2023 | 2 h 21 min | All markets | Turkish |
| The Nightingale of Bursa | Comedy | January 13, 2023; March 10, 2023 | 2 h | All markets | Turkish |
| My Apologies | Comedy | April 14, 2023 | 1 h 50 min | All markets | Turkish |
| A Place to Fight For | Romantic thriller | July 7, 2023 | 1 h 34 min | All markets | French |
| Antigang: La Relève | Action thriller | August 25, 2023 | 1 h 30 min | Selected territories | French |

=== Documentaries ===
| Title | Subject | Release date | Runtime | Exclusive region(s) | Language |
|---|---|---|---|---|---|
| Finding Michael | Search and rescue biopic | March 15, 2023 | 1 h 40 min | All markets | English |
| Hideo Kojima: Connecting Worlds | Video games biopic | February 23, 2024 | 59 min | Selected territories | English |

=== Specials ===
| Title | Genre | Release date | Runtime | Exclusive region(s) | Language |
|---|---|---|---|---|---|
| The Pope: Answers | Interview/dialogue | April 5, 2023 | 1 h 22 min | All markets | Spanish |
| PSY Summer Swag 2022 | Concert film | May 3, 2023 | 1 h 26 min | All markets | Korean |

=== Shorts ===
| Title | Genre | Release date | Runtime | Language | Exclusive region(s) |
|---|---|---|---|---|---|
| UNLOCK MORE ENTERTAINMENT: with 16+ & 18+ content settings (Note: A promotional short film describing how to update age rating and content settings on Disney+) | Instructional | July 19, 2021 | 42 sec. | English | United Kingdom and Ireland |
