= List of Gaumont films (2000–2009) =

The following is a list of films produced, co-produced, and/or distributed by French film company Gaumont in the 2000s. The films are listed under their French release dates.

== 2000 ==
Release date	Title	Notes
19 January 2000	Épouse-moi	
10 May 2000	Vatel	English-language film; co-production with Légende Entreprises
28 June 2000	La Vache et le Président	
27 September 2000	The Crimson Rivers	co-production with Légende Entreprises
6 October 2000	Me Myself I	English-language film;

== 2001 ==
Release date	Title	Notes
11 April 2001	Just Visiting	English-language film; co-production with Hughes Entertainment
7 November 2001	J'ai faim !!!	

== 2002 ==
Release date	Title	Notes
27 March 2002	The Race	
4 September 2002	I'm with Lucy	English-language film; co-production with Fabulous Films and Process Productions
23 October 2002	The Code	

== 2003 ==
Release date	Title	Notes
16 April 2003	Fureur	
4 June 2003	Mais qui a tué Pamela Rose ?	
20 August 2003	Father and Sons	
24 September 2003	Lovely Rita, sainte patronne des cas désespérés	
10 December 2003	Ripoux 3	

== 2004 ==
Release date	Title	Notes
14 January 2004	Albert est méchant	
23 June 2004	Qui perd gagne !	
6 October 2004	The Corsican File	
24 November 2004	36 Quai des Orfèvres	

== 2005 ==
Release date	Title	Notes
20 April 2005	Empire of the Wolves	
7 September 2005	Virgil	
19 October 2005	Once Upon a Time in the Oued	
23 November 2005	Palais Royal!	

== 2006 ==
Release date	Title	Notes
11 January 2006	You Are So Beautiful	
18 January 2006	A Ticket to Space	
8 February 2006	La Piste	
29 March 2006	The Valet	
19 April 2006	OSS 117: Cairo, Nest of Spies	
16 August 2006	The Science of Sleep	
26 November 2006	Blame It on Fidel	
27 December 2006	The Year of the Hare	

== 2007 ==
Release date	Title	Notes
24 January 2007	Have Mercy on Us All	
13 June 2007	Ill Wind	
10 October 2007	Earth	distribution only; produced by BBC Worldwide, Greenlight Media and Discovery Channel
31 October 2007	Chrysalis	
21 November 2007	Two Worlds	
12 December 2007	Big City	

== 2008 ==
Release date	Title	Notes
16 January 2008	The Merry Widow	
12 March 2008	The Last Deadly Mission	
30 April 2008	15 ans et demi	
4 June 2008	JCVD	
1 October 2008	A French Gigolo	
26 November 2008	The Broken	

== 2009 ==
Release date	Title	Notes
9 January 2009	Beauties at War	
15 April 2009	OSS 117: Lost in Rio	
16 December 2009	The Last Flight	
