= List of Twentieth Century Pictures films =

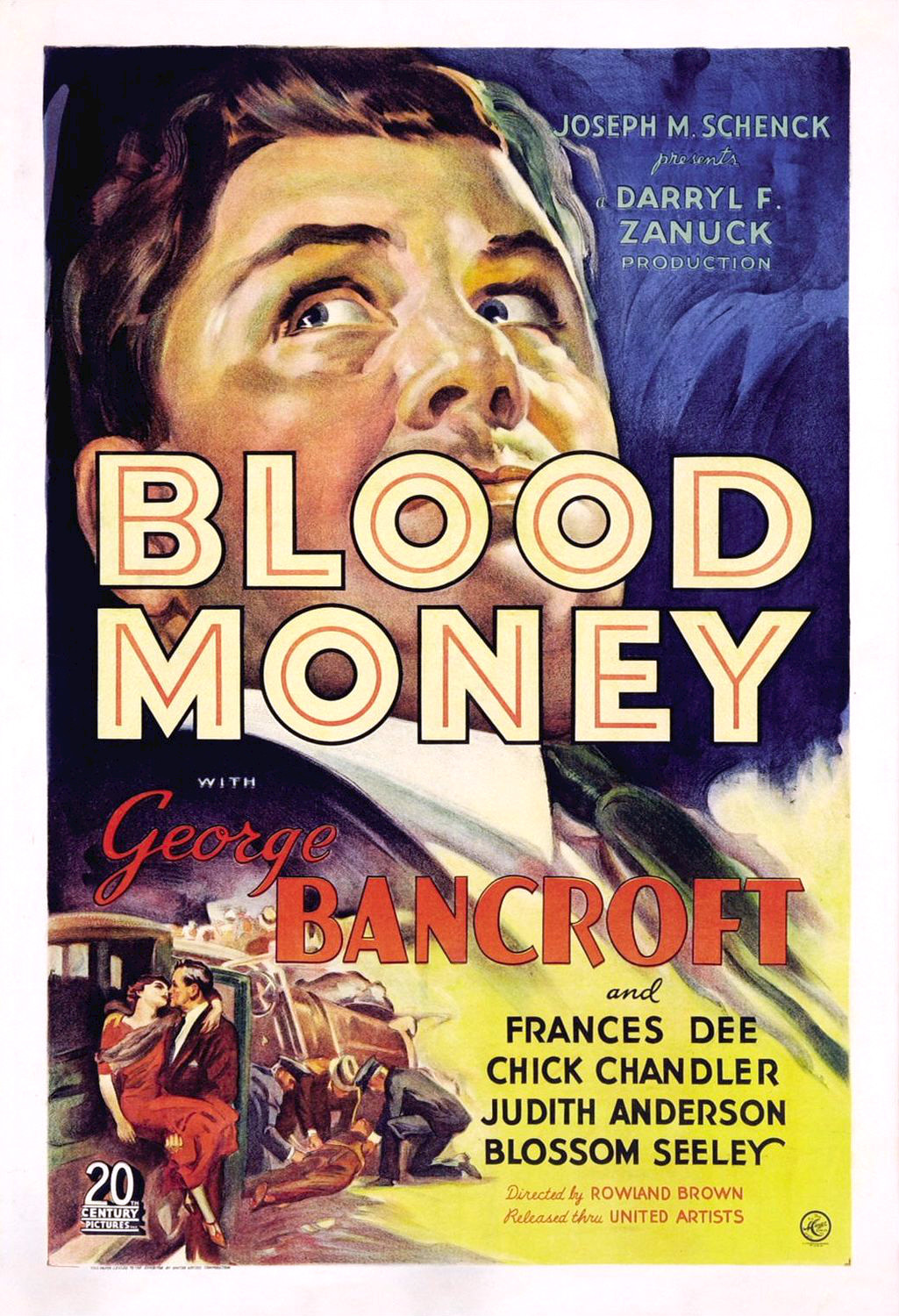
Poster for Blood Money (1933)

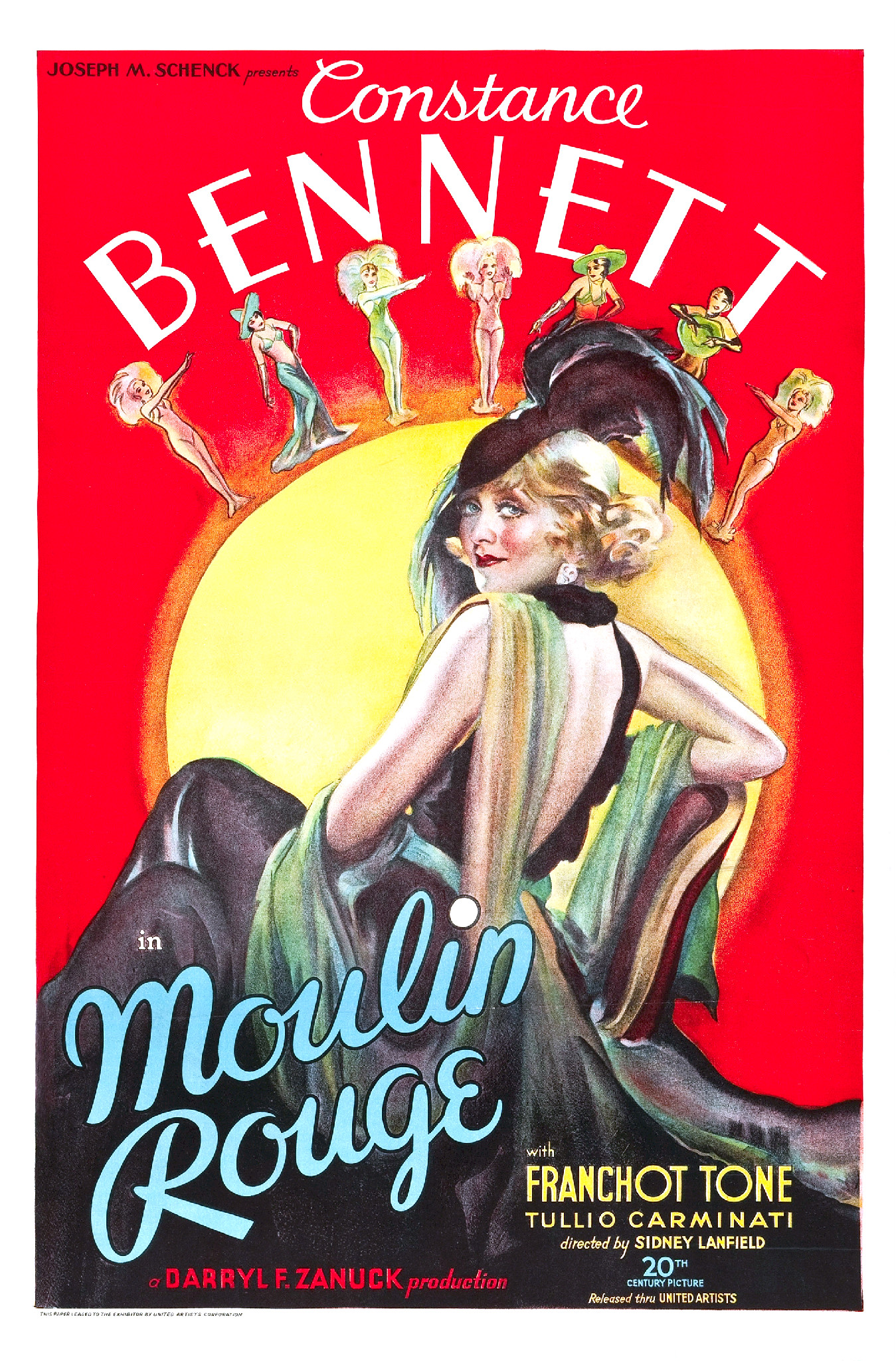
Poster for Moulin Rouge (1934)

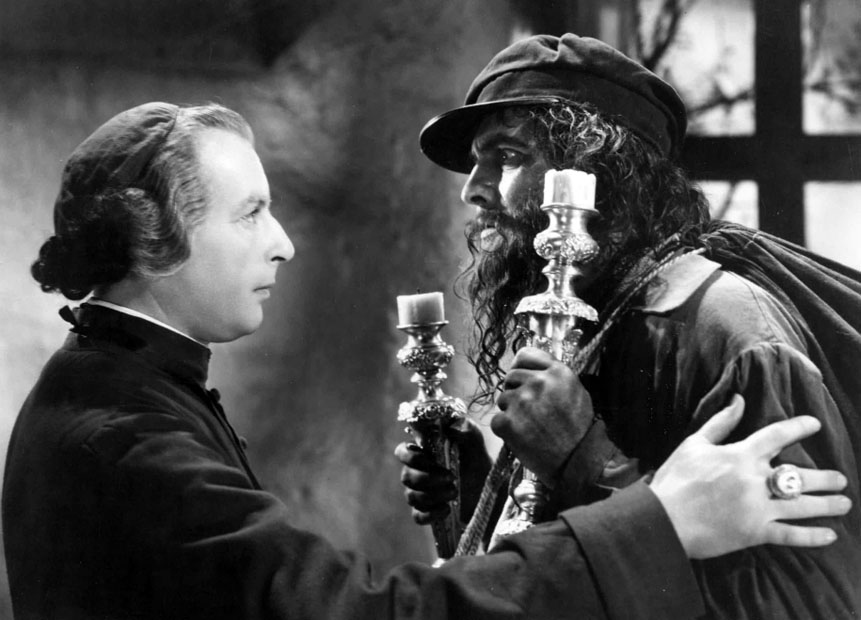
Cedric Hardwicke and Fredric March in Les Misérables (1935)

This is a list of films produced by Twentieth Century Pictures, distributed by United Artists and 20th Century-Fox Film Corporation.

Release date	Film title	Notes
October 7, 1933	The Bowery	This is the first movie made by Twentieth Century Pictures.
November 2, 1933	Broadway Through a Keyhole	
November 17, 1933	Blood Money	The film was considered to be lost for over forty years until it resurfaced on TCM.
December 1, 1933	Advice to the Lovelorn	
January 5, 1934	Gallant Lady	
January 19, 1934	Moulin Rouge	This is the last Twentieth Century Pictures film to have the original title sequence layout
March 29, 1934	Looking for Trouble	
April 7, 1934	The House of Rothschild	This is one of only a few films other than Disney's Silly Symphonies to have three-strip Technicolor.
April 28, 1934	The Last Gentleman	
May 18, 1934	Born to Be Bad	This is the only film out of Twentieth Century's first 18 movies to be a box office bomb and it is one of two films that weren't co-reissued by Fox and NTA, the other one being Call of the Wild.
August 15, 1934	Bulldog Drummond Strikes Back	This is the first film to be copyrighted in 1934.
August 24, 1934	The Affairs of Cellini	
December 23, 1934	The Mighty Barnum	
January 25, 1935	Clive of India	This is the last film to have Darryl F. Zanuck's full name on the title sequence.
February 22, 1935	Folies Bergère de Paris	This is the only Twentieth Century Pictures film to be filmed in sepia.
April 20, 1935	Les Misérables	This is one of the few films that were reissued by 20th Century-Fox in the 1940s-1950s
April 28, 1935	Cardinal Richelieu	
May 10, 1935	L'homme des Folies Bergère	This is just the French dub of Folies-Bergère de Paris
August 9, 1935	Call of the Wild	This is the final film under the Twentieth Century Pictures banner and to be distributed by United Artists.
November 8, 1935	Metropolitan	This is the first of five unfinished Twentieth Century Pictures films released under 20th Century-Fox's banner.
November 14, 1935	The Man Who Broke the Bank at Monte Carlo	
November 15, 1935	Thanks a Million	
December 6, 1935	Show Them No Mercy!	
April 10, 1936	A Message to Garcia	This is the last Twentieth Century Pictures film.

== Merger ==
20th Century Pictures merged with the bankrupt Fox Film Corporation on May 31, 1935, after talks began about merging the two companies the same day, to form the blockbuster 20th Century-Fox Film Corporation (the hyphen was dropped in 1985 and it was shortened to just 20th Century Studios in 2020) which already had its first film right after the merger which was Under the Pampas Moon, released a day later.
