= List of Peacock original films =

List of Peacock original films contains a list of television films created and distributed by the streaming service Peacock.

== Original films ==
=== Feature films ===
| Title | Genre | Release | Runtime |
|---|---|---|---|
| Psych 2: Lassie Come Home | Detective comedy drama | July 15, 2020 | 1 h 28 min |
| Curious George: Go West, Go Wild | Family animation | September 8, 2020 | 1 h 25 min |
| Curious George: Cape Ahoy | Family animation | September 30, 2021 | 1 h 28 min |
| Psych 3: This Is Gus | Detective comedy drama | November 18, 2021 | 1 h 36 min |
| The Housewives of the North Pole | Comedy | December 9, 2021 | 1 h 24 min |
| Days of Our Lives: A Very Salem Christmas (Note: Unavailable) | Soap opera | December 16, 2021 | 1 h 18 min |
| They/Them | Slasher | August 5, 2022 | 1 h 30 min |
| Meet Cute | Science fiction romantic comedy | September 21, 2022 | 1 h 29 min |
| Sick | Slasher | January 13, 2023 | 1 h 23 min |
| Praise This | Musical comedy | April 7, 2023 | 1 h 50 min |
| Shooting Stars | Biopic | June 2, 2023 | 1 h 55 min |
| If You Were the Last | Science fiction romantic comedy | October 20, 2023 | 1 h 33 min |
| Please Don't Destroy: The Treasure of Foggy Mountain | Comedy | November 17, 2023 | 1 h 32 min |
| Genie | Holiday fantasy comedy | November 22, 2023 | 1 h 33 min |
| Mr. Monk's Last Case: A Monk Movie | Crime comedy | December 8, 2023 | 1 h 37 min |
| Bosco | Biopic | February 2, 2024 | 1 h 44 min |
| Megamind vs. the Doom Syndicate | Family animation | March 1, 2024 | 1 h 23 min |
| The Killer | Action thriller | August 23, 2024 | 2 h 6 min |
| Bridget Jones: Mad About the Boy | Romantic comedy | February 13, 2025 | 2 h 5 min |
| Strung | Psychological thriller | June 26, 2026 | 1 h 59 min |

=== Documentaries ===
| Title | Subject | Release | Runtime |
|---|---|---|---|
| Dreams Live On: Countdown to Tokyo | Sports | July 15, 2020 | 57 min |
| In Deep with Ryan Lochte | Sports | July 15, 2020 | 1 h 3 min |
| Kamome | Natural disaster/Culture | July 15, 2020 | 23 min |
| Black Boys | Racial justice | September 10, 2020 | 1 h 30 min |
| The Sit-In: Harry Belafonte Hosts The Tonight Show | Entertainment | September 10, 2020 | 1 h 17 min |
| Madness in the Hills | Natural disaster | October 9, 2020 | 21 min |
| Freedia Got a Gun | Music | October 15, 2020 | 1 h 25 min |
| My Pursuit: Life, Legacy & Jordan Burroughs | Sports | April 1, 2021 | 34 min |
| The Greatest Race | Sports | June 10, 2021 | 1 h 9 min |
| Civil War (Or, Who Do We Think We Are) | History/Education | June 17, 2021 | 1 h 40 min |
| Sisters of '96: The 1996 Women's Olympic Soccer Team | Sports | July 14, 2021 | 58 min |
| Chase | Sports | August 25, 2021 | 52 min |
| The Toolbox Killer | True crime | September 23, 2021 | 1 h 27 min |
| Right to Try | HIV/AIDS | December 1, 2021 | 26 min |
| The Murder of Gabby Petito: Truth, Lies and Social Media | True crime | December 17, 2021 | 1 h 25 min |
| Use of Force: The Policing of Black America | Police brutality | January 14, 2022 | 1 h 25 min |
| Picabo | Sports | January 21, 2022 | 1 h 30 min |
| Hell of a Cruise | Epidemiology | September 14, 2022 | 1 h 18 min |
| Sex, Lies and the College Cult | True crime | September 28, 2022 | 1 h 29 min |
| Prince Andrew: Banished | Celebrity/Scandal | October 5, 2022 | 1 h 19 min |
| The Rebellious Life of Mrs. Rosa Parks | Biography | October 19, 2022 | 1 h 36 min |
| A Friend of the Family: True Evil | True crime | November 15, 2022 | 1 h 30 min |
| Woooooo! Becoming Ric Flair | Biography | December 26, 2022 | 1 h 51 min |
| Amber: The Girl Behind the Alert | True crime | January 17, 2023 | 1 h 32 min |
| Lowndes County and the Road to Black Power | Voters' rights | February 2, 2023 | 1 h 29 min |
| Cocaine Bear: The True Story | True crime | April 15, 2023 | 52 min |
| American Nightmare: Becoming Cody Rhodes | Biography | July 31, 2023 | 1 h 51 min |
| Commitment to Life | HIV/AIDS | December 1, 2023 | 1 h 56 min |
| We Dare to Dream | Sports | December 1, 2023 | 1 h 37 min |
| Dr. Death: Cutthroat Conman | True crime | December 21, 2023 | 1 h 25 min |
| Pathological: The Lies of Joran van der Sloot | True crime | February 27, 2024 | 1 h 34 min |
| Stormy | Celebrity/Scandal | March 18, 2024 | 1 h 50 min |
| Bray Wyatt: Becoming Immortal | Professional wrestling | April 1, 2024 | 2 h 2 min |
| Queer Planet | Nature | June 6, 2024 | 1 h 30 min |
| TikTok Star Murders | True crime | June 25, 2024 | 1 h 9 min |
| Gary | Biography | August 29, 2024 | 1 h 31 min |
| Diddy: The Making of a Bad Boy | Biography/True crime | January 14, 2025 | 1 h 30 min |
| Matthew Perry: A Hollywood Tragedy | Biography/True crime | February 25, 2025 | 1 h |
| WrestleMania IX: Becoming a Spectacle | Professional wrestling | April 11, 2025 | 1 h 49 min |
| The Idaho Student Murders | True crime | July 3, 2025 | 1 h 27 min |
| Downey Wrote That | Television industry | October 17, 2025 | 1 h 6 min |
| The Heartbreak Kid: Becoming Shawn Michaels | Professional wrestling | April 13, 2026 | 1 h 37 min |
| Kill. Bury. Print. | Journalism/True crime | September 27, 2026 | 1 h 26 min |

=== Specials ===
| Title | Genre | Release | Runtime |
|---|---|---|---|
| Snoop and Martha's Very Tasty Halloween | Reality competition | October 21, 2020 | 52 min |
| Sketchy Times with Lilly Singh | Sketch comedy | October 29, 2020 | 42 min |
| Carmen Christopher: Street Special | Stand-up comedy | May 20, 2021 | 32 min |
| Miley Cyrus Presents Stand by You | Concert film | June 25, 2021 | 1 h 9 min |
| Good Timing with Jo Firestone | Comedy | October 15, 2021 | 49 min |
| Joyelle Nicole Johnson: Love Joy | Stand-up comedy | November 5, 2021 | 53 min |
| 2021 and Done with Snoop Dogg & Kevin Hart | Comedy | December 28, 2021 | 1 h 12 min |
| Would It Kill You to Laugh? Starring Kate Berlant + John Early | Sketch comedy | June 24, 2022 | 53 min |
| Alyssa Limperis: No Bad Days | Stand-up comedy | August 12, 2022 | 56 min |
| Jena Friedman: Ladykiller | Stand-up comedy | September 30, 2022 | 58 min |
| Sean Patton: Number One | Stand-up comedy | December 2, 2022 | 1 h 27 min |
| 2022: Back That Year Up with Kevin Hart & Kenan Thompson | Comedy | December 23, 2022 | 1 h 12 min |
| Josh Johnson: Up Here Killing Myself | Stand-up comedy | February 17, 2023 | 1 hour |
| Kevin Hart: Reality Check | Stand-up comedy | July 6, 2023 | 58 min |
| Chris Fleming: Hell | Stand-up comedy | August 18, 2023 | 1 h 9 min |
| Lego Jurassic Park: The Unofficial Retelling | Animation | October 10, 2023 | 22 min |
| 2023: Back That Year Up with Kevin Hart & Kenan Thompson | Comedy | December 26, 2023 | 1 h 10 min |
| Good One: A Show About Jokes | Stand-up comedy | March 26, 2024 | 47 min |

=== Shorts ===
These are programs that have a runtime of less than 20 minutes.

| Title | Genre | Release | Runtime |
|---|---|---|---|
| To: Gerard | Animation | December 17, 2020 | 7 min |

=== Exclusive international distribution ===
| Title | Genre | Release | Runtime |
|---|---|---|---|
| Anthony | Drama | September 4, 2020 | 1 h 24 min |

== Upcoming original films ==
=== Feature films ===
| Title | Genre | Release | Runtime | Language |
|---|---|---|---|---|
| Community: The Movie | Comedy | TBA | TBA | English |
