= List of Gaumont films (2010–2019) =

The following is a list of films produced, co-produced, and/or distributed by French film company Gaumont in the 2010s. The films are listed under their French release dates.

== 2010 ==
Release date	Title	Notes
10 March 2010	The Round Up	
23 June 2010	The Chameleon	
30 June 2010	Splice	English-language film; co-production with Copperheart Entertainment
8 September 2010	Twelve	English-language film;
27 October 2010	Bacon on the Side	distribution only; produced by Les Films du Cap and 4 Mecs À Lunettes
10 November 2010	Dinner for Schmucks	English-language film; distributed by Paramount Pictures; Original owner of the 1998 film; co-production with DreamWorks Pictures, Spyglass Entertainment, Parkes/MacDonald Productions, Everyman Pictures and Reliance Entertainment
24 November 2010	Santa's Apprentice	co-production with Gaumont-Alphanim and Avrill Stark Entertainment
1 December 2010	Point Blank	co-production with LGM Cinéma

== 2011 ==
Release date	Title	Notes
16 February 2011	Last Night	
9 March 2011	The Straight Line	
13 July 2011	Late Bloomers	
28 September 2011	A Happy Event	
2 November 2011	The Intouchables	
30 November 2011	A Gang Story	

== 2012 ==
Release date	Title	Notes
7 March 2012	The Chef	
11 July 2012	Porn in the Hood	
12 September 2012	Camille Rewinds	
5 December 2012	F.B.I. Frog Butthead Investigators	

== 2013 ==
Release date	Title	Notes
16 January 2013	Paulette	
20 February 2013	Vive la France	
3 April 2013	Perfect Mothers	
22 May 2013	Only God Forgives	English-language film; distributed by Wild Side Films
16 October 2013	The Young and Prodigious T. S. Spivet	
6 November 2013	Turning Tide	
20 November 2013	The Magic Snowflake	
18 December 2013	Belle and Sebastian	

== 2014 ==
Release date	Title	Notes
15 January 2014	Love Is the Perfect Crime	
5 March 2014	Diplomacy	
2 April 2014	My Summer in Provence	
14 May 2014	Grace of Monaco	
10 September 2014	Gemma Bovery	
15 October 2014	Samba	
12 November 2014	Breathe	
3 December 2014	The Connection	
17 December 2014	The Gate	

== 2015 ==
Release date	Title	Notes
28 January 2015	I Kissed a Girl	
29 April 2015	The Parisian Bitch, Princess of Hearts	
17 June 2015	Through the Air	
22 July 2015	Our Futures	
16 September 2015	Learn by Heart	
4 November 2015	All Three of Us	
18 November 2015	Courted	
9 December 2015	Belle & Sebastian: The Adventure Continues	

== 2016 ==
Release date	Title	Notes
13 January 2016	The Boy and the Beast	French distribution only; co-production with Toho, Nippon Television and Studio Chizu
3 February 2016	Chocolat	
24 February 2016	Pattaya	
6 April 2016	The Visitors: Bastille Day	
8 April 2016	The End	
20 April 2016	Sophie's Misfortunes	
4 May 2016	Up for Love	
8 June 2016	The Neon Demon	distributed by Le Pacte
31 August 2016	Odd Job	
19 October 2016	Brice 3	
11 November 2016	Ares	
14 December 2016	Ballerina	
28 December 2016	Heartstrings	

== 2017 ==
Release date	Title	Notes
18 January 2017	A Bag of Marbles	
1 March 2017	Patients	
29 March 2017	Baby Bumps	
31 May 2017	Marie-Francine	
14 June 2017	Return to Montauk	
5 July 2017	C'est la vie!	
6 September 2017	Barbara	
25 October 2017	See You up There	

== 2018 ==
Release date	Title	Notes
3 January 2018	Burn Out	
7 February 2018	Belle and Sebastien: Friends for Life	
14 March 2018	Rolling to You	
4 April 2018	The Death of Stalin	
6 June 2018	Volontaire	
7 November 2018	A Man in a Hurry	
19 December 2018	The Emperor of Paris	

== 2019 ==
Release date	Title	Notes
6 March 2019	The Mystery of Henri Pick	
6 June 2019	The Upside	English-language film; distribution in France by Metropolitan Filmexport; Original owner of the 2011 film; co-production with STXfilms, Lantern Entertainment and Escape Artists
12 July 2019	Point Blank	English-language film; distributed by Netflix; co-production with WarParty
28 August 2019	School Life	
23 October 2019	The Specials	
13 November 2019	An Officer and a Spy	
