= List of Gaumont films (2020–2029) =

The following is a list of films produced, co-produced, and/or distributed by French film company Gaumont in the 2020s. The films are listed under their French release dates.

== 2020 ==
Release date	Title	Notes
5 February 2020	Iamhere	
21 October 2020	Bye Bye Morons	
30 October 2020	Rogue City	distributed by Netflix

== 2021 ==
Release date	Title	Notes
4 August 2021	OSS 117: From Africa with Love	co-production with Mandarin Production, Scope Pictures and M6 Films
8 September 2021	Hold Me Tight	
20 October 2021	Lost Illusions	
10 November 2021	Aline	
1 December 2021	The Accusation	

== 2022 ==
Release date	Title	Notes
23 February 2022	Heart of Oak	
18 May 2022	The Biggest Fan	
20 May 2022	The Valet	English-language film; distributed by Hulu; Original owner of the 2006 film; co-production with Lionsgate and 3Pas Studios
30 November 2022	Smoking Causes Coughing	

== 2023 ==
Release date	Title	Notes
4 January 2023	Father & Soldier	
25 January 2023	Neneh Superstar	
8 March 2023	The Crime Is Mine	
18 October 2023	A Difficult Year	
1 November 2023	Wingwomen	distributed by Netflix
8 November 2023	The Taste of Things	
29 November 2023	Along Came Love	
27 December 2023	The Edge of the Blade	

== 2024 ==
Release date	Title	Notes
28 February 2024	Black Tea	
20 March 2024	Out of Season	
10 April 2024	Rosalie	
17 July 2024	Almost Legal	
28 August 2024	Night Call	

== 2025 ==
Release date	Title	Notes
1 January 2025	How to Make a Killing	
28 February 2025	Bastion 36	distributed by Netflix
19 March 2025	Ma mère	
26 March 2025	Carjackers	distributed by Amazon Prime Video
9 April 2025	Moon le panda	
2 May 2025	The Biggest Fan	distributed by Netflix; Spanish-language film; co-production with Pasajero
25 June 2025	Le Grand Déplacement	
20 August 2025	Les Orphelins	
17 September 2025	Dalloway	
29 October 2025	The Stranger	
17 December 2025	L'Âme idéale	

== 2026 ==
Release date	Title	Notes
21 January 2026	The Wizard of the Kremlin	English-language film; distribution in the United States by Vertical Entertainment
18 February 2026	Le Rêve américain	
18 March 2026	The Rays and the Shadows	
15 April 2026	Juste une illusion	
5 June 2026	México 86	distributed by Netflix; Spanish-language film; co-production with Phototaxia Pictures
16 October 2026	Masterplan	distributed by Amazon Prime Video
21 October 2026	Le Roi du Game	
4 November 2026	Women on Trial	

== Upcoming films ==
Release date	Title	Notes	Production status
25 November 2026	A Good Little Soldier		Completed
6 January 2027	En haut de la pile		Completed
10 March 2027	Le mal est fait		Post-production
31 March 2027	À double tour		Post-production
9 June 2027	Possession	English-language film; distributed by Paramount Pictures; Original theatrical distributor of the 1981 film; co-production with Vertigo Entertainment, Icki Eneo Arlo and Bad Feeling	Filming
13 October 2027	High in the Clouds	English-language film; French distribution only; co-production wtih Gaumont Animation, MPL Communications, PolyGram Entertainment and Unique Features	In production
10 November 2027	5h48 : Place des Martyrs		Filming
2027	This Is How It Goes	English-language film; distributed by Apple Original Films; co-production with 22Summers and TD Afrique Films	Completed
