= Légende Entreprises =

French film production company

Légende Entreprises is a French film production company founded by Alain Goldman in 1992. Its first film was Ridley Scott's 1492: Conquest of Paradise in 1992, which was followed by Martin Scorsese's Casino in 1995. After gaining the most capital-intensive, producing a small part of the two previous blockbusters, Légende was dedicated to niche films like The Pact of Silence and Roland Joffé's Vatel in 2000. Also it produced the short film Suzy Vend des Sushis.

== Filmography ==
Title	Year	Notes
1492: Conquest of Paradise	1992	
Casino	1995	
Amour et confusions	1997	
The Guest (2014 American film)	1998	
Bimboland	1998	
Suzy Vend des Sushis	1999	
Vatel	2000	
The Crimson Rivers (Les rivières pourpres)	2000	
The Code	2002	
The Pact of Silence	2003	
99 Francs	2007	
La Vie en rose	2007	
My Own Love Song	2010	
The Man with the Iron Heart	2017	
Cyrano, My Love	2018	
The Mustang	2019	
An Officer and a Spy	2019	
The Mad Women's Ball	2021	
Flashback	2021	
