= List of Gaumont films (1980–1989) =

The following is a list of films produced, co-produced, and/or distributed by French film company Gaumont in the 1980s. The films are listed under their French release dates.

== 1980 ==
Release date	Title	Notes
4 January 1980	Le Voyage en douce	
19 March 1980	The King and the Mockingbird	
26 March 1980	Le Guignolo	
7 May 1980	Girls	
7 May 1980	Christ Stopped at Eboli	
7 May 1980	Fantastica	
11 June 1980	The Heiresses	
6 August 1980	It Rained All Night the Day I Left	
27 August 1980	The Lady Banker	
3 September 1980	Loulou	
17 September 1980	The Last Metro	
24 September 1980	La femme enfant	
26 September 1980	La terrazza	
11 June 1980	Public Telephone	
8 October 1980	The Umbrella Coup	
5 November 1980	City of Women	
12 November 1980	The Wonderful Day	
26 November 1980	Tusk	
17 December 1980	La Boum	

== 1981 ==
Release date	Title	Notes
14 January 1981	Adrien's Story	
14 January 1981	Clara et les Chics Types	
21 January 1981	La provinciale	
18 February 1981	Eugenio	
4 March 1981	The Aviator's Wife	
11 March 1981	The Lady of the Camellias	
6 May 1981	The Wings of the Dove	
11 May 1981	Three Brothers	
20 May 1981	Light Years Away	
20 May 1981	Quartet	
27 May 1981	Possession	
15 July 1981	La disubbidienza	
30 September 1981	The Woman Next Door	
21 October 1981	The Professional	
9 December 1981	La Chèvre	
16 December 1981	Eaux profondes	

== 1982 ==
Release date	Title	Notes
13 January 1982	All Fired Up	
15 May 1982	That Night in Varennes	
25 May 1982	The Hatter's Ghost	
8 September 1982	Querelle	
8 September 1982	The Big Brother	
22 September 1982	The Trout	
24 September 1982	Hécate	
29 September 1982	Il Marchese del Grillo	
27 October 1982	Ace of Aces	
8 December 1982	La Boum 2	

== 1983 ==
Release date	Title	Notes
12 January 1983	Danton	
26 January 1983	Antonieta	
2 March 1983	My Dinner with Andre	
9 March 1983	Fanny and Alexander	
6 April 1983	Entre Nous	
18 May 1983	The Moon in the Gutter	
25 May 1983	The Wounded Man	
10 August 1983	The Eyes, the Mouth	
7 September 1983	Hanna K.	
14 September 1983	Liberty Belle	
21 September 1983	My Other Husband	
19 October 1983	Sheer Madness	
26 October 1983	Le Marginal	
16 November 1983	À Nos Amours	
17 November 1982	Identification of a Woman	

== 1984 ==
Release date	Title	Notes
4 January 1984	And the Ship Sails On	
11 January 1984	Retenez Moi...Ou Je Fais Un Malheur	
18 January 1984	P'tit Con	
23 February 1984	Swann in Love	
14 March 1984	Carmen	
4 April 1984	Sandstorm	
24 April 1984	Dangerous Moves	
23 May 1984	Success Is the Best Revenge	
22 August 1984	Good King Dagobert	
5 September 1984	Le tartuffe	
19 September 1984	Souvenirs, Souvenirs	
19 September 1984	The Woman in Red	English-language film; Original owner of the 1976 film; co-production with Orion Pictures and Woman in Red Productions
17 October 1984	Love on the Ground	
19 November 1984	Par où t'es rentré ? On t'a pas vu sortir	

== 1985 ==
Release date	Title	Notes
23 January 1985	Hail Mary	
13 February 1985	Death in a French Garden	
10 April 1985	Subway	
4 September 1985	Police	
11 December 1985	Asterix Versus Caesar	

== 1986 ==
Release date	Title	Notes
5 March 1986	My Brother-in-Law Killed My Sister	
19 March 1986	Family Business	
9 April 1986	Betty Blue	
15 October 1986	The Joint Brothers	distribution only; produced by Les Films Christian Fechner and Les Films Optimistes
3 December 1986	Asterix in Britain	co-production with Dargaud Films and Les Productions René Goscinny
10 December 1986	Kamikaze	
17 December 1986	Les Fugitifs	

== 1987 ==
Release date	Title	Notes
30 December 1987	Keep Your Right Up	
1987	The Man with One Red Shoe	English-language film; Original owner of the 1972 film; co-production with 20th Century Fox

== 1988 ==
Release date	Title	Notes
24 February 1988	The Possessed	
11 May 1988	The Big Blue	English-language film; co-production with Les Films du Loup
5 October 1988	L'Étudiante	
26 October 1988	The Bengali Night	

== 1989 ==
Release date	Title	Notes
1 March 1989	My Best Pals	
29 March 1989	Un tour de manège	
12 April 1989	Roselyne and the Lions	
17 May 1989	Splendor	Italian-language film; co-production with Cecchi Gori Group and Studio E.L.
13 September 1989	Cousins	English-language film; Original owner of the 1975 film; co-production with Paramount Pictures
4 October 1989	Asterix and the Big Fight	co-production with Dargaud Films
1989	Three Fugitives	English-language film; Original owner of the 1986 film; co-production with Touchstone Pictures and Silver Screen Partners IV
