= List of Gaumont films (1950–1959) =

The following is a list of films produced, co-produced, and/or distributed by French film company Gaumont in the 1950s. The films are listed under their French release dates.

== 1950 ==
Release date	Title	Notes
29 March 1950	Les Enfants terribles	
15 September 1950	The Girl from Maxim's	
29 September 1950	The Prize	

== 1951 ==
Release date	Title	Notes
30 May 1951	The Beautiful Image	
31 October 1951	Two Pennies Worth of Violets	
28 November 1951	Alone in Paris	
30 November 1951	La Poison	

== 1952 ==
Release date	Title	Notes
30 April 1952	The Seven Deadly Sins	
11 June 1952	The Case Against X	
22 October 1952	The Moment of Truth	
31 October 1952	Je l'ai été trois fois	
14 November 1952	Beauties of the Night	
14 November 1952	Crimson Curtain	

== 1953 ==
Release date	Title	Notes
6 March 1953	A Caprice of Darling Caroline	
31 July 1953	Capitaine Pantoufle	
16 September 1953	The Earrings of Madame de...	

== 1954 ==
Release date	Title	Notes
20 January 1954	Le Blé en herbe	
4 June 1954	On Trial	
14 June 1954	Les hommes ne pensent qu'à ça	
16 August 1954	Service Entrance	
10 October 1954	Scènes de ménage	
29 October 1954	The Red and the Black	

== 1955 ==
Release date	Title	Notes
11 March 1955	Caroline and the Rebels	
7 April 1955	Razzia sur la chnouf	
9 April 1955	French Cancan	
4 November 1955	The Affair of the Poisons	
9 December 1955	The French, They Are a Funny Race	

== 1956 ==
Release date	Title	Notes
27 April 1956	Marie Antoinette Queen of France	
27 April 1956	Les Truands	
11 November 1956	A Man Escaped	

== 1957 ==
Release date	Title	Notes
22 March 1957	The Adventures of Arsène Lupin	
12 April 1957	Speaking of Murder	
13 June 1958	Girl and the River	
6 November 1957	Amour de poche	
4 December 1957	Nathalie	

== 1958 ==
Release date	Title	Notes
24 September 1958	And Your Sister?	
15 October 1958	Le Miroir à deux faces	
12 November 1958	Le insaziabili	

== 1959 ==
Release date	Title	Notes
20 March 1959	The Big Chief	
23 September 1959	Way of Youth	
29 October 1959	The Green Mare	
11 November 1959	General Della Rovere	
2 December 1959	Green Harvest	
