= List of Gaumont films (1970–1979) =

The following is a list of films produced, co-produced, and/or distributed by French film company Gaumont in the 1970s. The films are listed under their French release dates.

== 1970 ==
Release date	Title	Notes
17 April 1970	Elle boit pas, elle fume pas, elle drague pas, mais... elle cause !	
26 August 1970	The Breach	
18 September 1970	L'homme orchestre	
9 December 1970	Le Distrait	

== 1971 ==
Release date	Title	Notes
7 April 1971	The Married Couple of the Year Two	
13 October 1971	Rum Runners	
8 December 1971	Delusions of Grandeur	

== 1972 ==
Release date	Title	Notes
8 March 1972	Les malheurs d'Alfred	
1 November 1972	Repeated Absences	

== 1973 ==
Release date	Title	Notes
23 August 1973	Tony Arzenta	Co-production with Titanus
6 December 1973	The Tall Blond Man with One Black Shoe	
6 December 1973	Hail the Artist	
13 December 1973	Now Where Did the 7th Company Get to?	

== 1974 ==
Release date	Title	Notes
19 June 1974	Comment réussir quand on est con et pleurnichard	
28 August 1974	Black Thursday	
11 September 1974	The Middle of the World	
26 September 1974	Lancelot du Lac	
23 October 1974	The Slap	
18 December 1974	The Return of the Tall Blond Man with One Black Shoe	

== 1975 ==
Release date	Title	Notes
19 March 1975	Conversation Piece	co-production with Rusconi Film
16 April 1975	Act of Aggression	
18 June 1975	Weak Spot	
29 October 1975	Speak to Me of Love	
19 November 1975	Cousin Cousine	
26 November 1975	Lovers Like Us	
12 December 1975	The Seventh Company Has Been Found	co-production with Production 2000

== 1976 ==
Release date	Title	Notes
11 February 1976	Maîtresse	
18 February 1976	The Messiah	
24 March 1976	Lumière	
5 May 1976	F comme Fairbanks	
19 May 1976	The Marquise of O	
16 June 1976	On aura tout vu	
15 September 1976	Here and Elsewhere	
15 September 1976	Duelle	
15 September 1976	Dracula and Son	
22 September 1976	Pardon Mon Affaire	
20 October 1976	The Twelve Tasks of Asterix	
1 December 1976	The Big Operator	
1 December 1976	Jonah Who Will Be 25 in the Year 2000	
15 December 1976	The Porter from Maxim's	

== 1977 ==
Release date	Title	Notes
9 February 1977	Des journées entières dans les arbres	
9 March 1977	One Sings, the Other Doesn't	
15 June 1977	The Devil Probably	
10 August 1977	The Simple Past	
24 August 1977	Monsieur Papa	
7 September 1977	Spoiled Children	
14 September 1977	Gloria	
9 November 1977	Pardon Mon Affaire, Too!	
16 November 1977	Faces of Love	
7 December 1977	The Seventh Company Outdoors	
14 December 1977	Peppermint Soda	

== 1978 ==
Release date	Title	Notes
11 January 1978	Holiday Hotel	
25 January 1978	The Little Wheedlers	
19 April 1978	The Savage State	
3 May 1978	Butterfly on the Shoulder	
24 May 1978	Violette Nozière	
24 May 1978	Bye Bye Monkey	
30 August 1978	Mon premier amour	
30 August 1978	Dossier 51	
13 September 1978	Second Wind	
4 October 1978	The Song of Roland	
6 October 1978	Judith Therpauve	
11 October 1978	La Carapate	
8 November 1978	Les Rendez-vous d'Anna	
15 November 1978	Le Sucre	

== 1979 ==
Release date	Title	Notes
17 January 1979	Nosferatu the Vampyre	Co-production with Werner Herzog Filmproduktion and ZDF
7 February 1979	Perceval le Gallois	
14 February 1979	Coup de tête	
28 February 1979	Un balcon en forêt	
7 March 1979	Écoute voir	
14 March 1979	Messidor	
28 March 1979	Cop or Hood	
25 April 1979	Série noire	
9 May 1979	The Brontë Sisters	
16 May 1979	Woman Between Wolf and Dog	
23 May 1979	Félicité	
29 August 1979	Womanlight	
17 October 1979	Courage fuyons	
14 November 1979	Don Giovanni	
