= Lists of films released by Disney =

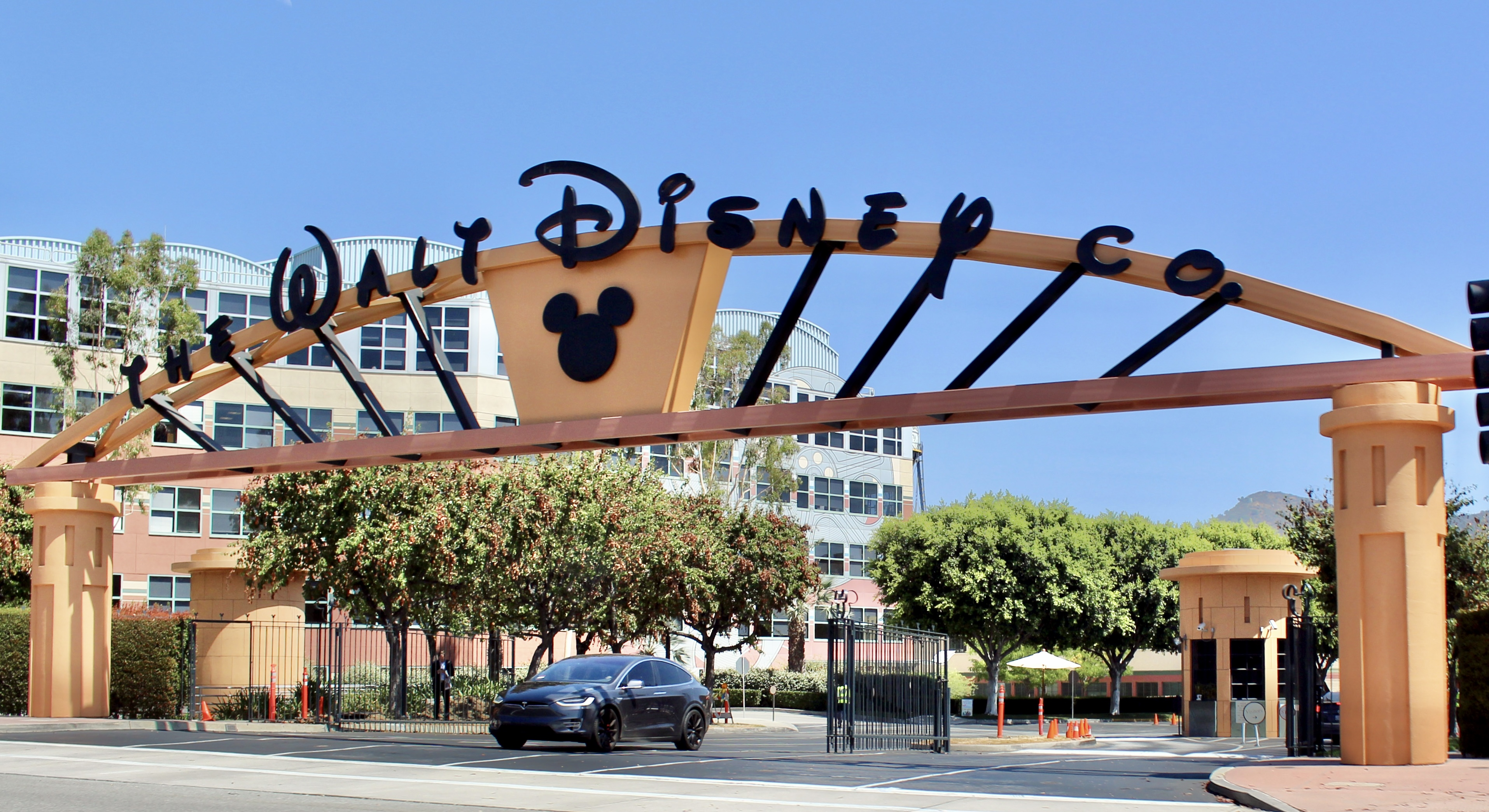
Alameda Avenue entrance to The Walt Disney Company located in Burbank, California.

These are lists of films produced and/or released by The Walt Disney Company. These list segments are made by arrays of existing, defunct, and/or divested companies, subsidiaries, and/or units. These list segments are organized by segments in Disney Entertainment. These list segments are The Walt Disney Studios, Disney General Entertainment Content, and/or Disney Streaming.

== The Walt Disney Studios ==
Lists of films include:

- Lists of Walt Disney Studios films (1937–1959 • 1960–1979 • 1980–1989 • 1990–1999 • 2000–2009 • 2010–2019 • 2020–2029)
- Lists of Walt Disney Studios Motion Pictures international films (1980–1999 • 2000–2009 • 2010–2019 • 2020–2029)

Current studios include:

- List of Walt Disney Pictures films (Walt Disney Animation Studios • Pixar • Disneynature)
- List of Marvel Studios films
- List of Lucasfilm productions
- Lists of 20th Century Studios films (Fox Film • Twentieth Century Pictures • 20th Century Fox (1935–1999 • 2000–2020 • International releases) • 20th Century Studios • 20th Century Animation)
- Lists of Searchlight Pictures films (Fox Searchlight Pictures (1995–1999 • 2000–2009 • 2010–2019) • Searchlight Pictures)

Defunct studios include:

- List of Disneytoon Studios films
- List of 20th Digital Studio films
- List of Blue Sky Studios productions
- List of Fox 2000 Pictures films
- List of Touchstone Pictures films
- List of Hollywood Pictures films
- List of Caravan Pictures films

Former studios include:

- List of films released by Dimension Films
- List of Miramax films

International brands include:

- List of Star Studio18 films

=== Short films and other productions ===
- List of Walt Disney Animation Studios short films (Laugh-O-Gram • Walt Disney Productions (1923–1928 • 1928–1939 • 1940–1949 • 1950–1959 • 1960–1985) • Walt Disney Animation Studios (1986–1999 • 2000–present))
- List of Pixar shorts
- List of remakes and adaptations of Disney animated films
- List of film adaptations of Disney attractions
- List of Disney live-action shorts
- List of Disney feature-length home entertainment releases
- List of Disney theatrical animated feature films
- List of 20th Century Studios theatrical animated feature films
- List of TV series produced by Walt Disney Studios
- List of Marvel Studios television series
- List of Mickey Mouse films and appearances
- List of Mickey Mouse universe media
- List of The Muppets productions
- List of National Geographic documentary films

== Disney Entertainment Television ==
- List of Disney television films
- List of Disney Channel Original Movies
- List of Disney television series
- List of Disney Television Animation productions
- List of 20th Television programs

== Disney Streaming ==
- List of Disney+ original programming
- List of Disney+ original films
- List of Disney+ Hotstar original programming
- List of Disney+ Hotstar original films
- List of Star (Disney+) original programming
- List of Star+ original programming
- List of Hulu original programming
- List of Hulu original films
- List of ended Hulu original programming
- List of Hulu exclusive international distribution programming
- List of ESPN+ original programming
