= List of Walt Disney Studios films (2020–2029) =

This is a list of films produced by the American film studio Walt Disney Studios, one of the Walt Disney Company's divisions and one of the "Big Five" major film studios. The list includes films produced or released by all existing and defunct labels or subsidiaries of the Walt Disney Studios; including Walt Disney Pictures, Walt Disney Animation Studios, Pixar Animation Studios, Marvel Studios, Lucasfilm, 20th Century Studios, 20th Digital Studio, Searchlight Pictures, Disneynature, Touchstone Pictures, and Hollywood Pictures. The list does not include films produced by studios that are now owned by Disney (as part of acquisitions) but were historically not distributed by Disney during their original, initial time of release.

All films listed are theatrical releases unless specified:

- Films labeled with a ‡ symbol signifies a release exclusively through Disney+ or its sister services and content hubs.
- Films labeled with a † symbol signifies a premium video on demand release through Disney+.
- Films labeled with a § symbol signifies a simultaneous release to theaters and on premium video on demand through Disney+.
- Films labeled with a * symbol signifies a release through a third-party streaming service.

== Released ==
Release date	Title	Studio release label	Notes
January 10, 2020	Underwater	20th Century Fox	co-production with Chernin Entertainment; final film produced under 20th Century Fox label
February 7, 2020	Timmy Failure: Mistakes Were Made ‡	Walt Disney Pictures	co-production with Etalon Film, Slow Pony Pictures, and Whitaker Entertainment; distributed by Disney+
February 14, 2020	Downhill	Searchlight Pictures	first film produced under Searchlight Pictures label
February 21, 2020	The Call of the Wild	20th Century Studios	co-production with 3 Arts Entertainment; first film produced under 20th Century Studios name and distributed by Disney under 20th Century Studios label
February 28, 2020	Wendy	Searchlight Pictures	co-production with Department of Motion Pictures, and Journeyman Pictures
March 6, 2020	Onward	Walt Disney Pictures	distribution only; produced by Pixar
March 13, 2020	Stargirl ‡	Walt Disney Pictures	co-production with Gotham Group and Hahnscape Entertainment; distributed by Disney+
April 3, 2020	Elephant ‡	Disneynature	distributed by Disney+
April 3, 2020	Dolphin Reef ‡	Disneynature	distributed by Disney+
June 12, 2020	Artemis Fowl ‡	Walt Disney Pictures	co-production with Tribeca Productions; distributed by Disney+
July 3, 2020	Hamilton ‡	Walt Disney Pictures	co-production with 5000 Broadway Productions, Nevis Productions, Old 320 Sycamore Pictures, and RadicalMedia; distributed by Disney+
July 31, 2020	Black Is King ‡	Walt Disney Pictures	co-production with Parkwood Entertainment; distributed by Disney+
August 14, 2020	Magic Camp ‡	Walt Disney Pictures	co-production with Team Todd; distributed by Disney+
August 21, 2020	The One and Only Ivan ‡	Walt Disney Pictures	co-production with Jolie Pas Productions; distributed by Disney+
August 28, 2020	The New Mutants	20th Century Studios	co-production with Marvel Entertainment, Genre Films, and Sunswept Entertainment
August 28, 2020	The Personal History of David Copperfield	Searchlight Pictures	co-production with FilmNation Entertainment, Film4 Productions, and Wishmore Entertainment
September 4, 2020	Mulan †	Walt Disney Pictures	co-production with Jason T. Reed Productions and Good Fear Productions; distributed by Disney+
October 16, 2020	Clouds ‡	Walt Disney Pictures	co-production with Wayfarer Studios, Mad Chance Productions, and La Scala Films; distribution pick-up from Warner Bros. Pictures; distributed by Disney+
October 23, 2020	The Empty Man	20th Century Fox	co-production with Boom! Studios; released under the 20th Century Fox name
December 4, 2020	Godmothered ‡	Walt Disney Pictures	co-production with Secret Machine Entertainment and The Montecito Picture Company; distributed by Disney+
December 11, 2020	Safety ‡	Walt Disney Pictures	co-production with Mayhem Pictures and Select Films; distributed by Disney+
December 25, 2020	Soul ‡	Walt Disney Pictures	produced by Pixar; distributed by Disney+
January 29, 2021	Nomadland	Searchlight Pictures	co-production with Highwayman Films, Hear/Say Productions, and Cor Cordium Productions
February 19, 2021	Flora & Ulysses ‡	Walt Disney Pictures	co-production with Netter Productions; distributed by Disney+
March 5, 2021	Raya and the Last Dragon §	Walt Disney Pictures	co-production with Walt Disney Animation Studios
May 14, 2021	The Woman in the Window *	20th Century Studios	co-production with Fox 2000 Pictures and Scott Rudin Productions; distributed by Netflix
May 28, 2021	Cruella §	Walt Disney Pictures	co-production with Gunn Films and Marc Platt Productions
June 18, 2021	Luca ‡	Walt Disney Pictures	distribution only; produced by Pixar; distributed by Disney+
June 25, 2021	Summer of Soul	Searchlight Pictures	co-production with Onyx Collective, Concordia Studio, LarryBilly Productions, Mass Distraction Media, RadicalMedia, and Vulcan Productions; co-distributed by Hulu and Disney+ in the United States, Disney+ internationally, and Star+ in Latin America
July 9, 2021	Black Widow §	Marvel Studios	
July 30, 2021	Jungle Cruise §	Walt Disney Pictures	co-production with Davis Entertainment, Seven Bucks Productions, and Flynn Picture Company
August 13, 2021	Free Guy	20th Century Studios	co-production with Maximum Effort, 21 Laps Entertainment, Berlanti Productions, and Lit Entertainment Group
August 20, 2021	The Night House	Searchlight Pictures	co-production with Anton and Phantom Four Films
August 27, 2021	Vacation Friends ‡	20th Century Studios	co-production with Broken Road Productions; distributed by Hulu in the United States, Disney+ internationally, and Star+ in Latin America
September 3, 2021	Shang-Chi and the Legend of the Ten Rings	Marvel Studios	
September 17, 2021	The Eyes of Tammy Faye	Searchlight Pictures	co-production with Freckle Films, MWM Studios, and Semi-Formal Productions; limited release, opened wide on September 24, 2021
October 15, 2021	The Last Duel	20th Century Studios	co-production with Scott Free Productions and Pearl Street Films
October 22, 2021	Ron's Gone Wrong	20th Century Studios	co-production with 20th Century Animation and Locksmith Animation; released under the 20th Century Studios name
October 22, 2021	The French Dispatch	Searchlight Pictures	co-production with Indian Paintbrush and American Empirical Pictures; limited release, opened wide on October 29, 2021
October 29, 2021	Antlers	Searchlight Pictures	co-production with Phantom Four and Double Dare You Productions
November 5, 2021	Eternals	Marvel Studios	
November 12, 2021	Home Sweet Home Alone ‡	20th Century Studios	co-production with Hutch Parker Entertainment; distributed by Disney+
November 24, 2021	Encanto	Walt Disney Pictures	co-production with Walt Disney Animation Studios
December 3, 2021	Diary of a Wimpy Kid ‡	Walt Disney Pictures	co-production with Bardel Entertainment and 20th Century Animation; distributed by Disney+ (Note: The film was originally in-production at 20th Century Studios, but was switched over to Walt Disney Pictures during production.)
December 10, 2021	West Side Story	20th Century Studios	co-production with Amblin Entertainment
December 17, 2021	Nightmare Alley	Searchlight Pictures	produced by Double Dare You Productions
December 22, 2021	The King's Man	20th Century Studios	co-production with Marv Films and Cloudy Productions
January 28, 2022	The Ice Age Adventures of Buck Wild ‡	Walt Disney Pictures	co-production with Bardel Entertainment and 20th Century Animation; distributed by Disney+
January 30, 2022	The Beatles: Get Back - The Rooftop Concert	Walt Disney Pictures	co-production with Apple Corps Ltd. and WingNut Films
February 11, 2022	Death on the Nile	20th Century Studios	co-production with Kinberg Genre, The Mark Gordon Company, and Scott Free Productions
February 25, 2022	No Exit ‡	20th Century Studios	co-production with Flitcraft; distributed by Hulu in the United States, Disney+ internationally, and Star+ in Latin America
March 4, 2022	Fresh ‡	Searchlight Pictures	co-production with Hyperobject Industries and Legendary Entertainment; distributed by Hulu in the United States, Disney+ internationally, and Star+ in Latin America
March 11, 2022	Turning Red ‡	Walt Disney Pictures	produced by Pixar, distributed by Disney+
March 18, 2022	Cheaper by the Dozen ‡	Walt Disney Pictures	co-production with Khalabo Ink Society; distributed by Disney+
March 18, 2022	More Than Robots ‡	Lucasfilm	co-production with Supper Club; distributed by Disney+
April 1, 2022	Better Nate Than Ever ‡	Walt Disney Pictures	co-production with 20th Century Family and Marc Platt Productions; distributed by Disney+
April 22, 2022	Polar Bear ‡	Disneynature	distributed by Disney+
May 6, 2022	Doctor Strange in the Multiverse of Madness	Marvel Studios	
May 20, 2022	Chip 'n Dale: Rescue Rangers ‡	Walt Disney Pictures	co-production with Mandeville Films; distributed by Disney+
May 27, 2022	The Bob's Burgers Movie	20th Century Studios	co-production with 20th Century Animation, Wilo Productions, and Bento Box Entertainment
June 3, 2022	Fire Island ‡	Searchlight Pictures	produced by Jax Media; distributed by Hulu in the United States, Disney+ internationally, and Star+ in Latin America
June 3, 2022	Hollywood Stargirl ‡	Walt Disney Pictures	co-production with Gotham Group; distributed by Disney+
June 17, 2022	Good Luck to You, Leo Grande ‡	Searchlight Pictures	U.S. distribution only; co-production with Genesius Pictures and Align; distributed by Hulu
June 17, 2022	Lightyear	Walt Disney Pictures	distribution only; produced by Pixar
June 24, 2022	Rise ‡	Walt Disney Pictures	co-production with Faliro House Productions; distributed by Disney+
July 1, 2022	The Princess ‡	20th Century Studios	co-production with Original Film; distributed by Hulu in the United States, Disney+ internationally, and Star+ in Latin America
July 8, 2022	Thor: Love and Thunder	Marvel Studios	
July 29, 2022	Not Okay ‡	Searchlight Pictures	co-production with Makeready; distributed by Hulu in the United States, Disney+ internationally, and Star+ in Latin America
August 5, 2022	Mija	Disney Original Documentary	co-production with Tertulia Pictures
August 5, 2022	Prey ‡	20th Century Studios	co-production with Davis Entertainment; distributed by Hulu in the United States, Disney+ internationally, and Star+ in Latin America
September 8, 2022	Pinocchio ‡	Walt Disney Pictures	co-production with Depth of Field Studios and ImageMovers; distributed by Disney+
September 9, 2022	Barbarian	20th Century Studios	co-production with Regency Enterprises, Vertigo Entertainment, Almost Never Films, Hammerstone Studios and BoulderLight Pictures
September 16, 2022	See How They Run	Searchlight Pictures	produced by DJ Films
September 30, 2022	Hocus Pocus 2 ‡	Walt Disney Pictures	co-production with David Kirschner Productions; distributed by Disney+
October 7, 2022	Amsterdam	20th Century Studios	co-production with Regency Enterprises, New Regency, and Canterbury Glass Productions
October 10, 2022	Grimcutty ‡	20th Digital Studio	co-production with Capture; distributed by Hulu in the United States, Disney+ internationally, and Star+ in Latin America
October 14, 2022	Rosaline ‡	20th Century Studios	co-production with 21 Laps Entertainment; distributed by Hulu in the United States, Disney+ internationally, and Star+ in Latin America
October 21, 2022	The Banshees of Inisherin	Searchlight Pictures	co-production with Blueprint Pictures and Film4
October 21, 2022	Matriarch ‡	20th Digital Studio	distributed by Hulu in the United States, Disney+ internationally, and Star+ in Latin America
November 11, 2022	Black Panther: Wakanda Forever	Marvel Studios	
November 18, 2022	Mickey: The Story of a Mouse ‡	Disney Original Documentary	co-production with Tremolo Productions; distributed by Disney+
November 18, 2022	The Menu	Searchlight Pictures	co-production with Hyperobject Industries
November 18, 2022	Disenchanted ‡	Walt Disney Pictures	co-production with Josephson Entertainment, Andalasia Productions, and Right Coast Productions; distributed by Disney+
November 23, 2022	Strange World	Walt Disney Pictures	co-production with Walt Disney Animation Studios
December 2, 2022	Diary of a Wimpy Kid: Rodrick Rules ‡	Walt Disney Pictures	co-production with Bardel Entertainment and 20th Century Animation; distributed by Disney+
December 2, 2022	Darby and the Dead ‡	20th Century Studios	co-production with Footprint Features; distributed by Hulu in the United States, Disney+ internationally, and Star+ in Latin America
December 9, 2022	Empire of Light	Searchlight Pictures	co-production with Neal Street Productions
December 9, 2022	Night at the Museum: Kahmunrah Rises Again ‡	Walt Disney Pictures	co-production with 21 Laps Entertainment, Alibaba Pictures and Atomic Cartoons; distributed by Disney+
December 16, 2022	Avatar: The Way of Water	20th Century Studios	co-production with Lightstorm Entertainment
December 16, 2022	If These Walls Could Sing ‡	Disney Original Documentary	co-production with Mercury Studios and Ventureland; distributed by Disney+ and Hulu
February 17, 2023	Ant-Man and the Wasp: Quantumania	Marvel Studios	
March 10, 2023	Chang Can Dunk ‡	Walt Disney Pictures	co-production with Hillman Grad and Makeready; distributed by Disney+
March 17, 2023	Boston Strangler ‡	20th Century Studios	co-production with Scott Free Productions, LuckyChap Entertainment and Langley Park Productions; distributed by Hulu in the United States, Disney+ internationally, and Star+ in Latin America
March 31, 2023	Rye Lane ‡	Searchlight Pictures	co-production with BBC Film and BFI; distributed by Hulu in the United States, Disney+ internationally, and Star+ in Latin America
April 20, 2023	Quasi ‡	Searchlight Pictures	co-production with Broken Lizard; distributed by Hulu in the United States, Disney+ internationally, and Star+ in Latin America
April 21, 2023	Chevalier	Searchlight Pictures	co-production with Element Pictures
April 28, 2023	Peter Pan & Wendy ‡	Walt Disney Pictures	co-production with Whitaker Entertainment; distributed by Disney+
April 28, 2023	Clock ‡	20th Digital Studio	distributed by Hulu in the United States, Disney+ internationally, and Star+ in Latin America
May 5, 2023	Guardians of the Galaxy Vol. 3	Marvel Studios	
May 12, 2023	Crater ‡	Walt Disney Pictures	co-production with 21 Laps Entertainment; distributed by Disney+
May 19, 2023	White Men Can't Jump ‡	20th Century Studios	co-production with Khalabo Ink Society and Mortal Media; distributed by Hulu in the United States, Disney+ internationally, and Star+ in Latin America
May 26, 2023	The Little Mermaid	Walt Disney Pictures	co-production with Lucamar Productions and Marc Platt Productions
June 2, 2023	The Boogeyman	20th Century Studios	co-production with 21 Laps Entertainment
June 9, 2023	Flamin' Hot ‡	Searchlight Pictures	co-production with Franklin Entertainment; distributed by Hulu and Disney+ in the United States, Disney+ internationally (via Star), Disney+ and Star+ in Latin America
June 15, 2023	Jagged Mind ‡	20th Digital Studio	co-production with Palabra Productions; distributed by Hulu in the United States, Disney+ internationally (via Star), and Star+ in Latin America
June 16, 2023	Elemental	Walt Disney Pictures	distribution only; produced by Pixar
June 23, 2023	World's Best ‡	Walt Disney Pictures	distributed by Disney+
June 30, 2023	Indiana Jones and the Dial of Destiny	Walt Disney Pictures	co-production with Lucasfilm; in association with Paramount Pictures (Note: As part of the 2013 deal transferring the distribution rights of future Indiana Jones films from Paramount Pictures to Walt Disney Studios, Paramount retained the distribution rights to the first four films and a residual associate credit ("in association with Paramount Pictures") in the film's credits and promotional materials, as well as "financial participation" from the film.)
July 14, 2023	Theater Camp	Searchlight Pictures	co-production with Topic Studios, Picturestart, and Gloria Sanchez Productions
July 28, 2023	Haunted Mansion	Walt Disney Pictures	co-production with Rideback
August 25, 2023	Vacation Friends 2 ‡	20th Century Studios	co-production with Broken Road Productions; distributed by Hulu in the United States, Disney+ internationally (via Star), and Star+ in Latin America
September 15, 2023	A Haunting in Venice	20th Century Studios	co-production with Kinberg Genre, Mark Gordon Pictures, and Scott Free Productions
September 22, 2023	No One Will Save You ‡	20th Century Studios	distributed by Hulu in the United States, Disney+ internationally (via Star), and Star+ in Latin America.
September 29, 2023	The Creator	20th Century Studios	co-production with Regency Enterprises and Entertainment One
October 2, 2023	Appendage ‡	20th Digital Studio	co-production with Fever Dream Studios; distributed by Hulu in United States, Disney+ internationally (via Star), and Star+ in Latin America
October 9, 2023	The Mill ‡	20th Digital Studio	distributed by Hulu in United States, Disney+ internationally (via Star), and Star+ in Latin America; final 20th Digital Studio film
November 3, 2023	Quiz Lady ‡	20th Century Studios	co-production with Gloria Sanchez Productions and Artists First; distributed by Hulu in United States, Disney+ internationally (via Star), and Star+ in Latin America
November 10, 2023	The Marvels	Marvel Studios	
November 17, 2023	Dashing Through the Snow ‡	Walt Disney Pictures	co-production with Will Packer Productions and Smart Entertainment; distributed by Disney+
November 17, 2023	Next Goal Wins	Searchlight Pictures	co-production with The Imaginarium and Piki Films
November 22, 2023	Wish	Walt Disney Pictures	co-production with Walt Disney Animation Studios
December 8, 2023	Diary of a Wimpy Kid Christmas: Cabin Fever ‡	Walt Disney Pictures	co-production with Bardel Entertainment; distributed by Disney+
December 8, 2023	Poor Things	Searchlight Pictures	co-production with Element Pictures, Fruit Tree and Film4
December 22, 2023	All of Us Strangers	Searchlight Pictures	co-production with Blueprint Pictures and Film4 Productions
February 2, 2024	Suncoast ‡	Searchlight Pictures	distributed in the United States by Hulu, Disney+ internationally (via Star), and Star+ in Latin America
March 29, 2024	Madu ‡	Disney Original Documentary	co-production with Hunting Lane Films; distributed by Disney+
April 5, 2024	The First Omen	20th Century Studios	co-production with Phantom Four Films
April 5, 2024	The Greatest Hits	Searchlight Pictures	co-production with Groundswell Productions; limited theatrical release, co-distributed in the United States by Hulu, Disney+ internationally (via Star), and Star+ in Latin America
April 22, 2024	Tiger ‡	Disneynature	distributed by Disney+
May 10, 2024	Kingdom of the Planet of the Apes	20th Century Studios	co-production with Chernin Entertainment, Oddball Entertainment and Jason T. Reed Productions
May 24, 2024	The Beach Boys ‡	Walt Disney Pictures	co-production with The Kennedy/Marshall Company and White Horse Pictures; distributed by Disney+
May 31, 2024	Jim Henson Idea Man ‡	Disney Original Documentary	co-production with Imagine Entertainment and The Jim Henson Company; distributed by Disney+
May 31, 2024	Young Woman and the Sea	Walt Disney Pictures	co-production with Jerry Bruckheimer Films
June 14, 2024	Inside Out 2	Walt Disney Pictures	distribution only; produced by Pixar
June 21, 2024	Kinds of Kindness	Searchlight Pictures	co-production with Element Pictures and Film4
July 26, 2024	Deadpool & Wolverine	Marvel Studios	co-production with Maximum Effort and 21 Laps Entertainment
August 16, 2024	Alien: Romulus	20th Century Studios	co-production with Scott Free Productions
August 23, 2024	The Supremes at Earl's All-You-Can-Eat ‡	Searchlight Pictures	co-production with Temple Hill Entertainment, distributed by Hulu in the United States, Disney+ internationally (via Star)
October 3, 2024	Hold Your Breath ‡	Searchlight Pictures	co-production with Mad Dog Films and Secret Engine; distributed by Hulu in the United States, and Disney+ internationally
October 4, 2024	Blink	Walt Disney Pictures	USA/Canada distribution only; produced by National Geographic Documentary Films, MRC, Fishbowl Films and EyeSteelFilm; Worldwide distribution held by National Geographic Documentary Films
November 1, 2024	A Real Pain	Searchlight Pictures	distribution only; produced by Topic Studios, Fruit Tree, Extreme Emotions, Rego Park, and Polish Film Institute
November 1, 2024	Music by John Williams ‡	Lucasfilm	co-production with Lucasfilm, Amblin Entertainment and Imagine Entertainment; distributed by Disney+
November 15, 2024	Elton John: Never Too Late	Disney Original Documentary	limited theatrical release; co-production with Rocket Pictures and This Machine Filmworks
November 27, 2024	Moana 2	Walt Disney Pictures	co-production with Walt Disney Animation Studios
December 6, 2024	Nightbitch	Searchlight Pictures	co-production with Annapurna Pictures, Bond Group, Defiant By Nature and Archer Grey
December 20, 2024	Mufasa: The Lion King	Walt Disney Pictures	
December 25, 2024	A Complete Unknown	Searchlight Pictures	co-production with The Picture Company and Veritas Entertainment Group
February 14, 2025	Captain America: Brave New World	Marvel Studios	
March 20, 2025	O'Dessa ‡	Searchlight Pictures	co-production with RT Features and Department of Motion Pictures; distributed by Hulu in the United States, Disney+ internationally (via Star)
March 21, 2025	Snow White	Walt Disney Pictures	co-production with Marc Platt Productions
March 28, 2025	Alexander and the Terrible, Horrible, No Good, Very Bad Road Trip ‡	Walt Disney Pictures	co-production with 21 Laps Entertainment; distributed by Disney+
April 11, 2025	The Amateur	20th Century Studios	co-production with Hutch Parker Entertainment
April 22, 2025	Sea Lions of the Galapagos ‡	Disneynature	distributed by Disney+
May 2, 2025	Thunderbolts*	Marvel Studios	
May 23, 2025	Lilo & Stitch	Walt Disney Pictures	co-production with Rideback
June 6, 2025	Predator: Killer of Killers ‡	20th Century Studios	co-production with Davis Entertainment; distributed by Hulu
June 20, 2025	Elio	Walt Disney Pictures	distribution only; produced by Pixar
July 25, 2025	The Fantastic Four: First Steps	Marvel Studios	
August 8, 2025	Freakier Friday	Walt Disney Pictures	co-production with Gunn Films and Burr! Productions
August 22, 2025	Eenie Meanie ‡	20th Century Studios	co-production with Reese/Wernick Productions; distributed by Hulu
August 29, 2025	The Roses	Searchlight Pictures	co-production with South of the River Pictures and SunnyMarch
September 19, 2025	Swiped ‡	20th Century Studios	co-production with Ethea Entertainment; distributed by Hulu in the United States, Disney+ internationally (via Star)
October 10, 2025	Tron: Ares	Walt Disney Pictures	co-production with Paradox
October 22, 2025	The Hand That Rocks the Cradle ‡	20th Century Studios	co-production with Radar Pictures and Department M; distributed by Hulu in the United States, Disney+ internationally (via Hulu)
October 24, 2025	Springsteen: Deliver Me from Nowhere	20th Century Studios	co-production with Gotham Group
November 7, 2025	Predator: Badlands	20th Century Studios	co-production with Davis Entertainment
November 21, 2025	Rental Family	Searchlight Pictures	co-production with Sight Unseen Productions
November 26, 2025	Zootopia 2	Walt Disney Pictures	co-production with Walt Disney Animation Studios
December 5, 2025	Diary of a Wimpy Kid: The Last Straw ‡	Walt Disney Pictures	co-production with Bardel Entertainment; distributed by Disney+
December 12, 2025	Ella McCay	20th Century Studios	co-production with Gracie Films
December 19, 2025	Avatar: Fire and Ash	20th Century Studios	co-production with Lightstorm Entertainment
December 19, 2025	Is This Thing On?	Searchlight Pictures	co-production with Lea Pictures
December 25, 2025	The Testament of Ann Lee	Searchlight Pictures	North American and select international distribution only; produced by Annapurna Pictures, Mid March Media, FirstGen Content, Mizzel Media, Yintai Entertainment, Kaplan Morrison and Intake Films
January 30, 2026	Send Help	20th Century Studios	co-production with Raimi Productions
February 20, 2026	Psycho Killer	20th Century Studios	distribution only; produced by Regency Enterprises, New Regency, Constantin Film, and Vertigo Entertainment
February 27, 2026	In the Blink of an Eye ‡	Searchlight Pictures	co-production with Mighty Engine; distributed by Hulu in the United States
March 6, 2026	Hoppers	Walt Disney Pictures	distribution only; produced by Pixar
March 20, 2026	Ready or Not 2: Here I Come	Searchlight Pictures	co-production with Project X Entertainment, Vinson Films and Radio Silence Productions
March 27, 2026	Mike & Nick & Nick & Alice ‡	20th Century Studios	co-production with Mad Chance Productions; distributed by Hulu
April 22, 2026	Orangutan ‡	Disneynature	distributed by Disney+
May 1, 2026	The Devil Wears Prada 2	20th Century Studios	co-production with Wendy Finerman Productions
May 22, 2026	The Mandalorian and Grogu	Lucasfilm	co-production with Fairview Entertainment
June 19, 2026	Toy Story 5	Walt Disney Pictures	distribution only; produced by Pixar
July 10, 2026	Moana	Walt Disney Pictures	co-production with Seven Bucks Productions, Flynn Picture Company and 5000 Broadway Productions
August 7, 2026	Super Troopers 3	Searchlight Pictures	co-production with Broken Lizard
August 28, 2026	The Dog Stars	20th Century Studios	co-production with Scott Free Productions
October 16, 2026	Whalefall	20th Century Studios	co-production with Imagine Entertainment and Jurassic Party Productions
November 6, 2026	Wild Horse Nine	Searchlight Pictures	co-production with Film4 and Blueprint Pictures

== Upcoming ==
Release date	Title	Studio release label	Notes	Production status
November 25, 2026	Hexed	Walt Disney Pictures	co-production with Walt Disney Animation Studios	Completed
December 4, 2026	Behemoth!	Searchlight Pictures		Completed
December 4, 2026	Diary of a Wimpy Kid Christmas: The Getaway ‡	Walt Disney Pictures	co-production with Bardel Entertainment; distributed by Disney+	Completed
December 18, 2026	Avengers: Doomsday	Marvel Studios	co-production with AGBO	Completed
February 5, 2027	Ice Age: Boiling Point	20th Century Studios	co-production with 20th Century Animation	Post-production
March 5, 2027	Gatto	Walt Disney Pictures	distribution only; produced by Pixar	In production
April 16, 2027	Monitor	Searchlight Pictures	U.S., U.K., Irish and Southeast Asian distribution only; produced by Temple Hill Entertainment	Completed
April 22, 2027	Wolf ‡	Disneynature	distributed by Disney+	Post-production
May 7, 2027	Beach Read	20th Century Studios	co-production with Original Film	Post-production
May 28, 2027	Star Wars: Starfighter	Lucasfilm	co-production with 21 Laps Entertainment	Post-production
August 6, 2027	The Bluey Movie	Walt Disney Pictures	distribution only; produced by Ludo Studio and BBC Studios	In production
September 3, 2027	The New Simpsons Movie	20th Century Studios	co-production with 20th Century Animation and Gracie Films	In production
November 19, 2027	The Families Stone	Searchlight Pictures	co-production with Groundswell Productions and Pretty Matches Productions	Filming
November 24, 2027	Frozen 3	Walt Disney Pictures	co-production with Walt Disney Animation Studios	In production
December 17, 2027	Avengers: Secret Wars	Marvel Studios	co-production with AGBO	Pre-production
March 10, 2028	Ghost Market	Walt Disney Pictures	co-production with Pixar	In production
March 31, 2028	Tangled	Walt Disney Pictures		Filming
May 5, 2028	Untitled X-Men film	Marvel Studios		Pre-production
May 26, 2028	Lilo & Stitch 2	Walt Disney Pictures	co-production with Rideback	Filming
June 16, 2028	Incredibles 3	Walt Disney Pictures	distribution only; produced by Pixar	In production
July 28, 2028	Ghost Rider	Marvel Studios	co-production with 21 Laps Entertainment	Pre-production
November 22, 2028	Clay	Walt Disney Pictures	co-production with Walt Disney Animation Studios	In production
December 15, 2028	Black Panther III	Marvel Studios		Pre-production
November 21, 2029	Coco 2	Walt Disney Pictures	distribution only; produced by Pixar	In production
December 21, 2029	Avatar 4	20th Century Studios	co-production with Lightstorm Entertainment	In development
December 19, 2031	Avatar 5	20th Century Studios	co-production with Lightstorm Entertainment	In development

=== Undated films ===
Release date	Title	Studio release label	Notes	Production status
2027	Painter ‡	20th Century Studios	co-production with Circle M+P, Infrared Pictures and Lightstorm Entertainment; distributed by Hulu	Post-production
2027	Romy and Michele 2 ‡	20th Century Studios	co-production with Laurence Mark Productions; distributed by Hulu	Post-production
2027	Sweetsick	Searchlight Pictures	co-production with Dirty Films, Film4 and House Productions	Post-production
TBA	Crush	20th Century Studios	co-production with 12:01 Films and Temple Hill Entertainment	Filming
TBA	DNA	Searchlight Pictures	co-production with Party Over Here	Pre-production
TBA	Grand Rising	Searchlight Pictures	co-production with 12:01 Films, Grey Skies Pictures and Hillman Grad	Pre-production
TBA	Horrorstör	Searchlight Pictures	co-production with New Republic, Megamix and Aperture Entertainment	Pre-production
TBA	Lunik Heist	Searchlight Pictures	co-production with Gran Via Productions and Paradox	Pre-production
TBA	Major	20th Century Studios	co-production with Harpo Productions and Scott Sanders Productions	Pre-production
TBA	Nue	20th Century Studios	co-production with Scott Free Productions, Robot Communications and Toho-Tombo	Pre-production
TBA	Playmates	Searchlight Pictures	co-production with High Frequency Pictures	Filming
TBA	Somewhere Out There	Searchlight Pictures	distribution outside the Nordics only; produced by Scanbox Production	Post-production
TBA	Spooked ‡	Walt Disney Pictures	distributed by Disney+	Pre-production
TBA	Star Wars: Dawn of the Jedi	Lucasfilm		Pre-production
TBA	Stolen Wishes	Walt Disney Pictures		Pre-production
TBA	Street Justice	20th Century Studios	co-production with Gloria Sanchez Productions	Pre-production
TBA	Test Drive	20th Century Studios	co-production with Safehouse Pictures	Pre-production
TBA	Untitled The Fly film	20th Century Studios		Pre-production
TBA	Untitled Hirokazu Kore-eda film	Searchlight Pictures		Pre-production
TBA	Untitled Kingdom of the Planet of the Apes sequel	20th Century Studios	co-production with Chernin Entertainment	Pre-production
TBA	Untitled Martin Scorsese film	20th Century Studios	co-production with Sikelia Productions, Seven Bucks Productions, Appian Way Productions, Ledbury Productions and True Story Productions	Pre-production
TBA	Untitled Prince Charming film	Walt Disney Pictures		Pre-production
TBA	Untitled Sharmeen Obaid-Chinoy Star Wars film	Lucasfilm		Pre-production

=== In development ===
Title	Studio release label	Notes
The 17th Annual Coral Gables Christmas Caroling Extravaganza	20th Century Studios	co-production with Sugar23
9 to 5 reboot	20th Century Studios	co-production with Echo Films
99 Nights in the Forest	20th Century Studios	co-production with Ghost House Pictures
Again Again Again	Searchlight Pictures	co-production with Local Time and Daniele Tate Media
American Huckster	20th Century Studios	co-production with Scott Free Productions
Anita de Monte Laughs Last	Searchlight Pictures	co-production with Hyphenate Media Group
Anomaly	Searchlight Pictures	co-production with Anonymous Content
Bad Hand	Searchlight Pictures	co-production with Brownstone Productions
Barn 8	Searchlight Pictures	co-production with Gotham Group and Waititi Pictures
The Barrier	20th Century Studios	
Big Thunder Mountain	Walt Disney Pictures	co-production with LuckyChap Entertainment and Scott Free
Bob the Musical	Walt Disney Pictures	
Bomb	20th Century Studios	co-production with Scott Free Productions
Capsule	20th Century Studios	co-production with Hutch Parker Entertainment
The Caves of Steel	20th Century Studios	
Children of the Jungle	20th Century Studios	co-production with Cara Films and Scott Free Productions
Choose Your Own Adventure	20th Century Studios	co-production with Radio Silence Productionss
Club 33	Walt Disney Pictures	co-production with 21 Laps Entertainment
Commando 2	20th Century Studios	
The Dallergut Dream Department Store	Walt Disney Pictures	
Divine Rivals	Walt Disney Pictures	co-production with Di Bonaventura Pictures
Desperation	Searchlight Pictures	co-production with Ghost House Pictures
The Devil in the White City	20th Century Studios	co-production with Appian Way Productions
Enemy Mine reboot	20th Century Studios	
The Eyes Are the Best Part	Searchlight Pictures	co-production with Jackson Pictures and Local Time
Every House Is Haunted	20th Century Studios	co-production with Raimi Productions, Starlight Media and Vertigo Entertainment
Feed	20th Century Studios	co-production with Bantu Inc.
Figment	Walt Disney Pictures	co-production with Point Grey Pictures
Fire of Love	Searchlight Pictures	co-production with Hunting Lane Films, Submarine Deluxe and Sandbox Films
Frozen IV	Walt Disney Pictures	co-production with Walt Disney Animation Studios
Gaston	Walt Disney Pictures	
The Glitch	Searchlight Pictures	co-production with Defiant by Nature
The Graveyard Book	Walt Disney Pictures	
The Gunfighter	20th Century Studios	
Hercules	Walt Disney Pictures	co-production with AGBO
Hex	20th Century Studios	
Hocus Pocus 3	Walt Disney Pictures	
Impossible Creatures	Walt Disney Pictures	co-production with Impossible Films
In Real Life	Walt Disney Pictures	co-production with Counterbalance
Incidents	Searchlight Pictures	
Inspector Gadget	Walt Disney Pictures	co-production with Wildbrain and Rideback
King Conan	20th Century Studios	
Lando	Lucasfilm	
Lazy Susans	20th Century Studios	co-production with Bond Group Entertainment
The League of Extraordinary Gentlemen ‡	20th Century Studios	co-production with 3 Arts Entertainment; distributed by Hulu in the United States and Disney+ internationally (via Hulu)
Lottery	Searchlight Pictures	co-production with Permut Presentations, 3311 and Red Crown
The Marriage Bargain	20th Century Studios	co-production with Premeditated Productions
Medusa	Walt Disney Pictures	co-production with Electro Corduroy Entertainment and Seven Bucks Productions
Merlin	Walt Disney Pictures	
Merry Ex-Mas	20th Century Studios	co-production with Higher Ground Productions
Moana 3	Walt Disney Pictures	co-production with Walt Disney Animation Studios
Mockingbird	Searchlight Pictures	
Molina	Walt Disney Pictures	co-production with Rideback, Tiara Blu Films and Viajes Miranda
Untitled Monsters Inc. sequel	Walt Disney Pictures	distribution only; produced by Pixar
Monster Jam	Walt Disney Pictures	co-production with Seven Bucks Productions and Feld Entertainment
Naughty	20th Century Studios	co-production with Hutch Parker Entertainment
Night of the Ghoul	20th Century Studios	co-production with 21 Laps Entertainment
Nova	Marvel Studios	
One Thousand and One Nights	Walt Disney Pictures	
Penelope	Walt Disney Pictures	
Persona	20th Century Studios	
Princess Diaries 3	Walt Disney Pictures	co-production with Somewhere Pictures
Rio 3	20th Century Studios	co-production with 20th Century Animation
Ripped	20th Century Studios	co-production with Seven Bucks Productions and 12:01 Films
Seconds	Searchlight Pictures	co-production with Marc Platt Productions
Sister Act 3 ‡	Walt Disney Pictures	distributed by Disney+
The Society of Explorers and Adventurers	Walt Disney Pictures	co-production with Maximum Effort
Sooner or Later	20th Century Studios	
Space Mountain	Walt Disney Pictures	
Stepsisters	Walt Disney Pictures	co-production with Party Over Here
Tender is the Night	Searchlight Pictures	co-production with LuckyChap Entertainment, Putnam PIctures and Moonslinger Productions
The Tourist	20th Century Studios	
Tower of Terror	Walt Disney Pictures	co-production with These Pictures
Treasure Island	Walt Disney Pictures	
Untitled Alien sequel	20th Century Studios	co-production with Scott Free Productions
Untitled Alita: Battle Angel sequel	20th Century Studios	co-production with Lightstorm Entertainment
Untitled Buster Keaton biopic	20th Century Studios	
Untitled Chronicle sequel	20th Century Studios	co-production with Davis Entertainment
Untitled Cruella sequel	Walt Disney Pictures	co-production with Gunn Films and Marc Platt Productions
Untitled Dave Filoni Star Wars film	Lucasfilm	
Untitled Dodgeball sequel	20th Century Studios	
Untitled Family Guy film	20th Century Studios	co-production with 20th Century Animation and Fuzzy Door Productions
Untitled The Fantastic Four: First Steps sequel	Marvel Studios	
Untitled Free Guy sequel	20th Century Studios	co-production with Maximum Effort, 21 Laps Entertainment, Berlanti Productions, and Lit Entertainment Group
Untitled Home Alone sequel	20th Century Studios	co-production with Point Grey Pictures
Untitled Jane Goodall film	Walt Disney Pictures	co-production with Appian Way Productions
Untitled John Tucker Must Die sequel	20th Century Studios	co-production with Landscape Productions, Major Studio Partners and John US Productions
Untitled Matt Rogers and Bowen Yang film	Searchlight Pictures	co-production with 3 Arts Entertainment
Untitled Master and Commander prequel	20th Century Studios	
Untitled Maze Runner film	20th Century Studios	
Untitled musical film	Walt Disney Pictures	distribution only; produced by Pixar
Untitled Prey sequel	20th Century Studios	co-production with Davis Entertainment
Untitled live-action Princess Tiana film	Walt Disney Pictures	
Untitled Scott Cooper film	20th Century Studios	co-production with Gotham Group
Untitled Shang-Chi and the Legend of the Ten Rings sequel	Marvel Studios	
Untitled Sleeping Beauty film	Walt Disney Pictures	
Untitled sixth Pirates of the Caribbean film	Walt Disney Pictures	co-production with Jerry Bruckheimer Films
Untitled Taika Waititi Star Wars film	Lucasfilm	
Untitled Taylor Swift film	Searchlight Pictures	co-production with Taylor Swift Productions
Untitled third National Treasure film	Walt Disney Pictures	co-production with Jerry Bruckheimer Films, Junction Entertainment and Saturn Films
Witness For the Prosecution	20th Century Studios	
Working Girl ‡	20th Century Studios	distributed by Hulu in the United States and Disney+ internationally (via Hulu)
The Zone	20th Century Studios	co-production with Top Dawg Entertainment
Zootopia 3	Walt Disney Pictures	co-production with Walt Disney Animation Studios

== See also ==
- List of Disney feature-length home entertainment releases
- List of Disney television films
- List of Disney theatrical animated feature films
  - List of 20th Century Studios theatrical animated feature films
- List of Disney+ original films
- List of Hollywood Pictures films
- List of Hulu original films
- List of Lucasfilm productions
- List of Marvel Studios films
- List of Star Studio18 films
- List of Searchlight Pictures films
- List of 20th Century Studios films
- List of Touchstone Pictures films
- List of Walt Disney Pictures films
- Lists of Walt Disney Studios films
- Category:Lists of films by studio
