= List of Walt Disney Studios films =

The following are lists of Walt Disney Studios films by decade:

== Lists ==
- List of Walt Disney Studios films (1937–1959)
- List of Walt Disney Studios films (1960–1979)
- List of Walt Disney Studios films (1980–1989)
- List of Walt Disney Studios films (1990–1999)
- List of Walt Disney Studios films (2000–2009)
- List of Walt Disney Studios films (2010–2019)
- List of Walt Disney Studios films (2020–2029)

=== International releases ===
- List of Walt Disney Studios Motion Pictures international films (1980–1999)
- List of Walt Disney Studios Motion Pictures international films (2000–2009)
- List of Walt Disney Studios Motion Pictures international films (2010–2019)
- List of Walt Disney Studios Motion Pictures international films (2020–2029)

== See also ==
- List of Disney feature-length home entertainment releases
- List of Disney television films
- List of Disney+ original films
- List of Disney television series
- List of Hollywood Pictures films
- List of Lucasfilm productions
- List of Marvel Studios films
- List of Fox Film films
- List of Twentieth Century Pictures films
- List of 20th Century Fox films (1935–1999)
- List of 20th Century Fox films (2000–2020)
- List of Fox Searchlight Pictures films (1995–1999)
- List of Fox Searchlight Pictures films (2000–2009)
- List of Fox Searchlight Pictures films (2010–2019)
- List of Fox Star Studios films (2009–2022)
- List of Searchlight Pictures films
- List of 20th Century Studios films
- List of Star Studio18 films
- List of Touchstone Pictures films
- List of Walt Disney Pictures films
- List of Pixar films
- List of Walt Disney Animation Studios films
