= List of Walt Disney Studios Motion Pictures international films =

The List of Walt Disney Studios Motion Pictures international films is split into:

- List of Walt Disney Studios Motion Pictures international films (1980–1999)
- List of Walt Disney Studios Motion Pictures international films (2000–2009)
- List of Walt Disney Studios Motion Pictures international films (2010–2019)
- List of Walt Disney Studios Motion Pictures international films (2020–2029)
