= Lists of Searchlight Pictures films =

The following are lists of Searchlight Pictures films by decade:

== Lists ==
As Fox Searchlight Pictures

- List of Fox Searchlight Pictures films (1995–1999)
- List of Fox Searchlight Pictures films (2000–2009)
- List of Fox Searchlight Pictures films (2010–2019)

As Searchlight Pictures

- List of Searchlight Pictures films (2020-2029)
