= Star Studio18 =

Indian film studio

- Logo used since 2025
- Formerly: Fox Star Studios (2008–2022); Star Studios (2022–2025)
- Type: Subsidiary
- Industry: Motion pictures
- Predecessor: UTV Motion Pictures (2017); Viacom18 Studios (2025)
- Founded: March 2008; 18 years ago
- Headquarters: Mumbai, Maharashtra, India
- Key people: Ajit Andhare
- Owner: Star TV (2008–2013); 21st Century Fox (2013–2019); JioStar (2019–present)
- Website: www.jiostar.com

Star Studio18 (formerly known as Star Studios and Fox Star Studios) is an Indian motion picture production and distribution company. It is a wholly owned subsidiary of JioStar (a joint-venture between Reliance and Disney India). The studio produces Hindi, Tamil, Telugu, Malayalam and other South Asian language films through acquisitions, co-productions and in-house productions for worldwide distribution.

Star Studio18 was one of the 21st Century Fox and Star India film production companies that was acquired by Disney on March 20, 2019. The studio's current name was adopted in August 2025.

Starting with the international release of Brahmāstra: Part One – Shiva (2022), all of Star Studios' films are now handled in the United States, Canada and internationally (outside of India) by Walt Disney Studios Motion Pictures.

== History ==
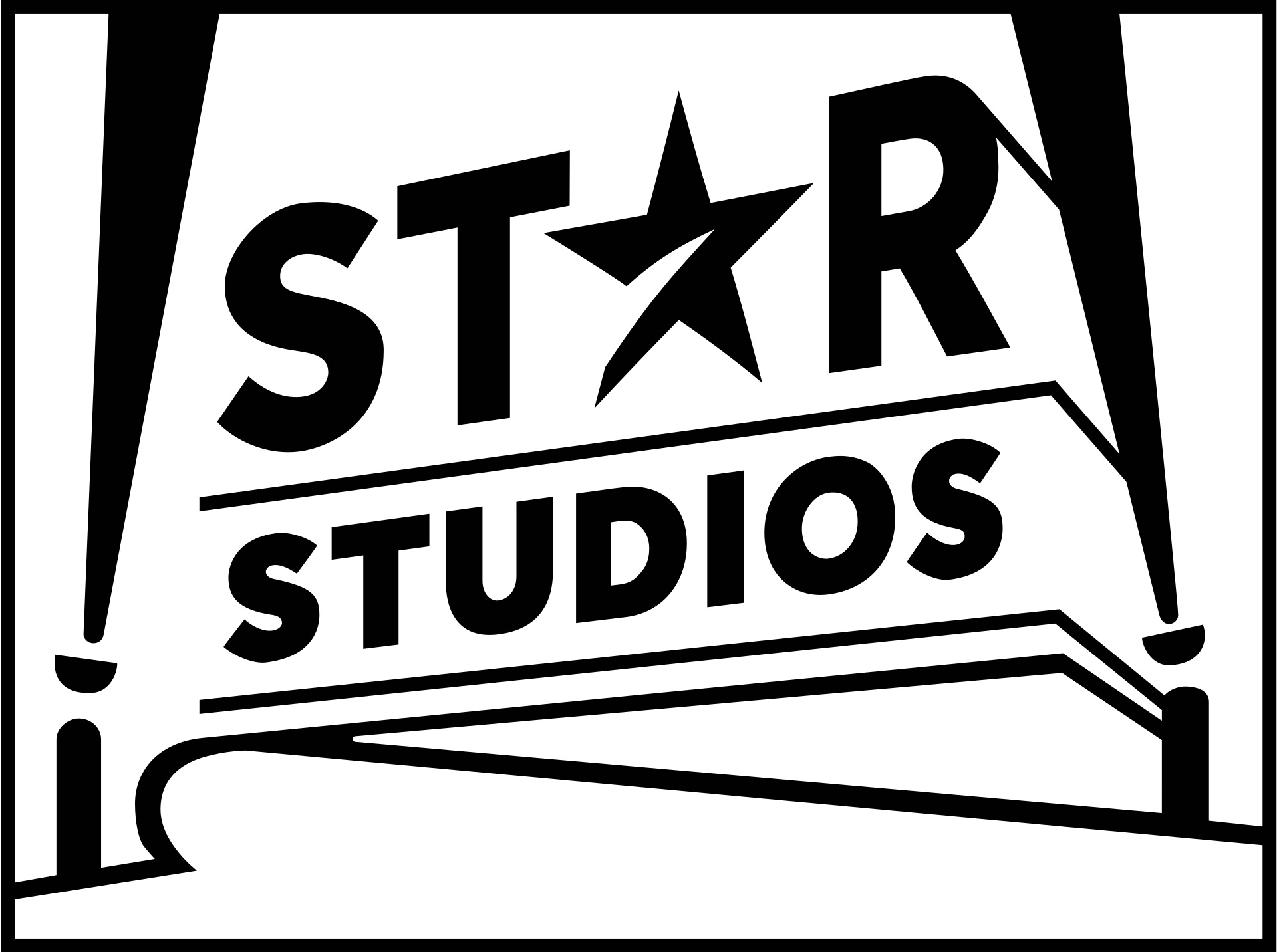
Logo used as Star Studios from 2022 to 2025.

The studio was founded in March 2008 as a joint venture between 20th Century Fox and co-owned by Star India. In December 2008, the studio acquired Indian and Pakistani distribution rights to the British film Slumdog Millionaire, its maiden release; the film would go on to win several accolades, notably the Academy Award for Best Picture. In August 2009, the studio acquired the distribution rights to My Name Is Khan, the studio's debut Indian film as distributor.

In 2011, Fox Star Studios entered the Tamil film industry with Engaeyum Eppothum, as co-producing and distributing partner for A. R. Murugadoss's AR Murugadoss Productions. In 2013, the studio released Tamil-feature Raja Rani, which won four Tamil Nadu State Film Awards. In 2015, the studio entered a 9-film deal with Dharma Productions as a co-producer and distributor. In 2016, Kapoor & Sons was released as the first film under the arrangement. The same year, the studio won National Film Award for Best Hindi Feature Film for its in-house production Neerja. The studio also released M.S. Dhoni: The Untold Story, the biopic of then Indian Cricket captain MS Dhoni. In 2017, the studio entered a three-film deal with Nadiadwala Grandson Entertainment. In May 2018, the studio entered a multi-film deal with Akshay Kumar's Cape of Good Films and had set Mission Mangal with Kumar attached to star. In 2019, the studio released Chhichhore which it co-produced with Nadiawala Grandson Entertainment had won National Film Award for Best Feature Film in Hindi 2019.

In early 2020, the studio had released Chhapaak starring Deepika Padukone, sports-drama Panga starring Kangana Ranaut and Vidhu Vinod Chopra's Shikara all of which are lukewarmly received by the audience. The studio had released Baaghi 3 at the start of the COVID-19 pandemic and the film ended its box-office run as the second-highest grossing Hindi-film of 2020. In June 2020, Star India, the parent company of the studio decided to release the rest of the 2020 slate directly on the sister streaming platform Disney+ Hotstar under Disney+ Hotstar Multiplex Initiative. The films released on the platform were Dil Bechara, Lootcase, Sadak 2, and Laxmii. In late 2020, several reports indicate The Walt Disney Company's was not going greenlighting newer films with the studio ceasing its operations after the releases of Tadap and Brahmāstra: Part One – Shiva as the studio's CEO Vijay Singh has resigned. In December 2021, the studio released Tadap. In February 2022, the studio ended speculations of ceasing operations by announcing Babli Bouncer starring Tamannaah Bhatia, co-produced with Junglee Pictures. In March 2022, the company announced the release of Kaun Pravin Tambe? on Disney+ Hotstar. Soon after the studio started production on Manoj Bajpayee starrer Gulmohar. Later that month, the studio along with Dharma Productions had acquired the remake rights for blockbuster Malayalam film Hridayam in Hindi, Tamil, and Telugu.

On 27 May 2022, Fox Star Studios was renamed Star Studios, as part of the removal of the "Fox" name from studios that had been acquired from 21st Century Fox by Disney.

After the 2024 merger of Viacom18 with Disney Star formed JioStar, it was announced in August 2025 that the studio would be renamed to Star Studio18, following Viacom18 Studios being absorbed into the new company.

== See also ==
- 20th Century Studios
- UTV Motion Pictures
- List of Walt Disney Pictures India films
- List of Walt Disney Studios films
- List of Paramount Pictures films
