= List of Walt Disney Studios Motion Pictures international films (2020–2029) =

The following list contains films which were distributed by Walt Disney Studios Motion Pictures internationally by all existing and defunct labels. This includes acquisitions as well as local-language releases.

All films listed are theatrical releases by Walt Disney Studios Motion Pictures (including Star Distribution (Latin America and Brazil) & Buena Vista International (Note: excluding Latin America as the Latin American and Brazilian branch of Buena Vista International which became Star Distribution since February 11, 2022 as Disney Latin America retired the Buena Vista brand in the region.) label or Star Studio18) unless specified.

- Films labeled with a ‡ symbol signifies a release exclusively through Disney+ or its sister services and content hubs (including JioHotstar in India).
- Films labeled with a * symbol signifies a release through a third-party streaming service.

== Released ==
Release date	Title	Studio release label	Notes
January 9, 2020	Four Enchanted Sisters	Buena Vista International	German and Austrian distribution only; blue eyes Fiction, Dor Film, FilmVergnuegen, Potemkino, Buena Vista International Film Production, Pixomondo Studios and Story House Productions
January 10, 2020	Chhapaak	Fox Star Studios	co-production with Ka Productions, Mriga Films, Avernus Productions
January 24, 2020	Panga	Fox Star Studios	
February 7, 2020	Shikara	Fox Star Studios	co-production with Vinod Chopra Films
March 6, 2020	Baaghi 3	Fox Star Studios	co-production with Nadiadwala Grandson Entertainment
March 13, 2020	Misbehaviour	20th Century Fox	UK and Irish distribution shared with Pathé; co-production with BBC Films, BFI, Ingenious Media and Left Bank Pictures; released under the 20th Century Fox name
July 24, 2020	Dil Bechara ‡	Fox Star Studios	distributed by Disney+ Hotstar
July 31, 2020	Lootcase ‡	Fox Star Studios	co-production with Soda Films; distributed by Disney+ Hotstar
August 28, 2020	Sadak 2 ‡	Fox Star Studios	co-production with Vishesh Films; distributed by Disney+ Hotstar in India and Gravitas Ventures in the United States.
August 28, 2020	Macabro	20th Century Fox	Brazilian film; released under the 20th Century Fox name
November 9, 2020	Laxmii ‡	Fox Star Studios	co-production with Cape of Good Films, Shabinaa Entertainment and Tusshar Entertainment House; distributed by Disney+ Hotstar
November 12, 2020	Alice & Só	20th Century Fox	Brazilian film; released under the 20th Century Fox name
January 1, 2021	The Last Warrior: Root of Evil	Walt Disney Pictures	distribution in the CIS only; co-production with Yellow, Black & White, Cinema Fund Russia, and Russia-1
March 11, 2021	Bad Christmas	Buena Vista International	Latin American distribution only; co-production with Aeroplano Cine, DIRECTV Original, Instituto Nacional de Cine y Artes Audiovisuales (INCAA) and Ketama
March 18, 2021	Lucicreide Vai pra Marte	20th Century Fox	Brazilian film; co-production with Downtown Filmes and Paris Filmes; released under the 20th Century Fox name
June 24, 2021	Operación Camarón	Buena Vista International	Spanish distribution only; co-production with La Pepa la Película Aie, Telecinco Cinema, La Pepa Pc, Lazona Films, Quexito Films, Mediaset España Comunicación and Movistar+
September 24, 2021	Maixabel	Buena Vista International	Spanish distribution only; co-production with Kowalski Films, Feelgood Media, Movistar+ and Televisión Española
September 30, 2021	The Intruder	Buena Vista International	Latin American distribution only; co-production with Rei Cine, Barraca Producciones, Infinity Hill Piano, Picnic Producciones Telefe and Viacom International Studios
October 14, 2021	Cato	Buena Vista International	Latin American distribution only; co-production with Amada Films and Patagonik Film Group
October 14, 2021	Amarração do Amor	20th Century Fox	Brazilian film; co-production with Downtown Filmes and Paris Filmes; released under the 20th Century Fox name
October 28, 2021	And Tomorrow We Will Be Dead	Buena Vista International	Swiss distribution only; co-production with Blue Production, Bundesamt für Kultur (BAK), Fresco Film Services, MMC Zodiac, SRG – SSR, Schweizer Radio und Fernsehen (SRF) and Zodiac Pictures
November 18, 2021	Just Short of Perfect *	Buena Vista International	Brazilian distribution only; co-production with Coração da Selva and Downtown Filmes; distributed worldwide by Netflix
December 3, 2021	Tadap	Fox Star Studios	co-production with Nadiadwala Grandson Entertainment
December 23, 2021	The Last Warrior: A Messenger of Darkness	Walt Disney Pictures	distribution in the CIS only; co-production with Disney CIS and Yellow, Black & White
January 13, 2022	Today We Fix the World	Buena Vista International	Latin American distribution only; co-production with Patagonik Film Group
February 17, 2022	Noche Americana	Star Distribution	Latin American distribution only; co-production with Bourke
February 17, 2022	A Jaula	Buena Vista International	Brazilian distribution only; co-production with Star Original Productions, Cinecolor do Brasil and Tx Filmes
February 25, 2022	Official Competition	Buena Vista International	Spanish distribution only; co-production with The Mediapro Studio; distributed by Star Distribution (Note: formerly known as Buena Vista International Latin America.) in Latin America
March 17, 2022	Vale Night	Buena Vista International	Brazilian distribution only; co-production with Querosene Films
March 31, 2022	Alemão 2	Buena Vista International	Brazilian distribution only; co-production with RT Features & Canal Brazil
March 31, 2022	Dos Más Dos	Star Distribution	Latin American distribution only; co-production with Star Original Productions & BTF Media; remake of 2012 Argentine film 2+2
April 1, 2022	Kaun Pravin Tambe? ‡	Fox Star Studios	co-production with Friday Filmworks and Bootroom Sports; distributed by Disney+ Hotstar; final film released under the Fox Star Studios name
April 14, 2022	The Broken Land	Star Distribution	Latin American distribution only; co-production with Patagonik Film Group
April 14, 2022	María Luisa Bemberg: The Echo of My Voice	Star Distribution	Latin American distribution only; co-production with Patagonik Film Group
April 21, 2022	Virus: 32	Star Distribution	Latin American distribution only; co-production with Aeroplano Cine and Mother Superior
April 26, 2022	Incompatível	20th Century Fox	Brazilian film; released under the 20th Century Fox name
April 28, 2022	The Good Boss	Star Distribution	Latin American distribution only; produced by Tripictures, Reposado PC, The Mediapro Studio and Básculas Blanco AIE
May 19, 2022	Franklin, Historia de un Billete	Star Distribution	Latin American distribution only; co-production with Buffalo Films and Navajo Films
May 19, 2022	Quatro Amigas Numa Fria	Buena Vista International	Brazilian distribution only; co-production with Warner Bros. Pictures and Gullane
July 14, 2022	Turu, the Wacky Hen	Star Distribution	Latin American distribution only; co-production with Argentina Sono Film S.A.C.I., Brown Films AIE, Gloriamundi Producciones, In Post We Trust, Instituto Nacional de Cine y Artes Audiovisuales (INCAA), Mediabyte, Pampa Films, Produccions A Fonsagrada and Tandem Films
July 21, 2022	Ela e Eu	20th Century Fox	Brazilian film; released under the 20th Century Fox name
August 11, 2022	30 Nights with my Ex	Star Distribution	Latin American distribution only; co-production with Patagonik Film Group
September 8, 2022	Más Respeto Que Soy Tu Madre	Star Distribution	Latin American distribution only; co-production with Pampa Films, Gloriamundi Producciones and Palé Producciones
September 8, 2022	Minha Família Perfeita	Buena Vista International	Brazilian distribution only; co-production with TeleCine and Total Entertainment
September 8, 2022	Soy Tu Fan: La Película	Star Distribution	Latin American distribution only; co-production with Star Original Productions & BTF Media
September 9, 2022	Brahmāstra: Part One – Shiva	Star Studios	Indian distribution only; co-production with Dharma Productions, Prime Focus, and Magic Wand Films; first film produced under Star Studios name distributed in United States by Walt Disney Studios Motion Pictures via the 20th Century Studios label and Buena Vista International in all International markets
September 23, 2022	Prison 77	Buena Vista International	Spanish distribution only; produced by Movistar Plus+ and Atípica Films
September 23, 2022	Babli Bouncer ‡	Star Studios	co-production with Junglee Pictures; distributed by Disney+ Hotstar
October 27, 2022	Abestalhados 2	Buena Vista International	Brazilian distribution only; co-production with Zencrane Filmes and Salvatore Films
November 2, 2022	La Exorcista	Star Distribution	Latin American distribution only; co-production with Star Original Productions and BTF Media
January 5, 2023	Las Fiestas	Star Distribution	Latin American distribution only; co-production with Tornado Cine, Wanka Cine & Ajimolido Films
January 19, 2023	Fervo	Star Distribution	Brazilian distribution only; co-production with Star Original Productions, Movie & TF1 Studio (Note: In the promotional of Fervo, 20th Century Studios appears as copyright holder as Star Distribution Brazil (formerly known as Buena Vista International Brazil) distributes the movie.)
January 19, 2023	El Método Tangalanga	Star Distribution	Latin American distribution only; co-production with Varsovia Films & INCAA
February 10, 2023	Titanic: 25th Anniversary	20th Century Studios	International distribution only; co-production with Paramount Pictures & Lightstorm Entertainment
February 24, 2023	Selfiee	Star Studios	co-production with Dharma Productions, Prithviraj Productions, Magic Frames and Cape of Good Films
March 3, 2023	Gulmohar ‡	Star Studios	co-production with Chalkboard Entertainment and Autonomous Works; distributed by Disney+ Hotstar
March 10, 2023	Co-Husbands	Buena Vista International	Spanish distribution only; co-production with Telecinco Cinema, Ciudadano Ciskyul, Mediaset España, Movistar+, Think Studio and Dos Maridos AIE
March 17, 2023	Sintiendolo Mucho	Star Distribution	theatrical distribution only; co-production with BTF Media and Sony Music Spain; distributed digitally by Star+
March 23, 2023	Asfixiados	Star Distribution	co-production with Orca Films, Aleph Cine, Cimarrón Cine and Blowing Mind Films
March 23, 2023	La Situación	Star Distribution	Brazilian distribution only; co-production with Star Original Productions, Migdal Filmes and Aravela Filmes
March 24, 2023	El hotel de los líos. García y García 2	Buena Vista International	Spanish distribution only; co-production with BlogMedia and RTVE
March 30, 2023	El Año del Tigre	Star Distribution	Latin American distribution only; co-production with Bou Group
April 20, 2023	Let the Dance Begin	Star Distribution	co-production with Meridional Producciones, Oeste Films, Patagonik Film Group, El Gatoverde Producciones, Áralan Films, Empieza el baile película AIE, Habitación 1520 Producciones, Sur Films and Reina de Pike Producciones; Spanish distribution by Me lo Creo
April 27, 2023	Desperté con un Sueño	Star Distribution	co-production with Pampa Films, Mutante Cine, Aramos Cine, Bocacha Films and INCAU
May 10, 2023	¿Cómo matar a Mamá?	Star Distribution	co-production with Star Original Productions and La Palma de Oro Films
May 18, 2023	Lost & Found	Star Distribution	Latin American distribution only; produced by Tandem Films, Setembro Cine, Tormenta Films, La Maleta Perdida AIE, Pampa Films, In Post We Trust and Rexin Film
July 13, 2023	Perdida	Star Distribution	co-production with Star Original Productions and Filmland Internacional
August 17, 2023	Vai ter troco	Star Distribution	co-production with Star Original Productions, Warner Bros. Pictures and Maia Produções
September 7, 2023	Oliva	Star Distribution	co-production with La Productora Films and Bourke
September 14, 2023	Welcome al Norte	Star Distribution	co-production with Star Original Productions and BTF Media
September 28, 2023	Una Flor en el Barro	Star Distribution	co-production with Lahaye Media
September 29, 2023	Tumse Na Ho Payega ‡	Star Studios	co-production with RSVP Movies, Roy Kapur Films and Earthsky Pictures; distributed by Disney+ Hotstar
November 15, 2023	Apurva ‡	Star Studios	co-production with Cine1 Studios; distributed by Disney+ Hotstar
November 23, 2023	Não Tem Volta	Star Distribution	co-production with Star Original Productions and Conspiração Filmes
December 7, 2023	O Sequestro do Voo 375	Star Distribution	co-production with Star Original Productions and Escarlate Produções
January 12, 2024	Valley of Shadows	Buena Vista International	distribution only; produced by La Terraza Films, Atresmedia Cine, Ikiru Films and El Reino de Zanskar AIE
January 25, 2024	Nosso Lar 2: Os Mensageiros	Star Distribution	co-production with Star Original Productions and Cinética Filmes
February 22, 2024	Cedo Demais	Star Distribution	co-production with Star Original Productions and Raccord Produções
March 8, 2024	Por tus muertos	Buena Vista International	co-production with Amazon Prime Video, Comunidad de Madrid, Doc Land Films and La Charito Films
March 21, 2024	Canta y No Llores	Star Distribution	co-production with AF, Ebribari, Grupo Expansión and BTF Media
March 28, 2024	Como El Mar	Star Distribution	co-production with Orca Films, Aleph Cine and Cimarrón Cine
April 18, 2024	Vidente Por Acidente	Star Distribution	co-production with Star Original Productions and Conspiração Filmes
May 16, 2024	V de Victor	Star Distribution	co-production with AF, Grupo Expansión and BTF Media
June 13, 2024	Avassaladoras 2.0	Star Distribution	co-production with Total Filmes
August 8, 2024	Culpa Cero	Star Distribution	co-production with Pampa Films
August 9, 2024	Cuerpo escombro	Buena Vista International	co-production with Morena Films
September 5, 2024	Una Jirafa en el Balcón	Star Distribution	co-production with Bourke and Balance Media Entertainment
September 19, 2024	Linda	Star Distribution	co-production with Bourke, Gloriamundi Producciones, Pampa Films
September 26, 2024	Kill the Jockey	Star Distribution	Argentine distribution only; co-production with Rei Pictures, El Despacho and Infinity Hill
September 27, 2024	I Am Nevenka	Buena Vista International	Spanish distribution only; produced by Kowalski Films, Feelgood Media, Nva Peli AIE
October 1, 2024	Un viaje al corazón: The Wingwalker	Star Distribution	co-production with Star Original Productions, Wama Films, Pa'Cha Films and BTF Media
October 10, 2024	Tudo Por Um Pop Star 2	Star Distribution	co-production with Star Original Productions, Panorâmica, Riofilme
October 10, 2024	Transmitzvah	Star Distribution	co-production with Oficina Burman
October 31, 2024	A Vilã das Nove	Star Distribution	co-production with Star Original Productions, Lupa Filmes, Riofilme
November 7, 2024	Most People Die on Sundays	Star Distribution	Argentine distribution only; co-production with Star Original Productions, Dispàrte, El Campo Cine and Nephilim Producciones
November 14, 2024	Dalia y el Libro Rojo	Star Distribution	Brazilian distribution only; co-production with Star Original Productions, Vista Sur Films, Mi Perro Producciones, FilmSharks International, Golem Studio, Doce Entertainment, Cinefilm, Matte, CG Signos Studio and Mr Miyagi Films
December 5, 2024	From Good to the Hood	Buena Vista International	Spanish distribution only; produced by Telecinco Cinema and Zeta Cinema
January 16, 2025	MMA: Meu Melhor Amigo	Star Distribution	co-production with Star Original Productions, Formata and Globo Filmes
January 16, 2025	Mesa de Regalos	Star Distribution	co-production with The MediaPro Studio
January 17, 2025	Norbert	Buena Vista International	Spanish distribution only; co-production with Capitán Araña
January 31, 2025	Mikaela	Buena Vista International	Spanish distribution only; produced by Atresmedia Cine, Atlantia Media, La Terraza Films, Ikiru Films and AP6 La Película AIE
February 11, 2025	Una Muerte Silenciosa	Star Distribution	co-production with Buffalo Films, Content Studios and Pampa Films
April 16, 2025	McMansion	Buena Vista International	co-production with Kowalski Films and Feelgood Media
April 17, 2025	Mazel Tov	Star Distribution	co-production with Preludio Producciones and Tolmur
April 25, 2025	Star Wars: Episode III – Revenge of the Sith Re-release	20th Century Studios (Worldwide); Buena Vista International (Non-USA theatrical)	Non-USA theatrical distribution only; produced by Lucasfilm; distributed in the United States, Canada and internationally by Walt Disney Studios Motion Pictures via 20th Century Studios
July 17, 2025	El Novio de Mamá	Star Distribution	co-production with Pampa Films, Gloriamundi Producciones, Dea Film and Blue Film
July 25, 2025	Sarzameen ‡	Star Studios	co-production with Dharma Productions; distributed by JioHotstar; final film released under the Star Studios name
August 14, 2025	Homo Argentum	Star Distribution	co-production with Pampa Films, Gloriamundi Producciones, Dea Film and Blue Film
September 12, 2025	The Captive	Buena Vista International	Spanish distribution only; produced by MOD Producciones, Himenóptero, Misent Producciones, MOD Pictures and Propaganda Italia
September 19, 2025	Jolly LLB 3	Star Studio18	co-production with Kangra Talkies; first film produced under the Star Studio18 name, as part of a 2024 merger between Viacom18 and Disney Star
October 23, 2025	Mauricio de Sousa: O Filme	Star Distribution	co-production with Star Original Productions, Focus Entretenimento and Boa Idea Entretenimento
October 31, 2025	Single Salma	Star Studio18	co-production with Elemen3 Entertainment
October 31, 2025	Los Tigres	Buena Vista International	Spanish distribution only; produced by Movistar Plus+, Kowalski Films, Feelgood Media, Mazagón AIE and Le Pacte
November 14, 2025	Every Side of the Bed	Buena Vista International	Spanish distribution only; produced by Telecinco Cinema, Weekend Studio, Impala and Lightbox Animation Studios
December 12, 2025	Kis Kisko Pyaar Karoon 2	Star Studio18	co-production with Venus Worldwide Entertainment and Abbas-Mustan Productions
December 12, 2025	The Great Shamsuddin Family ‡	Star Studio18	co-production with Third World Films Production; distributed by JioHotstar
January 1, 2026	My Amazing Grandma	Buena Vista International	Spanish distribution only; produced by Feelgood Media, Kowalski Films, Atresmedia Cine and Abuela Tremenda AIE
January 15, 2026	O Diário De Pilar Na Amazônia	Star Distribution	co-production with Star Original Productions and Conspiração Filmes
January 22, 2026	Familia A La Deriva	Star Distribution	co-production with Gloriamundi Producciones, Pampa Films, Tiger House Production Company, Mallorca Film House, No Idea Entertainment and Yellow Kingdom; Final film released under the Star Distribution name before Disney reverted back to Buena Vista International following the retirement of the Star brand name in the region in favor of the Hulu brand
February 6, 2026	To the Max	Buena Vista International	Spanish distribution only; produced by Mod Producciones and Arcano Financiación Audiovisual
February 26, 2026	Wolf Beach	Buena Vista International	Mexican, Latin American and international distribution only; produced by EPOS Cine, Medio Limon, Pampa Films and Zebra Producciones; Spanish distribution held by Tripictures; First film released under the relaunched Buena Vista International label following Disney's retirement of the Star brand name in the region
April 16, 2026	Rio de Sangue	Star Distribution	co-production with Star Original Productions and Intro Pictures
April 24, 2026	Dev.D Re-release	Star Studio18	re-release distribution only; in association with PVR Inox
May 21, 2026	El Partido	Buena Vista International	co-production with Industria del Milagro and Labhouse
June 5, 2026	The Light	Buena Vista International	Spanish distribution only; produced by Morena Films, Ferdydurke Films, La luz la película AIE and Potemkino
June 26, 2026	Welcome to the Jungle	Star Studio18	co-production with Cape of Good Films, Seeta Films and Base Industries Group
July 23, 2026	Hasta el Fin del Mundo	Buena Vista International	co-production with AF and BTF Media
August 7, 2026	Last Monkey Standing	Buena Vista International	distribution only; produced by MOD Producciones, Misent Producciones, MOD Pictures, and Pecaneta Producciones
August 13, 2026	Yo, narciso!	Buena Vista International	co-production with Pampa Films, Gloriamundi Films and Preludio Producciones
September 3, 2026	Pepita the Gunslinger	Buena Vista International	Latin American and U.S. distribution only; co-production with Zeppelin Studio Latin America and Historias Cinematográficas; distributed in United States by Walt Disney Studios Motion Pictures; international sales held by Film Factory Entertainment
September 24, 2026	The Fox Sisters	Buena Vista International	co-production with Sky Pictures, Wild Road and Cinética Filmes
October 1, 2026	Escondida en mi cabeza	Buena Vista International	co-production with Navajo Films and Alterna Media
October 1, 2026	Baththa	Star Studio18	co-production with A For Apple Studios and Cine1 Studios
October 2, 2026	Drishyam: The Conclusion	Star Studio18	co-production with Panorama Studios
October 8, 2026	If I Were You 3	Buena Vista International	co-production with Total Filmes; First film released under the relaunched Buena Vista International label in Brazil following Disney's retirement of the Star brand name in the region
October 9, 2026	The Blind Ants	Buena Vista International	distribution only; produced by La Zona and Sideral Cinema
October 22, 2026	Overman	Star Distribution	co-production with Star Original Productions, Migdal Filmes and Riofilme; final film released under the Star Distribution name in Brazil before Disney reverted it back to Buena Vista International
October 29, 2026	100 Days	Buena Vista International	co-production with Good Hand Production, Ventre Studio and Total Post
November 6, 2026	The Harvester	Buena Vista International	distribution only; produced by La Claqueta PC and Amania Films

== Upcoming ==
Release date	Title	Studio release label	Notes	Production status
December 4, 2026	Burundanga	Buena Vista International	co-production with 3Cat and Feelgood Media	Completed
January 1, 2027	The Brat Brigade	Buena Vista International	co-production with Morena Films	Completed
January 21, 2027	Nosso Lar 3: Vida Eterna	Buena Vista International	co-production with Cinética Filmes, FEB-Cinema and Migdal Filmes	Completed
January 22, 2027	A morte nos teus ollos	Buena Vista International	co-production with Sideral Cinema	Completed
March 17, 2027	Un funeral y medio	Buena Vista International	co-production with Hillcrest Films and Argentina Sono Film S.A.C.I.	Completed
April 16, 2027	Buitres	Buena Vista International	co-production with Cine365 Films, Ciudadano Ciskul, Think Studio, Telecinco Cinema and À Punt Mèdia	Post-production
July 16, 2027	Operacion Camaron 2	Buena Vista International	Spanish distribution only; co-production with La Pepa la Película Aie, Telecinco Cinema, La Pepa Pc, Lazona Films, Quexito Films, Mediaset España Comunicación and Movistar+	Post-production
August 18, 2027	El casoplón 2	Buena Vista International	co-production with Kowalski Films and Feelgood Media	In production

=== Undated films ===
Release date	Title	Studio release label	Notes	Production status
2027	Libre	Buena Vista International	co-production with À Punt Mèdia	Completed
TBA	Chiranjeevi Hanuman – The Eternal	Star Studio18	co-production with Abhudantia Entertainment, Collective Studios and Historyverse	Completed

=== In development ===
Title	Studio release label	Notes
Hridayam Remake	Star Studio18	co-production with Dharma Productions

== See also ==
- List of Disney feature-length home entertainment releases
- List of Disney television films
- List of Disney theatrical animated feature films
  - List of 20th Century Studios theatrical animated feature films
- List of Disney+ original films
- List of Hollywood Pictures films
- List of Hulu original films
- List of films released by Lucasfilm
- List of Marvel Studios films
- List of Star Studio18 films
- List of Searchlight Pictures films
- List of 20th Century Studios films
- List of Touchstone Pictures films
- List of Walt Disney Pictures films
- Lists of Walt Disney Studios films
- Category:Lists of films by studio
