= Jim Henson Idea Man =

2024 documentary film by Ron Howard

- Promotional release poster
- Directed by: Ron Howard
- Written by: Mark Monroe
- Produced by: Sara Bernstein; Margaret Bodde; Brian Grazer; Ron Howard; Mark Monroe; Lisa Henson; Christopher St. John; Justin Wilkes
- Starring: Fran Brill; Jennifer Connelly; Dave Goelz; Brian Henson; Jim Henson; Rita Moreno; Frank Oz
- Cinematography: Vanja Cernjul; John Chater; Igor Martinovic; Jenni Morello
- Edited by: Paul Crowder; Sierra Neal
- Music by: David Fleming
- Production companies: Disney Original Documentary; Imagine Documentaries; Fifth Season; Diamond Docs; The Jim Henson Company
- Distributed by: Disney+
- Release dates: May 18, 2024 (Cannes): May 31, 2024; (Disney+)
- Running time: 108 minutes
- Country: United States
- Language: English

Jim Henson Idea Man is a 2024 American documentary film directed by Ron Howard, about puppeteer Jim Henson.

It premiered at the 77th Cannes Film Festival, in the Cannes Classics sections on May 18, 2024. It premiered on Disney+ worldwide on May 31, 2024.

== Summary ==
The film chronicles Henson's life, from the early years of his career to the creation of properties like The Muppets, Sesame Street, and The Dark Crystal, and also focuses on his creative and romantic partnership with his wife Jane Henson. The film features interviews with family members and collaborators of Jim Henson, including Frank Oz.

== Production ==
A biographical feature film based on Jim Henson's life, known as Muppet Man, had been in development at Walt Disney Pictures and The Jim Henson Company since 2010. The project was based on a spec script written by Christopher Weekes, which had topped the 2009 Black List. In April 2021, it was reported that Michael Mitnick was hired to rewrite the screenplay, previously written by Aaron and Jordan Kandell. Lisa Henson would serve as producer.

In March 2022, another attempt to adapt Henson's life, as a then-untitled Jim Henson Idea Man, was announced with Disney Branded Television's documentary unit Disney Original Documentary now producing, stating Ron Howard and Brian Grazer's Imagine Entertainment was partnering with Disney+ on a documentary "with the full participation and cooperation of the Henson family". The film's title, as well as its scheduled release date of May 31, 2024, on Disney+, were officially announced on April 11, 2024.

== Reception ==
=== Critical response ===
On the review aggregator website Rotten Tomatoes, 98% of 61 critics' reviews are positive, with an average rating of 7.8/10. The website's consensus reads: "A rich and warm overview of Jim Henson's life and career that avoids simplistic hagiography, Ron Howard's documentary will give audiences a much clearer idea of the pioneering puppeteer's artistry." Metacritic, which uses a weighted average, assigned the film a score of 69 out of 100, based on 13 critics, indicating "generally favorable" reviews.

Michael Nordine of Variety felt Idea Man is a conventional documentary "whose feel-good charms are undercut only slightly by its adherence to the tried-and-true nonfiction formula ... If it's easy to wish Idea Man were as bold as its subject, though, it's just as easy to be won over by this deservedly heartfelt tribute to him." Matthew Carey of Deadline Hollywood reflected on the prior documentaries made about Henson's life and career, but felt "[Ron] Howard brings fresh energy to the subject through the skillful use of animations based on Henson's impressive drawings and wonderful archival rarities that go beyond what has been seen in previous treatments of Henson's life."

For The Hollywood Reporter, Daniel Feinberg wrote Idea Man "delivers less perspective on Henson's personality and motivations than sheer evidence of his drive. That's fine, and the documentary is fine. Anybody with affection for Henson and his work will get the requisite laughs, nostalgia and probably emotions from the footage Howard assembled here." Kate Erbland of Indiewire graded the film a B+, writing despite the star-studded interview appearances, "Howard leans into honesty. The film is so much better for it, even as it can't quite capture the full magic and scope of Henson's life and work."

=== Accolades ===
Accolades for Jim Henson Idea Man
Award	Date of ceremony	Category	Recipient(s)	Result	Ref.
American Cinema Editors Awards	March 14, 2025	Best Edited Documentary (Theatrical)	Sierra Neal and Paul Crowder	Nominated	
Astra TV Awards	December 8, 2024	Best Documentary	Jim Henson Idea Man	Nominated	
Cannes Film Festival	May 24, 2024	L'Œil d'or	Ron Howard	Nominated	
Cinema Audio Society Awards	February 22, 2025	Outstanding Achievement in Sound Mixing for Television – Non-Fiction, Variety, or Music/Series or Specials	Liviu Lupsa, Tony Volante, Dan Timmons, Casey Stone, JJ Suelto, and Ryan Collison	Nominated	
Critics' Choice Documentary Awards	November 10, 2024	Best Documentary Feature	Jim Henson Idea Man	Nominated	
Critics' Choice Documentary Awards	November 10, 2024	Best Director	Ron Howard	Nominated	
Critics' Choice Documentary Awards	November 10, 2024	Best Archival Documentary	Jim Henson Idea Man	Nominated	
Critics' Choice Documentary Awards	November 10, 2024	Best Biographical Documentary	Jim Henson Idea Man	Nominated	
Critics' Choice Documentary Awards	November 10, 2024	Best Editing	Paul Crowder	Nominated	
Golden Reel Awards	February 23, 2025	Outstanding Achievement in Music Editing – Documentary	Ryan Rubin	Nominated	
Golden Reel Awards	February 23, 2025	Outstanding Achievement in Sound Editing – Non-Theatrical Documentary	Daniel Timmons, Tony Volante, Jeremy S. Bloom, Kelly Rodriguez, and Ian Cymore	Nominated	
Hollywood Music in Media Awards	November 20, 2024	Best Original Score in a Documentary	David Fleming	Nominated	
Primetime Emmy Awards	September 7, 2024	Outstanding Documentary or Nonfiction Special	Brian Grazer, Ron Howard, Sara Bernstein, Margaret Bodde, Justin Wilkes, Mark Monroe, and Christopher St. John	Won	
Primetime Emmy Awards	September 7, 2024	Outstanding Directing for a Documentary/Nonfiction Program	Ron Howard	Nominated	
Primetime Emmy Awards	September 7, 2024	Outstanding Writing for a Nonfiction Program	Mark Monroe	Nominated	
Primetime Emmy Awards	September 7, 2024	Outstanding Cinematography for a Nonfiction Program	Igor Martinovic and Vanja Cernjul	Nominated	
Primetime Emmy Awards	September 7, 2024	Outstanding Motion Design	Mark Thompson, Seamus Walsh, Mark Caballero, Ivan Viaranchyk, Max Strizich, and Momo Zhao	Won	
Primetime Emmy Awards	September 7, 2024	Outstanding Music Composition for a Documentary Series or Special (Original Dramatic Score)	David Fleming	Won	
Primetime Emmy Awards	September 7, 2024	Outstanding Picture Editing for a Nonfiction Program	Sierra Neal and Paul Crowder	Won	
Primetime Emmy Awards	September 7, 2024	Outstanding Sound Editing for a Nonfiction or Reality Program	Daniel Timmons, Jeremy S. Bloom, Ian Cymore, and Ryan Rubin	Won	
Primetime Emmy Awards	September 7, 2024	Outstanding Sound Mixing for a Nonfiction Program	Tony Volante and Michael Jones	Nominated	
Writers Guild of America Awards	February 15, 2025	Best Documentary Screenplay	Mark Monroe	Won	
