= List of Walt Disney Studios films (1960–1979) =

This is a list of films produced and distributed by the American film studio Walt Disney Studios, one of the Walt Disney Company's divisions and one of the "Big Five" major film studios. The list includes films produced or released by all existing and defunct labels or subsidiaries of the Walt Disney Studios; including Walt Disney Pictures, Walt Disney Animation Studios, Pixar Animation Studios, Marvel Studios, Lucasfilm, 20th Century Studios, Searchlight Pictures, Blue Sky Studios, Disneynature, Touchstone Pictures, and Hollywood Pictures. The list does not include films produced by studios that are now owned by Disney (as part of acquisitions), but were historically not distributed by Disney during their original, initial time of release.

All films listed are theatrical releases by Buena Vista Distribution Company, Inc. unless specified.

== 1960s ==
Release date	Title	Studio
January 21, 1960	Toby Tyler	Walt Disney Productions
February 24, 1960	Kidnapped	Walt Disney Productions
May 19, 1960	Pollyanna	Walt Disney Productions
June 11, 1960	The Sign of Zorro (Compilation film)	Walt Disney Productions
August 10, 1960	Jungle Cat	Walt Disney Productions
November 1, 1960	Ten Who Dared	Walt Disney Productions
December 21, 1960	Swiss Family Robinson	Walt Disney Productions
January 25, 1961	One Hundred and One Dalmatians	Walt Disney Productions
March 16, 1961	The Absent-Minded Professor	Walt Disney Productions
June 21, 1961	The Parent Trap	Walt Disney Productions
July 12, 1961	Nikki, Wild Dog of the North	Walt Disney Productions
July 17, 1961	Greyfriars Bobby	Walt Disney Productions
December 14, 1961	Babes in Toyland	Walt Disney Productions
April 5, 1962	Moon Pilot	Walt Disney Productions
May 17, 1962	Bon Voyage!	Walt Disney Productions
June 6, 1962	Big Red	Walt Disney Productions
September 26, 1962	Almost Angels	Walt Disney Productions
November 7, 1962	The Legend of Lobo	Walt Disney Productions
December 21, 1962	In Search of the Castaways	Walt Disney Productions
January 16, 1963	Son of Flubber	Walt Disney Productions
March 29, 1963	Miracle of the White Stallions	Walt Disney Productions
June 1, 1963	Savage Sam	Walt Disney Productions
July 7, 1963	Summer Magic	Walt Disney Productions
November 20, 1963	The Incredible Journey	Walt Disney Productions
December 25, 1963	The Sword in the Stone	Walt Disney Productions
December 25, 1963 (UK only)	Dr. Syn, Alias the Scarecrow (Compilation film)	Walt Disney Productions
March 12, 1964	A Tiger Walks	Walt Disney Productions
March 25, 1964	The Misadventures of Merlin Jones	Walt Disney Productions
June 4, 1964	The Three Lives of Thomasina	Walt Disney Productions
July 8, 1964	The Moon-Spinners	Walt Disney Productions
August 27, 1964	Mary Poppins	Walt Disney Productions
December 18, 1964	Emil and the Detectives	Walt Disney Productions
January 28, 1965	Those Calloways	Walt Disney Productions
August 18, 1965	The Monkey's Uncle	Walt Disney Productions
December 2, 1965	That Darn Cat!	Walt Disney Productions
February 16, 1966	The Ugly Dachshund	Walt Disney Productions
July 29, 1966	Lt. Robin Crusoe, U.S.N.	Walt Disney Productions
October 1, 1966	The Fighting Prince of Donegal	Walt Disney Productions
December 1, 1966	Follow Me, Boys!	Walt Disney Productions
February 8, 1967	Monkeys, Go Home!	Walt Disney Productions
March 8, 1967	The Adventures of Bullwhip Griffin	Walt Disney Productions
July 19, 1967	The Gnome-Mobile	Walt Disney Productions
October 18, 1967	Charlie, the Lonesome Cougar	Walt Disney Productions
October 18, 1967	The Jungle Book	Walt Disney Productions
November 30, 1967	The Happiest Millionaire	Walt Disney Productions
February 8, 1968	Blackbeard's Ghost	Walt Disney Productions
March 21, 1968	The One and Only, Genuine, Original Family Band	Walt Disney Productions
June 26, 1968	Never a Dull Moment	Walt Disney Productions
December 20, 1968	The Horse in the Gray Flannel Suit	Walt Disney Productions
December 24, 1968	The Love Bug	Walt Disney Productions
February 16, 1969	Don't Look Now... We're Being Shot At!	distribution only
March 21, 1969	Smith!	Walt Disney Productions
June 11, 1969	Rascal	Walt Disney Productions
December 24, 1969	The Computer Wore Tennis Shoes	Walt Disney Productions

== 1970s ==
Release date	Title	Studio
February 11, 1970	King of the Grizzlies	Walt Disney Productions
July 1, 1970	The Boatniks	Walt Disney Productions
December 15, 1970	The Wild Country	Walt Disney Productions
December 24, 1970	The Aristocats	Walt Disney Productions
March 17, 1971	The Barefoot Executive	Walt Disney Productions
June 22, 1971	Scandalous John	Walt Disney Productions
June 30, 1971	The Million Dollar Duck	Walt Disney Productions
December 13, 1971	Bedknobs and Broomsticks	Walt Disney Productions
March 22, 1972	The Biscuit Eater	Walt Disney Productions
July 12, 1972	Now You See Him, Now You Don't	Walt Disney Productions
July 19, 1972	Napoleon and Samantha	Walt Disney Productions
October 18, 1972	Run, Cougar, Run	Walt Disney Productions
December 22, 1972	Snowball Express	Walt Disney Productions
February 14, 1973	The World's Greatest Athlete	Walt Disney Productions
March 23, 1973	Charley and the Angel	Walt Disney Productions
June 20, 1973	One Little Indian	Walt Disney Productions
November 8, 1973	Robin Hood	Walt Disney Productions
December 14, 1973	Superdad	Walt Disney Productions
June 6, 1974	Herbie Rides Again	Walt Disney Productions
July 31, 1974	The Bears and I	Walt Disney Productions
August 1, 1974	The Castaway Cowboy	Walt Disney Productions
December 20, 1974	The Island at the Top of the World	Walt Disney Productions
February 6, 1975	The Strongest Man in the World	Walt Disney Productions
March 21, 1975	Escape to Witch Mountain	Walt Disney Productions
July 1, 1975	The Apple Dumpling Gang	Walt Disney Productions
July 9, 1975	One of Our Dinosaurs Is Missing	Walt Disney Productions
October 8, 1975	The Best of Walt Disney's True-Life Adventures	Walt Disney Productions
December 25, 1975	Ride a Wild Pony	Walt Disney Productions
February 5, 1976	No Deposit, No Return	Walt Disney Productions
July 1, 1976	Treasure of Matecumbe	Walt Disney Productions
July 7, 1976	Gus	Walt Disney Productions
December 17, 1976	The Shaggy D.A.	Walt Disney Productions
December 17, 1976	Freaky Friday	Walt Disney Productions
March 11, 1977	The Littlest Horse Thieves	Walt Disney Productions
March 11, 1977	The Many Adventures of Winnie the Pooh	Walt Disney Productions
June 22, 1977	A Tale of Two Critters (featurette)	Walt Disney Productions
June 22, 1977	The Rescuers	Walt Disney Productions
June 24, 1977	Herbie Goes to Monte Carlo	Walt Disney Productions
November 3, 1977	Pete's Dragon	Walt Disney Productions
December 16, 1977	Candleshoe	Walt Disney Productions
March 10, 1978	Return from Witch Mountain	Walt Disney Productions
June 9, 1978	The Cat from Outer Space	Walt Disney Productions
July 5, 1978	Hot Lead and Cold Feet	Walt Disney Productions
January 1, 1979	Take Down	distribution only; produced by American Film Consortium
February 9, 1979	The North Avenue Irregulars	Walt Disney Productions
June 27, 1979	The Apple Dumpling Gang Rides Again	Walt Disney Productions
July 26, 1979	Unidentified Flying Oddball	Walt Disney Productions
December 21, 1979	The Black Hole	Walt Disney Productions

== See also ==
- List of Disney feature-length home entertainment releases
- List of Disney television films
- List of Disney+ original films
- List of Hollywood Pictures films
- List of films released by Lucasfilm
- List of Marvel Studios films
- List of Searchlight Pictures films
- List of 20th Century Studios films
- List of Touchstone Pictures films
- List of Walt Disney Pictures films
- Category:Lists of films by studio
