= Mickey: The Story of a Mouse =

2022 American documentary film

- Official release poster
- Directed by: Jeff Malmberg
- Produced by: Meghan Walsh; Chris Shellen; Morgan Neville
- Cinematography: Antonio Cisneros
- Edited by: Jake Hostetter; Aaron Wickenden
- Music by: Daniel Wohl
- Production companies: Disney Original Documentary; Tremolo Productions
- Distributed by: Disney+
- Release dates: March 19, 2022 (SXSW); November 18, 2022 (United States)
- Running time: 93 minutes
- Country: United States
- Language: English

Mickey: The Story of a Mouse is a documentary film directed by Jeff Malmberg. The documentary had its world premiere at the South by Southwest film festival on March 19, 2022, and had its worldwide release on November 18 of the same year, on Disney+, on the same day as Mickey Mouse's 94th birthday.

== Premise ==
The documentary follows the history and filmography of Mickey Mouse. Mickey Mouse is presented as a worldwide symbol of joy and the innocence of childhood. He became an overnight sensation after starring in the 1928 animated short film Steamboat Willie. Over the decades that followed, versions of the character evolved that reflect both the career of their creator and the changes in the country Mickey came to symbolize.

== Production and release ==
By October 2019, the documentary was in production, with Jeff Malmberg as director.

The documentary had its world premiere at the South by Southwest film festival on March 19, 2022, before its debut on Disney+ on November 18 in the same year. The documentary is accompanied by the short film Mickey in a Minute, animated by Eric Goldberg, Mark Henn, and Randy Haycock. The short follows Mickey Mouse, voiced by Bret Iwan, as he tours the halls of the Disney Animation building, ends up sucked into one of his old cartoon posters and takes a "whirlwind" trip through his past performances. The short appears near the end of the documentary.

=== Critical reception ===
On the review aggregator website Rotten Tomatoes, 89% of 19 critics' reviews are positive, with an average rating of 7.8/10. On Metacritic, the film has a weighted average score of 66 out of 100, based on 7 critics, indicating "generally favorable reviews".

Fran Hoepfner, of TheWrap, gave a positive review, saying it is an "interesting exploration of a global phenomenon that goes out of its way to let Disney (the man and the company) off the hook". Daniel Fienberg, of The Hollywood Reporter, also gave a positive review, saying: "Offering 93 minutes of radiant rodent hagiography, Mickey: The Story of a Mouse is maybe the most polished of Disney+'s recent documercials". Stephen Silver of Tilt gave 4 stars out of 5. He considered the documentary to be "a blatant act of self-mythologizing by Disney", but also called it "a fascinating examination of Disney history and a must-watch for anyone who's a big Mickey fan". Ross Bonaime, of Collider, gave a mixed review, saying the documentary is "an intriguing look at the century-long history of Mickey that can't help but try to avoid the biggest questions of Mickey and Walt Disney's past".
