= List of Walt Disney Studios Motion Pictures international films (1980–1999) =

The following list contains films which were distributed by Walt Disney Studios Motion Pictures internationally by all existing and defunct labels. This includes acquisitions as well as local-language releases.

All films listed are theatrical releases by Buena Vista International unless specified.

== 1980s ==
| Release date | Title | Studio release label | Notes |
|---|---|---|---|
| December 12, 1980 | Popeye | Walt Disney Productions | International distribution only; co-production with Paramount Pictures, Robert Evans Productions and King Features Entertainment |
| June 26, 1981 | Dragonslayer | Walt Disney Productions | International distribution only; co-production with Paramount Pictures |

== 1990s ==
| Release date | Title | Studio release label | Notes |
|---|---|---|---|
| October 15, 1993 | Mr. Wonderful | Buena Vista International | select international distribution only; Night Life Inc. and The Samuel Goldwyn Company |
| March 11, 1994 | Lightning Jack | Buena Vista International | international distribution outside Australia and New Zealand only; Village Roadshow Pictures |
| March 24, 1994 | Pumuckl und der blaue Klabauter | Buena Vista International | German and Austrian theatrical distribution only; Infafilm |
| May 11, 1994 | The Crow | Buena Vista International | distribution in South Africa, France, Germany, Austria, Switzerland, Spain, the Benelux, Portugal, Greece, Cyprus and select Asian territories including India only |
| November 7, 1994 | Nobody Loves Me | Buena Vista International | German and Austrian distribution only; Cobra Film |
| November 18, 1994 | Léon | Buena Vista International | distribution in the U.K., Ireland, Australia, New Zealand, Spain, the Benelux and Scandinavia only; Gaumont |
| April 6, 1995 | La nave de los locos | Buena Vista International | Spanish distribution only |
| May 19, 1995 | Die Hard with a Vengeance | Buena Vista International | distribution in Latin America, the U.K., Ireland, South Africa, France, Germany, Austria, Switzerland, the Benelux, the Nordics, Portugal, Spain, Greece, Cyprus and Taiwan only; 20th Century Fox and Cinergi Pictures |
| October 11, 1995 | Les Anges gardiens | Buena Vista International | Benelux, German and Austrian distribution only; Gaumont |
| October 26, 1995 | Talk of the Town | Buena Vista International | German and Austrian distribution only; Studio Hamburg Produktion and ZDF Enterprises |
| April 4, 1996 | Silent Night | Buena Vista International | German distribution only; X-Filme Creative Pool, Fool Film and Fama Film |
| April 19, 1996 | Portland | Buena Vista International | Danish distribution only; Zentropa Entertainment |
| June 28, 1996 | Aquí llega Condemor, el pecador de la pradera | Buena Vista International | Spanish distribution only; Producciones A.S.H., Antena 3, Canal+ |
| August 9, 1996 | The Disappearance of Finbar | Buena Vista International | Irish distribution only |
| October 31, 1996 | Father's Day | Buena Vista International | German and Austrian distribution only; Hager Moss Film KG and ProSieben |
| November 15, 1996 | Killer Tongue | Buena Vista International | Spanish theatrical distribution only; Sogetel, Lolafilms |
| November 22, 1996 | Shine | Miramax Films | distribution in Latin America, the U.K., Ireland, France, Germany, Austria, Switzerland, Spain and the Benelux only |
| December 19, 1996 | Beyond Silence | Buena Vista International | German and Austria distribution only; Claussen + Wöbke Filmproduktion and Roxy Film |
| January 17, 1997 | Actrius | Buena Vista International | Spanish distribution only; Canal+ España, Els Films de la Rambla S.A., Generalitat de Catalunya - Departament de Cultura and Televisión Española |
| January 24, 1997 | Far from Africa | Buena Vista International | |
| February 21, 1997 | Knockin' on Heaven's Door | Touchstone Pictures | German, Austrian and Spanish distribution only; Mr. Brown Entertainment and Buena Vista International Filmproduktion (Germany) |
| April 17, 1997 | Character | Buena Vista International | Benelux distribution only; First Floor Features |
| May 7, 1997 | The Fifth Element | Buena Vista International | Benelux and Scandinavian distribution only; Gaumont |
| June 27, 1997 | Face/Off | Touchstone Pictures | International distribution only; Paramount Pictures and Permut Presentations |
| July 3, 1997 | Bandits | Buena Vista International | German and Austrian distribution only; Olga-Film |
| July 25, 1997 | Air Force One | Buena Vista International | International distribution only; Beacon Pictures and Radiant Productions |
| August 7, 1997 | Ashes of Paradise | Buena Vista International | Argentine and Spanish distribution only; Artear, Patagonik Film Group and Promofilm S.A. |
| August 22, 1997 | Bracula: Condemor II | Buena Vista International | Spanish distribution only; Producciones PASH and Canal+; |
| September 12, 1997 | The End of Violence | Buena Vista International | German and Austrian distribution only; CiBy 2000 Pictures, Road Movies Filmproduktion and Kintop Pictures |
| October 24, 1997 | FairyTale: A True Story | Buena Vista International | Dutch and Scandinavian distribution only; Icon Productions |
| November 7, 1997 | Starship Troopers | Touchstone Pictures | International distribution only; TriStar Pictures |
| November 7, 1997 | 99.9 | Buena Vista International | Spanish distribution only; Origen and Impala |
| January 2, 1998 | Deconstructing Harry | Buena Vista International | U.K. and Irish distribution only; Sweeetland Films and Jean Doumanian Productions |
| January 23, 1998 | Tangos Are for Two | Buena Vista International | Patagonik Film Group, Aurum Producciones, Rocabruno |
| January 23, 1998 | The Visitors II: The Corridors of Time | Buena Vista International | Benelux, Swiss and Spanish distribution only; Gaumont |
| January 30, 1998 | Hamilton | Buena Vista International | Scandinavian and Benelux distribution only; Moviola and TV4 (Sweden) |
| February 6, 1998 | The Ice Storm | Buena Vista International | U.K., Irish, Benelux theatrical and Scandinavian distribution only; Good Machine |
| March 5, 1998 | Four for Venice | Buena Vista International | German and Austrian distribution only; Olga-Film |
| May 15, 1998 | The Cyclone | Buena Vista International | International distribution outside Germany, Austria, Switzerland, Scandinavia and Hong Kong only; Cecchi Gori Group |
| May 21, 1998 | Sieben Monde | Buena Vista International | German and Austrian distribution only |
| May 28, 1998 | Cohen vs. Rosi | Buena Vista International | distribution only; Patagonik Film Group |
| June 24, 1998 | I Went Down | Buena Vista International | U.K. and Irish distribution only; BBC Films, Bórd Scannán na hÉireann, Easkel Media, Raidió Teilifís Éireann, Irish Film Board, Shooting Gallery and Treasure Entertainment |
| July 31, 1998 | Going to Kansas City | Buena Vista International | Finnish distribution only; Mandart Entertainment and Telescene Film Group |
| August 7, 1998 | Snake Eyes | Touchstone Pictures | International distribution only; Paramount Pictures and DeBart Productions |
| August 27, 1998 | Love Scenes from Planet Earth | Buena Vista International | German and Austrian distribution only; Sam Film Produktion |
| October 8, 1998 | Serengeti Symphony | Walt Disney Pictures | Benelux distribution only; Nature Conservation Films |
| October 9, 1998 | A Summer by the River | Buena Vista International | Finnish distribution only; Fennada-Filmi |
| December 18, 1998 | Papa Piquillo | Buena Vista International | Spanish distribution only; Via Digital, Producciones PASH, S.A |
| January 14, 1999 | 23 | Buena Vista International | German and Austrian distribution only; Claussen + Wöbke Filmproduktion |
| January 15, 1999 | The Tough Ones | Buena Vista International | Finnish distribution only; Solar Films |
| January 29, 1999 | Dirty Linen | Buena Vista International | Italian theatrical co-distribution with Compagnia Distribuzione Internazionale only |
| March 11, 1999 | Annaluise & Anton | Buena Vista International | German and Austrian distribution only; Bavaria Filmverleih- und Produktions-GmbH and Lunaris Film |
| April 30, 1999 | The Yellow Fountain | Buena Vista International | Spanish distribution only; Mata Production and U.G.C. International |
| July 30, 1999 | Runaway Bride | Touchstone Pictures | international distribution outside Italy, Greece, Cyprus, Taiwan, the Middle East, Israel, Turkey, Eastern Europe and the CIS only; Paramount Pictures, Interscope Communications and Lakeshore Entertainment |
| October 14, 1999 | De rode zwaan | Buena Vista International | Dutch distribution only; First Floor Features and AVRO |
| October 22, 1999 | Bringing Out the Dead | Touchstone Pictures | International distribution only; Paramount Pictures and Scott Rudin Productions |
| November 4, 1999 | Do Not Disturb | Buena Vista International | Dutch distribution only; First Floor Features and CTL-UFA International |
| November 24, 1999 | End of Days | Buena Vista International | international distribution outside Australia, New Zealand, Greece, Cyprus, France, the Benelux, Japan and Turkey only; Beacon Pictures |
| December 9, 1999 | Little Crumb | Buena Vista International | Benelux distribution only; Shooting Star Filmcompany and Katholieke Radio Omroep |
| December 29, 1999 | The Hurricane | Buena Vista International | international distribution outside Australia, New Zealand, Greece, Cyprus, France, the Benelux, Japan and Turkey only; Beacon Pictures and Azoff Films |

== See also ==
- List of Disney feature-length home entertainment releases
- List of Disney television films
- List of Disney theatrical animated feature films
  - List of 20th Century Studios theatrical animated feature films
- List of Disney+ original films
- List of Hollywood Pictures films
- List of Hulu original films
- List of films released by Lucasfilm
- List of Marvel Studios films
- List of Star Studio18 films
- List of Searchlight Pictures films
- List of 20th Century Studios films
- List of Touchstone Pictures films
- List of Walt Disney Pictures films
- Lists of Walt Disney Studios films
- Category:Lists of films by studio
