= If These Walls Could Sing =

2022 British documentary film

- Directed by: Mary McCartney
- Produced by: John Battsek; Sarah Thomson; Miles Coleman
- Starring: John Williams; Paul McCartney; Elton John; Liam Gallagher; Roger Waters; David Gilmour; Jimmy Page; Noel Gallagher; Celeste; Nile Rodgers; Cliff Richard; Ringo Starr
- Music by: Toby Pitman
- Production companies: Disney Original Documentary; Mercury Studios; Ventureland
- Distributed by: Disney+
- Release dates: September 2022 (Telluride); 16 December 2022 (U.S.); 6 January 2023 (UK)
- Running time: 89 minutes
- Country: United Kingdom
- Language: English

If These Walls Could Sing is a 2022 British documentary film directed by Mary McCartney, in her feature documentary debut, about the history of Abbey Road Studios in London and the experiences and memories of the musicians who have played there. Produced by John Battsek, the documentary formed a centrepiece of Abbey Road Studios’ 90th anniversary celebrations in November 2022.

== Cast ==
- John Williams
- Paul McCartney
- Ringo Starr
- Elton John
- Jimmy Page
- Noel Gallagher
- Liam Gallagher
- Roger Waters
- David Gilmour
- Nick Mason
- Cliff Richard
- Celeste
- Giles Martin
- George Lucas
- Sheku Kanneh-Mason
- Tony Hicks
- Bobby Elliott
- Baba Ani
- Colette Barber
- Nile Rodgers
- Ashaine White
- Matilda Mann
- Naomi Kimpenu

== Production ==
It was announced in January 2021 that Mary McCartney was to direct a documentary about Abbey Road Studios. McCartney said, "some of my earliest memories as a young child come from time spent at Abbey Road, I’ve long wanted to tell the story of this historic place." As well as her father Paul McCartney, contributions are reported to be from Jimmy Page, Kate Bush, Noel Gallagher, Liam Gallagher, Pink Floyd, John Williams, Celeste, Elton John, Giles Martin, and Shirley Bassey. Production is by Mercury Studios and Ventureland. McCartney said what she "wanted from the interviews was to drill down into those musicians really feel about Abbey Road. 'Do you really care about Abbey Road? It's a building and you recorded here, but whatever. Do you really care?' And I think from the interviews, you can really see they are thinking fondly about it."

== Release ==
The film had its world premiere at the 49th Telluride Film Festival in September 2022. It was made available to stream on Disney+ in the United States on 16 December 2022 and on Hulu on 23 December 2022. It was released on Disney+ in the UK on 6 January 2023.

== Reception ==
=== Critical response ===
On the review aggregator website Rotten Tomatoes, 95% of 19 critics' reviews are positive, with an average rating of 6.70/10.

Peter Bradshaw of The Guardian gave If These Walls Could Sing a grade of 4 out of 5 stars, and described it as an "enjoyable" documentary and a "diverting private tour," emphasizing the studio use not only for pop and rock music but for Elgar, the cellist Jacqueline du Pré, the London Symphony Orchestra and film projects from John Williams, George Lucas and Steven Spielberg. Chris Harvey in The Daily Telegraph called the film "an astonishing line-up of interviewees" which provide an account "rich with details" and "a heart-stopping moment when George Martin's son Giles plays the original tapes of John Lennon's vocals for A Day in the Life." Peter Aspden of Financial Times stated that the movie is "charming" but not "hugely revealing… put together with visual flair, in a shamelessly nostalgic tone."
