= List of Walt Disney Studios films (1980–1989) =

This is a list of films produced and distributed by the American film studio Walt Disney Studios, one of the Walt Disney Company's divisions and one of the "Big Five" major film studios. The list includes films produced or released by all existing and defunct labels or subsidiaries of the Walt Disney Studios; including Walt Disney Pictures, Walt Disney Animation Studios, Pixar Animation Studios, Marvel Studios, Lucasfilm, 20th Century Studios, Searchlight Pictures, Blue Sky Studios, Disneynature, Touchstone Pictures, and Hollywood Pictures. The list does include films produced by studios that are now owned by Disney (as part of acquisitions), but were historically distributed by Disney during their original, initial time of release.

All films listed are theatrical releases by Buena Vista Pictures Distribution unless specified.

Release date	Title	Studio release label	Co-production with
February 8, 1980	Midnight Madness	Walt Disney Productions	
April 17, 1980	The Watcher in the Woods	Walt Disney Productions	
June 25, 1980	Herbie Goes Bananas	Walt Disney Productions	
June 25, 1980	The Last Flight of Noah's Ark	Walt Disney Productions	
March 6, 1981	The Devil and Max Devlin	Walt Disney Productions	
March 20, 1981	Amy	Walt Disney Productions	
July 10, 1981	The Fox and the Hound	Walt Disney Productions	
August 7, 1981	Condorman	Walt Disney Productions	
February 5, 1982	Night Crossing	Walt Disney Productions	
July 9, 1982	Tron	Walt Disney Productions	Lisberger-Kushner Productions
July 30, 1982	Tex	Walt Disney Productions	
March 11, 1983	Trenchcoat	Walt Disney Productions	
April 29, 1983	Something Wicked This Way Comes	Walt Disney Productions	The Bryna Company
October 7, 1983	Never Cry Wolf	Walt Disney Pictures	Amarok Productions Ltd.
November 4, 1983	Running Brave	Walt Disney Pictures	distribution only; produced by Englander Productions
March 9, 1984	Splash	Touchstone Films	
September 28, 1984	Country	Touchstone Films	Far West Productions and Pangaea Corporation
March 22, 1985	Baby: Secret of the Lost Legend	Touchstone Films	Silver Screen Partners II
June 21, 1985	Return to Oz	Walt Disney Pictures	Silver Screen Partners II
July 26, 1985	The Black Cauldron	Walt Disney Pictures	Walt Disney Productions and Silver Screen Partners II
August 9, 1985	My Science Project	Touchstone Films	Silver Screen Partners II
September 27, 1985	The Journey of Natty Gann	Walt Disney Pictures	Silver Screen Partners II
November 22, 1985	One Magic Christmas	Walt Disney Pictures	Silver Screen Partners II and Telefilm Canada
January 31, 1986	Down and Out in Beverly Hills	Touchstone Films	Silver Screen Partners II
April 11, 1986	Off Beat	Touchstone Films	Silver Screen Partners II
June 27, 1986	Ruthless People	Touchstone Films	Silver Screen Partners II
July 2, 1986	The Great Mouse Detective	Walt Disney Pictures	Walt Disney Feature Animation and Silver Screen Partners II
July 30, 1986	Flight of the Navigator	Walt Disney Pictures	Producers Sales Organization and New Star Entertainment
October 3, 1986	Tough Guys	Touchstone Pictures	Silver Screen Partners II and The Bryna Company
October 8, 1986	The Color of Money	Touchstone Pictures	Silver Screen Partners II
January 30, 1987	Outrageous Fortune	Touchstone Pictures	Silver Screen Partners II and Interscope Communications
March 6, 1987	Tin Men	Touchstone Pictures	Silver Screen Partners II and Interscope Communications
May 22, 1987	Ernest Goes to Camp	Touchstone Pictures	Silver Screen Partners II and Emshell Producers Group
June 17, 1987	Benji the Hunted	Walt Disney Pictures	Silver Screen Partners III
July 1, 1987	Adventures in Babysitting	Touchstone Pictures	Rose Productions and Silver Screen Partners III
August 5, 1987	Stakeout	Touchstone Pictures	Silver Screen Partners II
August 14, 1987	Can't Buy Me Love	Touchstone Pictures	Silver Screen Partners III, Apollo Pictures and The Mount Company
November 6, 1987	Hello Again	Touchstone Pictures	Silver Screen Partners III
November 25, 1987	Three Men and a Baby	Touchstone Pictures	Silver Screen Partners III and Interscope Communications
December 25, 1987	Good Morning, Vietnam	Touchstone Pictures	Silver Screen Partners III
February 12, 1988	Shoot to Kill	Touchstone Pictures	Silver Screen Partners III and Century Park Pictures
March 18, 1988	D.O.A.	Touchstone Pictures	Silver Screen Partners III
April 15, 1988	Return to Snowy River	Walt Disney Pictures	Silver Screen Partners III, Burrowes Film Group and The Hoyts Group
June 10, 1988	Big Business	Touchstone Pictures	Silver Screen Partners III
June 22, 1988	Who Framed Roger Rabbit	Touchstone Pictures	Amblin Entertainment and Silver Screen Partners III
July 29, 1988	Cocktail	Touchstone Pictures	Silver Screen Partners III and Interscope Communications
August 5, 1988	The Rescue	Touchstone Pictures	Silver Screen Partners III
September 30, 1988	Heartbreak Hotel	Touchstone Pictures	Silver Screen Partners III
November 4, 1988	The Good Mother	Touchstone Pictures	Silver Screen Partners III
November 11, 1988	Ernest Saves Christmas	Touchstone Pictures	Silver Screen Partners III and Emshell Producers Group
November 18, 1988	Oliver & Company	Walt Disney Pictures	Walt Disney Feature Animation and Silver Screen Partners III
December 21, 1988	Beaches	Touchstone Pictures	Silver Screen Partners IV and All Girl Productions
January 27, 1989	Three Fugitives	Touchstone Pictures	Silver Screen Partners IV
March 10, 1989	New York Stories	Touchstone Pictures	Silver Screen Partners IV and American Zoetrope (Life Without Zoë)
April 14, 1989	Disorganized Crime	Touchstone Pictures	Silver Screen Partners IV and Kouf/Bigelow Productions
June 9, 1989	Dead Poets Society	Touchstone Pictures	Silver Screen Partners IV
June 23, 1989	Honey, I Shrunk the Kids	Walt Disney Pictures	Silver Screen Partners III
July 28, 1989	Turner & Hooch	Touchstone Pictures	Silver Screen Partners IV and All Girl Productions
August 18, 1989	Cheetah	Walt Disney Pictures	Silver Screen Partners III
October 6, 1989	An Innocent Man	Touchstone Pictures	Interscope Communications
October 20, 1989	Gross Anatomy	Touchstone Pictures	Silver Screen Partners IV, Sandollar Productions and Hill/Roseman
November 17, 1989	The Little Mermaid	Walt Disney Pictures	Walt Disney Feature Animation and Silver Screen Partners IV
December 13, 1989	Blaze	Touchstone Pictures	Silver Screen Partners IV and A&M Films

== See also ==
- Walt Disney Home Video (VHS)
- List of Disney feature-length home entertainment releases
- List of Disney television films
- List of Disney+ original films
- List of Hollywood Pictures films
- List of films released by Lucasfilm
- List of Marvel Studios films
- List of Searchlight Pictures films
- List of 20th Century Studios films
- List of Touchstone Pictures films
- List of Walt Disney Pictures films
- Category:Lists of films by studio
