= Disney Original Documentary =

Documentary arm of Disney Kids & Family

- Type: Subsidiary
- Founded: December 9, 2021; 4 years ago
- Founder: Ayo Davis
- Headquarters: Walt Disney Studios Lot, Burbank, California
- Parent: Disney Kids & Family

Disney Original Documentary is the documentary production & distribution label of Disney Kids & Family which is part of Disney Entertainment Television that handles the distribution & production of documentaries produced or acquired mainly for Disney's own streaming services Disney+ alongside releasing them for theatrical distribution.

Walt Disney Studios Motion Pictures distributes some of documentary films produced by Disney Original Documentary for limited theatrical releases, while for the theatrical films outside of USA, were made by Walt Disney Studios Motion Pictures International through their Buena Vista International label.

== History ==
On December 9, 2021, Disney Kids & Family had established its own documentary production division that is dedicated to producing and acquiring documentaries based at the parent's location Burbank, California named Disney Original Documentary with the newly production unit acquired the acclaimed documentary short Sophie & The Baron as its first documentary production with Disney Branded Television president being served as CEO of the newly established documentary unit.

== Filmography ==
All films listed are theatrical releases unless specified:

- Films labeled with a ‡ symbol signifies a release exclusively through Disney+ or its sister services and content hubs.

Release date	Title	Notes
August 5, 2022	Mija	co-production with Tertulia Pictures
November 18, 2022	Mickey: The Story of a Mouse ‡	co-production with Tremolo Productions; distributed by Disney+
December 16, 2022	If These Walls Could Sing ‡	co-production with Mercury Studios; distributed by Disney+
March 29, 2024	Madu ‡	co-production with Hunting Lane Films; distributed by Disney+
May 31, 2024	Jim Henson Idea Man ‡	co-production with Imagine Documentaries, Fifth Season and Diamond Docs; distributed by Disney+
November 15, 2024	Elton John: Never Too Late	limited theatrical release; co-production with Rocket Pictures and This Machine Filmworks
