= List of Walt Disney Studios films (1937–1959) =

This is a list of films produced and distributed by the American film studio Walt Disney Studios, one of the Walt Disney Company's divisions and one of the "Big Five" major film studios. The list includes films produced or released by all existing and defunct labels or subsidiaries of the Walt Disney Studios; including Walt Disney Pictures, Walt Disney Animation Studios, Pixar Animation Studios, Marvel Studios, Lucasfilm, 20th Century Studios, Searchlight Pictures, Blue Sky Studios, Disneynature, Touchstone Pictures, and Hollywood Pictures. The list does not include films produced by studios that are now owned by Disney (as part of acquisitions), but were historically not distributed by Disney during their original, initial time of release.

All films listed are theatrical releases by Buena Vista Film Distribution Company, Inc. unless specified.

== 1930s ==
Release date	Title	Studio	Notes
December 21, 1937	Snow White and the Seven Dwarfs	Walt Disney Productions; distributed by RKO Radio Pictures	Walt Disney Studios' first feature-length film Academy Honorary Award

== 1940s ==
Release date	Title	Studio
February 7, 1940	Pinocchio	Walt Disney Productions; distributed by RKO Radio Pictures
November 13, 1940	Fantasia	Walt Disney Productions; distributed by RKO Radio Pictures
June 20, 1941	The Reluctant Dragon	Walt Disney Productions; distributed by RKO Radio Pictures
October 23, 1941	Dumbo	Walt Disney Productions; distributed by RKO Radio Pictures
August 13, 1942	Bambi	Walt Disney Productions; distributed by RKO Radio Pictures
February 6, 1943	Saludos Amigos	Walt Disney Productions; distributed by RKO Radio Pictures
July 17, 1943	Victory Through Air Power	Walt Disney Productions; distributed by United Artists
February 3, 1945	The Three Caballeros	Walt Disney Productions; distributed by RKO Radio Pictures
April 20, 1946	Make Mine Music	Walt Disney Productions; distributed by RKO Radio Pictures
November 12, 1946	Song of the South	Walt Disney Productions; distributed by RKO Radio Pictures
September 27, 1947	Fun and Fancy Free	Walt Disney Productions; distributed by RKO Radio Pictures
May 27, 1948	Melody Time	Walt Disney Productions; distributed by RKO Radio Pictures
November 29, 1948	So Dear to My Heart	Walt Disney Productions; distributed by RKO Radio Pictures
October 5, 1949	The Adventures of Ichabod and Mr. Toad	Walt Disney Productions; distributed by RKO Radio Pictures

== 1950s ==
Release date	Title	Studio
February 15, 1950	Cinderella	Walt Disney Productions; distributed by RKO Radio Pictures
July 29, 1950	Treasure Island	Walt Disney Productions; distributed by RKO Radio Pictures
July 28, 1951	Alice in Wonderland	Walt Disney Productions; distributed by RKO Radio Pictures
June 26, 1952	The Story of Robin Hood and His Merrie Men	Walt Disney Productions; distributed by RKO Radio Pictures
February 5, 1953	Peter Pan	Walt Disney Productions; distributed by RKO Radio Pictures
July 23, 1953	The Sword and the Rose	Walt Disney Productions; distributed by RKO Radio Pictures
November 10, 1953	The Living Desert	Walt Disney Productions
February 27, 1954	Rob Roy: The Highland Rogue	Walt Disney Productions; distributed by RKO Radio Pictures
August 16, 1954	The Vanishing Prairie	Walt Disney Productions
December 23, 1954	20,000 Leagues Under the Sea	Walt Disney Productions
May 25, 1955	Davy Crockett, King of the Wild Frontier (Compilation film)	Walt Disney Productions
June 22, 1955	Lady and the Tramp	Walt Disney Productions
September 14, 1955	The African Lion	Walt Disney Productions
December 22, 1955	The Littlest Outlaw	Walt Disney Productions
June 8, 1956	The Great Locomotive Chase	Walt Disney Productions
July 18, 1956	Davy Crockett and the River Pirates (Compilation film)	Walt Disney Productions
September 10, 1956	Princess Yang Kwei Fei	Daiei Studio; Distribution only
November 6, 1956	Secrets of Life	Walt Disney Productions
December 20, 1956	Westward Ho the Wagons!	Walt Disney Productions
April 22, 1957	If All the Guys in the World	Les Films Ariane; Distribution only
June 19, 1957	Johnny Tremain	Walt Disney Productions
August 28, 1957	Perri	Walt Disney Productions
December 25, 1957	Old Yeller	Walt Disney Productions
January 21, 1958	The Missouri Traveler	C.V. Whitney Pictures; Distribution only
January 29, 1958	The Story of Vickie	Erma-Film and Sie Verling; Distribution only
March 6, 1958	Stage Struck	RKO Radio Pictures; Distribution only
May 28, 1958	The Proud Rebel	Samuel Goldwyn Productions; Distribution only
July 8, 1958	The Light in the Forest	Walt Disney Productions
August 12, 1958	White Wilderness	Walt Disney Productions
December 25, 1958	Tonka	Walt Disney Productions
January 29, 1959	Sleeping Beauty	Walt Disney Productions
March 19, 1959	The Shaggy Dog	Walt Disney Productions
June 26, 1959	Darby O'Gill and the Little People	Walt Disney Productions
August 4, 1959	The Big Fisherman	Centurion Films, Inc. and Rowland V. Lee Production; Distribution only
September 10, 1959	Zorro the Avenger (Compilation film)	Walt Disney Productions
November 10, 1959	Third Man on the Mountain	Walt Disney Productions

== See also ==
- List of Disney feature-length home entertainment releases
- List of Disney television films
- List of Disney+ original films
- List of Hollywood Pictures films
- List of films released by Lucasfilm
- List of Marvel Studios films
- List of Searchlight Pictures films
- List of 20th Century Studios films
- List of Touchstone Pictures films
- List of Walt Disney Pictures films
- Category:Lists of films by studio
