= List of Fox Searchlight Pictures films (2000–2009) =

This is a list of films produced by Fox Searchlight Pictures (now Searchlight Pictures) beginning in 2000 up until 2009.

== 2000 ==
Release date	Title	Notes
February 25, 2000	The Closer You Get	co-production with Redwave Films
March 17, 2000	Soft Fruit	distribution in North America, the U.K., Ireland, Australia, New Zealand and South Africa only
September 2, 2000	Chinese Coffee	distribution only; produced by Chal Productions and Shooting Gallery
September 22, 2000	Woman on Top	—
October 6, 2000	Bootmen	Australian film
November 22, 2000	Quills	co-production with Industry Entertainment and Walrus & Associates; Nominated - Critics' Choice Movie Award for Best Picture

== 2001 ==
Release date	Title	Notes
April 11, 2001	Kingdom Come	co-production with Bates Entertainment and the Turman-Morrissey Company
June 15, 2001	Sexy Beast	distribution in North and Latin America, Spain, South Africa, Turkey, Australia and New Zealand only; produced by FilmFour, Kanzaman S.A. and Recorded Picture Company; BIFA for Best British Independent Film; Nominated - BAFTA Award for Best British Film; Nominated - Independent Spirit Award for Best International Film
August 8, 2001	The Deep End	distribution outside France and Italy only Nominated - Grand Jury Prize Dramatic
October 19, 2001	Waking Life	distribution only; produced by the Independent Film Channel Productions, Thousand Words and Detour Filmproduction; Nominated - Critics' Choice Movie Award for Best Animated Feature; Nominated - Golden Lion; Nominated - Independent Spirit Award for Best Film

== 2002 ==
Release date	Title	Notes
February 15, 2002	Super Troopers	distribution only; produced by Jersey Shore, Cataland Films and Broken Lizard Films
March 13, 2002	Kissing Jessica Stein	distribution only; produced by Brad Zions Films, Eden Wurmfeld Films, Cineric and Michael Alden Productions; GLAAD Media Award for Outstanding Film - Limited Release
August 7, 2002	The Good Girl	distribution in North and Latin America, the U.K., Ireland, Australasia and South Africa only; produced by Myriad Pictures, Hungry Eye Lowland Pictures and Flan de Coco Films; Nominated - Independent Spirit Award for Best Film
August 21, 2002	One Hour Photo	co-production with Catch 23 Productions, Killer Films and John Wells Productions; Nominated - Grand Jury Prize Dramatic
September 20, 2002	The Banger Sisters	co-production with Gran Via Productions
October 11, 2002	Brown Sugar	co-production with Heller Highwater and Magic Johnson Productions
December 19, 2002	Antwone Fisher	—

== 2003 ==
Release date	Title	Notes
March 12, 2003	Bend It Like Beckham	North and South American distribution only; produced by Kintop Pictures, UK Film Council, Bend It Films, Roc Media and Road Movies Filmproduktion; GLAAD Media Award for Outstanding Film - Wide Release; Nominated - BAFTA Award for Outstanding British Film; Nominated - BIFA for Best British Independent Film; Nominated - European Film Award for Best Film; Nominated - Golden Globe Award for Best Motion Picture - Musical or Comedy
April 4, 2003	The Good Thief	U.S., South African, Australian, New Zealand and Japanese distribution only; produced by Alliance Atlantis
May 2, 2003	The Dancer Upstairs	distribution in North America, the U.K., Ireland, Australia, New Zealand, South Africa, France and Italy only; produced by Lolafilms, Mr. Mudd, Antena 3 Televisión and Vía Digital
May 16, 2003	L'Auberge espagnole	distribution in the U.S., Latin America, Scandinavia, Australia, New Zealand and Asia only; produced by Ce qui me meut, StudioCanal, France 2 Cinéma, BAC Films, Mate Productions and Castelao Producciones; Nominated - César Award for Best Film
June 27, 2003	28 Days Later (Note: Distribution rights currently owned by Sony Pictures (under Columbia Pictures), although Searchlight Pictures retains its credits as presenter)	British film; distribution only; produced by DNA Films and UK Film Council; Nominated - BIFA for Best British Independent Film
July 18, 2003	Garage Days	Australian film
July 25, 2003	Lucía, Lucía	distribution in North and Latin America excluding Mexico, Australia, New Zealand, France and select territories in the Middle East and Asia including Japan only
August 8, 2003	Le Divorce	co-production with Merchant Ivory Productions and Radar Pictures
August 20, 2003	Thirteen	distribution outside the U.K. and Ireland only; produced by Michael London Productions, Working Title Films and Antidote Films; distributed in the U.K. and Ireland by Universal Pictures; Nominated - Grand Jury Prize Dramatic
November 26, 2003	In America	co-production with Hell's Kitchen Films; Nominated - Critics' Choice Movie Award for Best Picture; Nominated - Independent Spirit Award for Best Film

== 2004 ==
Release date	Title	Notes
February 6, 2004	The Dreamers (Note: International rights owned by HanWay Films, with U.K. distribution currently handled by Icon Film Distribution)	distribution in North and Latin America, the U.K., Ireland, Australia, New Zealand and South Africa only; produced by Recorded Picture Company, Fiction Cinematografica and Peninsula Films
February 27, 2004	Club Dread	co-production with Cataland Films and Broken Lizard Films
March 26, 2004	Never Die Alone	distribution only; produced by ContentFilm, Bloodline Films, White Orchid Films and Fearon Entertainment
April 7, 2004	Johnson Family Vacation	co-production with Hallway Pictures and A Bird and a Bear Entertainment
June 11, 2004	Napoleon Dynamite	distribution in North and Latin America, Italy, Switzerland, Turkey and Japan only; produced by Napoleon Pictures and Access Films; distributed internationally by Paramount Pictures and MTV Films; Nominated - Grand Jury Prize Dramatic
July 2, 2004	The Clearing	co-production with Thousand Words and Wildwood Enterprises
July 28, 2004	Garden State	distribution in North America, Eastern Europe, the CIS, the Middle East, Israel and Asia only; co-acquisition with Miramax Films; produced by Camelot Pictures, Jersey Films and Double Feature Films; Nominated - Grand Jury Prize Dramatic
October 1, 2004	I Heart Huckabees	distribution in North and Latin America, the U.K., Ireland, Australia, New Zealand, South Africa, France, Italy, Germany, Austria, Switzerland, Spain and Asia excluding Japan only; co-production with Qwerty Films, Kanzeon and Scott Rudin Productions
October 22, 2004	Sideways	co-production with Michael London Productions; Critics' Choice Movie Award for Best Picture; Golden Globe Award for Best Motion Picture - Musical or Comedy; Gotham Independent Film Award for Best Feature; Independent Spirit Award for Best Film; Nominated - Academy Award for Best Picture; Nominated - Producers Guild of America Award for Best Theatrical Motion Picture
November 12, 2004	Kinsey	distribution in North and Latin America, the U.K., Ireland, Australia, New Zealand, South Africa, Germany, Austria, Switzerland and Italy only; co-production with Qwerty Films, American Zoetrope and Pretty Pictures; Nominated - Critics' Choice Movie Award for Best Picture; Nominated - Golden Globe Award for Best Motion Picture - Drama; Nominated - Independent Spirit Award for Best Film

== 2005 ==
Release date	Title	Notes
March 18, 2005	Melinda and Melinda	co-production with Gravier Productions
April 29, 2005	Millions	distribution in North America, Germany, Austria, Spain, Australia and New Zealand only; produced by Pathé Pictures, UK Film Council, BBC Films, Mission Pictures and Inside Track 2
September 16, 2005	Separate Lies	British film; distribution only; produced by Celador Films, DNA Films, UK Film Council and FilmFour
September 23, 2005	Roll Bounce	distribution only; produced by Fox 2000 Pictures and State Street Pictures
November 11, 2005	Bee Season	distribution in all media excluding international television outside Italy, Germany, Austria and Switzerland only; co-production with Regency Enterprises and Bona Fide Productions
December 23, 2005	The Ringer	co-production with Conundrum Entertainment

== 2006 ==
Release date	Title	Notes
January 27, 2006	Imagine Me & You	distribution in North and Latin America, France, Italy and Japan only; produced by BBC Films, Cougar Films, Fragile Films and X Filme Creative Pool
February 17, 2006	Night Watch	distribution outside the CIS and the Baltics only; produced by Channel One Russia, Tabbak and Bazelevs Company
March 10, 2006	The Hills Have Eyes	co-production with Craven/Maddalena Films
March 17, 2006	Thank You for Smoking	distribution outside France, the Benelux, Switzerland, Italy, Scandinavia, Portugal, Eastern Europe, the Baltics and the CIS only; produced by Room 9 Entertainment and ContentFilm; Nominated - Critics' Choice Movie Award for Best Comedy; Nominated - Golden Globe Award for Best Motion Picture - Musical or Comedy
April 7, 2006	Phat Girlz	distribution only; produced by Outlaw Productions, Sneak Preview Entertainment and 10 Times Greater Productions
April 28, 2006	Water	U.S. distribution only Nominated - Academy Award for Best Foreign Language Film; Nominated - Critics' Choice Movie Award for Best Foreign Language Film; Nominated - Genie Award for Best Motion Picture
July 26, 2006	Little Miss Sunshine	distribution only; produced by Big Beach Films, Bona Fide Productions and Third Gear Productions; César Award for Best Foreign Film; Independent Spirit Award for Best Film; Producers Guild of America Award for Best Theatrical Motion Picture; Nominated - Academy Award for Best Picture; Nominated - BAFTA Award for Best Film; Nominated - Critics' Choice Movie Award for Best Picture; Nominated - Golden Globe Award for Best Motion Picture - Musical or Comedy
August 18, 2006	Trust the Man	distribution in North America, Mexico, Argentina, Paraguay, Uruguay, Chile, Colombia, France, the Benelux, Switzerland, China, Hong Kong, India, Japan, Korea and Taiwan only; produced by Sidney Kimmel Entertainment
September 22, 2006	Confetti	British film; distribution only; produced by BBC Films and Wasted Talent
September 27, 2006	The Last King of Scotland	distribution only; produced by DNA Films, FilmFour, Cowboy Films and Slate Films; BAFTA Award for Best British Film; Nominated - BAFTA Award for Best Film; Nominated - European Film Award for Best Film
November 17, 2006	Fast Food Nation	North American distribution only; produced by Participant Productions, BBC Films and Recorded Picture Company
December 22, 2006	The History Boys	British film; distribution only; produced by DNA Films, BBC Films, and UK Film Council
December 25, 2006	Notes on a Scandal	British film; distribution only; produced by DNA Films, UK Film Council, BBC Films and Scott Rudin Productions; Nominated - BAFTA Award for Best British Film; Nominated - BIFA for Best British Independent Film; Nominated - Critics' Choice Movie Award for Best Picture

== 2007 ==
Release date	Title	Notes
March 9, 2007	The Namesake (Note: Disney now owns worldwide rights to this film, having acquired the UTV catalog in 2013 and the Fox Searchlight library in 2019)	distribution outside India only; co-production with Entertainment Farm, UTV Motion Pictures, Mirabai Films and Cine Mosaic
March 16, 2007	I Think I Love My Wife	distribution outside India only; co-production with UTV Motion Pictures and Zahrlo Productions
May 16, 2007	Once	North American distribution only; produced by Samson Films; Independent Spirit Award for Best International Film; Nominated - BIFA for Best Foreign Independent Film
May 2, 2007	Waitress	distribution only; produced by Night & Day Pictures
June 1, 2007	Day Watch	distribution outside the CIS and the Baltics only; produced by Channel One Russia, Tabbak and the Bazelevs Company
July 6, 2007	Joshua	distribution outside Canada only; produced by ATO Pictures
July 27, 2007	Sunshine	British film; co-production with DNA Films
October 26, 2007	The Darjeeling Limited	distribution only; produced by Collage Cinemagraphique, Indian Paintbrush, American Empirical Pictures and Scott Rudin Productions
November 28, 2007	The Savages	co-production with Lone Star Film Group, This is that, Ad Hominem Enterprises and Cooper's Town Productions
December 5, 2007	Juno	distribution outside Latin America, Portugal, Eastern Europe, the Baltics, the CIS, the Middle East, Iceland, Turkey and Asia excluding Japan only; produced by Mandate Pictures and Mr. Mudd; Critics' Choice Movie Award for Best Comedy; Independent Spirit Award for Best Film; Nominated - Academy Award for Best Picture; Nominated - Golden Globe Award for Best Motion Picture - Musical or Comedy; Nominated - Producers Guild of America Award for Best Theatrical Motion Picture

== 2008 ==
Release date	Title	Notes
March 19, 2008	La Misma Luna (Under the Same Moon)	North and Latin American distribution only; co-acquisition with the Weinstein Company; produced by Potomac Pictures, Crenado Films and Fidecine
April 9, 2008	Young@Heart	North American distribution only
April 11, 2008	Street Kings	distribution in all media excluding international television only; co-production with Regency Enterprises and 3 Arts Entertainment
September 26, 2008	Choke	distribution outside Canada, Germany, Austria, the Nordics, Romania, the Baltics, Turkey, Portugal and the CIS only; produced by ATO Pictures and Contrafilm
October 17, 2008	The Secret Life of Bees	co-production with Overbrook Entertainment and the Donners' Company
November 12, 2008	Slumdog Millionaire	North American and Chinese co-distribution with Warner Bros. Pictures only; produced by Celador Films and Film4; Academy Award for Best Picture; BAFTA Award for Best Film; BIFA for Best British Independent Film; Critics' Choice Movie Award for Best Picture; European Film Award for Best Film; Golden Globe Award for Best Motion Picture - Drama; National Board of Review Award for Best Film; Producers Guild of America Award for Best Theatrical Motion Picture; Toronto International Film Festival People's Choice Award; Nominated - BAFTA Award for Best British Film
December 17, 2008	The Wrestler	U.S. distribution only; produced by Wild Bunch and Protozoa Pictures; Golden Lion; Independent Spirit Award for Best Film; Nominated - Critics' Choice Movie Award for Best Picture

== 2009 ==
Release date	Title	Notes
January 16, 2009	Notorious	co-production with Voletta Wallace Films, By Storm Films, State Street Films and Bad Boy Films
March 13, 2009	Miss March	co-production with the Jacobson Company and Alta Loma Entertainment; originally produced under Fox Atomic
June 5, 2009	My Life in Ruins	North American, French, Australian and New Zealand distribution only; produced by 26 Films and Kanzaman Productions
July 17, 2009	(500) Days of Summer	co-production with Watermark Productions; Nominated - Critics' Choice Movie Award for Best Comedy; Nominated - Golden Globe Award for Best Motion Picture - Musical or Comedy; Nominated - Independent Spirit Award for Best Film
July 29, 2009	Adam	distribution only; produced by Olympus Pictures, Serenade Films, Deer Path Productions and Vox3 Films
October 2, 2009	Whip It	North American distribution only; produced by Mandate Pictures, Vincent Pictures, Flower Films and Rye Road
October 23, 2009	Amelia	distribution only; produced by Avalon Pictures
October 30, 2009	Gentlemen Broncos	co-production with Rip Cord
December 16, 2009	Crazy Heart	distribution only; produced by Informant Media and Butcher's Run Films
