= List of Searchlight Pictures films =

Searchlight Pictures logo wordmark

This is a list of films produced and released by American film studio Searchlight Pictures since 2020.

All films listed are theatrical releases unless specified. Films labeled with a ‡ symbol signify a streaming release exclusively through Hulu, Disney+, or Star+.

== Released ==
Release date	Title	Notes
February 14, 2020	Downhill	co-production with Filmhaus Films and Likely Story; first feature film released under the Searchlight Pictures name
February 28, 2020	Wendy	distribution in North and South America, Germany, Austria, Switzerland, Italy, South Africa, Poland, China, Hong Kong and worldwide airlines only; co-production with Department of Motion Pictures and Journeyman Pictures
August 28, 2020	The Personal History of David Copperfield	North American distribution only; produced by FilmNation Entertainment and Film4; Nominated - BIFA for Best British Independent Film
February 19, 2021	Nomadland	distribution only; produced by Highwayman Films, Hear/Say Productions and Cor Cordium Productions; Academy Award for Best Picture; BAFTA Award for Best Film; Critics' Choice Movie Award for Best Picture; Golden Globe Award for Best Motion Picture - Drama; Golden Lion; Producers Guild of America Award for Best Theatrical Motion Picture
May 3, 2021	The Heart Still Hums	distribution only; produced by Doomsday Entertainment and Park Pictures
June 7, 2021	Workshop	distribution only; produced by the New Zealand Film Commission and Toi Whakaari
June 25, 2021	Summer of Soul (...Or, When the Revolution Could Not Be Televised)	distribution only; produced by Onyx Collective, RadicalMedia, Mass Distraction Media, Vulcan Productions, Concordia Studio, Play/Action Pictures and LarryBilly Productions; co-distributed with Hulu on July 2, 2021; Academy Award for Best Documentary Feature; BAFTA Award for Best Documentary; Grammy Award for Best Music Film; Grand Jury Prize Documentary; Producers Guild of America Award for Best Documentary Motion Picture
August 20, 2021	The Night House	distribution only; produced by Anton and Phantom Four Films
September 17, 2021	The Eyes of Tammy Faye	co-production with Freckle Films, MWM Studios and Semi-Formal Productions
October 22, 2021	The French Dispatch	distribution only; produced by Indian Paintbrush and American Empirical Pictures; Nominated - Critics' Choice Movie Award for Best Comedy
October 29, 2021	Antlers	co-production with Phantom Four and Double Dare You Productions
December 7, 2021	Wiggle Room	distribution only; produced by Anarene, Simone Films and Smog Cinema Group
December 17, 2021	Nightmare Alley	co-production with Double Dare You Productions; Nominated - Academy Award for Best Picture; Nominated - Critics' Choice Movie Award for Best Picture
February 7, 2022	Plaisir	distribution only; produced by the Tisch School of Arts
March 4, 2022	Fresh ‡	distribution only; produced by Hyperobject Industries and Legendary Entertainment; distributed by Hulu in the United States, Star+ in Latin America, and Disney+ internationally Nominated - Critics' Choice Television Award for Best Movie Made for Television
June 3, 2022	Fire Island ‡	co-production with Jax Media; distributed by Hulu in the United States, Star+ in Latin America, and Disney+ internationally GLAAD Media Award for Outstanding Film - Streaming or TV; Nominated - Primetime Emmy Award for Outstanding Television Movie; Nominated - Producers Guild of America Award for Best Streamed or Televised Movie
June 17, 2022	Good Luck to You, Leo Grande ‡	U.S. distribution only; produced by Genesius Pictures and Align; distributed by Hulu; Nominated - BAFTA Award for Outstanding British Film; Nominated - BIFA for Best British Independent Film
July 29, 2022	Not Okay ‡	co-production with Makeready; distributed by Hulu in the United States, Star+ in Latin America, and Disney+ internationally
September 16, 2022	See How They Run	co-production with DJ Films; Nominated - BAFTA Award for Outstanding British Film
October 21, 2022	The Banshees of Inisherin	co-production with Blueprint Pictures and Film4; BAFTA Award for Outstanding British Film; Golden Globe Award for Best Motion Picture - Musical or Comedy; Nominated - Academy Award for Best Picture; Nominated - BAFTA Award for Best Film; Nominated - Critics' Choice Movie Award for Best Comedy; Nominated - Critics' Choice Movie Award for Best Picture; Nominated - Golden Lion; Nominated - Producers Guild of America Award for Best Theatrical Motion Picture
November 18, 2022	The Menu	co-production with Hyperobject Industries
December 9, 2022	Empire of Light	co-production with Neal Street Productions; Nominated - BAFTA Award for Outstanding British Film
March 31, 2023	Rye Lane	co-production with BBC Film, BFI, DJ Films and Turnover Films; distributed by Hulu in the United States, Star+ in Latin America, and Disney+ internationally Nominated - BAFTA Award for Outstanding British Film; Nominated - BIFA for Best British Independent Film
April 12, 2023	Starfuckers	distribution only; produced by Field Trip
April 20, 2023	Quasi ‡	co-production with Broken Lizard Industries; distributed by Hulu in the United States, Star+ in Latin America, and Disney+ internationally
April 21, 2023	Chevalier	co-production with Element Pictures
June 9, 2023	Flamin' Hot ‡	co-production with Franklin Entertainment; distributed by Hulu and Disney+ in the United States
July 14, 2023	Theater Camp	distribution only; produced by Topic Studios, Picturestart and Gloria Sanchez Productions; Nominated - Grand Jury Prize Dramatic
November 8, 2023	The Last Repair Shop	co-distribution with L.A. Times Studios only; produced by Breakwater Studios; Academy Award for Best Documentary Short Film; Critics' Choice Documentary Award for Best Short Documentary
November 17, 2023	Next Goal Wins	co-production with Imaginarium Productions
December 8, 2023	Poor Things	co-production with Element Pictures, Film4, Limp and Fruit Tree; Golden Globe Award for Best Motion Picture - Musical or Comedy; Golden Lion; Nominated - Academy Award for Best Picture; Nominated - BAFTA Award for Best Film; Nominated - BAFTA Award for Outstanding British Film; Nominated - Critics' Choice Movie Award for Best Comedy; Nominated - Critics' Choice Movie Award for Best Picture; Nominated - Producers Guild of America Award for Best Theatrical Motion Picture
December 22, 2023	All of Us Strangers	co-production with Blueprint Pictures and Film4; BIFA for Best British Independent Film; Nominated - BAFTA Award for Outstanding British Film; Nominated - GLAAD Media Award for Outstanding Film - Wide Release; Nominated - Independent Spirit Award for Best Feature
February 2, 2024	Suncoast ‡	co-production with Freestyle Picture Company, Seven Deuce Entertainment and 3 Arts Entertainment; co-distributed with Hulu in the United States, Star+ in Latin America, and Disney+ internationally on February 9, 2024; Nominated - Grand Jury Prize Dramatic
April 5, 2024	The Greatest Hits ‡	co-production with Groundswell Productions and Flying Point; co-distributed with Hulu in the United States, Star+ in Latin America, and Disney+ internationally on April 12, 2024
June 21, 2024	Kinds of Kindness	co-production with Element Pictures and Film4; Nominated - Palme d'Or
August 23, 2024	The Supremes at Earl's All-You-Can-Eat ‡	co-production with Temple Hill Entertainment
October 3, 2024	Hold Your Breath ‡	co-production with Mad Dog Films and Secret Engine; distributed by Hulu in the United States, and Disney+ internationally
November 1, 2024	A Real Pain	distribution only; produced by Topic Studios, Fruit Tree, Extreme Emotions and Rego Park; Critics' Choice Movie Award for Best Comedy (tied with Deadpool & Wolverine); Nominated - Golden Globe Award for Best Motion Picture - Musical or Comedy; Nominated - Grand Jury Prize Dramatic; Nominated - Producers Guild of America Award for Best Theatrical Motion Picture
December 6, 2024	Nightbitch	co-production with Archer Gray, Annapurna Pictures and Defiant by Nature
December 25, 2024	A Complete Unknown	co-production with The Picture Company, White Water, Range Media Partners, Turnpike Films and Veritas Entertainment Group; Nominated - Academy Award for Best Picture; Nominated - BAFTA Award for Best Film; Nominated - Critics' Choice Movie Award for Best Picture; Nominated - Golden Globe Award for Best Motion Picture - Drama; Nominated - Producers Guild of America Award for Best Theatrical Motion Picture
March 20, 2025	O'Dessa ‡	co-production with RT Features and Department of Motion Pictures; distributed by Hulu in the United States and Disney+ internationally; final film to be released under the Star hub outside of the United States.
August 29, 2025	The Roses	co-production with South of the River Pictures and SunnyMarch
November 21, 2025	Rental Family	co-production with Sight Unseen
December 19, 2025	Is This Thing On?	co-production with Lea Pictures and Archery Pictures
December 25, 2025	The Testament of Ann Lee	North American and select international distribution only; produced by Annapurna Pictures, Mid March Media, FirstGen Content, Mizzel Media, Yintai Entertainment, Kaplan Morrison and Intake Films; Nominated - Golden Lion
February 27, 2026	In the Blink of an Eye ‡	co-production with Mighty Engine; distributed by Hulu in the United States
March 20, 2026	Ready or Not 2: Here I Come	co-production with Project X Entertainment, Vinson Films and Radio Silence Productions
August 7, 2026	Super Troopers 3	co-production with Broken Lizard
November 6, 2026	Wild Horse Nine	co-production with Film4 and Blueprint Pictures; Nominated - Golden Lion

== Upcoming ==
Release date	Title	Notes	status
December 4, 2026	Behemoth!		Completed
April 16, 2027	Monitor	U.S., U.K., Irish and Southeast Asian distribution only; produced by Temple Hill Entertainment and Nostromo Pictures	Completed
November 19, 2027	The Families Stone	co-production with Groundswell Productions and Pretty Matches Productions	Filming

=== Undated films ===
Release date	Title	Notes	Status
2027	Sweetsick	co-production with Film4, House Productions and Dirty Films	Post-production
TBA	DNA	co-production with Party Over Here	Pre-production
TBA	Grand Rising	co-production with 12:01 Films, Grey Skies Pictures and Hillman Grad	Pre-production
TBA	Horrorstör	co-production with New Republic Pictures, Megamix and Aperture Entertainment	Pre-production
TBA	Lunik Heist	co-production with Gran Via Productions and Paradox	Pre-production
TBA	Playmates	co-production with High Frequency Entertainment	Filming
TBA	Somewhere Out There	distribution outside the Nordics only; produced by Scanbox Production	Post-production
TBA	Untitled Hirokazu Kore-eda film		Pre-production

=== In development ===
Title	Notes
Again Again Again	co-production with Local Time and Daniele Tate Media
Anita de Monte Laughs Last	co-production with Hyphenate Media Group
Anomaly	co-production with Anonymous Content
Bad Hand	co-production with Brownstone Productions
Barn 8	co-production with Gotham Group and Waititi Productions
Clean Break	co-production with Scott Free Productions
Desperation	co-production with Ghost House Pictures
The Eyes Are the Best Part	co-production with Jackson Pictures and Local Time
Fire of Love	co-production with Hunting Lane Films, Submarine Deluxe and Sandbox Films
The Glitch	co-production with Defiant by Nature
Incidents	co-production with House Productions
Lottery	co-production with Permut Presentations, 3311 and Red Crown
A Manual for Cleaning Women	co-production with New Republic Pictures and Dirty Films
Mockingbird	
Seconds	co-production with Marc Platt Productions
Tender Is the Night	co-production with LuckyChap Entertainment, Putnam PIctures and Moonslinger Productions
Small Parts	
Untitled Mahalia Belo film	
Untitled Matt Rogers and Bowen Yang film	co-production with 3 Arts Entertainment
Untitled Taylor Swift film	co-production with Taylor Swift Productions

== See also ==
- List of Fox Searchlight Pictures films (1995–1999)
- List of Fox Searchlight Pictures films (2000–2009)
- List of Fox Searchlight Pictures films (2010–2019)
