= List of Metro-Goldwyn-Mayer films (1990–1999) =

The following is a list of films originally produced and/or distributed theatrically by Metro-Goldwyn-Mayer and released in the 1990s.

(company known as MGM-Pathe Communications Co., Metro-Goldwyn-Mayer Inc., MGM/UA Distribution Co. and Metro-Goldwyn-Mayer Pictures)

== 1990 ==
Release date	Title	Notes
January 26, 1990	Mortal Passions	U.S. distribution only; produced by Gibraltar Releasing Organization
February 9, 1990	Stanley & Iris	co-production with Lantana Productions
March 16, 1990	Blue Steel (Note: Owned by Lionsgate)	North American distribution only; produced by Lightning Pictures, Precision Films, Mack-Taylor Productions and Edward R. Pressman Productions
May 4, 1990	Daddy's Dyin': Who's Got the Will?	North American distribution only; produced by Propaganda Films
August 24, 1990	Delta Force 2: The Colombian Connection	North American theatrical distribution only; produced by Cannon Films
September 14, 1990	Death Warrant	distribution in North America, the U.K., Ireland, Australia, New Zealand, France and Spain only; produced by Pathe Entertainment
October 5, 1990	Desperate Hours (Note: MGM now owns worldwide rights to this film, having acquired PolyGram Filmed Entertainment's pre-1996 library that included the catalog of Dino De Laurentiis Communications, the international rights holder of the film)	North American distribution only; produced by Dino De Laurentiis Communications
October 19, 1990	Quigley Down Under	distribution outside Latin America, Germany, Austria, Switzerland, the Netherlands, Italy, Australia and New Zealand only; produced by Pathé Entertainment
December 7, 1990	Instant Karma	North American distribution only; produced by Rosenbloom Entertainment and Desert Winds Films
December 19, 1990	The Russia House	distribution in North America, the U.K., Ireland, Australia, New Zealand, France, Italy, Spain, Belgium and Scandinavia only; produced by Pathé Entertainment

== 1991 ==
Release date	Title	Notes
January 11, 1991	Not Without My Daughter	distribution outside Latin America, Germany, Austria, Switzerland, the Netherlands and Italy only; produced by Pathé Entertainment and Ufland Productions
May 24, 1991	Thelma & Louise	distribution outside France, Germany, Austria, Switzerland, Italy and Japan only; produced by Pathé Entertainment and Percy Main Productions; Inducted into the National Film Registry in 2016
June 28, 1991	Fires Within	co-production with Nicita/Lloyd Productions
July 26, 1991	Life Stinks	North American distribution only; produced by Brooksfilms
August 9, 1991	Delirious	—
August 23, 1991	Harley Davidson and the Marlboro Man	rights licensed to Scotia Filmverleih for Germany and Austria and Nippon Herald Films for Japan
September 6, 1991	Crooked Hearts	co-production with A&M Films
September 6, 1991	Company Business	distribution outside Germany and Austria only; originally produced under Pathé Entertainment
September 13, 1991	Liebestraum	co-production with Initial
September 20, 1991	The Indian Runner	North American distribution only; produced by the Mount Film Group and Mico/NHK Enterprises
September 27, 1991	Timebomb	North American distribution only; produced by Dino De Laurentiis Communications (uncredited)
October 4, 1991	The Man in the Moon	originally produced under Pathé Entertainment
October 11, 1991	Shattered	North American distribution only; produced by Capella Films and Davis Entertainment
December 22, 1991	Rush	co-production with the Zanuck Company

== 1992 ==
Release date	Title	Notes
March 6, 1992	Once Upon a Crime	North American distribution only; produced by Dino De Laurentiis Communications
March 27, 1992	The Cutting Edge	co-production with Interscope Communications
May 8, 1992	CrissCross	co-production with Hawn/Sylbert Movie Company
May 15, 1992	The Vagrant	North American distribution only; produced by Brooksfilms and Le Studio Canal+
August 14, 1992	Diggstown	co-production with Schaffel/Eclectic Films
October 2, 1992	Of Mice and Men	—
October 30, 1992	The Lover (Note: Owned by Pathé, with U.S. distribution rights currently licensed to Capelight Pictures)	North American distribution only

== 1993 ==
Release date	Title	Notes
January 15, 1993	Body of Evidence	North American, Australian and New Zealand distribution only; produced by Dino De Laurentiis Communications
February 12, 1993	Untamed Heart	—
March 5, 1993	Rich in Love	co-production with the Zanuck Company
April 16, 1993	Benny & Joon	co-production with Roth/Arnold Productions
August 6, 1993	The Meteor Man	co-production with Tinsel Townsend Productions
September 10, 1993	Undercover Blues	co-production with Lobell/Bergman Productions and Hera Productions
October 22, 1993	Flight of the Innocent	U.S. distribution only
October 29, 1993	Fatal Instinct	co-production with Jacobs/Gardner Productions
November 19, 1993	Dangerous Game	North American distribution only; produced by Cecchi Gori Europa, Eye Productions and the Maverick Picture Company
December 8, 1993	Six Degrees of Separation	distribution in North America, France, Italy, Spain, Japan and worldwide home media only; co-production with Maiden Movies and New Regency

== 1994 ==
Release date	Title	Notes
May 6, 1994	Clean Slate	co-production with the Zanuck Company
May 6, 1994	That's Entertainment! III (Note: Owned by Warner Bros. Entertainment)	distribution only; produced by Turner Entertainment Co.
June 17, 1994	Getting Even with Dad	co-production with Jacobs/Gardner Productions
July 1, 1994	Blown Away	co-production with Trilogy Entertainment Group
September 23, 1994	It Runs in the Family	later retitled My Summer Story
October 28, 1994	Stargate (Note: MGM has since reclaimed distribution rights to Stargate from StudioCanal)	North American theatrical and television distribution only; produced by Carolco Pictures, Le Studio Canal+ and Centropolis Film Productions
December 16, 1994	Speechless	co-production with Forge Productions

== 1995 ==
Release date	Title	Notes
April 12, 1995	The Pebble and the Penguin	North American distribution only; produced by Don Bluth Limited
June 2, 1995	Fluke	co-production with Rocket Pictures
July 7, 1995	Species	—
October 20, 1995	Get Shorty	co-production with Jersey Films
December 22, 1995	Cutthroat Island (Note: Owned by StudioCanal, with U.S. distribution rights licensed to Rialto Pictures and Lionsgate)	North American theatrical distribution only; produced by Carolco Pictures, Forge Productions, Laurence Mark Productions and Beckner/Gorman Productions

== 1996 ==
Release date	Title	Notes
January 12, 1996	Bio-Dome	co-production with Motion Picture Corporation of America
February 23, 1996	Unforgettable	North American distribution only; produced by Dino De Laurentiis Company
March 29, 1996	All Dogs Go to Heaven 2	released under MGM Animation label
April 26, 1996	Mulholland Falls (Note: Distribution rights co-owned by Resurgence Media Group)	North American distribution only; co-production with Largo Entertainment and the Zanuck Company
June 14, 1996	Moll Flanders	North American distribution only; co-production with Spelling Films and Trilogy Entertainment Group
July 19, 1996	Fled	—
July 26, 1996	Kingpin (Note: Owned by Shamrock Holdings, with distribution rights currently licensed to Paramount Pictures)	North American distribution excluding television only; produced by Rysher Entertainment and Motion Picture Corporation of America
August 14, 1996	House Arrest	North American theatrical distribution only; produced by Rysher Entertainment
September 27, 1996	2 Days in the Valley	North American theatrical distribution only; produced by Rysher Entertainment and Redemption Productions

== 1997 ==
Release date	Title	Notes
January 10, 1997	Turbulence	North American theatrical distribution only; produced by Rysher Entertainment
January 24, 1997	Zeus and Roxanne	North American theatrical distribution only; produced by Rysher Entertainment
May 2, 1997	Warriors of Virtue (Note: MGM has since reclaimed international rights to Warriors of Virtue)	North American distribution only; produced by Law Brothers Entertainment
September 12, 1997	The End of Violence	North American distribution only; produced by CiBy 2000 Pictures, Road Movies Filmproduktion and Kintop Pictures
October 31, 1997	Red Corner	co-production with Avnet/Kerner Productions

== 1998 ==
Release date	Title	Notes
January 30, 1998	Deceiver	U.S. distribution only; produced by MDP Worldwide
April 10, 1998	Species II	co-production with FGM Entertainment
June 12, 1998	Dirty Work	co-production with Robert Simonds Productions
July 24, 1998	Disturbing Behavior	North American distribution only; co-production with Beacon Communications

== 1999 ==
Release date	Title	Notes
January 15, 1999	At First Sight	—
March 26, 1999	The Mod Squad	—
September 10, 1999	Stigmata	co-production with FGM Entertainment
October 22, 1999	Molly	co-production with Cockamamie Productions and Absolute Entertainment
November 19, 1999	The World Is Not Enough	co-production with Eon Productions
November 24, 1999	Flawless	co-production with Tribeca Productions; international rights outside Latin America and Asia excluding Korea licensed to United Artists

== See also ==
- Lists of Metro-Goldwyn-Mayer films
