= List of Metro-Goldwyn-Mayer films (1980–1989) =

The following is a list of films originally produced and/or distributed theatrically by Metro-Goldwyn-Mayer and released in the 1980s.

(company known as Metro-Goldwyn-Mayer Film Co., MGM/UA Entertainment Co., MGM Entertainment Co. and MGM/UA Communications Co.)

== 1980 ==
Release date	Title	Notes
February 8, 1980	Hero at Large	co-production with Kings Road Entertainment
March 21, 1980	Hide in Plain Sight	
May 16, 1980	Fame	Inducted into the National Film Registry in 2023
August 8, 1980	Why Would I Lie?	co-production with Aurora Productions
August 29, 1980	He Knows You're Alone	distribution only
December 19, 1980	The Formula	co-production with CIP Filmproduktions

== 1981 ==
Release date	Title	Notes
February 27, 1981	Sunday Lovers	North American, U.K. and Irish distribution only
June 12, 1981	Clash of the Titans	
July 24, 1981	Tarzan, the Ape Man	co-production with Svengali Productions
October 9, 1981	Rich and Famous	
October 16, 1981	...All the Marbles	co-production with the Aldrich Company
December 2, 1981	Whose Life Is It Anyway?	
December 11, 1981	Buddy Buddy	
December 11, 1981	Pennies from Heaven	

== 1982 ==
Release date	Title	Notes
January 22, 1982	A Stranger Is Watching	
January 22, 1982	Shoot the Moon	co-production with Fortress FIlms (uncredited)
February 12, 1982	Cannery Row	
March 2, 1982	Diner	
March 19, 1982	Victor/Victoria	
June 4, 1982	Poltergeist	
July 30, 1982	Forced Vengeance	
August 13, 1982 (Note: Released in international theaters on July 14, 1982.)	Pink Floyd The Wall (Note: Co-owned by Sony Music)	distribution outside West Germany and Austria only
August 20, 1982	The Beastmaster (Note: Owned by Shout! Studios)	U.S. and English-speaking Canadian distribution only; produced by Leisure Investment Company
September 10, 1982	Endangered Species	co-production with Alive Enterprises
September 17, 1982	Inchon	North American theatrical distribution only; produced by One Way Productions
September 24, 1982	Yes, Giorgio	
October 1, 1982	My Favorite Year	co-production with Brooksfilms
December 4, 1982	Witness for the Prosecution	A television film

== 1983 ==
Release date	Title	Notes
January 21, 1983 (Note: Released in international theaters on December 17, 1982.)	The Year of Living Dangerously	
February 13, 1983	Twilight Time (Note: Retained by MGM)	distribution outside Yugoslavia only; produced by Centar Film and Dan Tana Productions
April 29, 1983	The Hunger	co-production with the Richard Shepherd Company
August 26, 1983	Hercules (Note: MGM now owns worldwide rights to this film as a result of its merger with Pathé Communications in 1990 (the latter company of which had acquired The Cannon Group in 1989))	North American theatrical and home media distribution only; produced by the Cannon Group
August 26, 1983	Strange Brew	
September 7, 1983	Revenge of the Ninja	North American theatrical and home media distribution only; produced by the Cannon Group
September 30, 1983	Brainstorm	co-production with JF Productions
October 28, 1983	The Wicked Lady	North American theatrical and home media distribution only; produced by the Cannon Group
November 18, 1983	A Christmas Story	Inducted into the National Film Registry in 2012

== 1984 ==
Release date	Title	Notes
February 3, 1984	Reckless	
March 2, 1984	Over the Brooklyn Bridge	North American theatrical and home media distribution only; produced by the Cannon Group
March 2, 1984	Sahara	North American theatrical and home media distribution only; produced by the Cannon Group
March 16, 1984	The Ice Pirates	co-production with JF Productions
March 30, 1984	Misunderstood	North American distribution only; produced by Accent Films and Keith Barish Productions
May 4, 1984	Breakin'	North American theatrical and home media distribution only; produced by the Cannon Group
May 18, 1984	Making the Grade	North American theatrical and home media distribution only; produced by the Cannon Group
July 20, 1984	Electric Dreams	North American, Japanese and Southeast Asian distribution only; produced by Virgin Pictures
August 24, 1984	Oxford Blues	North American distribution only
September 1984	Nothing Lasts Forever	released under MGM/UA Classics
November 16, 1984	Just the Way You Are	
December 7, 1984	2010: The Year We Make Contact	
December 26, 1984	Mrs. Soffel	co-production with Scott Rudin Productions

== 1985 ==
Release date	Title	Notes
January 18, 1985	That's Dancing!	
February 1, 1985	Heavenly Bodies	Canadian film; North American theatrical distribution only; produced by RSL Entertainment Corporation
April 12, 1985	Cat's Eye	North American distribution only; produced by Dino De Laurentiis Corporation
May 3, 1985	Gymkata	distribution only; produced by Fred Weintraub Productions
July 3, 1985	Red Sonja	North American distribution only; produced by Dino De Laurentiis Corporation
August 16, 1985	Year of the Dragon	North American distribution only; produced by Dino De Laurentiis Corporation
September 27, 1985	Code Name: Emerald	distribution only; produced by NBC Productions
September 27, 1985	Marie	North American distribution only; produced by Dino De Laurentiis Corporation
November 22, 1985	Fever Pitch	

== 1986 ==
Release date	Title	Notes
February 21, 1986	9½ Weeks	North American distribution only; produced by Producers Sales Organization, Jonesfilm, Galactic Films and Triple Ajaxxx
February 21, 1986	Dream Lover	
March 28, 1986	Ginger and Fred	North American distribution only; produced by Produzioni Europee Associati
April 18, 1986	Wise Guys	
May 9, 1986	Killer Party	co-production with Polar Entertainment, Telecom Entertainment and Marquis Productions; Last film in the pre-May 1986 library owned by Warner Bros. via Turner Entertainment Co.
May 23, 1986	Poltergeist II: The Other Side	First film in the post-May 1986 library owned by MGM itself
June 27, 1986	Running Scared	co-production with the Turman-Foster Company
August 29, 1986	Shanghai Surprise (Note: Owned by Handmade Films)	North American theatrical and television distribution only; produced by HandMade Films
September 19, 1986	Where the River Runs Black	
November 26, 1986	Solarbabies	distribution only; produced by Brooksfilms

== 1987 ==
Release date	Title	Notes
February 6, 1987	Dead of Winter	
April 17, 1987	Walk Like a Man	
June 5, 1987	P.I. Private Investigations	North American distribution only; produced by PolyGram Movies
June 5, 1987	Captive Hearts	
June 24, 1987	Spaceballs	distribution outside France and Spain only; produced by Brooksfilms
October 9, 1987	O.C. and Stiggs	
October 30, 1987	Fatal Beauty	co-production with CST Communications
December 16, 1987	Moonstruck	Nominated for Academy Award for Best Picture
December 16, 1987	Overboard	

== 1988 ==
Release date	Title	Notes
February 26, 1988	Taffin	North American distribution only; co-production with United British Pictures and Rafford Films
March 11, 1988	Masquerade	co-production with Michael I. Levy Enterprises
May 6, 1988	Whoops Apocalypse (Note: Owned by ITV Studios)	North American distribution only; produced by ITC Entertainment and Picture Partnership
May 20, 1988	Willow (Note: Owned by Disney (via Walt Disney Pictures and Lucasfilm with the MGM logo still appearing in later home media releases))	theatrical and free television distribution only; produced by Lucasfilm Ltd. and Imagine Entertainment
June 10, 1988	Poltergeist III	
July 15, 1988	A Fish Called Wanda	co-production with Prominent Features
September 9, 1988	Some Girls	co-production with Wildwood Enterprises and the Oxford Film Company
September 23, 1988	Spellbinder	co-production with Indian Neck Entertainment and Wizan Film Properties
October 7, 1988	Memories of Me	co-production with Odyssey Entertainment
November 18, 1988	Last Rites	
December 2, 1988	Blueberry Hill	U.S. theatrical distribution only; produced by Mediacom Productions and Tricoast Production Partners

== 1989 ==
Release date	Title	Notes
January 13, 1989	The January Man	
February 3, 1989	Wicked Stepmother	co-production with Larco Productions
February 16, 1989	The Mighty Quinn	co-production with A&M Films
March 3, 1989	Mind Games (Note: Owned by Yari Film Group)	U.S. theatrical distribution only; produced by MTA and Persik Productions
March 17, 1989	Leviathan	North American distribution only; produced by Filmauro and the Gordon Company
September 20, 1989	A Dry White Season	
October 27, 1989	Kill Me Again	North American distribution only; produced by PolyGram Movies and Propaganda Films
November 3, 1989	After Midnight	co-production with High Bar Pictures
November 10, 1989	Survival Quest	U.S. theatrical distribution only; produced by Starway International
December 1, 1989	Dance to Win	U.S. theatrical distribution only; produced by Ascot Film

== See also ==
- Lists of Metro-Goldwyn-Mayer films

== Notes ==
Release notes
