= Lists of Metro-Goldwyn-Mayer films =

This is a list of feature films originally released and/or distributed by Metro-Goldwyn-Mayer (to include MGM/UA Entertainment Co., MGM/UA Communications Co., MGM-Pathe Communications Co. and MGM/UA Distribution Co.).

This list does not include films from United Artists before it merged with MGM (except for co-productions), or other studios that MGM acquired (such as Orion Pictures, The Samuel Goldwyn Company, and Cannon Films).

MGM's pre-May 1986 library and That's Entertainment! III are currently owned by Warner Bros. Entertainment via the Turner Entertainment Co. label with some exceptions, most notable are Babes in Toyland, Twilight Time and Electric Dreams, owned by MGM themselves, The Hobbit trilogy is co-owned with New Line Cinema and the rights to the 1988 film Willow is currently owned by Walt Disney Studios Motion Pictures via Walt Disney Pictures and Lucasfilm. Additionally, the rights to the Hal Roach Studios short films by MGM are owned by Sonar Entertainment Inc.

The films are divided into lists by decade:

- List of Metro-Goldwyn-Mayer films (1924–1929)
- List of Metro-Goldwyn-Mayer films (1930–1939)
- List of Metro-Goldwyn-Mayer films (1940–1949)
- List of Metro-Goldwyn-Mayer films (1950–1959)
- List of Metro-Goldwyn-Mayer films (1960–1969)
- List of Metro-Goldwyn-Mayer films (1970–1979)
- List of Metro-Goldwyn-Mayer films (1980–1989)
- List of Metro-Goldwyn-Mayer films (1990–1999)
- List of Metro-Goldwyn-Mayer films (2000–2009)
- List of Metro-Goldwyn-Mayer films (2010–2019)
- List of Metro-Goldwyn-Mayer films (2020–2029)

== See also ==
- List of United Artists films
- List of Orion Pictures films
- List of Amazon MGM Studios films
- List of Amazon Prime Video original films
