= Pamela Gidley =

American actress and model (1965–2018)

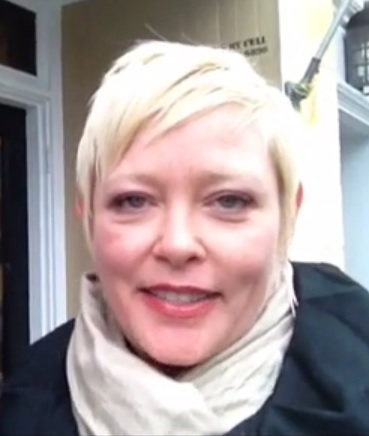
- Gidley in 2012
- Born: Pamela Catherine Gidley; June 11, 1965; Methuen, Massachusetts, U.S.
- Died: April 16, 2018 (aged 52); Seabrook, New Hampshire, U.S.
- Occupations: Actress; model
- Years active: 1986–2006
- Spouse: James Lew (m. 2005; div. 2008)

Pamela Catherine Gidley (June 11, 1965 – April 16, 2018) was an American actress and model. She began her career as an actress in 1986, debuting in the film Thrashin', before appearing in a number of films, including Dudes (1987), Cherry 2000 (1988), The Blue Iguana (1988), Permanent Record (1988), Liebestraum (1991), Highway to Hell (1992), Twin Peaks: Fire Walk with Me (1992), Jane Austen's Mafia (1998), and The Little Vampire (2000).

Gidley is also known for her roles in television series, including Strange Luck as Audrey Weston (1995–1996), and her recurring role as Brigitte on The Pretender (1997–2000).

== Life and career ==
Gidley was born in Methuen, Massachusetts, and raised in Salem, New Hampshire. She was the third of four siblings and the only daughter. She had two older brothers, Glenn and Daniel, and one younger brother, Brian.

She won the Wilhemina Modeling Agency's "Most Beautiful Girl in the World" contest on March 12, 1985, in Sydney, Australia. As her modeling career had taken off, Gidley studied acting at the New York Academy of Dramatic Art under actress and acting teacher Stella Adler, who ran the Stella Adler Studio of Acting. She eventually moved to Los Angeles to pursue her career in acting.

Gidley made her acting debut in the 1986 film Thrashin'. She appeared in several films of the 1980s, including Dudes, Permanent Record, The Blue Iguana, and Cherry 2000. Gidley starred in many films throughout the 1990s, including Twin Peaks: Fire Walk with Me, a prequel to the short-lived television series; Disturbed, alongside Malcolm McDowell; Highway to Hell; the comedy Jane Austen's Mafia!; the comedy horror Aberration, a film in which she starred in the lead role; and Kiss & Tell, a film in which Gidley also served as producer. In 2000, she appeared in the family comedy The Little Vampire. Her last film was the direct-to-video comedy Cake Boy.

Gidley is perhaps best known for her roles in television series. Her first appearance in television was in an episode of the action adventure series MacGyver. She had three appearances as Army Lieutenant Nikki Raines in Tour of Duty during the 1987–1988 season. She also had the recurring role of Brigitte Parker in The Pretender. Her character was the first to be introduced on the show's official website before any of the episodes had aired. She played another recurring character, Teri Miller on CSI: Crime Scene Investigation. She appeared in the show's first and third seasons.

She starred as Audrey Westin in the short-lived mystery series Strange Luck which lasted one season. Other television credits include Crime Story, Tour of Duty, and the serial drama Skin, which was cancelled after just eight episodes, and she guest starred in an episode of The Closer.

== Death ==
Gidley died at her home in Seabrook, New Hampshire, on April 16, 2018, aged 52. The cause of death was undisclosed.

== Filmography ==
=== Film ===
| Year | Title | Role | Notes |
|---|---|---|---|
| 1986 | Thrashin' | Chrissy | |
| 1987 | Dudes | Elyse | |
| 1988 | Cherry 2000 | Cherry 2000 | |
| 1988 | The Blue Iguana | Dakota | |
| 1988 | Permanent Record | Kim | |
| 1990 | The Last of the Finest | Haley | |
| 1990 | Disturbed | Sandy Ramirez | |
| 1991 | Liebestraum | Jane Kessler | |
| 1992 | Highway to Hell | Clara | |
| 1992 | Twin Peaks: Fire Walk with Me | Teresa Banks | |
| 1992 | Love Is Like That | Eloise | |
| 1993 | Paper Hearts | Samantha | |
| 1994 | Freefall | Katy Mazur | |
| 1994 | S.F.W. | Janet Streeter | |
| 1994 | The Crew | Jennifer Pierce | |
| 1996 | The Little Death | Kelly Hannon | |
| 1997 | Aberration | Amy Harding / Alex Langdon | |
| 1997 | Kiss & Tell | Beta Carotene | |
| 1997 | Bombshell | Melinda Clark | |
| 1997 | The Maze | Bertha | |
| 1998 | Mafia! | Pepper Gianini | |
| 1998 | The Treat | Dolly | |
| 1999 | Liar's Poker | Linda | |
| 2000 | The Little Vampire | Dottie Thompson | |
| 2000 | Goodbye Casanova | Hilly | |
| 2001 | True Blue | Beck | |
| 2001 | Puzzled | Susan | |
| 2002 | Luster | Alyssa | |
| 2002 | Landspeed | Linda Fincher | |
| 2005 | Cake Boy | Becky | Direct-to-video |
| 2014 | Twin Peaks: The Missing Pieces | Teresa Banks | archive footage from Twin Peaks: Fire Walk With Me |

=== Television ===
| Year | Title | Role | Notes |
|---|---|---|---|
| 1986 | MacGyver | Gina | Episode: "Final Approach" |
| 1987 | Crime Story | Teddi Butler | Episode: "Love Hurts" |
| 1987–1988 | Tour of Duty | Lieutenant Nikki Raines | Episodes: "Nowhere to Run", "Angel of Mercy", "The Hill" |
| 1988 | Glory Days | Diane | TV film |
| 1990 | Blue Bayou | Deanie Fortenot Serulla | TV film |
| 1992 | Angel Street | Detective Dorothy Paretsky | TV film |
| 1992 | Angel Street | Detective Dorothy Paretsky | Main role |
| 1995–1996 | Strange Luck | Audrey Westin | Main role, 17 episodes |
| 1997–2000 | The Pretender | Brigitte | Recurring role, 17 episodes |
| 1998 | Man Made | Kitty | TV film |
| 2000 | Goodbye Casanova | Hilly | TV film |
| 2000–2002 | CSI: Crime Scene Investigation | Teri Miller | 5 episodes |
| 2003–2004 | Skin | Barbara Goldman | Recurring role, 6 episodes |
| 2006 | The Closer | Annalisa Mundy | Episode: "Head Over Heels" |

=== Documentary ===
- 1997 Scratch the Surface
- 2014 Moving Through Time: Fire Walk with Me Memories (Video short)
