= Carmen Filpi =

American actor (1923–2003)

- Born: March 22, 1923; Pittsfield, Massachusetts, U.S.
- Died: May 9, 2003 (aged 80); Washington, D.C., U.S.
- Occupation: Actor
- Years active: 1969–2002

Carmen Filpi (March 22, 1923 – May 9, 2003) was an American character actor who starred in films and on television.

== Biography ==
His first acting job was in the 1969 film Wild Gypsies. He also starred in The Ice Pirates (1984), Pee-Wee's Big Adventure (1985), Beetlejuice (1988), Life Stinks (1991), Wayne's World (1992), and The Wedding Singer (1998). Carmen also acted in the 2000 made-for-TV film Goodbye Casanova with Yasmine Bleeth. Carmen's final film was in the 2002 film Eight Crazy Nights.

He also starred in the 1988 horror film Halloween 4: The Return of Michael Myers as the Reverend Jackson P. Sayer.

Filpi made many guest appearances in TV series. Some of those appearances range from Baretta, Barney Miller, WKRP in Cincinnati, Growing Pains, Quantum Leap, Married...with Children, The Fresh Prince of Bel-Air, Roseanne, Everybody Loves Raymond, Home Improvement, and Sabrina, the Teenage Witch. He had a recurring role in the short-lived series Freebie and the Bean.

== Death ==
Filpi died on May 9, 2003, at the age of 80.

== Filmography ==
- Wild Gypsies (1969)—Felipe
- Garden of the Dead (1972)—Nolan
- Perpetual Motion Machine (1973)—Man
- Capone (1975)—Waiter
- Which Way Is Up? (1977)—Wino
- The Lord of the Rings (1978)
- Boulevard Nights (1979)—Mr. Diaz
- On the Nickel (1980)
- Escape from New York (1981)—Bum
- Carbon Copy (1981)—Wino
- 10 to Midnight (1983)—Hotel Clerk
- The Ice Pirates (1984)—Vendor
- The Sure Thing (1985)—Bus Station Bum
- Pee-Wee's Big Adventure (1985)—Hobo Jack
- The Boys Next Door (1985)—Bum
- Runaway Train (1985)—Signal Maintainer no. 40
- My Chauffeur (1986)—Mop Man
- Hollywood Zap! (1986)—Magazine Vendor
- Walk Like a Man (1987)—Butler
- Who's That Girl (1987)—Street Bum #1
- Beetlejuice (1988)—Messenger
- Halloween 4: The Return of Michael Myers (1988)—Rev. Jackson P. Sayer
- Harlem Nights (1989)—Doorman
- Repo Jake (1990)—Amos
- Iron Maze (1991)—Charlie
- Alligator II: The Mutation (1991)—Wino Henry
- Life Stinks (1991)—Pops (Elevens-Up)
- Wayne's World (1992)—Old Man Withers
- The Larry Sanders Show (1992)—Bert Crawley
- The Beverly Hillbillies (1993)—Frank
- Ed Wood (1994)—Old Crusty Man
- Meet Wally Sparks (1997)—Bum
- MouseHunt (1997)—Pallbearer #4
- The Wayans Bros. (1997)—Officer Young
- The Wedding Singer (1998)—Old Man in Bar
- Phoenix (1998)—Locksmith
- Dante's View (1998)—Hall of Famer
- Knowing (2000)
- Goodbye Casanova (2000)—Festus
- The 4th Tenor (2002)—Bum #1
- Eight Crazy Nights (2002)—Homeless Guy (voice)
- Back by Midnight (2002)—Herbert (final film role)
