= Landspeed =

2002 American sports drama film

- Film poster
- Directed by: Christian McIntire
- Written by: Michael Baldwin
- Starring: Billy Zane; Ray Wise; Pamela Gidley
- Cinematography: Todd Barron
- Music by: Rich McHugh
- Release date: 2002
- Running time: 94 minutes
- Country: United States
- Language: English

Landspeed is a 2002 American sports drama film directed by Christian McIntire and starring Billy Zane and Ray Wise.

== Plot ==
Set in 1972 in the Nevada desert, the film is about six American racing teams that are trying to surpass the 1,000 miles per hour land speed record. Landspeed stars Billy Zane and Ray Wise as a father-son duo who are attempting the feat, which comes with a $50 million award. Writing in the Billings Gazette, Jay Bobbin said "that effort is fraught with tension and danger, but the men remain determined to reach their goal".

== Cast ==
- Billy Zane as Michael Sanger
- Ray Wise as Brian Sanger
- Pamela Gidley as Linda Fincher
- William Zabka as Bob Bailey

== Reception ==
In a positive review of the film, May Thornton wrote in The Advertiser, "Zane quips and smirks his way through, enjoys a little subplot about childhood sweethearts, but the real stars are the cars, backed with impressive special effects. The final word: Going, going, gone in 90 minutes." VideoHound gave the film 1.5 stars and concluded "It's helpful to forget your knowledge of physics."
