= Harley Davidson and the Marlboro Man =

1991 film by Simon Wincer

- Theatrical release poster
- Directed by: Simon Wincer
- Written by: Don Michael Paul
- Produced by: Jere Henshaw
- Starring: Mickey Rourke; Don Johnson; Chelsea Field; Tom Sizemore; Vanessa Williams; Daniel Baldwin; Giancarlo Esposito; Robert Ginty
- Cinematography: David Eggby
- Edited by: Corky Ehlers
- Music by: Basil Poledouris
- Production company: MGM-Pathé; Laredo Productions; Krisjair
- Distributed by: Metro-Goldwyn-Mayer
- Release date: August 23, 1991
- Running time: 98 minutes
- Country: United States
- Language: English
- Budget: $18 million–$23 million
- Box office: $7.4 million (U.S.)

Harley Davidson and the Marlboro Man is a 1991 American neo-Western biker buddy action film directed by Simon Wincer and starring Mickey Rourke, Don Johnson, Chelsea Field, Tom Sizemore, Vanessa Williams (who also contributes to the film's soundtrack), Daniel Baldwin, Giancarlo Esposito and Robert Ginty.

Set in the near future United States, it concerns two friends–a melancholic biker and a world-weary bullrider–who rob the bank threatening their favorite bar with foreclosure in hopes of paying it off with its own money, only to discover that it is a front for a criminal cartel. It has frequently been described as a modern re-imagining of Butch Cassidy and the Sundance Kid.

The film was released by on August 23, 1991, to mostly negative reviews, and was a financial failure, grossing $7.4 million at the domestic box office. In the years since, it has developed a moderate cult following.

== Plot ==
In the near future, a man called Harley Davidson travels from Texas to Burbank, California to reconnect with his old friend Robert Lee "Marlboro Man" Edison at their old haunt; Rock & Roll Bar & Grille. Their mutual friend Jack Daniels holds animosity towards Harley over an affair he and his now-wife Lulu had years prior. The bar has fallen on hard times, and the Great Trust Bank threatened foreclosure, planning to demolish the building to make way for a skyscraper. Harley and Robert convince Jack to help them rob one of the Bank's armored cars to collect the funds necessary to renew the building's lease. The robbery is successful. However, upon escaping, they discover the loot they stole contains not money, but "Crystal Dream," a new, experimental street drug.

The bank's head of security Alexander is ordered by CEO Chance Wilder to recover the drugs and kill the thieves. Meanwhile, Robert is pulled over for speeding by a motorcycle cop, his ex-lover Virginia Slim. The two have sex that night, despite her being engaged. Harley takes Virginia to breakfast the next morning, during which she says that Crystal Dream is 100% addictive and causes lasting neurological damage and, eventually, death. Robert, fuming about Virginia's upcoming marriage, steals her fiancé's motorcycle. He and Harley go to the bank's headquarters and talk to Wilder via telephone. They demand $2.5 million in exchange for the drugs. Wilder agrees to have someone meet them that night in the airplane graveyard for the exchange. Alexander shows up with the money and the transfer goes off successfully. That night, while they hang out in the bar's back room celebrating, Marlboro is suspicious of the ease of the exchange. Alexander and his men then show up. Watching through a one-way mirror, the owner tries to convince them that the gang is not there. Alexander walks away as if to leave, but then turns around and shoots him. They open fire in the room behind the mirror; Harley and Marlboro are the only ones who escape alive.

The two retreat to the nearby airport and hide in the baggage compartment of a plane. They escape to Las Vegas, where they check into a hotel, only to be tracked down by Alexander. The two escape to the hotel's roof and jump off into a swimming pool. Harley realizes that they have been tracked with a device hidden in the dollar coin given to them by Alexander. The two hop a freight train headed east after deactivating the tracker, but Marlboro leaves after telling Harley that they owe it to the dead friends who helped them to return to LA and settle things. Harley refuses to go and Marlboro jumps off the train. Harley has a change of heart and catches up with Marlboro. They reactivate the tracker in the coin to lure Alexander's squad back to the airplane graveyard. On their way there, tensions arise between Alexander and the gang's pilot, Thom. The villains locate the money briefcase but find it empty, except for the dollar coin inside, and a gunfight ensues. Marlboro manages to take out Alexander's remaining men, before he is subdued by the latter. However, Harley overcomes his aiming problems and shoots Alexander dead.

The duo offers Thom some cash to switch sides and take them to Wilder's office. They return the drug money and demand he change the lease on the bar, but Marlboro can't get himself to kill the unarmed kingpin before a pair of guards comes his rescue. Wilder orders the heroes killed, when Thom appears through the window in his chopper. He activates a cannon concealed under the aircraft, mowing down Wilder's goons and tearing down his office, before waving his former employer goodbye. A dismayed Wilder insults Marlboro's dead father, finally causing the cowboy to retaliate. Wilder is left dangling out of the broken window, holding onto Marlboro's disintegrating cowboy boot. Harley helps him out, the boot comes apart and Wilder falls to his death. Marlboro and Harley part ways at a rodeo, where Marlboro is riding a bull. As Harley rides away, he picks up a female hitchhiker.

== Cast ==
- Mickey Rourke as Harley Davidson
- Don Johnson as Robert Lee "Marlboro Man" Edison
- Chelsea Field as Officer Virginia Slim
- Tom Sizemore as Chance Wilder
- Daniel Baldwin as Alexander
- Vanessa Williams as Lulu Daniels
- Giancarlo Esposito as Jimmy Jiles
- Robert Ginty as Thom
- Tia Carrere as Kimiko
- Big John Studd as Jack Daniels
- Julius Harris as 'The Old Man' Jiles
- Eloy Casados as Jose Cuervo
- Kelly Hu as Suzie
- Branscombe Richmond as Big Indian
- Sven-Ole Thorsen as David
- Stan Ivar as Jake McAllister

== Production ==
=== Development and casting ===
Don Michael Paul wrote the film while working as an actor on television, and took inspiration from the Western Butch Cassidy and the Sundance Kid. A best case scenario would have seen the project become a starring vehicle for himself, but he recognized that his limited drawing power might not allow it. It was the 28-year old's ninth attempt at writing a script, and the first to get produced. He had previously pitched more intimate stories, which were dismissed as "too soft", so he went for a more action-based premise while attempting to keep the main characters' relationship front and center. The script was on the market for only two days. Thanks to a producer acquaintance who interceded in his favor, he landed a four-picture development deal with MGM-Pathé, which enabled him to co-produce the film, and direct two future efforts. He was paid $450,000 for this film. A pre-production report mentioned that the antagonists would be "Aryan" drug dealers, an element that is absent from the finished picture. Mickey Rourke, Don Johnson and Australian director Simon Wincer, who had just directed the modestly successful Quigley Down Under for Pathé, were announced to have signed on in early August 1990.

Rourke's participation was brokered by his CAA agent Rick Nicita, as the actor was in need of a commercial role after a string of flops. He also wanted to prove that he could be a collaborative force on a major Hollywood shoot, and counter his difficult reputation. He had already been planning a biker film of his own, The Ride, a more personal project inspired by his relationship with his cancer-stricken brother, Joey. He felt ill-at-ease about doing this one purely for career-minded reasons, and made his feelings known during production, admitting to USA Today that he needed money to finish his house and pay for his divorce from Debra Feuer. "If I could do something else where I made as much money, yeah sure, I would," he acknowledged. Rourke was paid $2.6 million.

Johnson was in a similar rut, facing a difficult transition from TV stardom to the big screen, and accusations of entitled behavior. He was paid slightly less than Rourke. This was the first time he was separated from his wife Melanie Griffith since their remarriage in June 1989. Johnson brought with him Miami Vice script doctor and friend Sean "Arizona Slim" Walsh, a former pool hustler. With fellow player Jay Helfert, Walsh wrote the early pool hall scene, which introduces the Marlboro character. While Rourke's tattoos were authentic, Johnson had a fake one applied to his right forearm. Professional wrestler Big John Studd was hired thanks to his participation in The Marrying Man just prior. Action veteran Robert Ginty was announced to have joined the cast shortly before the beginning of filming.

=== Filming ===
Principal photography started October 29, 1990, in Tucson, Arizona, which stands in for parts of the Los Angeles agglomeration. The main production center was the Tucson Convention Center. The bar where Johnson makes his first appearance, known as The Eagle's Nest in narrative, was The Bashful Bandit on East Speedway Boulevard. The pool cue used by Johnson in that scene was lent to him by uncredited writer Helfert. Tucson International Airport subbed in for Burbank Airport, while the aircraft boneyard was located at Davis–Monthan Air Force Base, on the city's periphery. The Alamo Apartments, where Harley lives at the beginning of the film, are a real place although they, too, are located in Tucson rather than Texas as portrayed in narration.

While much of the Las Vegas segment was actually shot at the defunct Dunes Hotel and Casino, the jump into the swimming pool (a callback to Butch Cassidy's cliff jump) was captured at the now closed J.W. Marriott in Century City, California, which had recently been used for a similar scene in Lethal Weapon 2. The 160-foot fall was performed by veteran stuntman and diving specialist Bob Brown, who doubled for both Rourke and Johnson as their characters jumped in succession. The exterior set for the Rock & Roll Bar and Grille was built on a parcel located on East Boyd Street in Los Angeles. The armored truck robbery was filmed near the Walker Foods warehouses on North Myers Street, also in Los Angeles. Big John Studd suffered an injury during his bike stunt, and later sued both Wincer and stunt coordinator Billy Burton, alleging that he had been poorly trained for the scene. The Great Trust Bank building was the then brand new Library Tower, enhanced by matte paintings from Jesse Silver. The billboard advertising the Las Vegas rodeo, under which the leads hang out, was also integrated into a Los Angeles background via matte paintings from Rocco Gioffre. The climax was filmed at a former foundry in Vernon, beginning on January 16.

Rourke's hero rode a customized Harley-Davidson FXRS. Marlboro's first bike was a Kawasaki Z1000, although he later steals an FXR from another character. Virginia Slim's police bike was a Honda PC800. The helicopter flown by Ginty's character was a Bell 222 rented from pilot and aerial filming specialist Rick Shuster of Helinet Aviation Services. The founder of short-lived apparel brand IXSPA, a riding acquaintance of Rourke's, received a cameo as a bartender and hoped to dress the film's characters in their licensed Harley Davidson line. In the end, the company only took credit for making some promotional jackets for the production.

According to a retrospective interview with Johnson, Rourke's tendency to hang around with his entourage threatened to bog down the film's schedule early on, but he quickly sorted out the matter with his co-star and they had no problems after that. Producer Jere Henshaw had a different opinion. Of Rourke, he told the Los Angeles Times, "I'd heard all the horror stories. But Mickey's been great. No temper tantrums at all." However, when asked to compare Johnson to his former collaborator John Wayne, he replied, "Don's not the Duke [Wayne's nickname]. He's not even a pimple on the Duke's ass!" Paul ran afoul of both leading men. He had a scuffle with Rourke, and Johnson tried to have him barred from the set. The writer took his share of the blame for the incidents, and chalked them up in part to his emotional investment in the project. Wincer reassured USA Today that the stars "have both been an utter delight." His diplomatic attitude failed to ingratiate him to Rourke, who told The Village Voice after filming, "I didn't care for the director. He didn't have any balls. Not even one. He came ball-less."

MGM was affected by financial shortcomings under the regime of controversial mogul Giancarlo Parretti, which came to a boil during the Los Angeles leg, as Rourke threatened to strike if he did not get paid, followed a few days later by members of the crew. The studio had paychecks delivered by messenger to resolve the situation. Filming concluded on January 25, 1991. The legal entity used by production was Harley Productions. Because of filming, Rourke had to cancel his participation to a three-round celebrity boxing exhibition against Thomas Hearns, planned for December 8 at the Trump Taj Mahal in Atlantic City, on the undercard of Tyson vs. Stewart. Johnson, a powerboat driver in his spare time, also missed the Offshore Professional Tour World Championships in Key West, and was replaced by fellow actor Kurt Russell.

=== Rodeo ===
Although a billboard was built at the Tucson Rodeo Grounds, the bullriding scene representing the National Finals was shot at the smaller Charles Whitlow Rodeo Grounds in Florence, Arizona. Some sources indicate that rodeo sequences were filmed in collaboration with the Professional Rodeo Cowboys Association. Partial shots of the billboard under which Harley and Marlboro hang out show a slogan for the PRCA National Finals in Las Vegas, however it is omitted from the wider matte shots. Bullfighter Lloyd Ketchum of Montana mentioned that he was paid to shoot one night's worth of B-roll footage for the film in Vegas in December 1990, which does correspond to the time and place of that year's PRCA National Finals Rodeo. Fellow bullfighter Donny Sparks of Texas claimed that he served as Johnson's stunt double.

=== Brands' reactions ===
The naming of the heroes after popular brands was not product placement. Upon its summer 1990 announcement, Pathé acknowledged that it was still trying to get clearance from their respective corporate owners. However, Marlboro's parent Philip Morris sent a letter of complaint to MGM chairman Alan Ladd Jr. in September 1990. In their reply the following month, studio lawyers argued that the title was free speech protected by the First Amendment of the Constitution. The Adventures of Ford Fairlane, Cadillac Man and The Coca-Cola Kid were cited as precedents. A Philip Morris spokesperson remarked, "We don't want our name, our product in any film. We do not think it's an appropriate venue for us." This was apparently to avoid accusations that it was luring potential smokers under the guise of pop culture.

A representative for Harley-Davidson told The Hollywood Reporter that the producers "run the risk of being sued for trademark infringement". Part of their concerns stemmed from their association with a Marlboro competitor, Lorillard Tobacco, in some promotional ventures. The manufacturer also suggested that it might explore a defamation of character lawsuit to circumvent free speech provisions if the protagonist bearing its name proved too unsavory, but hoped that Rourke, as a Harley owner himself, would be respectful of their image. The movie's bikes were still serviced by Harley-Davidson of Tucson during the shoot.

Upon release, Bill Wood, responsible for trademark enforcement at the constructor, said, "After viewing the film last weekend, we felt there were no disparaging references to Harley-Davidson." He added, "We do not believe the movie has any more of a future than the characters in the film." However, he noted that company headquarters were still fielding calls from dealerships believing they had officially endorsed the picture. Philip Morris representatives had not seen the film by launch, but admitted that litigation was not expected from them either. Had it been a hit, the tobacco giant would apparently have considered a media campaign to distance itself from the movie. Hollywood historian Marc Wanamaker also claims that the once famous Marlboro Man billboard on the Sunset Strip in West Hollywood was revamped and enlarged in anticipation of the film.

=== Post-production ===
The feature was edited by Corky Ehlers, who returned from Wincer's hit Western miniseries Lonesome Dove. Like that work, it was edited on the CMX 6000 videodisc platform. The disc format apparently allowed director Wincer to take a copy with him and start working on his cut from his native Australia.

== Release ==
The film was originally announced for August 2, 1991. It received a national sneak preview on August 17, the Saturday preceding its domestic opening. The film's trailer and one-sheet promoted "Harley & Marlboro's Rules of the Road", a humorous list of ten biker principles, which were the exact opposites of the various blunders perpetrated by the characters throughout the film. Interviewed by Business Week after attending a sneak preview in New York City, MGM president Alan Ladd Jr. appeared to show little confidence in the film's potential. While promoting the film, Rourke claimed that he had not bothered watching it.

=== Theatrical ===
Harley Davidson and the Marlboro Man opened in North America on August 23, 1991, through MGM. It debuted in seventh place, grossing just $2.2 for the weekend and $3.2 million for the full week, figures that trade magazine Variety summed up as "Marlboro Light". It ended its domestic run with a poor $7.4 million tally. According to Wincer, the film performed somewhat better in Europe and Japan. By April 1993, it was about $2 million short of breaking even, a lackluster result but nowhere near as bad as Rourke's previous film, Desperate Hours, or MGM's other August 1991 release, Delirious, which respectively were $8 and $16 million in the red.

=== Home media ===
Harley Davidson and the Marlboro Man arrived on domestic VHS, Betamax, and LaserDisc on February 19, 1992, through MGM/UA Home Entertainment. According to Video Magazine, the film was also issued in the little used Video8 format. The tape reached 5th place in Variety's video rental charts, and 8th place in the Billboard equivalent. It was the 85th best renting tape of the year according to Billboard. It was released to DVD by MGM Home Entertainment on February 20, 2001, and on Blu-Ray by Shout! Factory (under license from MGM) on May 19, 2015.

== Reception ==
On review aggregator Rotten Tomatoes, 27% of 22 critics gave the film a positive review. On Metacritic the film has a weighted average score of 36% based on reviews from 24 critics, indicating "generally unfavorable" reviews. Audiences surveyed by CinemaScore gave the film a grade of "B" on a scale of A+ to F.

=== Contemporary ===
Initial reception was mostly negative. Harley Davidson has sometimes been compared to two other critically neglected films from the era, Road House, for its tough guy archetypes, and Streets of Fire, for its use of nostalgic outlaw figures in an ambiguous time setting.

Kevin Thomas of the Los Angeles Times called the film "a mindless cobbling from countless buddy movies". While he granted that "this does not mean its makers do not know what they’re doing", he deemed that "Rourke and Johnson are worthy of better, as is Australian director Simon Wincer". Vincent Canby of The New York Times concurred, writing, "Mr. Rourke and Mr. Johnson handle their roles with more ease and humor than can be accommodated by a movie so stuffed with mindless fistfights, gunfights, helicopter chases, explosions and leaps from tall buildings." Carrie Rickey of The Philadelphia Inquirer wrote, "The kindest that can be said about this peculiar film set in 1996 Los Angeles is that for the first time in recent memory, both Rourke and Johnson do something on screen other than behave debauched. They both do something that resembles acting." Ed Blank of The Pittsburgh Press did not find the near-future setting well realized, merely allowing the film to be "elegiac in an end-of-an-era sense, like Butch Cassidy and the Sundance Kid glorifying an earlier period of nomadic cowboys", while the Crystal Dream drug remained a "formula plot", resulting in a movie that "moves along but without a whit of credibility".

Mark Caro of the Chicago Tribune granted that the opening "immediately fuels the worst suspicions" about its machismo, but was pleasantly surprised by a "relaxed and likeable" Johnson, while Rourke's character "is enough of a knucklehead to deflate his posturing." He concluded, "By all means, this material should be far more insufferable and less entertaining than it is." Betsy Sherman of The Boston Globe deemed that the film "would have been better if Don Michael Paul had supplied some fresh dialogue", and only offered "momentary, tongue-in-cheek flirtations with sensitivity, but Rourke and Johnson make the most of them before getting down-and-dirty for the butt-kicking scenes", resulting in a movie that "for the most part is a rowdy good time." Philip Wuntch of the Dallas Morning News found fault with the film's similarities to Butch Cassidy and Rourke's "drowsy eyed" performance, but was relieved to find that "Johnson can carry more than his share of the movie" and judged it "engaging in its shuffling, shaggy-dog way. It just wants to show you a good time, and more often than not, it does". Joe Leydon of the Houston Post, however, praised "Rourke's engaging performance, easily his best movie work since Barfly." He also complimented Johnson's "appealingly loose and amusingly quick-tempered" Marlboro, and summed up the movie as "a high-testosterone action-adventure with a B-movie swagger and a self-mocking grin."

On their TV show Siskel & Ebert, Gene Siskel gave the film a thumbs up, while Roger Ebert did not, expressing disbelief that his colleague could prefer it to Rourke's more artistic Barfly. Owen Gleiberman of Entertainment Weekly rated it C+ and called it "a kinetic formula shoot-'em-up" that is "engagingly junky entertainment with a healthy sense of its own ludicrousness." Variety called it "a dopey, almost poignantly bad actioner about two legends-in-their-own-minds", whose achievement lied "mainly in the second unit and stunt department, with hotly staged bike chases and an abundance of breaking glass, falling bodies and shoot-outs, and the production design is an asset." Mark Kermode of Time Out London noted that "this disastrous modern Western veers between camp pastiche and pofaced machismo", while Rourke and Johnson "make a ludicrously vain double act". Writing in the British Film Institute's Sight and Sound magazine, Kim Newman felt that the film's premise required a hard-edged director like Walter Hill or John Milius rather than the "usually humane Simon Wincer", as a "deadening major-studio gloss dresses up the sleaze with too much budget", while the "stars lazily [crib] from their own images" en route to "a lazily feelgood finale".

==== Accolades ====
The film was nominated for Worst Picture at the 1991 Stinkers Bad Movie Awards.

=== Retrospective ===
==== Motorcycling community ====
The film has become a popular item in biking circles. In the 1994 book Races, Chases & Crashes, motor film collector and distributor Ron Main named it on a list of his fifteen favorite films of the genre, praising Johnson's performance. Motorcycle.com also mentioned the film in its 2021 list of the best motorcycle films. In a 2025 retrospective of the ten best pictures featuring Harley-Davidson bikes, Jalopnik called it "a film that almost defies description" and "one of the coolest (and sadly, most overlooked) movies of the early 1990s." In a 2025 article, motorcyling personality Corinna Mantlo wrote, "Decades later, the film has found a cult following for its portrayal of archetypal American symbols of rebellion and masculinity, represented by the titular characters 'Harley Davidson' (a biker) and 'the Marlboro Man' (a cowboy), two rugged individuals fighting against corporate power, while simultaneously critiquing the superficiality and potentially dangerous connotations of such idealized identities." International broadcaster Deutsche Welle also noted that it had achieved "cult status" thanks to the prominence of the Harley-Davidson bike.

==== Film critics ====
Among mainstream reviewers, the film's perception has improved marginally, with more credit given to its offbeat touches, while disagreements remain over their interplay with the more traditional action elements. On a special episode of Siskel & Ebert, Gene Siskel selected the film as one of his "guilty pleasures", saying, "Sometimes, when two big stars are not in a smash hit, the picture really gets smacked around by the press, but I thought that Harley Davidson and the Marlboro Man was really sweet and I recommend it." Aaron Beierle of DVDTalk granted that it "does boast some decently done action sequences and a few mildly exciting chases", but found Johnson "dissapointing [sic] in that he adds hardly anything of interest himself. Daniel Baldwin doesn't do much better as the villian [sic], although the usually good Tom Sizemore does his best as the other bad guy". He concluded, "I'm suprised [sic] that there seems to be a good deal of followers of this film". While praising the depth of the supporting cast, veteran British critic Derek Winnert assessed, "It is meant to be macho with a heart and a smile, but there is little evidence of the latter two virtues." Jeffrey Kauffman of Blu-ray.com deemed it an "odd but still occasionally appealing reboot of certain Western tropes". He added, "There's some of the same insouciance that informed [Wincer's Quigley Down Under] here in this outing, but it's often amped up to near cartoonish levels, especially in some of the action scenes which play almost like live action Chuck Jones sequences. That's not necessarily a bad thing, but it tends to remove any real sense of tension or suspense from the proceedings."

Chuck Bowen of the liberal Slant Magazine lauded the film's "parody of white, American male exceptionalism, understanding it to be a branding tool used by corporations for dressing garden-variety consumerism". He deemed it "a promising, poignant subject for an action movie", also calling the bar's foreclosure a "prescient" representation of corporate gentrification. However, he regretted that "parody, of course, is ultimately utilized by the filmmakers as a not-so-insidious excuse to revel in behaviors that are typically celebrated by action films anyway". Scott Tobias of The Dissolve assessed, "Part of what’s made this middling action movie so durable—besides its ready-made 'Movies For Guys Who Like Movies' template—is how endearingly uncool Harley and Marlboro are, as a biker and a cowboy who don’t really belong to any particular time and place." However, he noted that it "pits two self-styled rebels against corporate interests, but names them Harley Davidson and the Marlboro Man, in tribute to the companies responsible for their cool-guy image."

== Soundtrack ==
=== Original score ===
The original score was composed by Basil Poledouris, a favorite of Wincer's who returned from Lonesome Dove and Quigley Down Under. It has not been released commercially.

=== Soundtrack album ===
Harley Davidson and the Marlboro Man

Soundtrack album by various artists
- Released: September 3, 1991
- Genres: Rock, Hard rock
- Length: 42:46
- Label: Mercury Records

No.	Title	Writer(s)	Performer	Length
1.	"Long Way from Home"	Loyd Neil Carswell	Copperhead	7:15
2.	"The Bigger They Come"	Frampton, Marriott, John Regan	Peter Frampton, Steve Marriott	4:26
3.	"Tower of Love" (from the album Roadhouse, 1991)	Paul Jackson, Richard Day, Frank Noon	Roadhouse	3:56
4.	"I Mess Around" (from the album Shooting Gallery, 1991)	Billy G. Bang, Andy McCoy	Shooting Gallery	4:19
5.	"Wild Obsession" (from the album Hollywood Vampires, 1991)	Mick Cripps, Tracii Guns, Phil Lewis, Kelly Nickels, Steve Riley	L.A. Guns	4:14
6.	"C'mon" (from the album All for One, 1991)	Dave Gleeson, Richard Lara	The Screaming Jets	2:48
7.	"Let's Work Together"	Wilbert Harrison	The Kentucky Headhunters	2:14
8.	"Hardline"	Tom Kimmel, Dennis Morgan	Waylon Jennings	4:09
9.	"Ride with Me"	Dean Davidson	Blackeyed Susan	5:10
10.	"What Will I Tell My Heart?" (from the album The Comfort Zone, 1991)	Peter Tinturin, Irving Gordon, Jack Lawrence	Vanessa Williams	4:15
Total length:				42:46

The soundtrack was produced by Mercury Records, to whom Vanessa Williams was signed. "What Will I Tell My Heart?" was made famous by Dinah Washington. Two other songs by Williams are briefly heard in the film but omitted from the soundtrack album: a cover of The Isley Brothers' "Work to Do" and "The Better Part of Me", originally performed by Jaki Graham. She was originally announced to have recorded a fourth song for the film.

Fellow Mercury artists The Kentucky Headhunters contributed "Let's Work Together", a cover of a Wilbert Harrison classic. The song was made into a music video, which features excerpts from the film and pseudo-live footage shot over several takes just before their August 5, 1991, concert at the Buffalo Chip Campground during the Sturgis Motorcycle Rally. The song "Long Way from Home" by Copperhead had been written three years earlier. A demo came across Mercury executive Mary Reynolds, who put it on the film's soundtrack. This led to a full contract with the label.

Although Steve Marriott and Peter Frampton were already working towards a reunion, the recording of "The Bigger They Come" was commissioned especially for the film. It is recognized as the final collaboration between Marriott—who died shortly after—and his former Humble Pie colleague, while some have named it as Marriott's final release outright. Other songs heard in the film, but not included on the album are "Stop the World" by The Screaming Jets and "Wanted Dead or Alive" by Bon Jovi.

== "Black Death" chopper ==
=== Original bike ===
Rourke rode his own motorcycle in the film, which he had originally intended to use on his passion project, The Ride. When hired for this film, he told the producers that he already owned an adequate bike. The Harley-Davidson FXRS, modded by a team led by Gene Thomason at Bartels' Harley-Davidson of Culver City, was called Black Death 3, and so named because it came after two abandoned prototypes also made by Bartels. It was developed over a period of two years. Rourke toyed with various mods like digital indicators, which were a novelty at the time, before rolling them back. Between those versions, Rourke also heard pitches from another famed builder, Billy Westbrook, which led to the misconception that Westbrook had designed Black Death, although this is incorrect.

Among many changes from the stock version, Black Death 3's frame was raked and the original 80ci Evolution engine was upgraded to 98ci thanks to an S&S performance kit. New tanks were added, which were Softail models welded together. The rear suspension was stripped down, lowering the bike by two inches, while making it very uncomfortable to ride. It also received custom exhaust pipes from RB Racing, which were popular among celebrity riders at the time. They were going to be very large and chrome-plated to enhance the bike's poster appeal, before a more subdued look was chosen. Rourke's livery, which was originally predominantly white, was also pared down to raw metal to match the film's tone. The tank art was designed by the actor and painted by an acquaintance, whose name he has kept secret. It consists of playing cards associated with the dead man's hand, each bearing the initials of a deceased loved one.

After the bike sat unused in Rourke's garage for an extended period of time, he let his friend and bodyguard Chuck Zito have it. In 1999, Zito was involved in a crash while riding it in New York City. By 2023, Rourke had recovered the bike, and decided to give it away to a family friend, who had promised to preserve it. In 2025, the actor announced that the bike was up for sale.

=== Stunt bike ===
While Rourke's personal bike was used for glamour shots, MGM commissioned Bartels to build a duplicate, which is the one most frequently seen in the movie. That version kept the Evolution 80ci engine, with some slight modifications, as it was believed that it would better withstand the repetition of filming. Other minor differences could be found, most notably in the forward controls. In 1995, the stunt bike was bought back from MGM by Bartels assembler Gene Thomason, who then sold it to a Denver collector. It was later acquired by the president of Loess Harley Davidson, a Pacific Junction, Iowa, dealership. This example has periodically been exhibited at the Sturgis Motorcycle Museum & Hall of Fame.

=== Replicas ===
According to a 1997 Easyriders column, recreations of Rourke's bike had become some of the most requested in the custom chopper community. The actor partnered with Chuck Zito to produce replicas aimed at the general public, under the now discontinued brand Black Death Motorcycles. These were modded by Arizona-based Carefree Custom Cycles, and outfitted with 114in Mid-USA Powerhouse engines. They retailed for $35,000. A second model called Black Death Evolution was also announced. Since then, Pennsylvania workshop Death Row Motorcycles has advertised a build assist program for Black Death replicas.

== Aftermath ==
Rourke kept working on his biker drama The Ride during and after the making of Harley Davidson. The project went through several writers, but its uneasy development became public when Mark Geldman and Ron Yanover, a screenwriting duo hired in summer 1991, accused the actor of confrontational behavior and missed payments. It was ultimately not made (a later Rourke film, F.T.W., was retitled The Last Ride on video but has a wholly different story). In a 1993 interview, Rourke attributed his subsequent hiatus to his hatred for the film, which "made me feel [expletive] about myself and acting. I just needed to stop for a while." His opinion has changed little over the years, as he declared in 2016 that his involvement with it made him feel "like a whore".

Don Michael Paul's second film for MGM was to be a biopic of gangster John Dillinger tentatively called The Desperadoes, but it was not produced. The title of Paul's planned memoir, Dead and Cool: Villains, Obsessions & Starlets, is inspired by a line of Harley Davidson's dialogue. In a 1997 career interview, Wincer declared, "I suppose the film that I have the most regrets about is Harley Davidson and the Marlboro Man, yet it keeps popping up as one of those movies that people enjoy as a guilty pleasure." However, he stated that he did not regret making the film altogether.

== In popular culture ==
A recreation of Rourke's "Black Death" bike was featured on a 2014 episode of the History Channel reality series Counting Cars. The Bike Shed, a London social club for motorcyclists, used to offer a cocktail named after the movie. When German photographer Dieter Blum was approached by Marlboro to explore an advertising collaboration, one of the test images he shot in 1992 was called Cowboy, Horses & Harley and featured a Marlboro Man type next to a Harley Davidson bike. Although the inspiration was not directly acknowledged, the curators of an exhibition dedicated to those sessions have noted that they took place in the wake of the film's release.
