= Three Kids Mine =

Defunct mine in Henderson, Nevada, U.S.

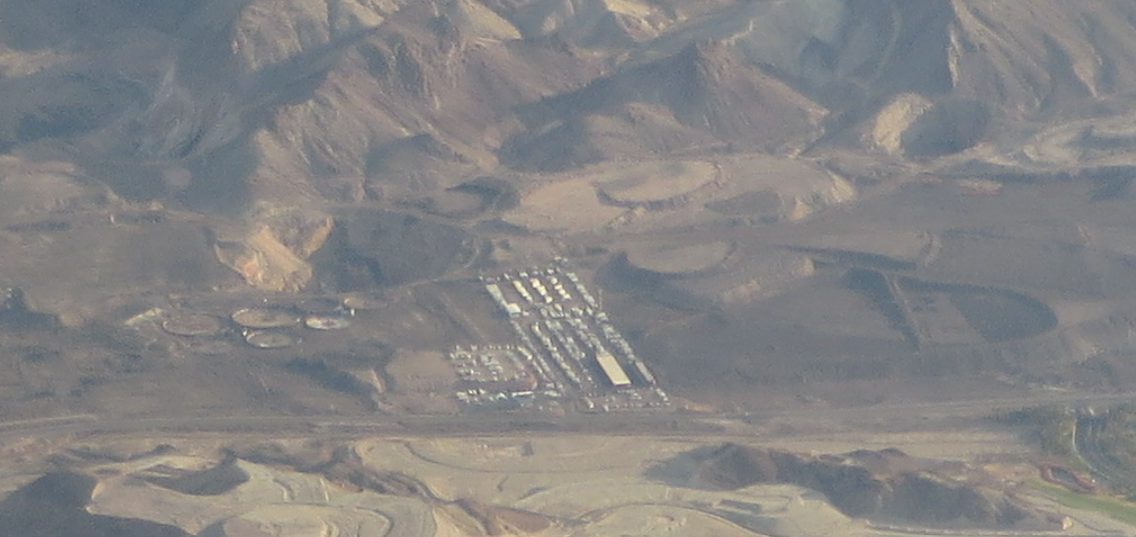
- Three Kids Mine viewed from the north in 2014

- Location in Nevada
- Location: Henderson, Nevada, U.S., , 36.08248°N 114.91388°W
- Products: Manganese
- Type: Open-pit
- Greatest depth: Roughly 300 feet (91 m)
- Opened: 1917
- Active: 1917—1961
- Closed: 1961
- Company: City of Henderson
- Acquired: 2014

The Three Kids Mine is a defunct open-pit manganese mine in Henderson, Nevada, United States which operated from 1917 to 1961, primarily supplying the United States military with manganese during the first and second World Wars. The now-abandoned mine—located near Nevada State Route 564 just south of the Lake Las Vegas neighborhood—popularly stands used as a location for graffiti art. On July 9, 2014, the Three Kids Mine Remediation and Reclamation Act (H.R. 697) was passed, which would lead to the cleanup of the former mine site and capping of the pit, starting in 2024. Construction of a residential development consisting of 3,000 homes as well as a park is slated to begin at the site in 2025.

== History ==
=== Operations ===
In 1917, three men—B.R. Jefferson, B. Edwards, and J. Marrs—discovered a manganese deposit with a high concentration of 20% to 40%. Coinciding with World War I, open-pit mining operations began at the mine the same year, supplying the United States military with manganese for military equipment such as steel combat helmets. As the war ended in 1918, demand for manganese decreased significantly and the mine remained almost dormant for two decades until World War II reignited the demand for the component. A mill for processing manganese at the site of the mine was constructed in 1942 to help meet the demand for the ore. However, the decline in war activity in the following years once again resulted in limited activity from the mine and the mill was closed in 1944. Mass-production from the mine restarted in 1951 when the on-site mill was remodeled and reopened. Production of manganese at the site continued for a decade until the pits were exhausted and the Three Kids Mine subsequently closed permanently in 1961. The remaining lead and manganese reserves were sold over the following years and parcels of land from the property were sold and redeveloped in the 1980s.

=== Reclamation and redevelopment of the mine ===
On February 13, 2013, Rep. Joe Heck (R-NV) introduced the Three Kids Mine Remediation and Reclamation Act (H.R. 697), which would direct the United States Department of the Interior to convey 948 specified acres of federal land at the Three Kids Mine site to the Henderson Redevelopment Agency of Henderson, Nevada for environmental remediation and mine reclamation. The bill was passed by the House of Representatives on July 22, 2013. The bill was received by the Senate and was passed by unanimous consent on July 9, 2014. President Barack Obama signed the bill into law on July 25, 2014.

On November 21, 2023, the Henderson City Council voted 4–0 to approve the proposal for Pulte Homes to build 3,000 homes on the mine site with a park capping the pits. The site's soil, which was contaminated with the residues of manganese as well as lead, arsenic, and petroleum identified in a 2007 environmental site assessment, would be used to fill the pits, with a liner trapping the impacted soil and unimpacted native soil topping the liner. Cleanup of the site, which involves removing the contaminating asbestos and tailings, began in May 2024 and is slated to continue to 2026, while construction of the residential development above the unimpacted areas at the former mine site is planned to start by the end of 2025.

== Graffiti ==
The thickener pits of the mill at the abandoned Three Kids Mine site remain painted with graffiti, the most notable artwork being the Wheel of Misfortune. Created in 2012 by an artist known by the alias Aware of the collective Indecline—who breached security over the span of three days to complete the artwork, the mural resembles a prize wheel reminiscent of one from the game show Wheel of Fortune, with "prizes" listed on the wheel including "$000", "Lose a Home", "Lose a Job", and "Lose All Hope". The mural was cleaned and resprayed in 2023.

== In popular culture ==
A pit at the Three Kids Mine was used for filming in 1988 science-fiction film Cherry 2000.
