= List of Metro-Goldwyn-Mayer films (2020–2029) =

The following is a list of films originally produced and/or distributed theatrically or digitally by Metro-Goldwyn-Mayer and released (or scheduled to be released) in the 2020s.

- A † signifies a premium video on demand release.
- A ‡ signifies a direct-to-video release or streaming release exclusively through Amazon Prime Video or MGM+.
- A § signifies a simultaneous release to theaters and on Amazon Prime Video.
- A * signifies a streaming release through a third-party streaming service.

== Released ==
Release date	Title	Co-production with	Distributor	Notes
July 9, 2020	Semper Fi	Concourse Media, Sparkhouse and Rumble Films	MGM	distribution in Germany, Austria, Switzerland, Latin America, Portugal, Greece, India and pan-Asian pay television only
November 18, 2020	Little Women	Pinnacle Peak Pictures, Main Dog Productions and Paulist Productions	MGM	distribution in Greece, Switzerland, Italy, Portugal, India, Japan and pan-Asian television only
April 8, 2021	Relic	Screen Australia, Film Victoria, Gozie AGBO, Carver Films and Nine Stories Productions	MGM	Latin American, Greek, Portuguese, Indian and airline distribution only
May 7, 2021	Wrath of Man	Miramax and Toff Guy Films	United Artists Releasing	U.S, Latin American, Scandinavian, Filipino and Hong Kong distribution only
July 23, 2021	Snake Eyes	Skydance Media, Entertainment One, Hasbro Studios and Di Bonaventura Pictures	Paramount Pictures	Co-financing
August 13, 2021	Respect	Bron Studios, Creative Wealth Media Finance, Glickmania and One Community	United Artists Releasing	most international distribution by Universal Pictures
August 19, 2021	Queen Bees	Astute Films	MGM	distribution in the U.K., Ireland, Germany, Austria, Switzerland, Italy, the Nordics, the Middle East, Greece, Portugal, Portuguese-speaking Africa, the CIS, India, South Africa, pan-Asian pay television, the Caribbean Basin and Latin America only
August 20, 2021	Flag Day	Conqueror Productions, Rocket Science and Olive Hill Media	United Artists Releasing	North American distribution only
August 27, 2021	Candyman	Bron Studios, Creative Wealth Media Finance and Monkeypaw Productions	Universal Pictures	Co-financing and distribution in Italy, Scandinavia, Portugal, Poland, Hungary, Romania, Bulgaria, Czech Republic, Slovakia, the Middle East, Israel and South Africa
October 1, 2021	The Addams Family 2	Bron Animation, Creative Wealth Media Finance, The Jackal Group, Glickmania, Whalerock Industries and Cinesite Studios	United Artists Releasing	most international distribution by Universal Pictures
October 8, 2021	No Time to Die	Eon Productions	United Artists Releasing	most international distribution by Universal Pictures
November 24, 2021	House of Gucci	Bron Studios, Creative Wealth Media Finance and Scott Free Productions	United Artists Releasing	most international distribution by Universal Pictures
November 26, 2021	Licorice Pizza	Focus Features, Bron Studios, Creative Wealth Media Finance and Ghoulardi Film Company	United Artists Releasing	most international distribution by Universal Pictures
February 18, 2022	Dog	Free Association and FilmNation Entertainment	United Artists Releasing	U.S. distribution only
February 25, 2022	Cyrano	Bron Studios, Creative Wealth Media Finance and Working Title Films	United Artists Releasing	most international distribution by Universal Pictures
July 29, 2022	Thirteen Lives §	Imagine Entertainment, Bron Creative, Magnolia Mae Films and Storyteller Productions	Amazon Studios	
August 26, 2022	Samaritan ‡	Balboa Productions	Amazon Studios	Prime Video exclusive
August 26, 2022	Three Thousand Years of Longing	FilmNation Entertainment, Elevate Production Finance, Sunac Pictures and Kennedy Miller Mitchell	United Artists Releasing	North American distribution only
November 23, 2022	Bones and All	Frensy Film Company, Per Capita Productions, The Apartment Pictures, Memo Films, 3 Marys Entertainment, Tenderstories, Ela Film, Immobiliare Manila, Serfis, Wise Pictures and Vision Distribution	United Artists Releasing	distribution outside Italy only; international distribution outside Scandinavia by Warner Bros. Pictures; final MGM release distributed by UAR before it was shut down by Amazon
March 3, 2023	Creed III	Balboa Productions, Glickmania, Chartoff Productions, Winkler Films and Proximity Media	MGM Distribution Co.	international distribution outside Scandinavia by Warner Bros. Pictures
March 24, 2023	A Good Person	Killer Films, Rocket Science and Elevation Pictures	MGM Distribution Co.	North American and select international distribution only
April 7, 2023	On a Wing and a Prayer ‡	Lightworkers Media	Amazon Studios	Prime Video exclusive
April 21, 2023	Guy Ritchie's The Covenant	STXfilms and Toff Guy Films	MGM Distribution Co.	U.S. distribution only
June 20, 2023	Surrounded †	3.16 Productions, Blackhand Media Production, Bron Studios, Creative Wealth Media, and Mandalay Pictures	MGM Distribution Co.	distribution only
August 18, 2023	Landscape with Invisible Hand	Annapurna Pictures and Plan B Entertainment	MGM Distribution Co.	
October 11, 2023	Dark Harvest	Matt Tolmach Productions	MGM Distribution Co.	Limited theatrical release through Alamo Drafthouse Cinemas before being released digitally; final film distributed solely by MGM.
December 25, 2023	The Boys in the Boat	Smokehouse Pictures, Tempesta Films and Anonymous Content	Amazon MGM Studios	select international distribution by Warner Bros. Pictures
January 12, 2024	The Beekeeper	Miramax, Cedar Park Entertainment and Punch Palace Productions	Amazon MGM Studios	U.S. and select international distribution only
January 26, 2024	The Underdoggs ‡	Death Row Pictures and Khalabo Ink Society	Amazon MGM Studios	Prime Video exclusive
March 21, 2024	Road House ‡	Silver Pictures	Amazon MGM Studios	Prime Video exclusive
April 26, 2024	Challengers	Why Are You Acting? Productions, Frenesy Film Company and Pascal Pictures	Amazon MGM Studios	international distribution by Warner Bros. Pictures
August 23, 2024	Blink Twice	Free Association, Bruce Cohen Productions, This is Important, and Bold Choices	Amazon MGM Studios	international distribution by Warner Bros. Pictures
December 25, 2024	The Fire Inside	Pastel Productions	Amazon MGM Studios	
December 10, 2025	Merv ‡	Catchlight Studios, Lightworkers Media and Matt Baer Films	Amazon MGM Studios	Prime Video exclusive
January 23, 2026	Mercy	Atlas Entertainment, Bazelevs Company and Big Indie	Amazon MGM Studios	International distribution by Sony Pictures Releasing International
January 28, 2026	The Wrecking Crew ‡	6th & Idaho Productions and Hard J Productions	Amazon MGM Studios	Prime Video exclusive
March 20, 2026	Project Hail Mary	Lord Miller Productions, Pascal Pictures, and Open Invite Entertainment	Amazon MGM Studios	International distribution by Sony Pictures Releasing International
June 5, 2026	Masters of the Universe	Mattel Studios, Escape Artists, and Truenorth Productions	Amazon MGM Studios	International distribution by Sony Pictures Releasing International
November 6, 2026	I Play Rocky	FilmNation Entertainment, Baha Productions, Eden Rock Media and Fireside Films	Amazon MGM Studios	U.S. distribution only

== Upcoming ==
Release date	Title	Notes	Production status
January 15, 2027	The Beekeeper 2	distribution outside the Middle East, Greece, Cyprus, Asia excluding India, and Germany and Austria excluding streaming only; produced by Miramax, Punch Palace Productions and Long Shot Productions	Completed
March 5, 2027	The Thomas Crown Affair	co-production with Atlas Entertainment and Outlier Society	Completed
April 23, 2027	Spaceballs: The New One	co-production with Brooksfilms and Imagine Entertainment	Post-production
December 25, 2027	Alone at Dawn	co-production with Imagine Entertainment, The Hideaway Entertainment and Thruline Entertainment	Completed

=== Undated films ===
Release date	Title	Notes	Production status
2027	Road House 2	co-production with Atlas Entertainment, Silver Pictures and Nine Stories Productions	Filming

=== In development ===
Title	Notes
'68	co-production with MACRO
Animal	co-production with Plan B Entertainment
Eleanor Oliphant Is Completely Fine	co-production with Hello Sunshine
Fever	co-production with Marc Platt Productions, Hello Sunshine and Killer Films
Forever	co-production with Miramax and Somewhere Pictures
I Am Pilgrim	co-production with Marv Studios and Whalerock Industries
Legally Blonde 3	co-production with Marc Platt Productions and Hello Sunshine
Mercy Sparx	co-production with Assemble Media, The Picture Company and Devil's Due Publishing
Poltergeist	co-production with Ghost House Pictures and AGBO
Polly Pocket	co-production with Mattel Studios and Good Thing Going
Tomb Raider	co-production with dj2 Entertainment and Crystal Dynamics
Untitled Chitty Chitty Bang Bang remake	co-production with Eon Productions
Untitled The Pink Panther reboot	co-production with Geoffrey Productions and Rideback
Untitled 26th James Bond film	co-production with Pascal Pictures and Heyday Films
Wild Symphony	co-production with Weed Road Pictures

== See also ==
- Lists of Metro-Goldwyn-Mayer films
- List of Amazon MGM Studios films
