= Bombshell (1997 film) =

- Directed by: Paul Wynne
- Written by: Paul Wynne
- Produced by: Wyatt Knight; Steven Paul; Patrick Peach; Vicky Pike; Jeff Ritchie; Paul Wynne
- Starring: Henry Thomas; Mädchen Amick; Frank Whaley; Pamela Gidley; Brion James; Michael Jace; Martin Hewitt
- Cinematography: Angel Colmenares
- Edited by: Christopher Roth; Joan Zapata
- Music by: Ennio Di Berardo
- Production companies: Molecular Films; Wynne/Pike Productions
- Distributed by: Crystal Sky Worldwide; Spentzos Film Home Video; Trimark Pictures
- Release date: December 30, 1997
- Running time: 94 minutes
- Country: United States
- Language: English

Bombshell is a sci-fi/thriller film written and directed by Paul Wynne, and starring Henry Thomas, Mädchen Amick, Frank Whaley, Pamela Gidley, and Brion James. It is produced by Wyatt Knight, Steven Paul, Patrick Peach, Vicky Pike, Jeff Ritchie, and Paul Wynne (himself). The production company is Molecular Films and Wynne/Pike Productions.

== Plot ==
In the year 2011, a sophisticated Los Angeles Company, Nanolabs, prepares to advertise a cancer cure in the form of nano-engines, microscopic molecular machines which mutate and restore organic tissue cell by cell. Genius Buck Hogan (Henry Thomas) starts to have serious doubts when lab animals start to die. Profit-greedy CEO Donald (Brion James) ignores him and devises human tests and news conferences.

The same night, a strange-looking masked figure traps and anesthetizes Hogan. When Hogan awakens, he learns one of his kidneys has been expertly replaced with a biodegradable sac that according to later publications, holds corrosive acid. The masked man promises Hogan an antidote only if he complies in picking up and delivering three packages. When the departmental LAPD refuses to help, and Hogan's fiancée Angeline (Mädchen Amick) is abducted, Hogan rips open a package and discovers it is empty. Hogan realizes that the courier act was a ruse to cause him to touch boxes coated with nano-engines, which penetrate his skin and are reacting with the sac. Hogan traces the potential culprit, fellow employee and career rival Malcolm Garvey (Frank Whaley), who forces the couple into Nanolabs at gunpoint during Donald's big press tour.

Revealing that the cancer cure is actually a carcinogen, Garvey also tells that the nano-engines inside Hogan have converted his implant into a destructive bomb. In the following panic, Garvey is shot dead and Angeline and Hogan remain in the building. Fortunately, Angeline happens to be a surgeon and executes an effective bomb-ectomy on the spot. They flee as the lab explodes, but Garvey's caution is lost in the pointless electronic media.

== Cast ==
- Henry Thomas as Buck Hogan
- Mädchen Amick as Angeline
- Frank Whaley as Malcolm Garvey
- Pamela Gidley as Melinda Clark
- Brion James as Donald
- Michael Jace as Detective Jefferson
- Martin Hewitt as Adam
- David Packer as Brad
- Shawnee Smith as Shelly
- Victoria Jackson as The Waitress
- David "Shark" Fralick as Buff
- Art Chudabala as Bewayne
- Carole White as Carol White
- James Dumont as Dr. Braunmann

== Production ==
Filming was taken place in Los Angeles, California. It was produced by Molecular Films and Wynne/Pike Productions. It was distributed by Crystal Sky Worldwide, Spentzos Film Home Video, and Trimark Pictures.

== Reception ==
Critical reception to the film has been negative. TV Guide wrote

While not quite a dud, BOMBSHELL never quite matches the level of its low-budget, but visually arresting, depiction of the 21st century.

Some praise went to the plot of the film "that the nano-engines ... assemble an explosive device inside Hogan's gut is a neat payoff; too bad Wynne couldn't think of a better way to get there (or escape from it)". However, criticism was directed to the running of the film: "The game is mostly up at the 70-minute mark, ... director Paul Wynne pads the remaining running time with a protracted car chase and ... fruitless attacks on shallow TV journalism."

Surprise praise was given to cinematographer Angel Colmenares ... BOMBSHELL is worth watching, if only for Angel Colmenares' snazzy cinematography, which paints the future-shock sets with electric colors and sometimes slips into time-lapse imagery."
