= Cherry 2000 =

1988 American science-fiction film

- Theatrical poster by Matthew Peak
- Directed by: Steve De Jarnatt
- Screenplay by: Michael Almereyda
- Story by: Lloyd Fonvielle
- Produced by: Edward R. Pressman; Caldecot Chubb
- Starring: Melanie Griffith; David Andrews; Tim Thomerson; Pamela Gidley
- Cinematography: Jacques Haitkin
- Edited by: Edward M. Abroms; Duwayne Dunham
- Music by: Basil Poledouris
- Distributed by: Orion Pictures
- Release date: February 1988
- Running time: 99 minutes
- Country: United States
- Language: English
- Budget: $10 million
- Box office: $14,000

Cherry 2000 is a 1988 American science fiction action film directed by Steve De Jarnatt, and starring David Andrews, Melanie Griffith, Tim Thomerson, and Pamela Gidley. It was produced by Edward R. Pressman and Caldecot Chubb. The screenplay was by Michael Almereyda. Critic reviews were generally mixed.

== Plot ==
In the year 2017, the United States has fragmented into post-apocalyptic wastelands with a few civilized areas. An ongoing economic crisis has led to the recycling of aging 20th-century mechanical and technological equipment. Society has also become averse to intimacy, as well as both increasingly hypersexualized and bureaucratic. Robotic technology has produced gynoids as substitutes for wives. The declining instances of actual sex among men and women is litigious, with one brothel having lawyers draft up contracts detailing the intended sexual rendezvous.

Recycling executive Sam Treadwell owns a Cherry 2000 model as his wife. After she short circuits during sex on a wet kitchen floor, Sam is told by a repairman that she is damaged beyond repair, though her rare and valuable memory disk, which contains her entire personality, can be used in a new body if the same model can be found. A gynoid dealer tells Sam that the Cherry 2000 model is no longer produced and that the only remaining ones are in a defunct warehouse in "Zone 7", a particularly dangerous, lawless area. With Cherry's memory disk stored in a device that plays back Cherry's voice, Sam hires Edith "E" Johnson, a tough tracker, to guide him to the factory. They set off in Edith's heavily modified 1965 Ford Mustang.

Entering Zone 7, they encounter Lester, a wasteland overlord with deranged subordinates. Edith and Sam take refuge in an underground reservoir occupied by Six-Fingered Jake, an elderly tracker who was Edith's mentor. When Lester's men attack, the three attempt to escape, but Sam is knocked unconscious and taken to a 1950s-styled motel/village. Ginger, one of Lester's gang, reveals herself as Sam's ex-girlfriend, previously known as Elaine. Lester decides to induct Sam into the group, and Sam, believing that Edith and Jake are dead, goes along for a while. When he witnesses the group sadistically murdering a tracker, Sam decides to escape and runs into Edith and Jake, still quite alive. Jake, who had earlier led Sam to believe that the Cherry 2000 memory disk had been lost, still has it and gives it to Edith while he stays behind to draw off Lester's gang.

Sam, a veteran of earlier wars, shows that he is a capable fighter, and Edith begins to have feelings for him. Sam's own growing feelings toward Edith, though, are derailed when he hears Cherry's voice accidentally play on the audio device. Continuing to work their way to the gynoid warehouse, they arrive at a brothel/gas station owned by Snappy Tom, a friend of Jake's, where a dilapidated Aeronca Champion light airplane is stored. Edith repairs the plane using parts from the Mustang. Jake catches up with the group and reminisces with Snappy Tom, but Snappy's live-in girlfriend betrays their location to Lester over the radio and shoots Jake in the back. Edith and Sam manage to escape in the plane.

Sam is almost ready to abandon the quest, but Edith is determined to complete her job as a tracker so Jake's death will not become meaningless. As they land, Zone 7 is revealed to be actually the abandoned ruins of Las Vegas and the gynoid "warehouse" is actually a casino. Sam finally finds a functional Cherry 2000 model and activates her with the memory disk; however, being programmed only for home life and sex, the robot is incapable of adapting to the current dangerous situation when Lester and his gang attack.

In an extended battle, Sam, Edith, and Cherry climb aboard the airplane, but their combined weight prevents takeoff. Edith jumps out so that Sam and the robot can escape, but Sam realizes that Cherry cannot provide the human interaction that he and Edith have had and turns the plane around. Cherry, programmed to fulfill Sam's wishes, offers to bring him a Pepsi, so he sends her away as he and Edith fight off Lester's gang and take off in the plane. When Lester tries to lasso the plane, he gets caught in the rope and hangs himself from one of the ancient Las Vegas neon casino signs. Edith and Sam kiss as they fly away into the sunset.

== Cast ==
- David Andrews as Sam Treadwell
- Melanie Griffith as Edith "E" Johnson
- Tim Thomerson as Lester
- Pamela Gidley as Cherry, a Cherry 2000 model
- Harry Carey Jr. as Tom "Snappy Tom"
- Jennifer Mayo as Randa, Snappy Tom's Girlfriend
- Ben Johnson as Jake "Six-Fingered Jake"
- Brion James as Stacy
- Marshall Bell as Bill
- Laurence Fishburne (credited as Larry Fishburne) as Glu Glu Lawyer
- Michael C. Gwynne as "Slim"
- Jack Thibeau as Stubby Man
- Robert Zdar as Chet
- Jennifer Balgobin as Glory Hole Clerk
- Cameron Milzer as Elaine / Ginger

== Location ==
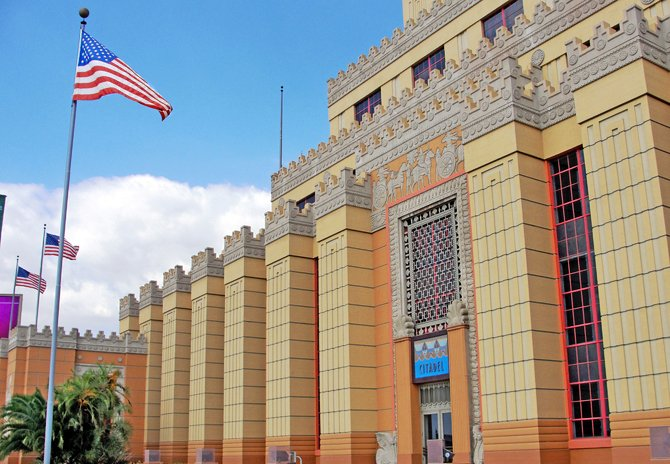
The Citadel building located in Commerce, California, was featured in the film.

According to the credits, the film was shot entirely in Nevada. The van plunging into an open pit was shot at Three Kids Mine. The river-crossing sequence was filmed at the Hoover Dam. Scenes at the Sky Ranch were filmed at the Beehive group camping area in the Valley of Fire State Park. E and Sam's first kiss was filmed in the upper reaches of the Las Vegas Wash. Adobe Flats was filmed at Eldorado Valley Dry Lake Bed. The town of Glory Hole was filmed in Goldfield, Nevada. The Integratron building in Landers, California, was used as the casino that was the "abandoned manufacturing plant" holding a rare copy of the outdated Cherry 2000 gynoid at the end of the film. The fortress-like building featured in the film is in Commerce, California, at the location of a former tire factory, which was renovated and transformed into the Citadel Outlet Mall.

== Release ==
After its completion in December 1985, Orion Pictures originally scheduled Cherry 2000 for a U.S. release on August 15, 1986. Sometime later, the date was postponed to March 1987, then September 1987. An article in The Times Leader commented on May 22, 1987, that the film had been "shelved since [1986], this western is set in the 21st century. Hope it opens by then." Joseph Gelmins wrote in Newsday that it was scheduled for September. In October 1987, The Palm Beach Post announced the film for release in February 1988.

Producer Edward R. Pressman confessed that Cherry 2000's combination of genres, styles, and themes stumped promoters at Orion, resulting in its repeated shelving. On discussing the delays of the film, Pressman stated that the film was a "tough sell" while the director Steve DeJarnatt stated "no one who's seen it hates it or anything" and that "It's also kind of a soft film. I don't think anyone really knows how to market it."

== Home media ==
Cherry 2000 was released on VHS in North America by Orion Home Video on November 17, 1988. A reviewer in Variety noted that the film had "gone fast to video after the briefest of theatrical screenings".

== Reception ==
The film holds a 38% approval rating on Rotten Tomatoes based on 21 reviews, with a weighted average of 4.24/10. The site's consensus reads: "While Cherry 2000 has a certain low-budget appeal, all but the most ardent genre enthusiasts are likely to find its silly story and uneven performances unintentionally amusing". Among contemporary reviews, the 1988 Variety's Film Reviews regarded Melanie Griffith as the film's greatest asset, who "lifts the material whenever she's on screen", and described the production as "quite lavish and the Nevada locations suitably rugged. Production design by John J. Moore is a major plus."

== See also ==
- List of American films of 1988
