= List of Metro-Goldwyn-Mayer films (2000–2009) =

The following is a list of films originally produced and/or distributed theatrically by Metro-Goldwyn-Mayer and released in the 2000s.

== 2000 ==
Release date	Title	Co-production with	Distributor	Notes
January 14, 2000	Supernova	Screenland Pictures and Hammerhead Productions	MGM Distribution Co. (United States and Canada); United International Pictures (International)	
March 1, 2000	3 Strikes	Absolute Entertainment, Motion Picture Corporation of America and Lithium Entertainment Group	MGM Distribution Co.	
April 7, 2000	Return to Me	JLT Productions	MGM Distribution Co. (United States and Canada); United International Pictures (International)	
August 11, 2000	Autumn in New York	Lakeshore Entertainment	MGM Distribution Co.	North American distribution only

== 2001 ==
Release date	Title	Co-production with	Distributor	Notes
January 12, 2001	Antitrust	Hyde Park Entertainment and Industry Entertainment	MGM Distribution Co. (United States and Canada); 20th Century Fox (Latin America, the U.K., Ireland, Australia, New Zealand and Asia excluding India); Epsilon Motion Pictures (Continental Europe); Nu Metro (South Africa); Forum Film (Israel); Almassa Art (Middle East); Sam Film (Iceland); Pinema (Turkey); Ashok Amritraj Entertainment (India)	
February 9, 2001	Hannibal	Universal Pictures, Dino De Laurentiis Company and Scott Free Productions	MGM Distribution Co. (United States and Canada); Filmauro (Italy); Tobis StudioCanal (Germany and Austria); GAGA-Humax (Japan); Monolith Films (Poland); InterCom (Hungary); Pyramid (CIS); Universal Pictures (International; through United International Pictures)	
March 23, 2001	Heartbreakers	Davis Entertainment	MGM Distribution Co. (United States and Canada); Winchester Films (International)	
April 11, 2001	Josie and the Pussycats	Marc Platt Productions and Riverdale Productions	Universal Pictures (United States and Canada); 20th Century Fox (International)	
April 20, 2001	The Whole Nine Yards	Franchise Pictures and Lansdown Films	20th Century Fox	Japanese distribution only
June 1, 2001	What's the Worst That Could Happen?	Turman/Morrisey Productions and Hyde Park Entertainment	MGM Distribution Co. (United States and Canada); 20th Century Fox (International)	
July 13, 2001	Legally Blonde	Marc Platt Productions	MGM Distribution Co. (United States and Canada); 20th Century Fox (International)	
August 3, 2001	Original Sin	Hyde Park Entertainment, Via Rosa Productions, Di Novi Pictures, Intermedia and UGC International	MGM Distribution Co. (United States and Canada); 20th Century Fox (Latin America, the U.K., Ireland, Australia, New Zealand and Asia excluding Japan and Korea); Epsilon Motion Pictures (Europe); Nu Metro (South Africa); Forum Film (Israel); Almassa Art (Middle East); Sam Film (Iceland); Pinema (Turkey); GAGA-Humax (Japan); Sinabro Entertainment (Korea)	
October 12, 2001	Bandits	Hyde Park Entertainment, Empire Pictures, Lotus Pictures, Baltimore/Spring Creek Pictures and Cheyenne Enterprises	MGM Distribution Co. (United States and Canada); 20th Century Fox (Latin America, the U.K., Ireland, Australia, New Zealand and Asia excluding India); Epsilon Motion Pictures (Continental Europe); Nu Metro (South Africa); Forum Film (Israel); Almassa Art (Middle East); Sam Film (Iceland); Pinema (Turkey); Ashok Amritraj Entertainment (India)	

== 2002 ==
Release date	Title	Co-production with	Distributor	Notes
February 8, 2002	Rollerball	Mosaic Media Group	MGM Distribution Co. (United States and Canada); Buena Vista International and Helkon Filmverleih (Germany and Austria); Eagle Pictures (Italy); Toho-Towa (Japan); Columbia Pictures (International; through Columbia TriStar Film Distributors International)	
February 15, 2002	Hart's War	David Ladd Films, David Foster Productions and Cheyenne Enterprises	MGM Distribution Co. (United States and Canada); GAGA-Humax (Japan); 20th Century Fox (International)	
June 14, 2002	Windtalkers	Lion Rock Productions	MGM Distribution Co. (United States and Canada); Pathé Distribution and President Films (France); 01 Distribution (Italy); 20th Century Fox (International)	
July 12, 2002	The Crocodile Hunter: Collision Course	The Best Picture Show Company and Cheyenne Enterprises	MGM Distribution Co. (United States and Canada); 20th Century Fox (International)	
September 13, 2002	Barbershop	State Street Pictures and Cube Vision	MGM Distribution Co. (United States and Canada); 20th Century Fox (International)	
October 4, 2002	Red Dragon	Dino De Laurentiis Company	Universal Pictures	studio credit only
November 22, 2002	Die Another Day	Eon Productions	MGM Distribution Co. (United States and Canada); 20th Century Fox (International)	

== 2003 ==
Release date	Title	Co-production with	Distributor	Notes
January 17, 2003	A Guy Thing	David Ladd Films	MGM Distribution Co. (United States and Canada); 20th Century Fox (International)	
March 14, 2003	Agent Cody Banks	Splendid Pictures, Maverick Films and Dylan Sellers Productions	MGM Distribution Co. (United States and Canada); Movie Eye (Japan); 20th Century Fox (International)	
April 16, 2003	Bulletproof Monk	Lakeshore Entertainment, Mosaic Media Group and Lion Rock Productions	MGM Distribution Co. (United States and Canada); UGC Fox Distribution (France)	North American and French distribution only
April 25, 2003	It Runs in the Family	Furthur Films	MGM Distribution Co. (United States and Canada); Buena Vista International (International)	
July 2, 2003	Legally Blonde 2: Red, White & Blonde	Marc Platt Productions and Type A Films	MGM Distribution Co. (United States and Canada); 20th Century Fox (International)	
August 15, 2003	Uptown Girls	GreeneStreet Films	MGM Distribution Co. (United States and Canada); 20th Century Fox (International)	
October 3, 2003	Out of Time	Original Film and Monarch Pictures	MGM Distribution Co. (United States and Canada); 20th Century Fox (Australia, New Zealand, South Africa, France and Asia excluding Japan, Indonesia and Thailand); Momentum Pictures (U.K. and Ireland); United International Pictures and Universum Film (Germany and Austria); Medusa Film (Italy); Buena Vista International (Spain); Sandrew Metronome (Scandinavia); Les Films de l'Elysée (Belgium); Moonlight Films (Netherlands); New Films International (Bulgaria, Romania and Turkey); SPI International (Poland, the Czech Republic, Slovakia and Hungary); Toshiba Entertainment (Japan); Paradise Group (CIS and Baltics); Sun Distribution (Latin America); Pris Audiovisuais (Portugal); Discovery Film & Video Distribution (former Yugoslavia and Albania)	
October 10, 2003	Good Boy!	Jim Henson Pictures	MGM Distribution Co. (United States and Canada); 20th Century Fox (International)	

== 2004 ==
Release date	Title	Co-production with	Distributor	Notes
February 6, 2004	Barbershop 2: Back in Business	State Street Pictures and Cube Vision	MGM Distribution Co. (United States and Canada); 20th Century Fox (International)	
March 12, 2004	Agent Cody Banks 2: Destination London	Splendid Pictures, Maverick Films and Dylan Sellers Productions	MGM Distribution Co. (United States and Canada); 20th Century Fox (International)	
April 2, 2004	Walking Tall	Hyde Park Entertainment, Mandeville Films, Burke/Samples/Foster Productions and WWE Films	MGM Distribution Co. (United States and Canada); Herald Film Company (Japan); Film Pop (Turkey); Paradise Group (CIS and Baltics); SPI International (Hungary); Bioscop (Czech Republic); AQS (Slovakia); Kino Swiat (Poland); Mongkol Major (Thailand); 20th Century Fox (International)	
May 28, 2004	Soul Plane	Turbo Productions	MGM Distribution Co. (Worldwide); Verve Pictures (U.K. and Ireland); Solo Filmverleih (Germany and Austria); Premium Cine (Spain)	
July 2, 2004	De-Lovely	Winkler Films	MGM Distribution Co. (United States and Canada); 20th Century Fox (International)	
July 9, 2004	Sleepover	Landscape Entertainment and Woodstock Productions	MGM Distribution Co. (Worldwide); Verve Pictures (U.K. and Ireland); Solo Filmverleih (Germany and Austria); Columbia TriStar Films (France)	
September 3, 2004	Wicker Park	Lakeshore Entertainment	MGM Distribution Co.	North American, French home media, Australian and New Zealand distribution only

== 2005 ==
Release date	Title	Co-production with	Distributor	Notes
March 4, 2005	Be Cool	Jersey Films and Double Feature Films	MGM Distribution Co. (United States and Canada); 20th Century Fox (International)	
March 30, 2005	Beauty Shop	State Street Pictures, Mandeville Films and Flavor Unit Films	MGM Distribution Co. (Worldwide); Verve Pictures (U.K. and Ireland); Gaumont Columbia TriStar Films (France)	
April 15, 2005	The Amityville Horror	Dimension Films, Platinum Dunes and Radar Pictures	MGM Distribution Co. (United States and Canada); 20th Century Fox (U.K., Ireland, Australia, New Zealand, France, Germany, Austria and Japan); Miramax International (International)	
August 26, 2005	The Brothers Grimm	Dimension Films, Mosaic Media Group and Atlas Entertainment	Miramax Films	studio credit and U.S. television distribution only
September 30, 2005	Into the Blue	Mandalay Pictures	Columbia Pictures (Worldwide television, home entertainment and North American theatrical rights; through Sony Pictures Releasing); 20th Century Fox (International theatrical rights)	
November 23, 2005	Yours, Mine and Ours	Paramount Pictures, Nickelodeon Movies and Robert Simonds Productions	Paramount Pictures (United States and Canada); Columbia Pictures (International; through Sony Pictures Releasing International)	

== 2006 ==
Release date	Title	Co-production with	Distributor	Notes
January 27, 2006	Nanny McPhee	StudioCanal, Working Title Films and Three Strange Angels	Universal Pictures (Worldwide); StudioCanal (France; through Mars Distribution); Eagle Pictures (Italy)	studio credit only
February 10, 2006	The Pink Panther	Robert Simonds Productions	Columbia Pictures (Worldwide television, home entertainment and North American theatrical rights; through Sony Pictures Releasing); 20th Century Fox (International theatrical rights)	
March 31, 2006	Basic Instinct 2	C2 Pictures, Intermedia Films and Kanzaman Productions (Note: Distribution rights co-owned by Resurgence Media Group)	Sony Pictures Releasing (North America); 20th Century Fox (Australia and New Zealand)	North American, Australian and New Zealand distribution only
April 7, 2006	Lucky Number Slevin	Ascendant Pictures, FilmEngine and Capitol Films (Note: Owned by Lionsgate)	The Weinstein Company; MGM Distribution Co.	U.S. theatrical distribution only
July 21, 2006	Clerks II	The Weinstein Company and View Askew Productions	MGM Distribution Co.	U.S. theatrical distribution only
August 18, 2006	Material Girls	Maverick Films, Rafter H Entertainment, Patriot Pictures, Milton Kim Productions, Concept Entertainment and Arclight Films	MGM Distribution Co.	North American distribution only
September 22, 2006	Flyboys	Electric Entertainment and Skydance Productions (Note: Owned by Electric Entertainment)	MGM Distribution Co.	North American, U.K., Irish, German, Austrian and Italian distribution only
September 29, 2006	School for Scoundrels	Dimension Films, Picked Last and Media Talent Group	The Weinstein Company; MGM Distribution Co.	U.S. theatrical distribution only
October 6, 2006	Alex Rider: Operation Stormbreaker	Isle of Man Film and Samuelson Productions	The Weinstein Company; MGM Distribution Co.	U.S. theatrical distribution only
November 10, 2006	Copying Beethoven	Sidney Kimmel Entertainment	MGM Distribution Co.	U.S. distribution only
November 10, 2006	Harsh Times	Crave Films	Bauer Martinez Entertainment; MGM Distribution Co.	U.S. theatrical and television distribution only
November 17, 2006	Casino Royale	Eon Productions	Columbia Pictures (theatrical and home entertainment rights; through Sony Pictures Releasing); MGM (television rights)	
November 17, 2006	Bobby	Bold Films (Note: Owned by Bold Films, with U.S. distribution rights licensed to Vertical)	The Weinstein Company; MGM Distribution Co.	U.S. theatrical distribution only
December 1, 2006	Van Wilder: The Rise of Taj	Tapestry Films and Myriad Pictures	Bauer Martinez Entertainment; MGM Distribution Co.	U.S. distribution only
December 15, 2006	Home of the Brave	Millennium Films	MGM Distribution Co.	North American distribution only
December 20, 2006	Rocky Balboa	Columbia Pictures, Revolution Studios, Chartoff Productions and Winkler Films	MGM Distribution Co. (United States and Canada theatrically); Svensk Filmindustri (Scandinavia); ZON Lusomundo (Portugal); Forum Film (Israel); 20th Century Fox (International)	
December 25, 2006	Black Christmas	2929 Entertainment, Adelstein-Parouse Productions, Hard Eight Pictures and Hoban Segal Productions	The Weinstein Company; Dimension Films; MGM Distribution Co.	U.S. theatrical distribution only
December 29, 2006	Miss Potter	Phoenix Pictures, BBC Films and Isle of Man Film	The Weinstein Company; MGM Distribution Co.	U.S. theatrical distribution only
December 29, 2006	Factory Girl	Myriad Pictures and Lift Productions	The Weinstein Company; MGM Distribution Co.	U.S. theatrical distribution only

== 2007 ==
Release date	Title	Co-production with	Distributor	Notes
January 12, 2007	Arthur and the Invisibles	EuropaCorp, Avalanche Productions, Apipoulaï Prod and Canal+ (Note: Owned by Lionsgate; the American cut however is out of print, having been replaced nearly worldwide with the original French cut, currently available only on the streaming service Disney+)	The Weinstein Company; MGM Distribution Co.	U.S. theatrical distribution only
January 26, 2007	Blood and Chocolate	Lakeshore Entertainment and Berrick Filmproduktion	MGM Distribution Co.	North American theatrical and television distribution only
February 9, 2007	Breaking and Entering	The Weinstein Company, Miramax Films and Mirage Enterprises	MGM Distribution Co.	U.S. theatrical distribution only
February 9, 2007	Hannibal Rising	Dino De Laurentiis Company, Carthago Films, Zephyr Films, Etic Films and Quinta Communications	The Weinstein Company; MGM Distribution Co.	U.S. theatrical distribution only
March 2, 2007	Two Weeks	Custom Productions	MGM Distribution Co.	distribution only
March 16, 2007	Premonition	Hyde Park Entertainment and Offspring Entertainment (Note: Owned by Sony Pictures)	TriStar Pictures (through Sony Pictures Releasing)	North American distribution only
May 4, 2007	The Flying Scotsman	ContentFilm International, Freewheel International, Scion Films, DNC Entertainment and Zero West Films	MGM Distribution Co.	distribution outside Italy, Scandinavia, Portugal and select other territories only
May 11, 2007	The Ex	2929 Entertainment and This is that	The Weinstein Company; MGM Distribution Co.	U.S. theatrical distribution only
June 1, 2007	Mr. Brooks	Element Films, Relativity Media, Eden Rock Media and Tig Productions	MGM Distribution Co.	U.S., U.K. and Irish distribution only
June 22, 2007	1408	Dimension Films and di Bonaventura Pictures	The Weinstein Company; MGM Distribution Co.	U.S. theatrical distribution only
July 4, 2007	Rescue Dawn	Top Gun Productions, Thema Productions and Gibraltar Films	MGM Distribution Co.	North American distribution only
July 27, 2007	Who's Your Caddy?	Dimension Films and Our Stories Films	The Weinstein Company; MGM Distribution Co.	U.S. theatrical distribution only
August 17, 2007	Death at a Funeral	Sidney Kimmel Entertainment, Parabolic Pictures and Stable Way Entertainment	MGM Distribution Co.	North American, U.K. and Irish distribution only
August 24, 2007	The Nanny Diaries	The Weinstein Company and FilmColony	MGM Distribution Co.	U.S. theatrical distribution only
August 31, 2007	Halloween	Dimension Films, Nightfall Productions and Trancas International	The Weinstein Company; MGM Distribution Co.	U.S. theatrical distribution only
September 14, 2007	The Hunting Party	Gran Via Productions, Intermedia Films and QED International	The Weinstein Company; MGM Distribution Co.	U.S. theatrical distribution only
September 28, 2007	Feast of Love	Lakeshore Entertainment, GreeneStreet Films and Revelations Entertainment	MGM Distribution Co.	North American distribution only
October 12, 2007	Lars and the Real Girl	Sidney Kimmel Entertainment	MGM Distribution Co.	U.S. and select international distribution only
October 26, 2007	Music Within	Articulus Entertainment and Quorum Entertainment	MGM Distribution Co.	North American distribution only
November 9, 2007	Lions for Lambs	United Artists, Wildwood Enterprises, Brat Na Pont and Andell Entertainment	MGM Distribution Co. (United States and Canada); 20th Century Fox (International)	
November 21, 2007	The Mist	Dimension Films and Darkwoods Productions	The Weinstein Company; MGM Distribution Co.	U.S. theatrical distribution only
November 30, 2007	Awake	The Weinstein Company and GreeneStreet Films	MGM Distribution Co.	U.S. theatrical distribution only
December 25, 2007	The Great Debaters	The Weinstein Company and Harpo Productions	MGM Distribution Co.	U.S. theatrical distribution only

== 2008 ==
Release date	Title	Co-production with	Distributor	Notes
February 22, 2008	Charlie Bartlett	Sidney Kimmel Entertainment, Everyman Pictures, Texon Entertainment and Permut Presentations	MGM Distribution Co.	U.S. and select international distribution only
March 28, 2008	Superhero Movie	Dimension Films	The Weinstein Company; MGM Distribution Co.	U.S. theatrical distribution only
April 18, 2008	Pathology	Lakeshore Entertainment and Camelot Pictures	MGM Distribution Co.	U.S. distribution only
April 25, 2008	Deal	Seven Arts Pictures and Tag Entertainment	MGM Distribution Co.	North American distribution only
August 15, 2008	Vicky Cristina Barcelona	Mediapro and Gravier Productions	The Weinstein Company; MGM Distribution Co.	U.S. theatrical distribution only
August 22, 2008	The Longshots	Dimension Films, Cube Vision and BlackJack Films	The Weinstein Company; MGM Distribution Co.	U.S. theatrical distribution only
August 29, 2008	College	Element Films and Lift Productions	MGM Distribution Co.	North American distribution only
September 19, 2008	Igor	Exodus Film Group and Sparx Animation Studios	MGM Distribution Co.	U.S. distribution only
October 3, 2008	How to Lose Friends & Alienate People	Pi Pictures, Intandem Films, Film4 Productions, Aramid Entertainment and Lipsync Productions	MGM Distribution Co.	North American distribution only
October 31, 2008	The Other End of the Line	Hyde Park Entertainment and Adlabs Films	MGM Distribution Co.	North American distribution only
November 7, 2008	Soul Men	Dimension Films and Friendly Films	The Weinstein Company; MGM Distribution Co.	U.S. theatrical distribution only
November 14, 2008	Quantum of Solace	Eon Productions	MGM (television and home entertainment rights); Columbia Pictures (theatrical rights; through Sony Pictures Releasing)	
December 25, 2008	Valkyrie	United Artists, Bad Hat Harry Productions, Cruise/Wagner Productions and Studio Babelsberg Motion Pictures	MGM Distribution Co. (United States and Canada); TFM Distribution (France); 01 Distribution (Italy); Wide Pictures (Spain); Toho-Towa (Japan); 20th Century Fox (International)	

== 2009 ==
Release date	Title	Co-production with	Distributor	Notes
February 6, 2009	The Pink Panther 2	Robert Simonds Productions	MGM (television and home entertainment rights); Columbia Pictures (theatrical rights; through Sony Pictures Releasing)	
March 4, 2009	12	Three T Productions	Sony Pictures Classics	Russian film; studio credit only
June 12, 2009	The Taking of Pelham 123	Columbia Pictures, Relativity Media, Scott Free Productions and Escape Artists	Sony Pictures Releasing	
September 25, 2009	Fame	Lakeshore Entertainment and United Artists (Note: MGM has since reclaimed international rights to Fame)	MGM Distribution Co. (United States and Canada); Lakeshore International (International)	

== See also ==
- Lists of Metro-Goldwyn-Mayer films
