= Three Kids Mine Remediation and Reclamation Act =

- Long title: To provide for the conveyance of certain Federal land in Clark County, Nevada, for the environmental remediation and reclamation of the Three Kids Mine Project Site, and for other purposes.
- Announced in: the 113th United States Congress
- Sponsored by: Rep. Joseph J. Heck (R, NV-3)
- Number of co-sponsors: 3

Citations
- Public law: Pub. L. 113–135 (text) (PDF)

Codification
- Acts affected: Comprehensive Environmental Response, Compensation, and Liability Act of 1980, Federal Land Policy and Management Act of 1976, Southern Nevada Public Land Management Act of 1998
- U.S.C. sections affected: 42 U.S.C. § 9601, 43 U.S.C. § 1712, 43 U.S.C. § 1713, 43 U.S.C. § 1717, 31 U.S.C. § 6901(note)
- Agencies affected: United States Department of the Interior, United States Bureau of Reclamation,

[H.R. 697 Legislative history]
- Introduced in the House as H.R. 697 by Rep. Joe Heck (R-NV) on February 14, 2013; Committee consideration by United States House Committee on Natural Resources, United States House Natural Resources Subcommittee on Energy and Mineral Resources, United States House Natural Resources Subcommittee on Public Lands and Environmental Regulation, United States Senate Committee on Energy and Natural Resources; Passed the House on July 22, 2013 (voice vote); Passed the Senate on July 9, 2014 (unanimous consent); Signed into law by President Barack Obama on July 25, 2014

The Three Kids Mine Remediation and Reclamation Act (H.R. 697; Pub. L. 113–135 (text) (PDF)) is a U.S. public law that authorizes the sale of approximately 950 acres of federal land to the city of Henderson, Nevada. The land used to be an open-pit manganese mine known as the Three Kids Mine, and now needs significant environmental remediation and reclamation. The bill was introduced into the United States House of Representatives during the 113th United States Congress; a previous version (H.R. 2512) passed the House during the 112th United States Congress, but never received a vote in the Senate. Cleanup efforts of the land are expected to cost between $300 million and $1.2 billion, depending on various estimates and cleanup targets.

== Provisions/Elements of the bill ==
This summary is based largely on the summary provided by the Congressional Research Service, a public domain source.

The Three Kids Mine Remediation and Reclamation Act would direct the United States Department of the Interior to convey to the Henderson Redevelopment Agency of the city of Henderson, Nevada, the Three Kids Mine Federal Land (the parcel or parcels of federal land consisting of approximately 948 specified acres) for the environmental remediation and reclamation of the Three Kids Mine Project Site. The bill also would direct the Secretary of the Interior to administratively adjust the fair market value of the Three Kids Mine Federal Land based on the reasonable approximate assessment, remediation, and reclamation costs for the Three Kids Mine Project Area. The bill would then require the Henderson Redevelopment Agency to pay the fair market value, if any for the Three Kids Mine Federal Land.

The bill would adjust the boundary of the River Mountains Area of Critical Environmental Concern. It also releases the United States, upon making the conveyance, from any and all liabilities or claims of any kind or nature arising from the presence, release, or threat of release of any hazardous substance or mining related materials at the Three Kids Mine Project Site.

Finally, it would make the provisions of the Southern Nevada Public Land Management Act of 1998 (Pub. L. 105–273 (text) (PDF)) inapplicable to land conveyed under this Act.

== Congressional Budget office report ==
H.R. 697 would require the Bureau of Land Management (BLM) to sell 950 acres of federal land, some of which are contaminated by hazardous waste, to the city of Henderson, Nevada. Under the bill, the agency would determine the sale price by estimating the fair market value of the land and reducing that amount by the estimated cost of any necessary environmental remediation and mining reclamation activities at the site. The city of Henderson would be responsible for those costs following the sale. Based on information from the BLM, the Congressional Budget Office (CBO) estimates that implementing the legislation would have no significant impact on the federal budget. Enacting the bill would not affect direct spending or revenues; therefore, pay-as-you-go procedures do not apply.

Roughly 15 percent of the lands that would be sold under the bill are contaminated and will require mine reclamation and environmental remediation. Based on information provided by the BLM and the city of Henderson, the CBO estimates that the agency is unlikely to receive any financial compensation for any of the land because remediation and reclamation costs would exceed the land’s fair market value. Because the CBO expects that the affected lands would not generate any receipts under current law over the next 10 years, the CBO estimates that conveying the lands under the bill would have no significant impact on the federal budget.

== Procedural history ==
The Three Kids Mine Remediation and Reclamation Act was introduced into the House by Rep. Joe Heck (R-NV) on February 14, 2013. The bill was referred to the United States House Committee on Natural Resources and two of its subcommittees: the United States House Natural Resources Subcommittee on Energy and Mineral Resources and the United States House Natural Resources Subcommittee on Public Lands and Environmental Regulation. On July 8, 2013, it was reported (amended) by the Committee on Natural Resources alongside House Report 113-137. On Friday, July 19, 2013, House Majority Leader Eric Cantor announced that H.R. 697 would be on the schedule for consideration under a suspension of the rules on July 22, 2013. The bill passed by voice vote on July 22, 2013. The bill was received in the United States Senate and referred to the United States Senate Committee on Energy and Natural Resources. On July 9, 2014, the Senate passed the bill by unanimous consent. President Barack Obama signed the bill into law on July 25, 2014.

== Debate and discussion ==
The City of Henderson, NV paid a lobbyist organization $10,000 in 2013, part of which went to fund lobbying activities in favor of the Three Kids Mine Remediation and Reclamation Act.

In 2013, the Las Vegas Sun listed off the Three Kids Mine Remediation and Reclamation Act as item number three in its list of "Top 10 Nevada land swaps stalled in Congress," noting that 87 percent of Nevada's land is federally owned.

== See also ==
- List of bills in the 113th United States Congress
- Federal lands
- Environmental remediation
- Mine reclamation
