= Goodbye Casanova =

- VHS cover
- Directed by: Mauro Borrelli
- Written by: Mauro Borrelli
- Produced by: Mauro Borrelli; Jeff Kirshbaum
- Starring: Yasmine Bleeth; Carmen Filpi; Gian-Carlo Scandiuzzi; Pamela Gidley; Flea; Ellen Bradley
- Cinematography: Steven Bernstein
- Edited by: M. Edward Salier
- Music by: Marco Beltrami; Gianluca Piersanti
- Production company: Eyestrain Production
- Release date: 2000
- Running time: 85 minutes
- Country: United States
- Language: English

Goodbye Casanova was a 2000 fantasy-romance film directed by Mauro Borrelli, starring Yasmine Bleeth, Paul Ganus, Gian-Carlo Scandiuzzi and Flea (the bassist from Red Hot Chili Peppers).

== Plot ==
Robert is an aspiring novelist who operates a tiny neighborhood bookstore. Claudia is his wife and a talented painter. Robert and Claudia's marriage is disintegrating, and they are about to sign their divorce papers.

Meanwhile, the legendary Casanova and his lover Lavinia are characters trapped inside of a 17th-century children's book. The tragedy of the impending divorce triggers the release of Casanova and Lavinia from the confines of the children's pop-up book.

== Cast ==
- Yasmine Bleeth as Lavinia
- Carmen Filpi as Festus
- Pamela Gidley as Hilly
- Flea as Silent
- Gian-Carlo Scandiuzzi as Giacomo Casanova
- Ellen Bradley as Claudia
- Paul Ganus as Robert
- Mario Opinato as Italian singer (voice)

== Awards ==
Goodbye Casanova won the Audience Award at the Los Angeles Italian Film Awards for the director, Mauro Borrelli, in 2000.

The film also won the Feature Film Award for Best Set Design and the award for Best Art Direction for director, Mauro Borelli, at the New York International Independent Film & Video Festival in the Spring of 2001.
