= List of Metro-Goldwyn-Mayer films (1970–1979) =

The following is a list of films originally produced and/or distributed theatrically by Metro-Goldwyn-Mayer and released in the 1970s.

== 1970 ==
Release date	Title	Notes
January 9, 1970	Tick, Tick, Tick	—
February 9, 1970	Zabriskie Point	co-production with Trianon Productions
February 20, 1970	The Five Man Army	distribution outside Italy only
April 22, 1970	Brotherly Love	British film
April 27, 1970	Zig Zag	—
May 13, 1970	My Lover, My Son	distribution only; produced by Sagittarius Productions
May 26, 1970	The Magic Garden of Stanley Sweetheart	—
June 10, 1970	The Walking Stick	British film
June 15, 1970	The Strawberry Statement	co-production with Chartoff-Winkler Productions
June 23, 1970	Kelly's Heroes	co-production with Katzka-Loeb Productions
July 1970	The Moonshine War	co-production with Filmways
October 1, 1970	The Traveling Executioner	co-production with Solitaire Productions
October 7, 1970 (Note: Released in British theaters on December 21, 1969.)	Captain Nemo and the Underwater City	British film
October 23, 1970	No Blade of Grass	—
October 28, 1970	House of Dark Shadows	—
October 28, 1970	The Sidelong Glances of a Pigeon Kicker	U.S. theatrical distribution only
November 7, 1970	The Phantom Tollbooth	co-production with MGM Animation/Visual Arts
November 9, 1970	Ryan's Daughter	British film
November 11, 1970	Elvis: That's the Way It Is	distribution only
November 18, 1970	Dirty Dingus Magee	—
November 1970 (Note: Released in British theaters on September 1969.)	The Bushbaby	—
December 5, 1970	Brewster McCloud	co-production with Lion's Gate Films
December 17, 1970	Alex in Wonderland	co-production with Coriander Productions

== 1971 ==
Release date	Title	Notes
February 24, 1971	The Body (Note: Owned by StudioCanal, with U.S. distribution handled by Lionsgate)	North American distribution only; produced by Kestrel Films
March 3, 1971	Percy	North American, West German and Italian distribution only; produced by Anglo-EMI
March 18, 1971	Get Carter	British film
March 29, 1971	Mad Dogs & Englishmen	distribution only; produced by A&M Films and Creative Film Associates
April 22, 1971	The Enchanted Years	—
April 28, 1971	Pretty Maids All in a Row	—
April 30, 1971	The Big Doll House	international theatrical distribution only; produced by New World Pictures
May 12, 1971	The Night Digger	British film; distribution only; produced by Youngstreet Productions
May 26, 1971	Villain (Note: International rights owned by StudioCanal)	distribution outside the U.K. and Ireland only; produced by Anglo-EMI
June 15, 1971	Fortune and Men's Eyes	—
June 23, 1971	Wild Rovers	co-production with Geoffrey Productions
June 30, 1971	The Tales of Beatrix Potter	North American theatrical distribution only; produced by GW Films and EMI Films
July 2, 1971	Shaft	—
July 7, 1971	The Last Run	—
August 4, 1971	Night of Dark Shadows	—
August 1971	Clay Pigeon	North American theatrical distribution only
September 1, 1971	Jo	French film; international distribution only
September 10, 1971	Evel Knievel	international theatrical distribution only; distributed in North America by Fanfare Films
September 14, 1971	The Anonymous Venetian	international theatrical distribution outside Italy and Japan only
October 20, 1971	Catlow	co-production with Frontier Films
December 1, 1971	Going Home	—
December 1, 1971	Chandler	distribution only
December 8, 1971	Believe in Me	co-production with Chartoff-Winkler Productions
December 16, 1971	The Boy Friend	British film
December 22, 1971	The Gang That Couldn't Shoot Straight	co-production with Chartoff-Winkler Productions

== 1972 ==
Release date	Title	Notes
February 2, 1972	The Jerusalem File	—
February 19, 1972	Without Apparent Motive	international theatrical distribution outside France and Italy only
March 15, 1972	Corky	—
March 22, 1972	Cool Breeze	distribution only; produced by Penelope Productions
March 29, 1972	The Carey Treatment	—
May 24, 1972	Skyjacked	co-production with Walter Seltzer Productions
June 7, 1972	Black Belly of the Tarantula	theatrical distribution outside Italy only
June 7, 1972	The Weekend Murders	theatrical distribution outside Italy only
June 14, 1972	Every Little Crook and Nanny	—
June 19, 1972	Sitting Target	British film
June 19, 1972	One Is a Lonely Number	Also known as Two Is a Happy Number; co-production with Wolper Pictures
June 21, 1972	Shaft's Big Score	—
July 14, 1972	The Wrath of God	—
July 26, 1972	Night of the Lepus	—
August 2, 1972	Kansas City Bomber	co-production with Levy-Gardner-Laven and Artists Entertainment Complex
August 16, 1972	Melinda	—
September 8, 1972	Private Parts	as Premier Productions; distribution only; produced by Penelope Productions
October 1972	Savage Messiah	British film
November 1, 1972	Elvis on Tour	distribution only
November 1, 1972	The Great Waltz	—
November 22, 1972	They Only Kill Their Masters	—
December 17, 1972	Travels with My Aunt	—
December 20, 1972	Hit Man	distribution only; produced by Penelope Productions

== 1973 ==
Release date	Title	Notes
February 21, 1973	Lolly-Madonna XXX	—
February 22, 1973	Walking Tall	international theatrical distribution only; produced by Bing Crosby Productions; distributed in North America by Cinerama Releasing Corporation
March 7, 1973	Slither	—
March 8, 1973	Ludwig	theatrical distribution in North and South America, the U.K., Ireland, Australia and New Zealand only
April 19, 1973	Soylent Green	co-production with Walter Seltzer Productions
May 9, 1973	Hitler: The Last Ten Days	international theatrical distribution outside Australia and New Zealand only; produced by Tomorrow Entertainment and West Film; distributed in North America by Paramount Pictures
May 23, 1973	Pat Garrett and Billy the Kid	—
May 25, 1973	Sweet Jesus, Preacherman	—
June 13, 1973	Wicked, Wicked	co-production with United National Pictures
June 20, 1973	Shaft in Africa	—
June 28, 1973	The Man Who Loved Cat Dancing	—
June 1973	Trader Horn	—
July 25, 1973	Deaf Smith & Johnny Ears	—
August 17, 1973	Westworld	—
September 26, 1973	Deadly China Doll	U.S. theatrical distribution only
September 26, 1973	The Slams	distribution only; produced by Penelope Productions
October 19, 1973	The Outfit	—

== 1974 ==
Release date	Title	Notes
March 20, 1974	The Super Cops	—
May 8, 1974	Kazablan	distribution outside Israel only
May 17, 1974	That's Entertainment!	—
September 20, 1974	Nightmare Honeymoon	—

== 1975 ==
Release date	Title	Notes
January 29, 1975	Mr. Ricco	—
April 9, 1975	The Passenger (Note: Owned by Sony Pictures (via Sony Pictures Classics))	distribution only
May 22, 1975	The Wind and the Lion	North American distribution only; distributed internationally by Columbia Pictures
June 20, 1975	The Silent Stranger	co-production with ABKCO Industries
October 8, 1975	Hearts of the West	—
November 6, 1975	The Sunshine Boys	co-production with Rastar

== 1976 ==
Release date	Title	Notes
May 17, 1976	That's Entertainment, Part II	—
June 23, 1976	Logan's Run	—
June 1976	Sweet Revenge	—
September 29, 1976	Norman... Is That You?	—
November 27, 1976	Network (Note: International rights retained by MGM itself (via United Artists))	Nominated for Academy Award for Best Picture co-production with United Artists

== 1977 ==
Release date	Title	Notes
April 8, 1977	Demon Seed	—
November 30, 1977	The Goodbye Girl	Nominated for Academy Award for Best Picture co-production with Warner Bros. and Rastar
December 16, 1977	Telefon	—

== 1978 ==
Release date	Title	Notes
January 6, 1978	Coma	—
June 2, 1978	Corvette Summer	—
July 19, 1978	International Velvet	—
December 22, 1978	Brass Target	—

== 1979 ==
Release date	Title	Notes
March 14, 1979	Voices	—
April 4, 1979	The Champ	remake of the 1931 film
December 18, 1979	The Human Factor	North American distribution only; produced by Wheel Productions and Sigma Productions

== See also ==
- Lists of Metro-Goldwyn-Mayer films

== Notes ==
Release notes
