= Fires Within =

- Film poster
- Directed by: Gillian Armstrong
- Written by: Cynthia Cidre
- Starring: Jimmy Smits; Greta Scacchi; Vincent D'Onofrio
- Cinematography: David Gribble
- Edited by: Lou Lombardo; John Scott
- Music by: Maurice Jarre
- Production company: Metro-Goldwyn-Mayer
- Distributed by: MGM-Pathé Communications
- Release date: June 28, 1991
- Running time: 86 minutes
- Country: United States
- Language: English
- Budget: $9.6 million
- Box office: $71,658 (US)

Fires Within is a 1991 film directed by Gillian Armstrong. It stars Jimmy Smits, Greta Scacchi and Vincent D'Onofrio.

== Plot ==
Set in the Cuban community in Miami, the story revolves around the relationship between Nestor, a recently released political prisoner, his wife Isabel, who had fled Cuba after Nestor was imprisoned, and Sam, the fisherman who had rescued Isabel from almost certain death at sea.

== Cast ==
- Jimmy Smits as Nestor
- Greta Scacchi as Isabel
- Vincent D'Onofrio as Sam
- Luis Avalos as Victor Hernandez
- Bertila Damas as Estella Sanchez
- Brian Miranda as Victor Hernandez Jr.

== Production ==
Because she'd never had them done previously, Greta Scacchi had to have her ears pierced especially for her role as Isabel, so that she would be able to wear the large gold hoop earrings favoured by many Cuban women.
