= Liebestraum (film) =

1991 film by Mike Figgis

- Theatrical release poster
- Directed by: Mike Figgis
- Written by: Mike Figgis
- Produced by: Eric Fellner
- Starring: Kevin Anderson; Pamela Gidley; Bill Pullman; Kim Novak; Zach Grenier
- Cinematography: Juan Ruiz Anchía
- Edited by: Martin Hunter
- Music by: Mike Figgis
- Production companies: Initial; Pathé Entertainment
- Distributed by: Metro-Goldwyn-Mayer
- Release dates: August 16, 1991 (Boston Film Festival); September 13, 1991 (New York City)
- Running time: 112 minutes
- Country: United States
- Language: English
- Budget: £5 million
- Box office: $133,645 (U.S.)

Liebestraum (lit. transl. "dream of love") is a 1991 American mystery film written and directed by Mike Figgis, and starring Kevin Anderson, Pamela Gidley, Bill Pullman, Zach Grenier, Alicia Witt, Taina Elg, and Kim Novak in her last film role to date. Set in a small Illinois town, it follows an architect professor who begins an affair with his college friend's photographer wife while visiting his dying birthmother. The film is set against the backdrop of the demolition of an abandoned historic building where a murder–suicide occurred decades prior. It takes its name from Franz Liszt's piano nocturnes Liebesträume (1850).

== Plot ==
In 1953 Elderstown, Illinois, a silhouetted man closes in on an unseen man and woman engaged in an illicit affair. Both appear to be shot dead before the man presumably commits suicide. A vinyl phonograph record playing Franz Liszt's Liebesträume piano nocturnes is destroyed in the shootout.

Thirty years later, Nick, a professor of architecture in upstate New York arrives in Elderstown to be with his birth mother, Lillian, in the final days of her illness; he was adopted and never met her before. He becomes intrigued with the building across from his hotel. He runs into Paul, a college friend, whose construction company is demolishing the Ralston department store where the murder-suicide happened thirty years before. The building is an ornate cast-iron construction, requiring Nick to study it before the demolition. Nick saves Paul's life by pushing him away from a falling piece of the building's crumbling façade.

Nick is invited to a birthday party for Paul's wife. Jane is a photographer with an interest in the Ralston building. Nick also meets Dr. Parker, the physician in charge of Lillian's care, and Dr. Parker's provocative wife Mary, a nurse at the hospital who makes Nick uncomfortable. Nick expresses remorse over the building's demolition, regarding it an important architectural landmark, but Paul heatedly defends its demolition and redevelopment of the land.

When Paul leaves for a Chicago business trip, Nick and Jane spend several days together exploring the building. Nick's research reveals the building owner, Barnett, learned of his wife's affair with an employee named Munson in 1953. Barnett confronted the lovers in the store and allegedly shot them before killing himself. Mrs. Ralston survived the shooting but suffered permanent brain damage.

Nick learns that Lillian's medical records list her married name as Munssen. Crime scene photographs obtained from a city clerk reveal he bears a striking resemblance to the murdered Munssen. Lillian's condition worsens, and Jane accompanies Nick to the hospital. While Nick comforts Lillian, Jane attempts to comfort another elderly patient left alone in the hallway. The woman's face, scarred by a bullet, frightens Jane. The woman is revealed to be Mrs. Ralston. When Jane enters Lillian's room, Lillian begins screaming obscene accusations at her, and Jane flees.

Paul returns to Elderstown and reunites with Jane. Lillian recounts the 1953 murder–suicide as her dying words. It was in fact her who, while pregnant with Nick, shot her husband and Mrs. Ralston after finding them having an affair in the department store, then murdered Barnett Ralston, who witnessed the crime. After Lillian passes away, Paul enters the department store and finds Jane and Nick lying in each other's arms, and tearfully walks away.

== Cast ==
- Kevin Anderson as Nick Kaminsky
- Pamela Gidley as Jane Kessler
- Bill Pullman as Paul Kessler
- Kim Novak as Lillian Anderssen Munnsen
  - Sarah Fearon as Young Lillian Munnsen
- Graham Beckel as Sheriff Pete Ricker
- Zach Grenier as Barnard Ralston IV
- Thomas Kopache as Dr. Parker
- Anne Lange as Nurse #1
- Jack Wallace as Mike
- Max Perlich as Ben, orderly #1
- Catherine Hicks as Mary Parker
- Roger Howarth as Boy in Rain
- Ian Rob Witt as Boy in Dream
- Alicia Witt as Girl in Dream
- Taina Elg as Old Mother Ralston
- Tom McDermott as Night Porter
- Joseph McKenna as Day Clerk
- Hugh Hurd as Orderly #2
- Joe Aufiery as Buddy
- Harper Harris as Nurse #2
- Karen Sillas as Nurse #3
- Tracy Thorne as Nurse #4
- Bill Raymond as Matt
- Nola Mae Sanders as Maria
- Lorie Blanding as Barmaid
- Bernie Sheredy as Barnett Ralston III

== Production ==
Principal photography of Liebestraum took place in Binghamton, New York, with filming beginning on June 27, 1990.

== Release and reception ==
Liebestraum premiered at the Boston Film Festival on August 16, 1991. It opened theatrically in New York City on September 13, 1991.

On the review aggregator website Rotten Tomatoes, 42% of 12 critics' reviews are positive.

=== Home media ===
When Liebestraum made its VHS debut, it was released in two editions — the R-rated theatrical version and an unrated director's cut. The DVD release, part of MGM's Avant-Garde Cinema series, features only the R-rated version. However, the deleted scene that marks the single difference between the two edits is included as a bonus feature on the disc.

Cinématographe, a subsidiary label of Vinegar Syndrome, released Liebestraum on Blu-ray on May 26, 2026.
