= Giancarlo Parretti =

Italian financier (born 1941)

- Born: 23 October 1941 (age 84); Orvieto, Italy
- Occupations: Financier; former media mogul
- Known for: Pathé Communications
- Spouse: Maria Cecconi
- Children: 2
- Convictions: Fraudulent bankruptcy (1990); Perjury and tampering with evidence (1996)
- Penalty: Sentenced in absentia to 46 months in prison (1990); Ordered to pay $1.5 billion (1997); Sentenced in absentia to four years in prison and fined one million French francs (1999)

Giancarlo Parretti (born 23 October 1941) is an Italian financier, who has bought, sold, and operated numerous businesses.

== Early life ==
Parretti was born in Orvieto, north of Rome, Italy. He worked as a waiter in London before moving to Sicily.

== Career ==
=== Real estate ===
In Sicily, Parretti claimed to have used government aid to buy and sell at least four hotels. In 1983, he bought three Italian insurance companies and two years later sold them to a Geneva-based merchant bank, Sasea Holdings.

Parretti once was an owner and chairman of the 300-hotel Melia Hotel chain, and Renta Immobiliaria S.A, a Spanish real estate company. He was once a partner of the Spanish newspaper El Mundo.

=== Media industry ===
From 1979 to 1981, Parretti was chairman of Siracusa Calcio, and partners with Gianni De Michelis and Cesare De Michelis in the daily newspaper "Il Diario", that was published between 1979 and 1981.

In 1986, Parretti gained control of Le Matin de Paris, a Socialist newspaper in Paris, which went bankrupt a year later.

=== Pathé ===
In 1989, he took over The Cannon Group, Inc. from Menahem Golan and Yoram Globus. Almost immediately afterwards, he made plans to take over the historic French studio Pathé, and changed Cannon's name to Pathé Communications in anticipation of the buyout. However, the French government blocked his bid due to concerns about his background.

"In 1990, the Italian financier Giancarlo Parretti was trying to line up the Liberian government as an investor in a company he was using to buy MGM/UA Communications. But the relationship ended when Mr. Parretti’s ally, the Liberian president Samuel K. Doe, was tortured and killed by opponents."

Undaunted, Parretti bought Metro-Goldwyn-Mayer (MGM) in 1990 for $1.2 billion, using money borrowed from the Dutch arm of Crédit Lyonnais and contingent on future profits financing the purchase from mogul Kirk Kerkorian.

Parretti persuaded Steve Ross (who, at the time, was founder and chairman of Time Warner) to guarantee a $650 million loan to help his Pathé Communications to carry out the deal, with Time Warner in return gaining access to 3,000 films in the Pathé and MGM/UA libraries to distribute worldwide through theaters, TV and home video. Parretti then merged the former Cannon with the MGM purchase to create the short-lived MGM-Pathé Communications.

=== MGM ===
Under Parretti's control, MGM released almost no films (one victim being the James Bond franchise; the planned production of the seventeenth Bond film), while Parretti enjoyed a Hollywood mogul lifestyle. He fired most of the accounting staff, appointed his then 21-year-old daughter to a senior financial post, and used company money to buy lavish gifts for several girlfriends, including a former runner-up for Miss Universe. In 1991, his ownership dissolved in a flurry of lawsuits and a default to Crédit Lyonnais, and Parretti faced securities fraud charges in both the United States and Europe. In March 1999, he was found guilty of misuse of corporate funds and fraud and was sentenced in absentia to four years in prison and fined one million French francs by a Paris court.

"an ex-waiter whose principal expertise was Ponzi schemes, not film"...much of the bank's money went to what were euphemistically called 'development deals' involving young women who were neither filmmakers nor developers" – Peter Bart

== In popular culture ==
Parretti is the subject of the 2024 documentary The Man Who Definitely Didn't Steal Hollywood, directed by British filmmaker John Dower.

== See also ==
- List of trading losses
