= MGM-Pathé Communications =

American film production company (1990–92)

- Type: Private
- Industry: Film studio
- Predecessor: MGM/UA Communications Company; Empire International Pictures; The Cannon Group, Inc.; Pathé Communications
- Founded: November 1, 1990; 36 years ago
- Founder: Giancarlo Parretti
- Defunct: July 2, 1992; 34 years ago
- Fate: Foreclosure; reverted to Metro-Goldwyn-Mayer
- Successors: Metro-Goldwyn-Mayer; MGM Holdings; Amazon MGM Studios
- Headquarters: Los Angeles County, California; United States
- Key people: Giancarlo Parretti (MGM-Pathé, 1990–1991); Alan Ladd Jr. (MGM-Pathé, 1991–1993); Frank Mancuso Sr. (MGM/UA, 1993–1999); Michael Marcus (MGM, 1993–1996); John Calley (UA, 1993–1996)
- Products: Motion pictures; Video releasing; Cinema chains; Television

MGM-Pathé Communications was an American film production company that operated in Los Angeles County, California, from November 1, 1990 to July 2, 1992.

The company was founded and controlled by Italian financier Giancarlo Parretti through his purchase and merger of MGM/UA Communications Co. and Pathé Communications (unrelated to the French Pathé studio). The company was overshadowed by Parretti's fraudulent schemes and he found himself ousted from the studio in less than a year.

== History ==
Pathé Communications was named after the similarly named French studio.

=== 1980s ===
On January 30, 1989, Parretti founded Pathé Entertainment (or Pathé Communications) after purchasing Cannon Films. Pathé Entertainment was named after the similarly named French studio that Parretti anticipated to purchase. When Parretti had announced his intent to make the purchase, the French government blocked Parretti's initial bid to buy Pathé due to concerns about his character, background, and past dealings. Alan Ladd Jr. was appointed as chairman and CEO of Pathé Entertainment.

After Parretti's plans to acquire New World Pictures and Kings Road Entertainment went nowhere, Parretti set his sights on purchasing MGM/UA. In the mid-1980s, American businessman Kirk Kerkorian sold portions of MGM/UA to Ted Turner's Turner Broadcasting System. In 1985–86, Kerkorian repurchased United Artists and then MGM, but without the company's film library and Culver City lot and film processing labs (entities which had been earlier sold by Ted Turner to Lorimar). In 1989, Kerkorian agreed to sell his MGM/UA interests to Australian broadcasting company Qintex after they tendered an offer of $1.5 billion to beat out Rupert Murdoch's News Corporation, which had earlier acquired 20th Century Fox from Marvin Davis in 1985. However, when Qintex was unable to provide a $50 million letter of credit the deal fell through. Five months after the Qintex deal collapsed, Parretti brokered a deal to make the purchase for $1.2 billion, but questions were raised over Parretti's financial acumen.

Parretti gained interest from Time Warner founder and chairman Steve Ross; the company forwarded $125 million to the MGM/UA purchase in exchange for exclusive home video distribution rights to the studio's product. Turner Broadcasting System advanced Parretti $200 million for domestic television rights. Parretti also made deals with Fininvest, Sasea (a Swiss-based holding firm controlled by Parretti's business partner Florio Fiorini), and Reteitalia to fund the acquisition (it was later uncovered that most of the deals came with certain conditions attached to them, or else were, in fact, fake deals used to cover money loaned under the table to Parretti from Crédit Lyonnais, his primary banking partner and whose involvement with Parretti's shady activities ran deep). He ultimately received backing from the Dutch arm of Crédit Lyonnais to complete the MGM/UA purchase.

=== 1990s ===
Parretti merged MGM with his Pathé Communications Group, to form MGM-Pathe Communications Co. on November 1, 1990. Once Parretti took control, he laid off most of the financial staff, and offered a major financial role to his then 21-year-old daughter, Valentina. Parretti licensed the MGM/UA library to Time Warner for home video (Note: Steve Ross served as founder of Time Warner from January 10, 1990 until his death on December 20, 1992 and J. Richard Munro served as co-founder of Time Warner from January 10, 1990 until his death on May 9, 2024.) and Turner Broadcasting System for domestic television rights (Note: Ted Turner served as founder of Turner Broadcasting System from May 12, 1965 until his death on May 6, 2026.) from November 1, 1990 to July 2, 1992. Unlike Ted Turner's MGM Entertainment Co. era from March 25 to August 26, 1986, Parretti did not immediately sell United Artists back to Kerkorian. Soon enough, chaos ensued at MGM. A six-figure check to Dustin Hoffman bounced. The openings of Thelma & Louise and the John Candy film Delirious were delayed due to lack of funds. The studio owed a line of credit to Sean Connery that wasn't paid. It also withdrew financing from the ninth Pink Panther film, and director Blake Edwards sued the studio in the Los Angeles County Superior Court. When Alan Ladd Jr. came aboard, MGM settled out of court with Edwards and Ladd greenlit the film. There were also reports of unpaid laboratory bills, unpaid creditors, and rather eccentric behavior from Parretti.

In March 1991, MGM clients took a complaint to Los Angeles lawyer Stephen Chrystie, claiming that they were owed money ($18 million total) that the studio refused to pay. In turn, Chrystie took this issue up to the U.S. Bankruptcy Court. As it turned out, the studio's situation was dire that Chapter 7 bankruptcy was considered. Crédit Lyonnais refused to lend money to MGM any further unless the studio ousted Parretti from his position. Parretti intended to sell off the James Bond's films distribution rights of the studio's catalogue so he could collect advance payments to finance the buyout. This included international broadcasting rights to the 007 library at cut-rate prices, leading Danjaq to sue, alleging the licensing violated the Bond distribution agreements the company made with United Artists in 1962, while denying Danjaq a share of the profits. Ladd, a former President of MGM/UA, was then brought on board as CEO of MGM in April 1991, and James Kanter as chief operating officer. The new change in management helped save the studio from involuntary bankruptcy.

Soon after, Ladd and Parretti began engaging in a bitter power struggle. When it became apparent that Parretti was making plans to regain MGM, Crédit Lyonnais seized control of the studio on June 17, 1991. Parretti faced securities fraud charges in the United States and Europe. On the verge of bankruptcy and failure, Crédit Lyonnais foreclosed in 1992, assigned control of MGM-Pathé to a subsidiary, and changed its name back to Metro-Goldwyn-Mayer on July 2, 1992. To no avail, Parretti had demanded that the MGM executive committee sell off certain assets in order to pay down the loan to Crédit Lyonnais so that he could regain control, but the committee declined due to concerns over the price adequacy of the portions of the company Parretti wished sold.

On July 26, 1993, Crédit Lyonnais replaced Ladd as CEO by bringing in former Paramount Pictures executive Frank Mancuso Sr. Mancuso then brought in Michael Marcus to head MGM and former Warner Bros. Pictures executive John Calley as head of United Artists. As part of his exit package Ladd took some of the top properties, including Braveheart. After the split, Pathé revived, but MGM/UA CI did not. The company remained under control of Crédit Lyonnais Bank until 1996, when it was repurchased by an investment group led by Kirk Kerkorian, who on April 11, 1997 also purchased Metromedia's media assets including Orion Pictures, The Samuel Goldwyn Company, and Motion Picture Corporation of America, thus obtaining rights to 1,900 film titles and 3,000 television episodes and bringing the MGM film archives to more than 5,000 titles at that time.

== List of films ==
- Death Warrant (1990)
- Desperate Hours (1990)
- Quigley Down Under (1990)
- The Russia House (1990)
- Company Business (1991)
- Crooked Hearts (1991)
- Delirious (1991)
- Fires Within (1991)
- Harley Davidson and the Marlboro Man (1991)
- The Indian Runner (1991)
- Liebestraum (1991)
- Life Stinks (1991)
- The Man in the Moon (1991)
- Not Without My Daughter (1991)
- Rush (1991)
- Shattered (1991)
- Thelma & Louise (1991)
- Timebomb (1991)
- CrissCross (1992)
- The Cutting Edge (1992)
- Once Upon a Crime (1992)
- The Vagrant (1992)
- Rich in Love (1992)
