= List of 20th Century Fox International films =

This is a list of films produced/distributed by 20th Century Fox (now 20th Century Studios) Internationally. This list include releases from Germany, Brazil, Mexico, Russia, Spain as well as other countries outside North America. It does not include releases from Fox Star Studios as it has its own list of films, unless 20th Century Fox distributed Fox Star Studios films in select international territories.

== 1960s ==
Release Date	Title	Country	Notes
April 17, 1961	Les Mauvais Coups	France	distribution only

== 1970s ==
Release Date	Title	Country	Notes
September 9, 1976	Max Havelaar	Netherlands	distribution only; produced by P.T. Mondial Motion Pictures, Rademakers Productie BV and Jakarta Film

== 1980s ==
Release Date	Title	Country	Notes
September 11, 1985	Dust	France	distribution only; produced by Centre du Cinéma et de l'Audiovisuel de la Fédération Wallonie-Bruxelles, Daska Films and Flach Film

== 1990s ==
Release Date	Title	Country	Notes
February 2, 1996	Palermo – Milan One Way	Italy	distribution only; produced by Globe Films and Production Group
October 4, 1996	La lupa	Italy	distribution only; produced by Globe Films and Production Group
December 18, 1997	The Wiggles Movie	Australia	distribution only; produced by Gladusarus Productions
June 18, 1999	Sexo, pudor y lágrimas	Mexico	distribution in Latin America only; produced by Titán Producciones, Argos Cine, Tabasco Films and IMCINE
September 10, 1999	Libero Burro	Italy	distribution only; produced by Intrepido Film and RAI-Radiotelevisione Italiana
December 17, 1999	Xuxa Requebra	Brazil	distribution only; produced by Xuxa Produções and Diler & Associados

== 2000s ==
Release Date	Title	Country	Notes
February 24, 2000	The Wog Boy	Australia	Australian, New Zealand, German and Austrian distribution only
April 6, 2001	The Knights of the Quest	Italy	distribution only; produced by Duea Film and Quinta Communications
June 8, 2001	Y tu mamá también	Mexico	distribution in Latin America, France, Germany, Austria, Switzerland and Italy only; produced by Producciones Anhelo
September 20, 2001	Inspiración	Mexico	distribution only; produced by Ilusión Film Entertainment
January 25, 2002	Vivir mata	Mexico	distribution only
November 29, 2002	Kamchatka	Spain; Argentina	Spanish distribution only; produced by Buena Vista International, Patagonik Film Group, Alquimia Cinema, Oscar Kramer S.A., Televisión Española and Vía Digital
October 23, 2003	Pinjar	India	theatrical distribution only; produced by Lucky Star Entertainment
November 21, 2003	Tehzeeb	India	theatrical distribution only; produced by 7 Studio Pictures and The Culture Company
June 1, 2004	7 mujeres, 1 homosexual y Carlos	Mexico	distribution only
February 4, 2005	Bullet: Ek Dhamaka	India	theatrical distribution only; produced by Diana S. Films
September 29, 2005	On Probation	Argentina	
November 4, 2005	My Brother's Wife	Mexico	distribution only; produced by Shallow Entertainment
January 6, 2006	If I Were You	Brazil	co-production with Total Entertainment
March 17, 2006	A Wonderful World	Mexico	distribution only; produced by Bandidos Films
September 15, 2006	Alatriste	Spain	Spanish distribution only
April 5, 2007	Waiting for a Miracle	Russia	theatrical distribution in the CIS only; produced by Monumental Pictures
May 18, 2007	I, the Other	Italy	distribution only; produced by Trees Pictures, Sanmarco, Minollo Film and Passworld
September 13, 2007	Trackman	Russia	theatrical distribution in the CIS only; produced by Importfilm and Monumental Pictures
July 10, 2008	Red Cliff	Taiwan	Taiwanese theatrical distribution only; produced by China Film Group Corporation, Chengitan Entertainment, CMC Entertainment, Showbox and Lion Rock Productions
August 8, 2008	Embodiment of Evil	Brazil	distribution in Brazil, Latin America and Portugal only; produced by Gullane Filmes and Olhos de Cao
August 29, 2008	Bezerra de Menezes: O Diário de um Espírito	Brazil	
September 12, 2008	Tear This Heart Out	Mexico	distribution in Latin America only
October 2, 2008	Far Cry	Germany	theatrical distribution with Splendid Film only; produced by Boll KG Productions and Brightlight Pictures
October 9, 2008	Krabat	Germany	distribution only; produced by Claussen + Wöbke + Putz Filmproduktion, SevenPictures Film and B.A. Filmproduktion
October 9, 2008	Admiral	Russia	theatrical distribution in the CIS only; produced by Dago Productions
January 2, 2009	If I Were You 2	Brazil	co-production with Total Entertainment
January 15, 2009	Red Cliff: Part II	Taiwan	Taiwanese theatrical distribution only; produced by China Film Group Corporation, Chengitan Entertainment, CMC Entertainment, Showbox and Lion Rock Productions
April 24, 2009	Brain Drain	Spain	Spanish distribution only; produced by A3 Films
August 25, 2009	High Security Vacation	Russia	theatrical distribution in the CIS only; co-production with Channel One Russia and Buzz Production
October 9, 2009	Agora	Spain	Spanish distribution under the Fox International Productions label only; produced by Focus Features, Telecinco Cinema, MOD Producciones and Himenóptero
October 31, 2009	Sideways	Japan	co-production with Fuji TV
December 4, 2009	Spanish Movie	Spain	co-production with Telecinco Cinema

== 2010s ==
Release Date	Title	Country	Notes
January 7, 2010	13 Semester	Germany	distribution only; produced by Claussen + Wöbke + Putz Filmproduktion, Hessischer Rundfunk, Arte and Instinctive Film
February 18, 2010	Hot Summer Days	Hong Kong	Hong Kong and Singaporean distribution only; produced by Huayi Brothers, Star China Media and Hot Summer Pictures
March 12, 2010	Paper Birds	Spain	Spanish distribution only
September 3, 2010	Astral City: A Spiritual Journey	Brazil	
September 3, 2010	Lope: The Outlaw	Spain; Brazil	Spanish distribution only; produced by Warner Bros. Pictures, Antena 3 Films, Conspiração Filmes, Ikiru Films and El Toro Pictures
September 16, 2010	Hidalgo: la historia jamás contada	Mexico	co-production with Astillero Films
December 17, 2010	Angel of Evil	Italy; France; Romania	Italian distribution only
December 22, 2010	The Yellow Sea	South Korea	South Korean theatrical, German and Austrian distribution only; produced by Showbox, Fox International Productions, Popcorn Film and Wellmade
March 3, 2011	Lyubov-Morkov 3	Russia	Russian distribution only; produced by Fox International Productions and Real Dakota
April 20, 2011	Red Eagle, the Movie	Spain	Spanish distribution only; produced by Fox International Productions and Globomedia
June 17, 2011	Come trovare nel modo giusto l'uomo sbagliato	Italy	Italian distribution only; produced by Fox International Productions and Home Film
August 25, 2011	What a Man	Germany	German and Austrian distribution only; produced by FIP Germany and Pantaleon Films
September 8, 2011	Love in Space	Hong Kong; China	select Asian distribution only; produced by Fox International Productions, Sundream Motion Pictures and Huayi Brothers
September 9, 2011	Miss Bala	Mexico	Mexican distribution under the Fox International Productions label only; produced by Canana Films
September 16, 2011	The Hidden Face	Spain; Colombia	Spanish distribution only; produced by Fox International Productions, Dynamo, Avalon, Cactus Flower and Buena Vista International
January 5, 2012	We Are Family	Russia	Russian distribution only; produced by Fox International Productions and Real Dakota
February 3, 2012	Ghost Graduation	Spain	Spanish distribution only; produced by Fox International Productions Spain, Ciudadano Ciskul, MOD Producciones, Think Studio and Ikiru Films
February 11, 2012	Hayabusa: Harukanaru Kikan	Japan	distribution only; produced with Dentsu
September 7, 2012	Everybody Has a Plan	Spain; Argentina; Germany	Spanish distribution only; produced by Castafiore Films, Haddock Films, Telefe, Tornasol Films and surDream Productions
March 26, 2013	Dragon Ball Z: Battle of Gods	Japan	Japanese distribution (alongside Toei Company, Ltd.) only; produced by Toei Animation
April 4, 2013	Running Man	South Korea	South Korean distribution only; produced by Fox International Productions Korea and Cree Pictures
September 5, 2013	7th Floor	Spain; Argentina	Spanish distribution only; produced by CEPA Audiovisual, El Toro Productions, Ikiru Films, K&S Films, Kramer & Sigman Films, Telecinco Cinema and Televisión Federal
March 14, 2014	The Popcorn Chronicles	Mexico	Mexican distribution only; produced by Fox International Productions, Alameda Films, Blu Films and Cinepantera
March 17, 2014	Copa de Elite	Brazil	Brazilian distribution only; produced by Fox International Productions and GLAZ
March 21, 2014	Starred Up	United Kingdom	U.K. and Irish distribution under the Fox Searchlight Pictures label only; produced by Film4, Creative Scotland, Quickfire Films, Northern Ireland Screen, LipSync Productions and Sigma Films; Nominated - BIFA Award for Best British Independent Film
May 9, 2014	The Food Guide to Love	Spain	Spanish distribution only
August 28, 2014	Playing Doctor	Germany	German and Austrian distribution only; produced by Lieblingsfilm
August 29, 2014	El Niño	Spain; France	Spanish distribution only; produced by Telecinco Cinema, Ikiru Films, Vaca Films, La Ferme! Productions and Maestranza Films
October 2, 2014	Slow Video	South Korea	South Korean theatrical distribution only; produced by Fox International Productions Korea and Our Joyful Young Days Film Co.
November 6, 2014	Mr. Turner	Germany; France; United Kingdom	German and Austrian co-distribution with Prokino Filmverleih only; produced by Film4 Productions, Focus Features, France 3 Cinema, Diaphana Films, Lipsync Productions and Xofa Productions
April 2, 2015	Battle for Sevastopol	Russia; Ukraine	theatrical distribution in the CIS only; produced by Kinorob
April 18, 2015	Dragon Ball Z: Resurrection 'F'	Japan	Japanese (alongside Toei Company, Ltd.), Latin American, Brazilian and Puerto Rican distribution only; produced by Toei Animation
June 25, 2015	Intimate Enemies	South Korea	South Korean theatrical distribution only; produced by Fox International Productions Korea, M-Line Distribution and Ivanhoe Pictures
March 4, 2016	To Steal from a Thief	Spain; Argentina; France	Spanish distribution only; produced by Kramer& Sigman Films, Vaca Films, Morena Films and Telecinco Cinema
April 1, 2016	Altamira	Spain	Spanish distribution only; produced by Samuel Goldwyn Films and Eagle Films
May 12, 2016	The Wailing	South Korea	South Korean theatrical distribution only; produced by Side Mirror and Ivanhoe Pictures
August 26, 2016	Heroes Wanted	Spain	Spanish distribution only; produced by Atresmedia Cine, MOD Producciones and Kowalski Films
May 31, 2017	Warriors of the Dawn	South Korea	South Korean theatrical distribution only; produced by Realies Pictures
June 8, 2017	Plan B	Germany	distribution only; produced by Lightburst Pictures, Reel Deal Action and Papermoon Films
October 12, 2017	Condorito: la película	Chile; Peru; Mexico; Argentina	distribution only; produced by Aronnax Animation Studios and Pajarraco Films, LLC
March 9, 2018	Walk like a Panther	United Kingdom	UK distribution only; produced by Fox International Productions
March 16, 2018	The Tribe	Spain	Spanish distribution only; produced by MOD Producciones and Atresmedia Cine
August 30, 2018	The Flip Side	Australia	co-production with Screen Australia and Corner Table Productions
August 30, 2018	212 Warrior	Indonesia	Indonesian distribution only; produced by Fox International Productions and Lifelike Pictures
August 31, 2018	Yucatán	Spain	distribution only; produced by Ikiru Films and Telecinco Cinema
October 11, 2018	Gun City	Spain	distribution only; produced by Playtime, Vaca Films and Atresmedia Cine
December 14, 2018	Dragon Ball Super: Broly	Japan	Japanese (alongside Toei Company, Ltd.), Latin American, Brazilian and Puerto Rican distribution only; produced by Toei Animation
March 6, 2019	Escape from Raqqa	France	theatrical distribution only; produced by Epithète Films
March 21, 2019	The Balkan Line	Russia; Serbia	distribution in the CIS only; produced by Upgrade Vision, Bless Films, and Archangel Studio
May 1, 2019	Maledicto	Philippines	uncredited, co-distribution with UxS Inc.; produced by Fox Original Productions Asia, Cignal Entertainment, Studio 5 and UxS
August 22, 2019	Abigail	Russia	distribution in the CIS only; produced by KinoDanz
September 26, 2019	Hebe: A Estrela do Brasil	Brazil	studio credit and copyright holder only; produced by Warner Bros. Pictures, Hebe Forever, Labrador Filmes, Globo Filmes and Loma Filmes
December 26, 2019	Union of Salvation	Russia	distribution in the CIS only; produced by Channel One, Cinema Directorate Studio, Ministry for Culture of Russia and Cinema Foundation

== 2020s ==
Release Date	Title	Country	Notes
March 13, 2020	Misbehaviour	United Kingdom	UK and Irish distribution only; produced by Pathé, BBC Films, BFI, Ingenious Media and Left Bank Pictures
August 28, 2020	Macabro	Brazil	
November 12, 2020	Alice & Só	Brazil	
March 18, 2021	Lucicreide Vai pra Marte	Brazil	co-production with Downtown Filmes and Paris Filmes
October 14, 2021	Amarração do Amor	Brazil	co-production with Downtown Filmes and Paris Filmes
April 26, 2022	Incompatível	Brazil	
July 21, 2022	Ela e Eu	Brazil	
