= Dieter Mann =

German filmmaker, academic, and radio personality (1941–2022)

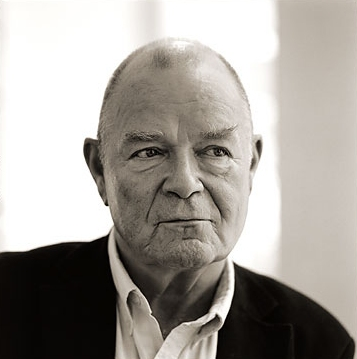
- Mann in 2007
- Born: 20 June 1941; Berlin, Brandenburg, Prussia, German Reich
- Died: 3 February 2022 (aged 80); Berlin, Germany
- Education: Ernst Busch Academy of Dramatic Arts
- Occupation(s): Actor, director, professor, radio announcer
- Years active: 1965–2016
- Spouse: Barbara Schnitzler (divorced)
- Children: 1

Dieter Mann (20 June 1941 – 3 February 2022) was a German actor, director, university professor, and radio personality. In his career, he acted in several theater productions and in over 140 film and television productions. Between 1984 and 1991, he was director of the Deutsches Theater. In 1986, he became a member of the Berlin Academy of Arts. Internationally, he is best known for having portrayed Wilhelm Keitel in Downfall.

== Early life ==
Mann was born in Berlin as the son of a worker. He had an older brother who later became a foreign correspondent. He went to school in Pankow and learned the trade of lathe operator at VEB Kühlautomat. After his Abitur, he began acting training in the early 1960s at the Ernst Busch Academy of Dramatic Arts.

== Career ==
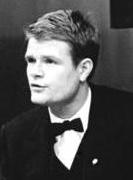
Mann in 1966

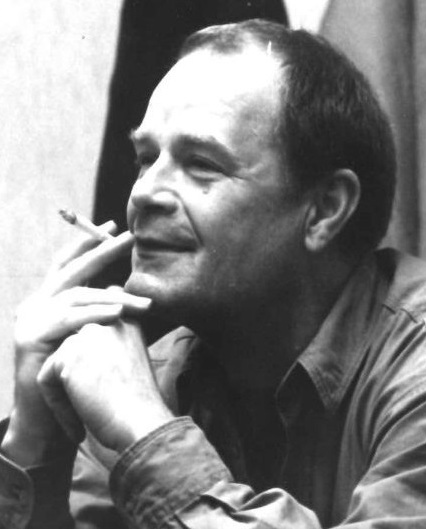
Mann in 1990

From 1964 to 2006, during his time at the Deutsches Theater Berlin, Mann portrayed the Templar in Gotthold Ephraim Lessing's Nathan the Wise, the lead role in Clavigo and Edgar Wibeau in Die neuen Leiden des jungen W.. He also portrayed Demetrius in a German production of A Midsummer Night's Dream. From 1984 to 1991, he was Intendant of the house.

Mann was also a radio announcer for Rundfunk der DDR and would often read plays while on the air. His audio books became bestsellers.

After the reunification of Germany, Mann appeared in a number of productions on film and television. He had guest appearances on the television series such as AS – Danger is his business, Peter Strohm, Tresko, Ein starkes Team, Stubbe – Von Fall zu Fall, In aller Freundschaft, Rosa Roth, Bella Block and several times in Tatort. From 1998 to 2007, he played Prof. Dr. Siegmar Bondzio in the series Der letzte Zeuge. Mann played at the Burgtheater in Vienna and at Frank Castorf's Volksbühne.

From 1995, Mann was a lecturer at the Ernst Busch Academy of Dramatic Arts.

Mann played the role of Generalfeldmarschall Wilhelm Keitel in the Academy Award-nominated 2004 film Downfall. His final roles were in the 2011 drama Way Home and in the 2014 television comedy film Die letzten Millionen.

== Awards ==
- 1965 Erich Weinert Medal
- 1975 Art Prize of the German Democratic Republic
- 1981 Johannes R. Becher Gold Medal
- 1984 National Prize 2nd class
- 1986 Member of the Academy of Arts Berlin
- 1997 Critics' Award from the Berliner Zeitung for his title role in Ithaca
- 2003 nomination of the Berliner Morgenpost for the Critics' Prize 2003 for Fülle des Wohllauts
- 2004 honorary member of the Deutsches Theater
- Member of the Deutsche Akademie der Darstellenden Künste

== Personal life ==
Mann was married to Barbara Schnitzler and had a daughter, actress Pauline Knof. His mother-in-law was actress Inge Keller. Mann remarried and lived near Königs Wusterhausen, Germany.

In 2016, Mann announced that he had Parkinson's disease. He died on 3 February 2022 in Berlin, at the age of 80.

== Filmography ==
The following is an incomplete list of the films where he is credited as actor

- 1965: Berlin um die Ecke – Olaf
- 1967: Geschichten jener Nacht – Robert Wagner (segment "Die Prüfung")
- 1968: I Was Nineteen – Willi Lommer
- 1969: Unterwegs zu Lenin – Erich
- 1969: Wie heiratet man einen König? – Götz
- 1970: He, Du! – Bernd
- 1973: Der kleine Kommandeur – Oberleutnant Schulz
- 1974: Leben mit Uwe – Dr. Hunger
- 1974: Der nackte Mann auf dem Sportplatz – Bauarbeiter
- 1975: Lotte in Weimar – Karl, the butler
- 1976: Requiem für Hans Grundig
- 1976: Die Leiden des jungen Werthers – von Steinfeld
- 1978: Brandstellen – Bruno Kappel
- 1978: Ich will euch sehen – SD-Offizier
- 1978: Das Versteck – Lutz Bibow
- 1980: Glück im Hinterhaus – Karl Erp
- 1980: Levins Mühle – Regierunsgrat von Tittlack
- 1983: Mat Mariya
- 1983: Moritz in der Litfaßsäule – Vater Zack
- 1986: Drost
- 1987: Stielke, Heinz, fünfzehn… – Untersturmführer
- 1989: Zwei schräge Vögel – Dr. Bauer
- 1992: Wunderjahre – Chefredakteur
- 1993: Kaspar Hauser – Baron Wedel
- 1995: The Promise (Das Versprechen) – Konrad's Father
- 1996: Life Is a Bluff – Regierungsdirektor Funkel
- 1997: Death Game – Horst Herold
- 2001: Goebbels und Geduldig
- 2004: Blindgänger – Mann in Zivil
- 2004: Die Stunde der Offiziere – General Carl-Heinrich von Stülpnagel
- 2004: Downfall (Der Untergang) – Feldmarschall Wilhelm Keitel
- 2009: 13 Semester – Professor Schäfer
- 2009: Where to with Dad? – Michael
- 2011: Way Home – Günther

== Writings ==
- Mann, Dieter (2016). Schöne Vorstellung eine Autobiographie in Gesprächen mit Hans-Dieter Schütt (in German). Berlin: Aufbau. ISBN 978-3-351-03637-9. OCLC 929992762.
