= List of 20th Century Fox films (2000–2020) =

This is a list of films released, produced, and/or distributed by 20th Century Fox (now 20th Century Studios) from 2000 until 2020.

== 2000s ==
=== 2000 ===
Release date	Title	Notes
February 11, 2000	The Beach	co-production with Figment Films
February 18, 2000	The Whole Nine Yards (Note: Owned by Morgan Creek Productions, with international rights licensed to Revolution Studios and home media, television and streaming rights sub-licensed to Sony Pictures)	French, German, Austrian, Benelux and Japanese distribution only; produced by Franchise Pictures, Rational Packaging and Lansdown Films; co-distributed in Japan by Metro-Goldwyn-Mayer
March 24, 2000	Here on Earth	distribution only; produced by Fox 2000 Pictures and Friendly Productions
April 28, 2000	Where the Heart Is	distribution in North America, the U.K., Ireland, Australia, New Zealand, South Africa, France and Japan only; produced by Wind Dancer Films
June 2, 2000	Big Momma's House	distribution in all media excluding international television outside Italy only; co-production with Regency Enterprises, Friendly Productions, Runteldat Entertainment and TaurusFilm
June 16, 2000	Titan A.E.	co-production with 20th Century Fox Animation, David Kirschner Productions and Fox Animation Studios
June 23, 2000	Me, Myself & Irene	co-production with Conundrum Entertainment
July 14, 2000	X-Men	co-production with Marvel Entertainment Group, the Donners' Company and Bad Hat Harry Productions
July 21, 2000	What Lies Beneath	international distribution only; co-production with DreamWorks Pictures and ImageMovers
August 11, 2000	Sunset Strip	distribution only; produced by Fox 2000 Pictures and Linson Films
August 25, 2000	The Art of War	distribution in France, Germany, Austria, Switzerland, Italy, Spain, Scandinavia and the Benelux only; produced by Franchise Pictures, Amen Ra Films and Filmline International
October 6, 2000	Digimon: The Movie (Note: Owned by Toei Animation, with U.S. distribution rights licensed to Discotek Media)	co-distribution outside Asia with Fox Kids Movies and Saban Entertainment only; produced by Toei Animation
October 6, 2000	Tigerland	distribution in all media excluding international television outside Italy and Korea only; produced by Regency Enterprises, Kirch Media, Haft Entertainment and New Regency Productions
October 20, 2000	Bedazzled	distribution in all media excluding international television only; co-production with Regency Enterprises, Kirch Media and Trevor Albert Productions
November 3, 2000	The Legend of Bagger Vance	international distribution outside the Benelux, Portugal, Turkey, Switzerland, Scandinavia, Greece, Cyprus, Eastern Europe and the CIS only; co-acquisition with DreamWorks Pictures; produced by Wildwood Enterprises and Allied Filmmakers
November 10, 2000	Men of Honor	distribution only; produced by Fox 2000 Pictures and State Street Pictures
December 15, 2000	Dude, Where's My Car?	co-production with Wayne Rice Films, Gil Netter Productions and Alcon Entertainment (uncredited)
December 22, 2000	Cast Away	North American distribution only; co-production with DreamWorks Pictures, ImageMovers and Playtone

=== 2001 ===
Release date	Title	Notes
February 23, 2001	Monkeybone	co-production with 1492 Pictures
March 23, 2001	Say It Isn't So	co-production with Conundrum Entertainment
March 30, 2001	Someone Like You	distribution only; produced by Fox 2000 Pictures and Lynda Obst Productions
April 11, 2001	Josie and the Pussycats	international theatrical distribution only; produced by Metro-Goldwyn-Mayer, Universal Pictures, Riverdale Productions and Marc Platt Productions
April 20, 2001	Freddy Got Fingered	distribution in all media excluding international television outside Switzerland only; produced by Regency Enterprises, New Regency Productions and MBST
June 1, 2001	Moulin Rouge!	Nominee of the Academy Award for Best Picture. Winner of the Golden Globe Award for Best Motion Picture – Musical or Comedy. co-production with Bazmark Productions
June 1, 2001	What's the Worst That Could Happen?	international theatrical distribution only; produced by Metro-Goldwyn-Mayer, Hyde Park Entertainment and Turman/Morrisey Productions
June 22, 2001	Dr. Dolittle 2	co-production with Davis Entertainment
July 6, 2001	Kiss of the Dragon	distribution in North America, Mexico, the U.K., Ireland, Australia, New Zealand, Italy and Spain only; produced by EuropaCorp, Quality Growth International, Current Entertainment, Immortal Entertainment and Canal+
July 13, 2001	Legally Blonde	international theatrical distribution only; produced by Metro-Goldwyn-Mayer, Marc Platt Productions and Type A Films
July 27, 2001	Planet of the Apes	co-production with the Zanuck Company
September 21, 2001	Glitter	North American theatrical and television distribution only; co-production with Columbia Pictures, Maroon Entertainment and Laurence Mark Productions
September 28, 2001	Don't Say a Word (Note: Co-owned by Alcon Entertainment)	distribution in all media excluding international television outside Australia, New Zealand, Greece, Cyprus, Italy, Switzerland, Singapore and Korea only; produced by Regency Enterprises, Village Roadshow Pictures, NPV Entertainment, Kopelson Entertainment, New Regency Productions and Furthur Films
October 5, 2001	Joy Ride	distribution in all media excluding international television outside Italy, Switzerland and Korea only; produced by Regency Enterprises, New Regency Productions, Bad Robot and LivePlanet
October 19, 2001	From Hell	co-production with Underworld Pictures
November 9, 2001	Shallow Hal	co-production with Conundrum Entertainment
November 21, 2001	Black Knight	distribution in all media excluding international television outside Italy, Switzerland, Korea only; co-production with Regency Enterprises, New Regency Productions, Runteldat Entertainment and the Firm, Inc.
November 30, 2001	Behind Enemy Lines	co-production with Davis Entertainment
December 21, 2001	Joe Somebody	distribution in all media excluding international television outside Italy and Switzerland only; produced by Fox 2000 Pictures, Regency Enterprises, Kopelson Entertainment and Atchity Entertainment International

=== 2002 ===
Release date	Title	Notes
January 25, 2002	Kung Pow: Enter the Fist	co-production with O Entertainment
February 15, 2002	Hart's War	international theatrical distribution outside Japan only; produced by Metro-Goldwyn-Mayer, Cheyenne Enterprises, Ladd Films and David Forster Productions
March 15, 2002	Ice Age	Nominee of the Academy Award for Best Animated Feature. co-production with 20th Century Fox Animation and Blue Sky Studios
April 5, 2002	High Crimes	distribution in all media excluding international television outside Italy and Switzerland only; co-production with Regency Enterprises, New Regency Productions, Manifest Film Company and Monarch Pictures
April 26, 2002	Life or Something Like It	distribution in all media excluding international television outside Italy, Switzerland and Korea only; produced by Regency Enterprises, Davis Entertainment and New Regency Productions
May 10, 2002	Unfaithful	distribution in all media excluding international television outside Italy, Switzerland and Korea only; produced by Fox 2000 Pictures and Regency Enterprises
May 16, 2002	Star Wars: Episode II – Attack of the Clones (Note: Initially co-owned by Disney (by virtue of acquiring Lucasfilm in 2012) and Fox, with the latter retaining distribution rights to the five Star Wars films, as were originally set to expire on May 1, 2020. Disney would gain full control of the rights to this film through the acquisition of 20th Century Fox on March 20, 2019.)	distribution only; produced by Lucasfilm Ltd.
June 14, 2002	Windtalkers	international theatrical distribution outside France and Italy only; produced by Metro-Goldwyn-Mayer and Lion Rock Productions
June 21, 2002	Minority Report	theatrical and international home media distribution only; co-production with DreamWorks Pictures, Amblin Entertainment, Cruise/Wagner Productions and Blue Tulip Productions
June 28, 2002	The First $20 Million Is Always the Hardest	distribution outside Australia and New Zealand only; co-production with Trevor Albert Productions and Ocean Pictures
July 3, 2002	Like Mike	co-production with Heller Highwater, Josephson Entertainment and NBA Entertainment
July 12, 2002	Road to Perdition	international distribution only; co-production with DreamWorks Pictures and the Zanuck Company
July 12, 2002	The Crocodile Hunter: Collision Course	international theatrical distribution only; produced by the Best Picture Show Company and Cheyenne Enterprises
July 26, 2002	Happy Times	international distribution outside China and France only; distributed in North America by Sony Pictures Classics
September 6, 2002	Swimfan	distribution outside the U.K., Ireland, Australia, New Zealand, Spain, Portugal, the Benelux, the Czech Republic, Slovakia, former Yugoslavia and the CIS only; produced by GreeneStreet Films, Cobalt Media Group and Furthur Films
September 13, 2002	Barbershop	international theatrical distribution only; produced by Metro-Goldwyn-Mayer, State Street Pictures and Cube Vision
October 11, 2002	The Transporter	distribution outside France, Belgium, Germany, Austria and Japan only; produced by EuropaCorp, TF1 Films Production, Current Entertainment and Canal+
November 22, 2002	Die Another Day	international theatrical distribution only; produced by Metro-Goldwyn-Mayer and Eon Productions
November 27, 2002	Solaris	co-production with Lightstorm Entertainment
December 13, 2002	Drumline	distribution only; produced by Fox 2000 Pictures and Wendy Finerman Productions

=== 2003 ===
Release date	Title	Notes
January 10, 2003	Just Married	co-production with Robert Simonds Productions
January 17, 2003	A Guy Thing	international theatrical distribution only; produced by Metro-Goldwyn-Mayer and David Ladd Films
February 14, 2003	Daredevil	distribution in all media excluding international television outside Switzerland and Korea only; co-production with Regency Enterprises, Marvel Enterprises, New Regency Productions and Horseshoe Bay Productions
March 14, 2003	Agent Cody Banks	international theatrical distribution outside Japan only; produced by Metro-Goldwyn-Mayer, Splendid Pictures, Maverick Films and Dylan Sellers Productions
April 4, 2003	Phone Booth	distribution only; produced by Fox 2000 Pictures and Zucker/Netter Productions
April 16, 2003	Chasing Papi	distribution only; produced by Fox 2000 Pictures and Spirit Dance Entertainment
May 2, 2003	X2	co-production with Marvel Enterprises, the Donners' Company and Bad Hat Harry Productions
May 16, 2003	Down with Love	distribution in all media excluding international television outside Italy and Switzerland only; produced by Fox 2000 Pictures, Regency Enterprises and the Jinks/Cohen Company
May 30, 2003	Wrong Turn	North American co-distribution with Regency Enterprises only; produced by Constantin Film, Summit Entertainment, McOne and Stan Winston Productions
June 20, 2003	From Justin to Kelly	co-production with 19 Entertainment
July 2, 2003	Legally Blonde 2: Red, White & Blonde	international theatrical distribution only; produced by Metro-Goldwyn-Mayer, Marc Platt Productions and Type A Films
July 11, 2003	The League of Extraordinary Gentlemen	co-production with Angry Films, International Production Company and JD Productions
August 15, 2003	Uptown Girls	international theatrical distribution only; produced by Metro-Goldwyn-Mayer and GreeneStreet Films
September 5, 2003	The Order	co-production with Baumgarten Merims Films
October 3, 2003	Out of Time	international theatrical distribution outside Latin America, the CIS, the Middle East, Israel, Japan, Indonesia, Thailand and Europe excluding France only; produced by Metro-Goldwyn-Mayer, Original Film and Monarch Pictures
October 10, 2003	Good Boy!	international theatrical distribution only; produced by Metro-Goldwyn-Mayer and Jim Henson Pictures
October 17, 2003	Runaway Jury	distribution in all media excluding international television outside Switzerland and Japan only; produced by Regency Enterprises and New Regency Productions
November 14, 2003	Master and Commander: The Far Side of the World	Nominee of the Academy Award for Best Picture. Nominee of the Golden Globe Award for Best Motion Picture – Drama. distribution outside Latin America, France, Italy and Japan only; co-production with Miramax Films, Universal Pictures and Samuel Goldwyn Films
December 12, 2003	Stuck on You	co-production with Conundrum Entertainment and Charles B. Wessler Productions
December 25, 2003	Cheaper by the Dozen	co-production with Robert Simonds Productions

=== 2004 ===
Release date	Title	Notes
February 6, 2004	Catch That Kid	distribution only; produced by Fox 2000 Pictures, Mad Chance Productions and Nimbus Film
February 6, 2004	Barbershop 2: Back in Business	international theatrical distribution only; produced by Metro-Goldwyn-Mayer, State Street Pictures and Cube Vision
February 20, 2004	Welcome to Mooseport	co-production with Intermedia Films
March 12, 2004	Agent Cody Banks 2: Destination London	international theatrical distribution only; produced by Metro-Goldwyn-Mayer, Splendid Pictures, Maverick Films and Dylan Sellers Productions
April 2, 2004	Walking Tall	international theatrical distribution outside Eastern Europe, the Baltics, the CIS, the Middle East, Turkey, Japan and Thailand only; produced by Metro-Goldwyn-Mayer, Hyde Park Entertainment, Mandeville Films and WWE Films
April 9, 2004	The Girl Next Door	distribution in all media excluding international television outside Switzerland only; produced by Regency Enterprises, New Regency Productions, Gordon/Gittes Productions and Daybreak
April 23, 2004	Man on Fire	distribution in all media excluding international television outside Germany, Austria, Switzerland and Japan only; produced by Fox 2000 Pictures, Regency Enterprises, New Regency Productions and Scott Free Productions
May 28, 2004	The Day After Tomorrow	co-production with Centropolis Entertainment, Lions Gate Films and the Mark Gordon Company
June 11, 2004	Garfield: The Movie	co-production with Davis Entertainment
June 18, 2004	DodgeBall: A True Underdog Story	co-production with Red Hour Productions
July 2, 2004	De-Lovely	international theatrical distribution only; produced by Metro-Goldwyn-Mayer and Winkler Films
July 16, 2004	I, Robot	co-production with Davis Entertainment, Laurence Mark Productions and Overbrook Films
August 13, 2004	Alien vs. Predator	co-production with Davis Entertainment and Brandywine Productions
September 3, 2004	Paparazzi	North American distribution only; produced by Icon Productions
September 24, 2004	First Daughter	distribution in all media excluding international television outside Switzerland only; produced by Regency Enterprises, New Regency Productions, Davis Entertainment and Spirit Dance Productions
October 6, 2004	Taxi	co-production with EuropaCorp and Robert Simonds Productions
December 17, 2004	Flight of the Phoenix	co-production with Aldrich Group and Davis Entertainment
December 25, 2004	Fat Albert	co-production with Davis Entertainment and SAH Enterprises

=== 2005 ===
Release date	Title	Notes
January 14, 2005	Elektra	distribution in all media excluding international television outside Germany, Austria and Switzerland only; co-production with Regency Enterprises, Marvel Enterprises, New Regency Productions and Horseshoe Bay Productions
January 28, 2005	Hide and Seek	co-production with Josephson Entertainment
February 18, 2005	Because of Winn-Dixie	co-production with Walden Media
March 4, 2005	Be Cool	international theatrical distribution only; produced by Metro-Goldwyn-Mayer, Jersey Films and Double Feature Films
March 11, 2005	Robots	co-production with 20th Century Fox Animation and Blue Sky Studios
March 25, 2005	Guess Who	international distribution in all media excluding television outside Germany, Austria and Switzerland only; produced by Regency Enterprises, Columbia Pictures, 3 Arts Entertainment, Tall Trees Productions and Katalyst Media; distributed in North America by Sony Pictures Releasing
April 8, 2005	Fever Pitch	distribution only; produced by Fox 2000 Pictures, Conundrum Entertainment, Gil Netter Productions, Wildgaze Films, Alan Greenspan Productions and Flower Films; remake of the 1997 film of the same name; titled The Perfect Catch in international territories
May 6, 2005	Kingdom of Heaven	co-production with Scott Free Productions and Inside Track; rights licensed to Pathé for France and Medusa Film for Italy
May 19, 2005	Star Wars: Episode III – Revenge of the Sith	distribution only; produced by Lucasfilm Ltd.
June 10, 2005	Mr. & Mrs. Smith	distribution in all media excluding international television outside France, Germany, Austria, Switzerland, Italy, Eastern Europe, the Baltics, the CIS, the Middle East, Turkey and Japan only; produced by Regency Enterprises, New Regency Productions, Summit Entertainment and Weed Road Pictures
July 1, 2005	Rebound	co-production with Robert Simonds Productions and Runteldat Entertainment
July 8, 2005	Fantastic Four	distribution outside Germany and Austria only; co-production with Constantin Film, Marvel Enterprises, 1492 Pictures and Bernd Eichinger Productions
August 17, 2005	Supercross	North American distribution only; produced by Tag Entertainment and Clear Channel Entertainment
September 2, 2005	Transporter 2	distribution outside France, Belgium, Luxembourg, Germany, Austria and Japan only; produced by EuropaCorp, TF1 Films Production, Current Entertainment, Canal+ and TPS Star
September 30, 2005	Little Manhattan	distribution in all media excluding international television outside Germany, Austria and Switzerland only; produced by Regency Enterprises, Pariah Films and New Regency Productions
September 30, 2005	Into the Blue	international theatrical distribution only; produced by Metro-Goldwyn-Mayer and Mandalay Pictures; distributed in North America by Columbia Pictures
October 7, 2005	In Her Shoes	distribution only; produced by Fox 2000 Pictures, Scott Free Productions and Deuce Three Productions
October 21, 2005	Stay	distribution in all media excluding international television outside Germany, Austria and Switzerland only; produced by Regency Enterprises and New Regency Productions
October 21, 2005	Shopgirl	Latin American, U.K., Irish, Australian, New Zealand and Asian distribution only; produced by Touchstone Pictures and Hyde Park Entertainment
November 18, 2005	Walk the Line	Winner of the Golden Globe Award for Best Motion Picture – Musical or Comedy. distribution only; produced by Fox 2000 Pictures, Konrad Pictures, Tree Line Films and Catfish Productions
November 23, 2005	In the Mix	international distribution only; produced by Lions Gate Films, J&C Entertainment and Ush Entertainment
December 16, 2005	The Family Stone	distribution only; produced by Fox 2000 Pictures and Michael London Productions
December 21, 2005	Cheaper by the Dozen 2	co-production with 21 Laps Entertainment

=== 2006 ===
Release date	Title	Notes
January 6, 2006	Grandma's Boy	North American, U.K., Irish, French and Italian distribution only; produced by Level 1 Entertainment and Happy Madison Productions
January 13, 2006	Tristan & Isolde	distribution in North America, the U.K., Ireland, Australia, New Zealand, South Africa, France, Italy, Spain and Asia excluding Korea only; produced by Scott Free Productions and Franchise Pictures (uncredited)
January 27, 2006	Big Momma's House 2	distribution in all media excluding international television outside Germany, Austria and Switzerland only; co-production with Regency Enterprises, Deep River Productions, Firm Films, Runteldat Entertainment and New Regency Productions
February 10, 2006	The Pink Panther	international theatrical distribution only; produced by Metro-Goldwyn-Mayer and Robert Simonds Productions; distributed in North America by Columbia Pictures
February 17, 2006	Date Movie	distribution in all media excluding international television outside Germany, Austria and Switzerland only; produced by Regency Enterprises and New Regency Productions
March 3, 2006	Aquamarine	distribution only; produced by Fox 2000 Pictures and Storefront Pictures
March 31, 2006	Ice Age: The Meltdown	co-production with 20th Century Fox Animation and Blue Sky Studios
April 21, 2006	The Sentinel	distribution in all media excluding international television outside Italy, Germany, Austria and Switzerland only; co-production with Regency Enterprises, Furthur Films and New Regency Productions
April 24, 2006	Perfect Creature	U.S. and select international distribution only; produced by Roc Media, Sensible Films and Spice Factory
May 12, 2006	Just My Luck	distribution in all media excluding international television outside Germany, Austria and Switzerland only; produced by Regency Enterprises, New Regency Productions and Cheyenne Enterprises
May 26, 2006	X-Men: The Last Stand	co-production with Marvel Entertainment and the Donners' Company
June 6, 2006	The Omen	—
June 16, 2006	Garfield: A Tail of Two Kitties	co-production with Davis Entertainment
June 30, 2006	The Devil Wears Prada	Nominee of the Golden Globe Award for Best Motion Picture – Musical or Comedy. distribution only; produced by Fox 2000 Pictures and Wendy Finerman Productions
July 21, 2006	My Super Ex-Girlfriend	distribution in all media excluding international television outside Germany, Austria and Switzerland only; produced by Regency Enterprises, New Regency Productions and Pariah Films
July 28, 2006	John Tucker Must Die	co-production with Landscape Productions and John US Productions
September 1, 2006	Idiocracy	co-production with Judgemental Films and Ternion
September 15, 2006	Everyone's Hero	North American distribution only; produced by IDT Entertainment
September 22, 2006	Bandidas	North and Latin American and Spanish distribution only; produced by EuropaCorp, TF1 Films Production, Canal+ and TPS Star
October 13, 2006	The Marine	distribution only; produced by WWE Films
October 20, 2006	Flicka	distribution only; produced by Fox 2000 Pictures and Zucker-Netter Productions
November 3, 2006	Borat: Cultural Learnings of America for Make Benefit Glorious Nation of Kazakhstan	Nominee of the Golden Globe Award for Best Motion Picture – Musical or Comedy. co-production with Four by Two Films and Everyman Pictures; co-distributed in Japan by GAGA
November 10, 2006	A Good Year	distribution only; produced by Fox 2000 Pictures and Scott Free Productions; rights licensed to Medusa Film for Italy and Kadokawa Pictures for Japan
November 22, 2006	Deck the Halls	distribution in all media excluding international television outside Germany, Austria and Switzerland only; produced by Regency Enterprises, New Regency Productions and Corduroy Films
November 22, 2006	The Fountain	international distribution in all media excluding television outside France, Germany, Austria and Switzerland only; produced by Regency Enterprises, Warner Bros. Pictures, Protozoa Pictures and New Regency Productions
December 1, 2006	Turistas	North American, Australian and New Zealand distribution under Fox Atomic only; produced by 2929 Entertainment, Stone Village Productions and BoZ Productions
December 15, 2006	Eragon	distribution only; produced by Fox 2000 Pictures and Davis Entertainment
December 20, 2006	Rocky Balboa	international theatrical and home media distribution outside Scandinavia, Portugal and Israel only; produced by Metro-Goldwyn-Mayer, Columbia Pictures, Revolution Studios and Chartoff/Winkler Productions
December 22, 2006	Night at the Museum	co-production with 1492 Pictures and 21 Laps Entertainment

=== 2007 ===
Release date	Title	Notes
January 26, 2007	Epic Movie	distribution in all media excluding international television outside Germany, Austria and Switzerland only; produced by Regency Enterprises, New Regency Productions and Schiff Productions
February 23, 2007	Reno 911!: Miami	North American distribution only; co-production with Paramount Pictures, Comedy Central Films, High Sierra Carpeting, Jersey Films, Double Feature Films and Principato-Young Entertainment
March 23, 2007	The Hills Have Eyes 2	distribution only; produced by Fox Atomic, Midnite Entertainment and Craven/Maddalena Films
April 4, 2007	Firehouse Dog	distribution in all media excluding international television outside Germany, Austria and Switzerland only; produced by Regency Enterprises and New Regency Productions
April 13, 2007	Pathfinder	distribution only; produced by Phoenix Pictures
May 11, 2007	28 Weeks Later	distribution only; produced by Fox Atomic, DNA Films, UK Film Council, Figment Films, Sogecine and Koan Films
June 15, 2007	Fantastic Four: Rise of the Silver Surfer	distribution outside Germany and Austria only; co-production with Constantin Film, Marvel Entertainment, 1492 Pictures and Bernd Eichinger Productions
June 27, 2007	Live Free or Die Hard	co-production with Cheyenne Enterprises
July 27, 2007	The Simpsons Movie	co-production with 20th Century Fox Animation, Gracie Films and Matt Groening Productions
August 31, 2007	Death Sentence	North American distribution only; produced by Hyde Park Entertainment and Baldwin Entertainment Group
October 5, 2007	The Seeker: The Dark is Rising	co-production with Walden Media and Marc Platt Productions
October 19, 2007	The Comebacks	distribution only; produced by Fox Atomic and Tapestry Films
November 9, 2007	Lions for Lambs	international theatrical distribution only; produced by Metro-Goldwyn-Mayer, United Artists, Wildwood Enterprises, Brat Na Pont and Andell Entertainment
November 16, 2007	Mr. Magorium's Wonder Emporium	North American distribution only; produced by Walden Media, Mandate Pictures and FilmColony
November 21, 2007	Hitman	distribution outside France only; co-production with EuropaCorp
December 14, 2007	Alvin and the Chipmunks	distribution in all media excluding international television only; produced by Fox 2000 Pictures, Regency Enterprises and Bagdasarian Productions
December 25, 2007	Aliens vs. Predator: Requiem	co-production with Davis Entertainment and Brandywine Productions

=== 2008 ===
Release date	Title	Notes
January 18, 2008	27 Dresses	distribution outside Scandinavia, Portugal, Greece, Cyprus, Poland, Hungary and Israel only; produced by Fox 2000 Pictures and Spyglass Entertainment
January 25, 2008	Meet the Spartans	distribution in all media excluding international television only; produced by Regency Enterprises, New Regency Productions and 3 in the Box
February 14, 2008	Jumper	distribution in all media excluding international television outside Germany, Austria and Switzerland only; co-production with Regency Enterprises, New Regency Productions and Hypnotic
March 14, 2008	Dr. Seuss' Horton Hears a Who!	co-production with 20th Century Fox Animation and Blue Sky Studios
March 21, 2008	Shutter	distribution in all media excluding international television only; produced by Regency Enterprises, New Regency Productions, Vertigo Entertainment and Ozla Pictures
April 4, 2008	Nim's Island	North American distribution only; produced by Walden Media
April 25, 2008	Deception	North American, Australian and New Zealand distribution only; produced by Media Rights Capital (uncredited), Rifkin/Eberts and Seed Productions
May 9, 2008	What Happens in Vegas	distribution in all media excluding international television only; co-production with Regency Enterprises, 21 Laps Entertainment, Mosaic Media Group and Penn Station Entertainment
June 13, 2008	The Happening (Note: Disney now owns worldwide rights to this film, having acquired the UTV catalog in 2013 and the 20th Century Fox library in 2019)	distribution outside India only; co-production with UTV Motion Pictures, Spyglass Entertainment and Blinding Edge Pictures
July 11, 2008	Meet Dave	distribution in all media excluding international television outside Germany, Austria and Switzerland only; co-production with Regency Enterprises, Friendly Films and Guy Walks Into a Bar Productions
July 18, 2008	Space Chimps (Note: Owned by Lionsgate)	North American distribution only; produced by Starz Animation, Odyssey Entertainment, Vanguard Animation, Arc Productions and Studiopolis
July 25, 2008	The X-Files: I Want to Believe	co-production with Ten Thirteen Productions and Crying Box Productions
August 15, 2008	Mirrors	distribution in all media excluding international television outside Germany, Austria and Switzerland only; produced by Regency Enterprises and New Regency Productions
August 20, 2008	The Rocker	distribution only; produced by Fox Atomic and 21 Laps Entertainment
August 29, 2008	Babylon A.D.	distribution in North and Latin America, the U.K., Ireland, Australia, New Zealand, South Africa, the Middle East, Israel and Asia only; produced by StudioCanal, One Race Films, M6 Films and Canal+
October 10, 2008	City of Ember	North American distribution only; produced by Walden Media and Playtone
October 17, 2008	Max Payne	co-production with Firm Films, Foxtor Productions and Depth Entertainment
November 26, 2008	Australia	co-production with Bazmark Films
December 12, 2008	The Day the Earth Stood Still	co-production with 3 Arts Entertainment
December 25, 2008	Marley & Me	distribution in all media excluding international television only; produced by Fox 2000 Pictures, Regency Enterprises, Gil Netter Productions and Sunswept Entertainment
December 25, 2008	Valkyrie	international theatrical distribution outside France, Italy and Japan and Spanish theatrical co-distribution with Wide Pictures only; produced by Metro-Goldwyn-Mayer, United Artists, Bad Hat Harry Productions and Cruise/Wagner Productions

=== 2009 ===
Release date	Title	Notes
January 9, 2009	Bride Wars	distribution in all media excluding international television only; produced by Fox 2000 Pictures, Regency Enterprises, New Regency Productions, Birdie Productions and Riche/Ludwig Productions
January 30, 2009	Taken	distribution in North and Latin America, the U.K., Ireland, Australia, New Zealand, South Africa, Germany, Austria, Switzerland, Italy, Spain, the CIS, Hong Kong and Japan only; produced by EuropaCorp, M6 Films, Grive Productions, Canal+, M6 and TPS Star
February 27, 2009	Street Fighter: The Legend of Chun-Li	North American distribution only; produced by Hyde Park Entertainment, Capcom and Adlabs Films
March 27, 2009	12 Rounds	distribution under Fox Atomic only; produced by WWE Studios and the Mark Gordon Company
April 10, 2009	Dragonball Evolution	co-production with Star Overseas and Big Screen Productions
May 1, 2009	X-Men Origins: Wolverine	co-production with Marvel Entertainment, the Donners' Company and Seed Productions
May 22, 2009	Night at the Museum: Battle of the Smithsonian	co-production with 21 Laps Entertainment and 1492 Pictures
July 1, 2009	Ice Age: Dawn of the Dinosaurs	co-production with 20th Century Fox Animation and Blue Sky Studios
July 10, 2009	I Love You, Beth Cooper	co-production with 1492 Pictures and the Bridge Studios; originally produced under Fox Atomic
July 31, 2009	Aliens in the Attic	distribution in all media excluding international television only; co-production with Regency Enterprises and Josephson Entertainment
August 21, 2009	Post Grad	distribution only; produced by Cold Spring Pictures and the Montecito Picture Company; originally produced under Fox Atomic
September 4, 2009	All About Steve	distribution only; produced by Fox 2000 Pictures, Radar Pictures and Fortis Films
September 18, 2009	Jennifer's Body	originally produced under Fox Atomic; co-distributed in Japan by Showgate
November 13, 2009	Fantastic Mr. Fox	Nominee of the Academy Award for Best Animated Feature. distribution in all media excluding international television only; co-production with 20th Century Fox Animation, Indian Paintbrush, Regency Enterprises and American Empirical Pictures; co-distributed in Japan by Showgate
December 18, 2009	Avatar	Nominee of the Academy Award for Best Picture. Winner of the Golden Globe Award for Best Motion Picture – Drama. co-production with Lightstorm Entertainment
December 23, 2009	Alvin and the Chipmunks: The Squeakquel	distribution in all media excluding international television only; produced by Fox 2000 Pictures, Regency Enterprises and Bagdasarian Productions

== 2010s ==
=== 2010 ===
Release date	Title	Notes
January 22, 2010	Tooth Fairy	co-production with Walden Media, Mayhem Pictures and Blumhouse Productions
February 12, 2010	Percy Jackson & the Olympians: The Lightning Thief	distribution only; produced by Fox 2000 Pictures, 1492 Pictures and Sunswept Entertainment
February 12, 2010	My Name Is Khan	international distribution outside Scandinavia and Asia excluding Japan only; produced by Fox Star Studios, Dharma Productions, Red Chillies Entertainment and Imagenation Abu Dhabi; distributed in North America by Fox Searchlight Pictures
March 19, 2010	Diary of a Wimpy Kid	distribution only; produced by Fox 2000 Pictures and Color Force
April 9, 2010	Date Night	co-production with 21 Laps Entertainment
June 4, 2010	Marmaduke	distribution in all media excluding international digital and television only; co-production with Regency Enterprises and Davis Entertainment
June 11, 2010	The A-Team	co-production with Cannell Studios, Top Cow Productions and Scott Free Productions
June 23, 2010	Knight and Day	distribution in all media excluding international digital and television only; co-production with Regency Enterprises, Pink Machine, Todd Garner Productions and Tree Line Film
July 9, 2010	Predators	co-production with Troublemaker Studios and Davis Entertainment
July 23, 2010	Ramona and Beezus	distribution only; produced by Fox 2000 Pictures, Walden Media and Di Novi Pictures
August 18, 2010	Vampires Suck	distribution in all media excluding international digital and television only; produced by Regency Enterprises, New Regency Productions and 3 in a Box
September 3, 2010	Machete	North American distribution only; produced by Overnight Films and Troublemaker Studios
September 24, 2010	Wall Street: Money Never Sleeps	co-production with Edward R. Pressman Productions
November 12, 2010	Unstoppable	co-production with Prospect Park and Scott Free Productions
November 24, 2010	Love & Other Drugs	distribution in all media excluding international digital and television outside Italy only; produced by Fox 2000 Pictures, Regency Enterprises, New Regency Productions, Stuber Pictures and Bedford Falls Productions
December 10, 2010	The Chronicles of Narnia: The Voyage of the Dawn Treader	distribution only; produced by Fox 2000 Pictures and Walden Media
December 25, 2010	Gulliver's Travels	co-production with Davis Entertainment

=== 2011 ===
Release date	Title	Notes
February 18, 2011	Big Mommas: Like Father Like Son	distribution in all media excluding international digital and television only; produced by Regency Enterprises, New Regency Productions, Friendly Films, Runteldat Entertainment and the Collective
March 25, 2011	Diary of a Wimpy Kid: Rodrick Rules	distribution only; produced by Fox 2000 Pictures and Color Force
April 15, 2011	Rio	co-production with 20th Century Fox Animation and Blue Sky Studios
April 22, 2011	Water for Elephants	distribution only; produced by Fox 2000 Pictures, 3 Arts Entertainment, Gil Netter Productions, Flashpoint Entertainment and Big Screen Productions; co-distributed in Japan by SPO Entertainment
June 3, 2011	X-Men: First Class	co-production with Marvel Entertainment, Bad Hat Harry Productions and the Donners' Company
June 17, 2011	Mr. Popper's Penguins	co-production with Davis Entertainment
July 1, 2011	Monte Carlo	distribution in all media excluding international digital and television only; produced by Fox 2000 Pictures, Regency Enterprises, Di Novi Pictures and Blossom Films
August 5, 2011	Rise of the Planet of the Apes	co-production with Chernin Entertainment
August 12, 2011	Glee: The 3D Concert Movie	co-production with Ryan Murphy Productions
September 30, 2011	What's Your Number?	distribution in all media excluding international digital and television only; produced by Regency Enterprises, New Regency Productions and Contrafilm
October 14, 2011	The Big Year	distribution only; produced by Fox 2000 Pictures, Everest Entertainment, Red Hour Productions, Deuce Three Productions and Sunswept Entertainment; co-distributed in Japan by SPO Entertainment
October 28, 2011	In Time	distribution in all media excluding international digital and television outside Italy only; produced by Regency Enterprises, New Regency Productions and Strike Entertainment
December 9, 2011	The Sitter	co-production with Michael De Luca Productions and Rough House Pictures
December 16, 2011	Alvin and the Chipmunks: Chipwrecked	distribution in all media excluding international digital and television only; produced by Fox 2000 Pictures, Regency Enterprises and Bagdasarian Productions
December 21, 2011	We Bought a Zoo	co-production with LBI Entertainment and Vinyl Films
December 25, 2011	The Darkest Hour	international distribution in all media excluding digital and television only; produced by Regency Enterprises, Summit Entertainment, the Jacobson Company, Bazelevs Company and New Regency Productions

=== 2012 ===
Release date	Title	Notes
January 20, 2012	Red Tails	distribution outside the U.K., Ireland, Germany and Austria only; produced by Lucasfilm Ltd.
February 3, 2012	Chronicle	co-production with Davis Entertainment
February 17, 2012	This Means War	co-production with Overbrook Entertainment and Robert Simonds Productions
April 13, 2012	The Three Stooges	co-production with Conundrum Entertainment, Charles B. Wessler Entertainment and C3 Entertainment
June 8, 2012	Prometheus	co-production with Scott Free Productions and Brandywine Productions
June 22, 2012	Abraham Lincoln: Vampire Hunter	co-production with Tim Burton Productions, Bazelevs Company and Lemley Productions
July 13, 2012	Ice Age: Continental Drift	co-production with 20th Century Fox Animation and Blue Sky Studios
July 27, 2012	The Watch	co-production with 21 Laps Entertainment
August 3, 2012	Diary of a Wimpy Kid: Dog Days	distribution only; produced by Fox 2000 Pictures and Color Force
September 28, 2012	Won't Back Down	North American distribution only; produced by Walden Media and Gran Via Productions
October 5, 2012	Taken 2	distribution outside France, Germany, Austria, Switzerland, the Benelux, Scandinavia, Eastern Europe, the Baltics, the CIS and the Middle East only; produced by EuropaCorp, M6 Films, Grive Productions, Canal+, M6 and Ciné+
October 26, 2012	Chasing Mavericks	North American, French and Spanish distribution only; produced by Fox 2000 Pictures, Walden Media, Gran Via Productions and Deuce Three Productions
November 16, 2012	Lincoln	Nominee of the Academy Award for Best Picture and the Golden Globe Award for Best Motion Picture – Drama. international distribution outside India only; co-production with DreamWorks Pictures, Reliance Entertainment, Participant Media, Amblin Entertainment and the Kennedy/Marshall Company; distributed in North America by Touchstone Pictures through Walt Disney Studios Motion Pictures
November 21, 2012	Life of Pi	Nominee of the Academy Award for Best Picture and the Golden Globe Award for Best Motion Picture – Drama. distribution only; produced by Fox 2000 Pictures, Haishang Films and Gil Netter Productions
December 25, 2012	Parental Guidance	co-production with Walden Media, Chernin Entertainment and Face Productions

=== 2013 ===
Release date	Title	Notes
January 18, 2013	Broken City	U.S. and Italian distribution only; produced by Regency Enterprises, Emmett/Furla Films, Black Bear Pictures, New Regency Productions, Closest to the Hole Productions, Leverage Entertainment, Allen Hughes Productions, Envision Entertainment and 1984 Private Defense Contractors
February 14, 2013	A Good Day to Die Hard	co-production with Giant Pictures
March 22, 2013	The Croods (Note: Owned by Universal Pictures (via DreamWorks Animation))	distribution outside the U.S. on television and select digital media, China, Korea and Vietnam only; produced by DreamWorks Animation; first DreamWorks Animation film to be distributed by 20th Century Fox
May 24, 2013	Epic	co-production with 20th Century Fox Animation and Blue Sky Studios
June 7, 2013	The Internship	distribution in all media excluding international digital and television only; co-production with Regency Enterprises, Wild West Picture Show Productions and 21 Laps Entertainment
June 28, 2013	The Heat	co-production with Chernin Entertainment and Big Screen Productions
July 17, 2013	Turbo	distribution outside the U.S. on television and select digital media, China, Korea and Vietnam only; produced by DreamWorks Animation
July 26, 2013	The Wolverine	co-production with Marvel Entertainment and the Donners' Company
August 7, 2013	Percy Jackson: Sea of Monsters	distribution only; produced by Fox 2000 Pictures, Sunswept Entertainment and 1492 Pictures
October 4, 2013	Runner Runner	distribution in all media excluding international digital and television outside Japan only; produced by Regency Enterprises, New Regency Productions, Appian Way Productions and Double Feature Films
October 25, 2013	The Counselor	distribution only; produced by Fox 2000 Pictures, Scott Free Productions, Nick Wechsler Productions and Chockstone Pictures
November 8, 2013	The Book Thief	distribution only; produced by Fox 2000 Pictures, Sunswept Entertainment and Studio Babelsberg
December 20, 2013	Walking with Dinosaurs	distribution outside Canada, Germany, Austria, Switzerland, the Benelux, Spain, Taiwan and India only; produced by Reliance Entertainment, BBC Earth Films and Evergreen Studios
December 25, 2013	The Secret Life of Walter Mitty	co-production with Samuel Goldwyn Films, Red Hour Productions, New Line Cinema and Blind Wink

=== 2014 ===
Release date	Title	Notes
January 17, 2014	Devil's Due	co-production with Davis Entertainment and Radio Silence Productions; co-distributed in Japan by Kinema Junpo
February 7, 2014	The Monuments Men	international distribution only; produced by Fox 2000 Pictures, Columbia Pictures, Smokehouse Pictures and Studio Babelsberg; rights licensed to Presidio Corporation for Japan; distributed in North America by Sony Pictures Releasing
February 28, 2014	Son of God (Note: Co-owned by MGM)	home media and North American theatrical and television distribution only; produced by Lightworkers Media
March 7, 2014	Mr. Peabody & Sherman	distribution outside the U.S. on television and select digital media, China, Korea and Vietnam only; produced by DreamWorks Animation, PDI/DreamWorks and Bullwinkle Studios
April 11, 2014	Rio 2	co-production with 20th Century Fox Animation and Blue Sky Studios
April 25, 2014	The Other Woman	co-production with LBI Entertainment
May 23, 2014	X-Men: Days of Future Past	co-production with Marvel Entertainment, Bad Hat Harry Productions, the Donners' Company and Genre Films
June 6, 2014	The Fault in Our Stars	distribution only; produced by Fox 2000 Pictures and Temple Hill Entertainment
June 13, 2014	How to Train Your Dragon 2	distribution outside the U.S. on television and select digital media, China, Korea and Vietnam only; produced by DreamWorks Animation
July 11, 2014	Dawn of the Planet of the Apes	co-production with Chernin Entertainment
August 13, 2014	Let's Be Cops	co-production with Kinberg Genre
September 19, 2014	The Maze Runner	co-production with Gotham Group and Temple Hill Entertainment
October 3, 2014	Gone Girl	distribution in all media excluding international digital and television only; co-production with Regency Enterprises
October 17, 2014	The Book of Life	co-production with 20th Century Fox Animation, Reel FX Animation Studios, Chatrone and Mexopolis
November 26, 2014	Penguins of Madagascar	distribution outside the U.S. on television and select digital media, China, Korea and Vietnam only; produced by DreamWorks Animation and PDI/DreamWorks
December 5, 2014	The Pyramid	co-production with Fox International Productions, Silvatar Media and Atmosphere Pictures
December 12, 2014	Exodus: Gods and Kings	co-production with Chernin Entertainment, Scott Free Productions and Babieka and Volcano Films
December 19, 2014	Night at the Museum: Secret of the Tomb	co-production with 21 Laps Entertainment and 1492 Pictures

=== 2015 ===
Release date	Title	Notes
January 9, 2015	Taken 3	distribution outside France, Germany, Austria, Switzerland, the Benelux, Scandinavia, Eastern Europe, the Baltics, the Middle East and China only; produced by EuropaCorp, M6 Films, Canal+, M6 and Ciné+
February 13, 2015	Kingsman: The Secret Service	co-production with Marv Films and Cloudy Productions; rights licensed to Kadokawa for Japan
March 6, 2015	Unfinished Business	distribution in all media excluding international digital and television only; produced by Regency Enterprises, Escape Artists and New Regency Productions
March 27, 2015	Home	distribution outside the U.S. on television and select digital media, China, Korea and Vietnam only; produced by DreamWorks Animation
April 10, 2015	The Longest Ride	distribution only; produced by Fox 2000 Pictures and Temple Hill Entertainment
May 22, 2015	Poltergeist	distribution in all media excluding international digital and television outside Scandinavia, Portugal, Poland, Hungary, Romania, Bulgaria, the Czech Republic, Slovakia, the Middle East and Israel only; produced by Fox 2000 Pictures, Metro-Goldwyn-Mayer, Ghost House Pictures and Vertigo Entertainment
May 29, 2015	Aloha	international distribution in all media excluding digital and television only; produced by Regency Enterprises, Columbia Pictures, RatPac Entertainment, Scott Rudin Productions and Vinyl Films; distributed in North America by Sony Pictures Releasing
June 5, 2015	Spy	co-production with Chernin Entertainment and Feigco Entertainment
July 24, 2015	Paper Towns	distribution only; produced by Fox 2000 Pictures and Temple Hill Entertainment
August 7, 2015	Fantastic Four	distribution outside Germany and Austria only; co-production with Constantin Film, Marvel Entertainment, Marv Films and Kinberg Genre
August 21, 2015	Hitman: Agent 47	co-production with Daybreak Films and Giant Pictures
September 18, 2015	Maze Runner: The Scorch Trials	co-production with Temple Hill Entertainment and Gotham Group
October 2, 2015	The Martian	Nominee of the Academy Award for Best Picture. Winner of the Golden Globe Award for Best Motion Picture – Musical or Comedy. co-production with Scott Free Productions and Kinberg Genre
October 16, 2015	Bridge of Spies	Nominee of the Academy Award for Best Picture. international distribution outside India only; produced by Fox 2000 Pictures, DreamWorks Pictures, Reliance Entertainment, Participant Media, Afterworks Limited, Studio Babelsberg, Amblin Entertainment and Marc Platt Productions; distributed in North America by Touchstone Pictures through Walt Disney Studios Motion Pictures
November 6, 2015	The Peanuts Movie	co-production with 20th Century Fox Animation and Blue Sky Studios
November 25, 2015	Victor Frankenstein	co-production with Davis Entertainment
December 18, 2015	Alvin and the Chipmunks: The Road Chip	distribution in all media excluding international digital and television only; produced by Fox 2000 Pictures, Regency Enterprises and Bagdasarian Productions
December 25, 2015	Joy	Nominee of the Golden Globe Award for Best Motion Picture – Musical or Comedy. distribution only; produced by Fox 2000 Pictures, Annapurna Pictures, Davis Entertainment and 10 by 10 Entertainment
December 25, 2015	The Revenant	Nominee of the Academy Award for Best Picture. Winner of the Golden Globe Award for Best Motion Picture – Drama distribution in all media excluding international digital and television outside China, Hong Kong and Taiwan only; produced by Regency Enterprises, RatPac Entertainment, New Regency Productions, Anonymous Content, M Productions, Alpha Pictures and Appian Way Productions

=== 2016 ===
Release date	Title	Notes
January 29, 2016	Kung Fu Panda 3	distribution outside the U.S. on television and select digital media, China, Korea and Vietnam only; produced by DreamWorks Animation, China Film Group Corporation, Oriental DreamWorks and Zhong Ming You Ying Film
February 12, 2016	Deadpool	co-production with Marvel Entertainment, Kinberg Genre and the Donners' Company
February 26, 2016	Eddie the Eagle	distribution outside the U.K. and Ireland only; produced by Marv, Saville Productions and Studio Babelsberg; distributed in the U.K. and Ireland by Lionsgate
March 4, 2016	The Other Side of the Door	co-production with 42 and Fire Axe Pictures
May 27, 2016	X-Men: Apocalypse	co-production with Marvel Entertainment, Bad Hat Harry Productions, Kinberg Genre and the Donners' Company
June 24, 2016	Independence Day: Resurgence	co-production with Centropolis Entertainment and Electric Entertainment
July 8, 2016	Mike and Dave Need Wedding Dates	co-production with Chernin Entertainment
July 22, 2016	Ice Age: Collision Course	co-production with 20th Century Fox Animation and Blue Sky Studios
September 2, 2016	Morgan	co-production with Scott Free Productions
September 30, 2016	Miss Peregrine's Home for Peculiar Children	co-production with Chernin Entertainment and Tim Burton Productions
October 21, 2016	Keeping Up with the Joneses	distribution only; produced by Fox 2000 Pictures and Parkes+MacDonald Image Nation
November 4, 2016	Trolls	distribution outside the U.S. on television and select digital media, China, Korea and Vietnam only; produced by DreamWorks Animation
November 23, 2016	Rules Don't Apply	distribution in all media excluding international digital and television only; produced by Regency Enterprises, RatPac Entertainment, Worldview Entertainment, Considered Entertainment, Robson Orr Entertainment, Shangri-La Entertainment, Fiore Group, Demarest Films, Windsor Media and Tatira
December 21, 2016	Assassin's Creed	distribution in all media excluding international digital and television outside China, Hong Kong and Taiwan only; produced by Regency Enterprises, Ubisoft Motion Pictures, New Regency Productions, DMC Film and the Kennedy/Marshall Company
December 23, 2016	Why Him?	co-production with Red Hour Productions, 21 Laps Entertainment and 75 Year Plan Productions
December 25, 2016	Hidden Figures	distribution only; produced by Fox 2000 Pictures, Chernin Entertainment and Levantine Films

=== 2017 ===
Release date	Title	Notes
February 17, 2017	A Cure for Wellness	distribution in all media excluding international digital and television only; produced by Regency Enterprises, Blind Wink Productions and New Regency Productions
March 3, 2017	Logan	co-production with Marvel Entertainment, Kinberg Genre, Hutch Parker Productions and the Donners' Company
March 31, 2017	The Boss Baby	distribution outside the U.S. on television and select digital media, Japan, Korea and Vietnam only; produced by DreamWorks Animation
May 12, 2017	Snatched	co-production with Chernin Entertainment and Feigco Entertainment
May 19, 2017	Diary of a Wimpy Kid: The Long Haul	distribution only; produced by Fox 2000 Pictures and Color Force
May 19, 2017	Alien: Covenant	co-production with Scott Free Productions and Brandywine Productions
June 2, 2017	Captain Underpants: The First Epic Movie	distribution outside the U.S. on television and select digital media, Korea and Vietnam only; produced by DreamWorks Animation; last DreamWorks Animation film to be distributed by 20th Century Fox
July 14, 2017	War for the Planet of the Apes	co-production with Chernin Entertainment
September 22, 2017	Kingsman: The Golden Circle	co-production with Marv and Cloudy Productions
October 6, 2017	The Mountain Between Us	distribution only; produced by Fox 2000 Pictures and Chernin Entertainment
November 10, 2017	Murder on the Orient Express	co-production with Kinberg Genre, the Mark Gordon Company and Scott Free Productions
December 15, 2017	Ferdinand	co-production with 20th Century Fox Animation, Blue Sky Studios and Davis Entertainment
December 20, 2017	The Greatest Showman	co-production with Laurence Mark Productions and Chernin Entertainment
December 22, 2017	The Post	Nominee of the Academy Award for Best Picture. North American distribution only; co-production with DreamWorks Pictures, Reliance Entertainment, Participant Media, Amblin Entertainment, Pascal Pictures and Star Thrower Entertainment

=== 2018 ===
Release date	Title	Notes
January 26, 2018	Maze Runner: The Death Cure	co-production with Gotham Group, Temple Hill Entertainment and Oddball Entertainment
March 2, 2018	Red Sparrow	co-production with Film Rights Productions and Chernin Entertainment
March 16, 2018	Love, Simon	distribution only; produced by Fox 2000 Pictures and Temple Hill Entertainment
March 23, 2018	Unsane	Canadian and international distribution in all media excluding digital and television only; produced by Regency Enterprises, Fingerprint Releasing, New Regency Productions and Extension 765; distributed in the U.S. by Bleecker Street
May 18, 2018	Deadpool 2	co-production with Marvel Entertainment, Kinberg Genre, Maximum Effort and the Donners' Company
August 3, 2018	The Darkest Minds	co-production with 21 Laps Entertainment
September 14, 2018	The Predator	co-production with Davis Entertainment
October 12, 2018	Bad Times at the El Royale	co-production with Goddard Textiles
October 19, 2018	The Hate U Give	distribution only; produced by Fox 2000 Pictures, Temple Hill Entertainment and State Street Pictures
November 2, 2018	Bohemian Rhapsody	Nominee of the Academy Award for Best Picture. distribution in all media excluding international digital and television only; co-production with Regency Enterprises and GK Films
November 16, 2018	Widows	distribution in all media excluding international digital and television only; co-production with Regency Enterprises, Film4, New Regency Productions, See-Saw Films and Lammas Park Productions

=== 2019 ===
Release date	Title	Notes
January 25, 2019	The Kid Who Would Be King	co-production with Working Title Films and Big Talk Productions
February 8, 2019	Lords of Chaos	studio credit only; distributed by Gunpowder & Sky
February 14, 2019	Alita: Battle Angel	co-production with Lightstorm Entertainment and Troublemaker Studios
April 17, 2019	Breakthrough	distribution only; produced by Fox 2000 Pictures, Franklin Entertainment and Unanimous Media
June 7, 2019	Dark Phoenix	co-production with Marvel Entertainment, Kinberg Genre, Hutch Parker Entertainment and the Donners' Company
July 12, 2019	Stuber	co-production with GoldDay Productions
August 9, 2019	The Art of Racing in the Rain	distribution only; produced by Fox 2000 Pictures, Original Film, Shifting Gears Productions and Starbucks Entertainment
September 20, 2019	Ad Astra	distribution in all media excluding international digital and television outside China, Hong Kong and Taiwan only; co-production with Regency Enterprises, Bona Film Group, New Regency Productions, Plan B Entertainment, Keep Your Head Productions, RT Features and MadRiver Pictures
November 1, 2019	Terminator: Dark Fate	international distribution outside China only; co-production with Paramount Pictures, Skydance, Tencent Pictures and Lightstorm Entertainment
November 15, 2019	Ford v Ferrari	Nominee of the Academy Award for Best Picture. co-production with Chernin Entertainment and Turnpike Films
December 25, 2019	Spies in Disguise	co-production with 20th Century Fox Animation, Blue Sky Studios and Chernin Entertainment

== 2020s ==
=== 2020 ===
Release date	Title	Notes
January 10, 2020	Underwater	co-production with Chernin Entertainment
October 23, 2020	The Empty Man (Note: Although the film's marketing uses the then-recent 20th Century Studios rebranding, the film uses the Fox logo and credit text "Twentieth Century Fox presents".)	co-production with Boom! Studios

== See also ==
- List of 20th Century Fox films (1935–1999)
- List of 20th Century Studios films
- List of Searchlight Pictures films
- 20th Century Studios
- Searchlight Pictures
- Category:Lists of films by studio
