= Lists of 20th Century Studios films =

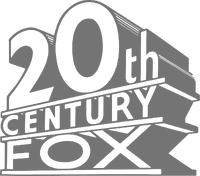
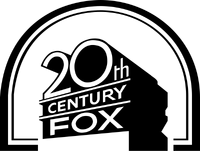
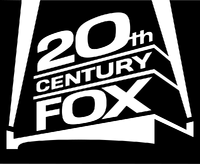
Evolution of 20th Century logos throughout the years

The following are lists of 20th Century Studios films by decade.

== Lists ==
=== Predecessors ===
- List of Fox Film films (1914–1935)
- List of Twentieth Century Pictures films (1933–1935)

=== As 20th Century Fox ===
- List of 20th Century Fox films (1935–1999)
- List of 20th Century Fox films (2000–2020)

==== International releases ====
- List of 20th Century Fox International films

=== As 20th Century Studios ===
- List of 20th Century Studios films (2020—present)
