= Claudia Eisinger =

German actress (born 1984)

- Born: 22 September 1984 (age 41); East Berlin, East Germany
- Occupation: Actress
- Years active: 2006-present

Claudia Eisinger (born 22 September 1984) is a German actress. She appeared in more than thirty films since 2006.

== Selected filmography ==
Year	Title	Role	Notes
2009	13 Semester		
2011	Blutzbrüdaz		
2016	Too Hard to Handle		
