= List of 20th Century Studios films =

This is a list of films produced by 20th Century Studios since 2020.

All films listed are theatrical releases unless specified.

- Films labelled with a ‡ are streaming releases through Disney+, Hulu or the Star content hub/Star+ until 2024 when Star+ was discontinued.
- Films labelled with a * symbol are streaming releases by a third-party.

== Released ==
Release date	Title	Notes
February 21, 2020	The Call of the Wild	co-production with 3 Arts Entertainment; first film released under the 20th Century Studios name
August 28, 2020	The New Mutants	co-production with Marvel Entertainment, Genre Films and Sunswept Entertainment
May 14, 2021	The Woman in the Window *	co-production with Fox 2000 Pictures and Scott Rudin Productions; final Fox 2000 Pictures film; distributed by Netflix
August 13, 2021	Free Guy	co-production with 21 Laps Entertainment, Maximum Effort, Berlanti Productions and Lit Entertainment Group
August 27, 2021	Vacation Friends ‡	co-production with Broken Road Productions; distributed by Hulu in the United States, Star+ in Latin America, and Disney+ internationally via Star
October 15, 2021	The Last Duel	co-production with Scott Free Productions and Pearl Street Films
October 22, 2021	Ron's Gone Wrong	co-production with 20th Century Animation and Locksmith Animation; first animated film released under the 20th Century Studios name
November 12, 2021	Home Sweet Home Alone ‡	co-production with Hutch Parker Entertainment; distributed by Disney+
December 3, 2021	Diary of a Wimpy Kid ‡	uncredited; co-production with 20th Century Animation and Bardel Entertainment; distributed by Disney+ under Walt Disney Pictures
December 10, 2021	West Side Story	co-production with Amblin Entertainment; nominee of the Academy Award for Best Picture and winner of Golden Globe Award for Best Motion Picture – Musical or Comedy
December 22, 2021	The King's Man	co-production with Marv Studios and Cloudy Productions
January 28, 2022	The Ice Age Adventures of Buck Wild ‡	uncredited; co-production with 20th Century Animation and Bardel Entertainment; distributed by Disney+ under Walt Disney Pictures
February 11, 2022	Death on the Nile	co-production with Genre Films, The Mark Gordon Company and Scott Free Productions
February 25, 2022	No Exit ‡	co-production with Flitcraft; distributed by Hulu in the United States, Star+ in Latin America, and Disney+ internationally via Star
March 18, 2022	Cheaper by the Dozen ‡	copyright holder only; produced by Walt Disney Pictures and Khalabo Ink Society; distributed by Disney+
March 18, 2022	Deep Water ‡ *	uncredited; co-production with Regency Enterprises, New Regency Productions, Entertainment One, Film Rites, Entertainment 360 and Keep Your Head; distributed by Hulu in the United States and Amazon Prime Video internationally
April 1, 2022	Better Nate Than Ever ‡	copyright holder only; produced by Walt Disney Pictures, 20th Century Family and Marc Platt Productions; distributed by Disney+
May 27, 2022	The Bob's Burgers Movie	co-production with 20th Century Animation, Bento Box Entertainment and Wilo Productions
July 1, 2022	The Princess ‡	co-production with Original Film and 87Eleven Entertainment; distributed by Hulu in the United States, Star+ in Latin America, and Disney+ internationally via Star
August 5, 2022	Prey ‡	co-production with Lawrence Gordon Productions and Davis Entertainment; distributed by Hulu in the United States, Star+ in Latin America, and Disney+ internationally via Star
September 9, 2022	Barbarian	distribution only; produced by Regency Enterprises, Almost Never Films, Hammerstone Studios, Vertigo Entertainment and Boulderlight Pictures
September 9, 2022	Brahmāstra: Part One – Shiva	North American distribution only; co-production with Dharma Productions, Prime Focus and Starlight Pictures; distributed by Star Studios in India and Walt Disney Studios Motion Pictures internationally through Buena Vista International (except Latin America and Europe)
October 7, 2022	Amsterdam	distribution only; produced by Regency Enterprises, DreamCrew, Keep Your Head Productions, Corazon Hayagriva, Forest Hill Entertainment and Canterbury Glass Productions
October 7, 2022	Hellraiser ‡ *	uncredited; co-production with Spyglass Media Group, Phantom Four Films and 247Hub; distributed by Hulu in the United States and Paramount Pictures internationally
October 14, 2022	Rosaline ‡	co-production with 21 Laps Entertainment; distributed by Hulu in the United States, Star+ in Latin America, and Disney+ internationally via Star
December 2, 2022	Darby and the Dead ‡	co-production with Footprint Features; distributed by Hulu in the United States, Star+ in Latin America, and Disney+ internationally via Star
December 2, 2022	Diary of a Wimpy Kid: Rodrick Rules ‡	copyright holder only; produced by Walt Disney Pictures; distributed by Disney+
December 9, 2022	Night at the Museum: Kahmunrah Rises Again ‡	copyright holder only; co-production with 21 Laps Entertainment, Alibaba Pictures and Atomic Cartoons; distributed by Disney+ under Walt Disney Pictures
December 16, 2022	Avatar: The Way of Water	co-production with Lightstorm Entertainment; nominee of the Academy Award for Best Picture
January 19, 2023	Fervo	copyright holder only; co-production with Star Original Productions, Movie and TF1 Studio (Note: In promotional material of Fervo, 20th Century Studios appears as copyright holder, as Star Distribution Brazil (formerly known as Buena Vista International Brazil) distributes the movie.)
March 17, 2023	Boston Strangler ‡	co-production with Scott Free Productions and LuckyChap Entertainment; distributed by Hulu, Star+ in Latin America, and Disney+ internationally via Star
May 12, 2023	Crater ‡	copyright holder only; produced by Walt Disney Pictures and 21 Laps Entertainment; distributed by Disney+
May 19, 2023	White Men Can't Jump ‡	co-production with Khalabo Ink Society and Mortal Media; distributed by Hulu in the United States, Disney+ internationally via Star, and Star+ in Latin America
June 2, 2023	The Boogeyman	co-production with 21 Laps Entertainment and NeoReel
August 25, 2023	Vacation Friends 2 ‡	co-production with Broken Road Productions; distributed by Hulu in the United States, Star+ in Latin America, and Disney+ internationally via Star
September 15, 2023	A Haunting in Venice	co-production with Kinberg Genre, Mark Gordon Pictures and Scott Free Productions
September 22, 2023	No One Will Save You ‡	co-production with Star Thrower Entertainment; distributed by Hulu in the United States, Star+ in Latin America, and Disney+ internationally via Star
September 29, 2023	The Creator	distribution only; produced by Regency Enterprises, Entertainment One and Bad Dreams
November 3, 2023	Quiz Lady ‡	co-production with Gloria Sanchez Productions and Artists First; distributed by Hulu in the United States, Star+ in Latin America, and Disney+ internationally via Star
December 8, 2023	Diary of a Wimpy Kid Christmas: Cabin Fever ‡	copyright holder only; produced by Walt Disney Pictures; distributed by Disney+
April 5, 2024	The First Omen	co-production with Phantom Four Films
May 10, 2024	Kingdom of the Planet of the Apes	co-production with Chernin Entertainment (Note: Uncredited), Oddball Entertainment and Jason T. Reed Productions
July 26, 2024	Deadpool & Wolverine	copyright holder only; produced by Marvel Studios, Maximum Effort and 21 Laps Entertainment
August 16, 2024	Alien: Romulus	co-production with Brandywine Productions, Scott Free Productions and Bad Hombre
April 11, 2025	The Amateur	co-production with Hutch Parker Entertainment
June 6, 2025	Predator: Killer of Killers ‡	co-production with 20th Century Animation, The Third Floor, Inc. and Davis Entertainment; distributed by Hulu in the United States and Disney+ internationally via Star
July 25, 2025	The Fantastic Four: First Steps	copyright holder only; produced by Marvel Studios
August 22, 2025	Eenie Meanie ‡	co-production with Reese/Wernick Productions; distributed by Hulu in the United States and Disney+ internationally
September 19, 2025	Swiped ‡	co-production with Ethea Entertainment; distributed by Hulu in the United States and Disney+ internationally; final film to be released under the Star hub outside of the United States
October 22, 2025	The Hand That Rocks the Cradle ‡	co-production with Radar Pictures and Department M; distributed by Hulu in the United States and Disney+ internationally; first film to be released under the Hulu hub outside of the United States
October 24, 2025	Springsteen: Deliver Me from Nowhere	co-production with Gotham Group
November 7, 2025	Predator: Badlands	co-production with Davis Entertainment
December 5, 2025	Diary of a Wimpy Kid: The Last Straw ‡	copyright holder only; produced by Walt Disney Pictures; distributed by Disney+
December 12, 2025	Ella McCay	co-production with Gracie Films
December 19, 2025	Avatar: Fire and Ash	co-production with Lightstorm Entertainment
January 30, 2026	Send Help	co-production with Raimi Productions
February 20, 2026	Psycho Killer	distribution outside Germany, Austria and Switzerland only; produced by Regency Enterprises, New Regency, Constantin Film and Vertigo Entertainment
March 27, 2026	Mike & Nick & Nick & Alice ‡	co-production with Mad Chance Productions; distributed by Hulu
May 1, 2026	The Devil Wears Prada 2	co-production with Wendy Finerman Productions and Sunswept Entertainment
August 28, 2026	The Dog Stars	co-production with Scott Free Productions
October 16, 2026	Whalefall	co-production with Imagine Entertainment and Jurassic Party Productions

== Upcoming ==
Release date	Title	Notes	Production status
February 5, 2027	Ice Age: Boiling Point	co-production with 20th Century Animation	Post-production
May 7, 2027	Beach Read	co-production with Original Film	Post-production
September 3, 2027	The New Simpsons Movie	co-production with 20th Century Animation and Gracie Films	In production
May 5, 2028	Untitled X-Men film	copyright holder only; produced by Marvel Studios	Pre-production
December 21, 2029	Avatar 4	co-production with Lightstorm Entertainment	Pre-production
December 19, 2031	Avatar 5	co-production with Lightstorm Entertainment	Pre-production

=== Undated films ===
Release date	Title	Notes	Status
2027	Painter ‡	co-production with Circle M+P, Infrared Pictures and Lightstorm Entertainment; distributed by Hulu	Post-production
2027	Romy and Michele 2 ‡	co-production with Laurence Mark Productions; distributed by Hulu	Post-production
TBA	Crush	co-production with 12:01 Films and Temple Hill Entertainment	Filming
TBA	King Conan		Pre-production
TBA	Major	co-production with Harpo Films and Scott Sanders Productions	Pre-production
TBA	Naughty	co-production with Hutch Parker Entertainment	Pre-production
TBA	Nue	co-production with Scott Free Productions, Robot Communications and Toho-Tombo	Pre-production
TBA	Street Justice	co-production with Gloria Sanchez Productions	Pre-production
TBA	Test Drive	co-production with Safehouse Pictures	Pre-production
TBA	Untitled fifth Planet of the Apes film	co-production with Chernin Entertainment	Pre-production
TBA	Untitled Martin Scorsese film	co-production with Sikelia Productions, Seven Bucks Productions, Appian Way Productions, Ledbury Productions and True Story Productions	Pre-production

=== In development ===
Title	Notes
The 17th Annual Coral Gables Christmas Caroling Extravaganza	co-production with Sugar23
99 Nights in the Forest	co-production with Ghost House Pictures
American Huckster	co-production with Scott Free Productions
The Barrier	
Bomb	co-production with Scott Free Productions
California Bear	co-production with Proximity Media
Capsule	co-production with Hutch Parker Entertainment
The Caves of Steel	
Children of the Jungle	co-production with Cara Films and Scott Free Productions
Choose Your Own Adventure	co-production with Radio Silence Productions
Commando 2	
The Devil in the White City	co-production with Appian Way Productions
Every House Is Haunted	co-production with Raimi Productions, Starlight Media and Vertigo Entertainment
Feed	co-production with Bantu Inc.
Hex	
Jennifer's Body 2	
Lazy Susans	co-production with Bond Group Entertainment
The Marriage Bargain	co-production with Premeditated Productions
Merry Ex-Mas	co-production with Higher Ground Productions
Night of the Ghoul	co-production with 21 Laps Entertainment
Persona	co-production with Pretty Dangerous Pictures
Ripped	co-production with Seven Bucks Productions and 12:01 Films
Sooner or Later	
The Tourist	
Untitled 24 film	co-production with Imagine Entertainment
Untitled 9 to 5 remake	co-production with Echo Films
Untitled Alien film	co-production with Scott Free Productions
Untitled Alita: Battle Angel sequel	co-production with Lightstorm Entertainment and Double R Productions
Untitled Buster Keaton biopic	
Untitled Dodgeball sequel	co-production with Red Hour Productions
Untitled Enemy Mine reboot	
Untitled fourth Night at the Museum film	co-production with 21 Laps Entertainment and 26th Street Pictures
Untitled Futurama film	co-production with 20th Century Animation, The Curiosity Company and Rough Draft Studios
Untitled Home Alone sequel	co-production with Point Grey Pictures
Untitled Master and Commander prequel	
Untitled Prey sequel	co-production with Lawrence Gordon Productions and Davis Entertainment
Untitled Scott Cooper film	co-production with Gotham Group
Untitled The Bob's Burgers Movie sequel	co-production with 20th Century Animation, Bento Box Entertainment and Wilo Productions
Untitled The Fantastic Four: First Steps sequel	studio credit and copyright holder only; produced by Marvel Studios
Untitled The Fly film	co-production with Chernin Entertainment
Untitled The Gunfighter remake	
Untitled The League of Extraordinary Gentlemen reboot ‡	co-production with 3 Arts Entertainment and Vertigo Comics; distributed by Hulu in the United States and Disney+ internationally via Hulu
Untitled The Maze Runner reboot	co-production with Gotham Group and Temple Hill Entertainment
Untitled third Rio film	co-production with 20th Century Animation
Untitled third Speed film	co-production with Fortis Films
Untitled Working Girl reboot	co-production with Red Wagon Entertainment
Witness for the Prosecution	
The Zone	co-production with Top Dawg Entertainment

== See also ==
- List of 20th Century Fox films (1935–1999)
- List of 20th Century Fox films (2000–2020)

In-depth lists by other types

- List of 20th Century Studios theatrical animated feature films

20th Century-branded labels

Operating:

- Searchlight Pictures (list)
- 20th Century Animation
- 20th Century Family
- Star Studio18

Defunct or divested:

- Blue Sky Studios (list)
- Fox 2000 Pictures
- Fox Atomic
- Fox Faith
- 20th Digital Studio
