= Too Hard to Handle =

- Directed by: Laura Lackmann
- Written by: Sarah Kuttner (novel)
- Starring: Claudia Eisinger; Katja Riemann
- Distributed by: X Verleih AG (through Warner Bros.)
- Release date: 12 May 2016
- Running time: 111 minutes
- Country: Germany
- Language: German

Too Hard to Handle (German: Mängelexemplar) is a 2016 German comedy film directed by Laura Lackmann.

== Cast ==
- Claudia Eisinger - Karo
- Katja Riemann - Luzy
- Barbara Schöne - Oma Bille
- Laura Tonke - Anna
- Maximilian Meyer-Bretschneider - Max
- Maren Kroymann - Annette
- Christoph Letkowski - Philipp
- Detlev Buck: Karo's Father
