= 13 Semester =

2009 film

- German poster
- Directed by: Frieder Wittich
- Written by: Frieder Wittich; Oliver Ziegenbalg
- Produced by: Jakob Claussen; Uli Putz
- Starring: Max Riemelt; Robert Gwisdek; Claudia Eisinger; Alexander Fehling; Dieter Mann
- Cinematography: Christian Rein
- Edited by: Marty Schenk
- Music by: Oliver Thiede
- Production companies: Claussen + Wöbke + Putz Filmproduktion; Hessischer Rundfunk; Arte; Instinctive Film
- Distributed by: 20th Century Fox
- Release date: 29 September 2009 (Zurich Film Festival)
- Running time: 101 minutes
- Country: Germany
- Language: German

13 Semester is a 2009 German comedy film. The subtitle (caption) „Der frühe Vogel kann mich mal” (literally “screw the early bird”) indicates that some students are not happy about the ‘early bird’. 13 semesters is longer than the standard period of study.

The film is about two friends, Moritz and Dirk, who move from a small village in the state of Brandenburg to Darmstadt to study mathematical economics at the Technische Universität (TU). The movie was first shown at the Zurich Film Festival and was also shown at the Hof International Film Festival on 29 September 2009. Its theatrical run in Germany started on 7 January 2010.

== Plot ==
Friends Moritz and Dirk are accepted at the Technische Universität Darmstadt and leave their small home village in Brandenburg to set out for the big city to study mathematical economics. Having arrived, their lives change in completely different ways. While Dirk becomes a successful student and masters tutorials and term papers with ease, Moritz is distracted from his studies by the student lifestyle and soon falls behind. Following the motto “Screw the early bird” Moritz prefers to party with his roommate Bernd and works various side jobs to make ends meet. At one of Bernd's parties, he meets Kerstin, the woman of his dreams, with whom he ends up in a relationship.

His lack of academic motivation gets him kicked out of his and Dirk's study group. This fuels him with new ambition and together with his Indian fellow student Aswin, who lives his life in discipline, Moritz picks himself up and passes his intermediate diploma. In gratitude he shows Aswin the more enjoyable side of university life and takes him along to drink beer. This leads to Aswin's life taking an unexpected turn. After his intermediate diploma Moritz spends a semester abroad in Australia. These scenes are expressed through multiple photo sequences commented by Moritz. The story he tells differs considerably according to whom he is talking to.

When he arrives back in Germany, he meets Kerstin in a laundromat and soon gets together with her. At first, the relationship is harmonious but soon the mood changes because Moritz is dissatisfied with himself and his life. This leads to Kerstin breaking up with him and Moritz moving out of the apartment shared with Bernd.

Moritz meets his old friend Dirk again, who works in Frankfurt now. In a conversation with him, it becomes clear that while Dirk has always gone directly for the goal, he is ultimately unsure whether this was the best way. Moritz takes heart and decides to finally finish his studies. He really puts his mind to it and passes his diploma. In the end, Moritz and Dirk are in Australia, where they lead a successful chain of restaurants for Maultaschen, a special German dish. However, the film only hints at what happens between Moritz and Kerstin, thus leaving the ending open.

== Cast ==
- Max Riemelt as Moritz (called “Momo”)
- Robert Gwisdek as his friend Dirk
- Dieter Mann as Professor Schäfer
- Amit Shah as Aswin
- Moritz Pliquet as Arne
- Daniel Zillmann as Käthe
- Cyril Sjöström as Flo
- Alex Holike as Jugendherbergsgast
- Benjamin Kramme as Uwe
- Alexander Fehling as Bernd (flatmate of “Momo”)
- Claudia Eisinger as Kerstin

== Production ==
=== Background ===
In writing the film, co-author Oliver Ziegenbalg drew on his own experiences. He studied mathematical economics and even achieved a diploma in his field of study. According to the director, there are more connections to real life that result from memories of his own life as a student. Frieder Wittich got to know the band Bonaparte at a small concert in Berlin and spontaneously invited them to take part in the shooting of 13 Semester. Thus, the song “Anti, Anti” became the film's theme song. The band cancelled a concert for this film and specially wrote a new song that is played over the end credits. At the beginning of the shooting, Amit Shah, who plays Aswin, barely spoke German. He figured it out himself while shooting.

=== Filming ===
The shooting for 13 Semester took place in the city of Darmstadt from March 31 to May 13, 2008. Darmstadt, the fourth-biggest city in the state of Hessen, was picked from a shortlist including university cities like Münster, Karlsruhe and Konstanz. Among other places in the near surroundings, several facilities of the Technical University of Darmstadt (Technische Universität Darmstadt), the canteen of the Darmstadt University of Applied Sciences (Hochschule Darmstadt), the University and State Library, the students dormitory Karlshof as well as the bar of the Kammerspiele of the local state theater, the inner-city lake “Großer Woog”, the Herrngarrten, Frankfurt and Offenbach am Main served as setting.

== Reception ==
Reviews of 13 Semester were mostly favourable: Kulthit.de praises the film as equivalent to the many US American student comedies. Filmszene.de highlights the character development, and kino.de talks about a successful Coming-of-Age comedy that very well depicts real students’ life, whereas Cinema thinks the film to be more “authentic” than funny and labels 13 Semester a tragic comedy. “’13 Semester‘ is an entertaining and loveable German student comedy. After some initial difficulties, director Wittich does not stick his foot in his mouth as often as could have been expected. It authentically, emphatically and humorously deals with really essential questions, such as “Why” and “Where to” in life and also gives differentiated answers. Here and there, it pleasantly makes fun of some cinematic stereotype which means that what is expected is not what happens.”

== Success ==
13 Semester had its debut performance on 29 September 2009 during the Zurich Film Festival. It had its first release in Germany at the Hof International Film Festival on October 28 the same year. The official theatrical release was on 7 January 2010. In Germany, the film attracted 56,700 viewers on the first screening weekend, placing 7th in the cinema charts. Until March 2010 a total of 174,600 viewers watched the film. It made about $1,333,750 (€1,068,950 ) at the box offices, placing 29th in the most successful German productions of 2010.
