= He, Du! =

- Directed by: Rolf Römer
- Release date: 1970
- Country: East Germany
- Language: German

He, Du! is a 1970 East German film directed by Rolf Römer.
