= Die Stunde der Offiziere =

2004 film

- Directed by: Hans-Erich Viet
- Starring: Harald Schrott
- Country of origin: Germany

Production
- Running time: 90 minutes

Original release
- Release: 2004

Die Stunde der Offiziere (English: The Hour of the Officers) is a German semi-documentary movie of 2003 telling in chronological order about the German resistance attempts to kill Adolf Hitler and seize power in Germany in the 20 July plot of 1944.

Produced by German TV ZDF, it parallels Stauffenberg of Jo Baier produced by German TV ARD in 2004 for the 60th anniversary of the coup. Historian Guido Knopp oversaw the production of Stunde der Offiziere.

== Plot ==
On 13 March 1943, Henning von Tresckow puts a bomb on Hitler's plane, but the bomb fails to explode. On 21 March 1943, Rudolf Christoph von Gersdorff intends a suicide bombing attack on Hitler in an exhibition, yet Hitler leaves prematurely. A similar attempt by Axel von dem Bussche fails as the event is canceled due to allied air raid on Berlin.

Last hope is on Claus Schenk Graf von Stauffenberg who, being in charge of Operation Walküre, has access to Hitler for reports. The bomb detonates on 20 July 1944 in Hitler Headquarter Wolfsschanze near Rastenburg. After returning to Berlin, he orchestrates the 20 July plot which fails after rumors, reports and finally confirmation about Hitler's survival become known. Four officers are executed immediately, many more after staged Volksgerichtshof trials.

== Background ==
The "docu drama" integrates re-enacted scenes, eye witness reports, and original footage to illustrate German resistance actions in detail.

It was first shown on 29 June 2004. It is frequently re-run on German documentary TV channel Phoenix.
