= Love in Space (film) =

2011 Hong Kong film by Tony Chan and Wing Shya

- Traditional Chinese: 全球熱戀
- Simplified Chinese: 全球热恋
- Hanyu Pinyin: Quán Qiú Rè Liàn
- Jyutping: Cyun4 Kau Jit6 Lyun2
- Directed by: Tony Chan; Wing Shya
- Written by: Tony Chan; Ho Man Man
- Produced by: Fruit Chan
- Starring: Aaron Kwok; Eason Chan; Rene Liu; Gwei Lun-mei; Angelababy; Jing Boran; Xu Fan
- Cinematography: Bartek Kaczmarek
- Production companies: Sundream Motion Pictures; Huayi Brothers; Fox International Productions
- Distributed by: 20th Century Fox
- Release date: 8 September 2011
- Running time: 100 minutes
- Countries: Hong Kong; China; United States
- Languages: Mandarin; Cantonese; English

Love in Space is a 2011 romantic comedy film produced Fruit Chan, directed by Tony Chan and Wing Shya and stars an ensemble cast including Aaron Kwok, Eason Chan, Rene Liu, Gwei Lun-mei, Angelababy, Jing Boran and a guest appearance by Xu Fan. The film was shot in Beijing and Sydney.

== Cast ==
- Aaron Kwok
- Eason Chan
- Rene Liu
- Gwei Lun-mei
- Angelababy
- Jing Boran
- Xu Fan
- Chapman To
- Grace Huang
- Liu Jinshan

== Plot ==
The film tells the stories of a mother and her three daughters about their own struggles in love. All the women had achieved progress in some way except in love. However, each of them found their own Mr.Right in the end. The woman named Mary (acted by XuFan) was a widow and came back to China from abroad. She was a generous woman and she learnt to cook with the help of a driver called Uncle Hua. After being together for a period of time, they fell in love.

The eldest daughter, Rose (acted by Rene Liu), was an astronaut, who was very independent and capable, but also a little bit competitive. In order to have the chance to go into space, she trained hard, only to find that she had to work with her ex: Michael (acted by Aaron Kwok). They stayed in the small capsule, working, eating and sleeping in the same place. Many things happened to them, making the fire of their love burn again.

The second daughter, called Lily (acted by Gwei Lun-mei), was in Sydney. Although she suffered from Mysophobia, she found herself attracted to Jonny (acted by Eason Chan), a man who collects garbage. they both loved each other very much and even sacrificed themselves to make one another feel happy. Eventually, they overcame all their difficulties and led a happy life.

The third daughter, whose name was Peony (acted by Angelababy) was a famous star but wasn't good at acting; so she went to a Cafe to become a waitress in order to gain experiences. There, she met a poor guy named Wenfeng (acted by Jing Boran). They also had a struggle because of the different backgrounds, but in the end they fell in love.

== See also ==
- Aaron Kwok filmography
