= Playing Doctor (film) =

- Theatrical release poster
- Doktorspiele
- Directed by: Marco Petry
- Starring: Merlin Rose; Lisa Vicari
- Production companies: Lieblingsfilm; Fox International Productions; die Film GmbH
- Distributed by: 20th Century Fox
- Release date: 28 August 2014
- Running time: 95 minutes
- Country: Germany
- Language: German

Playing Doctor (German: Doktorspiele) is a 2014 German comedy film directed by Marco Petry.

== Cast ==
- Merlin Rose as Andi
- Lisa Vicari as Lilli
- Max von der Groeben as Harry
- Jannis Niewöhner as Bobby
- Christiane Paul as Andi's Mother
- Oliver Korittke as Andi's Father Tom
- Ella-Maria Gollmer as Katja
- Olga von Luckwald as Bea Zimmermann
- Ivo Kortlang as Jaromir
- Gerd Knebel as Fußballtrainer
