= Fox International Productions =

Defunct international production division of 20th Century Fox Film Corporation

- Logo used until 2017
- Type: Division
- Industry: Film production
- Founded: May 12, 2008; 18 years ago
- Defunct: December 2017; 8 years ago
- Fate: Folded into 20th Century Fox International
- Successor: 20th Century Fox International
- Headquarters: Fox Studio Lot Building 88, 10201 West Pico Boulevard, Century City, Los Angeles, California, United States
- Area served: Worldwide
- Key people: Sanford Panitch (president)
- Owner: 21st Century Fox
- Parent: 20th Century Fox
- Website: 20th Century Fox Website

Fox International Productions was the division of 20th Century Fox in charge of local production in several international markets such as Asia, Europe, and Latin America.

== History ==
In 2008, 20th Century Fox started its international division, Fox International Productions, under president Sanford Panitch. The company had $900 million in box-office receipts by the time Panitch left the company for Sony Pictures on June 2, 2015. Co-president of worldwide theatrical marketing and distribution for 20th Century Fox Tomas Jegeus was named president of Fox International Productions effective September 1, 2015. The company struck a development and production deal in November 2015 with Zhejiang Huace, a Chinese entertainment group. In December 2017, 20th Century Fox film chairman-CEO Stacey Snider indicated that Fox International Productions would be dissolved in favor of each local and regional offices producing or acquiring projects.

== Management and distribution ==
From 2008 to 2015, Sanford Panitch ran the company as president, and from 2015 to the division's closure, it was run by Tomas Jegeus. Like other Fox units, Stacey Snider ran Fox International Productions. Meanwhile, the employees are from Asia, Latin America and Australia.

== Filmography ==
All Fox International Productions films have been distributed by 20th Century Fox in their native countries, unless marked.

=== Main releases ===
==== 2000s ====
Release date	Title	Notes
October 9, 2009	Agora	co-production with Mod Producciones, Himenoptero and Telecinco Cinema; international distribution by Focus Features International

==== 2010s ====
Release date	Title	Notes
February 24, 2010	Hot Summer Days	Hong Kong film
September 16, 2010	Hidalgo: la historia jamás contada	Mexican film
December 17, 2010	Angel of Evil	co-production with Fortissimo Films, Cosmo Productions S.r.l., Babe Films, Canal+ Cinéma and Mandragora Movies
December 22, 2010	The Yellow Sea	
March 3, 2011	Lyubov-Morkov 3	
March 17, 2011	The Butcher, the Chef and the Swordsman	
June 17, 2011	Come trovare nel modo giusto l'uomo sbagliato	
August 25, 2011	What a Man	co-production with Pantaleon Films
September 8, 2011	Love in Space	distributed by Huayi Brothers, Sundream Motion Pictures and 20th Century Fox
September 9, 2011	Miss Bala	
September 16, 2011	The Hidden Face	distributed by Dynamo Capital and 20th Century Fox in Spain and Buena Vista International through Cinecolor Films in Colombia
January 5, 2012	We Are Family	
February 3, 2012	Ghost Graduation	
June 5, 2013	Worms	Brazilian animated film
March 14, 2014	The Popcorn Chronicles	co-production with Alameda Films, Blu Films and Cinepantera
March 17, 2014	Copa de Elite	
June 5, 2014	Amapola	
June 27, 2014	Another Me	co-production with Rainy Day Films and Tornasol Films
August 28, 2014	Playing Doctor	German film; co-production with Lieblingsfilm and die Film GmbH
September 18, 2014	Mea Culpa	French film; U.S., Latin American, German and Austrian distribution only
October 2, 2014	Slow Video	Korean film
June 5, 2015	The Crow's Egg	Indian film; International distribution only; co-production with Fox Star Studios, Wunderbar Films and Grass Root Film Company
June 15, 2016	The Wailing	Korean film
September 7, 2017	Lino: An Adventure of Nine Lives	Brazilian animated film
March 9, 2018	Walk Like a Panther	
August 30, 2018	212 Warrior	Indonesian film
August 30, 2018	The Flip Side	co-production with Screen Australia, South Australian Film Corporation and Corner Table Productions; released under 20th Century Fox
