= List of American superhero films =

This is a list of superhero films produced by American film studios by year.

== DC and Marvel ==
- List of films based on DC Comics publications
- List of films based on Marvel Comics publications

== Independents ==
- List of television series and films based on Archie Comics publications
- List of television series and films based on Boom! Studios publications
- List of television series and films based on Dark Horse Comics publications
- List of television series and films based on Harvey Comics publications
- List of television series and films based on IDW Publishing publications
- List of television series and films based on Image Comics publications
- List of television series and films based on Oni Press publications

== Live-action ==
=== Live-action feature films ===
| Year | Film | Publisher | Director | Studio | Worldwide gross | Notes |
|---|---|---|---|---|---|---|
| 1937 | The Shadow Strikes | Street & Smith | Lynn Shores | Grand National Films Inc. | —N/a | Film featuring The Shadow character. |
| 1938 | International Crime | Street & Smith | Charles Lamont | Grand National Films Inc. | —N/a | Film featuring The Shadow character. |
| 1945 | Dick Tracy | Detroit Mirror | William Berke | RKO Pictures | —N/a | Film featuring the character Dick Tracy. |
| 1946 | The Shadow Returns' | Street & Smith | Phil Rosen, William Beaudine | Monogram Pictures | —N/a | Part of The Shadow franchise. |
| 1946 | Behind the Mask' | Street & Smith | Phil Karlson | Monogram Pictures | —N/a | Film featuring The Shadow character. |
| 1946 | Dick Tracy vs. Cueball | Detroit Mirror | Gordon Douglas, James Anderson | RKO Pictures | —N/a | Film featuring the character Dick Tracy |
| 1946 | The Missing Lady' | Street & Smith | Phil Karlson | Monogram Pictures | —N/a | Part of The Shadow franchise. |
| 1947 | Dick Tracy's Dilemma | Detroit Mirror | John Rawlins | RKO Pictures | —N/a | Film featuring the character Dick Tracy |
| 1947 | Dick Tracy Meets Gruesome | Detroit Mirror | John Rawlins | RKO Pictures | —N/a | Part of the Dick Tracy franchise. |
| 1956 | The Lone Ranger | WXYT (AM) | Stuart Heisler | Warner Bros. Pictures | Theatrical ($1,550,000) | Film based on The Lone Ranger television series. |
| 1958 | The Lone Ranger and the Lost City of Gold | WXYT (AM) | Lesley Selander | United Artists | —N/a | Sequel to The Lone Ranger. |
| 1958 | Invisible Avenger' | Street & Smith | James Wong Howe, Ben Parker, John Sledge | Republic Pictures | —N/a | Part of The Shadow franchise. |
| 1966 | Rat Pfink a Boo Boo | Original | Ray Dennis Steckler | Craddock Films | —N/a | |
| 1966 | The Wild World of Batwoman | Original | Jerry Warren | ADPProductions | —N/a | Film unrelated to the Batman franchise. |
| 1966 | Doctor Satan's Robot | Original | Various | Republic Pictures | —N/a | Part of the Mysterious Doctor Satan franchise. |
| 1967 | Fearless Frank | Original | Philip Kaufman | Trans American Films | —N/a | |
| 1970 | Hercules in New York | Original | Arthur Allan Seidelman | RAF Industries | Theatrical ($300,000) | |
| 1974 | Black Belt Jones | Original | Robert Clouse | Warner Bros. Pictures | —N/a | |
| 1975 | Doc Savage: The Man of Bronze' | Street & Smith | Michael Anderson | Warner Bros. Pictures | —N/a | Film based on the pulp comic Doc Savage. |
| 1975 | Dolemite | Original | D'Urville Martin | Dimension Pictures | Theatrical ($12,000,000) | |
| 1976 | The Human Tornado | Original | Cliff Roquemore | Dimension Pictures | —N/a | Sequel to Dolemite. |
| 1977 | Abar, the First Black Superman | Original | Frank Packard | Mirror Releasing | —N/a | A blaxploitation film |
| 1977 | Exo-Man | Original | Richard Living | NBC | —N/a | |
| 1978 | Kiss Meets the Phantom of the Park | Original | Gordon Hessler | Hanna-Barbera, Universal Pictures (NBC) | —N/a | Television film Based on the rock band Kiss, and not on pre-existing comic |
| 1980 | Hero at Large | Original | Martin Davidson | Metro-Goldwyn-Mayer | Theatrical ($15,934,737) | |
| 1980 | Flash Gordon | King Features Syndicate | Mike Hodges | Universal Pictures | Theatrical ($27,107,960) | Based on the comic strip by Alex Raymond |
| 1980 | Super Fuzz | Original | Sergio Corbucci | AVCO Embassy | —N/a | |
| 1981 | Raiders of the Lost Ark | Original | Steven Spielberg | Paramount Pictures | Theatrical ($389.9,000,000) | Film featuring the character Indiana Jones. Part of the Indiana Jones franchise. |
| 1981 | Condorman | Original | Charles Jarrott | Walt Disney Pictures | Theatrical ($4,500,000) | |
| 1981 | The Cannonball Run | Original | Hal Needham | 20th Century Fox | Theatrical ($160,000,000) | Actor Dom DeLuise plays superhero Captain Chaos. |
| 1981 | Zorro, The Gay Blade | Argosy | Peter Medak | 20th Century Fox | Theatrical ($5.1,000,000) | Film featuring the character Zorro. |
| 1981 | The Legend of the Lone Ranger | WXYT (AM) | William A. Fraker | Universal Pictures | Theatrical ($12,617,845) | Film based on the Lone Ranger radio show. |
| 1982 | The Beastmaster | Original | Don Coscarelli | Metro-Goldwyn-Mayer | Theatrical ($14.1,000,000) | |
| 1982 | Tron | Original | Steven Lisberger | Walt Disney Pictures | Theatrical ($33,001,374) | |
| 1982 | Conan the Barbarian | Weird Tales | John Milius | Universal Pictures | Theatrical ($79.1,000,000) | Film featuring the character Conan the Barbarian. |
| 1982 | Swamp Thing | Vertigo/DC | Wes Craven | Embassy Pictures | Theatrical ($2.5,000,000) | |
| 1982 | Modesty Blaise | Hall Syndicate | Reza Badigi ABC | —N/a | Film based on the comic strip by Peter O'Donnell. | |
| 1983 | Hercules | Original | Luigi Cozzi | The Cannon Group, Inc. | Theatrical ($11,000,000) | Film starring Lou Ferrigno. |
| 1984 | The Toxic Avenger | Original | Lloyd Kaufman | Troma Entertainment | Theatrical ($800,000) | |
| 1984 | Indiana Jones and the Temple of Doom | Original | Steven Spielberg | Paramount Pictures | Theatrical ($333.1,000,000) | Prequel to Raiders of the Lost Ark. Part of the Indiana Jones franchise. |
| 1984 | The Adventures of Buckaroo Banzai Across the 8th Dimension | Original | W. D. Richter | 20th Century Fox, Sherwood Productions | Theatrical ($6,254,148) | |
| 1984 | The Brother from Another Planet | Original | John Sayles | Cinecom | Theatrical ($4,000,000) | |
| 1984 | Cannonball Run II | Original | Hal Needham | Warner Bros. Pictures | Theatrical ($56.3,000,000) | Dom Deluise reprises his role as superhero Captain Chaos. |
| 1984 | Ghostbusters | Original | Ivan Reitman | Columbia Pictures | Theatrical ($295.2,00,000) | |
| 1984 | Conan the Destroyer | Weird Tales | Richard Fleischer | Universal Pictures | ($31,000,000) | Sequel to Conan the Barbarian. |
| 1984 | Sheena | Fiction House | John Guillermin | Columbia Pictures | Theatrical ($5,778,353) | Film featuring the character Sheena, Queen of the Jungle |
| 1984 | The Terminator | Original | James Cameron | Orion Pictures | Theatrical | |
| 1985 | Red Sonja | Oriental Stories | Richard Fleischer | Metro-Goldwyn-Mayer | Theatrical ($6.9,000,000) | Film featuring the character Red Sonja |
| 1985 | The Adventures of Hercules | Original | Luigi Cozzi | The Cannon Group, Inc. | —N/a | Sequel to Hercules |
| 1985 | The Last Dragon | Original | Michael Schultz | TriStar Pictures | Theatrical ($10,000,000) | Soundtrack executive produced by Berry Gordy. |
| 1985 | Remo Williams: The Adventure Begins | Warren Murphy, Richard Sapir | Guy Hamilton | Orion Pictures | Theatrical ($14.4,000,000) | Film based on The Destroyer novel series. |
| 1986 | The Wraith | Original | Mike Marvin | New Century Vista Film Company | Theatrical ($3,500,000) | |
| 1986 | Eliminators | Original | Peter Manoogian | Empire International Pictures | Theatrical ($4,601,256) | |
| 1986 | Captain EO | Original | Francis Ford Coppola | Walt Disney Imagineering, Lucasfilm Ltd. | Theatrical ($23.7,000,000) | Film based on an attraction at Disneyland. |
| 1986 | Kung Fu: The Movie | Original | Richard Lang | Warner Bros. Television Studios | —N/a | Continuation of the television series Kung Fu |
| 1987 | RoboCop | Original | Paul Verhoeven | Orion Pictures | Theatrical ($53,424,681) | |
| 1987 | Wild Thing | Original | Max Reid | Atlantic Entertainment Group | Theatrical ($84,000) | |
| 1987 | Masters of the Universe | Mattel | Gary Goddard | The Cannon Group, Inc. | Theatrical ($17,000,000) | Based on a toy franchise and television series of the same name |
| 1987 | The Spirit | Register and Tribune Syndicate | Michael Schultz ABC | —N/a | Television film The film served as a pilot for a planned TV series. | |
| 1987 | The Return of the Six Million Dollar Man and the Bionic Woman | Original | Ray Austin | —N/a | NBC | Continuation of the television series The Six Million Dollar Man and The Bionic Woman. |
| 1988 | Moonwalker | Original | Various | Warner Bros. Pictures | Theatrical ($67,000,000) | |
| 1989 | The Return of Swamp Thing | Vertigo/DC | Jim Wyrnorski | Millimeter Films | | |
| 1989 | Bionic Showdown: The Six Million Dollar Man and the Bionic Woman | Original | Alan J. Levi | NBC | —N/a | Continuation of the television series The Six Million Dollar Man and The Bionic Woman |
| 1989 | The Toxic Avenger Part II | Original | Lloyd Kaufman | Troma Entertainment | Theatrical ($792,966) | Sequel to 1984's The Toxic Avenger |
| 1989 | The Toxic Avenger Part III: The Last Temptation of Toxie | Original | Lloyd Kaufman | Troma Entertainment | Theatrical ($363,561) | Sequel to 1989's The Toxic Avenger Part II |
| 1989 | Ghostbusters II | Original | Ivan Reitman | Columbia Pictures | Theatrical ($215.4,000,000) | Sequel to Ghostbusters. Part of the Ghostbusters franchise. |
| 1989 | Indiana Jones and the Last Crusade | Original | Steven Spielberg | Paramount Pictures | Theatrical ($474.2,000,000) | Sequel to Raiders of the Lost Ark. Part of the Indiana Jones franchise. |
| 1989 | Robot Ninja | Original | J.R. Bookwalter | —N/a | Theatrical ($15,000) | Film featuring Batman's Burt Ward. |
| 1990 | Dick Tracy | Detroit Mirror | Warren Beatty | Touchstone Pictures | Theatrical ($162,000,000.7) | Film based on the comic Dick Tracy |
| 1990 | Teenage Mutant Ninja Turtles | Mirage Studios | Steve Barron | New Line Cinema | Theatrical ($201,965,915) | |
| 1990 | RoboCop 2 | Original | Irvin Kershner | Orion Pictures | Theatrical ($45,681,173) | Sequel to a 1987 film |
| 1990 | Darkman | Original | Sam Raimi | Universal Pictures | Theatrical ($48,878,502) | |
| 1990 | Sgt. Kabukiman N.Y.P.D. | Original | Michael Herz | Troma Entertainment | —N/a | |
| 1990 | Dark Avenger | Original | Guy Magar | CBS | —N/a | Television film; Theserved as a pilot for a planned TV series. |
| 1991 | Teenage Mutant Ninja Turtles II: The Secret of the Ooze | Mirage Studios | Michael Pressman | New Line Cinema | Theatrical ($78,656,813) | Sequel to a 1990 film |
| 1991 | Terminator 2: Judgment Day | Original | James Cameron | TriStar Pictures | Theatrical ($520.9,000,000) | Sequel to The Terminator. |
| 1991 | The Rocketeer | Pacific Comics | Joe Johnston | Walt Disney Pictures | Theatrical ($62,000,000) | |
| 1991 | Suburban Commando | Original | Burt Kennedy | New Line Cinema | Theatrical ($8,000,000) | Film starring Hulk Hogan. |
| 1991 | Knight Rider 2000 | Original | Alan J. Levi | NBC | —N/a | Film based on the television series Knight Rider |
| 1991 | Beastmaster 2: Through the Portal of Time | Original | Sylvio Tabet | New Line Cinema | Theatrical ($869,325) | Sequel to The Beastmaster |
| 1991 | The Guyver | Tokuma Shoten, Kadokawa Shoten | Screaming Mad George, Steve Wang | New Line Cinema | Theatrical ($3,000,000) | Film based on the manga Bio Booster Armor Guyver by Yoshiki Takaya. |
| 1992 | Doctor Mordrid | Original | Albert Band, Charles Band | Full Moon Entertainment | —N/a | Direct-to-video; Based on an old Doctor Strange script |
| 1992 | 3 Ninjas | Original | Jon Turteltaub | Touchstone Pictures | Theatrical ($29,000,000) | |
| 1992 | Buffy the Vampire Slayer | Original | Fran Rubel Kuzui | 20th Century Fox | Theatrical ($16.6,000,000) | Film that inspired the television series Buffy the Vampire Slayer. |
| 1992 | Army of Darkness | Original | Sam Raimi | Universal Pictures | Theatrical ($21.5,000,000) | Part of the Evil Dead franchise. |
| 1992 | Universal Soldier | Original | Roland Emmerich | TriStar Pictures | Theatrical ($95,000,000) | |
| 1993 | Teenage Mutant Ninja Turtles III | Mirage Studios | Stuart Gillard | New Line Cinema | Theatrical ($42,273,609)5 | Sequel to Teenage Mutant Ninja Turtles II: The Secret of the Ooze |
| 1993 | The Meteor Man | Original | Robert Townsend | Metro-Goldwyn-Mayer | Theatrical ($8,023,147) | |
| 1993 | Super Mario Bros. | Nintendo | Rocky Morton, Annabel Jankel | Hollywood Pictures | Theatrical ($38.9,000,000) | Film based on the Super Mario video game. |
| 1993 | RoboCop 3 | Original | Fred Dekker | Orion Pictures | Theatrical ($10,696,210) | Sequel to 1990's RoboCop 2 |
| 1993 | 3 Ninjas Knuckle Up | Original | Shin Sang-ok | TriStar Pictures | Theatrical ($407,618) | Part of the 3 Ninjas film series. |
| 1993 | Demolition Man | Original | Marco Brambilla | Warner Bros. Pictures | Theatrical ($159.1,000,000) | |
| 1993 | Last Action Hero | Original | John McTiernan | Columbia Pictures | Theatrical ($137.3,000,000) | |
| 1994 | The Crow | Caliber Comics | Alex Proyas | Miramax, Dimension Films | Theatrical ($144,693,129) | |
| 1994 | Double Dragon | Technōs Japan | James Yukich | Gramercy Pictures | Theatrical ($4.2,000,000) | Film based on the Double Dragon video game series. |
| 1994 | Street Fighter | Capcom | Steven E. de Souza | Universal Pictures | Theatrical ($99.4,000,000) | Film based on the Street Fighter video game franchise. |
| 1994 | Bionic Ever After? | Original | Steven Stafford | CBS | —N/a | Continuation of the television series The Six Million Dollar Man and The Bionic Woman. |
| 1994 | Shrunken Heads | Original | Richard Elfman | Paramount Home Entertainment | Theatrical ($800,000) | A Full Moon Features film. |
| 1994 | Guyver: Dark Hero | Tokuma Shoten, Kadokawa Shoten | Steve Wang | New Line Cinema | —N/a | Sequel to The Guyver. |
| 1994 | The Shadow' | Street & Smith | Russell Mulcahy | Universal Pictures | Theatrical ($48,063,435) | |
| 1994 | Blankman | Original | Mike Binder | Columbia Pictures | Theatrical ($7,941,977) | |
| 1994 | 3 Ninjas Kick Back | Original | Charles T. Kanganis | TriStar Pictures | Theatrical ($11,798,854) | Part of the 3 Ninjas film series. |
| 1994 | Dark Angel: The Ascent | Original | Linda Hassani | Full Moon Features | —N/a | |
| 1994 | Hercules and the Amazon Women | Original | Bill L. Norton | Universal Television | —N/a | Part of the Hercules: The Legendary Journeys franchise. |
| 1994 | Hercules and the Lost Kingdom | Original | Harley Cokeliss | Universal Television | —N/a | Part of the Hercules: The Legendary Journeys franchise. |
| 1994 | Hercules and the Circle of Fire | Original | Doug Lefler | Universal Television | —N/a | Part of the Hercules: The Legendary Journeys franchise. |
| 1994 | Hercules in the Underworld | Original | Bill L. Norton | Universal Television | —N/a | Part of the Hercules: The Legendary Journeys franchise. |
| 1994 | Hercules in the Maze of the Minotaur | Original | Josh Becker | Universal Television | —N/a | Part of the Hercules: The Legendary Journeys franchise. |
| 1994 | Knight Rider 2010 | Original | Sam Pillsbury | NBCUniversal Syndication Studios | —N/a | Television film based on the television series Knight Rider. |
| 1995 | Darkman II: The Return of Durant | Original | Bradford May | Universal Pictures Home Entertainment | Theatrical ($4,000,000) | Direct-to-video; Sequel to 1990's Darkman |
| 1995 | Mortal Kombat | Midway Games | Paul W. S. Anderson | New Line Cinema | Theatrical ($122.2,000,000) | Film based on the Mortal Kombat video game franchise. |
| 1995 | Judge Dredd | Rebellion Developments | Danny Cannon | Hollywood Pictures | Theatrical ($113,493,481) | |
| 1995 | Fist of the North Star | Shueisha | Tony Randel | First Look Studios | Theatrical ($6.6,000,000 | Film based on the manga Fist of the North Star |
| 1995 | Black Scorpion | Original | Jonathan Winfrey | Showtime | —N/a | Television film |
| 1995 | Baywatch the Movie: Forbidden Paradise | Original | Douglas Schwartz | Artisan Entertainment | —N/a | Part of the Baywatch franchise. |
| 1995 | Highlander II: The Quickening | Original | Russell Mulcahy | Westinghouse Broadcasting | Theatrical ($15.6,000,000) | Sequel to Highlander |
| 1995 | Mighty Morphin Power Rangers: The Movie | Original | Bryan Spicer | 20th Century Fox | Theatrical ($66,433,194) | Based on the Mighty Morphin Power Rangers TV series Characters created by Saban Entertainment |
| 1995 | The Demolitionist | Original | Robert Kurtzman | Two Moon Releasing | Theatrical ($1,000,000) | |
| 1996 | The Phantom | Strip | Simon Wincer | Paramount Pictures | Theatrical ($17,323,326) | |
| 1996 | Darkman III: Die Darkman Die | Original | Bradford May | Universal Pictures Home Entertainment | —N/a | Direct-to-video; Sequel to 1995's Darkman II: The Return of Durant |
| 1996 | Beastmaster III: The Eye of Braxus | Original | Gabrielle Beaumont | | —N/a | Part of The Beastmaster film series. |
| 1996 | Solo | Original | Norberto Barba | Sony Pictures | Theatrical ($5,107,669) | |
| 1996 | Theodore Rex | Original | Jonathan Betuel | New Line Cinema | Theatrical ($33.5,000,000) | |
| 1996 | The Crow: City of Angels | Caliber Comics | Tim Pope | Miramax, Dimension Films | Theatrical ($17,917,287) | Sequel to 1994 film |
| 1996 | Vampirella | Warren Publishing | Jim Wynorski | Concorde Pictures | —N/a | |
| 1997 | Mortal Kombat Annihilation | Midway Games | John R. Leonetti | New Line Cinema | Theatrical ($51.3,000,000) | Sequel to Mortal Kombat |
| 1997 | Turbo: A Power Rangers Movie | Original | Shuki Levy and David Winning | 20th Century Fox | Theatrical ($8,363,899) | Prequel to the Power Rangers Turbo TV series Characters created by Saban Entertainment |
| 1997 | Austin Powers: International Man of Mystery | Original | Jay Roach | New Line Cinema | Theatrical ($67.7,000,000) | Parody of James Bond and Jason King. |
| 1997 | Black Scorpion II: Aftershock | Original | Jonathan Winfrey | Showtime | —N/a | Television film Sequel to 1995's Black Scorpion |
| 1997 | Orgazmo | Original | Trey Parker | Universal Pictures | Theatrical ($602,302) | |
| 1997 | Warriors of Virtue | Original | Ronny Yu | Metro-Goldwyn-Mayer | Theatrical ($6,524,620) | |
| 1997 | Drive | Original | Steve Wang | —N/a | —N/a | |
| 1998 | Star Kid | Original | Manny Coto | Trimark Pictures | Theatrical ($7,029,025) | |
| 1998 | The Mask of Zorro | Original | Martin Campbell | TriStar Pictures | Theatrical ($250,288,523) | |
| 1998 | 3 Ninjas: High Noon at Mega Mountain | Original | Sean McNamara | TriStar Pictures | Theatrical ($375,805) | Part of the 3 Ninjas film series. |
| 1998 | The Chosen One: Legend of the Raven | Original | Lawrence Lanoff | Troma Entertainment | —N/a | |
| 1998 | Universal Soldier II: Brothers in Arms | Original | Jeff Woolnough | Showtime Networks | —N/a | Part of the Universal Soldier franchise. |
| 1998 | Universal Soldier III: Unfinished Business | Original | Jeff Woolnough | Showtime Networks | —N/a | Part of the Universal Soldier franchise. |
| 1999 | Inspector Gadget | Original | David Kellogg | Walt Disney Pictures | Theatrical ($134,403,112) | Based on the 1983 TV series of the same name |
| 1999 | The Matrix | Original | The Wachowskis | Warner Bros. Pictures | Theatrical ($466,000,000.6) | |
| 1999 | Universal Soldier: The Return | Original | Mic Rogers | TriStar Pictures | Theatrical ($10.7,000,000) | Part of the Universal Soldier franchise. |
| 1999 | Austin Powers: The Spy Who Shagged Me | Original | Jay Roach | New Line Cinema | Theatrical ($312,000,000) | Second installment of the Austin Powers film series. |
| 1999 | Alien Arsenal | Original | David DeCoteau | Full Moon Features | —N/a | Loose remake of the film Laserblast. |
| 2000 | Up, Up and Away | Original | Robert Townsend | Disney Channel | —N/a | Television film |
| 2000 | The Crow: Salvation | Caliber Comics | Bharat Nalluri | Miramax, Dimension Films | —N/a | Direct-to-video; Sequel to 1996's The Crow: City of Angels |
| 2000 | Knights of Justice | Big Bang Comics | Phillip Cable | —N/a | —N/a | Television film |
| 2000 | Dungeons & Dragons | TSR, Inc. | Courtney Solomon | New Line Cinema | Theatrical ($33.8,000,000) | Film based on the role-playing game Dungeons & Dragons. |
| 2000 | The Specials | Original | Craig Mazin | Fluid Entertainment, Regent Entertainment | Theatrical ($13,276) | |
| 2000 | Charlie's Angels | Original | McG | Columbia Pictures | Theatrical ($264.1,000,000) | Film based on the television series Charlie's Angels. |
| 2000 | Citizen Toxie: The Toxic Avenger IV | Original | Lloyd Kaufman | Troma Entertainment | —N/a | Sequel to 1989's The Toxic Avenger Part III: The Last Temptation of Toxie |
| 2000 | Unbreakable | Original | M. Night Shyamalan | Touchstone Pictures | Theatrical ($248,118,121) | |
| 2000 | Pitch Black | Original | David Twohy | Focus Features | Theatrical ($53.2,000,000) | |
| 2000 | Highlander: Endgame | Original | Doug Aarniokoski | Miramax | Theatrical ($15.8,000,000) | Part of the Highlander franchise. |
| 2001 | Lara Croft: Tomb Raider | Eidos | Simon West | Paramount Pictures | Theatrical ($247.7,000,000) | Film based on the Tomb Raider video game franchise. |
| 2001 | The One | Original | James Wong | Columbia Pictures, Revolution Studios | Theatrical ($72,689,126) | |
| 2001 | Cornman: American Vegetable Hero | Original | Barak Epstein | WorldWide International Picture Studios | —N/a | Homage/Parody of superhero movies. |
| 2001 | The Double-D Avenger | Original | William Winckler | Bio-Tide Films, Elite Entertainment, King Records, William Winckler Productions | —N/a | |
| 2001 | Earth vs. the Spider | Original | Scott Ziehl | Sony Pictures Home Entertainment | —N/a | Horror parody of Spider-Man. |
| 2001 | Jay and Silent Bob Strike Back | Original | Kevin Smith | Miramax, Dimension Films | Theatrical ($33.8,000,000) | Parody featuring the characters Jay and Silent Bob. |
| 2001 | Spy Kids | Original | Robert Rodriguez | Miramax, Dimension Films | Theatrical ($147.9,000,000) | |
| 2001 | Pootie Tang | Original | Louis C.K. | Paramount Pictures | Theatrical ($3.3,000,0000 | Film adapted from a sketch by The Chris Rock Show. |
| 2002 | Terror Toons | Original | Joe Castro | Brain Damage Films | Theatrical ($2,300) | |
| 2002 | Spy Kids 2: The Island of Lost Dreams | Original | Robert Rodriguez | Miramax, Dimension Films | Theatrical ($119.7,000,000) | Sequel to Spy Kids. |
| 2002 | The Tuxedo | Original | Kevin Donovan | DreamWorks Pictures | Theatrical ($104.4,000,000) | |
| 2002 | Undercover Brother | Original | Malcolm D. Lee | Universal Pictures | Theatrical ($41.6,000,000) | |
| 2002 | The Master of Disguise | Original | Perry Andelin Blake | Columbia Pictures | Theatrical ($43.4,000,000) | |
| 2002 | Austin Powers in Goldmember | Original | Jay Roach | New Line Cinema | Theatrical ($296.7,000,000) | Third installment of the Austin Powers film series. |
| 2003 | The League of Extraordinary Gentlemen | America's Best Comics | Stephen Norrington | 20th Century Fox | Theatrical ($179.3,000,000) | Film based on the comic book The League of Extraordinary Gentlemen |
| 2003 | The Medallion | Original | Gordon Chan | Sony Pictures (TriStar Pictures & Screen Gems) | Theatrical ($34.3,000,000) | |
| 2003 | Charlie's Angels: Full Throttle | Original | McG | Columbia Pictures | Theatrical ($259.2,000,000) | Sequel to Charlie's Angels |
| 2003 | Terminator 3: Rise of the Machines | Original | Jonathan Mostow | Warner Bros. Pictures | Theatrical ($433.4,000,000) | Part of the Terminator franchise. |
| 2003 | Agent Cody Banks | Original | Harald Zwart | Metro-Goldwyn-Mayer, 20th Century Fox | Theatrical ($58.8,000,000) | |
| 2003 | The Hebrew Hammer | Original | Jonathan Kesselman | Comedy Central, Strand Releasing | Theatrical ($82,157) | |
| 2003 | Lara Croft: Tomb Raider - The Cradle of Life | Eidos | Jan de Bont | Paramount Pictures | Theatrical ($160.1,000,000) | Sequel to Lara Croft: Tomb Raider. |
| 2003 | Inspector Gadget 2 | Original | Alex Zamm | Walt Disney Pictures | —N/a | Direct-to-video sequel to 1999's Inspector Gadget |
| 2003 | The Lone Ranger | WXYT (AM) | Jack Bender | Warner Bros. Television | —N/a | Part of the Lone Ranger franchise. |
| 2003 | Chimera | CrossGen | Jeff Sheetz | Independent | —N/a | |
| 2003 | SpiderBabe | Original | Johnny Crash | E.I. Independent | —N/a | Erotic parody of Spider-Man. |
| 2003 | Baywatch: Hawaiian Wedding | Original | Douglas Schwartz | 20th Television | —N/a | Part of the Baywatch franchise. |
| 2003 | The Black Ninja | Original | Clayton Prince | MTI Home Video, Singa Home Entertainment | —N/a | Independent film by actor Clayton Prince. |
| 2003 | Ultrachrist! | Original | Kerry Douglas Dye | LeisureSuit Media | —N/a | |
| 2003 | The Matrix Reloaded | Original | The Wachowskis | Warner Bros. Pictures | Theatrical ($741.,000,000.8) | Sequel to The Matrix. |
| 2003 | The Matrix Revolutions | Original | The Wachowskis | Warner Bros. Pictures | Theatrical ($427,000,000.3) | Part of The Matrix franchise. |
| 2003 | Spy Kids 3-D: Game Over | Original | Robert Rodriguez | Miramax, Dimension Films | Theatrical ($197,000,000) | Part of the Spy Kids film series. |
| 2003 | Kill Bill: Volume 1 | Original | Quentin Tarantino | Miramax | Theatrical ($180.9,000,000) | |
| 2003 | Underworld | Original | Len Wiseman | Screen Gems | Theatrical ($95.7,000,000) | |
| 2004 | Superbabies: Baby Geniuses 2 | Original | Bob Clark Triumph Films | Theatrical ($9,219,388) | Sequel to 1999's Baby Geniuses | |
| 2004 | Surge of Power: The Stuff of Heroes | Original | Mike Donahue | Ariztical Entertainment | —N/a | |
| 2004 | Comic Book: The Movie | Original | Mark Hamill | Miramax | —N/a | Mockumentary about a comic book fan. |
| 2004 | Van Helsing | Constable & Robinson | Stephen Sommers | Universal Pictures | Theatrical ($300.2,000,000) | Film based on different classic horror movie franchises. |
| 2004 | Resident Evil: Apocalypse | Capcom | Alexander Witt | Screen Gems | Theatrical ($129.3,000,000) | Part of the Resident Evil film series. |
| 2004 | My Name Is Modesty | Hall Syndicate | Scott Spiegel | Miramax | —N/a | Film based on the comic strip by Peter O'Donnell. |
| 2004 | Kill Bill: Volume 2 | Original | Quentin Tarantino | Miramax | Theatrical ($152.2,000,000) | Sequel to Kill Bill: Volume 1. |
| 2004 | Thunderbirds | Original | Jonathan Frakes | Universal Pictures | Theatrical ($28.3,000,000) | Film based on the television series Thunderbirds |
| 2004 | The Chronicles of Riddick | Original | David Twohy | Universal Pictures | Theatrical ($115.8,000,000) | Sequel to Pitch Black. |
| 2004 | Sky Captain and the World of Tomorrow | Original | Kerry Conran | Paramount Pictures | Theatrical ($58,000,000) | |
| 2004 | Agent Cody Banks 2: Destination London | Original | Kevin Allen | Metro-Goldwyn-Mayer, 20th Century Fox | Theatrical ($28.8,000,000) | Sequel to Agent Cody Banks. |
| 2004 | The Librarian: Quest for the Spear | Original | David Titcher | TNT | —N/a | First installment of The Librarian film series. |
| 2004 | D.E.B.S. | Original | Angela Robinson | Samuel Goldwyn Films | Theatrical ($97,446) | |
| 2005 | The Crow: Wicked Prayer | Caliber Comics | Lance Mungia | Miramax, Dimension Films | —N/a | Direct-to-video; Sequel to 2000's The Crow: Salvation |
| 2005 | Painkiller Jane | Event Comics | Sanford Bookstaver | Universal Television | —N/a | Film based on the comic book series Painkiller Jane. |
| 2005 | Dungeons & Dragons: Wrath of the Dragon God | TSR, Inc. | Gerry Lively | (Warner Bros. Home Entertainment | Theatrical ($1.7,000,000) | Sequel to the Dungeons & Dragons film. |
| 2005 | The Adventures of Sharkboy and Lavagirl in 3-D | Original | Robert Rodriguez | Miramax, Dimension Films, Columbia Pictures | Theatrical ($69,425,967) | |
| 2005 | The Legend of Zorro | Original | Martin Campbell | Columbia Pictures | Theatrical ($142,400,065) | Sequel to the 1998 film The Mask of Zorro |
| 2005 | Sky High | Original | Mike Mitchell | Walt Disney Pictures | Theatrical ($86,369,815) | |
| 2005 | Æon Flux | Original | Karyn Kusama | Paramount Pictures | Theatrical ($52,000,000.3) | Film based on the animated series Æon Flux. |
| 2005 | Die You Zombie Bastards! | Original | Caleb Emerson | Image Entertainment | Theatrical ($86,369,815) | |
| 2005 | Serenity | Original | Joss Whedon | Universal Pictures | Theatrical ($40.4,000,000) | Continuation of the television series Firefly |
| 2005 | Walker, Texas Ranger: Trial by Fire | Original | Aaron Norris | CBS Media Ventures | —N/a | Continuation of the original television series Walker, Texas Ranger. |
| 2006 | Gargantarama | AC Comics | —N/a | —N/a | —N/a | Direct-to-video; First superhero film with a giant female monster, since Attack of the 50 Foot Woman |
| 2006 | Lightspeed | POW! Entertainment | Don E. FauntLeRoy | —N/a | Nu Image | Television film Created by Stan Lee |
| 2006 | My Super Ex-Girlfriend | Original | Ivan Reitman | 20th Century Fox | Theatrical ($60,984,606) | |
| 2006 | Ultraviolet | Original | Kurt Wimmer | Screen Gems | Theatrical ($31,070,211) | |
| 2006 | Special | Original | Hal Haberman and Jeremy Passmore | Magnolia Pictures | —N/a | 2006 U.S. limited release |
| 2006 | Zoom | Original | Peter Hewitt | Columbia Pictures | Theatrical ($12,506,362) | |
| 2006 | Underworld: Evolution | Original | Len Wiseman | Screen Gems | Theatrical ($113.4,000,000) | Part of the Underworld film series. |
| 2006 | The Librarian: Return to King Solomon's Mines | Original | Jonathan Frakes | TNT | —N/a | Second installment of The Librarian film series. |
| 2007 | Bunny Whipped | Original | Rafael Riera | ThinkFilm | —N/a | Direct-to-video |
| 2007 | Underdog | Original | Frederik Du Chau | Walt Disney Pictures | Theatrical ($65,270,477) | Based on the 1960s TV series of the same name |
| 2007 | El Muerto | Los Cornex | Brian Cox | Peninsula Films, Three Lion Productions | —N/a | |
| 2007 | Ben 10: Race Against Time | Original | Alex Winter | Warner Bros. Television | —N/a | Television film Based on the Cartoon Network series |
| 2007 | The Junior Defenders | Original | Keith Spiegel | Warner Bros. Pictures | Theatrical ($172,000) | |
| 2007 | Highlander: The Source | Original | Brett Leonard | Lionsgate Films | Theatrical ($213,205) | Part of the Highlander franchise. |
| 2007 | Transformers | Hasbro | Michael Bay | Paramount Pictures | Theatrical ($709,000,000.7) | Film based on the Transformers franchise. |
| 2007 | Resident Evil: Extinction | Capcom | Russell Mulcahy | Screen Gems | Theatrical ($147.7,000,000) | Part of the Resident Evil film series. |
| 2008 | Jumper | Original | Doug Liman | 20th Century Fox | Theatrical ($222,231,186) | |
| 2008 | Superhero Movie | Original | Craig Mazin | Metro-Goldwyn-Mayer | Theatrical ($71,237,351) | |
| 2008 | Hancock | Original | Peter Berg | Columbia Pictures | Theatrical ($624,386,746) | |
| 2008 | Indiana Jones and the Kingdom of the Crystal Skull | Original | Steven Spielberg | Paramount Pictures | Theatrical ($790.7,000,000) | Part of the Indiana Jones franchise. |
| 2008 | You Don't Mess with the Zohan | Original | Dennis Dugan | Columbia Pictures | Theatrical ($204,313,400) | Co-produced with Relativity Media and Happy Madison Productions. |
| 2008 | Get Smart | Original | Peter Segal | Warner Bros. Pictures | Theatrical ($230.7,000,000) | Film based on the television series Get Smart. |
| 2008 | Get Smart's Bruce and Lloyd: Out of Control | Original | Gil Junger | Warner Premiere | —N/a | Spin-off of the film Get Smart |
| 2008 | The Spirit | Register and Tribune Syndicate | Frank Miller | Lionsgate Films | Theatrical ($39,031,337) | |
| 2008 | The Forbidden Kingdom | Wu Cheng'en | Rob Minkoff | Lionsgate Films, The Weinstein Company | Theatrical ($128,000,000) | Film based on the story Journey to the West. |
| 2008 | The Adventures of Food Boy | Original | Dane Cannon | Cold Spark Films | —N/a | |
| 2008 | Knight Rider | Original | Steve Shill | NBCUniversal Syndication Studios | Film based on the television series Knight Rider | |
| 2008 | The Librarian: Curse of the Judas Chalice | Original | Jonathan Frakes | TNT | Third and final installment of The Librarian film series. | |
| 2008 | Speed Racer | Shueisha | The Wachowskis | Warner Bros. Pictures | Theatrical ($93.9,000,000) | Film based on the Speed Racer franchise. |
| 2009 | Push | Original | Paul McGuigan | Summit Entertainment | Theatrical ($48,858,618) | |
| 2009 | Super Capers | Original | Ray Griggs | Lionsgate Films (Roadside Attractions) | Theatrical ($30,955) | |
| 2009 | Defendor | Original | Peter Stebbings | Sony Pictures Classics, Darius Films, Alliance Films | Theatrical ($44,462) | A Canadian-American film |
| 2009 | Paper Man | Original | Kieran Mulroney, Michele Mulroney | MPI Media Group | Theatrical ($13,514) | Actor Ryan Reynolds plays imaginary superhero Captain Excellent. |
| 2009 | Black Dynamite | Original | Scott Sanders | Apparition, f | Theatrical ($296,557) | Parody of blaxploitation films co-written and starring actor Michael Jai White. |
| 2009 | Ben 10: Alien Swarm | Original | Alex Winter | Warner Bros. Television | —N/a | Television film Based on the Cartoon Network series |
| 2009 | Wolvesbayne | Original | Griff Furst | Active Entertainment | —N/a | |
| 2009 | Street Fighter: The Legend of Chun Li | Capcom | Andrzej Bartkowiak | 20th Century Fox | Theatrical ($12.8,000,000) | Film based on the Street Fighter video game franchise. |
| 2009 | Dragonball Evolution | Shueisha | James Wong | 20th Century Fox | Theatrical ($58.2,000,000) | Film based on the Dragon Ball franchise. |
| 2009 | Transformers: Revenge of the Fallen | Hasbro | Michael Bay | Paramount Pictures | Theatrical ($836,000,000.3) | Sequel to Transformers |
| 2009 | G.I. Joe: The Rise of Cobra | Hasbro | Stephen Sommers | Paramount Pictures, Metro-Goldwyn-Mayer | Theatrical ($302.5,000,000) | Film based on the toyline G.I. Joe: A Real American Hero. |
| 2009 | Underworld: Rise of the Lycans | Original | Patrick Tatopoulos | Screen Gems | Theatrical ($91.4,000,000) | Prequel to Underworld. |
| 2009 | Universal Soldier: Regeneration | Original | John Hyams | Sony Pictures Home Entertainment | Theatrical ($844,000) | Part of the Universal Soldier franchise. |
| 2009 | G-Force | Original | Hoyt Yeatman | Walt Disney Pictures | Theatrical ($292.8,000,000) | |
| 2009 | Princess of Mars | A.C. McClurg | Mark Atkins | The Asylum | —N/a | Film based on the novel A Princess of Mars. |
| 2010 | Super | Original | James Gunn | IFC Films, StudioCanal | Theatrical ($593,933) | IFC's most successful VOD film so far |
| 2010 | Ghost of Garganta | AC Comics | —N/a | —N/a | —N/a | Direct-to-video, Sequel to a 2006 film |
| 2010 | Boy Wonder | Original | Michael Morissey | Lightning Entertainment | —N/a | |
| 2010 | The A-Team | Original | Joe Carnahan | 20th Century Fox | Theatrical ($177.2,000,000) | Film based on the television series The A-Team. |
| 2010 | The Last Airbender | Original | M. Night Shyamalan | Paramount Pictures | Theatrical ($319.7,000,000) | Film based on the animated series Avatar: The Last Airbender. |
| 2010 | Machete | Original | Robert Rodriguez, Ethan Maniquis | 20th Century Fox | Theatrical ($44.1,000,000) | Film featuring the character Machete. |
| 2010 | Tron: Legacy | Original | Joseph Kosinski | Walt Disney Pictures | Theatrical ($400,062,763) | Sequel to Tron |
| 2010 | The Sorcerer's Apprentice | Original | Jon Turteltaub | Walt Disney Pictures | Theatrical ($215.3,000,000) | Film loosely based on a segment from the movie Fantasia |
| 2010 | The Book of Eli | Original | Hughes Brothers | Warner Bros. Pictures, Summit Entertainment | Theatrical ($157.1,000,000) | |
| 2011 | The Green Hornet | Holyoke Publishing, NOW Comics | Michel Gondry | Columbia Pictures | Theatrical ($227,817,248) | |
| 2011 | Dylan Dog: Dead of Night | Sergio Bonelli Editore | Kevin Munroe | Freestyle Releasing | Theatrical ($5.8,000,000) | Film based on the comic Dylan Dog |
| 2011 | I Am Number Four | HarperCollins | D.J. Caruso | Touchstone Pictures | Theatrical ($149,878,437) | Based on the novel of the same name |
| 2011 | Transformers: Dark of the Moon | Hasbro | Michael Bay | Paramount Pictures | Theatrical ($1,000,000.124) | Part of the Transformers film series. |
| 2011 | Conan the Barbarian | Weird Tales | Marcus Nispel | Lionsgate Films | Theatrical ($63,000,000.3) | Film featuring the character Conan the Barbarian. |
| 2011 | Priest | Daewon C.I. | Scott Stewart | Screen Gems | Theatrical ($78,300,000) | Film based on the comic Priest. |
| 2011 | Pizza Man | Original | Joe Eckardt | Anchor Bay Entertainment | Theatrical ($3,000,000) | |
| 2011 | Immortals | Original | Tarsem Singh | Relativity Media, Universal Pictures | Theatrical ($226,000,000.5) | Film featuring characters from Greek mythology. |
| 2011 | All Superheroes Must Die | Original | Jason Trost | Image Entertainment | —N/a | Also known as Vs; Sequel All Superheroes Must Die 2: The Last Superhero was released in 2016. |
| 2011 | Spy Kids: All the Time in the World | Original | Robert Rodriguez | Dimension Films | Theatrical ($85.6,000,000) | Part of the Spy Kids film series. |
| 2011 | Cross | Original | Patrick Durham | Sony Pictures | —N/a | First of an independent film series. |
| 2012 | Chronicle | Original | Josh Trank | 20th Century Fox | Theatrical ($126,636,097) | |
| 2012 | Rise of the Black Bat | Standard Comics | Scott Patrick | TomCat Films | Direct-to-video | Co-production with Brett Kelly Entertainment and Dudez Productions. |
| 2012 | Dredd | Rebellion Developments | Pete Travis | Lionsgate Films | Theatrical ($41,467,606) | Reboot of the Judge Dredd film franchise |
| 2012 | Underworld: Awakening | Original | Mans Marlind, Bjorn Stein | Screen Gems | Theatrical ($160.1,000,000) | Part of Underworld |
| 2012 | Abraham Lincoln: Vampire Hunter | Grand Central Publishing | Timur Bekmambetov | 20th Century Fox | Theatrical ($116.4,000,000) | Film based on the novel Abraham Lincoln, Vampire Hunter. |
| 2012 | Resident Evil: Retribution | Capcom | Paul W. S. Anderson | Screen Gems | Theatrical ($240.2,000,000) | Part of the Resident Evil film series. |
| 2012 | John Carter | A.C. McClurg | Andrew Stanton | Walt Disney Pictures | Theatrical ($284.1,000,000) | Film based on A Princess of Mars. |
| 2012 | Somebody's Hero | Original | Darin Beckstead | | —N/a | |
| 2012 | Avenging Force: The Scarab | Standard Comics | Brett Kelly | Dudez Productions | —N/a | Direct-to-video |
| 2012 | Elf-Man | Original | Ethan Wiley | Anchor Bay Entertainment | —N/a | Direct-to-video; A Christmas superhero comedy film |
| 2012 | Alter Egos | Original | Jordan Galland | Phase 4 Films, SModcast | —N/a | Film is distributed by the podcast, SModcast, co-hosted by Kevin Smith. |
| 2012 | The Amazing Bulk | Original | Lewis Schoenbrun | Wild Eye Releasing | Theatrical ($14,000) | Mockbuster of the film The Incredible Hulk. |
| 2012 | Universal Soldier: Day of Reckoning | Original | John Hyams | Foresight Unilimite, Magnolia Pictures | Theatrical ($1.4,000,000) | Part of the Universal Soldier franchise. |
| 2013 | Pacific Rim | Original | Guillermo del Toro | Warner Bros. Pictures | Theatrical ($411,000,000) | |
| 2013 | Atlantic Rim | Original | Jared Cohn | The Asylum | —N/a | Direct-to-video; A mockbuster ripoff to Pacific Rim |
| 2013 | Super Buddies | Original | Robert Vince | Walt Disney Studios Home Entertainment | —N/a | Direct-to-video; Seventh installment in the Air Buddies franchise |
| 2013 | Sparks | Original | Chris Folino, Todd Burows | Sideshow Productions | —N/a | |
| 2013 | The Lone Ranger | WXYT (AM) | Gore Verbinski | Walt Disney Pictures | Theatrical ($260,000,000.5) | Film based on the Lone Ranger radio show. |
| 2013 | G.I. Joe: Retaliation | Hasbro | Stephen Sommers | Paramount Pictures, Metro-Goldwyn-Mayer | Theatrical ($302.5,000,000) | Sequel to G.I. Joe: Rise of Cobra. |
| 2013 | Riddick | Original | David Twohy | Universal Pictures | Theatrical ($98.3,000,000) | Part of The Chronicles of Riddick franchise. |
| 2013 | Machete Kills | Original | Robert Rodriguez | Open Road Films | Theatrical ($17.5,000,000) | Sequel to Machete. |
| 2014 | RoboCop | Original | José Padilha | Columbia Pictures, Metro-Goldwyn-Mayer | Theatrical ($242,688,965) | First reboot to the RoboCop franchise |
| 2014 | Godzilla | Toho | Gareth Edwards | Warner Bros. Pictures | Theatrical ($524,976,069) | Produced by Legendary Pictures; Reboot to the Godzilla franchise. |
| 2014 | Teenage Mutant Ninja Turtles | Mirage Studios | Jonathan Liebesman | Paramount Pictures | Theatrical ($485,004,754) | Reboot of the Teenage Mutant Ninja Turtles film franchise |
| 2014 | Birdman | Original | Alejandro González Iñárritu | Fox Searchlight Pictures | Theatrical ($103,000,000.2) | |
| 2014 | Hercules | Radical Studios | Brett Ratner | Paramount Pictures, Metro-Goldwyn-Mayer | Theatrical ($(244.8,000,000} | Film based on the graphic novel Hercules |
| 2014 | I, Frankenstein | Kevin Grevioux | Stuart Beattie | Lionsgate Films | Theatrical ($76.8,000,000) | Film based on a graphic novel. |
| 2014 | Transformers: Age of Extinction | Hasbro | Michael Bay | Paramount Pictures | Theatrical ($1,000,000.104) | Part of the Transformers film series. |
| 2014 | The Equalizer | Original | Antoine Fuqua | Columbia Pictures | Theatrical ($192.3,000,000) | Film based on the television series The Equalizer. |
| 2015 | American Hero | Original | Nick Love | Screen Media | Theatrical ($1,000,000) | |
| 2015 | Avengers Grimm | Original | Jeremy M. Inman | The Asylum | —N/a | Mockbuster of the film Avengers: Age of Ultron and the television series Once Upon a Time. |
| 2015 | Lazer Team | Original | Matt Hullum | Rooster Teeth | Theatrical ($1,600,000) | Co-produced by YouTube Red and Fullscreen Films |
| 2015 | Terminator Genisys | Original | Alan Taylor | Paramount Pictures | Theatrical ($440.6,000,000) | Part of the Terminator franchise. |
| 2016 | Teenage Mutant Ninja Turtles: Out of the Shadows | Mirage Studios | Dave Green | Paramount Pictures | Theatrical ($245,623,848) | Sequel to 2014's Teenage Mutant Ninja Turtles |
| 2016 | Hectic Knife | Original | Greg DeLiso | Troma Entertainment | —N/a | a Superhero parody |
| 2016 | The Accountant | Original | Gavin O'Connor | Warner Bros. Pictures | Theatrical ($155,560,045) | Co-produced by Electric City Entertainment, RatPac Entertainment and Zero Gravity Management. |
| 2016 | Max Steel | Mattel | Stewart Hendler | Open Road Films | Theatrical ($6,272,403) | Live-action reboot of the toyline franchise |
| 2016 | Resident Evil: The Final Chapter | Capcom | Paul W. S. Anderson | Screen Gems | Theatrical ($312.2,000,000) | Part of the Resident Evil film series. |
| 2016 | All Superheroes Must Die 2: The Last Superhero | Original | Jason Trost | —N/a | —N/a | Sequel to 2011's All Superheroes Must Die, released on YouTube |
| 2016 | Surge of Power: Revenge of the Sequel | Original | —N/a | —N/a | —N/a | Sequel to Surge of Power: The Stuff of Heroes. |
| 2016 | Underworld: Blood Wars | Original | Anna Foerster | Screen Gems | Theatrical ($81.1,000,000) | Part of the Underworld film series. |
| 2016 | Ghostbusters: Answer the Call | Original | Paul Feig | Columbia Pictures | Theatrical ($229.1,000,000) | Reboot of Ghostbusters. Part of the Ghostbusters franchise. |
| 2016 | Yoga Hosers | Original | Kevin Smith | Invincible Pictures | Theatrical ($38,784) | Part of the True North trilogy. |
| 2016 | Midnight Special | Original | Jeff Nichols | Warner Bros. Pictures | Theatrical ($7.68,000,000) | |
| 2017 | Split | Original | M. Night Shyamalan | Universal Pictures | Theatrical ($276,921,998) | Standalone sequel to 2000's Unbreakable; Co-produced with Blumhouse Productions |
| 2017 | iBoy | Original | Adam Randall | Netflix, XYZ Films | —N/a | |
| 2017 | Kong: Skull Island | Original | Jordan Vogt-Roberts | Warner Bros. Pictures | Theatrical ($568,652,812) | Produced by Legendary Pictures; Reboot to the King Kong franchise. |
| 2017 | Power Rangers | Hasbro | Dean Israelite | Lionsgate Films | Theatrical ($142,099,154) | Reboot of the Power Rangers film franchise |
| 2017 | Transformers: The Last Knight | Hasbro | Michael Bay | Paramount Pictures | Theatrical ($605,000,000.4) | Part of the Transformers film series. |
| 2017 | Ghost in the Shell | Kodansha | Rupert Sanders | Paramount Pictures | Theatrical ($169.8,000,000) | Film based on the Ghost in the Shell franchise. |
| 2017 | Sleight | Original | J. D. Dillard | WWE Studios, BH Tilt | Theatrical ($3,989,705) | Co-produced with Diablo Entertainment |
| 2017 | Baywatch | Original | Seth Gordon | Paramount Pictures | Theatrical ($177.9,000,000) | Film based on the television series Baywatch. |
| 2017 | The VelociPastor | Original | Brendan Steere | Wild Eye Releasing | —N/a | |
| 2017 | Lazer Team 2 | Original | Matt Hullum and Daniel Fabelo | Rooster Teeth | Theatrical ($19,996) | Co-produced by YouTube Red and Fullscreen Films |
| 2017 | Sign Gene | Original | Emilio Insolera | Pluin Productions | Theatrical ($25,000) | |
| 2018 | Tomb Raider | Eidos | Roar Uthaug | Warner Bros. Pictures, Metro-Goldwyn-Mayer | Theatrical ($274.7,000,000) | Film based on the Tomb Raider video game franchise. |
| 2018 | Pacific Rim Uprising | Original | Steven S. DeKnight | Universal Pictures | Theatrical ($290.9,000,000) | Sequel to Pacific Rim |
| 2018 | Ninjak vs. the Valiant Universe | Valiant Comics | Aaron Schoenke | ComicBook.com | —N/a | Based on the Valiant characters. Originally a series for Comicbook.com and film for YouTube. |
| 2018 | Avengers Grimm: Time Wars | Original | Maximilian Elfeldt | The Asylum | —N/a | Sequel to Avengers Grimm. Mockbuster of the film Avengers: Infinity War and the television series Once Upon a Time. |
| 2018 | Higher Power | Original | Matthew Charles Santoro | Magnet Releasing | —N/a | Co-produced with Di Bonaventura Pictures and Defy Media |
| 2018 | The Darkest Minds | Original | Jennifer Yuh Nelson | 20th Century Fox | Theatrical ($41,142,379) | Based on a novel of the same name Co-produced with 21 Laps Entertainment |
| 2018 | The Equalizer 2 | Original | Antoine Fuqua | Columbia Pictures | Theatrical ($190.4,000,000) | Sequel to The Equalizer. |
| 2018 | Hornet | Original | James Kondelik, Jon Kondelik | The Asylum | —N/a | Direct-to-video; A mockbuster ripoff to Bumblebee. |
| 2018 | Bumblebee | Hasbro | Travis Knight | Paramount Pictures | Theatrical ($468,000,000) | Spin-off from the Transformers film series. |
| 2018 | Kin | Original | Jonathan and Josh Baker | Summit Entertainment | Theatrical ($10.3,000,000) | |
| 2019 | Code 8 | Jeff Chan | —N/a | —N/a | —N/a | Full length version of a 2016 short film |
| 2019 | Glass | Original | M. Night Shyamalan | Buena Vista International, Universal Pictures | Theatrical ($246,999,039) | Sequel to 2000's Unbreakable and 2017's Split; Co-produced with Blumhouse Productions |
| 2019 | Alita: Battle Angel | Shueisha | Robert Rodriguez | 20th Century Fox | Theatrical ($405,000,000) | Film based on the manga Battle Angel Alita. |
| 2019 | Kim Possible | Original | Adam Stein, Zach Lipovsky | Disney Channel | —N/a | Live-action adaptation of the animated series Kim Possible. |
| 2019 | Nancy Drew and the Hidden Staircase | Grosset & Dunlap | Katt Shea | Warner Bros. Pictures | Theatrical ($623,088) | Reboot of the Nancy Drew film series. featuring the character Nancy Drew. |
| 2019 | Fast Color | Original | Julia Hart | Codeblack Films | Theatrical ($76,916) | Co-produced with LD Entertainment and Original Headquarters |
| 2019 | El Chicano | Original | Ben Hernandez Bray | Briarcliff Entertainment | Theatrical ($1,404,646) | The film has been called the "first Latino superhero movie" Co-produced with WarParty Films |
| 2019 | Brightburn | Original | David Yarovesky | Screen Gems | Theatrical ($32,893,421) | Co-produced with Stage 6 Films, Troll Court Entertainment and The H Collective; A superhero horror film |
| 2019 | Godzilla: King of the Monsters | Toho | Michael Dougherty | Warner Bros. Pictures | Theatrical ($387,300,138) | Produced by Legendary Pictures; Sequel to Godzilla. |
| 2019 | Freaks | Original | Adam Stein, Zach Lipovsky | Well Go USA Entertainment | Theatrical ($335,050) | Co-produced with Amazing Incorporated and Wise Daughter Films |
| 2019 | Jay and Silent Bob Reboot | Original | Kevin Smith | Saban Films | Theatrical ($4,691,248) | Parody featuring the characters Jay and Silent Bob; Sequel to Jay and Silent Bob Strike Back. |
| 2019 | Terminator: Dark Fate | Original | Tim Miller | Paramount Pictures, 20th Century Fox | Theatrical ($261.1,000,000) | Part of the Terminator franchise. |
| 2019 | Undercover Brother 2 | Original | Leslie Small | Universal Pictures Home Entertainment | —N/a | Sequel to Undercover Brother. |
| 2019 | Charlie's Angels | Original | Elizabeth Banks | Columbia Pictures | Theatrical ($73.3,000,000) | Part of the Charlie's Angels franchise. |
| 2020 | Sonic the Hedgehog | Sega Sammy Group | Jeff Fowler | Paramount Pictures | Theatrical ($320,954,026) | Hybrid film with both live-action and animation Based on a franchise of the same name Co-produced with Sega and Original Film |
| 2020 | Bloodshot | Valiant Comics | David S.F. Wilson | Columbia Pictures | Theatrical ($33,502,835) | Based on a character of the same name Co-produced with Original Film |
| 2020 | Project Power | Original | Ariel Schulman and Henry Joost | Netflix | —N/a | Co-produced with Screen Arcade and Supermarché |
| 2020 | Secret Society of Second-Born Royals | Original | Anna Mastro | Disney Channel | —N/a | |
| 2020 | Archenemy | Original | Adam Egypt Mortimer | RLJE Films | Theatrical ($136,240) | Co-produced with Voltage Pictures and SpectreVision |
| 2020 | Fatman | Original | Eshom Nelms, Ian Nelms | Saban Films | Theatrical (($1.7,000,000) | |
| 2020 | The Unhealer | Original | Martin Guigui | Shout Factory | —N/a | |
| 2020 | Monster Hunter | Capcom | Paul W. S. Anderson | Screen Gems | Theatrical ($42,145,959) | Based on a video game of the same name Co-produced with Constantin Film, Tencent Pictures, Toho and AB2 Digital Pictures |
| 2020 | We Can Be Heroes | Original | Robert Rodriguez | Netflix | —N/a | Co-produced with Double R Productions |
| 2021 | Flora & Ulysses | Candlewick Press | Lena Khan | Disney+ | —N/a | Based on a children's novel of the same name |
| 2021 | Lazarus | Original | R.L. Scott | Samuel Goldwyn Films | —N/a | Co-produced with Phoenix Rising Films, Overdog Entertainment and Wonder Studios |
| 2021 | Godzilla vs. Kong | Toho | Adam Wingard | Warner Bros. Pictures | Theatrical ($470,116,094) | Produced by Legendary Pictures crossover to Godzilla & King Kong. |
| 2021 | Mortal Kombat | Warner Bros. Interactive Entertainment | Simon McQuoid | New Line Cinema | Theatrical ($83.7,000,000) | Film based on the Mortal Kombat video game franchise. |
| 2021 | Thunder Force | Original | Ben Falcone | Netflix | —N/a | Co-produced with On the Day Productions |
| 2021 | Snake Eyes | Hasbro | Robert Schwentke | Paramount Pictures, Metro-Goldwyn-Mayer | Theatrical ($36,871,324) | Prequel to G.I. Joe; Co-produced with Skydance Media, Entertainment One and Di Bonaventura Pictures |
| 2021 | The Green Knight | Frederic Madden | David Lowery | A24 | Theatrical ($20,000,000) | Film based on the poem Sir Gawain and the Green Knight. |
| 2021 | Free Guy | Original | Shawn Levy | 20th Century Fox | Theatrical ($331,500,000) | |
| 2021 | Ghostbusters: Afterlife | Original | Jason Reitman | Columbia Pictures | Theatrical ($204.4,000,000) | Continuation of the original Ghostbusters films. Sequel to Ghostbusters II. Part of the Ghostbusters franchise. |
| 2021 | The Matrix Resurrections | Original | Lana Wachowski | Warner Bros. Pictures | Theatrical ($156,000,000.6) | Part of The Matrix franchise. |
| 2022 | Fistful of Vengeance | Original | Roel Reine | Netflix | —N/a | Follow-up to the television series Wu Assassins. |
| 2022 | The Hyperions | Original | Jon McDonald | The Daily Wire, Saban Films | —N/a | |
| 2022 | Everything Everywhere All at Once | Original | Daniels | A24 | Theatrical ($100.9,000,000) | |
| 2022 | Dracula: The Original Living Vampire | Original | Maximilian Elfeldt | The Asylum | —N/a | Direct-to-video; A mockbuster ripoff to Morbius. |
| 2022 | Sonic the Hedgehog 2 | Sega Sammy Group | Jeff Fowler | Paramount Pictures | Theatrical ($405,421,518) | Hybrid film with both live-action and animation Sequel to Sonic the Hedgehog. Co-produced with Sega & Original Film. |
| 2022 | Corrective Measures | Arcana Studio | Sean O'Reilly | Tubi | —N/a | |
| 2022 | Firestarter | Viking Press | Keith Thomas | Universal Pictures | Theatrical ($14.9,000,000) | Adaptation of the novel Firestarter by Stephen King. |
| 2022 | Secret Headquarters | Original | Henry Joost and Ariel Schulman | Paramount+ | —N/a | Produced by Jerry Bruckheimer Films |
| 2022 | Samaritan | Mythos Comics | Julius Avery | Amazon MGM Studios | —N/a | Produced by Balboa Productions |
| 2022 | Violent Night | Original | Tommy Wirkola | Universal Pictures | Theatrical ($25.7,000,000) | |
| 2023 | Teen Wolf: The Movie | Original | Russell Mulcahy | Paramount+ | —N/a | Based on the film and TV series Teen Wolf. |
| 2023 | Dungeons & Dragons: Honor Among Thieves | Hasbro | Jonathan Goldstein and John Francis Daley | Paramount Pictures | Theatrical ($350,562) | Based on the Tabletop role-playing game Dungeons & Dragons. |
| 2023 | Renfield | Constable & Robinson | Chris McKay | Universal Pictures | Theatrical ($3,140,000) | Film based on the Dracula film series. |
| 2023 | Sisu | Original | Jalmari Helander | Lionsgate Films | Theatrical ($14,236,005) | a Finnish - American co-production |
| 2023 | Mighty Morphin Power Rangers: Once & Always | Hasbro | Charlie Haskell | Netflix | —N/a | Continuation of the original Mighty Morphin Power Rangers series. |
| 2023 | Knights of the Zodiac | Shueisha | Tomasz Bagiński | Stage 6 Films) | Theatrical ($4,472,573) | Based on a manga Saint Seiya; A Japanese-American co-production. |
| 2023 | Transformers: Rise of the Beasts | Hasbro | Steven Caple Jr. | Paramount Pictures | Theatrical ($346,188,071) | Sequel to Bumblebee; Spin-off from the Transformers film series. |
| 2023 | Indiana Jones and the Dial of Destiny | Original | James Mangold | Lucasfilm | Theatrical ($383,963,057) | Fifth and final installment of the Indiana Jones film series. |
| 2023 | Gray Matter | Original | Meko Winbush | Max | —N/a | |
| 2023 | The Equalizer 3 | Original | Antoine Fuqua | Columbia Pictures | Theatrical ($13,100,000) | Sequel to The Equalizer 2. |
| 2023 | Spy Kids: Armageddon | Original | Robert Rodriguez | Netflix | —N/a | Reboot to the Spy Kids film series. |
| 2024 | The Thundermans Return | Original | Trevor Kirschner | Paramount+ | —N/a | Continuation of the television series The Thundermans. |
| 2024 | Ghostbusters: Frozen Empire | Original | Gil Kenan | Columbia Pictures | Theatrical ($114,426,978) | Sequel to Ghostbusters: Afterlife. |
| 2024 | Godzilla x Kong: The New Empire | Toho | Adam Wingard | Warner Bros. Pictures | Theatrical ($571,750,016) | Produced by Legendary Pictures; Sequel to Godzilla vs. Kong. |
| 2024 | The People's Joker | Original | Vera Drew | Altered Innocence | —N/a | A parody film of Joker |
| 2024 | Borderlands | Gearbox Software | Eli Roth | Summit Entertainment | Theatrical ($32,687,932) | Based on a video game of the same name |
| 2024 | The Crow | Caliber Comics | Rupert Sanders | Lionsgate Films | Theatrical ($21,105,349) | Reboot of the same name Co-produced with Media Capital Technologies, FilmNation Entertainment, Hassell Free Productions, Electric Shadow Co, Davis Films, Pressman Film, 30West and Ashland Hill Media Finance. |
| 2024 | Sonic the Hedgehog 3 | Sega Sammy Group | Jeff Fowler | Paramount Pictures | Theatrical ($491,603,986) | Hybrid film with both live-action and animation Sequel to Sonic the Hedgehog 2 Co-produced with Sega & Original Film |
| 2025 | Henry Danger: The Movie | Original | Joe Menendez | Paramount+ | —N/a | Continuation of the television series Henry Danger. |
| 2025 | Novocaine | Original | Dan Berk and Robert Olsen | Paramount Pictures | Theatrical ($11,349,008) | |
| 2025 | The Accountant 2 | Original | Gavin O'Connor | Metro-Goldwyn-Mayer | Theatrical ($103,223,366) | Sequel to The Accountant. |
| 2025 | Rise of the Super Tromettes | Original | Mercedes | Troma Entertainment | —N/a | |
| 2025 | M3GAN 2.0 | Original | Gerard Johnstone | Universal Pictures | Theatrical ($21,561,035) | Sequel to M3GAN. |
| 2025 | Red Sonja | Dynamite Entertainment | M. J. Bassett | Samuel Goldwyn Films | Theatrical ($264,526) | Produced by Millennium Media; Reboot of the same name. |
| 2025 | The Toxic Avenger | Original | Macon Blair | Cineverse, Iconic Events Releasing | Theatrical ($2,695,033) | Produced by Legendary Pictures; Part of The Toxic Avenger franchise. |
| 2025 | Tron: Ares | Original | Joachim Rønning | Walt Disney Pictures | Theatrical ($60,500,000) | Sequel to Tron: Legacy |
| 2025 | Frankenstein | Lackington, Hughes, Harding, Mavor & Jones | Guillermo del Toro | Netflix | —N/a | |
| 2025 | Sisu: Road to Revenge | Original | Jalmari Helander | Stage 6 Films & Screen Gems) | Theatrical ($9,811,703) | Sequel to Sisu a Finnish - American co-production |
| 2025 | Altered | Original | Timo Vuorensola | Well Go USA Entertainment | Theatrical ($346,774) | |
| 2025 | Kill Bill: The Whole Bloody Affair | Original | Quentin Tarantino | Lionsgate Films | Theatrical ($1,470,000) | Incorporation of both Kill Bill: Volume 1 and Kill Bill: Volume 2. |
| 2026 | Lazarus: The Awakening | Original | Art Camacho | Samuel Goldwyn Films | —N/a | Sequel to Lazarus. |
| 2026 | Mortal Kombat II | Warner Bros. Interactive Entertainment | Simon McQuoid | New Line Cinema | Theatrical ($60,001,177) | Sequel to Mortal Kombat. |
| 2026 | The Mandalorian and Grogu | Original | Jon Favreau | Lucasfilm | Theatrical ($33,000,007) | A Sequel and Spin-off to The Mandalorian. |
| 2026 | Masters of the Universe | Mattel | Travis Knight | Amazon MGM Studios | Theatrical ($11,754,000) | Based on a franchise of the same name Reboot of the same name |
| 2026 | The Odyssey | Original | Christopher Nolan | Universal Pictures | Theatrical ($368,060,231) | Based on Homer's Odyssey. |
| 2026 | Legend of the White Dragon | Original | Aaron Schoenke | Well Go USA Entertainment | Theatrical ($641,666) | |
| 2026 | Clash of the Thundermans | Original | Trevor Kirschner | Paramount+ | —N/a | Continuation of the television series The Thundermans. |
| 2026 | Street Fighter | Capcom | Kitao Sakurai | Paramount Pictures | Theatrical ($52,766,830) | Reboot of the same name. |
| 2026 | Ghost Soldier | Original | William Eubank | Columbia Pictures | —N/a | |

=== Upcoming ===
| Year | Film | Publisher | Director | Studio | Notes |
|---|---|---|---|---|---|
| 2026 | Violent Night 2 | Original | Tommy Wirkola | Universal Pictures | Sequel to Violent Night. |
| 2027 | The Beekeeper 2 | Original | Timo Tjahjanto | Amazon MGM Studios | Sequel to The Beekeeper. |
| 2027 | Sonic the Hedgehog 4 | Sega Sammy Group | Jeff Fowler | Paramount Pictures | Hybrid film with both live-action and animation Sequel to Sonic the Hedgehog 3 Co-produced with Sega & Original Film |
| 2027 | Godzilla x Kong: Supernova | Toho | Grant Sputore | Warner Bros. Pictures | Produced by Legendary Pictures; Sequel to Godzilla x Kong: The New Empire. |
| 2027 | Voltron | World Events Productions | Rawson Marshall Thurber | Amazon MGM Studios | Based on Voltron. |
| 2027 | Gundam | Bandai Namco Holdings | Jim Mickle | Netflix | Based on a character of the same name Produced by Legendary Pictures |
| 2028 | Untitled G.I. Joe reboot film | Hasbro | Danny McBride | Paramount Pictures, Metro-Goldwyn-Mayer | Reboot to the G.I. Joe film series. |
| 2028 | Untitled Teenage Mutant Ninja Turtles film | Mirage Studios | TBA | Paramount Pictures | Reboot to Teenage Mutant Ninja Turtles. Co-produced with Nickelodeon Movies & Original Film |
| 2028 | Untitled Sonic spinoff film | Sega Sammy Group | TBA | Paramount Pictures | Hybrid film with both live-action and animation Co-produced with Sega & Original Film |
| TBA | Riddick: Furya | Original | David Twohy | Universal Pictures | Part of The Chronicles of Riddick franchise. |
| TBA | Highlander | Original | Chad Stahelski | United Artists | Reboot of the same name |
| TBA | Untitled Transformers/G.I. Joe crossover | Hasbro | TBA | Paramount Pictures | A Crossover between Transformers & G.I. Joe. |
| TBA | The Equalizer 4 | Original | TBA | Columbia Pictures | Sequel to The Equalizer 3. |
| TBA | The Equalizer 5 | Original | TBA | Columbia Pictures | Sequel to The Equalizer 4. |
| TBA | Naruto | Shueisha | Destin Daniel Cretton | Lionsgate Films | Based on a manga and anime of the same name. |
| TBA | My Hero Academia | Shueisha | Shinsuke Sato | Netflix | Based on a manga of the same name Co-produced with Legendary Entertainment and Toho Pictures |
| TBA | Incorruptible | Boom! Studios | Jeymes Samuel | Netflix | |
| TBA | Irredeemable | Boom! Studios | Jeymes Samuel | Netflix | |
| TBA | Untitled The Crow Sequel | Caliber Comics | TBA | TBA | Sequel to The Crow |
| TBA | Untitled Bloodshot Sequel | Valiant Comics | TBA | TBA | Sequel to Bloodshot |
| TBA | Harbinger | Valiant Comics | Paul Downs Colaizzo | Paramount Pictures | Based on the comic book of the same name Produced by Original Film and DMG Entertainment |
| TBA | Harbinger Wars | Valiant Comics | TBA | TBA | A crossover between Harbinger and Bloodshot |
| TBA | Faith | Valiant Comics | TBA | TBA | Based on the comic book of the same name Produced by Original Film and DMG Entertainment |
| TBA | Shadowman | Valiant Comics | Reginald Hudlin | TBA | |
| TBA | Painkiller Jane | Dynamite Entertainment | TBA | Lotus Entertainment | Reboot of the same name |
| TBA | Barbarella | Dynamite Entertainment | Edgar Wright | Sony Pictures | Reboot of the same name |
| TBA | Django/Zorro | Dynamite Entertainment | TBA | Sony Pictures | Crossover sequel to Django Unchained & The Legend of Zorro. |
| TBA | Black | Black Mask Studios | Gerard McMurray | Warner Bros. Pictures | Produced by Studio 8 |
| TBA | Green Hornet and Kato | Holyoke Publishing, NOW Comics | Leigh Whannell | Universal Pictures | Reboot of the same name Co-produced with Amasia Entertainment |
| TBA | ThunderCats | Original | Adam Wingard | Warner Bros. Pictures | Based on the television series of the same name |
| TBA | Untitled Matrix film | Original | Drew Goddard | Warner Bros. Pictures | Part of The Matrix franchise. |
| TBA | Captain Planet | Original | TBA | Warner Bros. Pictures | Based on the television series of the same name |
| TBA | Hercules | Original | Guy Ritchie | Walt Disney Pictures | Reboot of the same name Produced by AGBO |
| TBA | G.I. Joe: Ever Vigilant | Hasbro | TBA | Paramount Pictures, Metro-Goldwyn-Mayer | Third installment of the G.I. Joe film series. |
| TBA | Untitled Snake Eyes follow-up film | Hasbro | TBA | Paramount Pictures, Metro-Goldwyn-Mayer | a follow-up to Snake Eyes; Co-produced with Skydance Media, Entertainment One and Di Bonaventura Pictures |
| TBA | RoboCop Returns | Original | Abe Forsythe | Metro-Goldwyn-Mayer | Second reboot to the RoboCop franchise |
| TBA | Untitled Hancock Sequel | Original | Peter Berg | Columbia Pictures | Sequel to Hancock |
| TBA | Untitled Chronicle Sequel | Original | TBA | 20th Century Fox | Sequel to Chronicle; Co-produced with Davis Entertainment |
| TBA | Mega Man | Capcom | Henry Joost and Ariel Schulman | Netflix | Based on a video game franchise of the same name Produced by Chernin Entertainment |
| TBA | One-Punch Man | Shueisha | Justin Lin | Columbia Pictures | Based on a manga of the same name Co-produced with Arad Productions and Perfect Storm Entertainment |
| TBA | Tiger & Bunny | Bandai Namco Holdings | TBA | Open Road Films | Based on a franchise of the same name Co-produced with Imagine Entertainment and Bandai Namco Arts |
| TBA | Astro Boy | Kobunsha | TBA | Sony Pictures | Based on a manga of the same name |
| TBA | Overwatch | Activision Blizzard | TBA | TBA | Based on a video game of the same name Co-produced with Activision Blizzard Studios |
| TBA | Miraculous | Original | Jeremy Zag | Lionsgate Films | Based on an animated series Co-produced with TF1 Studios, Skydance Media, Cross Creek Pictures, and ZAG Inc. |
| TBA | Untitled Austin Powers fourth film | Original | Jay Roach | New Line Cinema | Fourth installment of the Austin Powers film series. |
| TBA | Untitled Free Guy sequel | Original | TBA | 20th Century Fox | Sequel to Free Guy. |
| TBA | Tarzan | Original | TBA | Sony Pictures | A "total reinvention" of the character. |

=== Movie serials ===
| Year | Serial | Publisher | Director | Distributor | Notes |
|---|---|---|---|---|---|
| 1936 | Flash Gordon | King Features Syndicate | Frederick Stephani, Ray Taylor | Universal Pictures | A 13-chapter serial based on the Flash Gordon comic strip character |
| 1937 | Dick Tracy | Detroit Mirror | Alan James, Ray Taylor | Republic Pictures | A 15-chapter serial based on the comic strip Dick Tracy. |
| 1938 | Flash Gordon's Trip to Mars | King Features Syndicate | Ford Beebe, Robert F. Hill, Frederick Stephani | Universal Pictures | A 15-chapter serial based on the Flash Gordon comic strip character |
| 1938 | The Spider's Web | Popular Publications | James W. Horne/Ray Taylor | Columbia Pictures | A 15-chapter black-and-white serial based upon the Spider pulp magazine character |
| 1938 | Dick Tracy Returns | Detroit Mirror | William Witney, John English | Republic Pictures | Film featuring the comic character Dick Tracy. |
| 1938 | The Lone Ranger | WXYT (AM) | William Witney, John English | Republic Pictures | A 15-chapter serial based on the Lone Ranger character. |
| 1939 | The Lone Ranger Rides Again | WXYT (AM) | William Witney, John English | Republic Pictures | A 15-chapter serial based on the Lone Ranger character. |
| 1939 | Dick Tracy's G-Men | Detroit Mirror | William Witney, John English | Republic Pictures | A 15-chapter serial featuring the character Dick Tracy. |
| 1940 | The Green Hornet | Holyoke Publishing, NOW Comics | Ford Beebe, Ray Taylor | Universal Pictures | A 13-chapter black-and-white serial based on the Green Hornet radio series |
| 1940 | Mysterious Doctor Satan | Original | William Witney, John English | Republic Pictures | A 15-chapter black-and-white serial. |
| 1940 | The Shadow' | Street & Smith | James W. Horne | Columbia Pictures | A 15-chapter seriesl featuring The Shadow character. |
| 1941 | The Green Hornet Strikes Again! | Holyoke Publishing, NOW Comics | Ford Beebe, John Rawlins | Universal Pictures | A 15-chapter black-and-white serial based on the Green Hornet radio series |
| 1941 | The Spider Returns | Popular Publications | James W. Horne | Columbia Pictures | 15-chapter serial based on the Spider pulp comics. |
| 1941 | Dick Tracy vs. Crime, Inc. | Detroit Mirror | William Witney, John English | Republic Pictures | A 15-chapter serial featuring the character Dick Tracy. |
| 1943 | The Masked Marvel | Original | Spencer Gordon Bennet | Republic Pictures | A 12-chapter black-and-white serial |

== Animated ==
| Year | Film | Publisher | Director | Distributor | Worldwide gross | Notes |
|---|---|---|---|---|---|---|
| 1982 | Flash Gordon: The Greatest Adventure of All | Original | Danilo Bruni | Filmation | —N/a | Television film Based on the series of the same name |
| 1982 | Mighty Mouse in the Great Space Chase | Original | Various | CBS Television Distribution) | —N/a | Based on the character of the same name |
| 1985 | The Secret of the Sword | Original | Various | Atlantic Entertainment Group | Theatrical ($6,500,000) | Based on the two characters. |
| 1985 | He-Man & She-Ra: A Christmas Special | Original | Bob Forward, Don Heckman | Westinghouse Broadcasting | —N/a | Based on the two characters. |
| 1985 | Rainbow Brite and the Star Stealer | Hallmark Cards | Kimio Yabuki | Warner Bros. Pictures | Theatrical ($4,000,000.9) | Part of the Rainbow Brite media franchise. |
| 1986 | The Adventures of the American Rabbit | Original | Fred Wolf, Nobutaka Nishizawa | Clubhouse Pictures | Theatrical ($1,268,443) | |
| 1986 | GoBots: Battle of the Rock Lords | Original | Ray Patterson, Don Lusk, Alan Zaslove | Clubhouse Pictures | Theatrical ($1.3,0000,0000) | Film featuring two Tonka toylines. |
| 1986 | The Transformers: The Movie | Hasbro | Nelson Shin | De Laurentiis Entertainment Group | Theatrical ($5.000,000.8) | Film based on The Transformers television series. |
| 1987 | G.I. Joe: The Movie | Hasbro | Don Jurwich | Celebrity Home Entertainment | —N/a | Continuation of the television series G.I. Joe: A Real American Hero. |
| 1988 | BraveStarr: The Movie | Original | Tom Tataranowicz | Taurus Entertainmen | —N/a | Based on the toy franchise of the same name |
| 1993 | Jonny's Golden Quest | Original | Don Lusk, Paul Sommer | Warner Bros. Television Distribution | —N/a | Television film Based on the character of the same name |
| 1995 | Jonny Quest vs. The Cyber Insects | Original | Mario Piluso | Warner Bros. Television Distribution | —N/a | Television film Based on the character of the same name |
| 1995 | Gargoyles the Movie: The Heroes Awaken | Original | Various | Walt Disney Studios Home Entertainment | —N/a | Pilot for the television series Gargoyles. |
| 1995 | Mortal Kombat: The Journey Begins | Midway Games | —N/a | New Line Cinema | —N/a | Prequel to the Mortal Kombat film. |
| 1995 | Toy Story | Original | John Lasseter | Walt Disney Pictures | Theatrical ($394,436,586,4) | Made by Pixar |
| 1997 | Hercules | Original | John Musker, Ron Clements | Walt Disney Pictures | Theatrical ($252,000,000.7) | Film featuring the character Heracles. |
| 1998 | Hercules and Xena - The Animated Movie: The Battle for Mount Olympus | Original | Lynne Naylor | Universal Pictures Home Entertainment | —N/a | Part of the Hercules: The Legendary Journeys franchicse. |
| 1999 | The Iron Giant | Faber and Faber | Brad Bird | Warner Bros. Pictures | Theatrical ($31.3,000,000) | Film based on the novel The Iron Man by Ted Hughes. |
| 1999 | Tarzan | A.C. McClurg | Kevin Lima, Chris Buck | Walt Disney Pictures | Theatrical ($448.2,000,000) | Film featuring the character Tarzan. |
| 1999 | Hercules: Zero to Hero | Original | Bob Kline, Tad Stones, Phil Wenstein | Walt Disney Studios Home Entertainment | —N/a | Sequel to Hercules. |
| 1999 | Toy Story 2 | Original | John Lasseter | Walt Disney Pictures | Theatrical ($512,000,000) | Sequel to Toy Story |
| 2000 | Buzz Lightyear of Star Command: The Adventure Begins | Original | Tad Stones | Walt Disney Studios Home Entertainment | —N/a | Part of the Toy Story franchise. |
| 2001 | Osmosis Jones | Original | Various | Warner Bros. Pictures | Theatrical ($14,000,000) | Live-action animated film |
| 2002 | The Powerpuff Girls Movie | Original | Craig McCracken | Warner Bros. Pictures | Theatrical ($16,426,471) | Based on The Powerpuff Girls TV series |
| 2002 | Inspector Gadget's Last Case | Original | Michael Maliani | DIC Entertainment | —N/a | Television film Based on the character of the same name |
| 2002 | Groove Squad | Original | Patrick A. Ventura | DIC Entertainment | —N/a | A made-for-TV film that once aired on Nickelodeon |
| 2003 | Kim Possible: A Sitch in Time | Original | Steve Loter | Buena Vista Television | —N/a | Part of the Kim Possible franchise. |
| 2003 | The Animatrix | Original | Various | (Warner Bros. Home Entertainment | —N/a | Part of The Matrix franchise. |
| 2003 | Those Who Walk in Darkness | Grand Central Publishing | —N/a | Lightyear Entertainment | —N/a | Film based on the novel Those Who Walk in Darkness by John Ridley. |
| 2003 | G.I. Joe: Spy Troops | Hasbro | Dale Carman | Paramount Home Entertainment | —N/a | Part of the G.I. Joe: A Real American Hero franchise. |
| 2004 | The Big Superhero Wish | Original | Gary Conrad, Sarah Frost | Nickelodeon | —N/a | Television special A special to The Fairly Oddparents |
| 2004 | The Incredibles | Original | Brad Bird | Walt Disney Pictures | Theatrical ($631,442,092) | Made by Pixar |
| 2004 | Lady Death: The Motion Picture | Chaos! Comics | Andy Orjuela | A.D. Vision | —N/a | Film based on the comic book Lady Death by Brian Pulido. |
| 2004 | Max Steel: Endangered Species | Mattel | Sean Frewer | Warner Bros. Television | —N/a | Part of the Max Steel franchise. |
| 2004 | Van Helsing: The London Assignment | Constable & Robinson | Sharon Bridgeman | Universal Pictures Home Entertainment | —N/a | Prequel to the film Van Helsing |
| 2004 | The Chronicles of Riddick: Dark Fury | Original | Peter Chung | Universal Pictures Home Entertainment | —N/a | Part of The Chronicles of Riddick franchise. |
| 2004 | G.I. Joe: Valor vs. Venom | Hasbro | Dale Carman | Paramount Home Entertainment | —N/a | Sequel to G.I. Joe: Spy Troops. |
| 2005 | Mucha Lucha!: The Return of El Maléfico | Original | Ron Hughart | Warner Bros. Pictures | —N/a | Direct-to-video; Based on the show of the same name |
| 2005 | Mr. Incredible and Pals | Original | Various | Walt Disney Studios Home Entertainment | —N/a | Part of The Incredibles franchise. |
| 2005 | Inspector Gadget's Biggest Caper Ever | Original | Ezekiel Norton | DIC Entertainment | —N/a | Direct-to-video; Part of the Inspector Gadget franchise |
| 2005 | Kim Possible Movie: So the Drama | Original | Steve Loter | Buena Vista Television | —N/a | Part of the Kim Possible franchise. |
| 2005 | The Golden Blaze | Original | Bryon E. Casrson | Kidtoon Films | —N/a | |
| 2005 | Tarzan II | A.C. McClurg | Brian Smith | Walt Disney Studios Home Entertainment | —N/a | Sequel to Tarzan. |
| 2005 | Max Steel: Forces of Nature | Mattel | Sean Sullivan | Warner Bros. Television | —N/a | Part of the Max Steel franchise. |
| 2006 | Max Steel: Countdown | Mattel | Sean Sullivan | Warner Bros. Television | —N/a | Part of the Max Steel franchise. |
| 2007 | Mosaic | POW! Entertainment | Roy Allen Smith | Anchor Bay Entertainment | —N/a | Direct-to-video; Created by Stan Lee |
| 2007 | TMNT | Mirage Studios | Kevin Munroe | Warner Bros. Pictures, The Weinstein Company | Theatrical ($95,608,995) | Alternative sequel to 1991's Teenage Mutant Ninja Turtles II: The Secret of the Ooze |
| 2007 | Aqua Teen Hunger Force Colon Movie Film for Theaters | Original | Various | First Look Pictures | Theatrical ($5.5,000,000) | Film based on the television series Aqua Teen Hunger Force. |
| 2007 | The Condor | POW! Entertainment | Steven E. Gordon | Anchor Bay Entertainment | —N/a | Direct-to-video; Created by Stan Lee |
| 2007 | Ben 10: Secret of the Omnitrix | Original | Sebastian O. Montes III, Scooter Tidwell | Cartoon Network Studios | —N/a | Television film Based on Ben 10 TV series |
| 2007 | Phantom Planet | Original | Butch Hartman | Nickelodeon | —N/a | The series finale to Danny Phantom |
| 2007 | Veritas, Prince of Truth | Original | Arturo Ruiz-Esparza | Gaiam Vivendi Entertainment, Lightyear Entertainment | —N/a | |
| 2007 | Max Steel: Dark Rival | Mattel | William Lau | Warner Bros. Television | —N/a | Part of the Max Steel franchise. |
| 2008 | Turok: Son of Stone | Valiant Comics | Curt Geda, Dan Riba, Frank Squillace, Tad Stones | Universal Pictures (Classic Media) | —N/a | Direct-to-video |
| 2008 | Kung Fu Panda | Original | John Stevenson, Mark Osborne | Paramount Pictures, DreamWorks Animation | Theatrical ($631,000,000.7) | |
| 2008 | Bolt | Original | Chris Williams | Walt Disney Pictures | Theatrical ($310,000,000) | |
| 2009 | Garfield's Pet Force | Andrews McMeel Universal | Mark A.Z. Dippé, Kyung Ho Lee | 20th Century Fox Home Entertainment | —N/a | Direct-to-video; Based on the comic strip of the same name |
| 2009 | Astro Boy | Various | David Bowers | Summit Entertainment | Theatrical ($44,093,014) | Imagi Animation Studios film loosely based on the manga series of the same name |
| 2009 | Monsters vs. Aliens | Original | Conrad Vernon, Rob Letterman | Paramount Pictures, DreamWorks Animation | Theatrical ($381.5,000,000) | |
| 2009 | The Haunted World of El Superbeasto | MVCreations | Rob Zombie | Anchor Bay Entertainment | Theatrical ($10,000,000) | Film based on the comic by Rob Zombie. |
| 2009 | Turtles Forever | Mirage Studios | Roy Burdine; Lloyd Goldfine | 4Kids Entertainment | —N/a | Television film Crossover event, between the 1987 series and 2003 series |
| 2009 | Monsters vs. Aliens: Mutant Pumpkins from Outer Space | Original | Various | Paramount Pictures, DreamWorks Animation | —N/a | Part of the Monsters vs. Aliens |
| 2010 | Toy Story 3 | Original | Lee Unkrich | Walt Disney Pictures | Theatrical ($1,067,000,000) | Sequel to Toy Story 2 |
| 2010 | Megamind | Original | Tom McGrath | Paramount Pictures, DreamWorks Animation | Theatrical ($317,415,120) | |
| 2010 | Despicable Me | Original | Chris Renaud, Pierre Coffin | Universal Pictures | Theatrical ($543.2,000,000) | |
| 2010 | Kung-Fu Magoo | Original | Andres Couturier | Gaiam Vivendi Entertainment | Theatrical ($2.6,000,000) | Film featuring the animated character Mr. Magoo. |
| 2010 | Kung Fu Panda Holiday | Original | Tim Johnson | Paramount Pictures, DreamWorks Animation | —N/a | Part of the Kung Fu Panda franchise. |
| 2011 | Kung Fu Panda 2 | Original | Jennifer Yuh Nelson | Paramount Pictures, DreamWorks Animation | Theatrical ($665.7,000,000) | Sequel to Kung Fu Panda. |
| 2011 | Phineas and Ferb the Movie: Across the 2nd Dimension | Original | Various | Disney Television Animation | —N/a | Film features the superhero Perry the Platypus. |
| 2011 | Puss in Boots | Original | Chris Miller | Paramount Pictures, DreamWorks Animation | Theatrical ($555,000,000) | Part of the Shrek franchise. |
| 2012 | Ben 10: Destroy All Aliens | Victor Cook | Warner Bros. Television | —N/a | Television film Based on Ben 10 TV series | |
| 2012 | The Amazing Adventures of the Living Corpse | Dynamite Entertainment | Justin Paul Ritter | —N/a | Shoreline Productions | |
| 2012 | ParaNorman | Original | Sam Fell, Chris Butler | Focus Features | Theatrical ($107.1,000,000) | |
| 2012 | Puss in Boots: The Three Diablos | Original | Raman Hui | Paramount Pictures, DreamWorks Animation | —N/a | Part of the Puss in Boots franchise. |
| 2012 | Rise of the Guardians | William Joyce | Peter Ramsey | Paramount Pictures, DreamWorks Animation | Theatrical ($306,000,000.9} | Film based on the book The Guardians of Childhood. |
| 2013 | Jay & Silent Bob's Super Groovy Cartoon Movie | Original | Steve Stark | Phase 4 Films | Theatrical ($69,000) | Adaptation from the comic book Bluntman and Chronic by Kevin Smith, originally from his film Chasing Amy. |
| 2013 | Despicable Me 2 | Original | Chris Renaud, Pierre Coffin | Universal Pictures | Theatrical ($970.8,000,000) | Sequel to the film Despicable Me. |
| 2013 | Transformers Prime Beast Hunters: Predacons Rising | Hasbro | Duane Capizzi, Marsha Griffin, Steven Melching | Lionsgate Films (Entertainment One) | —N/a | Conclusion of the Transformers: Prime television series. |
| 2013 | Scooby-Doo! Mask of the Blue Falcon | Original | Michael Goguen | (Warner Bros. Home Entertainment | —N/a | Part of the Scooby-Doo franchise. |
| 2014 | Stan Lee's Mighty 7: Beginnings | Pow! Entertainment | Lee Ningning | Cinedigm, PGS Entertainment | —N/a | Aired on Hub Network |
| 2015 | The SpongeBob Movie: Sponge Out of Water | Nickelodeon | Paul Tibbitt | Paramount Pictures | Theatrical ($323,436,538) | Hybrid film with both live-action and animation Based on the SpongeBob SquarePants TV series Sequel to The SpongeBob SquarePants Movie |
| 2015 | Barbie in Princess Power | Mattel | Ezekiel Norton | Universal Pictures | —N/a | Limited theater release/widespread video release First superhero film with a solo female lead released in theaters since Elektra |
| 2015 | Minions | Original | Pierre Coffin, Kyle Balda | Universal Pictures | Theatrical ($1,159,398,397) | Spin off to the film Despicable Me. |
| 2015 | Scooby-Doo! and Kiss: Rock and Roll Mystery | Original | Spike Brandt, Tony Cervone | (Warner Bros. Home Entertainment | —N/a | Direct-to-video; Second superhero film based on rock band Kiss, crossover with Scooby-Doo franchise |
| 2015 | Sanjay's Super Team | Original | Sanjay Patel | Walt Disney Pictures | —N/a | |
| 2015 | Red Sonja: Queen of Plagues | Dynamite Entertainment | Gail Simone | Shout! Factory | —N/a | Film based on the comic Red Sonja. |
| 2016 | Zoolander: Super Model | Aaron Augenblick | Original | Augenblick Studios, Insurge Pictures, Red Hour Productions | —N/a | Film based on the Zoolander film series. |
| 2016 | Kung Fu Panda 3 | Jennifer Yuh Nelson | Original | 20th Century Fox, DreamWorks Animation | Theatrical ($521.1,000,000) | Third instalment of the Kung Fu Panda film series. |
| 2017 | Captain Underpants: The First Epic Movie | Scholastic Corporation | David Soren | 20th Century Fox, DreamWorks Animation | Theatrical ($125,364,252) | |
| 2017 | Despicable Me 3 | Original | Pierre Coffin, Kyle Balda | Universal Pictures | Theatrical ($1.035,000,000) | Third installment of the Despicable Me film series. |
| 2018 | Incredibles 2 | Original | Brad Bird | Walt Disney Pictures | Theatrical ($1,242,693,333) | Sequel to Pixar's The Incredibles |
| 2018 | Henchmen | Original | Adam Wood | Lionsgate Films (Entertainment One) | Theatrical ($1,469) | Limited theater release Based on the short film Henchmen: Ill Suited |
| 2019 | The Secret Life of Pets 2 | Original | Chris Renaud | Universal Pictures | Theatrical ($446.3,000,000) | Sequel to The Secret Life of Pets. The film features the character, Snowball, as a superhero. |
| 2019 | Toy Story 4 | Original | Josh Cooley | Walt Disney Pictures | Theatrical ($1,073,000,000) | Sequel to Toy Story 3 |
| 2019 | Steven Universe: The Movie | Original | Various | Cartoon Network Studios | —N/a | Continuation of the television series Steven Universe. |
| 2020 | Scoob! | Hanna-Barbera | Tony Cervone | Warner Bros. Pictures | Theatrical ($24,900,000) | Made by Warner Animation Group; Reboot to the Scooby-Doo Franchise |
| 2020 | Mortal Kombat Legends: Scorpion's Revenge | Warner Bros. Interactive Entertainment | Ethan Spaulding | (Warner Bros. Home Entertainment | —N/a | Film based on the Mortal Kombat video game franchise. |
| 2020 | Ben 10 Versus the Universe: The Movie | Original | Henrique Jardim and John McIntyre | Warner Bros. Television | Theatrical ($50,743) | Television film, released theatrically in UAE; Based on Ben 10 TV series |
| 2020 | Carmen Sandiego: To Steal or Not to Steal | Broderbund / The Learning Company | Jos Humphrey | Netflix | —N/a | Interactive spin-off film of the Carmen Sandiego television series. |
| 2020 | Phineas and Ferb the Movie: Candace Against the Universe | Original | Bob Bowen | Walt Disney Studios Motion Pictures (Disney Platform Distribution) | —N/a | Film featuring the superhero Perry the Platypus |
| 2021 | Paw Patrol: The Movie | Spin Master | Cal Brunker | Paramount Pictures | Theatrical ($144,327,371) | Based on Paw Patrol; Co-produced by Nickelodeon Movies |
| 2021 | Mortal Kombat Legends: Battle of the Realms | Warner Bros. Interactive Entertainment | Ethan Spaulding | (Warner Bros. Home Entertainment | —N/a | Sequel to the film Mortal Kombat Legends: Scorpion's Revenge. |
| 2021 | Trollhunters: Rise of the Titans | Disney-Hyperion and Hot Key Books | Johanne Matte; Francisco Ruiz Velasco; Andrew Schmidt | Universal Pictures (DreamWorks Animation Television) | —N/a | Part of the Trollhunters: Tales of Arcadia franchise. |
| 2022 | The Ice Age Adventures of Buck Wild | Original | John C. Donkin | Disney+ | —N/a | Spin-off of the Ice Age franchise. |
| 2022 | Lightyear | Original | Angus MacLane | Walt Disney Pictures | Theatrical ($226,425,420) | Made by Pixar; Prequel to Toy Story |
| 2022 | Minions: The Rise of Gru | Original | Kyle Balda | Universal Pictures | Theatrical ($940,482,695) | Sequel to Minions; Spin off to the film Despicable Me. |
| 2022 | Santaman | Original | Bret Stern | Film Mode Entertainment | —N/a | A Superhero take on Santa Claus. |
| 2022 | Rise of the Teenage Mutant Ninja Turtles: The Movie | Mirage Studios | Andy Suriano; Ant Ward | Netflix | —N/a | Based on Rise of the Teenage Mutant Ninja Turtles; Co-produced by Nickelodeon Movies |
| 2022 | Mortal Kombat Legends: Snow Blind | Warner Bros. Interactive Entertainment | Rick Morales | (Warner Bros. Home Entertainment | —N/a | Sequel to the film Mortal Kombat Legends: Battle of the Realms. |
| 2022 | Aqua Teen Forever: Plantasm | Original | Various | (Warner Bros. Home Entertainment | —N/a | Film based on the television series Aqua Teen Hunger Force. |
| 2022 | Puss in Boots: The Last Wish | Original | Joel Crawford | DreamWorks Animation | Theatrical ($484,329,137) | Sequel to Puss in Boots |
| 2023 | The Trident | Original | Matt Flynn | DreamWorks Animation | —N/a | Part of the Puss in Boots franchise. |
| 2023 | The Super Mario Bros. Movie | Nintendo | Aaron Horvath, Michael Jelenic | Universal Pictures | Theatrical ($1,360,783,214) | Film based on the Super Mario video game. |
| 2023 | Ruby Gillman, Teenage Kraken | Original | Kirk DeMicco | DreamWorks Animation | Theatrical ($46,247,409) | |
| 2023 | Nimona | HarperCollins | Nick Bruno and Troy Quane | Netflix | —N/a | Based on the graphic novel of the same name. |
| 2023 | The Venture Bros.: Radiant Is the Blood of the Baboon Heart | Original | Jackson Publick | (Warner Bros. Home Entertainment | —N/a | Finale for the television series The Venture Bros. |
| 2023 | Teenage Mutant Ninja Turtles: Mutant Mayhem | Mirage Studios | Jeff Rowe | Paramount Pictures | Theatrical ($181,935,518) | Co-produced by Nickelodeon Movies and Point Grey Pictures |
| 2023 | The Monkey King | Original | Anthony Stacchi | Netflix | —N/a | |
| 2023 | Paw Patrol: The Mighty Movie | Spin Master | Cal Brunker | Paramount Pictures | Theatrical ($205,098,869) | Based on Paw Patrol; Sequel to Paw Patrol: The Movie; Co-produced by Nickelodeon Movies |
| 2023 | Mortal Kombat Legends: Cage Match | Warner Bros. Games | Ethan Spaulding | (Warner Bros. Home Entertainment | —N/a | Sequel to the film Mortal Kombat Legends: Snow Blind. |
| 2024 | The Tiger's Apprentice | HarperCollins | Raman Hui | Paramount+ | —N/a | Based on a book of the same name. |
| 2024 | Megamind vs. the Doom Syndicate | Original | Eric Fogel | Universal Pictures (DreamWorks Animation Television) | —N/a | Sequel to Megamind. |
| 2024 | Kung Fu Panda 4 | Original | Mike Mitchell | DreamWorks Animation | Theatrical ($547,946,428) | Fourth instalment of the Kung Fu Panda film series. |
| 2024 | Ultraman: Rising | Tsuburaya Productions | Shannon Tindle, John Aoshima | Netflix | —N/a | A freature film in the Ultraman franchise. |
| 2024 | Despicable Me 4 | Original | Chris Renaud | Universal Pictures | Theatrical ($972,015,909) | Fourth installment of the Despicable Me film series. |
| 2024 | Ryan's World the Movie: Titan Universe Adventure | Original | Albie Hecht | Falling Forward Films | Theatrical ($624,429) | a feature film for Ryan's World; Live-action-animated. |
| 2024 | Transformers One | Hasbro | Josh Cooley | Paramount Pictures | Theatrical ($129,408,392) | Animated Movie the Transformers film series Made by Paramount Animation. |
| 2025 | Dog Man | Scholastic Corporation | Peter Hastings | DreamWorks Animation | Theatrical ($145,546,959) | Based on the book of the same name. |
| 2025 | KPop Demon Hunters | Original | Maggie Kang, Chris Appelhans | Netflix | Theatrical ($24,619,953) | |
| 2025 | The Lost Chapter: Yuki's Revenge | Original | Quentin Tarantino | Epic Games | —N/a | a short film to promote Fortnite and Kill Bill: The Whole Bloody Affair. |
| 2025 | Teenage Mutant Ninja Turtles: Chrome Alone 2 – Lost in New Jersey | Mirage Studios | Kent Seki | Paramount Pictures | —N/a | Short film of Teenage Mutant Ninja Turtles: Mutant Mayhem; Co-produced by Nickelodeon Movies and Point Grey Pictures |
| 2026 | The Super Mario Galaxy Movie | Nintendo | Aaron Horvath, Michael Jelenic | Universal Pictures | Theatrical ($1,007,512,277) | Sequel to The Super Mario Bros. Movie. |
| 2026 | Toy Story 5 | Original | Andrew Stanton | Walt Disney Pictures | Theatrical ($366,656,204) | Sequel to Toy Story 4 |
| 2026 | Minions & Monsters | Original | Pierre Coffin | Universal Pictures | Theatrical ($26,376,364) | Sequel to Minions: The Rise of Gru; Spin off to the film Despicable Me. |
| 2026 | Avatar Aang: The Last Airbender | Nickelodeon | Lauren Montgomery | Paramount+ | —N/a | Based on the Avatar: The Last Airbender series. Made by Paramount Animation. |
| 2026 | Paw Patrol: The Dino Movie | Spin Master | Cal Brunker | Paramount Pictures | Theatrical ($68,754,688) | Based on Paw Patrol; Made by Paramount Animation; Sequel to Paw Patrol: The Mighty Movie; Co-produced by Nickelodeon Movies |

=== Upcoming ===
| Year | Film | Publisher | Director | Distributor | Notes |
|---|---|---|---|---|---|
| 2027 | Untitled Teenage Mutant Ninja Turtles: Mutant Mayhem sequel | Mirage Studios | Jeff Rowe | Paramount Pictures | Sequel to Teenage Mutant Ninja Turtles: Mutant Mayhem; Co-produced by Nickelodeon Movies and Point Grey Pictures |
| 2028 | Untitled Illumination/Nintendo event film | Nintendo | —N/a | Universal Pictures | Spin-off to The Super Mario Bros. Movie. |
| 2028 | Incredibles 3 | Original | Peter Sohn | Walt Disney Pictures | Sequel to Pixar's Incredibles 2 |
| 2029 | Untitled Third Mario film | Nintendo | —N/a | Universal Pictures | Sequel to The Super Mario Galaxy Movie. |
| 2029 | Untitled KPop Demon Hunters Sequel | Original | Maggie Kang, Chris Appelhans | Netflix | Sequel to KPop Demon Hunters. |
| 2029 | Untitled Paw Patrol: The Dino Movie Sequel | Spin Master | Cal Brunker | Paramount Pictures | Based on Paw Patrol; Made by Paramount Animation; Sequel to Paw Patrol: The Dino Movie; Co-produced by Nickelodeon Movies |
| TBA | Kung Fu Panda 5 | Original | Mike Mitchell | DreamWorks Animation | Fifth instalment of the Kung Fu Panda film series. |
| TBA | Debut: A KPop Demon Hunters Story | Original | Maggie Kang, Chris Appelhans | Netflix | |
| TBA | Relatively Super | Original | Sonny Dyon | QiCo Films | Television film |
| TBA | Super Day Care | Original | TBA | Paramount Pictures | Co-production with Skydance Animation and Outlier Society Productions |
| TBA | Legion of 5 | POW! Entertainment | TBA | Rainmaker Entertainment | |
| TBA | Mighty Mouse | Terrytoons | TBA | Paramount Pictures | Based on the Mighty Mouse TV series Made by Paramount Animation; Produced by Maximum Effort |
| TBA | Untitled Rainbow Brite film | Hallmark Cards | TBA | TBA | Produced by Hallmark Media, Crayola Studios and Original Film second feature film of Rainbow Brite. |

== See also ==
- List of Indian superhero films
- List of superhero productions created by Toei
- List of films based on comics
- List of films based on comic strips
- List of films based on English-language comics
- List of films based on French-language comics
- List of films based on manga
- List of films based on radio series
- List of films based on video games
- List of television programs based on comics
- List of superhero television series
- List of highest-grossing superhero films
- List of films based on Pulp Magazine
- List of martial arts films
- List of mixed martial arts films
- List of ninja films
- List of sword and sorcery films
- Lists of science fiction films
  - List of science fiction action films
  - List of science fiction comedy films
  - List of science fiction horror films
- List of apocalyptic films
- List of dystopian films
- List of extraterrestrial films
