= Courage & Stupidity =

- Film poster
- Directed by: Darin Beckstead
- Screenplay by: Darin Beckstead
- Produced by: Guillermo Suescum; Herbert Christiansen
- Starring: Todd Wall; Aaron Fiore; Kahil Dotay; Tom Bitler
- Cinematography: Brian Sullivan
- Edited by: Nick Kougioulis
- Music by: Non-Stop
- Distributed by: Netflix
- Release date: April 23, 2005 (United States)
- Running time: 25 minutes
- Country: United States
- Language: English

Courage and Stupidity (Courage & Stupidity) is a 2005 short fictional American comedy film written and directed by Darin Beckstead.

== Synopsis ==
Courage & Stupidity reimagines Steven Spielberg's making of Jaws. The story fantasizes of how the filming of that movie and the director's early career is challenged when the mechanical shark breaks down during production.

Courage & Stupidity derives its title from a statement made by Mr. Spielberg about his behind-the-scenes memories of the 1970s blockbuster. Courage & Stupidity also contains numerous easter-egg references to other Spielberg films.

== Cast ==
- Todd Wall as Steven
- Aaron Fiore as George
- Kahil Dotay as Ricky

== Release ==
The film screened at Fantasia, the Sitges Film Festival, and was distributed by Netflix.

== Reception ==
Film Threat gave the film a rather positive review.
