= Somebody's Hero =

Somebody's Hero may refer to:

- "Somebody's Hero" (song), a 2004 song by Jamie O'Neal
- Somebody's Hero (film), a 2012 American family feature film
