= Bernard Fox (actor) =

Welsh actor (1927–2016)

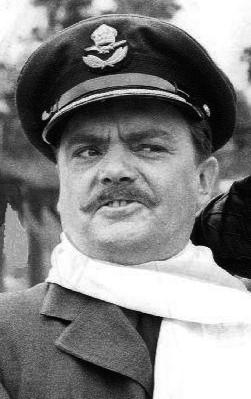
- Fox in Hogan's Heroes (1968)
- Born: Bernard Lawson; 11 May 1927; Port Talbot, Glamorgan, Wales
- Died: 14 December 2016 (aged 89); Van Nuys, California, U.S.
- Occupation: Actor
- Years active: 1955–2004
- Spouse: Jacqueline Fox (m. 1962)
- Children: 2
- Relatives: Wilfrid Lawson (uncle)

Bernard Lawson (11 May 1927 – 14 December 2016), better known as Bernard Fox, was a Welsh actor. He is remembered for his roles as Dr. Bombay in the comedy fantasy series Bewitched (1964–1972) of which he was the last surviving adult cast member, Colonel Crittendon in the comedy series Hogan's Heroes (1965–1971), Malcolm Merriweather in The Andy Griffith Show (1963–1965), Max in Herbie Goes to Monte Carlo (1977), Archibald Gracie IV in the film Titanic (1997), and Captain Winston Havelock in The Mummy (1999)

== Early life ==
Fox was a fifth-generation performer. He was born in Port Talbot, Glamorgan, Wales the son of Queenie (née Barrett) and Gerald Lawson, both stage actors. He had an older sister, Mavis, and his uncle was British actor Wilfrid Lawson.

== Career ==
=== Film ===
Fox began his film career at the age of 18 months and by age 14 was an apprentice assistant manager of a theatre. After serving with the Royal Navy in World War II and the Korean War, he resumed his acting career and appeared in over 30 cinema films from 1956 to 2004, including two cinematic dramatizations of the sinking of the doomed passenger liner the RMS Titanic, separated by 39 years, viz, Titanic (1997) (as Colonel Archibald Gracie IV) and an earlier version of the tragedy A Night to Remember (1958) uncredited as Frederick Fleet, appearing very briefly in the film but with the memorable line, "Iceberg, dead ahead sir!" as a lookout stationed in the ship's crow's nest. His other screen roles ranged from supporting parts in broad comedies (Yellowbeard, Herbie Goes to Monte Carlo, and The Private Eyes, playing a homicidal butler in the last) to supplying the voice of the Chairmouse in the Disney animated features The Rescuers and The Rescuers Down Under. He played the role of Winston Havelock, a put-out-to-grass former Royal Flying Corps airman in the 1999 adventure film The Mummy. In 2004, Fox made his final appearance in Surge of Power: The Stuff of Heroes.

=== Television ===
In 1961, he played Malcolm in all 26 episodes in the comedy series Three Live Wires.

Between 1967 and 1972, Fox portrayed the witch doctor Dr. Bombay on 18 episodes of the sitcom Bewitched. His first appearance on that show was not as Dr. Bombay, though, but as a professional witch debunker, Osgood Rightmire, in 1966. He reprised the role of Dr. Bombay on the 1977 sequel series Tabitha, again in 1999 on the soap opera Passions, and spoofed it as a genie doctor ("wish doctor") in a 1989 episode of Pee-wee's Playhouse. Fox was one of the last surviving adult recurring cast members of Bewitched, leaving Nancy Kovack (who portrayed character Darrin Stephens' ex-girlfriend Sheila throughout the series) and Bernie Kopell (who appeared as various characters in 9 episodes) as the only remaining adult cast members upon his death; child actors Erin Murphy and David Lawrence, who portrayed Darrin and Samantha's children (Tabitha and Adam) are still alive.

Between 1965 and 1970, Fox portrayed the bumbling "Colonel" Rodney Crittendon on eight episodes of Hogan's Heroes (Crittendon is a Royal Air Force group captain, the equivalent of the American rank of colonel, which was used to avoid confusion for the show's U.S. audience). He appeared in two episodes in the detective mystery series Columbo, "Dagger of the Mind" and "Troubled Waters". Fox also appeared as English valet Malcolm Meriweather in three episodes of The Andy Griffith Show and in Knight Rider as Commander Smiths in season two, episode eight.

Fox appeared as a British major in "The Phantom Major", episode three of F Troop and in "Tea and Empathy", episode 18 of season six of M*A*S*H. In 1964, Fox appeared in episode 117 of The Dick Van Dyke Show, titled "Girls Will Be Boys". Fox plays the father of a little girl who keeps beating up Richie Petrie. He also appeared in "Teacher's Petrie", where he played a night-school creative-writing teacher, and in "Never Bathe on Saturday" as the house detective. In 1965, Fox made a guest appearance on Perry Mason as Peter Stange in "The Case of the Laughing Lady".

Fox also appeared in McHale's Navy, in The Man from U.N.C.L.E. ("The Thor Affair" episode as munitions magnate Brutus Thor, intent on assassinating a "Gandhi-like" figure who's attempting to bring world peace (1966), as well as in the two-part episode "The Bridge of Lions Affair" in 1966, wherein he starred as THRUSH agent Jordin, whose constant response to each additional assignment is, "I'll look into it"), and in the Murder, She Wrote episode "One White Rose for Death" in 1986. In addition, he co-starred as Dr. Watson with Michael Evans as Sherlock Holmes in Sherlock & Me in the early 1980s.

== Personal life ==
Fox and his wife had two daughters, Amanda and Valerie.

== Death ==
On the morning of 14 December 2016, Fox died of heart failure at Valley Presbyterian Hospital in Van Nuys, California. He was 89 years old.

== Filmography ==
=== Film ===
Year	Title	Role	Notes
1956	Soho Incident	McLeod	
1956	Home and Away	Johnnie Knowles	
1956	The Counterfeit Plan	Detective Sergeant	
1957	Scotland Yard film series	Sergeant Conway	Inside Information
1957	Blue Murder at St. Trinian's	Photographer	Uncredited
1958	The Safecracker	Shafter	
1958	A Night to Remember	Lookout Frederick Fleet	Uncredited
1958	The Two-Headed Spy	Lieutenant	
1959	Captured	Morrison	Uncredited
1962	The Longest Day	Pvt. Hutchinson	Uncredited
1963	The List of Adrian Messenger	Lynch	Uncredited
1964	Honeymoon Hotel	Room Clerk	
1964	Quick, Before It Melts	Leslie Folliott	
1965	Strange Bedfellows	Policeman	
1966	Munster, Go Home!	Squire Lester Moresby	
1966	Hold On!	Dudley Hawks	
1966	One of Our Spies Is Missing	Jordin	
1968	Star!	Asst. to Lord Chamberlain	Uncredited
1968	The Bamboo Saucer	Ephram	
1971	Big Jake	Scottish Shepherd	Uncredited
1971	The Million Dollar Duck	Car Salesman	Uncredited
1973	Arnold	Constable Hooke	
1977	The Rescuers	The Chairman	Voice
1977	Herbie Goes to Monte Carlo	Max	
1978	The House of the Dead	Inspector McDowal	
1980	The Private Eyes	Justin	
1980	Gauguin the Savage	Captain Chablat	
1983	Yellowbeard	Tarbuck	
1988	18 Again!	Horton	
1990	The Rescuers Down Under	Chairman / Doctor	Voice
1997	Titanic	Col. Archibald Gracie	
1999	The Mummy	Capt. Winston Havelock	
2004	Surge of Power: The Stuff of Heroes	Himself	Final film role

=== Television ===
Year	Title	Role	Notes
1955–1956	Sixpenny Corner	Tom Norton	10 episodes
1957	Wire Service	Naval Officer	Episode: "Atom at Spithead"
1958	Victory	Performer	TV movie
1959	Dixon of Dock Green	Smiler Hodges	Episode: "A Case for the Inland Revenue"
1959	The Golden Spur	Soldier at Inn	Episode: #1.3
1959	ITV Television Playhouse	Morton Leslie	Episode: "Ticket for Tomorrow"
1960	No Hiding Place	Insp. Brighouse	Episode: "The Golden Crown"
1960	The Love of Mike	Malcolm Danders	2 episodes
1960	ITV Play of the Week	Captain Scott	Episode: "Beyond the Horizon"
1961	Armchair Theatre	Barman	Episode: "Honeymoon Postponed"
1961	Three Live Wires	Malcolm	26 episodes
1962–1963	The Danny Thomas Show	Alfie Wingate	4 episodes
1963	Ensign O'Toole	Hastings	Episode: "Operation – Intrigue"
1963	The Great Adventure	Redcoat Lt.	Episode: "A Boy at War"
1963–1965	The Andy Griffith Show	Malcolm Merriweather	3 episodes
1964	McHale's Navy	Sub-Lieutenant Clivedon	Episode: "The British Also Have Ensigns"
1964–1965	The Dick Van Dyke Show	Various Roles	3 episodes
1964–1966	Twelve O'Clock High	Sgt. Major Higgins / Maj. Dutton / Colonel Charles	3 episodes
1965	Perry Mason	Peter Stange	Episode: "The Case of the Laughing Lady"
1965	F-Troop	Major Bently Royce	Episode: "The Phantom Major"
1965	The Flintstones	Eppy Brianstone	Voice, Episode: "No Biz Like Show Biz"
1965	I Spy	Harold	Episode: "Carry Me Back to Old Tsing-Tao"
1965–1970	Hogan's Heroes	Col. Crittendon	8 episodes
1966	I Dream of Jeannie	Arnie	Episode: "Is There an Extra Jeannie in the House?"
1966	The Man from U.N.C.L.E.	Jordin / Brutus Thor	3 episodes
1966–1972	Bewitched	Dr. Bombay	19 episodes
1968	The Monkees	Sir Twiggly	Episode: "Monkees Mind Their Manor"
1969	Daniel Boone	Carruthers	Episode: "A Bearskin for Jamie Blue"
1969	Here Come the Brides	Father Ned	Episode: "The Wealthiest Man in Seattle"
1971	Night Gallery	Mr. Canby / Ghost	Segment: "House with Ghost"
1971–1973	Love, American Style	Jocko / Oliver / Marshall	3 episodes
1972	The Hound of the Baskervilles	Dr. Watson	ABC Movie of the Week
1972	Columbo	Det. Chief William Durk	Episode: "Dagger of the Mind"
1973	Intertect	Barrett	TV movie
1975	Columbo	Purser Watkins	Episode: "Troubled Waters"
1975	Barnaby Jones	Colonel George Redford	Episode: "Jeopardy for Two"
1975	Cannon	Allen Farrell	Episode: "The Victim"
1975	Emergency!	Mr. Kern	2 episodes
1977–1978	Tabitha	Dr. Bombay	2 episodes
1978	Soap	Randolph Gatling	Episode: #1.5
1978	M*A*S*H	Major Ross	Episode: "Tea and Empathy"
1978	What's Happening!!	Britisher	Episode: "Diplomatic Immunity"
1979	Fantasy Island	Brian Lipscomb	Episode: "Amusement Park/Rock Stars"
1980	The Dukes of Hazzard	Higgins the Butler	Episode: "Southern Comfurts"
1980	Lou Grant	Clive Whitcomb	Episode: "Libel"
1981	Scooby-Doo and Scrappy-Doo		Voice
1981	The Love Boat	Henry Whitewood	Season 5 – Episode 10
1982	Hart to Hart	Nigel Hegland	Episode: "Million Dollar Harts"
1982	The Jeffersons	Andrew Derek	2 episodes
1983	Gun Shy	Sir Charles W.R.	Episode: "Western Velvet"
1983	Knight Rider	Comm. Smythe	Episode: "Custom K.I.T.T."
1984	Hotel	Adam Partridge	Episode: "Ideals"
1984	Simon & Simon	Rupert Ginnias	Episode: "Revolution 9 1/2"
1985	The Fall Guy	Santa	Episode: "Escape Claus"
1986	Riptide	Prof. Holcombe	Episode: "The Play's the Thing"
1986	Murder, She Wrote	Andrew Wyckham	Episode: "One White Rose for Death"
1988	Punky Brewster	Whitmore	Episode: "Aunt Larnese Is Coming to Town"
1989	Pee-wee's Playhouse	Dr. Jinga-Janga	Episode: "Sick? Did Somebody Say Sick?"
1990	Chip 'n Dale: Rescue Rangers	Professor, Radio Voice, Jewelry Store Owner	Voice, Episode: "Gorilla My Dreams"
1999–2000	Passions	Dr. Bombay	3 episodes
2001	Dharma & Greg	Henry Cooper	Episode: "Without Reservations"
2003	Time Squad	Sir Henry Morton Stanley	Voice, Episode: "Out with the In Crowd"

== Awards and nominations ==
Year	Award	Category	Title	Result
1997	Screen Actors Guild	Outstanding Cast in a Motion Picture	Titanic	Nominated
