= List of television series and films based on IDW Publishing publications =

Below is a list of television series and feature films based on characters and concepts that have appeared in IDW Publishing publications, including its various imprints. This list includes live action and animated television series and films.

== Television ==
=== Live-action ===
Title	Seasons	Episodes	Original airing	Production company	Network	Notes / Refs
Dick Tracy	1	48	1950–51	Detroit Mirror / P.K. Palmer Productions	CBS	Dick Tracy
Sable	1	7	1987–88	First Comics / Sherman-Rosetti Productions / Taft Broadcasting	ABC	Jon Sable
Ninja Turtles: The Next Mutation	1	26	1997–98	Saban Entertainment / Mirage Studios	Fox	Teenage Mutant Ninja Turtles
The Crow: Stairway to Heaven	1	22	1998–99	Crow Productions / Alliance Films / Alliance Atlantis / Crescent Entertainment / PolyGram Filmed Entertainment	Syndication	The Crow
Wynonna Earp	4	49	2016–21	SEVEN24 Films / IDW Entertainment / Cineflix Studios / Dynamic Television / Cineflix Rights	Syfy	
V Wars	1	10	2019	IDW Entertainment / High Park Entertainment / Marada Pictures	Netflix	
October Faction	1	10	2020	IDW Entertainment / High Park Entertainment	Netflix	
Locke & Key	3	28	2020–22	Genre Arts / IDW Entertainment / Circle of Confusion	Netflix	Acquired the series from Hulu
Surfside Girls	1	10	2022	Endeavor Content / IDW Entertainment	Apple TV+	Kim Dwinell
Essex County	1	5	2023	First Generarion Films	CBC	Jeff Lemire

=== Web series ===
Title	Year	Production company	Airing location	Notes / Refs
30 Days of Night: Blood Trails	2007	Ghost House Pictures	Fearnet	7 episodes
30 Days of Night: Dust to Dust	2008	Ghost House Pictures	Fearnet	6 episodes, sequel to Blood Trails

=== Pilots ===
Title	Year	Production company	Network	Notes / Refs
Locke & Key	2011	DreamWorks Television / Amblin Television / Davis Entertainment	Fox Broadcasting Company	Passed over

=== Animated series ===
Title	Original airing	Production company	Network	Notes & Ref(s)
Popeye the Sailor	1960–1963	King Features Syndicate / Famous Studios /Rembrandt Films / Halas and Batchelor / Larry Harmon Pictures / Gerald Ray Studios / Jack Kenny Productions	Syndication	Popeye
The Dick Tracy Show	1961–1962	Detroit Mirror / United Productions of America	Syndication	Dick Tracy.
Speed Racer	1967–1968	Shueisha / Asahi Sonorama / Fusosha Publishing / Tatsunoko Production	Fuji TV	Speed Racer
The All New Popeye Hour	1978–1983	King Features Syndicate / Hanna-Barbera / Taft Broadcasting	CBS	Popeye
Popeye and Son	1987	King Features Syndicate / Hanna-Barbera	CBS	Popeye
DuckTales	1987–1990	Dell Comics / Gladstone Publishing / Disney Comics / Gemstone Publishing / Boom! Kids / Disney Television Animation	Syndication	Uncle Scrooge
Teenage Mutant Ninja Turtles	1987–96	Fred Wolf Films / Mirage Studios	Syndication	Teenage Mutant Ninja Turtles
Darkwing Duck	1991-1992	Walt Disney Television Animation / Walt Disney Television	Syndication	
The New Adventures of Speed Racer	1993	Shueisha / Fred Wolf Films	Syndication	Speed Racer
The Maxx	1995	Image Comics / MTV Animation / Rough Draft Studios	MTV	The Maxx
Mutant Turtles: Superman Legend	1996	Mirage Studios / Bee Media / Tsuburaya Productions	Syndication	Teenage Mutant Ninja Turtles
Quack Pack	1996	Walt Disney Television Animation	Syndication	Donald Duck
Speed Racer X	1997	Shueisha / DIC Entertainment / Funimation	TV Tokyo	Speed Racer
House of Mouse	2001-2003	Walt Disney Television Animation	ABC / Toon Disney	Mickey Mouse, Disney Animated Canon
Teenage Mutant Ninja Turtles	2003–09	Mirage Studios / Dong Woo Animation / 4Kids Entertainment	Fox	Teenage Mutant Ninja Turtles
Speed Racer: The Next Generation	2008–2013	Shueisha / Speed Racer Enterprises / Animation Collective / Toonz Animation India / Lionsgate Television	Nicktoons	Speed Racer
Teenage Mutant Ninja Turtles	2012–17	Mirage Studios / Nickelodeon Animation Studios / LowBar Productions	Nickelodeon	Teenage Mutant Ninja Turtles
TMNT Team Up: The Short Series	2017	Mirage Studios / Nickelodeon Animation Studios / LowBar Productions	Nickelodeon	Teenage Mutant Ninja Turtles
Ducktales	2017–2021	Dell Comics / Disney Television Animation	Disney+	Uncle Scrooge
DuckTales Shorts	2017	Dell Comics / Disney Television Animation	Disney+	Uncle Scrooge
Rise of the Teenage Mutant Ninja Turtles	2018–2020	Mirage Studios / Nickelodeon Animation Studios	Nickelodeon	Teenage Mutant Ninja Turtles
Popeye's Island Adventures	2018	King Features Syndicate / WildBrain Spark	YouTube	Popeye
Legend of the Three Caballeros	2018	Disney Digital Network / 6 Point Harness / Atomic Cartoons / Mercury Filmworks	DisneyLife	Donald Duck
DuckTales: Theme Song Takeover	2019	Dell Comics / Disney Television Animation	Disney+	Uncle Scrooge
The Rocketeer	2019–2020	Wild Canary Animation / Icon Creative Studios	Disney Junior	Rocketeer
Samurai Rabbit: The Usagi Chronicles	2022	Dark Horse Comics / Netflix Animation / Atomic Monster / Dark Horse Entertainment / Gaumont Animation	Netflix	Usagi Yojimbo
Tales of the Teenage Mutant Ninja Turtles	2024–25	Point Grey Pictures / Nickelodeon Animation Studio	Paramount+	Teenage Mutant Ninja Turtles.
Teeny Mutant Ninja Turtles	2026–present	TBA	YouTube	Teenage Mutant Ninja Turtles

=== Top Shelf Productions ===
Title	Original airing	Production company	Network	Notes & Ref(s)
SuperFuckers	2012–13	Top Shelf Productions / Frederator Studios	Cartoon Hangover	

== Film ==
=== Live-action ===
Year	Title	Production studio(s)	Notes
1945	Dick Tracy	Detroit Mirror / RKO Radio Productions	
1946	Dick Tracy vs. Cueball	Detroit Mirror / RKO Pictures	
1947	Dick Tracy's Dilemma	Detroit Mirror / RKO Pictures	
1947	Dick Tracy Meets Gruesome	Detroit Mirror / RKO Pictures	
1980	Popeye	King Features Syndicate / Paramount Pictures / Walt Disney Pictures / Robert Evans Productions	
1990	Dick Tracy	Detroit Mirror / Touchstone Pictures / Silver Screen Partners	
1990	Teenage Mutant Ninja Turtles	Golden Harvest / Limelight Entertainment / 888 Productions / Mirage Enterprises / Northshore Investments / New Line Cinema	
1991	Teenage Mutant Ninja Turtles II: The Secret of the Ooze	Golden Harvest / Mirage Enterprises / Northshore Investments / New Line Cinema / 20th Century Fox	
1991	The Rocketeer	Walt Disney Pictures	Co-produced with Touchstone Pictures
1993	Teenage Mutant Ninja Turtles III	Golden Harvest / Clearwater Holdings / New Line Cinema / 20th Century Fox	
1994	The Crow	Dimension Films / Miramax	
1995	Tank Girl	United Artists / Trilogy Entertainment Group	
1995	Judge Dredd	TI Media / Rebellion Developments / Hollywood Pictures / Cinergi Pictures / Edward R. Pressman Film Corporation	
1996	The Crow: City of Angels	Dimension Films / Miramax	
1997	Ninja Turtles: The Next Mutation - East Meets West		
2000	The Crow: Salvation	IMF / Edward R. Pressman Film Corporation / Jeff Most Productions / Pacifica Film Development / Dimension Films	
2001	From Hell	Top Shelf Productions/Underworld Pictures	From Hell
2003	The League of Extraordinary Gentlemen	America's Best Comics/WildStorm/DC Comics/Top Shelf Productions/Knockabout Comics/20th Century Studios/Angry Films/International Production Company/JD Productions	The League of Extraordinary Gentlemen, Volume III: Century
2005	The Crow: Wicked Prayer	Dimension Films	
2007	30 Days of Night	Sony Pictures Releasing	Co-produced with Dark Horse Entertainment and Ghost House Pictures
2008	Speed Racer	Shueisha / Village Roadshow Pictures / Silver Pictures / Anarchos Productions	
2010	30 Days of Night: Dark Days	Sony Pictures Home Entertainment	Direct-to-video, co-produced with Ghost House Pictures, Stage 6 Films, RCR Media Group, and Dark Horse Entertainment
2011	Remains	Synthetic Cinema International / Remains / Chiller Films	
2012	Dredd	TI Media / Rebellion Developments / DNA Films / IM Global / Reliance Entertainment	
2014	Teenage Mutant Ninja Turtles	Nickelodeon Movies / Platinum Dunes / Gama Entertainment / Mednick Productions / Heavy Metal / Paramount Pictures	
2016	Teenage Mutant Ninja Turtles: Out of the Shadows	Nickelodeon Movies / Movie Media Group / Alibaba Pictures / Platinum Dunes / Gama Entertainment / Mednick Productions / Smithrowe Entertainment / Paramount Pictures	
2024	The Crow	Hassell Free Productions / Electric Shadow Company / Davis Films / Edward R. Pressman Film Corporation / 30WEST	
2025	Popeye's Revenge	ITN Studios	
2025	Shiver Me Timbers	Gravitas Ventures / Alpake Entertainment / Edinburgh Film Productions	
2025	Popeye the Slayer Man	Vantage Media / Millman Productions / Otsego Media / Ron Lee Productions / Salem House Films	

=== Animated ===
Year	Title	Production Studio(s)	Notes
1972	Popeye Meets the Man Who Hated Laughter	King Features Syndicate /Filmation	
1979	The Popeye Valentine Special: Sweethearts at Sea		Popeye
1987	Teenage Mutant Ninja Turtles: The Turtles' Awesome Easter		Teenage Mutants Ninja Turtles
1987	DuckTales: Treasure of the Golden Suns	Dell Comics / Walt Disney Pictures/Disneytoon Studios/Disney Animation France	Uncle Scrooge
1987	DuckTales: Catch as Cash Can	Dell Comics / Walt Disney Pictures/Disneytoon Studios/Disney Animation France	Uncle Scrooge
1988	DuckTales: Time is Money	Dell Comics / Walt Disney Pictures/Disneytoon Studios/Disney Animation France	Uncle Scrooge
1990	DuckTales the Movie: Treasure of the Lost Lamp	Dell Comics / Walt Disney Pictures/Disneytoon Studios/Disney Animation France	Uncle Scrooge
1991	Teenage Mutant Ninja Turtles: Planet of the Turtleoids		Teenage Mutant Ninja Turtles
2001	Mickey's Magical Christmas: Snowed in at the House of Mouse	Walt Disney Television Animation	Disney's House of Mouse, Mickey Mouse
2002	Mickey's House of Villians	Walt Disney Television Animation	House of Mouse
2004	Popeye's Voyage: The Quest for Pappy	King Features Syndicate/Mainframe Studios/Nuance Productions	
2007	TMNT	Imagi Animation Studios/Warner Bros. Pictures/The Weinstein Company	Teenage Mutant Ninja Turtles
2009	Turtles Forever	Mirage Studios/4kids Entertainment	Teenage Mutant Ninja Turtles
2016	Half-Shell Heroes: Blast to the Past	Mirage Studios/Nickelodeon/Paramount Home Entertainment	Teenage Mutant Ninja Turtles
2016	Turtles in Time		Teenage Mutant Ninja Turtles
2017	Teenage Mecha Ninja Turtles		Teenage Mutant Ninja Turtles
2017	Raphael: Mutant Apocalypse		Teenage Mutant Ninja Turtles
2017	DuckTales: Woo-oo!	Dell Comics / Disney Television Animation	Uncle Scrooge
2021	Rumble	Paramount Animation/WWE Studios/Walden Media/Reel FX Animation Studios/Paramount+	Top Shelf Productions
2022	Rise of the Teenage Mutant Ninja Turtles: The Movie	Netflix/Nickelodeon Movies/Nickelodeon Animation Studios	Teenage Mutant Ninja Turtles
2023	Teenage Mutant Ninja Turtles: Mutant Mayhem	Paramount Animation / Nickelodeon Movies / Point Grey Pictures / Paramount Pictures	Teenage Mutant Ninja Turtles
2025	Teenage Mutant Ninja Turtles: Chrome Alone 2 – Lost in New Jersey	Point Grey Pictures / Paramount Pictures	Teenage Mutant Ninja Turtles
Upcoming
2027	Teenage Mutant Ninja Turtles: Mutant Mayhem sequel	Paramount Animation / Nickelodeon Movies / Point Grey Pictures / Paramount Pictures	Teenage Mutant Ninja Turtles

== Reception ==
=== Box office ===
Title	Distributor(s)	Release date (United States)	Budget (millions)	Box office gross			
Title	Distributor(s)	Release date (United States)	Budget (millions)	Opening weekend (North America)	North America	Other territories	Worldwide
30 Days of Night	Warner Bros	October 19, 2007	$30	$15,951,902	$39,569,000	$35,936,977	$75,505,977
Total			$30	$15,951,902	$39,569,000	$35,936,977	$75,505,977

=== Critical and public reception ===
Film	Rotten Tomatoes	Metacritic	CinemaScore
30 Days of Night	51% (158 reviews)	28 (19 reviews)	C
30 Days of Night: Dark Days	7% (6 reviews)	TBA (0 reviews)	TBA
List indicator: A dark grey cell indicates information is not available for the film.

== See also ==
- List of IDW Publishing publications
