= Novella Nelson =

American actress (1939–2017)

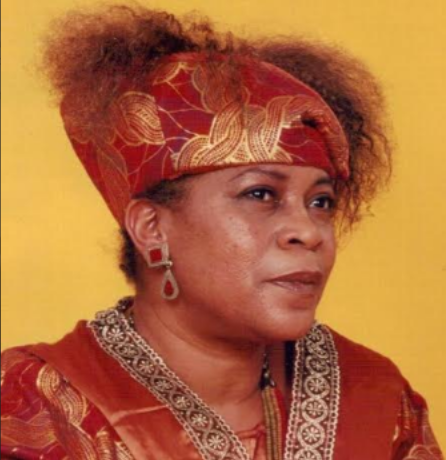
- Born: Novella Christine Nelson; December 17, 1939; New York City, U.S.
- Died: August 31, 2017 (aged 77); New York City, U.S.
- Education: Brooklyn College
- Occupations: Actress; singer
- Years active: 1961–2017

Novella Christine Nelson (December 17, 1939 – August 31, 2017) was an American actress and singer. She established her career as a singer, both on the off-Broadway and Broadway stage and in cabaret-style locales.

== Early life ==
Nelson was born on December 17, 1939, in Brooklyn, New York, to James and Evelyn (formerly Hines) Nelson. Her father was a pastor and a taxi driver. Her mother was an executive assistant at magazine publisher Women's Wear Daily.

An African American, she attended the predominantly white Brooklyn College in the late 1950s, majoring in biochemistry. She took a speech class, which was an acting course, and was asked to perform in a play. For the play she took on the role of Berenice, the housekeeper, in The Member of the Wedding by Carson McCullers. After being on stage in this and other plays, the future actress changed course becoming a theatre major.

== Career ==
Starting in 1961, Nelson had a decades-long stage career, performing, directing and producing, primarily in New York. She was a featured performer on Broadway in 1970 in the musical Purlie. In 1975, Nelson directed the play La Femme Noire at The Public Theater. Her film career began at age 39 with a small part in 1977's An Unmarried Woman, and continued for the next several decades with roles in movies and television.

She may be best known for her role as Mrs. Tate in the 2002 movie Antwone Fisher.

== Death ==
Nelson died of cancer on August 31, 2017, aged 77, in her native Brooklyn, New York.

== Filmography ==
=== Film ===
Year	Title	Role	Notes
1978	An Unmarried Woman	Jean Starret	
1979	The Seduction of Joe Tynan	Carla Willis	
1980	The Torture of Mothers		
1984	The Cotton Club	Madame St. Clair	
1984	The Flamingo Kid	Lizzy	
1987	Orphans	Mattie	
1990	Privilege	Yvonne Washington	
1990	The Bonfire of the Vanities	Media Jackal	
1990	Green Card	Marriage Celebrant	
1991	Strictly Business	Olivia	
1993	Weekend at Bernie's II	Mobu	
1994	Dead Funny	Frances	
1995	The Keeper	Mrs. Lemont	
1995	Mercy	Angela	
1996	Manny & Lo	Georgine	
1996	Girl 6	Angela's Aunt	
1997	White Lies	Leon's Mother	
1997	The Devil's Advocate	Botanica Woman	
1998	1999	Rufus' Shrink	
1998	A Perfect Murder	Ambassador Alice Wills	
1999	Judy Berlin	Carol	
2001	The Gilded Six Bits	Mama Banks	Short
2002	Antwone Fisher	Mrs. Tate	
2003	Head of State	Moderator	
2003	Conversations with Id	Aunt Mae	Short
2004	Birth	Lee	
2004	Dear Wendy	Clarabelle	
2005	Preaching to the Choir	Aunt June	
2006	Stephanie Daley	Dr. Peterson	
2006	Premium	Jayme	
2006	Griffin & Phoenix	Maya Restaurant Owner	
2007	The Ten	Judge Sophia R. Jackson	
2007	August Rush	Social Services Office Attendant	Uncredited
2008	The Toe Tactic	Victoria Hadaway	
2008	Compliments of the Serpent	Barbara Stanton	Video short
2010	It's Kind of a Funny Story	The Professor	
2011	The Inheritance	Aunt Bee	
2011	Somebody's Hero	Maureen	
2012	Nancy, Please	Dr. Bannister	
2012	Bama & Fred	Bama	Short
2014	A Walk Among the Tombstones	Librarian	
2015	Sweet Kandy	Bernice Boyd	
2017	Collar	Fiona Taylor	
2017	You Were Never Really Here	Diner Woman	
2017	Spell	Safi	

=== Television ===
Year	Title	Role	Notes
1978	Watch Your Mouth	Mrs. King	"Chicago Red and Mugger – Part 2"
1983	Chiefs	Nellie Cole	TV miniseries
1984	A Doctor's Story	Mrs. Thornton	TV film
1984	He's Fired, She's Hired	Serena Cole	TV film
1986	The Equalizer	Miriam Blain	Episode: "The Line"
1987	Kojak: The Price of Justice	Pearl	TV film
1988	Hothouse	Olivia	"The Subject of Sex"
1989	A Man Called Hawk	Mrs. Webster	"Never My Love"
1989	The Littlest Victims	Mrs. Munson	TV film
1989	As the World Turns	Sarah Franklin	"1.8637"
1990	Law & Order	Judge Gloria Crutcher	"Out of the Half-Light"
1992	Citizen Cohn	Second Annie Lee Moss	TV film
1993	Daybreak	Mrs. Chaney	TV film
1993-2004	One Life to Live	Judge Barbara Fitzwater	various episodes
1995	New York News	Evelyn Gates	"New York News"
1995	Law & Order	Mrs. Washington	"Humiliation"
1995	New York Undercover	Prof. Cortez	"Old Tyme Religion"
1996	Harambee!	Queenesther	TV film
1996	The Summer of Ben Tyler	Rosetta Tyler	TV film
1997	Oz	Loretta Smith	"Plan B"
1997	Dellaventura	Aretha Jefferson	"Music of the Night"
1998	Mama Flora's Family	Pearl (1955–1970)	TV miniseries
1998	Sex and the City	Madame Lordes	"Oh Come All Ye Faithful"
1999	Law & Order: Special Victims Unit	Mrs. Mosley	"Sophomore Jinx"
2001	100 Centre Street	Isabelle	"Things Change"
2003	Third Watch	Sondra Richards	"In Confidence"
2004	The West Wing	Gail Fitzwallace	"Gaza", "NSF Thurmont"
2007	The Starter Wife	Nana Vera	TV miniseries
2008	Army Wives	Vivian Burton	"Thank You for Letting Me Share", "Transitions"
2010	30 Rock	Novella Nelson	"The Moms"

== Discography ==
Novella Nelson (album)

- Released: 1970
- Format: LP
- Label: Arcana
- Singles: "Mean World", "Long Road Home", "(Sittin' On) The Dock of the Bay", "Lilac Wine", "Johnny (Guns and Drums)", "I'm Troubled", "Do What You Gotta Do", "Cold Water Flat", "Porgy", and "I Wish I Knew How It Would Feel To Be Free"

Walk Him Up The Stairs-Prologue / Down Home (Purlie promo w. Linda Hopkins & Cleavon Little)

- Released: 1970
- Format: LP
- Label: Ampex

Where Do You Go / The Bar (single w. Gordy Rose)

- Released: 1971
- Format: LP
- Label: Stock Bridge
