= Kahil Dotay =

American actor

- Occupations: Actor, director, producer, locations manager
- Years active: 2004–present

Kahil Dotay is an American business manager, producer, locations manager, director, actor and stunt driver.

Dotay graduated with honors from the University of Florida attaining a B.S. B.A. He runs several businesses but is mostly known publicly for his career in show business. He was first widely known for his role as young Richard Dreyfuss in the film Courage & Stupidity. Dotay has appeared in more than sixty-five film productions. He was nominated for his performance in the movie Sarah and won best actor for his performance in the movie Full Spectrum. He co-starred as a detective in the HBO original series, The Wire, during its third season and played the character Adam in the HBO original series, Washingtonienne.

Mr. Dotay is currently running a robotics company, "Mr Robot" as well as producing films for the company INTEGfilms™, and others.

He also has ongoing employment as an independent location manager and stunt driver in Virginia and Washington, DC.

In 2007, his script, "Frank & Flo" won first place in the "LA Shorts Fest". Despite the story taking place in Las Vegas, the resulting film was shot around Midlothian, VA and Richmond, VA in mid-2009.

In 2011, he played Elmer Irey in the major motion picture J. Edgar, directed by Clint Eastwood. In 2013, he played Neco in the award-winning suspense/horror film titled, "Neco's Basement". In January 2015, he wrapped production on the feature film entitled, "Vampires in Virginia". In that same year he participated in several projects, including "Putting up with it", which was popular in film festivals. In 2016, he wrapped production on the feature entitled, "Sure Thing" where he worked on both sides of the camera. In 2017 he served as location manager and locations scout for the film, "Burning Sands". In 2018, he served as locations manager and line producer for several commercials and films. In 2019, he co-starred in the feature film entitled, "Dirty Money" and also served as their locations manager. In early 2020, he co-starred in a film entitled, "Dead Birds" that wrapped just before the Covid-19 pandemic struck the USA. In 2022, he directed the pilot episode, "Mr. Evans" for the TV show "GOTCHA". In 2023, he was an executive producer on the feature film, "The Kill Room" starring Uma Thurman, Joe Manganiello, and Samuel L. Jackson.

He is currently in preproduction on two documentaries, and one pilot.
