= Darin Beckstead =

American filmmaker

- Born: Darin Beckstead; United States
- Occupation: Film director
- Known for: Courage & Stupidity; Somebody's Hero
- Website: www.darinbeckstead.com

Darin Beckstead is an American filmmaker who has directed films, including Courage & Stupidity and Somebody's Hero.

== Career ==
In 2005, his debut film, Courage & Stupidity, was released. The work reimagines Steven Spielberg's experiences making Jaws. It screened at Fantasia, the Sitges Film Festival, and was distributed by Netflix.

In 2012, Beckstead directed Somebody's Hero. The film played at the Heartland Film Festival, Newport Beach Film Festival, and received the "Best Feature" award at the Coney Island Film Festival.

== Filmography ==
- Courage & Stupidity (2005)
- Somebody's Hero (2012)
- Galactic Heat (2015)
- Evil Nature (2018)

== Awards and recognition ==
- 2005: Fantasia Film Festival Award for Courage & Stupidity
- 2005: Sitges Film Festival Award for Courage & Stupidity
- 2011: Coney Island Film Festival Award for Somebody's Hero
