= Surge of Power: Revenge of the Sequel =

- Directed by: Antonio Lexerot; Vincent J. Roth
- Written by: Vincent J. Roth
- Produced by: Surge of Power Enterprises
- Starring: Vincent J. Roth; Eric Roberts; Nichelle Nichols; Linda Blair; Gil Gerard
- Cinematography: Mario DeAngelis
- Edited by: Ernest P. Eich IV
- Music by: Ken Fix
- Production company: Surge of Power Enterprises
- Release date: 2016
- Running time: 88 minutes
- Country: United States
- Language: English

Surge of Power: Revenge of the Sequel is a 2016 American independent superhero comedy film directed by Antonio Lexerot and Vincent J. Roth, who also stars as the lead character. It is the second film in the Surge of Power series, produced by Surge of Power Enterprises, and follows the 2004 movie Surge of Power: The Stuff of Heroes. The film follows superhero Surge as he faces new and returning enemies.

== Plot ==
Surge of Power: Revenge of the Sequel follows Gavin Lucas/Surge, an openly gay superhero, as he confronts two threats: his old enemy Metal Master, recently paroled from prison, and a new psychic villain named Augur. Augur seeks revenge against retired superhero Omen, his former mentor, by harnessing the power of Celinedionium hidden beneath a Las Vegas casino. Assisted by his allies, Surge tracks Augur to Hoover Dam, where a battle temporarily stops the villain's plan. However, Augur escapes and revives "The Council", a dormant group of supervillains from Omen's past, forcing her out of retirement. In the climax, Surge convinces Metal Master to betray Augur, while Omen confronts her former protégé. Though the heroes prevent Augur's scheme, the film ends with hints that The Council remains a threat.

== Cast ==
- Vincent J. Roth as Gavin Lucas / Surge
- John T. Venturini as Hector Harris / Metal Master
- Eric Roberts as Augur
- Sean Rogers as Todd
- Mariann Gavelo as Wendy
- Michael Murray as Marvin
- Nichelle Nichols as Omen
- Robert Picardo as Omen (Male Form)
- Linda Blair as Helen Harris
- Gil Gerard as Harold Harris

== Production and release ==
The film was produced independently with a limited budget and filmed on location in Los Angeles, Las Vegas, and at Hoover Dam. It included several cameos from sci-fi and pop culture figures, including Bruce Vilanch, Shannon Farnon, Frank Marino, Larry Thomas, Noel Neill, Jack Larson, Michael Gray, John Haymes Newton, Lou Ferrigno, Jay Underwood, Alex Hyde-White, Carl Ciarfalio, Joseph Culp, Walter Koenig, Richard Hatch, Marina Sirtis, Paul McGann, Nicholas Brendon, Manu Bennett, Eddie Mekka, Dawn Wells, Rebecca Staab, Kathy Garver, Sean Kenney, Francine York, Kato Kaelin, Murray Langston, Ken Davitian, Oscar Goodman and Linda Blair.

Revenge of the Sequel had a limited theatrical release in January 2018 and is available on DVD, Blu-Ray and for streaming on some platforms.

== Reception and criticism ==
The film received mixed reviews. Frank Scheck of The Hollywood Reporter described it as “gleefully campy” but lamented its “public-access television - level effects”. Kimber Myers of the Los Angeles Times criticized both its script and technical execution. Roger Moore of Movie Nation faulted its reliance on cameos at the expense of coherent storytelling, calling it “a played-out idea excruciatingly executed”. Conversely, Jennie Kermode of Eye for Film called it "a joyous low budget romp", and David-Elijah Nahmod of the Bay Area Reporter deemed it "loads of fun".

Some LGBTQ+ reviewers lauded the inclusion of an openly gay superhero as a genre milestone. The film also won several awards, including Best Villain (Eric Roberts) and Best Special Effects at the 2017 Action On Film Festival, Best Comedy at the 2017 Nevada International Film Festival, and Most Inspirational Lead Character at La Palma Rosa.
