= Somebody's Hero (film) =

- Film poster
- Directed by: Darin Beckstead
- Screenplay by: Darin Beckstead
- Produced by: Guillermo Suescum; Robyn Bennett
- Starring: Christopher Gorham; Susan Misner; Ben Hyland; Arthur Nascarella; Novella Nelson
- Cinematography: Christopher Walters
- Edited by: Ray Chung
- Music by: Denny Schneidemesser
- Distributed by: Amazon Studios
- Release date: June 17, 2012 (United States)
- Running time: 81 minutes
- Country: United States
- Language: English

Somebody's Hero is a 2012 American family feature film written and directed by Darin Beckstead, starring Christopher Gorham, Susan Misner, and Arthur Nascarella.

== Plot ==
An ordinary accountant, Dennis Sullivan, secretly plays superhero while falling for his widowed client; Katie Wells and her hero-obsessed son.

== Cast ==
- Christopher Gorham as Dennis Sullivan
- Susan Misner as Katie Wells
- Ben Hyland as Jake Wells
- Novella Nelson as Maureen
- Arthur Nascarella as Donald Delansky
- Pamela Shaw as Miss Malechek

== Production ==
Somebody's Hero was filmed and set in New York City. The film was written and directed by Darin Beckstead.

== Reception ==
The film was screened at the 2011 Coney Island Film Festival, where it later won the Award for the "Best Feature". It was further recognized by the Waterfront Film Festival, the Heartland Film Festival, and Newport Beach Film Festival.

A review at Criterion Cast stated, "Overall, Somebody’s Hero is a flawed crowd pleaser that, if you allow yourself to get sucked into the romance and ‘you must stand up, if not for yourself, but for others’ message, you’ll be hard pressed to not be charmed by this warm and loving comedy. Featuring a handful of great performances, it may not be the most rewarding watch ever, but I’ll be damned if this one doesn’t win you over by the time the credits roll."
