= Detroit Mirror =

Former Detroit-area tabloid newspaper

- Type: Tabloid
- Owner: Bernarr MacFadden
- Ceased publication: August 1932
- Language: English
- Headquarters: Detroit, Michigan
- City: Detroit
- Country: United States

The Detroit Mirror was a daily morning tabloid newspaper published in Detroit, Michigan.

It ceased publication in August 1932 without warning, only giving a week of severance pay to its employees. At that time it had a circulation of 170,000. But it had lost two million dollars in sixteen months despite having made huge gains in both circulation and advertising revenue during the spring of 1932.

It was owned by publishers Robert R. McCormick and Joseph Medill Patterson, also owners of the Chicago Tribune and New York Daily News. They had taken it over in 1931 from Bernarr MacFadden as a partial payment for Liberty magazine that was taken over by MacFadden. Max Annenberg was the Detroit Mirror's local publisher and his son Ivan was circulation manager.

Some other notable employees were Bert Whitman, a cartoonist from 1929 to 1932 and Zeke Zekley who began working as an editorial and comic cartoonist there at age 18.

Chester Gould's long-running comic strip Dick Tracy made its first-ever appearance in the Detroit Mirror on Sunday October 4, 1931.
