= Surge of Power: The Stuff of Heroes =

- Directed by: Mike Donahue
- Written by: Vincent J. Roth
- Produced by: Vincent J. Roth
- Starring: Vincent J. Roth; John T. Venturini; Joey Bourgeois; Robert Hurt
- Cinematography: Matt McFarland; Greg Kimble
- Edited by: Peter Gahan
- Music by: Ken Fix
- Production company: Surge of Power Enterprises LLC
- Distributed by: Ariztical Entertainment
- Release date: 2004
- Running time: 98 minutes
- Country: United States
- Language: English

Surge of Power: The Stuff of Heroes is a 2004 American independent superhero comedy film directed by Mike Donahue and written by Vincent J. Roth. The film is known for featuring cinema's first openly gay superhero.

It premiered at festivals in 2004, received a limited theatrical release in 2006 and is available on DVD and for streaming on some platforms. The film launched the Surge of Power franchise and was followed by the sequel Surge of Power: Revenge of the Sequel (2018).

== Plot ==
Gavin Lucas, a corporate attorney and comic book fan, gains superhuman abilities after a sabotaged laboratory experiment involving scientist Ronald Richards and Richards’ former partner Hector Harris. With Richards’ reluctant assistance, Gavin designs a battle suit and becomes the superhero Surge of Power, defending Big City. Harris, transformed by the same accident, develops the ability to control metal and becomes the villain Metal Master. Their conflict escalates into a series of confrontations that culminate in a final showdown.

== Cast ==
=== Main roles ===
- Vincent J. Roth as Gavin Lucas / Surge
- John T. Venturini as Hector Harris / Metal Master
- Joey Bourgeois as the Young Man
- Robert Hurt as Ronald Richards

=== Cameos ===
- Noel Neill – bank robbery bystander
- Lou Ferrigno – passerby
- Nichelle Nichols – retired superhero Omen
- Len Wein and Marv Wolfman – comic book writers
- Forrest J. Ackerman, Alison Arngrim, Trev Broudy, Bernard Fox, Marty Krofft, Lisa Loring, Rose Marie, Erin Murphy, Butch Patrick, Liz Sheridan, Bobby Trendy.

== Background, production and release ==
The project was developed by Vincent J. Roth, a California attorney and comic book fan, who conceived the idea of combining a superhero narrative with a gay lead character. Roth also wrote the script, served as executive producer, and starred as Gavin Lucas. The film was directed by Mike Donahue and produced by Ray Quiroga and Tom Tangen alongside Roth.

Filming took place primarily in California with cinematography by Matt McFarland. The film was edited by Peter Gahan, with music composed by Ken Fix. Production used digital effects typical of low-budget films of the early 2000s, and relied on community support, volunteer contributions, and rented sets.

The film also features cameo appearances by notable figures from science fiction and comic book media, which reviewers observed as a way of connecting the production to established fan culture.

Surge of Power: The Stuff of Heroes premiered at film festivals in 2004 and received a limited theatrical release in March 2006. A DVD release followed in May 2006, with later streaming availability including Netflix between 2009 and 2013.

== Reception and criticism ==
The film received a mixed critical response. Reviewers criticized its limited budget, simplified special effects, and performance that was below industry standard. In a 2018 review of the sequel, The Hollywood Reporter referred to Surge of Power: The Stuff of Heroes as “a film that virtually no one has heard of,” noting its limited recognition outside niche audiences. On the other hand, some acknowledged its cultural significance as one of the earliest films to present an openly gay superhero.

== Sequel ==
Surge of Power: Revenge of the Sequel
