= List of films based on English-language comics =

This is a list of films based on English-language comics, including comic books, graphic novels, and features in anthology comics magazines. It includes films that are adaptations of English-language comics, and those films whose characters originated in comic books (e.g. Batman is not an adaptation of one particular comic book, but the character first appeared in comic books, not in another medium). It also includes film serials. It does not include material where the original source is newspaper comic strips, which is featured on a separate list. All films categorized by character listed chronologically.

== 0–9 ==
- 2 Guns (2013) (Boom! Studios)
- 30 Days of Night (IDW Publishing):
  - 30 Days of Night (2007)
  - 30 Days of Night: Dark Days (2010, direct-to-video film)
- 300 (Dark Horse Comics):
  - 300 (2007)
  - 300: Rise of an Empire (2014)

== A ==
- Abattoir (2016) (Radical Comics)
- Adam Strange (2020, animated short film) (DC Comics)
- Agent Carter (2013, direct-to-video short film) (Marvel Comics)
- Alien vs. Predator (based on previous Alien and Predator films and the Dark Horse Comics of the same name):
  - Alien vs. Predator (2004)
  - Aliens vs. Predator: Requiem (2007)
- Afterburn (2025) (Red 5 Comics)
- The Amazing Screw-On Head (2006, animated pilot) (Dark Horse Comics)
- American Splendor (2003) (Dark Horse Comics)
- American Terror (2013, animated short film) (Alterna Comics)
- Ant-Man (Marvel Comics):
  - Ant-Man (2015)
  - Ant-Man and the Wasp (2018)
  - Ant-Man and the Wasp: Quantumania (2023)
- Aquaman (DC Comics)
  - Aquaman (2006, failed TV pilot)
  - Lego DC Comics Super Heroes: Aquaman – Rage of Atlantis (2018, direct-to-video LEGO film)
  - Aquaman (2018)
  - Aquaman and the Lost Kingdom (2023)
- Archie Comics:
  - Archie: To Riverdale and Back Again (1990, TV movie)
  - The Archies in Jugman (2002, animated TV movie)
  - The Archies (2023)
- Art School Confidential (2006) (Fantagraphics)
- Avengers (Marvel Comics):
  - Ultimate Avengers (2006, animated direct-to-video film)
  - Ultimate Avengers 2: Rise of the Panther (2006, animated direct-to-video film)
  - Next Avengers: Heroes of Tomorrow (2008, animated direct-to-video film)
  - The Avengers (2012)
  - Item 47 (2012, direct-to-video short film)
  - Lego Marvel Super Heroes: Maximum Overload (2013, animated web film)
  - Avengers Confidential: Black Widow & Punisher (2014, animated direct-to-video film)
  - Avengers: Age of Ultron (2015)
  - Lego Marvel Super Heroes: Avengers Reassembled (2015, animated TV movie)
  - Marvel Super Hero Adventures: Frost Fight! (2015, animated TV special)
  - Avengers: Infinity War (2018)
  - Avengers: Endgame (2019)
  - Avengers: Doomsday (2026)

== B ==
- The B.P.R.D. Declassified (2004, TV special) (Dark Horse Comics)
- The Bad Guys (Scholastic Corporation)
  - The Bad Guys (2022)
  - The Bad Guys: A Very Bad Holiday (2023, TV special)
  - The Bad Guys: Haunted Heist (2024, TV special)
  - The Bad Guys 2 (2025)
- Bad Kids (Antarctic Press)
  - Bad Kids Go to Hell (2012)
  - Bad Kids of Crestview Academy (2017)
- Barb Wire (1996) (Dark Horse Comics)
- Batman (DC Comics):
  - Batman (1943, serial)
  - Batman and Robin (1949, serial)
  - Batman (1966)
  - Batman (1989)
  - Batman Returns (1992)
  - Batman: Mask of the Phantasm (1993, animated film)
  - Batman Forever (1995)
  - Batman & Robin (1997)
  - Batman & Mr. Freeze: SubZero (1998, animated direct-to-video)
  - Batman Beyond: The Movie (1999, animated direct-to-video)
  - Batman Beyond: Return of the Joker (2000, animated direct-to-video)
  - Chase Me (2003, animated short film)
  - Batman: Mystery of the Batwoman (2003, animated direct-to-video)
  - Batman Begins (2005)
  - The Batman vs. Dracula (2005, animated direct-to-video)
  - The Dark Knight (2008)
  - Batman: Gotham Knight (2008, animated direct-to-video)
  - Superman/Batman: Public Enemies (2009, animated direct-to-video)
  - Batman: Under the Red Hood (2010, animated direct-to-video)
  - Superman/Batman: Apocalypse (2010, animated direct-to-video)
  - Batman: Year One (2011, animated direct-to-video)
  - The Dark Knight Returns - Part 1 (2012, animated direct-to-video)
  - The Dark Knight Rises (2012)
  - The Dark Knight Returns - Part 2 (2013, animated direct-to-video)
  - Lego Batman: The Movie – DC Super Heroes Unite (2013, animated direct-to-video)
  - Son of Batman (2014, animated direct-to-video)
  - Batman: Assault on Arkham (2014, animated direct-to-video)
  - Lego DC Comics: Batman Be-Leaguered (2014, animated TV special)
  - Batman vs. Robin (2015, animated direct-to-video)
  - Batman Unlimited: Animal Instincts, (2015, animated direct-to-video)
  - Batman Unlimited: Monster Mayhem (2015, animated direct-to-video)
  - Batman: Bad Blood (2016, animated direct-to-video)
  - Batman v Superman: Dawn of Justice (2016)
  - Batman: The Killing Joke (2016, animated direct-to-video)
  - Batman Unlimited: Mechs vs. Mutants (2016, animated direct-to-video)
  - Batman: Return of the Caped Crusaders (2016, animated direct-to-video)
  - The Lego Batman Movie (2017, animated spin-off of The Lego Movie)
  - Batman and Harley Quinn (2017, animated direct-to-video)
  - Batman vs. Two-Face (2017, animated direct-to-video)
  - Scooby-Doo! & Batman: The Brave and the Bold (2018, animated direct-to-video)
  - Batman: Gotham by Gaslight (2018, animated direct-to-video)
  - Batman Ninja (2018, animated direct-to-video)
  - Batman vs. Teenage Mutant Ninja Turtles (2019, animated direct-to-video)
  - Batman: Hush (2019, animated direct-to-video)
  - Batman: Death in the Family (2020, animated short film)
  - Batman: Soul of the Dragon (2021, animated direct-to-video)
  - Batman: The Long Halloween, Part One (2021, animated direct-to-video)
  - Batman: The Long Halloween, Part Two (2021, animated direct-to-video)
  - The Batman (2022)
  - Batman and Superman: Battle of the Super Sons (2022, animated direct-to-video)
  - Batman: The Doom That Came to Gotham (2023, animated direct-to-video)
  - Aztec Batman: Clash of Empires (2025, animated direct-to-video)
- Big Hero 6 (2014, animated film) (Marvel Comics)
- Birds of Prey (2020) (DC Comics)
- Black Adam (2022) (DC Comics)
- Rise of the Black Bat (2012, direct-to-video film) (DC Comics)
- Black Panther (Marvel Comics):
  - Black Panther (2018)
  - Lego Marvel Super Heroes: Black Panther – Trouble in Wakanda (2018, direct-to-video Lego film)
  - Black Panther: Wakanda Forever (2022)
- Blackhawk (1952, serial) (DC Comics)
- Black Widow (2021) (Marvel Comics)
- Blade (Marvel Comics):
  - Blade (1998)
  - Blade II (2002)
  - Blade: Trinity (2004)
  - Blade: House of Chthon (2007, direct-to-video film)
- Bloodshot (2020) (Valiant Comics)
- Blue Beetle (2023) (DC Comics)
- The Bogie Man (1992, TV movie) (Fat Man Press)
- Bounty Killer (2013) (Kickstart Comics)
- Bulletproof Monk (2003) (Image Comics)

== C ==
- Captain America (Marvel Comics):
  - Captain America (1944, serial)
  - Captain America (1979, TV movie)
  - Captain America II: Death Too Soon (1979, TV movie)
  - Captain America (1990)
  - Captain America: The First Avenger (2011)
  - Captain America: The Winter Soldier (2014)
  - Iron Man & Captain America: Heroes United (2014, animated direct-to-video film)
  - Captain America: Civil War (2016)
  - Captain America: Brave New World (2025)
- Captain Battle: Legacy War (2013) (Image Comics)
- Captain Marvel (DC Comics) (DC Comics)
  - Adventures of Captain Marvel (1941, serial)
  - Superman/Shazam!: The Return of Black Adam (2010, animated short film)
  - Shazam! (2019)
  - Lego DC Shazam! Magic and Monsters (2020, animated direct-to-video film)
  - Shazam! Fury of the Gods (2023)
- Captain Marvel (Marvel Comics) (Marvel Comics)
  - Captain Marvel (2019)
  - The Marvels (2023)
- Catwoman (DC Comics)
  - Catwoman (2004)
  - Catwoman (2011, animated short film)
  - Catwoman: Hunted (2022, animated direct-to-video film)
- Cet été-là (2022) (First Second)
- Chickenhare (Dark Horse Comics)
  - Chickenhare and the Hamster of Darkness (2022, animated film)
  - Chickenhare and the Secret of the Groundhog (2025, animated film)
- Clayface (2026) (DC Comics)
- The Clockwork Girl (2014, animated film) (Arcana Studio)
- The Coldest City (Oni Press)
  - Atomic Blonde (2017)
- Congo Bill (1948, serial) (DC Comics)
- Constantine (DC Comics/Vertigo)
  - Constantine (2005)
  - Constantine: City of Demons (2018, animated direct-to-video film)
  - Constantine: The House of Mystery (2022, animated short film)
- The Consultant (2011, direct-to-video short film) (Marvel Comics)
- Corrective Measures (2022) (Arcana Comics)
- Cowboys & Aliens (2011) (Platinum Studios)
- The Crow (Caliber Comics)
  - The Crow (1994)
  - The Crow: City of Angels (1996)
  - The Crow: Salvation (2000)
  - The Crow: Wicked Prayer (2005)
  - The Crow (2024)

== D ==
- Daredevil (2003) (Marvel Comics)
- DC League of Super-Pets (2022, animated film) (DC Comics)
- DC Super Hero Girls (2016) (DC Comics):
  - DC Super Hero Girls: Super Hero High (2016, animated TV movie)
  - DC Super Hero Girls: Hero of the Year (2016, animated direct-to-video film)
  - DC Super Hero Girls: Intergalactic Games (2017, animated direct-to-video film)
  - Lego DC Super Hero Girls: Brain Drain (2017, animated direct-to-video film)
  - Lego DC Super Hero Girls: Super-Villain High (2018, animated direct-to-video film)
  - DC Super Hero Girls: Legends of Atlantis (2018, animated direct-to-video film)
- DC Super Hero Girls (2019) (DC Comics)
  - #TheLateBatsby (2018, animated short film)
  - DC Super Hero Girls: Sweet Justice (2019, animated TV movie)
- Deadpool (Marvel Comics)
  - Deadpool (2016)
  - Deadpool: No Good Deed (2017, short film)
  - Deadpool 2 (2018)
    - Once Upon a Deadpool (2018, PG-13 cut of Deadpool 2)
  - Deadpool and Korg React (2021, short film)
  - Deadpool & Wolverine (2024)
- Death (2019, animated short film) (DC Comics)
- Deathstroke: Knights & Dragons: The Movie (2020, animated direct-to-video film) (DC Comics)
- The Diary of a Teenage Girl (2015) (Frog Books)
- Doctor Strange (Marvel Comics)
  - Dr. Strange (1978, TV movie)
  - Doctor Strange: The Sorcerer Supreme (2007, animated direct-to-video film)
  - Doctor Strange (2016)
  - Doctor Strange in the Multiverse of Madness (2022)
- Dracula: Sovereign of The Damned (1980, anime TV movie) (Marvel Comics)

== E ==
- Elektra (2005) (Marvel Comics)
- The Empty Man (2020) (Boom! Studios)
- Eternals (2021) (Marvel Comics)
- Ethel & Ernest (2016, animated film) (Jonathan Cape)
- Extraction (Oni Press)
  - Extraction (2020)
  - Extraction 2 (2023)

== F ==
- Fantastic Four (Marvel Comics)
  - The Fantastic Four (1994, unreleased)
  - Fantastic Four (2005)
  - Fantastic Four: Rise of the Silver Surfer (2007)
  - Fantastic Four (2015)
  - The Fantastic Four: First Steps (2025)
- Faust: Love Of The Damned (2000) (Avatar Press)
- Firearm (1993, direct-to-video short film) (Malibu Comics)
- Firebreather (2010, animated TV movie) (Image Comics)
- The Flash (DC Comics):
  - The Flash (1990, TV movie)
  - The Flash II: Revenge of the Trickster (1991, TV movie)
  - The Flash III: Deadly Nightshade (1992, TV movie)
  - Lego DC Comics Super Heroes: The Flash (2018, animated direct-to-video film)
  - The Flash (2023)
- Freedom Fighters: The Ray (2018, animated direct-to-video film) (DC Comics)
- From Hell (2001) (Top Shelf Productions)

== G ==
- G-Men from Hell (2000) (Dark Horse Comics)
- Gen^{13} (2000, animated film) (WildStorm)
- Generation X (1996, TV movie) (Marvel Comics)
- Ghost Rider (Marvel Comics):
  - Ghost Rider (2007)
  - Ghost Rider: Spirit of Vengeance (2012)
- Ghost World (2001) (Fantagraphics)
- Global Frequency (2005, unaired pilot) (WildStorm)
- Green Arrow (DC Comics):
  - Green Arrow (2010, animated short film)
- Green Lantern (DC Comics):
  - Green Lantern: First Flight (2009, animated direct-to-video film)
  - Green Lantern (2011)
  - Green Lantern: Emerald Knights (2011, animated direct-to-video film)
  - Green Lantern: Beware My Power (2022, animated direct-to-video film)
- Guardians of the Galaxy (Marvel Comics):
  - Guardians of the Galaxy (2014)
  - Lego Marvel Super Heroes - Guardians of the Galaxy: The Thanos Threat (2017, animated Lego TV movie)
  - Guardians of the Galaxy Vol. 2 (2017)
  - Guardians of the Galaxy Vol. 3 (2023)

== H ==
- Hardware (1990, unauthorized by Fleetway Publications)
- The Haunted World of El Superbeasto (2009, animated film) (Image Comics)
- Heavy Metal (HM Communication):
  - Heavy Metal (1981, animated film)
  - Heavy Metal 2000 (2000, animated film)
- Hellboy (Dark Horse Comics):
  - Hellboy (2004)
  - Hellboy: Sword of Storms (2006, animated TV movie)
  - Hellboy: Blood and Iron (2007, animated TV movie)
  - Hellboy II: The Golden Army (2008)
  - Hellboy (2019)
  - Hellboy: The Crooked Man (2024)
- Hercules (2014) (Radical Studios)
- Here (2024) (Pantheon Books)
- Hilda and the Mountain King (2021, animated film) (Nobrow Press)
- A History of Violence (2005) (Paradox Press)
- Hop Harrigan (1946, serial) (DC Comics)
- Howard the Duck (1986) (Marvel Comics)
- Howard Lovecraft (Arcana Comics):
  - Howard Lovecraft and the Frozen Kingdom (2016, animated direct-to-video film)
  - Howard Lovecraft and the Undersea Kingdom (2017, animated direct-to-video film)
  - Howard Lovecraft and the Kingdom of Madness (2018, animated direct-to-video film)
- Hulk (Marvel Comics):
  - The Incredible Hulk (1977, TV movie)
  - Return of the Incredible Hulk (1977, TV movie)
  - The Incredible Hulk: Married (1978, TV movie)
  - The Incredible Hulk Returns (1988, TV movie)
  - The Trial of the Incredible Hulk (1989, TV movie)
  - The Death of the Incredible Hulk (1990, TV movie)
  - Hulk (2003)
  - The Incredible Hulk (2008)
  - Hulk Versus (2008, animated direct-to-video film)
  - Planet Hulk (2010, animated direct-to-video film)
  - Iron Man & Hulk: Heroes United (2013, animated direct-to-video film)
  - Hulk: Where Monsters Dwell (2016, animated direct-to-video film)

== I ==
- I Kill Giants (2017) (Image Comics)
- I, Frankenstein (2014) (Darkstorm Comics)
- Inhumans: The First Chapter (2017) (Marvel Comics)
- Injustice (2021, animated direct-to-video film) (DC Comics)
- Invasion (2016, Arrowverse crossover event TV movie) (DC Comics)
- Iron Man (Marvel Comics)
  - The Invincible Iron Man (2007, animated direct-to-video film)
  - Iron Man (2008)
  - Iron Man 2 (2010)
  - Iron Man 3 (2013)
  - Iron Man: Rise of Technovore (2013, anime direct-to-video film)
  - Iron Man & Hulk: Heroes United (2013, animated direct-to-video film)
  - Iron Man & Captain America: Heroes United (2014, animated direct-to-video film)
  - All Hail the King (2014, direct-to-video short film)

== J ==
- Jiu Jitsu (2020) (Acme Rocket Fuel)
- Joker (DC Comics)
  - Joker (2019)
  - Joker: Folie à Deux (2024)
- Jonah Hex (DC Comics)
  - Jonah Hex (2010)
  - Jonah Hex (2010, animated short film)
- Josie and the Pussycats (2001) (Archie Comics)
- Judge Dredd (Fleetway Publications):
  - Judge Dredd (1995)
  - Dredd (2012)
- Justice League (DC Comics)
  - Legends of the Superheroes (1979, TV specials)
  - Justice League of America (1997, unsuccessful pilot)
  - Justice League: Secret Origins (2001, animated direct-to-video)
  - Justice League: Starcrossed (2004, animated direct-to-video)
  - Justice League: The New Frontier (2008, animated direct-to-video)
  - Justice League: Crisis on Two Earths (2010, animated direct-to-video)
  - Justice League: Doom (2012, animated direct-to-video)
  - Robot Chicken DC Comics Special (2012, animated TV special)
  - Justice League: The Flashpoint Paradox (2013, animated direct-to-video)
  - JLA Adventures: Trapped in Time (2014, animated direct-to-video)
  - Justice League: War (2014, animated direct-to-video)
  - Robot Chicken DC Comics Special 2: Villains in Paradise (2014, animated TV special)
  - Justice League: Throne of Atlantis (2015, animated direct-to-video)
  - Lego DC Comics Super Heroes: Justice League vs. Bizarro League (2015, animated direct-to-video)
  - Justice League: Gods and Monsters (2015, animated direct-to-video)
  - Lego DC Comics Super Heroes: Justice League – Attack of the Legion of Doom (2015, animated direct-to-video)
  - Robot Chicken DC Comics Special III: Magical Friendship (2015, animated TV special)
  - Lego DC Comics Super Heroes: Justice League – Cosmic Clash (2016, animated direct-to-video)
  - Justice League vs. Teen Titans (2016, animated direct-to-video)
  - Lego DC Comics Super Heroes: Justice League – Gotham City Breakout (2016, animated direct-to-video)
  - DC Super Heroes vs. Eagle Talon (2017, animated TV movie)
  - Justice League (2017)
  - Justice League vs. the Fatal Five (2019, animated direct-to-video)
  - Zack Snyder's Justice League (2021)
  - Justice League: Warworld (2023, animated direct-to-video)
  - Justice League: Crisis on Infinite Earths – Part One (2024, animated direct-to-video)
  - Justice League: Crisis on Infinite Earths – Part Two (2024, animated direct-to-video)
  - Justice League: Crisis on Infinite Earths – Part Three (2024, animated direct-to-video)
- Justice League Dark (DC Comics)
  - Justice League Dark (2017, animated direct-to-video)
  - Justice League Dark: Apokolips War (2020, animated direct-to-video)
- Justice Society: World War II (2021, animated direct-to-video) (DC comics)

== K ==
- Kick-Ass (Icon Comics)
  - Kick-Ass (2010)
  - Kick-Ass 2 (2013)
- The Killer (2023) (Boom! Studios)
- Kingsman (Icon Comics)
  - Kingsman: The Secret Service (2015)
  - #TBT to That Time Archer Met Kingsman (2017, animated short, crossover with the non-comic book TV series Archer)
  - Kingsman: The Golden Circle (2017)
  - The King's Man (2021)
  - Argylle (2024)
- The Kitchen (2019) (DC Comics/Vertigo)
- Knights of Justice (2000, TV movie) (Caliber Comics)
- Kraven the Hunter (2024) (Marvel Comics)
- Kyoufu Densetsu Kaiki! Frankenstein (1981, anime TV movie) (Marvel Comics)

== L ==
- Lady Death: The Motion Picture (2004, animated film) (Chaos! Comics)
- The Last Days of American Crime (2020) (Radical Studios)
- The League of Extraordinary Gentlemen (2003) (WildStorm)
- The Lobo Paramilitary Christmas Special (2002, fan film) (DC Comics)
- Locke & Key (2011, TV pilot) (IDW Publishing)
- The Losers (2010) (DC Comics/Vertigo)

== M ==
- M. Rex (Image Comics)
  - Ben 10/Generator Rex: Heroes United (2011, animated TV movie, crossover with the non-comic book franchise Ben 10)
- Madame Web (2024) (Marvel Comics)
- Man-Thing (2005, TV movie) (Marvel Comics):
- Marry Me (2022) (Keenspot)
- Marvel Rising (Marvel Comics):
  - Marvel Rising: Secret Warriors (2018, animated TV movie)
  - Marvel Rising: Chasing Ghosts (2019, animated direct-to-video short film)
  - Marvel Rising: Heart of Iron (2019, animated direct-to-video short film)
  - Marvel Rising: Battle of the Bands (2019, animated direct-to-video short film)
  - Marvel Rising: Operation Shuri (2019, animated direct-to-video short film)
  - Marvel Rising: Playing with Fire (2019, animated direct-to-video short film)
- Marvel Super Heroes 4D (2010, animated short film) (Marvel Comics)
- The Mask (Dark Horse Comics)
  - The Mask (1994)
  - Son of the Mask (2005)
- The Men in Black (Malibu Comics)
  - Men in Black (1997)
  - Men in Black II (2002)
  - Men in Black 3 (2012)
  - Men in Black: International (2019)
- Monkeybone (2001) (Mad Monkey Press)
- Morbius (2022) (Marvel Comics)
- Mosaic (2007, animated direct-to-video film) (POW! Entertainment)
- El Muerto (2007) (Los Comex)
- My Friend Dahmer (2017) (Abrams Books)
- Mystery Men (1999) (Dark Horse Comics)

== N ==
- The New Mutants (2020) (Marvel Comics)
- Nick Fury: Agent of S.H.I.E.L.D. (1998, TV movie) (Marvel Comics)
- Nightveil: Witch War (2005, direct-to-video film) (AC Comics)
- Nightwing and Robin (2015, animated short film) (DC Comics)
- Nimona (2023, animated film) (HarperCollins)

== O ==
- Oblivion (2013) (Radical Studios)
- Officer Downe (2016) (Image Comics)
- The Old Guard (Image Comics)
  - The Old Guard (2020)
  - The Old Guard 2 (2025)

== P ==
- Painkiller Jane (2005, TV movie) (Icon Comics)
- Paradox (2010, TV movie) (Arcana Studio)
- Paying For It (2024) (Drawn & Quarterly)
- The Phantom Stranger (2020, animated short film) (DC Comics)
- Paris, 13th District (2021) (Drawn & Quarterly)
- Pixies (2015, animated film) (Arcana Studio)
- Plastic Man (2006, unaired animated pilot) (DC Comics)
- Polar (2019) (Dark Horse Comics)
- Power Pack (1991, TV pilot) (Marvel Comics)
- Punisher (Marvel Comics)
  - The Punisher (1989)
  - The Punisher (2004)
  - Punisher: War Zone (2008)
  - The Punisher: Dirty Laundry (2012, fan film)
  - Punisher: Do Not Fall in New York City (2012, fan film)
  - Avengers Confidential: Black Widow & Punisher (2014, animated direct-to-video film)

== R ==
- Random Acts of Violence (2019) (Image Comics)
- R.I.P.D. (Dark Horse Comics)
  - R.I.P.D. (2013)
  - R.I.P.D. 2: Rise of the Damned (2022)
- Red (WildStorm)
  - Red (2010)
  - Red 2 (2013)
- Red Sonja (Marvel Comics/Dynamite Entertainment)
  - Red Sonja (1985)
  - Red Sonja: Queen of Plagues (2016, animated direct-to-video film)
  - Red Sonja (2025)
- Remains (2011, TV movie) (IDW Publishing)
- Richie Rich (Harvey Comics)
  - Ri¢hie Ri¢h (1994)
  - Richie Rich's Christmas Wish (1998, direct-to-video film)
- Road to Perdition (2002) (Paradox Press)
- The Rocketeer (1991) (Pacific Comics)
- Rottentail (2019) (Point Press)
- Robot Dreams (2023, animated film) (First Second Books)
- Rumble (2021, animated film) (Top Shelf Productions)

== S ==
- Sabrina the Teenage Witch (Archie Comics)
  - Sabrina the Teenage Witch (1996, TV movie)
  - Sabrina Goes to Rome (1998, TV movie)
  - Sabrina Down Under (1999, TV movie)
  - Sabrina: Friends Forever (2002, animated TV movie)
- The Scarab (Standard Comics):
  - Avenging Force: The Scarab (2012, direct-to-video film)
- Scalped (2017, unaired pilot) (DC Comics/Vertigo)
- Samaritan (2022) (Mythos Comics)
- Scott Pilgrim (Oni Press):
  - Scott Pilgrim vs. the World (2010)
  - Scott Pilgrim vs. The Animation (2010, animated TV special)
- The Scribbler (2014) (Image Comics)
- Sgt. Rock (2019, animated direct-to-video short film) (DC Comics)
- Shang-Chi and the Legend of the Ten Rings (2021) (Marvel Comics)
- Sheena (1984) (Fiction House)
- Shortcomings (2023) (Drawn & Quarterly)
- Shockwave, Darkside (2014) (Keenspot)
- Sin City (Dark Horse Comics):
  - Sin City (2005)
  - Sin City: A Dame to Kill For (2014)
- The Sixth Gun (2013, TV pilot) (Oni Press)
- Solarman (1992, animated pilot) (Marvel Comics)
- Spawn (1997) (Image Comics)
- The Spectre (2010, animated direct-to video short film) (DC Comics)
- Spider-Man (Marvel Comics):
  - Spider-Man (1977, TV movie)
  - Spider-Man Strikes Back (1978, TV movie)
  - Spider-Man (1978, short film)
  - Spider-Man: The Dragon's Challenge (1981, TV movie)
  - Spider-Man (2002)
  - Spider-Man 2 (2004)
  - Spider-Man 3 (2007)
  - The Amazing Spider-Man (2012)
  - The Amazing Spider-Man 2 (2014)
  - Spider-Man: Homecoming (2017, MCU series)
  - Spider-Man: Into the Spider-Verse (2018, animated film)
  - Spider-Ham: Caught in a Ham (2019, animated short film)
  - Spider-Man: Far From Home (2019, MCU series)
  - Peter's To-Do List (2019, direct-to-video short film, MCU series)
  - Spider-Man: No Way Home (2021, MCU series)
  - Spider-Man: Across the Spider-Verse (2023, animated film)
  - Spider-Man: Lotus (2023, fan film)
  - Spider-Man: Brand New Day (2026, MCU series)
- The Spirit: (Eisner & Iger)
  - The Spirit (1987, TV movie)
  - The Spirit (2008)
- SpongeBob (The Intertidal Zone)
  - The SpongeBob SquarePants Movie (2004 animated film)
  - The SpongeBob Movie: Sponge Out of Water (2015 animated film)
  - The SpongeBob Movie: Sponge on the Run (2021 animated film)
  - The SpongeBob Movie: Search for SquarePants (2025 animated film)
- Spy Smasher (1942, serial) (DC Comics)
- Stan Lee's Mighty 7: Beginnings (2014, animated TV movie) (POW! Entertainment)
- Steel (1997) (DC Comics)
- Stitched (2011, short film) (Avatar Film)
- Stitch Head (2025, animated film) (Random House Graphic)
- Suicide Squad (DC Comics):
  - Suicide Squad (2016)
  - Suicide Squad: Hell to Pay (2018, animated direct-to-video film)
  - The Suicide Squad (2021)
- Supergirl (DC Comics):
  - Supergirl (1984)
  - Supergirl (2026)
- Superman (DC Comics):
  - Superman (1948, serial)
  - Atom Man vs. Superman (1950, serial)
  - Superman and the Mole Men (1951)
  - It's a Bird...It's a Plane...It's Superman (1975, TV special)
  - Superman (1978)
  - Superman II (1980)
    - Superman II: The Richard Donner Cut (2006, direct-to-video film)
  - Superman III (1983)
  - Superman IV: The Quest for Peace (1987)
  - Superman: The Last Son of Krypton (1996, animated direct-to-video)
  - The Batman Superman Movie: World's Finest (1999, animated direct-to-video)
  - Superman Returns (2006)
  - Superman: Brainiac Attacks (2006, animated direct-to-video)
  - Superman: Doomsday (2007, animated direct-to-video)
  - Superman/Batman: Public Enemies (2009, animated direct-to-video)
  - Superman/Batman: Apocalypse (2010, animated direct-to-video)
  - Superman/Shazam!: The Return of Black Adam (2010, animated short film)
  - All-Star Superman (2011, animated direct-to-video)
  - Superman vs. The Elite (2012, animated direct-to-video)
  - Superman: Unbound (2013, animated direct-to-video)
  - Man of Steel (2013)
  - Batman v Superman: Dawn of Justice (2016)
  - The Death of Superman (2018, animated direct-to-video)
  - Reign of the Supermen (2019, animated direct-to-video)
  - Superman: Red Son (2020, animated direct-to-video)
  - Superman: Man of Tomorrow (2020, animated direct-to-video)
  - Batman and Superman: Battle of the Super Sons (2022, animated direct-to-video)
  - Superman (2025)
- Surrogates (2009) (Top Shelf Productions)
- Swamp Thing (DC Comics/Vertigo):
  - Swamp Thing (1982)
  - The Return of Swamp Thing (1989)

== T ==
- Tales from the Crypt (EC Comics):
  - Tales from the Crypt (1972)
  - Tales from the Crypt Presents: Demon Knight (1995)
  - Tales from the Crypt Presents: Bordello of Blood (1996)
  - Tales from the Crypt Presents: Ritual (2002)
- Tank Girl (1995) (Deadline)
- Teen Titans (DC Comics):
  - Teen Titans: Trouble in Tokyo (2006, animated TV movie)
  - Justice League vs. Teen Titans (2016, animated direct-to-video film)
  - Teen Titans: The Judas Contract (2017, animated direct-to-video film)
  - Teen Titans Go! To the Movies (2018, animated film)
  - Teen Titans Go! vs. Teen Titans (2019, animated direct-to-video film)
  - Teen Titans Go! See Space Jam (2021, animated TV movie)
  - Teen Titans Go! & DC Super Hero Girls: Mayhem in the Multiverse (2022, animated direct-to-video film)
- Teenage Mutant Ninja Turtles (Mirage Comics):
  - Teenage Mutant Ninja Turtles (1990)
  - Teenage Mutant Ninja Turtles II: The Secret of the Ooze (1991)
  - Teenage Mutant Ninja Turtles III (1993)
  - TMNT (2007, animated film)
  - Turtles Forever (2009, animated TV movie)
  - Teenage Mutant Ninja Turtles (2014)
  - Teenage Mutant Ninja Turtles: Out of the Shadows (2016)
  - Rise of the Teenage Mutant Ninja Turtles: The Movie (2022, animated film)
  - Teenage Mutant Ninja Turtles: Mutant Mayhem (2023, animated film)
- Term Life (2016) (Image Comics)
- Thor (Marvel Comics):
  - Thor (2011)
  - Thor: Tales of Asgard (2011, animated direct-to-video film)
  - A Funny Thing Happened on the Way to Thor's Hammer (2011, direct-to-video short film)
  - Thor: The Dark World (2013)
  - Team Thor (2016, direct-to-video short film)
  - Team Thor: Part 2 (2017, direct-to-video short film)
  - Thor: Ragnarok (2017)
  - Team Darryl (2018, direct-to-video short film)
  - Thor: Love and Thunder (2022)
- Thunderbolts* (2025) (Marvel Comics)
- Timecop (Dark Horse Comics):
  - Timecop (1994)
  - Timecop 2: The Berlin Decision (2003, direct-to-video film)
- Trailer Park of Terror (2008, direct-to-video film) (Imperium Comics)
- Turok: Son of Stone (2008, animated direct-to-video film) (Western Publishing)
- Two-Fisted Tales (1992, TV movie) (EC Comics)

== U ==
- Ultra (2011, TV pilot) (Image Comics)
- Up in Flames (1973, unauthorized by creators) (Rip Off Press)

== V ==
- V for Vendetta (2006) (DC Comics/Vertigo)
- Vampirella (1996, direct-to-video film) (Warren Publishing)
- The Vault of Horror (1973) (EC Comics)
- Venom (Marvel Comics)
  - Venom: Truth in Journalism (2013, short film)
  - Venom (2018)
  - Venom: Let There Be Carnage (2021)
  - Venom: The Last Dance (2024)
- The Vigilante (1947, serial) (DC Comics)
- Virus (1999) (Dark Horse Comics)
- Vixen: The Movie (2017, animated direct-to-video film) (DC Comics)

== W ==
- The Walking Dead (Image Comics):
  - The Robot Chicken Walking Dead Special: Look Who's Walking (2017, stop-motion TV special)
- Wanted (2008) (Top Cow Productions)
- Watchmen (DC comics):
  - Watchmen (2009)
    - Watchmen: The Director's Cut (2009)
    - Watchmen: The Ultimate Cut (2009)
  - Tales of the Black Freighter (2009, animated direct-to-video film)
  - Watchmen Chapter I (2024, animated direct-to-video film)
  - Watchmen Chapter II (2024, animated direct-to-video film)
- Weird Science (1985) (EC Comics)
- Welcome to Eltingville (2002, animated pilot)
- When the Wind Blows (1986, animated film) (Hamish Hamilton)
- Whiteout (2009) (Oni Press)
- Wilson (2017) (Drawn & Quarterly)
- Witchblade (2000, TV movie) (Top Cow Productions)
- Wolverine (Marvel Comics):
  - X-Men Origins: Wolverine (2009)
  - The Wolverine (2013)
  - Logan (2017)
  - Deadpool & Wolverine (2024)
- Wonder Woman (DC comics):
  - Wonder Woman (1974, TV movie)
  - The New Original Wonder Woman (1975, TV movie)
  - Wonder Woman (2009, animated direct-to-video film)
  - Wonder Woman (2011, unaired pilot)
  - Wonder Woman (2017)
  - Wonder Woman: Bloodlines (2019, animated direct-to-video film)
  - Wonder Woman 1984 (2020)

== X ==
- X-Men (Marvel comics):
  - X-Men: Pryde of the X-Men (1989, animated pilot)
  - X-Men (2000)
  - X2 (2003)
  - X-Men: The Last Stand (2006)
  - X-Men: First Class (2011)
  - X-Men: Days of Future Past (2014)
  - X-Men: Apocalypse (2016)
  - Dark Phoenix (2019)

== Upcoming films ==
- 2026
  - Rogue Trooper
  - Avengers: Doomsday
- 2027
  - Spider-Man: Beyond the Spider-Verse
  - Man of Tomorrow
  - Untitled Teenage Mutant Ninja Turtles: Mutant Mayhem sequel
  - Avengers: Secret Wars
- 2028
  - The Batman Part II
  - Untitled X-Men film
  - Ghost Rider
  - Dynamic Duo
  - Black Panther III

== See also ==
- List of films based on comic strips
- List of films based on manga
- List of films based on French-language comics
- Superhero film
- List of American superhero films
- List of comic-based films directed by women
- List of films based on DC Comics publications
- List of films based on Marvel Comics publications
- List of television series and films based on Archie Comics publications
- List of television series and films based on Boom! Studios publications
- List of television series and films based on Dark Horse Comics publications
- List of television series and films based on Harvey Comics publications
- List of television series and films based on IDW Publishing publications
- List of television series and films based on Image Comics publications
- List of television series and films based on Oni Press publications

Also related:

- List of films based on toys
- List of films based on radio series
- List of films based on video games
- List of television programs based on comics
