= List of programmes broadcast by ETV Bal Bharat =

This is a list of television programs currently and formerly broadcast by ETV Bal Bharat. The channel was launched on 27 April 2021. The channel focuses on action and teens. The channel primarily airs animated content from worldwide. It also broadcasts animated programs from Nickelodeon.

== Current programming ==
- Abhimanyu - The Young Yodha
- Angry Birds
- Avatar: The Last Airbender
- Baby Shark's Big Show!
- Bal Bahubali
- Detective Conan
- Catch! Teenieping
- Dora
- Everything's Rosie
- Golmaal Junior
- Jing-Ju Cats
- Kitty Is Not a Cat
- Loopdidoo - the Animated Series
- Pandeyji Pehelwan
- Pakdam Pakdai
- PAW Patrol
- Peter Pan
- Pinkfong Wonderstar
- Rainbow Bubblegem
- Robinhood
- Rubble & Crew
- Rudra
- Shiva
- SpongeBob SquarePants
- Teenage Mutant Ninja Turtles
- The Jungle Book
- The Sisters
- The Smurfs
- Winx Club
- Indian Pro Race League

== Former programming ==
- Arthur and the Children of the Round Table
- Charile Chaplin And Company
- Chotu Lambu and Robu
- Kong: King of the Apes
- The Mysterious Cities of Gold
- Pac-Man and the Ghostly Adventures
- Pleasant Goat and Big Big Wolf
- Super Monsters
- Teenage Mutant Ninja Turtles (2012 TV series)
- The Rising Sun - Stories of Great Personalities
- The Rising Sun - Stories of Mythological Heroes
- The Smurfs (1981 TV series)
- Three Squirrels
- Timo Fairyland
- Tin and Tan
- Tree House Stories
- Wisdom Tree - Moral Stories

== Movies ==
- The Angry Birds Movie
- The Angry Birds Movie 2
- Salma's Big Wish
- Spider-Man: Into the Spider-Verse
- Detective Conan: The Bride of Halloween
- Detective Conan: The Darkest Nightmare
- Loopdidoo : Treasure of Captain Nem Bones
- Captain Morten and the Spider Queen
- Winx Club 3D: Magical Adventure
- Ballerina (2016 film)
- Jack and the Cuckoo-Clock Heart
- Free Birds
- The Snow Queen (2012 film)
- Winx Club: The Secret of the Lost Kingdom
- Micropolis
- Space Dogs
- Loopdidoo's Incredible Christmas
- Dinofroz : The Origin
- Winx Club: The Mystery of the Abyss
- The Wheelers
- The Snow Queen 2
- Winx Club : Revenge of The Trix
- Gormiti All for One
- Monsters and pirates
- Dinofroz : Return to the past world
- Winx club: Bloom's Fate
- Magic Sport 2
- Virus attack
- Gormiti The fifth stone
- Winx Club : The battle for Magix
- Mother Teresa
- Winx Club : The shadow of Phoenix
- Dinofroz : An island in the sky
- Dino Time
- The Magic Snowflake
- Valley of the Lanterns
- Angel's friends
- Dive Olly Dive
- Sindbad
- Frozen in time
- Howard Lovecraft and the Frozen Kingdom
- Howard Lovecraft and the Undersea Kingdom
- Howard Lovecraft and the Kingdom of Madness
- Maya and the bee
- Sheep and Wolves
