= All Yours =

All Yours may refer to:

- All Yours (Crystal Kay album), a 2007 Japanese album by Crystal Kay
- All Yours (Astro album), released in 2021
- All Yours (2014 film), also known as Je suis à toi, a film directed by David Lambert
- All Yours (2016 film), a TV film with Dan Payne and Nicollette Sheridan
- All Yours, 2015 album by Widowspeak
- "All Yours (Tua)", a 1959 single by Jo Stafford on The Columbia Singles Collection, Vol. 1
- "All Yours", a song by Ben Haenow from the 2015 album Ben Haenow
