= Panda vs. Aliens =

2021 animated film

- Film poster
- Directed by: Sean Patrick O'Reiley
- Written by: Sean Patrick O'Reiley
- Produced by: Baiyi Chen; Steve Chicorel; Michelle O'Reilly
- Starring: Dan Payne; Sean Patrick O'Reiley; Chevy Chase; Scott McNeil; Ashleigh Ball; Andrew Gray; Kiefer O’Reilly; Geoff Gustafson; David Milchard
- Edited by: Chris Trinh
- Music by: George Streicher
- Production company: Arcana Studio
- Distributed by: China Film Group; Viva Pictures; SC Films
- Release date: April 9, 2021
- Running time: 80 minutes
- Country: Canada; China
- Language: English

Panda vs. Aliens is a 2021 animated sci-fi film written, directed and starring Sean Patrick O'Reiley, released on April 9, 2021. The film features The Unknowns, which are characters licensed from POW! Entertainment by Stan Lee who also served as executive producer until his death in November 2018.

== Plot ==
A group of aliens seek to conquer new worlds, and take particular notice of Earth, after seeing satellite broadcasts of TV shows of a powerful panda, Pandy.

== Development ==
The film was announced at Comic-Con. Modern Cinema Group signed on to co-finance the film with Stan Lee serving as an executive producer.

It is produced by China's Yisang Media and Los Angeles-Beijing Studios (LABS).

The movie was initially slated to be released in 2019, but eventually was released on April 9, 2021. The film was completed to "honor Stan Lee's final endeavors".
