= Jay Odjick =

American writer and illustrator

- Born: 9 September Rochester, New York, US
- Areas: writer, artist, producer
- Notable works: Kagagi

Jay Odjick (/ˈoʊdʒɪk/ OH-jik) is a writer, artist and television producer from the Kitigan Zibi Anishinabeg community in Québec, Canada. He is best known for his creation Kagagi (the raven), part of a growing number of Indigenous superheroes created by Indigenous writers and artists. In 2015, Kagagi was adapted into a 13-episode, half-hour animated series broadcast on APTN.

== Early life ==
Odjick was born in Rochester, New York, but as a child, he moved to the Kitigan Zibi Anishinabeg community, where his father was from, located east of Maniwaki, Quebec. He developed an interest in heroes and comic books early on and began writing stories at age 5. At age ten, he received his first rejection letter from a comic publisher, Marvel Comics.

== Career ==
Odjick began in comics by self publishing a three issue black and white limited series called The Raven that he wrote and illustrated in 2004. Odjick is also the author and artist of the graphic novel Kagagi: The Raven, published by Arcana Studio in 2011. The titular character, Kagagi, is a hero loosely based on the trickster/hero character "Raven" from the Anishinabe. In the comic series, a young man named Matthew Carver inherits supernatural powers and uses them to keep an ancient evil known as Windigo at bay. A television 13-episode series based on the graphic novel called Kagagi began airing on Aboriginal Peoples Television Network (APTN) in Canada on October 5, 2014, and later on FNX in the United States and in Australia. The half-hour animated series, produced by Odjick and Arcana's Sean Patrick O'Reilly, aired in English, in Algonquin, and in a format that combines English with 20 percent Algonquin. According to scholar Michael Sheyashe (Osage), Kagagi is part of a trend by Native American writers and artists to create relevant heroes that are not confined to the tropes associated with dated stereotypes and romanticism. Odjick uses the character of Kagagi to entertain, but also to teach Anishinaabe culture and language. His artwork and the Kagagi graphic novel were used as the centerpiece title and branding of Mazinbiige, The Indigenous Graphic Novel Collection, a permanent collection at the Elizabeth Dafoe Library at the University of Manitoba.

In 2014, Odjick was the Media Guest of Honour at Can-Con: The Conference on Canadian Content in Speculative Arts and Literature.

Odjick's short story "First Hunt", co-written with his brother Joel Odjick, appeared in Moonshot: The Indigenous Collection Volume I, which was recognized as the Best Book of 2015 in the young adult category by the School Library Journal. "First Hunt" has been added to the curriculum of Queen's University's Comics and Graphic Novels Course, while the collection itself is being taught at the University of Ottawa's Comic Books and Graphic Novels Course.

In 2015, Odjick's work was part of the exhibit "Super Heroes: Art! Action! Adventure!" at the Heard Museum, in Phoenix, Arizona.

In 2017, Odjick illustrated a children's book called Blackflies, which was written by the legendary children's author Robert Munsch. In the book, a girl named Helen must save her little sister after she is carried away by blackflies. Odjick and Munsch teamed up once again with the 2019 children's book Bear for Breakfast. In this tale, a boy named Donovan decides to catch a bear to eat for breakfast, just like his grandfather used to. In addition to illustration, Odijick also provided English-Algonquin and French-Algonquin translation.

== Television ==
Odjick serves as the lead writer, executive producer as well as lead designer on the television series Kagagi. In addition to his work on that series Odjick has also worked as a designer for and provided illustrations for the APTN series Mouki.

Odjick and his production company created three audio versions of Kagagi — one in English, one in Algonquin, and a broadcast version — primarily English with 20 percent of the dialogue in Algonquin. For Odjick, the goal was to give First Nations children "an entryway into the (Algonquin) language because the language is dying." He also sought to represent the language for older viewers; an elderly man told Odjick that he watches the program every week because, "it's the only chance I get to hear my language."

== Publications ==
Year	Title	
2004	Graphic novel KAGAGI: The Raven (Arcana Studio)	Creator, writer, artist
2004	Power Hour webcomic (Kevin Smith/View Askew Movie Poop Shoot website)	Creator, writer, penciller
2007	The Odyssey Presents (Blue Water Productions)	Penciller
2008	Clive Barker's The Midnight Meat Train (Doorways Magazine)	Illustrator
2009	Collection Zone Frousse (Éditions Z'Ailées)	Cover illustrator
2012	The Dreamer's Legacy (Kegedonce Press)	Cover illustrator
2013	The Thunder's Nest - Native American Classics (Graphic Classics)	Illustrator
2013	The Ocean Goes on Forever - Munsch Mania! Robert Munsch	Illustrator
2014	Emma's Gift (Kegedonce Press)	Illustrator
2014	Anishinabe Nigamodà (n) (Algonquin Tribal Council)	Illustrator
2015	First Hunt - MOONSHOT: The Indigenous Comics Collection (Alternate History Comics)	Co-writer, illustrator

== Activism ==
Odjick has been cited for his use of graphic novels and television as modern mediums to facilitate the retention of the Anishinaabe language.
