= Approbation =

Approbation may refer to:

- Approbation (Catholic canon law), an act in the Catholic Church by which a bishop or other legitimate superior grants to an ecclesiastic the actual exercise of his ministry
- Approbation (Germany), the process of granting a medical license in Germany
- Royal approbation, the process by which the election of the Speaker of the House of Commons is confirmed by the sovereign in the United Kingdom

== See also ==
- Approbation Comics, an independent comic book company
