= Sean O'Reilly =

Canadian comic book artist and filmmaker

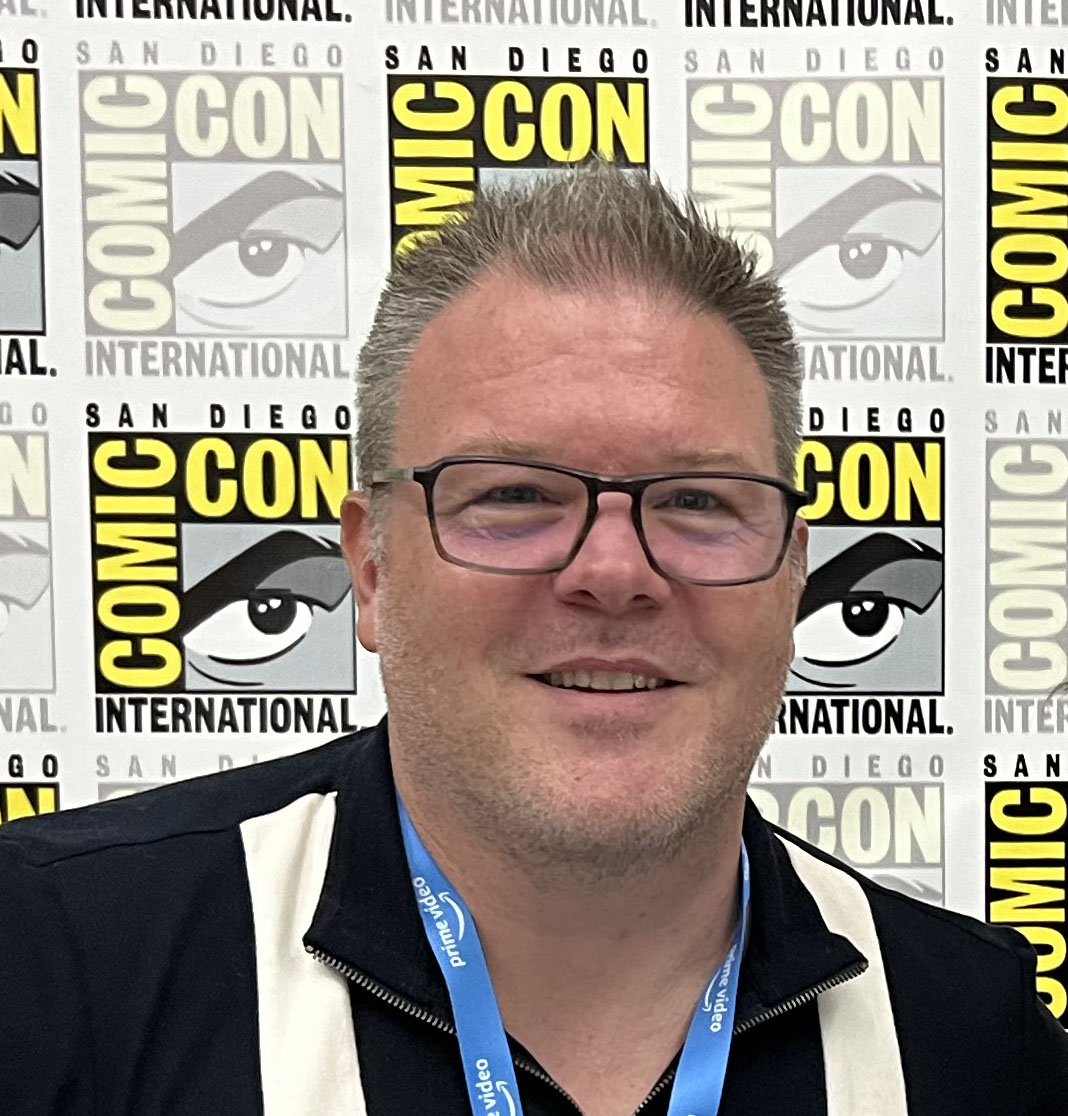
- Born: November 26, 1974 (age 51); Maple Ridge, British Columbia, Canada
- Occupation: CEO of Arcana Studio
- Spouse: Michelle
- Children: 4

Sean Patrick O’Reilly is a Canadian writer, director, producer and voice actor. He is the owner and operator of Arcana Studio, a comic book company and animation studio located in British Columbia, Canada. He is considered to be one of the most prolific independent comic book writers in Canada, with his works having been published in eleven countries and in numerous different languages.

== Career ==
O’Reilly has completed two degrees and a Masters, and teaches college level courses in Vancouver and the UCLA, in addition to being a Mentor and Scriptwriting consultant for Telefilm.

Notable graphic novels include Kade, which has gone on to be one of Arcana's top selling books, and has been published in numerous countries including Italy, Germany, France, Spain, Croatia and Poland. The first series by O’Reilly, Original Sun, came out in 2005, followed by Sun of Perdition in 2007, Shiva's Sun (2008), Rising Sun (2009), Red Sun (2010) and Prodigal Sun (2011). Kade In 2007, O'Reilly wrote The Clockwork Girl with co-creator Kevin Hanna. The steampunk fairytale went on to win the gold medal in the Moonbeam Awards. He followed up the success of The Clockwork Girl with The Gwaii after being inspired by Haida Gwaii. From 2011 to 2012, Sean O’Reilly wrote a book series called Mighty Mighty Monsters through Capstone Publishers. O’Reilly would later adapt the book series into three 44-minute animated specials of the same name.

=== Animation career ===
O'Reilly created Arcana Studio's animation division in 2012. The studio's animated projects are based on the graphic novels within their library. The animation division's first project was the animated feature The Clockwork Girl, based on the graphic novel, followed by a 13 episode mini-series of Kagagi: The Raven, which aired on APTN in September 2014. This was followed up by the animated feature Pixies in 2015, which included voice actors Christopher Plummer, Bill Paxton and Alexa Vega. O'Reilly wrote, directed and produced Pixies, and also voices the main protagonist, Joe Beck.

In 2016, Sean wrote, directed and produced, Howard Lovecraft and The Frozen Kingdom, the first in the three part trilogy. It is the first animated film adaptation of H.P. Lovecraft's work. The series was based on the graphic novel series written by Bruce Brown and published by Arcana.

In 2018, O'Reilly directed three animated features The Steam Engines of Oz, The Legend of Hallowaiian, and Howard Lovecraft and the Kingdom of Madness.

Sean O'Reilly is a producer for all of the animated projects produced by Arcana and has written and directed a majority of the projects.

== Personal life ==
O’Reilly resides in Coquitlam, British Columbia, with his wife, Michelle, and their four children.

== Comic book credits ==
- Clockwork Girl – co-creator/writer
- Dragon's Lair – editor
- Ezra – creator/writer/concept art
- Final Destination – editor
- The Gwaii – creator/writer/concept art
- Kade – creator/writer/concept art
- Kiss – Kompendium editor (through HarperCollins)
- Pixies – creator/write
- Paradox – editor
- Se7en – writer/editor
- The Steam Engines of Oz – creator/writer

== TV credits ==
- HBO's Entourage (Season 2, Episode 9) – set design and Angel Quest concept art
- Kagagi: The Raven – director, producer
- USA's Psych (Season 1, Episode 8) – set design and Green Spirit concept art
- Spike TV's Red Lotus – producer, concept development and animation

== Video game credits ==
- Capcom's Rockemen (writing and development)
- Disney Interactive's Turok (concept development and comic books)

== Movie credits ==
- A Dangerous Man (Paramount Pictures) – producer
- Beatdown (Lions Gate Entertainment) – producer and writer
- Circle of Pain (Lions Gate Entertainment) – producer and writer
- Clockwork Girl – producer
- Corrective Measures – director, writer and producer
- Dancing Ninja – animation director
- Go Fish – writer, director, and producer
- Heroes of the Golden Masks – director and producer
- Howard Lovecraft and the Frozen Kingdom – director, writer and producer
- Howard Lovecraft and the Kingdom of Madness – director, writer and producer
- Howard Lovecraft and the Undersea Kingdom – director, writer and producer
- The Legend of Hallowaiian – director, executive producer
- Paradox – producer
- Pixies – director, writer and producer
- The Steam Engines of Oz – director, writer and producer
- Playdate - producer

== Filmography ==
Year	Title	Role	Notes	Source
2015	Pixies	Joe Beck (voice)		
2016	Red Sonja: Queen of Plagues	Tevius / Brother 2 (voice)		
2016	Howard Lovecraft and The Frozen Kingdom	Spot / Cthulhu (voice)		
2017	Howard Lovecraft and the Undersea Kingdom	Spot / Cthulhu (voice)		
2018	The Steam Engines of Oz	Heflin (voice)		
2018	The Legend of Hallowaiian	Mr. Griffith / Menehune (voice)		
2018	Howard Lovecraft and the Kingdom of Madness	Spot / Cthulhu (voice)	Direct-to-video	
2019	Go Fish	Alex (voice)		
2023	Heroes of the Golden Masks	Thurman (voice)		

== Selected awards ==
- Business in Vancouver's Top 40 Under 40 (2008)
- Author and co-creator of The Clockwork Girl, winner of the Moonbeam Award for Top Children's Graphic Novel (2008)
- Foreword Magazine's recognition as one of the top Graphic Novels & Comics for The Clockwork Girl (2008), presented at Book Expo America
- Author of The Gwaii, winner of the Moonbeam Award for Top Children's Graphic Novel (2009)
