= Corrective Measures =

2022 American film by Sean O'Reilly

- Film poster
- Directed by: Sean O'Reilly
- Written by: Sean O'Reilly
- Based on: Corrective Measures by Grant Chastain
- Produced by: Sean O'Reilly; Michelle O'Reilly
- Starring: Bruce Willis; Michael Rooker
- Cinematography: Stirling Bancroft
- Edited by: Elad Tzadok
- Music by: George Streicher
- Production companies: Arcana Productions LLC; The Exchange
- Distributed by: Tubi
- Release date: April 29, 2022
- Running time: 107 minutes
- Country: United States
- Language: English
- Box office: $34,489

Corrective Measures is a 2022 American superhero film written, produced and directed by Sean O'Reilly and starring Bruce Willis and Michael Rooker. It is based on the graphic novel of the same name by Grant Chastain. It is also O'Reilly's debut in a live-action feature film. Corrective Measures was released by Tubi in select theaters and VOD on April 29, 2022.

== Plot ==
Set in San Tiburon, the world's most dangerous maximum-security prison, designed to incarcerate supervillains and enhanced individuals. The facility is equipped with power inhibitors to neutralize the abilities of its inmates, ensuring control over the diverse and often dangerous population.

The narrative begins with the arrival of Payback, a zealous vigilante whose mission to hunt down enhanced humans leads to his incarceration at San Tiburon. His entry into the prison disrupts the existing balance of power among inmates and staff.

Warden Devlin, known as "The Overseer", is the corrupt and ambitious head of San Tiburon. He is particularly interested in Julius "The Lobe" Loeb, a notorious inmate with immense intellect and telekinetic abilities. The Lobe is rumored to have a hidden fortune, and Devlin is determined to extract its location to fund his luxurious retirement.

Among the inmates is Diego Diaz, a new prisoner whose sole ability is heightened empathy. Navigating the treacherous environment of San Tiburon, Diego must choose his allies carefully to avoid becoming a pawn in the deadly games between inmates and the warden.

As tensions escalate, alliances form and betrayals unfold. The power struggle between The Lobe and The Overseer intensifies, leading to a violent uprising within the prison. Amidst the chaos, Diego's empathetic abilities become crucial in mediating conflicts and seeking a path to survival.

The film culminates in a confrontation that challenges the corrupt systems in place, with characters forced to confront their own moral compasses. The resolution leaves the future of San Tiburon and its inhabitants hanging in the balance, questioning the true meaning of justice and redemption.

== Cast ==
- Bruce Willis as Julius "The Lobe" Loeb
- Michael Rooker as Overseer Warden Devlin
- Dan Payne as Payback
- Brennan Mejia as Diego Diaz
- Tom Cavanagh as Gordon Tweedy
- Kat Ruston as Officer Liz Morales
- Kevin Zegers as Captain Jason Brody
- Hayley Sales as Dr. Isabelle Josephs
- Daniel Cudmore as Diamond Jim
- Doug Bradley as Senator Zechariah

== Production ==
By September 2021, Bruce Willis, Michael Rooker, Dan Payne, Brennan Mejia, Tom Cavanagh, Kat Ruston, Kevin Zegers, Hayley Sales, and Daniel Cudmore were set to star in the film. Sean O'Reilly served as the film's director, writer, and producer.

== Release ==
The film debuted on April 29, 2022 on Tubi. Corrective Measures is one of the last films to star Willis, who retired from acting because he was diagnosed with frontotemporal dementia.

== Reception ==
=== Box office ===
As of May 25, 2023, Corrective Measures grossed $34,489 in the United Arab Emirates and South Korea.

=== Critical response ===
On the review aggregator website Rotten Tomatoes, 75% of 4 critics' reviews are positive, with an average rating of 4.4/10.
