= The Legend of Hallowaiian =

- Directed by: Sean O'Reilly
- Written by: David Swift; Scott Owen; Stephen Meier
- Starring: Noah Schnapp; Tia Carrere; Mark Dacascos; Vanessa Williams; Teilor Grubbs; Mark Hamill
- Production companies: Arcana Studio; SC Films; Fresh Baked Films
- Release date: September 16, 2018
- Running time: 82 minutes
- Country: Canada
- Language: English
- Box office: $53,738

The Legend of Hallowaiian (also known as Hallowaiian: Adventure Hawaii, and Halloween Island) is a 2018 Canadian animated adventure comedy film directed by Sean O'Reilly. It was released on DirecTV on September 20, 2018, followed by limited theatrical release in October.

The film was produced by King's Hawaiian's newly formed production company Fresh Baked Films, SC Films International and Arcana Studio.

== Plot ==
Terror arises on the Big Island of Hawaii. Three young friends try to restore peace to their home, after accidentally releasing a mythical monster on Halloween. They must use their wits and courage, and will learn the importance of family, friends and culture.

== Cast ==
- Vanessa Williams - Fire Goddess
- Tia Carrere - Nana
- Mark Dacascos - Pono
- Teilor Grubbs - Leilani
- Noah Schnapp - Kai
- Mark Hamill - Officer Duke
- Keifer O'Reilly - Eddie
- Page Feldman - Marge
- Sean Patrick O'Reilly - Mr. Griffith/Menehune
- Erick Dickens - Tom
- Dumi Owane - Teenage Girl

== Reception ==
Bobby LePire from Film Threat considered that the film is: ... "cute and offers younger viewers a fun and important message....however, the lack of detail in the backgrounds hurt the atmosphere the screenplay attempts to create."

Common Sense Media reviewed the film, stating: ... "This movie tells a simple and fairly satisfying story that will probably be absorbing for younger kids."

Lavanya from Red Carpet Crash depicts the film as "The movie succeeds in depicting the island in a beautiful way, taking the audience right to the ocean and breathtaking natural elements of Hawaii."
