= El Arsenal =

Mexican comic book series

Publication information
- Publisher: Arcana Studios
- Format: Ongoing series
- Publication date: 2005

Creative team
- Written by: Salvador Vázquez
- Artist: Daniel Pérez

El Arsenal is a Mexican comic book series, created by writer Salvador Vázquez and artist Daniel Pérez. The comic was first released in 2005 and is published by Arcana Studio.

== Story ==
The world is divided by chaos. Due to a nuclear incident that activated the San Andreas Fault, Mexico's Baja California peninsula and California are separated from the North American continent. The situation in South America is apparently worse as former countries fight to regain their independence after the region is invaded by Japan. "El Sistema" (The System) is the only remaining power, an underground organization that recruits and controls mercenaries and bounty hunters who act as soldiers, assassins and messengers. El Sistema has but one rule; Supply and Demand.

This is the world of El Arsenal, a story about mercenaries, the backbone of El Sistema, the organization that rules the world. Without them, rivals organizations could hardly harm each other and seize control. Because even in this world, where chaos reigns, no one dares attack first, as they know that someone else is always prepared to strike back without mercy at the first sign weakness. Mercenaries must get the job done, as discreetly as possible.
