= Heroes of the Golden Mask =

- Film poster
- Directed by: Sean O'Reilly
- Written by: Jim Kammerud; Brian Smith
- Based on: The Ruined City by John Wilson
- Produced by: Michelle O’Reilly; Sean O’Reilly
- Starring: Patton Oswalt; Natasha Liu Bordizzo; Byron Mann; Ron Perlman; Osric Chau; Christopher Plummer
- Edited by: Jason Cooper
- Music by: Eric Xin Hu; Gordan McGhie; George Streicher
- Production companies: CG Bros Entertainment; Arcana Studio; Trigger Music; Heroes of The Golden Mask Films
- Distributed by: Gravitas Ventures
- Release date: June 9, 2023
- Running time: 88 minutes
- Country: Canada
- Language: English

Heroes of the Golden Mask is a 2023 Canadian animated film directed by Sean O'Reilly. It features the voices of Patton Oswalt, Byron Mann, Ron Perlman, Osric Chau and Christopher Plummer in his final film role.

== Voice cast ==
- Patton Oswalt as Aesop
- Byron Mann as Jiahao
- Christopher Plummer as Rizzo
- Ron Perlman as Kunyi
- Osric Chau as Zhu
- Natasha Liu Bordizzo as Li
- Sean Patrick O'Reilly as Thurman
- Kiefer O'Reilly as Charlie
- Jack Gillett as Brian
- Zeus Mendoza as Zuma
- King Lau as King Yufu
- Kingston Chan as Mei
- Jett Wu as Maly
- Rickie Wang as Min
- Albert Steven Tsai as Zhang
- Michelle O'Reilly as Officer Meyers

== Production ==
Plummer completed his voice work before his death on February 5, 2021.

== Release ==
Gravitas Ventures released the film on digital on June 9, 2023.

== Reception ==
The film has a 14% rating on Rotten Tomatoes based on seven reviews.
