= Arcana Studio =

Canadian animation studio

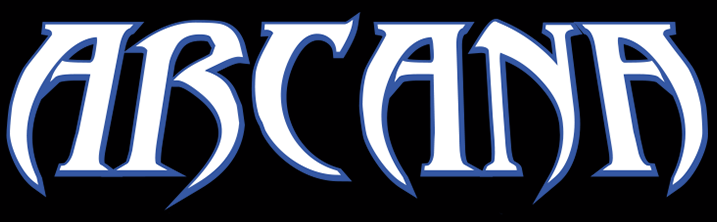
- Type: Private
- Industry: Comics and animation
- Founded: 2004; 22 years ago
- Founder: Sean O'Reilly
- Headquarters: Burnaby, British Columbia, Canada
- Area served: North America
- Key people: Sean O'Reilly (CEO)
- Products: The Clockwork Girl; Pixies; Heroes of the Golden Mask
- Website: arcana.com

Arcana Studio is a Canadian animation studio in Burnaby, British Columbia, Canada. Founded as a comic book publisher by former Coquitlam, British Columbia school teacher; Sean O'Reilly in 2004, it opened an animation division in 2012.

== Overview ==
Arcana is Canada's largest publisher of comics and graphic novels, with over 300 titles, spanning across a variety of genres, in its library. Arcana titles have been translated into different languages, including French, Italian, Greek, Spanish and Polish. It was formed in 2004 with the publication of the first issue of the comic book series Kade. The issue was written by O'Reilly and illustrated by artist Eduardo Garcia. With Diamond Comics as the distributor, Arcana's first comic went on shelves December 31, 2003.

In 2005, Arcana was presented with the Joe Shuster Award for Outstanding Publisher of The Year based on sales during their first year, as voted by the retailers and readers. On April 13, 2005, Kade: Identity become the publisher's first trade paperback book.

The Clockwork Girl #0 published with over 150,000 copies on December 5, 2007. It was written by Sean O’Reilly and Kevin Hanna, with Grant Bond as the drawing and coloring artist. A few months later, The Clockwork Girl won silver medal for The Moonbeam Award for Top Comic/Graphic Novel, as well as the Graphic Novel of the Year.

On October 1, 2009, Arcana bought The Devil's Due library of graphic novels, acquiring characters such as Banzai Girl, Kore, and Blade of Kumori.

Mighty Mighty Monsters was published on September 1, 2010. It was later turned into three 44-minute animated specials.

In 2012, Arcana opened an animation division to develop and produce its content for all platforms including film, television, direct-to-home and digital media. With the opening of its animation division, Arcana Studio released their first animated feature The Clockwork Girl in 2014, based on the graphic novel of the same name. On February 15, 2012, Arcana bought The Blue Water library of graphic novels, which included titles like 10th Muse, Legend of Isis, Leprechaun and Blackbeard Legacy.

Arcana went on to produce Kagagi: The Raven, a 13 episode TV mini-series about a First Nations superhero which aired on APTN (Aboriginal Peoples Television Network) and made its debut in 2014. The studio's continued success led to the development of its own intellectual properties like Pixies and the Howard Lovecraft trilogy. Pixies was Arcana's first independently created feature involving well-known actors such as Academy Award winner Christopher Plummer, Alexa PenaVega and Bill Paxton. Pixies was written and directed by Sean O'Reilly, who was nominated at the 2016 Leo Awards for best Direction in an Animation Program for his work on the film.

In 2016, Howard Lovecraft and the Frozen Kingdom was released, the first in the three part series. It is based on the works of H.P. Lovecraft and the graphic novel created by Bruce Brown. The film features the voices of Christopher Plummer, Jane Curtin, Ron Perlman and Doug Bradley. The film won the Official Selection and the Best in Category Sci-Fi title at the 2016 Hot Springs International Horror Film Festival.

Its sequel, Howard Lovecraft and the Undersea Kingdom, was released in 2017. Mark Hamill joined the cast as Dr. Henry Armitage. Howard Lovecraft and the Undersea Kingdom took home the Best of the Festival Sci-Fi title at the 2017 Hot Springs International Horror Film Festival, as well as an Official Selection at FEARNYC and a Best Director win.

The Legend of Hallowaiian had its "orange carpet" premiere in Los Angeles on September 22, 2018, and on DirecTV on the 18th. The film stars Vanessa Williams, Mark Hamill and Noah Schnapp.

== Films, television series, and shorts ==
=== Animated films ===
Title	Release date	Notes
The Clockwork Girl	January 2014	In joint production with Legacy Films and Luximation, based on the graphic novel of the same name by Sean O'Reilly and Kevin Hanna. Features Alexa Vega as Tesla, Jesse McCartney as Huxley, Carrie-Anne Moss as Admiral Wells, Jeffrey Tambor as Wilhelm the Tinkerer, and Brad Garrett as T-Bolt.
Pixies	June 2015	Arcana's first independently created feature, based on the graphic novel of the same name by Sean O'Reilly. Features Bill Paxton as Eddie Beck, Christopher Plummer as The Pixie King, and Alexa Vega as Michelle.
Howard Lovecraft and the Frozen Kingdom	October 2016	Based on the graphic novel of the same name by Bruce Brown. Features Christopher Plummer as Dr. Herbert West, and Ron Perlman as The Shoggoth.
Howard Lovecraft and the Undersea Kingdom	October 2017	Based on the graphic novel of the same name by Bruce Brown. Features Mark Hamill as Dr. Henry Armitage, Jeffery Combs as King Abdul, Christopher Plummer as Dr. Herbert West, and Ron Perlman as The Shoggoth.
The Steam Engines of Oz	Late 2017	Based on the graphic novel of the same name by Erik Hendrix.
The Legend of Hallowaiian	September 2018	In a joint production with SC Films and Fresh Baked Films. Features Noah Schnapp as Kai, Teilor Grubbs as Leilani, Vanessa Williams as Fire Goddess, Tia Carrere as Nana, Mark Dacascos as Pono, and Mark Hamill as Officer Duke.
Howard Lovecraft and the Kingdom of Madness	December 2018	Based on the graphic novel of the same name by Bruce Brown. Features Mark Hamill as Dr. Henry Armitage, Christopher Plummer as Dr. Jeffrey West, and Finn Wolfhard as Herbert West.
Go Fish	November 2019	Go Fish is Arcana's is an animated undersea adventure, following the story of a parrotfish named 'Alex'.
Panda vs. Aliens	2021	With original characters from Arcana and alien characters, The Unknowns licensed from Stan Lee's POW! Entertainment. Features Dan Payne as Bruno, Sean O'Reilly as Pandy, Chevy Chase as King Karoth, Scott McNeil as Duke, and Ashleigh Ball as Penny,
Heroes of the Golden Mask	2023	Heroes of the Golden Mask is an action-adventure epic inspired by the ancient masks of Sanxingdui, and tells the story of a contemporary teenager who is magically transported back in time to a mysterious, lost city. The film stars Christopher Plummer as Rizzo, Ron Perlman as Kunyi, Patton Oswalt as Aesop, Byron Mann as Jiahao and Osric Chau as Zhu.

=== Live-action features ===
Title	Release date	Notes
Paradox	November 2010	Based on the graphic novel of the same name, Paradox is the story of homicide detective Sean Nault, set on a parallel Earth whose technology is powered exclusively by magic. Sean investigates a baffling series of murders committed by a means he's never seen before: science. Features Kevin Sorbo as Det. Sean Nault, Christopher Judge as Captain Papillo, and Steph Song as Lenore.

=== Animated television series ===
Title	Years	Notes
Kagagi: The Raven	2014	Aired on APTN, Kagagi is a First Nations superhero is based on the graphic novel of the same name. It was Arcana's first television series.

=== Short films ===
- The Gwaii - Based on Haida Gwaii, and the graphic novel of the same story.
- Memo – A series of 30-second segments aimed at children.
- Polkarella – A short about an umbrella/creature hybrid.
- Pixies – A short film based on the comics and graphic novel of the same name.

=== Select titles ===
- 100 Girls: The First Girl (2004–2006)
- All Fall Down (2011)
- American Wasteland (2007)
- Amnesia (2011)
- Amour - Volume 1 and 2 (2012)
- Ant: Days Like These (2004–2005)
- Arcana Studio Presents (2004-current, Free Comic Book Day annual)
- Ark (2013)
- The Art of ReBoot (2007)
- Banzai Girl (2007)
- Blank Slate (TBD)
- Blood, Shells, & Roses (2011)
- The Book (2012)
- Burn (2008)
- Champions of the Wild Weird West
- Chaotic Soldiers (2010)
- Corrective Measures (2008)
- Creepsville (2011)
- Dark Horrors (2006)
- Dead Men Tell No Tales (2005–2006)
- Deadly Harvest (2012)
- Dragon's Lair (2006–2007)
- El Arsenal: Unknown Enemy (2005–2006)
- Eve: Vampire Diva (2007)
- The Evil Tree (2012)
- Ezra:
  - Ezra: Egyptian Exchange (2004–2005)
  - Ezra: Evoked Emotions (2006–2007)
  - Ezra vs. 10th Muse (2006)
- The Fix (2009)
- Frozen Wasteland (2007)
- Gearhead (2007)
- Grunts (2006)
- Helen Killer (2008)
- Howard Lovecraft and the Frozen Kingdom
- John Henry and The Steam Age (2012)
- Jova's Harvest (2005–2006)
- Kade:
  - Kade: Identity (2004–2005)
  - Kade: Sun of Perdition (2006–2007)
  - Kade: Shiva's Sun (2007–2008)
  - Kade: Rising Sun (2010)
  - Kade: Red Sun (2010)
  - Kade: Prodigal Sun (2011)
  - Kade: Mourning Sun (2012)
  - Kade: Tribal Sun (2014)
  - Kade: Children of the Black Sun (2014)
- Koni Waves (2006)
  - Koni Waves (2006)
  - Koni Waves: The Headdress of the Undead (2007)
  - Koni Waves: First Wave (2007)
  - Koni Waves/Demonslayer (2007)
  - Koni Waves: Ghouls Gone Wild! (2008)
  - Avengelyne vs. Koni Waves (2009)
- Lethal Instinct - Volume 1 (2012)
- Marlow (2008)
- The Network (2008)
- Paradox (2005–2006)
- Penance: Trial of the Century (2008)
- Poe & Phillips (2011)
- Shadowflame (2007)
- SideShows (2011)
- Space Ace (2009)
- Starkweather: Legacy (2004–2005)
- Stranger Danger (2009)
- Sundown: Arizona (2005)
- The Truman Virus (2012)
- Velvet Rope (2008)

=== All ages titles ===
- The Ancient Oak (2012)
- A Cat Named Haiku (2010)
- A Cat Named Haiku 2: The Dust Bunny (2013)
- Clockwork Girl (2007)
- Gordon The Giraffe (2012)
- The Gwai (2008)
- Howard Lovecraft and the Frozen Kingdom (2009)
- Howard Lovecraft and the Undersea Kingdom (2012)
- Howard Lovecraft and the Kingdom of Madness (2014)
- Mwumba (2008)
- My Best Friend's a Booger (2011)
- Pixies (2012)
- Ralph Filmore, Paranormal Investigator (2011)
- Scrooge and Santa (2011)
- Summer and Monkey
- Turning Tiger (2012)

The Arcanaverse is the world all the Arcana characters live in. Currently over 3000 individual indexed characters and creatures call the Arcanaverse home. From the Arcanaverse stem new stories and adventures, including the comic book series The Intrinsic.

=== The Intrinsic ===
The Intrinsic was debuted on Free Comic Book Day 2012, and was the first Arcanaverse title. The series features hit Arcana characters Kade, Philosopher Rex, Kore, and Candice Crow, as well as cameos by many others. The Intrinsic also made a guest appearance in the animated TV series Kagagi (2014). Volume 2 of The Intrinsic debuted at Free Comic Book Day 2014 and was written by Sean O'Reilly and Chris 'Doc' Wyatt.

== Motion comics ==
Arcana has turned some of its comics and graphic novels into motion comics:

- The Steam Engines of Oz
- The Gwaii
- Pixies
- The Clockwork Girl
- Abiding Perdition
- Kagagi

== Awards ==
- Arcana was named Most Promising Company at the 2013 Digi Awards, Arcana's CEO, Sean O'Reilly, was also named a finalist for Executive of the Year at the 2013 Digi Awards.
- CEO Sean O'Reilly received Playback's Ten to Watch award in 2013.
- Arcana was named Best Visual Features 2013 by Arlene Dickinson's YouInc.

== Kickstarter: The Steam Engines of Oz ==
In Arcana's first experience with a crowd-sourcing project, The Steam Engines of Oz was first introduced for Free Comic Book Day, 2013. The idea was to release issues FCBD, 1, 2, and 3 of the collected trade, and then if the Kickstarter campaign proved to be a success, a second volume of the comic would be released. The Steam Engines of Oz: The Geared Leviathan was successful and was produced, thanks to the supporters on Kickstarter.
