= 100 Girls (comics) =

- 100 Girls #1 (August 2004)

Publication information
- Publisher: Arcana Studio
- No. of issues: 7

Creative team
- Created by: Adam Gallardo, Todd Demong
- Written by: Adam Gallardo (script/lettering)
- Artist(s): Todd Demong (pencils/inks)
- Colorist(s): Lucas Marangon, Marina Quevedo, Josh "Bee" Perez

Collected editions
- 100 Girls: The First Girl: ISBN 978-1-4169-6109-3

100 Girls is a comic book series created by Adam Gallardo and Todd Demong, and published by Arcana Studio.

== Plot ==
Sylvia Mark is a thirteen-year-old girl who feels like an outcast from the other kids her age. She skipped two grades, is amazingly strong, and has Olympic-level gymnastic agility. Sylvia also feels incomplete, and occasionally has strange dreams. Night after night these dreams seem to be harbingers of something dark. What she does not know is that she is just one of one hundred girls created as part of a genetics experiment, each with their own superpowers. Eight girls were taken out of the facility, and grew up secretly across the country; Sylvia was one of them.
