= All Fall Down (comics) =

- Cover of All Fall Down

Publication information
- Publisher: Arcana Studio
- Format: Limited series
- Publication date: 2011
- Main character(s): Sophie Mitchell; The Pantheon

Creative team
- Written by: Casey Jones (author)
- Artist(s): Barnaby Bagenda; Al Jerek Torrias
- Letterer(s): Andrew Diroll-Black

Collected editions
- All Fall Down: ISBN 1-926914-23-6

All Fall Down is a 2011 six-issue American comic book written by Casey Jones, edited by William Marks, and illustrated by a host of artists including Jason Reeves, Gian Fernando, Brian Brinlee, Anvit Randeria, Cirque Studios, and Pericles Junior. It was published by Arcana Studios. The comic explores what happens to superheroes and supervillains who irrevocably lose their powers, and deals with the notions of death and loss.

== Publication history ==
Early in its production, the book was partially funded through crowd-sourced fundraising site Kickstarter.

== Plot ==
Thirteen-year-old Sophie Mitchell just accidentally stole every superpower known to man. She can't turn them off or give them back. The world must now make do without their most powerful heroes, a team known as The Pantheon, and the heroes themselves must come to terms with their changing identities, helplessness, and a looming threat that suddenly appears.
