= The Steam Engines of Oz =

- Official Poster
- Directed by: Sean Patrick O'Reilly
- Written by: Sean Patrick O'Reilly
- Based on: The Steam Engines of Oz by Erik Hendrix, Sean Patrick O'Reilly & Yannis Roumboulias
- Starring: William Shatner; Ron Perlman; Julianne Hough; Dan Payne; Ashleigh Ball; Scott McNeil; Matthew Kevin Anderson
- Production companies: Arcana Studio; 3Doubles Producciones
- Distributed by: Cinedigm
- Release date: June 5, 2018
- Running time: 79 minutes
- Country: Canada
- Language: English

The Steam Engines of Oz is a 2018 Canadian fantasy adventure animated film directed and written by Sean Patrick O'Reilly. The screenplay is based on the graphic novel of the same name by Erik Hendrix. It stars the voices of William Shatner, Ron Perlman, Julianne Hough, Ashleigh Ball, and Scott McNeil.

== Plot ==
A hundred years after the events that occurred in The Wonderful Wizard of Oz and after the defeat of the Wicked Witch, there is a modernized Emerald City that is ruled by the once-revered hero the Tin Man. The Land of Oz is at risk as the city expands its territory further and further. The last hope comes from a young mechanic named Victoria Wright, who works underneath the city.

One day, Victoria gets a visit from Locasta, the Good Witch of the North, and her winged monkeys. Locasta warns Victoria that if the Emerald City continues to grow, all of Oz could lose its magic. Victoria decides to escape the Emerald City with Gromit the Munchkin technician and Phadrig Diggs, the younger brother of the famous “Wizard of Oz” Oscar Diggs.

Phadrig's old friend, Candice, helps the friends escape to the forest near the Emerald City. While walking through the forest, Victoria gets ambushed and kidnapped by the lions Otho, Lucilia, and Magnus, the son of Cowardly Lion. Gromit and Phadrig come to her rescue. Upon hearing that Victoria and her friends are against the Tin Man and his machines, the Lions told them where to find the Munchkins.

On their way to an isolated Munchkin village, Victoria, Gromit and Phadrig meet Heflin and his rebellious Munchkin gang. In a village, Victoria tries to reason with the Munchkins so that they could talk to the Tin Man, but to no avail. Irritated, Victoria decides to go back to the Emerald City and personally talk to the ruler of the city. She, Phadrig and Gromit meet Sir Blackburn and his guards, who were sent by Tin Man to find the fugitives. After listening to Victoria's plan, Sir Blackburn confesses that there's no place for Munchkins or magic in Tin Man's perfect world. Victoria and her friends refuse to go with the soldiers and fight back, but Gromit gets hurt. The Lions ambush the soldiers and fight them.

Later on, back in the Munchkin village, while Gromit was being taken care of, Phadrig saves his brother Oscar from falling off the invisible bridge. At the same time, in Emerald City, Tin Man decides to wage war against the Lions.

At the council, Oscar tells Victoria, the Lions, and Munchkins the Tin Man's backstory: before Tin Man there was a Munchkin named Nick Chopper the Woodsman. He fell in love with Nimmie Amee, who was a servant to the Wicked Witch of the East. The Witch enchanted Nick's axe, and Nick began to lose his human body limb by limb, until he became a man completely made of tin. He also lost his heart, and, believing that marriage without a heart is one without love, he freed Nimmie from her vows. Years passed, and the Tin Man got rusted over, until he was rescued by a girl with a dog and a Scarecrow. Together they travelled to the Emerald City, where Nick got a new heart. Later, when he became the ruler of the Winkies, Tin Man began to reminisce about the times when he was human and when he was in love. He traveled to the Munchkin country to discover Nimmie's fate, only to find her old, bedridden, and living out her final days. Although the magic prevented Ozians from aging and dying, by the time it began to fade away. Desperate to save his beloved, Tin Man turned to the Good Witches, but their magic was useless against the effects of time. Then he traveled to the Emerald City, and there he began to build the Great Steam Engines of Oz to help the city progress and to save his true love. Tin Man became so obsessed with his work and his goal to save Nimmie, that he banished Munchkins and magic, and hung up his own heart for good.

Victoria, Oscar, Phadrig and Gromit decide to go to the Emerald City and free Scarecrow, while Munchkins and Lions create an alliance. On the battlefield, the Lions, and the Munchkins on battle planes fight against Tin Man's army, but the preponderance of forces is on the side of the enemy. Locasta and her flying monkeys come to distract the Tin Man's forces, and help Victoria and her friends buy some time to fly to the palace.

In a throne room, Victoria finds a quote engraved on the back of the throne: “the key lies together with love”. Turns out that it was a password to the Great Steam Engines of Oz. Behind them, the friends find a passageway with an elevator to the secret room, where they discover comatose Nimmie Amee, Tin Man's heart, and a disassembled Scarecrow. Once assembled, the Scarecrow tells the gang that he tried to reason with a Tin Man, but Tin Man was so angry at the Munchkins and magic, that, in a fit of rage, he tore Scarecrow's head off.

The Tin Man's army is victorious. Victoria and her friends return from the city. Victoria tells Tin Man that he's responsible not only for the success, but also the failures of the Emerald City, that ignoring of the failures can become harmful to those he cares about, and that together they can mend their mistakes. Victoria gives Tin Man his own heart back, and he proclaims the war over.

The Emerald City is celebrating the reconciliation of Ozians. While looking down on the celebration from the airship, Phadrig tells Victoria that the city will need a new ruler since Tin Man is stepping down. Victoria promises Phadrig that they will find his sons and restore the Emerald City to its former glory.

In a post-credits scene, the Tin Man comes to the secret room, and lets Nimmie Amee go into the afterlife.

== Production ==
Arcana Studio announced that they will be producing a “steampunk-ed re-imagining” of The Wonderful Wizard of Oz. It is a co-production animated feature with 3Doubles Productions and Arcana Studio.

== Cast ==
- Ashleigh Ball⁣ as Victoria Wright
- Erik Hendrix as Guards
- Scott McNeil⁣ as Phadrig Diggs / Otho
- Elijah Dhavvan as Gromit
- Harmony O'Reilly as Flying Monkey #1
- Phoenix O'Reilly as Flying Monkey #2
- Julianne Hough as Locasta
- Alison Wandzura as Candice
- Matthew Kevin Anderson as The Tin Man
- Dan Payne⁣ as Sir Blackburn
- Ron Perlman⁣ as Magnus
- Michelle O'Reilly as Lucilia
- Sean O'Reilly as Heflin
- Summer O'Reilly as Noomi
- Kiefer O'Reilly as Kemp
- William Shatner⁣ as Oscar “Oz” Diggs
- Geoff Gustafson as Scarecrow

== Release ==
It was released on Blu-ray and VOD on June 5, 2018.

== Reception ==
=== Critical response ===
Reviewing The Steam Engines of Oz for Film Threat, Bobby LePire gave it a 6.5 out of 10 rating and described it as "fun and exciting with solid character designs, and compelling stakes”, while criticizing “the low budget animation, hindering some of the awe of the land of Oz”.
