= Hayley Sales =

American singer-songwriter

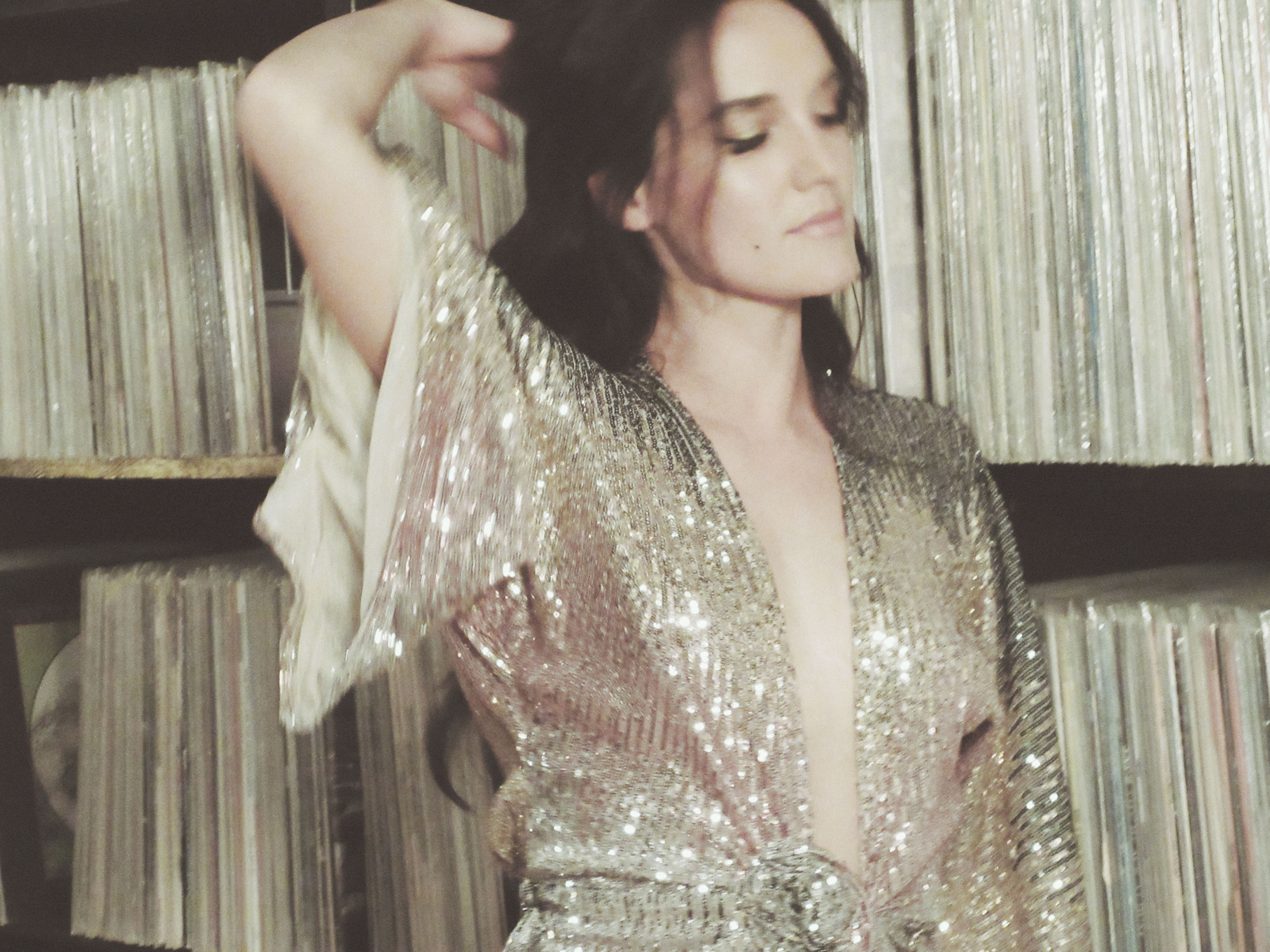
- Sales in 2020

Background information
- Born: August 31, 1990 (age 36); Washington, D.C., U.S.
- Genres: Soul; pop; acoustic rock
- Occupation: Musician
- Instruments: Piano; vocals; guitar
- Years active: 2007–present
- Label: Universal Music
- Website: www.hayleysales.com

Hayley Sales (born August 31, 1990) is an American singer-songwriter. Her debut album Sunseed was released on June 19, 2007; songs "Keep Drivin" and "What You Want" reached #11 on the Japan Hot 100 and #45 on the Canadian Hot 100, respectively. Her second album, When the Bird Became a Book, was released on June 21, 2010, and includes duets with musicians G. Love and Donavon Frankenreiter.

== Early life ==
Sales' mother was a dancer and writer, and her father was a musician and sound engineer (Miles Davis, the Grateful Dead, and the Ramones), who operated GlassWing Studios out of the upper floor of their Washington D.C home. "I was surrounded by music at all hours of the day. All types of music. I remember the melodies and beats actually rattling the floorboards. My childhood had a soundtrack filled up with everything from R&B and Jazz to Rock and Americana." For many recording sessions, Sales was allowed to sit in and watch the recording process.

The family relocated to Portland, Oregon when Sales was three. Within several months, she began playing piano and participating in local musical theatre productions. She learned to sing by studying the voices of Judy Garland, Billie Holiday, and Nina Simone, among others.

== Career ==
=== 2000—2008 ===
By middle school, Sales was accepted into the private performing arts school the Northwest Academy, where she studied both classical and jazz music, writing, the Meisner Technique, dance and film-making. At the age of 12, she landed the role of Juliet in Concordia University's production of Romeo and Juliet, having lied about her age. In September 2001, she was flown to Washington D.C to perform at the Pentagon for the WWII Ace Pilots Convention. By the time she graduated, two years early at sixteen with honours, Sales had been in over 100 dramatic and musical plays.

Following graduation, her family moved again, this time to an organic blueberry farm on Vancouver Island, British Columbia. Sales began to learn how to use the recording studio from the ground up. Over the summer of 2003, she took part in an acting intensive, organized by Canadian casting director Maureen Webb. This workshop led her to sign with her longtime acting manager, Vickie Petronio. Other students included Cory Monteith and Dustin Milligan.

Within a half of year of being on the island, Sales landed a lead role in a teen horror film, Sleepover Nightmare, leading to a move to Los Angeles to pursue acting shortly after she turned seventeen. The move ended abruptly when a bout of acid reflux, brought on by an eating disorder, caused her to lose her voice. "For over a year, I could barely talk. It was the hardest year of my life. Everything that I had identified with was gone. I was speechless. Literally," she recalls.

During that year, Sales had dedicated her time to songwriting and mastering the recording studio. When her voice returned, she immediately put together a band and recorded her first full-length demo album, First Flight. Upon its completion, Sales began promoting local shows in and around Vancouver Island and Vancouver, British Columbia, drawing over two hundred people. She then recorded her second full-length demo, Drifter, which drew the attention of the media.

In the fall of 2005, Sales performed at a showcase in Vancouver, during which Steve Herman (Live Nation) heard her sing. By December, she was signed by Randy Lennox, to Universal Music Canada.

=== 2006–2012 ===
Sales began recording her first major label recording in the spring of 2006, Sunseed. Her father, Richard Sales, co-produced the album, which they recorded on her parents' blueberry farm. Sunseed was released in 2007, with the singles "What You Want" and "Keep Drivin" landing in the Canadian Top 40 and on the charts in Japan. In 2008, Sales won Best Mainstream Artist at the Canadian Radio Music Awards. From 2007 to 2009, she toured internationally with Jason Mraz, Gavin DeGraw, INXS, the Spice Girls, Feist, Justin Nozuka, and the Cat Empire, gaining momentum in Australia, Japan, Canada and Europe. When not touring, Sales lived in Perth, Australia surfing and writing music.

In 2010, Sales began recording her sophomore album, featuring guest appearances by G Love and Donavon Frankenreiter, When the Bird Became A Book, which was released in 2012. The music video for "Just Pretend", directed by Josh Forbes (Sarah Bareilles, The Fray), generated over five million views in three weeks following its release. O'Neill Surf Company sponsored Sales as a musical ambassador.

=== 2012–2016 ===
In 2012, while waiting to begin recording her third album, Sales moved back to Los Angeles to pursue acting, after several years of focusing solely on music. She signed with Paradigm Agency and began studying acting extensively. In 2013, she moved to Vancouver, British Columbia for a recurring role on the TV show Cedar Cove. Her contract with Universal Music ended during this time, and she began raising money through Pledge Music to record her next album. As the album neared completion, Mike Rittberg, former GM at Verve Music Group USA, with whom Sales had been in touch for several years, signed her to his label. In October 2015, Sales signed the contract and began completing the record. It was tentatively scheduled for release in the spring of 2017. The highly anticipated album was co-produced by Richard Sales, horns/strings arranged by Carl Marsh (Stax Volt), recorded at Oceanway Studios in Nashville, Tennessee, mixed by Michael Brauer at Electric Lady Studios NYC, and mastered by Joe LaPorta. The masters were delivered in May 2016.

Sales also did voice and motion-capture acting as leading character Rachel S'Jet in the 2016 game Homeworld: Deserts of Kharak.

== Albums ==
Year	Album	Release date	Label
2007	Sunseed	June 19, 2007	Universal Records
2007	Women & Songs, Vol. 11	December 4, 2007	Warner Music Group
2010	When the Bird Became a Book	June 21, 2010	Universal Records
2017	The Misadventures	Spring 2017	Universal Records
