= Pixies (film) =

- Pixies promotional poster
- Directed by: Sean Patrick O'Reilly
- Written by: Sean Patrick O'Reilly
- Based on: Pixies by Sean Patrick O'Reilly
- Produced by: Sean Patrick O'Reilly; Michelle O'Reilly
- Starring: Sean Patrick O'Reilly; Alexa PenaVega; Christopher Plummer; Bill Paxton; Carlos Pena Jr.
- Edited by: Brendan Hansell
- Music by: James Danderfer
- Production company: Arcana Studio
- Distributed by: Shout! Factory
- Release date: June 5, 2015
- Running time: 78 minutes
- Country: Canada
- Language: English

Pixies is a 2015 Canadian animated fantasy feature film released by Arcana Studio. It is based on the 2012 graphic novel of the same name. Pixies is written, produced and directed by Sean O'Reilly, the author of the graphic novel, who was nominated for the 2016 Leo Awards for best Direction in an Animation Program for his work on the film.

== Plot ==
Joe Beck has lost the love of his life thanks to a Pixie's Curse, and he now needs to figure out how to get his girlfriend back, learn more about the mysterious Pixies and undo a bad deed he did long ago.

== Cast ==
- Sean Patrick O'Reilly as Joe Beck and additional voices
- Alexa PenaVega as Michelle Meyers
- Christopher Plummer as Pixie King, Samuel and William's Father
- Bill Paxton as Eddie Beck
- Carlos Pena Jr. as William, a black haired Pixie who warns Sam to be nicer to his best friends Twitch and Max
- Geoff Gustafson as Samuel, a brown-haired green-eyed male pixie who wants to go with Daisy to the Glowworm Trail
- Alison Wandzura as Gail Meyers
- David Milchard as Pixie Page
- Kiefer O'Reilly as Worker Pixie
- Eric Pollins as Henry Meyers / Old Man Tom / Vincent
- Summer O'Reilly as Daisy

== Awards ==
- 2016 Leo Awards Nomination - Best Direction in an Animation Program
