= Paradox (2010 film) =

2010 Canadian television film

- Genre: Science Fiction; Thriller
- Based on: Paradox by Christos N. Gage
- Written by: Christos N. Gage; Ruth Fletcher
- Directed by: Brenton Spencer
- Starring: Kevin Sorbo; Steph Song; Christopher Judge
- Theme music composer: John Sereda; Paul Michael Thomas
- Country of origin: Canada
- Original language: English

Production
- Executive producers: Nicholas Bonavia; Bernie Melanson; Sean O'Reilly
- Producers: Deboragh Gabler; Aaron L. Gilbert
- Cinematography: Curtis Petersen
- Editor: Nicole Ratcliffe
- Running time: 83 min.
- Production companies: American World Pictures; Bron Studios; Legacy Filmworks; Arcana Studio

Original release
- Network: Syfy
- Release: November 19, 2010

Paradox is a 2010 science-fiction television film starring Kevin Sorbo, Steph Song and Christopher Judge, directed by Brenton Spencer, and based on a three-part graphic novel miniseries by Christos Gage.

== Plot ==
Sean Nault is a detective in a world just like ours — except that magic rules the day and almost nothing is known of science. Someone is killing people using a device that can project a metal slug into the victim's body, the lead revealing no trace of magic when subjected to analysis. Nault is in charge of the investigation, but is somewhat controversial for his non-use of magic in investigations, such as relying on his own perceptions to tell if a suspect is lying rather than using truth spells.

While investigating the weapon's possible origins, Nault encounters Winston Churchill, a 130-year-old sorcerer – one of the few people powerful enough to potentially cloak the spells powering such a weapon – who reveals the existence of a strange parallel universe where there is no magic but science rules supreme, and a way to cross between the two worlds. Churchill explains that the other world has apparently not developed magic due to the higher concentration of iron in that world. He also states that Nault is uniquely qualified to travel into the other world because he is one of the few people who does not have a counterpart in the 'pragmatic' world of science, allowing him to exist with equal ease in both worlds.

When Churchill is injured by a bullet in a subsequent attack, he cannot be treated by magic due to the iron nature of the weapon, leaving Nault to team up with Lenore, a pragmatist — the local term for scientist — to carry out further investigations. Nault and Lenore travel into the other world after Churchill teaches the necessary spell of transference to Helen, the department's necromancer (mortician), due to his own failing state.

Exploring this new world, Nault is fascinated when he watches crime drama and learns about the various scientific methods used to identify bodies and determine guilt, particularly when he learns that his 'trick' of observing suspects is actually a valid scientific method. Nault visits a local police department posing as a Los Angeles detective and learns that their suspect is Professor Hillman, a physicist who recently vanished. He acquires the file on Hillman's disappearance and visits Hillman's house, where he discovers a runed mirror that provides ability to travel between the two worlds, as well as several DVDs of recorded blackmail material. The investigation is hampered when the local police learn that Nault and Lenore do not exist, but they are fortunately returned to their world just as they are cornered by the detectives. Nault determines that the DVDs he found are of a senator involved with drug dealing and corruption. He tracks the senator down, but the man is killed in a car crash when he attempts to run Nault over and passes right through him thanks to the only spell Nault can use, an intangibility spell.

Churchill assures Nault that he has no regrets about dying now and gives Nault a ring, saying that Nault is the person who should possess it. Following Churchill's death, Nault and Lenore discuss the other world, Lenore saying that she actually preferred it there because she has always found magic so inexplicable, noting at the same time that their supposedly 'equal' world is still based on the level of magical skill that each person can control.

Attempting to track the mirror Hillman used to travel to the other world, Nault realises from the file he received in the other world that the Hillman in the morgue is the magic world's version of Hillman, as he lacks the gold fillings the other world's Hillman possessed. Nault goes to Hillman's house and encounters Hillman's twin brother, Glen, and learns about Hillman's dissatisfaction in the magical world due to his lack of magical ability. Nault discovers that his captain, Papillo, is involved in the conspiracy; the senator was just a useful pawn to gain the necessary power. Nault and Lenore are taken hostage and taken to a base where Hillman's counterpart is waiting.

Papillo reveals that he and Hillman, who came in contact with each other during Hillman's experiments to breach the dimensional barrier, intend to collapse the barriers between the two worlds to bring them together so that science and magic can come together as the survivors of the two worlds learn from each other; the drug dealings simply provided the necessary finances to gather the equipment. Although Papillo begins the ritual, Hillman and Papillo are killed when Nault intervenes. As Nault and Lenore escape, Nault promises her that they will never stop trying to return to the other world, although Lenore assures him in return that, for the moment, she belongs where he is, the two kissing as the base collapses behind them.

== Cast ==
- Kevin Sorbo as Detective Sean Nault
- Steph Song as Lenore
- Christopher Judge as Captain Papillo
- Alan C Peterson as Winston Churchill
- Alisen Down as Helen
- Jerry Wasserman as Hillman
- Michael St. John Smith as Senator Booth

== Reception ==
The film has been criticised for having a low-budget feel, and there were plans to develop it for TV.
