= The Columbia Singles Collection, Vol. 1 =

Compilation album by Jo Stafford
- Released: February 17, 2004
- Genre: Traditional pop
- Label: Corinthian Records

Professional ratings
Review scores
Source	Rating
Allmusic	4.5/5 stars

'The Columbia Singles Collection, Vol. 1' is a compilation album of songs recorded by American singer Jo Stafford during her time at Columbia Records. This album was released by Corinthian Records, the company founded by Stafford and her husband, Paul Weston, on February 17, 2004.

== Track listing ==
1. Blackout the Moon
2. "Love Is Here to Stay"
3. Handsome Stranger
4. Someone's Been Readin My Mail
5. "Suddenly There's a Valley" - 1955
6. Smoking My Sad Cigarette
7. The Dixieland Band
8. A Perfect Love
9. "Indoor Sport" - 1960
10. Use Your Imagination
11. Lovely Is the Evening
12. How Can We Say Goodbye
13. Big D
14. Once to Every Heart
15. "I'll Be There" - 1957
16. "Wouldn't It Be Loverly"
17. Along the Colorado Trail
18. I Got a Sweetie
19. Goodnight Pillow
20. Hawaiian War Chant
21. Just Another Polka
22. Bells Are Ringing
23. "All Yours" - 1959
24. It's Never Quite the Same
25. "I'm in the Mood for Love"
