= Kagagi =

- Promotional image
- Genre: Action-adventure; Science fantasy Superhero
- Based on: Kagagi: The Raven, by Jay Odjick
- Written by: Jay Odjick
- Directed by: Sean Patrick O'Reilly
- Voices of: Algonquin: River Tanasco; Jay Odjick; Stephanie Tenasco; English: Eric Wilson; Jean Francois Lovenge; Gracie Dove; Tyler Nicol
- Opening theme: "Electric PowWow Drum" by A Tribe Called Red
- Ending theme: "Electric PowWow Drum" (instrumental)
- Composers: Lance Cote; A Tribe Called Red; Kevin Macleod
- Country of origin: Canada
- Original languages: Algonquin; English
- No. of seasons: 1
- No. of episodes: 13

Production
- Executive producers: Jay Odjick; Sean Patrick O'Reilly
- Producer: Michele O'Reilly
- Running time: 22 minutes
- Production companies: Arcana Studio; Animation Engine

Original release
- Network: APTN
- Release: October 5 – December 28, 2014

Kagagi (stylized K^{A}G^{A}G^{I}, also called Kagagi: The Raven) is a Canadian CG-animated television series produced by Arcana Studio. Inspired by Jay Odjick's comic book series of the same name, Kagagi premiered on APTN Kids on October 5, 2014.

== Characters and cast ==
During the end credits, images of the characters appear on the left spinning in place with their names underneath them, making it easy to discern who they are.

The following are the characters of Kagagi along with their voice actors (Algonquin-language, then English-language).

- Matthew Carver (voiced by Eric Wilson) — the teen boy who transforms into Kagagi
- Tommy Wetzel (voiced by Jay Odjick and Jean Francois Lovenge) — Matt's friend
- Cassie Shannon (voiced by Stephanie Tenasco and Gracie Dove) — Matt's love interest
- Wisakedjak (voiced by Crazy Horse Commonda and Ron Dean Harris) — Matt's mentor, the former Kagagi
- Nigig (voiced by Fred McGregor and Dustin Elkin) — a pygmy helper of Jak
- Eric Kavanaugh (voiced by Joel Odjick and Jack Anderson) — the school bully
- Janet Carver (voiced by Annette Smith and Linsey Willier) — Matt's mom
- Brute (voiced by Jay Odjick and Nathan Wales) — a muscular villain
- Appolyon (voiced by Jay Odjick and Dan Zachary)
- Mr. Keeper (voiced by Charlie Morin and Kelvin Redvers)
- Philosopher Rex (voiced by Jay Odjick and Cole Vigue)
- Jas (voiced by Craig Commonda and Dan Zachary)
- Claw (voiced by Cezin Nottaway and Kaylynn Taylor)
- Kade (voiced by Jay Odjick and Cole Vigue)
- Tori Isaacs (voiced by Misty Whiteduck and Willa-Lee Reid) — helps Matt.
- Kore (voiced by Craig Commonda and Dan Zachary)
- Candace Crow (voiced by Wanda Thusky and Willa-Lee Reid)
- Warrior Spirit (voiced by Wesley Tenasco and Gino Odjick)
- Captive Spirit (voiced by Cezin Nottaway and Kaylynn Taylor)
- Minion (voiced by Fred McGregor and Jack Anderson)
- Pagwoudj Inini (voiced by Wesley Tenasco and Michael Billy)
- Windigo (voiced by Jay Odjick and Tyler Nicol) — the main villain
- Cashier (voiced by David Burke in English; not credited in Algonquin)

== Music ==
The opening theme is "Electric PowWow Drum", native warrior music by A Tribe Called Red. Other various tracks from the group are used throughout the series. Other library music came from Kevin Macleod. Original music for the show was composed by Lance Cote.

== Episodes ==
No.	Title	Original release date
1	"Origins Part One"	5 October 2014
2	"Origins Part Two"	12 October 2014
3	"Bleeding Hearts"	19 October 2014
4	"Rite of Passage"	26 October 2014
5	"The Intrinsic"	2 November 2014
6	"Omega Stone"	9 November 2014
7	"Changes"	16 November 2014
8	"Appolyon"	23 November 2014
9	"The Return"	30 November 2014
10	"Night Terrors"	7 December 2014
11	"Taking Risks"	14 December 2014
12	"The Calm"	21 December 2014
13	"The Storm"	28 December 2014

== Release ==
Kagagi premiered on APTN Kids on October 5, 2014. On November 1, 2015, the series began airing in the United States on First Nations Experience. In Australia, the show debuted on NITV in June 2016.
