= All Yours (2016 film) =

Television film produced by and starring Nicollette Sheridan

- Promotional release poster
- Genre: Romantic comedy
- Teleplay by: Brian Sawyer; Gregg Rossen; Ari Posner
- Story by: Brian Sawyer; Gregg Rossen
- Directed by: Monika Mitchell
- Starring: Nicollette Sheridan; Dan Payne; Jayne Eastwood; Kiefer O'Reilly; Genea Charpentier; Lochlyn Munro; Mark Brandon; Michael Kopsa
- Music by: Hal Beckett
- Country of origin: United States
- Original language: English

Production
- Executive producers: Shawn Williamson; Jamie Goehring; Alexandre Coscas; Francisco J. Gonzalez; Nicollette Sheridan
- Producer: Kevin Leslie
- Cinematography: Toby Gorman
- Editor: Christopher A. Smith
- Running time: 86 minutes
- Production companies: Lighthouse Pictures; Storybox Entertainment

Original release
- Network: Hallmark Channel
- Release: April 2, 2016

All Yours is a 2016 American made-for-television romantic comedy film starring Nicollette Sheridan and Dan Payne. The film was directed by Monika Mitchell, written by Brian Sawyer, Gregg Rossen and Ari Posner, and executive-produced by Shawn Williamson, Jamie Goehring, Alexandre Coscas, Francisco J. Gonzalez, and Nicollette Sheridan. The film premiered on Hallmark Channel on April 2, 2016.

== Plot ==
When Cass McKay (Nicollette Sheridan), a single mother and high powered attorney, hires Matthew Walker (Dan Payne), a family friend, as a nanny out of desperation, she realizes she's missing something in life and needs to take a chance on love.

== Cast ==
- Nicollette Sheridan as Cass McKay
- Dan Payne as Matthew Walker
- Jayne Eastwood as Vivian, Cass's mother
- Kiefer O'Reilly as Quinn McKay, Cass's son
- Genea Charpentier as Emma McKay, Cass's daughter
- Lochlyn Munro as Henry
- Mark Brandon as Vincent
- Michael Kopsa as Charles Walker, Matthew's father
- Donavon Stinson as Adam
- Karen Holness as Winnie
- Brooks Darnell as Benji
- Charles Raahul Singh as Howard
- Janet Glassford as Nanny Doris
- Rob Morton as Woody

== Production ==
The film was directed by Monika Mitchell, written by Ari Posner and Gregg Rossen, and stars Nicollette Sheridan, who also serves as an executive producer alongside Alexandre Coscas, Francisco J. Gonzalez, and Shawn Williamson. In an interview with Home & Family, Sheridan stated that the idea was brought to her by a male producer who was also having a hard time finding childcare for his children, stating that most of the women were busy and married, and most of the single men were the only ones available for babysitting. "I'd have to say [Cass] is probably one of the closest characters to myself that I've ever played," Sheridan told New York Live, "Very A-type personality, likes to be in control, very methodical, likes things in their place and, yeah, she's very structured."

Filming took place in Vancouver, British Columbia, Canada, from January 29, 2016, to February 19, 2016. Filming locations included Kensington Prairie Farm and the Vancouver Art Gallery.

In a behind the scenes look at the making of All Yours, Dan Payne stated his belief that the film will speak to people, "because it's about reminding you that anything in life that is affecting you [...] at the end of the day, you have a beautiful unit called a family that you can always rely on. Everything else, it comes and goes, but family is there forever."

== Release ==
On April 2, 2016, All Yours premiered on Hallmark Channel and was watched by 2.21 million viewers.
