= Noah Schnapp =

American actor (born 2004)

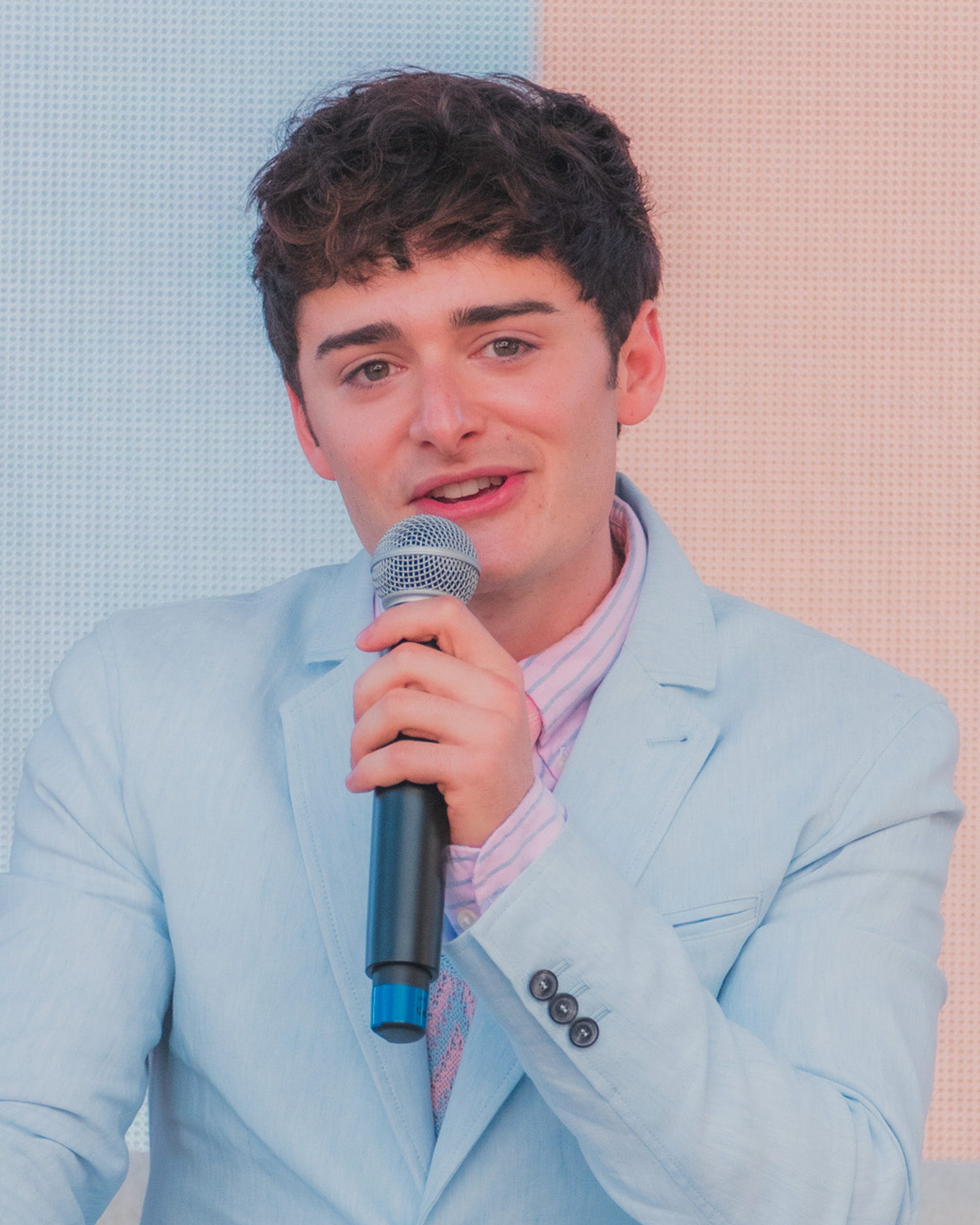
- Schnapp in 2025
- Born: Noah Cameron Schnapp; October 3, 2004 (age 22); New York City, U.S.
- Citizenship: United States; Canada
- Education: University of Pennsylvania (BA)
- Occupation: Actor
- Years active: 2014–present
- Known for: Stranger Things

Noah Cameron Schnapp (born October 3, 2004) is an American actor. He made his acting debut in 2015 with his portrayal of Charlie Brown in the animated film The Peanuts Movie and his supporting role in Steven Spielberg's Bridge of Spies. Schnapp gained international recognition for his role as Will Byers in the Netflix science fiction horror series Stranger Things (2016–2025), for which he received various accolades.

== Early life ==
Noah Cameron Schnapp was born in New York City to Mitchell and Karine Schnapp (née Perez), who are both originally from Montreal, Canada. He was raised in Scarsdale, New York, along with his twin sister, Chloe. He holds both U.S. and Canadian citizenship. Schnapp is Jewish and held his bar mitzvah in Israel. His mother is of Moroccan Jewish descent.

Schnapp was inspired to pursue acting at age 5 after seeing the Broadway production of Annie. He performed acting roles in school and community plays. When he was 8, his acting teacher suggested he attempt a professional career. Schnapp's parents registered him for an acting program at Star Kidz in Westchester, where he was guided by coach Alyson Isbrandtsen. It was under her guidance that he was subsequently introduced to MKS&D Talent Management, which opened up avenues for his career.

== Career ==
=== 2014–2015: Beginnings ===
Schnapp's professional acting career began when he voiced the lead character, Charlie Brown, in the animated film The Peanuts Movie in 2015. That same year, he made his film debut in the historical drama Bridge of Spies, directed by Steven Spielberg. He played Roger Donovan, the son of character James B. Donovan.

=== 2016–present: Stranger Things and breakthrough ===
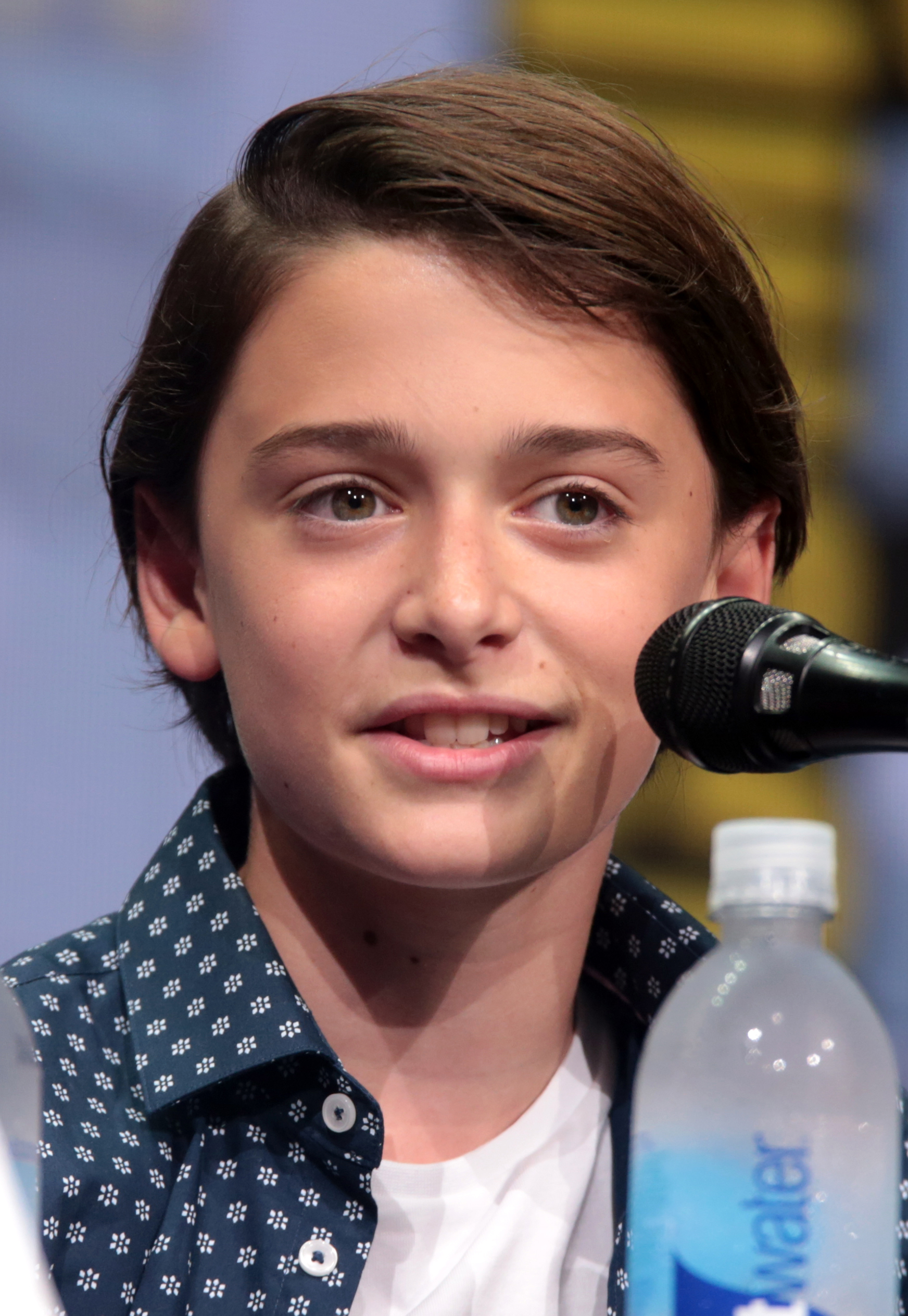
Schnapp at the 2017 San Diego Comic-Con

His breakthrough came in July 2016, when he began starring as Will Byers in the Netflix science fiction horror television series Stranger Things. Schnapp initially auditioned for the role of Mike Wheeler, another key character in the series, but was selected to play Will Byers. He was promoted to series regular for the second season, which premiered on October 27, 2017. In 2022, Schnapp confirmed that his character is gay. Schnapp's portrayal of Will has earned him critical praise.

In 2016, Schnapp was featured in Panic! at the Disco's music video for their song "LA Devotee", and performed on stage with the band at Madison Square Garden in March 2017. In 2018, Schnapp played the son of a street artist in a short film called The Circle, set during the Great Depression. Schnapp also appeared in We Only Know So Much (2018), a film that follows a multigenerational family. His voice acting continued in the animated film The Legend of Hallowaiian (2018) as the voice of Kai.

Schnapp also starred in independent films like Abe (2019) and Waiting for Anya (2020). He appeared in the 2020 Halloween comedy film Hubie Halloween, a Netflix production where he played a character named Tommy. In April 2022, Schnapp joined the cast of the psychological thriller film The Tutor (2023) as Jackson, a troubled teenager. He also voiced the character of Charlie Brown for the video game The Peanuts Movie: Snoopy's Grand Adventure.

In August 2026, Schnapp was announced for his stage debut in Affluenza, a play written and directed by Andy Sandberg, opening the 2026–27 mainstage season at Riverside Studios in London on September 26, 2026. Inspired by real events surrounding a contested legal defense in the United States and set among the wealthy of the Hamptons, the play follows the aftermath of a teenager's drunk-driving crash; Schnapp plays two roles. Janette Manrara, Rupert Young, Juliet Cowan and Wallis Currie-Wood joined the cast the following week.

In September 2026, it was announced that Schnapp is set to star in an upcoming thriller directed by Carlos V. Gutierrez titled Stealing From Pablo. Schnapp is also an executive producer on the film.

== Other ventures ==
In 2019, Schnapp launched a YouTube channel under his own name. Active for a year and a half, he primarily created vlogs and lifestyle videos. As of June 2022, the channel has 4.2 million subscribers and has gained 110 million views.

In November 2021, he launched To Be Honest (TBH), a sustainability-focused snacking company he co-founded with Elena Guberman and Ba Minuzzi. In November 2022, Schnapp announced a crowdfunding campaign for this venture on the Republic platform that aimed to raise a maximum amount of $1.235 million at a $15 million valuation cap. In 2023, he launched TenderFix, a delivery-only virtual restaurant brand operated by IHOP with a menu of chicken tenders.

Schnapp also worked as a lifeguard, a job he took on during his summer break before college.

== Personal life ==
Schnapp attended the Wharton School of the University of Pennsylvania, majoring in entrepreneurship and innovation. He graduated with a Bachelor of Arts degree in cinema and media studies in 2026.

Schnapp publicly came out as gay in a video posted to his TikTok account on January 5, 2023. The video saw him express relief that family and friends had accepted his coming out, and he quipped in the video's caption, "I guess I'm more similar to Will [Byers] than I thought", a reference to his statement about his Stranger Things character also being gay. He is the godparent of the adopted child of his Stranger Things co-star Millie Bobby Brown and her husband Jake Bongiovi.

At the start of the Gaza war, Schnapp publicly condemned the October 7 attacks and those celebrating it. A month after the attacks, a video circulated on social media showing him sitting with people who were handing out "Zionism is sexy" and "Hamas is ISIS" stickers, leading some fans to demand his removal from the cast of Stranger Things and to threaten to boycott the show's fifth and final season. In January 2024, he posted a TikTok video advocating for "peace for both sides" and asking for "understanding and compassion", stating that his thoughts and beliefs on the war had been misconstrued.

During a 2023 visit to Jerusalem, Schnapp laid tefillin at the Western Wall.

== Filmography ==
=== Film ===
Year	Title	Role	Notes	Refs.
2015	Bridge of Spies	Roger Donovan		
2015	The Peanuts Movie	Charlie Brown	Voice role	
2016	The Circle	Lucas	Short film	
2018	The Legend of Hallowaiian	Kai	Voice role	
2018	We Only Know So Much	Otis Copeland		
2020	Abe	Abe		
2020	Hubie Halloween	Tommy		
2020	Waiting for Anya	Jo		
2021	Who Are You, Charlie Brown?	Himself	Documentary	
2023	The Tutor	Jackson		

=== Television ===
Year	Title	Role	Notes	Refs.
2016–2025	Stranger Things	Will Byers	Recurring role (season 1); main role (season 2–5)	
2017	Lip Sync Battle	Himself	Episode: "The Cast of Stranger Things"	
2018	Liza on Demand	Evan / Trevor	2 episodes	
2021	Stranger Sharks	Himself	TV special (Shark Week)	

=== Music videos ===
Year	Title	Artist	Refs.
2016	"LA Devotee"	Panic! at the Disco	
2018	"In My Feelings"	Drake	
2020	"See You"	Johnny Orlando	

=== Theater ===
Year	Title	Role	Venue	Refs.
2026	Affluenza	Dylan/Todd	Riverside Studios	

== Awards and nominations ==
Award	Year	Category	Work	Result	Ref.
Critics Choice LGBTQ+ Awards	2026	Breakthrough Performance Award	Stranger Things	Won	
MTV Movie & TV Awards	2018	Best Frightened Performance	Stranger Things	Won	
MTV Movie & TV Awards	2018	Best On-Screen Team	Stranger Things	Nominated	
People's Choice Awards	2022	Male TV Star of 2022	—	Won	
Queerty Awards	2023	Closet Door Bustdown	—	Won	
Saturn Awards	2026	Best Performance by a Younger Actor in a Television Series	Stranger Things	Nominated	
Screen Actors Guild Awards	2017	Outstanding Performance by an Ensemble in a Drama Series	Stranger Things	Won	
Screen Actors Guild Awards	2018	Outstanding Performance by an Ensemble in a Drama Series	Stranger Things	Nominated	
Screen Actors Guild Awards	2020	Outstanding Performance by an Ensemble in a Drama Series	Stranger Things	Nominated	
Teen Choice Awards	2019	Choice Summer TV Actor	—	Won	
Young Artist Awards	2017	Best Performance in a Digital TV Series or Film – Young Actor	Stranger Things	Nominated	
