= Bart Thompson =

American comic artist

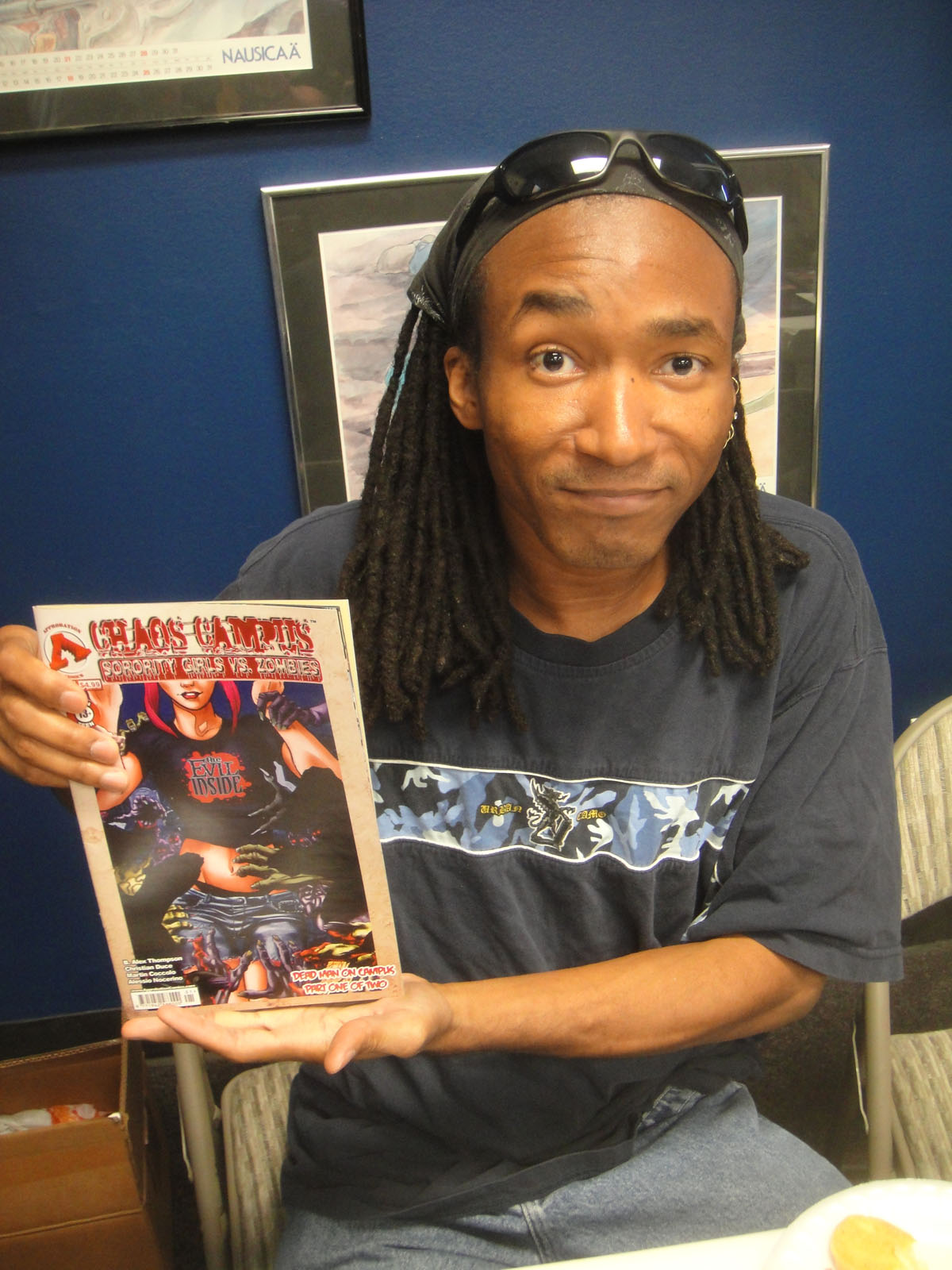
- Bart Thompson at the 2012 Free Comic Book Day
- Born: Bart Alexander Thompson Los Angeles, California, U.S.
- Areas: Writer, Publisher, Letterer
- Pseudonyms: Alex Thompson, B. Alex Thompson, Bart A. Thompson
- Notable works: Lethal Instinct

Bart Alexander Thompson is the creator of the comic book company Approbation Comics, and is the creator, writer, and artist of titles such as Vampires Unlimited, the Metamutoids, ChiSai, The Lazarus Factor, Chaos Campus, and Weapons of Mass Destruction. Thompson is the scripter for the first volume of the comic book Lethal Instinct for Alias Enterprises and the writer for the remainder of the series. Thompson also writes and edits the series Blood, Shells, & Roses for Arcana Studios.

Thompson is also credited as Alex Thompson, Bart A. Thompson (usually in print form), and B. Alex Thompson (a movie credits).

== Bibliography ==
=== Chaos Campus ===
Chaos Campus: Sorority Girls vs. Zombies is a comedy/pop culture parody series where zombies have taken over a city and the only hope humanity has for survival lies within the hands of the three sorority sisters- Jamie, Paige, and Brittany. Thompson came up with the concept via "joking around with friends, laughing at all of the 'blank versus blank' movies that were starting to become popular, and knowing Hollywood will take a decent selling idea and run it into the ground (like natural disaster movies, buddy comedies, and now comic movies and 70's/80's TV). ...we had a game of how adding 'zombies' to any known property would make it even better. Like Married with Children could be 'Married with Zombies' or 'Zombies with Children'... and so on". The idea stayed with Thompson until he wrote a one-shot that eventually developed into an ongoing series.

Chaos Campus is planned to be a sixty issue story split into three 20-issue acts. So far only the first 20 issues have been released, completing Act 1. Thompson also has plans for a movie adaptation of the series.
