= Dan Payne =

Canadian actor (born 1972)

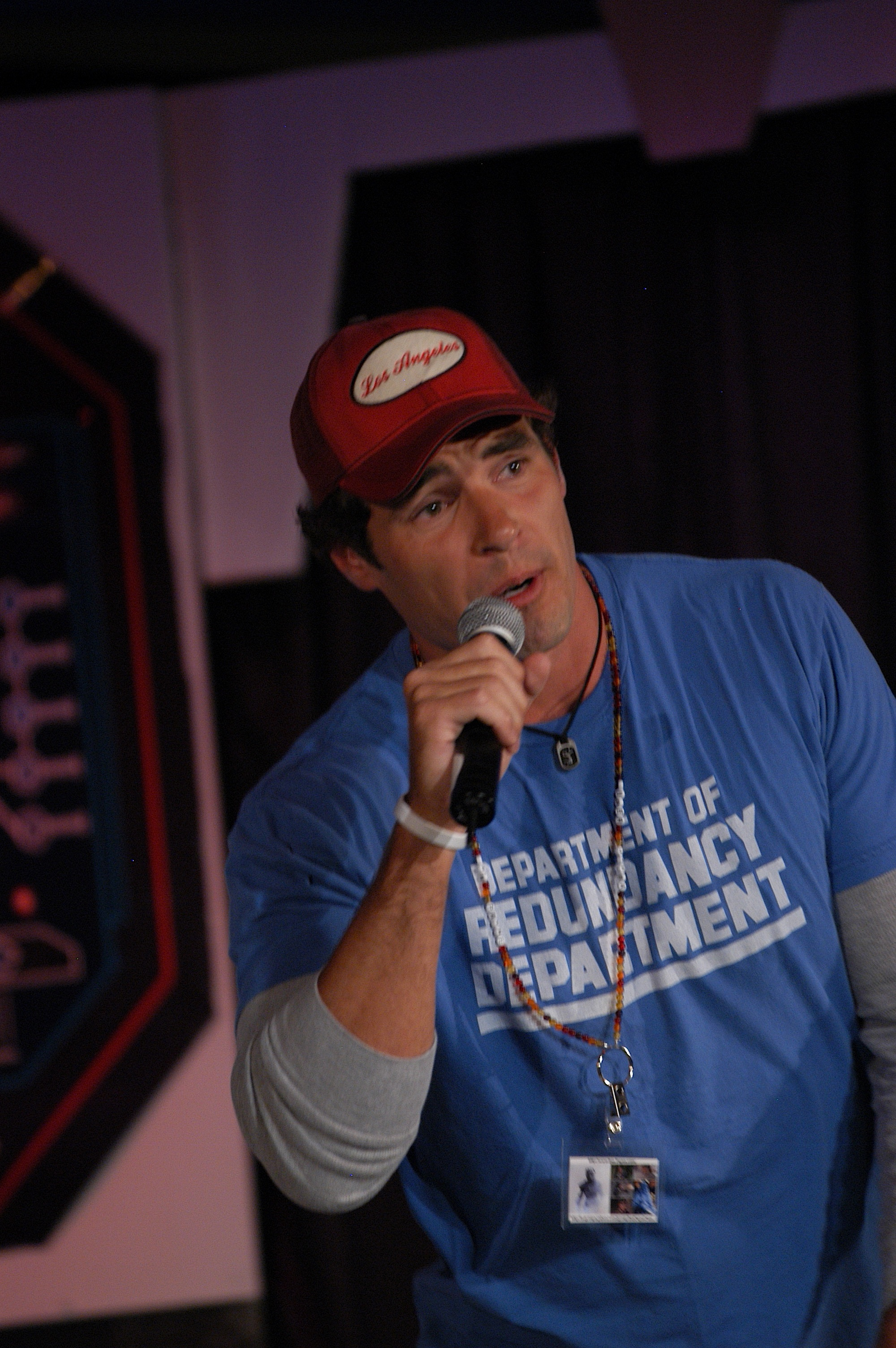
- Payne in 2005
- Born: August 4, 1972 (age 54); Victoria, British Columbia, Canada
- Occupation: Actor
- Years active: 2001–present
- Height: 6 ft 4 in (193 cm)
- Spouse: Daylon Payne
- Children: 2

Daniel Payne (born August 4, 1972) is a Canadian actor best known for playing the role of John in the television series Alice, I Think.

== Career ==
In his early 20s, Payne was a professional volleyball player. After his retirement, he was convinced by his brother Josh to move to Australia, where Josh was already living. Dan began his acting career by creating short films with his brother.

Payne then moved to the United Kingdom, where he supported himself playing, in his words, "the big, dumb American" in various British films and TV shows. He moved to Vancouver in 2001.

Payne had numerous roles on the 2002–2005 science fiction series Stargate SG-1, and its 2004-2009 spin-off series Stargate Atlantis, both shot in Vancouver; these included Kull Warriors and an Ashrak assassin on Stargate SG-1, and the Wraith king in the Stargate Atlantis episode "Sateda". Payne appeared as Nathan Davidson, a married, sexually repressed father in the 2008 film Mulligans, a role of which Payne stated in 2016, "It is still one of my proudest efforts". He also appeared as Dollar Bill in Watchmen (2009).

Payne starred as Cesar Divine in the web based television series Divine:The Series that stretched four episodes.

Payne has starring roles in Hallmark Channel's 2016 movies All Yours, with Nicollette Sheridan and A Time To Dance, with Jennie Garth. Payne also landed a recurring role on Good Witch.

== Filmography ==
=== Film ===
Year	Title	Role	Notes
2002	Cover Story	Uniformed Cop	
2006	Truth	Rick Moore	Direct-to-video
2006	LovecraCked! The Movie	Mark	
2006	John Tucker Must Die	Skip #6	
2007	Will of the Wisp	Husband	Short film
2007	Unbearable Love	Walter	Short film
2007	Taming Tammy	Bill	
2008	Mulligans	Nathan Davidson	
2008	The Auburn Hills Breakdown	Dan	Short film
2009	Smile of April	Adrian	
2009	Watchmen	Dollar Bill	
2009	Under the Hood	Dollar Bill	Direct-to-video
2009	Driven to Kill	Sergei	Direct-to-video
2010	Icarus	Dave	
2010	Transparency	Pollard	
2010	Blood: A Butcher's Tale	Victor	
2011	Trash	Gary	Short film
2011	Last Christmas	Dad	Short film
2012	The Cabin in the Woods	Mathew Buckner	
2012	Hiding	Noah Carter	Direct-to-video
2012	Underworld: Awakening	Lycan Creature #2	
2012	Christmas Miracle	Joseph Wells	
2012	A Christmas Story 2	Ensign Payne	Direct-to-video
2012	Charlie	Sally	
2013	Leap 4 Your Life	Henry	
2013	No Clue	Church	
2016	Warcraft	Clansmen	
2016	Star Trek Beyond	Wadjet	
2018	The Steam Engines of Oz	Blackburn	Voice role
2022	Corrective Measures	Payback	

=== Television ===
Year	Title	Role	Notes
2001	MythQuest	Osiris	Episode: "Isis & Osiris: Part 1"
2002	It's a Very Merry Muppet Christmas Movie	Handsome Executive	TV movie
2002	Snow Queen	Various	TV movie
2002–2005	Stargate SG-1	Various	13 episodes
2003	A Screwball Homicide		TV movie
2003	Another Country	Cop #2	TV movie
2003	Just Cause	Chris	Episode: "Lies, Speculation & Deception"
2003	Smallville	Lexcorp Airport Security	Episodes: "Exodus", "Phoenix"
2004	Pryor Offenses	Randall	TV movie
2004	The L Word	Policeman	Episode: "Pilot"
2004	Stargate Atlantis	Wraith Warrior	Episode: "Rising"
2004	Dead Like Me	Walter	Episode: "Ashes to Ashes"
2005	The Muppets' Wizard of Oz	Weatherman	TV movie
2005	Stargate Atlantis	Lt. Reed	Episode: "Runner"
2006	Stargate Atlantis	Big Wraith / Super Soldier	Episodes: "Sateda", "Phantoms"
2006	Saved	Jonathan Locker	Episode: "Who Do You Trust?"
2006	Whistler	Colin	Episode: "Gathering Clouds"
2006	Alice, I Think	John MacLeod	13 episodes
2007	Sanctuary	Monster on TV / Corporate Vampire	Episodes: "1.1", "1.8"
2007	Tin Man	Longcoat Leader	TV miniseries
2008	The Triple Eight	Handsome Boyfriend (uncredited)	Episode: "Cat in a Hot Tin Box"
2008	Stargate Atlantis	Male Wraith (uncredited)	Episode: "Spoils of War"
2008	Robson Arms	Richard	Episode: "Positivity"
2008	The Secret Lives of Second Wives	Alex	TV movie
2009	Battlestar Galactica	Sean Ellison	Episode: "Daybreak: Part 2"
2009	Health Nutz	Walter Schultz	TV movie
2010	Human Target	Foster Larouche	Episode: "Corner Man"
2010	A Family Thanksgiving	Bill	Hallmark Movie
2010	Tower Prep	Coach	7 episodes
2011	Fairly Legal	Nick Grunyan	Episode: "Believers"
2011	Om Inc.	Rash Customer	TV series
2011	Divine: The Series	Cesar Divine	4 episodes
2011–2012	R. L. Stine's The Haunting Hour: The Series	Various	Recurring role
2013	The Hunters	Carter Flynn	TV movie
2014	Supernatural	Abner	Episode: "Road Trip"
2014	Once Upon a Time in Wonderland	Captain of the Guard	Episode: "To Catch a Thief"
2015	Descendants	King Beast	Disney Channel Original Movie
2015	Aurora Teagarden Mysteries	Torrance	Hallmark Movies & Mysteries
2016	All Yours	Matthew Walker	Hallmark Movie
2016	A Time to Dance	John Reynolds	Hallmark Movie
2016	Good Witch	John Dover/Recurring Role	Hallmark Channel series; season 2
2016	Legends of Tomorrow	Obsidian	Episode: "The Justice Society of America"
2017	Descendants 2	King Beast	Disney Channel Original Movie
2017	Mech-X4	Traeger	Season 2
2018	Once Upon a Time	Ivo	Episode "Chosen"
2019	Descendants 3	King Beast	Disney Channel Original Movie
2019	The Flash	Shay Lamden	Episode: "King Shark vs. Gorilla Grodd"
2019	Gabby Duran & the Unsittables	Bruce	Episode: "It's Christmas, Gabby Duran!"
2020	Christmas She Wrote	Dan	Hallmark Movie
2020	Matchmaker Mysteries: A Fatal Romance	Ethan Plume	Hallmark Movie
2021	Framed By My Husband	Rick Lowe	TV movie
2021	Journey of My Heart	Davis Bell	Hallmark Movie
2022	Scented with Love	Ted	TV movie
2022	Christmas on Candy Cane Lane	Rob	TV movie
2023	Fourth Down and Love	Jimmy Hanson	TV movie
2023	Christmas at the Chalet	Charles	TV movie
2023	How To Fall In Love By Christmas	Jack	TV movie
2025	Percy Jackson and the Olympians	Marrow Sucker	2 episodes
2026	Remarkably Bright Creatures	Adam Wright	Netflix movie
