= Howard Lovecraft and the Frozen Kingdom =

- Blu-ray cover
- Directed by: Sean Patrick O'Reilly
- Written by: Sean Patrick O'Reilly
- Produced by: Sean Patrick O'Reilly; Michelle O'Reilly
- Starring: Ron Perlman; Christopher Plummer; Jane Curtin; Doug Bradley; Scott McNeil
- Edited by: Brendan Hansell
- Music by: George Streicher
- Production company: Arcana Studio
- Distributed by: Shout! Factory
- Release date: October 2016
- Running time: 83 minutes
- Country: Canada
- Language: English
- Box office: $27,833

Howard Lovecraft and the Frozen Kingdom is a 2016 animated film based on the graphic novel of the same name, itself inspired by the writings of American horror author H. P. Lovecraft. Two sequels, Howard Lovecraft and the Undersea Kingdom and Howard Lovecraft and the Kingdom of Madness, were released in 2017 and 2018.

== Plot ==
After visiting his father in Arkham Sanitarium, Howard Lovecraft accidentally uses the Necronomicon to open a portal to a world filled with creatures and an adventure.

== Cast ==
- Ron Perlman as Shoggoth
- Christopher Plummer as Dr. Jeffrey West
- Jane Curtin as Algid Bunk
- Doug Bradley as Nyarlathotep
- Scott McNeil as Barry / Govlins
- Alison Wandzura as Mary Lovecraft
- Kiefer O'Reilly as Howard Lovecraft
- Harmony O'Reilly as Innes
- Michelle O'Reilly as Sarah Lovecraft
- Phoenix O'Reilly as Twi'i
- Sean Patrick O'Reilly as Spot
- Summer O'Reilly as Gotha
- Tyler Nicol as Winfield Lovecraft

== Overview ==
The Howard Lovecraft series is a trilogy of graphic novels written by Bruce Brown and illustrated by Renzo Podesta. that began publishing in 2009 with Howard Lovecraft and The Frozen Kingdom. The sequel Howard Lovecraft & The Undersea Kingdom was published in 2011 and the third volume Howard Lovecraft & The Kingdom of Madness was published in 2013. In 2014, Howard Lovecraft & The Three Kingdoms was released, printing the three series in one hardcover book. The books derived their world and characters from the Cthulhu Mythos created by Lovecraft.

Howard Lovecraft and the Frozen Kingdom is the first screen adaptation of the Howard Lovecraft series. Two sequels, Howard Lovecraft and the Undersea Kingdom and Howard Lovecraft and the Kingdom of Madness, were released in 2017 and 2019.

== Production ==
On March 22, 2016, it was announced that Ron Perlman and Christopher Plummer had been cast in an upcoming animated feature. Shout! Factory has acquired the distribution rights to the film and Howard Lovecraft series.
