= Howard Lovecraft and the Kingdom of Madness =

- Directed by: Sean Patrick O'Reilly
- Written by: Sean Patrick O'Reilly
- Produced by: Sean Patrick O'Reilly Michelle O'Reilly
- Starring: Christopher Plummer; Mark Hamill; Scott McNeil; Jeffrey Combs; Finn Wolfhard; Doug Bradley
- Edited by: Chris Trinh
- Music by: George Streicher
- Production company: Arcana Studio
- Distributed by: Shout! Factory
- Release date: December 4, 2018
- Running time: 75 minutes
- Country: Canada
- Language: English

Howard Lovecraft and the Kingdom of Madness is a 2018 Canadian animated film written, directed and produced by Sean Patrick O'Reilly. It is the sequel to 2016 and 2017 films Howard Lovecraft and the Frozen Kingdom and Howard Lovecraft and the Undersea Kingdom, while the trilogy is based on the work of American horror author H. P. Lovecraft.

== Plot ==
After the events that occurred in the Frozen Kingdom and the Undersea Kingdom, young Howard finds himself at home. The walls of reality are thinning making the world vulnerable to dangers from beyond. Howard follows his father, Uncle Randolph and Dr. Henry Armitage as they journey to Antarctica, to prevent the awakening of the destroyer of worlds, Cthulhu.

== Development ==
Shout! Factory announced their title releases at SDCC '18, which included Howard Lovecraft and the Kingdom of Madness. The Howard Lovecraft series is based on the graphic novel written by Bruce Brown. In an interview with WIRED, the author stated his inspiration came from the writings of American horror author H. P. Lovecraft as well as many of the character and setting names. This is the third and last installment of the trilogy. The final film in the series brings out Cthulhu, as foreshadowed in the previous installments.

== Cast ==
- Christopher Plummer as Dr. Jeffrey West
- Mark Hamill as Dr. Henry Armitage
- Kiefer O'Reilly as Howard Lovecraft
- Finn Wolfhard as Herbert West
- Nick Wolfhard as William Dyer
- Vijay Vaibhav Saini as Professor Jaswant Atwood
- Jeffrey Combs as Randolph Lovecraft
- Doug Bradley as Nyarlathotep
- Scott McNeil as Hamish Rice
- Sean Patrick O'Reilly as Spot / Cthulhu
- Ashleigh Ball as Ellen Ellery
- Tyler Nicol as Winfield Lovecraft
- Allison Wandzura as Mary Lovecraft
- Harmony O'Reilly as Innes
- Michelle O'Reilly as Sarah Lovecraft
- Phoenix O'Reilly as Twi'i
- Summer O'Reilly as Gotha

== Release ==
The film was released on December 4, 2018.

=== Home media ===
Howard Lovecraft and the Kingdom of Madness was released on DVD and Blu-ray on December 4, 2018 by Shout! Factory which is part of their three feature distribution deal with Arcana Studio.
