= Howard Lovecraft and the Undersea Kingdom =

- Directed by: Sean Patrick O'Reilly
- Written by: Sean Patrick O'Reilly
- Produced by: Sean Patrick O'Reilly Michelle O'Reilly
- Starring: Christopher Plummer; Mark Hamill; Scott McNeil; Jeffrey Combs; Ron Perlman
- Edited by: Chris Trinh
- Music by: George Streicher
- Production company: Arcana Studio
- Distributed by: Shout! Factory
- Release date: October 1, 2017
- Running time: 89 minutes
- Country: Canada
- Language: English

Howard Lovecraft and the Undersea Kingdom is a 2017 animated direct-to-video film based on the graphic novel of the same name. The film is inspired by the writings of American horror author H. P. Lovecraft. The sequel to the 2016 film Howard Lovecraft and the Frozen Kingdom, the film was followed by Howard Lovecraft and the Kingdom of Madness in 2018.

== Plot ==
After the events of the Frozen Kingdom, Howard Lovecraft is now home.

A terrible curse is placed upon his loved ones and he must travel to the Undersea Kingdom in order to free his mother who has been captured by an old foe. On his quest he gains help from Dr. Armitage, his father Winfield, and his best friend Spot.

== Production ==
On January 18, 2017, it was announced that Mark Hamill, Christopher Plummer and Jeffrey Combs and Doug Bradley would be joining the voice cast in this animated feature. Hamill was cast as Dr. Henry Armitage while Plummer, Ron Perlman, and Bradley reprise their respective roles as Dr. Herbert West, Shoggoth, and Nyarlathotep.

Shout! Factory had acquired the distribution rights to the series including theatrical, digital, broadcast, home entertainment.

== Cast ==
- Christopher Plummer as Dr. West
- Mark Hamill as Dr. Henry Armitage
- Kiefer O'Reilly as Howard Lovecraft
- Jeffrey Combs as King Abdul
- Ron Perlman as Shoggoth
- Scott McNeil as Dagon / Govlins
- Doug Bradley as Nyarlathotep
- Sean Patrick O'Reilly as Spot
- Harmony O'Reilly as Innes
- Michelle O'Reilly as Sarah Lovecraft
- Phoenix O'Reilly as Twi'i
- Summer O'Reilly as Gotha
- Tyler Nicol as Winfield Lovecraft

== Release ==
The film was released on October 1, 2017.

It also was screened at H.P. Lovecraft Film Festival in Oregon, FearNYC Film Festival and Hot Springs International Horror Film Festival.

=== Home media ===
Howard Lovecraft and the Undersea Kingdom was released on DVD and Blu-ray on December 5, 2017 by Shout! Factory as part of the company's three-feature distribution deal with Arcana Studio.

== Reception ==
=== Critical response ===
Rotten Tomatoes has an approval rating of 40% and it has a weighted average vote of 7.5/10 out of 392 votes on IMDb.

Critics says "Howard Lovecraft and the Undersea Kingdom does a lot of things right; it's fun, packed with high adventure, and manages to soften the Lovecraft mythos to make it palatable to younger viewers (...) the story is muddy in some areas with a myriad of story points going on simultaneously over a rather short runtime". Fans and viewers of the film praised the voice talent of the movie but have criticized the quality of the animation.

== Accolades ==
The film took home Best in the Festival: Scifi at Hot Springs International Horror Film Festival and Best Director at FearNYC.
