= Christopher Plummer on screen and stage =

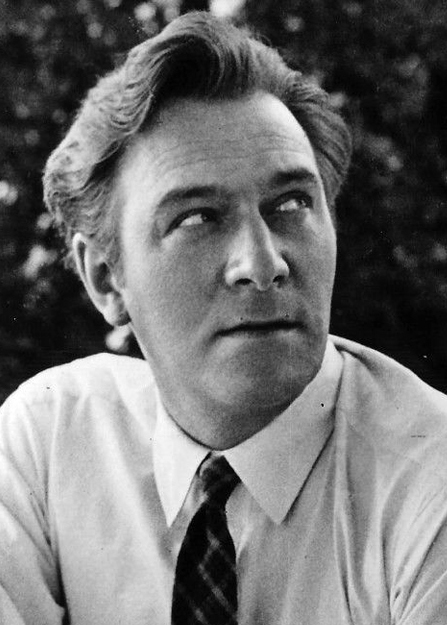
Plummer in 1964

Christopher Plummer (1929–2021) was a Canadian film, television and stage actor. On stage, Plummer's most notable roles were that of Cyrano de Bergerac in Cyrano (1974) and as John Barrymore in Barrymore. He won the Tony Award for Best Actor in a Play for these two roles. On film, Plummer is known for portraying Captain von Trapp in The Sound of Music (1965).

Plummer won an Academy Award for Best Supporting Actor for his performance in Mike Mills' film Beginners (2011). He also appeared in: The Fall of the Roman Empire (1964), Waterloo (1970), The Man Who Would Be King (1975), Malcolm X (1992) and A Beautiful Mind (2001). He portrayed journalist Mike Wallace in The Insider (1999), author Leo Tolstoy in The Last Station (2009), Arthur Case in Inside Man (2006), and J. Paul Getty in All the Money in the World (2017). Plummer had provided his voice for two animated films: the Don Bluth film An American Tail (1986) and the Pixar film Up (2009).

At the time of his death, he had been filming season 2 of Departure. He was originally set to play the lead in a film adaptation of King Lear to be filmed in summer 2021, but he died that February. He was replaced by Christopher Lloyd as a result.

== Film ==
Film credits
Year	Title	Role	Notes	Refs.
1958	Stage Struck	Joe Sheridan		
1958	Wind Across the Everglades	Walt Murdock		
1964	The Fall of the Roman Empire	Commodus		
1965	The Sound of Music	Captain Georg von Trapp		
1965	Inside Daisy Clover	Raymond Swan		
1966	Triple Cross	Eddie Chapman		
1967	The Night of the Generals	Field Marshal Erwin Rommel		
1967	Oedipus the King	Oedipus		
1968	Nobody Runs Forever	Sir James Quentin		
1969	Battle of Britain	Squadron Leader Colin Harvey		
1969	The Royal Hunt of the Sun	Atahualpa		
1969	Lock Up Your Daughters!	Lord Foppington		
1970	Waterloo	Arthur Wellesley, 1st Duke of Wellington		
1973	The Pyx	Sergeant Jim Henderson		
1974	The Happy Prince	The Happy Prince	Short film	
1975	The Spiral Staircase	Dr. Joe Sherman		
1975	The Return of the Pink Panther	Sir Charles Litton		
1975	Conduct Unbecoming	Major Alastair Wimbourne		
1975	The Man Who Would Be King	Rudyard Kipling		
1975	The Day That Shook the World	Archduke Franz Ferdinand of Austria		
1976	Aces High	Captain 'Uncle' Sinclair		
1977	The Assignment	Captain Behounek		
1977	The Disappearance	Deverell		
1978	The Silent Partner	Harry Reikle		
1978	International Velvet	John Seaton		
1979	Starcrash	The Emperor		
1979	Murder by Decree	Sherlock Holmes		
1979	Hanover Street	Paul Sellinger		
1980	Somewhere in Time	William Fawcett Robinson		
1981	Eyewitness	Joseph		
1981	The Amateur	Professor Lakos		
1984	Lily in Love	Fitzroy Wynn / Roberto Terranova		
1984	Dreamscape	Bob Blair		
1984	Highpoint	James Hatcher		
1984	Ordeal by Innocence	Leo Argyle		
1986	The Boy in Blue	Knox		
1986	The Boss' Wife	Mr. Roalvang		
1986	An American Tail	Henri	Voice	
1986	The Steadfast Tin Soldier	Narrator		
1986	Vampire in Venice	Professor Paris Catalano		
1987	Dragnet	Reverend Jonathan Whirley		
1987	I Love N.Y.	John Robertson Yeats		
1987	The Man Who Planted Trees	Narrator		
1987	The Gnomes' Great Adventure	Narrator		
1988	Light Years	Metamorphis		
1988	Shadow Dancing	Edmund Beaumont		
1988	The Making of a Legend: Gone with the Wind	Narrator	Documentary	
1989	Souvenir	Ernst Kestner		
1989	Mindfield	Dr. Satorius		
1990	Where the Heart Is	Jerry		
1990	Red Blooded American Girl	Dr. John Alcore		
1990	Money	Martin Yahl		
1991	Firehead	Colonel Garland Vaughn		
1991	Rock-a-Doodle	The Grand Duke of Owls	Voice	
1991	Dragon and Slippers	Pelican	Voice	
1991	Star Trek VI: The Undiscovered Country	General Chang		
1992	Liar's Edge	Harry Weldon		
1992	Impolite	Naples O'Rorke		
1992	Malcolm X	Chaplain Gill		
1994	Wolf	Raymond Alden		
1994	Crackerjack	Ivan Getz		
1995	Dolores Claiborne	Detective John Mackey		
1995	12 Monkeys	Dr. Goines		
1996	The Conspiracy of Fear	Joseph Wakeman		
1997	Babes in Toyland	Barnaby Crookedman	Voice	
1998	The First Christmas	Narrator		
1998	Blackheart	Holmes		
1998	The Clown at Midnight	Mr. Caruthers		
1999	Hidden Agenda	Ulrich Steiner		
1999	Madeline: Lost in Paris	Narrator		
1999	The Insider	Mike Wallace		
2000	Dracula 2000	Abraham Van Helsing		
2001	Lucky Break	Graham Mortimer		
2001	A Beautiful Mind	Dr. Rosen		
2001	Full Disclosure	Robert Lecker		
2002	Ararat	David		
2002	Nicholas Nickleby	Ralph Nickleby		
2003	The Gospel of John	Narrator		
2003	Blizzard	Santa Claus		
2003	Cold Creek Manor	Mr. Massie		
2004	National Treasure	John Adams Gates		
2004	Alexander	Aristotle		
2005	Must Love Dogs	Bill Nolan		
2005	Syriana	Dean Whiting		
2005	The New World	Captain Christopher Newport		
2006	Inside Man	Arthur Case		
2006	The Lake House	Simon Wyler		
2007	Man in the Chair	'Flash' Madden		
2007	Closing the Ring	Jack Etty		
2007	Emotional Arithmetic	David Winters		
2007	Already Dead	Dr. Heller		
2009	Caesar and Cleopatra	Julius Caesar	Also executive producer	
2009	Up	Charles Muntz	Voice	
2009	My Dog Tulip	J.R. Ackerley	Voice	
2009	The Last Station	Leo Tolstoy		
2009	9	1	Voice	
2009	The Imaginarium of Doctor Parnassus	Dr. Parnassus		
2010	Beginners	Hal Fields		
2011	Priest	Monsignor Orelas		
2011	Barrymore	John Barrymore		
2011	The Girl with the Dragon Tattoo	Henrik Vanger		
2013	The Legend of Sarila	Croolik	Voice	
2014	Elsa & Fred	Fred Barcroft		
2014	Hector and the Search for Happiness	Professor Coreman		
2014	The Forger	Joseph Cutter		
2015	Danny Collins	Frank Grubman		
2015	Pixies	Pixie King	Voice	
2015	Remember	Zev Guttman / Otto Wallisch		
2016	The Exception	Kaiser Wilhelm		
2016	Howard Lovecraft and the Frozen Kingdom	Dr. Jeffrey West	Voice	
2017	Elegy	Narrator	Short film	
2017	The Man Who Invented Christmas	Ebenezer Scrooge		
2017	The Star	King Herod	Voice	
2017	All the Money in the World	J. Paul Getty		
2017	Howard Lovecraft and the Undersea Kingdom	Dr. Jeffrey West	Voice	
2018	Boundaries	Jack Jaconi		
2018	Howard Lovecraft and the Kingdom of Madness	Dr. Jeffrey West	Voice	
2019	Cliffs of Freedom	Thanasi		
2019	Wonder Park	Narrator	Uncredited	
2019	Knives Out	Harlan Thrombey		
2019	The Last Full Measure	Frank Pitsenbarger		
2023	Heroes of the Golden Mask	Rizzo	Voice, posthumous release	

== Television ==
Television credits
Year	Title	Role	Notes	Refs.
1953	Broadway Television Theatre	Michael O'Leary	Episode: "Dark Victory"	
1955	Kraft Television Theatre	Robert Carr	Episode: "The King's Bounty"	
1955	Producers' Showcase	Christian de Neuvillette	Episode: "Cyrano de Bergerac"	
1956	General Electric Theater	Walter Shelley	Episode: "A Letter from the Queen"	
1956	The Alcoa Hour	Bruce Quealy	Episode: "Even the Weariest River"	
1957–1958	Omnibus	Thomas Mendip / Oedipus	2 episodes	
1957–1961	DuPont Show of the Month	Various roles	2 episodes	
1958	Little Moon of Alban	Kenneth Boyd	Television film	
1959	Johnny Belinda	Dr. Jack Pelletier	Television film	
1959	A Doll's House	Torvald Helmer	Television film	
1959	The Philadelphia Story	Mike Connor	Television film	
1960	NBC Sunday Showcase	Oliver Wendell Holmes Jr.	2 episodes	
1960	Captain Brassbound's Conversion	Captain Brassbound	Television film	
1961	Playdate	Himself	13 episodes	
1961	Time Remembered	Prince Albert	Television film	
1962	Cyrano de Bergerac	Cyrano de Bergerac	Television film	
1964	Hamlet at Elsinore	Hamlet	Television film	
1968	The Secret of Michelangelo	Narrator	TV documentary	
1971	Don Juan in Hell	Don Juan	Television film	
1974	Witness to Yesterday	Arthur Wellesley, Duke of Wellington	Episode: "The Duke of Wellington"	
1974	After the Fall	Quentin	Television film	
1976	The Moneychangers	Roscoe Heyward	Miniseries, 4 episodes	
1977	Silver Blaze	Sherlock Holmes	Television film	
1977	Jesus of Nazareth	Herod Antipas	Miniseries, 2 episodes	
1979	Riel	Sir John A. Macdonald	Television film	
1980	Desperate Voyage	Burrifous	Television film	
1980	The Shadow Box	Brian	Television film	
1981	When the Circus Came to Town	Duke Royal	Television film	
1981	Dial M for Murder	Tony Wendice	Television film	
1982	Little Gloria... Happy at Last	Reginald Claypoole Vanderbilt	Miniseries, 2 episodes	
1983	The Scarlet and the Black	Colonel Herbert Kappler	Television film	
1983	The Thorn Birds	Archbishop Vittorio Contini-Verchese	Miniseries, 3 episodes	
1983	Prototype	Dr. Carl Forrester	Television film	
1985	Rumpelstiltskin	Narrator	Television film	
1985	The Velveteen Rabbit	Narrator	Television film	
1986	Crossings	Armand DeVilliers	Miniseries, 3 episodes	
1986	Spearfield's Daughter	Lord Jack Cruze	Television film	
1987	A Hazard of Hearts	Sir Giles Staverley	Television film	
1987	The Cosby Show	Jonathan Lawrence	Episode: "Shakespeare"	
1987	The World of David the Gnome	Narrator	English version	
1988–1991	Madeline	Narrator	6 episodes	
1989	Nabokov on Kafka	Vladimir Nabokov	Television short	
1990	A Ghost in Monte Carlo	The Grand Duke Ivan	Television film	
1990–1993	Counterstrike	Alexander Addington	65 episodes	
1991	Young Catherine	Sir Charles Williams	Miniseries, 3 episodes	
1991	A Marriage: Georgia O'Keeffe and Alfred Stieglitz	Alfred Stieglitz	Television film	
1991	Berlin Lady	Wilhelm Speer	6 episodes	
1991	The First Circle	Victor Abakumov	Television film	
1992	Secrets	Mel Wexler	Television film	
1993	A Stranger in the Mirror	Clifton Lawrence	Television film	
1993–1995	Madeline	Narrator	33 episodes	
1995	Harrison Bergeron	John Klaxon	Television film	
1996	We the Jury	Wilfred Fransiscus	Television film	
1996	Skeletons	Reverend Carlyle	Television film	
1997	The Arrow	George Hees	Miniseries, 2 episodes	
1998	Winchell	Franklin D. Roosevelt	Television film	
2000	Nuremberg	Sir David Maxwell-Fyfe	Miniseries, 2 episodes	
2000	The Dinosaur Hunter	Hump Hinton	Television film	
2000	Possessed	Archbishop Hume	Television film	
2000	American Tragedy	F. Lee Bailey	2 episodes	
2001	Leo's Journey	Narrator	Television film	
2001	On Golden Pond	Norman Thayer	Television film	
2002	Night Flight	Harry 'Flash' Peters	Television film	
2002	Agent of Influence	John Watkins	Television film	
2003	Odd Job Jack	Magnus The Maker	Episode: "Holyland"	
2005	Our Fathers	Cardinal Bernard Law	Television film	
2005	Miracle Planet	Narrator	6 episodes	
2005	Four Minutes	Archie Mason	Television film	
2006	American Experience	Narrator / James Tyrone	Episode: "Eugene O'Neill"	
2008	The Summit	P.J. Aimes	Miniseries, 2 episodes	
2013	Muhammad Ali's Greatest Fight	John Marshall Harlan II	Television film	
2019–2021	Departure	Howard Larson	12 episodes	
2020	Jeopardy! The Greatest of All Time	Himself - Video Clue Presenter	1 episode	

== Theatre ==
Theatre credits
Year	Title	Role	Venue	Refs.
1954	The Starcross Story	George Phillips	Royale Theatre, Broadway	
1954	Home is the Hero	Manchester Monagham	Booth Theatre, Broadway	
1955	The Dark is Light Enough	Count Peter Zichy	ANTA Theatre, Broadway	
1955	The Lark	Warwick	Longacre Theatre, Broadway	
1956	Henry V	Henry V	Stratford Festival, Ontario	
1956	Night of the Auk	Lewis Roheman	Playhouse Theatre, Broadway	
1957	Hamlet	Hamlet	Stratford Festival, Ontario	
1957	Twelfth Night	Sir Andrew Aguecheek	Stratford Festival, Ontario	
1958	Much Ado About Nothing	Benedick	Stratford Festival, Ontario	
1958	Henry IV, Part 1	Bardolph	Stratford Festival, Ontario	
1958	The Winter's Tale	Leontes	Stratford Festival, Ontario	
1958	J.B.	Nickles	ANTA Playhouse, Broadway	
1960	Romeo and Juliet	Mercutio	Stratford Festival, Ontario	
1960	King John	Philip the Bastard	Stratford Festival, Ontario	
1961	Much Ado About Nothing	Benedick	Royal Shakespeare Theatre, Stratford	
1961	Richard III	Richard III	Royal Shakespeare Theatre, Stratford	
1961	Becket	King Henry	Aldwych Theatre, West End	
1962	Becket	King Henry	Globe Theatre, West End	
1962	Macbeth	Macbeth	Stratford Festival, Ontario	
1963	The Resistible Rise of Arturo Ui	Arturo Ui	Lunt-Fontanne Theatre, Broadway	
1965	The Royal Hunt of the Sun	Francisco Pizarro	ANTA Theatre, Broadway	
1967	Antony and Cleopatra	Mark Antony	Expo Theatre, Montréal	
1971	Amphitryon 38	Jean Giraudoux	National Theatre, London; Directed by Laurence Olivier	
1973	The Good Doctor	Performer	Eugene O'Neill Theatre, Broadway	
1974	Cyrano	Cyrano de Bergerac	Palace Theatre, Broadway	
1978	Drinks Before Dinner	Edgar	The Public Theater, Off-Broadway	
1981	Henry V	Henry V	American Shakespeare Festival, Connecticut	
1982	Othello	Iago	Winter Garden Theatre, Broadway	
1988	Macbeth	Macbeth	O'Keefe Centre, Toronto Ontario	
1988	Macbeth	Macbeth	Mark Hellinger Theatre, Broadway	
1994	No Man's Land	Spooner	Roundabout Theater Company, Broadway	
1996	Barrymore	John Barrymore	Stratford Festival, Ontario	
1997	Barrymore	John Barrymore	Music Box Theatre, Broadway	
2002	King Lear	King Lear	Stratford Festival, Ontario	
2004	King Lear	King Lear	Vivian Beaumont Theatre, Broadway	
2007	Inherit the Wind	Henry Drummond	Lyceum Theatre, Broadway	
2008	Caesar and Cleopatra	Julius Caesar	Stratford Festival, Ontario	
2010	The Tempest	Prospero	Stratford Festival, Ontario	

== Video games ==
Video game credits
Year	Title	Voice role	Notes	Refs.
2000	Star Trek: Klingon Academy	General Chang	Live action	
2009	Up	Charles Muntz		
2011	The Elder Scrolls V: Skyrim	Arngeir		
2012	Rush: A Disney-Pixar Adventure	Charles Muntz		

== See also ==
- List of awards and nominations received by Christopher Plummer
