= List of awards and nominations received by Christopher Plummer =

Christopher Plummer awards and nominations
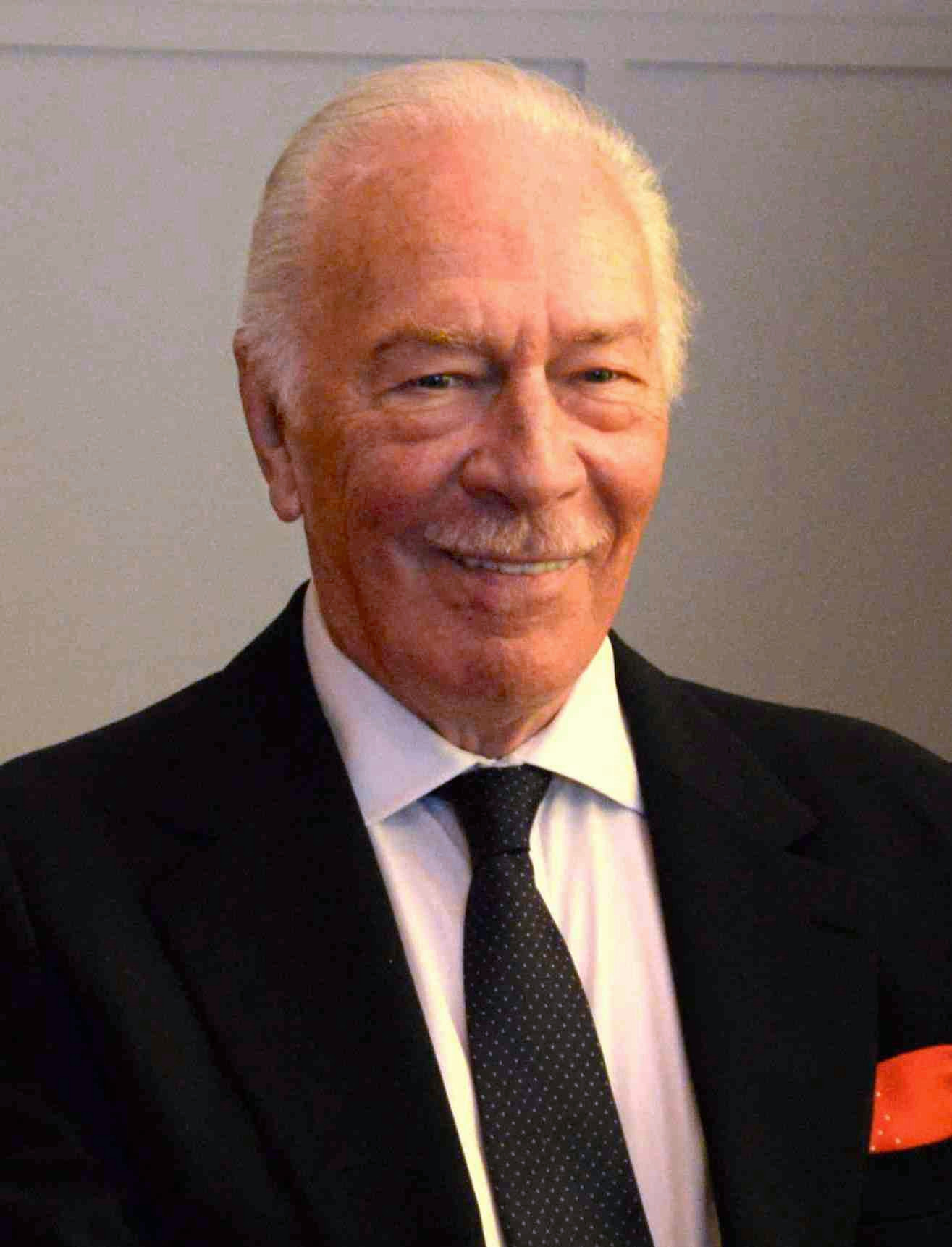
- Plummer at the 2014 Miami International Film Festival
Awards and nominations
Major Awards	Wins	Nominations
Academy Awards	1	3
British Academy Film Awards	1	2
Golden Globe Awards	1	4
Tony Awards	2	7
Screen Actors Guild Awards	1	4
Wins	25
Nominations	63

The following is a list of awards and nominations received by Christopher Plummer.

Christopher Plummer was a Canadian actor known for his diverse roles on stage and screen. Plummer is one of the few actors to have earned the Triple Crown of Acting, having won the Academy Award, Emmy Award and Tony Award. Other awards Plummer has received include a British Academy Film Award, a Golden Globe Award, and a Screen Actors Guild Award. Plummer was just a Grammy Award away from achieving the EGOT status (Emmy, Grammy, Oscar, and Tony), which is considered the "grand slam" of American show business.

Plummer won the Academy Award for Best Supporting Actor at the age of 82 for playing an elderly gay man in Mike Mills' comedy drama Beginners (2010), becoming the oldest person to win an acting award (a distinction he held until being supplanted by 83-year-old Anthony Hopkins in 2021). He was Oscar-nominated for playing Leo Tolstoy in the drama The Last Station (2009) and J. Paul Getty in the crime thriller All the Money in the World (2017), the later making him the oldest person to be nominated in an acting category at the age of 88.

For his work on the Broadway stage he won two Tony Awards, his first for Best Actor in a Musical for playing Cyrano de Bergerac in the musical Cyrano (1974) and Best Actor in a Play for playing John Barrymore in the play Barrymore (1997). He was Tony-nominated for his performances in the plays J.B. (1959), Othello (1982), No Man's Land (1994), King Lear (2004), and Inherit the Wind (2007).

For his work on television he has also received seven Primetime Emmy Award nominations winning twice for Outstanding Lead Actor in a Miniseries or Movie for Arthur Hailey's the Moneychangers (1977) and Outstanding Voice-Over Performance for Madeline in 1994. He has also received a Grammy Award for Best Children's Album nomination for Tchaikovsky's The Nutcracker in 1986.

== Major associations ==
=== Academy Awards ===
Year	Category	Nominated work	Result	Ref.
2010	Best Supporting Actor	The Last Station	Nominated	
2012	Best Supporting Actor	Beginners	Won	
2018	Best Supporting Actor	All the Money in the World	Nominated	

=== BAFTA Awards ===
Year	Category	Nominated work	Result	Ref.
British Academy Film Awards
2011	Best Supporting Actor	Beginners	Won	
2017	Best Supporting Actor	All the Money in the World	Nominated	

=== Emmy Awards ===
Year	Category	Nominated work	Result	Ref.
Primetime Emmy Awards
1959	Outstanding Lead Actor in a Limited Series or Movie	Little Moon of Alban	Nominated	
1966	Outstanding Lead Actor in a Limited Series or Movie	Hamlet at Elsinore	Nominated	
1977	Outstanding Lead Actor in a Limited Series or Movie	Arthur Hailey's the Moneychangers	Won	
1983	Outstanding Supporting Actor in a Limited Series or Movie	The Thorn Birds	Nominated	
1994	Outstanding Voice-Over Performance	Madeline	Won	
2005	Outstanding Supporting Actor in a Limited Series or Movie	Our Fathers	Nominated	
2011	Outstanding Voice-Over Performance	Moguls & Movie Stars: A History of Hollywood	Nominated	

=== Golden Globe Awards ===
Year	Category	Nominated work	Result	Ref.
2001	Best Supporting Actor – Television	American Tragedy	Nominated	
2010	Best Supporting Actor - Motion Picture	The Last Station	Nominated	
2012	Best Supporting Actor - Motion Picture	Beginners	Won	
2018	Best Supporting Actor - Motion Picture	All the Money in the World	Nominated	

=== Grammy Awards ===
Year	Category	Nominated work	Result	Ref.
1986	Best Album for Children	E.T.A. Hoffmann/Tchaikovsky: The Nutcracker	Nominated	

=== Screen Actors Guild Awards ===
Year	Category	Nominated work	Result	Ref.
2002	Outstanding Cast in a Motion Picture	A Beautiful Mind	Nominated	
2006	Outstanding Actor in a Miniseries or Television Movie	Our Fathers	Nominated	
2010	Outstanding Actor in a Supporting Role	The Last Station	Nominated	
2012	Outstanding Actor in a Supporting Role	Beginners	Won	

=== Tony Awards ===
Year	Category	Nominated work	Result	Ref.
1959	Best Actor in a Play	J.B.	Nominated	
1974	Best Actor in a Musical	Cyrano	Won	
1982	Best Actor in a Play	Othello	Nominated	
1994	Best Actor in a Play	No Man's Land	Nominated	
1997	Best Actor in a Play	Barrymore	Won	
2004	Best Actor in a Play	King Lear	Nominated	
2007	Best Actor in a Play	Inherit the Wind	Nominated	

== Critics associations ==
Organizations	Year	Category	Work	Result	Ref.
Boston Society of Film Critics	1999	Best Supporting Actor	The Insider	Won	
Central Ohio Film Critics Association	2011	Best Supporting Actor	Beginners	Won	
Chicago Film Critics Association	1999	Best Supporting Actor	The Insider	Nominated	
Chicago Film Critics Association	2011	Best Supporting Actor	Beginners	Nominated	
Critics' Choice Movie Award	2011	Best Supporting Actor	Beginners	Won	
Dallas-Fort Worth Film Critics Association	2011	Best Supporting Actor	Beginners	Won	
Denver Film Critics Society	2011	Best Supporting Actor	Beginners	Won	
Hanoi International Film Festival	2015	Best Main Actor	Remember	Won	
Hawaii Film Critics Society	2017	Best Supporting Actor	All the Money in the World	Nominated	
Houston Film Critics Society	2011	Best Supporting Actor	Beginners	Nominated	
Indiana Film Journalists Association	2011	Best Supporting Actor	Beginners	Won	
Indiewire Critic's Poll	2011	Best Supporting Performance	Beginners	Won	
Iowa Film Critics Award	2011	Best Supporting Actor	Beginners	Won	
Kansas City Film Critics Circle	2011	Best Supporting Actor	Beginners	Won	
Las Vegas Film Critics Society	1999	Best Supporting Actor	The Insider	Nominated	
London Film Critics' Circle	2011	Best Supporting Actor of the Year	Beginners	Nominated	
Los Angeles Film Critics Association	1999	Best Supporting Actor	The Insider	Won	
Los Angeles Film Critics Association	2011	Best Supporting Actor	Beginners	Won	
National Board of Review	2002	Best Acting by an Ensemble	Nicholas Nickleby	Won	
National Board of Review	2011	Best Supporting Actor	Beginners	Won	
National Society of Film Critics	1999	Best Supporting Actor	The Insider	Won	
National Society of Film Critics	2011	Best Supporting Actor	Beginners	Nominated	
New York Film Critics Circle	1999	Best Supporting Actor	The Insider	Nominated	
New York Film Critics Circle	2011	Best Supporting Actor	Beginners	Nominated	
North Carolina Film Critics Association	2017	Best Supporting Actor	All the Money in the World	Nominated	
North Texas Film Critics Association	2011	Best Supporting Actor	Beginners	Won	
Online Film Critics Society	1999	Best Supporting Actor	The Insider	Nominated	
Online Film Critics Society	2011	Best Supporting Actor	Beginners	Won	
Phoenix Film Critics Society	2011	Best Supporting Actor	Beginners	Nominated	
San Diego Film Critics Society	1999	Best Supporting Actor	The Insider	Nominated	
San Diego Film Critics Society	2011	Best Supporting Actor	Beginners	Nominated	
Southeastern Film Critics Association	2011	Best Supporting Actor	Beginners	Won	
Toronto Film Critics Association	2011	Best Supporting Actor	Beginners	Won	
Utah Film Critics Association Award	2011	Best Supporting Actor	Beginners	Nominated	
Vancouver Film Critics Circle	2011	Best Supporting Actor	Beginners	Won	
Vancouver Film Critics Circle	2015	Best Actor in a Canadian Film	Remember	Nominated	
Village Voice Film Poll	2011	Best Supporting Actor	Beginners	Nominated	
Washington D.C. Area Film Critics Association	2011	Best Supporting Actor	Beginners	Nominated	
Women Film Critics Circle	2014	Best Screen Couple (shared with Shirley MacLaine)	Elsa & Fred	Nominated	
Women Film Critics Circle	2015	Best Lead Actor	Remember	Nominated	

== Miscellaneous awards ==
Organizations	Year	Category	Work	Result	Ref.
ACTRA Award	2011	Outstanding Performance - Male	Beginners	Won	
ACTRA Award	2015	Outstanding Performance - Male	Remember	Won	
Alliance of Women Film Journalists	2011	Best Supporting Actor	Beginners	Won	
Annie Award	1998	Outstanding Voice Acting in a Feature Production	Babes in Toyland	Nominated	
AARP Movies for Grownups Award	2010	Best Supporting Actor	The Last Station	Nominated	
AARP Movies for Grownups Award	2010	Best Grownup Love Story (shared with Helen Mirren)	The Last Station	Nominated	
AARP Movies for Grownups Award	2011	Best Supporting Actor	Beginners	Won	
AARP Movies for Grownups Award	2017	Best Supporting Actor	All the Money in the World	Nominated	
Awards Circuit Community Award	2001	Best Cast Ensemble	A Beautiful Mind	Nominated	
Awards Circuit Community Award	2011	Best Supporting Actor	Beginners	Won	
Chlotrudis Award	2011	Best Supporting Actor	Beginners	Won	
Dorian Awards	2011	Film Performance of the Year	Beginners	Nominated	
DVD Exclusive Award	2001	Best Supporting Actor	Full Disclosure	Nominated	
Canadian Screen Awards	2013	Best Performance in a Performing Arts Program or Series	The Tempest	Won	
Canadian Screen Awards	2016	Lifetime Achievement Award	—N/a	Honoured	
Canadian Screen Awards	2017	Best Actor	Remember	Nominated	
Canadian Screen Awards	2021	Best Supporting Actor in a Drama Program or Series	Departure	Won	
Genie Awards (Note: In 2012, the Genie Awards was merged with its sister presentation, the Gemini Awards, to form a new award presentation known as the Canadian Screen Awards)	1978	Best Actor	The Silent Partner	Nominated	
Genie Awards	1980	Best Actor	Murder by Decree	Won	
Genie Awards	1982	Best Actor	The Amateur	Nominated	
Genie Awards	1992	Best Actor in a Continuing Leading Dramatic Role	Counterstrike	Nominated	
Genie Awards	1993	Best Supporting Actor	Impolite	Nominated	
Genie Awards	1996	Best Supporting Actor in a Drama Program or Series	Harrison Bergeron	Nominated	
Genie Awards	2003	Best Actor	Ararat	Nominated	
Genie Awards	2004	Best Supporting Actor	Blizzard	Nominated	
Genie Awards	2009	Best Actor	Emotional Arithmetic	Nominated	
Genie Awards	2009	Best Performance in a Performing Arts Program or Series	Caesar and Cleopatra	Nominated	
Genie Awards	2010	Best Supporting Actor in a Drama Program or Series	The Summit	Nominated	
Gold Derby Award	2011	Best Supporting Actor	Beginners	Won	
Golden Schmoes Award	2011	Best Supporting Actor of the Year	Beginners	Nominated	
Gotham Awards	2011	Best Ensemble Performance	Beginners	Won	
Hollywood Film Festival	2011	Best Supporting Actor of the Year	Beginners	Won	
Independent Spirit Awards	2009	Best Supporting Male	The Last Station	Nominated	
Independent Spirit Awards	2011	Best Supporting Male	Beginners	Won	
Online Film & Television Association	1999	Best Supporting Male	The Insider	Nominated	
Online Film & Television Association	2005	Best Supporting Actor - Motion Picture or Miniseries	Our Fathers	Nominated	
Online Film & Television Association	2011	Best Supporting Actor	Beginners	Won	
Method Fest Award	2007	Best Ensemble Cast	Man in the Chair	Won	
Palm Beach International Film Festival	2007	Best Lead Actor	Man in the Chair	Won	
Santa Barbara International Film Festival	2011	Special Jury Prize for Artistic Merit	Beginners	Won	
Satellite Award	2000	Best Supporting Actor – Motion Picture	The Insider	Nominated	
Satellite Award	2011	Best Supporting Actor – Motion Picture	Beginners	Nominated	

== Other theatre awards ==
Organizations	Year	Category	Work	Result	Ref.
Drama Desk Award	1982	Outstanding Actor in a Play	Othello	Won	
Drama Desk Award	1994	Outstanding Actor in a Play	No Man's Land	Nominated	
Drama Desk Award	1997	Outstanding Actor in a Play	Barrymore	Won	
Drama Desk Award	2004	Outstanding Actor in a Play	King Lear	Nominated	
Drama Desk Award	2007	Outstanding Actor in a Play	Inherit the Wind	Nominated	
Outer Critics Circle Award	1973	Outstanding Actor in a Play	Play	Won	
Outer Critics Circle Award	1997	Outstanding Actor in a Play	Barrymore	Won	
Outer Critics Circle Award	2007	Outstanding Actor in a Play	Inherit the Wind	Nominated	
Theatre World Awards	1955	Distinguished Performance	The Dark is Light Enough	Won	
Theatre World Awards	2014	John Willis Award		Won	

== Honorary awards ==
Organizations	Year	Notes	Result	Ref.
Canada State Order	1970	Order of Canada	Honored	
Canada's Walk of Fame	1998	Entertainment Star	Honored	
National Board of Review	2002	Career Achievement Award	Honored	
Method Fest Independent Film Festival	2007	Lifetime Achievement Award	Honored	
Sarasota Film Festival	2011	Master of Cinema Award	Honored	
Santa Barbara International Film Festival	2012	Maltin Modern Master Award	Honored	
Canadian Screen Awards	2017	Lifetime Achievement Award	Honored	

== Canadian Honours ==
Canadian Honours System

Ribbon	Description	Notes
	Companion of the Order of Canada (C.C.)	Awarded on: December 20, 1968; Invested on: September 25, 1970; For his contribution to the performing arts at home and abroad.
	Queen Elizabeth II Silver Jubilee Medal for Canada	1977; This medal has been awarded to all people being awarded with a Companionship within the Order of Canada.
	125th Anniversary of the Confederation of Canada Medal	1993; This medal has been awarded to all people being awarded with a Companionship within the Order of Canada.
	Queen Elizabeth II Golden Jubilee Medal for Canada	2002; This medal has been awarded to all people being awarded with a Companionship within the Order of Canada.; Canadian version
	Queen Elizabeth II Diamond Jubilee Medal for Canada	2012; This medal has been awarded to all people being awarded with a Companionship within the Order of Canada.; Canadian version

== See also ==
- Christopher Plummer on screen and stage
