= Hidden Agenda =

Hidden Agenda or Hidden Agendas may refer to:

== Video games ==
- Hidden Agenda (1988 video game), a 1988 text-based game
- Hidden Agenda (2017 video game), a thriller video game developed by Supermassive Games for the PlayStation 4

== Film ==
- Hidden Agenda (1990 film), a political thriller directed by Ken Loach and written by Jim Allen
- Hidden Agenda, a 1999 film starring Christopher Plummer
- Hidden Agenda (2001 film), an action film starring Dolph Lundgren

== Music ==
- "Hidden Agenda" (Craig David song)
- "Hidden Agenda" (Pitchshifter song)
- Hidden Agenda Records, an independent record label under Parasol Records
- Hidden Agenda (live house), a quasi-illegal music venue in the industrial area of Kwun Tong, Hong Kong

== Television ==
- Hidden Agenda (game show), a 2010 American game show
- Hidden Agenda (TV series), a 2023 Thai comedy romance series
- "Hidden Agenda", a fictional photograph in the 1995–1996 series Nowhere Man
- "Hidden Agendas" (X-men episode), 1997

== Other ==
- Hidden Agenda, a student run newspaper at Western Technical-Commercial School in Toronto, Ontario, Canada

== See also ==
- Ulterior Motive
