= Christopher Plummer =

Canadian actor (1929–2021)

Christopher Plummer CC
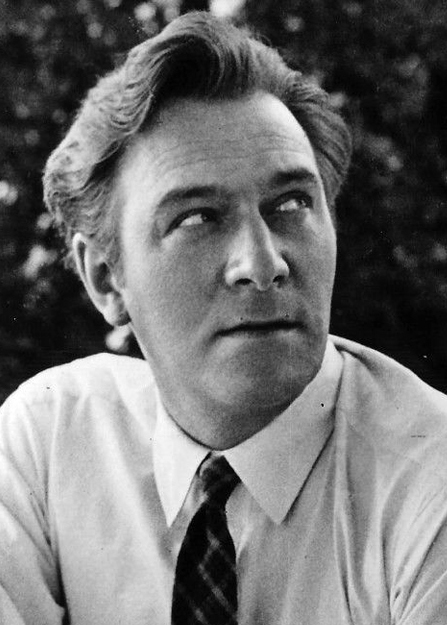
- Plummer in 1964
- Born: Arthur Christopher Orme Plummer; December 13, 1929; Toronto, Ontario, Canada
- Died: February 5, 2021 (aged 91); Weston, Connecticut, U.S.
- Occupation: Actor
- Years active: 1946–2021
- Works: Filmography
- Spouses: Tammy Grimes (m. 1956; div. 1960); Patricia Lewis (m. 1962; div. 1967); Elaine Taylor (m. 1970)
- Children: Amanda Plummer
- Mother: Isabella Mary Abbott
- Relatives: Janina Fialkowska (cousin); Nigel Bruce (second cousin); F. B. Fetherstonhaugh (great-uncle); Maude Abbott (great-aunt); John Abbott (great-grandfather)
- Awards: Full list

Arthur Christopher Orme Plummer (December 13, 1929 – February 5, 2021) was a Canadian actor. His career spanned seven decades, gaining him recognition for his performances in film, stage, and television. His accolades included an Academy Award, two Tony Awards and two Primetime Emmy Awards, making him the only Canadian recipient of the "Triple Crown of Acting". He also received a BAFTA Award, a Golden Globe Award and Screen Actors Guild Award, as well as a nomination for a Grammy Award.

Plummer began his acting career in Ottawa and followed this with stage roles in Canada, the U.S. and Bermuda. He made his Broadway debut in the 1954 play The Starcross Story. He received two Tony Awards, one for Best Actor in a Musical playing Cyrano de Bergerac in Cyrano (1974) and the other for Best Actor in a Play portraying John Barrymore in Barrymore (1997). His other Tony-nominated roles include J.B. (1959), Othello (1982), No Man's Land (1994), King Lear (2004) and Inherit the Wind (2007).

Plummer made his film debut in Stage Struck (1958), and landed his first starring role that same year in Wind Across the Everglades. He became a household name with his role as Captain Georg von Trapp in the musical film The Sound of Music (1965) alongside Julie Andrews. During this time he starred in The Fall of the Roman Empire (1964), Waterloo (1970) and The Man Who Would Be King (1975).

Plummer received an Academy Award for Best Supporting Actor for playing an elderly gay man in the comedy-drama Beginners (2011); he was nominated for the same award for his portrayals of Leo Tolstoy in the drama The Last Station (2009) and J. Paul Getty in the crime thriller All the Money in the World (2017). He is also known for his roles in The Return of the Pink Panther (1975), Somewhere in Time (1980), The Man Who Planted Trees (1987), Star Trek VI: The Undiscovered Country (1991), Malcolm X (1992), The Insider (1999), A Beautiful Mind (2001), National Treasure (2004), The New World (2005), Syriana (2005), Inside Man (2006), The Girl with the Dragon Tattoo (2011) and Knives Out (2019).

== Early life and education ==
Arthur Christopher Orme Plummer was born on December 13, 1929, in Toronto, Ontario. He was the only child of John Orme Plummer (1894–1977), who sold stocks and other securities, and Isabella Mary Abbott, who worked as secretary to the dean of sciences at McGill University, and was the granddaughter of Canadian prime minister Sir John Abbott. On his father's side, Plummer's great-uncle was patent lawyer and agent F. B. Fetherstonhaugh. Plummer was also a cousin of Canadian classical pianist Janina Fialkowska and a second cousin of British actor Nigel Bruce, known for portraying Doctor Watson to Basil Rathbone's Sherlock Holmes.

Plummer's parents separated shortly after his birth, and he was brought up mainly by his mother in the Abbott family home in Senneville, Quebec, on the western tip of the Island of Montreal. In addition to English, he spoke French fluently. As a schoolboy, he began studying to be a concert pianist, but developed a love for theatre at an early age, and began acting while he was attending the High School of Montreal. He took up acting after watching Laurence Olivier's film Henry V (1944). He learned the basics of acting as an apprentice with the Montreal Repertory Theatre, where fellow Montrealer William Shatner also played.

Plummer never attended university, something he regretted all his life. Although his mother and his father's family had ties with McGill University, he was never a McGill student.

In 1946, he caught the attention of Montreal Gazette's theatre critic Herbert Whittaker with his performance as Mr. Darcy in a Montreal High School production of Pride and Prejudice. Whittaker was also amateur stage director of the Montreal Repertory theatre, and he cast Plummer at age 18 as Oedipus in Jean Cocteau's La Machine infernale.

== Career ==
=== 1948–1964: Early roles and theatre debut ===
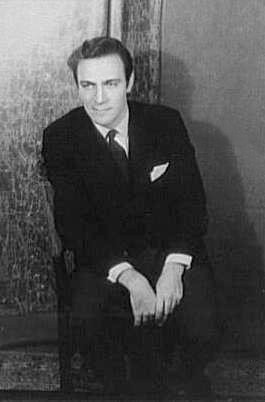
Photograph by Carl Van Vechten, 1959

Plummer made his professional acting debut in September 1948 with Ottawa's Stage Society, in The Rivals, followed by a full season of roles, a new production every two weeks, providing him with valuable experience. Plummer moved to Montreal, where he performed roles as an apprentice artist with the Montreal Repertory Theatre alongside fellow apprenticing actor William Shatner. In 1952, he starred in a number of productions at the Bermudiana Theatre in the City of Hamilton, in the British colony of Bermuda where he was seen and recruited by an American producer, although he was reluctant to leave Bermuda. Edward Everett Horton hired Plummer to appear as Gerard in the 1953 road show production of André Roussin's Nina, a role originated on Broadway by David Niven in 1951. Plummer made his Broadway debut in January 1953 in the Diana Morgan play The Starcross Story, a show that closed on opening night after a plagiarism lawsuit shut down the production. Plummer acted opposite Mary Astor and Margaret Bannerman.

His next Broadway appearance, Home is the Hero, lasted 30 performances from September to October 1954. He appeared in support of Broadway legend Katharine Cornell and film legend Tyrone Power in The Dark Is Light Enough, which lasted 69 performances from February to April 1955. The play toured several cities, with Plummer serving as Power's understudy. Later that same year, he appeared in his first Broadway hit, opposite Julie Harris (who won a Tony Award) in Jean Anouilh's The Lark. After this success, he appeared in Night of the Auk, which was not a success, He appeared as Jason opposite Dame Judith Anderson in Robinson Jeffers' adaptation of Medea at the Theatre Sara Bernhardt in Paris in 1955. The American National Theatre and Academy production, directed by Guthrie McClintic, was part of Le Festival International. Also in 1955, he played Mark Antony in Julius Caesar and Ferdinand in The Tempest at the American Shakespeare Festival (Stratford, Connecticut). He returned to the American Shakespeare Festival in 1981 to play the title role in Henry V.

Plummer made his Canadian television debut in the February 1953 Canadian Broadcasting Corporation production of Othello, starring Lorne Greene as the Moor. His American television debut was also in 1953 on a Studio One episode entitled "The Gathering Night", as an artist who finds success just as his eyesight begins to fail him. He also appeared throughout the 1950s on both dramatic showcase programs like The Alcoa Hour, General Electric Theater, Kraft Television Theatre, and Omnibus and episodic series. In 1956, he appeared with Jason Robards and Constance Ford in an episode entitled "A Thief There Was" of CBS's anthology series Appointment with Adventure. Plummer made his debut at the Stratford Shakespeare Festival in 1956, playing the title role in Henry V, which subsequently was performed that year at the Edinburgh Festival. He played the title role in Hamlet and Sir Andrew Aguecheek in Twelfth Night at Stratford in 1957. The following year, he played Leontes in The Winter's Tale, Bardolph in Henry IV, Part 1, and Benedick in Much Ado About Nothing. In 1959, Plummer appeared in Elia Kazan's successful Broadway production of Archibald MacLeish's Pulitzer Prize-winning play J.B.; Plummer was nominated for his first Tony for Best Actor in Play. (J.B. also won Tonys for Best Play and for Kazan's direction.)

He appeared in the live television drama Little Moon of Alban with Julie Harris, for which he received his first Emmy Award nomination. He also appeared with Harris in the 1958 television adaptation of Johnny Belinda and played Torvald Helmer to Harris' Nora in a 1959 television version of Henrik Ibsen's A Doll's House. Plummer starred in the television adaptations of Philip Barry's The Philadelphia Story (1959), George Bernard Shaw's Captain Brassbound's Conversion (1960), Jean Anouilh's Time Remembered (playing the role of Prince Albert originated by Richard Burton on Broadway), and Edmond Rostand's Cyrano de Bergerac (1962).

In April 1961, Plummer appeared as Benedick in Much Ado About Nothing with the Royal Shakespeare Company at the Shakespeare Memorial Theatre in Stratford-upon-Avon, England. He also appeared with the RSC in May 1961 in the lead role of Richard III. He made his London debut on June 11, 1961, playing King Henry II in Jean Anouilh's Becket with the RSC at the Aldwych Theatre, directed by Peter Hall. The production later transferred to the Globe for a December 1961 to April 1962 run. For his performance, Plummer won the Evening Standard Award for Best Actor. At the Stratford Festival in 1960, he played Philip the Bastard in King John and Mercutio in Romeo and Juliet. In 1962, Plummer played the title roles in both Cyrano de Bergerac and Macbeth, returning in 1967 to play Mark Antony in Antony and Cleopatra. Plummer appeared less frequently on Broadway in the 1960s as he moved from New York to London.

In 1964, his performance of the Gloomy Dane in the BBC production Hamlet at Elsinore garnered him his second Emmy nomination. He played Hamlet in Hamlet at Elsinore, produced by Danish and British BBC TV (1964), taped at Elsinore Castle.

Plummer appeared in the title role in a 1963 production of Bertolt Brecht's The Resistible Rise of Arturo Ui, which did not succeed, but he had a great success in Peter Shaffer's The Royal Hunt of the Sun, playing conquistador Francisco Pizarro to David Carradine's Atahuallpa. Both performances were "stunning" by critic Caldwell Titcomb, as Plummer did wonders "of extraordinary beauty and deep pain" in playing his complex character. Plummer's film career began in 1958 when Sidney Lumet cast him as a young writer in Stage Struck. That same year, Plummer played the lead in Nicholas Ray's film Wind Across the Everglades. In 1963, he was the subject of a short National Film Board of Canada documentary, 30 Minutes, Mister Plummer, directed by Anne Claire Poirier.

Plummer returned to film playing the Roman emperor Commodus in Anthony Mann's epic The Fall of the Roman Empire (1964).

=== 1965–1979: The Sound of Music and stardom ===
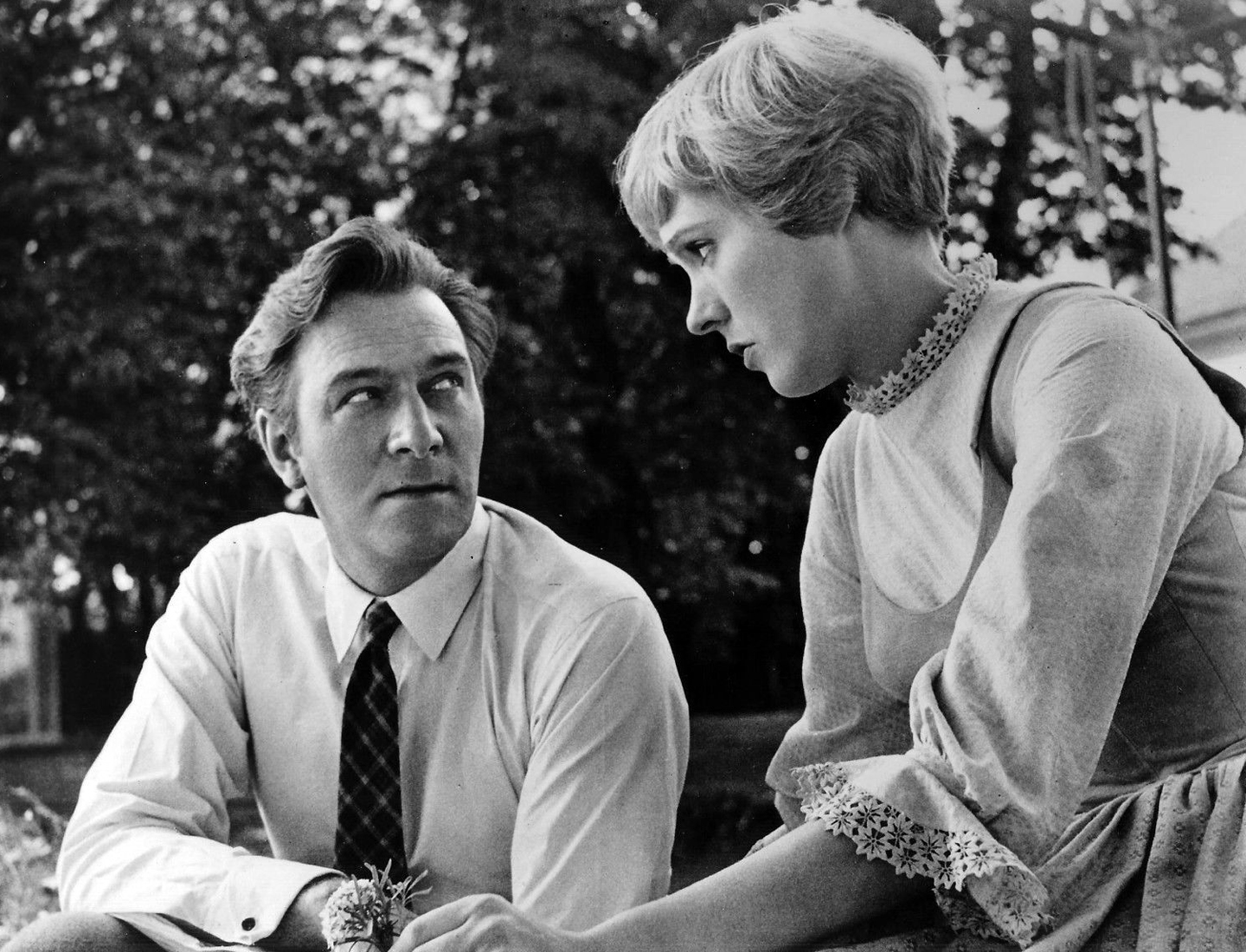
Plummer acting alongside Julie Andrews in The Sound of Music (1965)

Plummer remains widely known for his portrayal of Captain Von Trapp due to the box-office success and continued popularity of the Robert Wise-directed musical epic The Sound of Music (1965). Plummer acted alongside Julie Andrews, and the film earned five Academy Awards, including Best Picture. Although he was embarrassed, at first, about the role, which Plummer described as "so awful and sentimental and gooey", the film made cinematic history, becoming the all-time top-grossing film, eclipsing Gone with the Wind. He found all aspects of making the film unpleasant, except working with Andrews, and he avoided using its name, instead calling it "that movie", "S&M" and "The Sound of Mucus". He declined to attend the 40th Anniversary cast reunion, but he did provide commentary on the 2005 DVD release.

He relented for the 45th anniversary and appeared with the full cast on The Oprah Winfrey Show on October 28, 2010. In 2009, Plummer said that he was "a bit bored with the character". He said: "Although we worked hard enough to make him interesting, it was a bit like flogging a dead horse. And the subject matter is not mine. I mean, it can't appeal to every person in the world." However, he admitted that the film itself was well made and was proud to be associated with a film with such mass appeal. "But it was a very well-made movie, and it's a family movie and we haven't seen a family movie, I don't think, on that scale for ages." Over the years, Plummer softened his stance, eventually recognizing the film's mass appeal and place in cinematic history. In the 2000s, he rewatched the film and said in his autobiography he was much impressed and ‘totally seduced’ by it. He also stated that his earlier Shakespearean performances had left him unprepared for the role and he had made peace with the film, which he began referring to by its original title. In one interview he said that he had "terrific memories" of making the movie. He also began a lifelong strong friendship with co-star Dame Julie Andrews. "[We] should have ended up together. We should have had a huge smashing affair. But there was no time because she had her children with her, which was most inconvenient," Plummer said to ABC News reporter Diane Sawyer at the 50th anniversary celebration in 2015.

He was in Inside Daisy Clover (1965), then played World War Two agent Eddie Chapman in Triple Cross (1966), and had a supporting role as Field Marshal Erwin Rommel in The Night of the Generals (1967). Plummer was cast to replace Rex Harrison for the film adaptation of Doctor Dolittle. This decision was later reversed, but Plummer was nonetheless paid $87,500 for signing the contract. At the same time, Plummer was performing in the stage play The Royal Hunt of the Sun and his whole Dolittle participation was so brief that Plummer never missed a performance. Plummer had the title role in Oedipus the King (1968) and The High Commissioner (1968), playing an Australian in the latter. Plummer was one of many stars in Battle of Britain and it was at his insistence that his character - Squadron Leader Colin Harvey - has "CANADA" flashes on the shoulders of his uniform (1969), and the lead in a musical, Lock Up Your Daughters (1969). In the 1969 film adaptation of The Royal Hunt of the Sun, Plummer plays the Inca Emperor Atahualpa to Robert Shaw's Pizarro. On screen, Plummer portrayed the Duke of Wellington in Waterloo (1970). The Pyx (1973) was his first Canadian film. He played Rudyard Kipling in The Man Who Would Be King (1975). He also appeared in the comedy The Return of the Pink Panther (1975), alongside Peter Sellers and The Silent Partner (1978) opposite Elliott Gould. He appeared in Aces High (1976), Starcrash (1978), International Velvet (1978) and Murder by Decree (1979) (playing Sherlock Holmes).

From June 1971 to January 1972, he appeared at the Royal National Theatre, acting in repertory for the season. The plays he appeared in were Jean Giraudoux's Amphitryon 38 directed by Laurence Olivier; Georg Büchner's Danton's Death (director Jonathan Miller); Adrian Mitchell's Tyger; Luigi Pirandello's The Rules of the Game; and Eugene O'Neill's Long Day's Journey into Night at the New Theatre in London. From May to June 1973, he appeared on Broadway as the title character in Cyrano, a musical adaptation of Edmond Rostand's 1897 play Cyrano de Bergerac by Anthony Burgess and Michael J. Lewis. For that performance, Plummer won the Tony Award for Best Actor in a Musical and a Drama Desk Award for Outstanding Performance. Later that year, he played Anton Chekhov in Neil Simon's adaptation of several Chekhov short stories, The Good Doctor. Another notable play in which he appeared was the 1974 adaptation of Arthur Miller's After the Fall, in which he played Quentin (a part originated on Broadway by Jason Robards) opposite Faye Dunaway's Maggie.

Plummer acted in Lovers and Madmen at the Opera House at the Kennedy Center in Washington, D.C., in 1973 and in Love and Master Will at the same venue in 1975. Love and Master Will consisted of selections from the works of William Shakespeare on the subject of love, arranged by Plummer. His co-stars were Zoe Caldwell, Bibi Andersson and Leonard Nimoy. Plummer played "Edgar" in E. L. Doctorow's Drinks before Dinner with the New York Shakespeare Festival at the Public/Newman Theatre in New York City in 1978. He appeared as Herod Antipas in the television miniseries Jesus of Nazareth (1977) alongside the ensemble cast which included Laurence Olivier, James Earl Jones and James Mason. Plummer played Herbert Kappler in the true based television film The Scarlet and the Black. That same year, he starred in the five-time Emmy Award-winning television series The Thorn Birds, alongside Barbara Stanwyck and Jean Simmons.

=== 1980–1997: Return to theatre ===
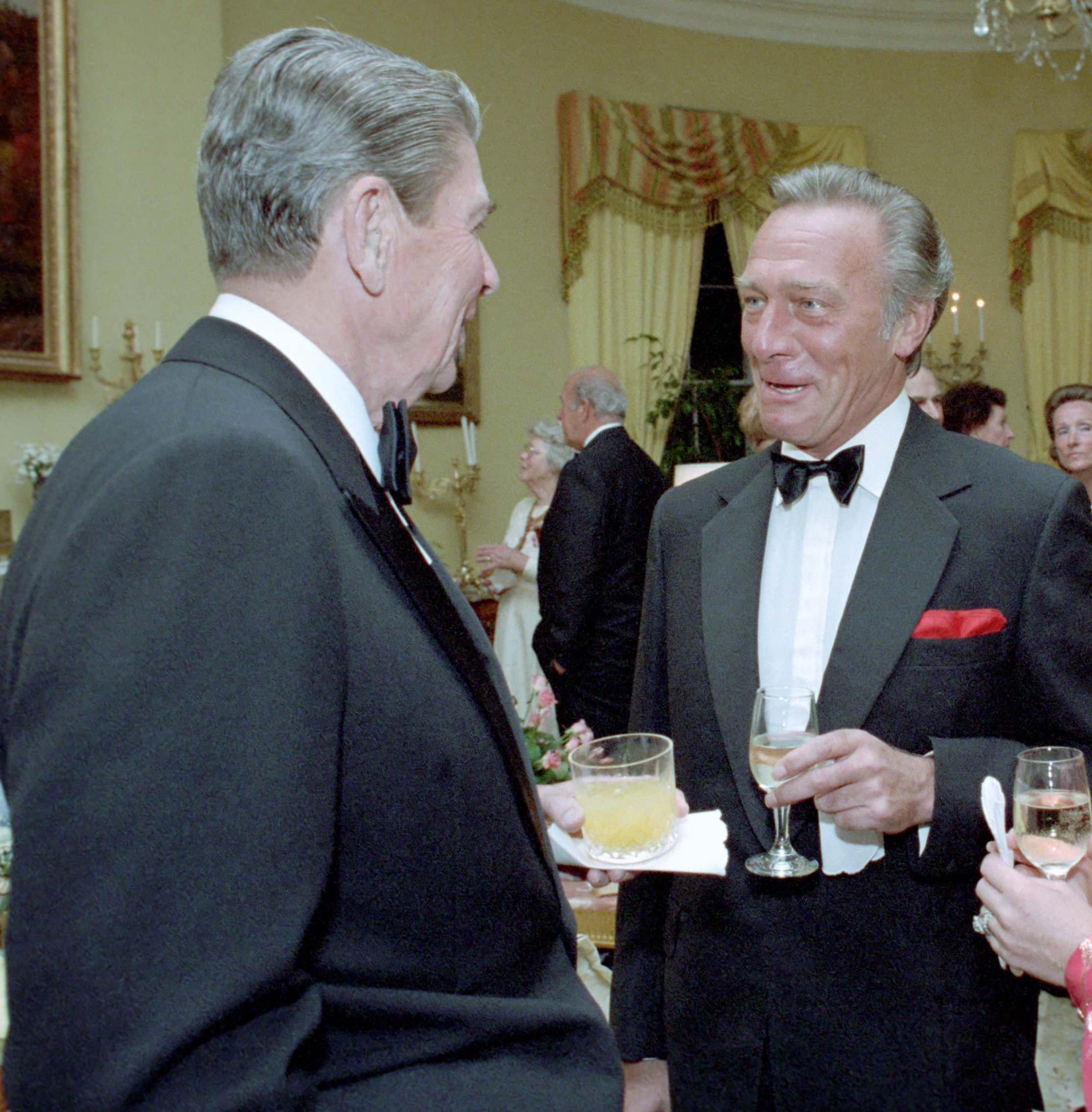
Plummer with President Ronald Reagan at the White House, 1985

During this time Plummer appeared in the romantic drama Somewhere in Time (1980), the drama Eyewitness (1981), the comedy Dragnet (1987) and Shadow Dancing (1988). Plummer also did some voice work, such as his role of Henri the pigeon in An American Tail (1986) and the villainous Grand Duke of Owls in Rock-a-Doodle (1991), both directed by Don Bluth. In 1982, he starred on Broadway production of the Shakespearean tragedy Othello, playing Iago opposite James Earl Jones' Moor. The production also featured performances from Kelsey Grammer as Cassio and Dianne Wiest as Desdemona. New York Times theatre critic Frank Rich wrote in his original review, "Mr. Plummer, a sensational actor in peak form, has made something crushing out of Shakespeare's archvillain. He gives us evil so pure - and so bottomless - that it can induce tears. Our tears are not for the dastardly Iago, of course - that would be wrong. No, what Mr. Plummer does is make us weep for a civilization that can produce such a man and allow him to flower." For his performance he received a Tony Award for Best Actor in a Play nomination losing to Roger Rees in The Life and Adventures of Nicholas Nickleby.

In 1987, Plummer provided the English narration for Frédéric Back's animated film The Man Who Planted Trees. The film won Best Animated Short at the 60th Academy Awards. In 1988, he starred in another Shakespeare adaptation on Broadway in the title role in Macbeth with Glenda Jackson playing his lady. Frank Rich wrote of his performance "Mr. Plummer's thoughtful, beautifully spoken performance best illuminates the strengths and built-in limitations of the entire enterprise. This actor grapples arrestingly with his early bouts of conscience, as horrible imaginings send Macbeth's heart knocking at his ribs." From 1990 to 1993, he starred in the Canadian-French drama series Counterstrike. From 1993 to 1995, he narrated the animated television series Madeline, for which he received an Emmy Award, as well as the animated television series The World of David the Gnome. He appeared with Jason Robards in the 1994 revival of Harold Pinter's No Man's Land by the Roundabout Theatre Company. Variety film critic Jeremy Gerard praised Plummer's performance while critiquing Robards by writing, "They're a remarkable pair to watch wrangling with Pinter's elliptical, often uncrackable script. As it happens, Plummer emerges triumphant, while Robards seems utterly at sea...Plummer plays the humour and the bathos with equal ease and complete conviction. By turns funny and heartbreaking, it's an exquisite, haunting performance." For his performance Plummer received his fourth Tony Award nomination.

Plummer achieved great success in the 1997 Broadway production of the William Luce play Barrymore portraying John Barrymore a few months before his death. Vincent Canby in his New York Times review he praised Plummer for his performance "With the confidence of the superb actor he has become, and in the trim of an athlete, Christopher Plummer is here in a new play, giving an achingly funny, memorably strong and debonair performance". After a successful run on Broadway he went on tour with the production. His performance brought him his second Tony Award (this time as Best Actor in a Play) and a Drama Desk Award as Outstanding Actor in a Play. Plummer continued acting in films including the science fiction film Star Trek VI: The Undiscovered Country (1991), which was a welcome opportunity for him since he was a fan of the Star Trek franchise which also allowed him to perform with his former understudy and long-time friend, William Shatner. He also appeared in Spike Lee's biographical drama Malcolm X (1992), Mike Nichols' horror drama Wolf (1994), Taylor Hackford's psychological drama Dolores Claiborne (1995), and Terry Gilliam's science fiction drama 12 Monkeys (1995). Plummer portrayed George Hees in the Canadian miniseries The Arrow (1997).

=== 1998–2009: Established actor ===
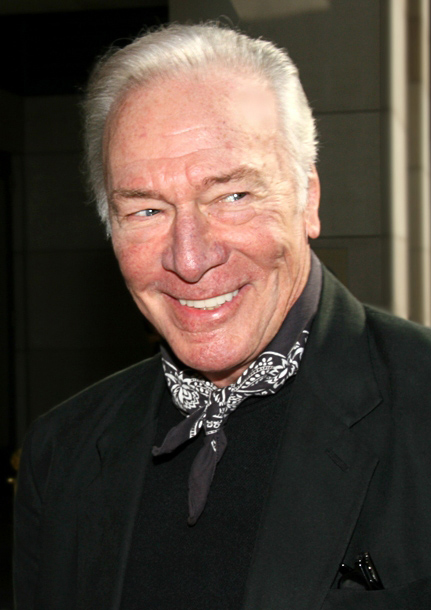
Plummer in 2007

One of Plummer's most critically acclaimed roles was that of television journalist Mike Wallace in Michael Mann's biographical film The Insider (1999), for which he was honoured with several critics' awards for Best Supporting Actor, though a corresponding Academy Award nomination did not materialize. Plummer's other turns from this period include his roles as Dr. Rosen in Ron Howard's Academy Award-winning biographical film A Beautiful Mind (2001), Uncle Ralph to the title character in the 2002 film adaptation of Charles Dickens novel Nicholas Nickleby, Arthur Case in Spike Lee's film Inside Man (2006), and the philosopher Aristotle in Alexander, alongside Colin Farrell. In 2004, Plummer briefly played John Adams Gates in the Disney adventure film National Treasure. He also appeared in Stephen Gaghan's drama Syriana (2005), the romantic comedy Must Love Dogs (2005), Terrence Malick's historical drama The New World (2005), and the romantic drama The Lake House (2006). In 2009, Plummer gave a voice performance for Pixar's animated film Up where he played the antagonistic character Charles Muntz. That same year he also lent his voice in Tim Burton-produced action/science fiction film 9 playing elder leader 1, and portrayed the titular character in Terry Gilliam's fantasy film The Imaginarium of Doctor Parnassus.

In 2000, Plummer played Sir David Maxwell Fyfe in the Primetime Emmy Award-winning Nuremberg (2000) alongside Alec Baldwin, Brian Cox and Max Von Sydow, and the 1976 Emmy-winning The Moneychangers (for which he won his first Emmy Award as Outstanding Lead Actor in a Limited Series). That same year he co-starred in American Tragedy as F. Lee Bailey (for which he received a Golden Globe Award nomination), and appeared in TV movie Four Minutes, Miracle Planet, and a documentary by Ric Burns about Eugene O'Neill. He received an Emmy Award nomination for his performance in Our Fathers and reunited with Julie Andrews for a television production of On Golden Pond. He was the narrator for The Gospel of John, a film adaptation of the complete Biblical book. Plummer appeared as a presenter in the CPAC documentary series The Prime Ministers in 2004. He appeared in the third episode, "John Abbott" (as Plummer is Abbott's great-grandson).

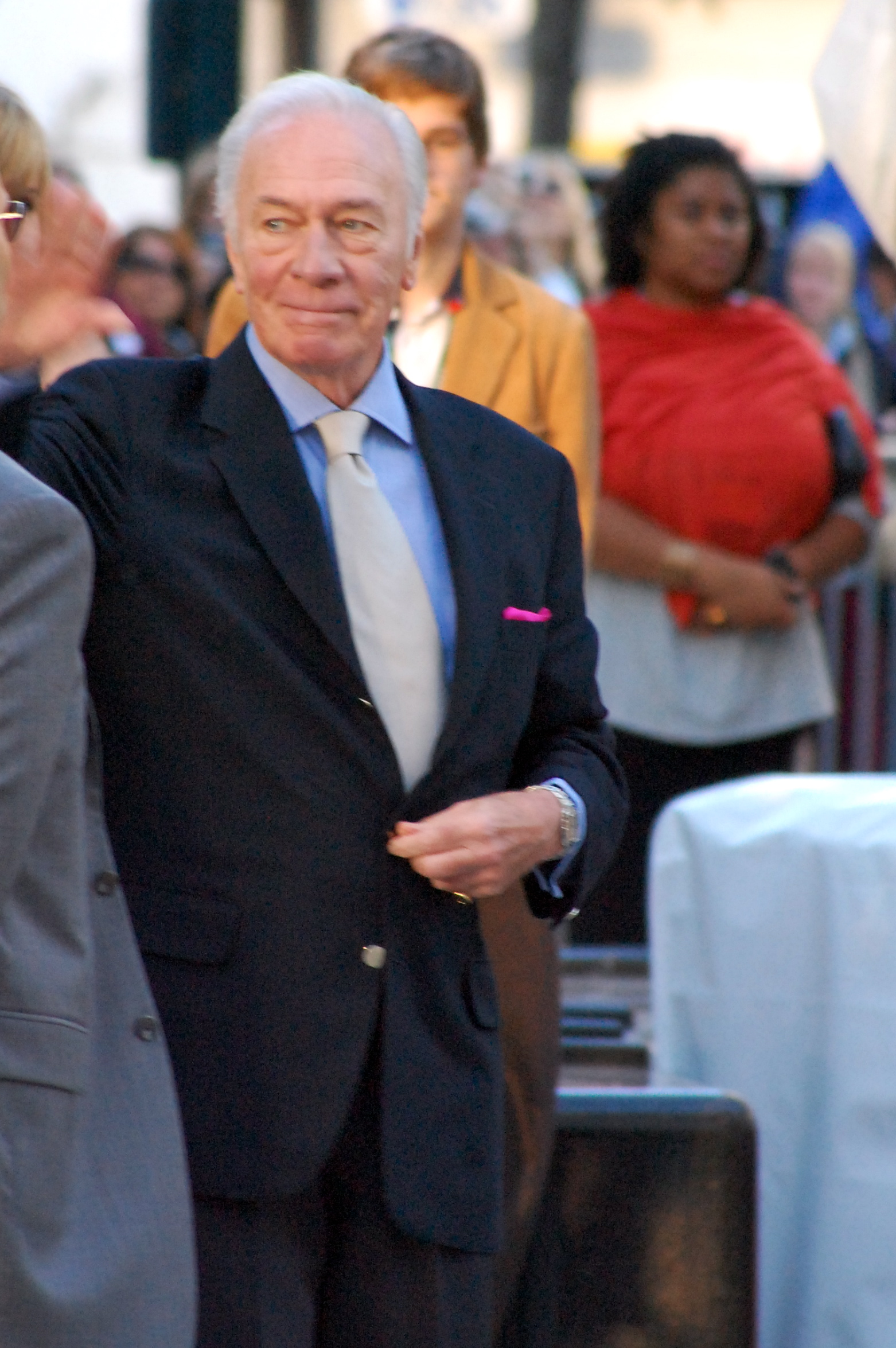
Plummer at the premiere for The Imaginarium of Doctor Parnassus, 2009

In 2002, he appeared in a lauded production of King Lear, directed by Jonathan Miller. The production successfully transferred to New York City's Lincoln Center in 2004. He was nominated for a Tony Award and a Drama Desk Award for his 2004 King Lear and for a Tony Award playing Henry Drummond in the 2007 revival of Inherit the Wind. He returned to the stage at the Stratford Shakespeare Festival in August 2008 in a critically acclaimed performance as Julius Caesar in George Bernard Shaw's Caesar and Cleopatra directed by Tony Award winner Des McAnuff; this production was videotaped and shown in high definition in Canadian cinemas on January 31, 2009 (with an encore presentation on February 23, 2009) and broadcast on April 4, 2009, on Bravo! in Canada.

In 2009 and 2010, Plummer starred in two stage to screen adaptations of the Stratford Festival productions of George Bernard Shaw's Caesar and Cleopatra and William Shakespeare's The Tempest. Both plays were directed for the stage by Des McAnuff and produced by Barry Avrich. The Tempest won Plummer a Canadian Screen award for Best Performance in a Performing Arts Program. Plummer returned to the Stratford Festival in the summer of 2010 in The Tempest as the lead character, Prospero (also videotaped and shown in high definition in cinemas), and again in the summer of 2012 in the one-man show, A Word or Two, an autobiographical exploration of his love of literature. In 2014, Plummer presented A Word or Two again, at the Ahmanson Theatre in Los Angeles.

=== 2010–2021: Resurgence and final roles ===
In January 2010, Plummer received his first Academy Award nomination for his portrayal of author Leo Tolstoy in The Last Station (2009). Speaking to the Canadian Broadcasting Corporation in an interview that aired on March 7, 2010, Plummer added, tongue-in-cheek, "Well, I said it's about time! I mean, I'm 80 years old, for God's sake. Have mercy." On Oscar night, March 7, 2010, however, he lost to Christoph Waltz. That same year, Plummer appeared in David Fincher's English-language film adaptation of Stieg Larsson's book The Girl with the Dragon Tattoo starring Daniel Craig, Rooney Mara and Stellan Skarsgård. The film was a critical and commercial success. Earlier that year, Plummer received his second nomination for the Academy Award for Best Supporting Actor for his performance in Mike Mills' independent comedy drama film Beginners (2011) starring Ewan McGregor and Mélanie Laurent. Plummer was announced as the winner at the 84th Academy Awards. Plummer's win made him, at age 82, the oldest actor to win an Academy Award. When he accepted the award, he quipped: "You're only two years older than me, darling. Where have you been all my life?"

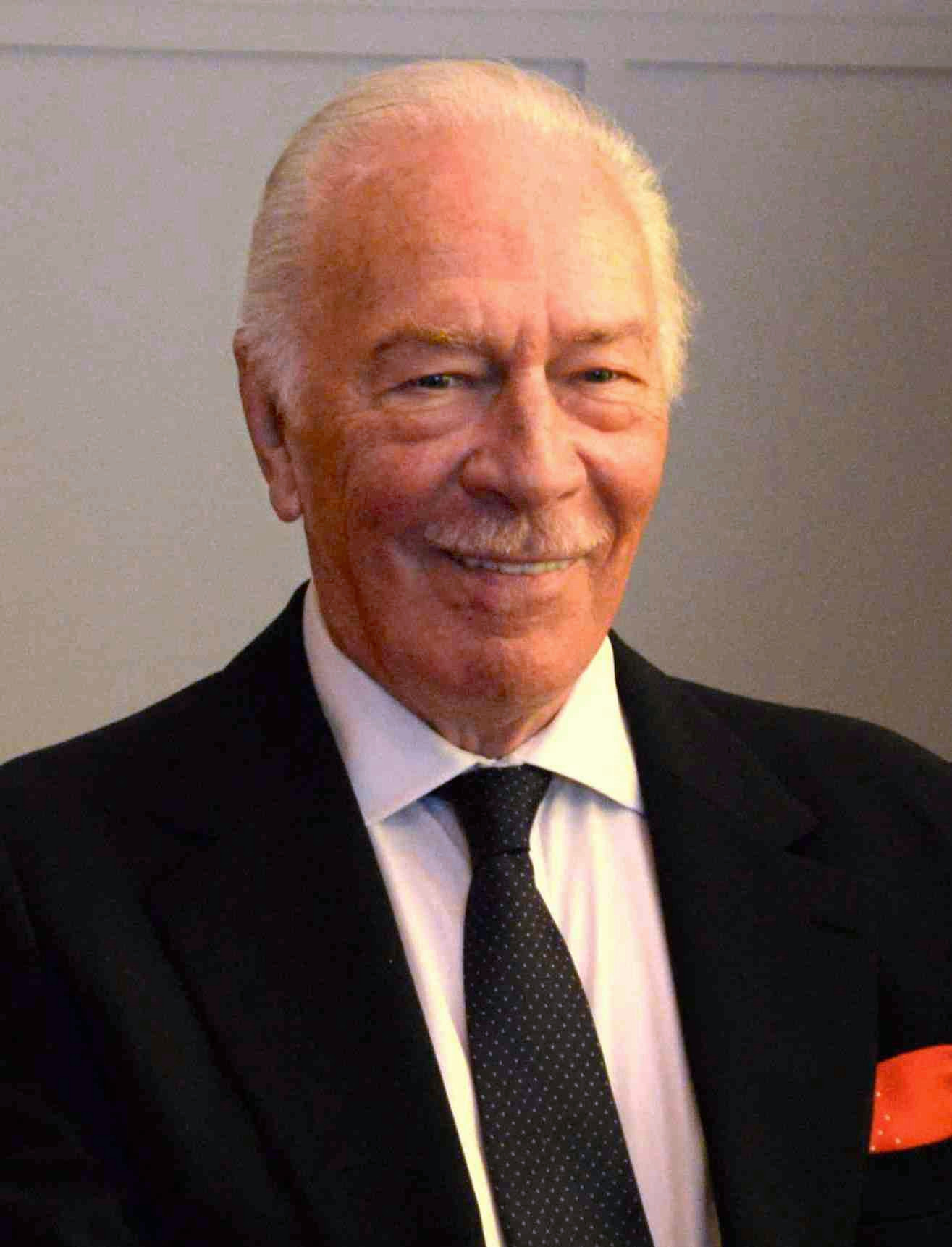
Plummer in 2014

In 2011, he appeared in the feature-length documentary The Captains. The film, written and directed by William Shatner, sees Shatner interview Plummer at the Stratford Shakespeare Festival Theatre where they talk about their young careers, long lasting friendship, and Plummer's role as Chang in Star Trek VI. The film references that Shatner, two years Plummer's junior, was the other's understudy in a production of Henry V at the Stratford Shakespeare Festival. When Plummer had fallen ill, Shatner took the stage, earning his first big break. Plummer voiced Arngeir, speaker for the Greybeards, in the video game The Elder Scrolls V: Skyrim. In 2015, he starred in the Atom Egoyan-directed thriller Remember, alongside Martin Landau and Bruno Ganz. Plummer played Ebenezer Scrooge in The Man Who Invented Christmas (2017), which is based on Charles Dickens' novella A Christmas Carol.

In November 2017, Plummer, who was director Ridley Scott's original choice to play J. Paul Getty in All the Money in the World, was cast to replace Kevin Spacey in the then-already completed film. The move came amid numerous sexual misconduct allegations made against Spacey. All scenes that had included Spacey were re-shot with Plummer. Co-stars Mark Wahlberg and Michelle Williams were part of the necessary filming. The decision was made not long before the scheduled release date of December 22. TriStar Pictures intended to meet that release date in spite of the tight re-shooting and editing schedule; it was eventually pushed back to December 25. For his performance, Plummer was nominated for the Golden Globe, British Academy Film Award and Academy Award nominations for Best Supporting Actor. Eric Kohn of IndieWire wrote of his performance, "Plummer is a world-class performer who endows Getty with a smarmy obstinance that aligns with the movie’s blunt storytelling".

He starred in the Rian Johnson directed mystery thriller ensemble film Knives Out (2019) alongside Ana de Armas, Daniel Craig, Chris Evans, Don Johnson, Jamie Lee Curtis, Lakeith Stanfield and Michael Shannon. Plummer plays Harlan Thrombey, a wealthy mystery novelist whose family is celebrating his 85th birthday party when a death occurs. The film premiered at the 2019 Toronto International Film Festival to positive reviews. It was an immense box office success. It was selected by the American Film Institute and the National Board of Review as one of the top ten films of 2019. At the age of 89, he appeared in a leading role in Departure, a 2019 Canadian-British TV series by Global for NBCUniversal about the disappearance of a trans-Atlantic flight. Plummer was set to return to Departure for season 2. Due to the COVID-19 pandemic and Canadian travel lockdown, he filmed his parts from his home in Connecticut, instead of venturing to Toronto, in 2020 and 2021. He completed his filming for the second season shortly before his death. In 2021, Plummer was set to play the lead for a film adaptation of Shakespeare's King Lear, to be filmed in the summer, in Newfoundland, under director Des McAnuff. He died before filming commenced.

== Other works ==
Plummer wrote for the stage, television and concert-hall. He and Sir Neville Marriner rearranged William Shakespeare's Henry V with Sir William Walton's music as a concert piece. They recorded the work with Marriner's chamber orchestra the Academy of St Martin in the Fields. He performed it and other works with the New York Philharmonic and symphony orchestras of London, Washington, D.C., Cleveland, Philadelphia, Chicago, Minneapolis, Toronto, Vancouver and Halifax. With Marriner, he made his Carnegie Hall debut in his own arrangements of Mendelssohn's incidental music to A Midsummer Night's Dream.

== Personal life ==
Plummer was married three times. His first wife, whom he married in 1956, was actress Tammy Grimes. Their marriage lasted four years, and they had a daughter together, actress Amanda Plummer.

He was next married to entertainment journalist Patricia Lewis. Prior to their marriage, they were involved in a major car crash outside Buckingham Palace after leaving The Establishment club in Soho (owned by comedian-actor Peter Cook). Plummer was uninjured, but Lewis was in a coma for several weeks. They married May 4, 1962, after her recovery and were divorced in 1967.

Three years after his second divorce, Plummer married actress Elaine Taylor on October 2, 1970. They lived in Weston, Connecticut. Plummer had no children with either his second or third wife.

Plummer's memoir, In Spite of Myself, was published by Alfred A. Knopf in November 2008. He was a patron of Canada's Theatre Museum (formerly Theatre Museum Canada), and a member of The Players social club in New York City.

== Death and legacy ==
Plummer died at his home in Weston, on February 5, 2021, at the age of 91. According to Taylor, he died two and a half weeks after a fall that resulted in a blow to the head. A statement released by the family announced that Plummer had died peacefully with Taylor by his side.

Following the announcement of his death, his The Sound of Music co-star Julie Andrews paid tribute:

The world has lost a consummate actor today and I have lost a cherished friend. I treasure the memories of our work together and all the humour and fun we shared through the years.

Elijah Wood, Helen Mirren, Taylor Hackford, George Takei, Antonio Banderas, Joseph Gordon-Levitt, Chris Evans, Rian Johnson, Ana de Armas, William Shatner, Russell Crowe, John Cusack, Jamie Lee Curtis, Ridley Scott, Ted Danson, Daniel Dae Kim and many more also paid their tributes to Plummer online.

Lou Pitt, Plummer's manager of 46 years, said in a statement:

Chris was an extraordinary man who deeply loved and respected his profession with great old fashion manners, self-deprecating humor and the music of words. He was a national treasure who deeply relished his Canadian roots. Through his art and humanity, he touched all of our hearts and his legendary life will endure for all generations to come. He will forever be with us.

A postage stamp paying tribute to Christopher Plummer was released by Canada Post on October 13, 2021.

== Awards and honours ==
Plummer is one of the few performers to have received the Triple Crown of Acting, and he is the only Canadian to accomplish this feat. He has received an Academy Award, two Primetime Emmy Awards and two Tony Awards. He has also received a BAFTA Award, a Golden Globe Award, an Independent Spirit Award and Screen Actors Guild Award.

In 2012, he won the Academy Award for Best Supporting Actor at the age of 82 for Beginners (2011), becoming the oldest person to win an acting award from the Academy of Motion Picture Arts and Sciences (a distinction he held until being supplanted by 83-year-old Anthony Hopkins in 2021), and he also received an Oscar nomination at the age of 88 for All the Money in the World, making him the oldest person to be nominated in any acting category at the Academy Awards.

Plummer has been recognized by the Academy of Motion Picture Arts and Sciences (AMPAS) for the following performances:

- 82nd Academy Awards: Best Actor in a Supporting Role, nominee, The Last Station (2009)
- 84th Academy Awards: Best Actor in a Supporting Role, winner, Beginners (2011)
- 90th Academy Awards: Best Actor in a Supporting Role, nominee, All the Money in the World (2017)

In 2016, Plummer received the Canadian Screen Award for Lifetime Achievement. (Note: Received in 2016 awards ceremony, held in 2017) Over his distinguished career he received numerous honours from Canada. In 1968, he was invested as Companion of the Order of Canada, at the time among Canada's highest civilian honours. In 2001, he received the Governor General's Performing Arts Award for Lifetime Artistic Achievement, Canada's highest honour in the performing arts. He was made an honorary Doctor of Fine Arts at New York's Juilliard School and has received honorary doctorates from the University of Toronto, Ryerson University (now Toronto Metropolitan University), McGill University, the University of Western Ontario, the University of Ottawa, and most recently the University of Guelph. Plummer was inducted into the American Theatre Hall of Fame in 1986 and into Canada's Walk of Fame in Toronto in 1998. He was a member of the Academy of Motion Picture Arts and Sciences in the Actor's Branch from 2007.

== See also ==
- List of EGOT nominees
- Triple Crown of Acting – Winners of the three main U.S. awards
- List of actors in Royal Shakespeare Company productions
- List of Canadian Academy Award winners and nominees
