= The Devil's Disciple (play) =

Play by George Bernard Shaw

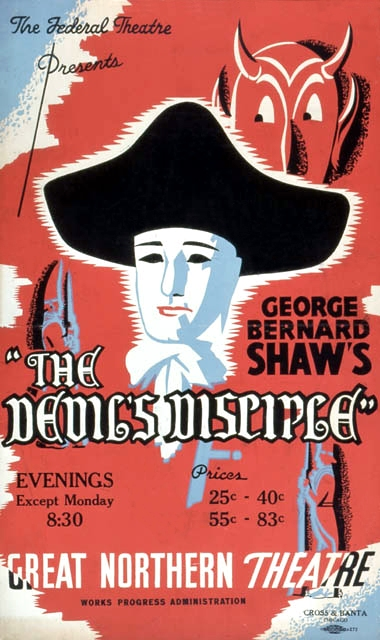
- Poster from the Federal Theatre Project, Work Projects Administration production, November 1937
- Original language: English
- Written by: George Bernard Shaw
- Genre: Drama
- Setting: Websterbridge, New Hampshire, 1777

Premiere
- Date: 1897
- Place: New York

The Devil's Disciple is an 1897 play written by Irish dramatist George Bernard Shaw. The play is Shaw's eighth, and after Richard Mansfield's original 1897 American production it was his first financial success, which helped to affirm his career as a playwright. It was published in Shaw's 1901 collection Three Plays for Puritans together with Captain Brassbound's Conversion and Caesar and Cleopatra. Set in Colonial America during the Revolutionary era, the play tells the story of Richard Dudgeon, a local outcast and self-proclaimed "Devil's disciple". In a twist characteristic of Shaw's love of paradox, Dudgeon sacrifices himself in a Christ-like gesture despite his professed infernal allegiance.

== Plot summary ==
The setting is in the Fall of 1777, during the Saratoga Campaign.

=== Act I ===
Richard (Dick) Dudgeon is an outcast from his family in colonial Websterbridge, New Hampshire. He returns their hatred with scorn. After the death of his father, Dick returns to his childhood home to hear the reading of his father's will, much to his family's dismay. Anthony Anderson, the local minister, treats him with courtesy despite Dick's self-proclaimed apostasy, but Dick's "wickedness" appalls Anderson's wife Judith. To everyone's surprise, it is revealed that Dick's father secretly changed his will just before he died, leaving the bulk of his estate to Dick. Dick promptly evicts his mother from her home, but also invites his cousin Essie (the illegitimate daughter of Dick's never-do-well uncle Peter), orphaned by the hanging of her father as a rebel by the British, to stay as long as she wants. At the end of the Act, Dick proclaims himself also a rebel against the British and scorns his family as cowards when they flee his home. He warns Anderson that the approaching army hanged his uncle in error, believing him to be a man of highest respect, unaware of his ill repute, and that Anderson will be the example set in Websterbridge.

=== Act II ===
While visiting Anderson's home at the Reverend's invitation, Dick is left alone with Judith while Anderson is called out to Mrs. Dudgeon's deathbed. Perceiving Judith's distaste for him, Dick attempts to leave, but Judith insists he stay until Anderson returns. While they are waiting, British soldiers enter Anderson's home and arrest Dick, mistaking him for Anderson. Dick allows them to take him away without revealing his actual identity. He swears Judith to secrecy lest her husband give the secret away and expose himself to arrest. Anderson returns and finds his wife in a state of great agitation. He demands to know if Dick has harmed her. Breaking her promise to Dick, Judith reveals that soldiers came to arrest Anderson but Dick went in his place. Anderson is stunned. He grabs all his money and a gun and quickly rides away, ignoring Judith's appeals. Judith believes her husband to be a coward, while Dick, whom she despised, is a hero.

=== Act III ===
Dick is being held for court martial at the local British Army headquarters. Judith visits Dick and asks to be present at his trial. He allows it as long as she promises not to speak up. The proceedings are run by the charming British General Burgoyne. After some back and forth, where, among other things, Dick makes treasonous statements, it is decided the prisoner will be hanged at noon. Judith can no longer hold her tongue and tells the court Dick is not her husband, but this makes no difference—the sentence will still be carried out. The action moves to the gallows at the Websterbridge market place, where Dick is soon to be hanged. He is saved at the last second, however, by Anderson, now the commander of a militia that has won the day.

== Original New York cast ==
Fifth Avenue Theatre October 4, 1897

- Anthony Anderson .. Benjamin Johnson
- Judith Anderson .. Beatrice Cameron
- Anne Dudgeon .. Minna Monk
- Richard "Dick" Dudgeon .. Richard Mansfield
- Christopher Dudgeon .. A. G. Andrews
- Uncle William Dudgeon .. W. H. Griffith
- Uncle Titus Dudgeon .. Le Fevre
- Essie .. Lottie Briscoe
- Lawyer Hawkins .. Hunter
- General Burgoyne .. Arthur Forrest
- Major Swindon .. Joseph Wearer
- Rev. Mr. Brudenell .. William Courtenay
- A Sergeant .. Francis Kingdon

== Adaptations ==
A 1955 television broadcast featured Ralph Bellamy as Anthony Anderson, Maurice Evans (who also co-wrote the screenplay) as Dick Dudgeon, Teresa Wright as Judith Anderson, Dennis King as General Burgoyne, and Margaret Hamilton as Mrs. Dudgeon.

A 1959 film adaptation featured Burt Lancaster as Reverend Anthony Anderson, Kirk Douglas as Dick Dudgeon, Janette Scott as Judith Anderson, and Laurence Olivier as General Burgoyne.

A 1976 BBC Radio 3 broadcast featured Tony Church as General Burgoyne, James Laurenson as Dick Dudgeon, Tenniel Evans as Anthony Anderson and Lucy Fleming as Judith Anderson. The programme was subsequently re-broadcast on BBC Radio 7, later BBC Radio 4 Extra, in 2009, 2010, and 2011.

The BBC broadcast a 1987 television film on Theatre Night on 17 May with Patrick Stewart as Anthony Anderson, Mike Gwilym as Dick Dudgeon, Susan Wooldridge as Judith Anderson, and Ian Richardson as General Burgoyne.

Gingold Theatrical Group in 2024 presented an adaptation penned by David Staller. The production reduced the original thirteen-person cast to five characters all played by women. The production was nominated for Outstanding Adaptation at the 69th Annual Drama Desk Awards.

At Southwark Playhouse in 2025 The Devil May Care was an adaptation by Mark Giesser that moved the story to The Philippines in 1899.
