= Three Plays for Puritans =

Three Plays for Puritans is a collection of plays by George Bernard Shaw published in January 1901.

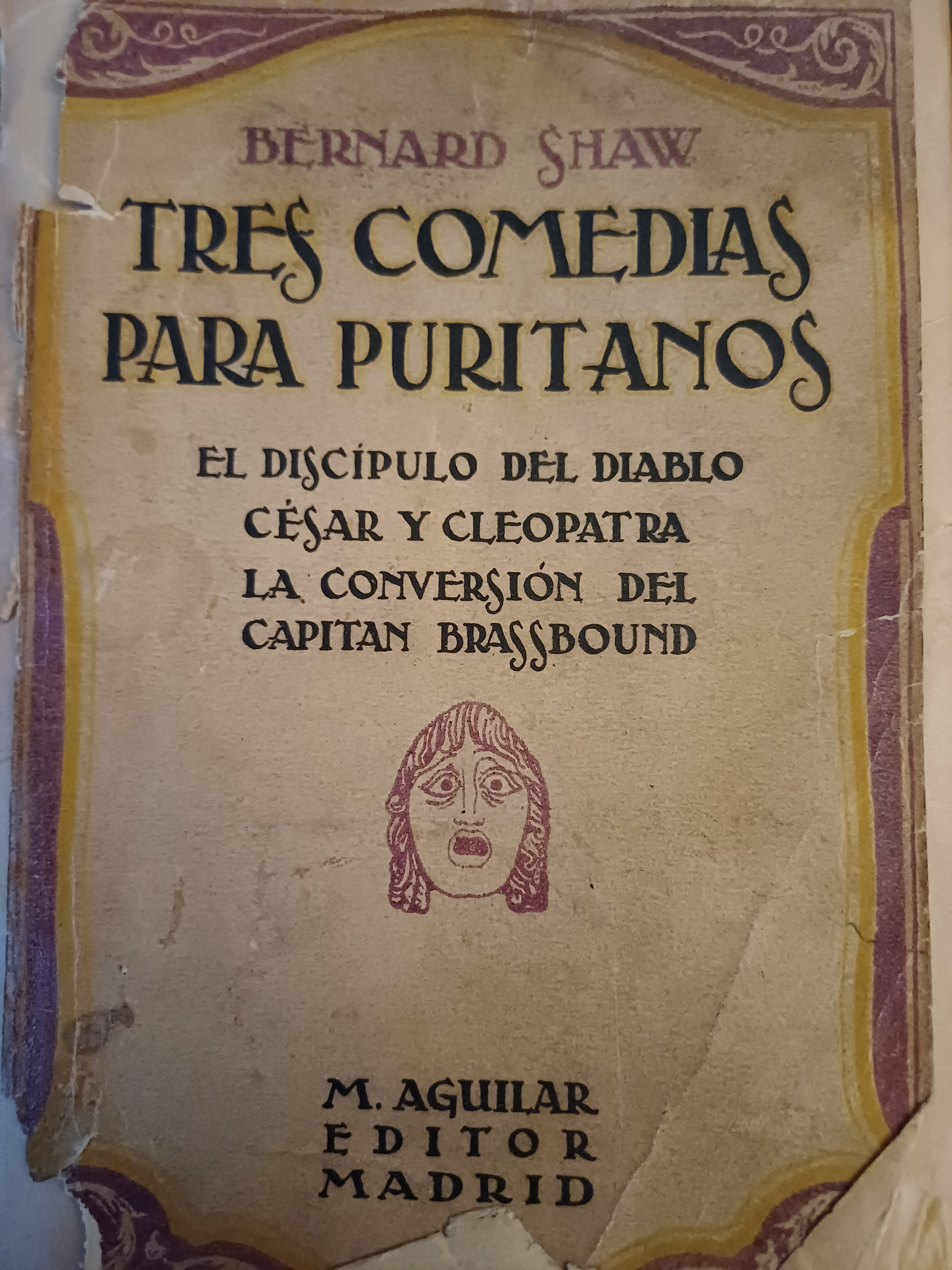
The three plays in Spanish translation

It consists of The Devil's Disciple (1897), Caesar and Cleopatra (1898) and Captain Brassbound's Conversion (1900), with a long preface by Shaw in three parts in which he expounds many of his thoughts on drama. In the preface, Shaw also introduced the term "bardolatry," to describe excessive admiration for Shakespeare.
