= Isabella Mary Abbott =

Canadian artist

- Born: Isabella Mary Abbott; December 23, 1890; Quebec City, Quebec, Canada
- Died: November 26, 1955 (aged 64); Montreal, Quebec, Canada
- Spouse: John Orme Plummer (m. 1929; sep. 1929)
- Children: Christopher Plummer
- Relatives: Amanda Plummer (granddaughter)

Isabella Mary Abbott (December 23, 1890 – November 26, 1955) was a Canadian artist and the mother of actor Christopher Plummer.

== Life ==
Abbott was born in Quebec City, the daughter of Marianne J. (née Campbell) and Arthur Edward Abbott, and the granddaughter of former Prime Minister Sir John Abbott. She exhibited with the Art Association of Montreal before showing her work with the Royal Canadian Academy in 1922 and 1923. Abbott served as a volunteer nurse in France during World War I. She worked with the Canadian Handicrafts Guild as the secretary-treasurer from 1924 until February 1929. Abbott was also secretary to the dean of Sciences at McGill University. Abbott returned to work with the Guild in the 1950s, working until her death in 1955.

== Family ==
She married John Orme Plummer (1894–1977) in Quebec City in February 1929. Their only child, actor Arthur Christopher Orme Plummer, was born on December 13 of that year, in Toronto. The couple had separated by the end of the year.

American actress Amanda Plummer is their granddaughter.
