= Ulterior Motive =

Ulterior Motive or Ulterior Motives may refer to:

- Ulterior Motive (film), a 2015 Chinese action thriller film
- "Spiral" / "Ulterior Motive", a 2003 single by Pendulum
- Ulterior Motives (film), also known as Kill Fee, a 1993 martial arts action thriller film
- "Ulterior Motives" (song), a 1986 song by Christopher and Philip Booth that achieved notoriety as an example of "Lostwave"
