= A Doll's House (1959 film) =

1959 television film by George Schaefer

- Based on: A Doll's House by Henrik Ibsen
- Written by: James Costigan
- Directed by: George Schaefer
- Starring: Julie Harris; Christopher Plummer
- Country of origin: United States
- Original language: English

Production
- Producer: George Schaefer
- Running time: 90 minutes
- Production company: Hallmark Hall of Fame Productions

Original release
- Network: NBC
- Release: November 15, 1959

A Doll's House is an American drama television film that premiered on NBC on November 15, 1959, as part of the Hallmark Hall of Fame anthology series. It is directed and produced by George Schaefer, from a teleplay by James Costigan, based on Henrik Ibsen's classic play of the same name. The film stars Julie Harris and Christopher Plummer, who previously co-starred in Little Moon of Alban.

== Plot ==
Nora Helmer has years earlier committed a forgery in order to save the life of her authoritarian husband Torvald. Now she is being blackmailed and lives in fear of her husband's finding out and of the shame such a revelation would bring to his career. But when the truth comes out, Nora is shocked to learn where she really stands in her husband's esteem.

== Cast ==
- Julie Harris as Nora Helmer
- Christopher Plummer as Torvald Helmer
- Hume Cronyn as Nils Krogstad
- Eileen Heckart as Kristine Linde
- Jason Robards Jr. as Dr. Rank
- Katharine Raht as Anne-Marie
- Mildred Trares as Helene
- Maggie King as Emmy
- Randy Gaynes as Bobby
- Richard E. Thomas as Ivor
