= Miracle Planet =

- Starring: Christopher Plummer (narrator)
- Country of origin: Japan
- Original languages: Japanese, English
- No. of episodes: 6

Production
- Running time: 300 minutes (approx.)

Original release
- Network: Science Channel

Miracle Planet is a six-part documentary series, co-produced by Japan's NHK and the National Film Board of Canada (NFB), narrated by Christopher Plummer (Seiko Nakajo in the original Japanese), which tells the 4.6-billion-year-old story of how life has evolved from its humble beginnings to the diversity of living creatures today. It is a remake of the 1989 series produced by NHK and KCTS.

Filmed around the world and based upon the most recent scientific findings, Miracle Planet combines location footage and interviews with leading scientists, along with computer animation, to depict the cataclysmic events that have shaped our planet and all of the life-forms within it.

The five standard episodes depict the evolution of life on Earth in perspective with our place in the universe - from the simplest microbes to the complexity and diversity that is found on the planet today. The entire 5-hour series Miracle Planet aired on Discovery Channel in Canada on April 22, 2005 as an Earth Day special. The music was composed by Daniel Toussaint, and orchestrated by Daniel Toussaint.

== Episodes ==
(Fifty minutes each)

=== The Violent Past ===
This episode chronicles the early stages of the Earth's history, from formation to the mid-Precambrian. It discusses the beginning of life on earth, mentioning panspermia as a possible candidate. It then simulates a collision with an asteroid 500 km (310 mi) wide, similar to those that formed the protoplanets.

=== Snowball Earth ===
This episode mainly focuses on the two Snowball Earth events in the mid-Precambrian period, and the effect they had on life. It simulates a similar occurrence in the modern day. Animals included: Pteridinium, Yorgia, Kimberella, Arandaspis, Trilobites, Chain Coral (fossil) and Dicranurus (fossil)

=== New Frontiers ===
Full title: "The Evolution of Our World: New Frontiers". This episode follows our ancestors from the shallow saltwater seas to the freshwater rivers, then discusses the colonization of land. Mainly Devonian and Carboniferous. Animals included: Eusthenopteron, Dunkleosteus (identified as a placoderm), Acanthostega, Hyneria, Pederpes, Dinocephalian, Gorgonops, Diictodon (fossil), and Cynodont.

=== Extinction and Rebirth ===
This episode centres on the Permian to Tertiary periods, showing numerous extinctions, including the Siberian Traps event 250 mya and the Chicxulub asteroid impact 66 mya. It also shows the rise of new forms of life after each event. Animals included: Apatosaurus, Allosaurus, Cynodont, Thrinaxodon, Eomaia, Carpolestes, Diatryma, Hyracotherium and Hyaenodontid.

=== Survival of the Fittest ===
This episode chronicles primates that would evolve to become humans and why the Cro-Magnons succeeded over Neanderthals. Species included: Shoshonius, Catopithecus, Australopithecus africanus, Paranthropus robustus, Homo ergaster, and Hypoxis.

=== Life Indestructible (Special Episode) ===
Earth provides a rich environment, and many factors continue to shape the planet's condition. This episode is a summary of the previous five, condensed into a single hour.
