= Caesar and Cleopatra (play) =

Play by George Bernard Shaw

- Gertrude Elliott and Johnston Forbes-Robertson in Caesar and Cleopatra, New York, 1906
- Written by: Bernard Shaw
- Subject: Julius Caesar meets Cleopatra
- Setting: Ancient Egypt

Premiere
- Date: 15 March 1899
- Place: Theatre Royal, Newcastle upon Tyne

Caesar and Cleopatra (Shavian: ·𐑕𐑰𐑟𐑩𐑮 𐑨𐑯𐑛 ·𐑒𐑤𐑰𐑩𐑫𐑐𐑨𐑑𐑮𐑩) is a play written in 1898 by George Bernard Shaw that depicts a fictionalised account of the relationship between Julius Caesar and Cleopatra. It was first published with Captain Brassbound's Conversion and The Devil's Disciple in Shaw's 1901 collection Three Plays for Puritans. Shaw based his plot on Theodor Mommsen's The History of Rome, which presents an admiring depiction of Caesar as a strong leader and great man, contrasting his piece with Shakespeare's Antony and Cleopatra, which was based on histories by Plutarch and Holinshed. Shaw focused on the background of Roman interference in the affairs of Alexandria, which he saw as akin to the British imperialism of his day. He also portrayed Cleopatra as sixteen years old to downplay the sexual relationship between the title characters and focus on the political story.

The play was first performed in a single staged reading at Newcastle upon Tyne in March 1899, to secure the copyright, starring Mrs Patrick Campbell and Nutcombe Gould, though Shaw said that he had written the role of Caesar with Johnston Forbes-Robertson in mind. Campbell resisted Shaw's concept of her character and portrayed it more maturely. It was not staged again until March 1906, when it was played unsuccessfully in Berlin in a German translation, with cuts. Shaw's text was fully given a full staging in New York later in 1906 and in London in 1907, both starring Gertrude Elliott and Forbes-Robertson.

Numerous productions followed over the decades, and the play has been adapted for cinema, radio, television and the musical stage. The part of Caesar has been played by such actors as Alan Badel, John Gielgud, Alec Guinness, Cedric Hardwicke, Rex Harrison, Laurence Olivier, Christopher Plummer, Claude Rains and Godfrey Tearle. Cleopatras have included Peggy Ashcroft, Claire Bloom, Gwen Ffrangcon-Davies, Vivien Leigh, Lilli Palmer, Vanessa Redgrave and Dorothy Tutin.

== Background and first productions ==
Shaw objected to the general adulation of Shakespeare, which he dubbed "Bardolatry", and set his own Caesar and Cleopatra against Antony and Cleopatra, claiming that his characters were "real" as opposed to Shakespeare's, who were "love-obsessed". In an appraisal of Julius Caesar for The Saturday Review, Shaw expressed his "revulsion of indignant contempt at this travestying of a great man as a silly braggart".

Shaw began writing the play in April 1898 and finished it by the end of the year. He based his plot on Theodor Mommsen's The History of Rome. He said, "I took the chronicle without alteration from Mommsen ... I found that Mommsen had conceived Caesar as I wished to present him". In Mommsen’s admiring depiction of Caesar as "the entire and perfect man" Shaw found the model for his hero and said that he had stuck nearly as closely to Mommsen as Shakespeare had to Plutarch or Holinshed. He misconstrued Mommsen's account of Cleopatra's age when she met Caesar: Shaw made her sixteen – five years younger than the historical Cleopatra. This suited Shaw, who was anxious to ensure that there should be no hint of a sexual liaison between the title characters.

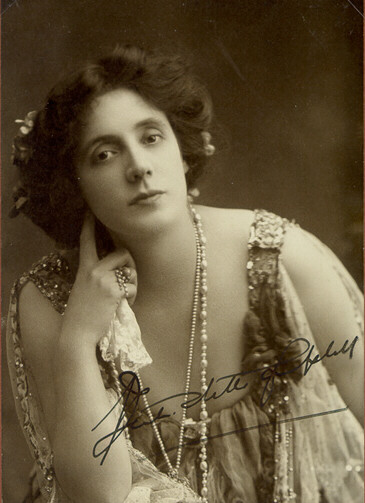
Mrs Patrick (Stella) Campbell

The part of Cleopatra was written with the actress Mrs Patrick Campbell ("Stella") in mind. She and her company gave the first performance of the play while on tour, in Newcastle – a one-off performance on 15 March to secure the British copyright of the play. She did not care for the piece, and particularly for Shaw's conception of Cleopatra: her biographer Margot Peters writes that she turned "Shaw's mere kitten of a Cleopatra into an experienced pantheress". According to Peters, "She did not appreciate Shaw’s anti-romantic drama with its wise and urbane Caesar spurning the petty wiles of a very young Cleopatra and gladly turning her over to Antony". Campbell realised that the central role was Caesar, and having recently played Ophelia to Johnston Forbes-Robertson's Hamlet she did not intend to play second fiddle again. When the play was published as one of Shaw's Three Plays for Puritans he inscribed a copy for her: "To silly Stella who threw Caesar and Cleopatra into the waste paper basket, from G. Bernard Shaw".

Forbes-Robertson's performance as Hamlet in 1897 had impressed Shaw. He later said, "I wrote Caesar and Cleopatra for Forbes-Robertson, because he is the classic actor of the day, and had a right to require such a service from me. Without him Caesar and Cleopatra would not have been written".

=== New York and London premieres ===
After its one-off copyright performance, the play was not staged until 1906, when Max Reinhardt presented it in a German translation in Berlin on 31 March 1906. The production was a failure, which Shaw attributed to the heavy cuts Reinhardt made in the text, rendering the action and the characters incomprehensible to audiences.

The first full staging of Shaw's text was on 30 October 1906 in the New Amsterdam Theatre, New York. It ran there during the rest of the year and the production was then moved to London, after a provincial try-out, opening at the Savoy Theatre on 25 November 1907, running until 21 December.

== Original casts ==
Johnston Forbes-Robertson as Caesar, 1906

	Newcastle	New York	London
Julius Caesar	Nutcombe Gould	Johnston Forbes-Robertson	Johnston Forbes-Robertson
Cleopatra	Mrs Patrick Campbell	Gertrude Elliott	Gertrude Elliott
Rufio	Courtney Thorpe	Percy Rhodes	Percy Rhodes
Britannus	Bromley Davenport	Ian Robertson	Ian Robertson
Lucius Septimus	Harley Granville Barker	Walter Ringham	Walter Ringham
Apollodorus	Berte Thomas	A. Hylton Allen	Lewis Willoughby
Ptolemy XIV	Robert Farquherson	Sidney Carlisle	Philip Tonge
Pothinus	Albert Gran	Charles Langley	Charles Langley
Theodotus	Harry Glover	Sam T. Pearce	Sam T. Pearce
Achillas	— Burchili	Halliwell Hobbes	John M. Troughton
Belzanor	Frank Cave	Charles Vaughn	A. W. Tyrer
Persian	E. Bertram	Charles Bibby	S. A. Cookson
Bel Affris	Harry Green	Vernon Steele	C. B. Vaughan
Professor of Music	Percy Reed	Frank Ridley	Frank Ridley
Major Domo	W. Rankin	J. Herbert Beaumont	A. Wheatman
Nubian Sentinel	Con O'Brien	Frank Bickley	Frank Bickley
Ftatateeta	Francis Ivor	Adeline Bourne	Elizabeth Watson
Charmian	Dorothy Hammond	Dorothy Paget	Dorothy Paget
Iras	Edith Yeoland	Esme Hubbard	Dora Harker

== Plot ==
Scene from London premiere, 1907: from left Gertrude Elliott (Cleopatra), Lewis Willoughby (Apollodorus), Percy Rhodes (Rufio), Johnston Forbes-Robertson (Caesar), A. Wheatman (Major Domo)

=== Act I ===
The teenage Cleopatra sleeps between the paws of a sphinx. Caesar, wandering in the desert night, comes upon the sphinx and speaks to it. Cleopatra wakes and, unseen, replies. At first Caesar imagines the sphinx is speaking. She, not recognising Caesar, thinks him a nice old man and tells him of her childish fear of Caesar and the Romans. Caesar urges bravery when she must face the conquerors, and then escorts her to her palace. Cleopatra reluctantly agrees to maintain a queenly presence, but fears that Caesar will nonetheless eat her. When the Roman guards arrive and hail Caesar, Cleopatra realises he has been with her all along. She sobs in relief, and falls into his arms.

=== Act II ===
In a hall in the royal palace in Alexandria, Caesar meets Cleopatra's younger brother, King Ptolemy and his retinue, including the king's Roman guardian, Pothinus. Caesar greets all with courtesy but demands a tribute whose amount disconcerts the Egyptians. He says he will settle the dispute between the claimants for the Egyptian throne by letting Cleopatra and Ptolemy reign jointly.

The Egyptians threaten military action against Caesar, who orders Rufio, his military aide, to take over the palace and other strategic spots including the Pharos lighthouse. Britannus, Caesar's secretary, proclaims Ptolemy and his courtiers prisoners of war, but Caesar permits the captives to depart. Only Cleopatra (with her retinue), fearing Ptolemy's associates, and Pothinus (for reasons of his own), choose to remain with Caesar. A siege is imminent; Caesar dons his armour and prepares for battle.

Caesar crowns Cleopatra, 1907 premiere

=== Act III ===
This act, which Shaw, conscious of the great length of the play, suggested could be omitted from productions, depicts the old legend of Cleopatra's smuggling herself into Caesar's presence in the Pharos lighthouse by hiding in a rolled-up carpet. The lighthouse comes under attack and Caesar and his entourage swim to a Roman ship in the eastern harbour, with Cleopatra clinging on to Caesar.

=== Act IV ===
Six months elapse with Romans and Cleopatra besieged in the palace in Alexandria. Cleopatra and Pothinus, who is a prisoner of war, discuss what will happen when Caesar eventually leaves and they disagree over whether Cleopatra or Ptolemy should rule. They part; Cleopatra to be hostess at a feast prepared for Caesar and his lieutenants, and Pothinus to tell Caesar that Cleopatra is a traitress who is only using Caesar to help her gain the Egyptian throne. Caesar considers that a natural motive and is not offended. But Cleopatra is enraged at Pothinus's allegation and secretly orders her nurse, Ftatateeta, to kill him, which she does, to the fury of the Egyptian populace, who begin storming the palace. Caesar draws up a battle plan and leaves to speak to his troops. Meanwhile, Rufio realises Ftatateeta was Pothinus's killer, and he kills her in turn. Cleopatra discovers the bloodied body concealed behind a curtain.

=== Act V ===
Caesar bids farewell to Cleopatra (1907 production)

Amid great pomp and ceremony, Caesar prepares to leave for Rome. His forces have swept Ptolemy's armies into the Nile, and Ptolemy himself was drowned when his barge sank. Caesar appoints Rufio governor of the province. As the gangplank is being extended from the quay to Caesar's ship, Cleopatra, dressed in mourning for her nurse, arrives. She accuses Rufio of murdering Ftatateeta. Rufio admits the killing, but says it was not for the sake of punishment, revenge or justice: he killed her without malice because she was a potential menace. Caesar approves of the execution because it was not influenced by spurious moralism. Cleopatra remains unforgiving until Caesar renews his earlier promise to send the young and dashing Mark Antony to Egypt. That renders her ecstatic as Caesar's ship starts moving out to sea.

== Critical reception ==
After the Broadway premiere The New York Times called the play "something to be thankful for" and praised the opening desert scene as "pure unadulterated fun, real comedy springing from a really comic idea".

H. L. Mencken wrote that Shaw makes Cleopatra a much more human character than Caesar. In Mencken's view Caesar shows too much "icy sang froid ... Shaw, in attempting to bring the great conqueror down to date, has rather expatriated him. He is scarcely a Roman". Mencken continued:

Cleopatra, on the contrary, is admirable. Shaw very frankly makes her an animal and her passion for Caesar is the backbone of the play. She is fiery, lustful and murderous; a veritable she-devil; and all the while an impressionable, superstitious, shadow-fearing child. In his masterly gallery of women's portraits – Mrs Warren, Blanche Sartorius, Candida, Ann Whitefield and their company – Cleopatra is by no means the least.

The Times, reviewing the West End premiere, remarked, "The essence of his 'history in four acts', as it is ironically styled in the playbill, is the uttering of modern thoughts, modern slang, and topical allusions of our own day by more or less historical persons of a remote age". The reviewer commented that in this Shaw was following in the footsteps of Offenbach's librettists Henri Meilhac and Ludovic Halévy – "the old, old burlesque producing its old laughs in its old way". The reviewer found some of the dialogue "not a little tedious" and Shaw's Caesar sometimes "very close to being a bore".

In a 1977 study of Shaw's plays on historical themes, R. N. Roy writes that Caesar and Cleopatra, published as one of the Three Plays for Puritans, "is a play for Puritans in that it is anti-romantic ... a counterblast to Shakespeare's Antony and Cleopatra in which unmitigated lust has been poetised into heroism". In Roy's view it does not matter that Shaw’s Caesar is not a faithful portrait of the historical character: "Caesar occupies a very prominent place in the portrait-gallery of Shaw. He is a fine realist, a sublime artistic creation, and it is immaterial that he is not an exact replica of the Caesar of history".

After a 1992 revival, The Stage commented:

The trouble with Caesar and Cleopatra, written in 1898, is that it belongs to an earlier Shavian era and uses the commonsensical approach to apologise in part for the iniquities of empire – Roman and British. In Shaw's chronicle, Caesar is a battle-weary philosopher in the stoical mould, draining Egypt's coffers with an air of benign condescension; Cleopatra is more minx than sphinx at first, but learns by example how to turn low cunning into political art. Both end by stifling their bloodied consciences with the proper classical dignity. Guilt and responsibility scarcely obtrude.

== Themes ==
Shaw had a long fascination with strong leaders, and later in his life he wrote approvingly of Mussolini, Stalin and Hitler, although he protested at "the silly complaint that I have collapsed into dictator-worship in my old age". At the time of Caesar and Cleopatra, according to his biographer Michael Holroyd he longed for strong leaders – men who were naturally great. The play was, according to Shaw, "the first & only dramatization of the greatest man that ever lived ... the projection on the stage of the hero in the big sense of the word". Shaw wanted to prove that it was not love but politics that drew Cleopatra to Caesar. He saw the Roman imperialism in ancient Egypt as similar to the British imperialism that was occurring during his time. Caesar understands the importance of good government, and values these things above art and love.

Shaw ignored the reality of Caesar's relationship with Cleopatra: within ten months of his arrival in Egypt the historical Caesar was the father of her son Caesarion.

== Revivals ==
Gwen Ffrangcon-Davies as Cleopatra, 1925

- 1913: Caesar and Cleopatra was revived at the Theatre Royal, Drury Lane in April. Forbes-Robertson and Elliott reprised their roles.
- 1925: In New York, the Theatre Guild presented the play to open its new playhouse, with Lionel Atwill and Helen Hayes in the title roles.
- 1925: Barry Jackson presented a new production at the Kingsway Theatre in May. His Birmingham Repertory company was headed by Cedric Hardwicke and Gwen Ffrangcon-Davies in the title roles.
- 1932: In a revival at the Old Vic in September 1932, directed by Harcourt Williams, Malcolm Keen and Peggy Ashcroft took the title roles, with a supporting cast that included Alastair Sim and Roger Livesey.
- 1949: Hardwicke, Lilli Palmer, and Bertha Belmore starred in a production at the National Theatre on Broadway.
- 1951: Laurence Olivier and Vivien Leigh played the title roles in repertory with Shakespeare's Antony and Cleopatra at the St James's Theatre, London, and later on Broadway.
- 1956: A second production by the Birmingham Repertory company played at the Old Vic in July. Geoffrey Bayldon and Doreen Aris played Caesar and Cleopatra, with Bernard Hepton and Ronald Hines in supporting roles.
- 1971: John Gielgud played Caesar at the Chichester Festival opposite Anna Calder-Marshall, with a supporting cast including Harold Innocent, Michael Aldridge, Hubert Gregg and Peter Egan. Gielgud had been Shaw's first choice for the role in the 1945 film but the actor declined the offer after meeting the director Gabriel Pascal and taking an instant dislike to him.
- 1977: Rex Harrison played Caesar on Broadway, recreating his Academy Award-nominated role from the film Cleopatra (1963). Elizabeth Ashley portrayed Cleopatra.
- 1983: Douglas Rain played Caesar and Marti Maraden Cleopatra in a Shaw Festival production.
- 1992: Alec McCowen and Amanda Root played the title roles in a revival at the Greenwich Theatre, London.
- 2008: A Stratford Shakespeare Festival production, directed by Des McAnuff, starred Christopher Plummer as Caesar and Nikki M. James as Cleopatra. The production was filmed and also streamed live to numerous cinemas in Canada.
- 2019: A production by The Gingold Theatrical Group ran off-Broadway in the Theatre Row Building, starring Robert Cuccioli and Brenda Braxton.

== Film, television and audio versions ==
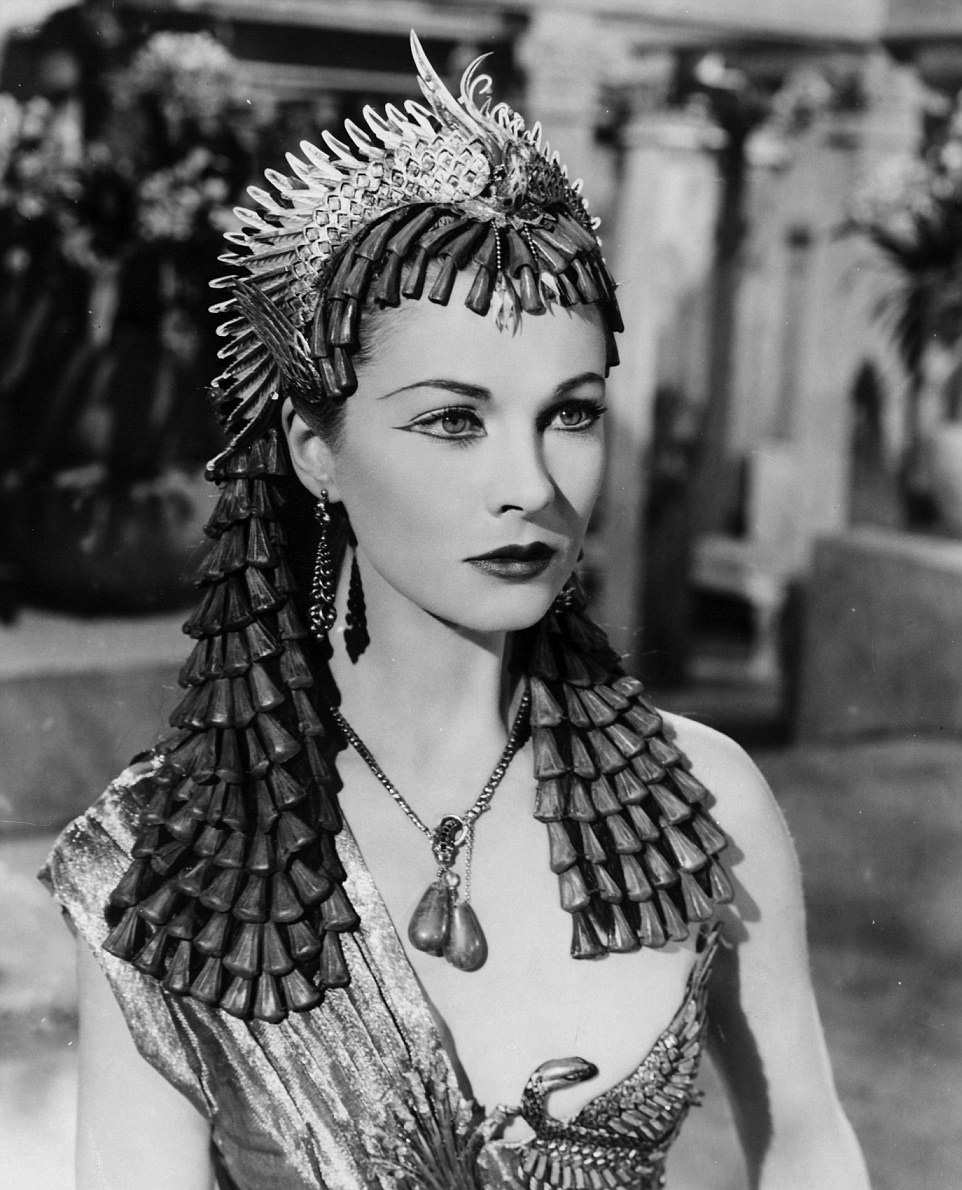
Vivien Leigh as Cleopatra

Shaw's play was the basis for the lavish 1945 motion picture Caesar and Cleopatra, starring Claude Rains as Caesar and Vivien Leigh as Cleopatra and produced by Gabriel Pascal. Shaw collaborated closely on this production. After seeing part of the filming of the movie at Denham Studios in London, Shaw remarked, "What scope! What limitless possibilities!... Here you have the whole world to play with!" The film cost three times its original budget and was rated "the biggest financial failure in the history of British cinema". It was poorly received by British critics, although American reviews were friendlier. Shaw was disappointed by the finished film; he thought its lavishness nullified the drama and he considered the result "a poor imitation of Cecil B. de Mille".

The play has been adapted for television. The first version was in 1956, on NBC, starring Cedric Hardwicke as Caesar and Claire Bloom as Cleopatra, with Cyril Ritchard, Farley Granger, Jack Hawkins and Judith Anderson. A second version from NBC in 1976, starred Alec Guinness as Caesar and Geneviève Bujold as Cleopatra, with Clive Francis, Margaret Courtenay and Iain Cuthbertson.

A 1965 audio adaptation of the play was produced by Caedmon Records and directed by Anthony Quayle, starring Max Adrian as Caesar and Claire Bloom as Cleopatra, with Judith Anderson as Ftatateeta, Corin Redgrave as Apollodorus, and Jack Gwillim as Rufio. This version used the Alternative Prologue.

BBC Radio has broadcast four adaptations of Caesar and Cleopatra:

- 1952, with Godfrey Tearle and Claire Bloom in the title roles.
- 1963, with Patrick Troughton and Vanessa Redgrave.
- 1966, with Maurice Denham and Dorothy Tutin.
- 1975, with Alan Badel as Caesar and Sarah Badel as Cleopatra.

== Musical adaptation ==
Caesar and Cleopatra was adapted for the 1968 Broadway musical Her First Roman by Ervin Drake; it was not a success.

== See also ==
- List of cultural depictions of Cleopatra

== Sources ==
- Croall, Jonathan (2000). Gielgud – A Theatrical Life, 1904–2000. London: Methuen. ISBN 0413745600.
- Dent, Alan (1952). Bernard Shaw and Mrs Patrick Campbell: Their Correspondence. London: Victor Gollancz. OCLC 1633840.
- Evans, Judith (2003). The Politics and Plays of Bernard Shaw. Jefferson: McFarland. ISBN 978-0-78-641323-2.
- Gaye, Freda, ed. (1967). Who's Who in the Theatre (fourteenth ed.). London: Sir Isaac Pitman and Sons. OCLC 5997224.
- Holroyd, Michael (1989). Bernard Shaw, Volume 2: 1898–1918: The Pursuit of Power. London: Chatto & Windus. ISBN 978-0-7011-3350-4.
- Holroyd, Michael (1993). Bernard Shaw, Volume 3: 1918–1950: The Lure of Fantasy. London: Penguin. ISBN 978-0-14-012443-9.
- Holroyd, Michael (1997). Bernard Shaw: The One-Volume Definitive Edition. London: Chatto & Windus. ISBN 978-0-7011-6279-5.
- Larson, Gale (May 1971). "Caesar and Cleopatra: The Making of a History Play". The Shaw Review. 14 (2): 73–89. JSTOR 40682557. (subscription required)
- Mencken, H. L. (1905). George Bernard Shaw: His Plays. Boston and London: J. W. Luce. OCLC 247244401.
- Nickson, Richard (1980). "Shaw on the Dictators: Labels and Libels". The Independent Shavian. 18 (1): 7–98. JSTOR 45303246. (subscription required)
- Peters, Margot (1985). Mrs Pat: The Life of Mrs Patrick Campbell. London: Hamish Hamilton. ISBN 0-24-111535-3.
- Roy, R. N. (1977). George Bernard Shaw's Historical Plays. Delhi: Macmillan. ISBN 0-333-21970-8.
- Wearing, J. P. (1981). The London Stage, 1900–1909: A Calendar of Plays and Players. Metuchen: Scarecrow Press. ISBN 0-81-081403-X.
- Wikander, Matthew (2004) [1998]. "Reinventing the History Play". In Christopher Innes (ed.). The Cambridge Companion to George Bernard Shaw. Cambridge: Cambridge University Press. ISBN 0-521-56237-6.
