= Cyrano (musical) =

- Original Cast Recording
- Music: Michael J. Lewis
- Lyrics: Anthony Burgess
- Book: Anthony Burgess
- Basis: Edmond Rostand's play Cyrano de Bergerac
- Productions: 1973 Broadway

Cyrano is a musical with a book and lyrics by Anthony Burgess and music by Michael J. Lewis.

Based on Edmond Rostand's classic 1897 play of the same name, it focuses on a love triangle involving the large-nosed poetic Cyrano de Bergerac, his beautiful cousin Roxana, and his classically handsome but inarticulate friend Christian de Neuvillette who, unaware of Cyrano's unrequited passion for Roxana, imposes upon him to provide the romantic words he can use to woo her successfully in mid-17th century Paris.

In the early 1960s, David Merrick had announced plans to produce a musical entitled Cyrano with a score by Leslie Bricusse and Anthony Newley, but nothing came of the project. Burgess had translated the Rostand play for the Guthrie in Minneapolis, and director Michael Langham suggested he adapt it for a musical version. Burgess joined forces with film composer Lewis, replacing dialogue in his play with musical numbers, and the completed work was staged at the Guthrie, again with Langham at the helm.

Following a 6 week tryout in Boston's Colonial Theatre and five previews, the Broadway production, directed and choreographed by Michael Kidd, opened on May 13, 1973 at the Palace Theatre, where it ran for 49 performances. The cast included Christopher Plummer as Cyrano, Leigh Beery as Roxana, and Mark Lamos as Christian, with Tovah Feldshuh making her Broadway debut in two small supporting roles.

Plummer won the Tony for Best Actor in a Musical and Drama Desk Award for Outstanding Performance, and Beery was Tony-nominated for Best Featured Actress in a Musical.

An original cast recording LP was released by A&M Records in 1973. An original cast recording CD was released by Decca Records in 2005.

In September 1994, an abridged version of the musical was staged at The Newport Arts Center in Orange County, California. Directed by Kent Johnson, and starring John Huntington as Cyrano and Deirdre McGill as Roxanne. One song, "You Have Made Me Love", released on a Broadway standards album sung by McGill.

== Song list ==
Act I

- Cyrano's Nose - Cyrano
- La France, La France - Company
- Tell Her - Le Bret and Cyrano
- From Now Till Forever - Cyrano & Company
- Bergerac - Cyrano & Roxana
- Pocapdedious - Cadets
- No, Thank You - Cyrano
- From Now Till Forever (Reprise) - Cyrano & Christian

Act II

- Roxana - Christian & Company
- It's She and It's Me - Christian
- You Have Made Me Love - Roxana
- Thither, Thother, Thide of Thee - Cyrano
- Pocapdedious (Reprise) - Le Bret & Cadets
- Paris Cuisine - Cyrano, Le Bret & Cadets
- Love Is Not Love - Roxana
- Autumn Carol - Roxana & Nuns
- I Never Loved You - Cyrano

== Original Broadway cast ==
- Cyrano de Bergerac - Christopher Plummer
- Roxana - Leigh Beery
- Christian de Neuvillette - Mark Lamos
- Le Bret, Captain of the Gascons - James Blendick
- Montfleury, A Romantic Tragedian - Patrick Hines
- Count de Guiche, Guardian of Roxana - Louis Turenne
- Ragueneau, A Baker and Poet - Arnold Soboloff
- Viscount de Valvert - J. Kenneth Campbell
- Roxana's Duenna, Sister Marthe - Anita Dangler
- Pickpocket, Capucine Monk - Geoff Garland
- Jodelet - Michael Goodwin
- The Marquis in Red - Alexander Orfaly
- Vendor - Tovah Feldshuh
- Child in the Bakery - Paul Thompson

== Awards and nominations ==
=== Original Broadway production ===
Year	Award ceremony	Category	Nominee	Result
1973	Drama Desk Award	Outstanding Actor in a Musical	Christopher Plummer	Won
1974	Tony Award	Best Performance by a Leading Actor in a Musical	Christopher Plummer	Won
1974	Tony Award	Best Performance by a Featured Actress in a Musical	Leigh Beery	Nominated
