= Captain Brassbound's Conversion =

1900 play by G. Bernard Shaw

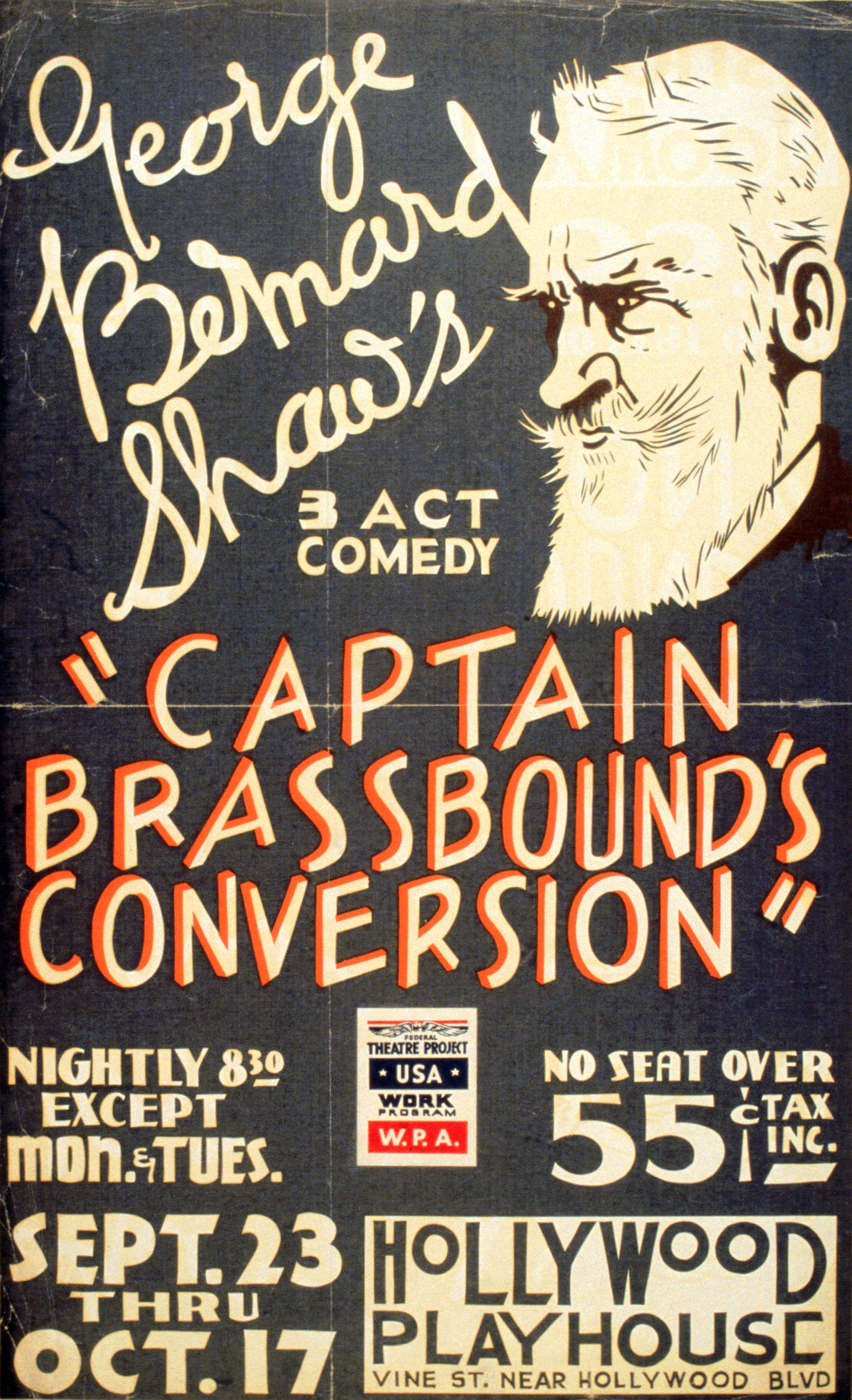
- Poster for the Federal Theatre Project production of Captain Brassbound's Conversion (1937)
- Written by: George Bernard Shaw
- Original language: English
- Subject: An aggrieved captain is persuaded to forego revenge
- Genre: melodrama/problem play
- Setting: Morocco

Premiere
- Date premiered: 16 December 1900 (Stage Society)
- Place premiered: Royal Strand Theatre

Captain Brassbound's Conversion (1900) is a play by G. Bernard Shaw. It was published in Shaw's 1901 collection Three Plays for Puritans (with Caesar and Cleopatra, and The Devil's Disciple). The first American production of the play starred Ellen Terry in 1907. The play explores the relationship between the law, justice, revenge and forgiveness.

== Characters ==
- Lady Cicely Waynflete
- Sir Howard Hallam
- Captain Brassbound
- Rankin
- Drinkwater
- Redbrook
- Johnson
- Marzo
- Sidi El Assif
- The Cadi
- Osman
- Hassan
- Captain Hamlin Kearney, U.S.N.
- American Bluejacket

== Plot ==
ACT I, Mogador, Morocco. Sir Howard Hallam, a judge, and his sister-in-law, Lady Cicely Waynflete, a well-known explorer, are at the home of Rankin, a Presbyterian minister. Rankin knows Sir Howard as the brother of an old friend, Miles Hallam, who moved to Brazil after marrying a local woman. Sir Howard tells Rankin that his widow's family illicitly seized his brother's property after his death, but Sir Howard has now recovered it. Lady Cicely decides to explore Morocco with Sir Howard. They are advised to take an armed escort. This can be organised by Captain Brassbound, a smuggler who owns a ship called Thanksgiving. When Brassbound arrives, he warns Sir Howard that justice is ruled by codes of honour, not law courts in the mountain country.

ACT II, A Moorish castle occupied by Brassbound. An Italian Brassbound crew member, Marzo, has been wounded in a feud. Lady Cicely is tending to him, initially to Brassbound's irritation, but she wins him over. Sir Howard complains that Brassbound behaves more like a jailer than a host; Brassbound says Sir Howard is his prisoner. Brassbound explains that he is the son of Sir Howard's deceased brother, Miles. He blames Sir Howard for the death of his mother and for tricking him out of his inheritance by legal technicalities. He intends to hand over Sir Howard to a fanatical Islamist Sheik. He tells Sir Howard that he presides over an unfair justice system that punishes the poor and weak. Now that Sir Howard is powerless, he will receive the justice for revenge. Lady Cicely intercedes and argues with Brassbound that his code of honour is at least as brutal as the legal system he condemns. Brassbound wavers and eventually agrees to give up revenge. When the Sheik arrives, he offers to buy back Sir Howard, but the Sheik will only accept one price – Lady Cicely. Cicely agrees, but the local ruler appears at this point, having learned of the transaction. He frees Sir Howard and arrests Brassbound.

ACT III, Rankin's house. Commander Kearney is to preside over a court of inquiry into Brassbound's actions. Sir Howard says he cannot interfere, but Lady Cicely persuades him to let her tell the court all that happened on the trip. She uses all her powers of persuasion to convince Commander Kearney that Brassbound is innocent of any crime. Kearney agrees to release Brassbound. The liberated Brassbound declares his devotion to Lady Cicely and wishes to marry her. Lady Cicely is powerfully drawn to Brassbound and fears she may succumb to his charisma. As she is about to agree, a gunshot is heard. It is the signal from Brassbound's crew that his ship is ready to depart. He leaves immediately, leaving Lady Cicely to say, "What an escape!"

== Preface and notes ==
Shaw explained that the topic of the play was the relationship between law and justice. He commented that "one of the evils of the pretence that our institutions represent abstract principles of justice, instead of being mere social scaffolding, is that persons of a certain temperament take the pretence seriously; and when the law is on the side of injustice, will not accept the situation, and are driven mad by their vain struggle against it."

Shaw added that his information about Morocco came from R.B. Cunninghame Graham's book, Mogreb-el-Acksa (the ancient Arab name of Morocco) (1898), "without which Captain Brassbound's Conversion would never have been written". The story of the legal dispute over the estate was derived from information provided about a similar case given to him by Frederick Jackson, of Hindhead.

== In performance ==
Captain Brassbound's Conversion at the Internet Broadway Database

The play was first performed at the Stage Society on 16 December 1900, at the Strand Theatre. A production in Manchester at the Queen's Theatre followed on 12 May 1902. The first London production was at the Royal Court, 20 March 1906, with Ellen Terry as Cicely Waynflete and Frederick Kerr as Brassbound.

In February 1971, a production opened at The Theatre Royal, Brighton. It transferred to The Cambridge Theatre, London, and ran till July. The cast was: Captain Brassbound: Joss Ackland. Drinkwater: Kenneth Williams. Lady Cicely Wayneflete: Ingrid Bergman.

- Crew:-

Costumes: Beatrice Dawson. Director: Frith Banbury.

== 1953 TV Production ==
The play was adapted for British TV in 1953.

=== Cast ===
- Margaret Lockwood as Lady Cicely Wayneflete
- John Gregson as Captain Brassbound
- John Laurie as Rankin
- Leslie Dwyer as Drinkwater
- John G. Heller as Hassan
- David Horne as Sir Howard Hallam
- Anthony Valentine as Page
- Noel Davis as Redbrook
- Martin Wyldeck as Johnson
- John Ruddock as Osman
- John Colicos as Sidi el Assif
- Edgar K. Bruce as Cadi
- Basil Appleby as Bluejacket
- James Dyrenforth as Captain Kearney USN
