= J.B. (play) =

1958 play by Archibald MacLeish

- Original language: English
- Written by: Archibald MacLeish
- Characters: Mr. Zuss; Nickles; J.B. Sarah; David; Jonathan; Mary; Ruth; Rebecca; First Messenger; Second Messenger; Girl; Jolly; Bildad; Zophar; Eliphaz; Mrs. Adams; Mrs. Murphy; Mrs. Lesure; Mrs. Botticelli; A Distant Voice; Sally Gibson
- Subject: A retelling of the Book of Job
- Genre: Drama
- Setting: A stage inside an enormous circus tent

Premiere
- Date: December 11, 1958
- Place: ANTA Playhouse; New York City

J.B. is a 1958 play written in free verse by American playwright and poet Archibald MacLeish, and is a modern-day retelling of the story of the biblical figure Job. The play is about J.B. (a stand-in for Job), a devout millionaire with a happy domestic life whose life is ruined. The play went through several incarnations before it was finally published. MacLeish began the work in 1953 as a one-act production, but within three years, had expanded it to a full, three-act manuscript.

The play has won several accolades, including the 1959 Tony Award for Best Play and the 1959 Pulitzer Prize for Drama.

Two versions of J.B. are available: the original book published by Houghton Mifflin Harcourt, and the script MacLeish revised substantially for Broadway, published by Samuel French Inc.

== Plot summary ==
The play opens in "a corner inside an enormous circus tent". Two vendors, Mr. Zuss (evoking the chief Greek god Zeus) and Nickles (i.e., "Old Nick," a folk name for the Devil) begin the play-within-a-play by assuming the roles of God and Satan, respectively. They overhear J.B., a wealthy New York banker, describe his prosperity as a just reward for his faithfulness to God.

Scorning him, Nickles wagers that J.B. will curse God if his life is ruined. Nickles and Zuss watch as J.B.'s children are killed, his property is ruined, and the former millionaire is left to the streets.

J.B. is then visited by three Comforters: Bildad, Eliphaz, and Zophar (representing history, science, and religion), who each offer a different explanation for his plight. J.B. declines to believe any of them, asking God himself to explain. Instead, he encounters Zuss and Nickles. Nickles urges him to commit suicide to spite God; Zuss offers him his old life back if he will promise to obey God.

J.B. rejects them both, and finds comfort in the person of his wife Sarah. The play ends with the two building a new life together.

== Productions ==
A first production was mounted by the Yale School of Drama at the Yale University Theater, New Haven, opening April 23, 1958. Brooks Atkinson wrote: "Being in an expansive mood, Archibald MacLeish has written an epic of mankind. He calls it "J.B." It was acted for the first time at the Yale University Theatre last evening." Directed by F. Curtis Canfield, the cast included James Shepherd as J.B.

The three-act version premiered on Broadway at the ANTA Playhouse on December 11, 1958, and closed on October 24, 1959, after 364 performances. Directed by Elia Kazan, the cast included Raymond Massey, Christopher Plummer, Nan Martin, Ivor Francis, Pat Hingle (J.B.), Clifton James, Judith Lowry, Candy Moore, James Olson, Ford Rainey, and Andreas Voutsinas. Brooks Atkinson wrote: "For 'J. B.', the title of Archibald MacLeish's new play at the ANTA Theatre, read 'Everyman'. Looking around at the wreckage and misery of the modern world, Mr. MacLeish has written a fresh and exalting morality that has great stature." The production was recorded and released by RCA Victor Red Seal.

An off-Broadway production by the Equity Library Theatre opened on March 17, 1962, at the Master Theatre, starring John Cazale.

The play was performed at the University of Nevada in Reno and Johns Hopkins University in Baltimore in 1963; in College Park, Maryland at the University of Maryland in 1965; at Hannibal-LaGrange College in Hannibal, Missouri in 1966; and Rensselaer Polytechnic Institute, Troy, New York, in 1971.

== Characters ==
- J.B. – a millionaire, based on the Old Testament character Job
- Sarah – J.B.'s wife
- Mr. Zuss – a retired-actor-now-balloon-vendor in a circus, assuming the role of the Abrahamic God
- Nickles – a retired-actor-now-popcorn-vendor in a circus, assuming the role of Satan
- The Distant Voice – an anonymous voice that prompts more action in the play, suggested to be the voice of God
- The children of J.B. and Sarah – David (13), Mary (12), Jonathan (10), Ruth (8), and Rebecca (6)
- Two "buxom, middle-aged" Maids
- Two Messengers: "dressed as soldiers' in scene three, with "battered felt hats...a news camera... a notebook" in scene four, "wearing steel helmets and brassards" in scene six
- A "stylishly dressed" Girl (scene four)
- In scene eight, et seq.: "Four Women" (Mrs. Adams, Mrs. Botticelli, Mrs. Lesure, and Mrs. Murphy) and "a young girl" (Jolly Adams), "their arms filled with blankets and newspapers"
- In scene nine: '"Three Comforters ... in worn-out clothing": Zophar, a fat, red-faced man wearing "the wreck of a clerical collar", Eliphaz, lean and dark, wearing "an intern's jacket which once was white", and Bildad, a squat, thick man in a ragged wind-breaker"

== Awards and nominations ==
The ANTA Playhouse production won the 1959 Tony Awards for Best Play and Best Direction.

The play won the 1959 Pulitzer Prize for Drama. The Pulitzer Prize committee wrote: " 'Certainly no other play of this or many seasons has attempted to come to grips with so large and universal a theme and succeeded in stating it in terms more eloquent, moving, provocative' than J.B."
