= Barrymore (play) =

Play by William Luce

- Written by: William Luce
- Characters: John Barrymore; Frank
- Original language: English
- Genre: Drama
- Setting: Broadway theatre

Premiere
- Date premiered: 1996
- Place premiered: Stratford Festival

Barrymore is a two-person play by William Luce which depicts John Barrymore a few months before his death in 1942 as he is rehearsing a revival of his 1920 Broadway triumph as Richard III.

Barrymore's attempted revival of his Richard III never actually took place and was a device that was invented for the play, but it served as a dramatic framework for the actor to reminisce about various episodes in his life and about his career downslide due to alcoholism.

Though classified as a one-person play, Barrymore actually makes frequent use of a second character, Frank the stage manager, who interacts with Barrymore over the theatre loudspeaker.

The play was originally produced at the Stratford Festival in 1996. The play was produced on Broadway at the Music Box Theatre, running from March 25, 1997, to November 2, 1997. Directed by Gene Saks, Christopher Plummer played Barrymore, and won the Tony Award for Best Performance by a Leading Actor in a Play. Plummer reprised his role in Érik Canuel's 2011 film adaptation of the same name.

Ben Brantley, in his review for The New York Times, wrote "Mr. Luce's script has a lurching quality that isn't just a matter of its subject's alcoholic disjunctiveness. And even for a work about a man whose life was a long-running performance, the play is overstuffed with one-liners...impersonations (of everyone from W. C. Fields to John's regal siblings, Ethel and Lionel, marvelously rendered) and the sort of stories that show up in books with titles like Amusing Theatrical Anecdotes. Yet Mr. Plummer and Mr. Saks have turned this fragmented material into something as fluid, stinging and warming as the cocktail (a Manhattan?) Barrymore mixes for himself onstage. And the evening (starting with the frayed lushness in autumnal colors of Santo Loquasto's backstage set) takes on an affecting shimmer of twilight, even as Mr. Plummer's Barrymore delights you with his own delight in his silly, ribald jokes."

== Other performances ==
- In 2014, Tatsuya Nakadai performed 'Barrymore' in a Japanese version directed by Ikumi Tanno.
- In 2019, the Uruguayan actor Jorge Bolani performed Barrymore in a Spanish version directed by Alfredo Goldstein.
- In 2026, Dimitris Kataleifos performed Barrymore in a Greek version directed by Phoivos Samartzis.
