= Our Fathers (film) =

2005 American television film

- Genre: Drama
- Based on: Our Fathers by David France
- Written by: Thomas Michael Donnelly
- Directed by: Dan Curtis
- Starring: Ted Danson; Christopher Plummer; Brian Dennehy; Daniel Baldwin; Ellen Burstyn
- Music by: Bob Cobert
- Country of origin: United States
- Original language: English

Production
- Executive producers: Gary Howsam; Charles Bloye; Dan Curtis; David Kennedy
- Producer: John J. McMahon
- Cinematography: Eric Van Haren Noman
- Editor: Henk Van Eeghen
- Running time: 130 minutes
- Production companies: Dan Curtis Productions; Peace Arch Entertainment

Original release
- Network: Showtime
- Release: May 21, 2005

Our Fathers is a 2005 American drama television film directed by Dan Curtis and starring Ted Danson, Christopher Plummer, Brian Dennehy and Ellen Burstyn. The screenplay was written by Thomas Michael Donnelly, based on the 2004 non-fiction book Our Fathers: The Secret Life of the Catholic Church in an Age of Scandal by David France. It was the last film directed by Curtis, who died soon after it was finished.

== Cast ==
- Ted Danson as Mitchell Garabedian
- Christopher Plummer as Cardinal Bernard Law
- Brian Dennehy as Father Dominic Spagnolia
- Daniel Baldwin as Angelo DeFranco
- Ellen Burstyn as Mary Ryan
- Kenneth Welsh as Bishop William Murphy
- Will Lyman as Wilson Rogers, Jr.
- Jan Rubeš as Pope John Paul II
- Aidan Devine as Bernie McDaid
- Steven Shaw as John J. Geoghan
- James Oliver as Patrick McSorley
- James Kall as Geoghan's Lawyer

== Awards and nominations ==
Year	Award	Category	Nominee(s)	Result	Ref.
2005	Online Film & Television Association Awards	Best Supporting Actor in a Motion Picture or Miniseries	Christopher Plummer	Nominated	
2005	Primetime Emmy Awards	Outstanding Supporting Actor in a Miniseries or a Movie	Brian Dennehy	Nominated	
2005	Primetime Emmy Awards	Outstanding Supporting Actor in a Miniseries or a Movie	Christopher Plummer	Nominated	
2005	Satellite Awards	Best Motion Picture Made for Television		Nominated	
2005	Satellite Awards	Best Actor in a Miniseries or Motion Picture Made for Television	Ted Danson	Nominated	
2005	Satellite Awards	Best Actor in a Supporting Role in a Series, Miniseries or Motion Picture Made for Television	Brian Dennehy	Nominated	
2006	Screen Actors Guild Awards	Outstanding Performance by a Male Actor in a Miniseries or Television Movie	Christopher Plummer	Nominated	
2006	Writers Guild of America Awards	Long Form – Adapted	Thomas Michael Donnelly	Nominated	

== See also ==
- Catholic sex abuse cases
