= Rating system =

A rating system can be any kind of rating applied to a certain application domain. They are often created using a rating scale.

Examples include:

- Motion picture content rating system
  - Motion Picture Association film rating system
  - Canadian motion picture rating system
- Television content rating system
- Video game content rating system
- DC Comics rating system
- Marvel Comics rating system
- Elo rating system
- Glicko rating system
- Chess rating system
- Rating system of the Royal Navy
- Star rating
- Sports rating system
- Wine rating
- Texas Education Agency accountability ratings system
- Global Rating System is a term used by
  - Fitch
  - Moodys
  - S&P Global
  - Eco Home
  - Global Sustainability Assessment System
  - International Sustainability Rating System
  - Forbes Travel Guide
  - Hotels Digest
  - COSMIN
  - OSCE
  - CISA
  - ITU GCI
  - IMF
  - Statista
  - Vertiv
