= Universal Rating System =

Chess rating system

The Universal Rating System (URS) is a system for rating chess players devised by Jeff Sonas, Mark Glickman, J. Isaac Miller and Maxime Rischard. It was introduced to determine seedings and qualifications for the 2017 Grand Chess Tour.

The main difference from FIDE's Elo rating system is the combination of all three time controls (classical, rapid and blitz) into a single rating list, whereas FIDE maintains three different rating lists.

== Development ==
The first rating list was published in January 2017, following two years of research.

Monthly rating lists from August 2016 onwards have been retroactively published. The number one player in every rating list so far has been Magnus Carlsen.

== See also ==
- Chess rating systems
- Chessmetrics
