= Creature Academy =

Comic book series

Publication information
- Publisher: Red 5 Comics (through ComiXology)
- Schedule: Irregular
- Format: Limited series
- Genre: Science fantasy
- Publication date: October 2013
- No. of issues: 4

Creative team
- Written by: Kevin Hanna; David Fagan
- Artist(s): Kevin Hanna; Erich Owen; Grant Bond; Karen Krajenbrink; Mirana Reveier; Brian Thies
- Editor(s): Daniel Solem; Olga Nunes

Collected editions
- Creature Academy: ISBN 978-0-615-92033-7

Creature Academy is an all-ages/science fiction/fantasy digital comic series created by Kevin Hanna, that ran for four issues and was published in a collected edition for the first time in 2013.

In 2008, LeftJet announced that they had taken steps for a possible future film adaptation; The film, The Creature Academy, is currently in preproduction.

== Plot ==
Creature Academy follows the story of Wes Mendes, a rebellious teen who has lived his life on the run with his mother. After his mother is kidnapped by ghost-like specters, Wes must hide in the under-city, a hidden city beneath Seattle where magic users and mythical creatures coexist. There, he joins a team of students and their mythical creatures at the Academy, a school for training magic users.

== Characters ==
The protagonist, Wes Mendes, is a young teen learning to navigate a world filled with adults and magic. The characters' names in the book are inspired by famous directors, such as Wes Anderson and Sam Mendes.

== Collected editions ==
The series has been collected into a hardcover volume Creature Academy in 2014 by Red 5 Comics.

== Controversy ==
In 2015, controversy arose when Kabam's mobile game, also named 'Creature Academy', was accused of infringing on Kevin Hanna's intellectual property. This led to the game being removed from app stores.
