= Temple of Art =

2018 American film by Allan Amato and Olga Nunes

- Written by: Allan Amato; Olga Nunes
- Produced by: Allan Amato; Olga Nunes; Jon Schnepp; Amanda Palmer; Neil Gaiman
- Music by: Jason Seigler
- Production company: Good Bully Collective
- Release date: 2018
- Country: United States
- Language: English

Temple of Art is a documentary film created and directed by Allan Amato and Olga Nunes. The film follows over 50 artists' creative process and philosophies, asking each of them the question, “Why do you make art?”.

The artists and musicians include: Grant Morrison, Bill Sienkiewicz, Brian Thies, Barron Storey, Amanda Palmer, Neil Gaiman, Olga Nunes, David Mack, Dave McKean and others, each sharing their stories of their creations, influences and philosophies.

The film provides a look at the industry of art as it continues to change and evolve.

Temple of Art has been slated for international distribution on DVD.
