= Allan Amato =

American photographer

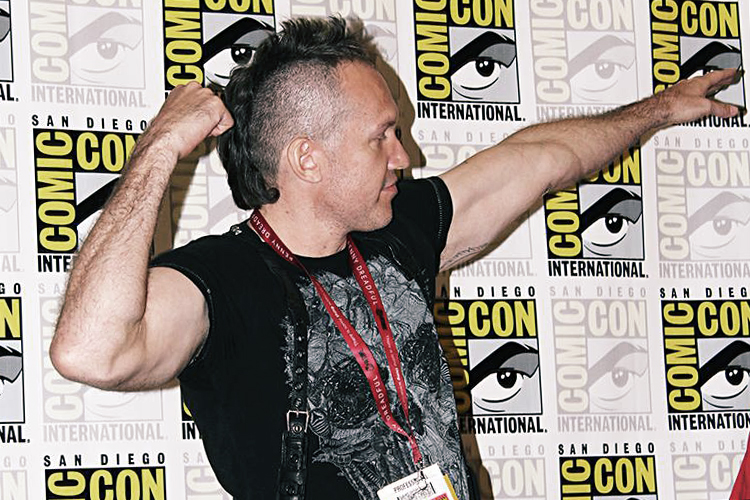
- Allan Amato at San Diego Comic-Con, 2015
- Born: July 18, 1974 (age 52); Harare, Zimbabwe
- Known for: Photography
- Awards: See article
- Website: allanamato.com

Allan Amato (born July 18, 1974) is an American portrait photographer, author, and film director.

== Early life and education ==
Amato was born in Harare, Zimbabwe and emigrated to the United States at age 13 due to political instability. He initially worked in advertising and bartending in New Orleans.

== Career ==
After Hurricane Katrina in 2005, Amato relocated to Houston, Texas, where he began pursuing photography professionally. He later moved to Los Angeles and began photographing artists, writers, and creatives, including Amanda Palmer, Kevin Smith, and Terry Gilliam.

In 2012, Amato began the Temple of Art project, originally conceived as a gallery show in Los Angeles, which expanded into a book and then a feature-length documentary, co-created with filmmaker Olga Nunes. The documentary profiles artists including Grant Morrison, Bill Sienkiewicz, Brian Thies, Barron Storey, Amanda Palmer, David Mack, Dave McKean, and others, discussing their creative process and philosophies. The film premiered in 2018.

Amato's book Slip: Naked in Your Own Words (Baby Tattoo Books, 2016) features sixty nude portraits and interviews, exploring themes of nudity and societal shame. In interviews and podcasts, Amato has emphasized fostering a safe, collaborative environment for subjects, encouraging vulnerability and authentic self-expression.

He has contributed as a producer and photographer to other documentary and multimedia projects, such as The Death of "Superman Lives": What Happened? (2015).

In addition to Temple of Art and Slip, Amato has published and contributed to other works, including Seraph and the Punch series, which explore identity and the human form.

== Style and philosophy ==
Amato's photography explores vulnerability, identity, and the human experience. His subjects are often portrayed in candid or nude states, paired with narratives that challenge cultural taboos around the body and personal history.

== Media appearances ==
Amato has discussed his life and work on podcasts such as Cutting For Sign.

== Selected works ==
=== Film credits ===
- Temple of Art (2018) – co-creator, co-director (with Olga Nunes)
- The Death of "Superman Lives": What Happened? (2015) – supervising producer

=== Book credits ===
- Slip: Naked In Your Own Words – photographer/author (Baby Tattoo Books, 2016)
- Temple of Art – photographer/author (Baby Tattoo Books, 2014)
- Seraph (Baby Tattoo Books, 2016)
- Punch, Vol. 1 and Punch, Vol. 2 (contributor)

== Recognition ==
- In 2016, Amato was nominated for the APN AltPorn Awards for Best Alternative Erotica Photographer of 2015.
