= Three points for a win =

Sports leagues standard

Three points for a win is a standard used in many sports leagues and group tournaments, especially in association football, in which 3 points are awarded to the team winning a match, with 0 points awarded to the losing team. If the game is drawn, each team receives 1 point. Many leagues and competitions originally awarded 2 points for a win and 1 point for a draw, before switching to the three points for a win system. The change is significant in league tables, where teams typically play 30–40 games per season. The system places additional value on wins compared to draws so that teams with a higher number of wins may rank higher in tables than teams with a lower number of wins but more draws.

== Rationale ==
"Three points for a win" is supposed to encourage more attacking play than "two points for a win", as teams will not settle for a draw if the prospect of gaining 2 extra points (by playing for a late winning goal) outweighs the prospect of losing 1 point by conceding a late goal to lose the match. A second rationale is that it may prevent collusion amongst teams needing only a draw to advance in a tournament or avoid relegation. A commentator has stated that it has resulted in more "positive, attacking play". However, critics suggest teams with a one-goal lead late in a match become more defensive in order to defend a lead. In addition, the overall competitive balance decreases in favour of top teams. The average number of goals per match in Turkey's top football division has risen significantly since the change to three points for a win.

The three-point system in ice hockey – in the Czech Republic, Finland, Germany, Russia, Switzerland and Sweden – had no effect on the number of goals scored. The same conclusion can be made for relative number of ties.

== Implications ==
Changing the scoring system may (or may not) change how a game is played, and it may change the results in a tournament even if there is no change in the way the game is played.

One key outcome is when an overall result is different under three points for a win (W3) compared to what it would have been under two points for a win (W2), for example in a four team round robin where the team who with 1W-1D-1L ranks higher than the team with three draws under W3, while the two teams are equal under W2. In the third round of games of a round robin with these potential outcomes, strategy will likely be different under W3 compared to if W2 was in place.

=== FIFA World Cup groups stage examples ===
For a four team round robin such as in the group stages of FIFA World Cups, with 3 points for a win (W3) there are 40 combinations e.g. 9-6-3-0 with each team being able to score from 0 up to 9 points (with 8 points being the only total that cannot be achieved), while in 2 points for a win (W2) there are 16 possible combinations of final standings points e.g. 6-4-2-0 with each team potentially able to score up to 6 points.

Five of the forty W3 combinations yield potentially different placings if the scoring system was W2. These are listed below, including the only three cases these combinations have occurred in FIFA World Cup group stages:

1. W3 6-5-4-1 would be W2 4-4-3-1. Looking at the top two teams, W3 1st (2 wins and 1 loss) ranks above W3 2nd (1 win and 2 draws). Under W2 these two teams are equal on 4 points and their rank is based on goal difference and other ranking criteria. In Group D of the 1998 FIFA World Cup Nigeria placed 1st with 6 points ahead of Paraguay with 5 points but Paraguay had the better goal difference, so the Group order of the two qualifying teams would have been reversed under W2. Both teams lost in their Round of 16 knockout games.
2. W3 4-4-4-3 would be W2 3-3-3-3. Under W3 the top three teams each had 1 win, 1 draw and 1 loss and ranked above W3 4th who had 3 draws (and therefore goal difference = 0). Under W2 all four teams have equal points and so would be ranked on goal difference and other ranking criteria.
3. W3 7-4-3-1 would be W2 5-3-3-1. Looking at the middle two teams, W3 2nd (1 win, 1 loss and 1 draw) rank above W3 3rd (3 draws and therefore had a goal difference = 0). Under W2 these two teams are equal on 3 points and their rank is based on goal difference and other ranking criteria. In Group D of the 2015 FIFA Women's World Cup (the group of death of that tournament) Australia finished second and Sweden third in the group. Both teams had 4 goals for and 4 goals against and in their final group match drew 1–1 against each other. Therefore under W2 they would have been equal under all the ranking criteria, so their group standing would have been judged on drawing lots. Sweden still qualified as a third place team under W3 but lost to Germany 1–4 in the Round of 16, whereas Australia played Brazil and won 1–0, then in the quarter finals lost 0–1 to Japan, the eventual runner-up.
4. W3 5-4-3-2 would be W2 4-3-3-2. Exactly as the W3 7-4-3-1 case above, looking at the middle two teams, W3 2nd (1 win, 1 loss & 1 draw) rank above W3 3rd (3 draws and therefore had a goal difference = 0). Under W2 these two teams are equal on 3 points and their rank is based on goal difference and other ranking criteria. In Group F of the 2010 FIFA World Cup Slovakia finished 2nd with a -1 goal difference (their win causing 5th-ranked Italy's early World Cup exit), while New Zealand finished 3rd with 0 goal difference having played three draws. Therefore New Zealand would have advanced to the Round of 16 under W2 and so would have had their most successful World Cup (they have never advanced from the group stage). Instead, under W3, Slovakia advanced, losing to Netherlands 1–2 in the Round of 16.
5. W3 7-4-3-2 would be W2 5-3-2-2. Looking at the two bottom ranked teams, W3 3rd (1 win and 2 losses) ranks above W3 4th (2 draws and 1 loss). Under W2 these two teams are equal on 2 points and their rank would be based on goal difference and other ranking criteria.

== History ==
The system was proposed for the English Football League (then known as The Football League) by Jimmy Hill. It was introduced in England in 1981, but did not attract much use elsewhere until it was used in the 1994 World Cup finals. In 1995, FIFA formally adopted the system, and it subsequently became standard in international tournaments, as well as most national football leagues. In the mid to late 1990s, leagues and governing bodies in the sports of ice hockey, field hockey, volleyball, water polo, bandy, floorball, camogie, and Gaelic football would start adopting the three points for a win system. Variations on the original 3 points for a win, 1 point for a tie, 0 points for a loss were invented. For example, in ice hockey where overtime/shootouts are used determine the winner for every game, at the end of regulation teams earn 3 points for a win, 1 point for a tie, and 0 points for a loss, with the winner of overtime/shootouts earning 1 additional point for a total of 2 earned in the game. This means once a winner is decided, the point system is 3 points for a regulation win, 2 points for an overtime/shootout win, 1 point for an overtime/shootout loss, and 0 points for a regulation loss.

=== Association football ===
This lists association football leagues where the standard is 3 points for a win in regulation time, 1 point for a draw, 0 for a defeat. The year given is when the relevant season started.

- 1981: England
- 1982: Israel
- 1983: New Zealand (NSL)
- 1984: Iceland
- 1986: Northern Ireland
- 1987: Turkey, Hong Kong
- 1988: Norway, Japan
- 1990: Sweden, Georgia
- 1991: Cyprus, Finland
- 1992: Australia, Greece
- 1993: Belgium (Div. 2), Bulgaria, Ireland, Italy (Serie C1 and Serie C2)
- 1994: Croatia, Czech Republic, Estonia, France (after a trial in 1988–89), Hungary, Italy (Serie A and Serie B), Iran, Iraq (after a trial in 1984–85), Kazakhstan, Malta, Moldova, Romania, Scotland, Slovakia, South Korea, Ukraine, AFC (1994–95 Asian Club Championship), FIFA (1994 FIFA World Cup) and UEFA (UEFA Euro 1996 qualifying)
- 1995: Argentina, Armenia, Austria, Azerbaijan, Belarus, Belgium (Div. 1), Brazil, Chile, China, Colombia, Denmark, Faroe Islands, Germany, Italy (Lega Nazionale Dilettanti), Latvia, Lithuania, Luxembourg, Mexico, Netherlands, Peru, Poland, Portugal, Russia, Slovenia, Spain, Switzerland, Uruguay, CONMEBOL (Copa América), CONMEBOL (Copa Libertadores) and UEFA (UEFA Champions League)
- 1996: AFC (1996 AFC Asian Cup qualification), CAF (African Cup of Nations), UEFA (UEFA Euro 1996) and AFC (1996 AFC Asian Cup)

Major League Soccer, based in the United States and Canada, has awarded three points for a win since its first season of 1996, but initially held a penalty shootout at the end of regulation draws, awarding 1 point to the winner of the shootout and 0 to the loser. Since 2000, it has allowed ties or draws to stand in the regular season, and follows the international standard of awarding 1 point for a draw.. Since 2023 The Leagues Cup between MLS and Liga MX uses 3 points for a regulation win, 2 points for a shootout win, 1 point for a shootout loss, 0 for a regulation loss point system in the group stage.

=== Ice hockey ===
Many ice hockey leagues use the 3 points for a regulation win, 2 points for an overtime/shootout win, 1 point for an overtime/shootout loss, 0 points for a regulation loss as a way to incentivize teams to win in regulation thus causing more attacking play. Listed below are the years that ice hockey leagues and associations have adopted and abandoned a 3 points for a win system.

- 1998: Germany (3 points for a regulation win, 2 points for an overtime/shootout win, 1 point for an overtime/shootout loss, 0 points for a regulation loss)
- 1999: Sweden (3 points for a regulation win, 2 points for an overtime/shootout win, 1 point for an overtime/shootout loss, 0 points for a regulation loss), Russia men's (3 points for a regulation win, 2 points for an overtime win, 1 point for a tie or overtime loss, 0 points for a regulation loss)
- 2000: Czechia, Slovakia (3 points for a regulation win, 2 points for an overtime win, 1 point for a tie or overtime loss, 0 points for a regulation loss), Russia women's (3 points for a win, 1 point for a tie, 0 points for loss)
- 2001: Slovakia (abandonment),Russia women's (3 points for a regulation win, 2 points for an overtime win, 1 point for a tie or overtime loss, 0 points for a regulation loss)
- 2002: Slovakia (3 points for a regulation win, 2 points for an overtime win, 1 point for a tie, 0 points for any loss)
- 2003 Japan/South Korea,
- 2004: Slovakia (3 points for a regulation win, 2 points for an overtime win, 1 point for a tie or overtime loss, 0 points for a regulation loss), Finland (3 points for a regulation win, 2 points for an overtime/shootout win, 1 point for an overtime/shootout loss, 0 points for a regulation loss)
- 2006: Switzerland, Czechia (3 points for a regulation win, 2 points for an overtime/shootout win, 1 point for an overtime/shootout loss, 0 points for a regulation loss), Slovakia (3 points for a regulation win, 2 overtime/shootout win, 0 points for any loss)
- 2007: IIHF, Russia,Austria (3 points for a regulation win, 2 points for an overtime/shootout win, 1 point for an overtime/shootout loss, 0 points for a regulation loss)
- 2008: Slovakia (3 points for a regulation win, 2 points for an overtime/shootout win, 1 point for an overtime/shootout loss, 0 points for a regulation loss)
- 2009: CCHA (USA men's collegiate) (3 points for a regulation/overtime win, 2 points for a shootout win, 1 point for shootout loss, 0 points for a regulation/overtime loss)
- 2015: France (3 points for a regulation win, 2 points for an overtime/shootout win, 1 point for an overtime/shootout loss, 0 points for a regulation loss)
- 2018: KHL (Russia men's) (abandonment).
- 2020: Hockey Commissioners Association-affiliated conferences (most NCAA, US collegiate)
- 2023: PWHL (North American women's) (3 points for a regulation win, 2 points for an overtime/shootout win, 1 point for an overtime/shootout loss, 0 points for a regulation loss)
1. in the 2007/2008 season both the Russian men's and women's top division adopted the point system listed
2. NHL(USA/Canada), KHL (Russia), and EIHL (UK) use the 2 points for any win, 1 point for an overtime/shootout loss, 0 points for a regulation loss in hockey point system. Instead of using a three-point system, they incentivize winning in regulation through tiebreakers. The NHL, KHL, and EIHL currently all use greater number of regulation wins as the first tiebreaker once all regular season games are played. This makes a regulation win more valuable than an overtime or shootout win but only in the case of a tie with another team in the standings.

=== Bandy ===
The Russian Bandy Super League started using 3 points for a win, 1 point for a tie, 0 for a loss point system for the preliminary round in 1995. In 1996 the 3 points for a win, 1 point for a tie, 0 for a loss point system was adopted for all rounds.

=== Field hockey ===
Since 1998 FIH has used the 3 points for a win, 1 point for a tie, 0 for a loss point system.

=== Water polo ===
The FINA Water Polo World League used the 3 points for a regulation win, 1 point for a tie, 0 points for a regulation loss point system in 2003 and 3 points for a regulation win, 2 points for a shootout win, 1 point for shootout loss, 0 points for a regulation loss point system from 2004 to 2022. In 2023 FINA Water Polo World League was ended and both the men's and women's World cup adopted the 3 points for a regulation win, 2 points for a shootout win, 1 point for shootout loss, 0 points for a regulation loss point system. The 2024 Olympics tournament used the same system.

=== Camogie ===
The All-Ireland Senior Camogie Championship adopted 3 points for a win, 1 point for a tie, 0 for a loss point system in 2016.

=== Ladies' Gaelic football ===
Since 2020 The Ladies' Gaelic Football Association currently uses the 3 points for a win, 1 point for a tie, 0 for a loss point system for all competitions.

=== Volleyball ===
In FIVB Summer Olympics & World Championship adopted the match point system of 3 points for winning in three or four sets, 2 points for winning in five sets, 1 point for losing in five sets, 0 points for losing in three or four sets in 2011. Since 2016 matches won has been the primary ranking method with the match point system being first tiebreaker.

=== Floorball ===
- 1999 Sweden (3 points for a regulation win, 2 points for an overtime win, 1 point for an overtime loss, 0 points for a regulation loss)
- 2018: Finland (3 points for a regulation win, 2 points for an overtime win, 1 point for an overtime loss, 0 points for a regulation loss)

== Variants ==
Some leagues have used shootout tiebreakers after drawn matches. Major League Soccer (1996–2000) used 3 points for a win, 1 point for a shootout win, 0 points for a loss in any fashion (including shootouts). The Norwegian First Division (in 1987) and the Campeonato Brasileiro Série A and its lower divisions (in 1988) used 3 points for a win, 2 points for a shootout win, 1 point for a shootout loss, none for a loss. The same system is adopted in the group stages of the 2016–17 EFL Trophy and 2016–17 Scottish League Cup onward (in both cases, no extra time will be played). The Iraqi Premier League has used two different variants of this system. The first was in the 1988–89 season, where 3 points were awarded for a win by two or more goals (after normal or extra time), 2 points were awarded for a one-goal win (after normal or extra time), 1 point was awarded for a penalty shootout win and 0 points were awarded for penalty shootout defeats or defeats after normal or extra time. The second variant was used in the 1994–95 season, where 3 points were awarded for a one-goal or two-goal win, but 4 points were awarded for a win by three or more goals.

In the National Hockey League in North America, a system described as "the three point win" was proposed in 2004, with 3 points for a win in regulation time, 2 for a win in overtime, and 1 for a tie. This proposal was put on hold by the 2004–05 NHL lock-out and subsequently rejected by team owners in February 2007. Instead the NHL awards 2 points for a win in regulation or overtime/shootout, 1 point for an overtime or shootout loss, and 0 for a regulation loss.

International competitions run by the International Ice Hockey Federation award 3 points for a win in regulation time and 0 points for a loss. Games in IIHF competitions are not allowed to end in ties; if a game is tied after regulation each team is awarded 1 point and a sudden-death overtime followed by a shootout (if necessary) is played, with the winner awarded an extra point (for a total of 2 points).

In 2009, the Central Collegiate Hockey Association adopted a system of 3 points for a regulation or overtime win, 2 for a shootout win, 1 for a shootout loss, and 0 for a regulation or overtime loss. The IIHF uses a similar system for its competitions, awarding three points for a win in regulation, 2 points for a win in overtime or shootout, 1 point for a loss in overtime or shootout, and 0 points for a loss in regulation.

== See also ==
- Group tournament ranking system
- Winning percentage
- Overtime (sports)
- Penalty shoot-out (association football)
- Ranking
- Ranking (statistics)
- Rating system
