= Olga Nunes =

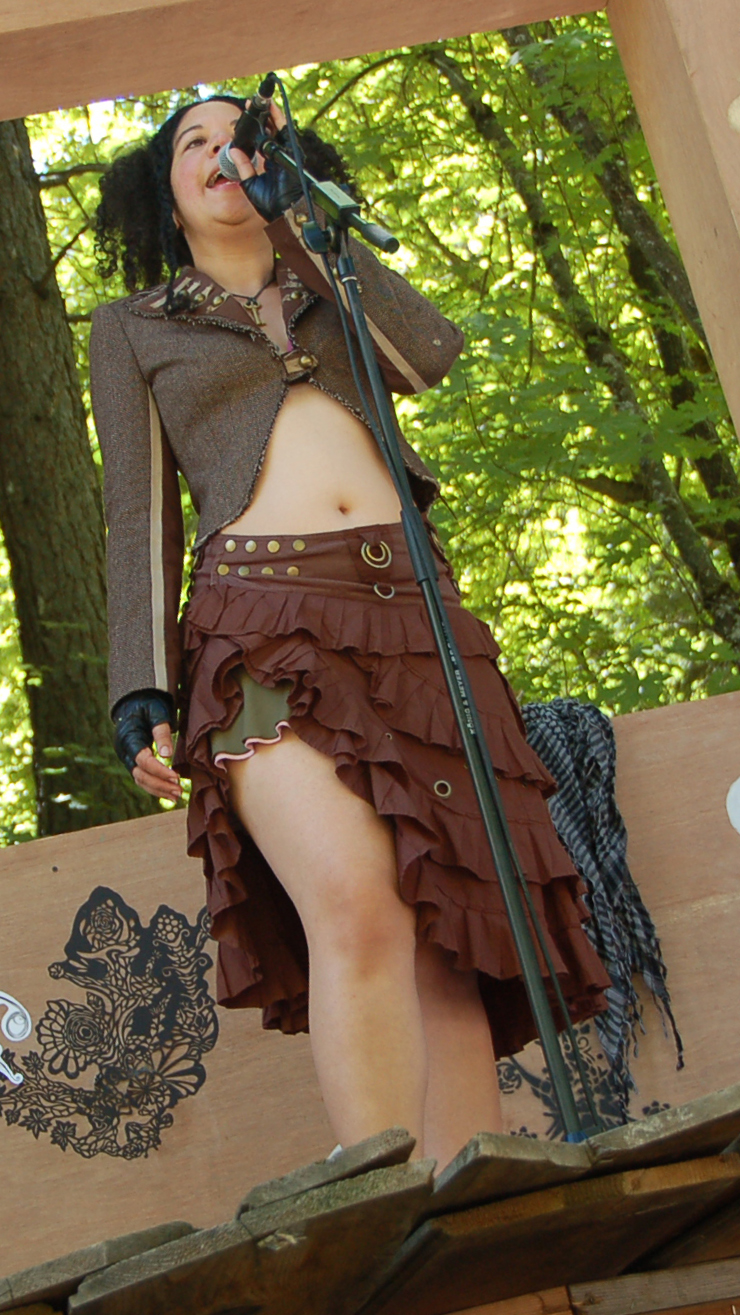

Background information
- Born: Olga Nunes; January 1, 1979 (age 47); Montreal, Canada
- Genres: Piano rock, alternative rock, art pop, art rock, baroque pop
- Occupations: Composer, producer
- Instrument: Piano
- Website: www.olganunes.com

Olga Nunes (born January 1, 1979) is a Canadian-born performer, pianist, singer and composer based in San Francisco, California.

== Music career ==
Olga began writing songs in 2005, after being taught the basics of piano by a Buddhist monk, and began playing with her band in Los Angeles soon after.

Her first video of her single "A Dream Of Gardens" was released in 2007, with lyrics by Neil Gaiman. Gaiman also credits Nunes in his crowd-sourcing success.

Nunes also collaborated with Amanda Palmer, designing and curating the “'Who Killed Amanda Palmer “alternate reality game.

In 2009, Olga recorded the xkcd song "Boomdeyada", which she later directed and co-produced as a video with Neil Gaiman, Wil Wheaton, and Cory Doctorow.

In 2010 Olga launched a project for the forthcoming album LAMP, a series of songs with a fictional story woven around them, told in videos and art installations.

Olga Nunes, then developed a feature-length a documentary; Temple of Art (with Allan Amato). The documentary profiles Grant Morrison, Bill Sienkiewicz, Brian Thies, Barron Storey, Amanda Palmer, Neil Gaiman, David W. Mack, Dave McKean and others, each sharing their stories of their creations, influences and philosophies.

== Personal life ==
Olga was born in Montreal, Canada, to Spanish and Brazilian parents. Raised in Florida as a teenager, her first experience with music took the form of musical theatre.

Olga is currently living in San Francisco.

== Discography ==
=== Solo ===
- Lamp (2013)
- Maps For The Open Road (2009) with Lyrics by Neil Gaiman
- Last Call (2007)

=== Soundtracks ===
- 2014 - The Fallow (film) - composer, additional music

== Film ==
- Temple of Art (2020) co-creator (with Allan Amato)

Nunes has also released more than a dozen singles and 20 B-sides, and has contributed original material to independent film soundtracks.
