= Cellista =

American cellist and artistic director

- Born: Freya Seeburger; February 21, 1983 (age 43); Colorado, United States
- Origin: San Jose, California, United States
- Genres: classical; pop; hip-hop; experimental
- Occupations: Cellist; composer; artistic director
- Instrument: Cello
- Years active: 2000s–present

Cellista (born Freya Seeburger, February 21, 1983, in Colorado) is an American cellist and artistic director. She is known for collaborating with artists across various media, as well as live performances in unconventional spaces that incorporate elements of classical music, theater, improvisation and visual art across a range of genres including pop, hip-hop, classical and more. These performances often feature a carbon fiber cello and loop station.

== Stage Poems ==
Cellista's stage poems are multimedia installations that weave together various discipline into a presentation which encapsulates a story.

=== The End of Time ===
Her interdisciplinary exhibit The End of Time alongside internationally renowned visual artist Barron Storey's solo exhibit Quartet at Anno Domini art gallery in downtown San Jose, California with her chamber music collective the Juxtapositions Chamber Ensemble received critical acclaim. The dual exhibition, created in tribute to French composer Olivier Messiaen’s seminal chamber work The Quartet for the End of Time, received mention in Juxtapoz magazine.

Of the quartet, Cellista has said "The narrative of the quartet seemed to have immediacy to the San Jose of now. I think in many ways it makes apparent San Jose's connection to the past and illuminates a way to the future."

=== Finding San Jose ===
Full-length album and stage poem. Recorded between 2015 and 2016, after a successful Kickstarter campaign, the album utilized the receipt tags as creative prompts from ‘Bird in a Cage.’ Finding San Jose became the soundtrack for an hour long presentation that contained a reminiscent story about a love affair with a city. The story was conveyed through the creation of a full-length film that played as the live stage poem, with ballet and live music. The film and stage poem, are both able to function independently. The album was featured on KQED and San Jose's Metroactive.

=== Transfigurations ===
Transfigurations is a multidisciplinary performance art piece and album created by Cellista. Both the album and the installation are accompanied by a full-length book written by Cellista and her father, the philosopher Frank Seeburger, known for his work on Heidegger, and addiction.

Transfigurations is a response to the Trump presidency and the repetitions of history, which reinforce the unequal structures that gave rise to this moment in time. Transfigurations as a performance piece incorporates original sound design, live cello improvisations, new compositions by Bay Area composers, chamber music, and modern dance.

After its first live performance, the piece was turned into a 20-minute film that debuted on at the Diamond in the Rough Film Festival. The debut performance was also featured on KQED for its 100 Days of Art series.

== TV and Film ==
- Cellista a short film by Brian Favorite. Role: Composer and Actor
- Sickness In The System by Brian Gibel, Distributed by Field of Vision. Role: Composer
- The Real Murders of Orange County on Oxygen, Season 2 Episodes: 201, 202, 203, 204, 206, 208, 210. Role: Composer

== Acting ==
- Will & Grace special event series "Back This Fall" Trailer. Role: Extra

== Session work ==
A noted session musician for both recording and live performance, Cellista has worked with:

- Grammy-nominated artist Tanya Donelly
- Producer John Vanderslice
- Don McLean
- Casey Crescenzo
- Van Dyke Parks.
- Yassou
- Lady Lazarus
- The Canales Project with Carla Canales and Kurt Crowley, musical director of Broadway's Hamilton
- Christine Ebersole

== Awesome Orchestra ==
Cellista is an Ambassador for the Awesome Orchestra, a classical music collective with an eye towards increasing the accessibility of orchestral music.

== Discography ==
Cellista's debut full-length album Finding San Jose engineered by Maryam Qudus (Doe Eye) was released in Fall 2016. Of the album, she remarked "Most especially, this is an offering to the artists of San Jose. I owe San Jose my creative life. I see the town going through a period of rapid growth and development, and I would like to offer this album to my community in dedication of a time when San Jose used to be orchards." The album was re-mixed by a number of Bay area artists including Pam the Funkstress the legendary turntablist and DJ for music icon Prince (musician).

== Awards and honors ==
Cellista is a 2014 Belle Foundation grantee. She is also a Nagel's Scholarship recipient. For her work with Messiaen's "Quatuor Pour La Fin Du Temps", she received the Otey Award for research writing from San Francisco State University. She has also sat on several panels, including the ImagineSJ music panel. She was a San Jose Art Commissioner between 2015 and 2016.
