= Stephen Byrne (comics) =

Irish artist and animator

- Born: Stephen Andrew Byrne; 7 March 1986 (age 40); Dublin, Ireland
- Occupations: Comics artist, animator

Stephen Andrew Byrne (born 7 March 1986, Dublin, Ireland) is an Irish artist and animator noted for his work in animation, comic books, video games, and television. He is best known for his work on the Serenity comic with Joss Whedon and Chris Roberson, DC's Green Arrow, and his online animated shorts.

In 2016, Byrne was announced as the new artist for DC's The Ray.

== Biography ==
Byrne was born in Dublin. By age 12, he knew he was going to be an artist.

Byrne currently lives in Seattle, Washington working on Plants vs. Zombies Heroes.

His next project was Wonder Twins from DC Comics in February 2019.

== Comic book credits ==
- Steve Loves Internet – creator/writer/artist (webcomic, 2005)
- Trick 'r Treat: Days of the Dead – artist (Legendary comics, 2015)
- DOCTOR WHO: THE NINTH DOCTOR #2: – cover artist Titan Comics, 2016)
- Dark Horse Announces 2016 Free Comic Book Day Gold Comic #6: "Serenity" (with Joss Whedon, and Chris Roberson, Dark Horse Comics, 2016)
- Green Arrow #6, 7, 9 (with Benjamin Percy, DC Comics, 2016)

== Video game credits ==
- 2014 Peggle 2, UI (PopCap Games, Electronic Arts)
- 2015 Peggle Blast, Art Lead (PopCap Games, Electronic Arts)
- 2016 Plants vs. Zombies Heroes, art director (PopCap Games, Electronic Arts) (with Kevin Hanna, Jordan Kotzebue and Chris Furnis)
