= Grant Bond =

American comic book artist and writer

- Born: July 6, 1974 (age 52) Kansas City, Kansas, U.S.
- Areas: Artist, writer
- Notable works: Revere: Revolution in Silver

Grant Bond is an American comic book artist, writer and award-winning editorial cartoonist living in Kansas City, Kansas.

== Biography ==
Grant Bond was born and raised in Kansas City, Kansas. His love for art was a fixture of his youth and early adult life due to the support and influence of his grandmother. He studied under Russian painter Sergei Davydov for many years. Bond has credited comic creator Ande Parks for personally sparking an early interest in creating comics. He left the creative world behind to successfully manage a business for most of the 1990s. In late 2006 he returned to comics with his first book Revere: Revolution in Silver originally published with Alias Enterprises. As a relative newcomer to comics, Bond's animation-influenced art style has already amassed a heavy fan base.

In 2006 Bond illustrated The Clockwork Girl comic book now being adapted into the 2014 animated feature film The Clockwork Girl (film). In 2007 he illustrated a comic book adaptation of the 2009 movie Trick 'r Treat, which was published by DC/Wildstorm.

== Partial bibliography ==
- Creature Academy (Frogchildren Studios, 2013)
- Tron: Uprising (Disney)
- Supernatural (U.S. TV series): Caledonia (DC Comics, 2011)
- Assassin's Creed: Ascendance (Ubisoft, 2010)
- Megamind (DC/Wildstorm, 2010)
- American McGee's Grimm Adaptation (IDW Publishing, 2009)
- Igor (film) Movie Prequel (IDW Publishing, 2008)
- Archibald Saves Christmas (Shadowline, 2007)
- Trick 'r Treat (DC/Wildstorm, 2007)
- Revere: Revolution in Silver Hardcover (ASP Comics, 2007)(ISBN 1-932386-59-9 ; Released 7/28/07)
- Gene Simmons House of Horrors Anthology (IDW Publishing, 2007)
- Clockwork Girl (Arcana Studio, 2007) (HarperCollins, 2011)
- Revere: Revolution in Silver (Alias Enterprises, 2006)

== Film ==
- Grant Bond was an uncredited extra in the 1989 movie No Holds Barred starring professional wrestler Hulk Hogan.
