= The Clockwork Girl =

Sci-fi/fantasy comic series

Publication information
- Publisher: Arcana Studios
- Schedule: Irregular
- Format: Limited series
- Genre: see below
- Publication date: August 2007 – August 2008

Creative team
- Written by: Sean O'Reilly; Kevin Hanna
- Artists: Mike Thomas; Grant Bond; Karen Krajenbrink; Mirana Reveier; Brandon Graham; Kevin Hanna

Collected editions
- The Clockwork Girl: ISBN 978-0-9809204-1-3

The Clockwork Girl is an all-ages/science fiction/fantasy comic series created by Sean O'Reilly and Kevin Hanna and inspired by Hanna's earlier zine "Clockwork Girls hate Electronic Boys", that ran for five issues and was published in a collected edition for the first time in 2008.

The Clockwork Girl tells the tale of a nameless robot girl who has recently been given the gift of life from her creator. While she explores the wonders of an ordinary world she meets an amazing mutant boy and they share a friendship that must overcome their warring families.

In 2008, Telefilm Canada announced that they had funded the property for a possible future film adaptation. The film, The Clockwork Girl, has been released.

== Characters ==
=== Main characters ===
- Tesla, the Clockwork Girl: (protagonist) is a young robot girl learning how to live in a world of adults. She looks at strangers like a kid in a candy store and wants to know everything about this new world around her. The character's name was inspired by inventor Nikola Tesla, and Kevin Hanna's earlier zine "Clockwork Girls hate Electronic Boys".
- Huxley, the Monster Boy: the unruly creation of Doctor Dendrus, is brash and adventurous. This often gets him into predicaments that only his foolhardy adolescent fearlessness can get him out of. In his own mind he has always been cool and in control, which is to say until Tesla the Clockwork Girl turned his life upside-down. The character was named after author Aldous Huxley, and not "Darwin's bulldog" Thomas Huxley as many have assumed.
- Maddox: Huxley's best friend, who got almost killed by T-Bolt ((Scroll down for info)) and caused Wilhelm and Dendrus to trust each other.
- Wilhelm The Tinkerer: a wild eyed eccentric egomaniac and the world's most brilliant machine scientist. He blames the natural sciences for holding back the machine age with a zealous fervor and believes the Clockwork Girl is his key to Dendrus's undoing. He views the Clockwork Girl as his greatest accomplishment. It's not until she is threatened that he realizes that she is so much more.
- Doctor Dendrus: an offbeat father trying to keep up with his unconventional and untamed son, Huxley. He cares for his son a great deal but is overly protective and shelters him as much as he can. Dendrus is the Tinkerer's former friend, his chief rival and the world's greatest biologist.

=== Supporting characters ===
- T-Bolt: The Tinkerer's first machine man and biggest failure. Named after Tybalt of Romeo and Juliet.
- The Marmokeets: Vicious mutations that infest the city like rats. They are pygmy marmoset/parakeet hybrids.

=== Locations ===
All of the events of the books take place (for the most part), in the city of Harfang. Each Scientist's castle are at opposite ends of the city.

- The Mechanized Castle: The Tinkerer's mechanized fortress
- The Living Castle: Dendrus' living castle
- The Great Cypress: A giant tree that Huxley shows Tesla on their first day out together, which she later hides in for shelter.

== Collected editions ==
The series has been collected into a hardcover volume:

- The Clockwork Girl (Arcana Comics, 2008)
- The Clockwork Girl – (HarperCollins, 2011)

== Awards ==
- The Moonbeam Award
- Silver in the Graphic Novels & Comics category for the 2008 Book of the Year Awards, announced at BookExpo America by ForeWord magazine.

== Film adaptation ==
The film The Clockwork Girl was released in early 2014.
