= Deutsche Wertungszahl =

German chess rating system

The Deutsche Wertungszahl (abbreviation: DWZ, ger. German Rating Number) is a chess rating system used in Germany. A higher rating number corresponds to a stronger player. A beginner is rated around 500 and a world champion about 2800.

== Preface ==
The DWZ was introduced by the DSB (Deutscher Schachbund, ger. German Chess Association) after the German reunification in 1990. On January 1, 1993, the DWZ was introduced nationwide and replaced the Ingo-System of the DSB in the Federal Republic of Germany and the NWZ-System of the German Chess Association in East Germany. The DWZ is similar to the Elo rating system of the FIDE, but was enhanced further over the years. In development, the experiences of the Ingo-System and the NWZ-System were respected. The scale goes from about 500 (beginners) to over 2800 (world champions), but is, in theory, open at the top and bottom. The evaluation of the tournaments is done by DWZ-abstractors who transfer the tournament results to the headquarters of the DOSB (Deutscher Olympischer Sportbund, ger. German Olympic Sports Confederation), where the ZDB (Zentrale Wertungsdatenbank, ger. Central Rating Database) is administrated. There, a chronological subsequent billing is accomplished according to the finish date of the tournament.

In contrast to the Ingo-System, a higher DWZ represents a better playing ability. The DWZ consists of an evaluation number as a measurement of the playing ability and an index number which is separated from that by a "-" sign. For players who do not have a DWZ, but have a FIDE-Elo, the FIDE-Elo is used, marked with the index 6 and resumed as DWZ. For players who neither have a DWZ nor a FIDE-Elo, but have a national evaluation number, this number is used and translated if necessary. In this case the index is set to zero.

== Calculating the DWZ ==
The basic curve for calculation is the Gauss error distribution curve. For calculation, an integral is necessary to determine the expectation of winnings. Only chess results against competitors with a DWZ are taken into account.

=== Basic formula ===
The DWZ is calculated in the following way:

$$Z_n = Z_0 + \frac{800}{E+n} (W - W_e)$$

$Z_0$: present DWZ
$Z_n$: new DWZ
$W$: achieved points
$W_e$: expected points
$n$: number of finished games
$E$: development coefficient

==== Expected and achieved points ====
The achieved points $W$ are the sum of the game results in which a win counts 1 point, a draw counts ½ point, and a defeat 0 points. The expected points $W_e$ are calculated with the following approximation:

$$W_e = \frac{1}{1+ 10^{(Z_G-Z_A)/400}}$$

$Z_A$: present DWZ
$Z_G$: present DWZ of the competitor

The expected points are calculated for each game of chess and then added. The exact values of the expected points can be looked at in the table of the DSB. The formula provides good approximations.

==== The development coefficient ====
Another constituent is the development coefficient $E$. It consists of the fundamental value $E_0$, the acceleration factor $a$ and the braking value $B$:

$$E = a \cdot E_0 + B$$

with

$$E_0 = \left(\frac{Z_A}{1000}\right)^4 + J$$

where the component $J$ depends on the age of the player:

$$J = \begin{cases}
5, & \text{for teenagers (up to 20 years)}\\
10,& \text{for junior adults (21 - 25 years)}\\
15,& \text{for adults (over 25 years)}
\end{cases}$$

and

$$a= \frac{Z_A}{2000}$$

The factor $a$ is furthermore defined as $1 \geq a \geq 0.5$. Additionally, it is only calculated if the player is less than 20 years old and has achieved more points than expected. The acceleration factor a is 1 if that is not the case. The acceleration factor helps young players to improve their DWZs more quickly.

$$B = e^\frac{1300 - Z_A}{150} - 1$$

The braking value B is only calculated for players with a DWZ of under 1300 points and only if the achieved points are less or equal to the expected ones, else the braking value is 0. The braking value makes the DWZ of poor players decrease not so rapidly.

Besides, $E$ depends on the number of the previously evaluated tournaments. The index $i$ is 1 in the first DWZ and is increased by 1 after every tournament evaluation.

Also consider that:

$$5 \leq E \leq \begin{cases} \min(30; 5i), & \text{if } B=0\\ 150, &\text{if } B>0\end{cases}$$

This formula is only considered when a DWZ already exists, viz. $i$ is not only 0. So $E$ is normally increased to 5, if the coefficient is less than 5, or decreased to 30 if $E$ is higher than 30. If a braking factor is present ($B > 0$), $E$ can also go beyond 30.

The next step is to round $E$ to the nearest integer.

=== How to determine the first DWZ ===
To determine the first DWZ the basic formula may not be applied. With the ratio of points in percent and the probability table, the differential DWZ is determined. To this value the average DWZ of the competitors is added and the result is the first DWZ.

== DWZ values table ==
| DWZ score | Approximate meaning |
|---|---|
| < 1000 | Beginner |
| 1000–1300 | Intermediate |
| 1300–1600 | Average club player |
| 1600–1900 | Above average club player |
| 1900–2100 | Outstanding club player |
| 2100–2300 | League players |
| 2300–2500 | Federal League players |
| 2500–2700 | Grandmaster |
| > 2700 | World-class players |

== See also ==
- Chess rating system
- Elo rating system
