= Chris Furnis =

Chris Furniss
- Born: Vancouver, Washington
- Occupations: Comics artist, artist, UX
- Website: http://wasabisunshine.com/

Chris Furniss is the creator and illustrator of The 31 Days of Zero Suit Samus. He also host several radio shows and podcasts including The Weekly Geek, a geek culture and games review morning show, with Mark Hamill, Billy West, Jerry Holkins and others.

== Biography ==
Chris Furniss was born and raised in Vancouver, Washington, and spent his childhood playing in the woods, doodling on any piece of paper within reach, reading comics and fantasy novels, and playing video games with his little sister and attended Central Washington University in 2001 and graduated in 2005 with a bachelor's degree in studio art in 2002.

As of 2016, Furniss lives in Seattle, Washington, working on Plants vs. Zombies Heroes.

== Comic book credits ==
- The 31 Days of Zero Suit Samus – creator/writer/artist (Wasabi |Sunshine, 2012) with Maré Odomo, Zac Gorman, and Ted Martens.

== Video game credits ==
- 2014 Gears of War 2, Web Design Production (Microsoft Studios, Epic Games)
- 2015 Bejeweled Blitz, UX Lead (PopCap Games, Electronic Arts)
- 2016 Plants vs. Zombies Heroes, UX Lead (PopCap Games, Electronic Arts) (with Kevin Hanna, Jordan Kotzebue and Stephen Byrne)
