= Chessmetrics =

Chess rating system

Chessmetrics is a system for rating chess players devised by Jeff Sonas. It is intended as an improvement over the Elo and Edo rating systems.

== Implementation ==
Chessmetrics is a weighted average of past performance. The score considers a player's win percentage against other players weighted by the ratings of the other players and the time elapsed since the match. A 10% increase in performance is equivalent to an increase of 85 rating points.

The weighting of previous matches digresses linearly from 100% for just-finished matches to zero for matches conducted more than two years ago.

=== Formulas ===
Performance rating adjustment after tournament:

Performance Rating = Average Opponents' Rating + [(PctScore - 0.50) * 850]

Weighting of past tournaments (age is how many months ago the tournament was played):

100% * (24 - age)

== Reception ==
In 2006 economists Charles C. Moul and John V. C. Nye used Chessmetrics to determine the "expected" results of games, and wrote:

Ratings in chess that make use of rigorous statistics to produce good estimates of relative player strength are now relatively common, but comparing ratings across different time periods is often complicated by idiosyncratic changes (cf. Elo, 1968 for the pioneering discussion). Sonas uses the same rating formula throughout our sample and updates this rating monthly instead of annually, as is more common. Moreover, retrospective grading allows him to establish rankings that are unbiased estimates of the "true" relative strengths of players.

The system has also been described as "the most complete and resounding attempt made to determine the best chess player in history". However, the system is more accurate in measuring a player's success in competition than quality of play.

== Popularity ==
The original article on Chessmetrics was published in Chessbase in October 2002. Since then, Chessmetrics has become reasonably well known and features numerous articles in Chessbase and The Week in Chess.

Chess author John L. Watson has also referred to Chessmetrics numbers.

== See also ==
- Chess rating systems
