= Jen Vaughn =

American cartoonist

- Born: Jennifer Vaughn; 1983 (age 42–43) Oklahoma, U.S.
- Areas: Writer, Penciller, Inker, Letterer

Jen Vaughn (born 1983) is an American cartoonist, comic book creator, and game designer, best known for her work on licensed comics such as Adventure Time and Goosebumps, her independent series Cartozia Tales, and her role as a podcaster and designer in tabletop role-playing games.

== Personal life ==
Vaughn earned an M.F.A. in 2010 from the Center for Cartoon Studies. She is based in Washington state, where she shares a studio with comic artists Moritat, Brian Thies, and Stefano Gaudiano. Vaughn currently lives in Bordeaux, France.

== Career ==
Vaughn has written and illustrated comics for publishers including Boom! Studios, IDW, Vertigo, and various independent presses. She contributed to the Adventure Time franchise at Boom! Studios, writing and illustrating titles such as Adventure Time: 2013 Spoooktacular and Sugary Shorts. Her independent comics include Cartozia Tales and Avery Fatbottom: Renaissance Fair Detective. Vaughn has also written for Goosebumps: Download and Die (IDW Publishing, 2018), and contributed to Effigy (Vertigo), Princeless, Defend Comics, and more. Her work is noted for its humor, fantasy themes, and LGBTQ+ representation.

== Podcasting and tabletop gaming ==
Vaughn is a co-founder and a player in the all-femme-presenting Dungeons & Dragons actual play podcast D20 Dames. The show has been covered in the press for its positive, inclusive approach to gaming and community. Vaughn authored the D&D module The Experiments of Dr. Skulldial, based on the podcast. She is an advocate for diversity and accessibility in tabletop gaming.

In Euphoria Actual Play's Three-City Revamp, Vaughn along with a cast of European and European immigrants played Vampire: the Masquerade and folded in multiple languages into their mostly-English game: Dutch, French, German, and Vietnamese. Cusco Webfest 2025 awarded the group winner of Best International Actual Play - Video.

Vaughn is a GM for Seasonal Workers on the Tumble Through podcast, running original Pathfinder adventures.

== Video Games ==
Vaughn is a narrative designer and game designer for video games. The first video game Vaughn worked on is Plants vs. Zombies: Heroes, released in 2016, as a narrative designer and writer. She worked as a narrative designer and writer on mobile game Nicki Minaj: The Empire, released in 2016.

They currently are a narrative designer for Swiss-based company Strangers on the roguelit simulation game called Trailblazers: Into the March.

== Film credits ==
- Cartoon College (2012) – cast member

== Bibliography ==
=== Comics ===
- Adventure Time: 2013 Spoooktacular – writer/artist (Boom! Studios, 2013)
- Adventure Time: Sugary Shorts – writer/artist (Boom! Studios)
- Cartozia Tales – writer/artist
- Avery Fatbottom: Renaissance Fair Detective – writer/artist
- Goosebumps: Download and Die – writer (IDW, 2018)
- Effigy – artist (Vertigo, 2015)
- Princeless – contributor
- Defend Comics – contributor

=== Tabletop games ===
- No Dessert for the Dead - Brindlewood Bay mystery (2025)
- A Familiar Dream - original TTRPG, co-design with jess ross (2025)
- Up a Creek, Without a Heartbeat - Brindlewood Bay mystery (2025)
- The Creeping Hour - Brindlewood Bay supplement (2025)
- Love You, Mean It - Brindlewood Bay mystery (2025)
- Something to Dismember Me By: A Harrowing Hayride – Pathfinder adventure (2021)
- The Experiments of Dr. Skulldial – Dungeons & Dragons adventure (2019)
