= Elo hell =

Video gaming term

Elo hell (also known as MMR hell) is a video gaming term used in MOBAs and other multiplayer online games with competitive modes. It refers to portions of the matchmaking ranking spectrum where individual matches are of poor quality, and are often determined by factors such as poor team coordination which are perceived to be outside the individual player's control. This ostensibly makes it difficult for skilled players to "climb" up the matchmaking ranking (and out of Elo hell), due to the difficulty of consistently winning games under these conditions. Its existence in various games has been debated, and some game developers have called it an illusion caused by cognitive bias.

== History ==
The term was coined based on the Elo rating system designed by Arpad Elo, which was initially used for chess games but began to be used in video games as well. It was initially used by the League of Legends community, but spread in usage to other games that used the same ranking system. In these games, players are ranked based on their individual and team performance. Likewise, due to the nature of team-based gameplay, comparatively skilled players can still suffer damage to their rating due to the poor performance of their teammates. At low Elo, a skilled player will likely find it easy to rise in rank, while at high Elo, the quality of players improves. In League of Legends, it is said to occur between the 1300 and 1500 range.

Elo rankings have also been "abused" by players who create parties of their friends in order to "escape" Elo hell. This has been addressed by forcing players who are in groups to play against groups of similar size. Another way players have attempted to bypass Elo hell is by smurfing, or creating new accounts without a skill rating, which allows them to ascend in rank faster than they would with their original account.

Elo hell has also been noted as existing outside of video games, such as in the matchmaking app Tinder, which also uses a variant of the Elo rating system.

== Reception ==
Dom Sacco of Esports News UK claimed that Elo hell does exist in League of Legends, and that escaping it is possible, but is a "mammoth time sink".

== Examples ==
The third competitive season of Overwatch introduced changes in skill rating ostensibly designed to prevent players from being stuck in Elo hell. However, in season five of Overwatch, in-game "toxic" behavior and community backlash only increased due to tweaks in the game's Elo algorithms, causing the game's competitive mode to become "depressing".

From Year 7 Season 4 (Operation Solar Raid) onwards, Ubisoft implemented a new Ranked/Competitive play system into their game Rainbow Six Siege, named Ranked 2.0. This system split rating into two values, MMR and RP (Rank Points). MMR was implemented as an invisible value of matchmaking skill whereas RP was a visual representation of skill.
