= Ruby Blast =

2012 video game

- Developer: Zynga
- Designer: Jonathan Grant
- Artist: Kevin Hanna
- Release: Facebook, Zynga.com; June 19, 2012 iOS; November 15, 2012; Closed; January 4, 2014
- Genres: Puzzle, social network game
- Mode: Single-player with social features

Ruby Blast is a tile-matching video game by Zynga. The game was first released in June 2012 on Facebook and Zynga.com and later re-branded to Ruby Blast Adventures after Zynga added a new mode with map progression. An iOS version of Ruby Blast was released in November 2012 with an Android version expected soon. In the game, players try to match three or more gems to activate power ups and dig deeper into a mine. Ruby Blast on iOS is the first arcade mobile game from Zynga and the latest Zynga game that enables players to carry progress from the Web version to mobile. On December 5, 2013 it was announced that the game would be closed. Ruby Blast was closed on January 4, 2014.

The game's visual development was led in part by Zynga Seattle art director Kevin Hanna, whose team developed the Ruby Stone character and the game's Flash 11 presentation.

== Release ==
Ruby Blast was released June 19, 2012 for Facebook and Zynga.com in 15 languages and was the first game to launch simultaneously from both Zynga China and Zynga Seattle. Ruby Blast on Facebook and Zynga.com evolved into Ruby Blast Adventures, adding themed-level progression.

On November 15, 2012, Zynga released Ruby Blast on iOS devices and said an Android version would follow. The mobile version was released for 13 languages and was built by Zynga's China team.

Ruby Blast and Ruby Blast Adventures are free to play on the Web and on iOS devices. There is also a paid $1 iOS app.

As of late December 2012, the game had 9.9 million monthly active users across Web and mobile platforms.

== Gameplay ==
Ruby Blast and Ruby Blast Adventures are match 3 puzzle games in which players attempt to match three or more gems to help Ruby, the game's protagonist, recover ancient artifacts. As players match gems, they dig deeper into a mine by activating power-ups. In the connected, multi-platform game, all progress including scores, gems, coins, levels and in-game currency is synchronized between the mobile and Web versions. Players view their friends’ scores and compete to rise to the top of the leaderboard. Both the mobile and Web versions enable players to compete in weekly tournaments and offer ways to help out their friends. The Web game also offers an Adventure Mode, in which players advance through multiple levels and have the ability to compete against other players globally for prizes.
