= The Clockwork Girl (film) =

- Movie poster
- Based on: The Clockwork Girl by Sean O’Reilly & Kevin Hanna
- Written by: Jennica Harper; Claire Gibson
- Directed by: Kevin Hanna
- Starring: Carrie-Anne Moss; Alexa Vega; Jesse McCartney
- Music by: Peter Allen
- Country of origin: Canada
- Original language: English

Production
- Producers: Deboragh Gabler; Sean O'Reilly
- Running time: 85 minutes
- Production companies: Luximation; Arcana Studio; Legacy Filmworks

Original release
- Release: January 12, 2014

The Clockwork Girl is a 2014 Canadian animated film based on the comic book series Clockwork Girl, created by Sean O’Reilly and Kevin Hanna. It is directed by Kevin Hanna. It stars Carrie-Anne Moss, Alexa Vega and Jesse McCartney.

== Plot ==
In a world watched over by the Ancients (a police-like military force resembling Plague doctors), there was a town called Haraway, where everyone built marvelous inventions and created strange creatures, until a strange sickness called "The Blight" rendered most of the population to fall ill and some of their limbs useless. This prompted the townsfolk to seek aid from two brilliant scientists, which made the city split into separate factions between machinery and biological engineering, who refuse to work together due to their differing ideas.

One day, a nameless robot girl has recently been given the gift of life from her mechanical creator. While exploring the wonders of an ordinary world she meets a mutant boy named Huxley (who was created with two hearts) and they share a friendship that must overcome their warring families.

== Cast ==
- Carrie-Anne Moss as Admiral Wells
- Alexa Vega as Tesla
- Jesse McCartney as Huxley
- Brad Garrett as T-Bolt
- Jeffrey Tambor as Wilhelm the Tinkerer
- Adrian Hough as Dendrus
- Tyler Nicol as Barnaby the Marmokeet
- Kevin Hanna as See-Monster, and misc Marmokeets

== Production ==
With the release of the Clockwork Girl comic book series in 2007, co-creators Kevin Hanna and Sean O’Reilly confirmed they were working on an animated short adaptation. In July 2008, Arcana announced that it had received funding from Telefilm Canada to develop the concept into a movie. Jennica Harper joined as the film's writer in September 2008. A teaser for the movie was screened at San Diego Comic-Con in July 2009.

A stereoscopic 3D animated feature was formally announced in July 2010 at San Diego Comic-Con, with Hanna acting as the director and O'Reilly serving as producer. Luximation, a studio in Vancouver created specifically for the project, was confirmed to be animating it. At the same time, Alexa Vega, Jesse McCartney and Carrie-Anne Moss were cast in undisclosed roles, and funding from South Korean company CJ Entertainment was received. The following November, the film officially entered production, with Brad Garrett and Jeffrey Tambor joining the cast. At the 2012 San Diego Comic-Con, the film was previewed once again, with Arcana and co-production partner Legacy Filmworks noting that it would "release internationally in 2012."

== Release ==
The Clockwork Girl premiered in Canada on Super Channel on January 12, 2014. The film would see little distribution until 2021, when Vertical Entertainment acquired U.S. rights to the movie. It was released in the United Kingdom through video on demand platforms on January 11, 2021, with a theatrical release set for June 8, 2021 in the United States.
