= Kevin Hanna =

American film director

Kevin Konrad Hanna
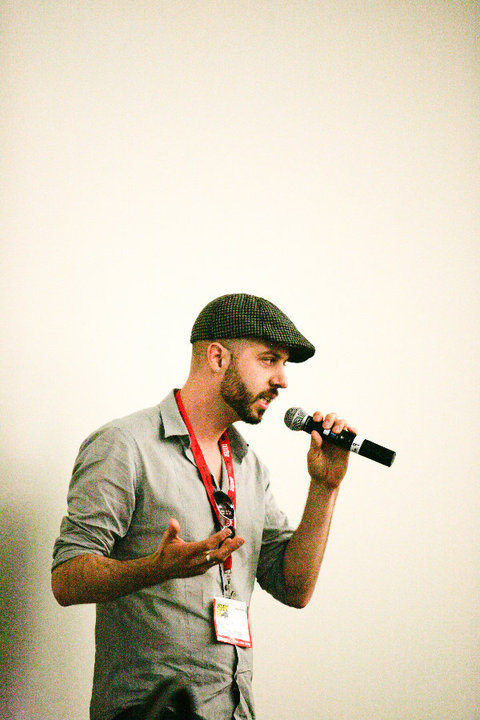
- Kevin Hanna speaking at Comic-Con, 2011
- Born: Kevin Konrad Hanna; 1980 (age 45–46); Mountain View, California, U.S.
- Occupations: Film director, screenwriter, artist, animator

Kevin Konrad Hanna (Arabic: كيفن حنا; born 1980) is a Syrian-American film director, writer, and artist, active in animation, comics, and video games. He is best known for directing the animated film The Clockwork Girl, the documentary Mike Mignola: Drawing Monsters, and leading digital production for Karol G’s Fortnite concert of her album Mañana Será Bonito.

== Biography ==
Hanna began working in the video game industry as a teenager, contributing to projects for Electronic Arts and Mattel. He later moved into animation and visual effects in Hollywood, working on projects such as Roughnecks: Starship Troopers Chronicles, Max Steel, and the music video for the Red Hot Chili Peppers' song "Californication".

He worked at Microsoft as part of the Xbox launch team, with credits on games including Crimson Skies: High Road to Revenge, Combat Flight Simulator, and Shadowrun. Hanna later joined Disney Interactive as an art director, working on multiple licensed titles.

In 2008, Hanna founded Frogchildren Studios, publishing original comics including Sixteen Miles to Merricks and Creature Academy: The Legacy, and producing animation and interactive content for clients such as Google Lively, Kinect for Xbox 360, and Disney XD.

Hanna's feature directorial debut, The Clockwork Girl, was released in 2014, and received a Moonbeam Award for Best Graphic Novel and the ForeWord Magazine Book of the Year Award. The graphic novel has been reviewed by outlets such as School Library Journal, and the film was noted for its visuals and appeal to young audiences.

He also directed the documentary Mike Mignola: Drawing Monsters, which premiered at film festivals in 2022 and featured interviews with Guillermo del Toro, Ron Perlman, Rebecca Sugar, and others. The film received positive reviews, was described as essential viewing for Hellboy fans, and was a top-ranked documentary on Apple TV upon its streaming release.

In 2025, Hanna directed the virtual concert Mañana Será Bonito for Karol G in Fortnite, a large-scale digital production blending live performance and interactive environments.

He continues to work on animation, film, and documentary projects, often in collaboration with producer Jim Demonakos.

== Film credits ==
- The Clockwork Girl (2014) – Director/Creator
- Mike Mignola: Drawing Monsters (2022) – Director/Producer

== TV credits ==
- Max Steel (2001)
- Red Hot Chili Peppers: Californication (2000)
- Roughnecks: Starship Troopers Chronicles (1999)
- Decrypting Krypton (2018) – Director/Creator
- Huey Lewis and the News: While We're Young (2020) – Director

== Comic book credits ==
- Frogchildren – Creator/Writer/Artist (Webcomic, 2005)
- Sixteen Miles to Merricks – Editor (Frogchildren Studios, 2008)
- Clockwork Girl – Co-creator/Writer/Artist (HarperCollins, 2011)
- Arcana Studio Presents #6: "Creepsville" (Arcana Studio, 2009)
- All-Star Western#1 – Color Assists (DC Comics, 2011)
- Creature Academy – Creator/Writer/Artist (Frogchildren Studios, 2013)
- Harley Quinn #28 – Artist (DC Comics, 2016)

== Video game credits ==
- 2003 – Toontown Online, Art Director (Disney)
- 2003 – Crimson Skies: High Road to Revenge, 3D Artist (Microsoft Game Studios)
- 2005 – Shadowrun, 3D Artist (Microsoft Game Studios)
- 2007 – Disney’s Princess: Royal Adventure, Art Director (Disney)
- 2007 – Disney's Chicken Little: Ace in Action, Art Director (Disney)
- 2007 – High School Musical: Sing It!, Art Director (Disney)
- 2007 – Dance Dance Revolution Disney Channel Edition, Art Director (Disney)
- 2007 – Meet the Robinsons, Art Director (Disney)
- 2007 – Pirates of the Caribbean, Art Director (Disney)
- 2007 – Google Lively, Creative Director, Art Director (Google)
- 2010 – ESPN on Xbox Live, Creative Director, Art Director (Microsoft Game Studios)
- 2012 – Ruby Blast, Art Director (Zynga)
- 2013 – Puzzle Charms, Art Director (Zynga)
- 2016 – Plants vs. Zombies Heroes, Art Director (PopCap Games, Electronic Arts)
- 2019 – Best Fiends, Commercial Director (Seriously Digital Entertainment)
- 2020 – Plants vs. Zombies 3, Art Director (PopCap Games, Electronic Arts)
- 2025 – Fortnite: Mañana Será Bonito Concert Experience, Director (Epic Games/Magnopus)

== Recognition ==
- 2008: Moonbeam Award for Best Graphic Novel for The Clockwork Girl
- 2008: Graphic Novel of the Year at Book Expo America by ForeWord magazine
- 2010: Mom's Choice Awards Gold Recipient: Comic Books & Graphic Novels
- 2022: Mike Mignola: Drawing Monsters won Best Documentary at FilmQuest, Gen Con, Chagrin Documentary Film Festival, Fantasmagoria, and Prague Independent Film Festival
