= DC Comics rating system =

Comic book content rating system

The DC Comics rating system is a system for rating the content of comic books used by DC Comics. In 2011, DC Comics withdrew from the Comics Code Authority and implemented an independent rating system. Rather than replicating the rating system used by Marvel Comics, DC Comics' system resembles video game ratings, specifically the ESRB. A few months later, Image Comics implemented a similar rating system.

== System ==
The DC Comics Rating System assigns each comic book one of the following ratings:

- E (EVERYONE): Appropriate for readers of all ages. May contain cartoonish violence.
- T (TEEN): Appropriate for readers age 12 and older. May contain mild violence, language, or suggestive themes.
- T+ (TEEN PLUS): Appropriate for readers age 15 and older. May contain moderate violence, moderate profanity, graphic imagery, or suggestive themes.
- M (MATURE): Appropriate for readers age 17 and older. May contain intense violence, extensive profanity, nudity, sexual themes, or other content suitable only for older readers.

== See also ==
- Marvel Comics rating system
