= Jeff Sonas =

Jeff Sonas is a statistical chess analyst who invented the Chessmetrics system for rating chess players, which is intended as an improvement on the Elo rating system. He is the founder and proprietor of the Chessmetrics.com website, which gives Sonas' calculations of the ratings of current players and historical ratings going back as far as January 1843. Sonas has written dozens of articles since 1999 for ChessBase.com and other chess websites. He was a participant in the FIDE ratings committee meeting in Athens, Greece in June 2010.

In 2002 he wrote for chessbase.com that a 24 k-factor would be ideal for predicting game results, instead of the standard 10 for high level players. In 2009 John Nunn wrote he needed more proof for the change. Sonas replied saying Nunn didn't thoroughly read his first article, but also says there is room for improvement, as he didn't analyze what it should be for low level players.

In 2011, after analyzing 1.5 million FIDE rated games, Sonas demonstrated according to the Elo formula, the actual results of two players having a rating difference of X, corresponded to a difference more like 5/6 X. This means stronger players were consistently losing points on average when playing significantly weaker-rated players, and vice versa, as the Elo formula overestimated the stronger player's expected advantage. He also showed that the 400-point rule made little sense and should be raised to 700–900, or be gotten rid of entirely. (The rule says that players with an Elo score more than 400 points apart will be treated as though they are only 400 points apart.)

Sonas graduated with honors with a B.S. in Mathematical and Computational Sciences from Stanford University in 1991.
