= Barron Storey =

American illustrator (born 1940)

- Born: April 6, 1940 (age 86); Dallas, Texas, US
- Education: ArtCenter College of Design, School of Visual Arts
- Known for: Painting, illustration
- Notable work: Lord of the Flies (cover, 1980 ed.)
- Awards: Society of Illustrators' Gold Medal, 1976, Society of Illustrators Distinguished Educator Award, 2001

Barron Storey (born 1940) is an American illustrator, graphic novelist, and educator. He is known for his accomplishments as an illustrator and fine artist, as well as for his career as a teacher. Storey has taught illustration since the 1970s and is on the faculty at San Jose State University. Storey lives in San Francisco, California.

== Early life and education ==
Barron Storey was born in 1940, in Dallas, Texas, to parents Juanita Williamson Storey, and Lewis Barron Storey, a teacher of the Carrollton-Farmers Branch Independent School District and a tract home developer in Carrollton, Texas.

He trained at ArtCenter College of Design in Los Angeles, and under Robert Weaver at the School of Visual Arts in New York City.

== Commercial art career ==
Barron Storey has been a commercial illustrator since the 1960s, and his clients have included major magazines such as Boys' Life, Reader's Digest, and National Geographic. His cover portraits for Time of Howard Hughes and Yitzhak Rabin hang in the Smithsonian's National Portrait Gallery. His giant painting of the South American rain forest hangs in New York's American Museum of Natural History, and a 1979 rendering of the space shuttle commissioned by NASA, the first official painting ever done of it, hangs in the Air and Space Museum on the National Mall.

As a book illustrator he has done cover illustrations for the Franklin Library classics, War and Peace, The Good Earth and Stories by Sinclair Lewis; as well as the covers of Fahrenheit 451 for Del Rey / Ballantine; and, most famously, the 1980 reissue of Lord of the Flies.

Storey has also published many comics and graphic novels, including The Marat/Sade Journals (Tundra), which was nominated for an Eisner Award, Neil Gaiman's The Sandman: Endless Nights (DC/Vertigo) which won an Eisner, Tales from the Edge #1-10, Barron Storey's WATCH Magazine (Vanguard), and Life After Black (Graphic Novel Art). Several of his students, including Scott McCloud, Peter Kuper, and Dan Brereton, have become leading figures in the graphic novel field.

== Academic career ==
Storey has taught at the School of Visual Arts, Pratt Institute, and San Jose State University.

Storey taught illustration for 30 years and co-chaired the Illustration Department at the California College of Arts and Crafts (now California College of the Arts), in Oakland, California.

== Awards ==
- 1976 Gold Medal, Society of Illustrators, for his portrait of Lotte Lenya
- 2001 Honoree, Distinguished Educator in the Arts, Society of Illustrators
- Eisner Award for The Sandman: Endless Nights.

== Exhibits ==
- os-cil-la-tor: Forty Years of Music Journals, Bert Green Fine Art, Chicago, IL, 2016.
- Factum 1 and Factum 2, Bert Green Fine Art, Chicago IL, 2013.
- Smithsonian National Portrait Gallery, Permanent Collection, Washington, D.C.
- RE: SEX, Solo Exhibition, Bert Green Fine Art, Los Angeles, CA, 2011.
- Tarot: An Artists' Vision of the Future, Group Exhibition, Galerie Petit Papiers, Bruxelles, Belgium, 2010.
- RE: Bob, Solo Exhibition, Anno Domini, San Jose, CA, 2010.
- Belle Foundation for Cultural Development, Grant, 2009.
- Cardboard Town, Solo Exhibition, Bert Green Fine Art, Los Angeles, CA, 2009.
- Life After Black: The Visual Journals of Barron Storey, Solo Exhibition, The American Museum of *Illustration/Society of Illustrators, New York, NY, 2009.
- Victims, Solo Exhibition, Anno Domini, San Jose, CA, 2007.
- Osseus Labyrint Retrospective, Solo Exhibition, Bert Green Fine Art, Los Angeles, CA, 2006.
- Black Iraq, Solo Exhibition, Anno Domini, San Jose, CA, 2003.
- More B.S. Than You Can Throw A Stick At, Solo Exhibition, Anno Domini, San Jose, CA, 2001.
- Screever, Solo Exhibition, Fifty 24SF, San Francisco, CA, 2001.
- Unfunny Comics, Solo Exhibition, Fobbo Gallery, San Francisco, CA, 1991.
- Grains of Sand: 25 Years of the Sandman, Cartoon Art Museum, San Francisco, CA, 2013-14.
- Suicide, Solo Exhibition, Anno Domini, San Jose, CA, 2013
- Quartet, Dual Exhibition with End of Time by Cellista, Anno Domini, San Jose, CA, 2016
- FACES RAW, Solo Exhibition, Anno Domini, San Jose, CA, 2018

== Collaborations ==
In 2016, Storey collaborated with composer Cellista on a dual exhibition. The two artists' respective titles were End of Time by Cellista and Quartet by Barron Storey. The exhibitions were presented at Anno Domini Gallery in downtown San Jose. The exhibition featured new work by both artists created in response to the history and legacy of Olivier Messiaen’s Quartet for the End of Time, a seminal work that has been a major influence on both artists’ practices.

As part of the exhibition, Cellista organized and performed a concert series at the gallery presenting Messiaen’s Quartet for the End of Time in its entirety by the Juxtapositions Chamber ensemble featuring pianist Naomi Stine, clarinetist James Pytko, and violinist Ishtar Hernandez. The performances coincided with the 75th anniversary of the quartet’s premiere. Both the exhibition and the concert series received critical acclaim.

== Praise from the art community ==
Author Neil Gaiman wrote in his blog, Neil Gaiman Journal, "Lots of people have learned from Barron Storey: Bill Sienkiewicz, and Dave McKean, and Kent Williams and many others, and they're all very proud to admit it. He's a true original, and there aren't many of those around." (October 27, 2003)

Artist and illustrator David Choe has been quoted as saying: "Nobody draws better than Barron. Not you, not your little sister, your architect dad, not your rebellious ex-boyfriend who draws with his own blood, not the most talented kid at your art school. Not your favorite artist in the whole world; I've seen the work with my own eyes. Nobody draws better than The Barron."

== Personal life ==
Storey married three times. Storey lost his mother, uncle, an ex-wife, and a best friend, to suicide.

== See also ==
- Eisner Award
- Endless Nights
