= Anno Domini (gallery) =

Coordinates: 37.33068°N 121.8861°W

- Anno Domini
- Location: San Jose, California
- Formerly called: Gallery Anno Domini

Anno Domini, also known as Gallery A.D., is a contemporary art gallery in San Jose, California, focusing on emerging and International artists in the genres of street art, zine culture and tattoo art.

== History ==
Anno Domini was started by graphic designers, Cherri Lakey and Brian Eder. The name of the gallery is inspired by the term for denoting years of the current era, Anno Domini, which is Latin for in the year of the Lord. Promoting zine culture, elevating graffiti and tattoo artists, and bringing attention to new and international artists has been a focus of the gallery programming. Historically Anno Domini has been active in First Friday and Street Mrkt events.

Many artists have shown their work at Anno Domini, often in the emerging stages of their career, including Titus Kaphar, David Choe, Joseph Loughborough. The gallery has featured art groups including Guerrilla News Network (in 2003); "Perpetual Motion Roadshow" (2012), and the collaborative work, "The FriendMakers" (in 2004) by the artists Don Pendleton, Craig Metzger, and Michael Sieben.
