= Chess rating system =

System used in chess to estimate the strength of a player

A chess rating system is a system used in chess to estimate the strength of a player, based on their performance versus other players. They are used by organizations such as FIDE, the US Chess Federation (USCF or US Chess), International Correspondence Chess Federation, and the English Chess Federation. Most of the systems are used to recalculate ratings after a tournament or match but some are used to recalculate ratings after individual games. Popular online chess sites such as Chess.com, Lichess, and Internet Chess Club also implement rating systems. In almost all systems, a higher number indicates a stronger player. In general, players' ratings go up if they perform better than expected and down if they perform worse than expected. The magnitude of the change depends on the rating of their opponents. The Elo rating system is currently the most widely used (though it has many variations and improvements). The Elo-like ratings systems have been adopted in many other contexts, such as other games like Go, in online competitive gaming, and in dating apps.

The first modern rating system was used by the Correspondence Chess League of America in 1939. Soviet player Andrey Khachaturov proposed a similar system in 1946. The first one that made an impact on international chess was the Ingo system in 1948. The USCF adopted the Harkness system in 1950. Shortly after, the British Chess Federation started using a system devised by Richard W. B. Clarke. The USCF switched to the Elo rating system in 1960, which was adopted by FIDE in 1970.

== Ingo system ==
This was the system of the West German Chess Federation from 1948 until 1992, designed by Anton Hoesslinger and published in 1948. It was replaced by an Elo system, Deutsche Wertungszahl. It influenced some other rating systems.

New players receive a high, fixed starting score. Players' new ratings centre on the average rating of entrants to their competition: then if having achieved better than a net draw set of result, minus the number of percentage points it is over 50% (e.g. a 12–4 or 24–8 wins-to-losses result is, as ever, noted as a 75% tournament outcome) – if having achieved worse than this then the number, again in percent, is added to the average of the tournament entrants' scores; thus in all cases recalibrating all players after each tournament completely. A consequence is at most 50 points gained or shed per tournament (namely by a totally winning or totally losing participant) away from the tournament average. Unlike other modern, nationally used chess systems, lower numbers indicate better performance.

== Harkness system ==
This system was noted in Chess Review by tournament organizer Kenneth Harkness, who expounded his invention of it in articles of 1956, 14 years later. It was used by the USCF from 1950 to 1960 and also by other organizations.

When players compete in a tournament, the average rating of their competition is calculated. If a player scores 50%, they receive the average competition rating as their performance rating. If they score more than 50%, their new rating is the competition average plus 10 points per percentage point exceeding 50. If they score less, their new rating is the competition average minus 10 points per percentage point shy of 50.

=== Example ===
A player with a rating of 1600 plays in an eleven-round tournament and scores 2½–8½ (22.7%) against competition with an average rating of 1850. This is 27.3% below 50% (50–22.7%), so their new rating is 1850 − (10 × 27.3) = 1577.

== English Chess Federation system ==
The ECF grading system was used by the English Chess Federation until 2020. It was published in 1958 by Richard W. B. Clarke. Each game has a large potential effect. Points (grades) are never immediately effective for every game won, lost or drawn, in a registered competition (including English congresses, local and county leagues, and registered, approved team events) but are averaged into personal grade (ECF Grade) over a cycle of at least 30 games.

A player's contributing score for such averaging is taken to be their opponent's grade (but the gap is deemed to be 40 points, if greater than such a grade gap). However this is adjusted by adding 50 points for a win, subtracting 50 points for a loss, and making no adjustment for a draw. Negative grades are deemed to be nil, so a personal score of 50 arose quickly in the lower leagues and experienced novices aspire to a 100 grading. The cyclical averaging and cycle-persistent Grades are its hallmarks. The maximum gain in a single cycle is 90 points, which would entail beating much higher-rated opponents at every match. The opposite applies to losses.

To convert between ECF and Elo grades, the formula ELO = (ECF × 7.50) + 700 was sometimes used.

== Elo rating system ==
The Elo system was invented by Arpad Elo and is the most common rating system. It is used by FIDE, other organizations and some Chess websites such as Internet Chess Club and chess24.com. Elo once stated that the process of rating players was in any case rather approximate; he compared it to "the measurement of the position of a cork bobbing up and down on the surface of agitated water with a yard stick tied to a rope and which is swaying in the wind". Any attempt to consolidate all aspects of a player's strength into a single number inevitably misses some of the picture.

FIDE divides all its normal tournaments into categories by a narrower average rating of the players. Each category is 25 rating points wide. Category 1 is for an average rating of 2251 to 2275, category 2 is 2276 to 2300, etc. Women's tournaments currently commence 200 points lower, including its Category 1.

Elo scales, 1978
Rating range	Category
2700+	No formal title, but sometimes informally known as "super grandmasters"
2500–2699	Grandmasters (GM)
2400–2499	International Masters (IM)
2300–2399	FIDE Masters (FM)
2200–2299	Candidate Masters (CM)
2000–2199	Experts
1800–1999	Class A, category 1
1600–1799	Class B, category 2
1400–1599	Class C, category 3
1200–1399	Class D, category 4
1000–1199	Class E, category 5
Below 1000	Novices

The USCF uses the USCF system, a modification of the Elo system, in which the K factor varies and it gives bonus points for superior performance in a tournament. USCF ratings are generally 50 to 100 points higher than the FIDE equivalents.

USCF rating categories
Category	Rating range
Senior master	2400 and up
National master	2200–2399
Expert	2000–2199
Class A	1800–1999
Class B	1600–1799
Class C	1400–1599
Class D	1200–1399
Class E	1000–1199
Class F	800–999
Class G	600–799
Class H	400–599
Class I	200–399
Class J	100–199

=== Example ===
Elo gives an example of amending the rating of Lajos Portisch, a 2635-rated player before his tournament, who scores 10½ points of a possible 16 winning points (as this is against 16 players). First, the difference in rating is recorded for each other player he faced. Then the expected score, against each, is determined from a table, which publishes this for every band of rating difference. For instance, one opponent was Vlastimil Hort, who was rated at 2600. The rating difference of 35 gave Portisch an expected score of "0.55". This is an impossible score as not 0, 1/2 or 1 but as this is higher than 0.5 even a draw will slightly damage Portisch's rating and slightly improve Hort's rating, so (ignoring their other results in the tournament) moving their ratings slightly closer together.

Portisch's expected score is summed for each of his matches, which gave him a total expected score of 9.66 for the tournament. Then the formula is:

new rating = old rating + (K × (W−W_{e}))

K is 10; W is the actual match/tournament score; W_{e} is the expected score.

Portisch's new rating is 2635 + 10 × (10.5 − 9.66) = 2643.4.

=== Linear approximation ===
Elo devised a linear approximation to his full system, negating the need for look-up tables of expected score. With that method, a player's new rating is

$R_{ new } = R_{ old } + K \left( \frac{W - L} {2} \right) + \left( \frac{K}{4C} \right) \sum_i D_i$

where R_{new} and R_{old} are the player's new and old ratings respectively, D_{i} is the opponent's rating minus the player's rating, W is the number of wins, L is the number of losses, C = 200 and K = 32. The term (W-L) / 2 is the score above or below 0. ΣD / 4C is the expected score according to: 4C rating points equals 100%.

The USCF used a modification of this system to calculate ratings after individual games of correspondence chess, with a K = 32 and C = 200.

== Glicko rating system ==
The Glicko system is a more modern approach, which was invented by Mark Glickman as an improvement of the Elo system. It is used by Chess.com, Free Internet Chess Server and other online chess servers. The Glicko-2 system is a refinement of the original Glicko system and is used by Lichess, Australian Chess Federation and other online websites.

== Turkey UKD system ==
TSF (Turkey Chess Federation) uses a combination of ELO and UKD system.

== USA ICCF system ==
The ICCF U.S.A. used its own system in the 1970s. It now uses the Elo system.

== Deutsche Wertungszahl ==
The Deutsche Wertungszahl system replaced the Ingo system in Germany.

== Chessmetrics ==
The Chessmetrics system was invented by Jeff Sonas. It is based on computer analysis of a large database of games and is intended to be more accurate than the Elo system.

== Universal Rating System ==
The Universal Rating System was developed by Mark Glickman, Jeff Sonas, J. Isaac Miller and Maxime Rischard, with the support of the Grand Chess Tour, the Kasparov Chess Foundation, and the Chess Club and Scholastic Center of Saint Louis.

== Rating systems using computers as a reference ==
Many rating systems give a rating to players at a given time, but cannot compare players from different eras. In 2006, Matej Guid and Ivan Bratko pioneered a new way of rating players, by comparing their moves against the recommended moves of a chess engine. The authors used the program Crafty and argued that even a lower-ranked program (Elo around 2700) could identify good players. In their follow-up study, they used Rybka 3 to estimate chess player ratings.

In 2017, Jean-Marc Alliot compared players using Stockfish 6 with an ELO rating around 3300, well above top human players.

== Chronology ==
- 1933 – The Correspondence Chess League of America (now ICCF U.S.A.) is the first national organization to use a numerical rating system. It chooses the Short system which clubs on the west coast of the US had used. In 1934 the CCLA switched to the Walt James Percentage System but in 1940 returned to a point system designed by Kenneth Williams.
- 1942 – Chess Review uses the Harkness system, an improvement of the Williams system.
- 1944 – The CCLA changes to an improved version of the Williams system devised by William Wilcock. A slight change to the system was made in 1949.
- 1946 – The USSR Chess Federation uses a non-numerical system to classify players.
- 1948 – The Ingo system is published and used by the West German Chess Federation.
- 1949 – The Harkness system is submitted to the USCF. The British Chess Federation adopts it later and uses it at least as late as 1967.
- 1950 – The USCF starts using the Harkness system and publishes its first rating list in the November issue of Chess Life. Reuben Fine is first with a rating of 2817 and Sammy Reshevsky is second with 2770.
- 1959 – The USCF names Arpad Elo the head of a committee to examine all rating systems and make recommendations.
- 1961 – Elo develops his system and it is used by the USCF. It is published in the June 1961 issue of Chess Life.
- 1970 – FIDE starts using the Elo system. Bobby Fischer is at the top of the list.
- 1978 – Elo's book (The Rating of Chessplayers, Past and Present) on his rating system is published.
- 1993 – Deutsche Wertungszahl replaces the Ingo system in Germany.
- 2001 – the Glicko system by Glickman is published.
- 2005 – Chessmetrics is published by Jeff Sonas.
- 2006 – Matej Guid and Ivan Bratko publish the research paper "Computer Analysis of World Chess Champions", which rates champions by comparing their moves to the moves chosen by the computer program Crafty.
- 2017 – Jean-Marc Alliot publishes the research paper "Who is the Master?", which rates champions by comparing their moves to Stockfish 6.

== See also ==
- Elo rating system
- Chess engine rating lists
- Sports rating system
- List of FIDE chess world number ones
- FIDE world rankings
