= Marvel Comics rating system =

Rating system in use at Marvel Comics

The Marvel Comics rating system is a system for rating the content of comic books, with regard to appropriateness for different age groups. In 2001, Marvel Comics withdrew from the Comics Code Authority and established its own rating system for its publications. This was precipitated by the CCA refusing approval of the seal due to the strong depiction of violence in X-Force #116, a comic written by Peter Milligan and drawn by Mike Allred. As well, by withdrawing from the CCA, this is seen as a move by editor-in-chief Joe Quesada to lure more high-profile creators to Marvel Comics. Modern ratings are usually found on the comic's UPC box.

== System ==
The Marvel Rating System assigns each comic book one of the following ratings:

- ALL AGES – Appropriate for all ages.
- T – Appropriate for most readers, but parents are advised that they might want to read before or with younger children.
- T+ TEENS AND UP – Appropriate for teens 13 and up.
- PARENTAL ADVISORY – Appropriate for 15 and up. Similar to T+, but featuring more mature themes or graphic imagery. Recommended for teen and adult readers.
- EXPLICIT CONTENT – Appropriate for 18 and up. Most Mature Readers books fall under the MAX imprint, which was created specifically for mature content titles. MAX and mature-themed titles continue to be designed to appear distinct from mainline Marvel titles, with the "MAX: Explicit Content" label prominently displayed on the cover.

== History ==
The first Marvel rating system was implemented in 2001, following their publishing of an issue of X-Force without the approval of self-regulatory system the Comics Code Authority (CCA). The CCA deemed the issue too violent, and following this, Marvel removed its entire line from the scrutiny of the Comics Code. Their age rating system used the following categories:

- ALL AGES
- PG (Parental Guidance)
- PG+
- PARENTAL ADVISORY/EXPLICIT CONTENT

However, the Motion Picture Association of America complained, as it holds a trademark on such classifications as PG and PG-13 (see MPAA film rating system). Marvel thus switched to the following system (by changing the PG ratings):

- ALL AGES
- PSR (Parental Supervision Recommended)
- PSR+
- PARENTAL ADVISORY/EXPLICIT CONTENT

Beginning in June 2005, Marvel switched to yet another system:

- ALL AGES
- A Appropriate for age 9 and up.
- T Recommended for TEEN AND UP UNLESS WITH PARENTAL SUPERVISION
- T+ SUGGESTED FOR TEEN AND UP
- PARENTAL ADVISORY
- MAX: EXPLICIT CONTENT

== See also ==
- DC Comics rating system

== Sources ==
- "Comic Books Need A Better Rating System" – Comic Book Daily
