= Brian Thies =

American comic book creator

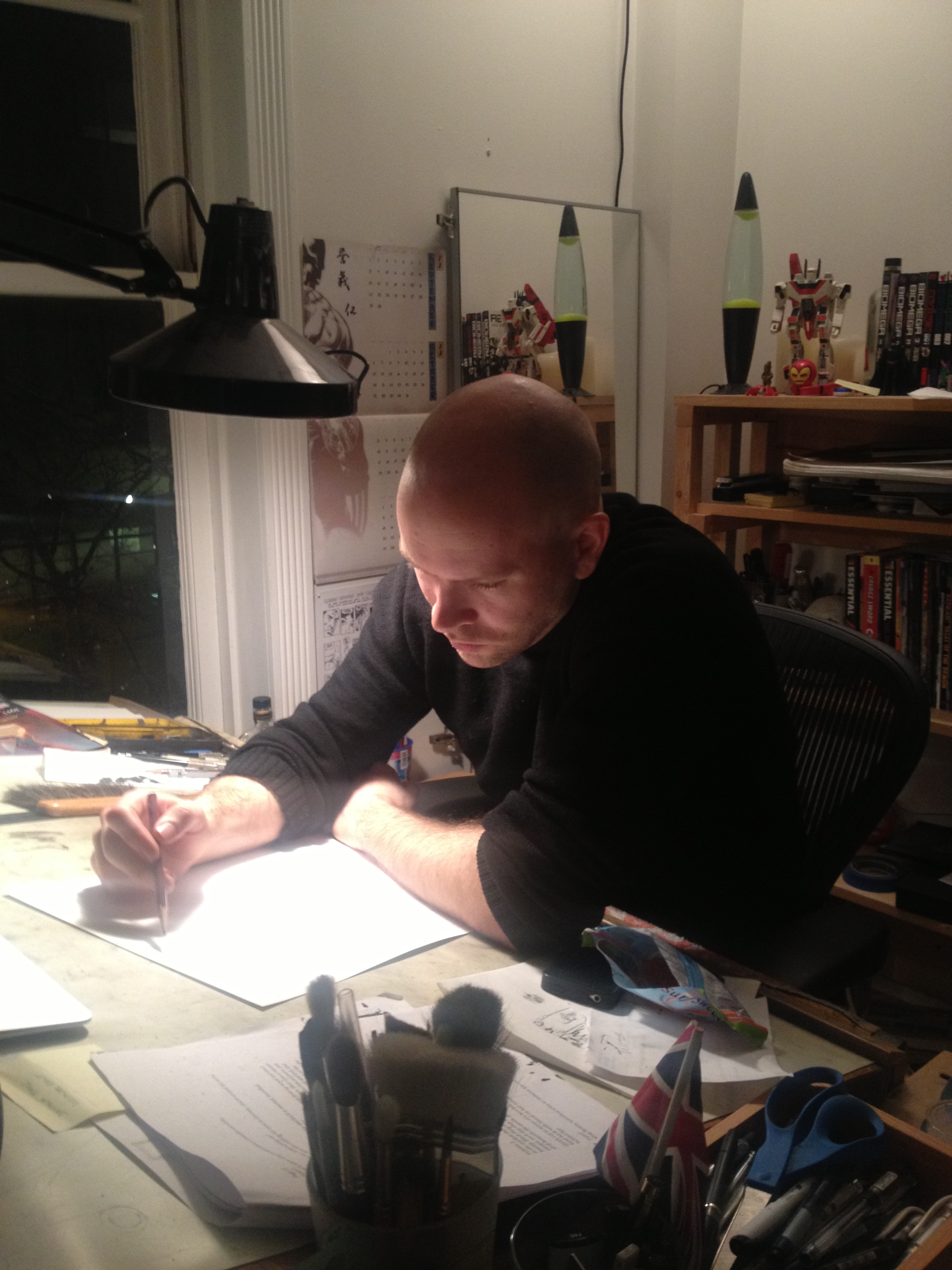
- Areas: Writer, Penciller, Inker, Letterer
- Notable works: Star Wars: Legacy, Predator: Hunters III, Secret Avengers, Winter Soldier

Brian Thies is an American comic book creator, artist, and inker best known for his work on Star Wars: Legacy from Dark Horse Comics, Predator: Life and Death and Predator: Hunters III, and Winter Soldier for Marvel, as well as contributions to Secret Avengers. Thies has also provided cover art for Valiant Comics’ Britannia: Lost Eagles of Rome. He is recognized for his emotive inking and dynamic sequential storytelling, contributing significantly to both licensed and creator-owned projects.

== Personal life ==
Thies is based in Seattle, Washington, where he shares a studio with fellow comic artists Moritat, Jen Vaughn, and Stefano Gaudiano. In interviews, Thies has discussed his evolution as an artist and his influences from manga and horror cinema.

== Career ==
Thies began working professionally in comics in the early 2010s, quickly establishing himself as a skilled penciller and inker. He has worked with major publishers including Marvel, Dark Horse, and Valiant. Thies's art has been featured in both interior pages and cover work, and he has collaborated with writers such as Chris Warner, Warren Ellis, and Peter Milligan.

In 2025, Thies launched Sanvean, a creator-owned science fiction comic series described as "Metal Gear Solid meets The X-Files," with influences from Cowboy Bebop and Akira. The project was successfully crowdfunded and has been completed and printed. Thies has shared updates and visuals of the finished book on his [official website], social media, and at comic art expos.

== Art style and reception ==
Thies is recognized for emotive and expressive inking, dynamic action sequences, and atmospheric settings. Reviews have praised his work on Predator: Life and Death for capturing the suspense and brutality of the franchise. He frequently draws on his background in manga, horror, and film to inform his visual storytelling.

== Bibliography ==
=== Penciller ===
- Star Wars: Legacy (Dark Horse Comics, 2013)
- Predator: Life and Death (Dark Horse Comics, 2016)
- Aliens vs. Predator: Life and Death (Dark Horse Comics, 2016)
- Predator: Hunters III (Dark Horse Comics, 2020)
- Britannia: Lost Eagles of Rome (Valiant Comics, 2018)
- X-O Manowar (Valiant Comics, issues TBA)
- The Amazing Spider-Man (Marvel Comics, various issues)
- Secret Avengers #19 (Marvel Comics, 2013, finishes with Stefano Gaudiano)
- Harbinger (Valiant Comics, 2012)
- Sanvean (creator-owned, 2025)

=== Inker ===
- Winter Soldier (Marvel Comics, 2012)
- Dark Tower: The Gunslinger – The Battle of Tull (Marvel Comics, 2011)
- Defenders (Marvel Comics, 2012)
- Secret Avengers #19 (Marvel Comics, 2013)
- Star Wars: Legacy (Dark Horse Comics, 2013)
- The Amazing Spider-Man (Marvel Comics, various issues)

=== Cover artist ===
- Britannia: Lost Eagles of Rome #1 (Valiant, 2018)
