= Meet the Parents (1992 film) =

American independent comedy film by Greg Glienna

- VHS cover
- Directed by: Greg Glienna
- Written by: Greg Glienna; Mary Ruth Clarke
- Produced by: James Vincent
- Starring: Greg Glienna; Jacqueline Cahill; Dick Galloway; Carol Whelan; Mary Ruth Clarke; James Vincent; John Da Cosse; Harry Hickstein; Mike Toomey; Emo Philips
- Cinematography: Bradley Sellers
- Edited by: Greg Glienna; James Vincent
- Music by: Scott May
- Release date: 1992
- Running time: 72 minutes
- Country: United States
- Language: English
- Budget: US $30,000-35,000 (estimated)

Meet the Parents is a 1992 American independent comedy film directed and edited by Greg Glienna, from a script he wrote with Mary Ruth Clarke. Glienna also wrote the original songs "Keep Smiling" (performed by Walter Tabayoyong) and "When Philip's There" (performed by Clarke), and stars as protagonist Greg, a young man who sets off a series of accidents while meeting his fiancée's parents and causes her family to fall apart.

Emo Philips served as an executive producer, wrote the film title's theme song (performed by Mary Louise Herrold), and cameos as a video store employee. Filmed on an approximately $30,000-$35,000 budget and shot in and around Chicago in 1991, Meet the Parents was not widely distributed and did not earn a large box-office profit in its limited release. Meet the Parents played art house theaters in the USA and the UK, until it was seen by director Steven Soderbergh, who thought it should be remade with a bigger budget and seen by a wider audience.

Several years after its release, Universal Pictures purchased the rights to the independent film and hired screenwriter Jim Herzfeld to expand the script. The film went through several rewrites, with much of the dark humor removed. A remake, released in October 2000, inspired three movie sequels.

== Plot ==
A man and his fiancée driving out to meet her parents stop to get gas at a gas station. The man mentions his plans to the owner, who advises him against it, then begins the tale of Greg: an advertising agent from Chicago who met his fiancée Pam's parents, Irv and Kay Burns, in a small town in Indiana for a weekend that ended disastrously.

Despite his efforts to impress the Burnses, Greg sets off a number of mishaps. He breaks Irv's Victrola, overflows the toilet, ruins Kay's roast, rents a film starring Andy Griffith as a rapist and chainsaw killer, nearly stabs Kay's eye with a fishing pole, gets framed for marijuana planted in his suitcase and a $50 bill missing from Kay's purse, collides with a hit-and-run driver while in the family's car, drowns their dog Bingo after throwing a stick into a lake, and earns the wrath of Pam's ex-boyfriend Lee at a bar when he declines Lee's offer to dance with her.

Throughout the visit, Pam's sister Fay, an aspiring singer and the true marijuana user, insists Greg hear her Star Search audition since she mistakenly thinks he has ties with Ed McMahon, who appeared as a spokesperson in a commercial Greg wrote. On the second night, Greg, who has been told to sleep on the living room couch, searches for Pam's bedroom and enters Fay's.

Near the end of the visit, Fay steals the starter motor from Greg's car and hides it in her bedroom, so Greg and Pam cannot leave as intended. He and Irv spend hours trying to fix the car with no success. After reentering the house and causing more accidents, Greg plans to flee with Pam, who urges him to stay one more night. He then unintentionally causes a portrait of Irv's late mother Penny to fall on an urn containing her ashes.

With no reputation left to lose, Greg listens to Fay sing a ballad entitled "When Philip's There". She begs him for suggestions, and he reluctantly gives slight criticism, leaving her furious. Fay then tells her family Greg entered her room the previous night but claims he wanted to cheat on Pam with her. Pam locks herself in her room, and Greg, failing to convince her to come out, starts to leave, not noticing that Fay has hanged herself with a sign reading "Greg killed me" around her neck. As he opens the front door, he and Pam's parents hear Pam screaming upstairs. Irv discovers Fay's body, rushes downstairs, and fires his gun as Kay attempts to intervene.

When asked if Irv killed Greg, the gas station owner explains that Irv accidentally killed Kay and Pam, then died of a heart attack, while Greg is still alive and well. The customer leaves, now uneasy about meeting his fiancée's parents. Another customer arrives on his way to take his children to a circus, and the owner advises him against it, beginning a new story.

== Cast ==
- John Da Cosse as First Customer
- Karen Ann Gronowski as Fiancée
- James Vincent as Gas Station Owner
- Greg Glienna as Greg
- Jacqueline Cahill as Pamela "Pam" Burns
- Dick Galloway as Irv Burns, Pam's father
- Carol Whelan as Kay Burns, Pam's mother
- Mary Ruth Clarke as Fay Burns, Pam's sister
- Bingo as himself
- Emo Philips as Video Store Employee (Note: Although this character wears a name tag indicating that his name is Emo, he is never addressed by name in spoken dialogue, and this is how he is listed in the end credits.)
- Domenic Sfreddo as Hit & Run Driver
- Harry Hickstein as Lee
- Mike Toomey as Priest, TV voices
- Marc Vann as Second Customer

Additionally, Dan Rhode appears as Lee's friend at the bar; in the same scene, John B. Nix portrays the bartender. Tony Boswell, Ricky Conner, Kay Cammon, and Vince Maranto play the bar patrons who pursue Greg and Pam along with Lee and his friend when the couple flees the bar. Poppy Champlin and Bob Rumba provide additional TV voices. The likeness of Patsy Glenn appears as Irv's mother Penny.

== Development and production ==
Glienna conceived of the core idea for Meet the Parents while studying improvisational comedy at The Second City in the 1980s. He improvised a scene with a friend in which he portrayed a man meeting his girlfriend's father. This evolved into an approximately five-minute short film entitled The Vase, in which Glienna played a man meeting his date's parents who ultimately soils his reputation when he breaks their prized vase. Glienna then planned to make an expanded version of the story with humor inspired by silent films, particularly those of Buster Keaton, as he found the situations presented in them could be humorous with or without dialogue. He and Clarke wrote the 80-page screenplay for Meet the Parents in one month, to the approval of Emo Philips, who signed on as a producer. Filming was completed in two weeks, and many scenes were shot in one take. A house owned by a friend of Glienna's mother was used as the Burns family home.

== Release ==
Meet the Parents premiered at the Gene Siskel Film Center, then known as The Film Center of the School of the Art Institute of Chicago, in July 1991. The following year, it was publicly released in scattered independent film theaters across the United States as well as a few film festivals in London and Edinburgh. Some of the most positive reactions came from British audiences, who favorably compared its humor to darker comedy styles established in British television series such as Steptoe and Son or Fawlty Towers.

== Reception ==
In its private premier, Meet the Parents was well received by Dave Kehr of The Chicago Tribune, who called it "a very funny, very original piece of work".

Film critic Suzan Ayscough reviewed the film for Variety magazine in 1992. In her review, she called the film a "wonderfully twisted black comedy" even though she believed it to be "excessive and occasionally overdone". Ayscough predicted that the film "could garner a cult following among anti-establishment urbanites" due to its "blatant attack on marriage, suburban indifference, Christian hypocrisy and the nuclear family" and unsuitability for mainstream audiences. Opining that the "script desperately needed an objective eye", she concluded by calling the film an "amusing vehicle which aptly displays the multiple talents of Greg Glienna".

Film producer Elliot Grove, founder of Raindance Film Festival and the British Independent Film Awards, listed the original Meet the Parents on his personal Top Ten list of favorite films. In the article, he called it "much funnier and tighter than the Hollywood version".

Film critic Jonathan Rosenbaum liked the film and was tempted to call it, "the ultimate worst-case-scenario comedy". He said it "may not always make you laugh but will impress you with the singularity of Glienna’s dark approach". He also added that the audience was "still likely to be taken by the purity and relentlessness of this picture's vision".

Terry Francis of Southern Voice commented: "Although 'Meet the Parents' isn't a terribly original movie—its jokes never sail higher than a good 'Saturday Night Live' sketch—it takes chances that are fairly vast in comparison to the standard issue comedies coming out of Hollywood".

== Legacy ==
Glienna attempted to strike a deal with National Lampoon to release the film on home video, but this fell through. Following the 2000 remake of Meet the Parents, Universal Pictures has not allowed him to release the original film in any form of home media. In a 2024 interview with Darren Richman of the British film magazine Little White Lies, Glienna commented that his lawyer did not distinguish between the script and the film in the contract he made with Universal at the time, thus causing the studio to buy the rights to the entire film. Consequently, he has repeatedly uploaded the original Meet the Parents to his official YouTube channel, only to have it often forcibly taken down. The film has since been uploaded to other online sources, although they are difficult to locate.

=== 2000 remake and its sequels ===
Producer Nancy Tenenbaum acquired the rights to the original film and sent a copy to several people of interest, hoping to have a new version of the film made. Filmmaker Steven Soderbergh replied that he was interested and that he wanted to direct a remake. He brought it to the attention of Universal Studios, who initially declined but subsequently optioned the rights to the film in 1995. Soderbergh took on the project but dropped it to focus on directing Out of Sight.

In 1995, Universal Studios purchased the rights to the film. Glienna and Clarke were contacted by Soderbergh to rewrite their script for mainstream audiences. After a couple of early drafts, parts of which were included in the final film, the pair received only a story credit. The screenplay was expanded by screenwriter Jim Herzfeld, and film director Jay Roach was hired to direct the 2000 version of Meet the Parents, with Ben Stiller and Robert De Niro cast in the leading roles. Distributed by Universal Studios domestically and by DreamWorks Pictures internationally through United International Pictures, the remade film was a big financial success earning $166.2 million in the United States and a total of $330.4 million worldwide.

The 2000 version in turn inspired two movie sequels, Meet the Fockers (2004) and Little Fockers (2010). A fourth film in the series, Focker-in-Law, will be released on November 25, 2026.

== See also ==
- Cinema of the United States
- List of American films of 1992
