= Meet the Parents (film series) =

American romantic comedy film series

- DVD cover art for collected edition
- Directed by: Jay Roach (1–2); Paul Weitz (3); John Hamburg (4)
- Produced by: Robert De Niro; Jane Rosenthal; Jay Roach; John Hamburg (3–4); Nancy Tenenbaum (1); Ben Stiller (4); John Lesher (4)
- Starring: Robert De Niro; Ben Stiller; Teri Polo; Blythe Danner; Owen Wilson; Dustin Hoffman; Barbra Streisand; (More)
- Cinematography: Peter James (1); John Schwartzman (2); Remi Adefarasin (3)
- Music by: Randy Newman (1–2); Stephen Trask (3); Theodore Shapiro (4)
- Production companies: TriBeCa Productions; Red Hour Productions (4)
- Distributed by: Universal Pictures; DreamWorks Pictures (1–2); Paramount Pictures (3–4)
- Release dates: October 6, 2000 (Meet the Parents); December 22, 2004 (Meet the Fockers); December 22, 2010 (Little Fockers); November 25, 2026 (Focker-in-Law)
- Running time: 321 minutes
- Country: United States
- Language: English

Meet the Parents is a comedy film series based on the 1992 independent film of the same name. It follows the character Greg Focker (Ben Stiller) as he interacts with his family and in-laws. The series is made up of three films: Meet the Parents (2000), Meet the Fockers (2004) and Little Fockers (2010). A fourth film, titled Focker-in-Law, will be released on November 25, 2026. The series primarily stars Ben Stiller, Robert De Niro, Teri Polo, Blythe Danner, Owen Wilson, Dustin Hoffman, and Barbra Streisand. The three films earned over $1.15 billion at the box office.

== 1992 independent film ==
Before the remake in 2000, Greg Glienna and Mary Ruth Clarke cowrote the original independent film, Meet the Parents, released in scattered independent film theaters in 1992. Glienna also directed the film, wrote two original songs, and starred as protagonist Greg: a Chicago advertising agent who travels with his fiancée Pam Burns to meet her parents, Irv and Kay, for a weekend but sets off a series of accidents and causes the family to fall apart. Throughout the visit, Pam's sister Fay, an aspiring singer, insists that Greg listen to her Star Search audition since she mistakenly thinks he has ties with Ed McMahon, who was cast as a spokesperson in a commercial Greg wrote. In the end, Greg alone survives: after Fay hangs herself, having accused Greg of wanting to cheat on Pam with her and framed him for her suicide, both out of revenge for his reluctantly criticizing her singing, Irv attempts to shoot him but accidentally kills Kay and Pam before dying of a heart attack.

Several years after the film's release, Universal Pictures purchased the rights to the independent film. After hiring screenwriter Jim Herzfeld to expand the script, a new version of Meet the Parents was filmed and released in October 2000.

== Legacy ==
The success of Meet the Parents was initially responsible for a 2002 NBC reality television show titled Meet My Folks in which a young woman's love interest, vying for her family's approval, is interrogated by the woman's overprotective father with the help of a lie detector machine. In September 2002, NBC also aired a situation comedy titled In-Laws. During the development of the sitcom, NBC called it "a Meet the Parents project" which prompted an investigation by Universal into whether NBC was infringing on Universal's copyright. Universal did not pursue any action against NBC, but neither show lasted more than one season. NBC and Universal merged on a corporate level two years later in 2004.

On July 18, 2005, a regularly scheduled American Airlines flight from Fort Lauderdale-Hollywood International Airport to San Juan, Puerto Rico, had to be diverted back to Fort Lauderdale shortly after take-off due to a bomb threat. The pilot turned the airplane around approximately 40 minutes into the flight after a flight attendant found a crumpled napkin that read "Bomb, bomb, bomb ... meet the parents"; media sources speculated that this was a reference to the scene in which Ben Stiller's character repeatedly shouts the word "bomb" while being detained by airport security. The airplane was met by a bomb squad of the local sheriff's office as well as the FBI whose agents questioned the plane's 176 passengers about the note.

== Universal Films ==
Film	U.S. release date	Director(s)	Screenwriter(s)	Producer(s)
Meet the Parents	October 6, 2000	Jay Roach	Jim Herzfeld, John Hamburg, Greg Glienna & Mary Ruth Clarke	Jay Roach, Jane Rosenthal, Robert De Niro & Nancy Tenenbaum
Meet the Fockers	December 22, 2004	Jay Roach	Marc Hyman, Jim Herzfeld & John Hamburg	Jay Roach, Jane Rosenthal & Robert De Niro
Little Fockers	December 22, 2010	Paul Weitz	John Hamburg & Larry Stuckey	Jay Roach, John Hamburg, Jane Rosenthal & Robert De Niro
Focker-in-Law	November 25, 2026	John Hamburg	John Hamburg	Jay Roach, Ben Stiller, John Lesher, John Hamburg, Jane Rosenthal & Robert De Niro

=== Meet the Parents (2000) ===
In the first film of the series, Greg Focker, a Jewish American nurse living in Chicago, travels to Long Island, New York with his girlfriend Pam Byrnes to meet her parents, Jack and Dina, intending to earn their blessing during the weekend of Pam's sister's wedding so he can propose in front of her family. However, Jack is an overly suspicious retired CIA agent who distrusts every one of Pam's suitors. Despite Greg setting off a series of accidents and misunderstandings, Jack ultimately realizes how much Pam loves him and makes amends with him.

=== Meet the Fockers (2004) ===
Greg takes Pam, now his fiancée, along with Jack and Dina to Miami, Florida, to meet his eccentric and free-spirited parents: Bernie and Roz, a retired attorney and a sex therapist for elderly couples, respectively. Conflict erupts between Jack and the Fockers due to their constrasting backgrounds, personalities, and parenting methods; while Pam secretly tells everyone but Jack that she is pregnant. Jack becomes suspicious of the Fockers' maid Isabel's son, Jorge, who strikingly resembles Greg, and doses Greg with truth serum to make him blurt out that Jorge is his son and Pam is pregnant. However, Greg denies knowledge of Jorge the next day, and Dina turns everyone against Jack due to his inability to trust people. As Jack attempts to leave, Bernie and Greg go after him, and all three are arrested for speeding after Jack learns of Jorge's actual father. Upon release, Greg brokers peace between Bernie and Jack just in time for his and Pam's wedding.

=== Little Fockers (2010) ===
Greg, now father to twins Henry and Samantha, is chosen by Jack, who is suffering from a heart condition, to succeed him as the Byrnes family patriarch in place of Bob Banks, who divorced his older daughter Debbie. Jack once again becomes suspicious of Greg when he sees him with drug representative Andi Garcia, who openly flirts with him, and plans to have Pam remarried to her ex-fiancé Kevin Rawley. A misunderstanding about Andi apparently making sexual advances towards Greg while drunk causes Jack to fight Greg at the twins' birthday party the next day until he has a non-lethal heart attack. Impressed by Greg taking charge of the situation and using his observation skills to confirm Greg's innocence, Jack approves of him as a trustworthy patriarch in his own right.

=== Focker-in-Law (2026) ===
In December 2024, it was reported that Stiller, De Niro, Danner and Polo were in early talks to star in a new Meet the Parents film. On March 20, 2025, it was officially announced that a fourth Meet the Parents film was in development, with John Hamburg, who wrote each of the first three films, directing in addition to writing the film.

On May 30, 2025, it was announced that the film would be released on November 25, 2026, and that Ariana Grande would join the cast. Additionally, Stiller along with De Niro, Danner, Polo and Wilson are confirmed to be reprising their roles. In late July, Skyler Gisondo was in talks to join the film. Later that month, it was announced that the film had been titled Focker-in-Law.

Principal photography began on August 18, 2025, in New York City and wrapped on November 4.

== Reception ==
=== Critical reception ===
Film	Rotten Tomatoes	Metacritic	CinemaScore
Meet the Parents	85% (147 reviews)	73 (33 reviews)	A−
Meet the Fockers	38% (163 reviews)	41 (34 reviews)	B+
Little Fockers	10% (147 reviews)	27 (32 reviews)	B−

=== Box office performance ===
Film	Release date	Budget	Box Office revenue			Rank		Reference
Film	Release date	Budget	North America	International	Worldwide	All time domestic	All time worldwide	Reference
Meet the Parents	October 6, 2000	$55 million	$166,244,045	$164,200,000	$330,444,045	#312	#428	
Meet the Fockers	December 22, 2004	$80 million	$279,261,160	$243,396,776	$522,657,936	#106	#204	
Little Fockers	December 22, 2010	$100 million	$148,438,600	$162,211,985	$310,650,585	#380	#467	
Total		$235 million	$593,943,805	$569,808,761	$1,163,752,566			

== Recurring characters ==
Note: A gray cell indicates character did not appear in that film.

Character	Meet the Parents	Meet the Parents	Meet the Fockers	Little Fockers	Focker-in-Law
Character	1992	2000	2004	2010	2026
Gaylord Myron "Greg" Focker (Universal films) Greg (1992 film)	Greg Glienna	Ben Stiller	Ben Stiller	Ben Stiller	Ben Stiller
Pamela "Pam" Martha Byrnes (Universal films) Pamela "Pam" Burns (1992 film)	Jacqueline Cahill	Teri Polo	Teri Polo	Teri Polo	Teri Polo
Jack Tiberius Byrnes (Universal films) Irv Burns (1992 film)	Dick Galloway	Robert De Niro	Robert De Niro	Robert De Niro	Robert De Niro
Dina Byrnes (Universal films) Kay Burns (1992 film)	Carol Whelan	Blythe Danner	Blythe Danner	Blythe Danner	Blythe Danner
Deborah "Debbie" Byrnes (Universal films) Fay Burns (1992 film)	Mary Ruth Clarke	Nicole DeHuff			
Father O'Boyle (Universal films) Priest (1992 film)	Mike Toomey	William Severs			
Kevin Rawley		Owen Wilson	Owen Wilson	Owen Wilson	Owen Wilson
Flight Attendant		Kali Rocha	Kali Rocha		
Dr. Robert "Bob" Banks		Thomas McCarthy		Thomas McCarthy	
Denny Byrnes		Jon Abrahams			
Larry Banks		James Rebhorn			
Linda Banks		Phyllis George			
Bernard "Bernie" Focker		Mentioned	Dustin Hoffman	Dustin Hoffman	
Rosalind "Roz" Focker		Mentioned	Barbra Streisand	Barbra Streisand	
Officer Vern LeFlore			Tim Blake Nelson		
Isabel Villalobos			Alanna Ubach		
Jorge Villalobos			Ray Santiago		
Judge Ira Goldfarb			Shelley Berman		
Jack Banks			Spencer & Bradley Pickren		
Henry Focker				Colin Baiocchi	Skyler Gisondo
Samantha Focker				Daisy Tahan	Beanie Feldstein
Andi Garcia				Jessica Alba	
Prudence Simmons				Laura Dern	
Randy Weir				Harvey Keitel	
Nurse Louis				Kevin Hart	
Junior				Yul Vazquez	
Olivia Jones					Ariana Grande
