= Meet the Parents (disambiguation) =

Meet the Parents is a 2000 comedy film directed by Jay Roach, a remake of the 1992 film.

Meet the Parents may also refer to:

- Meet the Parents (1992 film), an independent low-budget comedy by Greg Glienna
- Meet the Parents (film series), a comedy film series that began with the 2000 film
- Meet the Parents (soundtrack), original motion picture soundtrack for the 2000 film
- Meet the Parents (TV series), a 2010 British reality series shown on E4
- "Meet the Parents" (Good Luck Charlie), a 2011 television episode
- "Meet the Parents", a 2012 television episode of Best of Luck Nikki, the Indian adaptation of Good Luck Charlie
- "Meet the Parents" (Queer as Folk), a 1999 television episode
- "Meet the Parents", a song by Kim Petras from Clarity

== See also ==
- "Meat the Parents", the 2001 series premiere of the television series Wolf Lake
