= Meet the Parents =

2000 film by Jay Roach

- Theatrical release poster
- Directed by: Jay Roach
- Screenplay by: Jim Herzfeld; John Hamburg
- Story by: Greg Glienna; Mary Ruth Clarke
- Based on: Meet the Parents by: Greg Glienna; Mary Ruth Clarke
- Produced by: Nancy Tenenbaum; Jay Roach; Jane Rosenthal; Robert De Niro
- Starring: Robert De Niro; Ben Stiller; Blythe Danner; Teri Polo; James Rebhorn; Jon Abrahams; Owen Wilson
- Cinematography: Peter James
- Edited by: Jon Poll; Greg Hayden
- Music by: Randy Newman
- Production companies: DreamWorks Pictures; Nancy Tenenbaum Productions; Tribeca Productions
- Distributed by: Universal Pictures (United States and Canada); DreamWorks Pictures (through United International Pictures; international)
- Release date: October 6, 2000
- Running time: 108 minutes
- Country: United States
- Language: English
- Budget: $55 million
- Box office: $330 million

Meet the Parents is a 2000 American romantic comedy film directed by Jay Roach, and written by Jim Herzfeld and John Hamburg. It stars Ben Stiller as Greg Focker, a nurse who visits his girlfriend Pam's parents, overprotective Jack (Robert De Niro) and pacifistic Dina (Blythe Danner), and suffers from a series of unfortunate events. Teri Polo stars as Pam, and Owen Wilson stars as Pam's ex-boyfriend Kevin.

The film is a remake of the 1992 film of the same name directed by and starring Greg Glienna, who also wrote the screenplay alongside Mary Ruth Clarke. Universal Pictures purchased the rights to Glienna's film with the intent of creating a new version. Herzfeld expanded the original script but development was halted for some time. Roach read the expanded script and expressed his desire to direct it. At that time, DreamWorks Pictures' Steven Spielberg was interested in directing while Jim Carrey was interested in playing the lead role. Universal offered the film to Roach only after Spielberg and Carrey left the project.

Meet the Parents was released on October 6, 2000, by Universal Pictures in the United States and Canada, and by DreamWorks Pictures internationally through United International Pictures. A commercial success, the film grossed $330 million worldwide on a $55 million budget, and was well received by critics, winning several awards and earning additional nominations. Stiller won two comedy awards for his performance, and the film was chosen as the Favorite Comedy Motion Picture at the 2001 People's Choice Awards. It was followed by the sequels Meet the Fockers (2004) and Little Fockers (2010). A fourth film in the franchise titled Focker-in-Law will be released on November 25, 2026.

== Plot ==
Greg Focker, a Jewish-American nurse living in Chicago, intends to propose to his girlfriend of ten months, second-grade teacher Pam Byrnes. He chooses to get her father's blessing at her sister Debbie's wedding at their parents' house on Long Island, and plans to propose to her in front of her family. This plan is put on hold when the airline loses his luggage, which contains the engagement ring after airport security refused to let him take it through the x-ray machine and making him check it in.

At the Byrneses' house, Greg meets Pam's father Jack, mother Dina, and beloved cat Mr. Jinx. Despite displaying a friendly demeanor toward Greg, Jack is immediately suspicious of him and is critical of his choice of career as a nurse. Greg gifts Jack an extremely rare flower, but Jack does not recognize it, although he claims to be a retired florist.

Greg becomes more uncomfortable after he receives an impromptu lie detector test from Jack. Pam explains that Jack's profession as a florist is a cover, and that he is actually a retired CIA operative who interrogated double agents.

Meeting the rest of Pam's family and friends, including Debbie's future in-laws, Greg becomes insecure about his relationship with the former when he learns that she was previously engaged. Her ex-fiancé Kevin is amiable, wealthy, and still on friendly terms with her and her family. He is also the best man in Debbie's wedding.

Despite efforts to impress Pam's family, Greg's inadvertent actions make him an easy target for ridicule. He accidentally injures Debbie during a pool volleyball game, floods the backyard with sewage by flushing a broken toilet, breaks an urn containing the ashes of Jack's mother that Mr. Jinx uses as kitty litter, and loses a cigarette while chasing Mr. Jinx on the roof, inadvertently setting on fire the wedding altar that Kevin built. Jack also suspects that Greg is a marijuana user after he endorses the marijuana interpretation of "Puff, the Magic Dragon". Jack's suspicion increases when he catches Pam's brother Denny retrieving a marijuana pipe from a jacket that he lent to Greg, which Denny hastily lies about being Greg's.

After losing Mr. Jinx, Greg temporarily replaces him with a nearly identical stray whose tail he has spray-painted, while buying time to find the real cat. While the family are at the engagement party, the imposter cat makes a mess of the house, including destroying Debbie's wedding dress. Greg's deception is exposed when a neighbor finds the real Mr. Jinx and Jack confronts Greg, so the entire Byrnes family demands that he leave Long Island.

Jack accuses Greg of lying about taking the Medical College Admission Test because his CIA contacts could not find any record of a Greg Focker. Greg retaliates by revealing that he has seen Jack engaging in secret meetings, receiving passports and speaking in Thai over the phone. He deduces that Jack has taken on a new CIA mission, but Jack angrily reveals that he was arranging a surprise honeymoon in Thailand for Debbie and her fiancé Bob.

A devastated Greg drives to the airport to return to Chicago but gets so angry that he is eventually detained by airport security for refusing to check in his luggage and for saying the word "bomb" on the plane while venting his anger out on the stewardess.

At the Byrneses' house, Pam shows her parents copies of Greg's MCAT transcript, which his parents faxed to her. As well, the CIA found no record of Greg because his legal name is Gaylord, not Gregory. Jack still believes that Greg is an unsuitable husband for Pam, but Dina lectures him about his consistent disapproval of any man whom Pam brings home. After hearing Pam make a heartfelt phone call to Greg, apologizing for not sticking up for him, Jack realizes that she truly loves him.

Jack rushes to the airport and convinces security to release Greg. The two make peace with each other, and Greg admits his fear of not living up to Jack's unattainable standards. After ensuring Greg's loyalty and devotion to Pam, Jack finally accepts him and asks him to be his son-in-law.

After returning to the Byrneses' home, Greg proposes to Pam while Jack and Dina listen from their bedroom, agreeing that they should now meet his parents. After Debbie's wedding, Jack views footage of Greg recorded by hidden cameras that he had placed around the house, but when Greg finds one of the cameras, he vents his frustrations with Jack.

== Cast ==
- Robert De Niro as Jack Byrnes, a retired CIA agent and a Vietnam War veteran who is overprotective of his family, slightly paranoid, and takes an instant dislike toward Greg
- Ben Stiller as Gaylord "Greg" Focker, a nurse and Pam's boyfriend, who seeks to impress her parents
- Blythe Danner as Dina Byrnes, Jack's wife and Pam's mother
- Teri Polo as Pam Byrnes, a 2nd-grade teacher who is Greg's girlfriend and Jack and Dina's older daughter
- James Rebhorn as Larry Banks, a plastic surgeon who is Bob's father and a close friend of Jack's
- Jon Abrahams as Denny Byrnes, brother of Pam and Debbie, and Jack and Dina's youngest son
- Owen Wilson as Kevin Rawley, the wealthy stock investor/carpenter ex-fiancé of Pam
- Phyllis George as Linda Banks, Larry's wife and Bob's mother
- Kali Rocha as Flight Attendant
- Thomas McCarthy as Bob Banks, Larry and Linda's son, a doctor and Debbie's fiancé
- Nicole DeHuff as Debbie Byrnes, the younger sister of Pam, Jack and Dina's younger daughter and Bob's fiancée
- Mark Hammer as Patient in the Hospital

== Themes ==
"But I was trying to have in a kind of forties-farce way, the opportunity to create realistic characters, but heighten the comedic situations and predicaments a bit so that they're still very funny and there is still some very broad humor, but you would connect to the characters and completely identify with Ben Stiller's anxiety about not only meeting Robert De Niro's character and all, but the kind of characters from his past that come with him."

— Jay Roach

Greg Focker is a middle-class Jewish nurse whose social and cultural position is juxtaposed against the Byrnes family of upper-middle class White Anglo-Saxon Protestants. With respect to Greg as a Jew and a nurse when compared to the Byrnes and Banks families, a distinct cultural gap is created and subsequently widened. The cultural differences are often highlighted, and Greg repeatedly made aware of them. This serves to achieve comedic effect through character development, and has also been commented on as being indicative of thematic portrayal of Jewish characters' roles in modern film, as well as being a prime example of how male nurses are portrayed in media. Speaking about character development in Meet the Parents, director Jay Roach stated that he wanted an opportunity to "do character-driven comedy" and "to create realistic characters, but heighten the comedic situations and predicaments".

Vincent Brook of the UCLA School of Theater, Film and Television observes mainstream Hollywood cinema's tendency since the 1990s of incorporating Jewish liminality and "popularizing the Jew". He explains the "manly Jewish triumph" of characters like Jeff Goldblum's David Levinson in Independence Day and labels it as a "certain answer to America's yearnings for a new Jewish hero". This stands in direct contrast to the schlemiel or "the Jewish fool", which was seen to have been revitalized in the mid-1990s after faltering since the 1960s. The schlemiel, Brook explains, is an anti-hero in whose humiliation the audience finds supreme pleasure. Within that context, Brook describes Greg Focker's character as "the quintessential example of the postmodern schlemiel". The repeated embarrassing encounters that Greg faces with his girlfriend's all-American family is compared to the example of Jason Biggs's character Jim Levenstein of the American Pie film series, in which Levenstein is often the comedic centerpiece due to his repeated sexual embarrassments.

At the insistence of his Christian host, the Jewish Greg agrees to say a prayer to bless the food at the dinner table. Unskilled at this custom, he improvises and recites a part of Godspell. This scene served to show a wide social and cultural gap between Greg and the Christian Byrnes family.

Anne Bower wrote about Jewish characters at mealtime as part of the broader movement that she believed started in the 1960s, when filmmakers started producing work that explores the "Jewish self-definition". She postulated that the dinner table becomes an arena where Jewish characters are often and most pointedly put into "conflicts with their ethnic and sexual selves". She described the example of Greg sitting down for dinner with the Byrnes family and being asked to bless the food. In this scene, Greg attempts to recite a prayer by improvising and, in doing so, launches into a recital of the song "Day by Day" from Act I of Godspell. Bower noted this scene as "particularly important for establishing the cultural distance" between the Jewish Greg and the Christian Byrneses. She noted that the social gap is further widened the next morning when Greg is the last person to arrive at the breakfast table; he shows up wearing pajamas while everyone else is fully clothed. Here, Greg is shown eating a bagel, which Bower argued as being a clear signifier of Jewishness.

Based on common misconceptions and stereotypes about men in nursing, Greg's profession is repeatedly brought up by Jack in a negative context, and the character of Greg Focker has come to be one of the best known film portrayals of a male nurse. Although men dominated the profession in earlier times, there has been a feminization of the nursing profession over the course of the last century that has often caused men in nursing to be portrayed as misfits by the media. A common stereotype is that of a man who accepts a career in nursing as an unfortunate secondary career choice, either failing to become a physician or still trying to become one. Such stereotyping is due to a presumption that a man would prefer to be a physician but is unable to become one due to lack of intelligence or non-masculine attributes. Jack is often seen openly criticizing Greg's career choice per his perception of nursing being an effeminate profession. In their book Men in Nursing: History, Challenges, and Opportunities, authors Chad O'Lynn and Russell Tranbarger present this as an example of a negative portrayal. Commenting on the same issue but disagreeing, Barbara Cherry, in her book Contemporary Nursing: Issues, Trends, & Management, called the portrayal of Greg as a nurse "one of the most positive film portrayals of men who are nurses", and commented that Greg "humorously addresses and rises above the worst of all stereotypes that are endured by men in this profession". Sandy and Harry Summers, in the book Saving Lives: Why the Media's Portrayal of Nurses Puts Us All at Risk, postulate that Greg's character, although intelligent and firm in his defense of his profession, "might have done more to rebut the stereotypes", and also report that "some men in nursing" expressed their opinions that it would have been better not to present the stereotypes at all.

== Production ==
=== Background ===
The film is a remake of a 1992 independent film Meet the Parents. Greg Glienna and Mary Ruth Clarke wrote the original story and screenplay. Glienna also directed and starred in the 72-minute film, which was filmed on 16 mm film in 1991 and released to the general public the following year. The 1992 film also marks one of only several film roles played by comedian Emo Philips that he also helped produce. Film producer Elliot Grove, founder of Raindance Film Festival and the British Independent Film Awards, listed the original Meet the Parents on his personal Top Ten list of favorite films where he called it "much funnier and tighter than the Hollywood version". The 1992 film was a featured entry in the 1995 Raindance Film Festival.

Producer Nancy Tenenbaum acquired the rights to the 1992 film. After she sent a copy of the original film to several people of interest, filmmaker Steven Soderbergh replied that he was interested, and that he wanted to direct a remake. He brought it to the attention of Universal Studios, which initially declined but subsequently optioned the rights to the film in 1995. Soderbergh took on the project, but dropped it when he got involved with Out of Sight.

=== Writing ===
"...I think the film is fantastic, and I can't imagine a screenwriter being any happier with a film unless he directs it himself. Which, in this case, would've been a disaster since Jay is a brilliant director..."

— Jim Herzfeld

In 1995, Universal Pictures purchased the rights to the film. Glienna and Clarke were contacted by Soderbergh to rewrite their script for mainstream audiences. After a couple of early drafts, parts of which were included in the final film, the pair received only a story credit.

Universal approached screenwriter Jim Herzfeld to expand the screenplay. Herzfeld expanded the modest script, completing the first draft as early as 1996. He initially presented it to Roach, who had, up to that point, directed the first two Austin Powers films. Roach admitted to having liked the script from the beginning and was very much willing to make the film, although he thought that "it needed more work". Universal initially declined to have relatively inexperienced Roach take on the project. The studio was skeptical of Roach's ability to direct a "less-cartoony, character-driven script" compared to a comedy like Austin Powers.

Universal's reluctance to give the project to Roach was also due to new interest from Steven Spielberg, who wanted to direct and produce the film with Jim Carrey playing the role of Greg Focker. However, Spielberg and Carrey never took the project past the planning stages. The script was returned to Roach, who, by this time, had taken on his next project of Mystery, Alaska, but he was still interested in making Meet the Parents.

The drafts of the script were written by Herzfeld and, after De Niro and Stiller were confirmed as stars, John Hamburg was hired "to help fit the script to their verbal styles". Due to changes in directorial and acting line-ups after the early drafts of the script were written, Hamburg kept adjusting and re-writing the script well after production had already begun.

=== Casting ===
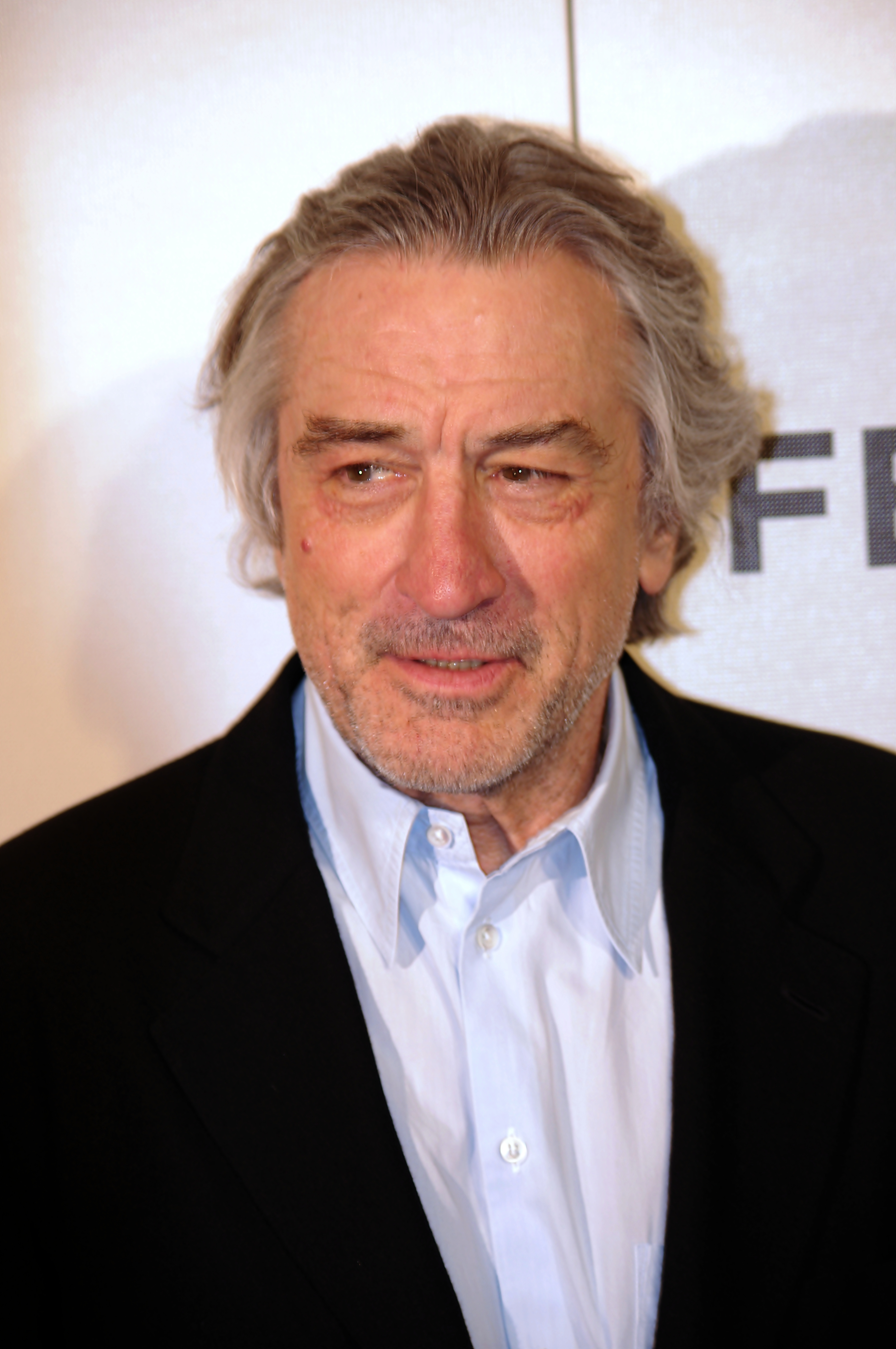
Robert De Niro was cast upon the suggestion of Universal Studios due to critical acclaim of his recent comedy work.

On the suggestion of Universal Studios, Roach cast De Niro in the role of Jack Byrnes due to critical acclaim of his recent comedy work in films such as Analyze This and the live-action/animated film The Adventures of Rocky and Bullwinkle. His character is Pam's father and a retired CIA operative who is overly protective of his family and has a hard time warming up to his daughters' love interests. The script was not written with De Niro in mind as Jack Byrnes; the first draft of the script was completed in 1996, three years before De Niro appeared in Analyze This. However, shortly after De Niro finished filming The Adventures of Rocky and Bullwinkle, Universal suggested to Roach that he should cast him for the role, to which Roach agreed that he had "no reservations whatsoever".

In an interview with Entertainment Weekly, De Niro stated that he was in active pursuit of comedic roles since Analyze This. Admitting that he had initial reservations about starring in the film, he said that he felt "pushed into it" due to insistence by Jane Rosenthal—De Niro's partner in Tribeca Productions who also acted as one of the producers. Herzfeld and Roach both confirmed that, after committing to the project and reviewing the script, De Niro was actually the person who came up with the idea for the famous polygraph test scene. Asked about working with him given the serious nature of his previous roles, Ben Stiller said that "it was a little bit intimidating working with De Niro", but that he "has a great sense of humor and I think that's the biggest surprise about him".

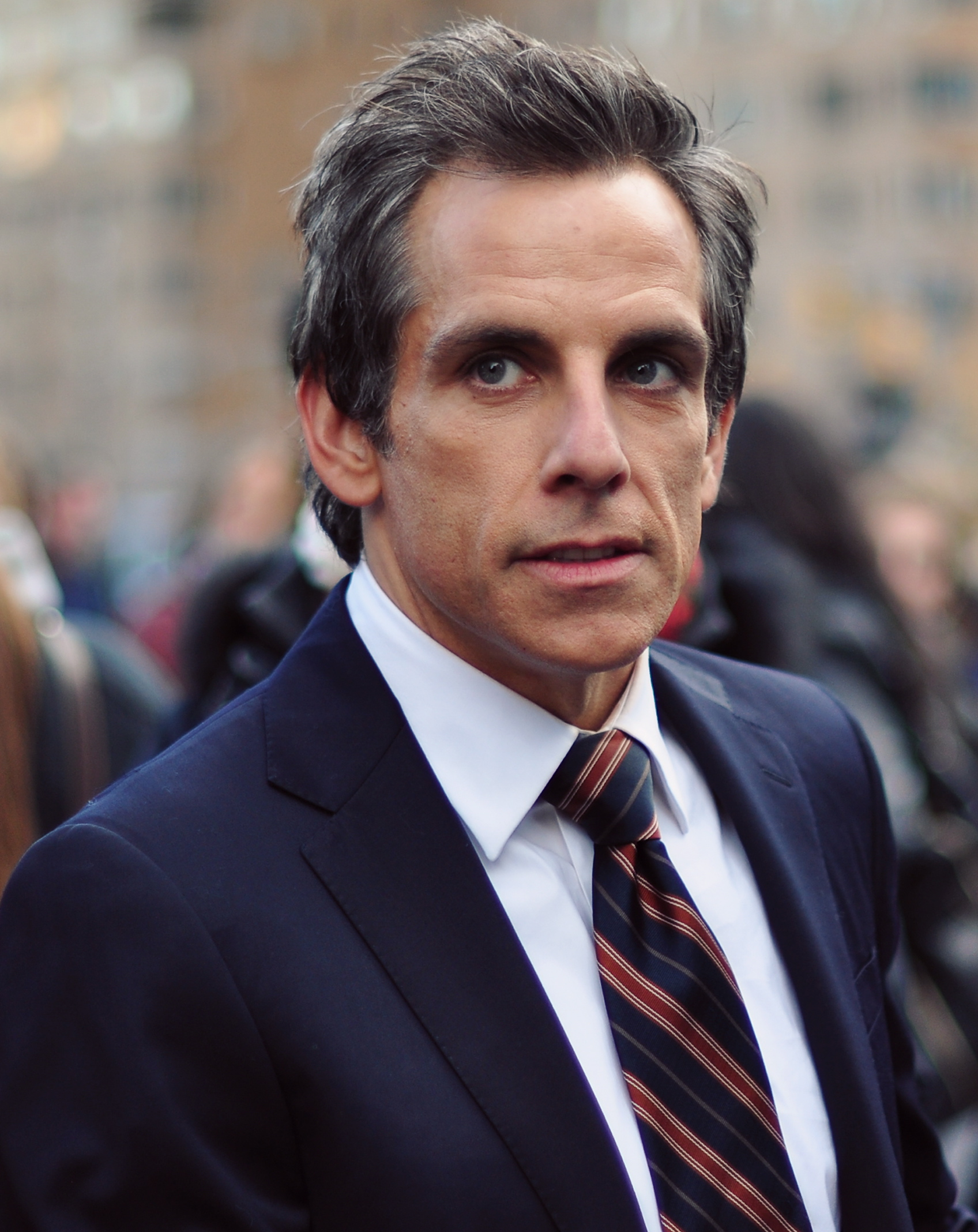
Ben Stiller was cast partly because the director was impressed with his improvisational abilities.

Explaining how Ben Stiller came to be cast in the role of Greg, Roach stated, "I saw Meet the Parents as an anxiety dream, and in my view nobody plays that kind of material better than Ben." Additionally, Roach was impressed with Stiller's creative and ad lib abilities, stating that "he has lots of great ideas and he's very skilled at loose improvisation". His character is a nurse who loves his girlfriend and desperately tries to impress her parents by any means, including telling harmless little lies that are subsequently covered up with bigger lies and elaborate cover-up schemes.

The film's script was initially written with Jim Carrey in the role of Greg and contained much more physical comedy, something that Stiller did not think would be successful with him playing the role. This resulted in the deletion of some scenes, but also in the introduction of at least one unscripted scene that was completely improvised by Stiller. Roach cast Stiller only after it became clear that Carrey would not be taking the role.

The consideration to play the character of Pam Byrnes, Greg's girlfriend who acts as a mediator between Greg and the Byrnes family, especially her father Jack, was initially given to British actress Naomi Watts. She ultimately lost the role to Teri Polo because the filmmakers "didn't think [Watts] was sexy enough".

Other characters in the film were played by Blythe Danner (as Dina Byrnes, Jack's wife and Pam's mother), Owen Wilson (as Kevin Rawley, Pam's ex-fiancé), Nicole DeHuff (as Debbie Byrnes, Pam's sister), Jon Abrahams (as Denny Byrnes, the youngest child of Jack and Dina Byrnes), Thomas McCarthy (as Bob Banks, Debbie's fiancé) and James Rebhorn (as Larry Banks, Bob Banks's father and a close friend of Jack's). Phyllis George, who is a former Miss Texas and Miss America pageant winner, and has appeared on numerous television programs as both a guest and a host, made her acting debut as Linda Banks, Larry's wife and Bob's mother.

The role of Jinx the cat was played by two five-year-old Himalayan cats named Bailey and Misha (sometimes written as Meesha), although according to trainer Dawn Barkan, "about 85%" of Jinx's scenes were done by Misha. The American Humane Association oversaw the filming of all scenes in which the cats were used and ensured the animals' obedience and well-being by keeping two trainers and a veterinarian on set at all times.

== Rating ==
Greg Glienna did not come up with the surname Focker; Greg's character in the original film did not have a last name. The name was written into the script after Jim Carrey came up with the idea for the Focker surname during a creative session held before he abandoned the project. Once Meet the Parents was submitted for rating evaluation, the Motion Picture Association of America (MPAA) questioned the surname Focker as possibly an expletive and, due to the repetitiveness of the surname throughout the film, it was in danger of being rated R according to the Motion Picture Association of America film rating system. The filmmakers were asked if they had made up the name or if they can prove that such a name exists. The studio submitted to the MPAA a list of real people with the surname Focker, which ensured that the film retained a PG-13 rating.

== Release ==
=== Theatrical run ===
Meet the Parents had its theatrical release in the United States and Canada on October 6, 2000. Distributed domestically by Universal Studios, it had an advertising budget of $33.9 million. It quickly proved to be a financial success, taking in $28.6 million during its opening weekend and averaging $10,950 per theater in a total of 2,614 theaters. It finished as the top-grossing film for the weekend of October 6–8, beating the second-placed Remember the Titans by a margin of more than $9 million and bringing in more than four times the gross of Get Carter, the next highest-grossing film released that weekend. Its opening-weekend gross was the highest for any film ever released in the month of October, surpassing Antz, as well as marking the highest opening weekend gross for a film starring Robert De Niro and Ben Stiller, beating out Analyze This and The Cable Guy, respectively. The film's October opening weekend record would be surpassed by Red Dragon in 2002.

Its gross for the second week of release dropped by 26% to $21.1 million, which kept it at number one at the US box office, beating Remember the Titans by a margin of more than $8 million. By the end of the second week of release, it had grossed more than $58 million, surpassing its production budget of $55 million. It spent its first four weeks of theatrical release as the highest-grossing film at the US box office, making it the first film to accomplish the feat since The Sixth Sense in 1999. This was also one of two films in 2000 to top the box office for four weekends; the other being another Universal film, How the Grinch Stole Christmas. It was displaced from number one during the November 3–5 weekend by the newly released Charlie's Angels, but ahead of The Legend of Bagger Vance, another new release that debuted at number three. It remained in the top 10 grossing films until its eleventh week.

The film started its international release, distributed by United International Pictures (UIP), on December 8, 2000, in Austria, Germany, Sweden and Switzerland. In Germany, it was the number-one film in its opening weekend with a four-day gross of $2.5 million from 356 screens. Its opening weekend screen average of $7,064 was the third-highest of 2000 in the country, behind Mission: Impossible 2 and American Pie. In the United Kingdom, it was released a week later on December 15, 2000. There, it made $3.3 million in its opening weekend, beating out How the Grinch Stole Christmas and The 6th Day to rank number one. It fell into second place once that film reclaimed number one, but made $1.5 million. The film continued to maintain number two behind Unbreakable in its third and fourth weekends respectively. In its fifth weekend, the film was ranked third behind the latter film and Cast Away with $1.4 million. In total, it managed to earn more than $21 million during its run. In Australia, it was released on December 26, 2000, and grossed more than $11 million during the theatrical run. Meet the Parents grossed $166.2 million in the United States and Canada, and a total of $330.4 million worldwide, making it the seventh-highest-grossing film of the year in the United States and Canada and worldwide.

=== Home media ===
Meet the Parents was released on VHS and DVD on March 6, 2001, by Universal Studios Home Video. The DVD sales for it were successful, taking in more than $200 million for 2001. Billboard magazine listed it as having the highest video sales for all weeks from March 31 up to and including April 21, being the top-selling DVD for the weeks of March 24 and March 31, and being the top-rented video for the weeks of April 7 and April 14. Within its first week of release, it made $4.3 million in DVD rentals, beating the previous record held by What Lies Beneath. Earning $21.4 million, the film had the second-highest first week home-video rentals at the time, after The Sixth Sense.

The DVD release provides only the letterbox format of the film and is also 108 minutes in length. The aspect ratio is 1.85:1 with an accommodation for an enhanced 16:9 playback. English-language audio tracks available with the film are a 5.1 Dolby Digital and DTS, with the primary difference being slightly louder low frequencies on one of the tracks. A French-language audio track is also available, although in only 5.1 Dolby Digital Format. English language subtitles are provided as well.

The single-disc "Collector's Edition" contains two audio commentaries, one a light-hearted and humorous discussion between Roach, Stiller, De Niro and producer Jane Rosenthal, and the other a more formal technical commentary on the filmmaking aspects by the director and editor Jon Poll. The director discusses issues that include working with the cast, using the best camera angles for comedic effect, discussing scenes that were improvised and scenes that were scripted, and commenting on issues surrounding shooting on location. The editor speaks about putting together the best functioning comedy from material that was filmed, and discusses some deleted scenes that were excluded from the DVD release.

In addition, the DVD features a twelve-minute outtake section, three minutes of deleted scenes, and Universal's Spotlight on Location featurette. Spotlight on Location is a standard 24-minute-long featurette about the making of the film that includes interviews with the cast members and contains behind-the-scenes footage. It also contains two games called Take the Lie Detector Test and The Forecaster Game, as well as PC material such as wallpapers and screensavers. There are also trailers for The Mummy Returns and Captain Corelli's Mandolin.

The region 2 edition of the DVD was released on October 22, 2001. A region 1 "Bonus Edition" was released on December 14, 2004, in both widescreen (1.85:1) and fullscreen (1.33:1) formats. Both editions contain three additional featurettes: Silly Cat Tricks, The Truth About Lying and a 12-minute-long Jay Roach: A Director's Profile.

A new 4K UHD Blu-ray edition of Meet the Parents was released on August 12, 2025.

=== Rights ===
In February 2006, Viacom (now known as Paramount Skydance) acquired the international rights to Meet the Parents, along with the rights to all 58 other live-action films DreamWorks had released since 1997, following their $1.6 billion acquisition of the company's live-action assets. The film's domestic rights still currently belong with Universal. Starting with 2010's Little Fockers, films in the Meet the Parents franchise started being co-released by Universal and Paramount, as it was the first film released following Paramount's takeover of DreamWorks' live-action division.

Domestically, the film has been made available on NBCUniversal's streaming platform Peacock, while in international markets, it is streaming on Paramount+.

== Soundtrack ==
The original motion picture soundtrack album for the film was released on September 26, 2000, on the DreamWorks Records record label. The soundtrack features 14 original compositions by Randy Newman, as well as additional tracks by Bobby Womack, Lee Dorsey, and Dr. John, and a hidden bonus track. Newman's original song "A Fool in Love" was nominated for an Academy Award for Best Original Song—Newman's 14th Oscar nomination—at the 73rd Academy Awards, but it lost to Bob Dylan's "Things Have Changed" from Wonder Boys. For the same song, Newman won the 16th Annual ASCAP Film & Television Music Award in the Top Box Office Films category, and was nominated at the 5th Golden Satellite Awards in the Original Song category.

Dan Goldwasser, in his review of the soundtrack on Soundtrack.Net, gave credit to Newman and the soundtrack for doing "an excellent job keeping the humor level high".

== Reception ==
=== Critical reception ===
"Making a funny but not mean, smart but not smug, broad but not lazy ensemble comedy about contemporary people in a realistic setting is hard. For which Meet the Parents is to be commended — it's a bouncy, loose-limbed, families-do-the-darnedest-things sitcom that elicits ungrudging laughs without invoking water boys, pet detectives, or Klumps."

— Lisa Schwarzbaum

Meet the Parents received a generally positive response from film critics, being commended on the subtlety of its humor, as well as being named "the funniest" or "one of the funniest" films of the year by several critics. On the review aggregator website Rotten Tomatoes, 85% of 148 critics' reviews are positive, with an average rating of 7.0/10. The website's consensus reads: "Despite sometimes sitcom-like execution, Meet the Parents is a hilarious look at familial relationships that works mostly because the chemistry between its two leads is so effective." Metacritic, which uses a weighted average, assigned the film a score of 73 out of 100, based on 33 critics, indicating "generally favorable" reviews. Audiences polled by CinemaScore gave the film an average rating of "A−" on a scale of A+ to F.

Kenneth Turan, film critic for the Los Angeles Times, called it "the funniest film of the year so far, possibly the most amusing mainstream live-action comedy since There's Something About Mary".

Critic Joe Morgenstern of The Wall Street Journal stated that the film "does almost everything right with a story about everything going wrong", and that it "works up a major comic delirium on the theme of Murphy's Law", concluding that "Meet the Parents is the funniest movie of the year".

CNN's Paul Clinton proclaimed, "Meet the Parents is one of the best comedies of this—or any other—year." He called it "wonderfully funny" and expressed his hope that "the Academy will also recognize this wonderful movie, something it rarely does when it comes to comedies".

Time magazine's film critic Richard Schickel stated that it was "divinely invented and perfectly orchestrated". He complimented the screenplay by calling the screenwriters Jim Herzfeld and John Hamburg "a couple of skilled tool-and-die makers", as well as the cast because he believed that they "understand that palpable reality will always trump frenzied fantasy when it comes to getting laughs". Schickel concluded his review by proclaiming that Meet the Parents is a "superbly antic movie".

Todd McCarthy of Variety magazine called the film "flat-out hilarious", and Neil Smith of the BBC proclaimed that "there's not a weak scene in this super-funny picture" while awarding it a rating of five stars out of five.

Film critic Roger Ebert of the Chicago Sun-Times gave it three stars out of four, comparing it to Roach's previous work on the Austin Powers film series and offering his opinion that "[Meet the Parents] is funnier because it never tries too hard".

Critic Christopher Null of AMC's Filmcritic.com claimed that "Meet the Parents is one of the funniest comedies I've seen since Annie Hall".

Lisa Schwarzbaum of Entertainment Weekly called the script "unforced" and concluded that it "goes down like a flute of Champagne, leaving an aftertaste of giggles".

However, Internet film critic James Berardinelli, in spite of awarding it two-and-a-half stars out of four, gave the film a somewhat scathing review. On his website, Berardinelli wrote that "Meet the Parents is put together like a TV sit-com" in which Roach "strings together a series of hit-and-miss lowbrow gags with little care for whether any of the connecting material is coherent, interesting, or enjoyable (in most cases, it's none of those three)". He concluded that, "even with Stiller and De Niro, Meet the Parents is an encounter that can be postponed until it's available on video".

Jeff Vice of the Deseret News, another detractor of the film, proclaimed that Meet the Parents is "only erratically funny", and accused Roach of taking "the cheap way out with a series of unfunny jokes".

Critic Peter Bradshaw's review in The Guardian concluded, "It is somehow less than the sum of its parts. It strains to come to life, but never quite makes it."

After it was released on home media, DVD reviewer and Rolling Stone magazine contributor Douglas Pratt, in his book Doug Pratt's DVD: Movies, Television, Music, Art, Adult, and More!, stated that "perhaps in the crowded theater the film is hysterical, but in the quieter venue of home video, it just seems sadistic, and as the humor evaporates, the holes in the plot become clearer".

=== Accolades ===
Award	Category	Nominee(s)	Result
Academy Awards	Best Original Song	"A Fool in Love"; Music and Lyrics by Randy Newman	Nominated
American Comedy Awards	Funniest Motion Picture		Nominated
American Comedy Awards	Funniest Actor in a Motion Picture (Leading Role)	Robert De Niro	Nominated
American Comedy Awards	Funniest Actor in a Motion Picture (Leading Role)	Ben Stiller	Won
ASCAP Film and Television Music Awards	Top Box Office Films	Randy Newman	Won
Blockbuster Entertainment Awards	Favorite Actor – Comedy/Romance	Robert De Niro	Nominated
Blockbuster Entertainment Awards	Favorite Actor – Comedy/Romance	Ben Stiller	Nominated
Blockbuster Entertainment Awards	Favorite Supporting Actor – Comedy	Owen Wilson	Nominated
Blockbuster Entertainment Awards	Favorite Supporting Actress – Comedy	Blythe Danner	Nominated
Blockbuster Entertainment Awards	Favorite Female – Newcomer	Teri Polo	Nominated
Bogey Awards	Bogey Award		Won
Golden Globe Awards	Best Actor in a Motion Picture – Musical or Comedy	Robert De Niro	Nominated
Golden Screen Awards	Golden Screen		Won
Golden Trailer Awards	Best Comedy		Nominated
Las Vegas Film Critics Society Awards	Best Original Song	"Meet the Parents"; Music and Lyrics by Randy Newman	Nominated
MTV Movie Awards	Best Comedic Performance	Ben Stiller	Won
MTV Movie Awards	Best On-Screen Team	Robert De Niro and Ben Stiller	Nominated
MTV Movie Awards	Best Line	"Are You a Pothead, Focker?" – Robert De Niro	Won
People's Choice Awards	Favorite Comedy Motion Picture		Won
Satellite Awards	Best Original Song	"A Fool in Love"; Music and Lyrics by Randy Newman	Nominated
Teen Choice Awards	Choice Movie – Comedy		Nominated
Teen Choice Awards	Choice Movie – Actor	Ben Stiller	Nominated

=== Others ===
The film is recognized by American Film Institute in these lists:

- 2005: AFI's 100 Years ... 100 Movie Quotes:
  - Jack Byrnes: "I have nipples, Greg. Could you milk me?" – Nominated

During an appearance for Rotten Tomatoes to promote the film Fifty Shades of Black, actor Marlon Wayans cited the film as one of his five favorite films.

== Influence ==
The success of the film was initially responsible for a 2002 NBC reality television show titled Meet My Folks, in which a young woman's love interest, vying for her family's approval, is interrogated by the woman's overprotective father with the help of a lie detector machine. In September 2002, NBC also aired a situation comedy titled In-Laws. During the development of it, NBC called it "a Meet the Parents project", which prompted an investigation by Universal into whether NBC was infringing on Universal's copyright. Universal did not pursue any action against NBC, but neither show lasted more than one season. NBC and Universal would merge in 2004.

On July 18, 2005, a regularly scheduled American Airlines flight from Fort Lauderdale–Hollywood International Airport to San Juan, Puerto Rico, was diverted back to Fort Lauderdale shortly after takeoff due to a bomb threat. The pilot turned the plane around approximately 40 minutes into the flight after a flight attendant found a crumpled napkin that read, "Bomb, bomb, bomb...meet the parents", a clear reference to the scene in which Greg repeatedly shouts the word "bomb" while being detained by airport security. The plane was met by a bomb squad from the local sheriff's office, as well as the FBI, whose agents questioned its 176 passengers about the note.

== Sequels ==
Following the film's success, the sequel titled Meet the Fockers was released in 2004. Also directed by Jay Roach, with a screenplay by Jim Herzfeld and John Hamburg, it chronicles the events that take place when the Byrnes family meets Bernie and Roz Focker, Greg's parents, played by Dustin Hoffman and Barbra Streisand. The producers intended for them to be the opposite of the Byrneses' conservative, upper class, WASPy demeanor; to that effect, producer Jane Rosenthal explained that "Dustin Hoffman and Barbra Streisand were our dream team". The sequel proved to be another financial success, grossing $280 million domestically and $516 million worldwide, outperforming Meet the Parents by a large margin and finishing as the fourth-highest-grossing film of 2004. In February 2007, Universal Studios announced that it would be making a second sequel in the franchise, titled Little Fockers. It was to be directed by Roach, with the screenplay written by Larry Stuckey, Roach's former assistant. The sequel brings back De Niro, Stiller, Polo, Danner, Hoffman and Streisand. Roach was later replaced as director of the third film by Paul Weitz. Little Fockers was released in 2010, grossing $148.4 million domestically and $310.7 million worldwide. A fourth film in the series titled, Focker in Law is set to release on November 25, 2026.

== See also ==
- 2000 in film
- Cinema of the United States
- List of American films of 2000
