= Tribeca Enterprises =

Film production company

- Type: Private
- Industry: Motion pictures Entertainment
- Founded: 1989; 37 years ago in Tribeca, New York City, U.S.
- Founders: Robert De Niro; Jane Rosenthal
- Headquarters: New York City, U.S.
- Products: Film, TV films
- Divisions: Tribeca Film Festival
- Website: tribecafilm.com

Tribeca Enterprises (formerly Tribeca Productions) is an American film and television production company co-founded in 1989 by actor Robert De Niro and producer Jane Rosenthal in the lower Manhattan neighborhood of Tribeca, which is where the company got its name.

== History ==
The company was founded in 1989 at the beginning of a revival of interest in the film production community in filming in New York City. Before the 1990s, it made more economic sense for production companies to film urban scenes in cities, including Montreal, Toronto, and Vancouver in Canada. Since the founding of Tribeca Productions, other production facilities have moved into various neighborhoods in New York City, and filming there and in the streets has again become commonplace.

In 2003, De Niro, Rosenthal, and Craig Hatkoff moved the company, and changed the name into Tribeca Enterprises, which organizes the Tribeca Film Festival, Tribeca Film Festival International, Tribeca Cinemas, and Tribeca Films.

== Filmography ==
Year	Film	Notes
1989	We're No Angels	Producer (uncredited)
1991	Cape Fear	Producer (uncredited)
1992	Thunderheart	Producer
1992	Mistress	Producer
1993	TriBeCa	Executive producer
1993	The Night We Never Met	Producer (uncredited)
1993	A Bronx Tale	Producer
1994	Mary Shelley's Frankenstein	Associate producer
1995	Panther	Producer (uncredited)
1996	Faithful	Producer
1996	Marvin's Room	Producer
1997	Wag the Dog	Producer
1998	Witness to the Mob	Executive producer
1999	Entropy	Producer
1999	Flawless	Producer
2000	The Adventures of Rocky and Bullwinkle	Producer
2000	Meet the Parents	Producer
2000	Holiday Heart	Producer
2001	Prison Song	Producer
2002	About a Boy	Producer
2002	Analyze That	Producer
2004	Stage Beauty	Producer
2004	Meet the Fockers	Producer
2005	Rent	Producer
2006	The Good Shepherd	Producer
2008	What Just Happened	Producer
2009	Public Enemies	Executive producer (uncredited)
2010	Little Fockers	Producer
2010	20% Fiction	Executive producer
2010	36	Producer
2011	Warrior Queen	Producer
2011	The Undomestic Goddess	Executive producer
2012	NYC 22	Executive producer
2014	About a Boy	Executive producer
2017	The Wizard of Lies	Executive producer
2018	Quincy	Producer
2019	When They See Us	Executive producer
2019	The Irishman	Producer
2026	Top of the World	Producer
2026	Focker-in-Law	Producer
