= Greg Glienna =

American director and screenwriter (born 1963)

- Born: August 23, 1963 (age 63); Chicago, Illinois, United States
- Occupations: Director, producer, writer

Greg M. Glienna (born in Chicago, Illinois, August 23, 1963) is an American director and screenwriter best known as the creator of the original 1992 film Meet the Parents. Glienna also wrote A Guy Thing and wrote and directed Relative Strangers. He is also the co-author (with Mary Ruth Clarke) of the play Suffer the Long Night which had its Los Angeles premiere August 2008.

== Life and career ==
Glienna grew up in the Park Ridge suburb of Chicago and took an interest in filmmaking from an early age, often working alongside his childhood friend James Vincent, who later produced the original Meet the Parents. He attended Columbia College Chicago before dropping out to study improvisational comedy at The Second City while continuing to make short films.

Glienna conceived of the core idea for the original Meet the Parents after acting out a scene with a friend wherein he portrayed a man meeting his girlfriend's father. He turned it into a short film entitled The Vase, in which he plays a man who meets both of his girlfriend's parents and breaks their prized vase. Hoping to make this concept into a full-length feature, Glienna wrote the 80-page screenplay for Meet the Parents alongside Mary Ruth Clarke in one month, to the approval of comedian Emo Philips, who signed on as a producer, wrote the film's title theme, and cameoed as a video store employee.

== Filmography ==
=== Writer ===
- Focker-in-Law (2026) (characters)
- Slutvinka: With Love, from Russia! (2013)
- The Coin Machine (2012)
- Little Fockers (2010) (characters)
- The Elevator (2010)
- Relative Strangers (2006) (screenplay) (story)
- Meet the Fockers (2004) (characters)
- A Guy Thing (2003) (screenplay) (story)
- Meet the Parents (2000) (1992 screenplay) (story)
- Desperation Boulevard (1998)
- Meet the Parents (1992)

=== Director ===
- The Road Dog (2023)
- Slutvinka: With Love, from Russia! (2013)
- The Coin Machine (2012)
- The Elevator (2010)
- Relative Strangers (2006)
- Desperation Boulevard (1998)
- The Can Man (1992)
- Meet the Parents (1992)

=== Actor ===
- Slutvinka: With Love, from Russia! (2013)
- The Coin Machine (2012)
- The Elevator (2010)
- Desperation Boulevard (1998)
- Meet the Parents (1992)

=== Producer ===
- The Elevator (2010)
- Meet the Parents (2000) (associate)
