= Desperation Boulevard =

- Directed by: Greg Glienna
- Written by: Greg Glienna
- Produced by: Timothy E. Sabo; Judy Tenuta
- Starring: Judy Tenuta; Michael Lerner; Emo Philips; Dana Plato; Erin Moran
- Release date: 1998
- Country: United States
- Language: English

Desperation Boulevard is a 1998 American independent film written and directed by Greg Glienna.

== Plot ==
Joan, a former child actress, attempts to regain her lost popularity in Hollywood.

== Cast ==
- Judy Tenuta as Joan
  - Lauren Alexander as Young Joan
- Jim Bruce as Stalker
- Charlene Cher as Joan's Mother
- Wil Shriner as Ron Van Horne
- Emmy Collins as Homeless Pizza Thief
- Alex DeVorak as German Man
- Sean Dorgan as Abortion Protester
- Greg Glienna as Director at Audition
- Joey Gyondla as Pizza Delivery Guy
- Bill Jenkins as Coco the Clown (as William B. Jenkins Jr.)
- Ken Kleiber as Guy, The Waiter
- Amber J. Lawson as Mother in Park
- Michael Lerner as Mannie Green the Manager
- Leah Stanko Mangum as Fan
- Jeff McLaughlin as Fan with Book
- Lanko Miyazaki as News Anchor
- Dana Plato as Self
- Erin Moran as Self
- Ken Osmond as Self
- Burt Ward as Self
- "Weird Al" Yankovic as Self
- Emo Philips
- Paul Tuminaro as Sean Dorgan
