= Teri Polo =

American actress (born 1969)

- Polo in 2026
- Born: Theresa Elizabeth Polo; June 1, 1969 (age 57); Dover, Delaware, U.S.
- Occupation: Actress
- Years active: 1986–present
- Spouse: Anthony Moore (m. 1997; div. 2005)
- Partner: Jamie Wollam (2007–2012)
- Children: 2

Theresa Elizabeth Polo (born June 1, 1969) is an American actress. She starred as Pamela Martha Focker in the Meet the Parents franchise, Helen Santos in The West Wing, Christine Daaé in Phantom of the Opera (1990), and played the role of police officer Stef Adams Foster in the Freeform series The Fosters (2013–2018) and its spinoff Good Trouble (2019–2024).

== Early life ==
Theresa Elizabeth Polo was born on June 1, 1969, in Dover, Delaware, to Jane (née Gentry), a homemaker, and Vincent Polo, a stereo systems designer. She is of Italian, English, and German descent. She studied ballet for 13 years beginning at age six. By age 13, she was attending New York's School of American Ballet. After winning a modeling contest, she moved to New York City at age 17 to pursue an acting career.

== Career ==
Polo's acting debut, in 1987, was in the role of Kristin Larsen on the ABC daytime soap opera Loving. The following year, she earned a role in primetime on the short-lived CBS series TV 101. She also starred in the 1990 miniseries The Phantom of the Opera as Christine Daaé. In 1994, Polo became a regular cast member on the last season of Northern Exposure. She later played Detective Ash on the TV series Brimstone. She appeared in a recurring guest role in the sixth and seventh seasons of The West Wing playing the role of Helen Santos, the wife of Democratic presidential candidate Matt Santos (Jimmy Smits).

In 2000, Polo became well known for her role as Pam Byrnes in the comedy Meet the Parents, opposite Ben Stiller and Robert De Niro. The following year, she starred with John Travolta in the thriller Domestic Disturbance. In 2003, she starred in the sitcom I'm with Her. In 2004, she reprised her role as Pam in Meet the Fockers, the sequel to Meet the Parents. She was ranked No. 42 on the Maxim Hot 100 Women of 2002. In February 2005, Polo posed nude for Playboy magazine. She was also featured in InStyle. She also starred in the Lifetime Movie Network 2006 movie, Legacy of Fear. In 2007, she starred in a Hallmark Channel movie Love is a Four Letter Word. In 2009, she starred in the feature film 2:13 and the Hallmark Channel movie Expecting a Miracle with Jason Priestley and Cheech Marin. That same year she also starred in The Beacon.

She appeared in the 2009 television pilot for Washington Field, a show about the National Capitol Response Squad, a unit of the FBI composed of elite experts in different areas who travel around the world responding to events that concern American interests. In 2010, Polo reprised her role as Pam Focker in Little Fockers, the second sequel to Meet the Parents and Meet the Fockers. She also appeared in the 1980s-styled horror fantasy film, The Hole.

In 2013, Polo was cast in a lead role in the ABC Family series The Fosters. She played San Diego police officer Stef Adams Foster, opposite Sherri Saum, playing her wife Lena Adams Foster. Together they parented five biological, foster and adopted children and fostered more along the way.

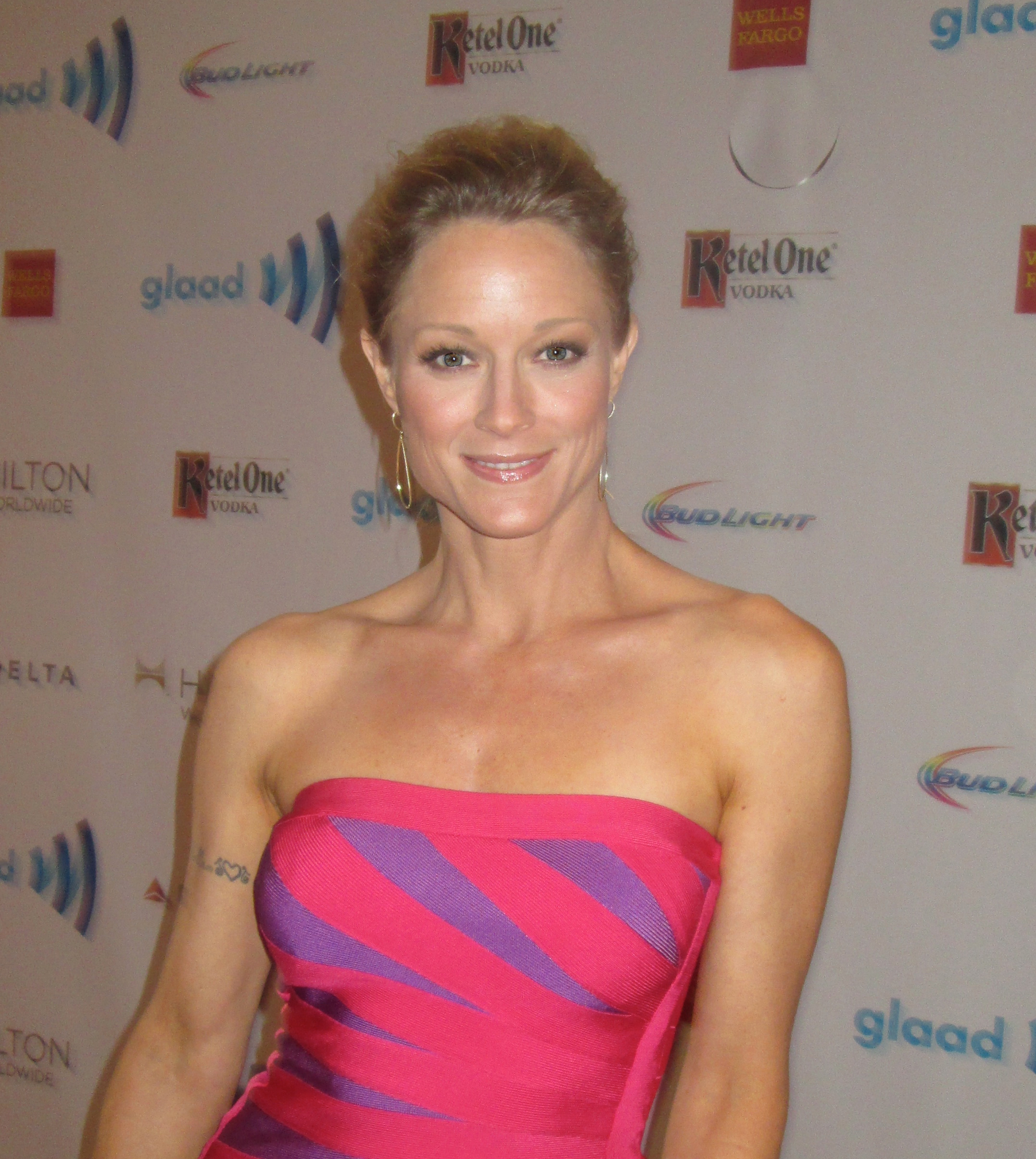
Polo at 2014 GLAAD Media Awards

In 2014, Polo starred in The Christmas Shepherd as the character Sally, an author living in a small town in Massachusetts who is devastated when her German Shepherd runs away during a storm.

In 2016, Polo narrated Daniel Errico's modern fairy tale short film "Rosaline". In 2019 she returned to animation (and LGBT-themed narratives) as Saylor the raven in Shabnam Rezaei's The Bravest Knight, the 13-episode Hulu animated series based on Errico's book.

After The Fosters ended its five-season run, Polo continued the role in guest appearances on the spinoff Good Trouble. In July 2020, the cast and producers of The Fosters united for a virtual table read of the pilot episode to benefit the Actors Fund, to help provide COVID-19 relief.

Polo has guest-starred on many TV shows, including The Practice, Felicity, Chicago Hope, Numb3rs, Sports Night, Frasier, Ghost Whisperer, Medium, Law & Order: LA, Castle and Criminal Minds.

Continuing to blend movies and television in her career, Polo took roles in JL Ranch and its sequel The Wedding Gift, All For Nikki, Deadly Switch, The Ravine, and Fourth Grade. Her return to television brought Polo full circle to her first love, dance, when she landed the role of former ballet dancer Julia in the Fox series The Big Leap, opposite Scott Foley and Piper Perabo.

== Personal life ==
In April 1997, Polo married photographer Anthony Moore. They have a son together. They divorced in 2003.

In 2006, while on the set of a music video, Polo met drummer Jamie Wollam, who is known for working with UK band Tears for Fears. They moved in together and welcomed a daughter in 2007. Polo and Wollam ended their relationship in 2012.

== Filmography ==
=== Film ===
Year	Title	Role	Notes
1991	Born to Ride	Beryl Ann Devers	
1991	Mystery Date	Geena Matthews	
1992	Passed Away	Rachel Scanlan	
1993	Aspen Extreme	Robin Hand	
1993	Quick	Quick	
1993	The House of the Spirits	Rosa del Valle	
1994	Golden Gate	Cynthia	
1996	The Arrival	Char	
2000	Meet the Parents	Pam Byrnes	
2001	The Unsaid	Barbara Lonigan	
2001	Domestic Disturbance	Susan	
2003	Straight From the Heart	Jordan Donovan	
2003	Beyond Borders	Charlotte Jordan	
2004	Meet the Fockers	Pam Byrnes-Focker	
2006	Legacy of Fear	Detective Jeanne Joyce	
2007	Full of It	Mrs. Moran	
2009	2:13	Amanda Richardson	
2009	The Hole	Susan	
2009	The Beacon	Bryn Shaw	
2010	Little Fockers	Pam Focker	
2012	Beyond	Sarah Noble	
2012	Christmas Angel	Melinda Mead	
2013	Final Recourse	Brooke Holton	
2013	The Last Session	Elizabeth Queen	Short film
2014	Authors Anonymous	Colette Mooney	
2014	A Bit of Bad Luck	Amanda	
2014	Mr Maple Leaf	Alex	Short film
2016	Outlaws and Angels	Ada Tildon	
2016	The Neighbor	Jaydn	Short
2020	All for Nikki	Liz Steadman	
2021	The Ravine	Carolyn Bianci	
2021	Fourth Grade	Kate	
2021	Four Cousins and a Christmas	Aunt Angela	
2026	Focker-in-Law †	Pam Focker	Post-production

Key
†	Denotes productions that have not yet been released

=== Television ===
Year	Title	Role	Notes
1986	Loving	Kristin Larsen	Daytime series
1988–1989	TV 101	Amanda Hampton	13 episodes
1990	The Phantom of the Opera	Christine Daaé	Movie
1990	People Like Us	Justine Altemus Slatkin	NBC movie
1994	Due South	Stephanie Cabot	Episode: "They Eat Horses, Don't They?"
1994	Tales from the Crypt	Sheila	Episode: "Revenge Is the Nuts"
1994–1995	Northern Exposure	Michelle Schodowski Capra	15 episodes
1995	Chicago Hope	Nurse Sarah Jane Petty	Episode: "Heartbreak"
1996	Full Circle	Tana Roberts	NBC movie
1997	Van Helsing Chronicles	Helena Harker	Movie
1997	A Prayer in the Dark	Janet Hayworth	Movie
1997	House of Frankenstein	Grace Dawkins	NBC miniseries
1998	Texarkana		Movie
1998	A Father for Brittany	Kim Lussier	CBS movie
1998	The Outer Limits	Sally McCoy	Episode: "Identity Crisis"
1998	The Marriage Fool (Love After Death)	Susan Prescot	CBS movie
1998–1999	Brimstone	Det. Sgt. Delilah Ash / Ashur Badaktu	6 episodes
1999	Sugar Hill		Series
1999	Felicity	Maggie Sherwood	5 episodes
1999–2000	Sports Night	Rebecca Wells	8 episodes
2000	Frasier	Abby Michaels	Episode: "Legal Tender Love and Care"
2002	Second String	Connie Heller	TNT movie
2003	Straight from the Heart	Jordan Donovan	Hallmark movie
2003	L.A. Dragnet	Jessie Ross	Episode: "All That Glitters"
2003	The Practice	Sarah Barker	5 episodes
2003–2004	I'm with Her	Alex Young	22 episodes
2005–2006	The West Wing	Helen Santos	18 episodes
2006	Welcome to the Jungle Gym		CBS movie
2006	For the Love of a Child	Yvonne	Lifetime Movies movie
2006	Legacy of Fear	Det. Jeanne 'JJ' Joyce	Lifetime movie
2007	Numb3rs	Rachel Willons	Episode: "Nine Wives"
2007	Love Is a Four Letter Word	Emily Bennett	Hallmark movie
2007	The Wedding Bells	Jane Bell	4 episodes
2008	Finnegan	Det. Erin Finnegan	ABC movie
2008	Law & Order: Special Victims Unit	Dana Kelley	Episode: "Confession"
2008	CSI: Miami	Jill Walsh	Episode: "Gone Baby Gone"
2009	Expecting a Miracle	Donna Stanhope	Hallmark movie
2009	Ghost Whisperer	Nikki	2 episodes
2009	The Storm	Danni Nelson	Episode: "The Storm: Part 1"
2009	Drop Dead Diva	Jillian Ford	Episode: "The Magic Bullet"
2009	Monk	Stephanie Briggs	Episode: "Mr. Monk Is the Best Man"
2009	Washington Field	SA Amanda Diaz	CBS movie
2010	Medium	Mary-Louise Graff	Episode: "It's a Wonderful Death"
2010	Glory Daze	Prof. Larsen	2 episodes
2010–2011	Law & Order: LA	Casey Winters	3 episodes
2011	Castle	Kayla Baron	Episode: "Pretty Dead"
2011	We Have Your Husband	Jayne Valseca	Movie
2011	Man Up!	Theresa Hayden Keen	10 episodes
2012	A Taste of Romance	Sara Westbrook	Hallmark movie
2012	Criminal Minds	Maggie Hallman	Episode: "I Love You, Tommy Brown"
2012	The Christmas Heart	Ann Norman	Hallmark movie
2012	Christmas Angel	Melinda Davis	Movie
2013–2018	The Fosters	Stef Adams Foster	Lead role
2014	Law & Order: Special Victims Unit	Cordelia Bauer	Episode: "American Disgrace"
2014	The Christmas Shepherd	Sally Brown	Hallmark movie
2015	Romantically Speaking	Penny	Movie
2015	Love, Again	Chloe Baker	Hallmark movie
2016	Rosaline		Narrator
2016	Royal Pains	Diana Underhill	2 episodes
2016	The $100,000 Pyramid	Herself (celebrity guest)	Episode: "Teri Polo vs. Zachary Levi"
2016	Living with Models	Alice Adams	2 episodes
2016	J.L. Family Ranch	Rebecca Landsburg	Hallmark movie
2016	Conviction	Penny Price	Episode: "Mother's Little Burden"
2018	Deadly Delusion	Dr. Leary	Lifetime movie aka The Lease
2019	Deadly Switch	Olivia	TV movie aka Foreign Exchange
2019	The Bravest Knight	Saylor	Supporting character, voice
2019	25 Words or Less	herself	Game show
2019–2024	Good Trouble	Stef Adams Foster	Guest role, 10 episodes
2020	Curb Your Enthusiasm	Rita	Episode: "Side Sitting"
2020	J.L. Family Ranch: The Wedding Gift	Rebecca Landsburg	Hallmark movie
2021	The Big Leap	Julia Perkins	Main role, 11 episodes
2022	NCIS	Vivian Kolchak	3 episodes
2024	FBI: International	Tess Chaplain	season 3 guest role, season 4
