= Meet the Fockers =

2004 film by Jay Roach

- Theatrical release poster
- Directed by: Jay Roach
- Screenplay by: Jim Herzfeld; John Hamburg; Jeff Baena (Note: uncredited)
- Story by: Jim Herzfeld; Marc Hyman
- Based on: Characters by: Greg Glienna; Mary Ruth Clarke
- Produced by: Jane Rosenthal; Robert De Niro; Jay Roach
- Starring: Robert De Niro; Ben Stiller; Dustin Hoffman; Barbra Streisand; Blythe Danner; Teri Polo
- Cinematography: John Schwartzman
- Edited by: Jon Poll; Lee Haxall
- Music by: Randy Newman
- Production companies: Universal Pictures; DreamWorks Pictures; Tribeca Productions; Everyman Pictures
- Distributed by: Universal Pictures (United States and Canada); DreamWorks Pictures (through United International Pictures; international)
- Release date: December 22, 2004
- Running time: 115 minutes
- Country: United States
- Language: English
- Budget: $80 million
- Box office: $522.7 million

Meet the Fockers is a 2004 American romantic comedy film directed by Jay Roach. It is the second in the Meet the Parents film series and the sequel to Meet the Parents (2000). It features Robert De Niro, Ben Stiller, Blythe Danner, and Teri Polo reprising their roles from the first film, with Dustin Hoffman and Barbra Streisand. The film sees Greg Focker and his fiancée Pam introduce their respective parents to each other, creating tension over their contrasting lifestyles.

Meet the Fockers was released on December 22, 2004, in the United States by Universal Pictures, with DreamWorks Pictures releasing in other territories. It received mixed reviews, and was a box-office success, grossing $522.7 million against an $80 million budget and becoming the seventh-highest-grossing film of 2004. A further sequel, Little Fockers, followed in 2010.

== Plot ==
After Greg proposed to his girlfriend Pam Byrnes and with their wedding date six months away, they decide to introduce their parents to each other. They fly to Oyster Bay, New York, to pick up Pam's father, retired CIA operative Jack Byrnes, her mother Dina, and her one-year-old nephew, Jack "Little Jack" Banks (the son of Bob and Debbie Banks). Jack drives the family in his new RV to Miami, Florida, to meet Greg's parents.

They are greeted by Greg's eccentric, fun-loving and free-spirited parents, Bernie Focker, a lawyer-turned-stay-at-home-dad, and Roz, a sex therapist for elderly couples. While Dina bonds with the Fockers, cracks form between Jack and the Fockers due to their contrasting personalities and backgrounds.

A chase between the Fockers' dog Moses and the Byrneses' cat Jinx culminates with Jinx flushing Moses down the RV's toilet. Bernie destroys the toilet to save Moses. Later, Bernie accidentally injures Jack's back during a game of touch football.

Pam informs Greg that she is pregnant, and they decide to keep it a secret until they are married. Bernie tells the guests that Greg lost his virginity to the Fockers' former housekeeper Isabel Villalobos 15 years earlier. Isabel's 15-year-old son Jorge, who has never met his father and bears a striking resemblance to Greg, catches Jack's attention after he repairs the toilet in the RV. Roz, Bernie and Dina learn that Pam is pregnant but promise not to tell Jack.

Greg is left alone to babysit Little Jack, whom Jack has been raising via the Ferber method. Despite Jack's strict instructions to leave him to self-soothe, Greg is unable to stand listening to Little Jack's cries and attempts to cheer him up by hugging him and acting humorously, but inadvertently teaches him the word "asshole".

When Greg answers a brief phone call from Roz, Little Jack is let out of the playpen by Jinx. He turns on the TV to Scarface and glues his hands to a bottle of rum while repeatedly saying "asshole". This leads to an argument between Jack and the Fockers about each other's parenting methods.

Jack begins spying on Greg, sending both Greg and Jorge's hair samples for a DNA test. He invites Jorge to Greg and Pam's engagement party hoping that Greg will admit that he is Jorge's father. When Greg denies having known about Jorge, Jack does not believe him, so he drugs him with a shot of truth serum. While giving a toast, Greg uncontrollably blurts out that Pam is pregnant and that Jorge is his son before losing consciousness.

The next morning, Pam questions Greg about Jorge, but he promises that he knew nothing about him before the previous evening. She believes him and is willing to work things out with him. Jack has reached his breaking point and demands that Pam and Dina leave with him. Dina refuses and reveals that Jack drugged Greg. Everyone turns against Jack and informs him that they were all aware of Pam's pregnancy but did not tell him due to his inability to trust people. Shocked and hurt, Jack leaves with his grandson.

Bernie and Greg pursue Jack but are tasered and arrested by Officer Vern LeFlore for speeding and not remaining in Bernie's car when pulled over. Meanwhile, Jack receives the results of the DNA test, revealing that Jorge's father is really a baseball player named Rusty Bridges, who also resembles Greg. Jack turns around to go back toward the house, but when he sees Bernie and Greg being arrested, he attempts to defend them, but LeFlore tasers and arrests him as well.

Greg, Jack and Bernie are released from jail by Judge Ira, a client of Roz's. Before they leave, Greg asks Jack and Bernie to stop their feud. Jack admits that he made a mistake regarding Jorge and explains his career in the CIA to Bernie before apologizing for his actions.

Greg and Pam are married that weekend by her former fiancé Kevin, now an ordained interfaith minister. Jack reviews hidden camera footage to find each of the Fockers jeopardizing the Ferber method.

== Cast ==
- Robert De Niro as Jack Byrnes
- Ben Stiller as Gaylord "Greg" Focker
- Dustin Hoffman as Bernie Focker
- Barbra Streisand as Roz Focker
- Blythe Danner as Dina Byrnes
- Teri Polo as Pam Byrnes-Focker
- Tim Blake Nelson as Officer Vern LeFlore
- Alanna Ubach as Isabel Villalobos
- Ray Santiago as Jorge Villalobos
- Kali Rocha as Flight Attendant
- Shelley Berman as Judge Ira Goldfarb
- Owen Wilson as Kevin Rawley
- Spencer Pickren and Bradley Pickren as Jack “Little Jack” Banks
- Cedric Yarbrough as Prison Guard

== Production ==
Twins Spencer and Bradley Pickren were cast as Little Jack. The twins' mother was a pediatric nurse who had taught them sign language from birth, although they had to learn a few additional signs specifically for the movie. As was common in the film industry, the casting of twins in a child role allowed the producers to work within the limitations on how many hours children are allowed to work, and swap in a fresh sibling if one of them unexpectedly became tired or upset. Although the Pickren twins performed exceptionally well on-set most of the time, they were never at ease with actor Ben Stiller after doing the head-butting sequence. Although the head-butt itself was a digitized effect, Stiller had to pretend to be hit by grabbing his face, cursing loudly and smearing fake blood under his nose, all of which was upsetting to the Pickrens.

As part of building the character Roz Focker, the crew consulted sex experts Jennifer and Laura Berman. The Bermans advised them of the difficulty that people in their profession face with not exposing their children to too much sexual knowledge too soon, an idea that was worked into the film.

== Reception ==
=== Critical response ===
Rotten Tomatoes reports that 38% of 164 sampled critics give Meet the Fockers positive reviews, with an average rating of 5.20/10. The site's consensus is: "Talented cast is wasted as the movie is content with recycling jokes from its predecessor, Meet the Parents." At Metacritic, which assigns a weighted average score out of 100, with reviews from mainstream critics, the film received an average score of 41, based on 34 reviews, indicating "mixed or average" reviews. Audiences polled by CinemaScore gave the film an average rating of "B+" on a scale of A+ to F.

Todd McCarthy of Variety explained that "the gap between the first and second installments isn't as gaping as with, for instance, Analyze This and Analyze That, but the laughs Fockers generates are the type you feel embarrassed about almost immediately afterward."

=== Box office ===
The film was a commercial success and is currently the second highest-grossing film starring Robert De Niro, behind Joker. The film grossed $46,120,980 in its opening weekend in North America (5,000 screens at 3,518 theaters, averaging $13,110 per theater, or $9,224 per screen). Overall, it grossed $70.5 million during its first five days of release. The film went on to break The Lord of the Rings: The Return of the King's records for both the highest Christmas Day gross and the biggest Tuesday gross, making a total of $19.1 million and $12.6 million, respectively.

The film would hold the Tuesday record until 2006, when The Omen surpassed it. Meet the Fockers continued to hold the Christmas Day record until it was beaten by both Avatar and Sherlock Holmes in 2009. It made $12.1 million on New Year's Eve and $18.3 million on New Year's Day, surpassing the previous records held by both Cast Away and The Lord of the Rings: The Return of the King simultaneously. By the end of the film's 149 days of release, it had grossed a total of $279,261,160 in North America and $243,396,776 in other territories, for a total worldwide gross of $522,657,936, with an estimated 44 million tickets sold in the U.S. The film's budget was $80 million.

== Awards and nominations ==
- 2005: Casting Society Of America, USA: Nominated for Best Feature Film Casting: Comedy.
- 2005: Teen Choice Awards: Nominated for Choice Movie: Blush, Choice Movie Actor: Comedy, Choice Movie Actor: Comedy, Choice Movie: Liar.
- 2005: MTV Movie Awards: Won for Best Comedic Performance. Nominated for Best International Movie.
- 2005: ASCAP Film and Television Music Awards: Won for Top Box Office Films.

== Sequel ==
A sequel to the film, titled Little Fockers, was released on December 22, 2010.
