= Jane Rosenthal =

American film producer (born 1956)

- Rosenthal in 2026
- Born: September 21, 1956 (age 70); Denver, Colorado, U.S.
- Occupation: Film producer
- Years active: 1992–present
- Spouse: Craig Hatkoff (m. 1995; div. 2014)
- Children: 2

Jane Rosenthal (born September 21, 1956) is an American film producer. She is co-founder, CEO, and executive chair of Tribeca Enterprises, a media company that encompasses Tribeca Productions, the Tribeca Film Festival, Tribeca Studios, and non-profit offshoot the Tribeca Film Institute. She and Robert De Niro founded the Tribeca Film Festival in the aftermath of the September 11 attacks to help revitalize downtown Manhattan.

She has been De Niro's producing partner since 1988, producing films including Wag the Dog (1997), Meet the Parents (2000), and The Good Shepherd (2006). In 2020, Rosenthal was nominated for the Academy Award for Best Picture for producing The Irishman (2019).

== Biography ==
In 1989, Rosenthal co-founded the Tribeca Productions film studio in the Lower Manhattan neighborhood of TriBeCa with actor Robert De Niro. Rosenthal and De Niro co-produced the dramatic television anthology series TriBeCa in 1993 and, in 2002, co-organized the first annual TriBeCa Film Festival.She is co-founder and co-chair of the board of the not-for-profit Tribeca Film Institute.

Rosenthal is a member of the Academy of Motion Pictures Arts and Sciences and has been honored by The Museum of the Moving Image, New York University Tisch School of Arts, The Matrix Award, and The National September 11 Memorial & Museum. In 2011, she was presented with the Jane Jacobs Medal for Lifetime Leadership from The Rockefeller Foundation and The Monteblanc de la Culture Arts Patronage Award for her commitment to arts and culture. Rosenthal serves on the boards of the National September 11 Memorial & Museum, The Child Mind Institute, Global Citizen, and interactive media company Eko.

== Personal life ==
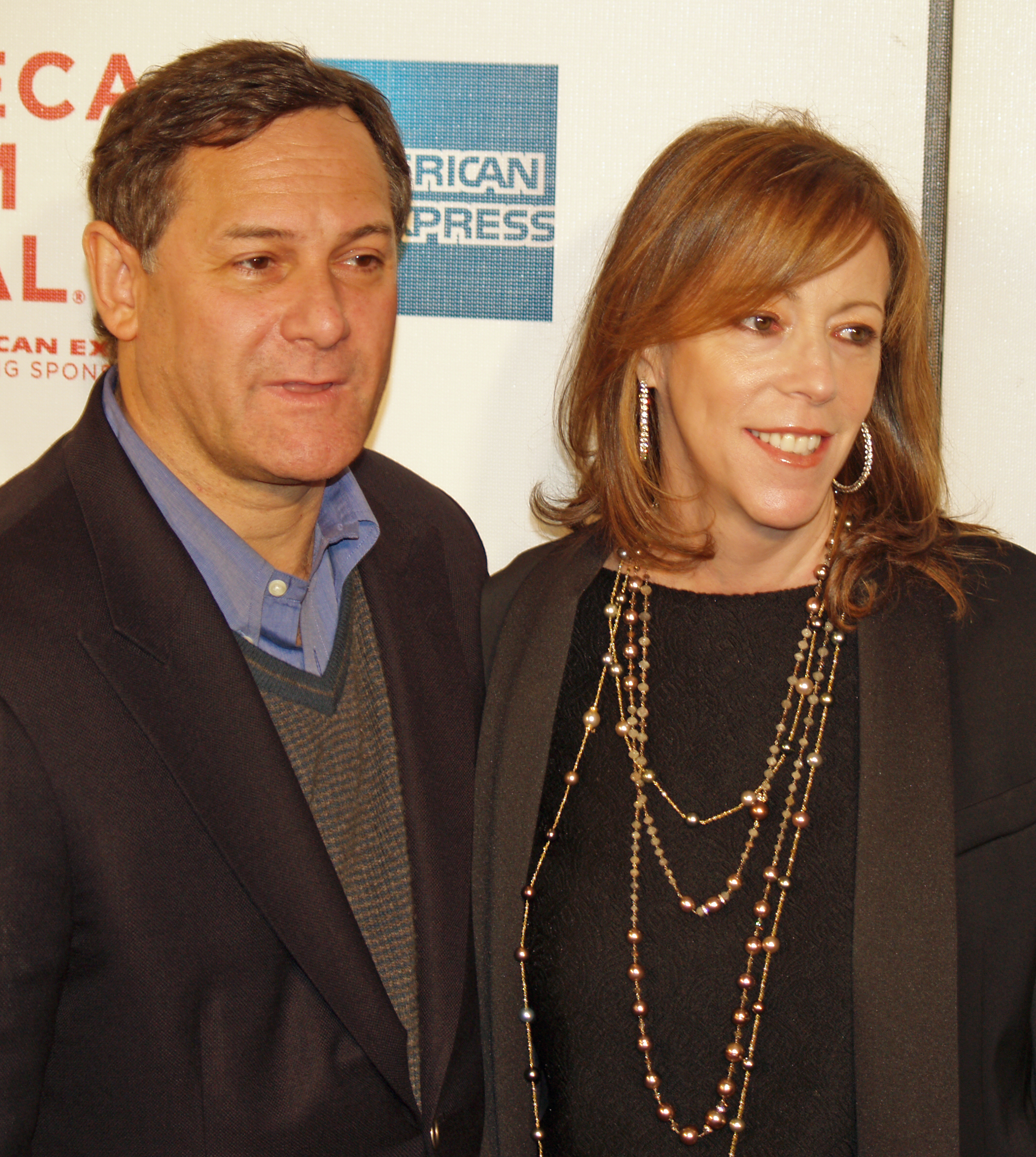
Hatkoff and Rosenthal at the 2008 Tribeca Film Festival

In 1995, Rosenthal married Craig Hatkoff. They raised their two children in the Jewish faith. The couple separated in 2014.

== Filmography ==
=== Producer ===
- Thunderheart (1992)
- Night and the City (1992)
- A Bronx Tale (1993)
- Faithful (1996)
- Marvin's Room (1996)
- Wag the Dog (1997)
- Analyze This (1999)
- Entropy (1999)
- Flawless (1999)
- The Adventures of Rocky and Bullwinkle (2000)
- Meet the Parents (2000)
- Prison Song (2001)
- Showtime (2002)
- About a Boy (2002)
- Analyze That (2002)
- House of D (2004)
- Stage Beauty (2004)
- Meet the Fockers (2004)
- Rent (2005)
- The Good Shepherd (2006)
- What Just Happened (2008)
- Little Fockers (2010)
- All We Had (2016)
- The Irishman (2019)
- The Good House (2021)
- The Wizard of Oz at Sphere (2025)
- Oh. What. Fun. (2025)
- Focker-in-Law (2026)

=== Executive producer ===
TV series

- TriBeCa (1993)
- The Repair Shop (1998) (TV pilot)
- About a Boy (2003) (TV pilot)
- NYC 22 (2012)
- About a Boy (2014)
- When They See Us (2019)

Documentary series

- Nine for IX (2013)
- Acting Disruptive (2013)
- Nine for IX Shorts (2013−14) (Documentary shorts)
- This Is a Robbery (2021)

TV movies

- Witness to the Mob (1998)
- Holiday Heart (2000)
- Porn 'n Chicken (2002)
- For Justice (2015)
- The Wizard of Lies (2017)

Feature films

- Cape Fear (1991) (Uncredited)
- Public Enemies (2009) (Uncredited)
- Being Flynn (2012)
- Grudge Match (2013)
- The Pirates of Somalia (2017)
- Bohemian Rhapsody (2018)
- The War with Grandpa (2020)
- Postcard from Earth (2023)
- TORN: The Israel–Palestine Poster War on NYC Streets (2025)

=== Special thanks ===
- Café Society (1995)
- Sign Gene (2017)
- Nigerian Prince (2018)
- Lucky Grandma (2019)
- Land of Gold (2022)
