= Jay Roach =

American filmmaker (born 1957)

- Roach in 2026
- Born: Mathew Jay Roach; June 14, 1957 (age 69); Albuquerque, New Mexico, U.S.
- Other name: M. Jay Roach
- Education: Stanford University (BA); University of Southern California (MFA)
- Occupation: Filmmaker
- Years active: 1986–present
- Notable work: Austin Powers; Mystery, Alaska; Meet the Parents; Dinner for Schmucks; The Campaign; Trumbo; Bombshell
- Spouse: Susanna Hoffs (m. 1993)
- Children: 2

Mathew "Jay" Roach (born June 14, 1957) is an American filmmaker. He is best known for directing movies, including the Austin Powers film series, Meet the Parents, Dinner for Schmucks, The Campaign, Trumbo, and Bombshell. He also produces films, including 2006's Borat.

Jay Roach earned critical acclaim for directing and producing the political television drama films Recount, Game Change, and All the Way, producing the films under his company Everyman Pictures. For his work, he has received four Emmy Awards, of his six nominations.

== Early life and education ==
Roach was born and raised in Albuquerque, New Mexico, U.S., where his father was a military worker. He graduated from Eldorado High School in 1975. He received a BA in economics from Stanford University in 1980 and later earned a Master of Fine Arts in film production from the University of Southern California in 1986. Roach worked for 10 years as a writing apprentice and sound editor. He also worked as an adjunct film professor at USC.

== Career ==
Roach's early entrance into film was in music videos. His first job was working as a cameraman on the music video for Eazy-E's "Eazy-er Said Than Dunn", which was directed by his film school friend John Lloyd Miller. Roach made his directorial debut with the 1990 comedy film Zoo Radio. He received recognition for the commercially successful spy comedy film Austin Powers: International Man of Mystery (1997), starring Mike Myers as the title character. He returned to direct the sequels Austin Powers: The Spy Who Shagged Me (1999) and Austin Powers in Goldmember (2002).

Roach also directed the sports comedy-drama film Mystery, Alaska, which was released in October 1999. He continued to direct critically and commercially successful comedies, including Meet the Parents (2000) and its sequel Meet the Fockers (2004), Dinner for Schmucks (2010), and The Campaign (2012). Roach expanded into other genres, directing the biographical period drama Trumbo (2015) and the biographical drama Bombshell (2019), which earned multiple Academy Award nominations.

Roach earned critical acclaim for directing multiple HBO political drama films. He directed Recount (2008), which earned him two Primetime Emmy Awards for Outstanding Directing for a Limited Series, Movie, or Dramatic Special and Outstanding Television Movie, in addition to the Directors Guild of America Award for Outstanding Directing – Miniseries or TV Film. He then directed Game Change, about the 2008 McCain/Palin campaign, which premiered March 2012 as one of the most watched films in HBO history. The film earned him additional Primetime Emmy Awards in the same categories as well as the Golden Globe Award for Best Miniseries or Television Film and a Peabody Award. He also directed All the Way, which premiered in May 2016 and earned Roach two more Primetime Emmy Award nominations in the same categories.

== Personal life ==
Roach is married to musician and actress Susanna Hoffs of The Bangles, with whom he has two sons. Roach was raised a Southern Baptist, and converted to Judaism before marrying Hoffs.

== Filmography ==
=== Film ===
Year	Title	Director	Producer
1990	Zoo Radio (Note: Credited as "M. Jay Roach")	Yes	No
1997	Austin Powers: International Man of Mystery	Yes	No
1999	Austin Powers: The Spy Who Shagged Me	Yes	No
1999	Mystery, Alaska	Yes	No
2000	Meet the Parents	Yes	Yes
2002	Austin Powers in Goldmember	Yes	No
2004	Meet the Fockers	Yes	Yes
2010	Dinner for Schmucks	Yes	Yes
2012	The Campaign	Yes	Yes
2015	Trumbo	Yes	Uncredited
2019	Bombshell	Yes	Yes
2025	The Roses	Yes	Yes

Producer only

- The Empty Mirror (1996)
- 50 First Dates (2004) (Executive producer)
- The Hitchhiker's Guide to the Galaxy (2005)
- Borat (2006)
- Charlie Bartlett (2007)
- Smother (2008)
- Brüno (2009)
- Little Fockers (2010)
- Sisters (2015)
- Mark Felt: The Man Who Brought Down the White House (2017)
- Focker-in-Law (2026)

Other credits

Year	Title	Role
1994	Blown Away (Note: Credited as "M. Jay Roach")	Writer and associate producer

=== Television ===
TV series

Year	Title	Director	Executive Producer	Notes
2004	American Candidate	No	Yes	10 episodes
2005	Earth to America	Yes	No	TV special
2015	The Brink	Yes	Yes	10 episodes
2023	High Desert	Yes	Yes	8 episodes

TV movies

Year	Title	Director	Executive Producer
2008	Recount	Yes	Yes
2012	Game Change	Yes	Yes
2016	All the Way	Yes	Yes
2020	Coastal Elites	Yes	Yes

Other credits

Year	Title	Producer	Writer	Notes
1993	Space Rangers	Yes	Yes	Episode: "Fort Hope"
1993	Lifepod	Co-producer	Yes	TV movie
1997	Poltergeist: The Legacy	No	Yes	Episode: "Fear"
2019	Barry	No	No	Appeared as himself; Episode: "The Audition"

== Awards and nominations ==
Year	Award	Category	Nominee(s)	Result	Ref.
2008	Primetime Emmy Award	Outstanding Television Movie	Recount	Won	
2008	Primetime Emmy Award	Outstanding Directing for a Limited Series, Movie, or Dramatic Special	Recount	Won	
2009	Directors Guild of America Award	Outstanding Directing – Miniseries or TV Film	Recount	Won	
2009	Golden Globe Award	Best Miniseries or Television Film	Recount	Nominated	
2009	Producers Guild of America Award	Best Long-Form Television	Recount	Nominated	
2012	Primetime Emmy Award	Outstanding Television Movie	Game Change	Won	
2012	Primetime Emmy Award	Outstanding Directing for a Limited Series, Movie, or Dramatic Special	Game Change	Won	
2012	Peabody Award	Director	Game Change	Won	
2013	Directors Guild of America Award	Outstanding Directing – Miniseries or TV Film	Game Change	Won	
2013	Golden Globe Award	Best Miniseries or Television Movie	Game Change	Won	
2013	Producers Guild of America Award	Best Long-Form Television	Game Change	Won	
2015	Windsor International Film Festival	LIUNA People's Choice Award	Trumbo	Won	
2016	Cinema for Peace Award	Most Valuable Film of the Year	Trumbo	Nominated	
2017	Kinema Junpo Award	Best Foreign Language Film	Trumbo	Nominated	
2016	Santa Fe International Film Festival	American Filmmaker Award		Won	
2016	Cinema Audio Society Award	Filmmaker Award		Won	
2016	Primetime Emmy Award	Outstanding Television Movie	All the Way	Nominated	
2016	Primetime Emmy Award	Outstanding Directing for a Limited Series, Movie, or Dramatic Special	All the Way	Nominated	
2017	Directors Guild of America Award	Outstanding Directing – Miniseries or TV Film	All the Way	Nominated	
2019	Heartland International Film Festival	Truly Moving Picture Award	Bombshell	Won	
2020	Cinema for Peace Award	Most Valuable Film of the Year	Bombshell	Nominated	

Directed Academy Award performances
Under Roach's direction, these actors have received Academy Award nominations for their performances in their respective roles.

Year	Performer	Film	Result
Academy Award for Best Actor
2015	Bryan Cranston	Trumbo	Nominated
Academy Award for Best Actress
2019	Charlize Theron	Bombshell	Nominated
Academy Award for Best Supporting Actress
2019	Margot Robbie	Bombshell	Nominated
