= Craig Hatkoff =

American real estate investor and philanthropist (born 1954)

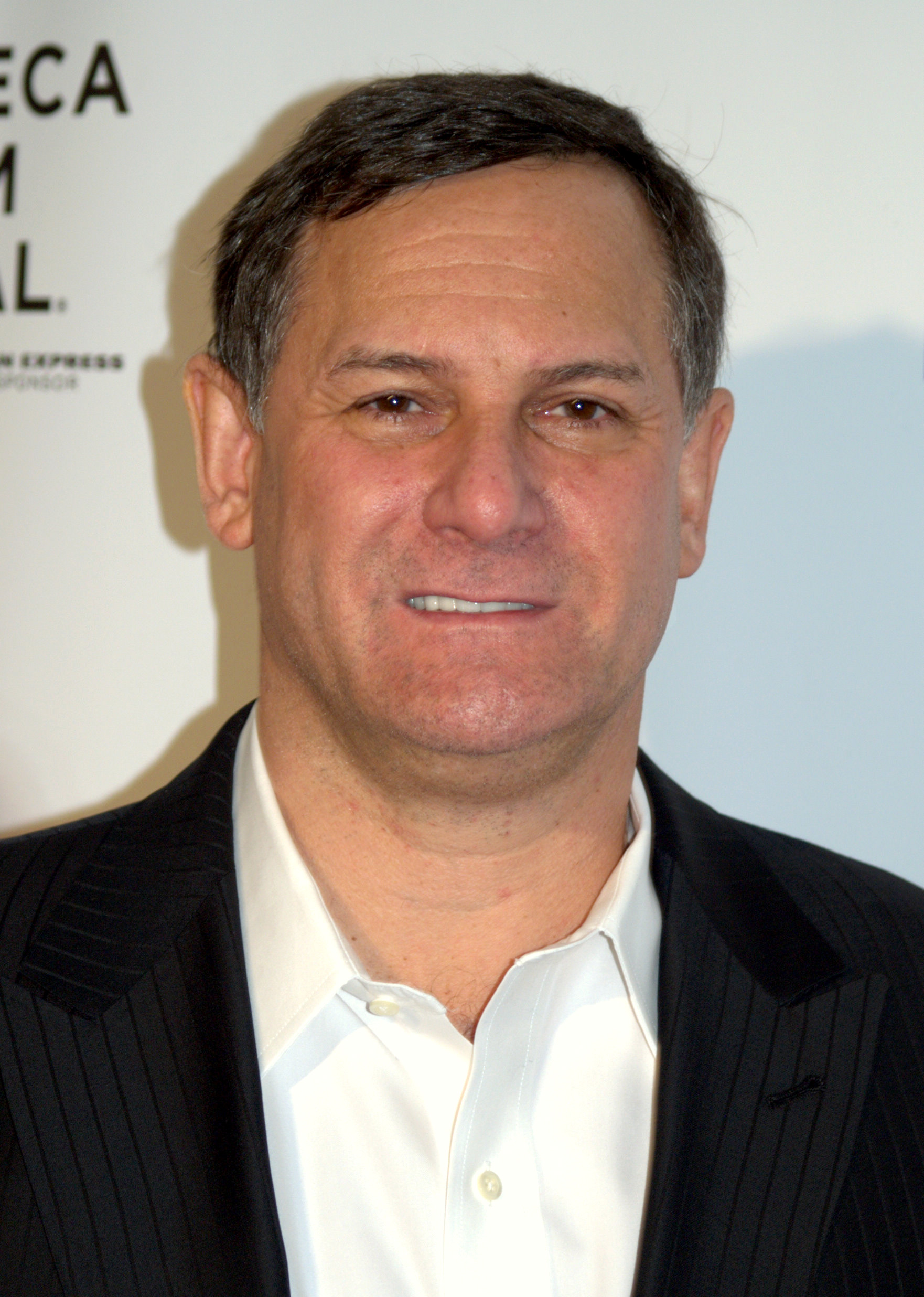
- Hatkoff in 2010
- Born: March 19, 1954 (age 72); New York, U.S.
- Education: The Albany Academy
- Alma mater: Colgate University; Columbia University.
- Spouse: Jane Rosenthal (m. 1994; div. 2014)
- Children: 2
- Relatives: Alan Patricof (brother-in-law)

Craig M. Hatkoff (born March 19, 1954) is an American real estate investor from New York City. Along with his now ex-wife Jane Rosenthal, and Robert De Niro, he co-founded the Tribeca Film Festival and the Tribeca Film Institute in 2002. The three were recipients of the inaugural September 11 National Museum and Memorial Foundation "Notes of Hope Award" for Distinction in Rebuilding in September 2008.

== Early life and education ==
Hatkoff was born to a Jewish family in upstate New York, the son of Doris (née Wildove) and Leon Hatkoff. He is a 1972 graduate of The Albany Academy, and graduated from Colgate University. He received an MBA from Columbia University. He has two sisters; his sister Susan is married to investor Alan Patricof.

== Career ==
Hatkoff wrote Owen & Mzee: The True Story Of A Remarkable Friendship which describes the friendship between a tortoise and an orphaned hippopotamus in Kenya after the 2004 Indian Ocean earthquake. Other works include Good-Bye, Tonsils (2001), Knut: How one little polar bear captivated the world (2007) about the polar bear cub Knut from the Berlin Zoo and "Looking for Miza" and "Cecil's Pride". "Looking for Miza" and "Cecil's Pride" both were written together with his two children. Winter's Tail, (Scholastic Books, 2007, ISBN 978-0-545-12335-8) is about the disabled dolphin Winter. The Hatkoff's series of children's books have won numerous prestigious awards including the American Book Association Book of the Year and the Christophers Award. Owen and Mzee has been published in 17 languages including Swahili, Braille, Arabic and Hebrew.

One of Turtle Pond Publications significant investments is Fillpoint LLC a videogame e-commerce direct-to-consumer distribution and fulfillment provider. In February 2009, Fillpoint acquired from the Handleman Company the much larger videogame distribution and publishing operations SVG Distribution and Crave Entertainment, that focus on in-store distribution platform.

== Tribeca Film Festival ==
In 2002, Jane Rosenthal, Robert De Niro and Craig Hatkoff founded the Tribeca Film Festival in a response to the September 11, 2001 attacks on the World Trade Center and the consequent loss of vitality in the TriBeCa neighborhood in Lower Manhattan. .

== Other endeavors ==
Hatkoff is Chairman of Turtle Pond Publications which owns or invests in a number of new media, entertainment and publishing ventures.

=== Board seats ===
Hatkoff is the co-founder of Capital Trust and was on the board of directors. Hatkoff is active as a board member of both public as well as non-profit boards. He is on three public company boards that include Colony Capital (NYSE: CLNY) and SL Green (NYSE: SLG), two of the country's largest REITs, as well as Subversive Capital Acquisition Corp, a SPAC that is expected to convert into a REIT during 2020 and trades on the Canadian NEO stock exchange. He was also a director of Taubman Centers Inc (TCO) from 2004- 2019 and was a co-founder of Capital Trust along with Samuel Zell, the legendary Chicago based billionaire investor, where he was vice chairman.

Hatkoff cofounded the Disruptor Foundation in 2009 along with the late Professor Clayton M. Christensen of the Harvard Business School. The foundation convenes and produces the annual Disruptor Awards that were launched in 2010 with over 250 honorees since its inception. The foundation also publishes the Off White Papers which has been published in Forbes magazine as well as Big Think.

He has been on the boards of other non-profits including Sesame Workshop, Rock and Roll Hall of Fame, Wildlife Direct, Borough of Manhattan Community College Foundation, the Child Mind Institute, the Tribeca Film Institute of which he was a co-founder, the Desmond Tutu Peace Foundation and the Mandela Institute for Humanity.

== Personal life ==
In 1995, Hatkoff married Jane Rosenthal; they have two children. In 2014, Rosenthal and Hatkoff announced their divorce after 19 years of marriage.
