= Mystery, Alaska =

1999 US comedy-drama film by Jay Roach

- Theatrical release poster
- Directed by: Jay Roach
- Written by: David E. Kelley; Sean O'Byrne
- Produced by: David E. Kelley
- Starring: Russell Crowe; Hank Azaria; Mary McCormack; Lolita Davidovich; Ron Eldard; Colm Meaney; Maury Chaykin; Burt Reynolds
- Cinematography: Peter Deming
- Edited by: Jon Poll
- Music by: Carter Burwell
- Production companies: Hollywood Pictures; Baldwin/Cohen Productions; Rocking Chair Productions
- Distributed by: Buena Vista Pictures Distribution
- Release date: October 1, 1999
- Running time: 119 minutes
- Country: United States
- Language: English
- Budget: $28 million
- Box office: $8.9 million

Mystery, Alaska is a 1999 American sports comedy-drama film, directed by Jay Roach, about an amateur ice hockey team from the fictional small town of Mystery that plays an exhibition game against the National Hockey League (NHL)'s New York Rangers. It stars Russell Crowe, Hank Azaria and Burt Reynolds, with Mary McCormack, Lolita Davidovich, Ron Eldard, Colm Meaney, Maury Chaykin, Scott Grimes and Kevin Durand in supporting roles. It was shot in Canmore, Alberta, mostly in what is today known as Quarry Lake Park.

Mystery, Alaska was released by Buena Vista Pictures Distribution on October 1, 1999. The film received mixed to negative reviews from critics and was a box office bomb, grossing $8.9 million against a $28 million budget.

== Plot ==
In Mystery, Alaska, "the Saturday Game", a weekly hockey game, is played on an open pond. The entire town turns out every week to watch. The latest edition of Sports Illustrated features an article which says that in the ability to skate, the Mystery team rivals any team in the National Hockey League (NHL).

Mayor Scott Pitcher tells one of the players, Sheriff John Biebe, that he is being dropped from the Game, in favor of teenager Stevie Weeks. Meanwhile, Connor Banks, the team's best player, gets into an argument with a representative checking out the town for Price World (a business chain embodying a threat to local business). Connor fires a shot to frighten him, but the bullet ricochets and hits the rep in the foot. Because of the article, the NHL suggested that the New York Rangers be brought up to Mystery to play the town's team in a televised exhibition game.

Pitcher wants John to coach: Judge Walter Burns, Birdie's father, has refused to do so. John says that he does not know how to coach.

Connor's arraignment is brought before Burns, and his attorney Bailey Pruitt accepts a trial date for the following week. Connor does not want a trial so soon because, if he loses, he will miss the upcoming game. Bailey tells him not to worry, because no jury will lock up the town's star player. At Connor's trial, Bailey asks the victim, Mr. Walsh, what he thinks of Mystery and asks him to confirm verbatim transcripts of his disparaging the town. The jury delivers a "not guilty" verdict. Amid much jubilation, Burns angrily addresses those assembled, saying that they have exalted the hockey game above what is right, disgracing themselves and his courtroom. Birdie confronts him in his chambers, feeling that Burns has always been ashamed of him for staying in town to play hockey, instead of going to college.

It emerges that the Rangers players are not keen to play the match, which they disparage as a joke. Crew from the TV network want to call the team the Mystery Eskimos, to which John and Pitcher take offense. John asks Burns to coach, to no avail.

The Rangers players file a grievance with their players' union, so they are no longer coming. Burns tells Bailey that there is a hearing in New York over the legal dispute. He says that it might be useful for Mystery to have a presence, and suggests legal arguments Bailey could use.

At the hearing, Bailey makes an impassioned plea for the game to continue. However, he suffers a fatal heart attack while arguing the case. Before dying, he wins the case, and the game is back on. John confronts Burns, saying that since he sent Bailey to New York, he now has to take over coaching. Burns agrees only if John comes back on the team as captain.

The Rangers players arrive and are greeted by the mayor and townsfolk. John must deal with Charlie Danner, the article's author and a native of Mystery, driving drunkenly on a Zamboni. They talk, and Charlie reveals his bitterness towards Mystery, which he believes has rejected him.

During the match, the Mystery team take time to settle, but eventually go ahead two goals to nothing in the first period. One of the goals is scored by Stevie. In the second period, the Rangers score five unanswered goals. Birdie costs the team a goal through his desire to "go it alone" when he should have passed. Unwilling to accept defeat, Mystery scores two goals in the third period, including one from a pass that Birdie makes instead of shooting for goal himself. As the clock ticks down, Connor has a chance to level the scores, but his shot hits the crossbar. The game is over, with the score 5 – 4 for the Rangers. Both the Mystery team and spectators appear deflated until Burns claps, after which even the Rangers players applaud them.

The following day the Rangers leave. Stevie and Connor fly out with them, having been given minor league contracts. Afterwards, John places the game puck on Bailey's grave.

== Cast ==
- Russell Crowe as Sheriff John Biebe
- Hank Azaria as Charles Danner
- Mary McCormack as Donna Biebe
- Lolita Davidovich as Mary Jane Pitcher
- Ron Eldard as Matt "Skank" Marden
- Colm Meaney as Mayor Scott R. Pitcher
- Maury Chaykin as Bailey Pruitt
- Michael McKean as Mr. Walsh
- Judith Ivey as Mrs. Joanne Burns
- Burt Reynolds as Judge Walter Burns
- Scott Grimes as Brian "Birdie" Burns
- Adam Beach as Galin Winetka
- Ryan Northcott as Stevie Weeks
- Kevin Durand as "Tree" Lane
- Brent Stait as Kevin Holt
- Megyn Price as Sarah Heinz
- Rachel Wilson as Marla Burns
- Beth Littleford as Janice Pettiboe
- Joshua Silberg as Michael Biebe
- Regan Sean O'Byrne Macelwain as Joey Biebe
- Michael Buie as Connor Banks
- Jason Gray-Stanford as Bobby Michan
- Leroy Peltier as Ben Winetka
- Shaun Johnston as District Attorney Doloff
- Cameron Bancroft as "Tinker" Connolly
- Terry David Mulligan as Dr. Henry Savage
- Mike Myers as Donnie Shulzhoffer
- Jim Fox as himself
- Phil Esposito as himself
- Little Richard as himself
- L. Scott Caldwell as Judge McGibbons
- Steve Levy as himself
- Barry Melrose as himself

== Production ==
In May 1997, it was reported Walt Disney Pictures had acquired David E. Kelley penned spec script The Game about a small Alaskan town whose ice hockey team that comes to unexpected attention when they suddenly find themselves playing a match against the New York Rangers and described as a mixture of Picket Fences and The Mighty Ducks. In August of that year, Jay Roach was announced as director for the film which was in the process of undergoing a name change to avoid confusion with The Game at PolyGram Films. In October, it was announced Russell Crowe was in talks to star in the film.

== Reception ==
Mystery, Alaska received mixed reviews. On the review aggregator website Rotten Tomatoes, 37% of 82 critics' reviews are positive. The website's consensus reads: "The lack of hockey action and authenticity left critics cold." Metacritic, which uses a weighted average, assigned the film a score of 49 out of 100, based on 29 critics, indicating "mixed or average" reviews. It had very poor take-ins as well, grossing only $8,891,623, against an estimated budget of $28 million.

== See also ==
- List of films about ice hockey
