= Prison Song (film) =

2001 film by Darnell Martin

- Prison Song DVD cover
- Directed by: Darnell Martin
- Written by: Q-Tip; Darnell Martin
- Produced by: Robert De Niro; Brad Epstein; Jane Rosenthal
- Starring: Q-Tip; Mary J. Blige; Harold Perrineau; Fat Joe; N.O.R.E.
- Cinematography: Alexander Gruszynski
- Edited by: Peter C. Frank
- Distributed by: New Line Cinema
- Release date: April 27, 2001
- Running time: 94 minutes
- Country: United States
- Language: English

Prison Song is a 2001 American film directed by Darnell Martin. A prison film, its plot concerns a boy brought up in group homes who has a gift and passion for art. It also marked the film debut of future Oscar-nominated Mary J. Blige as an actress.

== Plot ==
The film centers around 10-year-old intelligent Elijah Butler (Justin 'DJ' Spaulding) living in New York. His mother (Mary J. Blige) is a hard-working woman who has spent the last several years attending night school – with the eventual goal of becoming a lawyer. Given that she is from a lower-class area, she is having a tough time finding employment as a legal secretary. Her fiancé, Cee (Harold Perrineau), a photographer and supporter of the family, has a genuine bond with Elijah. Later, Cee is incarcerated after assaulting an officer who began harassing him on a street corner for taking pictures of passing pedestrians. He ends up serving twenty-five to life term for having three consecutive charges.

Later that night, Elijah and his best friend, Thomas Wilson (Dominique Walters), find themselves incarcerated at a juvenile correctional facility for playing a prank on a police officer with a laser pointer. When Elijah's mother comes to get him and is told he could not be released, Elijah is taken from her with both trying their best to get to one another. She assaults an officer by stabbing him with a pen and then is taken to a mental institution. The officer she assaulted tried to stop her when she tries to take Elijah out of the facility. Elijah has one visit with his mother, who is unaware of her surroundings due to obvious medication given from the facility. Elijah eventually is released from the juvenile facility and put in a foster home.

The film picks up years later, and Elijah (Q-Tip) is now a sensitive adult with dreams of becoming an artist with the support of his girlfriend Jolie (Denee Rivera). He is offered a spot at a prestigious art school under scholarship, but it gets taken away and is now unable to afford the tuition. Much to the chagrin of Cee who Elijah still sees through prison visits, Elijah considers a foray into the world of drug dealing. Though he eventually decides against that route, he winds up in jail for accidentally killing one of his foster brothers Big Pete (Fat Joe) by pushing him on to the subway tracks during an altercation. Elijah is then found guilty of second-degree murder and sentenced to fifteen years to life.

When he gets to jail, he is reunited with Thomas (Eric McCollum). Having a hard time adapting to prison life, Elijah takes an art class and paints works of art that impresses his fellow prisoners; however, due to funds, the art class is discontinued, much to his dismay. The prisoners are then subjected to hard labor on an abandoned building. Elijah then stages an uprising by setting fire to the building, which puts him in solitary confinement. Life for the prisoners gets worse when the officers take away the water, gym, physical education and classes, which sends Elijah to his breaking and he decides to break out.

Elijah concocts a plan to break out of prison and enlists the help of Thomas, his cellmate Harris (Danny Hoch), KT (Clay Da Raider), Brown (Bobbito Garcia), and Jay (Hassan Johnson), who works as an electrician in the jail. Before the group proceeds with the plan, Harris bails out at the last minute. The group uses a ladder to break through the window and press a button that opens the gate. As the group makes their way to a police car, Jay stabs Thomas multiple times in the back with a screwdriver as revenge. (Earlier in the film, Thomas stole toilet paper from Jay and he tried to stab Thomas, who turned the tables on him and slit his mouth and sent him to protective custody.) Elijah goes back to save Thomas, who ends up dying in his arms. As Elijah tries to leave, he ends up getting stuck in between a four-wall fence while holding an officer hostage and is then killed by a shotgun blast to the chest.

Sometime later, Elijah's artwork of people he drew during his time in prison ends up at an art gallery, with visitors looking at each one. The camera then zooms in on a painting of Elijah and Thomas as kids as the film ends.

== Cast ==
- Q-Tip - Elijah Dixon Butler
  - Justin "DJ JUS" Spaulding - young Elijah
- Mary J. Blige - Mrs. Rhoda Butler
- Harold Perrineau - Uncle Cee
- Lauren Velez - Prison counselor
- Denee Rivera - Jolie
- Eric McCollum - Thomas Wilson
  - Dominique Walters - young Thomas
- Fat Joe - Big Pete
- N.O.R.E. - Big Ski
- Brian A. Wilson - Prison C.O.
- Snow - Officer McIntyre
- Danny Hoch - Harris
- Mateo Gómez - Mr. Gonzalez
- Hassan Johnson - Jay
- Clay Da Raider - KT
- Bobbito Garcia - Brown

== Production ==
On the basis of his appearances on The Howard Stern Show, Insane Clown Posse member Joseph Bruce was offered a role as a bigoted prison guard. He was described by the producers as "a big white dude with urban slang to his voice." Bruce turned the role down because he did not want to play a racist.
