= Emo Philips =

American comedian and actor (born 1956)

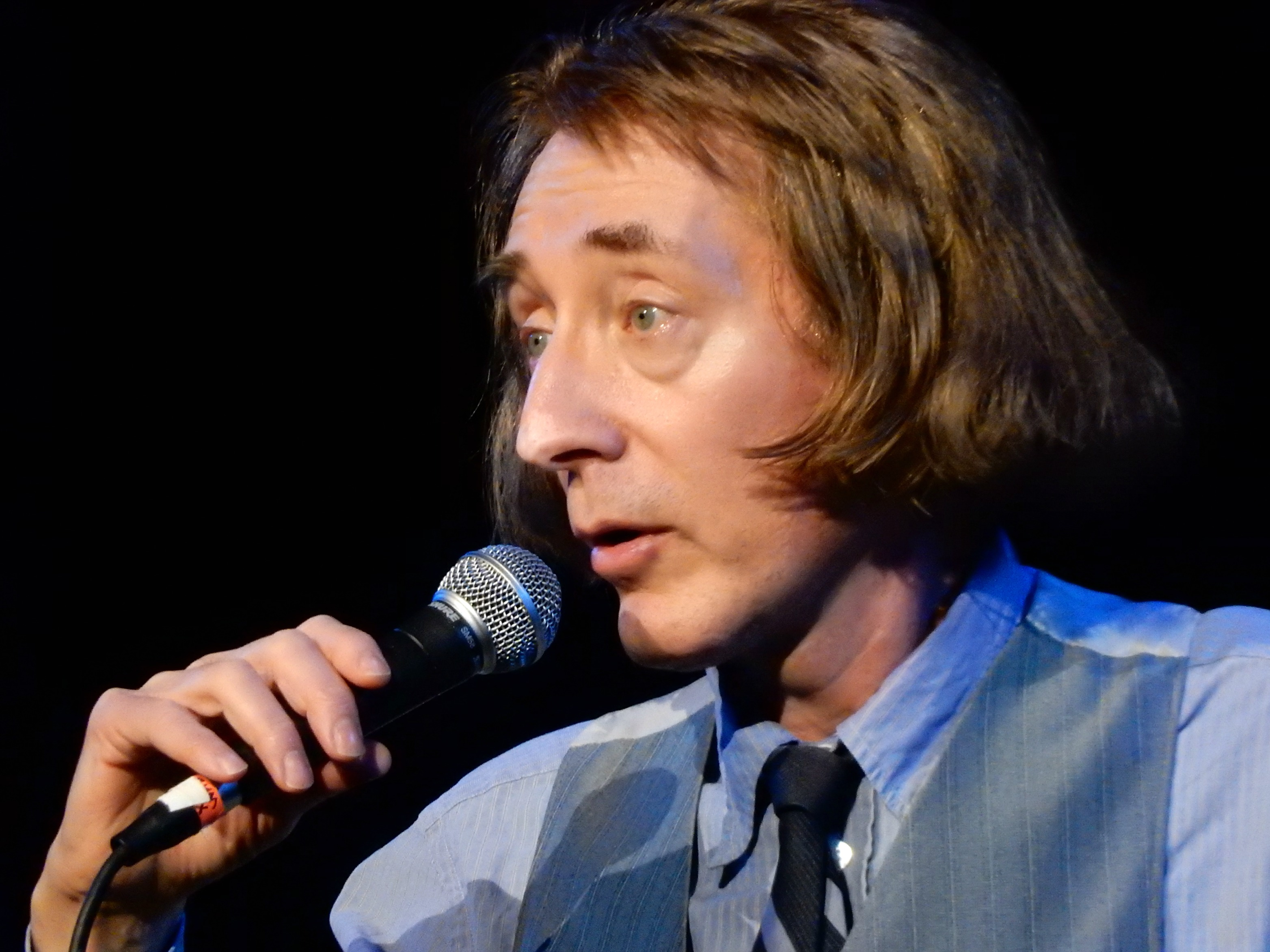
- Philips in 2018
- Born: February 7, 1956 (age 70); Chicago, Illinois, U.S.
- Occupations: Actor; stand-up comedian; producer; writer
- Years active: 1976–present
- Spouse: Kipleigh Brown (m. 2011)

Comedy career
- Medium: Stand-up
- Genres: Black comedy; Surreal humor; wit; word play
- Website: emophilips.com

Emo Philips (born Philip Soltanec, February 7, 1956) is an American stand-up comedian and actor. His stand-up comedy persona makes use of paraprosdokians spoken in a wandering falsetto tone of voice.

== Career ==
The character of Emo Philips appears as a fidgety, possibly mentally disturbed, nervous but highly intelligent individual. Philips constantly moves throughout the routine, often shifting from sitting to standing positions, wandering from end to end on stage, playing with his hair or clothing, or going as far as to partially undress as he delivers punchlines. His comedy, which is largely self-deprecating, is often delivered in a modulated falsetto. His look (occasionally described as geeky, disco and vaudeville-inspired), particularly his hair—a 1970s-style bob with straight-lined front fringe—has been a signature part of his appearance and act for most of his career.

Philips has recorded three comedy albums. His album E=mo², recorded live at Caroline's in Manhattan, New York City won the 1985 New Music Award for best comedy album. It was later re-released along with his Live at the Hasty Pudding Theatre album on a single CD. He also released an album called Emo in 2001. A joke of his was voted funniest religious joke ever in a 2005 online poll. In 2006, he appeared at the Newbury Comedy Festival. He was included in the top 50 of E4's 100 Greatest Comedians, and also appeared number 54 on Channel 4's top 100 greatest standups.

Aside from Philips's long career as a standup comic, he has been featured in acting roles on television series such as Miami Vice and The Weird Al Show. In 2006, he appeared on British television, as a guest on the panel game 8 Out of 10 Cats. Philips has several voiceover credits in animation, including the animated improv series Dr. Katz, Professional Therapist; improvised sitcom Home Movies; talk show parody Space Ghost Coast to Coast; scripted fantasy series Adventure Time as Cuber the mysterious storyteller; and the voice of Dooper in the animated series Slacker Cats. he has also appeared on four episodes of @midnight, in February 2015, April 8, 2016, a 1990s themed episode on September 26, 2016, and the finale episode on August 4, 2017.

He has appeared in feature films including 1989's UHF (as Joe Earley, a rather clumsy school shop teacher who accidentally saws his thumb off) and Desperation Boulevard in 1998. Additionally, he appeared in the original 1992 version of Meet the Parents (also executive producer) and was an associate producer of the 2000 remake.

Around 2001, Philips began to appear more often after a hiatus in the 1990s.

"Weird Al" Yankovic and Philips toured together throughout the US in 2018, in Yankovic's the Ridiculously Self-Indulgent, Ill-Advised Vanity Tour, and again in the 2022 iteration.

== Personal life ==
On November 5, 2011, Emo married actress and screenwriter Kipleigh Brown.

== Discography ==
- 1985: E=mo²
- 1987: Live at the Hasty Pudding Theatre
- 2001: Emo
- 2003: E=mo² plus the Entire Live at the Hasty Pudding Theatre

== Filmography ==
Key
†	Denotes films that have not yet been released

=== Film ===
Emo Philips' film credits
Year	Title	Role	Notes
1988	Journey to the Center of the Earth	Nimrod	Film debut role
1989	UHF	Joe Earley	
1992	Meet the Parents	Video Store Employee	Also executive producer and writer of title theme song
1992	The Can Man	The Can Man	Short film
1995	The Fan	—N/a	Screenwriter; direct-to-video
1998	Desperation Boulevard	—N/a	
2000	Meet the Parents	—N/a	Associate producer
2005	The Aristocrats	Himself	Documentary
2006	Relative Strangers	Guest at Hoedown	
2008	The Seventh Python	Himself	Documentary
2014	Rise of the Kitchen Appliances	Blender	Voice role; short film
2015	American Dirtbags	Gundealer's Brother-in-Law	
2017	Dying Laughing	Himself	Documentary
2020	Phineas and Ferb the Movie: Candace Against the Universe	Meeks Servant	Voice role
2022	Weird: The Al Yankovic Story	Salvador Dalí	
TBA	Stalking Emo †	Himself	Post-Production
TBA	Under the Smogberry Trees †	Himself	Post-Production

=== Television ===
Emo Philips' television credits
Year	Title	Role	Notes
1984—89	Late Night with David Letterman	Himself	Episode: "Dated 25 September 1984"
1985	Miami Vice	Rat Race Contestant	Episode: "Phil the Shill"
1986	The Bob Monkhouse Show	Himself	Episode: "#3.6"
1987	Emo Philips Live! at the Hasty Pudding Theatre	Himself	Television special
1987	Stand-Up America	Himself	1 episode
1987	The Max Headroom Show	Himself	Episode: "#1.5"
1987	The Secret Policeman's Third Ball	Himself	Television special
1987	Showtime at the Apollo	Himself	Episode: "#1.7"
1988	Saturday Live	Himself	Episode: "#3.5"
1988	Howard Stern's Negligeé and Underpants Party	Himself	Television film
1988	2nd Annual American Comedy Awards	Himself	Television special
1989	The Hippodrome Show	Himself	Episode: "#1.5"
1989—90	The Arsenio Hall Show	Himself	Episode: "9 February 1990"
1990	The Lowdown	Himself	Episode: "Making People Laugh"
1990	Emo Philips: Comedian and Mammal	Himself	Television special
1991	Molson Canadian Comedy Releaf	Himself	Television special
1991	Amnesty International's Big 30	Himself	Television special
1995—96	Dr. Katz, Professional Therapist	Emo	Voice; 2 episodes
1997	The Weird Al Show	Dr. Philips / The Slawmeister	2 episodes
1998	Space Ghost Coast to Coast	Himself	Episode: "Curses"
1999	Behind the Music	Himself	Episode: "Weird Al Yankovic"
1999—2004	Home Movies	Shannon	Voice; 3 episodes
2001	Late Show with David Letterman	Himself	Episode: "October 5, 2001"
2002	Late Friday	Himself	Episode: "#2.12"
2004	The World Stands Up	Himself	Episode: "#1.2"
2004—05	Late Night with Conan O'Brien	Himself	2 episodes
2005	Just for Laughs	Himself	2 episodes
2006	8 Out of 10 Cats	Himself	Episode: "#3.7"
2007	Scott Bateman Presents	Himself	Episode: "One"
2007	100 Greatest Stand-Ups	Himself	Television special
2007—09	Slacker Cats	Dooper	Voice; 10 episodes
2010	Iron Core Talk	Himself	1 episode
2012—16	Adventure Time	Cuber / Flour Demon	Voice; 6 episodes
2014	Review	Georgie	Episode: "Revenge; Getting Rich; Aching"
2014	TripTank	Karl	Voice
2016	Funny as Hell	Himself	Episode: "#6.6"
2016—17	@midnight	Himself	3 episodes
2017	Ben and Holly's Little Kingdom	—N/a	Writer; episode: "Welcome to Ben's Palace"
2017	SXSW Comedy with Natasha Leggero: Part 2	Himself	Television special
2017—19	Welcome to the Wayne	Dennis O'Bannon	Voice; 6 episodes
2018	Hunky Boys Go Ding-Dong	Cecil	Television film
2019	Le Lineup du Bordel	Himself	2 episodes
2019	Crashing	Himself	Episode: "The Viewing Party"
2019	Vendors	Len	Television film

=== Video games ===
Emo Philips' video game credits
Year	Title	Role	Notes
2015	Adventure Time: Finn & Jake Investigations	Cuber	Voice role

=== Music videos ===
Emo Philips' music video credits
Year	Song	Artist	Notes
1999	"It's All About the Pentiums"	'Weird Al' Yankovic	Directed by 'Weird Al' Yankovic
