= Jim Herzfeld =

American screenwriter and producer

- Herzfeld in 2026
- Born: James Herzfeld; United States
- Occupations: Screenwriter, television producer

Jim Herzfeld is an American film and television screenwriter who has also done work as a television producer. Herzfeld graduated from UCLA School of Theater, Film and Television (TFT) in 1984. Herzfeld's earliest TV credit is on It's Garry Shandling's Show in 1986, followed by almost 10 years of writing and producing on sitcom staffs, including Married... with Children. Herzfeld's earliest feature film work was a writing credit on the cult-comedy Tapeheads in 1988. Herzfeld's most successful work was writing the screenplay for the 2000 film Meet the Parents as well as writing the story and screenplay for its 2004 sequel Meet the Fockers. Herzfeld was also the writer of the canceled Circle 7 Animation version of Toy Story 3.

In 1985, Herzfeld appeared as a contestant on the game show Sale of the Century, winning $3,428 in cash and prizes.
