= Little Fockers =

2010 American film by Paul Weitz

- Theatrical release Poster
- Directed by: Paul Weitz
- Written by: John Hamburg; Larry Stuckey
- Based on: Characters by: Greg Glienna; Mary Ruth Clarke
- Produced by: Jane Rosenthal; Robert De Niro; Jay Roach; John Hamburg
- Starring: Robert De Niro; Ben Stiller; Owen Wilson; Blythe Danner; Teri Polo; Jessica Alba; Laura Dern; Harvey Keitel; Dustin Hoffman; Barbra Streisand
- Cinematography: Remi Adefarasin
- Edited by: Greg Hayden; Leslie Jones; Myron Kerstein
- Music by: Stephen Trask
- Production companies: Universal Pictures; Paramount Pictures; Relativity Media; Tribeca Productions; Everyman Pictures; Nancy Tenenbaum Films
- Distributed by: Universal Pictures (United States and Canada); Paramount Pictures (International)
- Release date: December 22, 2010 (United States)
- Running time: 98 minutes
- Country: United States
- Language: English
- Budget: $100 million
- Box office: $310.7 million

Little Fockers (known as Meet the Parents: Little Fockers in some markets) is a 2010 American comedy film directed by Paul Weitz. It is the sequel to Meet the Fockers (2004) and the third installment in Meet the Parents film series. Robert De Niro, Ben Stiller, Owen Wilson, Blythe Danner, Teri Polo, Dustin Hoffman, and Barbra Streisand reprise their roles from previous films, with Jessica Alba, Laura Dern, and Harvey Keitel joining the cast. The story follows Greg Focker who, after being named the succeeding family patriarch by his father-in-law Jack Byrnes, aims to prove his worth.

After the commercial success of the first two films, De Niro and Stiller each received a remuneration of $20 million for their roles in Little Fockers, which had a $100 million production budget. Little Fockers was released on December 22, 2010 by Universal Pictures in the United States and Canada, and by Paramount Pictures in international markets, and grossed $310.7 million on a $100 million budget. It received negative reviews from critics. A further sequel, Focker-in-Law, will be released on November 25, 2026.

== Plot ==
Five years after their wedding, Greg Focker and his wife Pam are preparing to celebrate the fifth birthday of their twin children Samantha and Henry, while planning to move to a new house. However, things go awry for Greg when his in-laws Jack and Dina Byrnes visit them, and Jack announces that he is looking for his successor as the head of the Byrnes family.

Recently, Jack has been diagnosed with a heart condition and has become embittered by his daughter Debbie's divorce from her husband Bob. As Jack's original plan to declare Bob as his successor has failed, and his son Denny is a disappointment to him, he decides to pass the role to Greg, naming him "The Godfocker".

Despite Greg reluctantly accepting the role, Jack remains skeptical and begins to suspect Greg of infidelity when he sees him with drug representative Andi Garcia, who openly flirts with him. The presence of Sustengo, an erectile dysfunction drug that Greg promotes as a side job, also prompts Jack to think that he is no longer sexually attracted to Pam. Furthermore, he starts to doubt his ability to provide for his family when he is initially reluctant to enroll his children in a private school.

During a medical conference promoting Sustengo, Greg meets Bob at a bar and he tells him of Jack's original intention to name him "The Bobfather" as his successor. His relief and happiness with leaving Jack's family makes Greg slightly uncomfortable. Meanwhile, Jack tries to convince Pam to consider divorcing Greg and renewing her relationship with her ex-fiancé Kevin Rawley, whom Jack thinks is more financially and personally suitable for her.

Eventually, following a confrontation with Jack at a clinic, Greg escapes to his and Pam's unfinished new house, where Andi shows up. She tries to cheer him up, but drinks too much wine and makes sexual advances towards him. Watching from a window and misunderstanding the situation, a disappointed Jack leaves and lies to Pam and Dina about not finding Greg.

Greg's parents Bernie and Roz rejoin the family the next day at the twins' birthday party. Enraged at Greg's apparent infidelity, Jack engages him in a physical fight despite Greg insisting that he was rejecting Andi. The fight ends with Jack having a heart attack and collapsing. Greg quickly takes charge of the situation, looking after Jack. As paramedics take him away, Jack quietly admits that he believes Greg after observing his carotid artery, which remained stable while he proclaimed his innocence. Impressed with his integrity and quick thinking, Jack approves of him to be "The Gregfocker".

Four months later, on Christmas Day, Greg and Pam's parents celebrate the holidays with them in their new house. Bernie informs Greg and Pam that he and Roz have sold their Miami home and are moving to Chicago, only two houses away from theirs. Jack and Dina decide that they will also move because they want to be close to their grandchildren, although Greg and Pam try to wean their respective parents off the idea. Later, Jack watches YouTube videos of Greg publicly mocking him during a speech promoting Sustengo.

== Cast ==
- Robert De Niro as Jack Byrnes
- Ben Stiller as Greg Focker
- Owen Wilson as Kevin Rawley
- Dustin Hoffman as Bernie Focker
- Barbra Streisand as Roz Focker
- Blythe Danner as Dina Byrnes
- Teri Polo as Pam Byrnes-Focker
- Jessica Alba as Andi Garcia
- Laura Dern as Prudence
- Colin Baiocchi as Henry Focker
- Daisy Tahan as Samantha Focker
- Kevin Hart as Nurse Louis
- Yul Vazquez as Junior
- Harvey Keitel as Randy Weir
- Thomas McCarthy as Dr. Bob Banks
- Olga Fonda as Svetlana
- Rob Huebel as Sleazy Doctor
- John DiMaggio and Jordan Peele as E.M.T.s
- Deepak Chopra as himself
- Nick Kroll as Young Doctor
- Sergio Calderón as Gustavo

== Production ==
Production of Little Fockers began in July 2009. Writer John Hamburg stated that the film would deal with "themes of death and divorce and all these real things that, as we get older, we start to think about, but in a really comical way".

Outside of the United States, it is the first film in the Fockers series to be released by Paramount Pictures, whose 2006 acquisition of the DreamWorks Pictures back-catalog included co-ownership of and sequel rights to the Meet the Parents franchise. DreamWorks remains a copyright co-holder, as "DW Studios", with Universal Pictures.

On August 24, 2010, it was announced that Dustin Hoffman would be reprising his role as Greg's father, Bernie Focker. The studio failed to reach salary terms with Hoffman until principal photography had officially wrapped. As a result, several alternative scenes were filmed in case of the negotiations failing. The character was ultimately included, but with a significantly smaller role than that in the previous entry.

== Release ==
In January 2010, the release date for the film was pushed back from July 30, 2010, to December 22, 2010, nominally because Universal hoped to benefit from the long Christmas weekend; it was later revealed to be deliberately delayed only because it was at the time of the delay announcement that Hoffman elected to reprise his character, and the producers had to adjust the filming schedule to accommodate for the filming of his scenes, keeping the announcement secret until the aforementioned August reveal.

The first trailer was released June 24, 2010, preceding showings of Grown Ups and Dinner for Schmucks. A second trailer, released November 10, 2010, was attached to Morning Glory, Unstoppable and Skyline. The film was released in the UK and US on December 22, 2010.

Little Fockers was released on DVD and Blu-ray April 5, 2011.

== Reception ==
=== Critical reception ===
On Rotten Tomatoes, Little Fockers has an approval rating of 10%, based on 147 reviews, with an average rating of 3.7/10. The site's critical consensus reads, "As star-studded as it is heartbreakingly lazy, Little Fockers takes the top-grossing trilogy to embarrassing new lows." On Metacritic, the film scored 27 out of 100, based on 32 critics, indicating "generally unfavorable" reviews. Audiences polled by CinemaScore gave the film an average grade of "B−" on a scale of A+ to F. On each of the three websites, it is Streisand's lowest-rated film.

Empire magazine gave the film two stars out of five. Its conclusion: "There are inevitably moments when Hoffman or Wilson get a laugh, but on the whole, it’s the same again, but weaker and with fewer good jokes."

=== Box office performance ===
Little Fockers failed to match the opening-weekend gross of its predecessor, Meet the Fockers. It opened with $30.8 million during its opening weekend on approximately 5,000 screens at 3,536 locations across US and Canada. Overall, its five-day opening generated a total of $48.3 million. By comparison, Meet the Fockers made $46.1 million during the same weekend in 2004, for a five-day total of $70.5 million. Little Fockers grossed $148.4 million in the United States and Canada, and $162.2 million from other countries around the world, for a worldwide total of $310.7 million, making it the lowest-grossing film in the trilogy.

=== Accolades ===
| Year | Award | Category | Work | Result |
|---|---|---|---|---|
| 2010 | Razzie Awards | Worst Supporting Actress | Jessica Alba | Won |
| 2010 | Razzie Awards | Worst Supporting Actress | Barbra Streisand | Nominated |
| 2010 | Razzie Awards | Worst Screenplay | John Hamburg and Larry Stuckey | Nominated |

== Sequel ==
A sequel to the film, Focker-in-Law, is scheduled to be released on November 25, 2026.
