= Focker-in-Law =

Upcoming American film

- Theatrical release poster
- Directed by: John Hamburg
- Screenplay by: John Hamburg
- Story by: John Hamburg; Ilana Glazer; Austen Earl
- Based on: Characters by Greg Glienna; Mary Ruth Clarke
- Produced by: Jane Rosenthal; Robert De Niro; Jay Roach; Ben Stiller; John Lesher; John Hamburg
- Starring: Robert De Niro; Ben Stiller; Ariana Grande; Owen Wilson; Blythe Danner; Teri Polo; Skyler Gisondo; Beanie Feldstein; Eduardo Franco
- Cinematography: Barry Peterson
- Music by: Theodore Shapiro
- Production companies: Tribeca Enterprises; Red Hour Productions; Delirious Media; Particular Pictures
- Distributed by: Universal Pictures (United States and Canada); Paramount Pictures (International)
- Release dates: November 11, 2026 (New York City); November 25, 2026 (United States)
- Running time: 105 minutes
- Country: United States
- Language: English

Focker-in-Law is a 2026 American comedy film written and directed by John Hamburg from a story by Hamburg, Ilana Glazer, and Austen Earl. It is the fourth installment in the Fockers film series and the sequel to Little Fockers (2010). Robert De Niro, Ben Stiller, Owen Wilson, Blythe Danner, and Teri Polo reprise their roles from the previous films, with Ariana Grande, (Note: Per her own request, Grande is credited on-screen with her full name, Ariana Grande-Butera.) Skyler Gisondo, and Beanie Feldstein joining the cast.

The film premiered in New York City on November 11, 2026, and is scheduled to be released on November 25, by Universal Pictures in the United States and Canada, and Paramount Pictures in all other countries.

== Premise ==
The story focuses on Greg and Pam Focker's now-grown son, Henry, who wants to propose marriage to a strong-willed woman whom Greg believes is a complete mismatch, though Greg's father-in-law, Jack Byrnes, is more accepting of her.

== Cast ==
- Robert De Niro as Jack Byrnes, a retired CIA agent and a Vietnam War veteran who is Greg's father-in-law, Pam's father, and Henry and Samantha's maternal grandfather.
- Ben Stiller as Gaylord "Greg" Focker, a nurse, Pam's husband and Henry and Samantha's father.
- Ariana Grande as Olivia Jones, life coach and former FBI hostage negotiator, Henry's girlfriend and potential bride-to-be.
- Owen Wilson as Kevin Rawley, Pam's ex-fiancé and a wealthy carpenter and stock investor.
- Blythe Danner as Dina Byrnes, Jack's wife, Pam's mother, and Henry and Samantha's maternal grandmother.
- Teri Polo as Pam Byrnes Focker, Greg's wife and Henry and Samantha's mother.
- Skyler Gisondo as Henry Focker, Greg and Pam's son and Olivia's boyfriend. Gisondo replaces Colin Baiocchi, who played Henry Focker in the previous film.
- Beanie Feldstein as Samantha Focker, Greg and Pam's daughter and Henry's fraternal twin sister. Feldstein replaces Daisy Tahan, who played Samantha Focker in the previous film.
- Eduardo Franco as Eduardo Villalobos, Samantha’s long-term boyfriend.
- Cole Escola
- Mike Birbiglia

== Production ==
In December 2024, a new film in the Fockers franchise was reported to be in development at Universal Pictures. John Hamburg was set to write the script, while Robert De Niro, Ben Stiller, Teri Polo, and Blythe Danner were negotiating to reprise their roles from the previous films.

In March 2025, Hamburg was confirmed to be writing and directing the film. The cast was confirmed to reprise their roles as well. In May 2025, Ariana Grande joined the cast.

In June 2025, it was announced that Paramount Pictures, co-financier and the international distributor of Little Fockers (2010), would co-produce the film. Later that month, Owen Wilson joined the cast, reprising his role as Kevin Rawley. In late July, Skyler Gisondo was in talks to join the film. Later that month, it was announced that the film had been titled Focker-in-Law, with Gisondo confirmed to be joining the cast alongside Beanie Feldstein. In November 2025, it was revealed that Eduardo Franco was a part of the cast.

Principal photography began in New York City on August 18, 2025, and wrapped on November 1.

Theodore Shapiro composed the score for the film.

== Release ==
Focker-in-Law premiered at the Beacon Theatre in New York City on November 11, 2026, and is scheduled to be released in the United States by Universal Pictures on November 25, 2026, and internationally by Paramount Pictures. The film's first trailer was released on April 15, 2026.
