= Ben Stiller filmography =

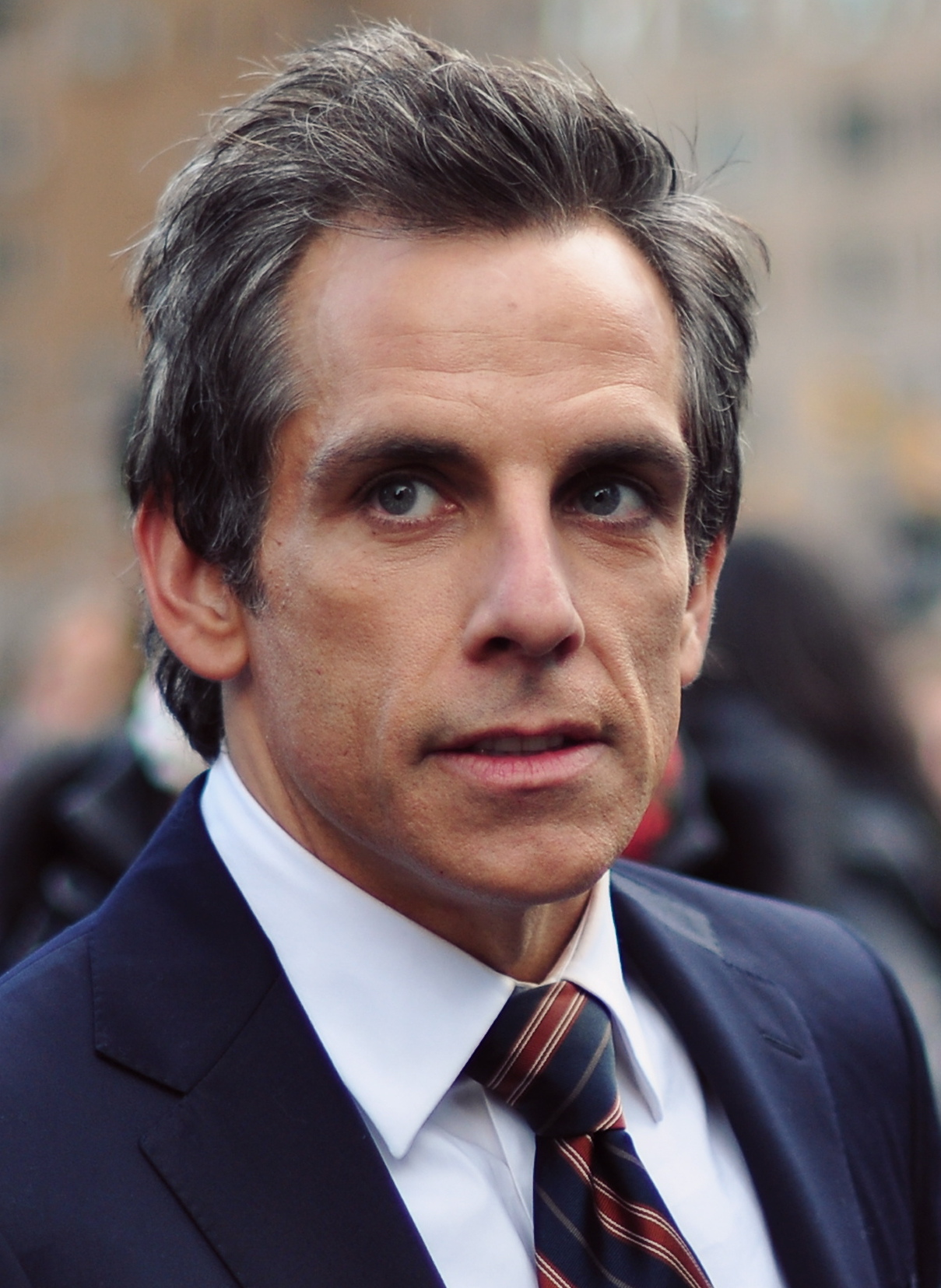
Stiller filming Tower Heist, 2010

Ben Stiller is an American actor, comedian, director, producer and screenwriter. He has mostly appeared in comedy films. Stiller is an Emmy Award winner for his television show The Ben Stiller Show, which he directed, produced, and wrote.

He has appeared in many films since 1987, most recently in 2024's Nutcrackers. He has also directed and written several films in which he also appeared as an actor.

In television, he has played multiple roles, starting in 1984. He has also played roles in music videos, video games, and web series.

== Film ==
Year	Title	Actor	Director	Producer	Writer	Role	Notes	Ref(s)
1987	Hot Pursuit	Yes	No	No	No	Chris Honeywell		
1987	Empire of the Sun	Yes	No	No	No	Dainty		
1987	Shoeshine	Yes	No	No	No	Investment Banker	Short film	
1988	Fresh Horses	Yes	No	No	No	Tipton		
1989	That's Adequate	Yes	No	No	No	Chip Lane		
1989	Next of Kin	Yes	No	No	No	Lawrence Isabella		
1989	Elvis Stories	Yes	Yes	No	Yes	Bruce	Short film	
1990	Stella	Yes	No	No	No	Jim Uptegrove		
1991	Highway to Hell	Yes	No	No	No	Pluto's Cook / Attila The Hun		
1992	The Nutt House	Yes	No	No	No	Pie Thrower		
1994	Reality Bites	Yes	Yes	No	Uncredited	Michael Grates	Feature directorial debut	
1995	Heavyweights	Yes	No	No	No	Tony Perkis / Tony Perkis Sr.		
1996	Happy Gilmore	Uncredited	No	No	No	Hal L. – Orderly in Nursing Home		
1996	If Lucy Fell	Yes	No	No	No	Bwick Elias		
1996	Flirting with Disaster	Yes	No	No	No	Mel Coplin		
1996	The Cable Guy	Yes	Yes	No	Uncredited	Sam Sweet / Stan Sweet		
1998	Zero Effect	Yes	No	No	No	Steve Arlo		
1998	There's Something About Mary	Yes	No	No	No	Ted Stroehmann		
1998	Your Friends & Neighbors	Yes	No	No	No	Jerry		
1998	Permanent Midnight	Yes	No	No	No	Jerry Stahl		
1999	The Suburbans	Yes	No	No	No	Jay Rose		
1999	Mystery Men	Yes	No	No	No	Mr. Furious / Roy		
1999	Black and White	Yes	No	No	No	Mark Clear		
2000	The Independent	Yes	No	No	No	Cop	Cameo	
2000	Keeping the Faith	Yes	No	No	No	Rabbi Jake Schram		
2000	Meet the Parents	Yes	No	No	No	Gaylord "Greg" Focker		
2001	Zoolander	Yes	Yes	Yes	Yes	Derek Zoolander		
2001	The Royal Tenenbaums	Yes	No	No	No	Chas Tenenbaum		
2002	Orange County	Yes	No	No	No	The Firefighter	Cameo	
2002	Run Ronnie Run!	Yes	No	No	No	Himself	Cameo	
2003	Crooked Lines	No	No	Executive	No	—N/a		
2003	Duplex	Yes	No	Yes	No	Alex Rose		
2003	Nobody Knows Anything!	Yes	No	No	No	Peach Expert	Cameo	
2003	Pauly Shore Is Dead	Yes	No	No	No	Himself	Cameo	
2004	Along Came Polly	Yes	No	No	No	Reuben Feffer		
2004	Starsky & Hutch	Yes	No	Executive	No	David Starsky		
2004	Envy	Yes	No	No	No	Tim Dingman		
2004	Dodgeball: A True Underdog Story	Yes	No	Yes	No	White Goodman		
2004	Anchorman: The Legend of Ron Burgundy	Yes	No	No	No	Arturo Mendez	Cameo	
2004	Meet the Fockers	Yes	No	No	No	Gaylord "Greg" Focker		
2005	Madagascar	Yes	No	No	No	Alex	Voice role	
2006	Danny Roane: First Time Director	Yes	No	No	No	Himself	Cameo	
2006	School for Scoundrels	Yes	No	No	No	Lonnie		
2006	Tenacious D in The Pick of Destiny	Yes	No	Executive	No	The Guitar Center Store SalesGuy	Cameo	
2006	Night at the Museum	Yes	No	No	No	Lawrence "Larry" Daley		
2006	Awesome; I Fuckin' Shot That!	Yes	No	No	No	Himself	Concert film	
2007	Blades of Glory	No	No	Yes	No	—N/a		
2007	The Heartbreak Kid	Yes	No	No	No	Edward "Eddie" Cantrow		
2008	The Ruins	No	No	Executive	No	—N/a		
2008	Tropic Thunder	Yes	Yes	Yes	Yes	Tugg Speedman		
2008	Madagascar: Escape 2 Africa	Yes	No	No	No	Alex	Voice role	
2009	The Boys: The Sherman Brothers' Story	Yes	No	Executive	No	Himself	Documentary film	
2009	Night at the Museum: Battle of the Smithsonian	Yes	No	No	No	Lawrence "Larry" Daley		
2009	The Marc Pease Experience	Yes	No	No	No	Jon Gribble		
2010	Greenberg	Yes	No	No	No	Roger Greenberg		
2010	I'm Still Here	Yes	No	No	No	Himself	Cameo	
2010	Submarine	Yes	No	Executive	No	Soap Opera Star	Cameo	
2010	Megamind	Yes	No	Executive	No	Bernard	Voice role; cameo	
2010	Little Fockers	Yes	No	No	No	Gaylord "Greg" Focker		
2011	30 Minutes or Less	No	No	Yes	No	—N/a		
2011	The Big Year	No	No	Executive	No	—N/a		
2011	Tower Heist	Yes	No	No	No	Josh Kovaks		
2012	Madagascar 3: Europe's Most Wanted	Yes	No	No	No	Alex	Voice role	
2012	The Watch	Yes	No	No	No	Evan Trautwig		
2013	He's Way More Famous Than You	Yes	No	No	No	Himself		
2013	The Secret Life of Walter Mitty	Yes	Yes	Yes	No	Walter Mitty		
2014	While We're Young	Yes	No	No	No	Josh Schrebnick		
2014	Penguins of Madagascar	Archived audio	No	No	No	Alex		
2014	Night at the Museum: Secret of the Tomb	Yes	No	No	No	Lawrence "Larry" Daley / Laaa		
2015	Being Canadian	Yes	No	No	No	Himself	Documentary film	
2016	Zoolander 2	Yes	Yes	Yes	Yes	Derek Zoolander		
2016	Don't Think Twice	Yes	No	No	No	Himself		
2016	Why Him?	No	No	Yes	No	—N/a		
2017	The Polka King	No	No	Executive	No	—N/a		
2017	Brad's Status	Yes	No	No	No	Brad Sloan		
2017	The Meyerowitz Stories	Yes	No	No	No	Matthew Meyerowitz		
2018	Alex Strangelove	No	No	Yes	No	—N/a		
2018	The Package	No	No	Yes	No	—N/a		
2019	Greed	Yes	No	No	No	Himself	Cameo	
2019	Plus One	No	No	Executive	No	—N/a		
2020	Dinner in America	No	No	Yes	No	—N/a		
2020	Have a Good Trip: Adventures in Psychedelics	Yes	No	Yes	No	Himself	Documentary film	
2020	Hubie Halloween	Yes	No	No	No	Orderly Hal		
2020	Friendsgiving	No	No	Yes	No	—N/a		
2021	Locked Down	Yes	No	No	No	Guy		
2021	Queenpins	No	No	Executive	No	—N/a		
2022	Bros	Uncredited	No	No	No	Himself	Cameo	
2022	Bleecker	Yes	No	No	No	Dr. Pots		
2024	Nutcrackers	Yes	No	No	No	Mike		
2024	Dear Santa	Uncredited	No	No	No	Lucifer		
2025	Happy Gilmore 2	Yes	No	No	No	Hal L. – Orderly in Nursing Home		
2025	Stiller & Meara: Nothing Is Lost	Yes	Yes	Yes	No	Himself	Documentary film	
2026	The Dink	Yes	No	Yes	No	Dr. Stone		
2026	Focker-in-Law †	Yes	No	Yes	No	Gaylord "Greg" Focker	Post-production	
TBA	A Matter of Time †	Yes	No	No	No	TBA	Filming	

Key
†	Denotes productions that have not yet been released

== Television ==
Year	Title	Actor	Director	Producer	Writer	Role	Notes	Ref(s)
1986	Kate & Allie	Yes	No	No	No	Peter	Episode: "Too Late the Rebel"	
1987	Miami Vice	Yes	No	No	No	Fast Eddie Felcher	Episode: "Amen... Send Money"	
1987	American Playhouse	Yes	No	No	No	Ronnie Shaughnessy	Episode: "The House of Blue Leaves"	
1989	Saturday Night Live	Yes	No	No	Yes	Various	4 episodes	
1990	Working Tra$h	Yes	No	No	No	Freddy Novak	Television film	
1990–1995	The Ben Stiller Show	Yes	Yes	Yes	Yes	Himself		
1993	Frasier	Yes	No	No	No	Barry	Episode: "Miracle on Third or Fourth Street"	
1995	Duckman	Yes	No	No	No	Harry Medfly	Voice role; episode: "Clip Job"	
1995	2 Stupid Dogs	Yes	No	No	No	Tony Robbins-style character	Voice role	
1996	NewsRadio	Yes	No	No	No	Vic	Episode: "The Trainer"	
1997	Friends	Yes	No	No	No	Tommy	Episode: "The One with the Screamer"	
1997	The Larry Sanders Show	Yes	No	No	No	Himself	Episode: "Make a Wish"	
1998	Space Ghost Coast to Coast	Yes	No	No	No	Himself	Episode: "Rio Ghosto"	
1998	1998 MTV Video Music Awards	Yes	No	No	Yes	Himself (host)	Television special	
1998	Dr. Katz, Professional Therapist	Yes	No	No	No	Himself	Voice; episode: "Ticket"	
1998–2011	Saturday Night Live	Yes	No	No	No	Himself (host)	2 episodes	
1999	Heat Vision and Jack	Yes	Yes	Executive	No	Strip Club DJ		
1999	Freaks and Geeks	Yes	No	No	No	Secret Service Agent	Episode: "The Little Things"	
2000	Sesame Street	Yes	No	No	No	Himself	Episode #31.1	
2001	Undeclared	Yes	No	No	No	Rex	Episode: "Eric's POV"	
2002	The Simpsons	Yes	No	No	No	Garth Motherloving	Voice role; episode: "Sweets and Sour Marge"	
2002	Prehistoric Planet	Yes	No	No	No	Narrator	Season 1	
2002	The King of Queens	Yes	No	No	No	Jerry	Episode: "Shrink Wrap"	
2002	Hooves of Fire	Yes	No	No	No	Robbie	Voice role (U.S. redub)	
2002	Legend of the Lost Tribe	Yes	No	No	No	Robbie	Voice role (U.S. redub)	
2002–2003	Liberty's Kids	Yes	No	No	No	Thomas Jefferson	Voice role; episodes: "The First Fourth of July", "Conflict in the South"	
2004	King of the Hill	Yes	No	No	No	Rich	Voice role; episode: "That's What She Said"	
2004	Curb Your Enthusiasm	Yes	No	No	No	Himself	3 episodes	
2004–2006, 2013, 2018–2019	Arrested Development	Yes	No	No	No	Tony Wonder	8 episodes	
2005	Extras	Yes	No	No	No	Himself	Episode: "Ben Stiller"	
2007	Family Guy	Yes	No	No	No	Himself	Voice role; episode: "No Meals on Wheels"	
2007	Bob & Doug McKenzie's Two-Four Anniversary	Yes	No	No	No	Himself	Documentary	
2007	Elmo's Christmas Countdown	Yes	No	No	No	Stiller the Elf	Voice role; Television film	
2009	Merry Madagascar	Yes	No	No	No	Alex	Voice role; Television special	
2010	Phineas and Ferb	Yes	No	No	No	Khaka Peu Peu	Voice role; episode: "The Beak"	
2010	Tim and Eric Awesome Show, Great Job!	Yes	No	No	No	Himself	Episode: "Man Milk"	
2010	The Trip	Uncredited	No	No	No	Himself	Cameo	
2011	Take Two with Phineas and Ferb	Yes	No	No	No	Himself	Episode: "Ben Stiller"	
2011	Onion News Network	Yes	No	No	No	Himself	Episode: "Real America"	
2012	Eagleheart	Yes	No	No	No	Silly Sammy	Episode: "Silly Sammy"	
2013	Madly Madagascar	Yes	No	No	No	Alex	Voice role; Television special	
2013	The Birthday Boys	Yes	No	Executive	No	Roger / Mr. Turner	Episode: "Rock and Roll"	
2014	Running Wild with Bear Grylls	Yes	No	No	No	Himself	Episode 1.2	
2014–2016	The Meltdown with Jonah and Kumail	No	No	Yes	No	—N/a		
2015	Workaholics	Yes	No	No	No	Del Jacobson	Episode: "Front Yard Wrestling"	
2015	Another Period	Yes	No	Executive	No	Charles Ponzi	Episode: "Lillian's Birthday"	
2015	Big Time in Hollywood, FL	Yes	No	Executive	No	Jimmy Staats	Episode: "Severance"	
2016	Zoolander: Super Model	Yes	No	Yes	No	Derek Zoolander	Voice role; Television film	
2016	Maya & Marty	Yes	No	No	No	Dr. Reginald Stone	Episode: "John Cena, Nick Jonas, Eva Longoria and Ben Stiller"	
2016	Haters Back Off	Yes	No	No	No	Bob Hamburg's nephew	Episode: "Netwerking at the Nursing Home"	
2018	Escape at Dannemora	No	Yes	Executive	No	—N/a		
2018–2019	Saturday Night Live	Yes	No	No	No	Michael Cohen	Cameo role; 6 episodes	
2019–2022	In The Dark	No	No	Executive	No	—N/a		
2020	Sarah Cooper: Everything's Fine	Yes	No	No	No	8008s	Television special	
2020	La Flamme	No	No	Executive	No	—N/a	French adaptation of Burning Love	
2022–2025	Severance	Uncredited (Note: Ben Stiller has an uncredited voice cameo as an animated version of Kier Eagan.)	Yes	Executive	No	—N/a		
2022	Le Flambeau: Les Aventuriers de Chupacabra	No	No	Executive	No	—N/a		
2023	Krapopolis	Yes	No	No	No	Prometheus	Voice role; episode: "Prometheus"	
2026	Born to Bowl	No	No	Executive	No	—N/a	Documentary series	
TBA	The Off Weeks	Yes	No	Executive	No	Gus Adler	Upcoming miniseries	

== Video games ==
Year	Title	Role	Notes	Ref(s)
2009	Night at the Museum: Battle of the Smithsonian: The Video Game	Lawrence "Larry" Daley	Voice role	

== Music videos ==
Year	Title	Artist	Album	Role	Ref(s)
1999	"All Star"	Smash Mouth	Astro Lounge	Song was featured in Mystery Men, in which Stiller appeared; this song also appeared in Shrek	
2000	"Rollin' (Air Raid Vehicle)"	Limp Bizkit	Chocolate Starfish and the Hot Dog Flavored Water	Himself	
2001	"Bad Boy for Life"	Sean Combs	The Saga Continues...	P. Diddy's Neighbor	
2002	"Tribute"	Tenacious D	Tenacious D	Himself	
2004	"Taylor"	Jack Johnson	On and On	Himself	
2007	"Closer"	Travis	The Boy with No Name	Supermarket Manager	
2024	"Drive"	SZA	Lana	Himself	

== Web series ==
Year	Title	Role	Notes	Ref(s)
2010–11	Stiller & Meara	Himself	Also director and producer	
2012–13	Burning Love	Joe Rutherford	Also executive producer	
