= List of awards and nominations received by Ben Stiller =

Ben Stiller awards and nominations
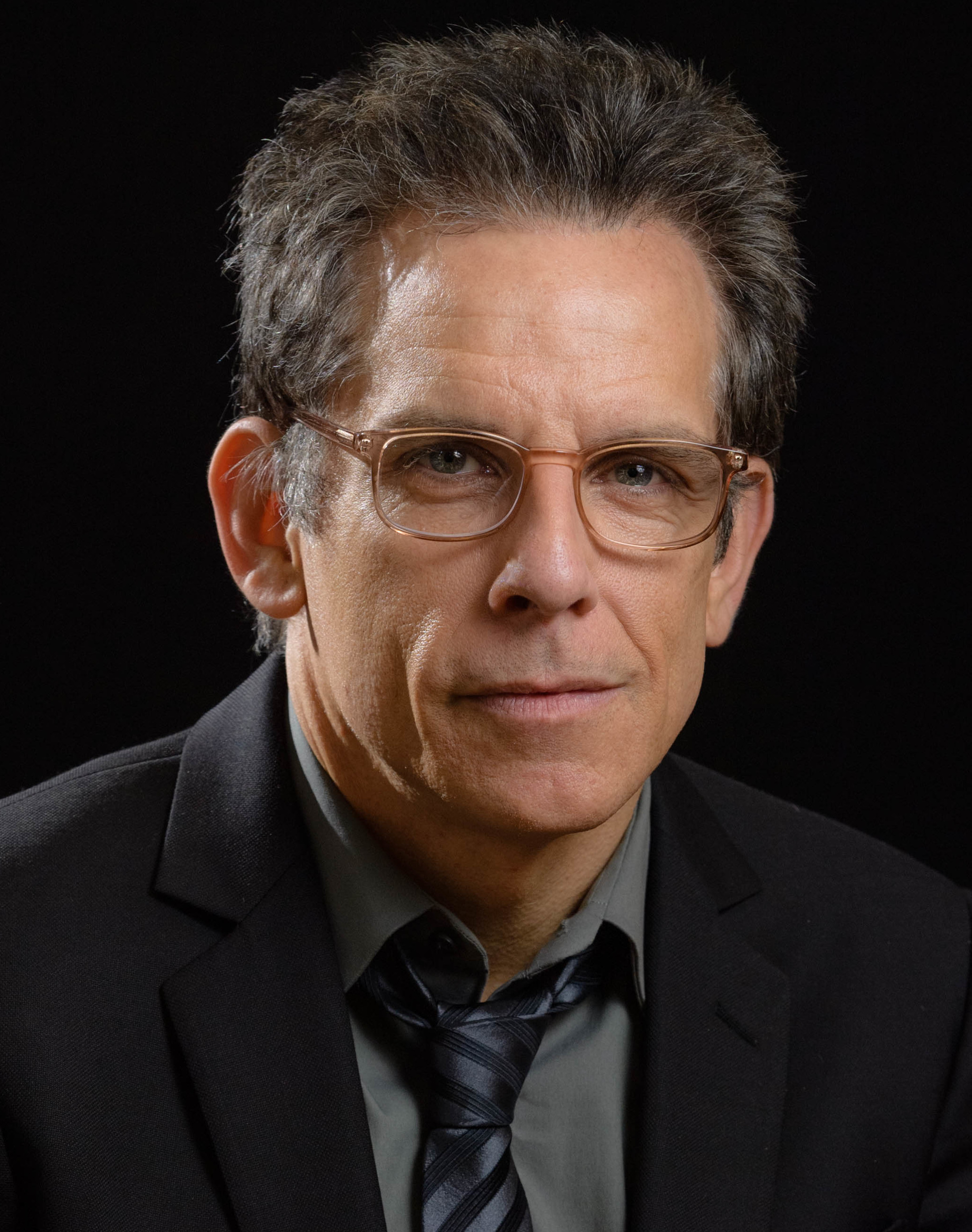
- Stiller in 2019
Awards and nominations
Award	Wins	Nominations
BAFTA Awards	1	1
Emmy Awards	1	9
DGA Awards	1	2
Spirit Awards	0	1

Totals (Note: Certain award groups do not simply award one winner. They acknowledge several different recipients, have runners-up, and have third place. Since this is a specific recognition and is different from losing an award, runner-up mentions are considered wins in this award tally. For simplification and to avoid errors, each award in this list has been presumed to have had a prior nomination.)
- Wins: 11
- Nominations: 68

This article is a list of awards and nominations received by Ben Stiller.

Ben Stiller is an American actor, comedian and filmmaker. He has received a Directors Guild of America Award, a Primetime Emmy Award, a Peabody Award, three MTV Movie Awards, a Nickelodeon Kids' Choice Awards, and a Teen Choice Award as well as nominations for an Independent Spirit Award, two People's Choice Awards, and a Saturn Award. In 2011, he won the Charlie Chaplin Award for Excellence in Comedy.

Stiller, the son of comedians Jerry Stiller and Anne Meara, started his career an actor on the NBC sketch series Saturday Night Live in 1989 before he created his own MTV variety series The Ben Stiller Show (1990–1993), where he earned the Primetime Emmy Award for Outstanding Writing for a Variety Series. He then established himself as a comedy film star alongside the Frat Pack where he acted in films such as There's Something About Mary (1998), the Meet the Parents trilogy (2000–2010), Zoolander (2001), Along Came Polly (2004), Dodgeball (2004), and Tropic Thunder (2008), the later of which he also directed. He also acted in the Night at the Museum trilogy (2006–2014) and Madagascar film franchise (2005–2012).

Also known for his work in independent films, he made his directorial debut with the romance Reality Bites (1994). He then took roles in the David O. Russell black comedy film Flirting with Disaster (1996), the Wes Anderson family dramedy The Royal Tenenbaums (2001), and three Noah Baumbach independent dramedies starting with Greenberg (2010) which earned him a nomination for the Independent Spirit Award for Best Male Lead followed by While We're Young (2014), and The Meyerowitz Stories (2017). He directed his fifth film, The Secret Life of Walter Mitty (2013).

He then established himself as a television director and show runner. In 2018 he directed the Showtime limited series Escape at Dannemora, earning a Directors Guild of America Award and two Primetime Emmy Award nominations for Outstanding Limited Series and Outstanding Directing for a Limited Series. Since 2022, he has directed and executive produced the Apple TV+ psychological thriller series Severance, earning two Primetime Emmy Award nominations for Outstanding Drama Series and Outstanding Directing in a Drama Series.

== Major associations ==
=== BAFTA Awards ===
Year	Category	Nominated work	Result	Ref.
Britannia Awards
2011	Charlie Chaplin Award for Excellence in Comedy		Won	

=== Directors Guild of America ===
Year	Category	Nominated work	Result	Ref.
Directors Guild of America Awards
2018	Outstanding Directing for a Limited Series or TV Movie	Escape at Dannemora	Won	
2023	Outstanding Directing – Drama Series	Severance	Nominated	

=== Emmy Awards ===
Year	Category	Nominated work	Result	Ref.
Primetime Emmy Awards
1993	Outstanding Writing for a Variety or Music Program	The Ben Stiller Show	Won	
2006	Outstanding Guest Actor in a Comedy Series	Extras	Nominated	
2015	Outstanding Short-Format Live-Action Program	Burning Love	Nominated	
2019	Outstanding Limited Series (as Executive Producer)	Escape at Dannemora	Nominated	
2019	Outstanding Directing for a Limited Series	Escape at Dannemora	Nominated	
2022	Outstanding Drama Series (as executive producer)	Severance (season one)	Nominated	
2022	Outstanding Directing for a Drama Series	Severance (for “The We We Are”)	Nominated	
2025	Outstanding Drama Series (as executive producer)	Severance (season two)	Nominated	
2025	Outstanding Directing for a Drama Series	Severance (for “Cold Harbor”)	Nominated	

=== Independent Spirit Awards ===
Year	Category	Nominated work	Result	Ref.
2010	Best Male Lead	Greenberg	Nominated	

== Miscellaneous awards ==
Organizations	Year	Category	Work	Result	Ref.
American Comedy Awards	1999	Funniest Actor in a Motion Picture (Leading Role)	There's Something About Mary	Nominated	
American Comedy Awards	2001	Funniest Actor in a Motion Picture (Leading Role)	Meet the Parents	Won	
Blockbuster Entertainment Awards	1999	Favorite Actor – Comedy	There's Something About Mary	Nominated	
Blockbuster Entertainment Awards	2001	Favorite Actor – Comedy/Romance	Meet the Parents	Nominated	
Comedy Film Awards	2010	Best Leading Actor	Greenberg	Nominated	
Dublin Film Critics' Circle	2010	Best Actor	Greenberg	Nominated	
Golden Raspberry Awards	2005	Worst Actor	Along Came Polly / Anchorman / Dodgeball; Envy / Starsky & Hutch	Nominated	
Golden Raspberry Awards	2017	Worst Actor	Zoolander 2	Nominated	
Golden Raspberry Awards	2017	Worst Director	Zoolander 2	Nominated	
Golden Raspberry Awards	2017	Worst Screen Combo	Zoolander 2	Nominated	
Hollywood Film Festival	2008	Comedy of the Year	Tropic Thunder	Won	
MTV Movie & TV Awards	1999	Best Fight (For the fight against Puffy the Dog)	There's Something About Mary	Won	
MTV Movie & TV Awards	1999	Best Comedic Performance	There's Something About Mary	Nominated	
MTV Movie & TV Awards	1999	Best Kiss (shared with Cameron Diaz)	There's Something About Mary	Nominated	
MTV Movie & TV Awards	1999	Best On-Screen Duo (shared with Cameron Diaz)	There's Something About Mary	Nominated	
MTV Movie & TV Awards	2001	Best Comedic Performance	Meet the Parents	Won	
MTV Movie & TV Awards	2001	Best On-Screen Team (shared with Robert De Niro)	Meet the Parents	Nominated	
MTV Movie & TV Awards	2002	Best Dressed	Zoolander	Nominated	
MTV Movie & TV Awards	2002	Best Line (Note: ("There's more to life than just being really, really, ridiculously good looking."))	Zoolander	Nominated	
MTV Movie & TV Awards	2002	Best On-Screen Team (shared with Owen Wilson)	Zoolander	Nominated	
MTV Movie & TV Awards	2004	Best On-Screen Team (shared with Owen Wilson)	Starsky & Hutch	Nominated	
MTV Movie & TV Awards	2004	Best Dance Sequence (shared with Jennifer Aniston)	Along Came Polly	Nominated	
MTV Movie & TV Awards	2005	Best Villain	DodgeBall: A True Underdog Story	Won	
MTV Movie & TV Awards	2005	Best Comedic Performance	DodgeBall: A True Underdog Story	Nominated	
MTV Movie & TV Awards	2007	Best Comedic Performance	Night at the Museum	Nominated	
MTV Movie & TV Awards	2009	Best WTF Moment	Tropic Thunder	Nominated	
MTV Movie & TV Awards	2010	Best Comedic Performance	Night at the Museum: Battle of the Smithsonian	Nominated	
New York Film Festival	2013	Best Film	The Secret Life of Walter Mitty	Nominated	
Nickelodeon Kids' Choice Awards	2006	Favorite Voice from an Animated Movie	Madagascar	Nominated	
Nickelodeon Kids' Choice Awards	2009	Favorite Voice from an Animated Movie	Madagascar: Escape 2 Africa	Nominated	
Nickelodeon Kids' Choice Awards	2013	Favorite Voice from an Animated Movie	Madagascar 3: Europe's Most Wanted	Nominated	
Nickelodeon Kids' Choice Awards	2015	Favorite Movie Actor	Night at the Museum: Secret of the Tomb	Won	
Peabody Awards	2022	Entertainment	Severance	Won	
People's Choice Awards	2005	Favorite On-Screen Chemistry (shared with Owen Wilson)	Starsky & Hutch	Nominated	
People's Choice Awards	2013	Favorite Comedic Movie Actor	Madagascar 3: Europe's Most Wanted	Nominated	
Phoenix Film Critics Society	2002	Best Cast	The Royal Tenenbaums	Nominated	
Satellite Awards	2002	Best Actor – Motion Picture Musical or Comedy	Zoolander	Nominated	
Satellite Awards	2002	Best Supporting Actor – Musical or Comedy	The Royal Tenenbaums	Nominated	
Saturn Award	2014	Best Actor	The Secret Life of Walter Mitty	Nominated	
Seoul International Drama Awards	2025	Golden Bird Prize	Severance	Won	
Stinkers Bad Movie Awards	2004	Worst Actor	Along Came Polly / Dodgeball / Envy; Meet the Fockers / Starsky & Hutch	Nominated	
Teen Choice Awards	1999	Choice Movie: Actor	There's Something About Mary	Nominated	
Teen Choice Awards	2000	Choice Movie: Hissy Fit	Mystery Men	Nominated	
Teen Choice Awards	2001	Choice Movie: Actor	Meet the Parents	Nominated	
Teen Choice Awards	2002	Choice Movie: Hissy Fit	Zoolander	Won	
Teen Choice Awards	2002	Choice Movie Actor: Comedy	Zoolander	Nominated	
Teen Choice Awards	2004	Choice Movie Actor: Comedy	Starsky & Hutch	Nominated	
Teen Choice Awards	2004	Choice Movie: Chemistry (shared with Owen Wilson)	Starsky & Hutch	Nominated	
Teen Choice Awards	2004	Choice Movie: Blush Scene	Along Came Polly	Nominated	
Teen Choice Awards	2004	Choice Movie: Hissy Fit	Along Came Polly	Nominated	
Teen Choice Awards	2005	Choice Movie Actor: Comedy	Meet the Fockers	Nominated	
Teen Choice Awards	2005	Choice Movie: Blush Scene (Note: (Greg's engagement party speech))	Meet the Fockers	Nominated	
Teen Choice Awards	2005	Choice Movie: Liar	Meet the Fockers	Nominated	
Teen Choice Awards	2007	Choice Movie Actor: Comedy	Night at the Museum	Nominated	
Teen Choice Awards	2009	Choice Movie Actor: Comedy	Tropic Thunder	Nominated	
Teen Choice Awards	2009	Choice Movie Actor: Comedy	Night at the Museum: Battle of the Smithsonian	Nominated	
Teen Choice Awards	2015	Choice Movie Actor: Comedy	Night at the Museum: Secret of the Tomb	Nominated	
