= Frat Pack =

Nickname given to a group of American comedy actors

The Frat Pack is a nickname given to a group of American comedy actors who have appeared together in many of the highest-grossing comedy films since the mid-1990s. The group is usually considered to include Ben Stiller, Owen Wilson, Luke Wilson, Will Ferrell, Steve Carell, Jack Black, Seth Rogen, Paul Rudd, and Vince Vaughn.

== Origins ==
The term was used by USA Today in a June 2004 story and was soon picked up by other media outlets. Before USA Today dubbed this group the "Frat Pack", Entertainment Weekly had referred to them as the "Slacker Pack", having earlier coined the term "Frat Pack" to describe actors Leonardo DiCaprio, Tobey Maguire, Matt Damon, Ben Affleck, and Edward Norton, who have acted together in dramas. By 2005, Entertainment Weekly had dropped the "Slacker Pack" term and followed suit, referring to the aforementioned crop of actors as the "Frat Pack".

The name is an allusion to the Rat Pack (and the later Brat Pack), combined with a reference to the group's popular fraternity-related film Old School, and the sophomoric style of humor employed in many of their films.

== Membership ==
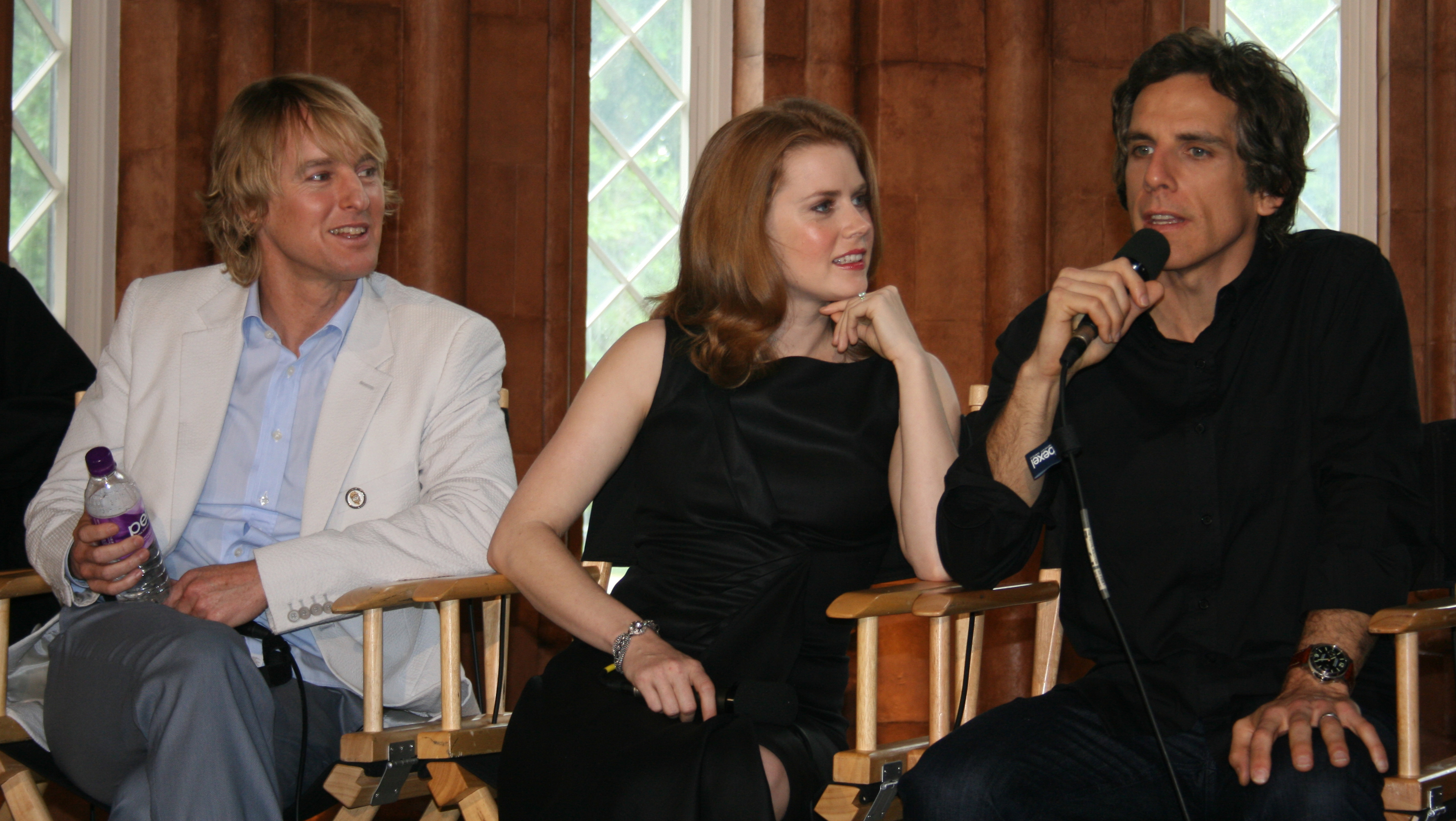
Owen Wilson (left) and Ben Stiller (right) with Amy Adams promoting Night at the Museum: Battle of the Smithsonian in May 2009

The core members initially included Jack Black, Will Ferrell, Ben Stiller, Vince Vaughn, and brothers Owen Wilson and Luke Wilson, all of whom were recognized by USA Today in an early feature. Later, John C. Reilly, David Koechner, and Steve Carell were also included in the Pack. The previous year, USA Today had listed Carell, Paul Rudd, David Koechner, and Leslie Mann as the Frat Pack's "Junior Varsity". While hosting Saturday Night Live in September 2005, Carell indirectly claimed membership by mentioning Stiller, Vaughn, Ferrell, Wilson (Owen), and Black, and saying he was "one of those guys now".

In 2005, Details Magazine called Judd Apatow, Adam McKay, and Todd Phillips "The Frat Packagers". A year later, Paul Rudd was called a Frat Pack member by the New York Post and other publications. Asked by an interviewer with The Advocate whether Knocked Up would usher him into the Frat Pack, Rudd said he was a "pledge" that hasn't "been initiated yet into the brotherhood".

Years later, in a 2011 interview, Rudd acknowledged his association with the group by saying, "As far as the Frat Pack concept goes, I'm happy to be included. I think the elder statesmen in it are really talented, and I'm a fan of all of them." In a 2008 interview with Moviefone's Unscripted, Jack Black jokingly initiated Robert Downey Jr. into the Frat Pack, due to his starring role in Tropic Thunder with Black and Ben Stiller.

The members of the Frat Pack have worked regularly with certain directors. Wes Anderson is a college friend of the Wilsons and directed them in both Bottle Rocket and The Royal Tenenbaums (which also starred Stiller). Todd Phillips directed Old School and Starsky & Hutch. Adam McKay directed Anchorman: The Legend of Ron Burgundy, Talladega Nights: The Ballad of Ricky Bobby, and Step Brothers, which included John C. Reilly in a lead role. Judd Apatow is the writer and producer of several Frat Pack comedies, including Anchorman: The Legend of Ron Burgundy. He made his directorial debut with The 40-Year-Old Virgin, starring Steve Carell, and followed up with Knocked Up, starring Seth Rogen and Paul Rudd, with a cameo by Carell. Apatow was also a co-creator of The Ben Stiller Show. Wedding Crashers director David Dobkin worked again with Vince Vaughn for the Christmas comedy film Fred Claus (2007).

The Farrelly Brothers have directed Frat Pack members Ben Stiller in There's Something About Mary and The Heartbreak Kid, Jack Black in Shallow Hal and Owen Wilson in Hall Pass.

== Filmography ==
While no film so far has featured every member of the Frat Pack, numerous films have featured multiple members. To date, Anchorman: The Legend of Ron Burgundy features the most members, with every member except Owen Wilson appearing in some capacity. Additionally, Will Ferrell and Ben Stiller were both cast members of Saturday Night Live, as was frequent collaborator David Koechner; all members have hosted Saturday Night Live as well. Ferrell, Koechner, and Black all made guest appearances on The Office, which starred Steve Carell for most of its run. All members have presented during the Academy Awards; additionally, Carell and Owen Wilson have both been nominated (the former for Best Actor for Foxcatcher and the latter for Best Original Screenplay for The Royal Tenenbaums).

Movie/Series/Misc.	Jack Black	Ben Stiller	Luke Wilson	Owen Wilson	Vince Vaughn	Will Ferrell	Paul Rudd	Seth Rogen	David Koechner	Steve Carell	Close contributors
Bottle Rocket (1996)			Lead role	Lead role, writer							Wes Anderson (director, co-writer), Andrew Wilson
The Cable Guy (1996)	Supporting role	Director, cameo		Supporting role							Judd Apatow (producer), Jim Carrey, Leslie Mann, Andy Dick, David Cross, Janeane Garofalo
Bongwater (1997)	Supporting role		Lead role								Kyle Gass, Andy Dick, Janeane Garofalo, Brittany Murphy
Permanent Midnight (1998)		Lead role		Supporting role							Andy Dick, Fred Willard, Janeane Garofalo
Rushmore (1998)			Minor role	Co-writer							Wes Anderson (director, co-writer), Bill Murray, Andrew Wilson
Austin Powers: The Spy Who Shagged Me (1999)						Supporting role			Cameo		Tim Robbins
The Suburbans (1999)		Supporting role				Lead role					Jerry Stiller
Freaks and Geeks (1999–2000)		Minor role						Lead role	Minor role		Jason Segel, James Franco, Martin Starr, David Krumholtz
Meet the Parents (2000)		Lead role		Supporting role							Judah Friedlander, Teri Polo, Shauna Robertson
The Royal Tenenbaums (2001)		Lead role	Lead role	Lead role, co-writer, Oscar nominee							Wes Anderson (director, producer, co-writer, Oscar nominee), Andrew Wilson, Bill Murray
Zoolander (2001)		Lead role, director, writer, producer		Lead role	Minor role	Lead role					Christine Taylor, Andrew Wilson, Jerry Stiller, Andy Dick, Judah Friedlander, Stuart Cornfeld (producer), Patton Oswalt, James Marsden
Undeclared (2001–2002)		Minor role				Minor role		Lead role			David Krumholtz, Martin Starr, Jay Baruchel
Orange County (2002)	Lead role	Minor role									Leslie Mann
Run Ronnie Run! (2002)	Minor role	Cameo							Supporting role		David Cross
The Third Wheel (2002)			Lead role						Minor role		Melissa McCarthy
Old School (2003)			Lead role		Lead role	Lead role					Todd Phillips (director), Matt Walsh, Andy Dick
Starsky & Hutch (2004)		Lead role, executive producer		Lead role	Lead role	Supporting role					Todd Phillips (director), Jason Bateman, Matt Walsh, Terry Crews, Patton Oswalt
Envy (2004)	Lead role	Lead role									Amy Poehler, Christopher Walken
Around the World in 80 Days (2004)			Minor role	Minor role							Steve Coogan, Rob Schneider, Will Forte
Dodgeball: A True Underdog Story (2004)		Lead role			Lead role, producer						Christine Taylor, Jason Bateman, Hank Azaria
Anchorman: The Legend of Ron Burgundy (2004)	Cameo	Cameo	Minor role		Supporting role	Lead role, writer, executive producer	Lead role	Minor role	Lead role	Lead role	Ian Roberts, Judd Apatow (producer), Fred Willard, Adam McKay (writer, director), Fred Armisen, Kathryn Hahn, Tim Robbins
Wake Up, Ron Burgundy: The Lost Movie (2004)			Minor role		Supporting role	Lead role, writer, executive producer	Lead role	Minor role	Lead role	Lead role	Amy Poehler, Judd Apatow (producer), Fred Willard, Adam McKay (writer, director), Fred Armisen
Meet the Fockers (2004)		Lead role		Minor role							J. P. Manoux
Wedding Crashers (2005)				Lead role	Lead role	Minor role (uncredited)					Christopher Walken, Isla Fisher, Rachel McAdams, Bradley Cooper
Bewitched (2005)						Lead role				Supporting role	Jason Schwartzman
Melinda and Melinda (2005)						Lead role				Minor role	
The 40-Year-Old Virgin (2005)							Supporting role	Supporting role	Minor role	Lead role	Jonah Hill, Jane Lynch, Leslie Mann, Kevin Hart
The Wendell Baker Story (2005)			Lead role, director, writer	Lead role		Minor role					Andrew Wilson
Talladega Nights: The Ballad of Ricky Bobby (2006)						Lead role			Supporting role		Judd Apatow, John C. Reilly, Amy Adams, Molly Shannon, Jane Lynch, Gary Cole, Andy Richter, Rob Riggle, Adam McKay (writer, director)
Tenacious D in The Pick of Destiny (2006)	Lead role, writer, songs	Minor role, producer							Minor role (deleted scene)		Kyle Gass, Amy Poehler, Jason Segel (deleted scene/DVD), Fred Armisen, Tim Robbins
You, Me and Dupree (2006)				Lead role				Supporting role			Matt Dillon
Night at the Museum (2006)		Lead role		Supporting role (uncredited)			Supporting role				Steve Coogan, Robin Williams, Ricky Gervais, Carla Gugino
Blades of Glory (2007)		Producer	Minor role			Lead role					Amy Poehler, Will Arnett, Jenna Fischer
Walk Hard: The Dewey Cox Story (2007)	Cameo (uncredited)						Cameo (uncredited)				John C. Reilly, Judd Apatow (producer), Kristen Wiig, Jonah Hill (uncredited), Jason Schwartzman (uncredited), Justin Long (uncredited)
Knocked Up (2007)							Lead role	Lead role		Cameo (uncredited)	Jonah Hill, Jason Segel, Leslie Mann, Jay Baruchel, Martin Starr
Horton Hears a Who! (2008)								Supporting role		Lead role	Amy Poehler, Will Arnett, Jim Carrey, Jonah Hill
Drillbit Taylor (2008)				Lead role				Co-writer	Minor role		Danny McBride, Leslie Mann, Judd Apatow, Kevin Hart
Get Smart (2008)									Supporting role	Lead role	Anne Hathaway, Dwayne Johnson, Alan Arkin
Kung Fu Panda (2008)	Lead role							Supporting role			David Cross
Tropic Thunder (2008)	Lead role	Lead role, director, writer, producer		Dropped out (originally supporting role)							Steve Coogan, Christine Taylor, Danny McBride, Jay Baruchel, Bill Hader
Over Her Dead Body (2008)				Cameo			Lead role				
Monsters vs. Aliens (2009)							Minor role	Lead role			Reese Witherspoon, Rainn Wilson, Stephen Colbert, Will Arnett, Amy Poehler
Tenure (2009)			Lead role						Minor role		
Night at the Museum: Battle of the Smithsonian (2009)		Lead role		Supporting role							Amy Adams, Steve Coogan, Jonah Hill, Hank Azaria, Robin Williams, Ed Helms, Mindy Kaling, Bill Hader
Year One (2009)	Lead role						Cameo (uncredited)				Hank Azaria, David Cross, Bill Hader
The Goods: Live Hard, Sell Hard (2009)						Producer			Supporting role		Jeremy Piven, Kathryn Hahn, Ed Helms, Tony Hale, Ken Jeong, Craig Robinson, Kristen Schaal, T.J. Miller
Dinner for Schmucks (2010)							Lead role			Lead role	Zach Galifianakis, Jemaine Clement, Chris O'Dowd, Kristen Schaal, Randall Park, Nick Kroll, Alex Borstein
Little Fockers (2010)		Lead role		Lead role							Kevin Hart
Megamind (2010)		Minor role (originally lead role), producer				Lead role					Tina Fey, Jonah Hill, David Cross
How Do You Know (2010)				Lead role			Lead role				Andrew Wilson, Kathryn Hahn, Reese Witherspoon
Kung Fu Panda 2 (2011)	Lead role							Supporting role			David Cross, Danny McBride
The Big Year (2011)	Lead role	Producer		Lead role							Steve Martin, Anthony Anderson, Joel McHale
Fight For Your Right Revisited (2011)	Lead role					Lead role		Lead role			Amy Poehler, Will Arnett
The Watch (2012)		Lead role			Lead role			Co-writer			Jonah Hill, Richard Ayoade
The Internship (2013)				Lead role	Lead role	Minor role					Rose Byrne, Rob Riggle
This Is the End (2013)							Minor role	Lead role, director, writer, producer			James Franco, Jonah Hill, Jay Baruchel, Danny McBride, David Krumholtz, Martin Starr, Jason Segel (uncredited), Kevin Hart
Anchorman 2: The Legend Continues (2013)					Minor role	Lead role, writer	Lead role		Lead role	Lead role	Steve Carell, Adam McKay (writer, director), James Marsden
Night at the Museum: Secret of the Tomb (2014)		Lead role		Supporting role							Steve Coogan, Rebel Wilson, Robin Williams
Kung Fu Panda 3 (2016)	Lead role							Supporting role			David Cross
Zoolander 2 (2016)		Lead role		Lead role		Supporting role					Kristen Wiig, Fred Armisen
Sausage Party (2016)							Supporting role	Lead role, writer, producer			Jonah Hill, James Franco, Danny McBride, David Krumholtz
The Polka King (2017)	Lead role, producer	Executive producer									Jenny Slate, Jason Schwartzman, J.B. Smoove
Brad's Status (2017)		Lead role	Supporting role								Jenna Fischer
Zeroville (2019)						Minor role (uncredited)		Supporting role			James Franco, Craig Robinson, Danny McBride
Queenpins (2021)		Executive producer			Lead role						Kristen Bell, Paul Walter Hauser, Joel McHale, Jack McBrayer
The Shrink Next Door (2021)						Lead role, producer	Lead role, producer				Kathryn Hahn
Chip 'n Dale: Rescue Rangers (2022)	Soundtrack						Cameo	Supporting role			Andy Samberg, Will Arnett, Keegan-Michael Key
Ant-Man and the Wasp: Quantumania (2023)				Cameo (uncredited)			Lead role				Bill Murray
The Super Mario Bros. Movie (2023)	Lead role							Supporting role			Chris Pratt, Charlie Day, Keegan-Michael Key, Sebastian Maniscalco, Fred Armisen
Teenage Mutant Ninja Turtles: Mutant Mayhem (2023)							Supporting role	Supporting role, writer, producer			Rose Byrne
Kung Fu Panda 4 (2024)	Lead role							Cameo (uncredited)			Awkwafina, Ronny Chieng
Despicable Me 4 (2024)						Supporting role				Lead role	Kristen Wiig, Stephen Colbert
Dear Santa (2024)	Lead role, producer	Cameo (uncredited)									Keegan-Michael Key
Anaconda (2025)	Lead role						Lead role				Steve Zahn, Thandiwe Newton
Focker-in-Law (2026)		Lead role, producer		Supporting role							

== See also ==
- Rat Pack
- Brit Pack
- Brat Pack
- Splat Pack
- Generation X
- American Eccentric Cinema
