= Orange County (soundtrack) =

Orange County: The Soundtrack

Soundtrack album by Various Artists
- Released: December 18, 2001
- Length: 55:17
- Label: Columbia; Sony Music Soundtrax

Singles from Orange County: The Soundtrack
- 1. "Defy You" Released: December 18, 2001; 2. "The One" Released: March 18, 2002

Professional ratings
Review scores
Source	Rating
AllMusic	2.5/5 stars

Orange County The Soundtrack is the soundtrack to the 2002 film of the same name starring Jack Black and Colin Hanks. The album features new releases by Foo Fighters ("The One") and The Offspring ("Defy You") along with songs by Crazy Town and Brian Wilson, among others. The first pressings had an extra album with four songs by up-and-coming artists. The album peaked at number 62 on the Billboard 200, and at number 6 on the Top Soundtracks chart.

== Track listing ==
No.	Title	Artist	Length
1.	"Defy You"	The Offspring	3:48
2.	"Story of My Life" (live)	Social Distortion	4:51
3.	"The One"	Foo Fighters	2:44
4.	"Shadow Stabbing"	Cake	3:07
5.	"Butterfly"	Crazy Town	3:37
6.	"1st Time"	Bad Ronald	3:29
7.	"Lay Down Burden"	Brian Wilson	3:45
8.	"Everything's Cool"	Lit	3:10
9.	"Glad That It's Over"	12 Rods	4:35
10.	"Stick 'Em Up"	Quarashi	3:24
11.	"Lose You"	Pete Yorn	4:36
12.	"Under The Tracks"	Creeper Lagoon	4:17
13.	"Love and Mercy"	Brian Wilson	3:13
14.	"California"	Phantom Planet	3:14
15.	"Hello" (hidden track)	Sugarbomb	3:27

Extra album
No.	Title	Artist	Length
1.	"O.C. Life"	Zebrahead	3:00
2.	"Radio #2"	The Ataris	3:21
3.	"I Feel Fine"	Riddlin' Kids	2:39
4.	"Love Ain't No Friend of Mine"	Ill Kidd
