= Bad Ronald (disambiguation) =

Bad Ronald is a 1974 American television thriller film.

Bad Ronald may also refer to:

- Bad Ronald (novel), a novel by Jack Vance, from which the film was adapted
- Bad Ronald (band), an American rap-rock band
- Bad Ronald (album), a 2001 album by the band
