= Defy You =

Single by the Offspring

from the album Orange County: The Soundtrack
- Released: December 18, 2001
- Recorded: 2000
- Genre: Alternative rock
- Length: 3:48
- Label: Columbia
- Songwriter: Dexter Holland
- Producer: Brendan O'Brien

The Offspring singles chronology
"Million Miles Away" (2001)	"Defy You" (2001)	"Hit That" (2003)

"Defy You" is a song by American punk rock band the Offspring. It was recorded, along with its own music video, in 2001 after the release of their album Conspiracy of One for the movie Orange County. The song was also released as a single in December 2001.

Despite early claims that the song would appear on the next Offspring album at the time (which would become Splinter), it was never released on any of their albums, and only appears on their Greatest Hits compilation. However, an acoustic version was released on the Japanese edition of Splinter.

The song was also the final single featuring Ron Welty on drums.

== Music video ==
The band playing outside of the shop.

The music video for the song was recorded in November 2001, directed by David Meyers (who also directed the video for "Original Prankster"), and debuted on MTV on December 8. It is mostly a performance video of the band playing in front of a convenience store where various events relevant to the song's title take place.

At the start of the video a suspicious man steals items from the store. Suddenly the police start running towards the man and he panics, only for them to tackle another man, thus allowing the thief to escape. He then walks past two dogs – one big and one small. The small dog barks down the bigger one. During the instrumental bridge, singer Dexter Holland walks into the store and buys water before rejoining the band outside. After other events, the video ends with a group of nerds being teased by bullies. In keeping with the song's theme, they respond violently and are eventually left alone. The police turn up and tell both sides to settle down. The video soon after fades to black.

=== DVD appearances ===
The music video also appears on the Complete Music Video Collection DVD. It was released in 2005.

== Track listing ==
=== Australia CD Maxi ===
No.	Title	Length
1.	"Defy You"	3:50
2.	"One Hundred Punks" (Generation X cover)	3:14
3.	"Self Esteem" (Live)	4:17
4.	"Want You Bad" (Live)	3:23

=== Promo CD ===
No.	Title	Length
1.	"Defy You"	3:48

== Charts ==
Chart performance for "Defy You"
Chart (2001–2002)	Peak position
Australia (ARIA)	54
Austria (Ö3 Austria Top 40)	54
Germany (GfK)	62
Italy (FIMI)	17
Quebec (ADISQ)	27
Switzerland (Schweizer Hitparade)	52
US Billboard Hot 100	77
US Mainstream Rock (Billboard)	8
US Alternative Airplay (Billboard)	8
