= Ben Stiller =

American actor, comedian, and filmmaker (born 1965)

- Stiller in 2026
- Born: Benjamin Edward Meara Stiller; November 30, 1965 (age 60); New York City, U.S.
- Occupations: Actor; comedian; writer; producer; director
- Years active: 1975–present
- Works: Full list
- Spouse: Christine Taylor (m. 2000)
- Children: 2
- Parents: Jerry Stiller (father); Anne Meara (mother)
- Awards: Full list

Benjamin Edward Meara Stiller (born November 30, 1965) is an American actor, comedian, and filmmaker. Known for his blend of slapstick humor and sharp wit, Stiller rose to fame in the late 1990s with a group of comedic actors colloquially known as the Frat Pack. His films have grossed more than $2.6 billion in Canada and the United States. His accolades include an Emmy Award, a Directors Guild of America Award, a Britannia Award and a Teen Choice Award.

Stiller is the son of the comedians and actors Jerry Stiller and Anne Meara. He began his career writing mockumentaries and was offered a variety sketch series, The Ben Stiller Show, which he produced and hosted for its 13-episode run. The series ran on MTV in 1990, and on Fox in 1992 and 1993, earning him a Primetime Emmy Award for Outstanding Writing for a Variety Series.

Stiller gained stardom with leading roles in several successful comedy films, including There's Something About Mary (1998), Zoolander (2001), Along Came Polly (2004), Dodgeball: A True Underdog Story (2004), Starsky & Hutch (2004), Tropic Thunder (2008), and Tower Heist (2011). He also led franchises such as the Meet the Parents films (2000–present), the Madagascar franchise (2005–2012), and the Night at the Museum films (2006–2014). His dramatic films include Flirting with Disaster (1996), The Royal Tenenbaums (2001), and the Noah Baumbach films Greenberg (2010), While We're Young (2014), and The Meyerowitz Stories (2017).

As a director, Stiller made his feature debut with Reality Bites (1994) and has since directed and starred in the films The Cable Guy (1996), Tropic Thunder, The Secret Life of Walter Mitty (2013), and Zoolander 2 (2016). Since the mid-2010s, Stiller has primarily worked as a television director and showrunner. In 2018, he directed the Showtime limited series Escape at Dannemora, earning a Directors Guild of America Award and two Primetime Emmy Award nominations for Outstanding Limited Series and Outstanding Directing for a Limited Series. Since 2022, he has directed and executive produced the Apple TV series Severance, earning four Primetime Emmy Award nominations.

== Early life and education ==
Benjamin Edward Meara Stiller was born on November 30, 1965, in New York City and raised on the Upper West Side of Manhattan. His father, comedian and actor Jerry Stiller, was born to Ashkenazi Jewish parents that had emigrated from Galicia in Poland. His mother, actress and comedian Anne Meara, who was from an Irish Catholic background, converted to Reform Judaism after marrying his father. While they "were never a very religious family", they celebrated both Hanukkah and Christmas, and Stiller had a bar mitzvah.

His parents frequently took him on the sets of their appearances, including The Mike Douglas Show when he was 6. He considered his childhood unusual, stating: "In some ways, it was a show-business upbringing—a lot of traveling, a lot of late nights—not what you'd call traditional." His older sister, Amy, has appeared in many of his productions, including Reality Bites, Dodgeball: A True Underdog Story, and Zoolander. Stiller displayed an early interest in filmmaking and made Super 8 movies with his sister and friends.

At age 9, Stiller made his acting debut as a guest on his mother's short-lived television series, Kate McShane. In the late 1970s, he performed with the New York City troupe NYC's First All Children's Theater, playing several roles, including the title role in Clever Jack and the Magic Beanstalk. After being inspired by the television show Second City Television while in high school, Stiller realized that he wanted to get involved with sketch comedy. During his high school years, he was also the drummer of the post-punk band Capital Punishment, which released the studio album Roadkill in 1982. The band's bassist, Peter Swann, went on to become a judge on the Arizona Court of Appeals, serving from 2008 until 2022. The band reunited in 2018 to release a new EP, titled This is Capital Punishment, for Record Store Day. The current status of the band is unknown.

Stiller attended The Cathedral School of St. John the Divine and graduated from the Calhoun School in New York in 1983. He started performing on the cabaret circuit as opening act to the cabaret siren Jadin Wong. Stiller then enrolled as a film student at the University of California, Los Angeles. After nine months, Stiller left school to move back to New York City. He made his way through acting classes, auditioning and trying to find an agent.

== Career ==
=== 1986–1995: Early work and The Ben Stiller Show ===
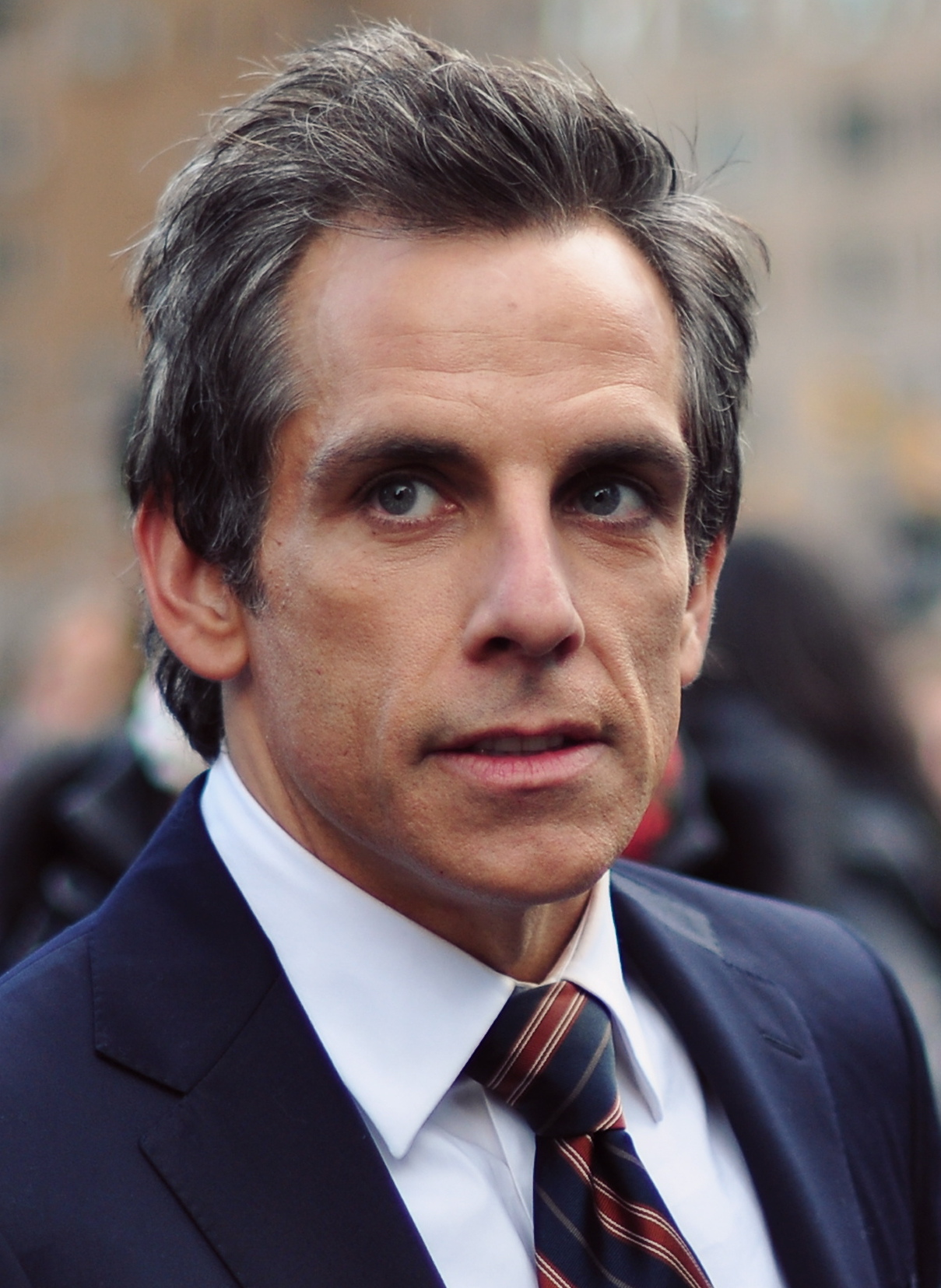
Stiller in 2010

When he was approximately 15, Stiller obtained a small part with one line on the television soap opera Guiding Light, although in an interview he characterized his performance as poor. He was later cast in a role in the 1986 Broadway revival of John Guare's The House of Blue Leaves, alongside John Mahoney; the production would garner four Tony Awards.

During its run, Stiller produced a satirical mockumentary whose principal was fellow actor Mahoney. Stiller's comedic work was well received by the cast and crew of the play, and he followed up with a 10-minute short titled The Hustler of Money, a parody of the Martin Scorsese film The Color of Money. The film featured him in a send-up of Tom Cruise's character and Mahoney in the Paul Newman role, only this time as a bowling hustler instead of a pool shark. The short got the attention of Saturday Night Live, which aired it in 1987 and two years later offered Stiller a spot as a writer. In the meantime, he had a bit role in Steven Spielberg's Empire of the Sun.

In 1989, Stiller wrote for and appeared on Saturday Night Live as a featured performer. However, since the show did not want him to make more short films, he left after four episodes. He then put together Elvis Stories, a short film about a fictitious tabloid focused on recent sightings of Elvis Presley. The film starred friends and co-stars John Cusack, Jeremy Piven, Mike Myers, Andy Dick, and Jeff Kahn. The film was considered a success, and led him to develop the short film Going Back to Brooklyn for MTV; it was a music video starring comedian Colin Quinn that parodied LL Cool J's recent hit "Going Back to Cali". Producers at MTV were so impressed with Back to Brooklyn that they offered Stiller a 13-episode show in the experimental "vid-com" format. Titled The Ben Stiller Show, this 1990 series mixed comedy sketches with music videos and parodied various television shows, music stars, and films. It starred Stiller, along with main writer Kahn and Harry O'Reilly, with his parents and sister making occasional appearances.

Although the show was canceled after its first season, it led to another show (also titled The Ben Stiller Show), on the Fox Network in 1992. The series aired 12 episodes on Fox, with a 13th unaired episode broadcast by Comedy Central in a later revival. Among the principal writers on The Ben Stiller Show were Stiller and Judd Apatow, with the show featuring the ensemble cast of Stiller, Janeane Garofalo, Andy Dick, and Bob Odenkirk. Both Denise Richards and Jeanne Tripplehorn appeared as extras in various episodes. Throughout its short run, The Ben Stiller Show frequently appeared at the bottom of the ratings, even as it garnered critical acclaim and eventually won an Emmy Award for Outstanding Writing in a Variety or Music Program after its cancellation.

In the early 1990s, Stiller had minor roles in films such as Stella and Highway to Hell as well as a cameo in The Nutt House. In 1992, Stiller was approached to direct Reality Bites, based on a script by Helen Childress. Stiller devoted the next year and a half to rewriting the script with Childress, fundraising, and recruiting cast members for the film. It was eventually released in early 1994, directed by Stiller and featuring him as a co-star. The film was produced by Danny DeVito, who would later direct Stiller's 2003 film Duplex and produce his 2004 film Along Came Polly. Reality Bites debuted as the fifth highest-grossing film over the President Day opening weekend and received mixed reviews.

=== 1995–2009: Film comedy stardom ===
Stiller joined his parents in the family film Heavyweights (1995), in which he played two roles. Following Heavyweights, he had a brief uncredited role in Adam Sandler's Happy Gilmore (1996) where he played Hal L., the sadistic orderly running the nursing home. Next, he had lead roles in If Lucy Fell and Flirting with Disaster, before tackling his next directorial effort with The Cable Guy, which starred Jim Carrey and Matthew Broderick. Stiller once again was featured in his own film, as twins. The film received mixed reviews, but was noted for paying the highest salary for an actor up to that point, as Carrey received $20 million for his work in the film. The film also connected Stiller with future Frat Pack members Jack Black and Owen Wilson.

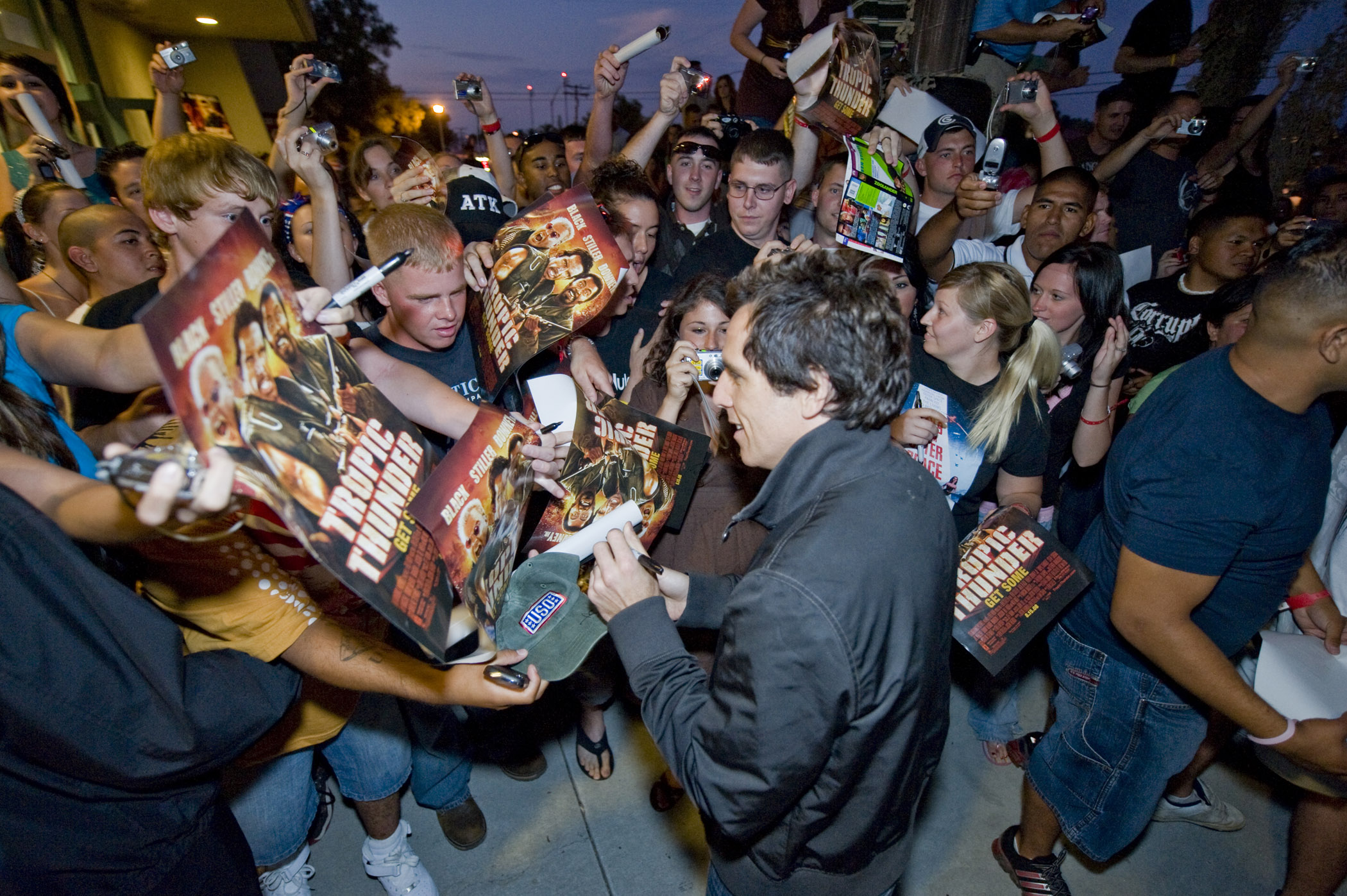
Stiller signing autographs before a screening for Tropic Thunder at Camp Pendleton in August 2008

Also in 1996, MTV invited Stiller to host the VH1 Fashion Awards. Along with Saturday Night Live writer Drake Sather, Stiller developed a short film for the awards about a male model known as Derek Zoolander. It was so well received that he developed another short film about the character for the 1997 VH1 Fashion Awards and eventually remade the skit into a film. In 1998, Stiller put aside his directing ambitions to star in the Farrelly Brothers' There's Something About Mary, alongside Cameron Diaz, which became a surprise hit with a long-lasting cult following. That year, he starred in several dramas, including Zero Effect, Your Friends & Neighbors, and Permanent Midnight. He was invited to take part in hosting the MTV Video Music Awards, for which he developed a parody of the Backstreet Boys and performed a sketch with his father, commenting on his current career. In 1999, he starred in three films, including Mystery Men, where he played a superhero wannabe called Mr. Furious. He appeared in a segment on the July 26 episode of WWF's RAW is WAR to promote the then-upcoming movie and found himself on the wrong end of Intercontinental Champion Jeff Jarrett's Figure-4 Leg Lock. He returned to directing with a new spoof television series for Fox titled Heat Vision and Jack, starring Jack Black. However, the show was not picked up by Fox after its pilot episode and the series was cancelled. Stiller co-wrote a comedic New York Times bestseller with Garofalo in 1999, titled Feel This Book: An Essential Guide to Self-Empowerment, Spiritual Supremacy, and Sexual Satisfaction, a spoof of the self-help books prevalent at the time.

In 2000, Stiller starred in three more films, including one of his most recognizable roles, a male nurse named Gaylord "Greg" Focker in Meet the Parents, opposite Robert De Niro. The film was well received by critics, grossed over $330 million worldwide, and spawned two sequels. Also in 2000, MTV again invited Stiller to make another short film, and he developed Mission: Improbable, a spoof of Tom Cruise's role in Mission: Impossible II and other films. In 2001, Stiller directed his third feature film, Zoolander, in which he also starred as Derek Zoolander. The film featured multiple cameos from a variety of celebrities, including Donald Trump, Paris Hilton, Lenny Kravitz, Heidi Klum, and David Bowie, among others. The film was banned in Malaysia (as the plot centered on an assassination attempt of a Malaysian prime minister), while shots of the World Trade Center were digitally removed and hidden for the film's release after the September 11 terrorist attacks. After Stiller worked with Wilson in Zoolander, they joined forces again for The Royal Tenenbaums. Over the next two years, Stiller continued with a starring role in the film Duplex, and cameos in Orange County and Nobody Knows Anything!. He has guest-starred on several television shows, including an appearance in an episode of the television series The King of Queens, in a flashback as the father of the character Arthur (played by Jerry Stiller). He also made a guest appearance on WWE Raw.

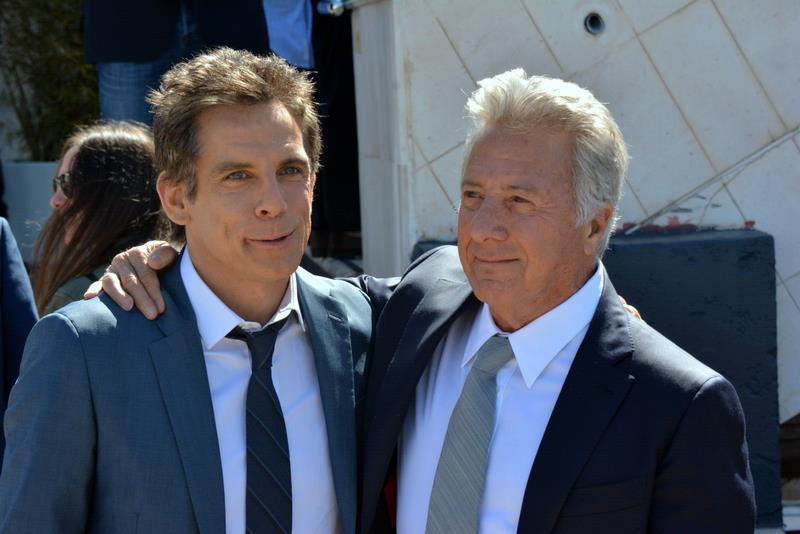
Stiller with Dustin Hoffman, 2017

In 2004, Stiller appeared in six different films, all of which were comedies, and include some of his highest-grossing films: Starsky & Hutch, Envy (which he co-starred with Black in), Dodgeball: A True Underdog Story, Anchorman: The Legend of Ron Burgundy (in which he had an uncredited cameo), Along Came Polly, and Meet the Fockers (a sequel to Meet the Parents). While the critical flop Envy only grossed $14.5 million, the most successful film of these was Meet the Fockers, which grossed over $516.6 million worldwide. He also made extended guest appearances on Curb Your Enthusiasm and Arrested Development in the same year. He appeared on shows such as Friends and Extras, the latter of which earned him a Primetime Emmy Award for Outstanding Guest Actor in a Comedy Series nomination. In 2005, Stiller appeared in Madagascar, which was his first experience as a voice actor in an animated film. Madagascar was a massive worldwide hit, and spawned the sequels Madagascar: Escape 2 Africa in 2008 and Madagascar 3: Europe's Most Wanted in 2012.

In 2006, Stiller had cameo roles in School for Scoundrels and Tenacious D in The Pick of Destiny; he was executive producer of the latter. In December 2006, he had the lead role in Night at the Museum. Although not a critical favorite, it earned over $115 million in ten days. In 2007, Stiller starred alongside Malin Åkerman in the romantic comedy The Heartbreak Kid. The film earned over $100 million worldwide despite receiving mostly negative reviews. In 2008, Stiller directed, co-wrote, co-produced, and starred in the film Tropic Thunder, with Robert Downey Jr. and Black; Stiller had originally conceived of the film's premise while filming Empire of the Sun in 1987. In 2009, he starred with Amy Adams in Night at the Museum 2: Battle of the Smithsonian, a sequel to Night at the Museum.

=== 2010–2019: Dramatic roles and other work ===
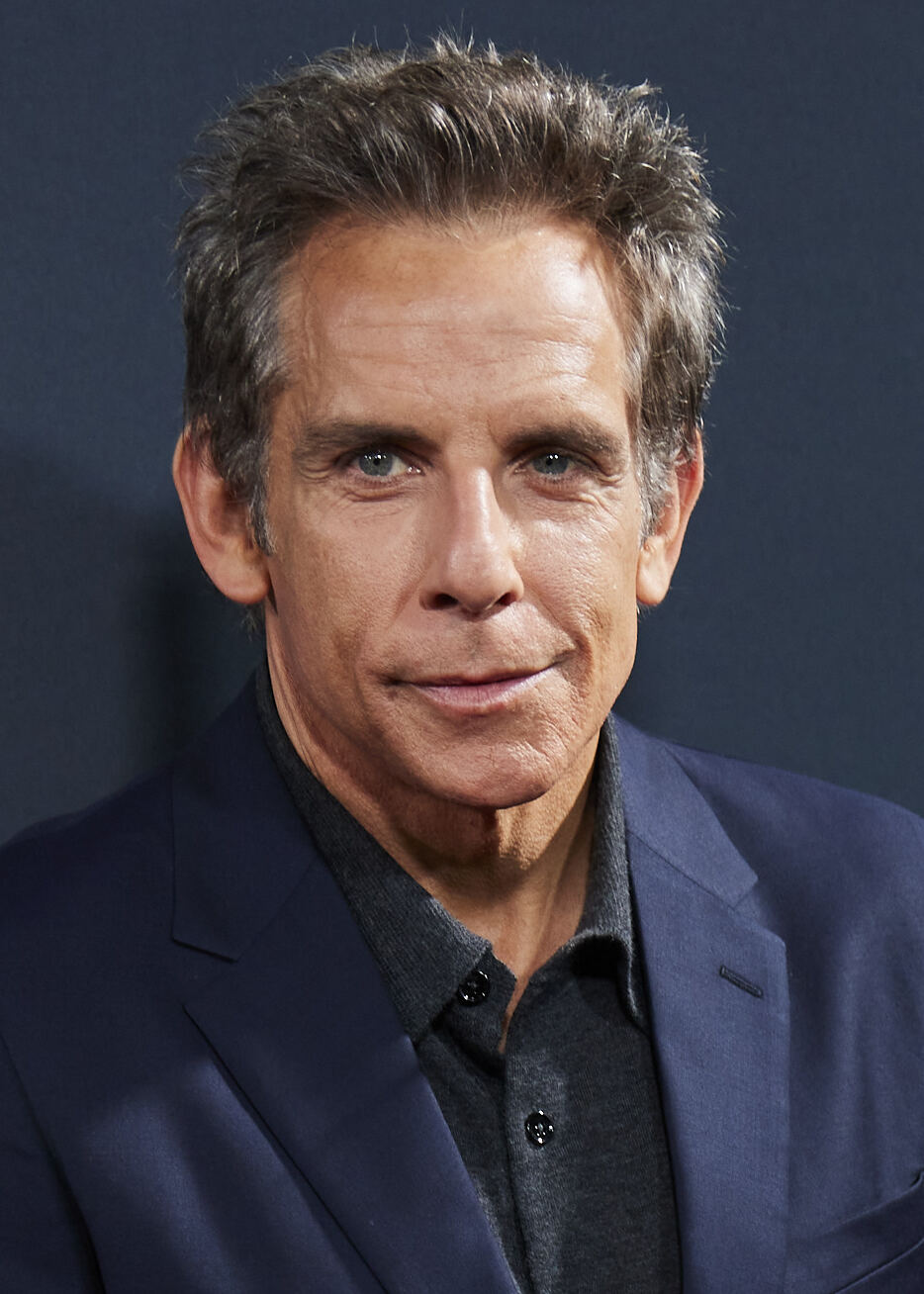
Stiller in the 2024 Toronto International Film Festival.

In 2010, Stiller made a brief cameo in Joaquin Phoenix's mockumentary I'm Still Here. That same year played the lead role in the Noah Baumbach directed comedy-drama Greenberg (2010) acting opposite Greta Gerwig. In the film he portrays a man going through a mid-life crisis, a role which earned him a nomination for the Independent Spirit Award for Best Male Lead. He again portrayed Greg Focker in the critically panned but financially successful Little Fockers, the second sequel to Meet the Parents. He originally had planned to voice the titular protagonist of Megamind along with Downey, but later dropped out and was replaced by Will Ferrell while still remaining an executive producer and voicing a minor character in the film, a museum curator named Bernard. Stiller starred with Eddie Murphy and Alan Alda in Tower Heist (2011), about a group of maintenance workers planning a heist in a residential skyscraper.

He produced, directed, and starred as the title role in the adventure dramedy The Secret Life of Walter Mitty based off the 1947 film of the same name which was released in 2013. The film received mixed reviews, but praise for Stiller's direction and was chosen by the National Board of Review as one of the top ten films of 2013. The following year he reunited with director Noah Baumbach for the coming-of-age comedy-drama While We're Young (2014) acting opposite Naomi Watts, Amanda Seyfried, and Adam Driver. Todd McCarthy of The Hollywood Reporter compared his performance to that of Woody Allen in his review from the 2014 Toronto International Film Festival. In 2014, he starred in Night at the Museum: Secret of the Tomb, the second sequel to Night at the Museum.

Stiller then starred in and directed the comedy sequel Zoolander 2 (2016), which was a critical failure. The following year made his third collaboration with Baumbach in the Netflix family dramedy The Meyerowitz Stories alongside Adam Sandler, Elizabeth Marvel, Emma Thompson and Dustin Hoffman. The film premiered at the 2017 Cannes Film Festival where Peter Bradshaw of The Guardian wrote, "Stiller ups his acting game very considerably, breaking through his habitually rather opaque, impassive irony with something very emotional". That same year he also starred in the independent film Brad's Status (2017) directed by Mike White. Film critic Christy Lemire of Rogerebert.com wrote that White gives "Stiller a juicy role that’s sharply funny and surprisingly poignant."

Stiller's next directorial project was the Showtime miniseries Escape at Dannemora (2018) starring Benicio del Toro, Paul Dano, and Patricia Arquette. For his work, he received the Directors Guild of America Award for Outstanding Directorial Achievement in Movies for Television and Limited Series as well as two Primetime Emmy Award nominations for Outstanding Limited Series and Primetime Emmy Award for Outstanding Directing for a Limited Series or Movie. From 2018 to 2019, Stiller played Donald Trump's associate Michael Cohen on Saturday Night Live across six episodes, including in a memorable cold open with Robert De Niro playing former FBI Director Robert Mueller.

=== 2020–present: Severance and streaming projects ===
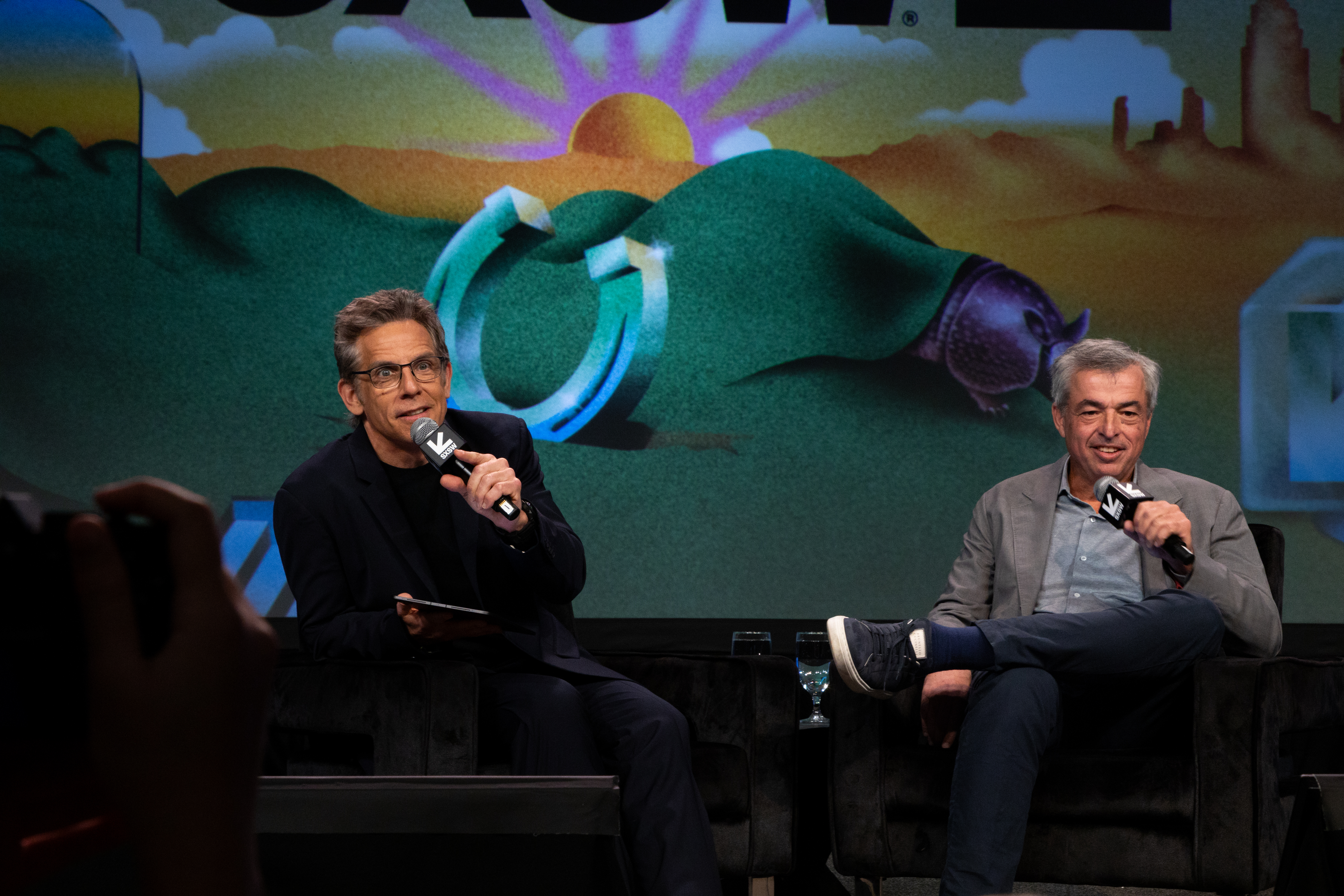
Stiller and Eddy Cue discussing Severance at SXSW 2025

In 2021, Stiller signed on to co-write and direct Bag Man, a Focus Features adaptation of the 2018 podcast about the kickback scandal that led to the resignation of Vice President Spiro Agnew. As of October 2023, the movie remained in pre-production. The filming was scheduled to start in Washington, DC and Budapest in November 2025. Stiller executive produces and directs many episodes of the Apple TV+ series Severance starring Adam Scott, Britt Lower, Tramell Tillman, and John Turturro which premiered in 2022. He earned Primetime Emmy Award nominations for Outstanding Drama Series and Outstanding Directing for a Drama Series in 2022 and 2025.

In 2024, Stiller made his acting comeback after seven years with the holiday films Nutcrackers and Dear Santa, the latter also featuring Black and having Stiller in an uncredited role. While promoting the films, Stiller appeared on the popular interview show Hot Ones. In 2024, it was announced that Stiller and De Niro were in talks to star in a fourth Meet the Parents film. In December 2024, Stiller was featured in a music video trailer for singer SZA's new album Lana, singing her song "Drive".

Stiller reprised his role as Hal L. in Happy Gilmore 2, a sequel to Happy Gilmore that premiered on July 25, 2025. He was confirmed to appear in The Dink (2025), a comedy film about the sport of pickleball directed by Josh Greenbaum and co-produced with Stiller.

== "Frat Pack" ==
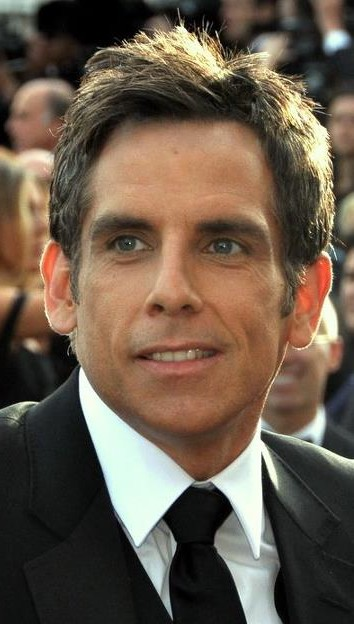
Stiller at the Madagascar 3 premiere at the 2012 Cannes Film Festival

Stiller has been described as the "acknowledged leader" of the Frat Pack, a core group of actors who have worked together in multiple films. The group includes Jack Black, Will Ferrell, Vince Vaughn, Owen Wilson, Luke Wilson, Steve Carell, and Paul Rudd. Stiller has been acknowledged as the leader of the group because of his multiple cameos and for his consistent use of the other members in roles in films which he produces and directs. He has appeared the most with Wilson (in 12 films). Of the 35 primary films that are considered Frat Pack films, Stiller has been involved with 20 in some capacity.

Stiller is also the only member of this group to have appeared in a Brat Pack film (Fresh Horses). He rejects the "Frat Pack" label, saying in a 2008 interview that the concept was "completely fabricated".

== Personal life ==
Stiller dated several actresses during his early television and film career, including Jeanne Tripplehorn between 1990 and 1996, Calista Flockhart, and Amanda Peet.

In May 2000, Stiller married actress Christine Taylor at an oceanfront ceremony in Kauai, Hawaii. The two had met in 1999, while filming a never-broadcast television pilot for Fox called Heat Vision and Jack. Taylor and Stiller appeared together in the films Zoolander, Dodgeball: A True Underdog Story, Tropic Thunder, Zoolander 2 and in the television series Arrested Development and Curb Your Enthusiasm. Both adopted a vegetarian diet for health reasons. After 17 years of marriage, Taylor and Stiller separated in 2017. They later reconciled after living together during the COVID-19 pandemic lockdown. The couple lives in Westchester County, New York and Manhattan, New York and have two children, a daughter, Ella Olivia (born 2002), and a son, Quinlin "Quinn" Dempsey (born 2005). Stiller and Taylor's daughter, Ella, graduated from the Juilliard School in New York City, New York with a degree in acting on May 24, 2024.

Stiller is a fan of the New York Knicks basketball team, and is frequently seen at Madison Square Garden attending games.

In September 2025, Stiller launched a soda brand named Stiller's Soda which is available in New York City.

=== Philanthropy and advocacy ===
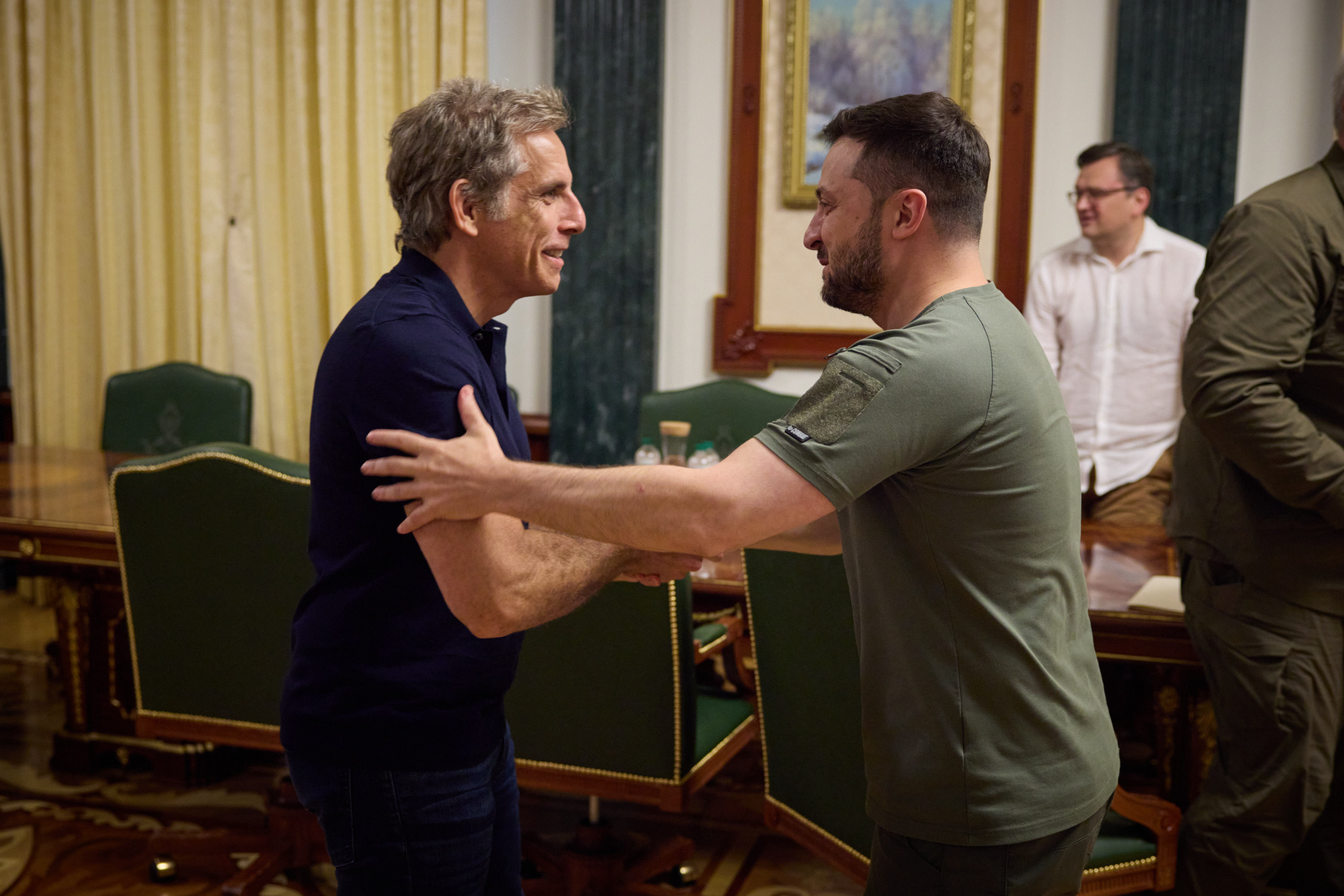
Stiller meeting with Ukraine President Volodymyr Zelenskyy in 2022

In 2001, Stiller appeared as a celebrity contestant on the game show Who Wants to Be a Millionaire. He won $32,000 for his charity Project ALS, after incorrectly answering his $250,000 question in an attempt to equal Edie Falco's $250,000 win.

Stiller supports such charities as Declare Yourself, the Elizabeth Glaser Pediatric AIDS Foundation, and the Starlight Starbright Children's Foundation. He was appointed Goodwill Ambassador for UNHCR on July 2, 2018.

Stiller frequently impersonates such performers as Bono, Tom Cruise, Bruce Springsteen, and David Blaine. In an interview with Parade, he commented that Robert Klein, George Carlin, and Jimmie Walker were inspirations for his comedy career. Stiller is also a self-professed Trekkie and appeared in the television special Star Trek: 30 Years and Beyond to express his love of the show, as well as a comedy roast for William Shatner. He frequently refers to the show in his work, and named his production company Red Hour Productions after a time of day in the original series episode, "The Return of the Archons".

Stiller considers Ukrainian President Volodymyr Zelenskyy to be his "hero", and he visited him in Kyiv in June 2022; on the same trip Stiller visited Lviv, Irpin and Makariv to bring attention to the humanitarian need of refugees in Poland and Ukraine. Russia sanctioned Stiller over his Ukraine support.

In 2024, Stiller spoke out about his opinions on the Gaza war on a Time magazine article. In the article, Stiller speaks about his Polish and Jewish heritage, and advocates for a two state solution by explaining his solidarity with both the Israeli and Palestinian citizens, as well as criticizing the Israeli government and Hamas.

=== Politics ===
Stiller is a supporter of the Democratic Party and donated money to John Kerry's 2004 U.S. presidential campaign.

In February 2007, Stiller attended a fundraiser for Barack Obama and later donated to the 2008 U.S. presidential campaigns of Obama, John Edwards, and Hillary Clinton.

Stiller supported vice president Kamala Harris in the 2024 election.

=== Health ===
There have been false reports about Stiller's mental health based on a joke he made during a 1999 GQ interview. In 2011 and 2018, Stiller clarified in interviews with The Hollywood Reporter and The Times, stating that he does not have bipolar disorder. He mentioned that his original comment was taken out of context and mistakenly presented as factual by the reporter.

Stiller was diagnosed with prostate cancer in June 2014 and was declared cancer-free in September 2014 following the surgical removal of his prostate.

== Filmography and accolades ==
Stiller has mostly appeared in comedy films. He was awarded the Primetime Emmy Award for Outstanding Writing for a Variety, Music or Comedy Program for his work on The Ben Stiller Show. He has been nominated twelve times for the Teen Choice Awards, and won once, for "Choice Hissy Fit" for his work in Zoolander. He has been nominated for the MTV Movie Awards thirteen times, and has won three times: for "Best Fight" in There's Something About Mary, "Best Comedic Performance" in Meet the Parents, and "Best Villain" in DodgeBall: A True Underdog Story. He received the MTV Movie Awards' MTV Generation Award, the ceremony's top honor, in 2009. On March 31, 2007, Stiller received the "Wannabe Award" (given to a celebrity whom children "want to be" like) at the Kids' Choice Awards.

Princeton University's Class of 2005 inducted Stiller as an honorary member of the class during its "Senior Week" in April 2005. On February 23, 2007, Stiller received the Hasty Pudding Man of the Year award from Harvard's Hasty Pudding Theatricals. According to the organization, the award is given to performers who give a lasting and impressive contribution to the world of entertainment. In 2011, the BAFTA presented Stiller the Britannia Award for Excellence in Comedy. In 2014, he was nominated for Best Actor at the 40th Saturn Awards for The Secret Life of Walter Mitty. On February 2, 2019, Stiller won the Directors Guild of America Award for Outstanding Directorial Achievement in Movies for Television and Limited Series for his miniseries, Escape at Dannemora.

On February 6, 2016, Stiller set the Guinness World Record for longest selfie stick (8.56 meters) at the World Premiere of Zoolander 2.

== See also ==
- List of Primetime Emmy Award winners
