= Bad Ronald (album) =

Studio album by Bad Ronald
- Released: September 11, 2001
- Genre: Rap rock
- Length: 47:35
- Label: Reprise Records
- Producer: David Kahne

Bad Ronald is the first and only studio album by American rap-rock band Bad Ronald. It was released on September 11, 2001 by Warner Bros. Records.

== Track listing ==
1. "Let's Begin (Shoot the Sh**)"
2. "Bad Idea"
3. "All a Dream"
4. "I Need Love"
5. "Delivery"
6. "Hand on the Wheel"
7. "Lost on Tour"
8. "1st Time"
9. "Jamie"
10. "EZ Decision"
11. "Popcorn T******"
12. "Imagine"
13. "My Two Sense"
14. "Bank"
15. "Let's Begin (Shoot the Sh**) (Rock Remix)"
16. "American Way"
