= Dodgeball: A True Underdog Story =

2004 sports comedy film by Rawson Thurber

- Theatrical release poster
- Directed by: Rawson Marshall Thurber
- Written by: Rawson Marshall Thurber
- Produced by: Ben Stiller; Stuart Cornfeld
- Starring: Vince Vaughn; Ben Stiller; Christine Taylor; Rip Torn
- Cinematography: Jerzy Zieliński
- Edited by: Alan Baumgarten; Peter Teschner
- Music by: Theodore Shapiro
- Production company: Red Hour Productions
- Distributed by: 20th Century Fox
- Release date: June 18, 2004
- Running time: 92 minutes
- Countries: Germany; United States
- Language: English
- Budget: $20 million
- Box office: $168.4 million

Dodgeball: A True Underdog Story (stylized as DodgeBall: a TRUE underdog story) is a 2004 sports comedy film written and directed by Rawson Marshall Thurber, in his directorial debut, and starring Vince Vaughn, Ben Stiller, Christine Taylor, and Rip Torn. The film follows a group of unlikely misfits who enter a Las Vegas dodgeball tournament, needing the prize money to save their cherished gym from being taken over by a corporate health fitness chain.

Theatrically released by 20th Century Fox on June 18, 2004, the film received generally positive reviews from critics and grossed $168.4 million on a $20 million budget.

As of 2023, a sequel was in development.

== Plot ==
Peter LaFleur is the owner of Average Joe's, a small, dilapidated and understaffed gym. When he defaults on the gym's mortgage, his cocky and vindictive business rival White Goodman, who owns the high-end Globo Gym across the street, purchases it. Unless Peter can raise $50,000 in 30 days, Goodman will foreclose on and demolish Average Joe's to build a new auxiliary parking structure for his members. Goodman attempts to seduce attorney Kate Veatch, who is handling his account; disgusted, she cites conflict of interest (COI) to rebuff his disturbing advances.

Peter, gym employees Dwight Baumgarten and Owen Dittman, and members Steve "The Pirate" Cowan, Justin Redman and Gordon Pibb, all decide to raise the required money. After an impromptu car wash suggested by Owen fails, Gordon suggests entering a dodgeball tournament in Las Vegas with a $50,000 grand prize. Justin obtains a 1950s-era training film for the group featuring Irish-American dodgeball legend Patches O'Houlihan. A Girl Scout Troop easily defeats them at the sub-regional qualifiers the following day, but are disqualified due to one member failing a drug test, resulting in Average Joe's winning by default.

Having spied on Average Joe's using a hidden camera in a cutout of himself, Goodman forms his own dodgeball team, the Globo Gym Purple Cobras, and surprises Gordon by revealing he bypassed the mandatory qualification match due to his friendship with the chancellor. After watching their confrontation, Patches, now elderly and using a wheelchair, approaches Peter, volunteering to coach the team. Patches' unusual training regimen involves having them dodge wrenches, oncoming cars, and his constant insults. Kate demonstrates her skills at the sport but declines to join the team, citing COI.

Goodman arrives at Kate's house uninvited and reveals that he misled her boss about her stealing and drinking on the job, thus getting her fired from her law firm and freeing him to date her. Instead, she rejects Goodman and joins the Average Joe's team.

Despite early setbacks, the team advances to the final round against Globo Gym. The night before the match, a falling sign in the casino kills Patches. Returning to his room, Peter encounters an uninvited Goodman, who greedily offers him $100,000 for the deed to Average Joe's, claiming that Peter will inevitably cause its closure.

Demoralized and anxious that the team will lose without Patches' motivation, Peter chastises Steve for his pirate behavior upon returning to the group, causing Steve's departure. On the day of the final, Justin assists his classmate and love interest Amber in a cheerleading competition after his rival Derek gets severely injured, leaving Average Joe's short of players.

A brief encounter with Lance Armstrong restores Peter's morale, but he and Justin return too late; Average Joe's has already forfeited. After Gordon discovers that a majority of the judges can overturn the forfeiture, a tie-breaking vote from Chuck Norris reinstates the team.

After an intense game, Peter and Goodman engage in a sudden-death match. Inspired by Patches' spirit, Peter blindfolds himself, evades Goodman's throw, and strikes him in the face, winning the championship and the prize money. Goodman deflatingly reveals that Peter sold the gym to him the previous night, but Peter explains he used Goodman's $100,000 to bet on Average Joe's victory; with the odds against them at 50 to 1, he collects $5 million. Peter then announces his intention to invest in the controlling stake of the publicly traded Globo Gym, allowing him to own it and its subsidiaries, which now include Average Joe's, and fire Goodman. Steve returns, appearing more normal, but reverts to his pirate persona when Peter reveals their winnings as "buried treasure". Joyce, a friend of Kate's who flew from Guam to witness the final match, arrives and kisses her passionately, shocking Peter; Kate then reveals her bisexuality and kisses Peter similarly.

During the credits, Peter advertises youth dodgeball classes at a newly renovated and popular Average Joe's. Meanwhile, Goodman, now morbidly obese again, is seen watching the commercial on television, blaming Norris for his plight.

== Cast ==
- Vince Vaughn as Peter LaFleur, the very laid-back and casual owner of Average Joe's Gym whose lack of attention leads to its foreclosure.
- Ben Stiller as White Goodman, the arrogant owner of Globo Gym who is trying to buy out Average Joe's so he can demolish it and build a parking lot for his customers. He used to be morbidly obese back in the 1980s.
- Christine Taylor as Kate Veatch, a very athletic real estate and tax lawyer assigned by the bank to sort out the finances at Average Joe's Gym. She later joins the Average Joe's dodgeball team after losing her job thanks to Goodman, who also pursues a relationship with her, which she constantly rejects.
- Gary Cole as Cotton McKnight, one of the TV announcers for the dodgeball tournament
- Rip Torn as Patches O'Houlihan, a retired seven-time ADAA dodgeball All-Star, now an old man who uses a wheelchair, who coaches the Average Joe's team.
  - Hank Azaria as young Patches
- Missi Pyle as Fran Stalinovskovichdaviddivichski, a professional dodgeball player from Romanovia, playing for the Globo Gym team, and Owen's newfound love interest
- Alan Tudyk as Steve "The Pirate" Cowan, a regular customer at Average Joe's who dresses, talks, and acts like a pirate
- Justin Long as Justin Redman, a high school student and regular customer at Average Joe's
- Stephen Root as Gordon Pibb, a regular customer at Average Joe's
- Chris Williams as Dwight Baumgarten, an employee at Average Joe's
- Joel David Moore as Owen Dittman, an employee at Average Joe's
- Julie Gonzalo as Amber, a cheerleader at Justin's high school with whom he is infatuated, and his future wife
- Jamal Duff as Me'Shell Jones, White Goodman's "Fitness Consigliere" who carries out Goodman's orders
- Jason Bateman as Pepper Brooks, the color commentator for the dodgeball tournament TV broadcast
- Al Kaplon as The Referee
- William Shatner as The Dodgeball Chancellor who oversees the dodgeball tournaments
- Trever O'Brien as Derek, another cheerleader at Justin's high school and Amber's ex-boyfriend
- Rusty Joiner as Blade, a member of the Globo Gym dodgeball team
- Kevin Porter as Lazer, a member of the Globo Gym dodgeball team
- Brandon Molale as Blazer, a member of the Globo Gym dodgeball team
- Curtis Armstrong as Mr. Ralph, a man who hosts the sub-regional qualifiers event
- Scarlett Chorvat as Joyce, Kate's girlfriend
- Lori Beth Denberg as Martha Johnstone, an overweight cheerleader at Justin's high school
- Cayden Boyd as Timmy, a boy in the dodgeball instructional video
- Suzy Nakamura as Gordon's wife
- Bob Cicherillo as Rory (uncredited)
- Patton Oswalt as the following uncredited roles:
  - A video store clerk
  - The narrator of a video that Goodman watches while fondling a piece of pizza

Cameo appearances

- Lance Armstrong as himself, giving Pete a pep talk to motivate him to return to the tournament
- David Hasselhoff as himself, playing the coach of the Blitzkrieg
- Chuck Norris as himself, appearing as a member of the dodgeball judiciary board

== Production ==
Ben Stiller's character, White Goodman, was an intentional copy-and-paste of his character Tony Perkis Jr. from the film Heavyweights. Stiller opted to simply redo his performance believing that no one had seen that film, but learned too late that the movie had a large cult following. He added that Perkis was "definitely a first or second cousin to [Goodman]" and had no regrets over doing an alternate portrayal of him.

When the film was screened to test audiences, the original ending had Average Joe's lose to Globo Gym in the final match. After the ending was viewed negatively by the test audiences, the sudden death match and Average Joe's winning the dodgeball tournament were added alongside White going back to obesity.

== Release ==
=== Copyright lawsuit ===
In 2005, two New York City screenwriters, David Price and Ernando Ashoka Thomas, filed suit in federal court against Fox and Thurber, claiming the copyright of an unproduced screenplay they had written, Dodgeball: The Movie, was infringed upon by Thurber and Fox. They alleged there were a number of similarities in the plots of the two screenplays, and that Thurber may have had access to their screenplay, which was finished a month before his and submitted to an agent whose assistant he was acquainted with. Lawyers for the defendants dismissed some of the allegations as coincidental. They said that both screenplays were the work of writers who used common formulaic elements. Judge Shira Scheindlin denied the defense motion for summary judgment and ordered a jury trial. The suit was later settled out of court.

== Reception ==
=== Box office ===
In its first week, the film grossed over $29 million, and would go on to a domestic gross of $114.3 million, and a worldwide total of $168.4 million.

=== Critical response ===
On the review aggregator website Rotten Tomatoes, 72% of 166 critics' reviews are positive, with an average rating of 6.3/10. The website's consensus reads: "Proudly profane and splendidly silly, Dodgeball is a worthy spiritual successor to the goofball comedies of the 1980s." Metacritic, which uses a weighted average, assigned the film a score of 55 out of 100, based on 34 critics, indicating "mixed or average" reviews. Audiences polled by CinemaScore gave the film an average grade of "B+" on an A+ to F scale.

Slant Magazine dismissed the film as "a less-than-one-joke film", while TV Guide remarked that Ben Stiller "doesn't know when to stop". Other critics, such as The Boston Globe, praised Stiller's satirical take on male virility and praised the chemistry between Vince Vaughn and Christine Taylor. Joe Morgenstern of The Wall Street Journal initially declined to review the film, believing it was not worthy of his time. However, after reviewing the DVD, he changed his view, writing, "Mea culpa, mea culpa. Rawson Marshall Thurber's debut feature, starring Ben Stiller opposite Vince Vaughn, is erratic, imbecilic if not completely idiotic, inconsequential in even the small scheme of things, and thoroughly entertaining". Roger Ebert gave the film a three stars out of four rating in his Chicago Sun-Times review and writes "in a miraculous gift to the audience, 20th Century-Fox does not reveal all of the best gags in its trailer."

=== Accolades ===
- 2004 ESPY Awards
  - Best Sports Movie – Nominated
- 2005 BMI Awards
  - Best Film Music, Theodore Shapiro – Won
- 2005 MTV Movie Awards
  - Best Comedic Performance, Ben Stiller – Nominated
  - Best On-Screen Team (Vince Vaughn, Christine Taylor, Justin Long, Alan Tudyk, Stephen Root, Joel Moore and Chris Williams) – Nominated
  - Best Villain, Ben Stiller – Won
- 25th Golden Raspberry Awards
  - Worst Actor, Ben Stiller (Also for Anchorman: The Legend of Ron Burgundy, Along Came Polly, Envy, and Starsky & Hutch [all 2004]) – Nominated

== Sequel ==
On April 22, 2013, it was announced that 20th Century Fox had started developing a sequel to the film, with Clay Tarver writing the script and Ben Stiller and Vince Vaughn returning to star. However, Ben Stiller later stated that he was not aware a Dodgeball sequel was happening. A reunion video featuring the cast entitled Play Dodgeball with Ben Stiller was released online in June 2017, announcing a competition to raise funds for the Stiller Foundation.

On April 27, 2023, it was announced that 20th Century Studios had once again begun production on a sequel, with actor Vince Vaughn set to return, and possibly serve as a producer on the new film. On April 21, 2025, Vaughn stated that he was "open to it" but that "nothing is for sure".

== ESPN8: The Ocho ==
On August 8, 2017, ESPN paid homage to its lampooned portrayal in Dodgeball by airing a day-long "ESPN8: The Ocho" marathon on its college sports channel ESPNU. In the spirit of the programming depicted in the film, it consisted of lesser-known and unconventional sports and competitions—including trampoline dodgeball, darts, disc golf, kabaddi, and roller derby. The stunt was reprised the following two years on ESPN2, and also included airings of Dodgeball.

Due to a lack of live sports programming during the COVID-19 pandemic, ESPN announced on March 22, 2020, that it would reprise the stunt earlier than scheduled on ESPN2. It did it on May 2, 2020, on ESPN, and then August 8, 2020, on ESPN2 as well as the Big Screen in Fortnite Party Royale. A collection of sports that were featured on ESPN8, as well as the ESPN8 broadcast on these said networks, were available on the ESPN app.

The program was held again on ESPN2 on August 3, 2023. The channel also received a cameo in the 2024 Paramount+ mini-series Knuckles. By 2023, ESPN8 had become a permanent channel, airing as a FAST channel on multiple streaming platforms including The Roku Channel and DirecTV Stream.

== See also ==
- ESPN8 The Ocho
- List of American films of 2004
