= Sugarbomb =

- Origin: Fort Worth, Texas, U.S.
- Genres: Power pop
- Years active: 1998–2009
- Labels: Crystal Clear Sound, RCA, Rainmaker

Sugarbomb was a power pop band from Fort Worth, Texas. After an independent release, Tastes Like Sugar, in 1999, they signed to RCA and released their second album, Bully, in 2001. However, RCA dropped them two weeks after the release. The single "Hello" reached number 34 on the Billboard Adult Top 40 chart. Billboard writer Geoff Mayfield included Bully on his top ten albums list for 2001, writing in a brief summary that the band's name and album art were "silly... But, my, does it rock." The song "Hello" was included in the films Orange County and Van Wilder (both released in 2002). Jason Damas at PopMatters wrote of Sugarbomb, "a damn good sound that rocks hard and is catchy as all hell", comparing them to the Beach Boys, Todd Rundgren, XTC, and Queen.

== Band members ==
- Les Farrington – keyboards, lead vocals
- Daniel Harville – guitar, lead vocals
- Michael Harville – drums, vocals
- Greg Bagby – guitar, vocals
- Kelly Riley – bass

== Albums ==
- Tastes Like Sugar (1999)
- Bully (2001)
