= Envy (2004 film) =

2004 film by Barry Levinson

- Theatrical release poster
- Directed by: Barry Levinson
- Written by: Steve Adams
- Produced by: Barry Levinson; Paula Weinstein
- Starring: Ben Stiller; Jack Black; Rachel Weisz; Amy Poehler; Christopher Walken
- Cinematography: Tim Maurice-Jones
- Edited by: Stu Linder; Blair Daily
- Music by: Mark Mothersbaugh
- Production companies: Castle Rock Entertainment; Baltimore/Spring Creek Pictures
- Distributed by: DreamWorks Pictures (through DreamWorks Distribution LLC; United States and Canada); Columbia Pictures (through Columbia TriStar Film Distributors International; International)
- Release date: April 30, 2004
- Running time: 99 minutes
- Country: United States
- Language: English
- Budget: $20–40 million
- Box office: $14.5 million

Envy is a 2004 American black comedy buddy film directed by Barry Levinson and starring Ben Stiller and Jack Black.

The film was released on April 30, 2004 by DreamWorks Distribution in the United States, with Columbia TriStar Film Distributors International releasing in other territories. This film received generally negative reviews from critics and was a commercial failure, earning $14.5 million at the box office on a $20–$40 million budget.

== Plot ==
Tim Dingman and Nick Vanderpark are best friends, neighbors and co-workers at 3M. Nick is constantly coming up with crazy ideas to get rich quick and when he invents Vapoorize, a spray that instantly disintegrates dog feces, he actually succeeds. As Nick's wealth continues to grow, so does Tim's envy, as he had initially scoffed at the idea and squandered an opportunity to invest and become mega-rich himself. Nick is blissfully unaware of Tim's envy and his generosity only serves to make Tim more envious of him. Meanwhile, Nick's wife Natalie decides to run for the state senate but is continually plagued by questions about her husband's product.

After Tim's wife Debbie and children Lula and Michael temporarily leave and he is fired from 3M, Tim's envy reaches new levels. In a bar, he meets J-Man Goddard, a bizarre drifter, who lends a sympathetic ear and offers advice. After a drunken night out, Tim accidentally shoots Nick's beloved horse, Corky, with a bow and arrow, apparently killing him, and buries the horse in his abandoned swimming pool.

Nick offers a $50,000 reward for the return of Corky. J-Man and Tim concoct a plan whereby J-Man would discover Corky and claim the reward, splitting the proceeds. However, a series of unfortunate events, including Tim's family getting holed up in J-Man's mountain cabin, leads to Corky's carcass being lost in a rainstorm.

Nick reveals to Tim that he is going to Rome for the debut of Vapoorize there and gives Tim the opportunity to join him in a 50/50 partnership, which he accepts. J-Man finds out that Tim is now rich, and, feeling betrayed, tries to blackmail him. After confessing to Debbie, now enjoying her rich lifestyle, Tim agrees to pay J-Man; however, J-Man ups his demands and asks to be Tim's partner. Tim accidentally shoots him in the back with an arrow and J-Man, believing that Tim has tried to kill him, backs down in fear.

Tim eventually confesses all to Nick who forgives him for his jealousy and agrees to continue with the partnership; however, at a press conference for Natalie's electoral campaign (where she promises to withdraw her candidacy if it is proven Vapoorize is harmful to the environment in any way), Corky's body is seen floating down the nearby river. Corky's post-mortem reveals that the horse was not killed by the arrow as previously thought but actually poisoned by a by-product of Vapoorize, used by Tim to treat his garden after Corky came to eat the apples from his tree. The veterinarian Dr. Fernandez informs the pair that she is obliged to notify the Environmental Protection Agency and Vapoorize is immediately pulled from the market. Nick and Tim almost lose all their wealth and glory, until Tim comes up with an invention of his own: Pocket Flan, inspired by Nick's family's love for the dessert. J-Man is shown in the audience of Tim and Nick's infomercial for Pocket Flan, apparently reconciled.

== Cast ==
- Ben Stiller as Tim Dingman
- Jack Black as Nick Vanderpark
- Rachel Weisz as Debbie Dingman
- Amy Poehler as Natalie Vanderpark
- Christopher Walken as J-Man Goddard
- Ariel Gade as Lula Dingman
- Sam Lerner as Michael Dingman
- Blue Deckert as Cal
- Terry Bozeman as Worker
- Tom McCleister as Bosco
- Maricela Ochoa as Dr. Fernandez
- Tara Karsian as Lab Assistant
- Ted Rooney as Auctioneer
- Cayden Boyd as Wolf
- Kent Shocknek as Newscaster

== Reception ==
Envy received generally negative reviews from critics. On Rotten Tomatoes, the film has an approval rating of 8%, based on 118 reviews with an average rating of 3.11/10. The site's critical consensus reads: "Jack Black and Ben Stiller fail to wring laughs from a script that's essentially one extended poop joke." On Metacritic, the film has a score of 31 out of 100, based on 30 critics, indicating "generally unfavorable" reviews. Audiences polled by CinemaScore gave the film an average grade of "D" on an A+ to F scale.

Roger Ebert of the Chicago Sun-Times gave the film two out of four stars. He said: "The movie is funny, yes, but not really funny enough." Variety's Robert Koehler wrote that the film "can't decide whether to be an eccentric black comedy or a middle-of-the-road diversion" and Barry Levinson's "desire to provoke extreme laughs isn't matched by a strategy of how to get to the edge -- especially when the edge is some distance from his trusty Baltimore storytelling roots."

Stella Papamichael of BBC said that "Envy is all about flogging a dead horse", while Nick Schager of Slant stated regarding a scene in a film: "[a] canary-yellow Lamborghini's license plate reads "Caca King" in Envy, nicely summing up this dreadful money-versus-friendship comedy". According to Time Out: "Had School of Rock not made Jack Black so bankable, this comedy would surely have gone straight to video – which is where it belongs".

The film was nominated for a Golden Raspberry Award for Worst Actor (Stiller for this film, Along Came Polly, Anchorman: The Legend of Ron Burgundy, Dodgeball: A True Underdog Story and Starsky & Hutch) but lost to Fahrenheit 9/11 (George W. Bush) at the 25th Golden Raspberry Awards.
