= Bad Ronald (band) =

American rap rock band

- Bad Ronald

Background information
- Origin: New York City, New York, United States
- Genres: Rap rock
- Years active: 1999–2002
- Labels: Pop Roxxx/Reprise
- Members: Doug Ray, White Owl, Kaz Gamble, and DJ

Bad Ronald was a rap-rock band from New York City who released their self-titled debut album in 2001. Their first single, "Let's Begin", was briefly on MTV's rotation and featured in the film Not Another Teen Movie. Their second single, "1st Time", was featured in the 2002 movie Orange County. The band achieved little success in spite of their promotion with MTV. The group formed in 1999 after working shows in New York City. The group was named after former Crazy Town member Brandon Calabro's dog Kal El Bad Ronald Santeria. The group wanted "to form a band that combined rap, pop, rock, and sophomoric humor."

== Discography ==
=== Studio albums ===
Year	Album details
2001	Bad Ronald: Release date: September 11, 2001; Label: Warner Bros. Records

=== Singles ===
Year	Single	Album
2001	"Let's Begin"	Bad Ronald
2002	"1st Time"	Bad Ronald

=== Music videos ===
Year	Title	Director
2001	"Let's Begin"	Marc Klasfeld

== Band members ==
- Doug Ray MC
- White Owl MC
- Kaz Gamble MC
- DJ Deetalx turntables
