= The Ben Stiller Show =

American sketch comedy series (1990–1993)

- Created by: Ben Stiller; Judd Apatow
- Written by: Ben Stiller; Judd Apatow; Robert Cohen; David Cross; Brent Forrester; Bob Odenkirk; Sultan Pepper; Dino Stamatopoulos
- Starring: Ben Stiller; Andy Dick (Fox version); Janeane Garofalo (Fox version); Bob Odenkirk (Fox version)
- Theme music composer: Dweezil Zappa
- Country of origin: United States
- No. of episodes: 13

Production
- Running time: ~23 minutes
- Production company: HBO Independent Productions

Original release
- Network: MTV (1990); Fox (1992–93); Comedy Central (1995)
- Release: January 21 – March 1, 1990
- Release: September 27, 1992 – August 26, 1995

The Ben Stiller Show is an American sketch comedy series starring Ben Stiller that aired in two iterations, the first series airing 13 episodes on MTV in 1990, and the second series airing 12 episodes on Fox from September 27, 1992, to January 17, 1993, with a 13th episode airing in 1995 on Comedy Central. The Fox version also starred Andy Dick, Janeane Garofalo and Bob Odenkirk. Character actor John F. O'Donohue also appeared in every episode.

The program featured numerous filmed comedy segments, many of which parodied pop culture trends from the late 1980s to early 1990s. Despite receiving mostly positive reviews, Fox canceled the series after only 13 episodes, due to low ratings.

Unlike most sketch comedy programs, The Ben Stiller Show did not use a studio audience, and was the first Fox sketch comedy program not to use a laugh track. The semi spinoff, The Andy Dick Show, used the same format. After cancellation, the series won the 1993 Emmy Award for Outstanding Writing in a Variety or Music Program.

== MTV series ==
The original MTV version of The Ben Stiller Show aired in 1990, and ran for 13 episodes. It is not available on DVD, although excerpts from the program are featured as a bonus on the release of the Fox series. Produced by Jim Jones, who would go on to produce the Fox series and starring Ben Stiller and co writer Jeff Kahn, it was a self effacing show within a show format.

Part of MTV's pre-Real World and experimental Vid-Com season of 1989 to 1990, it was interspersed with music videos that Ben and company would introduce in their short comedy sketches. Regulars included Harry O'Reilly and Ben's sister Amy Stiller. Guest stars included The Jeffersons' Sherman Hemsley and Isabel Sanford, as well as John F. O'Donohue and Al Lewis.

== Episodes ==
No.	Title	Original release date
1	"Pilot"	September 27, 1992
2	"With Bobcat Goldthwait"	October 4, 1992
3	"With James Doohan"	October 18, 1992
4	"On Melrose Avenue"	October 25, 1992
5	"With Colin Quinn"	November 1, 1992
6	"With Sarah Jessica Parker"	November 8, 1992
7	"With Rob Morrow"	November 15, 1992
8	"With Flea"	December 6, 1992
9	"With Garry Shandling"	December 13, 1992
10	"With Dennis Miller"	December 20, 1992
11	"At the Beach"	January 3, 1993
12	"A Few Good Scouts"	January 17, 1993
13	"ZooTV at Night"	August 26, 1995 (on Comedy Central)

== Home media ==
Warner Home Video released all 13 episodes of the Fox version of The Ben Stiller Show on DVD in Region 1 on December 2, 2003.

DVD name	Ep#	Release date	Additional information
The Ben Stiller Show: Complete Series	13	December 2, 2003	Audio Commentaries by Ben Stiller, the entire cast and writers for the show on 7 key episodes; Featurette: A Brief History of The Ben Stiller Show including alternate versions of the pilot and two early parodies made for MTV; Deleted scenes: 5 unaired sketches with optional commentary; Outtakes; TV Special: An E! "Behind The Scenes" Special; Easter Egg

== Reunion ==
In November 2012, there was a reunion at the New York Comedy Festival with the original cast members. Apatow hosted the reunion which featured Stiller, Janeane Garofalo, Andy Dick and staff writers Robert Cohen and Jeff Kahn. Bob Odenkirk also appeared via Skype video chat.
