= Orange County (film) =

2002 film by Jake Kasdan

- Theatrical release poster
- Directed by: Jake Kasdan
- Written by: Mike White
- Produced by: Scott Rudin
- Starring: Colin Hanks; Jack Black; Catherine O'Hara; Schuyler Fisk; John Lithgow; Lily Tomlin
- Cinematography: Greg Gardiner
- Edited by: Tara Timpone
- Music by: Michael Andrews
- Production companies: MTV Films; Scott Rudin Productions
- Distributed by: Paramount Pictures
- Release dates: January 7, 2002 (Hollywood); January 11, 2002 (United States)
- Running time: 82 minutes
- Country: United States
- Language: English
- Budget: $18 million
- Box office: $43.3 million

Orange County is a 2002 American comedy film directed by Jake Kasdan, written by Mike White and starring Colin Hanks and Jack Black. The film follows Shaun Brumder, a high school student who aspires to attend Stanford University in hopes of becoming a writer, but his guidance counselor mistakenly enters an incorrect transcript, causing him to be rejected.

The film was released by Paramount Pictures on January 11, 2002 to mixed reviews from critics while grossing $43.3 million against an $18 million budget.

== Plot ==
High school junior Shaun Brumder is intelligent but disengaged from school, instead spending time surfing with his friends in affluent Orange County, California. After his best friend, Lonny, dies in a surfing accident during a massive spring storm, Shaun gives up surfing and begins to reevaluate his life. When he discovers a book by Marcus Skinner on the beach, he is inspired to pursue writing. Learning that Skinner teaches English at Stanford University, Shaun becomes determined to attend the university and study under him.

As the one-year anniversary of Lonny's death approaches, Shaun undergoes a dramatic academic transformation, earning high grades and SAT scores and becoming president of his graduating class. On the advice of his college counselor, Ms. Cobb, Shaun applies only to Stanford University; however, this backfires when she accidentally switches his transcript with that of failing slacker Shane Brainard, resulting in Shaun's rejection and Shane's mistaken acceptance.

Desperate to reverse his rejection, Shaun turns to his wealthy father, Bud, who left the family for a younger woman, Krista, and now lives in Malibu. Shaun asks Bud to make a donation to Stanford, but Bud refuses, disapproving of Shaun's aspiration to become a writer. Shaun's girlfriend, Ashley, then persuades Lonny's former girlfriend, Tanya, to arrange an interview at Shaun's home with Tanya's grandfather, a Stanford board member. However, the behavior of Shaun's dysfunctional family—including his alcoholic and emotionally fragile mother, Cindy, and older, dim-witted stoner brother, Lance—causes the interviewers to leave the house in disgust.

In a last-ditch effort, Ashley and Lance convince Shaun to drive to Palo Alto and plead his case directly to Stanford admissions director Don Durkett. By the time they arrive on campus, the admissions office is closed. While Lance distracts the secretary on duty, Shaun and Ashley obtain Durkett's home address. There, Shaun impresses Durkett with his real transcript, despite Durkett's reluctance to admit him so late in the admissions process. After persistent pleading, Shaun convinces him to reconsider, but another mishap occurs when Ashley mistakes Lance's ecstasy pills for pain relievers and offers them to Durkett for his headache, inadvertently getting him high.

Shaun, Ashley, and Durkett return to find the admissions building ablaze after an intoxicated Lance carelessly sets fire to the list of new students. With Lance now wanted for arson, the group leaves Durkett and flees the scene. Frustrated by Lance's eccentric behavior, Shaun blames him for ruining his chances of attending Stanford and criticizes him for lacking direction in life. Ashley, equally frustrated by Shaun's obsession with the university, points out that his attending would likely end their relationship before leaving him. Depressed, Shaun wanders the campus and meets a female student who invites him to a frat party. There, he becomes disillusioned after realizing the Stanford students are no less vapid than the teenagers he knew in Orange County.

Shaun later encounters Professor Skinner, and is invited to his office. There, Shaun confesses that he fears his dreams of becoming a successful writer are over. Skinner reminds him that acclaimed authors such as James Joyce and William Faulkner came from environments that were not intellectually stimulating and instead drew inspiration from conflicts in their own lives. Realizing that his ambitions had become misguided, Shaun reconciles with Ashley. The two then pick up Lance, who is still hiding from the police, and return home.

In Orange County, Shaun's parents reconnect while dealing with his situation. Realizing they are happier together than with their respective new spouses, they reconcile and acknowledge they have not been good parents to Shaun. To make amends, Bud donates enough money to Stanford to fund the construction of a new admissions building, securing Shaun's acceptance to the university. Although initially ecstatic, Shaun reflects on what his visit to Stanford taught him and ultimately decides to remain in Orange County for college with Ashley and his family, realizing they are the true inspiration for his writing. At the beach, Shaun leaves a copy of Skinner's book for someone else to discover before surfing with his friends for the first time since Lonny's death.

== Cast ==
- Colin Hanks as Shaun Brumder, a high school ex-surfer and aspiring writer determined to get into Stanford
- Jack Black as Lance Brumder, Shaun's older drug-addict ex-con brother
- Catherine O'Hara as Cindy Brumder, Shaun's unstable mother
- Schuyler Fisk as Ashley, Shaun's kind-hearted girlfriend
- John Lithgow as Bud Brumder, Shaun's wealthy distant father
- Harold Ramis as Don Durkett, Director for the Stanford Admissions
- Jane Adams as Mona, the Secretary for the Stanford Admissions Building
- Garry Marshall as Arthur Gantner, Tanya's grandfather who is a member of the Stanford Board
- Dana Ivey as Vera Gantner, Tanya's grandmother
- Carly Pope as Tanya Gantner, Ashley's friend who is a high school cheerleader that got into Stanford
- Chevy Chase as Principal Harbert, Shaun's High School principal
- Lily Tomlin as Charlotte Cobb, the college counselor
- Leslie Mann as Krista, Bud's gold-digging trophy wife
- Bret Harrison as Lonny, Shaun's late surfer buddy
- Kyle Howard as Arlo, Shaun's surfer buddy
- RJ Knoll as Chad, Shaun's surfer buddy
- George Murdock as Bob Beugler, Shaun's wealthy elderly step father
- Monica Keena as Gretchen
- Fran Kranz as Shane Brainard, a High School pothead whose transcript was mixed with Shaun's
- Mike White as Mr. Burke, Shaun's High School English teacher
- Sarah Hagan as Sarah
- Lizzy Caplan as Party Girl
- Nat Faxon as Kip
- Natasha Melnick as Katie
- Lillian Hurst as Lupe, the housekeeper working for Bob and Cindy
- Michael Aquino as Jake Brumder, Bud and Krista's young son who is addicted to his pacifier
- Alexandra Breckenridge (Uncredited) as Anna
- Kevin Kline (Uncredited) as Marcus Skinner, a Stanford professor and literature writer whose work inspired Shaun
- Ben Stiller (Uncredited) as The Firefighter

== Production ==
Principal photography took place during the spring of 2001.

== Reception ==
Orange County was given 3 of 4 stars by Roger Ebert, who described it as, "one of those happy projects where everything seems to fall naturally into place. It will sound like the kind of movie that, if you are over 17, you don't usually go to see. But it isn't. It's one of those movies where the description can't do justice to the experience." On Rotten Tomatoes, the film holds a rating 47% based on reviews from 122 critics, with an average rating of 5.2 out of 10. The site's consensus states: "Smarter than the average teen movie, but a little on the unmemorable side." On Metacritic, it has a score of 48% based on reviews from 28 critics. Audiences surveyed by CinemaScore gave the film a grade "B" on scale of A to F.

It garnered a better reception abroad than domestically. Matthew Turner of ViewLondon states that, "though there are no real belly laughs or any Farrelly-like set pieces, this is still a better than average comedy, thanks to its witty script and its amusing collection of characters. Worth watching." while Brian McKay of eFilmCritic.com describes it as, "a notch above the usual tripe we get from MTV films—but it's not a very big notch."

== Home media ==
The film was released on VHS and DVD on June 18, 2002, and was re-released in 2017, as well as available in a 3-pack set with School of Rock and Nacho Libre. It was released on Blu-ray for the first time on April 26, 2022.

== Soundtrack ==
The soundtrack was released on 2 discs on December 18, 2001. The movie itself contains 25 credited songs, leaving 9 out of the soundtrack.

1. "Defy You" - The Offspring
2. "Story of My Life" (Live) - Social Distortion
3. "The One" - Foo Fighters
4. "Shadow Stabbing" - Cake
5. "Butterfly" - Crazy Town
6. "1st Time" - Bad Ronald
7. "Lay Down Burden" - Brian Wilson
8. "Everything's Cool" - Lit
9. "Glad That It's Over" - 12 Rods
10. "Stick 'Em Up" - Quarashi
11. "Lose You" - Pete Yorn
12. "Under the Tracks" - Creeper Lagoon
13. "Love and Mercy" - Brian Wilson
14. "California" - Phantom Planet
15. "Hello" (hidden track) - Sugarbomb
