= Along Came Polly =

2004 film by John Hamburg

- Theatrical release poster
- Directed by: John Hamburg
- Written by: John Hamburg
- Produced by: Danny DeVito; Michael Shamberg; Stacey Sher
- Starring: Ben Stiller; Jennifer Aniston; Philip Seymour Hoffman; Debra Messing; Hank Azaria; Bryan Brown; Alec Baldwin
- Cinematography: Seamus McGarvey
- Edited by: William Kerr; Nick Moore
- Music by: Theodore Shapiro
- Production company: Jersey Films
- Distributed by: Universal Pictures
- Release date: January 16, 2004 (United States)
- Running time: 90 minutes
- Country: United States
- Language: English
- Budget: $42 million
- Box office: $178 million

Along Came Polly is a 2004 American romantic comedy film written and directed by John Hamburg and starring Ben Stiller and Jennifer Aniston, with supporting roles by Philip Seymour Hoffman, Debra Messing, Hank Azaria, Bryan Brown and Alec Baldwin. The story follows Reuben Feffer (Stiller) who finds his life taking a different turn when he reconnects and falls in love with his old classmate Polly (Aniston). Chaos ensues when his ex-wife, Lisa (Messing), returns to reconcile with him. The film was released on January 16, 2004 by Universal Pictures. It received mixed-to-negative reviews and grossed over $178 million worldwide on a budget of $42 million.

== Plot ==
Reuben Feffer, a risk assessment expert for a large-life insurance company, is celebrating his honeymoon with his new wife, Lisa Kramer, on the island of Saint Barthélemy. However, he catches her having sex with Claude, a scuba instructor who had walked by completely naked, causing Lisa to yap with laughter when she saw that he had an extremely large penis. Lisa claims to be in love with Claude and chooses to stay in Saint Barthélemy with him.

Reuben returns home to New York alone and attempts to piece his life back together. While at an art gallery with his friend Sandy Lyle, he runs into former middle school classmate Polly Prince.

Reuben asks out Polly, and she invites him to dinner at an elegant Moroccan restaurant, which he agrees to despite having irritable bowel syndrome. The date ends badly when Reuben clogs Polly's toilet. On their second date, they go salsa dancing. Polly dances provocatively with her friend Javier, and Reuben admits to being uncomfortable, explaining that he actually hates spicy food and generally avoids "risky" behaviors that she clearly enjoys. Despite this, Polly takes him home, and they have sex.

Polly and Reuben continue to see each other regularly. Reuben finds himself challenged to experience new things as well as by Leland Van Lew, an adventurous CEO who wants Reuben's company to insure him so that he can maintain control of his company. Reuben also asks Javier to teach him to dance salsa, which allows him to surprise and charm Polly when they return to the salsa club.

When Lisa returns hoping to reconcile with Reuben, Polly is spooked by Reuben referring to her as his girlfriend. Reuben tells Lisa he doesn't want her back and she has to leave. He enters information about them both into a computer insurance program which measures risk. It tilts the decision toward Polly. The results suggest that, despite his numerous blunders with her, she is the least risky choice for him.

Van Lew brings Reuben and Polly along on a sailing trip. As the two take shelter below deck during a storm, Polly learns of the risk assessment and argues with Reuben. She rejects his proposal to move in together, and she says that he would be better off going back to Lisa.

Back home, Reuben is despondent over losing Polly and invites Lisa to Sandy's opening show. While there, he learns that Polly is leaving New York in a few hours. At the same time, he is urgently called into work to give his risk analysis presentation on Van Lew.

After a speech given by his father, Irving, to Sandy about not living in the past, Reuben realizes he wants to be with Polly and not Lisa. Reuben rushes to her apartment to stop her from leaving. Meanwhile, Sandy fills in for Reuben for his risk analysis presentation on Leland and successfully convinces the board to insure him.

Reuben catches up with Polly and tries to persuade her to stay. Since she still is not sure they are compatible, he eats food off the ground to prove he is capable of taking risks. Polly is finally convinced and ends up dating Reuben. Both agree to take their relationship step-by-step and not rush into marriage.

A year later, Reuben and Polly vacation on the same beach in Saint Barthélemy. He has loosened up more, while Polly has become more comfortable with commitment. They encounter Claude, but instead of being angry, Reuben thanks him for setting off the course of events that led him here before heading fully naked into the water with Polly to join Leland on his new boat.

== Cast ==
- Ben Stiller as Reuben Feffer
- Jennifer Aniston as Polly Prince
- Philip Seymour Hoffman as Sandford "Sandy" Lyle
- Debra Messing as Lisa Kramer
- Hank Azaria as Claude
- Bryan Brown as Leland Van Lew
- Alec Baldwin as Stanley "Stan" Indursky
- Michele Lee as Vivian Feffer
- Bob Dishy as Irving Feffer
- Missi Pyle as Roxanne
- Jsu Garcia as Javier
- Judah Friedlander as Dustin
- Kevin Hart as Vic
- Masi Oka as Wonsuk
- Kym Whitley as Gladys
- Cheryl Hines as the Catering Manager
- Todd Stashwick as the Security Officer
- Mitch Silpa as the JCS Director
- Christine Barger as the JCS Singer/Mary Magdalene

== Reception ==
=== Box office ===
Along Came Polly opened at #1 at the box office in the United States, earning US$27,721,185 in its opening weekend, ending the month-long reign of The Lord of the Rings: The Return of the King. The film was released in the United Kingdom on February 27, 2004, and topped the country's box office for the next two weekends. The film was a financial success, making $178 million at the box office worldwide off a $42 million budget.

=== Critical response ===
On review aggregator Rotten Tomatoes, the film holds a score of 27% based on 163 reviews, with an average rating of 4.8/10. The site's critics consensus reads, "Though the supporting actors are funny, Stiller and Aniston don't make a believable couple, and the gross-out humor is gratuitous." Metacritic assigned the film a weighted average score of 44 out of 100 based on 35 critics, indicating "mixed or average" reviews. Audiences polled by CinemaScore gave the film an average grade of "B" on an A+ to F scale.

Sal Cinquemani of Slant Magazine gave the film a scoring of two-and-a-half out of four, saying, "Not since that famous tussle with Cameron Diaz's dog in There's Something About Mary has Stiller connected so agreeably with a co-star."

== Soundtrack ==
Along Came Polly

Soundtrack album by Theodore Shapiro
- Released: 2004
- Genre: Score
- Label: Universal Records

Theodore Shapiro chronology
| View from the Top (2003) | Along Came Polly (2004) | Starsky and Hutch (2004) |

All tracks are written by Theodore Shapiro.

| No. | Title | Music | Length |
|---|---|---|---|
| 1. | "Don't You (Forget About Me)" | Simple Minds | 4:23 |
| 2. | "Everything's Alright" | | 3:46 |
| 3. | "Hey Mama" | The Black Eyed Peas | 3:34 |
| 4. | "Hey Sexy Lady" | Shaggy ft. Brian Thompson, Tony Gold and Sean Paul | 3:20 |
| 5. | "Jamming" | Bob Marley | 3:47 |
| 6. | "Let's Do It Again" | The Staple Singers | 3:26 |
| 7. | "Luv Me, Luv Me" | Shaggy ft. Samantha Cole | 3:29 |
| 8. | "What's the Buzz" | | 2:19 |
| 9. | "Represent, Cuba" | Orishas | 3:42 |
| 10. | "Heaven on Their Minds" | | 4:06 |
| 11. | "Let My Love Open the Door" | Pete Townshend |
| Total length: | | | 35:52 |
