= Starsky & Hutch (film) =

2004 film by Todd Phillips

- Theatrical release poster
- Directed by: Todd Phillips
- Screenplay by: John O'Brien; Todd Phillips; Scot Armstrong
- Story by: Stevie Long; John O'Brien
- Based on: Characters by William Blinn
- Produced by: William Blinn; Stuart Cornfeld; Akiva Goldsman; Tony Ludwig; Alan Riche
- Starring: Ben Stiller; Owen Wilson; Vince Vaughn; Juliette Lewis; Snoop Dogg
- Cinematography: Barry Peterson
- Edited by: Leslie Jones
- Music by: Theodore Shapiro
- Production companies: Dimension Films; AR-TL; Weed Road Pictures; Red Hour Productions
- Distributed by: Warner Bros. Pictures (United States and Canada); Miramax International (International; through Buena Vista International)
- Release date: March 5, 2004
- Running time: 101 minutes
- Country: United States
- Language: English
- Budget: $60 million
- Box office: $170 million

Starsky & Hutch is a 2004 American buddy cop action comedy film directed by Todd Phillips. The film stars Ben Stiller as David Starsky and Owen Wilson as Ken "Hutch" Hutchinson and is a film adaptation of the original television series of the same name from the 1970s.

Two streetwise undercover cops in the fictional city of Bay City, California in 1975 bust drug criminals with the help of underworld boss Huggy Bear.

The film is a prequel to the television series, as it portrays Starsky and Hutch first being partnered. It also switches the personalities of the title characters. While in the television show, Starsky was curious and streetwise, and Hutch was by-the-book, in the film, Starsky is the serious cop, and Hutch is laid-back. There are four Frat Pack members in this film, although not all are in major roles.

The film was released by Warner Bros. Pictures in the United States and by Miramax International (through Buena Vista International) in other territories on March 5, 2004, received mixed reviews from critics and was commercially successful, earning $170 million worldwide on a $60 million budget.

== Plot ==
In 1975, two Bay City Police detectives, the macho David Starsky (who loves his 1974 Ford Gran Torino and recklessly pursues minor offenders) and the easy-going Ken "Hutch" Hutchinson (who often works alongside criminals to investigate their activity) are forced to become partners as punishment for recent antics. Meanwhile, drug kingpin Reese Feldman and his right-hand man Kevin develop a new type of cocaine that is untraceable in scent and taste. When one of his dealers botches an operation, Feldman shoots him and dumps him in the bay.

The body washes ashore a few days later, and Starsky and Hutch investigate the scene. A clue leads them to Feldman, who denies any knowledge of the crime, but his wife mentions that the dealer had been dating a cheerleader. After meeting (and flirting with) cheerleaders Stacey and Holly, the detectives are given a jacket from cheerleader Heather (who disrobes in front of them, causing an embarrassing situation). Their street-wise informant Huggy Bear directs the pair to Big Earl's biker bar.

Disguised as "Captain America" and "Billy" from Easy Rider, Starsky and Hutch learn that Big Earl is serving a prison sentence, where they question him on his connection to Feldman's illicit dealings. He forces the detectives into humiliating acts in exchange for information and a packet of what they believe to be cocaine. However, Captain Doby, angered by their wild interrogation, takes them off the case, revealing that the packet found to be artificial sweetener.

The duo invite Stacey and Holly to Starsky's place, where Starsky puts the “sweetener” in his coffee while Hutch sings "Don't Give Up on Us". Starsky soon discovers that the contents of the packet were actually Feldman's untraceable cocaine, and begins to feel the effects. The four visit a disco where Starsky, high on cocaine, loses a dance-off and tries to arrest his opponent. Hutch defuses the situation, taking Starsky home and putting him to bed, then proceeds to have a threesome with Stacey and Holly.

The duo are then attacked by another of Feldman's dealers, causing damage to the Gran Torino, which infuriates the hungover Starsky. They visit the dealer's apartment, only to be attacked again, this time by his knife-wielding young son. After they interrogate the dealer (and Starsky almost shoots himself in a game of Russian Roulette), they deduce that Feldman stores the drugs in his garage.

They go undercover as mimes at Feldman's daughter's Bat Mitzvah; confronting Feldman, Starsky shoots the lock off his garage door, inadvertently killing a pony inside that had been a gift for his daughter. Feldman hopes the botched operation will take heat off him, but Doby indefinitely suspends both detectives and reveals a complaint Starsky filed against Hutch weeks ago. Starsky tries to explain himself to Hutch, but an argument leads to a split in their friendship.

A bomb meant for Hutch instead injures his young neighbor Willis. Visiting him in the hospital, Starsky and Hutch reconcile and decide to shut down Feldman's drug business. Aided by Huggy Bear, who grudgingly goes undercover as Feldman's golf caddy, they learn that Feldman plans to sell the drugs at a charity ball by hiding them in Volkswagen Karmann Ghias to be given away to other dealers.

The duo enters the party in disguise with Stacey and Holly as their dates. Deducing Feldman's plan, they shoot open the trunk of a Karmann Ghia on stage, revealing the large stash of cocaine. Feldman takes Hutch hostage, and Starsky, attempting to rescue him, accidentally shoots Captain Doby in the shoulder. Amid the confusion, Feldman and his girlfriend Kitty escape with the money from the cocaine deal, leading Starsky and Hutch on a car chase through a golf course.

As Feldman and Kitty take off aboard a yacht, Starsky and Hutch pursue them to the end of the docks and drive the Gran Torino off a loading ramp; aiming to land it on the yacht. Instead, they miss and land in the water. The two manage to safely resurface, but the car is lost. Meanwhile, Huggy, hiding on board the yacht, knocks Feldman out with his prized golf club and takes one of Feldman's briefcases of money (and his sunglasses).

At a party celebrating the capture of Feldman, Starsky mourns the loss of his car. Huggy surprises him with a brand new, identical Gran Torino (bought from the original Starsky and Hutch duo, David Soul and Paul Michael Glaser). The two partners roll out on another case in their new car, driving triumphantly through the L.A. River as the credits roll.

== Cast ==
- Ben Stiller as Detective David Starsky
- Owen Wilson as Detective Ken "Hutch" Hutchinson
- Vince Vaughn as Mr. Reese Feldman
- Snoop Dogg as "Huggy Bear" Brown
- Jason Bateman as Kevin Jutsum
- Fred Williamson as Captain Doby
- Carmen Electra as Stacey Haack
- Amy Smart as Holly Monk
- Juliette Lewis as Kitty
- Molly Sims as Mrs. Feldman
- George Cheung as Chau
- Chris Penn as Manetti
- Terry Crews as Porter
- Brande Roderick as Heather
- Jeffrey Lorenzo as Willis Lewis
- Har Mar Superstar as Rick "Dancing Rick"
- Patton Oswalt as Disco DJ
- Richard Edson as Monix
- Paul Michael Glaser as Original Starsky
- David Soul as Original Hutch
- Will Ferrell as Earl "Big Earl" Drennan (uncredited)

== Reception ==
=== Box office ===
In the film's opening weekend, it grossed $28,103,367 in 3,185 theaters. Starsky & Hutch has had gross receipts of $88,237,754 in the U.S. and Canada and $82,030,996 in international markets for a total of $170,268,750 worldwide.

=== Critical reception ===
On Rotten Tomatoes, Starsky & Hutch has an approval rating of 63% based on 192 reviews. The website's critical consensus reads: "It's uneven and occasionally somewhat aimless, but Starsky & Hutch benefits from Stiller and Wilson's chemistry and a surprisingly warm-hearted script." On Metacritic, the film earned a weighted average score of 55 out of 100 based on 40 reviews, indicating "mixed or average reviews". Audiences surveyed by CinemaScore gave the film a grade B on scale of A to F.

Roger Ebert awarded it 3 out of 4 stars. Ebert called it "a surprisingly funny movie, the best of the 1970s recycling jobs, with one laugh ("Are you OK, little pony?") almost as funny as the moment in Dumb and Dumber when the kid figured out his parakeet's head was Scotch-taped on". Brian Lowry of Variety magazine wrote: "Blessed with sporadic moments of cheeky fun, isn't painful but seldom advances beyond costumes and hairstyling in terms of creativity".

Ben Stiller earned a Golden Raspberry Award nomination for Worst Actor. Carmen Electra earned a nomination for Worst Supporting Actress.
