= Theodore Shapiro =

American composer

- Born: Theodore Michael Shapiro; Washington, D.C., U.S.
- Genres: Film score, electronic
- Occupation: Composer
- Instruments: Piano, keyboards, synthesizer
- Website: theodoreshapiro.com

Theodore Michael Shapiro (/ʃəˈpaɪroʊ/ shə-PY-roh;) is an American composer known for his film scores.

He is a frequent collaborator of directors Ben Stiller, Paul Feig, Jay Roach, Karyn Kusama, and Rawson Marshall Thurber, and won the 2022 and 2025 Primetime Emmy Award for Outstanding Music Composition for a Series for his work on Stiller’s series Severance.

== Early life and education ==
Shapiro was born in Washington, D.C., and is of Italian descent. He earned a Bachelor of Arts degree in music from Brown University in 1993, followed by a Master of Fine Arts in music composition from the Juilliard School in 1995.

== Career ==
Shapiro is best known for his film scores, including State and Main, 13 Going on 30, Along Came Polly, The Devil Wears Prada, Fun with Dick and Jane, Idiocracy, You, Me and Dupree, Wet Hot American Summer, Marley & Me, Tropic Thunder, Dinner for Schmucks, Diary of a Wimpy Kid, Ghostbusters, A Simple Favor and its sequel, The Eyes of Tammy Faye, Wolfs and The Roses. He has also composed the animated films The Pirates! Band of Misfits, Captain Underpants: The First Epic Movie, Spies in Disguise, Trolls World Tour and Trolls Band Together.

== Filmography ==
=== Film ===
Year	Title	Director(s)	Notes
1995	The State's Annual All-Star Halloween Special		Television film
1996	Tick		Short film
1997	Hurricane Streets	Morgan J. Freeman	
1997	Six Ways to Sunday	Adam Bernstein	
1998	Restaurant	Eric Bross	
1998	Safe Men	John Hamburg	
1999	The Kinsey 3		Television film
1999	On the Ropes	Nanette Burstein; Brett Morgen	Documentary film
2000	Girlfight	Karyn Kusama	
2000	State and Main	David Mamet	
2000	Prince of Central Park	John Leekley	
2001	Wet Hot American Summer	David Wain	
2001	Heist	David Mamet	
2001	Not Another Teen Movie	Joel Gallen	
2002	Love in the Time of Money	Peter Mattei	
2002	Bug	Phil Hay; Matt Manfredi	
2003	Old School	Todd Phillips	
2003	View from the Top	Bruno Barreto	
2003	Girlhood		Documentary film
2004	Fashion Fa Shizzle Wit Huggie Bizzle		Short film
2004	Along Came Polly	John Hamburg	BMI Film & TV Award for Film Music
2004	Starsky & Hutch	Todd Phillips	BMI Film & TV Award for Film Music
2004	13 Going on 30	Gary Winick	
2004	DodgeBall: A True Underdog Story	Rawson Marshall Thurber	BMI Film & TV Award for Film Music
2005	The Baxter	Michael Showalter	
2005	Fun with Dick and Jane	Dean Parisot	
2006	The Devil Wears Prada	David Frankel	BMI Film & TV Award for Film Music
2006	You, Me and Dupree	Anthony Russo; Joe Russo	BMI Film & TV Award for Film Music
2006	Idiocracy	Mike Judge	
2006	A Crime	Manuel Pradal	with Ennio Morricone
2007	Blades of Glory	Will Speck; Josh Gordon	BMI Film & TV Award for Film Music
2007	The Girl in the Park	David Auburn	
2007	Mr. Woodcock	Craig Gillespie	
2008	The Mysteries of Pittsburgh	Rawson Marshall Thurber	
2008	Semi-Pro	Kent Alterman	
2008	Tropic Thunder	Ben Stiller	BMI Film & TV Award for Film Music; Nominated—International Film Music Critics Award for Best Original Score for a Comedy Film
2008	Marley & Me	David Frankel	BMI Film & TV Award for Film Music
2009	I Love You, Man	John Hamburg	BMI Film & TV Award for Film Music
2009	Year One	Harold Ramis	
2009	Jennifer's Body	Karyn Kusama	with Stephen Barton
2009	Did You Hear About the Morgans?	Marc Lawrence	
2010	Diary of a Wimpy Kid	Thor Freudenthal	BMI Film & TV Award for Film Music
2010	Dinner for Schmucks	Jay Roach	
2011	Arthur	Jason Winer	with Mark Ronson
2011	The Big Year	David Frankel	
2011	The Change-Up	David Dobkin	with John Debney
2012	Game Change	Jay Roach	Television film Nominated—Online Film & Television Association Award for Best Music in a Non-Series; Nominated—Primetime Emmy Award for Outstanding Music Composition for a Miniseries, Movie or Special
2012	The Pirates! In an Adventure with Scientists	Peter Lord	First score for an animated film
2012	Hope Springs	David Frankel	BMI Film & TV Award for Film Music
2012	The Campaign	Jay Roach	BMI Film & TV Award for Film Music
2013	We're the Millers	Rawson Marshall Thurber	with Ludwig Göransson
2013	One Chance	David Frankel	
2013	The Secret Life of Walter Mitty	Ben Stiller	International Film Music Critics Award for Best Original Score for a Comedy Film; Nominated—Georgia Film Critics Association Award for Best Original Song; Nominated—Satellite Award for Best Original Score
2014	Infinitely Polar Bear	Maya Forbes	
2014	St. Vincent	Theodore Melfi	
2015	The Invitation	Karyn Kusama	
2015	Spy	Paul Feig	Nominated—International Film Music Critics Award for Best Original Score for a Comedy Film
2015	Danny Collins	Dan Fogelman	
2015	Trumbo	Jay Roach	
2015	The Intern	Nancy Meyers	
2016	Zoolander 2	Ben Stiller	
2016	Central Intelligence	Rawson Marshall Thurber	with Ludwig Göransson
2016	Ghostbusters	Paul Feig	
2016	Office Christmas Party	Josh Gordon; Will Speck	
2016	Collateral Beauty	David Frankel	
2016	Why Him?	John Hamburg	
2017	The Polka King	Maya Forbes	
2017	Snatched	Jonathan Levine	with Chris Bacon
2017	Captain Underpants: The First Epic Movie	David Soren	Replaced John Debney; Also songwriter for "Saturday"; International Film Music Critics Award for Best Original Score for an Animated Film; Nominated—Annie Award for Outstanding Achievement for Music in an Animated Feature Production
2018	A Simple Favor	Paul Feig	
2018	Destroyer	Karyn Kusama	
2019	Last Christmas	Paul Feig	
2019	Bombshell	Jay Roach	
2019	Spies in Disguise	Nick Bruno; Troy Quane	Nominated—Annie Award for Outstanding Achievement for Music in an Animated Feature Production
2020	Trolls World Tour	Walt Dohrn	Replaced Christophe Beck
2021	The Eyes of Tammy Faye	Michael Showalter	
2021	The Good House	Maya Forbes; Wally Wolodarsky	
2022	The School for Good and Evil	Paul Feig	
2023	Trolls Band Together	Walt Dohrn	
2024	Jackpot!	Paul Feig	
2024	Wolfs	Jon Watts	
2025	Another Simple Favor	Paul Feig	
2025	The Roses	Jay Roach	
2025	The Housemaid	Paul Feig	
2026	The Devil Wears Prada 2	David Frankel	
2026	Focker-in-Law	John Hamburg	

=== Television ===
Year	Title	Notes
1993–1995	The State	
2007	HBO Voyeur Project	Miniseries
2021	The Mysterious Benedict Society	Nominated—Outstanding Music Direction and Composition for a Live Action Program
2021	Yellowjackets	Episode: "Pilot"
2022	Severance	Primetime Emmy Award for Outstanding Music Composition for a Series (Original Dramatic Score) (2022, 2025); Nominated—Grammy Award for Best Score Soundtrack for Visual Media; Nominated—Primetime Emmy Award for Outstanding Original Main Title Theme Music
