= Gregory Goodman =

American film producer

Gregory Goodman is an American film producer.

== Filmography ==
He was a producer in all films unless otherwise noted.

=== Film ===
Producer

- A Pig's Tale (1994) (Direct-to-video)
- Canadian Bacon (1995) (Re-shoots)
- Polish Wedding (1998) (co-producer)
- I Heart Huckabees (2004)
- Æon Flux (2005)
- Stop-Loss (2008)
- The Day the Earth Stood Still (2008)
- Gulliver's Travels (2010)
- X-Men: First Class (2011)
- Shock Value (2014)
- Fantastic Four (2015)
- Jason Bourne (2016)
- 22 July (2018)
- News of the World (2020)
- Civil War (2024)
- The Lost Bus (2025)
- The Uprising (2026)

Line producer

- Candyman (1992)
- Kalifornia (1993)
- Final Combination (1994)

Executive producer

- Hit Me (1996)
- Three Kings (1999)
- The Gift (2000)
- 8 Mile (2002)
- Captain Phillips (2013)

Production manager

Year	Film	Role	Notes
1987	Summer Heat	Unit manager	
1988	Pulse	Post-production supervisor	
1991	Talkin' Dirty After Dark	Production manager	
1991	House Party 2	Production manager	
1994	A Pig's Tale	Unit production manager	Direct-to-video
1996	Barb Wire	Unit production manager: Additional photography	
1999	Three Kings	Production manager	
2000	The Gift	Unit production manager	
2010	Gulliver's Travels	Unit production manager	
2011	X-Men: First Class	Unit production manager	
2013	Captain Phillips	Unit production manager	
2016	Jason Bourne	Unit production manager	

Miscellaneous crew

Year	Film	Role
1984	The Oasis	Production associate
1985	Radioactive Dreams	Production assistant

Second unit director or assistant director

Year	Film	Role
1985	Savage Dawn	Second assistant director
1986	Hamburger: The Motion Picture	Second assistant director

Thanks

Year	Film	Role
1994	Spanking the Monkey	Special thanks
2001	The Deep End	Special thanks
2015	The Invitation	Special thanks
