= Jay Larson =

American comedian, actor, and writer

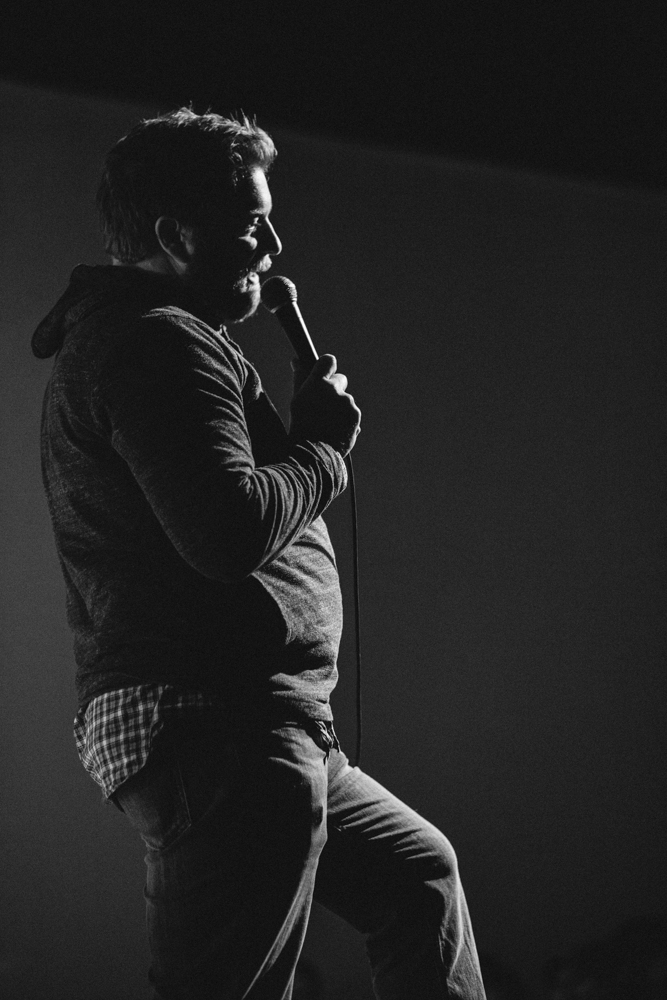
Larson performing at SXSW on March 11, 2013

Jason "Jay" Larson is an American comedian, actor, and writer. He currently resides in Los Angeles.

== Early life ==
Larson grew up in Stoneham, Massachusetts. The youngest of four, he was raised by his mother and grandmother. He attended Saint Anselm College and earned a degree in English in 1999. While in college, he played on the baseball team and played the Rabbi during his senior year in the school's production of Fiddler on the Roof. Upon graduation he moved to Los Angeles to be a writer and actor.

== Career ==
Larson began performing stand-up comedy in Los Angeles in 2001, and in 2004, he became a paid regular at The Comedy Store. The following year, he appeared as one of the featured "New Faces" at the Montreal Comedy Festival.

Larson first appeared on The Late Late Show with Craig Ferguson in 2005 and in 2011, he also had a half-hour special on Comedy Central. His story "Wrong Number" made the front page of Reddit and was featured on This American Life with Ira Glass in 2016. In 2015, Larson appeared on Comedy Central's This Is Not Happening.

From 2012 to 2018 Larson co-hosted the comedy podcast "The CrabFeast" together with comedian Ryan Sickler.

Larson co-hosted two seasons of Esquire Network's Best Bars in America, which was produced in 2014. In the spring of 2015, Larson appeared in the thriller film The Invitation. The Karyn Kusama-directed film led to a role as a limo driver in the third season of Twin Peaks on Showtime in 2017. Larson has also created two television shows for NBC Universal that were not picked up.

== Personal life ==
Larson currently resides in Los Angeles. He has one daughter and one son. During the pandemic, he and his wife divorced.

== Discography ==
- Self Diagnosed (2011)
- Human Math (2016)
- Me Being Me (2018)

== Filmography ==
- The Invitation (2015)
- Twin Peaks: The Return (2017)
- Me Being Me (2019) - Comedy special released on Larson's YouTube channel.
- Sounds Like Bruce (2023) - Comedy special released on Larson's YouTube channel.
- Here We Go Again (2024) - Comedy special released on Larson's YouTube channel.
