= Girlfight =

2000 film by Karyn Kusama

- Theatrical release poster
- Directed by: Karyn Kusama
- Written by: Karyn Kusama
- Produced by: Sarah Green; Martha Griffin; Maggie Renzi
- Starring: Michelle Rodriguez; Jaime Tirelli; Paul Calderón; Santiago Douglas
- Cinematography: Patrick Cady
- Edited by: Plummy Tucker
- Music by: Gene McDaniels; Theodore Shapiro
- Production companies: Independent Film Channel Productions; Green/Renzi Productions
- Distributed by: Screen Gems (United States, Canada, United Kingdom and Ireland; through Sony Pictures Releasing); United Artists Films (International)
- Release dates: January 22, 2000 (Sundance); September 29, 2000 (United States)
- Running time: 110 minutes
- Country: United States
- Languages: English; Spanish
- Budget: $1 million
- Box office: $1.7 million

Girlfight is a 2000 American sports drama film written and directed by Karyn Kusama in her feature directorial debut, and starring Michelle Rodriguez in her film debut. It follows a troubled Brooklyn high school student who decides to channel her aggression by training to become a boxer, despite the disapproval of her father and prospective trainers, as well as the competitors in the male-dominated sport.

Kusama wrote the screenplay for Girlfight after learning to box, wanting to make a film about the sport with a female protagonist. Although she struggled to find financiers for the film's $1 million budget, the production was eventually funded by John Sayles, Maggie Renzi, and the Independent Film Channel. Rodriguez was cast in the lead role despite having never acted before, and trained in boxing for four months before filming commenced in New York and New Jersey.

Girlfight premiered at the Sundance Film Festival on January 22, 2000, where it tied with You Can Count on Me for the Grand Jury Prize, and Kusama won the Best Director Award. It was theatrically released by Screen Gems on September 29, 2000, to critical acclaim, with particular praise for Rodriguez's performance and Kusama's direction. The film earned several accolades, including a nomination for the Bronze Horse at the 2000 Stockholm International Film Festival. At the 16th Independent Spirit Awards, Kusama was nominated for Best First Feature and Rodriguez won for Best Debut Performance.

== Plot ==
Diana Guzman is a Brooklyn teenager whose hot temper gets her into trouble at school as she repeatedly gets into fights with other students. Her frustration stems from her unhappy home life. She lives in a public housing estate with her brother Tiny and their abusive father, Sandro. Sandro pays for Tiny's boxing training in hopes of his becoming a professional boxer, although Tiny would prefer to be an artist.

After visiting Tiny's gym and intervening in a spar to defend him, Diana asks the trainers to let her box, too. She is told she can train there, but not compete in actual fights. When she learns that she cannot afford coaching from Tiny's trainer, Hector Soto, she asks her father for an allowance but he tells her to get a job. She resorts to steal the money instead and returns to the gym, where Hector begins to teach her the basics of boxing.

Diana's first spar is with Adrian Sturges, whom she later meets again when Hector takes her to a professional fight. Adrian invites Diana to dinner after the fight, and kisses her after walking her home. One night after a spar which gave Diana a black eye, Sandro sees Diana and Adrian together, and confronts her, assuming that she is in an abusive relationship. She storms out of the apartment and spends the night with Adrian. When he asks about her parents, she reveals that her mother committed suicide several years ago. When Diana returns to her apartment, Tiny offers to give up boxing so that she can use the coaching money he gets from their father.

Diana attends Hector's birthday party, but leaves when she sees Adrian getting friendly with his ex-girlfriend. When Diana and Adrian spar at their next session in the gym, he is reluctant to hit her, and she leaves before he can talk to her. Diana's first amateur match is scheduled against another girl, but when her opponent pulls out she ends up fighting a man, Ray Cortez. Sandro arrives in the middle of the fight to see the match end in Ray's disqualification for illegal shoving. When Diana arrives home, Sandro berates her for looking like a loser. She retaliates by beating him to the floor and accuses him of abusing her mother to the point of suicide.

After weeks of rigorous training, Diana wins another amateur fight, this time against a girl, Ricki Stiles. Although Diana has accepted Adrian's apology, tensions rise between them again when they learn that they both have advanced to the finals in their division to fight each other. Adrian refuses to fight a girl and Diana struggles to convince him to view her as a legitimate opponent. He turns up for the fight on the day, however, and after an even match, Diana wins with a unanimous decision by the judges. After the fight, Adrian fears that he has lost Diana's respect, but she tells him she respects him even more for fighting her, before reconciling.

== Cast ==
- Michelle Rodriguez as Diana Guzman
- Jaime Tirelli as Hector Soto
- Paul Calderón as Sandro Guzman
- Santiago Douglas as Adrian Sturges
- Ray Santiago as Tiny Guzman
- Victor Sierra as Ray Cortez
- Elisa Bocanegra as Marisol
- Shannon Walker Williams as Veronica
- Louis Guss as Don
- Herb Lovelle as Cal
- Thomas Barbour as Ira

== Production ==
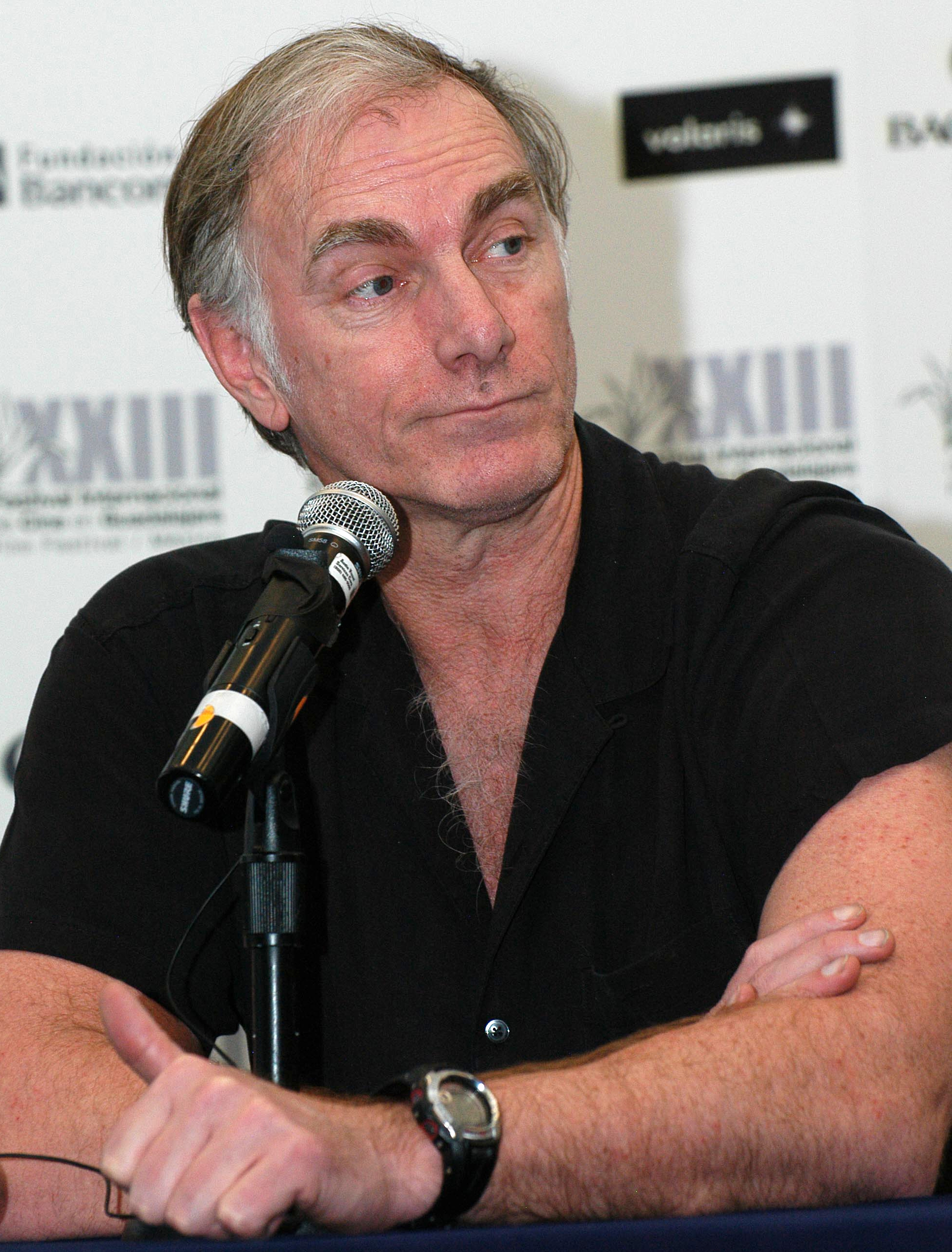
Filmmaker John Sayles provided funding for the film's budget after its only financier backed out.

Girlfight was written and directed by Karyn Kusama, marking her feature film debut. Her aim was to subvert "the classic boxing story" with a female lead, having taken up boxing herself in 1992 at the famous Gleason's Gym in Brooklyn. After writing the script, she struggled to persuade production companies to finance the film; numerous producers suggested that Kusama cast a white woman in the lead role rather than a Latina and felt that having a female protagonist was "unappealing [and] unbelievable". Maggie Renzi, Sarah Green, and Martha Griffin eventually agreed to produce the film, and found a financier in 1999 to provide the $1 million budget. Two days before pre-production on the film was set to begin the financier backed out, but Renzi and her partner John Sayles—an independent filmmaker and Kusama's former mentor—decided to provide funding for the film's entire budget themselves. The Independent Film Channel later contributed $300,000 towards the budget.

Kusama initially sought to cast a professional actor to play Diana, but felt that many of those who auditioned were overly feminized and "polished" and decided to cast an untrained actor instead. Michelle Rodriguez, who had worked as a film extra but had never auditioned for a speaking role before, attended an open casting call for the lead. Although Kusama described Rodriguez's audition as "a disaster", she won the role because out of the 350 auditionees Kusama "could not find anyone who could come close to her in physical power". Since Rodriguez was not a boxer, she trained at Gleason's Gym five to six days a week for four months in preparation for filming, as did Santiago Douglas, who was cast as Adrian.

Girlfight was filmed over 24 days in New York and New Jersey. The scenes inside the gym where Diana and Tiny train were shot in a warehouse in Jersey City. The initial boxing sequences were shot from a spectator's view outside of the ring, but later sequences were filmed more intimately from inside the ring. Director of Photography Patrick Cady used camera rigs that allowed the actors to hit him or the camera itself to mimic the sensation of being hit.

== Release ==
Girlfight premiered on January 22, 2000, at the Sundance Film Festival, where it won the festival's Grand Jury Prize and the Directing Award in Dramatic Competition. North American distribution rights to the film were subsequently purchased by Screen Gems for $3 million, beating out studios including Fine Line Features, Paramount Pictures, and USA Films, while United Artists Films, the international arm of United Artists, bought international rights shortly after.

It received a limited release in the United States on September 29, 2000, opening in 28 theaters. In its debut week, it ranked 30th at the box office, grossing $282,145 with a per-screen average of $10,077. The following week it expanded to 253 theaters, but fell to a per-screen average of $2,687, ranking 18th. In its third week, the film's per-screen average dropped to $1,156 with a cumulative total gross of $1,254,600. Girlfight ended its theatrical run after five weeks with a total domestic gross of $1,565,852. Internationally, it grossed $100,176, making a worldwide total of $1,666,028.

The film was released on DVD on March 27, 2001. It includes two special features: an audio commentary by Karyn Kusama and a "making of" featurette. The Criterion Collection released the film on Blu-ray on May 28, 2024.

== Reception ==
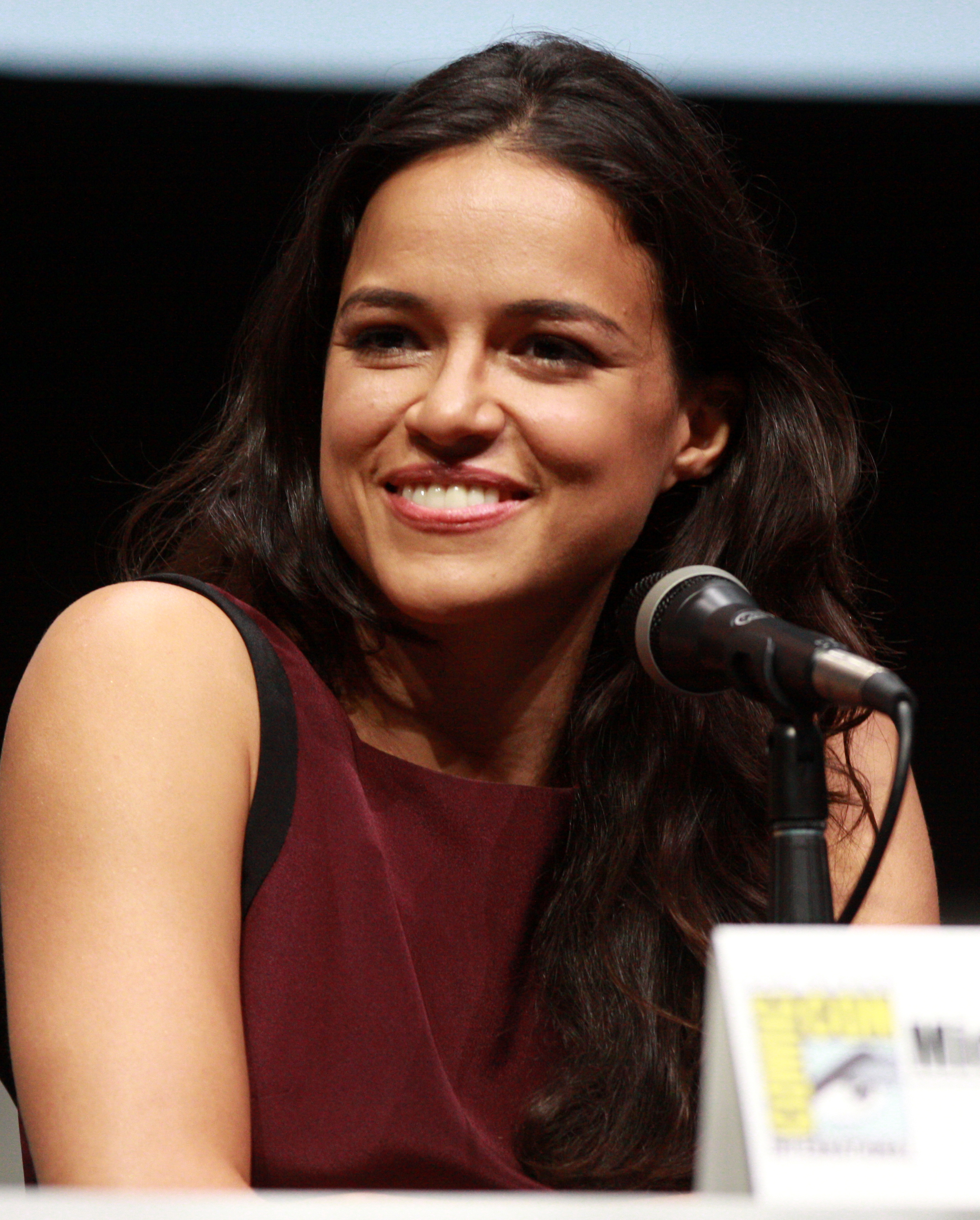
Michelle Rodriguez drew praise from many critics and earned her numerous awards.

=== Critical response ===
Girlfight was well received by critics upon its release. It has a score of 87% on Rotten Tomatoes, based on 133 reviews with an average rating of 7.4 out of 10. The website's critical consensus states: "Michelle Rodriguez gives a compelling performance, despite lack of a boxing background; Karyn Kusama packs a punch with this directorial debut." The film has a score of 70 out of 100 on Metacritic, based on 34 critics' reviews, indicating "generally favorable" reviews.

Numerous reviews praised Rodriguez's performance in her debut role, with several critics comparing her to Marlon Brando. David Denby of The New Yorker called her "a powerhouse star who could go a long way", while Variety critic Emanuel Levy described her as "a natural performer who dominates every scene". In a review for The New York Times, A. O. Scott characterized Rodriguez as "a powerful, extraordinarily gifted young actress ... Remember the name." The Washington Post's Desson Howe felt that Rodriguez's performance was the most memorable aspect of the film, and that she "becomes more appealing, formidable and beautiful by the scene".

Karyn Kusama's script and direction were also highlighted by critics. The Los Angeles Times's Kenneth Turan commended her "craft, empathy and respect" and compared her to the character of Diana, writing that Kusama "is her protagonist's double in terms of drive, commitment and ability". Lisa Schwarzbaum of Entertainment Weekly felt that, although the plot was clichéd and unrealistic at times, Kusama's direction showed "a clear, personal filmmaking style ... and a respect for her characters' weaknesses as well as their moments of athletic beauty". James Berardinelli gave the film three and a half stars out of four, calling it "a well crafted and emotionally satisfying debut" and applauding Kusama's "single-minded determination and a passion for the project".

Roger Ebert gave the film three and a half out of four stars in a Chicago Sun-Times review, and enjoyed that the story is "always about more than boxing" with its deeper themes "about a girl growing up in a macho society and ... discovering she has a nature probably more macho than the men around her". On the other hand, the San Francisco Chronicle's Edward Guthmann opined that Kusama "ultimately undercuts her theme of female self-reliance by having Diana fall for Adrian" and criticized the plot for "tak[ing] too much time justifying a woman's right to be in the ring – instead of celebrating her achievement".

== Accolades ==
Award	Category	Recipient(s)	Result
ALMA Awards	Outstanding Feature Film		Nominated
ALMA Awards	Outstanding Latino Cast in a Feature Film		Nominated
Black Reel Awards	Theatrical – Best Actress	Michelle Rodriguez	Nominated
Black Reel Awards	Best Film		Nominated
Black Reel Awards	Theatrical – Best Director	Karyn Kusama	Nominated
Cannes Film Festival	Foreign Film Award of the Youth		Won
Chicago Film Critics Association Awards	Most Promising Actress	Michelle Rodriguez	Nominated
Deauville American Film Festival	Grand Prix du Cinema Independent		Won
Deauville American Film Festival	Ralph Lauren Acting Award	Michelle Rodriguez	Won
Flanders International Film Festival Ghent	Special Mention	Karyn Kusama	Won
Flanders International Film Festival Ghent	Grand Prix		Nominated
Gotham Awards	Breakthrough Actor	Michelle Rodriguez	Won
Gotham Awards	Open Palm Award	Karyn Kusama	Won
Imagen Awards	Best Theatrical Feature Film		Won
Independent Spirit Awards	Best Debut Performance	Michelle Rodriguez	Won
Independent Spirit Awards	Best First Feature	Karyn Kusama	Nominated
Las Vegas Film Critics Society Awards	Best Female Newcomer	Karyn Kusama & Michelle Rodriguez (shared)	Won
Las Vegas Film Critics Society Awards	Best Actress	Michelle Rodriguez	Nominated
National Board of Review Awards	Breakthrough Performance – Female	Michelle Rodriguez	Won
National Board of Review Awards	Special Recognition for Excellence in Filmmaking		Won
Online Film Critics Society Awards	Best First Feature	Karyn Kusama	Nominated
Online Film Critics Society Awards	Best First Screenplay	Karyn Kusama	Nominated
Online Film Critics Society Awards	Best Cinematic Debut/Breakthrough	Michelle Rodriguez	Nominated
Stockholm International Film Festival	Bronze Horse	Karyn Kusama	Nominated
Sundance Film Festival	Grand Jury Prize		Won
Sundance Film Festival	Directing Award in Dramatic Competition	Karyn Kusama	Won
Teen Choice Awards	Film – Choice Breakout Performance	Michelle Rodriguez	Nominated
Valladolid International Film Festival	Silver Spike	Karyn Kusama	Won
Valladolid International Film Festival	Golden Spike	Karyn Kusama	Nominated

== Legacy ==
Girlfight was one of the first boxing films to portray women in the sport. Film studies academic Katharina Lindner has argued that Girlfight was responsible for the "influx of female protagonists into the [boxing film] genre" of the 2000s, specifically the 2004 films Million Dollar Baby and Die Boxerin (alternatively titled About a Girl).

The film was responsible for launching Rodriguez and Kusama's careers in film; Rodriguez went on to star in numerous major studio films while Kusama later directed Æon Flux (2005) and Jennifer's Body (2009).

== See also ==
- List of boxing films

Awards
Preceded by Three Seasons	Sundance Grand Jury Prize: U.S. Dramatic; 2000 tied with You Can Count on Me	Succeeded by The Believer
