= Æon Flux (film) =

2005 American sci-fi action film

- Theatrical release poster
- Directed by: Karyn Kusama
- Screenplay by: Phil Hay; Matt Manfredi
- Based on: Æon Flux by Peter Chung
- Produced by: Gale Anne Hurd; David Gale; Gary Lucchesi; Greg Goodman
- Starring: Charlize Theron; Marton Csokas; Jonny Lee Miller; Sophie Okonedo; Pete Postlethwaite; Frances McDormand; Nikolai Kinski
- Cinematography: Stuart Dryburgh
- Edited by: Peter Honess; Plummy Tucker
- Music by: Graeme Revell
- Production companies: Lakeshore Entertainment; MTV Films; Valhalla Motion Pictures
- Distributed by: Paramount Pictures
- Release date: December 2, 2005
- Running time: 93 minutes
- Country: United States
- Language: English
- Budget: $55-62 million
- Box office: $52.3 million

Æon Flux is a 2005 American science fiction action film based on the 1990s MTV animated television series created by Peter Chung. It was directed by Karyn Kusama, written by Phil Hay and Matt Manfredi, and produced by Gale Anne Hurd, David Gale, Gary Lucchesi and Greg Goodman. The film was produced by MTV Films, Lakeshore Entertainment, Babelsberg Film Studio and Valhalla Motion Pictures. It stars Charlize Theron as the title character, Marton Csokas, Jonny Lee Miller, Sophie Okonedo, Pete Postlethwaite, and Frances McDormand.

Æon Flux was released on December 2, 2005 by Paramount Pictures in the United States. The film was poorly received by critics and failed at the box office, only grossing $52.3 million against a production budget of $55–62 million.

== Plot ==
In 2011, a deadly pathogenic virus has killed 99 percent of the Earth's population, forcing the survivors to regroup and scatter across the Earth. Four centuries later, in 2415, the remaining five million humans inhabit Bregna, a dystopian walled futuristic city-state, which is ruled by a congress of scientists. Although Bregna is largely an idyllic place in the destroyed Earth, people routinely disappear and the population is plagued by nightmares.

A skilled warrior, named Æon Flux, is a member of the Monicans, an underground rebel organization who communicate through telepathy-enabling technology and are led by the Handler. After a mission to destroy a surveillance station, Æon comes home to find her sister Una has been mistaken for a Monican and killed. When Æon is sent on a mission to kill the government's leader, Trevor Goodchild, she discovers that both she and the Monicans are being manipulated by a cabal of council members working towards a coup d'état, unrelated to the goals of the Monicans.

Æon questions the origins of everyone in Bregna and in particular, her personal connection to Trevor. Everyone in Bregna is revealed to be a clone, grown from recycled DNA. Cloning was required because the antidote to the virus made humans infertile. With the dead constantly being reborn as new individuals and bearing partial memories of their previous lives, their troubling dreams have increased. Trevor's ongoing experiments were attempts to reverse the infertility. His preceding clones had all worked on this problem. Æon learns that she is a clone of the original Trevor's wife Katherine and that she is the first "Katherine" clone in over 400 years.

Una was one of Trevor's most successful experiments: part of a group of clones that proved to be fertile, Una having been pregnant when she was killed. However, in order to keep the dynasty of Goodchild clones in power, Trevor's brother, Oren, had Una killed along with the other members of the fertile experimental group. He ordered all of Trevor's research to be destroyed. In a confrontation with Trevor and Æon, Oren reveals that nature has corrected the infertility problem and that some women are becoming pregnant without intervention by scientists. Oren has had them all killed to maintain the Goodchild reign. Æon then goes against both Oren and her former allies, who want to kill Trevor and also kill her for not killing Trevor.

Æon convinces the other Monicans tracking her, including her friend Sithandra, to ignore the Handler and to help her kill Oren and his men. Æon goes to destroy the Relical, the dirigible that stores the DNA for cloning. There she meets Keeper, the old man who monitors everything. She discovers that he preserved Katherine's DNA for years, although an earlier Oren clone had ordered it to be destroyed so "Katherine" could not influence any Trevors. The dirigible crashes into the city wall, breaking it down to reveal the surrounding land for the first time in centuries.

== Cast ==
- Charlize Theron as Æon Flux
- Marton Csokas as Trevor Goodchild
- Jonny Lee Miller as Oren Goodchild
- Sophie Okonedo as Sithandra
- Pete Postlethwaite as Keeper
- Amelia Warner as Una Flux
- Caroline Chikezie as Freya
- Paterson Joseph as Giroux
- Frances McDormand as Handler
- Nikolai Kinski as Claudius
- Yangzom Brauen as Inari

== Production ==
The screenplay was written by Phil Hay and Matt Manfredi based on the animated television series by Peter Chung. In the early stages of production, actress Michelle Rodriguez was considered for the part of Æon. She had previously worked with Kusama in Girlfight. Kusama had originally suggested filming in Brasília, the capital of Brazil, because the 20th-century modern architecture of that city fit with her vision of Bregna. The producers rejected the idea because Brasília lacked the infrastructure and technical expertise to support a major film production. After several cities were scouted, Berlin and Potsdam in Germany were chosen for filming. Berlin had several locations that fit into the organic yet structured world of Æon Flux. The crew gained permission to film in several locations that had never allowed such access before, including the Treptow Crematorium, the Adlershof Trudelturm and Windkanal wind tunnel facility, and the Haus der Kulturen der Welt ("House of the World's Cultures"). Additional locations included Sanssouci Park, the Bauhaus Archive and a dissection theatre built in 1790 to train veterinarians, part of the Berlin animal shelter. It was used as the Handler space. Filming was temporarily suspended for a month during September 2004 while Theron recovered from a neck injury she sustained during stunt-work on the tenth day of shooting. She was hospitalized in Berlin for five days and required about six weeks of physiotherapy to recover.

Kusama says that after she finished the film, the studio took it away from her and heavily re-edited it, changing storylines and characters, believing that her version was too much of an art film.

== Release ==
=== Box office ===
Paramount chose not to screen Æon Flux for critics prior to its release. The film opened at number two at the U.S. box office, making $12,661,112 in its opening weekend, held off the top spot by Harry Potter and the Goblet of Fire. Æon Flux suffered a decline of 63.97% in box office earnings, going down to number six the following week when The Chronicles of Narnia: The Lion, the Witch and the Wardrobe and King Kong were released during the holiday season. On February 9, 2006, it completed its theatrical run, grossing a domestic take of $25,874,337 and a worldwide box office total of $52,304,001.

=== Critical reception ===
The film holds a 9% approval rating on Rotten Tomatoes based on 107 reviews, with an average rating of 3.8/10. The consensus states, "Aeon Flux lacks the gravity-defying pace of its animated predecessor, and, despite some flash, is largely a dull affair." On Metacritic it has a weighted average score of 36 out of 100 based on reviews from 23 critics, indicating "generally unfavorable" reviews. Variety said it was "savaged by terrible reviews". Theron said that she had doubts about the project but trusted Kusama, whom she respected. Theron said they "fucked it all up" because they did not know how to execute the concept. Audiences polled by CinemaScore gave the film an average grade of "B−" on an A+ to F scale.

Although Peter Chung was initially optimistic about the film and was impressed with the sets, he ultimately described it as "a travesty," adding:

I was unhappy when I read the script four years ago; seeing it projected larger than life in a crowded theatre made me feel helpless, humiliated, and sad. ...[The movie's creators] claim to love the original version; yet they do not extend that faith to their audience. No, they will soften it for the public, which isn't hip enough to appreciate the raw, pure, unadulterated source like they do.

Chung primarily objected to the film's portrayal of Æon and Trevor, and their re-imagined history and relationship. He said, "Ms. Flux does not actually appear in the movie."

Screenwriters Hay and Manfredi said in an interview that the film was re-cut by the studio prior to release, but that the original director's cut contains nearly 30 minutes of additional footage, which Chung acknowledged in his criticism.

== Music ==
Æon Flux - Original Motion Picture Soundtrack

Film score by Graeme Revell
- Released: April 14, 2010
- Genre: Film score
- Length: 48 Minutes
- Label: Varèse Sarabande

Graeme Revell composed the score for Æon Flux; the soundtrack is available via Varèse Sarabande as advertised on the film's official website.

Æon Flux - Original Motion Picture Soundtrack
No.	Title	Length
1.	"Bregna 2415"	4:47
2.	"The Panopticon"	2:33
3.	"Una Flux"	1:14
4.	"Torture Garden"	2:40
5.	"Monican Mission"	1:14
6.	""Good Boys""	2:40
7.	"The Kiss"	3:18
8.	"The Relical and Keeper"	4:22
9.	"Cloning Discovery"	5:15
10.	"Grenade!/Monorail Chase"	3:49
11.	""I Remember""	1:38
12.	"The Cherry Orchard"	3:51
13.	"Oren Goodchild Dies"	3:42
14.	"Destroying the Memories"	4:04
15.	"Æon Flux"	3:34

== Comic book prequel ==
In late 2005, Dark Horse Comics published a four-issue comic book limited series tying in with the movie. The storyline serves as a prequel to the film and is a mixture of Chung's original TV series designs and characters, combined with the setting and story elements of the film; the comic book version of Æon loosely resembles Theron, while her colleague Sithandra, played by a black actress in the film, is depicted as white in the comic book. The first issue sets up Flux's mission for the miniseries: sabotage the Bregnan government's plan to destroy the forest outside of Bregna's walls. The last two issues of the limited series were published after the film had been released. By the time the final issue was published, the film had already ended its run in most areas. Dark Horse has not announced whether additional Æon Flux-based comics will be published.

== Video game ==
On November 15, 2005, a video game tie-in prequel of the same name was released in North America for the PlayStation 2 and Xbox gaming consoles. The game takes place in eras before the film's setting of 2030 to 2338. The likenesses and voices of actors from the film were used. To help add to the box office gross of the film and to sell more games, specially marked copies sold in the US came with a pass to see the Æon Flux film.
