= Maggie Renzi =

Film producer

- Born: Margaret Rose Renzi; November 30, 1951 (age 74); Pittsfield, Massachusetts, USA
- Occupations: Film producer, actress
- Years active: 1979–present
- Partner: John Sayles
- Father: Ralph Renzi

Maggie Renzi (born November 30, 1951) is an American film producer and actress.

== Personal life ==
Renzi attended Williams College, where she met her life partner John Sayles. She graduated from Williams College in 1973.

== Filmography ==
Film
Year	Title	Actor	Producer	Role
1979	Return of the Secaucus 7	Yes		Katie
1983	Lianna	Yes	Yes	Sheila
1984	Swing Shift	Yes		First Interviewer
1984	The Brother from Another Planet	Yes	Yes	Noreen
1985	Key Exchange	Yes		Cosmo Woman #2
1987	Matewan	Yes	Yes	Rosaria
1988	Eight Men Out	Yes		Rose Cicotte
1991	City of Hope	Yes	Yes	Connie
1992	Passion Fish	Yes	Yes	Louise
1994	The Secret of Roan Inish		Yes	
1996	Lone Star		Yes	
1997	Men with Guns	Yes	Yes	Tourist by Pool
1999	Santitos		Yes	
1999	Limbo		Yes	
2000	Girlfight		Yes	
2002	Sunshine State		Yes	
2004	Silver City		Yes	
2007	Honeydripper		Yes	
2007	My Mexican Shivah		Executive	
2010	Amigo		Yes	
