= Larry Brezner =

American film producer

Lawrence Ira "Larry" Brezner (August 23, 1942 – October 5, 2015) was an American film producer, most notable for producing films such as Good Morning, Vietnam, Throw Momma from the Train, and Ride Along.

== Life and career ==
Born in the Bronx in New York City in 1942, Brezner studied at the University of Bridgeport and St. John's University from which he graduated with a master's in psychology. He then was a teacher at an elementary school at PS 47 in the Bronx before he moved on to the entertainment industry. In 1974, he opened a night club in Manhattan, where he met the producer Jack Rollins. In the same year, he joined the company of Rollins & Charles H. Joffe with Buddy Morra and was their partner in the late 1970s. After Rollins and Joffe withdrew from the company, he, Buddy Morra, David Steinberg and Stephen Tenenbaum formed a new company, MBST Entertainment, Inc. (Morra Brezner Steinberg & Tenenbaum). His first wife was the singer Melissa Manchester; they met when she performed at his club, and Brezner managed her career during their seven-year marriage. His second marriage to Bett Zimmerman also ended in divorce.

From the mid-1980s, Brezner served as the executive producer for various comedy specials on US television. Brezner also managed the careers of artists such as Billy Crystal, Robin Williams, Martin Short, Bette Midler, and many other comedic talents.

In 1981, his first film project was the original Arthur; his first project as a film producer in 1984 was Throw Momma from the Train. This was followed by Good Morning, Vietnam, The 'Burbs, and The Vanishing "Krippendorf's Tribe", "The Greatest Game". In 2014, he produced the comedy Ride Along. His final project, Ride Along 2, was released in January 2016.

In 1994, after a stint at 20th Century Fox, the MBST company moved to Turner Pictures, but fell apart due to creative differences, and moved to The Walt Disney Studios.

He died in Duarte, California, on October 5, 2015, from leukemia, which was diagnosed a few months earlier. Brezner is survived by his third wife, Dominique Cohen-Brezner, and two daughters, Lauren Azbill and China Brezner.

== Selected filmography ==
He was a producer in all films unless otherwise noted.

=== Film ===
Year	Film	Credit	Notes
1981	Arthur	Executive producer	Uncredited
1987	Throw Momma from the Train		
1987	Good Morning, Vietnam		
1989	The 'Burbs		
1990	Coupe de Ville		
1992	Passed Away		
1993	The Vanishing		
1994	Angie		
1994	Clifford		
1998	Krippendorf's Tribe		
2000	The Extreme Adventures of Super Dave		Direct-to-video
2001	Freddy Got Fingered		
2002	Sorority Boys		
2004	The Last Shot		
2005	The Greatest Game Ever Played		
2011	Arthur		
2014	Ride Along		Final film as a producer
2016	Ride Along 2		Posthumous credit

Thanks

Year	Film	Role
1992	Crossing the Bridge	Thanks

=== Television ===
Year	Title	Credit	Notes
1980	Good Time Harry	Executive producer	
1981	The Acorn People	Executive producer	Television film
1982	The Billy Crystal Comedy Hour	Executive producer	
1984	Billy Crystal: A Comic's Line	Executive producer	Television special
1985	Martin Short: Concert for the North Americas	Executive producer	Television special
1986	Robin Williams: Live at the Met	Executive producer	Television special
1986	The Young Comedians All-Star Reunion	Executive producer	Television special
1986	But Seriously, Folks	Executive producer	Television short
1987	On Location: Women of the Night	Executive producer	Television special
1987	The 11th Annual Young Comedians	Executive producer	Television special
1988	The 12th Annual Young Comedians Special	Executive producer	Television special
1990	Good Grief	Executive producer	
2008	Little Britain USA	Executive producer	

Thanks

Year	Title	Role	Notes
2002	Robin Williams Live on Broadway	Special thanks	Television special
2009	Robin Williams: Weapons of Self Destruction	Special thanks	Television special
