= Destroyer (2018 film) =

2018 film directed by Karyn Kusama

- Theatrical release poster
- Directed by: Karyn Kusama
- Written by: Phil Hay; Matt Manfredi
- Produced by: Fred Berger; Phil Hay; Matt Manfredi
- Starring: Nicole Kidman; Sebastian Stan; Toby Kebbell; Tatiana Maslany; Bradley Whitford; Jade Pettyjohn; Scoot McNairy
- Cinematography: Julie Kirkwood
- Edited by: Plummy Tucker
- Music by: Theodore Shapiro
- Production companies: 30West; Rocket Science; Automatik Entertainment
- Distributed by: Annapurna Pictures
- Release dates: August 31, 2018 (Telluride); December 25, 2018 (United States)
- Running time: 124 minutes
- Country: United States
- Language: English
- Budget: $9–12.4 million
- Box office: $5.6 million

Destroyer is a 2018 American independent neo-noir crime drama film directed by Karyn Kusama, written and co-produced by Phil Hay and Matt Manfredi, and starring Nicole Kidman with Toby Kebbell, Tatiana Maslany, Scoot McNairy, Bradley Whitford, and Sebastian Stan. The film follows a former undercover police officer (Kidman), who takes revenge against members of a gang, years after her case was blown.

The film had its world premiere at the Telluride Film Festival on August 31, 2018, and was released in the United States on December 25, 2018, by Annapurna Pictures. It received generally positive response from critics, who mainly praised Kidman's performance, but was a box-office disappointment, grossing $5.6 million on a $9–12.4 million budget. At the 76th Golden Globe Awards, Kidman was nominated for Best Actress in a Motion Picture - Drama.

== Plot ==
LAPD detective Erin Bell arrives on the scene of a John Doe murder and suggests to the responding officers that she knows the identity of the murderer.

At the police station, Erin receives an envelope with a $100 bill stained from a dye pack. An FBI contact confirms that the bill is from a bank robbery committed by a California gang 16 years prior that she and her former partner, FBI agent Chris, were embedded in as undercover officers. She tells her superiors that she believes the bill to be proof that the gang's leader, Silas, is once again active.

Erin works her way through the remaining members of the gang to find Silas. She begins with Toby, who had been in prison, but is now terminally ill and living with his mother on compassionate release. She gives him a handjob in exchange for the location of Arturo, a former gang member now offering pro bono legal services to immigrants. Arturo provides Erin with the location of Dennis DiFranco, a lawyer who launders the haul from the original robbery and from whom Erin deduces that Silas is active again because the money is almost gone. After Erin thrashes him, DiFranco gives her the location of the next money drop, which is performed by Silas' girlfriend Petra, who has developed a drug addiction. Erin tracks Petra, eventually intervening in a bank robbery committed by Silas' new gang. Petra and she injure each other in a fight, ending with Erin abducting Petra.

Flashbacks reveal that Erin and Chris developed a romantic relationship while undercover, with Erin becoming pregnant, later having their daughter, Shelby. At Erin's behest, they became actual participants in a bank robbery and planned to take their shares of the heist, report to their superiors that they lost contact with the gang, then eventually quit the force. The robbery was botched when a dye pack exploded and Silas killed the bank teller who had placed it. Chris attempted to intervene and was shot dead by Silas. Erin fled with Toby, not answering his questions if she was a cop. After silencing Toby by crashing the van, Erin hid her share of the heist and returned to policing. She turns to drinking.

In the present, Erin visits Ethan, Shelby's adoptive father, and later talks with Shelby. Erin visits a self storage unit to retrieve her $300,000+ share of the stolen money, but finds that all but $11,000 is stained with dye. Silas sends a text message to Petra's phone saying where to meet him. Erin confronts him and shoots him dead. She returns the next morning to find the police investigating the scene, the John Doe murder investigation depicted in the first scene of the film. With Silas dead, Erin gives evidence of her guilt – where he can find Petra, a stained bill, and the key to her storage unit – to her partner, Antonio. Erin has been bleeding internally from injuries she sustained during a beating by DiFranco's bodyguard and in her fight with Petra. As she sits in her car, a flashback shows her walking in the snow with a young Shelby on her back.

== Cast ==
- Nicole Kidman as LAPD Detective Erin Bell
- Toby Kebbell as Silas Howe
- Tatiana Maslany as Petra
- Scoot McNairy as Ethan
- Beau Knapp as Jay
- Jade Pettyjohn as Shelby Bell
  - Kenley Smyth as Young Shelby Bell
- James Jordan as Toby
- Toby Huss as Gil Lawson
- Zach Villa as Arturo Guerrero
- Shamier Anderson as Antonio
- Bradley Whitford as Dennis DiFranco
- Sebastian Stan as Chris
- Natalia Cordova-Buckley as Detective Gavras
- Kelvin Han Yee as Lieutenant Oshima
- Joseph Fatu as Taz
- Jan Hoag as Toby's mother
- Chris Fiore as Ice Cream Shop Customer

== Production ==
In August 2017, Nicole Kidman entered into talks to star in the film with Karyn Kusama directing, with the casting confirmed in October. Rocket Science helped arrange the financing and international sales. In November, Tatiana Maslany, Sebastian Stan, Bradley Whitford, Toby Kebbell, and Scoot McNairy were added to the cast, and filming commenced in Los Angeles in early December, with the rest of the cast filled out with the additions of Beau Knapp, Jade Pettyjohn, Toby Huss, Zach Villa, and James Jordan.

== Release ==
In May 2018, Annapurna Pictures acquired U.S. distribution rights to the film for mid-seven figures at the Marché du Film in an auction that also included Amazon Studios and Neon. It had its world premiere at the Telluride Film Festival on August 31, 2018. It was also screened at the 2018 Toronto International Film Festival, in the Platform program. It was also screened at AFI Fest on November 13, 2018. It was released on December 25, 2018.

== Reception ==
=== Box office ===
Destroyer made $1.5 million in the United States, and $4 million in other territories, for a worldwide total of $5.5 million.

The film made $58,572 from three theaters in its opening weekend, a six-day total of $115,661.

=== Critical response ===
On review aggregator Rotten Tomatoes, the film holds an approval rating of 74% based on 270 reviews, with an average rating of 6.7/10. The website's critical consensus reads, "Destroyer's grueling narrative is as uncompromising as Nicole Kidman's central performance, which adds extra layers to a challenging film that leaves a lingering impact." On Metacritic, the film has a weighted average score of 62 out of 100, based on 44 critics, indicating "generally favorable" reviews.

Peter Debruge of Variety and Brooke Marine of W both found Kidman "unrecognizable" in the role and Debruge added, "she disappears into an entirely new skin, rearranging her insides to fit the character's tough hide", whereas Marine highlighted Kidman's method acting.

=== Accolades ===
Award	Date of ceremony	Category	Recipients	Result	Ref.
Golden Globes	January 6, 2019	Best Actress in a Motion Picture – Drama	Nicole Kidman	Nominated	
Los Angeles Online Film Critics Society	January 9, 2019	Best Actress	Nicole Kidman	Nominated	
Satellite Awards	February 17, 2019	Best Actress in Motion Picture – Drama	Nicole Kidman	Nominated	
Noir Film Festival	December 9, 2018	Special Mention	Nicole Kidman	Won	
Noir Film Festival	December 9, 2018	Black Lion	Destroyer	Nominated	
Nevada Film Critics Society	December 19, 2018	Best Actress (tied with Toni Collette for Hereditary)	Nicole Kidman	Won	
