= Ride Along 2 =

2016 film by Tim Story

- Theatrical release poster
- Directed by: Tim Story
- Written by: Phil Hay; Matt Manfredi
- Based on: Characters by Greg Coolidge
- Produced by: Will Packer; Ice Cube; Matt Alvarez; Larry Brezner
- Starring: Kevin Hart; Ice Cube; Ken Jeong; Benjamin Bratt; Olivia Munn; Bruce McGill; Tika Sumpter
- Cinematography: Mitchell Amundsen
- Edited by: Peter S. Elliot
- Music by: Christopher Lennertz
- Production companies: Will Packer Productions; Cube Vision
- Distributed by: Universal Pictures
- Release dates: January 6, 2016 (Miami); January 15, 2016 (United States)
- Running time: 101 minutes
- Country: United States
- Language: English
- Budget: $40 million
- Box office: $124.6 million

Ride Along 2 is a 2016 American action comedy film that is the sequel to the 2014 film Ride Along, with Kevin Hart and Ice Cube reprising their roles. It was directed by Tim Story and written by Phil Hay and Matt Manfredi. It also stars Ken Jeong, Benjamin Bratt, Olivia Munn, Bruce McGill and Tika Sumpter.

Universal Pictures released the film on January 15, 2016, and was generally panned by most critics, but, like its predecessor, was a box office success, grossing $124.6 million worldwide during its theatrical run against a $40 million budget.

== Plot ==
Hacker A.J. is reviewing a list on the computer on crime lord Antonio Pope's boat, when Pope calls Port Commissioner Griffin, accusing him of stealing. He denies it, but Pope orders a hit on him, then tasks A.J. to find who took his money.

Two years after the first film, James is with partner Detective Mayfield, busting drug dealer Troy. He pulls a gun on James so Ben, watching this on camera, comes to help. He threatens Troy by acting tough, only to drop his badge. A shootout leads to Mayfield getting shot and Troy escaping. When James and Ben chase him, Ben nearly gets run over. James captures Troy in a parking garage, finding on him a flash drive.

Mayfield is hospitalized, and Lt. Brooks sends James to Miami to discover who Troy works for. Ben wants to go to prove he is ready for detective work, but nobody believes in him as he just caused such a mess. However, Angela convinces James to take him, as he is interfering with the wedding planning. So, they drive down to Miami.

Trying to use homicide detective Maya Cruz's computer without permission, she punishes Ben. Later, when they find A.J., he says a safe in a club contains something important, but first they have to meet someone there. There, they find out the man is also Pope's hitman. A.J. creates a distraction to escape while James has a shoot-out with the hitman. Afterwards, with Maya they find the safe empty. Before they can take James' car, he realizes there is a bomb and it explodes.

Realizing he has A.J.'s phone, Ben contacts his girlfriend Tasha to locate him. He convinces her to cooperate by showing her A.J.'s been hooking up with other women. When they find A.J., they bring him in on the investigation. He reveals that Pope is the real crook, despite his public image as an entrepreneur working with the new port commissioner, Nuñez. The team is at the home of Maya's friend/associate Alonso, whom Ben accidentally shoots. Nevertheless, Alonso confirms that Pope is a crook.

James, Ben and Maya go to a party in Pope's mansion. Maya distracts him dancing while James and Ben gather info, with A.J.'s help. After narrowly escaping the alligator Marcus, Ben rejoins the team. They get their information, but Pope shows he knows they are cops, but lets them go. They use the information to locate a group of shipping trucks that may be carrying Pope's contraband. However, the first truck they stop at the port is empty. Hernandez scolds them, as Pope shows up and acts angry for 'unjustifyingly' stopping it.

Going over what went wrong together in a bar, Maya wonders how Nuñez showed up so fast at the port. When A.J. mentions Nuñez is on Pope's payroll, James realizes it was a decoy, and the real contraband is being brought in somewhere else at the port. James, Maya and A.J. go after Pope, but leave Ben handcuffed to a pole. He breaks free, going to Alonso's to remove the cuffs.

James, Maya and A.J. are at the port in the morning to catch Pope. Ben arrives to the shoot-out, exploding a container full of flammable barrels. Pope escapes in a truck, taking A.J. hostage. When James does not find Pope in the truck, Pope shoots at him, but Ben jumps in the way of the bullet. James shoots Pope a few times then, as Ben is wearing a bulletproof vest, he uses him as a human shield when he shoots again. Maya shoots Pope down.

James and Ben are commended for apprehending Pope and Nuñez. They drive home to Atlanta for the wedding in a yellow Lamborghini Maya got for them. Ben and Angela get married and are ready to go off on a speed boat, when Ben asks James to make a speech. Reluctantly, he says that while Ben has gotten him into a lot of trouble since meeting, he has also saved his life, made Angela very happy, and helped him grow into a better man and cop. Ben and Angela then leave on the boat, but he flies out of it when he hits a wake, amusing James.

== Cast ==
- Kevin Hart as Ben Barber
- Ice Cube as James Payton
- Ken Jeong as A.J. Jenkins
- Benjamin Bratt as Antonio Pope
- Olivia Munn as Detective Maya Cruz
- Carlos Gomez as Captain Hernandez
- Bruce McGill as Lieutenant Brooks
- Tika Sumpter as Angela Payton-Barber
- James Martin Kelly as Port Commissioner Griffin
- Robert Pralgo as Port Commissioner Nunez
- Glen Powell as Troy
- Sherri Shepherd as Cori
- Nadine Velazquez as Tasha
- Tyrese Gibson as Detective Mayfield
- Arturo Del Puerto as Alonso
- Michael Rose as The Hitter/Gates
- Utkarsh Ambudkar as Amir
- Bresha Webb as Shayla

== Production ==
=== Development ===
On April 23, 2013, nine months prior to the first film's release, the studio announced that there would be a sequel to the film, with the script written by Phil Hay and Matt Manfredi. On February 18, 2014, it was announced that after the success of the first Ride Along film, Universal was moving forward with its sequel, with Tim Story returning to direct. Ice Cube and Hart were set to reprise their roles, Phil Hay and Matt Manfredi finalized the script, and production was set to start in late June or early July 2014. Benjamin Bratt joined the film's cast, and Variety stated that this installment would have its two stars traveling to Miami for fun, chaos, and shenanigans. On July 16, Glen Powell joined the cast of the film. On July 28, Sherri Shepherd joined the cast.

=== Filming ===
Principal photography on the film began on July 7, 2014, in Miami, Florida. After a week of shooting in Miami, production shifted to Fort Lauderdale, Florida on July 14, where they filmed through July 21. Then filming took place in Miami again, through the end of July, and then production moved to Atlanta, where the first part of the film was shot. In Atlanta, after preparations began on July 24 for filming scenes at 55 Park Place, filming started on July 28, and was shot at 55 Park Place through August 4. Principal photography ended on September 16, 2014.

== Release ==
On March 13, 2014, Universal set the film's release date as January 15, 2016. The first official trailer for Ride Along 2 was released on August 13, 2015, and was attached to screenings of Universal's Straight Outta Compton.

=== Home media ===
Ride Along 2 was released on DVD and Blu-ray on April 26, 2016.

== Music ==
The movie features exclusive unreleased songs from Pitbull, Wahin, DJ Ricky Luna and Major Lazer.

== Reception ==
=== Box office ===
Ride Along 2 grossed $90.9 million in North America and $33.4 million in other territories, for a worldwide total of $124.3 million, against a budget of $40 million.

The film was released in North America on January 15, 2016, alongside 13 Hours: The Secret Soldiers of Benghazi and Norm of the North. The film was projected to gross $40–45 million over the four-day Martin Luther King Jr. weekend, and become the first film to overtake Star Wars: The Force Awakens for number one at the weekend box office. The film made $1.3 million from its Thursday night previews, improving on the $1.1 million of the original. Ride Along 2 went on to gross $35.2 million in its opening weekend and $41 million for the four-day MLK Holiday weekend, lower than its predecessor's $48.6 million four-day MLK Holiday opening two years prior, but still finished first at the box office. The film fell 64.7% to $12.4 million in its second weekend, compared to the 48% sophomore drop of the first film.

=== Critical response ===
On Rotten Tomatoes the film has an approval rating of 15% based on 116 reviews, with an average rating of 3.90/10. The site's critical consensus reads, "Ride Along 2 presents a cop-comedy sequel whose well-matched stars can't break the law of diminishing returns -- or lock up a script that unabashedly steals from the original." On Metacritic, the film has a weighted average score of 32 out of 100, based on 29 critics, indicating "generally unfavorable reviews". Audiences polled by CinemaScore gave the film an average grade of "B+" on an A+ to F scale, while PostTrak reported filmgoers gave it an 80% overall positive score and a 57% "definite recommend".

Justin Chang of Variety magazine called it "Another tired, witless and potentially lucrative attempt to spin an exhausted buddy-cop template into action-comedy gold."

=== Accolades ===
Award	Category	Recipient	Result	Ref.
Teen Choice Awards	Choice Movie: Comedy		Won	
Teen Choice Awards	Choice Movie Actor: Comedy	Ice Cube	Nominated	
Teen Choice Awards	Choice Movie Actor: Comedy	Kevin Hart	Nominated	
Teen Choice Awards	Choice Movie: Hissy Fit	Kevin Hart	Nominated	
2017 Kids' Choice Awards	BFFs	Kevin Hart & Ice Cube	Nominated	

== Future ==
In October 2016, Tim Story, who directed the first two films, announced that a third film is currently in development with Ice Cube and Kevin Hart set to reprise their roles. The film would begin development anew in 2026 with Daniel Gold writing the script.
