= R.I.P.D. =

2013 film by Robert Schwentke

- Theatrical release poster
- Directed by: Robert Schwentke
- Screenplay by: Phil Hay; Matt Manfredi
- Story by: David Dobkin; Phil Hay; Matt Manfredi
- Based on: R.I.P.D. by: Peter M. Lenkov; Lucas Marangon
- Produced by: Neal H. Moritz; Mike Richardson; Michael Fottrell
- Starring: Jeff Bridges; Ryan Reynolds; Kevin Bacon; Mary-Louise Parker; Stéphanie Szostak
- Cinematography: Alwin Küchler
- Edited by: Mark Helfrich
- Music by: Christophe Beck
- Production companies: Universal Pictures; Original Film; Dark Horse Entertainment
- Distributed by: Universal Pictures
- Release dates: July 17, 2013 (Iceland); July 19, 2013 (United States)
- Running time: 96 minutes
- Country: United States
- Language: English
- Budget: $130–154 million
- Box office: $78.3 million

R.I.P.D. (marketed as R.I.P.D.: Rest in Peace Department) is a 2013 American supernatural action comedy film starring Jeff Bridges and Ryan Reynolds. The film was directed by Robert Schwentke from a screenplay by Phil Hay and Matt Manfredi, based on the 1999 comic book R.I.P.D. by Peter M. Lenkov and Lucas Marangon. The film also stars Kevin Bacon, Mary-Louise Parker, Stéphanie Szostak, and Marisa Miller. The story follows a murdered detective who is recruited in the afterlife to work for an agency whose duty is to capture souls that evade judgement, he is partnered with an Old West lawman and discovers a mysterious conspiracy.

The film was originally set to be released on June 28, 2013 in the United States by Universal Pictures, but was pushed back to July 19, 2013. The film underperformed at the box office, grossing $78.3 million on a $130–154 million budget, and received generally negative reviews from critics. It was released on DVD and Blu-ray on October 29, 2013. A direct-to-video prequel, R.I.P.D. 2: Rise of the Damned, was released on November 15, 2022.

== Plot ==
Boston Police Detectives Nick Walker and Bobby Hayes steal a stash of gold during a drug bust. Nick regrets the theft and tells Hayes that he will turn it in as evidence. Hayes shoots and kills Nick at the next drug bust.

After getting shot, Nick finds himself drawn into a vortex, depositing him in an office. Nick meets Mildred Proctor, who explains that he is dead and is headed to judgment. She recruits him into the R.I.P.D (Rest In Peace Department), whose job is to find and capture Deados—the souls of people who died but escaped judgment. Nick is partnered with Roycephus "Roy" Pulsipher, a lawman from the Old West. Roy takes Nick to watch his own funeral and Nick talks to his widowed wife, Julia, but she does not recognize him. Roy explains that the universe had all R.I.P.D. officers' appearance changed and are blocked from revealing their true identities. While he and Nick look normal to each other and R.I.P.D., Nick appears as an elderly Asian man while Roy appears to be a beautiful blonde woman.

Roy takes Nick to question a suspected Deado named Stanley. They ask Stanley questions until he "pops" and is exposed as a Deado. Stanley tries to escape and throws up a bunch of gold he swallowed before being shot by Roy. Roy and Nick argue and Nick throws Roy in front of a bus, causing Roy to lose his favorite cowboy hat. They return to headquarters and book the gold as evidence. Nick wants to investigate the gold further and asks Roy to take him to an informant. Roy takes Nick to meet a Deado named Elliot, who claims the gold is junk. Nick leaves the gold with Elliot and watches as he gives it to Nick's old partner Hayes. Roy and Nick tail Hayes to Nick's house and watch him dig up Nick's gold before following Hayes to the airport. Hayes gives the gold to a Deado named Pulaski who gets stopped by Roy and Nick while leaving.

Pulaski refuses to talk and instead pops himself, becoming a hulking monster, which leads Nick and Roy on a public chase that ends with Nick getting the gold but Pulaski escaping. Nick and Roy return to headquarters and book the gold before being taken to Eternal Affairs to be punished for Pulaski's escaping. They learn that gold is part of an artifact called the Staff of Jericho, which can reverse the tunnel to the afterlife. Nick and Roy have been placed on administrative leave until a hearing can be held to determine their suitability for duty.

Nick leaves and tries to reveal himself to Julia, but she runs away from him. Roy and Nick argue again but make up after Nick apologizes. They decide to track down the rest of the gold despite their suspensions. They confront Hayes at home and he reveals he is a Deado. They arrest him and seize the rest of the gold; however, at headquarters, Hayes triggers a device that freezes R.I.P.D. officers while the Deados steal the gold back and escape.

The Deados block off the streets and begin assembling the Staff of Jericho on the roof of a building. Nick and Roy fight their way to the building as Hayes fatally wounds Julia to use her blood to power the Staff. The dead begin to rain down on Earth as Nick distracts Hayes and Roy destroys the Staff. The vortex closes and Nick shoots Hayes, erasing him from existence. Nearly dying, Julia sees Nick's true self. They share a passionate goodbye, and Nick tells her to move on with her life without him.

Julia wakes up in the hospital where Proctor, who appears as a doctor, checks on her. Proctor then tells Nick and Roy that Eternal Affairs had their hearings without them. Nick is given a warning while Roy has fifty-three more years added to his service, much to his outrage until Proctor returns his cowboy hat. Roy gives Nick a new identity and Nick is excited until he sees that he now appears as a Girl Scout wearing an orthodontic headgear.

== Cast ==
- Jeff Bridges as Roycephus "Roy" Pulsipher, a self-described lawman in the Old West and veteran officer of the R.I.P.D. Roy prefers to work alone and often runs afoul of Proctor, his supervisor and a former lover. Roy was also killed by his partner and obsesses over how he died.
- Ryan Reynolds as Nick Walker, a Boston Police detective who is murdered by his partner and recruited into the R.I.P.D.
- Mary-Louise Parker as Mildred Proctor: Supervisor of the R.I.P.D. At some point in the past, she was in a relationship with Roy, who seems to resent her promotion to Supervisor.
- Kevin Bacon as Bobby Hayes, a corrupt Boston Police detective and Nick's partner. Hayes is secretly a Deado who was killed in a drug raid but escaped judgment.
- Stéphanie Szostak as Julia Walker, Nick's widow who is sacrificed by Hayes to power the Staff of Jericho.
- Marisa Miller as FBI Special Agent Opal Pavlenko, an FBI Agent and Roy's avatar.
- James Hong as Grandpa Jerry Chen, a retired Boston Police Department Captain from 1995 and Nick's first avatar.
- Devin Ratray as Pulaski (nicknamed by Nick: "Fat Elvis"), a Fat Businessman Deado who helps Hayes collect the gold for the Staff of Jericho. As an exposed Deado he has the ability to defy gravity, running up the side of a building and jumping sideways to break a window.
- Robert Knepper as Stanley Nawicki, the first Deado Nick encounters as Roy's partner. Stanley denies being a Deado before failing the card test and is erased after trying to escape.
- Mike O'Malley as Elliot, Fenway Park's scoreboard operator and a Deado. Roy allows him to avoid judgment in exchange for his work as an informant. He is erased during the final battle after helping Hayes.
- Larry Joe Campbell as Officer Murphy
- Piper Mackenzie Harris as Girl Scout, Nick's second avatar
- Toby Huss, Mike Judge, and Jon Olson as Various Deado Voices

== Production ==
In April 2006, following the success of Wedding Crashers, director David Dobkin was set to helm an adaptation of the comic book R.I.P.D. for Universal Pictures, with Phil Hay and Matt Manfredi hired to write the screenplay. In September 2010, Universal officially greenlit the film, with Dobkin dropping out and Robert Schwentke directing instead, with Ryan Reynolds in the lead role. The following April, Jeff Bridges entered talks to star as the co-lead in the film following Zach Galifianakis turning down the role. In July of that year, Kevin Bacon was cast to play the villain, with Stephanie Szostak and Mary-Louise Parker rounding out the cast in August, after Jodie Foster had been considered for the role of Proctor. Filming completed on January 18, 2012.

== Music ==
The soundtrack to RIPD, composed by Christophe Beck, was released on July 16, 2013.

No.	Title	Length
1.	"R.I.P.D."	0:58
2.	"The Ascent"	2:13
3.	"Elevator Chase"	1:58
4.	"Orientation"	2:25
5.	"Evidence Room"	1:25
6.	"Partners"	0:59
7.	"Nick's Funeral"	1:47
8.	"A Closer Look"	2:05
9.	"Nawiki"	1:59
10.	"A Powerful Artifact"	1:59
11.	"First Vortex"	0:39
12.	"Fat Elvis"	1:09
13.	"Raining Cars"	2:19
14.	"Hunting Hayes"	1:22
15.	"Track Ghost"	1:38
16.	"High Noon"	1:14
17.	"Half Spheres"	1:21
18.	"House Wrecked"	1:15
19.	"Icy Hot Partner"	1:10
20.	"Mano a Mano"	1:42
21.	"Goodbye"	1:52
22.	"Roy's Hat"	1:14
23.	"The Better Man (performed by Jeff Bridges)"	4:15
Total length:		38:58

== Release ==
R.I.P.D. was released by Universal Pictures on July 19, 2013, in the United States. The film was originally set to be released on June 28, 2013.

=== Home media ===
Universal Pictures Home Entertainment released R.I.P.D. on DVD, Blu-ray and Blu-ray 3D on October 29, 2013, and on Ultra HD Blu-ray on December 6, 2022.

=== Marketing ===
On July 16, Adult Swim's YouTube channel uploaded an animated prequel short, which was produced by Titmouse, Inc. and featured the voice work of Reynolds and Bridges.

=== Video game ===
Atlus published a video game based on the film, R.I.P.D. The Game, was released on July 16, 2013, for Microsoft Windows, PlayStation 3, and Xbox 360. The game is a co-op third-person shooter, set around a survival mode. It was developed by Old School Games and features gameplay similar to their previous game, God Mode. Like its film counterpart, R.I.P.D. The Game received mostly negative reviews.

== Reception ==
=== Box office ===
The film grossed only $12.7 million in its opening weekend and ended its theatrical run with $78.3 million worldwide, including a $33.6 million domestic total and $44.7 million in other territories. According to Deadline.com, the budget was more than the $130 million the studio claimed, and was $154 million even after $28.1 million in tax rebates. The film is considered a box-office bomb.

=== Critical response ===
R.I.P.D. received generally negative reviews from critics. On Rotten Tomatoes the film has an approval rating of 13% based on 103 reviews with an average rating of 3.7/10. The site's critical consensus reads, "It has its moments — most of them courtesy of Jeff Bridges' rootin' tootin' performance as an undead Wild West sheriff — but R.I.P.D. is ultimately too dim-witted and formulaic to satisfy." On Metacritic, the film has a score of 25 out of 100 based on 27 critics, indicating "generally unfavorable reviews". Audiences polled by CinemaScore gave the film an average grade of "C+" on an A+ to F scale.

Film critic Roger Moore gave the film one-and-a-half out of four stars, calling it "the worst comic book adaptation since Jonah Hex."

== Prequel ==
In August 2022, it was announced that a prequel reboot film titled R.I.P.D. 2: Rise of the Damned had been filmed, produced by Universal Home Entertainment. The film was released directly to Blu-ray and DVD on November 15, 2022, and stars Jeffrey Donovan as Roy Pulsipher, Penelope Mitchell as Jeanne, Jake Choi, Richard Brake, and Kerry Knuppe. Paste gave it a negative review.

On the review aggregator website, Rotten Tomatoes, the film has an approval rating of 20% based on 5 reviews.
