= The School for Good and Evil (soundtrack) =

The School for Good and Evil (Soundtrack from the Netflix Film)

Film score by Theodore Shapiro
- Released: October 19, 2022
- Recorded: 2022
- Studio: AIR Studios, London; Sofia Session Studios, Sofia; Elbo Studios, Glendale, California
- Genre: Film soundtrack
- Length: 72:52
- Label: Netflix Music
- Producer: Joseph Shirley

Theodore Shapiro chronology
The Good House (2022)	The School for Good and Evil (2022)	Trolls Band Together (2023)

Singles from The School for Good and Evil (Soundtrack from the Netflix Film)
- 1. "Who Do You Think You Are" Released: October 7, 2022

The School for Good and Evil (Soundtrack from the Netflix Film) is the soundtrack to the 2022 film The School for Good and Evil. Directed by Paul Feig, it is based on the 2013 novel of the same name by Soman Chainani. The film score is composed by Theodore Shapiro which consisted of an epic pop music combining medieval instrumentations, orchestra along with electronic music. The 23-track album was released through Netflix Music on October 19, 2022, featuring Shapiro's score and an end credits song "Who Do You Think You Are", previously released as a single.

== Development ==
In May 2022, it was announced that Theodore Shapiro would compose music for The School for Good and Evil in his fifth collaboration with Feig. Before the production began, Feig created a reel of visual ideas based on couture-inspired costumes and the reel was set to an indie rock song, which led Shapiro to set a sonic palette that "would have a youthful energy and point of view". Musically, the film required a huge orchestral score to be cinematic and epic, but Shapiro tried to keep the modern pop sensibilities alive. He combined a large orchestra with baroque harpsichords, medieval instruments, chord progressions and modern music programming, to create an "epic pop" score.

As the film had a timeless quality, Shapiro wanted to curate a sound that span the ages. He used medieval instruments such as recorders and frame drums, along with baroque harpischord and pipe organ that represented the 20th century sounds. Combining these with electronics, Shapiro wanted to convey the idea of timelessness by "making a big musical gumbo with all of these references colliding with one another."

The theme for the school for good was "straight-ahead nobility and beauty" with minor chromatic quirks, while the theme for the school for evil "got more fun toys in its music". He underlined it with a Bulgarian choir singing in a balkan style that provided a color for that theme, and when these schools were together, both themes were played simultaneously in counterpoint with one another. The score accompanied numerous themes and Shapiro refrained from too many thematic clutters, hence those themes were also used for representing key characters as well.

== Release ==
An original song for the film, "Who Do You Think You Are", performed by Kiana Ledé and Cautious Clay was released as a single on October 7, 2022. The soundtrack was released through Netflix Music on October 19, the same day as the film.

== Track listing ==
No.	Title	Length
1.	"Family Duel and Sophie's Dream Waltz"	5:47
2.	"Everything's Just Fine"	2:52
3.	"The Stymph"	3:02
4.	"Smells Like Cake"	1:02
5.	"Good and Evil Orientation"	2:07
6.	"Tedros and the Everboys"	1:08
7.	"Cyclops Fight"	3:15
8.	"Tower of Blood"	1:59
9.	"Gregor's Third Fail"	2:32
10.	"Hester and the Dragon Tattoo"	5:16
11.	"Wish Fish"	6:32
12.	"Fingerglow"	1:39
13.	"Trial by Tale"	3:10
14.	"The Pumpkin Patch"	2:38
15.	"The Ever Ball"	4:23
16.	"Turned to Dolls"	1:40
17.	"The Witches' Transformation"	2:29
18.	"Things in Between"	1:01
19.	"Never After"	6:48
20.	"Cloud of Feathers"	3:43
21.	"True Love"	3:00
22.	"Going Home"	3:18
23.	"Who Do You Think You Are" (Kiana Ledé and Cautious Clay)	3:31
Total length:		72:52

== Reception ==
Peter Debruge of Variety and David Rooney of The Hollywood Reporter called it "functional" and "symphonic". Mark Feeney of The Boston Globe wrote "The one thing to be said for Theodore Shapiro’s muscularly egregious score is that the music makes it marginally easier to miss what the characters are saying." Vinayak Chakravorty of Firstpost noted that the background score "you’d feel you’ve heard once too often". Reviewing for the musical piece "The Stymph", Owen Danoff of Screen Rant said that it was "reminiscent of some of Theodore Shapiro's action work in films like Tropic Thunder and 2016's Ghostbusters, with a whimsical edge that firmly roots it in the fantastical world of The School for Good and Evil. Driving percussion and soaring vocals pair with horns and the rest of the orchestra to create a soundscape that is at times suspenseful and at times triumphant."

== Additional music ==
The following are the list of songs featured in the film, but not included in the soundtrack:

- "Prelude No. 1 in C Major, BWV 846: Well-Tempered Klavier" by Johann Sebastian Bach, performed by Erica Goodman
- "Evergirls Hymn" by Theodore Shapiro and Paul Feig
- "Rock & Roll Queen" by the Subways
- "Brutal" by Olivia Rodrigo
- "You Should See Me in a Crown" by Billie Eilish
- "Toxic" by 2WEI
- "Space Man" by Sam Ryder
- "Here Comes Trouble" by Striking Vipers
- "Ready For It" by Rayelle

== Personnel ==
Credits adapted from liner notes:

- Music by: Theodore Shapiro
- Music supervisor: Erica Weis
- Score produced by: Joseph Shirley
- Music designer: Chris Lane
- Music editors: Paul Chandler, Thomas Dreschner
- Orchestration: Mark Graham, Jeff Kryka, Tommy Laurence, Geoff Lawson
- Music preparation: JoAnn Kane Music Service
- Orchestra conducted by: Gavin Greenaway
- Additional conductor: Mark Graham
- Score recorded by: Nick Wollage, Chris Fogel
- Digital score recordist: John Prestage
- Score mixed by: Chris Fogel
- Assistant mix engineer: Colby Donaldson
- Technical score engineer: Felipe Pacheco
- Score programmer: Prateek Rajagopal
- Recording assistant: Jedidiah Rimell
- Music librarian: Dave Hage
- Score editor; Chris Barrett
- Orchestra leader: Thomas Bowes
- Orchestra contractors: Lucy Whalley and Jenny Goshawk for Isobel Griffiths Ltd.
- Choirmasters: Terry Edwards, Ben Parry
- Choir contractor: Jasper Randall
- Choir: London Voices, Reid Bruton, Grace Davidson, Allie Feder, William Kenneth Goldman, Joanna Goldsmith-Eteson, Bri Holland, Sudumu Jayatilaka, Baraka May, Jenna Lea Rosen, Steve Trowell
- Sofia choir: Sofia Session Orchestra
- Score recorded at: Air Lyndhurst Studios, London and Sofia Session Studio, Sofia
- Score mixed at: Elbo Studios, Glendale, California
- Music clearances: Christine Bergren, Alexa Collazo
- Bass: Steve Mair, Laurence Ungless
- Celeste: David Arch
- Cello: Vicky Matthews
- French horn: Richard Bissill, Diego Incertis
- Viola: Rachel Bolt, Clifton Harrison
- Violin: Mark Berrow, Perry Montague-Mason, Everton Nelson, Tom Pigott Smith

== Accolades ==
Awards and nominations received by The School for Good and Evil
Award	Date of ceremony	Category	Recipient(s)	Result	Ref.
MTV Movie & TV Awards	May 7, 2023	Best Musical Moment	"You Should See Me in a Crown"	Nominated	
