= Bug (2002 film) =

- DVD cover
- Directed by: Phil Hay; Matt Manfredi
- Written by: Matt Manfredi
- Produced by: Brian Gerber; Lysa Hayland
- Starring: John Carroll Lynch; Brian Cox; Jamie Kennedy; Sarah Paulson; Christina Kirk; Chris Bauer; Megan Cavanagh
- Cinematography: Scott Kevan
- Edited by: John Binninger
- Music by: Theodore Shapiro
- Production company: Curb Entertainment
- Distributed by: Wellspring Media
- Release date: February 28, 2002
- Running time: 86 minutes
- Country: United States
- Language: English

Bug is a 2002 American comedy film, directed by Phil Hay and Matt Manfredi. It was released on February 28, 2002.

== Plot ==
A young boy steps on a bug, killing it. A man getting into his car witnesses the senseless murder and crosses the street to chastise the boy. In the extra minute this takes, his parking meter expires and a meter maid is right there to issue a ticket. The now angry man throws the ticket into the storm drain. The ticket clogs a pipe, causing water damage elsewhere. This series of cause-and-effect chain reactions propels an eclectic group of individuals in Silver Lake, Los Angeles, to a common destiny.

== Cast ==
As credited, in order of appearance:

- John Carroll Lynch
- Megan Cavanagh
- Grant Heslov
- Brian Cox
- Alexis Cruz
- Jamie Kennedy
- Sarah Paulson
- Ed Begley Jr.
- Phil Hay
- Jon Huertas
- Alexandra Wescourt
- Christopher Thornton
- Steven Shenbaum
- Chris Bauer
- Christina Kirk
- Hedy Burress
- John Doe
- John Lehr
- Kent Faulcon
- Juliette Jeffers
- Jim Ortlieb
- Matt Manfredi
- Trudie Styler
- Dearbhla Molloy
- Guy Siner
- Michael Hitchcock
- Arabella Field
- Judy Prescott
- Wade Williams
- Maz Jobrani
- Carol Locatell
- Benjamin John Parrillo
- Bellina Logan
