= Teen Choice Award for Choice Hissy Fit =

Teen Choice Award

- Description: Awarded to actors for an onscreen meltdown
- Country: United States
- Presented by: Teen Choice Awards
- Reward: Surfboard

The following is a list of Teen Choice Award winners and nominees for Choice Hissy Fit. This is awarded to actors of any gender for their performance of an onscreen meltdown and is chosen by 13–19 year olds. From its inception in 1999, it was an award exclusively given out for film work but in 2017, it began recognizing work in television as well.

== Winners ==
| Year | Winner | Film | Other nominees | Ref. |
|---|---|---|---|---|
| 1999 | Sandra Bullock | Forces of Nature | Leonardo DiCaprio – Celebrity; Joseph Gordon-Levitt – 10 Things I Hate About You; Lisa Kudrow – The Opposite of Sex; Ewan McGregor – Star Wars: Episode I – The Phantom Menace; Ryan Phillippe – Cruel Intentions; Jason Schwartzman – Rushmore; Reese Witherspoon – Election | |
| 2000 | Lisa Kudrow | Hanging Up | Rosanna Arquette – The Whole Nine Yards; Joan Cusack – Toy Story 2; John Cusack – High Fidelity; Cameron Diaz – Any Given Sunday; Angelina Jolie – Girl, Interrupted; Jodi Lyn O'Keefe – Whatever It Takes; Ben Stiller – Mystery Men | |
| 2001 | Jim Carrey | How the Grinch Stole Christmas | Sandra Bullock – Miss Congeniality; Courteney Cox – 3000 Miles to Graceland; Vin Diesel – The Fast and the Furious; Angelina Jolie – Lara Croft: Tomb Raider; Ashton Kutcher – Dude, Where's My Car?; Mark Wahlberg – Planet of the Apes; Reese Witherspoon – Legally Blonde | |
| 2002 | Ben Stiller | Zoolander | Cate Blanchett – The Lord of the Rings: The Fellowship of the Ring; Hayden Christensen – Star Wars: Episode II – Attack of the Clones; Willem Dafoe – Spider-Man; Cameron Diaz – The Sweetest Thing; Josh Hartnett – 40 Days and 40 Nights; Samantha Morton – Minority Report; Will Smith – Men in Black II | |
| 2003 | Adam Sandler | Anger Management | Sandra Bullock – Two Weeks Notice; Michael Constantine – My Big Fat Greek Wedding; Kate Hudson – How to Lose a Guy in 10 Days; Ashton Kutcher – Just Married; Lucy Liu – Chicago; Steve Martin – Bringing Down the House; Jack Nicholson – Anger Management | |
| 2004 | Lindsay Lohan | Freaky Friday | Jason Biggs – American Wedding; Jennifer Garner – 13 Going on 30; Topher Grace – Win a Date with Tad Hamilton!; Ashton Kutcher – Cheaper by the Dozen; Rachel McAdams – Mean Girls; Mandy Moore – Saved!; Ben Stiller – Along Came Polly | |
| 2005 | Jon Heder | Napoleon Dynamite | Courteney Cox – The Longest Yard; Jimmy Fallon – Fever Pitch; Will Ferrell – Kicking & Screaming; America Ferrera – The Sisterhood of the Traveling Pants; Jane Fonda – Monster-in-Law; Ashton Kutcher – Guess Who; Queen Latifah – Beauty Shop | |
| 2006 | Keira Knightley | Pirates of the Caribbean: Dead Man's Chest | Anna Faris – Just Friends; Isla Fisher – Wedding Crashers; King Kong – King Kong; Lindsay Lohan – Just My Luck; Adam Sandler – Click | |
| 2007 | Ryan Seacrest | Knocked Up | Jessica Alba – Fantastic Four: Rise of the Silver Surfer; Steve Carell – Evan Almighty; Cameron Diaz – The Holiday; Will Ferrell – Blades of Glory | |
| 2009 | Miley Cyrus | Hannah Montana: The Movie | Jim Carrey – Yes Man; Robert Downey Jr. – Tropic Thunder; Kate Hudson – Bride Wars; Hugh Jackman – X-Men Origins: Wolverine | |
| 2010 | Miley Cyrus | The Last Song | Jessica Biel – Valentine's Day; Sean Combs – Get Him to the Greek; Giovanni Ribisi – Avatar; Vince Vaughn – Couples Retreat | |
| 2011 | Ed Helms | The Hangover Part II | Robert Downey Jr. – Due Date; Bruce Greenwood – Super 8; Mark Wahlberg – The Other Guys; Kristen Wiig – Bridesmaids | |
| 2012 | Charlize Theron | Snow White and the Huntsman | Steve Carell – Crazy, Stupid, Love; Kevin Hart – Think Like a Man; Jonah Hill & Channing Tatum – 21 Jump Street; Mark Ruffalo – The Avengers | |
| 2013 | Taylor Lautner | Grown Ups 2 | Anna Camp, Hana Mae Lee, Brittany Snow and Rebel Wilson – Pitch Perfect; Steve Carell – Despicable Me 2; Melissa McCarthy – The Heat; Channing Tatum – White House Down | |
| 2014 | Jonah Hill | 22 Jump Street | Godzilla – Godzilla; Kevin Hart – Ride Along; Nick Frost – The World's End; Ice Cube – 22 Jump Street; Jason Sudeikis – We're the Millers | |
| 2015 | Anna Kendrick | Pitch Perfect 2 | Lewis Black – Inside Out; Bryce Dallas Howard – Jurassic World; Melissa McCarthy – Spy; Reese Witherspoon – Hot Pursuit; Charlie Day – Horrible Bosses 2 | |
| 2016 | Ryan Reynolds | Deadpool | Adam Driver – Star Wars: The Force Awakens; Zac Efron – Neighbors 2: Sorority Rising; Kevin Hart – Ride Along 2; Hugh Jackman – X-Men: Apocalypse; Jason Sudeikis – The Angry Birds Movie | |
| 2017 | Madelaine Petsch | Riverdale | Anthony Anderson – Black-ish; Malcolm Barrett – Timeless; Luke Evans – Beauty and the Beast; Kurt Russell – Guardians of the Galaxy Vol. 2; Dan Stevens – Beauty and the Beast | |
| 2018 | Madelaine Petsch | Riverdale | Jack Black – Jumanji: Welcome to the Jungle; Adam Driver – Star Wars: The Last Jedi; Kevin Hart – Jumanji: Welcome to the Jungle; Joe Keery – Stranger Things; Mark Ruffalo – Avengers: Infinity War | |
