= The Tuxedo =

2002 film by Kevin Donovan

- Theatrical release poster
- Directed by: Kevin Donovan
- Screenplay by: Michael J. Wilson; Michael J. Leeson
- Story by: Phil Hay; Matt Manfredi; Michael J. Wilson
- Produced by: Adam Schroeder; John H. Williams
- Starring: Jackie Chan; Jennifer Love Hewitt
- Cinematography: Stephen F. Windon
- Edited by: Craig Herring
- Music by: Christophe Beck; John Debney
- Production company: Vanguard Films
- Distributed by: DreamWorks Pictures
- Release date: September 27, 2002
- Running time: 99 minutes
- Country: United States
- Language: English
- Budget: $60 million
- Box office: $104.4 million

The Tuxedo is a 2002 American science fiction action comedy film directed by Kevin Donovan and starring Jackie Chan and Jennifer Love Hewitt.

The spy parody involves a special tuxedo that grants its wearer superhuman abilities. The plot surrounds a corporate terrorist who threatens to poison the United States' fresh water supply with bacteria that spills electrolytes into the blood and totally dehydrates the host.

The film received negative reviews from critics upon release and earned a total worldwide box office gross of $104.4 million.

== Plot ==
James "Jimmy" Tong is a taxi driver notorious for his speed and ability to get his customers anywhere in the least amount of time, with no accidents whatsoever. His reputation lands him a job, given by CSA Agent Steena, as the personal chauffeur of the mysterious but wealthy Clark Devlin. Jimmy does not really know what his new boss' job is, but Devlin's friendly nature, imperturbable demeanor, and willingness to offer Jimmy advice wins him over and the two become friends.

What Jimmy does not realize is that Devlin is a secret spy and undercover government agent, for an agency called the CSA. When an attempt to kill Devlin with a car bombing sends him into a coma, Jimmy ends up with Devlin's recent case notes and a special watch that controls Devlin's rather unusual tuxedo.

The tuxedo is a gadget capable of granting its wearer special abilities (including martial arts, speed, the ability to dance, sing, cling to walls, and to perform various acrobatics) which Jimmy must use to stop the criminal organization responsible for Devlin's attempted murder. The group is a terrorist organization disguised as a corporation named Banning Corporation and is headed by the notorious and ruthless Dietrich Banning. Its goal is to take over the global drinking water supply, starting with the poisoning of major US reservoirs by means of genetically modified water strider insects.

These water striders carry bacteria capable of human-to-human transmission, resulting in severe dehydration. By chance, Jimmy is accompanied by Delilah "Del" Blaine, a brilliant scientist seeking field experience. Although initially enthusiastic about the assignment, she becomes confused by Jimmy's impersonation of Devlin. Jimmy relies on the tuxedo's special abilities to compensate for his lack of formal training.

At first, Blaine thinks Jimmy is weird and annoying and finds it almost impossible to understand what makes him a great agent. When Jimmy's impersonation is finally exposed, she confiscates his borrowed tuxedo and attempts to stop the evil Dietrich Banning on her own by feigning a desire to become a turncoat for Banning Corporation. Meanwhile, Jimmy is ready to give up and go back to his life as a taxi driver, but while packing his belongings, he discovers that Devlin had ordered a second suit for Jimmy himself, believing that Jimmy could also be a great agent.

Using his new suit, Jimmy defeats the villain, Banning, by putting a cigarette in Blaine's mouth. Banning's tuxedo automatically forces him to pull out a lighter and light her cigarette. In the confusion, Jimmy begins to punch Banning. During the fight, Jimmy throws a glass containing the queen of the water striders into Banning's mouth. He is then infected with bacteria from the water strider. The other remaining water striders attack Banning and he then dies instantaneously from terminal dehydration.

As compensation for his role in bringing down Banning, the organization uses its resources to orchestrate an operation so that Jimmy can finally meet his dream girl. However, confused by Blaine's, Steena's, and the now-recovered Devlin's conflicting instructions on how to act Jimmy succeeds only in alarming the girl into threatening to mace him, resulting in the operation being aborted.

Consoling Jimmy afterwards, Blaine admits feeling sad that no one had ever tried to do for her what he had just done. He tells her that she has to change her shrewish personality and be more accommodating if she ever wants to have a boyfriend. Feeling a tentative attraction for each other, they walk away to buy coffee together.

== Cast ==
- Jackie Chan as James "Jimmy" Tong / Clark Devlin
- Jennifer Love Hewitt as CSA Agent Delilah "Del" Blaine
- Jason Isaacs as CSA Agent Clark Devlin / Brad Dillford (Inspired by Ian Fleming's James Bond)
- Debi Mazar as CSA Agent Steena
- Ritchie Coster as Dietrich Banning
- Peter Stormare as Dr. Simms
- Mia Cottet as Cheryl
- Romany Malco as Mitch
- Daniel Kash as Rogers
- Jody Racicot as Kells
- Boyd Banks as Vic
- Christian Potenza as CSA Agent Joel
- Scott Wickware as CSA Agent Wallace
- Karen Glave as CSA Agent Randa
- Scott Yaphe as CSA Agent Gabe
- Jordan Madley as Holly
- James Brown as himself
- Colin Mochrie as gallery owner
- Noah Danby as bike messenger
- Kim Roberts as ER nurse

== Production ==
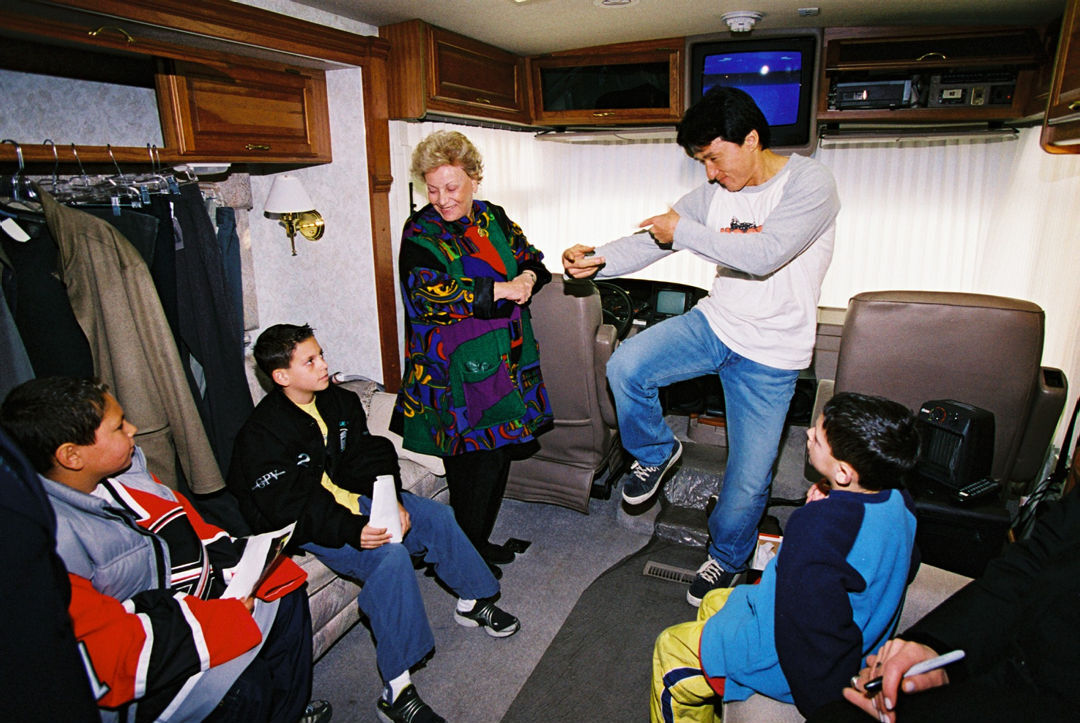
Chan in his trailer on set during production in Toronto, October 2001

Jackie Chan was unsure about the project adding special effects together with stunts, but was interested to work with DreamWorks for the chance to meet Steven Spielberg. Chan found the American approach to stunts and safety restrictive and wanted to repeat a jump but was not allowed. "American films are different -- it drives me crazy," said Chan. On her first day of stunts, Jennifer Love Hewitt suffered a broken finger after being struck by one of the stunt men.

Principal photography began in September 2001 and ended in January 2002. During filming in Toronto, Chan and Love Hewitt appeared on an on-set webcam and interacted with fans.

Chan worked on The Tuxedo in between shooting The Medallion, which started before, and completed shooting later.

== Soundtrack ==
After an initial score by Christophe Beck, John Debney was brought in to rescore the film (incorporating Beck's thematic material). Both composers ultimately had cues included in the final version.

The soundtrack album was released on October 1, 2002. It was handled by soundtrack label Varèse Sarabande, rather than DreamWorks' own in-house label DreamWorks Records, which primarily focused on rock and pop artists. It includes different cues written by the composers for the same scenes. Cues by Debney are in italics, cues by Beck in bold.

1. Jimmy's Tux (2:50)
2. Skateboard Chase (2:00)
3. Mad Bike Messenger (1:04)
4. Jimmy's Dream (:48)
5. **Main Title - "The Tuxedo" (3:01)**
6. **First Mission (2:54)**
7. **Swallow The Queen (2:25)**
8. **Demolition (1:20)**
9. Putting on Tux (1:59)
10. Demolition Program (1:02)
11. Rope Fight (2:58)
12. **Rope Fight (2:14)**
13. **Superhuman (1:39)**
14. **Walter Strider (1:21)**
15. **High Noon (:49)**
16. Banning Opens The Pods (2:29)
17. Banning Swallows Queen (:49)
18. Jimmy Saves Blaine (1:50)
19. Get Up (I Feel Like Being a Sex Machine) - James Brown (3:19)

== Reception ==
=== Box office ===
On a reported budget of $60 million, the film grossed $50.5 million in the United States. In its opening weekend, the film grossed $15 million from 3,022 theaters, ranking in second place behind Sweet Home Alabama. The film's total worldwide gross is $104.4 million.

=== Critical response ===
On Rotten Tomatoes, the film has an approval rating of 21% based on 137 reviews and an average rating of 4/10. The site's critical consensus reads, "Chan is as charming as ever, but his talents are squandered by special effects and bad writing." On Metacritic, the film has a score of 30 out of 100 based on reviews from 27 critics, indicating "generally unfavorable reviews". Audiences polled by CinemaScore gave the film an average grade of "B" on an A+ to F scale.

Roger Ebert of the Chicago Sun-Times commented that "The movie is silly beyond comprehension, and even if it weren't silly, it would still be beyond comprehension" but does comment that the film has its good moments. He gave the film one and a half stars out of four. Robert Koehler of Variety magazine says that the film's central problem is the mix of Chan's actual stunts and effects, which plays against Chan's whole career and hard-core commitment to doing all of his own body-defying stunts. He notes that Hewitt "has displayed a Chan-like sweetness herself in past roles" and is disappointed that her character is "a haggling, high-strung shrew who's instantly repellent" rather than an amusing sidekick as Chan has had in other Hollywood films. Koehler also criticizes the "pallid direction", and "virtually incomprehensible plot line". American film critic Wheeler Winston Dixon described the trademark action comedy as having an "unlikely pairing" of Jennifer Love Hewitt with Chan, and noted that Chan's doing his own stunts, even in his middle age, added a "welcome touch of verisimilitude to the endless succession of doubles who normally populate such films."

Writing in the Asian Journal of Communication in 2013, academic Zheng Zhu listed the film alongside Dragon: The Bruce Lee Story (1993) and Kiss of the Dragon (2001) as films that broke from the Western tradition of portraying Asian men as asexual, stating that while they are often featured as heroes in martial arts films, they are rarely portrayed as romantic or loving. Noting the films each show an Asian martial artist with a white female partner, Zhu states they reverse the conventional portrayal of a "dominant white knight and a submissive Oriental lady". However, he makes critiques of the portrayal of these relationships. For example, each film shows "white women play[ing] the most important role" in helping Chinese men accomplish success. Asian men, Zhu argues, are portrayed as incapable of achieving success in Western society unless they are supported by white femininity.

== Home media ==
The film was released on DVD and VHS by DreamWorks Home Entertainment on February 25, 2003. The film also received a VCD release in some Asian areas. The film was released on Blu-ray for the first time by Paramount Home Entertainment on May 25, 2021. Paramount Home Entertainment later reissued it on Blu-ray on July 23, 2024. The Blu-ray version retains special features which were originally from the 2003 DVD, including "The Cutting Room Floor" segments (deleted scenes), a "Tailor Made for Jackie Chan" featurette exploring the film's production and Chan's involvement, and trailers. The film has been made available on Paramount's subscription streaming service Paramount+, as well as on its free streaming service Pluto TV. In Australia, it was also on the streaming service for the Paramount-owned broadcaster Network 10.

== Novelization ==
A novelization of the film was released by publisher Price Stern Sloan adapted by Ellen Weiss.

== See also ==
- List of films featuring powered exoskeletons
