= Ride Along (film) =

2014 film by Tim Story

- Theatrical release poster
- Directed by: Tim Story
- Screenplay by: Greg Coolidge; Jason Mantzoukas; Phil Hay; Matt Manfredi
- Story by: Greg Coolidge
- Produced by: Will Packer; Matt Alvarez; Ice Cube; Larry Brezner
- Starring: Ice Cube; Kevin Hart; John Leguizamo; Bruce McGill; Tika Sumpter; Laurence Fishburne
- Cinematography: Larry Blanford
- Edited by: Craig Alpert
- Music by: Christopher Lennertz
- Production companies: Universal Pictures; Relativity Media; Cube Vision; Rainforest Films
- Distributed by: Universal Pictures
- Release date: January 17, 2014 (United States)
- Running time: 100 minutes
- Country: United States
- Language: English
- Budget: $25 million
- Box office: $154.5 million

Ride Along is a 2014 American buddy cop action comedy film directed by Tim Story and written by Greg Coolidge, Jason Mantzoukas, Phil Hay and Matt Manfredi, and starring Ice Cube, Kevin Hart, John Leguizamo, Bruce McGill, Tika Sumpter and Laurence Fishburne.

The film follows Ben Barber (Hart), a security guard who must prove to his girlfriend's police officer brother, James Payton (Cube), that he is worthy of marrying her. During their 24-hour patrol of Atlanta, Ben accidentally gets wrapped up in James' hunt for an arms dealer, Omar (Fishburne).

The film was produced by Relativity Media, Cube Vision Productions and Rainforest Films, and distributed by Universal Pictures. Following two premieres in Atlanta and Los Angeles, the film was released worldwide on January 17, 2014, and received mixed-to-negative reviews from critics, but grossed around $154.5 million against a budget of $25 million. A sequel, Ride Along 2, was released on January 15, 2016.

== Plot ==
Undercover detective James Payton is on a falsifying passports operation run by "Omar". After a shootout with the smugglers, his lieutenant tells him to drop the case, which he does not.

Ben Barber, a jumpy, short high school security guard who plays video games in his spare time, applies to the Atlanta City Police Academy. He asks James for his blessing to marry his sister, Angela. He insists Ben first go on a "ride along" to prove he is worthy of her. If successful, he will recommend him for the academy, and give his blessing.

Taking Ben to the station, James asks dispatch to give him all the 1-26s that are called in, which he has Ben take care of. Questioning the informant Runflat, James uncovers the connection between Serbia and "Omar" and hears a shipment will come in that evening. Leaving the park, James takes Ben to the local shooting range and finds out that Zastava M92's have been given to the store. When a 1-26 is called in, Ben and James go to the Sweet Auburn Curb Market, where drunken 'Crazy Cody' is being disorderly. Ben is unable to subdue him, so James arrests him.

Ben asks to be taken home before Angela's call. He tells her about his stressful day, and she tells him Crazy Cody is James' poker buddy, and that 1-26s are code for annoying situations for newbies as a joke. Seeing Cody laughing with James, Santiago and Miggs at the police station, the upset Ben refuses to go home. He instead takes a 1-26 for a disturbance at a strip club. There, two men get into a Mexican standoff with James and Ben. Believing it’s another joke call, Ben fools around. James subdues them, then they are tipped off about a gun deal with Omar's men. Ben confronts James about the 1-26s.

James receives a call from Santiago in the car, who says Runflat has turned himself in. Ben says Runflat's brother told him in the park Runflat had just got out of prison, news to James so, another clue. They talk to Runflat's other brother, J, to get the location of the gun deal. During the conversation, Ben accidentally shoots J, who reveals the deal's time and place.

Deciding to infiltrate the warehouse with Santiago and Miggs, James leaves Ben in the car. They betray him, turning out to be crooked cops working for Omar. James is then tied up, which Ben sees. Santiago mocks and criticizes James for being unsociable and egocentric. As the deal begins, Ben pretends to be Omar (as no one has ever seen the real Omar).

Successfully fooling them, Ben wreaks havoc at the deal. Just as he is about to leave with James, the real Omar appears. A shootout ensues, and many of Omar's men are killed. Ben shows his sharp reflexes and knowledge of battle (thanks to his gaming). James and Ben take the money from the deal and escape before the warehouse explodes. Unbeknownst to them, Santiago, Miggs and Omar escape.

Santiago and Miggs arrive at Angela's, tying her up. As she was playing one of Ben's interactive games, Ben's fellow gamers hear the confrontation through Ben's headset. At the hospital, being treated for a gunshot wound in the leg, Ben receives a call from a gamer, who tells James something's going on at the apartment. After seeing some cops arriving at the hospital, James and Ben sneak out to Angela's with Omar's money.

James injures Miggs, before fighting with Santiago. As Santiago is about to shoot him, Angela knocks him out. Ben gets knocked out by Omar in a fight, who then takes the bag of money and Angela, and leaves. James follows them, confronting Omar. Just as Omar is about to shoot him, Ben slides over a car and kicks him. James shoots Omar twice, injuring him. Police arrest Omar, Miggs, and Santiago, and James finally gives Ben his blessing.

In a mid-credits scene, Ben and Angela are engaged, and Ben is weeks away from graduating from the police academy. At a barbecue at James's, Ben blows up the barbecue, flying into the bushes and killing the neighbor's dog.

== Cast ==
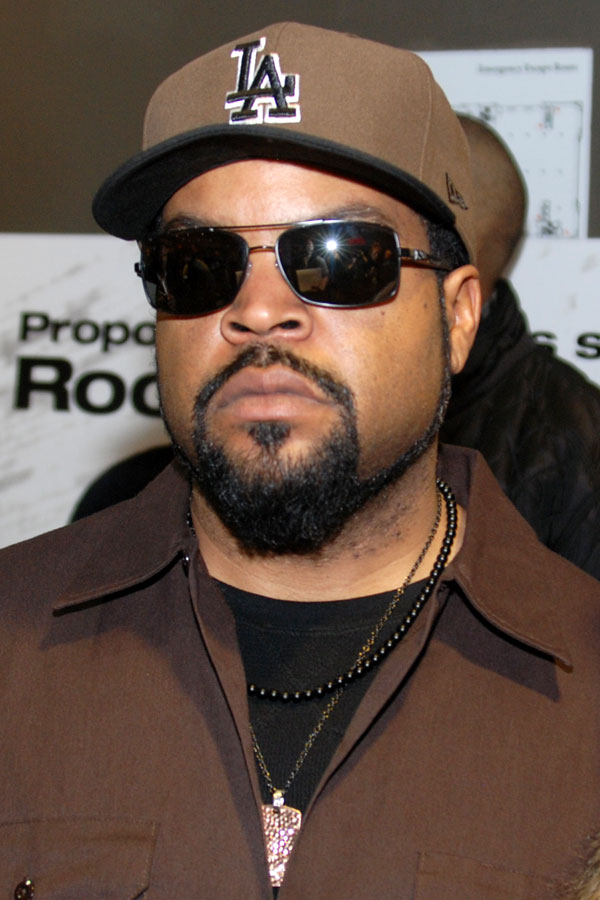
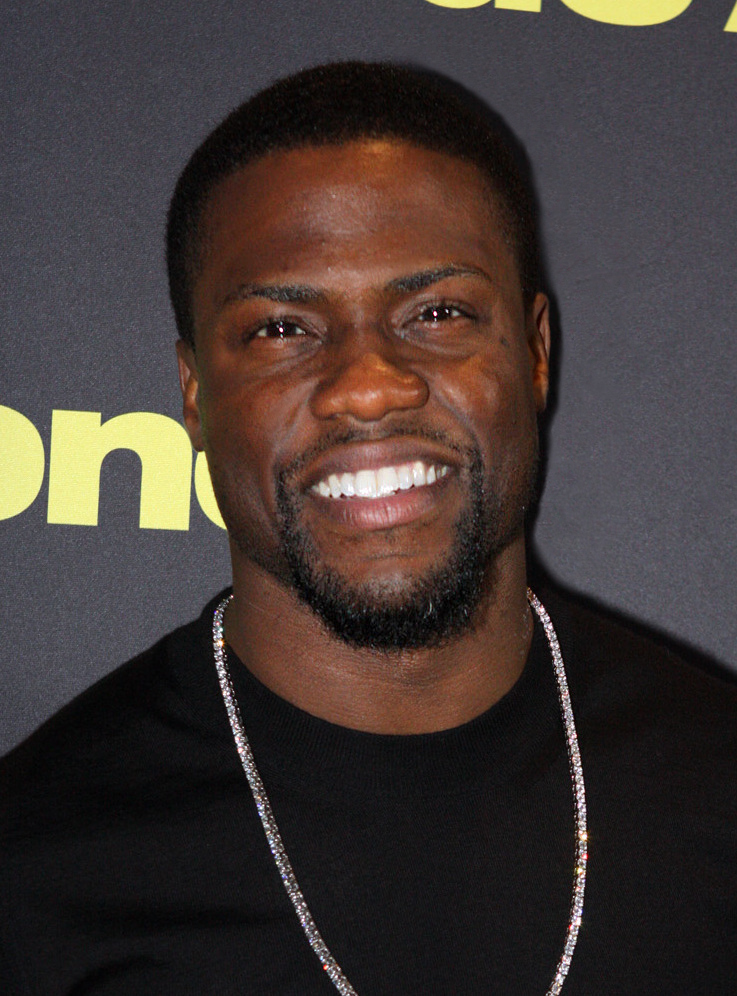
Ice Cube stars as James Payton and Kevin Hart stars as Ben Barber in the film.
- Ice Cube as James Payton, undercover police detective
- Kevin Hart as Ben Barber, James' sister's boyfriend
- Tika Sumpter as Angela Payton, James's sister and Ben's girlfriend
- John Leguizamo as Santiago, a detective and Miggs' partner
- Bryan Callen as Miggs, a detective and Santiago's partner
- Laurence Fishburne as Omar, a boss of smugglers
- Bruce McGill as Lieutenant Brooks, head of the Atlanta Police department

Additional cast includes Gary Owen as Crazy Cody, Jay Pharoah as Runflat, David Banner as Pawnshop Jay, Dragoș Bucur as Marko, Gary Weeks as Dr. Cowan, Jacob Latimore as Ramone and Benjamin Flores Jr. as Morris, Runflat's brother.

== Production ==
On November 29, 2009, The Hollywood Reporter announced that comedian Jason Mantzoukas had been hired to write cop-buddy comedy film Ride Along for New Line Cinema, originally written by Greg Coolidge, with Ice Cube set to star in and produce the film along with Matt Alvarez, through Cube's film company, Cube Vision Productions. The film was originally offered to Warner Bros., but according to Cube, the Warner executives reportedly passed down the offer because they told him that an action movie with two Black stars wouldn't sell well overseas; a studio executive claimed that the concerns about the stars were false and that the true reason for passing on Ride Along was because of script disagreements. On July 11, 2012, Universal Pictures acquired the distribution rights to the film from New Line, with production starting in October, Tim Story was set to direct the film, rewritten by Matt Manfredi and Phil Hay, and produced by Will Packer and Larry Brezner. On October 31, the studio announced the film would be released on January 17, 2014.

=== Casting ===
Ice Cube joined the cast on November 29, 2009, to play the lead role, Detective James; the story was then about a rogue cop who tries to break off his sister's engagement to an upper-crust white psychiatrist by inviting his future brother-in-law on a ride-along. Kevin Hart joined the cast on July 11, 2012, to play Ben, a high school security guard, with his character changed from white to black. On October 16, John Leguizamo joined the cast of the film to play an undercover cop. On October 30, Tika Sumpter, Bryan Callen, and Jay Pharoah joined the cast; Sumpter plays Angela, Ben's fiancée and James' sister, while Callen plays an undercover cop, and Pharaoh plays a street informant.

On November 9, Backstage posted that the film's director was looking for adult extras of all ethnicities for the background in the film. On November 16, Bruce McGill joined the cast of the film to play a hard-nosed lieutenant. On December 7, Gary Owen also joined the cast, followed by Laurence Fishburne.

=== Filming ===
Principal photography on the film began on October 31, 2012, in Atlanta, and crews were filming some scenes at Underground Atlanta on October 31 and November 1. On October 31, CBS Atlanta posted the news that Atlanta police are warning residents that there would be a simulated gun battle inside the mall area during the filming on Thursday, November 1. It was a 35-day shoot, which wrapped up filming on December 19 in Atlanta.

=== Music ===
On April 29, 2013, Christopher Lennertz was hired to score the film. Lennertz previously collaborated with Story on the 2012 comedy Think Like A Man. The soundtrack was released digitally on January 14, 2014, by Back Lot Music, while a CD version was released on January 28 by Varèse Sarabande.

Ride Along (Original Motion Picture Soundtrack)

Film score by Christopher Lennertz
- Released: January 28, 2014
- Recorded: 2014
- Genre: Score
- Length: 43:39
- Label: Back Lot Music

Christopher Lennertz film scores chronology
Thanks for Sharing (2013)	Ride Along (Original Motion Picture Soundtrack) (2014)	Think Like a Man Too (2014)

Professional ratings
Review scores
Source	Rating

All music is composed by Christopher Lennertz (Tracks 1–21)

Ride Along (Original Motion Picture Soundtrack)
No.	Title	Length
1.	"Ride Along"	0:32
2.	"Serbian Negotiations"	1:18
3.	"Car Chase"	2:08
4.	"Ben's First Ride Along"	0:55
5.	"Police Academy Acceptance"	0:46
6.	"Stranger Danger"	3:11
7.	"Ben's Goodbyes"	1:27
8.	"Crazy Cody"	2:51
9.	"Ben Overhears the Prank"	2:11
10.	"Strip Club Drama"	3:06
11.	"Interrogating Jay"	1:35
12.	"Drive to Warehouse"	0:51
13.	"Warehouse Pt. 1"	4:24
14.	"Warehouse Pt. 2"	4:05
15.	"Warehouse Pt. 3"	1:52
16.	"Ben to Hospital"	1:34
17.	"Shootout"	3:19
18.	"Omar at Angela's / James Was Wrong"	1:49
19.	"Angela Held Hostage"	1:47
20.	"Apartment Fight"	1:44
21.	"Omar Shot"	2:14
Total length:		43:39

== Promotion and release ==
A teaser trailer and an image were released on July 1, 2013. On September 26, the studio revealed the first teaser poster featuring Cube and Hart. On November 5, eight new images from the set and the poster were revealed. A second trailer of the film was revealed from studio on November 7. On December 19, Universal released a full-length trailer for the film.

On the night of January 6, 2014, the film's first premiere was held at Atlantic Station in Atlanta. On January 13, the Los Angeles premiere was held at TCL Chinese Theatre in Hollywood, California. Following the two premieres, the film was released worldwide on January 17, 2014.

=== Box office ===
The film's 3-day opening weekend gross was $41,516,170, at 2,663 US and Canadian theaters (an average of $15,590 per theater gross), giving Ride Along the then-record for highest domestic opening weekend gross in the month of January, ahead of 2008's Cloverfield. For the 4-day record-breaking MLK weekend, the film grossed $48,626,380. The film held the number one spot at the US box office for three weeks, grossing $21 million and $12 million in its second and third weekends. The North American domestic gross was $134,202,565, with the international gross being $19,059,619, bringing the worldwide total to $153,262,184.

=== Home media ===
Ride Along was released on DVD and Blu-ray on April 15, 2014. This release included an alternate ending, a gag reel, deleted scenes, a behind-the-scenes documentary and a feature commentary of the film by Story. In the United States, the film has grossed $13.5 million from DVD sales and $8.7 million from Blu-ray sales, making a total of $22.2 million.

== Reception ==
=== Critical response ===
Ride Along received mixed reviews from critics. On Rotten Tomatoes, the film has an approval rating of 18%, based on 134 reviews, with an average rating of 4.20/10. The site's consensus states: "Kevin Hart's livewire presence gives Ride Along a shot of necessary energy, but it isn't enough to rescue this would-be comedy from the buddy-cop doldrums." Metacritic assigns the film a score of 41 out of 100, based on 34 critics, indicating "mixed or average reviews". Audiences surveyed by CinemaScore gave the film a grade of "A" on an A+ to F scale.

British critic Mark Kermode gave the film one out of five stars, describing it as "an action-comedy short on both action and comedy."

Scott Foundas of Variety called the film "a lazy and listless buddy-cop action-comedy that fades from memory as quickly as its generic title." Entertainment Weekly′s film critic Chris Nashawaty gave the film a "C+" grade."

=== Accolades ===
The film received several award nominations, a 2014 BET Award for Best Actor for Kevin Hart, and two 2014 MTV Movie Awards nominations, Best On-Screen Duo for Ice Cube and Hart, and Best Comedic Performance for Hart. On April 13, 2014, after the best-screen-duo award went to Vin Diesel and Paul Walker for Fast & Furious 6, Ice Cube joked to USA Today that they were robbed.

Awards and nominations
Award	Category	Recipients	Result	Ref.
BET Awards	Best Actor	Kevin Hart	Nominated	
MTV Movie Awards	Best On-Screen Duo	Ice Cube and Kevin Hart	Nominated	
MTV Movie Awards	Best Comedic Performance	Kevin Hart	Nominated	
Teen Choice Awards	Choice Movie: Comedy	Ride Along	Nominated	
Teen Choice Awards	Choice Movie Actor: Comedy	Ice Cube	Nominated	
Teen Choice Awards	Choice Movie Actor: Comedy	Kevin Hart	Won	
Teen Choice Awards	Choice Movie: Chemistry	Ice Cube and Kevin Hart	Nominated	
Teen Choice Awards	Choice Movie: Hissy Fit	Kevin Hart	Nominated	

== Sequel ==
On April 23, 2013, the studio announced that there would be a sequel to the film. On February 18, 2014, it was announced that after the success of the first Ride Along film, Universal was moving forward with the sequel, which Tim Story would return to direct. Ice Cube and Kevin Hart reprised their roles, with Will Packer producing, and Phil Hay and Matt Manfredi on board again as screenwriters. Ride Along 2 started filming on July 7, 2014; filming locations included Miami, Florida and Atlanta, Georgia. Universal released the film on January 15, 2016.
