= The Invitation (2015 film) =

2015 American horror-thriller film

- Theatrical release poster
- Directed by: Karyn Kusama
- Written by: Phil Hay; Matt Manfredi
- Produced by: Phil Hay; Matt Manfredi; Martha Griffin; Nick Spicer
- Starring: Logan Marshall-Green; Tammy Blanchard; Michiel Huisman; Emayatzy Corinealdi; Lindsay Burdge; Michelle Krusiec; Mike Doyle; Jay Larson; John Carroll Lynch
- Cinematography: Bobby Shore
- Edited by: Plummy Tucker
- Music by: Theodore Shapiro
- Production companies: Gamechanger Films; Lege Artis; XYZ Films
- Distributed by: Drafthouse Films
- Release dates: March 13, 2015 (SXSW); April 8, 2016 (United States)
- Running time: 100 minutes
- Country: United States
- Language: English
- Budget: $1 million
- Box office: $354,835

The Invitation is a 2015 American psychological horror-thriller film directed by Karyn Kusama and written by Phil Hay and Matt Manfredi, starring Logan Marshall-Green, Tammy Blanchard, Michiel Huisman, and Emayatzy Corinealdi. It premiered March 13, 2015 at the SXSW film festival and began a limited release on April 8, 2016, and through video on demand, by Drafthouse Films.

== Plot ==
Will drives with his girlfriend Kira to the Hollywood Hills home of his ex-wife Eden, who is hosting a dinner party with her new husband David. After the accidental death of their young son Ty, Will and Eden divorced; Eden met David at a grief support group in Mexico. Their other dinner guests are Tommy, his boyfriend Miguel, and friends Ben, Claire, and Gina. Gina mentions that her boyfriend Choi is running late. Eden introduces Sadie, a girl she and David met in Mexico who is now staying with them.

Throughout the evening, Will wanders through his former home and relives memories, including Eden's attempted suicide. In the kitchen, Will witnesses Eden slap Ben when he makes a joke about her ideas on expelling pain. Eden and David's friend Pruitt arrives. David locks the front door, explaining that there was a home invasion in the neighborhood. Will goes outside for firewood and, through Eden's bedroom window, sees Eden hiding a pill bottle that he later learns contains the barbiturate phenobarbital.

David and Eden tell their guests about a cult-like group they joined, along with Pruitt and Sadie, called "The Invitation", which helps people work through their grief. David shows everyone a video in which the group's leader Dr. Joseph comforts a dying woman as she takes her last breaths. The guests then play a game of "I Want" in which Sadie kisses Gina, Eden kisses Ben, and Pruitt confesses to killing his wife and doing time in prison. David tries to convince an unsettled Claire not to leave, but Will challenges him. Claire leaves, accompanied by Pruitt, whose car is blocking Claire's. Will watches Pruitt follow Claire out of sight to talk to her, and David confronts Will about being too suspicious.

After dinner, Will peers through a cracked door and sees Sadie make odd faces into a mirror. She makes eye contact with him, follows him outside, and startles him with an indecent proposal, which he rejects. Will talks with Tommy about the weird, unsafe atmosphere he feels at the party, but Tommy reassures him that it is natural to feel strange about visiting the house and that Will is brave for showing up. He returns to the party while Will stays outside. Will finally gets a cell phone signal and finds a voice mail from Choi indicating that he was at Eden and David's doorstep before the other guests. Presuming that David and Eden must have done something to Choi, Will angrily confronts the couple about their strange behavior and links to the cult. Choi arrives unexpectedly, explaining that he was called away by work. Will is embarrassed, but the others assume his residual grief over Ty's death is causing him to behave irrationally.

David lights a red lantern in the garden. Will finds a laptop with a foreboding message from Dr. Joseph. David and Eden pour drinks for the guests to toast, but Will smashes the glasses, fearing they are poisoned. Sadie attacks Will, who inadvertently knocks her unconscious in the scuffle. Gina, who had sipped her drink before Will's intervention, collapses and dies. David, Pruitt, and a recovered Sadie attack the guests, killing Miguel, Choi, and Ben. Will, Kira, and Tommy flee and hide in the house. Will overhears David tell Eden that they have been chosen and that finishing what they started is the only way they can leave the Earth and be free of their pain.

Will takes a fireplace poker from Sadie whom he finds dying of her injuries. Pruitt finds and attacks Will and Kira, who beats him to death with a wine bottle. Eden shoots Will, wounding him, then remorsefully shoots herself in the stomach. David stalks the survivors with a knife, but Tommy disarms and stabs him to death. Eden apologizes to Will and asks him to take her outside. Will, Kira, and Tommy carry the dying Eden into the garden, where they hear sirens and screams and helicopters overhead. They see more than a dozen nearby homes with red lanterns and realize other cult members have carried out similar plans.

== Cast ==
- Logan Marshall-Green as Will
- Tammy Blanchard as Eden
- Michiel Huisman as David
- Emayatzy Corinealdi as Kira
- Lindsay Burdge as Sadie
- Jay Larson as Ben
- Michelle Krusiec as Gina
- Jordi Vilasuso as Miguel
- Mike Doyle as Tommy
- John Carroll Lynch as Pruitt
- Karl Yune as Choi
- Toby Huss as Dr. Joseph
- Marieh Delfino as Claire

== Production ==
In May 2012, it was announced that Luke Wilson, Zachary Quinto, Topher Grace and Johnny Galecki had initially been scheduled to star in the film, with Karyn Kusama directing from a screenplay written by Phill Hay and Matt Manfredi, and XYZ Films producing the film alongside Martha Griffin, Manfredi and Hay. In July 2014, it was revealed that production on the film had concluded, with Logan Marshall-Green, Michiel Huisman, Emayatzy Corinealdi, Lindsay Burdge, and John Carroll Lynch starring. The Invitation is the second feature to be financed by Gamechanger Films.

Kusama was influenced by the slow reveal of Let the Right One In and the unraveling family reunion in Festen. She cited the film's theme as "a metaphor for what the nightmare of anxiety really is, which is this irrational sense that people are trying to hurt you somehow".

== Release ==
The film premiered at South by Southwest on March 13, 2015. Shortly after, it was announced that Drafthouse Films had acquired distribution rights. The film went on to screen at the London Film Festival on October 9, 2015, and was released on April 8, 2016 in a limited release and through video on demand.

== Reception ==
On the review aggregator website Rotten Tomatoes, 90% of 116 critics' reviews are positive, with an average rating of 7.6/10. The website's consensus reads: "The Invitation makes brilliant use of its tension-rich premise to deliver a uniquely effective – and surprisingly clever – slow-building thriller." Metacritic, which uses a weighted average, assigned the film a score of 74 out of 100, based on 21 critics, indicating "generally favorable" reviews.

Justin Chang of Variety wrote that the "teasingly effective thriller represents director Karyn Kusama's strongest work in years." Heather Wixson of Daily Dead rated it 4.5/5 stars and characterized it as "some of the most assuredly confident and nuanced work from [Kusama] to date and one of the most devastating horror films I’ve seen in years." Dominick Suzanne-Mayer of Consequence of Sound rated it A− and described it as "supremely well-crafted," while Samuel Zimmerman of Shock Till You Drop said: "The Invitation is a startlingly adult thriller that, unlike Eden and her guests, is willing to stare down the weight our lives can bear." Drew Tinnin of Dread Central rated the film 4/5 stars and wrote: "The Invitation works so well because it taps into our general distrust of the world around us and how our survival instinct has been muted and ignored in order to maintain the appearance of being polite."

Josh Kupecki of The Austin Chronicle noted that while the film offered a few interesting ideas about grief and depression, it lacked innovation within the "dinner party from hell' subgenre." Peter Martin of Twitch Film remarked that, despite the sincerity and craft evident in the movie, it reaches a "limited, unsettling level" and halts at that point.
