= Karyn Kusama =

American filmmaker (born 1968)

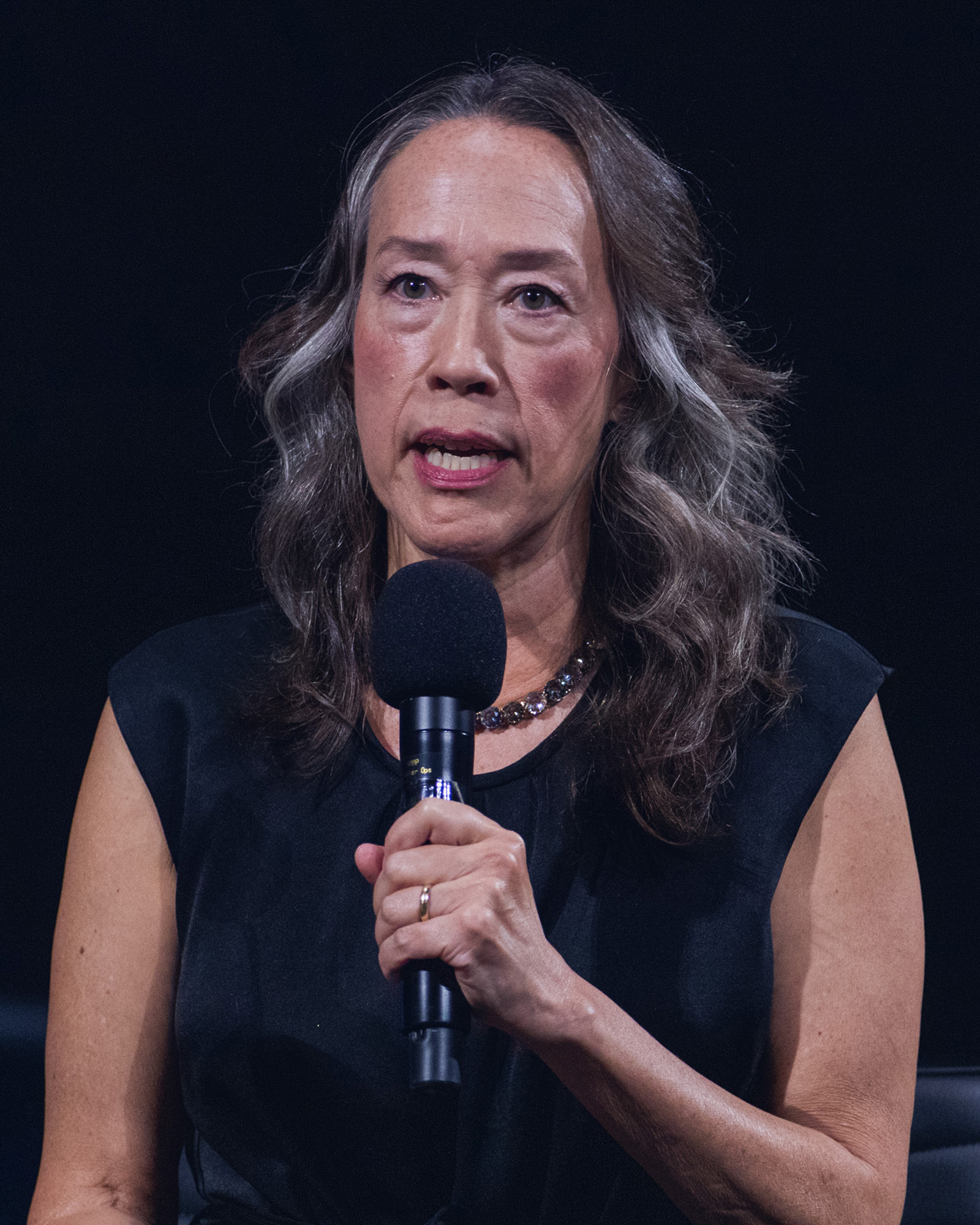
- Kusama in 2025
- Born: Karyn Kiyoko Kusama; March 21, 1968 (age 58); St. Louis, Missouri, U.S.
- Education: New York University
- Occupation: Filmmaker
- Years active: 1996–present
- Spouse: Phil Hay (m. 2006)
- Children: 1

Karyn Kiyoko Kusama (born March 21, 1968) is an American filmmaker. She made her feature directorial debut with the sports drama film Girlfight (2000), for which she won Best Director and the Grand Jury Prize at the Sundance Film Festival and was nominated for the Independent Spirit Award for Best First Feature.

Kusama went on to direct the science fiction action film Æon Flux (2005), based on the animated series of the same name created by Peter Chung, and the horror comedy film Jennifer's Body (2009). After working extensively in television, Kusama directed the horror film The Invitation (2015), a segment in the horror anthology film XX (2017), and the crime drama film Destroyer (2018). Kusama currently serves as a director and executive producer on the Showtime survival horror thriller series Yellowjackets (2021–present), for which she was nominated for two Primetime Emmy Awards. She also served as co-executive producer and director of the first two episodes of the third season of The Terror.

== Early life and education ==
Kusama was born in St. Louis, Missouri, the daughter of Haruo Kusama, a Japanese American child psychiatrist who immigrated from Japan and attended the medical school of Washington University. Kusama's mother, Susan McGuire, was an occupational therapist of Scots-Irish descent. She has a sister named Kristen and brother named Kevin, who passed from an heroin overdose. Karyn grew up highly invested in the film industry and watching movies, and used it as an outlet to help her feel seen. Her love for filmmaking grew from the female directors Martha Coolidge and Amy Heckerling, directors of Valley Girl and Fast Times at Ridgemont High. She graduated from Ladue Horton Watkins High School in the St. Louis suburb of Ladue. In 1990, she earned a Bachelor of Fine Arts in Film & Television from New York University's Tisch School of the Arts. One of her professors at NYU, Carol Dysinger, admired her work and loved the way she told her story through filmmaking. Her jobs before making it big in the film industry varied from nannying, house painting, editing, and working with the production of independent films/ music videos. In 1992, after partnering with John Sayles as an assistant, she joined Gleason's Gym in Dumbo, Brooklyn where she started boxing, from which she drew inspiration for her debut film Girlfight.

== Career ==
=== 1996–2009: Girlfight, Æon Flux, and Jennifer's Body ===
After graduating from NYU, where she won a Mobil Prize for a student film called Sleeping Beauties, Kusama worked as an editor on documentary films, in production on independent film and music videos, as a nanny, and painting houses. Through her nanny job she met filmmaker John Sayles and worked as his assistant for three years while he was making the film Lone Star, as well as the development of his films Men with Guns and Limbo. While working for Sayles, she continued to write screenplays. In 1992, Kusama started boxing at Gleason's Gym in Brooklyn, training with Hector Roca. She began collecting ideas for Girlfight, but didn't start writing it until two years later.

At age 31, Kusama wrote and directed her debut feature, Girlfight. It took several years to find financing for the film, reportedly due to her insistence that the main character be a Latina rather than allowing the film to become a vehicle for a well-known white actress. After financing fell through shortly before shooting began, Girlfight was partially financed by filmmaker John Sayles, for whom she worked as an assistant at the time and who served as a mentor. The film was released in 2000 and won the Director's Prize and shared the Grand Jury Prize at the Sundance Film Festival, as well as the Prix de la Jeunesse at the Cannes Film Festival. With a budget of around US$1 million was critically well received. However, it brought in only US$1,667,000, which was considered a poor return. Despite this, the film launched the career of Michelle Rodriguez, who had no previous acting roles prior to being cast in Girlfight.

In 2005, Kusama directed her second film, Æon Flux, a Paramount Pictures studio production that starred Charlize Theron and had a budget of US$62,000,000. The film had been ushered through production by Paramount studio chief Sherry Lansing but during production Lansing left, which resulted in the film being recut and reworked, with significant changes from Kusama's original vision. Following this experience, Kusama said she would never again work on a film in which she doesn't have control of the final cut. The film was largely panned by critics and grossed $52 million worldwide, putting Kusama's career in limbo for years afterwards.

In 2009, Kusama directed the horror film Jennifer's Body, which was written by Diablo Cody and starred Megan Fox and Amanda Seyfried in the lead roles. The film grossed approximately US$31,000,000 on a budget of around US$16,000,000. Despite its box office success, the film received mixed reviews from critics upon its release but has since become a cult classic. The film was critically reassessed over time as a "forgotten feminist classic". According to Cody, the film was marketed incorrectly by executives who focused their efforts on the young male audience. In regards to the reappraisals of the film, Kusama credited its "distinctly female perspective," stating she had intended to make a film where young women could see themselves represented. Kusama has since described working on both Æon Flux and Jennifer's Body as "learning experiences," wherein she learned how to navigate the Hollywood studio system.

=== 2010–present: The Invitation, XX, and Destroyer ===
In 2013, Kusama directed the short film Speechless. Starting in 2014, Kusama began working regularly in television as a director on several series, such as Halt and Catch Fire, The Man in the High Castle, Casual, Billions, and The Outsider. Kusama was slated to direct an adaptation of Breed, an adult horror novel by Scott Spencer under the pen name Chase Novak. The film was to be produced and written by Kusama's husband Phil Hay and his partner Matt Manfredi, but there have been no updates since the film's announcement.

In 2015, Kusama directed The Invitation, a horror film written by Hay and Manfredi, and starring Logan Marshall-Green. The film was funded by a film consortium called Gamechanger Films, who fund films directed by women. It premiered at the 2015 SXSW Festival, to great acclaim, and was released by Drafthouse Films. The film would win the International Critic's Award at the 2015 Neuchâtel International Fantastic Film Festival, and was also nominated for Best Picture. Other accolades won by the film included Best Film at the 2015 Sitges Film Festival and the Golden Octopus at the 2015 Strasbourg European Fantastic Film Festival.

Part of the film's inspiration were the experiences of loss that Kusama, Hay, and Manfredi had. Kusama's brother, Kevin, died when she was young, as did a close friend in New York. The film was shot in sequence, cost US$1 million and was filmed in 20 days in Los Angeles. Due to the low production cost and time of the film, Kusama noted that despite the challenges involved with making a film in this manner she had the creative control she lacked on her previous Hollywood films.

In 2017, Kusama wrote and directed a segment, titled "Her Only Living Son", in the all-female directed anthology horror film XX. In 2018, Kusama directed the crime drama film Destroyer, which starred Nicole Kidman and Tatiana Maslany. According to Kusama, Kidman had lobbied for the part after reading the script. The film made its debut at the Telluride Film Festival to positive reactions for Kusama's direction and Kidman's performance, but disappointed at the box office, grossing slightly over $5 million globally with a budget of over $10 million.

In 2020, a new Dracula film was announced as in development by Blumhouse Productions, featuring Kusama as director and Phil Hay and Matt Manfredi as writers. The film was to be set in modern times and follow the character Mina Harker; however, the film was canceled in April 2022, just three weeks before it was to start filming.

In October 2024, Kusama was announced as the director and executive producer for a potential limited series based upon R. F. Kuang's 2023 novel Yellowface that had been optioned by Lionsgate Television.

== Themes and style ==
Kusama's films have been noted for their strong feminist themes, and with the exception of The Invitation, all have featured female protagonists. They are often flawed, with the filmmaker citing an interest in ambiguity and difficulty in characters. Kusama has described herself as a "feminist unapologetically" and has criticized the barriers that women face in the film industry. In addition to themes of feminism, Kusama takes the time to investigate and understand the darker side of psychology for her characters. She highlights many of the negative emotions such as violence, loss, anxiety, and unrest. She ensures her work is in a realist direction and related to the viewers in an uncomfortable way. Kusama's works are represented in an externalizing direction where her character's emotions are channeled into physical actions.

Her interest in being a filmmaker comes from the "disparate elements" of art in storytelling from dialogue to music, and the opportunity that being a filmmaker allows in uniting these elements into a single vision. Kusama's films have often drawn upon and been influenced by her own experiences and connections. In her beginning years she was surrounded by people dying, drugs, violence, betrayal, and anger. She used all of these feelings to create tension and anxiety from the audience. Kusama also refuses to set aside roles for men, hence the feminism within her films.

Some of her films have been set in the city of Los Angeles. On the city's usage in The Invitation, Kusama said that despite the film being primarily set and shot in a single interior space it had to be set in Los Angeles due to the mythology and history of the city and the surrounding Southern California region. With Destroyer, she aimed to authentically depict parts of the city not often seen in popular culture, resulting in its location shooting going "off the beaten path." Many of Kusama's production designs are thought through in a more emotional way. She ensures that the lighting, color palette, and music are a direct reflection of her characters on screen. Since she has a dark overall theme for her films, many of her works have dim and darkened lights in terms of color and most of her tones are way below the audible ranges of her landscapes so in the final project they come off as vibratory in theater. Kusama has a love for the visual arts and detail. Her signature way of framing her shots help push along her themes of her stories. Ensuring she has a controlled aesthetic, she uses isolation techniques, dead spaces, and the camera to create personal feelings with her characters.

== Personal life ==
Kusama married screenwriter Phil Hay in October 2006. They have a son. Although they had known each other since meeting at Sundance when Girlfight premiered in 2000, it was not until they worked together on Æon Flux that they began dating.

Hay has co-written three of Kusama's films with his writing partner Matt Manfredi. Together the trio formed Familystyle Films, under which Destroyer was released.

Kusama has named Jonathan Glazer and Jacques Audiard as two current filmmakers who have influenced her. She also said Chantal Akerman's arthouse film Jeanne Dielman is one of her favorite female-directed films. Kusama was initially inspired to make films–particularly centered around women–by her viewings of Amy Heckerling's Fast Times at Ridgemont High (1982) as well as Martha Coolidge's Valley Girl (1983).

== Filmography ==
Film

Year	Title	Notes
2000	Girlfight	Also writer
2005	Æon Flux	
2009	Jennifer's Body	
2015	The Invitation	
2018	Destroyer	
TBA	Mouthwashing	

Short film

Year	Title	Director	Writer	Notes
1991	Sleeping Beauties	Yes	Yes	
2013	Speechless	Yes	No	
2017	Her Only Living Son	Yes	Yes	Segment of XX

Documentary appearances

Year	Title
2017	78/52
2018	Half the Picture
2022	Body Parts
2022	Lynch/Oz
2024	Chain Reactions
2025	Boorman and the Devil

Television

Year	Title	Episode(s)
2007	The L Word	"Little Boy Blue"
2014–2017	Halt and Catch Fire	"High Plains Hardware"
2014–2017	Halt and Catch Fire	"Working for the Clampdown"
2014–2017	Halt and Catch Fire	"The Threshold"
2014–2017	Halt and Catch Fire	"Ten of Swords"
2015	Chicago Fire	"Forgiving, Relentless, Unconditional"
2015–2016	The Man in the High Castle	"End of the World"
2015–2016	The Man in the High Castle	"Land O' Smiles"
2016	Casual	"Such Good Friends"
2016	Casual	"Big Green Egg"
2016	Masters of Sex	"Night and Day"
2016–2017	Billions	"Quality of Life"
2016–2017	Billions	"Golden Frog Time"
2020	The Outsider	"The One About The Yiddish Vampire"
2021	The Mysterious Benedict Society	"The Art of Conveyance and Round-Trippery"
2021	Yellowjackets	"Pilot" and "Storytelling" (also executive producer)
2023	The Consultant	"Hammer"
2023	Dead Ringers	"Five"
TBA	Life Is Strange	2 episodes (also executive producer)

== Awards and nominations ==
Year	Title	Awards
2000	Girlfight	Cannes Film Festival Award of the Youth for Foreign Film; FIPRESCI Prize – Special Mention; Gotham Open Palm Award; Sundance Directing Award in the Dramatic Category; Sundance Grand Jury Prize in the Dramatic Category; Seminci Silver Spike; Nominated – Black Reel Award for Best Director; Nominated – Caméra d'Or; Nominated – CICAE Award for Best Film; Nominated – Deauville Grand Special Prize; Nominated – Ghent Festival Grand Prize; Nominated – Independent Spirit Award for Best First Feature
2015	The Invitation	Octopus d'Or Jury Prize; Sitges Film Festival Award for Best Motion Picture; Nominated – Fright Meter Award for Best Director; Nominated – iHorror Award for Best Horror Director; Nominated – Narcisse Award for Best Feature Film
2017	XX	Neuchâtel International Critics Award
2018	Destroyer	Nominated – BFI London Official Competition; Nominated – EDA Female Focus Award for Best Woman Director; Nominated – Toronto Platform Prize
2022	Yellowjackets	Nominated – Primetime Emmy Award for Outstanding Directing for a Drama Series
