= Phil Hay (screenwriter) =

American screenwriter (born 1964)

- Born: July 31, 1964 (age 61)
- Occupation: Screenwriter
- Years active: 2001–present
- Spouse: Karyn Kusama (m. 2006)
- Children: 1

Phil Hay (born July 31, 1964) is an American screenwriter. His credits include Destroyer, The Invitation, Æon Flux, Clash of the Titans, R.I.P.D., and Ride Along.

== Biography ==
Hay was raised outside of Akron, Ohio. While in college at Brown University, he joined an improv comedy group, where he met his future writing partner Matt Manfredi.

Most of his film screenwriting work has been with Manfredi. Their technique for joint screenwriting is to each write separate scenes and trade them to each other for further rewrites. In 2002, Hay and Manfredi directed the film Bug, with Manfredi being credited as the sole screenwriter of the film.

Hay has been married to filmmaker Karyn Kusama since 2006. He co-wrote the screenplays for Æon Flux, The Invitation, and Destroyer, which were all directed by Kusama. They have one child together.

== Filmography ==
Year	Title	Credited as			Notes
Year	Title	Writer	Director	Producer	Notes
2001	Crazy/Beautiful	Yes	No	No	
2002	Bug	Yes	Yes	No	Co-directed
2002	The Tuxedo	Yes	No	No	Co-wrote story
2005	Æon Flux	Yes	No	No	Co-wrote screenplay
2008	The Dungeon Masters	No	No	Executive	
2010	Clash of the Titans	Yes	No	No	
2013	R.I.P.D.	Yes	No	No	Co-wrote story and screenplay
2014	Ride Along	Yes	No	No	
2015	The Invitation	Yes	No	Yes	
2016	Ride Along 2	Yes	No	No	
2018	Destroyer	Yes	No	Yes	
2021	The Mysterious Benedict Society	Yes	No	Executive	Co-created, co-wrote 2 episodes
