= Matt Manfredi =

American screenwriter

- Born: Matthew R Manfredi
- Education: Brown University; American Film Institute
- Occupation: Screenwriter
- Years active: 2001–present
- Spouses: Casey Greenfield (m. 2004; div. 2006); Abby Weintraub ()
- Children: 2
- Parent(s): Nancy and George Manfredi

Matt Manfredi is an American screenwriter.

== Early life and education ==
Manfredi is from Palos Verdes, California, the son of Nancy and George Manfredi. His mother is a human resource manager for the Torrance, California city government and his father was a private lawyer in Los Angeles. He graduated from Brown University and also has a master's degree in screenwriting from the American Film Institute in Los Angeles. While in college he joined an improv comedy group where he met his future writing partner Phil Hay. He is of Italian descent.

== Filmography ==
Year	Title	Credited as			Notes
Year	Title	Writer	Director	Producer	Notes
2001	Crazy/Beautiful	Yes	No	No	
2002	Bug	Yes	Yes	No	Co-directed
2002	The Tuxedo	Yes	No	No	Co-wrote story
2005	Æon Flux	Yes	No	No	Co-wrote screenplay
2008	The Dungeon Masters	No	No	Executive	
2010	Clash of the Titans	Yes	No	No	
2013	R.I.P.D.	Yes	No	No	Co-wrote story and screenplay
2014	Ride Along	Yes	No	No	
2015	The Invitation	Yes	No	Yes	
2016	Ride Along 2	Yes	No	No	
2018	Destroyer	Yes	No	Yes	
2021	The Mysterious Benedict Society	Yes	No	Executive	Co-created, co-wrote 2 episodes

All of his film screenwriting work has been with writing partner Phil Hay. Their technique for joint screenwriting is to each write separate scenes and then trade them to each other for further rewrites.

== Personal life ==
As a widower in 2004, he married his second wife Casey Greenfield, daughter of news correspondent and author Jeff Greenfield. They divorced less than a year later. He has since remarried and has one daughter and one son.
