= Red Hour Productions =

American film production company

- Type: Private
- Industry: Film; television; digital
- Founded: 1998; 28 years ago
- Founders: Ben Stiller; Stuart Cornfeld
- Headquarters: Los Angeles, California, United States
- Key people: Ben Stiller; Stuart Cornfeld
- Products: Zoolander; DodgeBall: A True Underdog Story; Starsky and Hutch; Blades of Glory; Tropic Thunder
- Owners: Ben Stiller (50%); Stuart Cornfeld (50%)
- Subsidiaries: Red Hour Television; Red Hour Digital
- Website: RedHourFilms.com

Red Hour Productions is an American film and television production company operated by actor Ben Stiller and formerly with the late producer Stuart Cornfeld. In the past, Red Hour has had first-look deals with New Line Cinema, DreamWorks Pictures, and 20th Century Fox. The name was derived from a 1967 Star Trek episode, "The Return of the Archons", which features a scheduled alien riot.

The company's logo is a jester.

== History ==
=== Film ===
The first film produced by Red Hour was the 2001 comedy film Zoolander, based on the male model character Stiller co-created with Drake Sather for the VH1 Fashion Awards. Stiller co-wrote the screenplay with John Hamburg and directed the film. Red Hour Films also produced DodgeBall: A True Underdog Story, starring Stiller and Vince Vaughn; Starsky and Hutch, starring Stiller and Owen Wilson; Blades of Glory, starring Will Ferrell and Jon Heder; and Tropic Thunder, starring Stiller, Jack Black, and Robert Downey Jr. Tropic Thunder earned an Academy Award nomination for Downey Jr. and Golden Globe Award nominations for both Downey Jr. and Tom Cruise. The film won "Best Comedy" at the Broadcast Critics Film Awards and the Hollywood Film Awards.

=== Television ===
In November 2011, Red Hour announced a new television division to be headed by veteran film and television executive Debbie Liebling, and signed an overall deal with ABC Studios. In its first development season, Red Hour Television sold two comedies to ABC, Please Knock and The Notorious Mollie Flowers.

=== Digital ===
In 2010, Red Hour Digital, a subsidiary of Red Hour Films, signed a two-year first look digital deal with Paramount Digital Entertainment. Under the new two-year deal, Red Hour planned to develop original digital media properties that can be launched on a variety of formats, including live action and animated webisodes, and social media games on both digital and mobile platforms.

== Filmography ==
=== Films ===
Year	Film	Director	Story by	Screenplay by	Producer(s)	Distributor	Co-production with	Budget	Worldwide gross
2001	Zoolander	Ben Stiller	Drake Sather; Ben Stiller	Drake Sather; Ben Stiller; John Hamburg	Scott Rudin; Ben Stiller; Stuart Cornfeld	Paramount Pictures	Village Roadshow Pictures; VH1 Films; NPV Entertainment; Scott Rudin Productions	$28 million	$60.8 million
2003	Duplex	Danny DeVito	Larry Doyle		Stuart Cornfeld; Ben Stiller; Jeremy Kramer; Nancy Juvonen; Drew Barrymore	Miramax Films	Flower Films	$40 million	$19.3 million
2004	Starsky & Hutch	Todd Phillips	Stevie Long; John O'Brien	John O'Brien; Todd Phillips; Scot Armstrong	William Blinn; Stuart Cornfeld; Akiva Goldsman; Tony Ludwig; Alan Riche	Warner Bros. Pictures	Dimension Films; AR-TL; Weed Road	$60 million	$170 million
2004	DodgeBall: A True Underdog Story	Rawson Marshall Thurber			Ben Stiller; Stuart Cornfeld	20th Century Fox		$20 million	$168.4 million
2006	Tenacious D in The Pick of Destiny	Liam Lynch	Jack Black; Kyle Gass; Liam Lynch		Jack Black; Kyle Gass; Stuart Cornfeld; Lauren Ashwell	New Line Cinema		$19–20 million	$13.9 million
2007	Blades of Glory	Will Speck; Josh Gordon	Busy Philipps; Craig Cox; Jeff Cox	Jeff Cox; Craig Cox; John Altschuler; Dave Krinsky	Ben Stiller; John Jacobs; Stuart Cornfeld	Paramount Pictures	DreamWorks Pictures; MTV Films; Smart Entertainment	$61 million	$145.7 million
2008	The Ruins	Carter Smith	Scott B. Smith		Stuart Cornfeld; Jeremy Kramer; Chris Bender	Paramount Pictures	DreamWorks Pictures; Spyglass Entertainment	$25 million	$22.9 million
2008	Tropic Thunder	Ben Stiller	Ben Stiller; Justin Theroux	Justin Theroux; Ben Stiller; Etan Cohen	Stuart Cornfeld; Ben Stiller; Eric McLeod	Paramount Pictures	DreamWorks Pictures	$90–92 million	$195.7 million
2011	Submarine	Richard Ayoade			Mary Burke; Mark Herbert; Andy Stebbing	Optimum Releasing (United Kingdom); The Weinstein Company (United States)	Warp Films; Film4 Productions; UK Film Council; Wales; Creative IP Fund; Film Agency for Wales; Protagonist Pictures	$1.5 million	$4.6 million
2011	30 Minutes or Less	Ruben Fleischer	Michael Diliberti; Matthew Sullivan	Michael Diliberti	Stuart Cornfeld; Ben Stiller; Jeremy Kramer	Sony Pictures Releasing	Columbia Pictures; Media Rights Capital	$28 million	$40.7 million
2011	The Big Year	David Frankel	Howard Franklin		Karen Rosenfelt; Stuart Cornfeld; Curtis Hanson	20th Century Fox	Deuce Three; Ingenious Media; Sunswept Entertainment; Dune Entertainment	$41 million	$7.4 million
2012	Vamps	Amy Heckerling			Lauren Versel; Molly Hassell; Stuart Cornfeld; Maria Teresa Arida; Adam Brightman	Anchor Bay Films	Lucky Monkey Pictures		$92,748
2013	The Secret Life of Walter Mitty	Ben Stiller	Steve Conrad		Samuel Goldwyn, Jr. John Goldwyn; Stuart Cornfeld; Ben Stiller	20th Century Fox; Samuel Goldwyn Films	New Line Cinema	$90 million	$188.3 million
2016	Zoolander 2	Ben Stiller	Justin Theroux; Ben Stiller; Nicholas Stoller; John Hamburg		Ben Stiller; Stuart Cornfeld; Scott Rudin; Clayton Townsend; Jeff Mann	Paramount Pictures	Scott Rudin Productions	$50–55 million	$56.7 million
2016	Why Him?	John Hamburg	Jonah Hill; John Hamburg; Ian Helfer	John Hamburg; Ian Helfer	Shawn Levy; Dan Levine; Ben Stiller; Jonah Hill	20th Century Fox	21 Laps Entertainment	$38–52 million	$118.1 million
2017	The Polka King	Maya Forbes	Maya Forbes; Wallace Wolodarsky		Jack Black; Stuart Cornfeld; Monica Levinson; Priyanka Mattoo; David Permut; Shivani Rawat; Wallace Wolodarsky	Netflix	Electric Dynamite; Permut Presentations; ShivHans Pictures		
2018	Alex Strangelove	Craig Johnson			Jared Goldman; Ben Stiller; Nicholas Weinstock	Netflix	Mighty Engine; STX Entertainment		
2018	The Package	Jake Szymanski	Kevin Burrows; Matt Mider		Ben Stiller; Nicky Weinstock; Blake Anderson; Adam Devine; Anders Holm; Kyle Newacheck; Ross Dinerstein	Netflix	Mail Order Company		
2019	Plus One	Jeff Chan; Andrew Rhymer			Deborah Liebling; Ross Putman; Jeremy Reitz; Jeff Chan; Andrew Rhymer; Greg Beauchamp	RLJE Films	Studio 71; Bindery Films		$44,112
2020	Friendsgiving	Nicol Paone			Malin Åkerman; Haroon Saleem; Ben Stiller; Nicholas Weinstock	Saban Films	Endeavor Content		
2026	Focker-in-Law	John Hamburg			Jane Rosenthal; Robert De Niro; Jay Roach; Ben Stiller; John Lesher; John Hamburg	Universal Pictures (United States); Paramount Pictures (International)	Tribeca Enterprises; Delirious Media; Particular Pictures		

=== Television ===
Year	Series
1999	Heat Vision and Jack
2007	The Station (TV movie)
2012	Nantucket Film Festival's Comedy Roundtable (TV movie)
2013–14	The Birthday Boys
2014–16	The Meltdown with Jonah and Kumail
2015	Big Time in Hollywood, FL
2015	Another Period
2015	Crash Test: With Rob Huebel and Paul Scheer (TV movie)
2016	Zoolander: Super Model (TV movie)
2018	Escape at Dannemora
2019–2022	In the Dark
2022–present	Severance
2023	High Desert
2026	Born to Bowl

=== Web series ===
Years	Series
2010–2011	Stiller and Meara
2012–2013	Burning Love
2014	Next Time on Lonny

=== Documentaries ===
Year	Film
2007	Untitled Christine Taylor Project
2007	The Making of "The Pick of Destiny"
2009	The Boys: The Sherman Brothers' Story
2015	Bridget Everett: Gynecological Wonder
2025	Stiller & Meara: Nothing Is Lost
