= The Dink =

2026 comedy film

- Promotional poster
- Directed by: Josh Greenbaum
- Written by: Sean Clements
- Produced by: Ben Stiller; John Lesher; Rob Paris; Mike Witherill; Jake Johnson
- Starring: Jake Johnson; Mary Steenburgen; Aaron Chen; Ben Stiller; Ed Harris
- Cinematography: Carl Herse
- Edited by: Greg Hayden
- Music by: Dara Taylor
- Production companies: Red Hour Films; Rivulet Films
- Distributed by: Apple Original Films (through Apple TV)
- Release date: July 24, 2026
- Running time: 103 minutes
- Country: United States
- Language: English

The Dink is an 2026 American sports comedy film about the sport of pickleball, directed by Josh Greenbaum, written by Sean Clements, and produced by Ben Stiller and Jake Johnson. The cast includes Johnson, Mary Steenburgen, Stiller, and Ed Harris, as well as former professional tennis stars Andy Roddick and John McEnroe. The Dink was released in the United States on July 24, 2026, on Apple TV.

== Plot ==
Dustin "The Hammer" Boyd is trained from a young age by his domineering father Chuck to be an expert tennis player. As a teenager, he breaks his wrist during a match with a young Andy Roddick and loses the opportunity to go pro. Decades later, Dustin works at Chuck's tennis club as an instructor alongside his devoted assistant PJ, still desperate for both professional success and his father's approval.

Chuck's club is dealing with encroaching demands from pickleball players to convert courts for their use, as they are dissatisfied with the poor condition of the single court he has allowed them. Chuck intends to invoke a club rule which would force the request to be settled by a tennis duel, with the winner of a tennis tournament becoming Chuck's representative in the match.

Dustin aggressively powers through opponents to win the tournament, but injures his wrist again while celebrating his victory. Much to Dustin's chagrin, his doctor recommends he play pickleball to aid in his recovery. He reluctantly joins a club, teaming up with an older woman named Candace who recently took up the sport to help her get over her divorce.

Dustin initially struggles to play pickleball as his powerful tennis swings are a detriment on the smaller court. He and Candace learn together, bonding in the process. One night, Dustin visits her house to watch The Graduate, and he begins falling for her.

The next day, Candace has an unpleasant run-in with her ex-husband Mitch at a country bar, but Dustin helps her embarrass him by pretending to be her boyfriend. Outside the bar, Dustin admits his romantic feelings, but Candace says she is not attracted to him. The two part on bad terms.

After Dustin's wrist heals, Chuck surprises him by announcing that he wants Dustin to represent tennis in the duel. Dustin is disappointed to learn that the decision was only made by necessity after Chuck's first choice died in a freak accident. Dustin admits to PJ that he intentionally broke his own wrist during his match with Roddick so that he would not have to suffer the shame of losing outright to the superior player. Feeling less ashamed, Dustin reunites with Candace, and the two admit their mutual loneliness and how much their friendship means to them.

On the day of the duel, Dustin announces that he will play representing the pickleballers. Having anticipated this, Chuck reveals that he has hired Roddick to represent tennis. After winning the right to decide where the match will be played in a coin toss, Dustin chooses the pickleball court.

During the match, Roddick quickly picks up the nuances of pickleball and takes an early lead. Dustin mounts a comeback by using the poor condition of the court to his advantage, and wins with a dink shot. In private, Chuck professes pride in his son for finally defeating Roddick.

Six months later, Dustin has become the club's President of Pickleball Operations. The club's members, including Chuck, enjoy playing in a pickleball tournament, which Dustin and Candace enter as a pair.

== Cast ==
- Jake Johnson as Dustin Boyd
- Mary Steenburgen as Candace
- Aaron Chen as PJ
- Ben Stiller as Dr. Stone
- Ed Harris as Chuck Boyd
- Chloe Fineman as Marisa
- Patton Oswalt as Skip
- Andy Roddick as himself
- John McEnroe as himself
- Cleo King as Gail
- Lynne Marie Stewart as Judy
- Don Lake as Gary
- Wayne Wilderson as Gene
- Lennon Parham as Kris
- Chris Parnell as Neil
- Martin Kove as Mitch
- Christine Taylor as Bea
- Fortune Feimster as Esther
- Steve Berg as George
- Cayden Romero as Blake

== Production ==
The Dink was directed by Josh Greenbaum, written by Sean Clements, and produced by Ben Stiller and John Lesher through Red Hour Films, and by Rob Paris and Mike Witherill through Rivulet Films. Jake Johnson has a starring role and is also a producer, and Stiller has a supporting role.

Principal photography and filming began on November 4, 2024, in Los Angeles with Carl Herse serving as the cinematographer. Filming wrapped on March 6, 2025.

=== Music ===
By August 2025, Dara Taylor had composed the score for the film.

== Release ==
In August 2025, Apple Original Films acquired worldwide distribution rights to the film. The film was released on Apple TV on July 24, 2026.

== Reception ==
The film received positive reviews from critics. On the review aggregator website Rotten Tomatoes, 76% of 91 critics' reviews are positive, with an average rating of 6.2/10. The website's consensus reads: "Jake Johnson gives his all to pickleball in The Dink, a funny and easygoing enough comeback for the sports comedies of yore that leaves it all on the court with ample pizzazz." Metacritic, which uses a weighted average, assigned the film a score of 57 out of 100, based on 22 critics, indicating "mixed or average" reviews.
