= Stuart Cornfeld =

American film producer (1952–2020)

- Born: November 13, 1952; Los Angeles, California, U.S.
- Died: June 26, 2020 (aged 67); Philadelphia, Pennsylvania, U.S.
- Education: University of California, Berkeley (BA); American Film Institute (MFA)
- Occupations: Film producer, actor

Stuart Cornfeld (November 13, 1952 – June 26, 2020) was an American film producer. He was business partners with Ben Stiller in the company Red Hour Productions.

== Early life and education ==
Cornfeld was born in Los Angeles, California. He attended the University of California, Berkeley in the early 1970s, and graduated with a degree in Psychology. He graduated from the AFI Conservatory in 1975.

== Career ==
During his time at AFI, one of his classmates was actress Anne Bancroft, who was preparing to make her first film as a director, Fatso. She hired Cornfeld as producer and also introduced him to her husband, Mel Brooks. Brooks also hired him to produce his films High Anxiety and History of the World, Part I. Fatso became Brooks's first dramatic film as a producer. Cornfeld later brought the projects The Elephant Man and The Fly to Brooks, along with their respective directors, David Lynch and David Cronenberg.

The appearance and personality of Les Grossman, the hotheaded and foul-mouthed Hollywood producer played by Tom Cruise in Stiller's film Tropic Thunder, is reportedly based in part on Cornfeld.

== Death ==
On June 26, 2020, Cornfeld died of cancer at age 67.

In 2025, filmmaker Joan Bofill Amargós's documentary The Hanging of Stuart Cornfeld, about Cornfeld's life and career, premiered at AFI Fest. It was later presented as part of the inaugural Tribeca Storytelling Summit in the special event The Art of Producing and received its international premiere at the Karlovy Vary International Film Festival.

== Filmography ==
- Fatso (1980)
- Fast Times At Ridgemont High (1982)
- The Fly (1986)
- Moving (1988)
- Kafka (1991)
- Zoolander (2001)
- Starsky & Hutch (2004)
- Dodgeball: A True Underdog Story (2004)
- Duplex (2004)
- Tenacious D in The Pick of Destiny (2006)
- Blades of Glory (2007)
- The Ruins (2008)
- Tropic Thunder (2008)
- 30 Minutes or Less (2011)
- The Big Year (2011)
- Vamps (2012)
- The Secret Life of Walter Mitty (2013)
- Zoolander 2 (2016)
- The Polka King (2018)

Executive producer

- The Boys: The Sherman Brothers' Story (2009)
- Megamind (2010)
- Submarine (2010)
- Zoolander: Super Model (2016)
