= Zoolander =

2001 film by Ben Stiller

- Theatrical release poster
- Directed by: Ben Stiller
- Screenplay by: Drake Sather; Ben Stiller; John Hamburg
- Story by: Drake Sather; Ben Stiller
- Based on: Characters by Drake Sather; Ben Stiller
- Produced by: Scott Rudin; Ben Stiller; Stuart Cornfeld
- Starring: Ben Stiller; Owen Wilson; Will Ferrell; Christine Taylor; Milla Jovovich; Jerry Stiller; Jon Voight
- Cinematography: Barry Peterson
- Edited by: Greg Hayden
- Music by: David Arnold
- Production companies: Village Roadshow Pictures; VH1 Films; NPV Entertainment; Red Hour Productions; Scott Rudin Productions
- Distributed by: Paramount Pictures
- Release date: September 28, 2001
- Running time: 89 minutes
- Country: United States
- Language: English
- Budget: $28 million
- Box office: $60.8 million

Zoolander is a 2001 American action comedy film directed, co-produced, co-written by and starring Ben Stiller. A satire on the fashion industry, the film follows fashion model Derek Zoolander (Stiller) who is tricked by fashion mogul Jacobim Mugatu (Will Ferrell) into assassinating the Prime Minister of Malaysia, whose progressive laws on the fashion industry would harm his businesses. The cast also features Owen Wilson, Christine Taylor, Milla Jovovich, Jerry Stiller and Jon Voight.

The film contains elements from a pair of short films directed by Russell Bates and written by Drake Sather and Ben Stiller for the VH1 Fashion Awards television specials in 1996 and 1997.

Zoolander was released to theatres by Paramount Pictures on September 28, 2001. It received generally positive reviews and was a box-office success, grossing $60.8 million against a $28 million budget. A sequel, Zoolander 2, was released in February 2016. An animated film follow-up, Zoolander: Super Model, was released on Netflix in the UK in August 2016.

== Plot ==
In New York City, award-winning male model Derek Zoolander is at a low point; he is ousted as the top male fashion model by rising star Hansel McDonald, and his roommates and colleagues Brint, Rufus, and Meekus are killed in a "freak gasoline-fight accident". He decides to retire from modeling and attempts to reconnect with his southern New Jersey working-class relatives, but the family rejects him. Meanwhile, fashion mogul Jacobim Mugatu and Derek's agent Maury Ballstein are charged by the fashion industry with finding a model who can be brainwashed into assassinating the new progressive-leaning Prime Minister of Malaysia, whose policies will prohibit them from retaining cheap child labor in the country. Upon seeing Derek's confusing behaviour at the awards ceremony, Mugatu hires Derek, whom he had never worked with, to star in the next runway show for his brainwashing plan. It involves Derek being conditioned to attempt the assassination when the song "Relax" by Frankie Goes to Hollywood is played. Zoolander agrees to work with Mugatu and soon faces off in a runway walk-off with Hansel only to be humiliated.

Journalist Matilda Jeffries, feeling responsible for Derek's downfall as she wrote a scathing Time article about him, becomes suspicious of Mugatu's offer. She informs Derek of her concerns, but he ignores her. After receiving info through calls from former hand model J.P. Prewett, who keeps his hand preserved in a glass container, Matilda and Derek meet him in a cemetery. Prewett reveals that the fashion industry has been behind several of history's political assassinations, including Abraham Lincoln and John F. Kennedy, and the brainwashed models are soon killed after they have completed their task. Prewett revealed that he was selected to assassinate Jimmy Carter, but was able to resist as hand models had different mindsets from regular models. Mugatu's cronies attack the group, forcing Derek and Matilda to flee. They go to Hansel's home, the last place they believe Mugatu will think to look. Derek, Hansel and Matilda bond, the two male models resolving their differences while partaking of Hansel's collection of narcotics and participating in an orgy with Matilda and others. Derek and Hansel break into Maury's office to find evidence of the assassination plot, but they cannot operate his computer to find them.

Matilda is given information on Mugatu, learning his birth name was Jacob Moogberg, a washed-up 1980s musician who switched to the fashion industry. Derek goes to the runway and Mugatu's DJ plays a remix version of "Relax". This activates Derek's mental programming, only for it to stop after Hansel breaks into the DJ booth and shuts off the turntable. After Hansel smashes the computer on the floor much to Matilda's dismay (since he took her saying the incriminating files were "in the computer" literally), a guilt-ridden Maury admits to the conspiracy. Mugatu then attempts to kill the Prime Minister himself by throwing a shuriken at him, but Derek stops it by unleashing his ultimate model look, "Magnum". In Derek's rural hometown, his father Larry watches the event on television and proudly acknowledges Derek as his son while Mugatu is arrested for his crimes and swears vengeance on Derek. A few years later, Derek, Hansel and Maury start "The Derek Zoolander Center for Kids Who Can't Read Good and Who Wanna Learn to Do Other Stuff Good Too". Derek and Matilda have a son named Derek Zoolander Jr.

== Cast ==
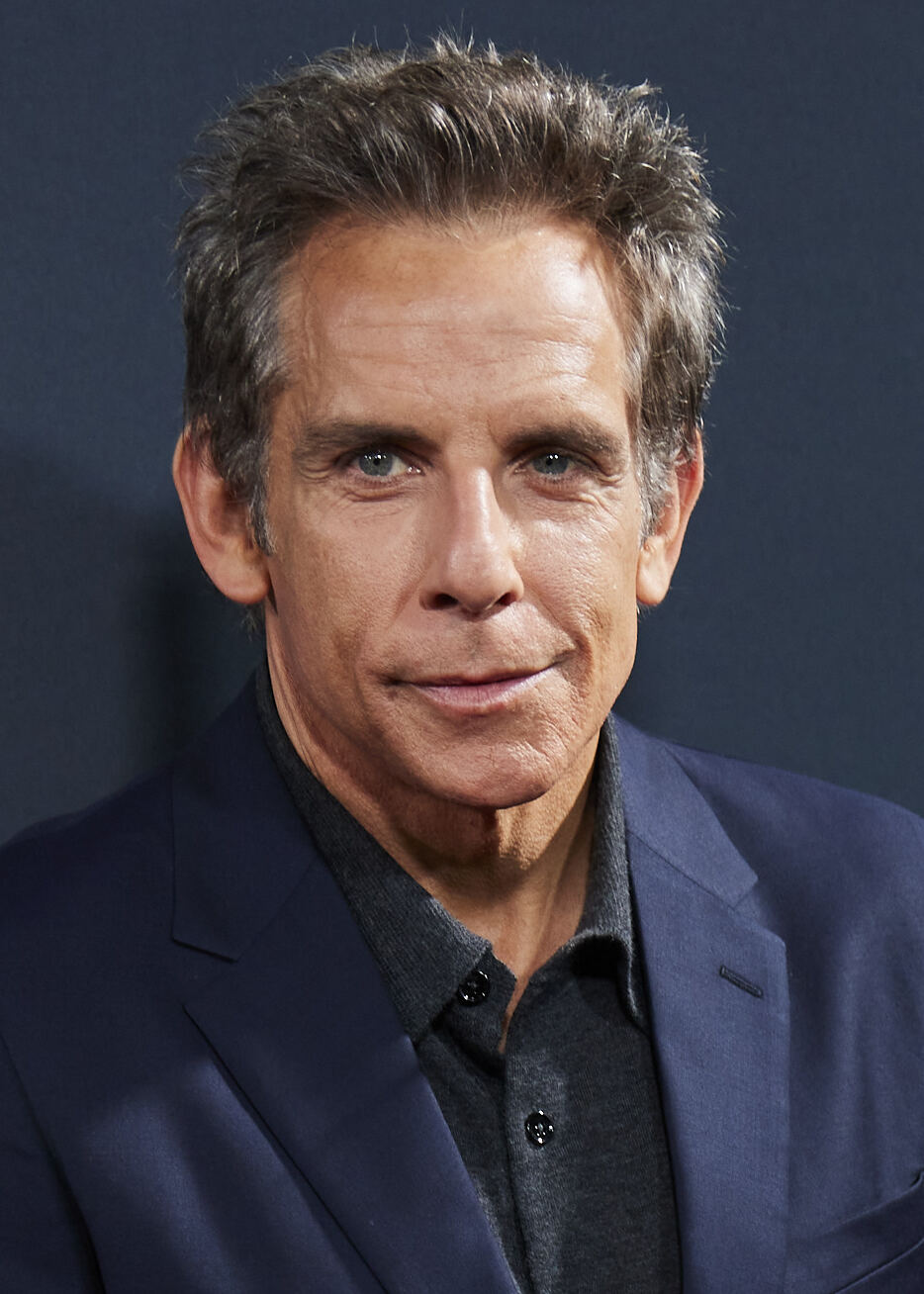
Ben Stiller

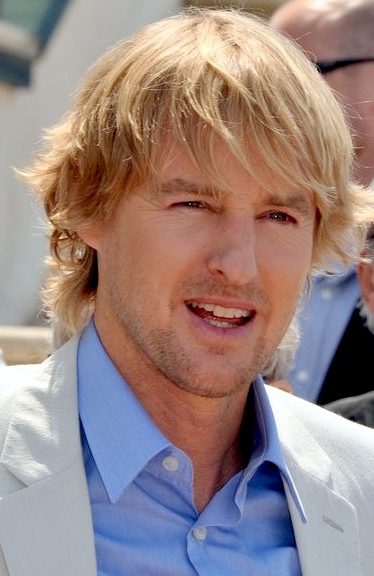
Owen Wilson

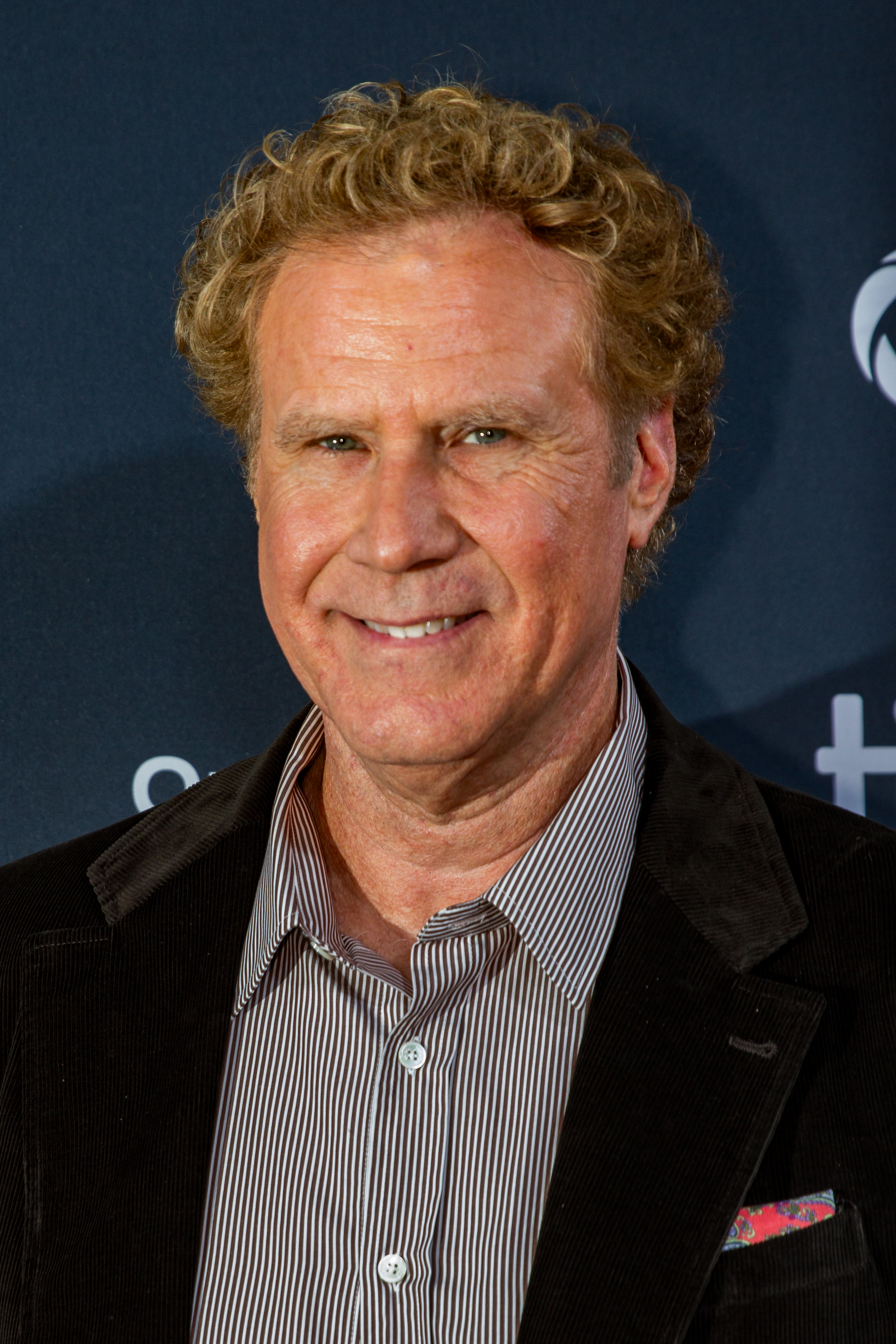
Will Ferrell

- Ben Stiller as Derek Zoolander
- Owen Wilson as Hansel McDonald
- Christine Taylor as Matilda Jeffries
- Will Ferrell as Jacobim Mugatu
- Milla Jovovich as Katinka Ingabogovinanana
- Jerry Stiller as Maury Ballstein
- David Duchovny as J.P. Prewett
- Jon Voight as Larry Zoolander, Derek's father
- Vince Vaughn as Luke Zoolander, Derek's brother
- Judah Friedlander as Scrappy Zoolander, Derek's brother
- Nathan Lee Graham as Todd, Mugatu's assistant
- Justin Theroux as the Evil DJ
- Woodrow Asai as Malaysian Prime Minister Hassan

Other actors in the film include Alexander Skarsgård (Meekus); Alexandre Manning (Brint); and Asio Highsmith (Rufus) as Derek's model roommates, Andy Dick as Olga the masseuse, Andrew Wilson (Owen Wilson's real-life brother) as Hansel's walk-off corner guy, John Vargas as the Italian designer, Jennifer Coolidge as the American designer, Tony Kanal as the French designer, Patton Oswalt as the monkey photographer, and Mason Webb as Derek Zoolander Jr.

David Bowie and Billy Zane made prominent cameos as themselves, with Bowie acting as judge for a "walk-off" and Zane appearing as a friend of Derek. Comedian Godfrey and Taj Crown appear as janitor disguises for Derek and Hansel, respectively. James Marsden appears as John Wilkes Booth. Also making cameos as themselves were Lance Bass, Tyson Beckford, Victoria Beckham, Emma Bunton, Stephen Dorff, Shavo Odadjian, Fred Durst, Tom Ford, Cuba Gooding Jr., Fabio Lanzoni, Theo Kogan, Lukas Haas, Tommy Hilfiger, Paris Hilton, Carmen Kass, Heidi Klum, Lenny Kravitz, Karl Lagerfeld, Lil' Kim, Anne Meara, Natalie Portman, Frankie Rayder, Mark Ronson, Gavin Rossdale, Winona Ryder, Garry Shandling, Christian Slater, Gwen Stefani, Donald Trump, Melania Trump, Donatella Versace, Sandra Bernhard, Amanda Lepore, Veronica Webb, Vikram Chatwal, Irina Pantaeva, Luther Creek, Christiane Amanpour, Malan Breton, and Danielle Stampe.

== Production ==
=== Development ===
Ben Stiller first created the character for a skit at the 1996 VH1 Fashion Awards. The name "Derek Zoolander" was invented by Bates while he was editing the first short film and was inspired by the names of two male models who both worked for Calvin Klein: Mark Vanderloo and Johnny Zander.

=== Casting ===
Owen Wilson was Stiller's first choice for the role of Hansel, but it was uncertain if he would be available and auditions were held. Jake Gyllenhaal auditioned for the role. Andy Dick was going to play Mugatu, but was unavailable due to a previous commitment to the TV show Go Fish. Stiller had originally intended to play Derek's agent Maury as well, but was already set to play the lead role and direct the film, leading him to cast his father Jerry Stiller as Maury instead.

David Bowie appeared as himself as the judge of the walk-off scene, filming his cameo in September 2000. He later stated, "It was just too funny a script to walk past. An absolute hoot!" With his entrance accompanied by a freeze-frame and a snippet of his song "Let's Dance" (1983), biographer Nicholas Pegg describes Bowie's appearance as "willingly sending up the media's image of him as the ultimate arbiter of cool."

=== Filming ===
The opening scenes were filmed at the real life 2000 VH1/Vogue Fashion Awards during commercial breaks.

"Derelicte" is the name given to the fashion line designed by Mugatu and is a parody of a real fashion line created by John Galliano in 2000, which used clothing worn by the destitute as its inspiration. The fictional fashion line in the film consists of clothing made from everyday objects that could be found on the streets of New York. It is described by Mugatu as "a fashion, a way of life inspired by the very homeless, the vagrants, the crack whores that make this wonderful city so unique."

The original ending to the film would have entailed Derek getting fatally struck by a train and ascending to heaven, but the idea was scrapped as the producers feared they could not fit it into the film's original budget.

=== Censorship ===
Zoolander was never shown in Malaysia, as the film depicts an attempted assassination of the Malaysian prime minister. Malaysia's censorship board deemed it "definitely unsuitable". The film was also banned in neighboring Singapore due to "controversial elements" according to the country's Board of Film Censors. It was subsequently made available in Singapore in 2006, with an NC-16 rating. In the United States, the film was originally rated R for its sexual content, profanity and drug references, but was later re-rated PG-13 on appeal.

In the Asian release, all references to the country of Malaysia were changed to Micronesia, the subregion which Hansel mistook for Malaysia at one point in the western version.

In the United States, since the film was released on September 28, 2001 (about two weeks after the September 11 attacks on the World Trade Center), Stiller made the executive decision to digitally remove the twin towers from any background shots that originally contained them. Stiller defended his decision to erase images of New York's World Trade Center Towers from the film, saying he did what he thought was appropriate at the time. The Twin Towers were later restored for the 2016 Blu-ray release.

=== Accusations of plagiarism ===
Glamorama, a 1998 satirical novel by Bret Easton Ellis, tells the story of a vacuous male model who becomes involved in a plot concocted by international terrorists recruiting operatives from within the fashion industry. In 2005, Ellis stated that he was aware of the similarities between Zoolander and Glamorama and said that he attempted to take legal action. Ellis was later asked about the similarities in a 2009 BBC interview but said that he is unable to discuss the topic due to an out-of-court settlement.

== Reception ==
=== Box office ===
Zoolander earned $15.5 million during its opening weekend, ranking in second place behind Don't Say a Word. It grossed $45.2 million in the U.S. and Canada and $15.6 million in other territories, for a worldwide total of $60.8 million against a budget of $28 million.

=== Critical response ===
On Rotten Tomatoes, the film has an approval rating of 64% based on 135 reviews, with an average rating of 5.9/10. The site's critical consensus reads, "A wacky satire on the fashion industry, Zoolander is one of those deliberately dumb comedies that can deliver genuine laughs." On Metacritic, the film has a weighted average score of 61 out of 100 based on reviews from 31 critics, indicating "generally favorable reviews". Audiences polled by CinemaScore gave the film an average grade of "C+" on an A+ to F scale.

Reviews appreciated Zoolander as an escapist, upbeat satire on New York fashion. BBC film critic Nev Pierce labeled it "sharply observed", specifically with its parody magazine covers and dialogue.

Kirk Honeycutt of The Hollywood Reporter felt the film mostly achieved the difficult goal of being "silly and smart" at the same time. Its humor, however, was generally considered hit-and-miss. Honeycutt wrote it had both predictable "low-grade gags" and "weirdly hip and even witty ones". Pierce thought "the frenetic buffoonery does score several big laughs" but could take time for some viewers to adapt to, such as in the first hour, "where several jokes fail to click and Ferrell's camp villainy simply grates".

Some reviews criticized the incorporation of child labor law themes; Roger Ebert criticized the portrayal as insensitive. McCarthy, while finding the assassin subplot clever, also found it too serious for the comical vibe.

Todd McCarthy of Variety praised the performances and highlighted its many cameos. He called Stiller's performance "constantly amusing" if overplaying his "look" a little, but stated "the character's intentional superficiality wears a little thin at feature length". The journalist exclaimed Wilson "gets far more comic mileage than one could have imagined possible overlaying ruthless careerism with an affably vacant grunge/Eastern veneer". Pierce wrote how the actors contributed to the film's style; he argued that Wilson's "impeccable timing in the climax elevates the sometimes bizarre material to moments that border comedy genius" and that the use of cameos "lends an air of authenticity to the idiocy".

Although praising the production design, costumes and choice of pop songs, Todd McCarthy felt the film did not have "truly confident visual stylization" to make comic book-esque villains like Mugatu enjoyable, and that long conversations were not fluidly written and edited. He also went after the removal of the Twin Towers as "disruptive" and offending the audience's intelligence.

Roger Ebert added that "to some degree, Zoolander is a victim of bad timing", referencing the film's release two weeks after September 11, 2001 and the prime-ministerial assassination plot point which he found to be in bad taste. He found some parts of the film funny and gave it a rating of one star out of four. According to Stiller, years later in private, Ebert admitted that he had changed his mind and now thought that the film was funny and apologized to him for going "overboard".

The film received votes from two critics at the Sight & Sound's poll of the greatest films of all time in 2012.

== Analysis ==
Fashion journalist Hadley Freeman categorized Zoolander as unique among other mainstream fashion films such as Designing Woman (1957), Funny Face (1957) and The Devil Wears Prada (2006); whereas these films usually employ the same critiques of unintelligent models, silly clothing and insipid business practices, Zoolander is much more surreal in how it puts these cliches together, as shown in its premise of male models being hypnotized to kill a prime minister.

== Soundtrack ==
The soundtrack to Zoolander was released on September 25, 2001.

No.	Title	Writer(s)	Producer(s)	Length
1.	"Start the Commotion" (performed by The Wiseguys featuring Greg Nice)	Theo Keating; Salaam Remi; Greg Nice; Bob Bogle; Mel Tyler; Don Wilson; Nokie Edwards	Touché	2:35
2.	"Relax" (performed by Frankie Goes to Hollywood)	Peter Gill; William Johnson; Mark O'Toole	Trevor Horn	3:57
3.	"Call Me" (performed by Nikka Costa)	Deborah Harry; Giorgio Moroder	Justin Stanley; Mark Ronson	4:08
4.	"Love to Love You Baby" (performed by No Doubt)	Giorgio Moroder; Pete Bellotte; Donna Summer	Alain Johannes; Natasha Shneider; No Doubt	4:22
5.	"I Started a Joke" (performed by The Wallflowers)	Barry Gibb; Robin Gibb; Maurice Gibb	Julian Raymond	3:09
6.	"He Ain't Heavy, He's My Brother" (performed by Rufus Wainwright)	Bob Russell; Bobby Scott	George Drakoulias; Matt Hyde; Rufus Wainwright	4:38
7.	"Wake Me Up Before You Go-Go" (performed by Wham!)	George Michael	George Michael	3:51
8.	"Rockit" (performed by Herbie Hancock)	Herbie Hancock; Michael Beinhorn; Bill Laswell	Herbie Hancock; Material	5:26
9.	"Beat It (Moby's Sub Mix)" (performed by Michael Jackson)	Michael Jackson		6:13
10.	"Madskillz-Mic Chekka (Remix)" (performed by BT)	BT	BT; Dave Audé (add.)	5:50
11.	"Faces" (performed by Orgy)	Jay Gordon; Amir Derakh; Ryan Shuck; Bobby Hewitt; Paige Haley	Orgy	4:28
12.	"Ruffneck" (performed by Freestylers featuring Navigator)	Aston Harvey; Matt Cantor; Raymond Crawford	Freestylers	5:43
13.	"Now Is the Time" (performed by The Crystal Method)	Ken Jordan; Scott Kirkland	The Crystal Method	5:37
14.	"Relax" (performed by Powerman 5000)	Peter Gill; William Johnson; Mark O'Toole	Josh Abraham	3:06
Total length:				63:01

Notes

- "Start the Commotion" contains samples from "Wild Child" by The Ventures and "Set It Off" by Greg Nice.
- The Kruder & Dorfmeister remix of David Holmes' song "Gone" is in the movie when Zoolander is at the day spa, shortly before his brainwashing.

== Sequel ==
In December 2008, Stiller confirmed that he intended to make a sequel to Zoolander, and by January 2011, a script had been completed. Filming commenced at Cinecittà studios in Rome in early 2015, and on March 10, Stiller and Wilson appeared at the Paris Fashion Week in character as Derek Zoolander and Hansel McDonald. Zoolander 2 was released on February 12, 2016. Unlike its predecessor, it received generally negative reviews.

An animated film, Zoolander: Super Model, was released on Netflix UK in August 2016.

== Legacy ==
In late 2022, the film went viral on the short-form video hosting service, TikTok. The trend used clips of scenes featuring Stiller and Wilson, creating a renewed interest in the movie.
