= Zoolander: Super Model =

American animated comedy film

- Directed by: Aaron Augenblick
- Written by: John Aboud; Michael Colton
- Based on: Zoolander by: Ben Stiller; Drake Sather
- Produced by: Ben Stiller; Justin Theroux
- Starring: Ben Stiller; Owen Wilson; Tim Gunn; Nick Kroll
- Production companies: Augenblick Studios; Insurge Pictures; Red Hour Productions
- Distributed by: CBS All Access
- Release dates: August 1, 2016 (United Kingdom); May 26, 2020 (United States)
- Running time: 84 minutes
- Country: United States
- Language: English

Zoolander: Super Model is an American adult animated superhero comedy film directed by Aaron Augenblick and starring Ben Stiller, Owen Wilson, Tim Gunn and Nick Kroll. Based on the Zoolander characters created by Ben Stiller and Drake Sather, it was written by John Aboud and Michael Colton. The work was produced in 2011 as a series of short episodes with the intent of releasing it as a web television series, but the episodes were eventually packaged together as a film instead, and was released on Netflix in 2016 in the United Kingdom and Republic of Ireland. In May 2020, it was released worldwide on CBS All Access. This was Jerry Stiller's final voice acting role before his death on May 11, 2020.

It is a parody of 1980s Saturday morning cartoons, depicting Derek Zoolander and Hansel McDonald as superheroes. Ben Stiller, who oversaw the work's production, gave the writers notes asking them to tone down some of the jokes to keep it similar to the PG-13 content of the original film, so while it would still be geared towards adults, it would not be so adult that younger viewers could not watch it.

== Voice cast ==
- Ben Stiller as Derek Zoolander
- Owen Wilson as Hansel McDonald
- Christine Taylor as Matilda Jeffries
- Jerry Stiller as Maury Ballstein
- Tim Gunn as himself
- Jenny Slate as Nani
- Nick Kroll as Frankie J-PEG
- Andrew Daly as Nani's Dad
- Jon Daly as The Paparocto
- Patton Oswalt as Dr. Botoxo
- Rashida Jones as D'Jangelo
- Heidi Klum as herself
- Leighton Meester as herself
- Katy Perry as herself
- Kim Kardashian as herself
- Khloé Kardashian as herself
- Julie Klausner
- James Adomian

== Reception ==
Yahoo! Movies' Ryan Leston wrote "Zoolander: Super Model has made it to Netflix as one streamable file with a runtime of 84 minutes… but it doesn't feel like one single story. Instead, it feels more like a miniseries that has been edited together and dumped online to cut its losses. Probably in the hope that no one would be stupid enough to watch it."
