= Zoolander 2 =

- Theatrical release poster
- Directed by: Ben Stiller
- Written by: Justin Theroux; Ben Stiller; Nicholas Stoller; John Hamburg
- Based on: Zoolander by Drake Sather; Ben Stiller
- Produced by: Ben Stiller; Stuart Cornfeld; Scott Rudin; Clayton Townsend; Jeff Mann
- Starring: Ben Stiller; Owen Wilson; Will Ferrell; Penélope Cruz; Kristen Wiig; Fred Armisen
- Cinematography: Dan Mindel
- Edited by: Greg Hayden
- Music by: Theodore Shapiro
- Production companies: Red Hour Productions; Scott Rudin Productions
- Distributed by: Paramount Pictures
- Release dates: February 4, 2016 (London); February 12, 2016 (United States)
- Running time: 102 minutes
- Country: United States
- Language: English
- Budget: $50–55 million
- Box office: $56.7 million

Zoolander 2 (promoted as Zoolander No. 2) is a 2016 American action comedy film co-produced and directed by Ben Stiller who wrote the script alongside Justin Theroux, John Hamburg, and Nicholas Stoller. The sequel to the 2001 film Zoolander, most of the principal cast members from the previous film reprise their roles such as Stiller, Owen Wilson, Will Ferrell, Christine Taylor, Milla Jovovich, Nathan Lee Graham, Theroux, Billy Zane, Tommy Hilfiger, and Jerry Stiller (in his final live-action film role), while Alexander Skarsgård and Andy Dick also returned in different roles. New cast members include Penélope Cruz, Kristen Wiig and Fred Armisen.

Filming took place from April to July 2015, in Rome, Italy. The film was released on February 12, 2016, by Paramount Pictures, to mostly negative reviews from critics and was a box-office flop, earning $56.7 million against a $50–55 million budget. It was dedicated to the memory of Drake Sather, the co-creator of the character Derek Zoolander and a writer on the first film, who died by suicide in March 2004.

== Plot ==
Agent Valentina Valencia of Interpol's fashion division, a former swimsuit model, examines the expressions of recently-assassinated pop singers' last images, believing they match Derek Zoolander's signature look, "Blue Steel". A flashback via news reports reveals that the Derek Zoolander Center for Kids Who Can't Read Good and Who Wanna Learn to Do Other Stuff Good Too collapsed two days after opening, killing Derek's wife Matilda Jeffries and injuring his former-rival-turned-best-friend Hansel McDonald, while his arch-nemesis and former mentor Jacobim Mugatu received two consecutive life sentences for attempting to assassinate the Malaysian Prime Minister, with co-conspirator and Derek's agent Maury Ballstein turning states evidence and disappearing into the Witness Protection Program. Derek later lost custody of his and Matilda's son, Derek Zoolander Jr., retired from modeling and subsequently became reclusive.

Billy Zane visits Derek in "extreme northern" New Jersey, invites him to the House of Atoz fashion show by "Queen of Haute Couture" Alexanya Atoz, and persuades him to resume a regular lifestyle in order to regain custody of his son. In the "uncharted Malibu territories", Hansel is informed by his orgy that they are all pregnant by him; Zane later arrives and invites him to the fashion show. After reconciling at the event following an acrimonious reunion, Derek and Hansel surprisingly discover that the ever-changing fashion world is now dominated by the likes of hipster fashion mogul Don Atari and the non-binary All. Forced onto the runway in "Old" and "Lame" outfits, they are doused by a large bucket of prunes. Afterwards, Alexanya sarcastically congratulates them.

Valentina tracks down the duo and instructs them to help Interpol uncover the assassin. Through her, Derek discovers his son is residing at a local orphanage. When they meet, Derek is distraught by his son's obesity. After Matilda's ghost asks him to protect their son, Hansel convinces Derek to accept Derek Jr. After meeting the Headmaster, Derek guides his son around Rome. However, Derek Jr. becomes disgruntled with his father and returns to the orphanage.

Hansel is anonymously contacted and ordered to travel to St. Peter's Basilica at midnight. He, Derek, and Valentina meet with Sting, who recounts the tale of Adam and Eve and the little-known Steve, a secret many popstars have died to protect. Sting reveals that Steve, the common ancestor of all models, and Derek Jr., his closest descendant, hold the bloodline of the Fountain of Youth. Derek returns to the orphanage to find it in disrepair, discovering that Derek Jr. and the Headmaster, revealed as the Evil DJ, have disappeared.

Derek encounters Mugatu at the Fashion Prison and attempts to interrogate him, but Mugatu tricks him, traps him, and escapes. Infiltrating the House of Atoz, Hansel witnesses Mugatu reuniting with Alexanya and killing Don Atari, and also discovers Derek Jr. has been imprisoned. At the IncrediBALL, he, Derek, and Valentina enter a bathhouse, discovering Derek Jr. strapped to a sacrificial table. Mugatu and numerous fashion designers prepare to cut out Derek Jr.'s heart and consume his blood, believing it to grant them eternal youth. Derek, Hansel, and Valentina successfully interrupt Mugatu, who reveals that he actually gathered the designers together to kill them and avenge his imprisonment.

Revealing herself as Mugatu's disguised henchwoman Katinka Ingabogovinananananana, Alexanya attacks Valentina, while Mugatu reveals to Derek that he sabotaged the latter's Center by having the construction crew build the base with faulty materials. Mugatu then throws an explosive towards the lava, which Derek halts with his "Magnum" look but struggles to keep suspended in mid-air. After Sting arrives to reveal himself as Hansel's father, he, Derek, Hansel, and Derek Jr. successfully use the "El Niño" look to hurl the explosive towards Mugatu, presumably killing him in the process. As Mugatu is placed in an ambulance and rushed to the hospital by paramedics, Derek Jr. forgives his father for his mother's death and Derek and Valentina confess their love for each other, with Matilda's ghost arriving to give them her blessing.

Six weeks later, Derek and Hansel have resumed modeling. Hansel resumes living with his orgy and has now fathered 10 children. Derek and Valentina have a daughter named Darlene V. Zoolander, while Derek Jr. becomes the next hot plus-size model and is now in a relationship with Malala Yousafzai. During the film's end credits, Derek and Hansel celebrate their victory by hosting a dance party, attended by their families and a fully-redeemed Mugatu, who apparently survived the explosion, which rewired his brain to make him reconcile with the duo in a newly formed alliance of peace and fashion.

== Cast ==
- Ben Stiller as Derek Zoolander, a male fashion model who is not very bright.
- Owen Wilson as Hansel McDonald, a fashion model who is Derek's best friend and former rival.
- Will Ferrell as Jacob "Jacobim Mugatu" Moogberg, a former fashion mogul and architect who seeks revenge on Derek for his defeat in the first film.
- Penélope Cruz as Valentina Valencia, an Interpol agent (and former swimsuit model) who becomes Derek's love interest later new second wife.
- Kristen Wiig as Alexanya Atoz, the Queen of Haute Couture.
- Fred Armisen as Vip, an 11-year-old assistant to Don Atari who is "Armisen’s face CGI-ed on a tween’s body".
- Kyle Mooney as Don Atari, a hipster fashion mogul.
- Milla Jovovich as Katinka Ingabogovinananananana, Mugatu's henchwoman.
- Christine Taylor as ghost of Matilda Jeffries-Zoolander, Derek's late wife.
- Justin Theroux as Evil DJ, one of Mugatu's henchmen.
- Nathan Lee Graham as Todd, Mugatu's second in-command.
- Cyrus Arnold as Derek Zoolander Jr., Derek & Matilda's son and Valentina's stepson. Arnold replaces Mason Webb from the first film.
  - Fabiano Di Leo as 4-year old Derek Jr.
- Billy Zane as himself
- Jon Daly as Agent Filippo, Valentina's boss at Interpol.
- Sting as himself, who is revealed to be Hansel's father.
- Benedict Cumberbatch as All, a non-binary fashion model

=== Cameos ===
- Beck Bennett as Geoff Mille (uncredited)
- Jerry Stiller as Maury Ballstein. This was Stiller's final film role before his death in 2020
- Katy Perry as herself
- Neil deGrasse Tyson as himself
- Tommy Hilfiger as himself
- Naomi Campbell as herself
- Justin Bieber as himself
- Jourdan Dunn as Natalka, one of Hansel's orgy
- Ariana Grande as SM girl (uncredited)
- Christina Hendricks as Seductress
- John Malkovich as Skip Taylor, a prisoner convicted for crimes against fashion
- Kiefer Sutherland as himself, one of Hansel's orgy
- Mika as hairdresser
- Skrillex as "Old and Lame" Show DJ
- Susan Boyle as herself
- ASAP Rocky as himself
- MC Hammer as himself
- Anna Wintour as herself
- Marc Jacobs as himself
- Alexander Skarsgård as Adam. Skarsgård previously played Meekus, one of Derek's model roommates, in the first film.
- Karlie Kloss as Eve
- Kate Moss as herself
- Alexander Wang as himself
- Valentino as himself
- Katie Couric as herself
- Christiane Amanpour as herself
- Jane Pauley as herself
- Natalie Morales as herself
- Soledad O'Brien as herself
- Don Lemon as himself
- Matt Lauer as himself
- Andy Dick as Don Atari's Posse. Dick previously played Olga the masseuse in the first film.
- Willie Nelson as himself
- Susan Sarandon as herself (uncredited)
- Lewis Hamilton as himself
- Joe Jonas as himself
- Jérôme Jarre as himself
- Stephen Hawking as himself
- Jim Lehrer as himself

== Production ==
In December 2008, Stiller confirmed that he wanted to make a sequel to Zoolander, saying: "I've been trying to get Zoolander 2 together and we've had a few scripts. I feel that is the sequel I really would like to do some day because I like the original and I would make sure it was something new and worthy of it first." When interviewed on the May 15, 2009 episode of Friday Night with Jonathan Ross, Stiller said he was looking at a number of scripts. By February 2010, Justin Theroux, who also co-wrote Tropic Thunder with Stiller, was hired to write and direct the sequel. By the following month, Stiller confirmed he would be co-writing the script, stating, "We're in the process of getting a script written, so it's in the early stages. But yeah, it's going to happen." At some later, unspecified point, Stiller had taken over as director. On the December 17, 2010 episode of The Tonight Show with Jay Leno, Owen Wilson said a Zoolander sequel would likely be made, tentatively titled Twolander.

In January 2011, Stiller confirmed that the script had been completed, and described the plot: "It's ten years later and most of it is set in Europe... it's basically Derek and Hansel... though the last movie ended on a happy note a lot of things have happened in the meantime. Their lives have changed and they’re not really relevant anymore. It's a new world for them. Will Ferrell is written into the script and he's expressed interest in doing it. I think Mugatu is an integral part of the Zoolander story, so yes, he features in a big way." In July 2012, Stiller described a difficult development process: "We have a script, as we've had for a little while, and [the film] is not quite coming together right now but I hope it does. I would like to do it at some point in the future." In September 2014, Ferrell said of the sequel, "We are actually supposed to do a read-through of a sequel script soon, and Mugatu is a part of it."

By November 20, 2014, Penélope Cruz had joined the cast, and by January 29, 2015, Christine Taylor was confirmed to reprise her role as Matilda Jeffries. By February 9, 2015, it was announced filming was set to commence at Rome's Cinecittà studios in the spring of 2015. On March 10, 2015, Stiller and Wilson appeared at the Paris Fashion Week in character as Derek Zoolander and Hansel McDonald. On April 13, 2015, it was revealed Cyrus Arnold had been cast as Zoolander's son. On April 21, 2015, Fred Armisen joined the cast. In May 2015, Stiller revealed via Instagram the casting of Kyle Mooney, Beck Bennett, and Nathan Lee Graham. Stiller offered former First Lady Laura Bush a cameo appearance in the orgy scene, but she politely declined.

Principal photography began on April 7, 2015, and ended on July 13, 2015. The film was shot at Cinecittà studios in Rome, Italy. During production, a 96 camera bullet time rig was used to catch the end sequence, but the footage was not used.

== Marketing ==
Paramount partnered with Fiat Chrysler Automobiles to feature Derek Zoolander on their advertising campaign for the Fiat 500X. Ben Stiller and Owen Wilson walked in character as Zoolander and Hansel at the Valentino show at 2015 Paris Fashion Week, and Stiller and Penélope Cruz also appeared in character in the February 2016 issue of Vogue.

== Release ==
Zoolander 2 was released in theaters on February 12, 2016. The world premiere was held in London, England on February 4, 2016, and the North American premiere was held in New York on February 9, 2016. During the London premiere, Stiller set the Guinness World Record for the longest selfie stick, at 8.56 meters (28 feet 1 inch) long.

=== Home media ===
Zoolander 2 was released on DVD and Blu-ray on May 24, 2016.

=== Transgender casting controversy ===
On November 20, 2015, shortly after the release of the second trailer, the film received controversy from members of the LGBT community over Benedict Cumberbatch's portrayal of All, a non-binary model, which was deemed by the community as "an over-the-top, cartoonish mockery of androgyne/trans/non-binary individuals", with the community calling for a boycott of the film over the transgender character. In a December 7, 2015 interview with The Wrap, Justin Theroux said of the transgender boycott, stating that it "hurts my feelings", comparing it to the 2008 protest by disabled groups of the film Tropic Thunder for Robert Downey Jr.'s character's repeated use of the word "retard". Will Ferrell defended Cumberbatch's portrayal in a December 21, 2015 interview on BBC 1's Newsbeat. In a January 28, 2022 interview with Variety as part of its "Actors on Actors" with co-star Penelope Cruz, Cumberbatch stated that if the film had been made today, he wouldn't have played All, believing that the role should be played by a trans actor or a non-binary actor instead.

== Reception ==
=== Box office ===
Zoolander 2 grossed $28.8 million in the U.S. and Canada and $27.9 million in other territories, for a worldwide total of $56.7 million against a budget of $50 million.

In the United States and Canada, pre-release tracking suggested the film would gross $17–20 million from 3,300 theaters in its opening weekend, trailing Deadpool ($55–65 million projection) but similar to fellow newcomer How to Be Single. The film made $750,000 from its Thursday night previews and $4.9 million on its first day. It went on to gross $14 million in its opening weekend, finishing fourth at the box office, behind Deadpool ($132.8 million), Kung Fu Panda 3 ($19.8 million), and How to Be Single ($17.9 million). In its second weekend, the film grossed $5.5 million (a 60.3% drop), finishing seventh at the box office.

In a February 2022 interview with Esquire, Ben Stiller said he was glad the film flopped at the box office, stating that if the film had performed well financially, he wouldn't have been able to pursue doing more serious, non-comedic work such as Escape at Dannemora and Severance. Appearing on David Duchovny's Fail Better podcast in April 2024, Stiller said the negative reaction was "blindsiding" to him and that "it definitely affected [him] for a long time".

=== Critical response ===
On Rotten Tomatoes, the film has an approval rating of 21% based on reviews from 230 critics, with an average rating of 4.40/10. The site's critical consensus reads, "Zoolander No. 2 has more celebrity cameos than laughs – and its meager handful of memorable gags outnumbers the few worthwhile ideas discernible in its scattershot rehash of a script." On Metacritic, the film has a score of 34 out of 100 based on reviews from 42 critics, indicating "generally unfavorable reviews". Audiences polled by CinemaScore gave the film an average grade of "C+" on an A+ to F scale, the same grade earned by its predecessor.

Peter Travers of Rolling Stone wrote: "Zoolander 2 sweats its silly ass off to please. The results are scattershot. But when it works — oh, baby. There's a bit with Justin Bieber and a selfie that, well, no spoilers." Justin Chang of Variety gave it a negative review: "The results may delight those who believe recycled gags and endless cameos to be the very essence of great screen comedy, but everyone else will likely recognize Stiller’s wannabe Magnum opus as a disappointment-slash-misfire, the orange mocha crappuccino of movie sequels."

=== Accolades ===
Award	Category	Subject	Result
Golden Raspberry Awards	Worst Picture	Stuart Cornfeld	Nominated
Golden Raspberry Awards	Worst Picture	Scott Rudin	Nominated
Golden Raspberry Awards	Worst Picture	Clayton Townsend	Nominated
Golden Raspberry Awards	Worst Picture	Ben Stiller	Nominated
Golden Raspberry Awards	Worst Director	Ben Stiller	Nominated
Golden Raspberry Awards	Worst Actor	Ben Stiller	Nominated
Golden Raspberry Awards	Worst Screen Combo	Ben Stiller	Nominated
Golden Raspberry Awards	Worst Screen Combo	Owen Wilson	Nominated
Golden Raspberry Awards	Worst Supporting Actor	Owen Wilson	Nominated
Golden Raspberry Awards	Worst Supporting Actor	Will Ferrell	Nominated
Golden Raspberry Awards	Worst Supporting Actress	Kristen Wiig	Won
Golden Raspberry Awards	Worst Prequel, Remake, Rip-off or Sequel		Nominated
Teen Choice Award	Choice Movie: Comedy		Nominated
