= The Boys: The Sherman Brothers' Story =

- Theatrical release poster
- Directed by: Gregory V. Sherman; Jeffrey C. Sherman
- Produced by: Gregory V. Sherman; Jeffrey C. Sherman; Executive: Stuart Cornfeld; Ben Stiller; Stephen Buchsbaum
- Starring: Richard M. Sherman; Robert B. Sherman
- Cinematography: Richard Numeroff
- Edited by: Rich Evirs
- Music by: Richard M. Sherman; Robert B. Sherman
- Production companies: Walt Disney Pictures; Red Hour Films
- Distributed by: Walt Disney Studios; Motion Pictures
- Release dates: April 24, 2009 (San Francisco International Film Festival); May 22, 2009 (United States)
- Running time: 101 minutes
- Country: United States
- Language: English
- Box office: $55,513

The Boys: The Sherman Brothers' Story is a 2009 American documentary film about the Sherman Brothers (Richard M. and Robert B.). The film is directed and produced by their sons, Gregory V. Sherman and Jeff Sherman, and released through Walt Disney Pictures. Ben Stiller acted as executive producer for the film.

== Content ==
The film deals with professional growth and estrangement between the Academy Award-winning music composing team through the years, who are best known for their up-beat Disney music. It contains interviews with family members and several individuals in the film industry, including actors such as Julie Andrews and Dick Van Dyke (who worked with the Sherman Brothers on Mary Poppins), producers (Roy E. Disney), fellow film composers (John Williams and Stephen Schwartz) and film critics (Leonard Maltin).

== Cast ==
- Richard M. Sherman
- Robert B. Sherman
- Roy E. Disney
- Julie Andrews
- Dick Van Dyke
- John Williams
- Stephen Schwartz
- Leonard Maltin
- Debbie Reynolds
- Hayley Mills
- Alan Menken
- Randy Newman
- John Lasseter
- John Landis
- Karen Dotrice
- Samuel Goldwyn, Jr.
- Micky Dolenz
- Kenny Loggins
- Robert Osborne
- Tony Walton
- Cameron Mackintosh
- Ben Stiller
- Jon Turteltaub
- Lesley Ann Warren
- Johnny Whitaker
- Sheldon Harnick
- Maury Yeston
- Will Smith
- Linda Ercoli
- A. J. Carothers
- Guy Pohlman

== Release ==
The film premiered at the 2009 San Francisco Film Festival and the Newport Beach Film Festival in April 2009. It opened to limited release (three theaters) on 22 May 2009: the Metreon in San Francisco, the Landmark Sunshine Cinema in New York City, and the Landmark Regent Theatre in Los Angeles.

=== Critical reception ===
The Boys: the Sherman Brothers' Story received overall positive early reviews from both Disneyana fans, and mainstream media outlets. Rotten Tomatoes gives it a freshness rating of 89%. The New York Times called it "an irresistible documentary portrait of the brothers made by their sons". USA Today gave it three stars (out of four), stating it was "...a fascinating love story and moving tribute to Disney films, the joys of making music, the bonds of family and enduring partnerships." The San Francisco Chronicle called the film "an excellent film - entertaining and informative and sometimes stunning in its display of the personal demons shared by these two geniuses. "The Boys" is a loving tribute, but it's also like watching the plot of a William Faulkner novel played out in the middle of Disneyland."

While The Hollywood Reporter praised the film, it believed that the box office potential was modest, as the film would only appeal to "film buffs, Disneyphiles and fans of wholesome film musicals."

=== Box office ===
In its first weekend of release (May 22–24, 2009), it grossed $14,682 on five screens, with an estimated $2,292 per screen.
