= Safe Men =

- Theatrical release poster
- Directed by: John Hamburg
- Written by: John Hamburg
- Produced by: Ellen Bronfman
- Starring: Sam Rockwell; Steve Zahn; Harvey Fierstein; Michael Lerner; Paul Giamatti
- Cinematography: Michael Barrett
- Edited by: Suzanne Pillsbury; M. Scott Smith
- Music by: Theodore Shapiro
- Production companies: Andell Entertainment; Blue Guitar Films
- Distributed by: October Films
- Release date: August 7, 1998
- Running time: 88 minutes
- Language: English
- Budget: $1 million
- Box office: $45,724

Safe Men is a 1998 American crime comedy film written and directed by John Hamburg (in his directorial debut), and starring Sam Rockwell and Steve Zahn as a pair of aspiring lounge singers who are mistaken for ace safe crackers.

== Plot ==
Sam and Eddie are unsuccessful musicians who are unwittingly recruited as professional safe-crackers by a local mobster. Veal Chop finds them in a bar where two famed ones hang out regularly, and incorrectly assumes they are them.

Veal Chop coerces Sam and Eddie into supposedly breaking into an older man's home to crack his safe for easy money. In reality it is his boss's place, local Jewish gangster Bernie Gayle. Threatening to contact local police if they do not comply, he gives them a limited time to crack open three safes.

While the singer-song writers try to hide their incompetence, Sam falls in love with Hannah, the daughter of a fence they are supposed to rob. He asks her out, but she explains she no longer wants to date thieves.

Sam bumps into Hannah, serving orderves in the barber shop her dad Good Stuff Leo uses as a front for his fencing operation. He again asks her out, but is not available for that night, as he and Eddie are committed that evening. Hannah instead invites Sam to her family's Rosh Hashanah celebration the next day.

Sam and Eddie are unsuccessful at cracking the next safe. Bernie reprimands them, but later confides in Veal Chop that the safe was emptied. Little does anyone know that the real safe crackers, Mitchell and Frank, cut open the safe while the other two fumbled with the combination lock. Bernie assumed Sam and Eddie did it, but are ballsy and kept the money.

At the party, Good Stuff retells the story of a client who purchased highly flammable slacks from him, who went up in flames before his eyes at a barbecue. Later, Sam and Hannah's makeout session is interrupted by her ex Frank. He comes to the house holding a boombox over his head, blaring a song. Hannah again turns him down.

Sam and Eddie are then tasked with breaking into the temple's safe while Bernie, jr. reads the Torah for his bar mitzvah. After familiarizing himself with his father's safe cracking book, Eddie successfully opens it. They think they are in the clear, when Bernie insists they break into Leo's office safe. When Sam breaks the news to Hannah, she breaks up with him.

Thanks to Eddie's newly found, the friends successfully break into the safe, beating out Mitchell and Frank, who congratulate them. Sam gets the safe crackers to steal back the 94' Stanley Cup after they left it at Bernie's. Hannah discovers it was Sam's idea, and that Leo has sent a heavy to break Sam's collar bone, so she hurries to the bar mitzvah party.

There, Hannah gets Leflore to back off, then she makes up with Sam. He previously found out that Eddie had decided to follow in his dad's footsteps, joining Mitchell and Frank's crew.

== Cast ==
- Sam Rockwell as Sam
- Steve Zahn as Eddie
- John Hamburg as Phillip
- Mark Ruffalo as Frank
- Josh Pais as Mitchell
- Paul Giamatti as Veal Chop
- Peter Dinklage as Leflore

== Reception ==
In August 1998, The New York Times called it a "low-energy comedy with sufficient signs of willingness to stray off the beaten track to indicate that somewhere down the line its writer and director, John Hamburg, will create something far better." Roger Ebert gave the film one star out of four, saying it "whirls wildly from one bright idea to the next, trying to find a combo that will hold the movie together. No luck." Mick LaSalle gave it "There's no dramatic urgency, no distinct point of view, no question of plot to keep an audience interested. All Safe Men has is the charm of the actors and the occasional friskiness of the writing. That's almost enough to keep the picture alive, minute by minute. Alive is not the same as thriving, but it's better than dead.

In March 2002, The A.V. Club began its review with:

The vast majority of direct-to-video films are not very good, lacking not only star power and budget, but ideas and imagination. Every once in a while, though, a movie is denied a proper theatrical release not because it's bad, but because it just isn't the sort of film for which a studio is willing to risk a multimillion-dollar advertising budget. Safe Men is one of these movies, a modest but engaging crime comedy.

A.V. Club also called the film a "sort of Bottle Rocket Lite, sharing a deadpan, consistently sustained comic tone, as well as a palpable affection for its characters. Almost everyone in Safe Men is pathetic on some level, but first-time writer-director John Hamburg grants even his least significant characters a humanity that gives the film a sort of warm, fuzzy glow.

== Songs from the film ==
Title	Performed by	Written by
"Can You Get to That"	Funkadelic	George Clinton, Ernie Harris
"Hole In The Wall"	The Packers	Nathaniel Nathan, Steve Cooper, Al Jackson, Booker T. Jones
"Bring It Home Daddy"	Ted Hawkins	Ted Hawkins
"Chains & Things"	B.B. King	B.B. King, Dave Clark
"Jesus Is Waiting"	Al Green	Al Green
"More Mess On My Thing"	The New Process	Whitefield, Baral, Whitefield
"Baby Come Back"	Player	Peter Beckett, John Charles Crowley
"Shake Your Thing"	E.U.	Rudolph, Ronald, and O'Kelly Isley
"Tell Me Something Good"	Rufus & Chaka Khan	Stevie Wonder
"It's Your Thing"	Andy Mauro	Rudolph, Ronald, and O'Kelly Isley
"Bust a Move"	Young MC	Michael Ross, Matt Dike, Marvin Young
"Got To Be Real"	Cheryl Lynn	Cheryl Lynn, David Paich, David Foster
"Car Wash"	Rose Royce	Norman Whitfield
"Sirius"	Alan Parsons Project	Alan Parsons, Eric Woolfson
"All Out Of Love"	Air Supply	Graham Russel, Clive Davis
"Shake Your Groove Thing"	Peaches & Herb	Fredrick Perren, Dino Fekaris

== DVD release ==
The movie was released on DVD by Universal Pictures under the Focus Features label on August 15, 2006 with new commentary features and Tick, a short film by John Hamburg about independently contracted bomb defusers starring Michael Showalter.

Mill Creek Entertainment released the Blu-ray version on July 12, 2022.
