= Joan Hamburg =

American radio personality

- Born: August 12, 1935 (age 91)
- Education: Barnard College
- Occupation: Radio personality

Joan Hamburg (born August 12, 1935) is a radio personality in New York City. In the early 1970s Hamburg started her radio career with small consumer (bargain shopping) segments on the long-running Rambling with Gambling morning show, eventually earning her own show.

== Early life and education ==
She grew up in Lawrence on Long Island and attended Barnard College, before embarking on an advertising career.

== Radio show ==
Hamburg is extremely celebrity, society, and show-business-conscious, and billed as "New York Radio's First Lady." The orientation of her broadcasts shifted dramatically from consumerism to a radio version of the Today Show, including the day's news, food and restaurant features, and celebrity and newsmaker interviews. Hamburg still takes consumer questions, and gives listeners advice about restaurants, events, and the like. Carol Channing, a regular listener, once called Joan Hamburg "The Yellow Pages of The World".

Hamburg frequently broadcasts from locations outside the studio, including Sardi's, the Hamptons, Canyon Ranch, The Villages, Florida. She worked closely with her production staff to provide information and respond to listeners' inquiries during broadcasts.

Beginning in January 2014, her Monday-Friday program became a feature on WOR/710 from 10:00-Noon, Saturday and Sunday. In May 2014 her program was cancelled after 35 years with the station. She joined WABC/770 in September 2014.

As of September 2020 Hamburg was heard on WABC/770, Sundays 2:00-3:00 PM. She no longer appears on the Sunday lineup. Her program is now presented in the form of a podcast on the WABC radio website.

She was inducted in the Class of 2018 Radio Hall of Fame in November 2018.

== Personal life ==
Hamburg's daughter, Liz, contributes to the show and sometimes appears as a fill-in host. Her son is screenwriter John Hamburg (Meet The Parents, Meet The Fockers and Along Came Polly).
