= Sammy (TV series) =

- Sammy Blake (left) and James Blake (right)
- Genre: Animated sitcom
- Created by: David Spade; Drake Sather
- Voices of: David Spade; Bob Odenkirk; Andy Dick; Maura Tierney; Harland Williams; David Cross
- Narrated by: David Spade
- Theme music composer: Chris Lang; Eric Cunningham; Sebastian Robertson
- Opening theme: "Sammy" (instrumental)
- Composer: Jim Latham
- Country of origin: United States
- Original language: English
- No. of seasons: 1
- No. of episodes: 13 (11 unaired)

Production
- Executive producers: David Spade; Drake Sather; Richard Raynis; Brad Grey; Marc Gurvitz
- Editor: Mark Deimel
- Running time: 22 minutes
- Production companies: Desert Rat Productions; Brad Grey Television; NBC Studios; Adelaide Productions

Original release
- Network: NBC
- Release: August 8 – August 15, 2000

Sammy is an American adult animated sitcom that aired on NBC in 2000. Created by comedians David Spade and Drake Sather, the series only had a two-week run, from August 8 until August 15, 2000. The artstyle of the series is reminiscent of Klasky Csupo cartoons as Everett Peck was the character designer for the series.

Sammy, along with another animated sitcom, God, the Devil and Bob, was conceived by NBC in order to capitalize on the fledgling trend of animated programs geared towards adults. When God, the Devil and Bob attracted low ratings and controversy due to its subject matter, it was quickly cancelled and sold to Cartoon Network to be a part of its Adult Swim block years later. This left Sammy in limbo, not premiering until early August 2000 with minimal promotion and fanfare. NBC was contractually obligated to air the first two episodes, and once both premiered, the show was quietly cancelled. According to Olivia Hack (who voiced Lola), 13 episodes were produced.

It was the last series by Adelaide Productions to use traditional cel animation aside from the opening theme being animated in digital ink and paint.

== Premise ==
The show is an animated sitcom whose central characters are James "Jamie" Blake and his father Sammy, both of whom are voiced by David Spade. Within the show, the younger Blake is a successful actor who lives in Los Angeles with his two brothers. The show features plot lines in which the father attempts to reconcile with his three estranged sons. Spade said that the show took inspiration from his own estrangement from his father.

== Cast ==
- David Spade as Sammy Blake and James Blake
- Harland Williams as Todd Blake
- Bob Odenkirk as Gary Blake
- Maura Tierney as Kathy Kelly
- Andy Dick as Mark Jacobs
- Julia Sweeney as Marie La Peer
- Jeffrey Tambor as Steve La Peer
- Olivia Hack as Lola Blake (episodes 3–13)
- Janeane Garofalo as Emily Blake and Rebecca Rebeccatin
- Mila Kunis as Lola Blake (episode 2)
- Pauly Shore as Nelson
- David Cross as Craig Blake
- A. J. Benza as himself
- Alyssa Milano as herself
- David Duchovny as himself
- Drew Hastings as Dr. Breman, Referee and Border Guard
- Frank van Keeken as Theadeus
- Mark Fite as Bartender and Doorman
- Tony Plana as Kiosk Owner and El Capitan
- Becky Thyre as Girl 1 and Microphone Girl
- Candi Milo as Pilar and Mexican Woman
- Rolando Molina as Barkeep, Mexican Guy, Deputy and Lieutenant
- Sally Kellerman as Cleo
- Nia Vardalos

== Episodes ==
No.	Title	Directed by	Written by	Original release date
1	"Swimmin' Pools, Movie Stars"	Bob Hathcock & Rich Wilkie	Drake Sather & David Spade	Unaired
James Blake reunites with his father, Sammy Blake, as he tries to re-establish relations with his family just as James' movie career is taking off. James' superagent, Mark Jacobs, attempts to keep the 'heat' on James while fending off Sammy's attempts at getting involved in James' career.
2	"House of Pain"	Bob Boyle & Todd Frederiksen	Sam Johnson & Chris Marcil	Unaired
James hears from his mother, Marie, that they're tearing down his childhood home to build a shopping center, so he gets the house delivered to James' residence on the back of a flatbed truck. Him, Gary, and Todd fight in terms of what to do with their childhood 'paradise.'
3	"Denver"	Jennifer Graves	Justin Adler	August 8, 2000
When James' mother Marie finds out that her ex-husband Sammy is living with James and Todd, she drags her new husband Steve out to Los Angeles to "save" them, but instead finds herself again falling for his charms. James' agent Mark gets a book deal for James, but when it has to be written in two days, he forces Mark and Kathy to write it instead.
4	"Malibu"	Dave Edwards	Bonnie Kallman	Unaired
James's plans to get some R&R by renting a house in Malibu are foiled when his entire family shows up to hang out. James & Sammy end up feuding over the affections of Cleo, a woman they meet on the beach, who turns out to be a stalker. Kathy and Mark look after Wiley and Lola at a celebrity children's party where Mark thinks he can make some 'contacts'. Gary and Emily have rekindled their romance with the help of Emily's new bikini.
5	"Fair"	Stephen Lewis	Glenn Eichler	Unaired
James is looking forward to a relaxing weekend at home, until he finds out his agent, Mark has booked him to appear as "Mongo Man" at the county fair. He invites his brothers Todd and Gary and Gary's family to come along, but Gary doesn't want Sammy coming because of his bad influence on the kids. Gary's fears become real when Sammy stows away in the family car and then accidentally is left alone with Gary's kids, who end up stranded upside down on a broken ride while Sammy is at the bar.
6	"Sammy Makes Amends"	Chuck Klein & Erik Wiese	Frank van Keeken	August 15, 2000
A joy ride in James' new sports car ends in a near-death experience for Sammy, causing him to reassess his past and use his "second chance" to make amends with his sons, with disastrous results. Incensed by their ungratefulness at his attempt to become a "normal" father, Sammy runs away to Mexico, and when his sons try bring him home, they end up in trouble and Sammy must come to their rescue in a Tijuana jail. James' agent Mark has brokered a deal that will bring James' "Mongo Man" movie character to toy store shelves as an action figure. But a broken mold and an ever-accommodating Kathy as the new model turn the toy hero into a doll with a broader appeal than they had originally planned.
7	"Son of Sammy"	Tom Ellery	J.B. Cook	Unaired
James bribes Sammy into spending a quality-time weekend with Gary and his wife, with disastrous results. Meanwhile, James takes in his assistant Kathy when she breaks up with her boyfriend. Note: Pauly Shore guest stars as Kathy's ex-boyfriend.
8	"Biography"	Rich Wilkie	Dan McGrath	Unaired
James learns he will be the subject of an A&E Biography profile, but the program will instead air on the E! Network. No one, particularly James, looks forward to being grilled by A. J. Benza.
9	"100th Episode Party"	Bob Boyle	Larry Solomon	Unaired
James throws the 100th episode party of the show Hey Rebecca. Meanwhile, Kathy grows annoyed at her role as James' assistant, and Sammy is dared by Gary to get a job and work for an entire week. Note: Alyssa Milano guest stars as herself.
10	"Gary's Trophy"	Todd Frederiksen	Justin Adler	Unaired
Gary wins an award from accounting, and the entire family goes back to their home in Denver for Gary's award ceremony.
11	"Mark's 40th"	Rafael Rosado	Bonnie Kallman	Unaired
A group of agents sit together and retell the story of when Mark Jacobs quits his job as James's agent during his 40th birthday. Note: David Duchovny guest stars as himself.
12	"Gabriella's Return"	Tim Eldred	Keith Leslie	Unaired
Todd reunites with Gabriella, the mother of their two children and moves in with the family after Lola ends up in her house. Note: Megan Mullally guest stars as Gabriella.
13	"Earthquake"	Stephen Lewis	Drake Sather	Unaired
After Sammy ruins his son's baseball trophy, James suspects that his father was lying about going to his childhood baseball game, so he finally decides to kick him out of his house. Things seem to go uphill until an earthquake happens in Hollywood which separates the Blake family. James and the others try to find their family members among the wreckage in Los Angeles. Meanwhile, James' agent Mark marries hundred-year-old celebrity Louise Peaks.

== Critical reception ==
David Bianculli of the New York Daily News criticized the show for a lack of humor. He also thought that Spade voicing both of the lead characters was "distracting". A review in Variety was negative toward the show for similar reasons.

== Broadcast ==
Citing low ratings, NBC withdrew the show after only two of its thirteen episodes aired.
