= Me Time (film) =

2022 film by John Hamburg

- Official release poster
- Directed by: John Hamburg
- Written by: John Hamburg
- Produced by: John Hamburg; Kevin Hart; Bryan Smiley
- Starring: Kevin Hart; Mark Wahlberg; Regina Hall; Luis Gerardo Méndez; Jimmy O. Yang
- Cinematography: Kris Kachikis
- Edited by: Melissa Bretherton
- Music by: Jeff Cardoni
- Production companies: Particular Pictures; HartBeat Productions
- Distributed by: Netflix
- Release date: August 26, 2022
- Running time: 101 minutes
- Country: United States
- Language: English
- Budget: $80 million

Me Time is a 2022 American buddy comedy film written and directed by John Hamburg. The film stars Kevin Hart, Mark Wahlberg, Regina Hall, Luis Gerardo Méndez, and Jimmy O. Yang. It is about a stay-at-home dad as he finds himself with some "me time" for the first time in years while his wife and kids are away. He reconnects with his former best friend Huck for a wild weekend that nearly upends his life.

Me Time was released on August 26, 2022, by Netflix. It received generally negative reviews.

== Plot ==
friends since high school, Sonny and Huck stopped meeting up every year on Huck's birthday 15 years ago following a near death experience Sonny went through.

Now Sonny is a stay-at-home dad, putting all of his focus on his family. Huck contacts him, as he does every year, for the annual celebration. Not wanting to attend, Sonny finds himself with some "me time" for the first time in years while his wife and kids are away.

After only a few days, Sonny is bored. He plays golf every day but it is terrible. He partakes in eating massive amounts of food at a big barbecue a few days in a row but projectile vomits. None of his friends can participate with him so he's lonely and bored and his kids don't seem to miss him. Sonny ends up going to Huck's wild weekend birthday bash. Arriving at the meeting point, everyone is skinny dipping. Afterwards they load onto Huck's chartered bus and put on matching track suits.

Meanwhile, Sonny's wife Maya and kids get a visit at the place her parents have taken them to from her wealthy client Armando, who Sonny fears is interested in her.

The bus dumps the party group in the desert, where there are communal yurts set up, and the plan is to forage for their food. They are given hardware to do it, so Sonny heads off to do number two. A mountain lion chases him, but he wards it off by stabbing it with an EpiPen, and is nicknamed Big Dog. That evening, when Sonny calls his family, he finds out Armando visited them by seaplane. Sonny gets jealous when he hears that Armando is offering Maya a big project. The call escalates into a big shouting match until they hang up on him.

Stan, Huck's loan shark arrives, seeking the $47,000 owed him. His muscle Dorit breaks Sonny's finger, then burns down the site. Once everyone goes, Sonny stays behind to help Huck salvage what they can. Huck confesses he's fallen on hard times and is lonely. On their way back to LA in an Uber, Sonny spots Armando. The three break in and pull off some gross pranks, but inadvertently hit one of his tortoises. All is caught on camera.

Sonny offers his house for Huck to continue his birthday celebration, as his family is still away. Someone shares a party notification via social media, and it becomes a rager. Seal comes, and Sonny jams with him. Just as the party is at the most out of control the family shows up, and Maya leaves with the kids. She asks him to clear out and stay away for a bit.

While they are separated, Sonny tries to make amends, apologizing to Armando and working hard on the talent show. As the closing act Dash, Sonny's son, has a meltdown declaring he hates the keyboard. Realising he's been selfish and overcontrolling, he apologizes to everyone, encouraging all who want to perform.

Sonny chases down Huck, convincing him to join him in a party planner company.

== Cast ==
- Kevin Hart as Sonny Fisher
- Mark Wahlberg as Huck Dembo
- Regina Hall as Maya Fisher, Sonny's wife
- Luis Gerardo Méndez as Armando Zavala
- Jimmy O. Yang as Stan Berman
- John Amos as Gil
- Anna Maria Horsford as Connie
- Andrew Santino as Alan Geller
- Deborah S. Craig as Bethany
- Naomi Ekperigin as Jill
- Drew Droege as Combover Stew
- Ilia Isorelýs Paulino as Thelma
- Tahj Mowry as Kabir
- Carlo Rota as Alberto
- Diane Delano as Crossing Guard Lenore
- Michelle DeShon as Skylar, the babysitter of Dash and Ava
- Che Tafari as Dashiell Fisher, Sonny and Maya's son
- Amentii Sledge as Ava Fisher, Sonny and Maya's daughter
- Seal as himself

== Production ==
In February 2021, Kevin Hart joined the cast. In August, Mark Wahlberg and Regina Hall were added to the cast. In September 2021, Jimmy O. Yang and Luis Gerardo Méndez joined the cast. Filming took place at Sunset Gower Studios. On September 14, a stage technician was taken to a local regional trauma center after suffering a 30-foot fall on set.

== Release ==
The film was released on August 26, 2022, by Netflix.

== Reception ==
On the review aggregator website Rotten Tomatoes, 7% of 70 critics' reviews are positive, with an average rating of 3.4/10. The website's consensus reads: "For viewers inexplicably hungry to see stars wasted on a desperately unfunny comedy, Me Time might be the movie of the year." Metacritic, which uses a weighted average, assigned the film a score of 25 out of 100, based on 20 critics, indicating "generally unfavorable" reviews. It is the lowest-rated film on the site to feature Mark Wahlberg and the second-lowest to feature Kevin Hart.

Tomris Laffly of RogerEbert.com gave Me Time a moderately favorable review, praising the characters but criticizing the screenplay and special effects. Peter Travers of ABC News was more critical of the film, calling it "dim-witted and disposable".
