= Christine Taylor =

American actress (born 1971)

- Taylor in 2026
- Born: Christine Joan Taylor; July 30, 1971 (age 55); Allentown, Pennsylvania, U.S.
- Occupation: Actress
- Years active: 1989–present
- Spouse: Ben Stiller (m. 2000)
- Children: 2

Christine Joan Taylor (born July 30, 1971) is an American actress. She has played Marcia Brady in The Brady Bunch Movie (1995) and A Very Brady Sequel (1996), and appeared in The Craft (1996), The Wedding Singer (1998), Zoolander (2001), and Dodgeball: A True Underdog Story (2004). In television, she has appeared in roles in Hey Dude, Arrested Development, and Search Party.

== Early life and education ==
Taylor was born on July 30, 1971, in Allentown, Pennsylvania, to Joan, a homemaker, and Albert E. "Skip" Taylor III, who owns a security company. She grew up in neighboring Wescosville, Pennsylvania, and has a younger brother.

Taylor was raised Roman Catholic and attended St. Thomas More School and then Allentown Central Catholic High School.

== Career ==
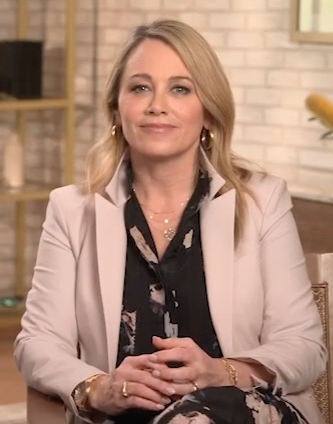
Taylor in May 2023

In 1989, Taylor began her acting career on the Nickelodeon children's television series Hey Dude, in which she portrayed the lifeguard Melody Hanson. She continued in that role through 1991, while making various guest appearances on other programs and films.

In 1995, Taylor was cast as Marcia Brady in The Brady Bunch Movie and later in A Very Brady Sequel. Following The Brady Bunch Movie, Taylor made several comedic guest appearances on the television series Ellen, landing the lead role in the television series Party Girl, based on the 1995 film of the same name, and more guest appearances on sitcoms, including Seinfeld and Friends.

In 1996, Taylor portrayed the racist school bully Laura Lizzie in the horror film The Craft, and also portrayed Drew Barrymore's cousin, Holly Sullivan, in the 1998 comedy The Wedding Singer. In 2001, she starred alongside her husband Ben Stiller in Zoolander. In 2005, Taylor guest starred on two episodes of Arrested Development, portraying the character Sally Sitwell; and the following year she performed in an episode of NBC's My Name Is Earl.

In July 2006, Taylor's husband Stiller announced plans to direct a CBS sitcom starring Taylor, but the series never aired. Taylor has appeared with Mandy Moore in both Dedication and License to Wed. In 2010, Taylor guest starred in Hannah Montana Forever and the Hallmark Channel Christmas movie Farewell Mr. Kringle.

In 2013, Taylor reprised her role as Sally Sitwell in two episodes of the revived fourth season of Arrested Development. She also guest starred on Elementary in 2017, playing villainess Gail Lundquist. From 2016 to 2022, Taylor had a recurring role as Gail on Search Party. In 2021, Taylor joined the cast of High Desert, an Apple TV series. In 2023, she reunited with her Hey Dude co-star David Lascher for the Hey Dude...The 90s Called! podcast.

== Personal life ==
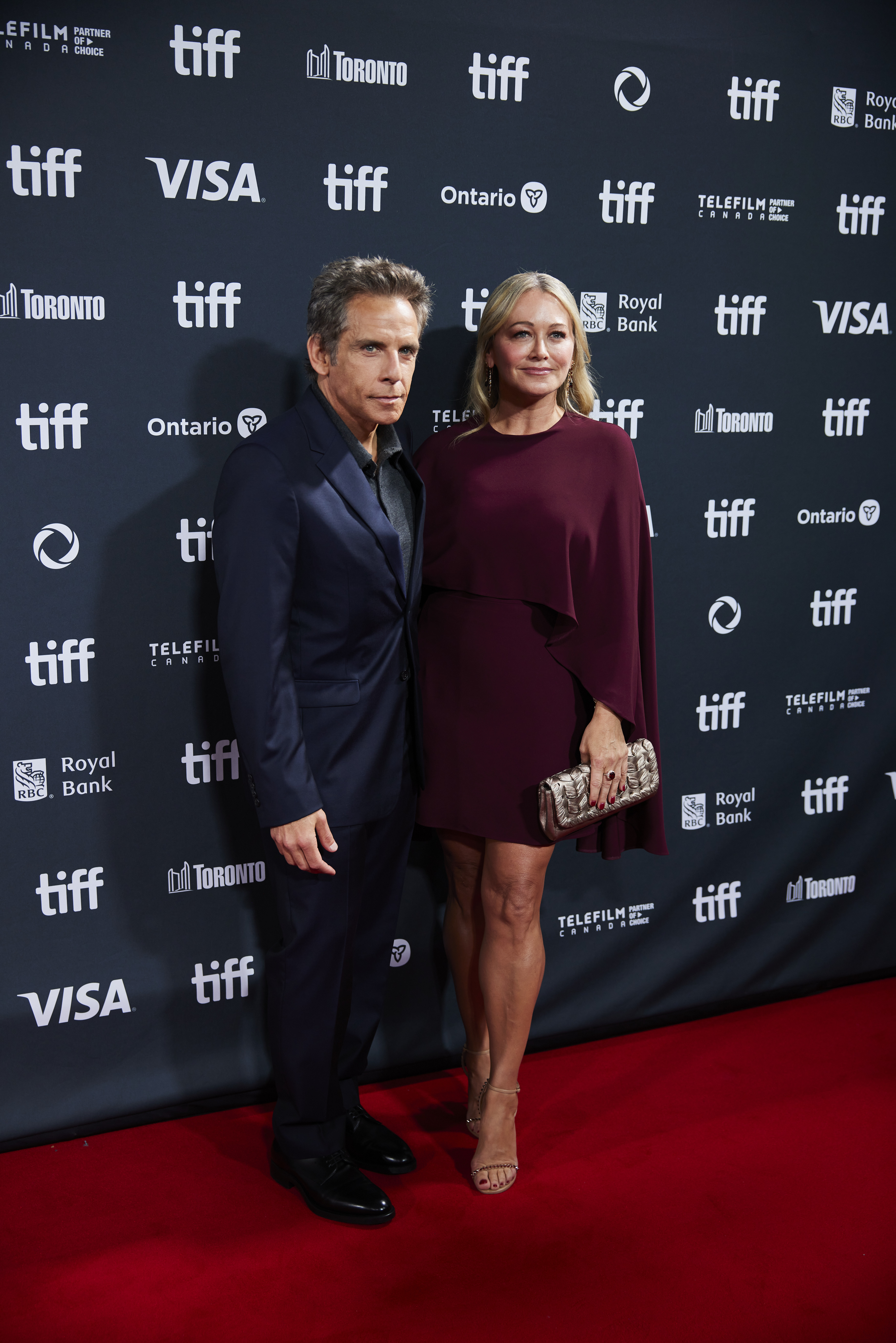
Taylor and Ben Stiller at the 2024 Toronto International Film Festival

Taylor dated actor Neil Patrick Harris from 1997 to 1998. Harris later spoke highly of Taylor, saying she was an "absolute catch" but he felt their relationship helped him accept his homosexuality because he realized he felt no "super sparks" during their time together.

In May 2000, Taylor married Ben Stiller, whom she first met in 1999 while they were both filming Heat Vision and Jack. Taylor and Stiller appeared together in the films Zoolander, Dodgeball: A True Underdog Story, Tropic Thunder, and Zoolander 2, and the television series Arrested Development and Curb Your Enthusiasm. They live in Westchester County, New York, and have a daughter and a son. Taylor and Stiller are both vegetarians.

After 17 years of marriage, Taylor and Stiller separated in 2017. The couple later reconciled after living together during the COVID-19 pandemic lockdown.

== Filmography ==
=== Film ===
| Year | Title | Role | Notes |
|---|---|---|---|
| 1993 | Calendar Girl | Melissa Smock | Credited as Christine Joan Taylor |
| 1993 | Showdown | Julie | |
| 1994 | Night of the Demons 2 | Terri | Direct-to-video |
| 1995 | Breaking Free | Brooke Kaufman | |
| 1995 | The Brady Bunch Movie | Marcia Brady | |
| 1996 | The Craft | Laura Lizzie | |
| 1996 | A Very Brady Sequel | Marcia Brady | |
| 1996 | Cat Swallows Parakeet and Speaks! | Ballerina | |
| 1997 | Campfire Tales | Lauren | Direct-to-video |
| 1998 | Denial | Sammie | |
| 1998 | The Wedding Singer | Holly Sullivan | |
| 1998 | Overnight Delivery | Kimberly Jasney | Direct-to-video |
| 1999 | Desperate but Not Serious | Lili | |
| 1999 | Kiss Toledo Goodbye | Deeann Emory | |
| 2001 | True Love | | |
| 2001 | Zoolander | Matilda Jeffries | |
| 2004 | Dodgeball: A True Underdog Story | Katherine "Kate" Veatch | |
| 2004 | The First Year's a Bitch | Andrea | |
| 2006 | Room 6 | Amy Roberts | Direct-to-video |
| 2006 | The Mirror | Herself | |
| 2007 | Dedication | Allison | |
| 2007 | License to Wed | Lindsey Jones | |
| 2007 | Kabluey | Betty | |
| 2008 | Tropic Thunder | Rebecca | |
| 2012 | The First Time | Mrs. Miller | |
| 2016 | Zoolander 2 | Matilda Jeffries | |
| 2016 | Little Boxes | Joan | |
| 2020 | Friendsgiving | Brianne | |
| 2024 | Sweethearts | Diane | |
| 2026 | Influenced | McKinley | |
| 2026 | The Dink | Bea | |
| TBA | Evil Genius | | Post-production |
| TBA | Rest and Relaxation | Joanie Danver | Post-production; also producer |

=== Television ===
Television
| Year | Title | Role | Notes |
|---|---|---|---|
| 1989–1991 | Hey Dude | Melody Hanson | Main cast |
| 1991 | Dallas | Margaret Barnes | Episode: "Conundrum" |
| 1991 | Saved by the Bell | Heather Brooks | 1 episode |
| 1991 | Life Goes On | Drama Student #1 | 1 episode; credited as Christine Joan Taylor |
| 1992 | Blossom | Patti | 1 episode; credited as Christine Joan Taylor |
| 1995 | Caroline in the City | Debbie | 1 episode |
| 1995 | Here Come the Munsters | Marilyn Hyde (Munster) | Television film |
| 1995 | Ellen | Karen Lewis | 2 episodes |
| 1996 | Party Girl | Mary | 4 episodes |
| 1996 | To the Ends of Time | Princess Stephanie | Television film |
| 1997 | Rewind | Dana | Unaired pilot |
| 1997 | Murphy Brown | Taffy | 1 episode |
| 1997 | Friends | Bonnie | 3 episodes |
| 1997 | Seinfeld | Ellen | Episode: "The Van Buren Boys" |
| 1999 | Cupid | Yvonne | 1 episode |
| 1999 | Heat Vision and Jack | The Sheriff | Unaired pilot |
| 2000 | Spin City | Catherine Moore | 1 episode |
| 2003 | Harry's Girl | Harry's Girl | Television film |
| 2004 | Curb Your Enthusiasm | Herself | 3 episodes |
| 2005 | The Commuters | Sandy | Television film |
| 2005–2019 | Arrested Development | Sally Sitwell | 11 episodes |
| 2006 | My Name Is Earl | Alex Meyers | Episode: "The Professor" |
| 2006 | American Dad! | Candy | Voice; 1 episode |
| 2006 | 52 Flights | Jennifer | Television film |
| 2010 | Phineas and Ferb | Mrs. Khaka Peü Peü | Voice; 1 episode |
| 2010 | Hannah Montana Forever | Lori | 2 episodes |
| 2010 | Farewell Mr. Kringle | Anna | Television film |
| 2011 | Rip City | Janet Marsh | Television film |
| 2012–2013 | Burning Love | Symphony | 4 episodes |
| 2015 | Sharing | Polly | Television film |
| 2016 | Zoolander: Super Model | Matilda Jeffries | Voice; television film |
| 2016–2022 | Search Party | Gail | 11 episodes |
| 2017 | Elementary | Gail Lundquist | 1 episode |
| 2017 | Odd Mom Out | Barrett | 1 episode |
| 2018 | Insatiable | Gayle Keene | 2 episodes |
| 2021 | iCarly | Argenthina Woolridge | 1 episode |
| 2023 | High Desert | Dianne | Recurring role |
