= Blades of Glory =

2007 film directed by Josh Gordon and Will Speck

- Theatrical release poster
- Directed by: Will Speck Josh Gordon
- Screenplay by: Jeff Cox; Craig Cox; John Altschuler; Dave Krinsky
- Story by: Busy Philipps; Craig Cox; Jeff Cox
- Produced by: Ben Stiller; John Jacobs; Stuart Cornfeld
- Starring: Will Ferrell; Jon Heder; Will Arnett; Amy Poehler; William Fichtner; Jenna Fischer; Craig T. Nelson
- Cinematography: Stefan Czapsky
- Edited by: Richard Pearson
- Music by: Theodore Shapiro
- Production companies: DreamWorks Pictures; MTV Films; Red Hour Films; Smart Entertainment
- Distributed by: Paramount Pictures
- Release date: March 30, 2007
- Running time: 93 minutes
- Country: United States
- Language: English
- Budget: $61 million
- Box office: $145.7 million

Blades of Glory is a 2007 American sports comedy film directed by Will Speck and Josh Gordon, written by Jeff Cox, Craig Cox, John Altschuler and Dave Krinsky. It stars Will Ferrell and Jon Heder as a mismatched pair of banned figure skaters who become teammates upon discovering a loophole that will allow them to compete in the sport again; Will Arnett, Amy Poehler, William Fichtner, Jenna Fischer, and Craig T. Nelson are featured in supporting roles. The idea for the film was conceived by Busy Philipps, who "fleshed out the screenplay"; however, co-writers Jeff and Craig Cox dropped her name from the script, with Philipps ultimately receiving just a story credit.

The film was produced by DreamWorks Pictures, MTV Films, Red Hour Films and Smart Entertainment. Released on March 30, 2007, by Paramount Pictures, it received generally positive reviews from critics and grossed $145.7 million worldwide against a $61 million budget.

== Plot ==
At the 2002 World Winter Sport Games, raunchy sex addict Chazz Michael Michaels and sheltered, effeminate Jimmy MacElroy tie for the men's single skating gold. Standing together on the podium, the two argue and begin fighting. They are stripped of their medals and banned from competitive skating for life.

Three and a half years later, both are working in demoralizing jobs. Chazz performs in costume in a children's ice show, while Jimmy works at a sporting goods store. Jimmy's obsessed fan, Hector, reveals a loophole in the skating rules: Jimmy is banned from men's singles skating, but not from pairs skating.

Jimmy contacts his former coach, Robert, hoping to compete in the upcoming 2006 World Winter Sport Games. Seeking a pairs partner at the same children's ice show, he runs into Chazz, who was just fired for drunkenness. They fight again and are arrested. Watching news video of their unintentionally balletic brawl, Coach Robert gets an idea and convinces them to skate as the first-ever male-male pairs team.

Robert arranges a secret practice rink, hires a choreographer, and puts them up in his cabin, stipulating that they learn to get along. Jimmy and Chazz start to bond and perform well at the Winter Sports Games qualifiers, alarming brother and sister competitors Stranz and Fairchild Van Waldenberg. Stranz and Fairchild guilt their younger sister Katie into secretly filming Jimmy and Chazz practicing. Jimmy and Katie are mutually attracted, and Chazz coaches Jimmy on courting her. After Jimmy and Katie go on a date, her siblings threaten to harm Jimmy unless she seduces Chazz to create a rift between the men.

To impress the judges, Coach Robert wants Jimmy and Chazz to perform the complicated and perilous "Iron Lotus" maneuver. In the only prior attempt, the man decapitated the woman with his skates; Robert believes it failed because it required two men to execute.

Katie pretends to be a member of Chazz's sex addicts meeting, then invites Chazz to her room and tries to seduce him. To her relief, Chazz refuses out of respect for Jimmy, but can't resist grabbing her breasts just as Jimmy arrives. Outraged, Jimmy flees.

Stranz and Fairchild kidnap Chazz and Jimmy to sabotage their performance. Chazz escapes and skates his way to the arena with Stranz in hot pursuit. Fairchild reveals to Jimmy that they forced Katie have sex with Chazz to make Jimmy jealous, but Chazz wouldn't go through with it. Jimmy, overjoyed, also escapes.

Chazz and Jimmy arrive at the ice rink just in time to compete. Fairchild deliberately breaks her necklace to spill pearls onto the ice. Chazz skates over one and breaks his ankle, rendering him unable to perform his role in the Iron Lotus. Although they have never practiced each other's parts, Jimmy and Chazz switch places and perform perfectly to win the competition.

Jimmy reconciles with Katie, and Stranz and Fairchild are arrested. Jimmy and Chazz are awarded the gold medal and fly off into the sky via rockets on their skates.

== Cast ==
- Will Ferrell as Chazz Michael Michaels, a self-taught professional skater. Chad Brennan serves as a skating double of Chazz.
- Jon Heder as Jimmy MacElroy, a professional skater. Ethan Burgess serves as a skating double for Jimmy.
  - Zachary Ferren as young Jimmy MacElroy
- Will Arnett as Stranz Van Waldenberg, a rival skater of Chazz and Jimmy.
- Amy Poehler as Fairchild Van Waldenberg, a skater and the sister of Stranz.
  - Tiffany Scott as Fairchild's Skate Double
- William Fichtner as Darren MacElroy, a wealthy man and former horse breeder who adopts orphans with exceptional athletic abilities like he did with Jimmy while also said to have controversial training methods for those he adopts.
- Jenna Fischer as Katie Van Waldenberg, the younger sister of Stranz and Fairchild.
- Romany Malco as Jesse, a choreographer who helps Coach Robert Goddard train Jimmy and Chazz.
- Craig T. Nelson as Robert Goddard, Jimmy's skating coach who later trains Jimmy and Chazz.
- Nick Swardson as Hector, an obsessive, psychotic fan of Jimmy who informs him of a loophole that will enable him to bypass the ban.
- Rob Corddry as Bryce
- Scott Hamilton as Himself
- Jim Lampley as Himself
- Nick Jameson as PA Announcer
- Tom Virtue as Floor Manager
- William Daniels as Ebbers, the commissioner of the National Figure Skating Association.
- Brian Boitano, Peggy Fleming, Dorothy Hamill, and Nancy Kerrigan as Federation Judges
- Remy Girard as Father St. Pierre
- Luciana Carro as Sammy
- Luke Wilson as Sex Addicts Counselor
- James Michael Connor as Surly Reporter – Montreal
- Phil Reeves as Father
- Matt Levin as Matt
- Matt Evers as Skate Tree
- Stephanie Courtney as Reporter at Sign Ups
- Lisa-Marie Allen as Middle-Aged Sweater Mom
- Kyle Bornheimer as Rink PA Nationals
- Sasha Cohen as Herself
- Kerry Rossall as Fire Extinguisher
- Andy Richter as Mountie

== Production ==
The film was based on Busy Philipps' idea and she worked on the screenplay. However, in an oral history about the movie for Nerdist, Craig Cox fully attributed the idea of Blades of Glory to his brother, Jeff Cox. The oral history has since been updated with information about Philipps' contributions. Phillips discussed the incident in her memoir, This Will Only Hurt A Little, stating that she should be credited as a co-writer in the credits and that she had registered the idea with the Writers Guild of America West at its inception, having come up with the concept – even suggesting Will Ferrell as one of the two co-leads (alongside Ben Stiller) – while she and her then-boyfriend Craig were watching television together when he visited her in Vancouver, during the production of White Chicks. Seth Rogen has also said that he and his writing partner Evan Goldberg wrote a draft of the screenplay that included some of the "biggest jokes" featured in the finished film, but they were ultimately fired and did not receive any credit.

All of the scenes at the National Figure Skating Championships and World Wintersport Games were shot at the Los Angeles Memorial Sports Arena. The stadium used for the outside shoots is the Montreal Olympic Stadium, built for the 1976 Olympics. The outdoor chase scenes were also shot on-location in Montreal. The building used for athlete housing in Montreal was the unique Habitat 67, built for Expo 67. The film was delayed for a small undetermined period of time when Jon Heder broke his ankle while doing a skating program for the film.

During an interview, Will Ferrell remarked on how he enjoyed playing a character against his usual type. He said, "I thought that character was great too. That would have been fun. I do have to say that to get to play the not innocent guy who is overly macho and has been so cocksure all the time was really fun." Craig Cox said that Will Ferrell came up with the name "Chazz Michael Michaels", as the original script listed the character as "Chazz Lewis".

== Reception ==
=== Box office ===
Blades of Glory grossed $118.2 million in the U.S. and Canada and $26.3 million in other territories, for a total of $145.7 million.

The film grossed $33 million in its opening weekend from 3,372 theaters, averaging $9,790 per screen, topping fellow new release Meet the Robinsons to finish in first. It made $22.5 million in its second weekend, dropping just 32.1% and remaining in first. It then made $13.8 million in its third weekend and $7.7 million in its fourth, finishing in second and third place, respectively.

=== Critical response ===
Review aggregation website Rotten Tomatoes gave the film an approval rating of 70% based on 188 reviews, with an average rating of 6.3/10. The site's critical consensus reads, "Thanks to the spirited performances of a talented cast – particularly Will Ferrell and Jon Heder as rivals-turned-teammates – Blades of Glory successfully spoofs inspirational sports dramas with inspired abandon." On Metacritic, the film has a weighted average score of 64 out of 100, based on 35 critics, indicating "generally favorable" reviews. Audiences polled by CinemaScore gave the film an average grade of "B" on an A+ to F scale.

The Monthly critic Luke Davies accepted the film as a fun romp, comparing it to Will Ferrell's previous movies Anchorman: The Legend of Ron Burgundy and Talladega Nights: The Ballad of Ricky Bobby, and wrote positively of Ferrell's performance, describing that "there is a parodic exhilaration to everything Ferrell does; there's always the sense that any scene is precariously close to being a blooper reel." However, Davies conceded that, like the other two films, the plot was "formulaic ... [with] an obviousness to the set-ups, a no-nonsense compression, a sometimes clunky transition from one sequence to the next" but that it was the film's ability to "venture to fantastically absurd places – to set aside the rapid and hokey forward movement – and there to idle in neutral, in zones of pure comic exploration" and offer "moments of expansive hilarity ... that made the films worthwhile."

== Home media ==
Blades of Glory was released on DVD and HD DVD on August 28, 2007, and was released on Blu-ray Disc on May 20, 2008, by DreamWorks Home Entertainment.
