= Drake Sather =

American screenwriter (1959–2004)

- Born: May 24, 1959; Seattle, Washington, U.S.
- Died: March 3, 2004 (aged 44); Los Angeles, California, U.S.
- Resting place: Forest Lawn Memorial Park, Glendale
- Occupations: Screenwriter, producer
- Spouses: Krystal Sather (m. 1989–1990) Marnie Sather (m. 1991)
- Children: 4

Drake Sather (May 24, 1959 – March 3, 2004) was an American stand-up comedian, television writer, and producer best known for co-creating the character Derek Zoolander with Ben Stiller and co-writing the first Zoolander film with Stiller and John Hamburg. Sather also wrote for several TV shows, most notably seasons 2 through 5 of NewsRadio, where he also served as a producer. Sather also wrote for The Larry Sanders Show, Saturday Night Live, The Dennis Miller Show, Ed, Gary & Mike, and co-created the NBC adult animated series Sammy with David Spade as a vehicle for Spade.

== Biography ==
Sather was born in Seattle, Washington, on May 24, 1959.

In 1994, Sather was nominated for an Emmy Award for his work on The Larry Sanders Show. Sather wrote for Saturday Night Live during the 1994–1995 season, and created the character Derek Zoolander for a short film shown during the 1996 VH1 Fashion Awards. His last credit was an unsold pilot of a television remake of Mr. Ed, for which he also served as an executive producer.

Sather was married to Krystal Ginger Hendricks from 1989 to 1990. He and Krystal had one child, Rudy. On July 4, 1991, he married Marnie Stroud, to whom he remained married until his death. They had three children: Dallas, Tristan, and Molly.

At the time of his death, Sather and his wife were going through couples therapy; he had expressed frustration at his home life along with his current work (the aforementioned Mr. Ed). On March 3, 2004, after leaving a heated therapy session early, Sather called his wife and died by suicide using a firearm.

== Filmography ==
=== Film ===
Year	Title	Writer	Notes
2001	Zoolander	Yes	
2016	Zoolander 2	Yes	Based on characters created by, Dedicated to

=== Television ===
==== Series ====
Year	Title	Creator	Writer	Producer	Notes
1992	The Dennis Miller Show	No	Yes	No	
1993–1994	The Larry Sanders Show	No	Yes	No	
1994	Empty Nest	No	Yes	No	
1994–1995	Saturday Night Live	No	Yes	No	
1995–1999	NewsRadio	No	Yes	Yes	Also did voiceover as Mr. James's Lawyer (2 episodes)
1996	The Naked Truth	No	Yes	No	
1996	Saturday Night Special	No	Yes	No	
2000	Sammy	Yes	Yes	Yes	
2001	Gary & Mike	No	Yes	Yes	
2002–2003	Ed	No	Yes	Yes	
2004	Mr. Ed	Yes	Yes	Yes	Fox reboot of Mister Ed, Developed by

==== Standup Appearances ====
Year	Title	Notes
1986–1987	Late Night with David Letterman	3 episodes
1988	Star Search	
1988-1990	An Evening at the Improv	2 episodes
1989	The 13th Annual Young Comedians Special	
1991	Comics Only with Paul Provenza	
1991	London Underground	

==== Awards Shows ====
Year	Title	Writer	Notes
1993	The 45th Primetime Emmy Awards	Yes	
1994	The 66th Academy Awards	Yes	Special material
1994	The 46th Primetime Emmy Awards	Yes	
1995	1995 MTV Movie Awards	Yes	
1996	1996 VH1 Fashion Awards	Yes	Co-wrote the short "Derek Zoolander: Male Model" with Ben Stiller
1997	1997 VH1 Fashion Awards	Yes	Co-wrote the short "Derek Zoolander University" with Ben Stiller
1997	1997 MTV Movie Awards	Yes	
