= Alan Riche =

American film producer

- Born: November 1, 1941 (age 84); Buffalo, New York, U.S.
- Occupation: Film producer
- Years active: 1974–present
- Spouse: Wendy Riche (m. 1966)
- Children: 2

Alan Riche (born November 1, 1941) is an American film producer.

== Early life ==
Riche was born in Buffalo, New York, on November 1, 1941.

== Career ==
Riche worked as a talent agent before moving into film production. He co-founded the production company Riche/Ludwig with producer Tony Ludwig, then established his own company Riche Productions.

== Personal life ==
Riche and his wife Wendy married on December 4, 1966. They have two sons, Tim and Peter, the latter of whom also became a film producer.

== Filmography ==
Year	Title	Role
1974	Messiah of Evil	Executive producer
1978	Youngblood	Producer
1989	Bill & Ted's Excellent Adventure	Thanks
1995	Empire Records	Producer
1997	Mouse Hunt	Producer
1999	The Mod Squad	Producer
1999	Komodo	Producer
1999	Deep Blue Sea	Producer
2000	Duets	Executive producer
2000	The Family Man	Producer
2001	Tomcats	Producer
2004	Starsky & Hutch	Producer
2009	Bride Wars	Producer
2015	Southpaw	Producer
2016	The Legend of Tarzan	Producer
2019	Bodies at Rest	Executive producer
