= John Lesher (producer) =

American film producer

- Born: May 12, 1966 (age 60); Pittsburgh, Pennsylvania, U.S.
- Occupation: Film producer
- Years active: 2012–present
- Spouse: Christina Liao

John Huttner Lesher (born May 12, 1966) is an American film producer, best known for winning the Academy Award for Best Picture for the 2014 film Birdman.

== Life and career ==
John Lesher was born on May 12, 1966, in Pittsburgh, Pennsylvania. He graduated from Harvard University in 1988 before starting his career as an agent at the Bauer-Benedek Agency.

Later, Lesher moved to the United Talent Agency (UTA), where he became a partner. After 15 years at UTA, Lesher left for Endeavor, where his clients included Martin Scorsese, Paul Thomas Anderson, Alejandro Iñárritu, and Judd Apatow. In 2005, he was made head of Paramount Vantage, a brand derived from Paramount Classics that produced and distributed arthouse-oriented titles. The company produced such Oscar-winning pictures as Inarritu's Babel (2006), the Coen Brothers' No Country for Old Men (2007), and Paul Thomas Anderson's There Will Be Blood (2007). The success of these films led to Lesher's appointment in 2008 as President of Paramount Pictures, where he oversaw several major features, including J.J. Abrams' reboot of the Star Trek (2008) franchise and David Fincher's The Curious Case of Benjamin Button (2008). "Star Trek" was his only blockbuster. Other titles released by Paramount during his tenure, like Iron Man (2008), were distribution titles made at other companies, while other projects, like the Mike Myers comedy Love Guru (2008) and Imagine That (2009) were failures. Lesher was dismissed as Paramount president in the summer of 2009. He formed his own production company, Le Grisbi, which released several box office hits between 2012 and 2014.

Among their most popular efforts was Birdman, which was directed by Inarritu and earned Lesher an Oscar for Best Picture in 2015.

Lesher, along with his fellow producers also won the Darryl F. Zanuck Award for Outstanding Producer of Theatrical Motion Pictures at the 26th Producers Guild of America Awards.

== Filmography ==
Year	Title	Notes
2012	End of Watch	
2013	Blood Ties	
2014	Fury	
2014	Birdman	Won Academy Award for Best Picture
2015	Mississippi Grind	
2015	Mediterranea	
2015	Black Mass	
2017	Hostiles	
2018	White Boy Rick	
2019	The Beach Bum	
2021	Mona Lisa and the Blood Moon	
2021	The Premise	Anthology TV series
2022	Tokyo Vice	TV series
2022	The Pale Blue Eye	
2023	Ferrari	
2024	Severance	TV Series
2026	Born to Bowl	Documentary TV series
2026	The Dink	Post-production
