= John Hamburg =

American screenwriter and director

- Hamburg in 2026
- Born: John Liman Hamberg; May 26, 1970 (age 56); Manhattan, New York, U.S.
- Occupations: Film director, screenwriter, film producer
- Spouse: Christina Kirk (m. 2005)

John Liman Hamburg (born May 26, 1970) is an American screenwriter, film director and producer.

== Career ==
After screening his 1996 short film Tick at the Sundance Film Festival, Hamburg wrote and directed the 1998 film Safe Men. Hamburg then found greater success co-writing Meet the Parents and Zoolander, and returned to the director's chair with Along Came Polly, which he also wrote. He also co-wrote the sequel Meet the Fockers. In 2009, Hamburg wrote and directed the hit comedy I Love You, Man. He wrote the second sequel to Meet the Parents, entitled Little Fockers.

In 2016, Hamburg co-wrote the sequel Zoolander 2, which grossed $56 million at the box office compared to a $50 million budget, and directed and co-wrote the comedy Why Him? for 20th Century Fox. In 2022, he wrote and directed the Netflix film Me Time starring Kevin Hart and Mark Wahlberg.

== Personal life ==
Hamburg was born to a Jewish family in Manhattan, the son of New York City radio personality Joan Hamburg and Morton I. Hamburg. He graduated from Brown University in 1992 with a degree in history. He then attended the Tisch School of the Arts at New York University. Hamburg is married to actress Christina Kirk.

== Filmography ==
=== Film ===
Year	Title	Director	Producer	Writer	Notes
1996	Tick	Yes	No	Yes	Short film
1998	Safe Men	Yes	No	Yes	
2000	Meet the Parents	No	No	Yes	
2001	Zoolander	No	No	Yes	
2004	Meet the Fockers	No	No	Yes	
2004	Along Came Polly	Yes	No	Yes	
2009	I Love You, Man	Yes	Yes	Yes	
2010	Little Fockers	No	Yes	Yes	Nominated - Golden Raspberry Award for Worst Screenplay
2015	Drunk Wedding	No	Executive	No	
2016	Zoolander 2	No	No	Yes	
2016	Why Him?	Yes	Executive	Yes	
2018	Night School	No	No	Yes	
2022	Me Time	Yes	Yes	Yes	
2026	Focker-in-Law	Yes	Yes	Yes	Post-production

Acting roles

Year	Title	Role
1998	Safe Men	Philip
2003	Duplex	Mr. Friedman

=== Television ===
Year	Title	Director	Executive Producer	Notes
2001–2003	Undeclared	Yes	No	3 episodes
2005	Stella	Yes	No	2 episodes
2008	Welcome to the Captain	Yes	Yes	Directed 3 episodes
2011	New Girl	Yes	No	Episode "Cece Crashes"
2015	The Grinder	Yes	No	Episode "Little Mitchard No More"
2015	Good Session	Yes	Yes	TV movie
2019–2021	The Unicorn	Yes	Yes	Directed 4 episodes
2025	Stick	Yes	No	1 episode
