= NYAV Post =

American recording studio

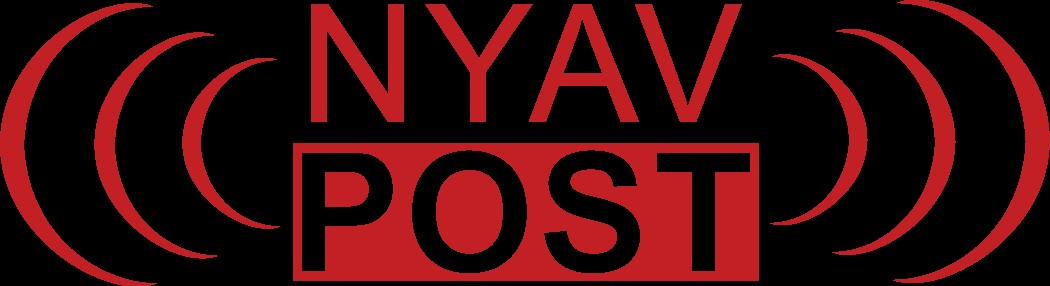
- Type: Private
- Industry: ADR Production, dubbing (bi-coastal), commercial production and services
- Founded: 2000
- Headquarters: New York City, New York; Los Angeles, California
- Key people: Michael Sinterniklaas (founder)
- Website: http://www.nyavpost.net

NYAV Post is an American recording studio located in New York City. It was founded by Michael Sinterniklaas in 2000, with a West Coast branch located in Los Angeles, California.

The studio is prolific in recording anime dubs, original animation, commercials, and feature films, notably for Central Park Media, Media Blasters, The Right Stuf International, Anime Limited, Bandai Visual, Funimation, Sentai Filmworks, World Leaders Entertainment, 4Kids Entertainment, GKIDS and Viz Media.

Notable projects include Berserk, Huntik: Secrets & Seekers, Kappa Mikey, Kurokami: The Animation, Magic User's Club, Mobile Suit Gundam Unicorn, Ninja Nonsense, Ah! My Goddess, Slayers Revolution, Slayers Evolution-R, Tamagotchi!, Three Delivery and The Venture Bros.

== Production list ==
=== Animation ===
- DC Super Friends
- Ellen's Acres
- Hanazuki: Full of Treasures
- Huntik: Secrets & Seekers
- Kappa Mikey
- Lastman
- Lego Monkie Kid
- Mao Mao: Heroes of Pure Heart
- Peter Rabbit (Season 1)
- Robotomy
- Royal Crackers
- Supernormal
- Speed Racer: The Next Generation
- Three Delivery
- The Venture Bros.

=== Anime ===
- Ah! My Goddess (Season 1: Media Blasters, Season 2: ADV Films)
- Bakuman (Media Blasters)
- Berserk (TV Series: Media Blasters, Movies: Viz Media)
- Cannon Busters (Netflix)
- Children of Ether (LeSean Thomas/Crunchyroll)
- Code Geass: Rozé of the Recapture (Disney)
- Demon Fighter Kocho (Media Blasters)
- Domain of Murder (Central Park Media)
- Dropout Idol Fruit Tart (Funimation)
- Fena: Pirate Princess (Adult Swim/Production I.G)
- FLCL Alternative (Production I.G)
- FLCL Progressive (Production I.G)
- Freedom (Bandai Entertainment)
- GaoGaiGar: The King of Braves (Media Blasters)
- Giant Robo: The Animation (Media Blasters)
- Gokusen (Media Blasters)
- Great Pretender (Wit Studio/Netflix)
- Knight Hunters (Media Blasters)
- Kurokami: The Animation (Bandai Entertainment)
- LBX Girls (Funimation)
- Maesetsu! (Funimation)
- Magic User's Club (Media Blasters)
- Midori Days (Media Blasters)
- Mobile Suit Gundam GQuuuuuuX (Bandai Namco Filmworks/Amazon Prime Video)
- Mobile Suit Gundam: The Origin (Sunrise)
- Mobile Suit Gundam SEED (Sunrise)
- Mobile Suit Gundam SEED Destiny (Sunrise)
- Mobile Suit Gundam Unicorn (Bandai Visual/Sunrise)
- Mobile Suit Gundam Thunderbolt (Sunrise)
- Ninja Nonsense (Right Stuf International)
- number24 (Funimation)
- Phoenix (Media Blasters)
- Piano (Right Stuf International)
- Queen's Blade: Beautiful Warriors (Sentai Filmworks)
- Queen's Blade Rebellion (Sentai Filmworks)
- Sadamitsu the Destroyer (Media Blasters)
- Samurai Deeper Kyo (Media Blasters)
- Scar on the Praeter (Funimation)
- Seven of Seven (Media Blasters)
- Shrine of the Morning Mist (Media Blasters)
- Shura no Toki: Age of Chaos (Media Blasters)
- Slayers (Seasons 4-5: Funimation)
- Space Pirate Mito (Media Blasters)
- Talentless Nana (Funimation)
- Tamagotchi! (Bandai Visual)
- Twin Signal (Media Blasters)
- Vampire in the Garden (Wit Studio/Netflix)
- Yasuke (Netflix)
- Zetman (Viz Media)

=== Films ===
==== Animation ====
- A Cat in Paris
- Birdboy: The Forgotten Children
- Ernest & Celestine
- Green Snake
- Mia and the Migoo
- Monkey King: Hero Is Back
- My Life as a Zucchini
- Phantom Boy
- The Painting
- The Snow Queen 3: Fire and Ice
- White Snake
- Wrinkles
- Zarafa

==== Anime ====
- 009 Re:Cyborg (Anime Limited/Funimation)
- A Silent Voice (Anime Limited/Eleven Arts)
- A Letter to Momo (GKIDS)
- Belle (GKIDS)
- The Boy and the Heron (GKIDS)
- Children of the Sea (GKIDS)
- Dragon Quest: Your Story (Netflix)
- Fireworks (GKIDS)
- Jungle Emperor Leo (Media Blasters)
- Lu Over the Wall (GKIDS)
- Lupin III: The First (GKIDS)
- Mai Mai Miracle (Anime Limited)
- Maquia: When the Promised Flower Blooms (Anime Limited/Eleven Arts)
- Mazinger Z: Infinity (Viz Media)
- Memories (Magnetic Rose segment) (Discotek Media)
- Mirai (GKIDS)
- Miss Hokusai (GKIDS)
- Mobile Suit Gundam: Hathaway's Flash (Sunrise)
- Mobile Suit Gundam Narrative (Sunrise)
- Napping Princess (Anime Limited/GKIDS)
- Negadon: The Monster from Mars (Central Park Media)
- Patema Inverted (GKIDS)
- Pompo: The Cinéphile (GKIDS)
- Promare (GKIDS)
- Psychic School Wars (Anime Limited/Funimation)
- Ride Your Wave (GKIDS)
- Time of Eve (Pied Piper Inc.)
- The Weathering Continent (Media Blasters)
- Weathering with You (GKIDS)
- Welcome to the Space Show (GKIDS)
- Your Name (Anime Limited/Funimation)

=== Live-action dubbing ===
- Cutey Honey (Bandai Entertainment)
- Dead Snow (IFC Films)
- Kingdom (Netflix)
- Moon Over Tao (Media Blasters)
- The Machine Girl (Media Blasters)
- Reality Z (Netflix)

=== Video games ===
- Captain America: Super Soldier (Sega)
- Dance Dance Revolution Ultramix 4 (Konami)
- Dance Dance Revolution Universe (Konami)
- Dishonored (Bethesda Softworks)
- Fallout: New Vegas (Bethesda Softworks)
- Iron Chef America: Supreme Cuisine (Destineer)
- Just Cause 3 (Square Enix)
- Ratchet & Clank (Sony Interactive)
- Saint's Row: The Third (THQ)
- Shira Oka: Second Chances (Okashi Studios)
- The Elder Scrolls V: Skyrim (Bethesda Softworks)
- The Evil Within (Bethesda Softworks)
