= Michael Sinterniklaas =

French voice actor

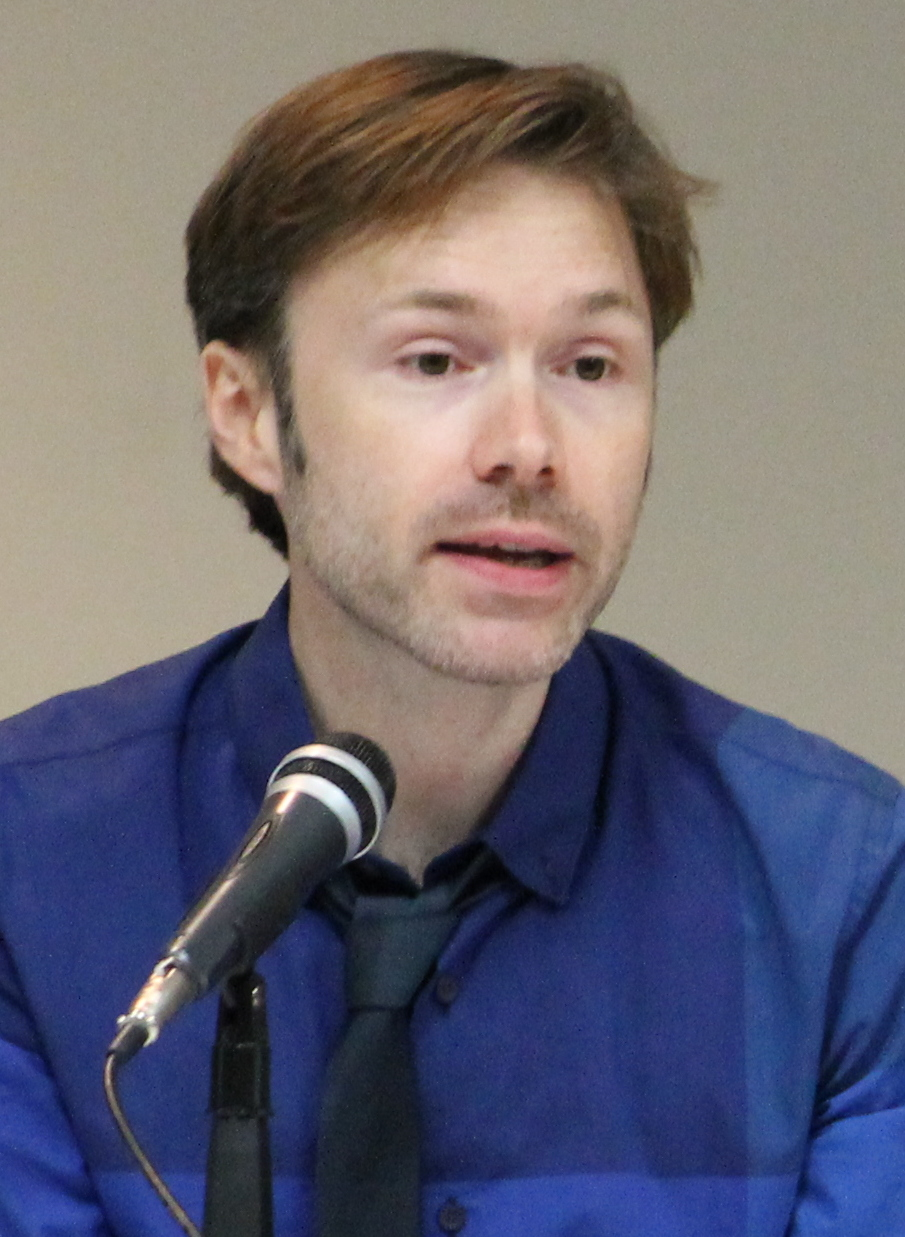
- Sinterniklaas at Florida Supercon in 2015
- Born: Michael Tremain Sinterniklaas; Nice, France
- Occupations: Voice actor; ADR director; script writer
- Years active: 1994–present

Michael Tremain Sinterniklaas (/sɪntərnɪkləs/) is a French voice actor and ADR director. He has provided voices for a number of English-language versions of Japanese anime films and television series, as well as cartoons and video games. He is the founder and owner of NYAV Post, a studio with facilities in New York City and Los Angeles, which has dubbed many different anime titles and recorded several original works of prelay.

He is best known for his roles as Leonardo in the 2003 series of Teenage Mutant Ninja Turtles, Dean Venture in The Venture Bros. and Taki Tachibana in the English dub of Your Name.

== Early life ==
Michael Tremain Sinterniklaas lived in London and Lucerne as a child, and moved to the United States when he was 10 years old. He graduated from the High School of Performing Arts in New York City, and attended college in North Carolina, where he did work at both Southwynde and Coastal Carolina Studios.

== Career ==
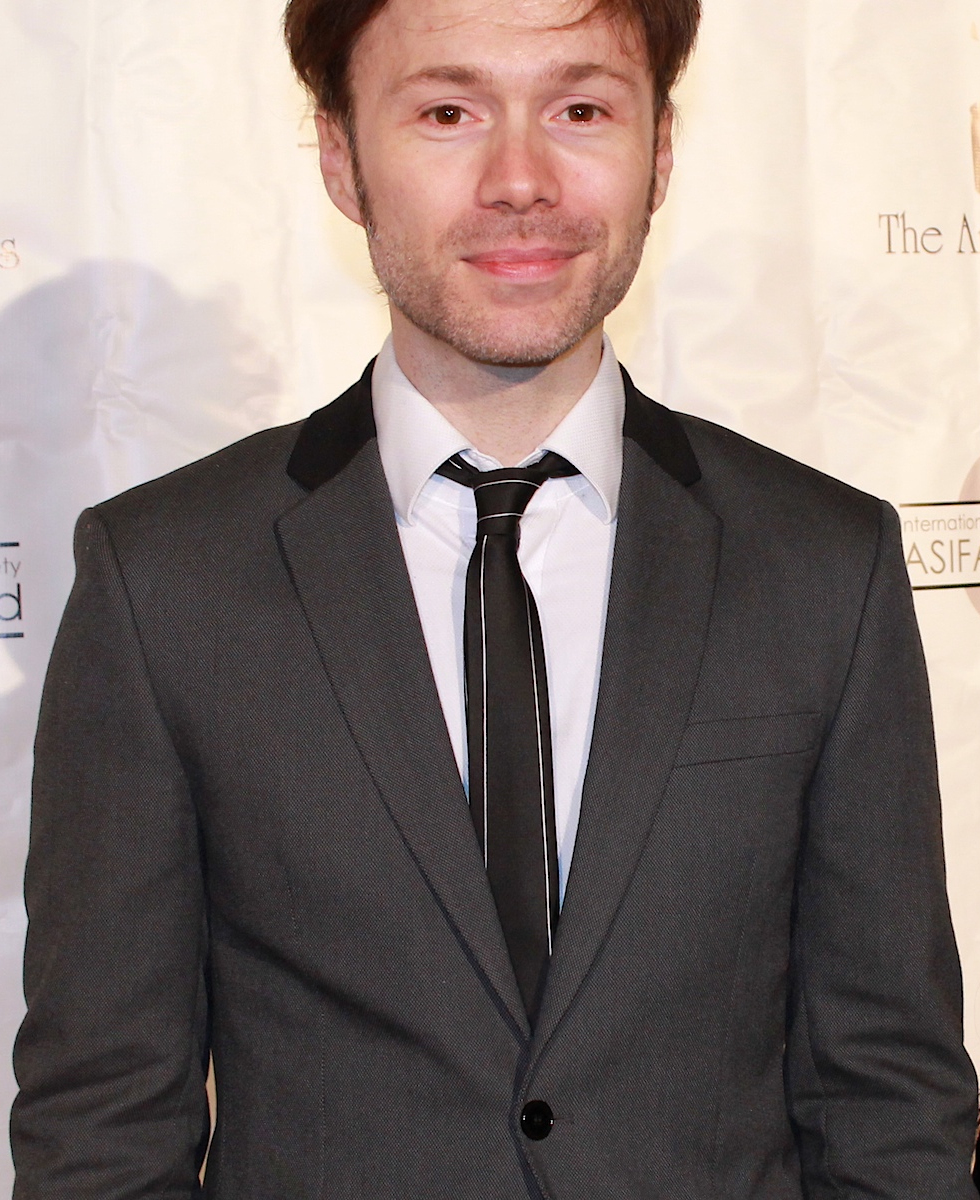
Sinterniklaas at the 2014 Annie Awards

His most notable roles as a voice actor are Leonardo in 2003 series of Teenage Mutant Ninja Turtles, Dean Venture (and other small parts) in the Adult Swim cartoon The Venture Bros, Mikey Simon in the Nicktoons series Kappa Mikey, Orphan in Final Fantasy XIII and as Deady in the 2011 Friday the 13th event of the online MMORPG AdventureQuest Worlds. He also replaced David Moo as Xellos in the English dubs of Slayers, Revolution and Evolution-R, and Nathaniel Kurtzburg in Miraculous: Tales of Ladybug & Cat Noir.

He is also a well known voice director, for a variety of shows, such as Berserk, Huntik: Secrets & Seekers, Kappa Mikey, Kurokami: The Animation, Magic User's Club, Mobile Suit Gundam Unicorn, Samurai Deeper Kyo, Slayers Revolution, Slayers Evolution-R, Let's Go! Tamagotchi, Three Delivery, Care Bears and The Venture Bros.

== Dubbing roles ==
=== Anime ===
- A Silent Voice - Kazuki Shimada
- Alien Nine – Hiroshi Iwanami
- B-Daman CrossFire – Yuki Washimura (credited as Martel Fraiser Tremain)
- Bakuman – Moritaka Mashiro
- Black Butler: Book of Circus – Dagger
- Bleach – Nnoitora Gilga, Luppi Antenor, Menis, Ikkaku Madarame (Ep. 105), Wonderweiss Mergera (Eps. 278+)
- Burst Angel – Jei Kokuren (Ep. 9)
- Bubblegum Crisis – Mackie Stingray (Young), AD Police Officer
- Cannon Busters - Additional voices
- Detective Conan – Keenan Morris (Ep. 6)
- Cyborg 009 VS Devilman – Cyborg 004/Albert Heinrich
- D.Gray-Man – Dodge (Ep. 18)
- Di Gi Charat – Ky Schweitzer
- Digimon Fusion – Lucemon (Ep. 15–17)
- Dinosaur King – David Neckam, additional voices
- Domain of Murder – Goro Nagase
- Eden of the East – Satoshi Osugi
- Eden of the East: The King of Eden – Satoshi Osugi
- Eden of the East: Paradise Lost – Satoshi Osugi
- Fairy Tail: Dragon Cry – King Animus
- Freedom Project – Takeru
- Fullmetal Alchemist – Leo
- Future Diary – Assemblyman (ep. 19), additional voices
- Gall Force: New Era – Nova Universe
- Glass Fleet – Subordinate (Eps. 24 & 26)
- Go! Go! Loser Ranger! – Green Keeper
- Gokusen – Ichikawa, Ishizuka, Sonomura, Tanaka
- Hades Project Zeorymer – Saiga
- Hetalia: Axis Powers – Netherlands
- Hetalia: The Beautiful World – Netherlands
- Hetalia: The World Twinkle – Netherlands (Ep. 17)
- Hetalia: World Series – Netherlands
- Hi no Tori – Masato (The Future Chapter)
- Ichi the Killer – Ichi
- Joe vs. Joe – Joe Yuuki
- Jormungand – Gasud (Ep. 5)
- Jormungand: Perfect Order – Gasud (Ep. 4)
- Kakurenbo – Hikora
- Kizuna: Bonds of Love – Kai Sagano
- Kekkaishi – Shu Akitsu, Yukimasa
- Knight Hunters: Weiß Kreuz – Brad Crawford
- Kotaro Lives Alone - Shin Karino
- Kurokami: The Animation – Punipuni, Pilot, The Noble One (Ep. 14), Tribal End
- Let's Go Tamagotchi – Gozanutchi
- Lu Over the Wall - Kai
- Lupin the 3rd Part IV: The Italian Adventure - Koh Uraga, Mario (Ep. 15)
- Magic User's Club – Yoshito Yoshimoto
- Magical DoReMi – Stewart, Mackenzie
- Marvel Anime: Blade – Tanaka (Eps. 1 & 2), Vampire Guard (Ep. 1)
- Marvel Anime: Iron Man – Lab Employee (Ep. 6), Operator (Ep. 8), Pisces/Sho (Ep. 6)
- Marvel Anime: X-Men – Hisako's Father, Ray, Mr. Ichiki, Rat
- Marvel Future Avengers – Maximus, Triton
- Memories – Carlo, Guest B (segment: Magnetic Rose)
- Mobile Suit Gundam Unicorn – Angelo Sauper, Dennis (Ep. 1), Besson, additional voices
- Monster – Detective Jan Suk
- Mr. Osomatsu – Jyushimatsu Matsuno
- Munto – Kazuya
- Mushishi – Isaza (Ep. 26)
- Naruto Shippuden – Sora, Utakata (Six Tails Jinchūriki), Reincarnated Ninja (Ep. 316), Villager (Ep. 150)
- Ninja Nonsense – Takeru
- Nippon Sangoku – Fuji III
- One Piece – Disco, Additional Voices (FUNimation dub)
- Patema Inverted – Age
- Patlabor: The Mobile Police - The TV Series – Utsumi
- Piano: The Melody of a Young Girl's Heart – Kazuya Takahashi
- Pluto – Professor Hoffman
- Pokémon - Joshua, Seviper, Additional Voices (seasons 5–8)
- Samurai 7 – Sobei
- Samurai Deeper Kyo – Akira, The Two Headed Dragon
- Sengoku Basara: End of Judgement – Sarutobi Sasuke
- Sengoku Basara: Samurai Kings – Sarutobi Sasuke
- Sengoku Basara: Samurai Kings II – Sarutobi Sasuke
- Sengoku Basara: The Last Party – Sarutobi Sasuke
- Shaman King – Trey "Horohoro" Racer, Orona
- Shin-chan (FUNimation dub) – Phillippe, The Flying Pecker
- Shootfighter Tekken – Kiichi "Keybo" Miyazawa
- Slayers – Xellos (Seasons 4 & 5)
- Sonic X - Christopher Thorndyke (adult) (Season 2 & 3)
- Space Dandy – Defense lawyer (Ep. 25)
- Star Wars: Visions – Hen Jin
- Stitch! – Hans (Season 2)
- Summer Wars – Kenji Koiso
- Tiger & Bunny – Ivan Karelin/Origami Cyclone
- Time of Eve – Masakazu Masaki
- The Galaxy Railways – Filidh (Ep. 17), Owen
- The King of Braves GaoGaiGar – Guy Shishio
- The Sky Crawlers – Yuichi Kannami
- The Weathering Continent – Arun Harad
- Urusei Yatsura – Ataru Moroboshi
- Weathering with You - Taki Tachibana (cameo)
- Welcome to the Space Show – Kyoshi Sato
- Winx Club (4Kids dub) – Riven
- Your Lie in April – Akira Takayanagi
- Your Name – Taki Tachibana
- Zetman – Man (Ep. 1)

=== TV series ===
- Violetta - Leon Vargas (Seasons 2 and 3)

== Filmography ==
=== Animation ===
- Care Bears: Welcome to Care-a-Lot – Bedtime Bear, Birthday Bear, Funshine Bear
- Chaotic – Additional voices
- Ernest & Celestine – Additional voices
- Friends of Heartlake City
- G.I. Joe: Sigma Six – Tunnel Rat, Kamakura
- Hanazuki – Orange Hemka, Pink Hemka, Dark Purple Hemka, Lavender Hemka, Light Blue Hemka, Dark Green Hemka, various voices
- Huntik: Secrets & Seekers – Peter
- Impy's Island – Professor Horatio Tibberton
- Kappa Mikey – Mikey Simon
- Lego Monkie Kid – Goldfish Demon, Ao Lie
- Mad – Leonardo, Steven Spielberg, Aquaman, Ethan Hunt
- Miraculous Ladybug – Nathaniel Kurtzberg/Caprikid
- OK K.O.! Let's Be Heroes – Hero, Frank Bank
- Robotomy – Weenus, Megawatt
- Speed Racer: The Next Generation – Jared, Jesse
- Supernormal – Eric Normal/Captain Scrumptious
- Teenage Mutant Ninja Turtles – Leonardo, Dark Leo, Parker, Lord Hebi, Graviturtle, Weasel
- The Venture Bros. – Dean Venture, various voices
- Turtles Forever – 2003 Leonardo
- Pickle and Peanut - Additional Voices

=== Video games ===
- Adventure Quest Worlds – Deady
- Armored Core VI: Fires of Rubicon – Additional voices
- Bravely Second: End Layer – Yew
- Dragon Ball Xenoverse 2 – Time Patroller
- Final Fantasy XIII – Orphan
- Final Fantasy XIII-2 – Additional voices
- Fire Emblem Heroes – Takumi, Niles, Lucius
- Grand Theft Auto V – The Local Population
- Naruto Shippuden: Ultimate Ninja Storm 3 – Utakata
- Naruto Shippuden: Ultimate Ninja Storm 4 – Utakata
- Naruto Shippuden: Ultimate Ninja Storm Revolution – Utakata
- ObsCure – Kenny Matthews (uncredited)
- Persona 3 Reload – Mr. Takenozuka
- Pillars of Eternity – Additional voices
- Rune Factory 4 Special – Vishnal
- Saint's Row: The Third – Radio voices
- Shira Oka: Second Chances – Kazuki Ogawa
- Sengoku Basara: Samurai Heroes – Sarutobi Sasuke
- Shaman King: Power of Spirit – Trey Racer (Horohoro), Clive Portman
- Shaman King: Master of Spirits – Trey Racer (Horohoro)
- Shaman King: Master of Spirits 2 – Trey Racer (Horohoro)
- The Bureau: XCOM Declassified – Lawrence
- The Last of Us – Additional voices
- The Legend of Heroes: Trails into Reverie – Crossbell Guardian Force, S P
- The Lego Movie Videogame – Additional voices
- The Pink Panther: Passport to Peril – Pink Panther, Louie, Kumoken, Yung-Li, Nigel, Additional voices
- The Pink Panther: Hokus Pokus Pink – Pink Panther
- The Vanishing of Ethan Carter – Dale Carter
- Tom Clancy's Rainbow Six: Siege – Jäger
- Teenage Mutant Ninja Turtles series – Leonardo, Leatherhead, Utrominator
- Xenoblade Chronicles X – Gwin Ewans

=== Live-action ===
- Answer This! – Umlatt the Flunkie
- Cutie Honey – Detective Todoroki (English voice-over)
- Flesh for the Beast – Martin Shelley
- Matlock – Pizza Guy
- Once a Loser – Cam Dean
- The Crow – Extra (uncredited)
- Violetta – Braco (English dub) / Leon (Seasons 2-3) (English dub)
- Zero Woman: The Accused – Mitsuru (English dub)
- Rurouni Kenshin: Kyoto Inferno — Cho Sawagejo (English dub)

=== Documentary ===
- Adventures in Voice Acting – Himself

== Production staff ==
=== Voice direction ===
- 009 Re:Cyborg (co-directed with Anthony Tortorici)
- A Cat in Paris (co-directed with Stephanie Sheh)
- A.D. Police Files
- Ah! My Goddess
- Ancien and the Magic Tablet (co-directed with Stephanie Sheh)
- Berserk
- The Boy and the Heron (Voice director English version)
- Cannon Busters (co-directed with Stephanie Sheh)
- DC Super Friends
- Freedom (co-directed with Carrie Keranen and Stephanie Sheh)
- King of Braves GaoGaiGar
- Giant Robo: The Animation
- Huntik: Secrets & Seekers – Voice director (with Marc Diraison (season 1) and Stephanie Sheh)
- Jungle Emperor Leo
- Kurokami: The Animation (co-directed with Marc Diraison)
- Magic User's Club
- Mao Mao: Heroes of Pure Heart
- Memories (segment: Magnetic Rose)
- Mia and the Migoo
- Mobile Suit Gundam Unicorn (co-directed with Marc Diraison, Dan Green, Stephanie Sheh and Kathleen McInerney)
- Ninja Nonsense
- Peter Rabbit
- Piano: The Melody of a Young Girl's Heart
- Phoenix
- Promare (co-directed with Michael Schneider and Stephanie Sheh)
- Robotomy (also worked as a casting director)
- Samurai Deeper Kyo
- Slayers Revolution (co-directed with Marc Diraison)
- Slayers Evolution-R (co-directed with Marc Diraison)
- Twin Signal
- Let's Go! Tamagotchi! (co-directed with Marc Diraison)
- The Midnight Gospel
- The Weathering Continent
- Three Delivery (co-directed with Marc Diraison)
- The Venture Bros.
- Weathering with You (co-directed with Stephanie Sheh)

=== Script adaptation ===
- Berserk
- Bubblegum Crisis
- Cutie Honey
- Freedom (co-written with Stephanie Sheh, Jay Snyder and Marc Handler)
- Giant Robo: The Animation (co-written with Stephanie Sheh and Jay Snyder)
- Phoenix (co-written with Stephanie Sheh and Jay Snyder)
- Magic User's Club
- Mobile Suit Gundam Unicorn (co-written with Stephanie Sheh and Dan Green)
- Twin Signal

=== Sound department ===
- A.D. Police Files (audio engineer, dialogue editing)
- Ah! My Goddess (audio mixing)
- Battle Royal High School (audio engineer, dialogue editing, mixing, sound design)
- Berserk (mixing)
- Berserk: The Golden Age Arc (recording engineer, re-recording mixing, post-production supervisor)
- Bubblegum Crash (dialogue editing)
- Bubblegum Crisis (dialogue editing)
- Demon Fighter Kocho (audio mixing)
- Cutie Honey (mixing)
- Domain of Murder (recording engineer)
- Freedom Project (ADR recording engineer)
- Giant Robo: The Animation (mixing)
- Jungle Emperor Leo (mixing)
- Kurokami the Animation (mixing)
- Magic User's Club (mixing)
- Mia and the Migoo (recording engineer, sound design, mixing)
- Memories (recording engineer)
- Negadon: The Monster from Mars (mixing)
- Sadamitsu the Destroyer (audio engineer, mixing)
- Samurai Deeper Kyo (audio engineer, mixing)
- Seven of Seven (mixing)
- Shura no Toki: Age of Chaos (mix engineer)
- Supernormal (sound engineer, mix engineer)
- Twin Signal (mixing)
- The Weathering Continent (mixing)
- Weiß Kreuz (mixing)
- Welcome to the Space Show (mixing)
- Zetman (re-recording mixing)

=== Producer/production manager ===
- Ah! My Goddess
- Bakuman
- Berserk
- Cutie Honey
- Gokusen
- Mia and the Migoo
- Phoenix
- Slayers Revolution/Slayers Evolution-R
- Space Pirate Mito
- Time of Eve

=== Casting ===
- Mao Mao: Heroes of Pure Heart
