= Princess Natasha =

- Genre: Action; Comedy
- Created by: Larry Schwarz
- Directed by: Grant Sligh
- Creative director: Sean Lahey
- Starring: Amy Cassanova; Michael Sinterniklaas; Sean Schemmel; Wayne Grayson
- Country of origin: United States
- No. of seasons: 2
- No. of episodes: 44

Production
- Executive producer: Larry Schwarz
- Running time: 6–10 minutes
- Production company: Animation Collective

Original release
- Network: AOL Kids (online); Cartoon Network
- Release: May 9, 2003 – July 1, 2006

Princess Natasha is an American flash cartoon that was developed by Larry Schwarz for AOL Kids. The episodes were released between May 9, 2003 and July 1, 2006 and total 44 episodes overall, each running between 6 and 12 minutes apiece. The series follows the titular character of Natasha, a princess of the fictional Eastern European country of Zoravia. She must attend school in America, but without disclosing that she is a princess or a spy.

The show has been screened on Cartoon Network (United States) and ABC Kids (Australia). Along included products such as a video game adaptation through Nintendo and a line of chapter books. Episodes of Princess Natasha were released on DVD in December 5, 2006 and plans were announced to create a line of bedding products featuring the character.

== Synopsis ==
Natasha is the teen-aged princess of the fictional Eastern European country of Zoravia, which is consisted of two parts: an old side and a new side. The old side holds all of the country's landmarks while the new side is more technologically advanced. The country is ruled over by King Carl, but was previously ruled over by his older brother Lubek. Lubek had been crowned king after the death of their father, but was ousted because of the kingdom unanimously disliking and voting against him. Upset, Lubek moved outside of the country and launched a list of attacks against Zoravia from America.

In order to stop these attacks the ruling family unwillingly allows their daughter Natasha to travel to America in order to stop Lubek's plans. However, she must keep her status of royalty and as a spy secret. While in America, Natasha lives with the O'Brien family. Natasha develops a crush on their son Greg, who recently had a girlfriend named Kelly that Natasha doesn't like. She also meets Maya, a sassy, tomboyish teen that soon becomes one of Natasha's closest friends. Class life is awkward for Natasha and is made more so by her duties to the crown, as she must sneak off to combat Lubek's latest plans.

== Characters ==
- Natasha: The main character of the show, Natasha lives in America as an exchange student, but is secretly the princess of Zoravia as well as a secret agent. She is not popular at school and often felt overpowered by everything around her.
- Maya: Natasha's African-American best friend, She is tomboyish, but not a very good student.
- Oleg Boynski: He is a fellow spy and student along with Natasha, whom he gets along with.
- Mr. and Mrs. O'Brien: The O'Briens (parents of Greg and K.C.) introduce Natasha while she's residing in America.
- K.C. O'Brien: A boy that's interested in disgusted things that often annoy Natasha and his sibling Greg.
- Greg O'Brien: An attractive and popular, but narcissistic 15-year-old boy. He is Kelly's boyfriend. Natasha has a crush on him.
- Kelly: A self-absorbed, blonde-haired girl that wears too much makeup and cheats off of her fellow students. She is Greg's girlfriend and Natasha's rival.
- King Carl and Queen Lena: The rulers of Zoravia and Natasha's parents. They alert Natasha of anything that is going on in her home country.
- Lubek: The main antagonist of the show. He is King Carl's older brother and Natasha's uncle who tried to launch several attacks on Zoravia and overthrow King Carl.

== Episodes ==
=== Season 1 ===
No.	Title	Directed by	Original release date
1	"From Zoravia to Zoravia"	Grant Sligh	May 9, 2003
2	"The Bold & the Beautiful"	Grant Sligh	May 16, 2003
3	"Boynki, Oleg Boynki"	Grant Slight	

== Tie-in media ==
=== Comic book ===
A comic book adaptation of the series was released through DC Comics in 2006. The series ran for four issues and featured Natasha in various scenarios where she must fend off Lubek's attempts at control.

=== Games ===
There have been several games based upon the Princess Natasha series, many of which were flash games made available on the AOL Kids' website. A handheld game adaptation of the series was released through Nintendo on their Game Boy Advance and DS systems, entitled Princess Natasha: Student/Secret Agent/Princess.

Gameplay for the Nintendo game involved players controlling the titular character as she battles enemies and rescues citizens. IGN gave a negative review for the game, criticizing its monotonous gameplay and difficult controls. Nintendojo also gave a negative review for the game, saying that the "web is full of free flash games better than Natasha".

== Books ==
=== Chapter books ===
1. Cloning Around (2006)
2. Time Warped (2006)
3. Game Over (2006)
4. Thunderstruck (2006)
5. Can It (2006)
6. Sweet Nothings (2006)

=== Other books ===
- How to Draw Princess Natasha (2007)
