= Kappa Mikey =

2006–2008 American animated TV series

- The main cast of Kappa Mikey From left: Lily, Ozu, Mikey, Gonard (center, behind Mikey), Yes Man, Guano, and Mitsuki (woman behind Guano)
- Created by: Larry Schwarz
- Directed by: Sergei Aniskov
- Voices of: Michael Sinterniklaas; Sean Schemmel; Stephen Moverley; Kether Donohue; Gary Mack; Jesse Adams; Carrie Keranen
- Opening theme: "Hey Hey Look Look" by Beat Crusaders
- Composer: John Angier
- Country of origin: United States
- No. of seasons: 2
- No. of episodes: 52

Production
- Executive producers: Larry Schwarz; Sergei Aniskov; Sean Laher; Christopher Fauci; Michael Gold
- Producers: Joel Blanco; Tina Moglia
- Editors: William Gadea; Dave Killen
- Running time: 22 minutes
- Production companies: Animation Collective; Kanonen & Bestreichen, Inc.

Original release
- Network: Nicktoons Network (Note: Kappa Mikey was originally slated to air on Noggin's teen block The N.)
- Release: February 25, 2006 – September 20, 2008

Kappa Mikey is an American animated comedy television series created by Larry Schwarz for Nicktoons Network. Despite airing on the channel, it was not an official Nicktoon, being produced by Schwarz's production company Animation Collective. The series ran from February 25, 2006, to September 20, 2008, with repeats until November 29, 2010, across two seasons. 52 22-minute episodes were produced.

The series was announced in 2002, when it was announced that Noggin's teen block The N would be co-developing and airing the series. Animation World Network reported that Noggin/The N had signed on as a co-producer. However, the show was moved to Nicktoons Network, a sister channel to Noggin. With the move, it became the first half-hour series to premiere exclusively on Nicktoons.

== Plot ==
Intended as a parody of Japanese anime, the series follows a young American actor named Mikey Simon whose appearance is "rendered in a thick-line, pop-graphic, American cartoon style". He travels to Japan to star in a tokusatsu show called LilyMu, where his anime-influenced co-stars represent common anime clichés.

Each episode follows a specific formula. A typical episode starts with the cast filming a LilyMu segment, but the take is ruined, sometimes revealing the conflict that the characters deal with through the rest of the episode, with a minor subplot running beneath the main plot. After the problem is resolved, the LilyMu segment will be shot again and successfully completed the second time, often rewritten to incorporate whatever lesson was learned during the main story.

Deep into season 2, Kappa Mikey has stopped showing a LilyMu sequence at the end of an episode whenever it would make the episode too long, when the characters are in their LilyMu uniforms enough as it is, or when they successfully film a sequence without any mistakes before the ending.

== Characters ==
=== Main characters ===
- Michael Alexander "Mikey" Simon (voiced by Michael Sinterniklaas) is a 19-year-old American actor from Cleveland, Ohio who portrays the superhero and main lead Kappa Mikey in LilyMu. Off the set of LilyMu, he has a childish sense of humor.
- Gonard (voiced by Sean Schemmel) is LilyMu's main antagonist, a purple-skinned, blue-haired humanoid set on either domination or destruction. Off set, he is an actor who is actually a sweet-natured, if dim-witted, young man with an obsession for sandwiches.
- Mitsuki (voiced by Carrie Keranen) plays the headstrong bad girl on LilyMu. Off set, she is a sweet and caring young woman with a huge crush on Mikey.
- Lily (voiced by Kether Donohue) is an actress who portrays the damsel-in-distress role. She's also a temperamental and self-centered actress who was the original star of LilyMu before Mikey was hired.
- Guano (voiced by Gary Mack) is a small purple creature who stars in and directs LilyMu. His LilyMu character is a parody of Pikachu, right down to only saying his name. In the episode "A Christmas Mikey", he is revealed to be Ozu's long-lost son wearing a costume.
- Ozu (voiced by Stephen Moverly) is the often-temperamental owner and producer of LilyMu, and owns various properties around Tokyo.
- Yes Man (voiced by Jesse Adams) is a hyperactive, overdramatic servant/scapegoat of Ozu who agrees with everything he says. He enjoys working for Ozu and is rarely seen away from him.

=== Recurring characters ===
- Mr. and Mrs. Simon (voiced by Dan Green and Meredith Zeitlin) are Mikey's parents. They are unseen characters, but they have been featured in the episodes "The Lost Pilot", "Easy Come, Easy Gonard", "Lost in Transportation", "The Switch", "Saving Face", and "La Cage Aux Mikey".
- Speed Racer is an older, androgynous version of the famed racer. Speed makes a cameo appearance in the theme song as the LilyMu team's limousine chauffeur and in the pilot episode. Despite having the body of a middle-aged man, the character has eyelashes and the deep feminine voice like that of a young boy.
- Yoshi (voiced by Jesse Adams) is the main camera man for the LilyMu series, Yoshi is a shy, blond, beer-bellied man, who is featured in many episodes, sometimes as a main role (such as in Battle of the Band), but mostly as an Easter egg. He appears to live in LilyMu Towers with the other cast members. Like Yes Man, he is frequently prone to be the butt of violence, regardless of intention.
- The Dancing Sushi are little sushi-beings that serve as scene transitions or bumpers. They are sometimes accompanied by other random characters, such as a sushi chef or a sumo wrestler. The three main Dancing Sushi starred in the spin-off miniseries Dancing Sushi. In this show, their names are Larry (after Larry Schwarz), Roro, and Salmon, and a female sushi named Meep was created to round out the main cast.
- Socky (voiced by Adam Moreno) is a sock puppet pop icon with a mind of its own, spokesperson for Hitoshi Beauty Cream, and rival of Lily for Tokyo Trend's Top 50 Most Beautiful list. Socky has become one of LilyMu's most persistent antagonists.
- Ethel (voiced by Kether Donohue) is an old lady who appears at least once in every episode, sometimes in a speaking role, but mostly as a background extra.
- The Cat Burglar (voiced by Wayne Grayson) is an unnamed bandit who is a recurring antagonist. In his initial appearance, he was thought to have only one arm, due to the other being covered by his coat.
- Gonard's mother (voiced by Sean Schemmel) is the unnamed mother of Gonard who still lives with her. In "The Switch" she has a woman's voice. In "The Fugi-kid" and all the succeeding episodes, Gonard's mother speaks in a falsetto voice with an Irish accent.
- The Kappas (voiced by Carrie Keranen) are water spirits that are based on the creature of the same name in Japanese folklore who Mikey's LilyMu character is named after, they are described by Ozu as fish out of water and Mikey being an American in Japan. They live around a river in the middle of the jungle.
- Dr. Takashi Katashi (voiced by Wayne Grayson) is a doctor. In "Plastic Surgeon To The Stars", he wears a generic doctor headband over his eye. Dr. Katashi performs an unintentional 'pimple enlargement' on Mikey. He did plastic surgery on Socky, to make him beautiful, information which led to Socky's downfall. Katashi also appears to have a degree in dentistry, according to "The Bracemaster". He performs a check-up on Mikey, Gonard, Lily, and Mitsuki, and reports that only Mikey has an overbite, and needs a retainer. Katashi has a dark side as well as he steals Ozu's retainer and family heirloom for its value, with plans to sell it for a green sports car.
- Agent Yoshida (voiced by David Brimmer) is a Japanese government agent who arrested Mikey for a crime he did not commit. However, later on, he arrests the real crook, with Mikey's help. Agent Yoshida is hired by Ozu to investigate a DVD infringement ring in Back To School. However, after months on the case, he finds no suspects. With LilyMu's help, he finally arrests the students behind the crime.
- The Pirate Captain/Pirate King (voiced by Sean Schemmel) is the captain of a pirate ship and five other pirates. In "Go Nard Hunting", he replaces Gonard's role on LilyMu.
- Masako Masako (voiced by Lex Woutan) is a beloved red-carpet fashion critic. She appears again as a news correspondent in "The Karaoke Episode: Part II".
- The Chums are an outcast biker gang who accept Mikey as an "honorary member" when he is convinced that the rest of the LilyMu cast are leaving him out of activities. They are big fans of LilyMu. Mikey eventually becomes friends again with the cast, but the Chums keep in touch with him using a whistle whenever he needs help.
  - Beef is the leader of the Chums who Mikey becomes most acquainted with.
- Kenji is a Tokyo street urchin who loves the LilyMu show. Kenji has a dog named Mr. Poopers and many friends, including Mikey look-alike Jomar.
- Mr. Stereo (voiced by Wayne Grayson) is one of Ozu's company sponsors and business partners in "Lost In Transportation". Mr. Stereo sells stereos at bargain prices, and claims that if his stereos don't please his customers, he will do crazy things, even though he does them anyway. He has a spoiled son named Timmy who is a huge fan of LilyMu. Mr. Stereo appears again in "Seven LilyMu" to host the LilyMu live performance in the Megastore, in honor of his tenth store.
- The Tatami Twins (voiced by Erica Schroeder) are two fat children who are the sons of Mr. Tatami. They mistake Guano for a toy, and even throw Lily and Mitsuki into the 'Tatami Room' for "shoplifting". They make a second appearance in "Manic Monday', purchasing Gonard and Guano's cursed tiki idol, in an attempt to pass on the bad luck.

== Production ==
Larry Schwarz conceived the series in 2000, when he was working at Rumpus Toys, a toy design company in New York City. In September 2001, Rumpus and Sunbow Entertainment partnered to work on the series. In May 2002, the project was picked up by Noggin (a channel owned by MTV Networks) for its teen-oriented programming block, The N. Noggin/The N signed a co-development deal for the series, while Animation Collective retained the series' copyright and distribution rights. By the time animation was completed, The N had shifted more to live-action shows for young adults, so Kappa Mikey was moved to another MTV Networks-owned channel: Nicktoons Network. The series was tweaked in order to fit Nicktoons Network's younger audience. Voice talents were usually local, and its audio was recorded at Manhattan-based NYAV Post, which Michael Sinterniklaas owns. Larry Schwarz, along with the other executive producers, oversaw all phases of production, but only had writing credits on the pilot episode, "Mikey Impossible" and "A Christmas Mikey". All the episodes were directed by Sergei Aniskov. The instrumental score was composed by John Angier, who also wrote the lyrics to "The Recycling Song", "Ori and Yori's Hits", "Living With Mikey", "How Did We Get Here?" and the songs from "The Karaoke Episode".

Unlike other cartoons produced at the turn of the 21st century, the property was owned by the studio instead of an agency, the animation was not outsourced and the episodes were written by full-time staff. After producing Internet-based projects and television spots, the series became Animation Collective's first television series. The series was produced in New York City; pre-production began in 2002 and animation started in the summer of 2005. Production wrapped in September 2007.

The series was animated in Adobe Flash, with some moments of CGI rendered in Maya. To further emphasize the contrast in animation styles, one group of animators was assigned to the anime characters, and another group was in charge of Mikey and the other American characters. The vehicles on LilyMu and around Tokyo, as well as the weapons, the Gonard balloon, Pirate King's ship, the Karaoke Genie Machine, etc., were created in Maya and exported into Flash using the Toon Filter. The backgrounds were modeled in Maya, and texture, details, and clouds were added in Photoshop. Some of the backgrounds were inspired by actual locations in Tokyo. The show's anime-style characters perform with large comedic overuses of face faults, such as a face or body turning into an exaggerated general appearance, or becoming much smaller. This allowed animators to have more control over how a character looks and acts than in many other Flash shows, and they did not always have to be on-model. The show uses clichés common to anime, including the sweat drop, lines over the eyes or no eyes at all, big heads, flaming eyes, and bodies becoming smaller. Sometimes Mikey will try to do these things, which was one of the show's running gags, but cannot due to being drawn in an American style.

== Episodes ==
Note: All episodes of the series were directed by Sergei Aniskov.

=== Series overview ===
Season	Episodes	Originally released		Rank	Average Viewers (in millions)
Season	Episodes	First released	Last released	Rank	Average Viewers (in millions)
0	Pilot	March 23, 2004 (MTV Pilot)	January 30, 2005 (Nicktoons Pilot)	TBA	TBA
1	26	February 25, 2006	April 28, 2007	TBA	TBA
2	26	June 9, 2007	September 20, 2008	TBA	TBA

=== Season 1 (2006–07) ===
No. overall	No. in season	Title	Written by	Storyboard by	Original release date	Prod. code
1	1	"The Switch"	Conrad Klein & Leila Strachan	Stuart Yellin	February 25, 2006	101
Mikey moves in with Lily and Mitsuki. But Ozu then kicks Lily and Mitsuki out, and into a gross apartment with no window, but Mikey trades apartments with them. In the subplot, Guano has trouble with the box tower on the set, and is handcuffed by Gonard and the two try to unlock the cuffs.
2	2	"Mikey Impossible"	Colin Jost & Chris Reisig	Sangjun Chon	February 25, 2006	102
Mikey destroys Ozu's bonsai tree and tries to replace it. There is no subplot in this episode.
3	3	"Ship of Fools"	Rob Dubbin, Colin Jost & Chris Reisig	Sangjun Chon, Scott Crockett & Dave Simons	March 4, 2006	103
Mikey trades Gonard to pirates for an illegal version of the new LilyMu video game, but they rescue him with the Super Gonard Balloon that he lost early in the episode. In the subplot, another Mikey blows into town, and Lily falls in love with him, while Mitsuki does not.
4	4	"Saving Face"	Steve Lookner; Conrad Klein & Leila Strachan	Scott Crockett & Sangjun Chon	March 11, 2006	104
Mikey panics when he gets a pimple, and to keep it from becoming public, he trades a photo of him for embarrassing photos of his castmates, but confesses it all in the end. In the subplot, Lily tries to beat Socky in Tokyo Trend's top 50 Beautiful People List.
5	5	"The Fugi-Kid"	Len Wein, Colin Jost & Chris Reisig	Stuart Yellin, Sangjun Chon, Scott Crockett & Dave Simons	March 18, 2006	106
LilyMu has a prop on loan from the government: a hi-tech invisibility jacket. Naturally, Mikey goes and fools with it, leading to its theft by a 'one-armed-man'. Mikey is framed, convicted, and nearly goes to jail – but, he escapes from the officer holding him, and finds himself on the lam. In order to clear his name, he must catch the man who stole the coat and prove himself innocent. There is no subplot in this episode.
6	6	"Mikey Likes It"	Conrad Klein & Leila Strachan	Dave Simons & Sangjun Chon	March 25, 2006	107
Mikey accidentally throws out Mitsuki's photo album when he gets carried away with recycling. In the subplot, Ozu stages a romance between Gonard and Lily.
7	7	"Easy Come, Easy Gonard"	Chris Reisig	Sangjun Chon, Scott Crockett & Dave Simons	May 27, 2006	110
Mikey is elated upon receiving his first paycheck from LilyMu Studios (after the initial shock that he is paid for acting), so he's naturally eager to spend it. He ends up buying off a younger crowd of fans by promising them to pay for merchandise in his likeness from Tatami Megastore. However, the owner of Tatami Megastore, Mr. Tatami, informs him he owes 20 million in yen (approximately $173,000) for the toys the fans bought, and he has to get the money in 24 hours or face certain doom in The Tatami Room. In the subplot, Mitsuki and Lily attempt to rescue a scared-witless Guano from the two spoiled sons of Mr. Tatami, who think that Guano is a doll.
8	8	"Lily Meow"	Conrad Klein & Leila Strachan	Stuart Yellin, Sangjun Chon, Scott Crockett & Dave Simons	June 3, 2006	112
Mikey adopts a lost kitten named Kello to gain popularity, but instead the cat gains more popularity than the entire LilyMu franchise. After the platform that Kello the kitten was on from above comes crashing down, he gets injured, Ozu blames the LilyMu team (except Guano) and fires them. They then hire the Cat Burglar (from The Fugi-Kid) to steal the kitten, but little do they know, the coat crook eats cats. In the subplot, Lily and Mitsuki argue over the placement of their characters' mannequins in a LilyMu store.
9	9	"The Good, the Bad, and the Mikey"	Conrad Klein & Mike Yank	Sangjun Chon	July 8, 2006	114
Mikey goes to the dark side after learning that the USA hero, Captain Impressive, was canned for being too Goody Goody. In the subplot, Lily finds out that Mitsuki has a crush on Mikey.
10	10	"The Sumo of All Fears"	Colin Jost	Sangjun Chon, Scott Crockett & Dave Simons	August 5, 2006	109
Unable to lift a prop that others can easily, Mikey is determined to get in shape and he and Guano go to the gym. There, he gets a new rival in the shape of a Yokozuna whom he accidentally challenges. Mikey and Guano get trained by a janitor who makes them do his job, among other things. Mikey inexplicably beats the Yokozuna by tickling him, but once he does, he becomes Yokozuna, and everyone he encounters wants to challenge him as well! In the subplot, Gonard is hit by a tennis ball machine and exaggerates the injury to get the girls to pamper him.
11	11	"Lost in Transportation"	Gerry Duggan, Conrad Klein & Leila Strachan	Sangjun Chon	August 20, 2006	105
Because he doesn't fit in the LilyMu battle wagon or Lily's car, and feeling left out by his friends lately, a stubborn Mikey wanders off and falls in with a biker gang called The Chums ("Chum it up!".). This is bad, because the rest of the gang is at the birthday party of their biggest sponsor's son- and he wants to see Mikey most of all. There is no subplot in this episode.
12	12	"Splashomon"	Colin Jost & Chris Reisig	Sangjun Chon, Scott Crockett & Dave Simons	August 27, 2006	111
Ozu puts the cast of LilyMu in charge of watching one of his prized items only to come back and find it missing. Now it's up to Mikey and the gang to tell their side of the story of what really happened, only to make matters worse than what they really are. There is no subplot in this episode.
13	13	"Big Trouble in Little Tokyo"	Colin Jost & Chris Reisig	Scott Crockett	September 3, 2006	113
Guano is tired of the LilyMu cast ignoring him. Mikey doesn't even listen to him when he tells him not to go to the secret floor in LilyMu Towers. When they get to the floor, they meet a mad scientist who made all the monster movies. But after going back to retrieve an item for Mikey, Guano gets confined to the secret floor. Mikey, in an attempt to free Guano, supersizes Gonard,, who starts to attack the city. His friends finally listening to him, Guano supersizes himself and defeats Gonard, turning him back to normal. In the subplot, Ozu has Yes Man perform dangerous comical bloopers.
14	14	"The Phantom of the Soundstage"	Chris Reisig	Ray Alma & Scott Crockett	October 28, 2006	122
When Mikey discovers a book on good pranking, he immediately pulls "innocent" pranks on the rest of the cast. Lily and Mikey hear that the soundstage is haunted by the Phantom of the Soundstage, who is Ozu's janitor by day, and whose soul purpose is to punish anyone who dare pull a prank. Lily is fed up with Mikey's pranks, so she aligns herself to the Phantom to get revenge with the biggest prank ever. In the subplot, Guano gets covered in yellow-green paint due to Mikey's antics and has to deal with his fear of possibly losing his "suit" with Gonard's help.
15	15	"Battle of the Bands"	Conrad Klein & Mike Yank	Sangjun Chon, Scott Crockett & Dave Simons	November 4, 2006	116
The gang discovers unused musical instruments in the soundbooth and decides to form the LilyMu band! The catch: they are all terrible at it. While they are practicing at Mikey's apartment, Ozu, from the hallway, mistakes the ringtone on Mikey's cell phone for the real thing (them playing the instruments). Immediately seeing the money rolling in, Ozu spends millions on ads for a very special LilyMu musical episode! The band must keep their cover by pretending to play, in sync with Mikey's ringtones. When they become bigger than ever, things get complicated when a rival musical group named Ori and Yori accuse them of being phonies, leading Mikey to foolishly challenge them to a showdown. There is no subplot in this episode.
16	16	"A Christmas Mikey"	Conrad Klein, Mike Yank & Larry Schwartz	Rami Efal	December 9, 2006	126
After being turned down a new contract by Ozu (which is later given to him at the end), Mikey wishes he never came to Tokyo, but is convinced otherwise by his Guardian Angel. In the subplot, Ozu hates Christmas because his family ditched him, but he learns to love it from the ghosts of Christmas past, present, and future, the latter of whom says it will be a Christmas when he sees his son again. Note: This episode was produced as the season finale, but it was aired as the sixteenth episode in the United States.
17	17	"The Lost Pilot"	Conrad Klein & Larry Schwarz	Stuart Yellin	January 6, 2007	108
Mikey wins a scratch off contest and moves to Tokyo to become the new star of LilyMu, but is given a hard time by Lily and the others, but they decide to give him one more chance. There is no subplot in this episode as this was the first episode in the series. Note: Despite being the series' pilot, this episode was the eighth in production order to account for several scenes being reanimated. This episode was also aired very late into the series because of the delay.
18	18	"La Cage Aux Mikey"	Conrad Klein, Mike Yank & Alan Yang	Rami Efal	January 27, 2007	118
When a reporter from Cleveland visits the set to do a story on Mikey, Mikey lies about his friends to make himself sound more important. When his parents read the story and announce that they're coming to visit, Mikey must get his friends to play along with all his outrageous lies. In the subplot, Ozu torments Yes Man once again by making him the guinea pig for his new weather-controlling invention when his golf game is rained out.
19	19	"Reality Bites"	Conrad Klein & Mike Yank	Scott Crockett	February 3, 2007	117
Ozu makes LilyMu into a reality show, and the gang tries to convince Ozu to change it back.
20	20	"With Fans Like These"	Leila Strachan	Travis Cowsill, Scott Crockett & Ray Alma	February 17, 2007	119
Mikey is kidnapped by well-meaning but confused fans who want to protect him from Gonard, thinking he is a real-life villain. In the subplot, Guano is forced to use subliminal advertising to make people give gifts to Gonard and Lily.
21	21	"Big Brozu"	Conrad Klein, Colin Jost & Mike Yank	Sangjun Chon, Scott Crockett & Stuart Yellin	February 19, 2007	115
Ozu's twin brother and rap guru Brozu shows up unexpectedly and wants to change the LilyMu company. He fires Ozu and decides to hire Mikey as the new producer. Mikey thinks it will be an easy job, but turns out to be terrible at it. This causes Lily, Mitsuki, Guano and Gonard to quit the show and go on strike. Brozu also moves to LilyMu Towers and starts holding parties every night... right above his brother's penthouse apartment. Everything seems hopeless until they discover a loophole in Brozu's contract. There is no subplot in this episode.
22	22	"The Man Who Would Be Mikey"	Guiseppe Ziplovia	Sangjun Chon	March 3, 2007	120
After Mikey sells a LilyMu prop, he has to find a replacement for them to finish a shoot. He finds a sword stuck in a rock called "The Dragon's Spike". When he shows off its powers, his friends (except Mitsuki) start hanging out with him just to enjoy the sword's magic, and they start to fight over his friendship. The gang soon finds out that the sword is actually a real spike from a dragon's tail, and the dragon now wants to eat Mikey for waking him up from his thousand year nap.
23	23	"Uh Oh, Guano"	Conrad Klein & Mike Yank	Rami Efal	March 24, 2007	121
Ozu announces the LilyMu show will be shown internationally. The first country they release it outside Japan is Buttstonia, where it has been edited to the point of being ridiculous. They get paid though, unfortunately, it is in the nation's currency which can't be exchanged into other currency, making it completely worthless everywhere else. Mikey is appalled to discover that the United States has retitled it as "Mighty Go Go Guano" and reedits it to make Guano the star, due to cliches, American cultures and the beginning of the whole LilyMu show. Guano, however, has fears of people with cameras and begs Mikey to make him unpopular. In the subplot, Gonard, Lily and Mitsuki hire a Buttstonian servant named Sergu who will do everything they want if they pay him in his nation's currency.
24	24	"Like Ozu, Like Son"	Ryan Koh	Rami Efal	April 7, 2007	123
Nobody remembers that it is Mikey's birthday, so to cheer him up, the gang throws a surprise party for him, but to no avail (which Lily relishes). Ozu, who realizes that Mikey doesn't have a father figure in Japan, proposes that he be his son for a weekend, and they go on a boating trip that immediately goes awry, stranding them in the middle of an ocean. In the subplot, Gonard and Guano discover a lost baby bird, and experience parental difficulties as they try to teach it to fly.
25	25	"La Femme Mitsuki"	Conrad Klein & Mike Yank	Travis Cowsill & Ray Alma	April 21, 2007	124
Mitsuki is discovered to have led a life of espionage before her days on LilyMu when a mysterious stranger (who, in possible reference to Get Smart's Agent 13, is stuck in a mailbox suit) tries to convince her to return to her past life. Now they come back to finish the plan, but it means putting Mikey in the thick of danger as well. In the subplot, Gonard meets an "Earthie" (hippie, really), who inspires him to become one himself after Lily thinks it will be fun watching him make a fool of himself, that is until Gonard and the "Earthie" start living with her.
26	26	"The Oni Express"	Conrad Klein & Mike Yank	Sangjun Chon	April 28, 2007	125
Mikey discovers a secret society called the Order of the Oni, a cult that Yoshi, and later, the rest of the cast, join. Mikey wants in, but has to fulfill three initiation tasks, and has trouble keeping everything about the Order a secret from non-members. In the subplot, Yes Man goes missing, so Ozu calls on Guano to be his temporary Yes Man until he finds the original one.

=== Season 2 (2007–08) ===
No. overall	No. in season	Title	Written by	Storyboard by	Original release date	Prod. code
27	1	"Camp!"	Walt Gardner & James Harvey	Stuart Yellin	June 9, 2007	203
The cast complains they need a vacation, so Ozu cleverly tells them to head to Kawamora Acres Luxury Spa, when it really turns out to be an acting summer camp for children. Mikey reveals to have stage fright, after a traumatic childhood experience comes back to haunt him. In the subplot, Gonard is separated from the group and is instead taken to Cheerleading Camp.
28	2	"Free Squiddy"	Chris Reisig	Lauren Bergholm	June 10, 2007	205
Mikey befriends an emperor squid at the set of Gonard's favorite show, Chefs of Steel, and tries to prevent it from becoming the secret ingredient, to be cooked by its best chef, Chef Saba. In the subplot, Guano's suit becomes dirty again. He takes some cream from a mysterious man, which only causes it to become adhesive... so much so, that Lily, Ozu, Yesman, and a bunch of objects form a ball around him.
29	3	"The Bracemaster"	Leila Strachan	Travis Cowsill, Henry Hilaire Jr. & Katy Shuttleworth	June 16, 2007	201
Mikey needs a retainer because of his poor brushing habits. Ozu has a retainer made by the mysterious Bracemaster on Mount Fuji and guarantees that the retainer will fix Mikey's teeth in one month. However, Dr. Katashi steals the precious retainer, and now Mikey and Lily must travel to Mount Fuji and convince the Bracemaster to make a new one. In the subplot, Guano dresses up as a panda bear because the one he ordered is busy at a "Cute Parade". Soon after, though, a zoo keeper comes and snatches Guano up because he thinks that he is a real panda.
30	4	"Hog Day Afternoon"	Robert Berens	Lauren Bergholm	June 24, 2007	202
Mikey "borrows" a defective microchip for his upgraded motorcycle at Beef's Bikes, and at once, turns it into a talking bike with a mind of its own. In the subplot, Lily is frustrated that she can only get one friend on SuperFunPlace, a MySpace-related website, while Mitsuki, Gonard and Guano can all get friends in a matter of seconds. While trying to hold a publicity campaign to make Lily more popular, Gonard somehow manages to turn her into a Viking princess.
31	5	"Mikey at the Bat"	Walt Gardner & James Harvey	Henry Hilaire Jr. & Michael Wetterhahn	July 1, 2007	206
Ozu lets his rivalry with Socky overshadow a friendly game of baseball. As usual, Lily is the pitcher for the team, but after Mikey introduces a baseball card of his great-grandfather, Tex Simonowski, Ozu decides to make Mikey the pitcher. Meanwhile, Socky makes a deal with Lily. If she throws the game and makes Team LilyMu lose, she'll get to star in Socky's show. Things worsen when Mikey realizes he's a terrible pitcher, and Ozu bets the show for the game.
32	6	"Go Nard Hunting"	Ryan Koh & James Harvey	Hal Forsstrom	July 15, 2007	207
Gonard eats a radioactive sandwich, which makes him a genius at everything. Although this gains him many awards and advances in science and technology, it jeopardizes his friendship with Mikey, as well as his role on LilyMu. In the subplot, Lily, Mitsuki and Guano compete to see who can get the most endorsements.
33	7	"Mikey, Kappa"	Walt Gardner & Robert Berens	Henry Hilaire Jr. & Katy Shuttleworth	August 5, 2007	208
Mikey floods the studio, so to complete filming, the gang travels on location, to the Yodo River in the middle of the jungle. Mikey meets Japanese water spirits called kappa, which his LilyMu character is named after, and helps save their energy supply of water. In the subplots, Lily and Mitsuki meet a Tarzan-like figure named Wolf Boy, while the rest of the cast try to survive.
34	8	"Script Assassin"	Mike Yank	Lauren Bergholm & Lauren Ceredona	August 12, 2007	209
Guano quits after an emotional dispute over creative ownership with Ozu. The cast panics when Ozu replaces him with a script doctor named Ken Katsumoto, who also happens to be a ninja, and who is famous for killing (taking) off major characters in any show he works on. In the subplot, Guano winds up on a talk show for children about dealing with grown-ups.
35	9	"Mitsuki Vanishes"	Daniel Schofield	Lauren Ceredona & Michael Wetterhahn	August 19, 2007	210
Mikey loses Mitsuki's ticket to the bullet train ride to a fan club dedication ceremony in Nagano. The gang has to leave her in Tokyo, while the rest of them board the train. Bored, Mikey explores the train only to find Mitsuki tied up. Someone knocks Mikey out and the next time we see him, he is back in his train car. Mikey tries to convince the gang that something bad has happened to her. When they get to Mount LilyMu, Mitsuki is in danger of a falling avalanche, which Mikey saves her from, and Mount LilyMu is left in half of what it was. In the subplot, Yes Man quits after a bad day of service to Ozu.
36	10	"The Masked Tanuki"	Leila Strachan	Hal Forsstrom & Henry Hilaire Jr.	August 26, 2007	211
Ozu wants the local superhero, the Masked Tanuki, on his show to boost ratings. Mikey and Gonard try to lure him in by pretending to rob their own studio, only to lure in the Cat Burglar, who in turn, kidnaps them for revenge. In the subplot, Lily and Mitsuki investigate Guano's apartment, which has been unknown to everyone since they've known him.
37	11	"Back to School"	Leila Strachan	Lauren Bergholm, Lauren Ceredona, Chia-Chi Chen, Christina Ghiloni, Lemwell Navera, Bob Rutan, Katy Shuttleworth & Michael Wetterhahn	September 2, 2007	216
Ozu and his crew go undercover as students and faculty at the local Mount Lebaniku High School, in order to figure out who's behind a DVD bootlegging ring, making illegal copies of their show. Mikey, unable to fit in with any of the cliques, winds up with two nerds. In the subplot, Gonard becomes the Mount Lebaniku football teams' secret weapon against their rival.
38	12	"Manic Monday"	Robert Berens	Lauren Ceredona & Katy Shuttleworth	September 3, 2007	212
A pair of mystical friendship bracelets magically switch Lily and Mitsuki's bodies, and they agree to live the other's life for a while, so Mistuki can finally date Mikey. Lily ends up working with a pair of environmentalists named the Do-Gooders. In the subplot, Gonard and Guano are cursed by a tiki idol.
39	13	"Mikey's Place"	Robert Berens & Sean Boyland	Lauren Ceredona & Michael Wetterhahn	September 16, 2007	214
Mikey opens a Kappa Mikey-themed restaurant, which does lousy until Gonard starts preparing dishes for it. A competing restaurant nabs Gonard and hypnotizes him into making dishes for them instead. In the subplot, Lily is caught red-handed showing hatred toward babies, so Ozu forces her to take care of a baby for one day to regain LilyMu's reputation. When the baby crawls away, Guano is forced to take his place.
40	14	"LilyBoo"	Robert Berens, Sean Boyland & Conrad Klein	Lauren Bergholm & Lauren Ceredona	October 28, 2007	213
At a video rental store on Halloween, Mikey comes across a "creepy, unmarked" DVD, and after watching it, he and his friends are cursed. Their one way to break the curse is to assist a girl named Samoa to find her gobstopper in a haunted house, looking out for clues from the DVD itself. There is no subplot in this episode. This episode is a parody of The Ring.
41	15	"Night of the Werepuff"	Ryan Koh, Robert Berens & Conrad Klein	Michael Wetterhahn	October 28, 2007	224
Mikey gets lost in Yoyogi Park and meets a Werepuff, a monster who eats peoples' clothes, and Mikey turns into one when his pants are eaten off. Lily feels suddenly attracted to him, and they soon become a celebrity couple. The only way to cure him is if he eats the fur of the original Werepuff before midnight. There is no subplot in this episode.
42	16	"The Karaoke Episode"	Ryan Koh & Sean Lahey	Katy Shuttleworth	February 16, 2008	222
43	17	"The Karaoke Episode"	Ryan Koh & Sean Lahey	Lauren Bergholm & Henry Hilaire Jr.	February 16, 2008	223
Mikey finds a karaoke machine run by a robotic genie. Mikey insults the genie, causing it to put a curse on him and his fellow LilyMu cast members so that they can't stop singing, parodying different musical genres ranging from hip-hop to opera.
44	18	"Mikey's Memoirs"	Ryan Koh & Walt Gardner	Lauren Ceredona, Hal Forsstrom, Henry Hillaire Jr. & Michael Wetterhahn	February 17, 2008	218
Ozu orders Mikey to write a chapter of his autobiography for a magazine tomorrow, but things go haywire when Guano assists Mikey in publishing it, leading to trouble with a tough rock band. In the subplot, Gonard is discovered to be a descendant of a ruler, and invites Lily and Mitsuki to his coronation.
45	19	"Seven from LilyMu"	Ryan Koh & Walt Gardner	Hal Forsstrom, Lauren Ceredona & Henry Hillaire Jr.	February 24, 2008	215
The cast responds to a distress call from a poor boy and LilyMu fan named Riku, whose playground is about to be destroyed by an evil Garbage Man to make way for a landfill. However, used to doing live shows, the five are under the impression that this is just another gig, and Riku thinks they are real heroes instead of actors. In the subplot, Ozu, Yes Man and Yoshi get stuck in a submarine in a parody of The Hunt for Red October. Also, the plot of the main story is based on the western movie The Magnificent Seven, and the title is a parody of this as well.
46	20	"Mikey and the Pauper"	Conrad Klein, James Harvey & Walt Gardner	Lauren Ceredona & Katy Shuttleworth	March 2, 2008	220
Tired of his pampered lifestyle as an actor, Mikey, along with Guano, leaves the studio and gets lost in the Filth District, where they both trade places with an urchin named Jomar who looks just like Mikey (in anime form) and his dog. Mikey and Guano join a gang of street performers, but when they discover they're helping them steal from the rich, they quit, only to be caught by the circus. In the subplot, Jomar has difficulty fitting into the LilyMu lifestyle.
47	21	"The Clip Show"	Conrad Klein	Lauren Ceredona, Michael Wetterhahn, Lauren Bergholm & Katy Shuttleworth	March 9, 2008	218
In Kappa Mikey's take on the classic "clip-show" episode, Ozu forces Guano to complete his own clip show of LilyMu before the plane for their vacation leaves that night. Helping Guano as they might, they keep getting distracted by montages of memories from previous episodes that, according to Guano, "you've seen dozens of times". There is no subplot in this episode. Note: Due to this episode airing out of production order, clips from future-aired episodes are featured.
48	22	"Tin Putt"	Robert Berens, James Harvey & Conrad Klein	Lauren Bergholm & Lauren Ceredona	March 16, 2008	221
Ozu takes his crew to a local miniature golf club named Mini Pines, where he competes against his rival of many years, Richard McMillions III. Mikey ends up filling in for Ozu once it is discovered that he is a pro at golf. In the subplot, Lily and Mitsuki compete for a membership package. In another subplot, Guano teams up with a patriotic gopher against the club's lawn keeper in a parody of Caddyshack.
49	23	"Live LilyMu"	Robert Berens & Ryan Koh	Michael Wetterhahn & Henry Hillaire Jr.	March 30, 2008	226
The first-ever live episode of LilyMu is plagued by a series of problems. Note: This episode was produced as the series finale, but it was aired as the twenty-third episode in the United States.
50	24	"Mitsuki Butterfly"	Ryan Koh	Katy Shuttleworth	September 6, 2008	204
Kappa Mikey becomes enamored with a beautiful actress at the national Kabuki house, unaware that it is Mitsuki. Note: This episode is the first appearance of Mitsuki's father chronologically; due to the episode being aired out of order, several episodes prior feature him in a minor role or cameo.
51	25	"Fashion Frenzy"	Lelia Strachan	Lauren Ceredona, Henry Hillaire Jr. & Christine Kwon	September 6, 2008	225
Lily's favorite fashion designer, Ogi, visits her apartment to seek the next wave of trends. He is attracted not to Lily's line, but to Mikey's, which is basically clothing with messy substances over them, and they both compete to have their line win him over. In the subplot, Ozu lends Gonard his prized exercise machine, but it soon takes control over his sanity.
52	26	"The Wizard of Ozu"	Robert Berens & James Harvey	Lauren Bergholm, Lauren Ceredona, Katy Shuttleworth & Michael Wetterhahn	September 20, 2008	217
Ozu forces Mikey to give up his smelly, good-luck sneakers, which puts Mikey's friendship with his cast mates at stake when none of them stick up for him. Once again, he threatens to quit and go back to America during a tornado, but gets caught in the middle of its eye. He dreams he is taken to a colorful place called The Land of Ozu, with his friends playing famous parts from the film on which the episode is based. There is no subplot in this episode. Note: Despite this being the final episode to air, as well as being packaged as the final episode on iTunes, "Live LilyMu" was intended to be the finale, going by production order.

== Dancing Sushi ==
Dancing Sushi is a spin-off series based on the brief bumpers within the series. The series features four sushi characters – Salmon, Larry, Roro, and Meep – who all want to become the world's biggest pop stars. Unlike the main series, Dancing Sushi lacks any dialogue. The sushis were "voiced" by individuals involved in the original Kappa Mikey series including John Angier, the composer of the series, and director John Holt.

Dancing Sushi was produced from October 2007 to December 2007. It was intended as a way to continue offering fans of Kappa Mikey more of the same kinds of characters in the same universe, and also to keep animators working on the transition between the studio's two major shows; Speed Racer: The Next Generation was in production soon afterwards.

== Merchandising ==
In April 2005, 4Kids Entertainment was appointed as the exclusive licensing agent for the series.

== Home media ==
A Kappa Mikey DVD was released on September 18, 2007 under the Starz Home Entertainment brand, and includes the episodes "Lost in Transportation," "Easy Come, Easy Gonard," and "The Man Who Would Be Mikey," all from the first season, as well as bonus material, including a fictional music video of "I'm Alright" taken from the episode "Battle of the Bands," wallpaper, an interactive game parodying Hollywood Squares, and a How-to-Draw-Mikey tutorial.

In 2008, the Animation Collective site advertised a second DVD that was scheduled to be released sometime later that year. However, the announcement was removed from the website, leaving the exact release date unknown. The DVD was intended to include the first season in its entirety, with DVD extras, and would have been considered more of an "official" volume than the last one. No further announcement has been made as the status of this DVD. As of 2009, this release is shelved.

Season 1 (Episodes 1–13) was released on DVD on September 12, 2007 , and Season 2 (Episodes 14–26) was released on DVD on March 12, 2008 by Anchor Bay Entertainment in Australia.

The soundtrack for "The Karaoke Episode" is available as a downloadable album on iTunes. Both seasons of the show itself were also available for download from iTunes before they were later taken down from the online retailer.
