= List of Speed Racer: The Next Generation episodes =

Speed Racer: The Next Generation is an American animated television series based on the classic Japanese Speed Racer franchise. The series debuted on Nicktoons Network on May 2, 2008, and ended on August 25, 2013.

== Series overview ==
Season	Episodes	Originally released	
Season	Episodes	First released	Last released
1	26	May 2, 2008	July 5, 2009
2	26	March 24, 2011	August 25, 2013

== Episodes ==
=== Season 1 (2008–09) ===
No.	Title	Directed by	Written by	Original release date	Prod. code
1–3	"The Beginning"	Stephen Moverley	Justin Gray, James Palmiotti	May 2, 2008; April 27, 2008 (Nickelodeon)	101-103
Speed arrives at the Racing Academy and meets all of the main cast. With no race car of his own, Conor lets him use a junky, spare one for the Qualifying Race, known as "LOST HERO". Having destroyed the car, his key, which was left to him by his mysterious father, glows, and leads him to find the Mach Five's hood disassembled from the other pieces of the car. Speed and his friends rebuild the Mach Five and test it out. However, Annalise, under Zile's orders, destroys it in a match against X. Spritle reveals a shocking surprise to Speed; that he is Speed Racer's son and is X's long lost brother. Speed and his friends discover the secret plans to build the Mach Six and its unique engine from the remains of the Mach 5. Speed uses the new car to race once again against Annalise, and wins. NOTE: Only the first episode aired on Nickelodeon on April 27, 2008.
4	"The Low Price of Fame"	John Holt	Gerry Duggan	May 9, 2008	104
Speed takes advice from X on how to deal with the fame of being Speed Racer's son from his classmates. A crazy stalker student named Mitch spreads a rumor that Speed will have a rivalry race with his brother, X, which spirals into a real race. When Annalise sees X not taking this seriously, she stands up and sabotages Speed's car so X can win.
5	"Be Cruel to Your School"	John Holt	Marv Wolfman	May 16, 2008	105
Speed and X must work together as a team in order to win a multi-school racing tournament. Meanwhile, Zile plans to ruin Speed and X's teamwork during the tournament and destroy the Mach 6.
6	"The Note"	John Holt	Aaron Bergeron	May 23, 2008	106
Speed gradually receives mysterious notes signed by his father, but he suspects that they could be false. When he receives another letter asking for Speed to come meet him, Speed goes to figure out who the imposter is. Meanwhile, Zile plans to have his birthday party. At the end of the episode, Speed receives a real note from their father.
7–9	"The Fast Track"	John Holt	Ben Gruber	June 27, 2008	107-109
Thanks to Joel the lab technician, Zile takes over the virtual track to mess up Speed's race at the Redwood Rally so he doesn't survive. After Speed suspects whats going on, he decides to investigate, but in the process, Speed, Annalise and the Mach 6 all get sucked into the virtual track. While Speed and Annalise are still stuck in the virtual track, they must put their differences aside to survive. Meanwhile, Conor, Lucy, and X must find a way to get them out before the track eats itself up due to the virus, or they'll be stuck there forever. Two vehicles from the original show- the Mammoth Car (from episodes 7 and 8) and the X3 make cameos in this episode. Speed and Annalise make it out of the track. Delighted, Zile finds out Joel installed the virus, and decides to promote him to make the track more deadly for Speed and the Mach 6. One thing Zile is not aware of is that the Mammoth Car, the X3, and Jungle Conor invade the real world to wreak more havoc. Meanwhile, the Jungle Conor kidnaps Annalise.
10	"Honor Code"	John Holt	Rob Klein	July 25, 2008	110
Speed is faced with expulsion when it appears he cheated in a race. Knowing that he was framed, Speed sets out to find the real culprit. Meanwhile, Chim-Chim has mysterious glitches.
11	"The Dance"	John Holt	Mike Yank	August 1, 2008	111
Annalise’s cousin, Elsa, arrives at the campus as an exchange student, in order to seduce Speed into giving out information about the Mach 6… just in time for the school dance. Lucy is suspicious of the girl's motives in wanting to date Speed. Meanwhile, with no date of his own, Conor takes drastic measures.
12	"Top Car"	John Holt	Daniel Schofield	August 8, 2008	112
Ronald Multon, an esteemed car designing prodigy and old rival of Conor's, comes to the school as a guest lecturer. Furious that Ronald is in fact a complete hack, and stole all of his ideas, Conor challenges him to a design face-off, where they both bet each of their cars.
13	"Video Essay"	John Holt	John Holt	September 5, 2008	113
In this clip show showcasing the last 12 episodes, Speed must complete Professor Nguyen's assignment about what he learned since joining the academy. NOTE: This was the first episode of TNG where John Holt both directs and writes, and also the first episode were the animation was not out-sourced.
14–16	"Comet Run"	John Holt	Daniel Schofield	September 19, 2008	114-116
Trillionaire Dickie Ranford challenges anyone who dares face him to a three-day race inside the virtual track, against his new eco-car, which will run on only one tank of gasoline for the entire run. Speed competes, as winning Ranford's industry will finally enable him to finish refining the Mach 6. Zile also participates, intending to beat Ranford at his game and crush the Mach 6. By the second day of the race, both the Mach 6 and Chim-Chim get smashed by a canyon avalanche overnight. Speed uses his wits to go forward by using the natural elements to their advantage. At first, they think Zile tricked them into going the wrong direction. But they soon discover that it was Ranford who caused the avalanche and wrecked their car... and that his Eco-car is only keeping the emissions building up inside the front hood and he is actually storing leaded gasoline in Ranford Cola bottles to use for later, proving him a complete fraud. Speed shares the secret of the eco-car to Zile, who reluctantly lets Speed pass ahead of him so he can beat Ranford for him. At the finish line, Speed wins first place, and Ranford's car breaks down, earning him last place, but costing him his secret, and his reputation. When Speed starts planning his future with the industry, the press shares that Ranford industries went bankrupt and that the only things left were 2500 desks, chairs, staplers and a six pack of Ranford cola.
17	"Plot for Teacher"	John Holt	Aaron Bergeron	October 10, 2008	117
Damien Russ, a classic legendary racer, and the last person to see Speed Racer before his disappearance, visits the school to promote a drink he is sponsoring. Professor Winn uncharacteristically shows disdain toward Russ, as her past connection with Speed Sr. is revealed. Speed and his friends suspect Damian of trying to get control of the Mach 6 and kill Speed, but his business partner wants to destroy the Mach 6. The episode's name is a pun on the song "Hot for Teacher".
18	"Knight Racer"	John Holt	Rob Klein	October 17, 2008	118
In a parody of Knight Rider, Zile appoints Speed to test out a Zazic Industry-made vehicle named VIC, which has the ability to speak and operate its own functions. Zile also secretly intends to use VIC to destroy Speed and the Mach 6 for good. Meanwhile, Conor and Annalise compete during School Spirit Week.
19	"Money Problems"	John Holt	Allan Neuwirth	January 19, 2009	119
Spritle steps down from his post as headmaster when it appears he smuggled profits from other racing schools into his bank account, and he is replaced with a stricter professor who makes harsh new policies. Speed goes to clear his uncle's name. In the midst of investigating the case, Conor is expelled. Zile receives a call from a mysterious woman...
20–22	"The Great Escape"	John Holt	Allan Neuwirth	January 30, 2009	120
Conor invents a new camouflage defense mechanism for the car, which activates unexpectedly when Speed and Chim-Chim walk inside, leaving them invisible. Zile launches a heist to steal the Mach 6 at night, but cannot see the car, and captures Conor instead. Meanwhile, X and Annalise's relationship becomes strained. The camouflage feature malfunctions, Speed is caught sneaking around trying to save Conor, and the entire gang makes a retreat. They leave the Mach 6 behind, but to Zile's disappointment, there is a force field around it, and it becomes invisible again. A suspicious Spritle calls the police, where the gang doubles back to save the Mach 6. His plan now exposed, Zile flees the campus and leaves Annalise in charge of Zazic Industries. The news of Zile being a traitor is now widespread among the campus. Annalise continues to carry out Zile's plan by taking X-ray shots of the Mach 6 during a race, under the shadowy woman's orders. Annalise also breaks up with X for good. Meanwhile, Zile and Stan keep having to move out of their luxurious global hideaways whenever Stan gives away their location.
23–25	"The Secrets of the Engine"	John Holt	Mike Yankn	February 27, 2009	123-125
During the final days of the term, Dr. Chezko, an engineer and old friend of Speed Racer's, arrives with a chamber that will finally run the Mach 6 on purely natural energy - its final piece - and asks Speed's permission show it off to the academy. Zile, returning undercover as a janitor, works with Annalise to steal the chamber and embarrass Speed by replacing it with a double. Meanwhile, Spritle plans a family bonding trip to his camping retreat for the break. Zile and Annalise steal the Chezco chamber and keep it hidden until they can meet with the head of the committee; Speed and X sneak into Zile's tower. Once they do, Conor and Lucy both return to help Speed and X regain the Chamber. But once they do, Zile and Annalise do whatever they can to get it back. Before Speed can activate the chamber he must go a speed of 820 miles per hour. After he does this the chamber won't work until they make a special cloth. When Chesko and Conor do this Speed enters the Mid winter race. Speed realizes that the chamber will only work when it has air, so he chooses to use the air in his car to power the engine. He wins the race and returns to the track with only a little air left. In the end, Chezko turns out to be Speed Racer Sr.'s engineer, Sparky. X decides to go pro, which would mean leaving the school. Speed Racer Sr. finally reveals himself to his son, Speed. This episode features the voice of NASCAR racer Jeff Gordon, who voices Turbo McCalister.
26	"This Is Speed Racer"	John Holt	Ben Gruber	July 5, 2009	126
A special episode that recaps the important events of the first season. It also hints at what will happen in the upcoming episodes of Speed Racer: TNG.

=== Season 2 (2011–13) ===
Note: All episodes of this season were directed by Jay Surridge.

No. overall	No. in season	Title	Written by	Original release date	Prod. code
27	1	"The Return, Part 1"	Adam Moerder	March 24, 2011	201
Speed Racer Sr. finally returns and reunites with his sons; however, X is angry with him. The Mach 6 is stolen by Zile and the Racer family works together to retrieve it and get Zile arrested. After getting back the Mach 6, Conor discovers a mysterious energy signal coming from the Mach 6, forcing the gang to investigate.
28	2	"The Return, Part 2"	Adeline Colangelo	March 31, 2011	202
School is back in session at the Academy. However, the Mach 6 starts to exhibit new capabilities during a race.
29	3	"The Return, Part 3"	Adam Moerder	April 7, 2011	203
Speed and his friends are attacked by the shadow committee. When they start to believe that Zile is somehow responsible, Annalise helps X and Speed get into the prison to question him about the attack. Meanwhile, Jared and Jesse spy on Speed and the gang for the Shadowy Woman and the Committee.
30	4	"Together We Stand, Part 1"	Adeline Colangelo	April 14, 2011	204
Speed and his pals must work with Annalise in class, but they have doubts about whether she's trustworthy. Annalise soon warms up to the group, but when it is time for the final team race, the Shadowy Woman contacts her and orders her to make sure that Speed and the Mach 6 are sabotaged by one of the men during the race. However, despite the Shadowy Woman's threats, Annalise takes the hit for Speed instead but loses her car in the process.
31	5	"Together We Stand, Part 2"	Adam Moerder	April 21, 2011	205
The students are forced to mix up and swap cars. When another student, Mitch, drives Jared and Jesse's car, he receives a message from the Shadowy Woman to get the Mach 6 files and decides to steal them for himself. Meanwhile, Speed and Conor go into the virtual track to find out how the attackers from the team race got into it and find that the attackers manage to create a tear allowing them complete access.
32	6	"Together We Stand, Part 3"	Adeline Colangelo	April 28, 2011	206
Speed and the gang go to Spritle to tell him about the tear in the virtual track. However, this causes Spritle to shut down the track for a week until it can be repaired. When Speed Racer Sr. warns the gang about the Alpha Academy, Speed and his pals investigate the school. Meanwhile, Speed figures out that one of the Alpha students somehow managed to steal Annalise's car. Also in a b story Annalise gets a new car made by Conor.
33	7	"The Hourglass, Part 1"	Adeline Colangelo	May 5, 2011	207
Spritle hires a new security team for the Racer Academy and Speed doesn't trust them. They soon figure out that the security team works for the Shadow Committee and is trying to scan the Mach 6. Later after recovering the disk, the gang checks to see if they got the right one, only to uncover a new missing piece of the Mach 6 shaped like an hourglass.
34	8	"The Hourglass, Part 2"	Adam Moerder	May 12, 2011	208
While Conor experiments to try to find the missing part to the Mach 6, he accidentally opens up a time vortex!. While the gang tries everything they can, Conor finally figures out a way to close it. Speed must "jump" through the vortex to go into the past. Past Conor doesn't remember a thing, but Speed plays a DVD of "Future" Conor, saying that they must not experiment for the part anymore and that Tuesday is Taco day. Speed and Conor both realize that they must now hunt down the missing part before it gets into the wrong hands.
35	9	"The Hourglass, Part 3"	Adam Moerder	May 19, 2011	209
When the crew receives a contact from Speed Sr., Speed assumes that his father needs their help at the Alpha Academy, so he, X and Annalise go undercover and sneak into the school to find him. While X gets into trouble with Headmaster Moustache, Speed and Annalise find a secret lab at the bottom of the school only to be caught by Speed Sr., who was actually undercover the whole time and only meant to send the message telling Speed and the gang to stay away from the school. He then reveals that the project they are working on is Project Hourglass. He tells them about the Shadow Committee and how they are trying to make their own version of the Mach 6's missing part though he is not sure why. He then immediately shows them a way out of the school. Back at Racer Academy, Speed and Annalise tell X, Conor, and Lucy everything they heard from Speed Sr. at the Alpha Academy.
36	10	"The Hunt for Truth, Part 1"	Allan Neuwirth	October 18, 2011	210
X and Speed help Conor and Lucy test out the virtual track only to see that it is back in perfect condition. Spritle invites Handles Mustache and the Alpha students to race three invitational races and to have a dance, which Speed and Lucy decide to go to together. During the first race, Mustache forces Alpha to use a mysterious device on the Mach 6 causing it to spin out of control. Speed and Conor spend hours trying to figure out whether or not there was something wrong with the car and end up missing the dance that night much to Lucy's dismay. For the second race, Mustache uses the device on Speed again. Chim-Chim helps them figure out that it was in fact Alpha and Mustache who sabotaged the Mach 6 by investigating the Alpha team's garage. Meanwhile, X and Annalise decide to start dating again.
37	11	"The Hunt for Truth, Part 2"	Allan Neuwirth	October 25, 2011	211
Speed, Conor and Chim-Chim learn that Alpha does in fact have the hourglass part. They inform Lucy who is still mad at Speed for forgetting about the dance, so she decides to ask Alpha herself. When she does, he explains everything to her. Mustache overhears the conversation and kidnaps Lucy claiming that she knows too much. He contacts Alpha, Speed and Conor to tell them that he has Lucy and that in order to get her back they need to race just as Mustache ordered them to do or else. During the race, Alpha somehow manages to disable the part, and Speed wins. However, Mustache escapes with Lucy, who overhears a conversation between him and the Shadowy Woman. Speed, X, Conor, Annalise and Alpha all manage to save her, but the Alpha Academy is destroyed by the Shadow Committee. Luckily, everyone is able to escape. The kids then find a disc left by Speed Sr. in the lab Speed and Annalise found with a message to X and Speed saying that he and everyone else in the school had to be rushed out of there leaving them coordinates to their current destination.
38	12	"The Hunt for Truth, Part 3"	Allan Neuwirth	November 1, 2011	212
After receiving the message from Speed Sr., Speed and the gang all decide that they need to go save him, but Lucy stays behind to decipher more of the disc only to find a strange energy reading on it. Meanwhile, Speed, X, Conor, Annalise and Alpha continue on with the mission only to be attacked by a mysterious group of "scorpion-cars" and Alpha goes missing. They manage to find a secret hideout, where all the Alpha students were kept after the destruction of Alpha Academy, but the gang quickly learns that all the students, including Speed Sr., were brainwashed by a mysterious mind-control device. When one of the members of the Shadow Committee, Baron Von Moniacle tries to use it on the kids, Speed and X are able to avoid it, but Conor, Annalise and Chim-Chim are brainwashed as well. Just when everything is starting to fall apart, Lucy rushes in with Spritle, Zile Zazic and even Damien Russ to save the day, and Speed Sr. and all the Alpha students go back to normal when X destroys the mind-control device. However, Von Moniacle escapes but not before telling Speed Sr., X and Speed that they are not finished just yet. When they return to Racer Academy, Speed Sr., X and Speed all agree that they will soon need to retrieve the hourglass part.
39	13	"Racing with the Enemy, Part 1"	David McGrath	November 8, 2011	213
Racer Academy is hosting a sponsor fair in which sponsors offer the students a chance to be supported. X is excited about this opportunity while Speed, however, is not interested and only wants to be by their father's side. Meanwhile, Speed Sr. and Damien explain that they found a base run by the Shadow Committee and are planning to go and infiltrate it. Speed offers to help, but Speed Sr. refuses and goes alone with Damien. During the sponsor fair race, X performs a few reckless moves despite Speed and Lucy's warnings. He wins the race and meets Lord Bowler, the CEO of RocketAir, who gives him an offer, which X immediately accepts. While they are making deals, two intruders are spotted on the area. X offers to help catch them and takes the new eco-friendly Green Car, made by RocketAir. When he does find the intruders, he is shocked to see that it is Speed Sr. and Damien, and tries to go after them, but Bowler calls him back to the lab. X is upset that his father was probably lying to him and Speed all this time about wanting to make a difference in the world. It is then he meets the Shadowy Woman, who asks him for help.
40	14	"Racing with the Enemy, Part 2"	David McGrath	November 15, 2011	214
X officially goes pro with Rocket Air leaving Speed and Annalise desperate for another team member. Speed Sr. and Damien inform the kids on the Shadow Committee's secret weapon, the Red Bolt, someone who drives a black car with a blood red lightning bolt on it. The two of them go back to infiltrate the Committee's headquarters again while the kids reunite with X who is excited about going pro. Before the race starts, Speed Sr. calls Speed telling him that he and Damien are under attack asking him to help. X and Speed go to help, and they all manage to get away. Speed Sr. and Damien reveal that they rescued Alpha leader, who informs them all that the Committee is about to attack during the pro race. The gang prepares themselves, but while they are worrying about the race, Lucy informs Speed that the Red Bolt and Jared and Jesse broke in and kidnapped Alpha leader. Speed goes after them and tries to convince the Red Bolt to let Alpha go, but the Red Bolt is revealed to be no one other than X!. He tries to convince Speed that the Committee is trying to make the world a better place, but Speed refuses to listen. X then drives Speed off the road and escapes, leaving his little brother both shocked and hurt.
41	15	"Racing with the Enemy, Part 3"	David McGrath	November 24, 2011	215
Hurt by X's sudden betrayal, Speed returns to Racer Academy and informs his father, Speed Sr. and his friends about X being the Red Bolt. He then immediately decides to go to Shadow Committee headquarters, and get both X and Alpha back. Speed Sr. and Damien try to stop him, but fail to do so while Annalise and Lucy go to help Speed and Conor. When they get closer to Shadow Committee headquarters, the kids are attacked by the scorpion cars. Luckily, they manage to capture one for Speed and Chim-Chim to use as cover to gain access into the building. They get in and find Alpha leader locked in a cell. Just when they are about to try to leave, X finds them and tries to explain to Speed about the Committee's plans to make the world a better place, including the completed version of the hourglass part, but Speed refuses to listen and give into the Committee. Just when X and Speed are fighting over the part, Chim-Chim stuns X, but Speed, X, Alpha and Chim-Chim all disappear with the part.
42–44	16–18	"The Shadow World"	Adam Moerder and Adelaine Colangelo	July 28, 2013	216-218
The Hourglass Part transports Speed, X, Alpha and Chim-Chim to an alternate dimension, where the Shadow Committee runs the Racer Academy, known as the Alpha Military Academy. Not only do they have to find a way to get home, but they are all separated. Speed and Alpha try to blend into the school and try to find Conor thinking he will help them, but they end up seeking help from Zile, Stan, Annalise, Jared and Jesse who are against the Shadow Committee. Meanwhile, X joins up with the Committee, Lucy and Conor to help them find the Hourglass Part and Chim-Chim ends up in a dumpster found by an alternate Speed Sr. and Spritle, who are mechanics. After a battle with the Committee and Zile's team, Alpha ends up captured. Lucy explains to him that his alternate counterpart is supposed to be dead and because she was in love with him, she left Zile's team to join the Committee. X leads the Committee to Zile's secret base, where he tries to convince Speed to join him only to purposely leave Speed to die as the Committee raid the base. A brief chase ensues between the Racer brothers as Speed tries to get X to see the Committee's true colors when Annalise, Zile, Stan and the twins are captured by the Committee. While trying to get information out of the Resistance, Conor accidentally erases Annalise's memories, which allows X to begin to see how dangerous the Committee really is. Meanwhile, Speed is left alone in the desert and runs into Speed Sr., Spritle, Damien and Chim-Chim. They attack the school and X apologizes to Speed realizing that his little brother was right. With the help of Speed Sr. and Spritle, Speed, X, Alpha, Chim-Chim and the Resistance manage to escape. After saying their goodbyes, Speed, X and Chim-Chim use the hourglass part to return home, but Alpha decides to stay in the alternate dimension to help claiming that Speed and X are the real heroes in their home dimension.
45–47	19–21	"Family Reunion"	Allan Neuwrith and David McGrath	August 4, 2013	219-221
Speed, X and Chim-Chim return to their home dimension. Unfortunately, they end up back in Committee headquarters, but they decide to use it to their advantage and grab all the files concerning the Hourglass Part and the Mach 6. When trying to escape, they come face-to-face with the Shadowy Woman, who reveals herself to be Trixie Tredwell Racer, Speed Sr.'s wife, and X and Speed's mother. She tries to get X and Speed to join her, but they refuse and escape with Chim-Chim. Meanwhile, Annalise, Lucy and Conor are still running from the Committee soldiers. Speed contacts them, and they agree to meet up and escape. However, X and Speed find themselves in their old neighborhood. They walk into their old house and run into Speed Sr. who explains to them how Trixie, their mother became the Shadowy Woman. When the boys were younger, Trixie's father and Speed Sr. worked together to design a prototype for the Mach 6. When Trixie's father wanted to race it, Speed Sr. refused and Tredwell ended up losing control of the car killing himself and hitting Trixie at the race station. Trixie inherited the company, and became the Shadowy Woman and the CEO of the Committee forcing Speed Sr. to take the boys away. The Racer men's conversation is then interrupted when Annalise, Lucy and Conor come in still being chased by the Committee. Speed Sr. takes the Mach 5 while the boys join their friends in the Mach 6. They try to get away, but Trixie comes onto the scene and confronts Speed Sr. while Speed, X and their friends get away. Unfortunately, Speed Sr. is seemingly killed in an explosion. Deeply saddened by this, X and Speed decide to go back in time with the Hourglass Part to prevent the accident and get their father back. They travel with Lucy and Conor back to before the accident. They convince a young Spritle to let them see the prototype, but Zile and Stan follow them in and get them caught. Aniskov keeps them in detention, but with Chim-Chim's help, they escape and manage to stop the accident from happening. However, Zile has overheard them talking and realizes that they are from the future. He and Stan take the Mach 6 but are thwarted by Speed and the gang. He is arrested and the crew returns home safely to find X and Speed's parents happily married, and their family still together. Note: Speed Sr. mentions that the accident with Trixie's father took place 16 years prior to the series. Since Speed Jr. is seen as an infant, it could only be inferred that Speed Jr. is 16 years old while X is about 17 years old.
48–50	22–24	"The Iron Terror"	Eric J. Dannenberg	August 11, 2013	222-224
The crew returns to the present to find that Speed Sr. and Trixie are happily married, and that their anniversary party is the next day. Speed and X find Speed Sr. a gift while Lucy helps them find Trixie a gift, since they never really knew their true mom. The party soon turns into trouble when Speed Sr.'s brother, Rex Racer (Racer X) comes into the party. Speed Sr. and Trixie order him to leave, knowing he has some troubles, but he tell them that a factory is going to be blown up. Speed and X decide to visit him, who he then tells them about the enemies' plan. X becomes cautious and think that he and Speed should leave. Rex goes to the factory alone where half-robot-half-car roborgs are preparing to blow the plant up. X and Speed see an explosion as they are driving and check it out finding the factory blown up and X Sr.'s car smashed, with him missing. They tell their parents, who scold them for disobeying them. Speed and X soon decide to ask Spritle for help, but find him missing and his office ransacked. Meanwhile, Speed Sr. is preparing to do a commercial, and decides to let the police deal with Spritle's disappearance as he feels the commercial is more important. Briefly after this, Trixie visits the garage, believing Speed is there trying to come to terms with Spritle's disappearance, only find the Iron Menace. During the motor oil commercial Speed Sr. is arrested for the disappearances; due to evidence found in the garage. Speed and X visit him in jail, but as they are leaving, an explosion occurs and they witness roborgs take their father; while racing to the rescue, Annalise cuts them off and crashes into a cliff face. Speed and X rush to her aid, only to find that she is actually a robot. Back at the school, Iron Menace, speaking through Annalise explains that he has the missing Racers and how to find him. At his lair they enter a virtual track and discover that Zile, now a cyborg, is actually the Iron Terror. X and Speed have to navigate a virtual maze to save Rex, Spritle, Trixie and Speed Sr. from getting "erased" in a giant hourglass. With some help from Chim-Chim everyone is saved. Zile then escapes with the robot Annalise and Stan (who is now a brain in a jar) Speed and X then chase after them, only to find that they have created a new hourglass part. X and Speed catch up to Zile, but just as they seemingly block his only avenue of escape Zile time travels. Afterwards, Speed Sr. apologizes to Rex and they, along with Speed and X race on the virtual track. Noticed Time Changes: Zazic tower no longer exists, Trixie is no longer the warped shadowy woman, the committee is seemingly non-existent, Speed Sr. is more of a self-absorbed celebrity type, Mitch is now a huge Speed Racer Sr. fan and a gofer for Speed Sr., Rex Racer (Racer X) is an eccentric loner conspiracy theorist that lives in a trailer, the real Annalise and her mother have severed all ties with Zile, Zile Zazic is now half-human and half-robot with his right arm being the same as Chim-Chim's, Stan is now a brain in a jar with a speaker, Professor Winn's accident did not happen in the new timeline.
51	25	"Gotcha!"	Allan Neuwrith	August 18, 2013	225
Taking place between "Hunt for the Truth, Part 3" and "Racing with the Enemy, Part 1", the students of Racer Academy all gather together to play "Gotcha!", a game that was banned from the Academy, so in order to make sure they don't get in trouble, Speed and Conor distract security from the campus and make sure that Spritle and the teachers are all asleep. The students are required to wear certain gauntlets on their wrists that explain the rules of the game and tell the person wearing it who their target is going to be. The game begins, and Speed and Lucy team up and look around campus together to help each other out. Jesse goes after X and chases him into the Control Room in the school. While horse-playing there, Jesse accidentally breaks the console allowing X to escape and is then tagged by Annalise, but when he is tagged, he suddenly vanishes into thin air leaving his gauntlet behind. The same thing then happens to Tyler after Mitch tags him. When Mitch tries to warn Annalise and X, he is tagged by Annalise, and disappears himself followed by X and Annalise. Soon enough, all the students, Aniskov, Spritle and Conor have all disappeared leaving Speed, Lucy and Chim-Chim alone. Not knowing what to do to get everyone back, Speed and Lucy apologize to each other for what has happened between them after the situation with Alpha leader and end up kissing, which ends up bringing them to where everyone else is in the virtual track. Conor explains that the reason everyone was disappearing is because of Jesse breaking the console in the control room, which activated the discarded metal that was constructed from scrap metal from the Virtual Track that Conor found. Chim-Chim who is in the outside world manages to activate a portal that sends them back to the real world only to get Conor in trouble with Spritle.
52	26	"Shrinkage"	Eric J. Dannenberg	August 25, 2013	226
Conor's new invention accidentally shrinks Speed, X and Lucy, and now they must survive being small until they can get Connor's attention.

== DVD releases ==
The first DVD of the series was released on May 6, 2008, by Lionsgate Home Entertainment; it contains the first movie, or first three episodes. The DVD was released in North America and other NTSC regions on May 6, 2008; a PAL release has not yet eventuated. A second DVD containing the second 3-part episode, "The Fast Track", and more bonus features, was released on October 7, 2008. "Comet Run" was released on May 12, 2009.

Volume name	Release date	Contains
Speed Racer: The Next Generation – Vol 1: The Beginning	NTSC: May 6, 2008	"The Beginning, Part 1" "The Beginning, Part 2" "The Beginning, Part 3"; Interactive Racing Game; Creating the Next Speed Racer Featurette; Bloopers and Stills
Speed Racer: The Next Generation – Vol 2: The Fast Track	NTSC: October 7, 2008	"The Fast Track, Part 1" "The Fast Track, Part 2" "The Fast Track, Part 3"; The Animation of Speed Racer: The Next Generation; Sneak Peek with Jeff Gordon; Trailers
Speed Racer: The Next Generation – Vol 3: Comet Run	NTSC: May 12, 2009	"Comet Run, Part 1" "Comet Run, Part 2" "Comet Run, Part 3" Trailers gallery
