= Piano: The Melody of a Young Girl's Heart =

Anime television series

- The Right Stuf/Nozomi Entertainment Volume 3 DVD Cover

ピアノ (Piano)
- Genre: Drama, Romance
- Created by: Mami Watanabe; Animate
- Anime television series
- Directed by: Norihiko Sudo
- Produced by: Koichi Kikuchi; Tomoko Takayama; Yuuko Yamada; Toshiaki Okuno; Shukichi Kanda
- Written by: Mami Watanabe; Ryunosuke Kingetsu
- Music by: Hiroyuki Kouzu; Ayako Kawasumi
- Studio: OLM
- Licensed by: NA: Nozomi Entertainment
- Original network: Kids Station
- English network: NA: Anime Network; US: Anime Selects
- Original run: November 11, 2002 – January 13, 2003
- Episodes: 10

Piano: The Melody of a Young Girl's Heart (ピアノ Piano, stylized as PIANO) is an anime television series which aired from November 11, 2002, to January 13, 2003, and ran for 10 episodes. Three volumes were released on DVD by Right Stuf under their Nozomi Entertainment label in the North America as well as a complete collection in one collectors edition package, with their English dub being produced by NYAV Post. Centering on Miu Nomura (野村 美雨 Nomura Miu), the story follows her as she struggles to rediscover the joy in music and playing piano she once knew as a child. Character designs were done by Kōsuke Fujishima who came up with the concept and idea for the show.

== Plot summary ==
Miu Nomura always played the piano and found it to be one of the greatest joys in her life. Even when she was a little girl the music she played on her piano made her heart soar, a feeling she desired to share with anyone who would listen, as she eagerly shared her talent on with the piano to those around her. As time passed, she became an introverted teenager far too shy to express her feelings and even unable to do it through her music anymore. It has gotten so bad that her playing has suffered greatly and her piano teacher has grown impatient with Miu's continual failure to live up to the expectations he knows she is capable of reaching if she could just try a little harder.

Miu's crush on an upperclassman named Takahashi doesn't help and only adds to her emotional state. Even her best friend, Yuuki, who notices Miu's crush cannot help because she too has a crush, on a third year track star named Takizawa. What is remarkable though, is this crush of Miu's might in fact be helping her playing, and might make it possible for her to once again find the joy in music she knew as a child, the joy that allowed her to play such beautiful, emotional music that captured the hearts of all those that listened.

It is Miu's teacher's hope that a little pressure on her to compose her own piece and play it at the spring recital, will do just that, but problems with Takahashi, and problems in her own life seem to continue to hinder Miu's growth, despite the spark she has once again shown in her musical playing since developing her crush on Takahashi.

== Characters ==
- Miu Nomura - Voiced by: Ayako Kawasumi (Japanese); Rebecca Soler (English)
- Shirakawa - Voiced by: Mitsuru Miyamoto (Japanese); Marc Diraison (English)
- Kazuya Takahashi - Voiced by: Jun Fukuyama (Japanese); Michael Sinterniklaas (English)
- Seiji Nomura - Voiced by: Akio Ōtsuka (Japanese); Sean Schemmel (English)
- Hitomi Nomura - Voiced by: Yūko Sasaki (Japanese); Veronica Taylor (English)
- Akiko Nomura - Voiced by: Michiko Neya (Japanese); Vibe Jones (English)
- Yuuki Matsubara - Voiced by: Tomoko Kawakami (Japanese); Zoe Martin (English)
- Nagasawa - Voiced by: Atsushi Kisaichi (Japanese); Brian T. Schneider (English)
- Takizawa - Voiced by: Soichiro Hoshi (Japanese); Drew Aaron (English)
- Ms. Yuunagi - Voiced by: Misa Watanabe (Japanese); Eva Christensen (English)

== Anime ==
The anime uses two pieces of theme song. "...to you" by Ayako Kawasumi, played by Ayako Kawasumi on the piano, is the opening theme, while "Kokoro no Oto" by Yoko Ueno is the ending theme.

=== Episode listing ===
No.	Title	Original release date
1	"~with feeling~" "~con sentimento~"	November 11, 2002
2	"~with tenderness~" "~con tenerezza~"	November 18, 2002
3	"~with spirit and energy~" "~con spirito~"	November 25, 2002
4	"~with activity~" "~con allegrezza~"	December 2, 2002
5	"~with a wavering heart~" "~con passione~"	December 9, 2002
6	"~with life~" "~con brio~"	December 16, 2002
7	"~with heart, extravagantly~" "~con bravura~"	December 23, 2002
8	"~with a chill, as though sinking~" "~con melancolia~"	January 3, 2003
9	"~with love~" "~con amore~"	January 6, 2003
10	"~with compassion~" "~con grazia~"	January 13, 2003

== Reception ==
Mania.com's Mark Thomas feels that the anime's music is "in complete harmony with theme of the series". Writing for The Los Angeles Times, Charles Solomon ranked the series the ninth best anime on his "Top 10".
