= Larry Schwarz =

American animation producer, entrepreneur, writer, and photographer

- Born: January 20, 1970 (age 56)
- Education: University of Pennsylvania; Cardozo School of Law
- Occupation: Producer
- Years active: 1997–present

Larry Schwarz (born January 20, 1970) is an American animation producer, entrepreneur, writer, and photographer. He was the founder and CEO of now-defunct cartoon studio Animation Collective. He is best known for creating Kappa Mikey.

== Early life ==
Schwarz was born in 1970. He was a child actor and stand-up comedian and enjoyed playing with puppets. In fourth grade, Schwarz "had a filmmaking club" wherein friends created live-action movies on Super 8 film which Schwarz's father would edit. One of these was an unfinished remake of Star Wars.

In 1992, Schwarz graduated from the University of Pennsylvania with a political science degree. He then visited Vietnam and launched the Vietnam Business Journal to connect American entrepreneurs with the country. He graduated from the Benjamin N. Cardozo School of Law in an unknown year.

== Career ==
=== Rumpus Toys ===
After attending law school, Schwarz realized that he wanted more playfulness in his career causing him to start a toy brand. In 1996, while living with his parents, Schwarz began designing his own plush toys under the Rumpus Toys brand, an online-only toy company. According to Animation World Network, Rumpus became "a company selling character-based plush toys online, backed up by Flash-animated segments featuring [Schwarz's] characters." The corporation was headquartered on 24th street in Chelsea, Manhattan. By winter of 1997, Schwarz was able to produce a small lot of his toys in China.

Shortly before a toy fair in 1997 Rumpus toys were insulted by representatives of Toys R Us, who did not return Schwarz's phone calls. However, specialty toy chain FAO Schwarz expressed interest for the unique toys and ordered 60 dolls for their flagship store in Manhattan. Demand for Rumpus toys increased when TV host Kathie Lee Gifford displayed organ-themed plush toy Gus Gutz on her show, after which Noodle Kidoodle and eToys.com began to invest in the brand. At this point, the Rumpus company was worth $1 million and had 9 employees. In 1998, Rumpus participated in the New York International Toy Fair.

By 1999, the Rumpus toy brand was worth $15 million. With a staff of 36 in a polka-dotted company headquarters in the Flatiron District, Schwarz founded the Rumpus website, which housed toy sales as well as original Flash animations produced in-house. Toys designed by Schwarz included friendly Monster in My Closet, organ-displaying Gus Gutz, programmable alarm clock toy Wake Me Willy and cat toy Harry Hairball.

Schwarz's goal was for Rumpus to become an entertainment brand that created animated films alongside toy sales, "like Disney." By April 2002, however, the Rumpus website had shut down, and the new domain holder announced that Rumpus Toys has "closed its doors."

=== Animation Collective ===
Larry Schwarz was the CEO of now-defunct animation studio based in New York City, Animation Collective. The studio produced Kappa Mikey (and its spin-off Dancing Sushi), Thumb Wrestling Federation, Leader Dog: The Series, Tortellini Western: The Series, Three Delivery, and Speed Racer: The Next Generation for Nicktoons Network and Ellen's Acres, HTDT, and Princess Natasha for Cartoon Network. In addition, Schwarz served as producer of Wulin Warriors for Cartoon Network and the first season of The Incredible Crash Dummies for the FoxBox. Animation Collective also created games and webisode cartoons for AOL, including Princess Natasha.

=== Larry Schwarz and his Band ===
Schwarz is the CEO of Larry Schwarz and His Band, which produced Alien Dawn (2013-2014) for Nicktoons Network and Team Toon (2006-2013) for Cartoon Network. Both series, produced in partnership with Fremantle Media Kids and Family Entertainment, were created by Schwarz.

In February 2020, Schwarz announced that he is producing Dinosaur, Mermaid, Racecar, Pufferfish along with Believe Entertainment Group.

== Publications ==
In 2017, Schwarz co-wrote the young adult trilogy Romeo, Juliet and Jim along with Elise Allen. It includes "homages to Shakespeare and Truffaut." In 2023, he co-wrote and published young adult adventure The Jules Verne Prophecy with Iva-Marie Palmer. He is also a photographer who has published male photography work in books and online.
