= Ellen's Acres =

- Title card featuring the main protagonist.
- Created by: Larry Schwarz
- Directed by: Stephen Moverley
- Voices of: Emily Corrao; Marc Thompson; Carrie Keranen; Shannon Conley; J. David Brimmer
- Narrated by: Emily Corrao
- Opening theme: "Acres of Fun" performed by Emily Corrao
- Composer: John Angier
- Country of origin: United States
- No. of seasons: 2
- No. of episodes: 52 (26 unaired)

Production
- Executive producers: Larry Schwarz; Christopher Fauci; Michael Gold; Sean Lahey; Sergei Aniskov
- Producer: Andi Defur
- Editor: Lauren Krueger
- Running time: 12 minutes approx.
- Production companies: Animation Collective; Kanonen & Bestreichen

Original release
- Network: Cartoon Network
- Release: September 4, 2006 – February 5, 2007

Ellen's Acres is an American animated television series for preschoolers which exclusively premiered weekly on Cartoon Network and in the United Kingdom, the show aired on Cartoonito. Animation Collective produced the series. It originally premiered on September 4, 2006 on Cartoonito in the UK, and later on January 8, 2007 on Cartoon Network in the US, but was later cancelled on February 5, 2007. The series features a very imaginative five-year-old girl named Ellen who has adventures in a hotel her parents own approximately 40 mi (64 km) from Tonopah, Nevada named the Emerald Acres.

== Format ==
Each episode begins with Ellen narrating the adventure she had in her imagination, but she says, "Actually...", and the scene changes to a desert area, and Ellen says, "I had just gotten off the bus from school and was saying goodbye to Mateo, my bus driver." She then says goodbye to the unseen driver who closes the bus doors, honks the horn twice, and drives off.

Ellen then says hello to her friend, a tire, and carries a feather duster, two useful props in her adventures, then takes them to the hotel offices, where her parents ask how school was and Ellen explains the first adventure. Ellen then sees what her parents are up to (finding a fossil, fixing a fan because the air conditioning broke, etc.) which leads into further imaginary adventures based on chores she's been asked to do.

== Characters ==
- Ellen – The protagonist of the series, a five-year-old girl who moved to Nevada with her parents and has a very vivid imagination. She has red hair, pigtails, huge teeth (with a gap in the center), carries a backpack, wears a light green T-shirt with a daisy, a denim skirt, a pair of mismatched socks (one with two green stripes on her left leg and one with a red and blue stripe on the right leg) and black Mary Janes. Born in Los Angeles, CA, Ellen plays with a Hercules 17 steel-reinforced all-season tire she befriended in nursery school and a mauve-colored hypoallergenic feather duster as her toys, theatrical company and posse. Emily Corrao is the voice of Ellen.
- Ellen's parents – Mom, a sports lawyer and former agent, and Dad, an ex-professional skateboarder and amateur geologist, moved to this bucolic desert location near mines forty miles from Tonopah, Nevada after he completed his career in athletics when they decided to settle down. Together, they run the Emerald Acres Hotel. Carrie Keranen is the voice of Mom, while Marc Thompson is the voice of Dad.
- Cooter and Connie – The heart and soul of Emerald Acres, Cooter is the resident handyman and Connie is the maid in charge of the place. Shannon Conley voices Connie while J. David Brimmer is the voice of Cooter.
- Mateo – Ellen's unseen bus driver, who drops her off at the hotel at the beginning of every episode.

== Episodes ==
=== Season 1 ===
Episode Number (Overall)	Episode Number (Seasonal)	Episode Title	Episode Costume(s)
1 (1a)	1 (1a)	Dinosaur Lore	Arctic Explorer; Cowgirl; Cavewoman; Diver
2 (1b)	2 (1b)	Jumpin' Jupiter	Film Noir; Explorer; Arctic Explorer; Astronaut
3 (2a)	3 (2a)	Chocolate Chip Treasure	Pilot; Cavewoman; Princess; Pirate
4 (2b)	4 (2b)	Kitten Caper	Actress; Explorer; Egyptian; Ringmaster; Superhero
5 (3a)	5 (3a)	Eloise	American Indian; Mermaid; Astronaut; Explorer
6 (3b)	6 (3b)	A Mammoth Adventure	Scout; Sheriff; Arctic Explorer
7 (4a)	7 (4a)	Gold Rush Fever	Pro Wrestler; Explorer; Mermaid; Pirate
8 (4b)	8 (4b)	Mr. Healey	Cowgirl; Princess; Miner
9 (5a)	9 (5a)	Swamped	Greek; Hockey Player; Explorer
10 (5b)	10 (5b)	Stinky Situation	Astronaut; Pilot; Detective
11 (6a)	11 (6a)	Dance Fever	Reporter; Explorer; Diver; Ballet Dancer; Disco Dancer
12 (6b)	12 (6b)	Wallpaper Secrets	Astronaut; Pilot; Explorer; Princess
13 (7a)	13 (7a)	Fixing the Shed	Princess; Pirate; Kung-Fu Expert; Explorer
14 (7b)	14 (7b)	The Squeaky Scratchy Secret	Princess; Astronaut; Explorer
15 (8a)	15 (8a)	Pool Monster	Astronaut; Egyptian; Cavewoman; Explorer
16 (8b)	16 (8b)	Martian Mission	Bathing Suit; Acrobat; Astronaut
17 (9a)	17 (9a)	Movie Night	Photographer; Submarine; Arctic Explorer; Explorer
18 (9b)	18 (9b)	Birdhouse	Mermaid; Pilot; Farmer; Explorer
19 (10a)	19 (10a)	Extreme X-Ray	Astronaut; Cowgirl; Ringmaster
20 (10b)	20 (10b)	Ant Antics	Hula Dancer; Superhero; Princess; Detective; Miner
21 (11a)	21 (11a)	Salad Days	Cowgirl; Trench Coat; Astronaut; Cavewoman
22 (11b)	22 (11b)	Paving the Driveway	Explorer; Mermaid; Arctic Explorer; Princess; Sleepwear
23 (12a)	23 (12a)	Poster Perfect	Explorer; Greek; Gymnast
24 (12b)	24 (12b)	Special Delivery	Egyptian; Explorer; Pirate; Arctic Explorer
25 (13a)	25 (13a)	Happy Birthday	Mermaid; Cowgirl; Egyptian; Explorer
26 (13b)	26 (13b)	Yard Sale	Explorer; Astronaut; Greek; Princess

=== Season 2 (Unaired) ===
Episode Number (Overall)	Episode Number	Episode Title	Episode Costume(s)
27 (14a)	1 (1a)	Spooky Shadows	Bathing Suit; Arabian; Mermaid; Cowgirl
28 (14b)	2 (1b)	Freeze Tag	Astronaut; Spy; Arctic Explorer; Diver
29 (15a)	3 (2a)	Dining Out	Farmer; Chef; Ringmaster; Mermaid
30 (15b)	4 (2b)	Car Wash	Ballet Dancer; Sheriff; Mermaid; Kung-Fu Expert
31 (16a)	5 (3a)	Mostly Ghostly	Bathing Suit; Greek; Hockey Player; Detective
32 (16b)	6 (3b)	Hide and Seek	Ringmaster; Farmer; Spy; Scout
33 (17a)	7 (4a)	Saltwater Surprise	Photographer; Superhero; Detective; Viking; Mermaid
34 (17b)	8 (4b)	The Secret Ingredient	Submarine; Greek; Kung-Fu Expert; Scientist
35 (18a)	9 (5a)	Future Findings	Disco Dancer; Ringmaster; Astronaut; Farmer
36 (18b)	10 (5b)	A Royal Rescue!	Princess
37 (19a)	11 (6a)	What's That Sound?	Architect; Disco Dancer; Superhero; Explorer
38 (19b)	12 (6b)	Order's Up	Doctor; Chef; Submarine; Architect
39 (20a)	13 (7a)	Finders Sneakers	Greek; Film Director; Cavewoman; Explorer
40 (20b)	14 (7b)	The Pharaoh's Formula	Explorer; Pirate; Gymnast; Egyptian
41 (21a)	15 (8a)	Tasty Trails	Greek; Arctic Explorer; Businesswoman; Robin Hood; Astronaut
42 (21b)	16 (8b)	Mighty Mending	Tuxedo; Chef; Arctic Explorer; Superhero; Cowgirl
43 (22a)	17 (9a)	Great Games	Hula Dancer; Robin Hood; Coach; Kung-Fu Expert
44 (22b)	18 (9b)	Toy Troubles	Robin Hood; Arctic Explorer; Cavewoman; Detective
45 (23a)	19 (10a)	Chop Chop	Acrobat; Scout; Explorer; Scientist
46 (23b)	20 (10b)	Best in Barn	Pilot; Cavewoman; Farmer; Explorer
47 (24a)	21 (11a)	Pearl Pursuit	Firewoman; Submarine; Bathing Suit; Hockey Player
48 (24b)	22 (11b)	Granting Wishes	Chef; Bathing Suit; Scientist; Kung-Fu Expert; Skateboarder
49 (25a)	23 (12a)	Chalking It Up	Explorer; Greek; Scientist; Athlete
50 (25b)	24 (12b)	Toys and Tricks	Pirate; Tracksuit; Explorer; Miner
51 (26a)	25 (13a)	Bunny Blues	Scientist; Robin Hood; Kung-Fu Expert; Doctor
52 (26b)	26 (13b)	Puzzle Pieces	Scientist; Astronaut; Egyptian; Cowgirl

== Reception ==
The series was noted for its educational content. A review describes its style as follows: "The series offers a style influenced by anime, retro graphics and illustrated children's books."
