= The Weathering Continent =

Japanese light novel series

- Cover of Part 24, illustrated by Mutsumi Inomata.

風の大陸 (Kaze no Tairiku)
- Genre: Adventure, Fantasy
- Serial novel
- Written by: Sei Takekawa
- Illustrated by: Mutsumi Inomata
- Published by: Fujimi Shobo
- Magazine: Dragon Magazine
- Original run: April 1990 – 2006
- Volumes: 28 (plus 7 side story volumes)
- Anime film
- Directed by: Kōichi Mashimo
- Written by: Kōichi Mashimo
- Music by: Michiru Oshima
- Studio: I.G. Tatsunoko
- Licensed by: NA: Media Blasters
- Released: July 18, 1992
- Runtime: 54 minutes
- Light novel

Shin Kaze no Tairiku
- Written by: Sei Takekawa
- Illustrated by: Mutsumi Inomata
- Published by: Kadokawa Haruki Corporation
- Original run: November 15, 2010 – March 15, 2011
- Volumes: 2

The Weathering Continent (風の大陸, Kaze no Tairiku) is a Japanese fantasy light novel series written by Sei Takekawa and illustrated by Mutsumi Inomata. The Weathering Continent centers on three travelers – the delicately beautiful sorcerer Tieh, the burly and reticent warrior Bois, and the spritely young Lakshi – as they trek through the shattered wastelands of the ancient continent of Atlantis.

The first installment of the series was published in Monthly Dragon Magazine in April 1988, with a total of 28 collected novels released from November 1990 to April 2006. An anime feature film based on the novels was also released theatrically in Japan in July 1992. It is available in the United States courtesy of Media Blasters. During the novels' original run, several side stories were published. A short, sequel series also followed when the original series ended.

== Media ==
=== Novels ===
The Weathering Continent, serial novels written by Sei Takekawa and illustrated by Mutsumi Inomata, was first serialized in the Fujimi Shobo publication Monthly Dragon Magazine in the April 1990 issue. The series totals 28 collected volumes. The first was released on November 11, 1988, and the last was released on April 20, 2006. The entire The Weathering Continent series was also collected into five larger volumes and published on September 28, 2007.

During the publication of The Weathering Continent, several related stories were issued: The three volume Kaze no Tairiku Gaiden (風の大陸 外伝1; lit. 'The Weathering Continent Side Story'); the three volume Kaze no Tairiku Koori no Shima (風の大陸 氷の島; lit. 'The Weathering Continent: Island of Ice'); and the single volume Kaze no Taikiku Gekkou Nisamayoumono (風の大陸 月光にさまようもの; lit. 'The Weathering Continent: Something to Wander in the Moonlight'). A sequel light novel series, Shin Kaze no Tairiku (新 風の大陸; lit. "The New Weathering Continent), has been published in two volumes by Kadokawa Haruki Corporation from November 2010 to March 2011.

=== Anime film ===
The Weathering Continent anime film was produced by I.G. Tatsunoko (later Production I.G) and released theatrically in Japan on July 18, 1992, as part of a triple bill with The Heroic Legend of Arislan II and Silent Möbius: The Motion Picture 2. It was written and directed by Kōichi Mashimo and features character designs by Nobuteru Yūki and music by Michiru Oshima. The film made its way to VHS in Japan via Bandai on December 16, 1992. It has aired on both the NHK network and the Bandai Channel. The film was localized in the United States by Media Blasters with English voice recordings by NYAV Post. It was released on DVD on July 29, 2003. The film was aired on the Starz network channels throughout 2006.

=== CDs and artbooks ===
A number of audio CDs relating to The Weathering Continent have been published in Japan. An original soundtrack to the anime film, consisting of a total of 25 background and vocal tracks, was released in two volumes by Victor Entertainment on July 18, 1991, and January 21, 1993. The company also released CD singles for the anime's vocal songs by Yui Nishiwaki and Arai Akino.

Three art books based on The Weathering Continent have also been issued: Mutsumi Inomata Paintings Collection The Weathering Continent: Un Ballo en Maschera, Dragon Magazine Collection The Weathering Continent The Approach of Atlantis, and Fujimi Fantasia Comics: The Weathering Continent.

== Reception ==
Brian Hanson of Anime News Network summarized the anime film as "a group of mopey kids on a dying mid-Atlantic continent from long, long ago comment on their bleak lives and their bleak world and how bleak everything is". Raphael See of THEM Anime Reviews called the pace of the plot "a little faster than the diffusion of molasses through a granite wall" and that the key characters constantly reflect on past events.
