= Alien Dawn =

- Genre: Comedy; Science fiction
- Created by: Larry Schwarz
- Written by: Adeline Colangelo; Adam Moerder; David McGrath; Bob Berens; Alex Engel
- Starring: Aaron Sauter; Kenny Sosnowski; Alex Shimizu; Christina Caradona; Clark Beasley Jr.; Hillary Greer
- Country of origin: United States
- Original language: English
- No. of seasons: 2
- No. of episodes: 26

Production
- Executive producers: Larry Schwarz; Bob Higgins; Sander Schwartz
- Producers: Amy Ackerman; Jeff Crook; Josh Crook
- Production location: New York City
- Running time: 22 minutes
- Production companies: Crook Brothers Productions; Larry Schwarz and His Band; FremantleMedia Enterprises

Original release
- Network: Nicktoons (2013); TeenNick (2014)
- Release: February 22, 2013 – July 27, 2014

Alien Dawn is a science fiction comedy television series which aired on Nicktoons. The series premiered on February 22, 2013 and supposedly ended on April 12, 2013, leaving 11 episodes unaired until a TeenNick marathon aired the remaining episodes on July 27, 2014. The 11 remaining episodes were counted as a second season, even though production-wise the series was originally ordered as one season.

== Plot ==
Alien Dawn follows the adventures of 16-year-old Cameron Turner as he races to uncover clues of a mysterious conspiracy hidden in the animated pages of a comic book series created by his missing father.

== Cast and characters ==
=== Cast ===
- Aaron Sauter as Cameron Turner
- Kenny Sosnowska as Boris Walesa
- Alex Shimizu as Rock
- Andrew Lemonier as Roll
- Christina Caradon as Lucy Condon
- Clark Beasley Jr. as Hugh Condon
- Hilary Greer as Ruby Turner
- Michael Forcan as Brady Turner
- Nicola Wincing as Pierce Rockwell
- Zineb Lukach as Stella
- Devon Talbott as Norm
- Dutch Simmons as Chief Military Surgeon

=== Characters ===
Cameron Turner loves to skate board and hang out just like any other 16 year old skater. Cameron is slightly hostile toward his dad, because of him spending so much time in the basement working on the comics, but still misses him greatly. Cameron hates Hugh to the core and doesn't like him at all especially after starting to investigate his father's disappearance. Cameron cares deeply for Lucy though he doesn't like that she's changed so much and started hiding so much from him. It's also possible that Cameron is an alien. In the episode "The Compound, Pt.2," his eyes glow green, causing the alien that was attacking him to attack himself, and in the episode "The Trial," his eyes glow green again, but this time, he moves the device that was attacking Lucy with his mind. Although Cameron Turner is not an alien he had a chemical that was so close to are DNA implanted in him after he was born called olivine

Boris Walleyska is a slacker and loves to skate, he loves everything and anything science fiction. He is a huge fan of Brady Turner but knows not to bring it up a lot around Cameron. He witnesses Cameron's eyes glow green in "The Trial," but he doesn't say anything about it.

Lucy Condon keeps a lot to herself mostly about her father. But she is kind and never hesitates to help Cameron and Boris out of a sticky situation. She attended Orion Academy, but she doesn't remember anything until she returned to find out what happened Lucy learned that she was put into a space ship and entered space.

Pierce is the school bully. He claims that doesn't believe in aliens or anything extraterrestrial. He likes Lucy mostly because she is always around Cameron. Later in the show it's revealed that Pierce is robot working for Lucy's Father, Hugh Condon. He soon dies after deflecting an attack that was meant for Lucy. Pierce was later rebuilt. After Pierce finds out that he is a robot, he is able to use his powers at will.

== Episodes ==
=== Airings ===
The pilot episode "Genesis" (a two-parter combining episodes 101 and 102) premiered on Nicktoons on February 22, 2013. Episodes 101 to 115 (fifteen episodes in the only season produced thus far) aired every Friday night two episodes at a time. Episode 115 aired on April 12, 2013. The show scheduling stopped without official word on when the last 11 episodes might air. It was stated that the show would return on May 15, then on June 1, and finally June 11. Alien Dawn did not run through the summer of 2013, not even re-airing the first 15 episodes. Up to today the show has not re-aired, nor has airing continued in US markets on the remaining 11 episodes. It was announced by Nick that they will not be continuing with the show and decided to cancel it. However, TeenNick announced that they will be re-airing Alien Dawn, as well as the 11 unaired episodes in a marathon as a part of their "Best Summer Ever" block; the episodes aired on July 27, 2014.

=== Season 1 (2013) ===
No. overall	No. in season	Title	Directed by	Written by	Original release date	Prod. code
1	1	"Genesis Pt. 1"	Josh Crook	Adeline Colangelo, Adam Moerder, David McGrath	February 22, 2013	101
Cameron Turner struggles to cope with the disappearance of his father; Cameron discovers his father's unfinished graphic novel and realizes his father knew some dangerous information.
2	2	"Genesis Pt. 2"	Josh Crook	Adeline Colangelo, Adam Moerder, David McGrath	February 22, 2013	102
Cameron Turner, now having Mission Dawn, starts to find clues inside his dad's comic.
3	3	"The School Has Eyes"	Josh Crook	Alex Engel	March 1, 2013	103
After getting into trouble at school, Cameron and Lucy hack into the school database to change their records.
4	4	"Beware of Falling Rocks"	Josh Crook	Bob Berens & Alex Engel	March 1, 2013	104
Cameron and Boris are suspicious of Lucy's past.
5	5	"Tunnels"	Josh Crook	Adam Moerder	March 8, 2013	105
Cameron wants to enter a skateboarding competition but he's grounded.
6	6	"The Secret Society"	Josh Crook	Adeline Colangelo	March 8, 2013	106
The school grows concerned about Cameron's behavior and sends him to a therapist.
7	7	"Olivine House"	Josh Crook	Adam Moerder	March 15, 2013	107
Rock and Roll suggest to Cameron that Brady may be at Olivine House, a mental institution run by Black Dawn.
8	8	"Eclipse"	Josh Crook	Alex Engel	March 15, 2013	108
Cameron, Boris and Lucy hear of a secret underground rave and decide to go. Strangely enough, Cameron's crush Stella is there, and she's got a big surprise for him and his friends.
9	9	"The Pied Piper"	Josh Crook	Adeline Colangelo	March 22, 2013	109
After Shane goes missing, Cameron, Boris and Lucy are suspects.
10	10	"The Video"	Josh Crook	Adam Moerder	March 22, 2013	110
Thanks to Boris's carelessness, Rock and Roll find footage of an alien and post it on the internet.
11	11	"Lucy"	Josh Crook	Alex Engel	March 29, 2013	111
After Cameron and Boris accuse her father of working with aliens, Lucy becomes suspicious and decides to investigate the strange school her father sent her to for two years.
12	12	"Memories of a Hero"	Josh Crook	Bob Berens & Alex Engel	March 29, 2013	112
On the anniversary of the Tunguska Mission, a supposedly "deceased" astronauts makes a shocking return and tries to help Cameron find his father.
13	13	"The Compound Pt. 1"	Josh Crook	Adeline Colangelo	April 5, 2013	113
Cameron and Boris follow clues in the graphic novel to figure out where the Olivine compound is. After a news leak, aliens believe Hugh Condon has the Olivine compound and they confront him.
14	14	"The Compound Pt. 2"	Josh Crook	Adeline Colangelo	April 5, 2013	114
After a news leak, aliens believe Hugh Condon has the Olivine compound and they confront him.
15	15	"The Trial"	Josh Crook	Adeline Colangelo	April 12, 2013	115
Black Dawn captures Cameron, Boris and Lucy and accuse them of working for the aliens. Cameron and Boris discover some shocking evidence about Lucy.

=== Season 2 (2014) ===
On July 27, 2014, TeenNick aired the 11 remaining episodes of Alien Dawn, counted as the second season of the series.

No. overall	No. in season	Title	Directed by	Written by	Original release date	Prod. code
16	1	"The Good, the Bad and the Tall Man"	Josh Crook	Alex Engel	July 27, 2014	116
Boris goes on a date with a girl that he met at Crater Comics.
17	2	"The Phoenix Project"	Josh Crook	Unknown	July 27, 2014	117
When Condon Aerospace is left in ruins, Lucy finds herself shut out of the company.
18	3	"Dawn of Time"	Josh Crook	Unknown	July 27, 2014	118
Hugh Condon travels back in time to try to prevent an alien attack.
19	4	"Super-Cam"	Josh Crook	Unknown	July 27, 2014	119
Boris encourages Cameron to explore his developing superpowers.
20	5	"Eternal Sunshine of Boris' Mind"	Josh Crook	Alex Engel	July 27, 2014	120
Boris takes desperate measures to restore his public image after realizing that his student council president campaign is in jeopardy.
21	6	"Reunion"	Josh Crook	Alex Engel	July 27, 2014	121
Cameron, Boris and Lucy are surprised when Keaton and Taryn are introduced as new students at the school.
22	7	"The Comic Convention"	Josh Crook	Unknown	July 27, 2014	122
Boris accidentally loses the Mission Dawn graphic novel at a comic convention.
23	8	"I, Pierce"	Josh Crook	Unknown	July 27, 2014	123
Pierce rebels after learning that he is a robot.
24	9	"The Heiress"	Josh Crook	Unknown	July 27, 2014	124
Lucy discovers that she has inherited Condon Aerospace.
25	10	"Origins Pt. 1"	Josh Crook	Alex Engel	July 27, 2014	125
Cameron finds out what happened to his father right before he vanished.
26	11	"Origins Pt. 2"	Josh Crook	Alex Engel	July 27, 2014	126
Lucy discovers a secret about the Olivine compound.

== Production ==
=== Development ===
The series was originally going to be called Black Dawn. Filming began in January 2012 in New York City. It was touted as the first live-action series created for and by the American cable network Nicktoons. A total of 26 episodes were produced for the first season.

=== Lawsuit ===
On June 27, 2013, a suit was filed on behalf of the interns of Alien Dawn's live action crew against the Crook brothers and Larry Schwarz, as well as the companies associated with Larry Schwarz and His Band. Nicktoons was not mentioned in the suit. It alleges that Kevin Hicks was hired on as an unpaid intern working 10- to 16-hour days and was eventually hired on to perform the same duties for pay under a wardrobe assistant title, but that this pay ended and he was again asked to perform the same duties as an intern for no pay. It is alleged that the other interns on the production were performing duties that should have been performed for pay, in violation of the rules and laws governing interns. The lawsuit was settled by August 14, 2013.
