= Animation Collective =

American independent internet and television animation studio

- Type: Subsidiary
- Industry: Entertainment
- Genre: Animation
- Predecessor: Rumpus Toys
- Founded: 2003; 23 years ago
- Founder: Larry Schwarz
- Defunct: 2014; 12 years ago
- Headquarters: New York City, New York, USA
- Area served: Worldwide
- Key people: Larry Schwarz; Sean Lahey; Christopher Fauci
- Products: Kappa Mikey; Dancing Sushi; Thumb Wrestling Federation; Leader Dog; Tortellini Western; Three Delivery; Speed Racer: The Next Generation; Ellen's Acres; HTDT; Princess Natasha; Thumb Wrestling Federation
- Production output: Animation
- Number of employees: 168 (2008)
- Parent: Handmade Films (2009–2017)
- Divisions: Animation Collective Software

Animation Collective was an American independent internet and television animation studio based in New York City, best known for its internet and television series using Adobe Flash, Maya and other software.

Founded and owned by Larry Schwarz in 2003, Animation Collective produced Kappa Mikey (and its spin-off Dancing Sushi), Thumb Wrestling Federation, Leader Dog, Tortellini Western, Three Delivery, and Speed Racer: The Next Generation for Nicktoons Network, Ellen's Acres, HTDT, and Princess Natasha for Cartoon Network, and SKWOD, Kung Fu Academy, & Chubby Butter for AOL.

In addition, Schwarz served as producer of Wulin Warriors for Cartoon Network and the first season of The Incredible Crash Dummies for the FoxBox. Animation Collective was also the leading multi-platform content provider for kids and teens to America Online.

In October 2009, the studio was bought out by HandMade Films, the company that produced such films as Monty Python's Life of Brian, Time Bandits, Nuns on the Run, and Lock, Stock and Two Smoking Barrels, as well as the animated Planet 51. It continued to produce content under their company. They were offering bids for the proposed series Jolly Rabbit and HTDT.

In September 2011, FremantleMedia acquired the worldwide sales and distribution rights to Animation Collective's library. In October 2017, Schwarz bought Animation Collective back from HandMade Films. In September 2018, CAKE acquired the distribution rights to Animation Collective.

The following year, Schwarz and others in the administrative office changed the studio's name to Larry Schwarz And His Band, as a way to start fresh. This effectively ended Animation Collective's run by name, although all the same employees still worked in the same office. The rights for the pitches and pilots for Jolly Rabbit and HTDT were transferred under the new title, as well as new shows Team Toon and Alien Dawn. HTDT was later sold to Toonz Entertainment, who delivered the series in 2015.

== Original series ==
- Chubby Butter (for AOL)
- Dancing Sushi (Kappa Mikey spin-off for Nicktoons)
- Ellen's Acres (for Cartoon Network)
- Kappa Mikey (for Nicktoons)
- Kung Fu Academy (for AOL)
- Leader Dog (for Nicktoons)
- Princess Natasha (for AOL and Cartoon Network)
- SKWOD (for AOL)
- Three Delivery (for Nicktoons)
- Thumb Wrestling Federation (for Nicktoons/Cartoon Network) (live-action)
- Tortellini Western (for Nicktoons)
- Wulin Warriors (for Cartoon Network) (puppet) (English dub)

== Commissioned series ==
- The Cheesy Adventures of Captain Mac A. Roni (DVD release of pilot for Daystar Television Network)
- The Incredible Crash Dummies (for FoxBox)
- FoxBox website
- Johnson and Johnson 'Touching Bond' webisodes
- Speed Racer: The Next Generation (for Nicktoons)
- Speed Racer: The Next Generation Season 2 (for Nicktoons), with Toonz Entertainment
- Kidz Bop Comic Adventures (for Razor & Tie)

== Canceled ==
- Eloise in Africa (for HandMade Films)
- HTDT (unaired test pilot)
- Jolly Rabbit (for BBC Three, Disney)

== Under Larry Schwarz and His Band ==
- Team Toon (originally for Cartoon Network Europe but ended up airing on Pop Max and Netflix)
- Alien Dawn (for Nicktoons)
