= Demon Fighter Kocho =

Japanese manga series by Nonki Miyasu

- First tankōbon volume cover

厄災仔寵 (Yakusai Kochō)
- Genre: Comedy, supernatural
- Manga
- Written by: Nonki Miyasu
- Published by: Shueisha
- Magazine: Weekly Young Jump
- Original run: 1995 – 1997
- Volumes: 4
- Live-action film

Yakusai Kochō: Shinigami-tachi no Wana
- Directed by: Katsuji Kanazawa
- Released: April 25, 1997
- Runtime: 71 minutes
- Original video animation
- Directed by: Toru Yoshida
- Written by: Hiroshi Toda
- Music by: Toshihiko Sahashi
- Studio: Anime R
- Licensed by: NA: Media Blasters
- Released: May 21, 1997
- Runtime: 35 minutes
- Live-action film

Yakusai Kochō 2: Akureitachi no Gakuen-hen
- Directed by: Katsuji Kanazawa
- Released: October 2, 1997
- Runtime: 75 minutes
- icon

Demon Fighter Kocho (Japanese: 厄災仔寵, Hepburn: Yakusai Kochō; lit. 'Calamity Kochō') is a Japanese manga series written and illustrated by Nonki Miyasu. It was published in Shueisha's seinen manga magazine Weekly Young Jump from 1995 to 1997, with its chapters collected in four tankōbon volumes. It was adapted into two live-action films and an original video animation (OVA) in 1997. The OVA was released on DVD by Media Blasters in North America in 2000.

== Media ==
=== Manga ===
Written and illustrated by Nonki Miyasu, Demon Fighter Kocho was published on a monthly basis in Shueisha's seinen manga magazine Weekly Young Jump from 1995 to 1997. Shueisha collected its chapters in four tankōbon volumes, released from September 1995 to October 1997.

=== Live-action films ===
Two live-action films, subtitled Shinigami-tachi no Wana (死神たちの罠; lit. 'Grim Reapers' Trap') and Akureitachi no Gakuen-hen (悪霊たちの学園篇; lit. 'School of Evil Spirits'), were released on April 25 and October 2, 1997, respectively.

=== Original video animation ===
An original video animation (OVA) adaptation animated by Anime R, directed Toru Yoshida, with scripts by Hiroshi Toda, was released on May 21, 1997.

In North America, the OVA was licensed by Media Blasters. It was released on December 19, 2000.

== Reception ==
Chris Beveridge of AnimeOnDVD.com offered a mixed review of the OVA. While he suggested the single episode might have worked better as part of a Media Blasters anthology, he acknowledged that the dubbed extras helped compensate. As for the show itself, he noted its appeal to viewers seeking heavy fan service without crossing into hentai, remarking: "There's plenty of fan service and nakedness throughout that will satisfy those who aren't brave enough to just buy hentai[,] but just feel wrong looking at the Rayearth girls in that way."
