= Mia and the Migoo =

2008 French-Italian animated film by Jacques-Rémy Girerd

- French theatrical release poster
- Directed by: Jacques-Rémy Girerd
- Written by: Jacques-Rémy Girerd; Antoine Lanciaux; Youri Tcherenkov; Benoît Chieux
- Produced by: Eric Beckman; David Jesteadt
- Starring: Garance Lagraa; Laurent Gamelon; Dany Boon; Yolande Moreau; Pierre Richard; Miou-Miou
- Edited by: Hervé Guichard
- Music by: Serge Besset
- Production company: Folimage
- Distributed by: Gébéka Films
- Release date: 10 December 2008
- Running time: 91 minutes
- Countries: France; Italy
- Language: French
- Budget: $9.4 million
- Box office: $4.5 million

Mia and the Migoo (French: Mia et le Migou, Italian: Mià e il Migù) is a 2008 French-Italian animated film produced by Folimage and directed by Jacques-Rémy Girerd. The film is about a young girl's search for her father in a tropical paradise, threatened by the construction of a gigantic hotel resort. The English version stars the voices of Whoopi Goldberg, Matthew Modine, Wallace Shawn, James Woods, John DiMaggio, and Amanda Misquez. The film won the European Film Award for Best Animated Feature at the 22nd European Film Awards. The English version of the film was given a limited release in the United States on 27 March 2011 and opened to generally mixed critical reviews.

== Synopsis ==
At a remote construction site in Latin America, an American developer named Jekhide attempts to build a resort, however, the site is attacked by a mysterious force, causing several workers to get trapped underground. One of the worker's daughters Mia has a premonition. So after saying a few words of parting at her mother's grave, she sets out on a journey across mountains and jungles to search for her father. She goes to a witch who shows her the way and, along the way, she meets and befriends a tribe of giant ape-like creatures called the Migoos.

== Cast ==
- Garance Lagraa (French) / Amanda Misquez (English) as Mia, a brave, pretty, kind, and carefree eight-year-old girl who leaves her home to find her father. She has kept her mom's good luck charms that can protect her from any danger. She is the film's main protagonist.
- Laurent Gamelon (French) / John DiMaggio (English) as Jekhide, a greedy businessman and is Aldrin's father, although, he barely cares about him due to his busy schedule and focusing on his plan. His plan is to take over the tropical island and build a hotel in the middle of the river. He is the film's main antagonist.
- Charlie Girerd (French) / Vincent Angello (English) as Aldrin, a cheery, kind yet lonely boy, who is a son of Jekhide. He misses his mother, who is in an Antarctica, he wants to spend time with his dad who barely pays attention to him. He is befriended by Mia.
- Dany Boon (French) / Wallace Shawn (English) as the Migoos, a group of friendly ape-like creatures who befriends with Mia, where they save her from falling off the cliff without her mom's good luck charms. They sometimes say Mia's name wrong whenever they hear a noun. They sometimes get into a fight and don't get along very well. The Migoos also tried their best to protect their tree from any harm, otherwise, they would get harmed as well.
- Yolande Moreau (French) / Whoopi Goldberg (English) as the Sorceress. She cuts off most of Mia's hair for her fire to help Mia find her father.
- Pierre Richard (French) / Jesse Corti (English) as Pedro, Mia's father and worker at the construction site where Jekhide is building the hotel. Corti also voices Wilford in the English dub.
- Matthew Modine as Mr. Houston / Godfrey
- James Woods as Jojo-la-Frite
- Miou-Miou (French) / Veronica Taylor (English) as Juliette

== Release ==
This film opened in France on 10 December 2008. It later premiered at the New York International Children's Film Festival on 27 February 2009 and the U.S. premiere was held in New York City on 25 March 2011.

The film was released on DVD by Entertainment One in North America on 7 August 2012.

== Box office ==
The English-language version of the film had a limited release on 22 April 2011, only earning $16,975.

== Reception ==
While the French release was received favorably, the U.S. version received generally mixed reviews, with criticism focused on the film's crude humor and dark elements, while some praise was focused on the animation. This film has a 38% rating on the film critics aggregate site Rotten Tomatoes, based on 16 reviews, with an average rating of 5.1/10.

Kyle Smith of the New York Post gave this film 1 out of 4 stars and said that Mia and the Migoo is far too childish to intrigue adults yet too slow and dull for kids.

Shawn Levy of The Oregonian gave this film a C− and wrote, "It's lovely, truly, but so heavy-handed and slipshod that it's probably best enjoyed with the sound off—an option they're not likely to offer at the movie theater".

On the positive side, Manohla Dargis of The New York Times gave this film 3 of 5 stars and said that "trying to parse meaning in Mia is secondary to its main point, which is its look, created with 500,000 hand-drawn frames".
