= Speed Racer: The Next Generation =

Animated television series

- Created by: Larry Schwarz
- Based on: Speed Racer by Tatsuo Yoshida
- Written by: Ben Gruber; Adeline Colangelo; Justin Gray; Jimmy Palmiotti; Gerry Duggan; Marv Wolfman; Allan Neuwirth; Susan Kim; Aaron Bergeron; Daniel Schofield; Mike Yank; Walt Gardner; James Harvey; David McGrath; Adam Moerder; Eric J. Dannenberg
- Directed by: Stephen Moverley (pilot episode); John Holt (season 1); Jay Surridge (season 2)
- Voices of: Kurt Csolak; Robbie Sublett (season 1); Bryan Fenkart (season 2); Sahra Mellesse; Carter Jackson; Peter Fernandez (season 1); Greg Abbey (season 2); David Skigen; Michal Friedman; Michael Sinterniklaas; David Zen Mansley; Cindy Robinson
- Opening theme: "Go Speed Racer Go!", rearranged by John Angier
- Ending theme: "Go Speed Racer Go!" (instrumental)
- Composers: John Angier (season 1); Guy Dagul (season 2)
- Countries of origin: United States; Canada; Ireland (season 2); India (season 2)
- No. of seasons: 2
- No. of episodes: 52 (list of episodes)

Production
- Executive producers: Larry Schwarz; James Rocknowski; John Rocknowski; Ken Katsumoto; Sergei Aniskov; Doug MacLennon; Brian Gilmore; Ethan Gilmore; Kazumi Fujita (season 1); Sean Lahey (season 1); Christopher Fauci (season 1); Michael Gold (season 1); Karine Martin (season 2); Paul Cummins (season 2); John Cummings (season 2); James Fry (season 2); P. Jayakumar (season 2); Jason Netter (season 2); Loris Kramer Lunsford (season 2)
- Producers: David McGrath (pilot episode); Amy Ackerman (season 1); Susan Cobin (season 2); Rathan Sam George (season 2); Michael Cisneros (season 2)
- Running time: 22 minutes
- Production companies: Speed Racer Enterprises; Animation Collective; (season 1); Colliseascope Studios (season 1); Nickelodeon (season 1); Kickstart Productions (season 2); Telegael (season 2); Toonz Entertainment (season 2); Lionsgate Television

Original release
- Network: Nicktoons
- Release: May 2, 2008 – August 25, 2013

Related
- Speed Racer; Speed Racer X

Speed Racer: The Next Generation is an American animated television series based on the classic Japanese Speed Racer franchise, in which the internal events take place decades after those in the 1967 Japanese series. It is the fourth television adaptation of the franchise, and is executive produced by Lionsgate Entertainment, Larry Schwarz, Ken Katsumoto, and Speed Racer Enterprises. The first season was produced by Animation Collective, while the Flash character animation for it was handled by the now-defunct Collideascope Studios as their last project. For the second season both Telegael and Kickstart Productions produced it, while the flash character animation was handled by Toonz Entertainment. It aired on Nicktoons from May 2, 2008, to August 25, 2013. This series was partly made to promote the live-action film.

== Premise ==
The series follows the adventures of an orphan teenager named Speed who dreams of being a famed car racer like the one he is named after. He takes a bus to the elite Racing Academy, founded by the Racer family, and soon experiences the difficulties of fitting in and competing with X, the best racer/student in the school, and Speed Racer's son.

== Episodes ==
Season	Episodes	Originally released	
Season	Episodes	First released	Last released
1	26	May 2, 2008	July 5, 2009
2	26	March 24, 2011	August 25, 2013

== Comic book miniseries ==
Speed Racer: The Next Generation Birthright was a four-issue miniseries published by IDW Publishing. It ran from November 2008 to February 2009.
