= Negadon: The Monster from Mars =

2005 Japanese film

惑星大怪獣ネガドン (Wakusei Daikaijû Negadon)
- Genre: Science fiction, Tokusatsu
- Anime television film
- Directed by: Jun Awazu
- Produced by: Kazuki Sunami
- Written by: Jun Awazu
- Music by: Shingo Terasawa
- Studio: Studio Magara, ComMix Wave Inc.
- Licensed by: NA: Central Park Media
- Original network: Animax
- English network: Sci Fi, AZN Television
- Released: October 16, 2005
- Runtime: 25 minutes

Negadon: The Monster from Mars (惑星大怪獣ネガドン, Wakusei Daikaijû Negadon; literally Great Planet Monster Negadon) is a 25-minute computer animated Japanese kaiju short film completed in 2005 (production started in 2003). Written and directed by Jun Awazu with his independent company Studio Magara co-produced with CoMix Wave Films, the film attempts to capture the look and feel of Showa era Japanese special effects films, mainly from the 1950s and early '60s. Negadon has been broadcast across Japan by the anime satellite television network, Animax. The film premiered on AZN Television in North America. The film has also played by the Sci-Fi Channel in the United States in 2008. Negadon, the Monster from Mars (2005) was released in North America on DVD on July 11, 2006, by Central Park Media.

== Plot ==
In the year 2025, Earth sends an expedition to Mars in the spaceship Izanami. A huge rock formation is discovered beneath the surface, and is transported back to earth. On the way back, the rock's temperature soars, causing the Izanami to explode and crash-land in Tokyo, leaving a large crater. The rock hatches into a colossal alien life form, which proceeds to attack Japan with bolts of energy from its many appendages and orifices. Missiles, tanks, and aircraft all attack but fail to destroy Negadon (the name of the creature, although it is never stated on screen), whose thick exoskeleton protects it from conventional weaponry.

At the same time, Ryuuichi Narasaki, a downcast robotics constructor, is still devastated by the incident that cost him his left eye and the life of his only child, a young daughter. The incident was caused by the malfunctioning of his masterpiece, the giant prototype super-robot MI-6 2 Miroku. Because of the ominous threat of Negadon, Narasaki faces the painful choice of reactivating (and piloting) Miroku to destroy Negadon and save the world. After an epic battle, Narasaki (in Miroku) hauls Negadon into the upper atmosphere and destroys the space creature. His mission accomplished, Narasaki allows himself and Miroku to die when Negadon explodes.

== Cast ==
Negadon: The Monster From Mars cast
Role	Japanese	English
Role	Japanese	TripWire Productions (2006)
Ryuuichi Narasaki	Dai Shimizu	Sean Schemmel
Announcer	Masafumi Kishi	Marc Thompson
Seiji Yoshizawa	Takafumi Sasahara	Jay Snyder
Emi Narasaki	Akane Yumoto	Kether Donohue

== See also ==
- List of animated feature films
