= List of superhero television series =

The following is a list of superhero television series.

== DC and Marvel ==
Because so many DC and Marvel comic books based on superheroes have been adapted into television series, they have separate entries:

- List of television series based on DC Comics publications
- List of unproduced DC Comics projects
- List of television series based on Marvel Comics publications
- List of unproduced television projects based on Marvel Comics

== Toei Company ==
Japan's Toei Company has also produced numerous tokusatsu superhero television shows, listed in the following article:

- List of superhero productions created by Toei

== Independents ==
Independent companies also produced a few superhero television shows aside from DC, Marvel and Toei, listed in the following articles:

- List of television series and films based on Archie Comics publications
- List of television series and films based on Boom! Studios publications
- List of television series and films based on Dark Horse Comics publications
- List of unproduced Dark Horse Comics projects
- List of television series and films based on Harvey Comics publications
- List of television series and films based on IDW Publishing publications
- List of television series and films based on Image Comics publications
- List of unproduced Image Comics projects
- List of television series and films based on Oni Press publications
- List of TV series based on French-language comics
- List of television series based on comic strips
- List of American superhero TV shows

== Miscellaneous live-action ==
This table does not list TV series based on properties owned by DC Comics, Marvel Comics, etc.

Title	Year(s)	Publisher	Network	Notes
The Lone Ranger	1949–1957	WXYT (AM)	ABC	Based on the radio show The Lone Ranger.
Captain Video and His Video Rangers	1949–1955	Original	DuMont	
Buck Rogers	1950–1951	Amazing Stories	ABC	Series based on the space opera by Phillip Francis Nowlan.
Dick Tracy	1950–1951	Detroit Mirror	ABC	Series based on the comic strip by Chester Gould.
Captain Z-Ro	1951–1956	Original	KRON-TV	
Terry and the Pirates	1953	Tribune Media Services	Syndication	Series based on the comic strip Terry and the Pirates by Milton Caniff.
Flash Gordon	1954–1955	King Features Syndicate	DuMont	Series based on the comic strip Flash Gordon by Alex Raymond.
Captain Midnight	1954–1956	Dancer Fitzgerald Sample	CBS	Series based on the radio show.
Sheena, Queen of the Jungle	1955–1956	Fiction House	Syndication	Series based on the comic book by Will Eisner and Jerry Iger.
Zorro	1957–1959	Argosy	ABC	Produced by Walt Disney Productions.
Planet Prince	1958–1959	Original	NTV	
The Invisible Man	1958–1959	C. Arthur Pearson	ITV	
Moonlight Mask	1958–1959	Original	TBS	
Mighty Atom	1959–1960	Kobunsha	MBS	Adaptation of the manga series Astro Boy.
Steve Canyon	1958–1959	King Features Syndicate	NBC	Series based on the comic strip Steve Canyon by Milton Caniff.
Tetsujin 28-go	1960	Kobunsha	NTV	Series based on the manga by Mitsuteru Yokoyama.
The Avengers	1961–1969	Original	ITV	Series unrelated to Marvel's comic book The Avengers.
The Saint	1962–1969	Ward Lock & Co	ITV	Series based on the books by Leslie Charteris.
Doctor Who	1963–present	Original	BBC One	
Get Smart	1965–1970	Original	NBC/CBS	
The Green Hornet	1966–1967	Gold Key Comics	ABC	Produced by 20th Century Fox Television.
Ultra Series	1966–present	Original	TBS	
Tarzan	1966–1968	A.C. McClurg	NBC	
The Space Giants	1966–1967	Shonen	Fuji TV	Series based on the manga by Osamu Tezuka.
Adam Adamant Lives!	1966–1967	Original	BBC One	
The Girl from U.N.C.L.E.	1966–1967	Original	NBC	Spin-off of The Man from U.N.C.L.E..
Star Trek	1966–1968	Original	NBC	
Captain Nice	1967	Original	NBC	
Mr. Terrific	1967	Original	CBS	
He & She	1967–1968	Original	CBS	
Akakage	1967–1968	Original	KTV	
The Mod Squad	1968–1973	Original	ABC	
Land of the Giants	1968–1970	Original	ABC	
The Champions	1969	Original	ITV	
Kamen Rider Series	1971–present	Original	MBS	
Spectreman	1971–1972	Original	Fuji TV	
Mirrorman	1971–1972	Original	Fuji TV	
Kung Fu	1972–1975	Original	ABC	
Android Kikaider	1972–1973	Original	TV Asahi	
Iron King	1972–1973	Original	TBS	
The Six Million Dollar Man	1973–1978	Original	ABC	Produced by Universal Television,.
El Chapulín Colorado	1973–1979	Original	Las Estrellas	
The Tomorrow People	1973–1979	Original	ITV	
Fireman	1973	Original	NTV	
Inazuman	1973–1974	Original	TV Asahi	
Super Robot Red Baron	1973–1974	Original	NTV	
Kikaider 01	1973–1974	Original	TV Asahi	Sequel to Android Kikaider.
Zone Fighter	1973	Original	NTV	
Super Sentai	1975–present	Original	TV Asahi	
The Invisible Man	1975–1976	C. Arthur Pearson	NBC	Series based on the novel The Invisible Man by H. G. Wells.
Holmes & Yoyo	1976–1977	Original	ABC	
Charlie's Angels	1976–1981	Original	ABC	
The Bionic Woman	1976–1978	Original	ABC	Spin-off of The Six Million Dollar Man.
Electra Woman and Dyna Girl'	1976–1977	Original	ABC	Part of The Krofft Supershow.
Monster Squad	1976–1977	Original	NBC	Superheroes based on the Universal Monsters.
The Kids From C.A.P.E.R.	1976–1977	Original	NBC	
Wonderbug	1976–1978	Original	ABC	Segment of The Krofft Supershow.
The New Avengers	1976–1977	Original	ITV	Sequel to The Avengers.
Gemini Man	1976	C. Arthur Pearson	NBC	Series based on the book The Invisible Man.
Man from Atlantis	1977–1978	Original	NBC	
Bigfoot and Wildboy	1977–1979	Original	ABC	Part of The Krofft Supershow.
Ganbaron	1977	Original	Syndication	Series loosely inspired by Superman.
Exo-Man	1977	Original	NBC	
Jason of Star Command	1978–1980	Original	CBS	Part of Tarzan and the Super 7.
Dinosaur Corps Koseidon	1978–1979	Original	Syndication	
Space Ironman Kyodain	1978	Original	Syndication	
Monkey	1978–1980	Wu Cheng'en	Nippon TV	Series based on the novel Journey to the West.
Buck Rogers in the 25th Century	1979–1981	Amazing Stories	NBC	Series based on the space opera by Phillip Francis Nowlan.
Megaloman	1979	Original	Fuji TV	
The Greatest American Hero	1981–1983	Original	ABC	
Metal Hero Series	1982–1999	Original	TV Asahi	
Knight Rider	1982–1986	Original	NBC	
The Powers of Matthew Star	1982–1983	Original	NBC	
The Phoenix	1982	Original	ABC	
Manimal	1983	Original	NBC	
Automan	1983–1984	Original	ABC	
Zorro and Son	1983	Argosy	CBS	
The A-Team	1983–1987	Original	NBC	
Highway to Heaven	1984–1989	Original	NBC	
Going Bananas	1984	Original	NBC	
Airwolf	1984–1987	Original	CBS	
The Master	1984	Original	ABC	
Blue Thunder	1984	Original	ABC	Series based on the film Blue Thunder.
Robin of Sherwood	1984–1986	William Langland	ITV	Series based on the legend of Robin Hood.
Misfits of Science	1985–1986	Original	NBC	
Street Hawk	1985	Original	ABC	
Super Gran	1985–1987	DC Thomson	ITV	
MacGyver	1985–1992	Original	ABC	
The Equalizer	1985–1989	Original	CBS	
Stingray	1985–1987	Original	NBC	
Photon	1986	Original	Syndication	Series based on the laser tag game Photon: The Ultimate Game on Planet Earth.
Journey to the West	1986	Wu Cheng'en	CCTV	Series based on the novel.
Captain Power and the Soldiers of the Future	1987–1988	Original	Syndication	
Sable	1987–1988	First Comics	ABC	
Once a Hero	1987	Original	ABC	
Beauty and the Beast	1987–1990	Original	CBS	
Werewolf	1987–1988	Original	Fox	
The Highwayman	1987–1988	Original	NBC	
Star Trek: The Next Generation	1987–1994	Original	Syndication	Part of the Star Trek franchise.
My Secret Identity	1988–1991	Original	CTV	
Baywatch	1989–2001	Original	NBC	
Quantum Leap	1989–1993	Original	NBC	
Valentina	1989	linus	Italia 1	Series based on the Valentina comic series by Guido Crepax.
Mario Bros. Plumbing	1989	Nintendo	Syndication	Live-action segment of The Super Mario Bros. Super Show!
Super Force	1990–1992	Original	Syndication	
Zorro	1990–1993	Argosy	The Family Channel	
She-Wolf of London	1990–1991	Original	Syndication	
The Adventures of Pete & Pete	1991–1996	Original	Nickelodeon	
Tarzan	1991–1994	A.C. McClurg	TF1	
Dark Justice	1991–1993	Original	CBS	
Highlander: The Series	1992–1998	Original	Syndication	Based on the film Highlander.
The Tomorrow People	1992–1995	Original	ITV	Reboot of The Tomorrow People.
Forever Knight	1992–1996	Original	CBS	Based on the Nick Night film.
Raven	1992–1993	Original	CBS	
Mann & Machine	1992	Original	NBC	
The Young Indiana Jones Chronicles	1992–1993	Original	ABC	Part of the Indiana Jones franchise.
Power Rangers	1993–2023	Original	TeenNick	Contains footage of Super Sentai.
Time Trax	1993–1994	Original	Syndication	
Walker, Texas Ranger	1993–2001	Original	CBS	Series starring Chuck Norris.
Kung Fu: The Legend Continues	1993–1997	Original	PTEN	Sequel to Kung Fu.
Gridman the Hyper Agent	1993–1994	Original	TBS	
The X-Files	1993–2018	Original	Fox	
Acapulco H.E.A.T.	1993–1999	Original	Syndication	
Star Trek: Deep Space Nine	1993–1999	Original	Syndication	Part of the Star Trek franchise.
RoboCop: The Series	1994	Original	CTV	Based on the RoboCop film series. Set between the first two films.
The Secret World of Alex Mack	1994–1998	Original	Nickelodeon	
VR Troopers	1994–1996	Original	Syndication	Series containing footage of Choujinki Metalder, Jikuu Senshi Spielban and Space Sheriff Shaider.
Superhuman Samurai Syber-Squad	1994–1995	Original	Syndication	Series containing footage of Gridman the Hyper Agent.
Tattooed Teenage Alien Fighters from Beverly Hills	1994	Original	USA Network	
Touched by an Angel	1994	Original	CBS	
Thunder in Paradise	1994	Original	Syndication	Series starring pro-wrestler Hulk Hogan.
Get Smart	1995	Original	Fox	Sequel to Get Smart.
M.A.N.T.I.S.	1995	Original	Fox	
Bibleman	1995–2016	Original	TBN	
Hercules: The Legendary Journeys	1995–1999	Original	Syndication	
Xena: Warrior Princess	1995–2001	Original	Syndication	Spin-off of Hercules: The Legendary Journeys.
Masked Rider	1995–1996	Original	Fox	Series containing footage of Kamen Rider Black RX.
Baywatch Nights	1995–1997	Original	Syndication	Spin-off of Baywatch.,
Star Trek: Voyager	1995–2001	Original	UPN	
Fist of Fury	1995	Original	ATV Home	Series based on the film Fist of Fury.
Cybersix	1995	Argentine comics	Telefe	Series based on the comic book Cybersix by Carlos Meglia.
The Pretender	1996–2000	Original	NBC	
Big Bad Beetleborgs	1996–1998	Original	Fox	Series containing footage of Juukou B-Fighter and B-Fighter Kabuto.
The Sentinel	1996–1999	Original	UPN	
Early Edition	1996–2000	Original	CBS	
Sabrina the Teenage Witch	1996–2003	Archie Comics	ABC	Series based on the comic book Sabrina the Teenage Witch.
Tarzan: The Epic Adventures	1996–1997	A.C. McClurg	Syndication	
Millennium	1996–1999	Original	Fox	Part of The X-Files franchise.
The Adventures of Sinbad	1996–1998	Original	Global Television Network	Series based on Sinbad the Sailor.
Poltergeist: The Legacy	1996–1999	Original	Showtime	
Profiler	1996–2000	Original	NBC	
Viper	1996–1999	Original	NBC	
Journey to the West	1996	Wu Cheng'en	TVB Jade	Series based on the novel.
Neverwhere	1996	Original	BBC Two	Series created by Neil Gaiman.
Ninja Turtles: The Next Mutation	1997–1998	Mirage Studios	Fox	The series had a crossover with Power Rangers in Space.
Buffy the Vampire Slayer	1997–2003	Original	Syndication	Continuation of the Buffy the Vampire Slayer film
La Femme Nikita	1997–2001	Original	CTV	Series based on the film La Femme Nikita.
Conan the Adventurer	1997–1998	Weird Tales	Syndication	Series based on the character created by Robert E. Howard.
Betaal Pachisi	1997–1998	King Features Syndicate	DD National	Indian series based on the comic strip The Phantom by Lee Falk.
The New Adventures of Robin Hood	1997–1998	William Langland	TNT	Series based on the legend of Robin Hood.
Team Knight Rider	1997–1998	Original	NBC	Sequel to Knight Rider.
Shaktimaan	1997–2005	Original	Doordarshan	
Godzilla Island	1997–1998	Original	TV Tokyo	Spinoff of the Godzilla franchise.
Highlander: The Raven	1998–1999	Original	USA Network	Spin-off of Highlander: The Series.
The Crow: Stairway to Heaven	1998–1999	Caliber Press	Syndication	
Young Hercules	1998–1999	Original	Fox	Prequel to Hercules: The Legendary Journeys.
Charmed	1998–2006	Original	The WB	
Animorphs	1998–1999	Scholastic	Nickelodeon	
Mystic Knights of Tir Na Nog	1998–1999	Original	Fox	
V.I.P.	1998–2002	Original	Syndication	
Mortal Kombat: Conquest	1998–1999	Midway Games	Syndication	Series based on the video game Mortal Kombat.
Journey to the West II	1998	Wu Cheng'en	TVB Jade	Sequel to Journey to the West.
Captain Vyom	1998–1999	Original	DD National	
The Famous Jett Jackson	1998–2001	Original	Disney Channel	
Angel	1999–2004	Original	The WB	Spin-off of Buffy the Vampire Slayer.
Now and Again	1999–2000	Original	CBS	
Relic Hunter	1999–2002	Original	Syndication	
Harsh Realm	1999–2000	Harris Publications	Fox	Series based on the comic book by James D. Hudnall and Andrew Paquette. The series was exec-produced by X-Files creator Chris Carter.
Roswell	1999–2002	Pocket Books	The WB	Series based on the book series Roswell High by Melinda Metz.
Big Wolf on Campus	1999–2002	Original	YTV	
BeastMaster	1999–2002	Original	CTV	Series based on the film The Beastmaster.
Voicelugger	1999	Original	TV Tokyo	
Dark Angel	2000–2002	Original	Fox	
My Hero	2000–2006	Original	BBC One	
Sheena	2000–2002	Fiction House	Syndication	
The Invisible Man	2000–2002	C. Arthur Pearson	Syfy	
Cleopatra 2525	2000–2001	Original	Syndication	
France Five	2000	Original	Syndication	Series inspired by Super Sentai.
Level 9	2000–2001	Original	UPN	
The Others	2000	Original	NBC	
Queen of Swords	2000–2001	Original	Global Television Network	
Jack of All Trades	2000	Original	Syndication	
Freedom	2000	Original	UPN	
Son of the Beach	2000–2002	Original	FX	Parody of Baywatch.
The Tick	2001–2002	New England Comics	Fox	
Black Scorpion	2001	Original	Syfy	Continuation of the films Black Scorpion and Black Scorpion II.
Los Luchadores	2001	Original	YTV	
Cybergirl	2001–2002	Original	Network Ten	
Alias	2001–2006	Original	ABC	
RoboCop: Prime Directives	2001	Original	Space	Part of the RoboCop franchise.
Atlantis High	2001–2002	Original	Channel 5	
The Lone Gunmen	2001	Original	Fox	Spin-off of The X-Files.
Special Unit 2	2001–2002	Original	UPN	
24	2001–2010	Original	Fox	
Star Trek: Enterprise	2001–2005	Original	UPN	
The Monkey King	2001	Wu Cheng'en	Syfy	Series based on the novel Journey to the West.
The Chronicle	2001–2002	Random House	Syfy	Series based on News from the Edge by Mark Sumner.
Ace Lightning	2002–2004	Original	CBBC	
John Doe	2002–2003	Original	Fox	
She Spies	2002–2004	Original	Syndication	
Firefly	2002	Original	Fox	
Legacy of the Silver Shadow	2002	Original	Network 10	
Jeremiah	2002–2004	Le Lombard/Dupuis	Showtime	Series based on the comic book Jeremiah by Hermann Huppen.
The Monkey King: Quest for the Sutra	2002	Wu Cheng'en	TVB	Series based on the novel Journey to the West.
Firestarter: Rekindled	2002	Viking Press	Syfy	Continuation of the film Firestarter
Jake 2.0	2003–2004	Original	UPN	
Tru Calling	2003–2005	Original	Fox	
Junior G	2003–present	Original	DD National	
Tarzan	2003	A.C. McClurg	The WB	Series based on the book by Edgar Rice Burroughs.
Pretty Guardian Sailor Moon	2003–2004	Kodansha	Chubu-Nippon Broadcasting	Adaptation of the Sailor Moon franchise.
The 4400	2004–2007	Original	USA Network	
LazyTown	2004–2014	Original	Nick Jr. Channel	
Krystala	2004–2005	Original	ABS-CBN	
Mulawin	2004–2005	Original	GMA Network	
Hex	2004–2005	Original	Sky One	
Kyle XY	2005–2009	Original	ABC/ABC Family	
Ghost Whisperer	2005–2010	Original	CBS	
Supernatural	2005–2020	Original	The CW	
Mighty Moshin' Emo Rangers	2005–2015	Original	MTV UK	Parody of Power Rangers.
Darna	2005	Mango Comics	GMA Network	Series based on the comic book by Mars Ravelo.
Medium	2005–2011	Original	NBC, CBS	
Ang Panday	2005–2006	Filipino Komiks	ABS-CBN	Series based on the comic book Panday by Carlo J. Caparas.
Encantadia	2005	Original	GMA Network	Part of the Encantadia franchise.
Garo	2005–2006	Original	TXN	
Young Blades	2005	Alexandre Dumas	PAX-TV	Series based on the novel The Three Musketeers.
Heroes	2006–2010	Original	NBC	
Monster Warriors	2006–2008	Original	YTV	
The Amazing Extraordinary Friends	2006–2008	Original	TVNZ 2	
Who Wants to Be a Superhero?	2006–2007	POW! Entertainment	Syfy	Reality series hosted by Stan Lee.
Captain Barbell	2006–2007	Pinoy Komiks	GMA Network	Series based on the graphic novels by Mars Ravelo.
Majika	2006	Original	GMA Network	
Robin Hood	2006–2009	William Langland	BBC One	Series based on the legend of Robin Hood.
Mega Mindy	2006–2014	Original	Ketnet	
Sport Ranger	2006–2012	Original	Channel 3 (Thailand)	
Super Inggo	2006–2007	Original	ABS-CBN	
Torchwood	2006–2011	Original	BBC Three	Spin-off of Doctor Who.
Life on Mars	2006–2007	Original	BBC One	
Super Inggo 1.5: Ang Bagong Bangis	2007	Original	ABS-CBN	Prequel to Super Inggo.
Bionic Woman	2007	Original	NBC	Reboot of The Bionic Woman.
Painkiller Jane	2007	Event Comics	Global/Syfy	
Journeyman	2007	Original	NBC	
Chuck	2007–2012	Original	NBC	
Moonlight	2007–2008	Original	CBS	
Flash Gordon	2007–2008	King Features Syndicate	Syfy	Series based on the comic strip by Alex Raymond.
Reaper	2007–2009	Original	The CW	
The Dresden Files	2007	Roc Books	Syfy	Adaptation of the Dresden Files by Jim Butcher.
El Zorro, la espada y la rosa	2007	Argosy	Telemundo	
Lastikman	2007–2008	Mango Comics	ABS-CBN	Series based on the comic book Lastikman by Mars Ravelo.
Cutie Honey: The Live	2007–2008	Akita Shoten	TV Tokyo	Series based on the manga Cutie Honey by Go Nagai.
Kamandag	2007–2008	Carlo J. Caparas	GMA Network	Series based on the graphic novel by Caparas.
The Sarah Jane Adventures	2007–2011	Original	CBBC	Spin-off of Doctor Who.
Fantastic Man	2007	Original	GMA Network	
Zaido: Pulis Pangkalawakan	2007–2008	Original	GMA Network	Spin-off of Space Sheriff Shaider.
El Pantera	2007–2010	Mundo Vid	Canal 5	Series based on the comic book by Daniel Munoz.
Super Twins	2007	Original	GMA Network	
Da Adventures of Pedro Penduko	2007	Joshua Calungsod	ABS-CBAN	Series based on the comic character Pedro Penduko.
Terminator: The Sarah Connor Chronicles	2008–2009	Original	Fox	
Fringe	2008–2013	Original	Fox	
The Middleman	2008	Viper Comics	ABC Family	Series adapted from the comic book The Middleman
Kamen Rider: Dragon Knight	2008–2009	Original	The CW	Series containing footage of Kamen Rider Ryuki.
No Heroics	2008	Original	ITV2	
Codename: Asero	2008	Original	GMA Network	
Kung Fu Kids	2008	Original	GMA Network	
True Blood	2008–2014	Ace Books	HBO	Series based on The Southern Vampire Mysteries book series by Charlaine Harris.
Being Human	2008–2013	Original	BBC Three	
Komiks Presents: Varga	2008	Bulaklak Magazine	ABS-CBS	Series based on the comic book Varga by Mars Ravelo.
Komiks Presents: Tiny Tony	2008	Pinoy Komiks	ABS-CBN	Series based on the comic book Tiny Tony by Mars Ravelo.
Gagambino	2008–2009	Carlo J. Caparas	GMA Network	Series based on the graphic novel by Caparas.
Komiks Presents: Kapitan Boom	2008	United Komiks	ABS-CBN	Series based on the comic strip Captain Boom by Mars Ravelo.
Komiks Presents: Dragonna	2008–2009	Komiks	ABS-CBN	Series based on the comic strip Dragonna by Mars Ravelo.
Legend of the Seeker	2008–2010	Tor Books	Syndication	Series based on the book The Sword of Truth by Terry Goodkind.
Tomica Hero Series	2008–2010	Original	TV Aichi	
Volta	2008	Original	ABS-CBN	Series based on the film Volta.
Dr. Horrible's Sing-Along Blog	2008	Original	Syndication	
Merlin	2008–2012	Matter of Britain	BBC One	Series based on the legend of King Arthur.
Knight Rider	2008–2009	Original	NBC	Reboot of the series Knight Rider.
Legend of the Fist: Chen Zhen	2008	Original	TVB	Series featuring the character Chen Zhen.
The Phantom	2009	King Features Syndicate	Syfy	
The Listener	2009–2014	Original	CTV	
Dollhouse	2009–2010	Original	Fox	
Misfits	2009–2013	Original	E4	
Aaron Stone	2009–2010	Original	Disney XD	
The Electric Company	2009–2011	Original	PBS	Reboot of The Electric Company.
Zorro	2009	Argosy	GMA Network	
The Vampire Diaries	2009–2017	Harper Paperbacks	The CW	Series based on The Vampire Diaries book series by L.J. Smith.
K-9	2009–2010	Original	Network Ten	Spin-Off of Doctor Who.
Darna	2009–2010	Mango Comics	GMA Network	Series based on the comic book by Mars Ravelo.
Warehouse 13	2009–2014	Original	Syfy	
Komiks Presents: Flash Bomba	2009	Klasiks Magazine	ABS-CBN	Series based on the comic book Flash Bomba by Mars Ravelo.
No Ordinary Family	2010–2011	Original	ABC	Partly inspired by the film The Incredibles.
Lost Girl	2010–2015	Original	Showcase/Syfy	
Tower Prep	2010	Original	Cartoon Network	
Nikita	2010–2013	Original	The CW	Reboot of La Femme Nikita.
Sherlock	2010–2017	Ward Lock & Co	BBC One	Series featuring the character Sherlock Holmes created by Sir Arthur Conan Doyle.
Wu Cheng'en and Journey to the West	2010	Wu Cheng'en	Shandong Qilu TV	Series based on the novel.
Journey to the West	2010	Wu Cheng'en	Zheijang Satellite TV	Series based on the novel.
Pandamen	2010	Original	CTS	
Luther	2010–2019	Original	BBC One	
Alphas	2011–2012	Original	Syfy	
The Cape	2011	Original	NBC	
Teen Wolf	2011–2017	Original	MTV	Based on the film Teen Wolf.
The Nine Lives of Chloe King	2011	Liz Braswell	ABC Family	Based on the book series by Liz Braswell.
Supah Ninjas	2011–2013	Original	Nickelodeon	
Grimm	2011–2017	Original	NBC	
The Almighty Johnsons	2011–2013	Original	TV3	
Mortal Kombat: Legacy	2011–2013	Midway Games	YouTube	Series based on the video game Mortal Kombat.
Charlie's Angels	2011	Original	ABC	Reboot of Charlie's Angels.
Being Human	2011–2014	Original	Syfy	American reboot of Being Human.
The Fades	2011	Original	BBC Three	
Captain Barbell	2011	Pinoy Komiks	GMA Network	Series based on the graphic novel by Mars Ravelo.
XIII: The Series	2011–2012	Cinebook, Ltd	Reelz	Series based on the graphic novel by Jean Van Hamme and William Vance.
Journey to the West	2011	Wu Cheng'en	Television Southern	Series based on the novel.
Camelot	2011	Matter of Britain	Starz	Series based on the legend of King Arthur.
Person of Interest	2011–2016	Original	CBS	Series created by Jonathan Nolan.
Femme Fatales	2011–2012	David E. Williams	Cinemax	Series based on the magazine Femme Fatales.
Machete	2011	Original	GMA Network	
Garo: Makai Senki	2011–2012	Original	TV Tokyo	Part of the Garo franchise.
Humanoid Monster Bem	2011	Original	NTV	Live-action remake of the animated series of the same name.
Game of Thrones	2011–2019	Bantam Books	HBO	Series based on the novel A Song of Ice and Fire by George R.R. Martin.
Danger 5	2012–2015	Original	SBS	
Beauty and the Beast	2012–2016	Original	The CW	Reboot of Beauty and the Beast.
Continuum	2012–2015	Original	Showcase	
Lab Rats	2012–2016	Original	Disney XD	
The Aquabats! Super Show!	2012–2014	Original	Hub Network	Fictional series based on the band The Aquabats.
Wolfblood	2012–2017	Original	CBBC	
Transporter: The Series	2012–2014	Original	TNT	Continuation of the Transporter film series.
Elementary	2012–2019	Ward Lock & Co	CBS	Series featuring the character Sherlock Holmes by Sir Arthur Conan Doyle.
Wizards vs. Aliens	2012–2014	Original	CBBC	
Bridal Mask	2012	Huh Young-man	Korean Broadcasting System	Series based on a comic by Huh Young-man.
The Thundermans	2013–2018	Original	Nickelodeon	
Mighty Med	2013–2015	Original	Disney XD	
The Tomorrow People	2013–2014	Original	The CW	American reboot of The Tomorrow People.
Crossing Lines	2013–2015	Original	NBC	
Code Lyoko: Evolution	2013	Original	France 2	Live-action sequel to the animated series Code Lyoko.
I Can Hear Your Voice	2013	Original	SBS TV	
Utopia	2013–2014	Original	Channel 4	
Ip Man	2013	Original	Shandong Television	Series based on the life of martial artist Ip Man.
Garo: Yami o Terasu Mono	2013	Original	TV Tokyo	Part of the Garo franchise.
Sleepy Hollow	2013–2017	The Sketch Book	Fox	Series based on "The Legend of Sleepy Hollow" by Washington Irving.
My Love from the Star'	2013–2014	Original	SBS TV	
Intelligence	2014	Original	CBS	
Believe	2014	Original	ABC	
Henry Danger	2014–2020	Original	Nickelodeon	
The Librarians	2014–2018	Original	TNT	Continuation of The Librarian films.
Penny Dreadful	2014–2016	Original	Showtime	
Maharakshak: Aryan	2014–2015	Original	Zee TV	
Forever	2014–2015	Original	ABC	
Scorpion	2014–2018	Original	CBS	Series loosely based on the life of Walter O'Brien.
Street Fighter: Assassin's Fist	2014	Capcom	YouTube	Series based on the Street Fighter video game.
The Musketeers	2014–2016	Alexandre Dumas	BBC One	Series based on the novel The Three Musketeers.
Maha Kumbh: Ek Rahasaya, Ek Kahani	2014–2015	Original	Life Ok	
24: Live Another Day	2014	Original	Fox	Continuation of 24
Heroes Reborn	2015–2016	Original	NBC	
Garo: Makai no Hana	2014	Original	TXN	Part of the Garo franchise.
Zero: Black Blood	2014	Original	Syndication	Part of the Garo franchise.
The Messengers	2015	Original	The CW	
Limitless	2015–2016	Original	CBS	Based on the film Limitless.
Ash vs Evil Dead	2015–2018	Original	Starz	Continuation of the original Evil Dead films.
Into the Badlands	2015–2019	Wu Cheng'en	AMC	Series loosely based on the novel Journey to the West.
Sense8	2015–2017	Original	Netflix	
Maharakshak: Devi	2015	Zee TV		
Killjoys	2015–2019	Original	Space	
Neon Joe, Werewolf Hunter	2015–2017	Original	Cartoon Network	Part of Adult Swim.
Stitchers	2015–2017	Original	Freeform	
K.C. Undercover	2015–2018	Original	Disney Channel	
Jekyll and Hyde	2015	Longman	ITV	Series based on The Strange Case of Dr. Jekyll & Mr. Hyde.
The Magicians	2015–2020	Viking Press	Syfy	Series based on the novel by Lev Grossman.
New Journey to the West	2015–2017	Wu Cheng'en	TVN	Series based on the novel.
Blindspot	2015–2020	Original	NBC	
Garo: Gold Storm Sho	2015	Original	TXN	Part of the Garo franchise.
Minority Report	2015	Fantastic Universe	Fox	Series based on The Minority Report franchise by Philip K. Dick.
Lab Rats: Elite Force	2016–2017	Original	Disney XD	Spin-off of Lab Rats and Mighty Med.
Stranger Things	2016–2026	Original	Netflix	
Stan Lee's Lucky Man	2016–2018	POW! Entertainment	Sky 1	
Cleverman	2016–2017	Original	SundanceTV	
Sweet/Vicious	2016–2017	Original	MTV	
Mech-X4	2016–2018	Original	Disney Channel	
Son of Zorn	2016–2017	Original	Fox	Parody of He-Man and the Masters of the Universe and ThunderCats.
MacGyver	2016–2021	Original	CBS	Reboot of MacGyver.
The Encounter	2016–present	Original	Syndication	Continuation of The Encounter film series.
Garo: Makai Retsuden	2016	Original	TXN	Part of the Garo franchise.
Street Fighter: Resurrection	2016	Capcom	Machinima, Inc.	Series based on the Street Fighter video game.
Shadowhunters	2016–2019	Margaret K. McElderry	Freeform	Series based on the book series The Mortal Instruments by Cassandra Clare.
Class	2016	Original	BBC Three	Spin-off of Doctor Who.
My Super D	2016	Original	ABS-CBN	
Ang Panday	2016	Filipino Komiks	TV5	Series based on the comic Panday by Carlo J. Caparas
The Tick	2016–2019	New England Comics	Amazon Prime Video	Series based on the comic book Tick by Ben Edlund.
Van Helsing	2016–2021	Constable & Robinson/Zenescope Entertainment	Syfy	Series based on Abraham Van Helsing, a character from the Bram Stoker book Dracula.
Bring It On, Ghost	2016	Naver	Series based on a webtoon.	
Alyas Robin Hood	2016–2017	Original	GMA Network	
Guardian: The Lonely and Great God'	2016–2017	Original	tvN	
Electra Woman and Dyna Girl	2016	Original	Syndication	Web series based on Electra Woman and Dyna Girl.
Travelers	2016–2019	Original	Showcase	
The OA	2016–2019	Original	Netflix	
Beyond	2017–2018	Original	Freeform	
APB	2017	Original	Fox	
Future Man	2017–2020	Original	Hulu	Series executive produced by Seth Rogen and Evan Goldberg.
Kevin (Probably) Saves the World	2017–2018	Original	ABC	
Strong Girl Bong-soon	2017	Original	JTBC	
Power Rangers Dino Force Brave	2017	Original	Syndication	Series loosely adapted from the Power Rangers and Super Sentai franchises.
A Korean Odyssey	2017–2018	Wu Cheng'en	TVN	Series based on the novel Journey to the West.
American Gods	2017–2021	HarperCollins	Starz	Series based on the novel American Gods by Neil Gaiman.
Star Trek: Discovery	2017–present	Original	CBS All Access	Part of the Star Trek franchise.
Zero: Dragon Blood	2017	Original	TXN	Part of the Garo franchise.
Riverdale	2017–2023	Archie Comics	The CW	Series based on Archie Comics.
Super Ma'am	2017–2018	Original	GMA Network	
ReBoot: The Guardian Code	2018	Original	Netflix	A live-action re-imagining of the animated series ReBoot.
Ninjak vs. the Valiant Universe	2018	Valiant Comics	Syndication	Series featuring characters from the Valiant Universe.
The New Legends of Monkey	2018–present	Wu Cheng'en	Netflix	Series based on the television show Monkey.
Mob Psycho 100	2018	Shogakukan	Netflix	Series based on the web manga by One.
Knight Squad	2018–2019	Original	Nickelodeon	
Charmed	2018–2022	Original	The CW	Reboot of the series Charmed.
Legacies	2018–2022	Original	The CW	Spin-off of the television series The Originals.
Chilling Adventures of Sabrina	2018–2020	Archie Comics	Netflix	Series based on the comic book Chilling Adventures of Sabrina.
The Protector	2018–2020	Original	Netflix	
Kami no Kiba: Jinga	2018	Tokyo MX	Part of the Garo franchise.	
The Boys	2019–present	Dynamite Entertainment	Prime Video	Series based on the comic book series The Boys by Garth Ennis and Darick Robertson.
Nancy Drew	2019–2023	Grosset & Dunlap	The CW	Series featuring the character Nancy Drew.
Shadow	2019	Original	Netflix	
NOS4A2	2019–2020	William Morrow and Company	AMC	Series based on the novel NOS4A2 by Joe Hill.
The Rook	2019	Hachette Book Group	Starz	Series based on The Rook by Daniel O'Malley.
O Doutrinador: A Série	2019	Arkhaven Comics	Space	Series based on the comic O Doutrinador by Luciano Cunha.
Wu Assassins	2019	Original	Netflix	
Raising Dion	2019–2022	Traffik Filmworks	Netflix	Series based on the comic by Dennis Liu.
Mortel	2019	Original	Netflix	
He Is Psychometric	2019	Original	tvN	
The Mandalorian	2019–2023	Original	Disney+	Part of the Star Wars franchise.
Kim Hushable	2019	Original	Disney Channel	Miniseries taking place after the live-action Kim Possible film.
Warrior	2019–2023	Original	Cinemax	Series based on writings by Bruce Lee.
The Neighbor	2019–2021	Astiberri Editions	Netflix	Series based on the comic series El Vecino.
Cursed	2020	Simon & Schuster	Netflix	Series based on the graphic novel by Frank Miller.
Star Trek: Picard	2020	Original	CBS All Access	Continuation of Star Trek: The Next Generation.
Ragnarok	2020	Original	Netflix	
I Am Not Okay with This	2020	Fantagraphics Books	Netflix	
Danger Force	2020–2024	Original	Nickelodeon	Spin-off of Henry Danger.
Rugal	2020	Rel.mae	OCN	Series based on the webtoon.
Vagrant Queen	2020	Vault Comics	Syfy	Series based on the comic book by Magdalene Visaggio.
The Uncanny Counter	2020–2023	Kakao Webtoon	OCN	Series based on the webtoon by Jang Yi.
Warrior Nun	2020–2022	Antarctic Press	Netflix	Series based on the comic Warrior Nun Areala by Ben Dunn.
Trickster	2020	Penguin Random House Canada	CBC	Series based on the novel Son of a Trickster by Eden Robinson.
Utopia	2020	Original	Amazon Prime Video	American remake of the British series Utopia.
The School Nurse Files	2020	Original	Netflix	
Fate: The Winx Saga	2021–2022	Original	Netflix	Live-action series based on the animated show Winx Club.
The Equalizer	2021–2025	Original	CBS	Reboot of the series The Equalizer.
Kung Fu	2021–2023	Original	The CW	Series based on the Kung Fu franchise.
Shadow and Bone	2021–present	Macmillan Publishers	Netflix	Series based on the novel Shadow and Bone by Leigh Bardugo.
The Irregulars	2021	Ward Lock & Co	Netflix	Series based on characters from the Sherlock Holmes franchise.
Seven on 7	2021–present	Dynamite Entertainment	YouTube	Part of The Boys franchise.
The Nevers	2021	Original	HBO	
Zero	2021	Original	Netflix	
4400	2021–2022	Original	The CW	Reboot of the series The 4400.
Cowboy Bebop	2021	Original	Netflix	Live-action reboot of the anime Cowboy Bebop
The Book of Boba Fett	2021	Original	Disney+	Spin-off of The Mandalorian.
Astrid and Lilly Save the World	2022	Original	Syfy	
The Guardians of Justice	2022	Original	Netflix	
Star Trek: Strange New Worlds	2022–2024	Original	Paramount+	Part of the Star Trek franchise.
Obi-Wan Kenobi	2022	Original	Disney+	Continuation of Revenge of the Sith.
The Villains of Valley View	2022–2023	Original	Disney Channel	
Ultra Violet & Black Scorpion	2022	Original	Disney Channel	
Resident Evil	2022	Capcom	Netflix	Based on the video game series Resident Evil.
Reginald the Vampire	2022–2024	Sterling & Stone	Syfy	Series based on the book Fat Vampire by Johnny B. Truant.
The Imperfects	2022	Original	Netflix	
Andor	2022	Original	Disney+	Continuation of Rogue One.
¡García!	2022	Santiago Garcia/Luis Bustos	HBO Max	Series based on a graphic novel.
Quantum Leap	2022–2024	Original	NBC	Reboot of the series Quantum Leap.
The Winchesters	2022–2023	Original	The CW	Prequel to the series Supernatural.
Darna	2022–2023	Ace Publications	Kapamilya Channel	Series based on the character created by Mars Ravelo.
Gen V	2023–2025	Dynamite Entertainment	Prime Video	Spin-off of the television series The Boys.
Extraordinary	2023–2024	Original	Hulu	
Poker Face	2023–present	Original	Peacock	
Wolf Pack	2023	Tundra Books	Paramount+	Series based on the book by Edo van Belkom.
Lockwood & Co.	2023	Random House	Netflix	Series based on the book Lockwood & Co. by Jonathan Stroud.
Mila in the Multiverse	2023–present	Original	Disney+	
The Power	2023	Viking Press	Amazon Prime Studios	Series based on the novel The Power by Naomi Alderman.
American Born Chinese	2023	First Second Books	Disney+	Series based on the graphic novel American Born Chinese by Gene Luen Yang.
I'm a Virgo	2023	Original	Prime Video	
Moving	2023–present	Kang Full	Hulu	Series based on the webtoon of the same name.
Ahsoka	2023	Original	Disney+	Part of the Star Wars franchise.
One Piece	2023–present	Shueisha	Netflix	Series based on the manga One Piece by Eiichiro Oda.
Behind Your Touch	2023	Original	JTBC	
Strong Girl Nam-soon	2023	Original	JTBC	Spin-off of the series Strong Girl Bong-soon.
The Last of Us	2023–present	Sony Interactive Entertainment	Max	Series based on The Last of Us video game franchise.
Vigilante	2023–present	Naver	Disney+	
Zorro	2024	Argosy	Prime Video	Part of the Zorro franchise.
Avatar: The Last Airbender	2024–present	Original	Netflix	Live action reboot of the animated series Avatar: The Last Airbender.
Renegade Nell	2024	Original	Disney+	
Knuckles	2024	Sega	Paramount+	Spin-off of the Sonic the Hedgehog film series.
Zorro	2024	Argosy	Paramount+	Part of the Zorro franchise.
The Acolyte	2024	Original	Disney+	Part of the Star Wars franchise.
Supacell	2024–present	Original	Netflix	
Star Wars: Skeleton Crew	2024	Original	Disney+	Part of the Star Wars franchise.
The Franchise	2024	Original	Max	
The Atypical Family	2024	Original	JTBC	
The Thundermans: Undercover	2025–present	Original	Nickelodeon	Continuation of The Thundermans television series.
Watson	2025–present	Ward, Lock & Co.	CBS	Series based on characters from the Sherlock Holmes franchise.
Sherlock & Daughter	2025–2026	Ward, Lock & Co.	The CW	Series based on characters from the Sherlock Holmes franchise.
The Librarians: The Next Chapter	2025–2026	Original	TNT	Continuation the television series The Librarians.
Twelve	2025	Original	KBS2	
Cashero	2025	Team Beta	Netflix	Series based on a webtoon.
Armorsaurs	2025–present	Daewon Media	Disney XD	
Star Trek: Starfleet Academy	2026–present	Original	Paramount+	Part of the Star Trek franchise.
Young Sherlock	2026	Ward, Lock & Co.	Amazon Prime Video	Series based on characters from the Sherlock Holmes franchise.
The Wonderfools	2026	Original	Netflix	
Vought Rising	TBA	Dynamite Entertainment	Amazon Prime Video	Part of The Boys franchise.
Tomb Raider	TBA	Crystal Dynamics	Amazon Prime Video	Series based on the Tomb Raider franchise.

== Animated ==
Title	Year(s)	Publisher	Network	Notes
Courageous Cat and Minute Mouse	1960–1962	Original	Syndication	Batman parody created by Bob Kane.
Popeye	1960–1961	King Features Syndicate	ABC	Series based on the comic strip Popeye by E.C. Segar.
The Dick Tracy Show	1961–1962	Detroit Mirror	Syndication	Series based on the comic strip Dick Tracy by Chester Gould.
Astro Boy	1963–1966	Kobunsha	Fuji TV	Adaptation of the manga series Astro Boy.
8 Man	1963–1964	Kodansha	TBS	Series based on the manga by Kazumasa Hirai.
Gigantor	1963–1966	Kobunsha	Fuji TV	Series based on the manga Tetsujin 28-go by Mitsuteru Yokoyama.
Underdog	1964–1973	Original	NBC	
Jonny Quest	1964–1965	Original	ABC	
Atom Ant	1965–1967	Original	NBC	Segment from The Atom Ant/Secret Squirrel Show.
Secret Squirrel	1965–1967	Original	NBC	Segment from The Atom Ant/Secret Squirrel Show.
Marine Boy	1965–1971	Original	Fuji TV	
Thunderbirds	1965–1966	Original	Associated Television	
Roger Ramjet	1965–1969	Original	Syndication	
Batfink	1966–1967	Original	KTLA	
Frankenstein Jr. and The Impossibles	1966–1968	Original	CBS	
Space Ghost	1966–1968	Original	CBS	
The Mighty Heroes	1966–1967	Original	CBS	Series created by animator Ralph Bakshi.
The Lone Ranger	1966–1969	WXYT (AM)	CBS	Series based on the radio show The Lone Ranger.
Rocket Robin Hood	1966–1969	William Langland	CBC	Series based on the legend of Robin Hood.
The Super 6	1966–1969	Original	NBC	
Cool McCool	1966–1969	Original	NBC	Series created by Batman creator Bob Kane.
Birdman and the Galaxy Trio	1967–1969	Original	NBC	
Moby Dick and Mighty Mightor	1967–1969	Original	CBS	
Samson & Goliath	1967–1968	Original	NBC	
Super President	1967–1968	Original	NBC	
Super Chicken	1967	Original	ABC	Segment from George of the Jungle
The Herculoids	1967–1968	Original	ABC	
Captain Scarlet and the Mysterons	1967–1968	Original	Associated Television	
Shazzan	1967–1968	Original	CBS	
Speed Racer	1967–1968	Shueisha	Fuji TV	Series based on the manga Speed Racer.
Ogon Bat	1967–1968	Original	Yomiuri TV	
The Adventures of Hijitus	1967–1974	Anteojito	Canal 13	Series based on the comic strip by Manuel Garcia Ferre.
The Three Musketeers	1968–1969	Alexandre Dumas	NBC	Segment from The Banana Splits Adventure Hour.
Humanoid Monster Bem	1968–1969	Original	Fuji TV	
Cyborg 009	1968	Tokyopop	NET	Series based on the manga Cyborg 009 by Shotaro Ishinomori.
Scooby-Doo, Where Are You!	1969–1978	Original	CBS	Series featuring Scooby-Doo
Sabrina the Teenage Witch	1970–1974	Archie Comics	CBS	Series based on the comic book Sabrina the Teenage Witch.
Science Ninja Team Gatchaman	1972–1974	Original	Fuji TV	
Mazinger Z	1972–1974	Shueisha	Fuji TV	Series based on the manga by Go Nagai.
Moonlight Mask	1972	Original	NTV	Animated reboot of the 1958 series.
Devilman	1972–1973	Kodansha	TV Asahi	Series based on the manga by Go Nagai.
The New Scooby-Doo Movies	1972–1973	Original	ABC	Part of the Scooby-Doo franchise.
The Brown Hornet	1972–1984	Original	CBS	Cartoon-within-a-cartoon on Fat Albert and the Cosby Kids.
Cutie Honey	1973–1973	Akita Shoten	TV Asahi	Series based on the manga by Go Nagai.
Microid S	1973	Akita Shoten	TV Asashi	
Star Trek: The Animated Series	1973–1974	Original	NBC	Animated sequel to Star Trek.
Inch High, Private Eye	1973	Original	NBC	
Hong Kong Phooey	1974	Original	ABC	
Hurricane Polymar	1974–1975	Original	TV Asahi	
Wheelie and the Chopper Bunch	1974	Original	NBC	
Tekkaman: The Space Knight	1975	Original	NET	
Dynomutt, Dog Wonder	1976–1977	Original	ABC	Series featuring Scooby-Doo characters.
Tarzan, Lord of the Jungle	1976–1980	A.C. McClurg	CBS	
The Scooby-Doo Show	1976–1978	Original	ABC	Part of the Scooby-Doo franchise.
Captain Caveman and the Teen Angels	1977–1980	Original	ABC	
The Robonic Stooges	1977–1978	Original	CBS	Series featuring superheroes based on The Three Stooges
Space Sentinels	1977	Original	NBC	
Baggy Pants and the Nitwits	1977	Original	NBC	Series featuring characters from Rowan & Martin's Laugh-In.
Laff-A-Lympics	1977–1978	Original	ABC	Series featuring various superheroes from Hanna-Barbera.
The Freedom Force	1978–1980	Original	CBS	Part of Tarzan and the Super 7.
Manta and Moray	1978–1980	Original	CBS	Part of Tarzan and the Super 7.
Superstretch and Microwoman	1978–1980	Original	CBS	Part of Tarzan and the Super 7.
Web Woman	1978–1980	Original	CBS	Part of Tarzan and the Super 7.
Godzilla	1978–1979	Original	NBC	Part of the Godzilla franchise.
The All-New Popeye Hour	1978–1983	King Features Syndicate	CBS	Series based on the comic strip Popeye by E.C. Segar.
Fangface	1978–1980	Original	ABC	
Gatchaman II	1978–1979	Original	Fuji TV	Sequel to Science Ninja Team Gatchaman.
The Super Globetrotters	1979	Original	NBC	Spin-off of Harlem Globetrotters.
The New Adventures of Flash Gordon	1979–1982	King Features Syndicate	NBC	Series based on the comic strip Flash Gordon by Alex Raymond.
Cyborg 009	1979–1980	TV Asahi	Tokyopop	Series based on the manga Cyborg 009 by Shotaro Ishinomori.
Mighty Man and Yukk	1979–1981	Original	ABC	Part of The Plastic Man Comedy/Adventure Show.
The New Adventures of Mighty Mouse and Heckle & Jeckle	1979–1980	Original	CBS	Series featuring Mighty Mouse, Heckle & Jeckle and Quacula.
Scooby-Doo and Scrappy-Doo	1979–1980	Original	ABC	Part of the Scooby-Doo franchise.
Thundarr the Barbarian	1980–1982	Original	ABC	
The Lone Ranger	1980–1982	WXYT (AM)	CBS	Series based on the radio show The Lone Ranger.
Astro Boy	1980–1981	Kobunsha	NTV	Adaptation of the manga series Astro Boy.
The New Adventures of Gigantor	1980–1981	Kobunsha	NTV	Part of the Tetsujin 28-go franchise.
Scooby-Doo and Scrappy-Doo	1980–1982	Original	ABC	Part of the Scooby-Doo franchise.
Drak Pack	1980	Original	ABC	
The Flintstone Comedy Show	1980–1981	Original	ABC	Series featuring the superhero segment Captain Caveman.
Blackstar	1981	Original	CBS	
Danger Mouse	1981–1992	Original	ITV	
The New Adventures of Zorro	1981	Argosy	CBS	
Sport Billy	1981	Ladybird Books	NBC	
Superbook	1981–1982	Original	CBN	Series featuring stories from The Bible.
Space Stars	1981–1982	Original	NBC	Series featuring Space Ghost and The Herculoids.
Hero High	1981–1982	Original	NBC	Part of The Kid Super Power Hour with Shazam!.
Shirt Tales	1982–1984	Hallmark Cards	NBC	
Thunderbirds 2086	1982	Original	BBC 1	Anime based on the series Thunderbirds.
He-Man and the Masters of the Universe	1983–1985	Mattel	Syndication	Series based on the Masters of the Universe toyline.
Bananaman	1983–1988	DC Thomson	BBC	
SuperTed	1983–1986	Original	S4C	
G.I. Joe: A Real American Hero	1983–1986	Hasbro	Syndication	Series based on the toyline G.I. Joe: A Real American Hero.
Inspector Gadget	1983–1986	Original	Syndication	Part of the Inspector Gadget franchise.
Dungeons & Dragons	1983–1985	TSR	CBS	Series based on the role-playing game Dungeons & Dragons.
The New Scooby and Scrappy-Doo Show	1983–1984	Original	ABC	Part of the Scooby-Doo franchise.
Voltron	1984–1985	Original	Syndicated	Series containing footage of Beast King GoLion and Armored Fleet Dairugger XV.
Turbo Teen	1984–1985	Original	ABC	
The Transformers	1984–1987	Hasbro	Syndication	Series based on the Transformers toyline.
Fist of the North Star	1984–present	Shueisha	Fuji Television	Series based on the manga by Buronson and Tetsuo Hara.
Mighty Orbots	1984	Original	ABC	
Sherlock Hound	1984–1985	Ward Lock & Co	Nine Network	Series based on Sherlock Holmes.
Challenge of the GoBots	1984–1985	Tonka	Syndication	Series based on the Gobots toyline.
Wing-Man	1984–1985	Shueisha	TV Asahi	Series based on the manga by Masakazu Katsura.
She-Ra: Princess of Power	1985–1987	Mattel	Syndication	Spin-off of He-Man and the Masters of the Universe.
ThunderCats	1985–1989	Original	Syndication	
M.A.S.K.	1985–1986	Hasbro	Syndication	
Star Wars: Droids	1985–1986	Original	ABC	Part of the Star Wars franchise.
Star Wars: Ewoks	1985–1986	Original	ABC	Part of the Star Wars franchise.
The 13 Ghosts of Scooby-Doo	1985	Original	ABC	Part of the Scooby-Doo franchise.
Robotech	1985	Original	Syndication	
Galtar and the Golden Lance	1985–1986	Original	Syndication	Part of The Funtastic World of Hanna-Barbera.
Defenders of the Earth	1986–1987	King Features Syndicate	Syndication	The main title theme's lyrics were written by Stan Lee.
Saint Seiya	1986–1989	Shueisha	TV Asahi	Series based on the manga Saint Seiya.
Rambo: The Force of Freedom	1986	M. Evans	Syndication	Part of the Rambo franchise.
SilverHawks	1986	Original	Syndication	
The New Adventures of Jonny Quest	1986–1987	Original	Syndication	
Dragon Ball	1986–1996	Shueisha	Fuji TV	Series based on the manga Dragon Ball.
Inhumanoids	1986	Hasbro	Syndication	
The Real Ghostbusters	1986–1992	Original	ABC	Series based on the film Ghostbusters.
The Centurions	1986	Original	Syndication	
Karate Kommandos	1986	Original	Syndication	Series created by and featuring the voice of Chuck Norris.
The Adventures of the Galaxy Rangers	1986	Original	Syndication	
The Flintstone Kids'	1986–1987	Original	ABC	Series featuring the superhero segment Captain Caveman and Son.
Bionic Six	1987	Original	USA Network	Animated series loosely inspired by The Six Million Dollar Man and The Bionic Woman.
Teenage Mutant Ninja Turtles	1987–1996	Mirage Studios	Syndication / CBS	Based on the comic Teenage Mutant Ninja Turtles.
Mighty Mouse: The New Adventures	1987–1988	Original	CBS	Revival of Mighty Mouse.
Visionaries: Knights of the Magical Light	1987	Original	Syndication	
Transformers: Headmasters	1987–1988	Hasbro	NTV	Part of the Transformers franchise.
Popeye and Son	1987	King Features Syndicate	CBS	Series based on the comic strip Popeye by E.C. Segar.
Akakage	1987–1988	Original	NTV	
Bubblegum Crisis	1987–1991	Original	Syndication	
BraveStarr	1987–1988	Original	Syndication	
TigerSharks	1987	Original	Syndication	Part of The Comic Strip series.
RoboCop: The Animated Series	1988	Original	Syndication	Part of the RoboCop franchise.
Dino-Riders	1988	Original	Syndication	
Transformers: Super-God Masterforce	1988–1989	Hasbro	NTV	Part of the Transformers franchise.
Anpanman	1988–present	Froebel-kan	Nippon TV	Series based on the book by Takashi Yanase.
A Pup Named Scooby-Doo	1988–1991	Original	ABC	Part of Scooby-Doo franchise.
Dragon Ball Z	1989–1996	Shueisha	Fuji TV	Sequel to Dragon Ball.
Captain N: The Game Master	1989–1991	Nintendo	NBC	Series featuring various characters from Nintendo.
The Further Adventures of SuperTed	1989	Original	Syndication	Continuation of SuperTed.
G.I. Joe: A Real American Hero	1989–1992	Hasbro	Syndication	Continuation of G.I. Joe: A Real American Hero.
Transformers: Victory	1989–1990	Hasbro	NTV	Part of the Transformers franchise.
Super Mario Bros.	1989	Nintendo	Syndication	Animated segment of The Super Mario Bros. Super Show!
The Legend of Zelda	1989	Nintendo	Syndication	Series based on the video game The Legend of Zelda.
The Guyver: Bio-Booster Armor	1989–1992	Tokuma Shoten	Syndication	Series based on the manga Bio Booster Armor Guyver by Yoshiki Takaya.
Captain Planet and the Planeteers	1990–1996	Original	TBS	
The New Adventures of He-Man	1990	Mattel	Syndication	Continuation of He-Man and the Masters of the Universe.
The Adventures of Super Mario Bros. 3	1990	Nintendo	NBC	Series based on the video game Super Mario Bros. 3.
Toxic Crusaders	1990–1991	Original	Syndication	Series based on The Toxic Avenger films.
Samurai Pizza Cats	1990–1991	Original	Seven Network	American adaptation of the anime series Kyatto Ninden Teyandee.
AD Police Files	1990	Original	Syndication	Prequel to Bubblegum Crisis.
Darkwing Duck	1991–1995	Original	The Disney Channel	Series featuring characters from DuckTales.
Hammerman	1991	Original	ABC	Series starring MC Hammer.
Æon Flux	1991–1995	Original	MTV	
Bucky O'Hare and the Toad Wars	1991	Continuity Comics	BBC	
ProStars	1991	Original	NBC	Series featuring fictionalized versions of Michael Jordan, Bo Jackson and Wayne Gretzky.
James Bond Jr.	1991–1992	Jonathan Cape	Syndication	Part of the James Bond franchise.
The Legend of Prince Valiant	1991–1993	King Features Syndicate	The Family Channel	Series based on the comic strip Prince Valiant by Hal Foster.
Super Mario World	1991	Nintendo	NBC	Series based on the video game Super Mario World.
Bubblegum Crash	1991	Original	Syndication	Spin-off of Bubblegum Crisis.
Young Robin Hood	1991–1992	William Langland	Syndiction	Series based on the legend of Robin Hood.
The Adventures of T-Rex	1992–1993	Original	Syndication	
Conan the Adventurer	1992–1993	Weird Tales	Syndication	
Sailor Moon	1992–1993	Kodansha	TV Asahi	Adaptation of the manga Sailor Moon by Naoko Takeuchi.
King Arthur and the Knights of Justice	1992–1993	Matter of Britain	Syndication	Series based on the legend of King Arthur.
Tetsujin 28 FX	1992–1993	Kobunsha	NTV	Part of the Tetsujin 28-go franchise.
Giant Robo: The Day the Earth Stood Still	1992–1998	Shogakukan	Syndication	Series based on the manga Giant Robo by Mitsuteru Yokoyama.
Stunt Dawgs	1992–1993	Original	Syndication	
Wild West C.O.W.-Boys of Moo Mesa	1992–1993	Original	ABC	Series created by comic book artist Ryan Brown.
Tekkaman Blade	1992–1993	Original	TV Tokyo	Reboot of Tekkaman: The Space Knight.
SWAT Kats: The Radical Squadron	1993–1995	Original	TBS	
Stone Protectors	1993	Original	Syndication	Series based on the troll doll toyline.
Skeleton Warriors	1993–1994	Original	CBS	
Double Dragon	1993–1994	Technos Japan	Syndication	Series based on the video game Double Dragon.
Sonic the Hedgehog	1993–1994	Sega	ABC	Series based on the video game Sonic the Hedgehog.
The Adventures of Sonic the Hedgehog	1993	Sega	Syndication	Series based on the video game Sonic the Hedgehog.
Biker Mice from Mars	1993–1996	Original	Syndication	
Mighty Max	1993–1994	Bluebird Toys	Syndication	Series based on the Mighty Max toyline.
Exosquad	1993–1994	Original	Syndication	
The New Adventures of Speed Racer	1993–1994	Shueisha	Syndication	American adaptation of Speed Racer.
Cadillacs and Dinosaurs	1993–1994	Kitchen Sink Press	CBS	Series based on the comic book Xenozoic Tales by Mark Schultz.
The Tick	1994–1996	New England Comics	Fox	
The Head	1994–1996	Original	MTV	
Street Sharks	1994–1997	Original	Syndication	
Mega Man	1994–1996	Capcom	Syndication	Series based on the Mega Man video game.
Phantom 2040	1994–1996	King Features Syndicate	Syndication	
Creepy Crawlers	1994–1996	Mattel	Syndication	Series based on Creepy Crawlers.
Gargoyles	1994–1997	Original	ABC	Series produced by the Walt Disney Company.
Conan and the Young Warriors	1994	Weird Tales	CBS	
New Cutie Honey	1994–1995	Akita Shoten	Syndication	Part of the Cutie Honey franchise by Go Nagai.
Monster Force	1994	Original	Syndication	
Tekkaman Blade II	1994–1995	Original	Syndication	Sequel to Tekkaman Blade.
Space Ghost Coast to Coast	1994–2008	Original	TBS	Parody of Space Ghost.
ReBoot	1994–2001	Original	YTV	
Skysurfer Strike Force	1995–1996	Original	Syndication	
Highlander: The Animated Series	1994–1996	Original	USA Network	Part of the Highlander franchise.
Earthworm Jim	1995–1996	Shiny Entertainment	The WB	Series based on the video game Earthworm Jim.
Freakazoid!	1995–1997	Original	The WB	Series produced by Steven Spielberg.
Gadget Boy & Heather	1995–1998	Original	Syndication	Spin-off of Inspector Gadget, part of the Inspector Gadget franchise.
G.I. Joe Extreme	1995–1997	Hasbro	Syndication	Series based on the toyline G.I. Joe: A Real American Hero.
Action Man	1995–1996	Hasbro	Nickelodeon	Part of the Action Man franchise.
Street Fighter	1995–1997	Capcom	USA Network	Series based on the Street Fighter video game.
Street Fighter II V	1995	Capcom	Yomiuri TV	Series based on the Street Fighter video game.
The Adventures of Hyperman	1995–1996	Original	CBS	Series based on a PC game.
Road Rovers	1996–1997	Original	The WB	
Mighty Ducks	1996–1997	Original	ABC	Series loosely inspired by the Mighty Ducks film series.
Flash Gordon	1996–1997	King Features Syndicate	Syndication	Series based on the comic strip Flash Gordon by Alex Raymond.
Inspector Gadget's Field Trip	1996–1998	Original	The History Channel	Spin-off of Inspector Gadget, part of the Inspector Gadget franchise.
Kaiketsu Zorro	1996–1997	Argosy	NHK	
Mortal Kombat: Defenders of the Realm	1996	Midway Games	USA Network	Series based on the video game Mortal Kombat.
The Real Adventures of Jonny Quest	1996–1997	Original	Cartoon Network	
Dragon Ball GT	1996–1997	Shueisha	Fuji TV	Continuation of Dragon Ball Z.
Beast Wars	1996–1999	Hasbro	Syndication	Part of the Transformers franchise.
Dexter's Laboratory	1996–2003	Original	Cartoon Network	Series featuring superhero segments Dial M for Monkey and Justice Friends.
Rurouni Kenshin	1996–1998	Shueisha	Fuji TV	Series based on the manga Rurouni Kenshin by Nobuhiro Watsuki.
The Ambiguously Gay Duo	1996–2011	ABC	Original	Part of TV Funhouse.
Mutant Turtles: Superman Legend	1996	Mirage Studios	Syndication	Part of the Teenage Mutant Ninja Turtles franchise.
Extreme Ghostbusters	1997	Original	Syndication	Sequel to The Real Ghostbusters.
Mummies Alive!	1997	Original	Syndication	Series exec produced by director Ivan Reitman.
Extreme Dinosaurs	1997	Original	Syndication	Spin-off of Street Sharks.
The Magician	1997–1999	Original	France 2	
The New Adventures of Zorro	1997–1998	Argosy	Syndication	
Speed Racer X	1997	Shueisha	TV Tokyo	Reboot of Speed Racer.
Cutie Honey Flash	1997–1998	Akita Shoten	TV Asahi	Part of the Cutie Honey franchise.
The Adventures of Sam & Max: Freelance Police	1997–1998	Steve Purcell	Fox Kids	Series based on the comic franchise Sam & Max.
Van Pires	1997–1998	Original	Fox	
Revolutionary Girl Utena	1997	Original	TXN	
The X-Presidents	1997–2004	Original	NBC	Part of TV Funhouse.
The Powerpuff Girls	1998–2005	Original	Cartoon Network	
RoboCop: Alpha Commando	1998–1999	Original	Syndication	Series based on the RoboCop franchise.
Voltron: The Third Dimension	1998–2000	Original	Syndication	Sequel to Voltron.
Hercules	1998–1999	Original	ABC	Series based on the Disney film Hercules.
Bubblegum Crisis Tokyo 2040	1998–1999	Original	TV Tokyo	Reboot of Bubblegum Crisis.
Beast Wars II	1998–1999	Hasbro	TV Tokyo	Part of theTransformers franchise.
Godzilla: The Series	1998–2000	Original	Fox	Continuation of the Godzilla film.
Trigun	1998	Tokuma Shoten	TV Tokyo	Series based on the manga by Yasuhiro Nightow.
Devil Lady	1998–1999	Kodansha	MBS	Sequel to Devilman.
Cowboy Bebop	1998–2000	Original	TXN	
Sonic Underground	1999	Sega	TF1	Series based on the video game Sonic the Hedgehog.
Beast Wars Neo	1999	Hasbro	TV Tokyo	Part of the Transformers franchise.
Sherlock Holmes in the 22nd Century	1999–2001	Ward Lock & Co	Fox	Series featuring the character Sherlock Holmes created by Sir Arthur Conan Doyle.
Sabrina: The Animated Series	1999–2000	Archie Comics	UPN	Series based on the comic book Sabrina the Teenage Witch.
A.D. Police: To Protect and Serve	1999	Original	TV Tokyo	Spin-off of Bubblegum Crisis Tokyo 2040.
Cybersix	1999	Skorpio	Teletoon	Based on the comic strip by Carlos Meglia.
Mona the Vampire	1999–2006	Original	YTV	Based on the book of the same name.
Beast Machines	1999–2000	Hasbro	Fox	Part of the Transformers franchise.
Rescue Heroes	1999–2002	Fisher-Price	Teletoon	Series based on the toy-line Rescue Heroes.
Mega Babies	1999–2000	Original	Teletoon	
One Piece	1999–present	Shueisha	Fuji TV	Series based on the manga.
The Big O	1999–2003	Original	Wowow	
Journey to the West - Legends of the Monkey King	1999	Wu Cheng'en	China Central Television	Series based on the novel.
Max Steel	2000–2002	Mattel	The WB	Series based on the Max Steel toyline.
Transformers: Robots in Disguise	2000–2001	Hasbro	TV Tokyo	Part of the Transformers franchise.
Playboy's Dark Justice	2000–2001	Original	Playboy TV	
Buzz Lightyear of Star Command	2000–2001	Original	UPN	Series starring one of the main characters from Toy Story.
Jackie Chan Adventures	2000–2005	Original	The WB	Series featuring a fictionalized version of action star Jackie Chan.
Action Man	2000–2002	Hasbro	YTV	Part of the Action Man franchise.
Android Kikaider	2000–2001	Original	Kids Station	Animated reboot of Android Kikaider.
Butt-Ugly Martians	2001–2003	Original	CITV	
Cubix	2001–2004	Original	SBS	
Harvey Birdman, Attorney at Law	2000–2007	Original	Cartoon Network	Parody of Birdman and the Galaxy Trio and various other Hanna-Barbera series.
Aqua Teen Hunger Force	2000–2015	Original	Cartoon Network	Spin-off of Space Ghost: Coast to Coast.
Samurai Jack	2001–2017	Original	Cartoon Network	
s-CRY-ed	2001–2002	Original	TV Tokyo	
The Ripping Friends	2001–2002	Original	Fox	
Totally Spies!	2001–2025	Original	TF1	
The Brak Show	2001–2003	Original	Adult Swim	Spin-off of Space Ghost: Coast to Coast.
Cyborg 009 The Cyborg Soldier	2001–2002	Shueisha	TV Tokyo	Series based on the manga Cyborg 009.
The Legend of Tarzan	2001–2003	A.C. McClurg	UPN	
Gadget & the Gadgetinis	2001–2003	Original	YTV	Spin-off of Inspector Gadget, part of the Inspector Gadget franchise.
Rave Master	2001–2002	Kodansha	TBS	Series based on the manga by Hiro Mashima.
Kikaider 01: The Animation	2001–2002	Original	Syndication	Sequel to Android Kikaider.
Dan Dare: Pilot of the Future	2001	Hulton Press	Channel 5	Series based on the comic book Dan Dare by Frank Hampson.
Action League Now!	2001–2002	Original	Nickelodeon	Spin-off of All That and KaBlam!.
He-Man and the Masters of the Universe	2002–2004	Mattel	Cartoon Network	Reboot of He-Man and the Masters of the Universe.
MegaMan NT Warrior	2002–2006	Capcom	TV Tokyo	Series based on the Mega Man video game.
Teamo Supremo	2002–2004	Original	ABC	
Kim Possible	2002–2007	Original	Disney Channel	
Larryboy: The Cartoon Adventures	2002–2003	Original	NBC	Spin-off of the series VeggieTales.
ChalkZone	2002–2008	Original	Nickelodeon	
Naruto	2002–2007	Shueisha	TXN	Series based on the manga.
Tokyo Mew Mew	2002–2003	Kodansha	TXN	Series based on the manga Tokyo Mew Mew by Reiko Yoshida.
Transformers: Armada	2002–2003	Hasbro	TV Tokyo	Part of the Transformers franchise.
Ghost in the Shell: Stand Alone Complex	2002–2005	Kodansha	NTV	Series based on the manga Ghost in the Shell by Masamune Shirow.
Ozzy & Drix	2002–2004	Original	The WB	Continuation of the film Osmosis Jones.
Super Duper Sumos	2002–2003	Original	Nickelodeon	
What's New, Scooby-Doo?	2002–2006	Original	The WB	Part of the Scooby-Doo franchise.
Codename: Kids Next Door	2002–2008	Original	Cartoon Network	
Pigeon Boy	2002–2003	Original	France 3	
Sabrina's Secret Life	2003–2004	Archie Comics	Syndication	Spin-off of Sabrina: The Animated Series.
Teenage Mutant Ninja Turtles	2003–2009	Mirage Studios	Fox	Based on the comic book series by Kevin Eastman and Peter Laird.
Stripperella	2003–2004	Original	Spike	Series created by Stan Lee, based on Pamela Anderson.
My Life as a Teenage Robot	2003–2009	Original	Nickelodeon	Spin-off of Oh Yeah! Cartoons.
Code Lyoko	2003–2007	Original	France 3	
Astro Boy	2003–2004	Kobunsha	Fuji TV	Series based on the manga Astro Boy.
Sonic X	2003–2004	Sega	TV Tokyo	Series based on the video game Sonic the Hedgehog.
The Save-Ums!	2003–2005	Original	Discovery Kids	
Fullmetal Alchemist	2003–2004	Enix	JNN	Series based on the manga Fullmetal Alchemist.
Star Wars: Clone Wars	2003–2005	Original	Cartoon Network	Part of the Star Wars franchise.
Xiaolin Showdown	2003–2006	Original	The WB	
Duck Dodgers	2003–2005	Original	Cartoon Network	Series based on the Duck Dodgers shorts.
Parasite Dolls	2003	Original	Syndication	Part of the Bubblegum Crisis franchise.
R.O.D the TV	2003–2004	Shueisha	Fuji TV	Sequel to the series Read or Die.
Transformers: Energon	2004	Hasbro	TV Tokyo	Part of the Transformers franchise.
Blokhedz	2004	Street Legends Ink	Mission G	Series based on the comic book mini-series by the Madtwinz.
Futari wa Pretty Cure	2004–2005	Izumi Todo	TV Asahi	The first entry of the Pretty Cure franchise.
Danny Phantom	2004–2007	Original	Nickelodeon	
W.I.T.C.H.	2004–2006	Disney Italia	ABC Family	Series based on the comic book series W.I.T.C.H..
Atomic Betty	2004–2008	Original	Teletoon	
The Venture Bros.	2004–2018	Original	Cartoon Network	Part of Adult Swim.
Delta State	2004–2005	Original	Teletoon	
Angel Wars	2004–2007	Original	Syndication	
The Winx Club	2004–2015	Original	Rai 2	
Viewtiful Joe	2004–2005	Capcom	Jetix	Series based on the video game Viewtiful Joe.
Bleach	2004–2012	Shueisha	TV Tokyo	Series based on the manga Bleach.
Dragon Booster	2004–2006	Matter of Britain	Jetix	Series loosely based on the legend of King Arthur.
Tetsujin 28-go	2004	Kobunsha	TV Tokyo	Part of the Tetsujin 28-go franchise.
Megas XLR	2004–2005	Original	Cartoon Network	
Zeroman	2004	Original	Teletoon	
Super Robot Monkey Team Hyperforce Go!	2004–2006	Original	Jetix	
Drawn Together	2004–2007	Original	Comedy Central	Series parodying various cartoon characters.
Santo vs The Clones	2004	Original	Cartoon Network Mexico	Animated series featuring wrestler El Santo.
Commander Safeguard	2005–present	Original	Various	Based on the Safeguard soaps by P&G.
Transformers: Cybertron	2005	Hasbro	TV Tokyo	Part of the Transformers franchise.
American Dragon: Jake Long	2005–2007	Original	Disney Channel	
Avatar: The Last Airbender	2005–2008	Original	Nickelodeon	
The Life and Times of Juniper Lee	2005–2007	Original	Cartoon Network	Series created by Judd Winick.
Legend of the Dragon	2005–2008	Original	CBBC	
Class of the Titans	2005–2008	Original	Teletoon	Series featuring characters from Greek mythology.
Guyver: The Bioboosted Armor	2005–2006	Tokuma Shoten	Wowow	Series based on the manga Bio Booster Armor Guyver.
A.T.O.M.	2005–2007	Hasbro	Jetix	Part of the Action Man franchise.
Danger Rangers	2005–2006	Original	PBS	
G.I. Joe: Sigma 6	2005–2007	Hasbro	Fox	Series based on the toyline G.I. Joe: A Real American Hero.
The Invisible Man	2005	C. Arthur Pearson	Rai 2	Series loosely based on the book The Invisible Man.
Loonatics Unleashed	2005–2007	Original	The CW	Series featuring characters based on Looney Tunes.
Blood+	2005–2006	Original	Animax	Series loosely based on the anime film Blood: The Last Vampire.
Acadieman	2005–2009	Original	Rogers TV	
Robotboy	2005–2008	Original	Cartoon Network	
Minoriteam	2005–2006	Original	Cartoon Network	Part of Adult Swim.
The X's	2005–2006	Original	Nickelodeon	
Ben 10	2005–2008	Original	Cartoon Network	
Johnny Test	2005–2014	Original	The CW	
Ultimate Girls	2005	Original	Chiba TV	
Captain Flamingo	2006–2008	Original	YTV	
Wonder Pets!	2006–2016	Original	Nickelodeon	
WordGirl	2006–2015	Original	PBS	
Eon Kid	2006–2007	Original	KBS	
Biker Mice from Mars	2006–2007	Original	GMTV	Continuation of Biker Mice from Mars.
Zorro: Generation Z	2006	Argosy	Telemundo	
Saiyuki	2006	Madman Entertainment	Fuji TV	Anime based on the manga Saiyuki, which is loosely based on the novel Journey to the West.
Kappa Mikey	2006–2008	Original	Nicktoons	
Powerpuff Girls Z	2006–2007	Original	TV Tokyo	Anime adaptation of The Powerpuff Girls.
Freak Show	2006	Original	Comedy Central	
Frisky Dingo	2006–2008	Original	Cartoon Network	Part of Adult Swim.
Yin Yang Yo!	2006–2009	Original	Jetix	
Shaggy & Scooby-Doo Get a Clue!	2006–2008	Original	The CW	Part of the Scooby-Doo franchise.
Z-Squad	2006–2007	Original	SBS	
Humanoid Monster Bem	2006	Original	Animax	Remake of Humanoid Monster Bem.
DinoSquad	2007–2008	Original	CBS	
SamSam	2007–2013	Original	France 5	
El Tigre: The Adventures of Manny Rivera	2007–2008	Original	Nickelodeon	
Sushi Pack	2007–2009	Original	CBS	
Revisioned: Tomb Raider Animated Series	2007	Core Design	GameTap	Series based on the Tomb Raider video game series.
Naruto: Shippuden	2007–2017	Shueisha	TV Tokyo	Continuation of Naruto.
Transformers: Animated	2007–2009	Hasbro	Cartoon Network	Part of the Transformers franchise.
Darker than Black	2007	Original	JNN	
Afro Samurai	2007	Tor/Seven Seas	WOWOW	Series based on the manga by Takashi Okazaki. The main character is voiced by actor Samuel L. Jackson.
GR: Giant Robo	2007	Shogakukan	SKY PerfecTV!	Part of the Giant Robo franchise.
Supernormal	2007–2008	Original	CITV	
Infinite Quest	2007	Original	BBC Two	Part of the Doctor Who franchise.
Super Why!	2007–2016	Original	PBS Kids	
Phineas and Ferb	2007–2015	Original	Disney Channel	Series featuring the superhero Agent P.
Ben 10: Alien Force	2008–2010	Original	Cartoon Network	
Casshern Sins	2008–2009	Comic Rush	TV Saitama	Reboot of Casshan.
Astro Fighter Sunred	2008–2010	Square Enix	Kids Station	Series based on the manga of the same name.
The New Adventures of Nanoboy	2008–2013	Original	Starz	
Star Wars: The Clone Wars	2008–2014	Original	Cartoon Network	Part of the Star Wars franchise.
Three Delivery	2008–2009	Original	Nicktoons	
Speed Racer: The Next Generation	2008–2013	Shueisha	Nicktoons	Sequel to Speed Racer.
Battle Pope	2008	Funk-O-Tron	Spike	Series based on the comic book by Robert Kirkman.
Mega Man Star Force	2008–2009	Capcom	Cartoon Network	Series based on the video game Mega Man Star Force.
Max Steel Turbo Missions	2008–2011	Mattel	Syndication	Continuation of Max Steel.
Chop Socky Chooks	2008–2009	Original	Cartoon Network	
The Mighty B!	2008–2011	Original	Nickelodeon	Series co-created and voiced by actress/comedian Amy Poehler.
The Secret Saturdays	2008–2010	Original	Cartoon Network	
Titan Maximum	2009	Original	Cartoon Network	Parody of various anime.
Fanboy & Chum Chum	2009–2014	Original	Nickelodeon	
G.I. Joe: Resolute	2009	Hasbro	Cartoon Network	Series based on the toyline G.I. Joe: A Real American Hero.
Fullmetal Alchemist: Brotherhood	2009–2010	Enix	JNN	Series based on the manga Fullmetal Alchemist.
A Certain Scientific Railgun	2009–2010	ASCII Media Works	Syndication	
Noonbory and the Super Seven	2009	Original	Knowledge Network	
League of Super Evil	2009–2012	Original	YTV	
Dreamland	2009	Original	BBC One	Part of the Doctor Who franchise.
Cosmic Quantum Ray	2009–2010	Original	KiKa	
Ben 10: Ultimate Alien	2010–2012	Original	Cartoon Network	
Adventure Time	2010–2018	Original	Cartoon Network	
Zevo-3	2010–2011	Original	Nicktoons	Series featuring characters based on Skechers.
Sidekick	2010–2013	Original	YTV	
Captain Biceps	2010–2011	Glénat Editions	France 3	Based on the French comic series Captain Biceps
G.I. Joe: Renegades	2010–2011	Hasbro	The Hub	Series based on the toyline G.I. Joe: A Real American Hero.
Transformers: Prime	2010–2013	Hasbro	The Hub	Part of the Transformers franchise.
Heroman	2010	Square Enix	TXN	Series based on a manga co-created by Stan Lee.
NFL Rush Zone	2010–2014	Original	Nicktoons	Series involving the NFL.
Sym-Bionic Titan	2010–2011	Original	Cartoon Network	
Scooby-Doo! Mystery Incorporated	2010–2013	Original	Cartoon Network	Part of the Scooby-Doo franchise.
Team Umizoomi	2010–2015	Original	Nick Jr	
T.U.F.F. Puppy	2010–2015	Original	Nickelodeon	
Chuck Chicken	2010	Original	TV9	
Ninjago: Masters of Spinjitzu	2011–present	Original	Cartoon Network	
Suite PreCure	2011–2012	Izumi Todo	TV Asahi	Part of the Pretty Cure franchise.
BoBoiBoy	2011–2016	Original	TV3	
Tiger & Bunny	2011	Original	BS11	
Voltron Force	2011–2012	Original	Nicktoons	Sequel to Voltron.
ThunderCats	2011–2012	Original	Cartoon Network	Reboot of ThunderCats.
Kung Fu Panda: Legends of Awesomeness	2011–2016	Original	Nickelodeon	Part of the Kung Fu Panda franchise.
Mighty Raju	2011– present	Original	Pogo TV	Part of the Chhota Bheem franchise.
The 99	2011–2012	Teshkeel Comics	The Hub	Series based on the comic book The 99.
Bondi Band	2011–2012	Original	Cartoon Network	
Superbook	2011–2021	Original	Tokyo MX	Reboot of Superbook.
Shaktimaan: The Animated Series	2011–2012	Original	Nickelodeon Sonic	An animated adaptation of Shaktimaan.
Puella Magi Madoka Magica	2011	Original	JNN	
Blood-C	2011	Original	MBS TV	Part of the Blood: The Last Vampire franchise.
The Adventures of Puss in Boots	2015–2018	Original	Netflix	Prequel to the film Puss in Boots.
Smile PreCure!	2012–2013	Izumi Todo	TV Asahi	Also known as Glitter Force, Part of the Pretty Cure franchise.
Transformers: Rescue Bots	2012–2016	Hasbro	The Hub	Part of the Transformers franchise.
Monsuno	2012–2014	Original	Nicktoons	
Zetman	2012	Shueisha	Yomiuri TV	Based on the manga of the same name.
The Legend of Korra	2012–2014	Original	Nickelodeon	Sequel to Avatar: The Last Airbender.
Tron: Uprising	2012–2013	Original	Disney XD	Part of the Tron franchise.
Black Dynamite	2012–2015	Original	Cartoon Network	Series based on the film Black Dynamite. Part of Adult Swim.
Ben 10: Omniverse	2012–2014	Original	Cartoon Network	
Randy Cunningham: 9th Grade Ninja	2012–2015	Original	Disney XD	
Teenage Mutant Ninja Turtles	2012–2017	Mirage Studios	Nickelodeon	Based on the comic book series by Kevin Eastman and Peter Laird.
JoJo's Bizarre Adventure	2012–2016	Shueisha	Tokyo MX	Series based on the manga JoJo's Bizarre Adventure by Hirohiko Araki.
Bravest Warriors	2012–2018	Original	YouTube	
SuperFuckers	2012–2013	Top Shelf Productions	Cartoon Hangover	Animated series based on the comic book by James Kochalka.
Saint Seiya Omega	2012–2014	Shueisha	TV Asahi	Series based on the manga Saint Seiya.
SheZow	2012–2013	Original	Network Ten	
World of Winx	2012–2015	Original	Netflix	Spin-off of Winx Club.
Nutri Ventures - The Quest for the 7 Kingdoms	2013–2015	Original	RTP2	
Max Steel	2013–2015	Mattel	Disney XD	Series based on the Max Steel toyline.
Vividred Operation	2013	Original	MBS	
Sabrina: Secrets of a Teenage Witch	2013–2014	Archie Comics	The Hub	Series based on the comic book Sabrina the Teenage Witch.
Samurai Flamenco	2013–2014	Square Enix	Fuji TV	
The Awesomes	2013–2015	Original	Hulu	
Steven Universe	2013–2019	Original	Cartoon Network	
RWBY	2013–present	Original	Rooster Teeth	
Transformers Go!	2013–2014	Hasbro	Syndication	Part of the Transformers franchise.
Pac-Man and the Ghostly Adventures	2013–2016	Namco	Disney XD	Series based on the video game Pac-Man.
Xiaolin Chronicles	2013–2015	Original	Disney XD	Sequel to Xiaolin Showdown.
Burka Avenger	2013–2016	Original	Nick Pakistan	
Tenkai Knights	2013–2015	Original	TV Tokyo	
Monsters vs. Aliens	2013–2014	Original	Nickelodeon	Continuation of the film Monsters vs. Aliens.
ViR: The Robot Boy	2013–2016	Original	Hungama TV	
The Adventures of Napkin Man!	2013–2017	Original	CBC Television	
Paw Patrol	2013–present	Original	Nickelodeon	
Gatchaman Crowds	2013–2015	Original	Nippon TV	Part of the Gatchaman franchise.
Dr. Dimensionpants	2014–2015	Original	Teletoon	
Major Lazer	2015	Original	FXX	Part of Animation Domination High-Def.
Sonic Boom	2014–2017	Sega	Cartoon Network	Series based on the video game Sonic the Hedgehog.
Parasyte	2014–2015	Kodansha	NTV	Series based on the manga by Hitoshi Iwaaki.
Tokyo Ghoul	2014–2015	Shueisha	Tokyo MX	Series adapted from the manga by Sui Ishida.
Tokyo ESP	2014	Kadokawa Shoten	Tokyo MX	Series based on the manga Tokyo ESP by Hajime Segawa.
Kagagi	2014	Jay Odjick	APTN	Series based on the comic of the same name.
Star Wars Rebels	2014–2018	Original	Disney XD	Part of the Star Wars franchise.
Penn Zero: Part-Time Hero	2014–2017	Original	Disney XD	
Kicko & Super Speedo	2014	Original	Sony Yay	
Robin Hood: Mischief in Sherwood	2014–2019	Original	Discovery Family	Based on the legendary Robin Hood.
Garo: The Animation	2014–2018	Original	TXN	Part of the Garo franchise.
Inspector Gadget	2015–2018	Original	Teletoon	Reboot of Inspector Gadget, part of the Inspector Gadget franchise.
Star vs. the Forces of Evil	2015–2019	Original	Disney XD	
Go! Princess PreCure	2015–2016	Izumi Todo	TV Asahi	Part of the Pretty Cure franchise.
Transformers: Robots in Disguise	2015–2017	Hasbro	Cartoon Network	Part of the Transformers franchise.
Thunderbirds Are Go	2015–2020	Original	ITV	Reboot of Thunderbirds.
El Chapulín Colorado Animado	2015–2017	Original	Canal 5	An animated version of El Chapulín Colorado.
Mighty Magiswords	2015–2019	Original	Cartoon Network Video	
Dragon Ball Super	2015–2018	Shueisha	Fuji TV	Series set after Dragon Ball Z and Dragon Ball GT.
Miraculous: Tales of Ladybug & Cat Noir	2015–present	Original	TF1	
Infini-T Force	2015–2020	Original	ytv	Crossover series.
PJ Masks	2015–present	Original	Disney Junior	
Danger Mouse	2015–2019	Original	CBBC	Reboot of Danger Mouse.
Be Cool, Scooby-Doo!	2015–2018	Original	Cartoon Network	Part of the Scooby-Doo franchise.
One-Punch Man	2015–present	Shueisha	Cartoon Network	
Ghost in the Shell: Arise – Alternative Architecture	2015	Kodansha	Tokyo MX	Series based on the manga Ghost in the Shell.
Zorro: The Chronicles	2015	Argosy	Hulu	Part of the Zorro franchise.
Cyborg 009 VS Devilman	2015–2016	Kodansha	Netflix	Crossover mini-series.
SuperMansion	2015–2019	Original	Crackle	
Supernoobs	2015–2019	Original	Teletoon	
Shiva	2015–present	Original	Nickelodeon	
Go Jetters	2015–2020	Original	CBeebies	
Charlotte	2015	Original	Tokyo MX	
OK K.O.! Let's Be Heroes	2016–2019	Original	Cartoon Network	
Fangbone!	2016–2017	G.P. Putnam's Sons	Disney	Series based on the books by Michael Rex.
Witchy PreCure!	2016–2017	Izumi Todo	TV Asahi	Part of the Pretty Cure franchise.
My Hero Academia	2016–present	Shueisha	JNN	Series based on the manga by Kohei Horikoshi.
Sailor Moon Crystal	2016	Kodansha	Tokyo MX	Part of the Sailor Moon franchise.
The Powerpuff Girls	2016–2019	Original	Cartoon Network	Reboot of The Powerpuff Girls.
RWBY Chibi	2016–present	Original	Rooster Teeth	Spin-off of RWBY.
Voltron: Legendary Defender	2016–2018	Original	Netflix	Reboot of Voltron.
Mob Psycho 100	2016–2022	Shogakukan	TV Tokyo	Series based on the web manga by One.
Atomic Puppet	2016–2017	Original	Teletoon	
Transformers: Combiner Wars	2016	Hasbro	go90	Part of the Transformers franchise.
Cyborg 009 VS Devilman	2015–2016	Kodansha	Netflix	Crossover mini-series.
Ben 10	2016–2021	Original	Cartoon Network	Reboot of Ben 10.
Astra Force	2016–2017	Original	Disney Channel	
Zak Storm	2016–present	Original	Discovery Family	
Ejen Ali	2016–2023	Original	TV3	
Trollhunters: Tales of Arcadia	2016–2018	Disney-Hyperion / Hot Key Books	Netflix	Series based on the novel Trollhunters by Guillermo del Toro and Daniel Kraus.
Overwatch	2016–2018	Blizzard Entertainment	YouTube	Series based on the Overwatch video game.
BoBoiBoy Galaxy	2016–2018	Original	TV3	Sequel to the series BoBoiBoy.
To Be Hero	2018–2023	Original	Tokyo MX	
Tarzan and Jane	2017–2018	A.C. McClurg	Netflix	
Star Wars Forces of Destiny	2017–2018	Original	YouTube	Part of the Star Wars franchise.
Apollo Gauntlet	2017	Original	Cartoon Network	Part of Adult Swim.
Mysticons	2017–2018	Original	Nickelodeon	
Stretch Armstrong and the Flex Fighters	2017–2018	Hasbro	Netflix	Series based on the Stretch Armstrong action figure.
Boruto: Naruto Next Generations	2017–2023	Shueisha	TV Tokyo	Spin-off of Naruto.
Castlevania	2017–2021	Konami	Netflix	Series based on the video game Castlevania.
The Reflection	2017	Original	NHK General TV	Series co-created by Stan Lee.
Yom	2017	Original	Disney Channel India	
Neo Yokio	2017–2018	Original	Netflix	Series created by musician Ezra Koenig.
Inuyashiki	2017	Kodansha	Fuji TV	Series based on the manga Inuyashiki by Hiroya Oku.
Devilman Crybaby	2018	Kodansha	Netflix	Series based on the manga Devilman by Go Nagai.
3Below: Tales of Arcadia	2018–2019	Disney-Hyperion / Hot Key Books	Netflix	Part of the Trollhunters: Tales of Arcadia franchise.
The Adventures of Kid Danger	2018	Original	Nickelodeon	Animated spin-off of Henry Danger.
Spy Kids: Mission Critical	2018	Original	Netflix	Series based on the Spy Kids franchise.
The Epic Tales of Captain Underpants	2018–2020	Scholastic Corporation	Netflix	Series based on the Captain Underpants book series by Dav Pilkey.
Rise of the Teenage Mutant Ninja Turtles	2018–2020	Mirage Studios	Nickelodeon	Series based on the comic book Teenage Mutant Ninja Turtles by Kevin Eastman and Peter Laird.
Mega Man: Fully Charged	2018–2019	Capcom	Cartoon Network	Series based on the video game Mega Man.
Transformers: Cyberverse	2018–2021	Hasbro	Cartoon Network	Part of the Transformers franchise.
Star Wars Resistance	2018–2020	Original	Disney Channel	Part of the Star Wars franchise.
She-Ra and the Princesses of Power	2018–2020	Mattel	Netflix	Reboot of She-Ra: Princess of Power.
Cutie Honey Universe	2018	Akita Shoten	AT-X	Part of the Cutie Honey franchise.
Super Dragon Ball Heroes	2018–present	Shueisha	Syndicated	Part of the Dragon Ball franchise.
Kung Fu Panda: The Paws of Destiny	2018–2019	Original	Amazon Video	Series based on the Kung Fu Panda franchise.
Rainbow Rangers	2018–2022	Original	Nick Jr.	
Super Drags	2018	Original	Netflix	
Little Singham	2018–present	Original	Discovery Kids	Series based on the film Singham.
Transformers: Rescue Bots Academy	2019–2021	Hasbro	Discovery Family	Part of the Transformers franchise.
SSSS.Gridman	2019–2022	Original	Wowow	
Carmen Sandiego	2019–2021	Broderbund	Netflix	Series based on the video game Carmen Sandiego.
Star Twinkle PreCure	2019–2020	Izumi Todo	ANN	Part of the Pretty Cure franchise.
Costume Quest	2019	Double Fine	Amazon Video	Series based on the video game Costume Quest.
Mao Mao: Heroes of Pure Heart	2019–2020	Original	Cartoon Network	
Ultraman	2019–present	Tsuburaya Productions	Netflix	Part of the Ultraman franchise.
Scooby-Doo and Guess Who?	2019–2021	Original	Boomerang	Part of the Scooby-Doo franchise.
Knights of the Zodiac: Saint Seiya	2019–present	Shueisha	Netflix	Series based on the manga Saint Seiya.
Power Players	2019	Original	Cartoon Network	
Seis Manos	2019	Original	Netflix	
D.N. Ace	2019–2020	Original	Teletoon	
Bem	2019	Original	TV Tokyo	Remake of Humanoid Monster Bem
Case File nº221: Kabukicho	2019–2020	Ward Lock & Co	Hulu	Series based on the character Sherlock Holmes.
Twelve Forever	2019	Original	Netflix	
The Rocketeer	2019–2020	Pacific Comics	Disney Junior	Series based on the comic The Rocketeer by Dave Stevens.
ThunderCats Roar	2020	Original	Cartoon Network	Part of the ThunderCats franchise.
Steven Universe Future	2019–2022	Original	Cartoon Network	Epilogue of Steven Universe and Steven Universe: The Movie.
Ghost in the Shell: SAC_2045	2020	Kodansha	Netflix	Series based on the manga Ghost in the Shell.
Powerbirds	2020	Original	Universal Kids	
StarBeam	2020–2021	Original	Netflix	
Hero Elementary	2020–2022	Original	PBS	
Transformers: War for Cybertron Trilogy	2020–2021	Hasbro	Netflix	Part of the Transformers franchise.
Super HxEros	2020	Shueisha	Tokyo MX	
Kipo and the Age of Wonderbeasts	2020	Rad	Netflix	Series based on the webcomic "Kipo".
Wizards: Tales of Arcadia	2020	Disney-Hyperion / Hot Key Books	Netflix	Part of the Trollhunters: Tales of Arcadia franchise.
Cleopatra in Space	2020–2021	Graphix	Peacock	Series based on the graphic novel Cleopatra in Space.
Magical Girl Friendship Squad: Origins	2020	Original	Syfy	Pilot series to Magical Girl Friendship Squad.
The Owl House	2020–2023	Original	Disney Channel	
Adventure Time: Distant Lands	2020–2021	Original	Max	Part of the Adventure Time franchise.
Magical Girl Friendship Squad	2020	Original	Syfy	
Star Trek: Lower Decks	2020–2024	Original	Paramount+	Part of the Star Trek franchise.
Kid Cosmic	2021–2022	Original	Netflix	
Birdgirl	2021–2022	Original	Cartoon Network	Spin-off of the series Harvey Birdman, Attorney at Law.
Invincible	2021–present	Original	Amazon Studios	
Stan Lee's Superhero Kindergarten	2021–present	Original	Kartoon Channel	
Star Wars: The Bad Batch	2021– present	Original	Disney+	Part of the Star Wars franchise.
Trese	2021	Alamat Comics	Netflix	Series based on the comic Trese by Budgette Tan and Kajo Baldisimo.
Resident Evil: Infinite Darkness	2021	Capcom	Netflix	Part of the Resident Evil franchise.
Brave Animated Series	2021–present	Yellow Book	PTS	Series based on the comic of the same name.
Johnny Test	2021–2022	Original	Netflix	Revival of the series Johnny Test.
Masters of the Universe: Revelation	2021	Mattel	Netflix	Part of the Masters of the Universe franchise.
Q-Force	2021	Original	Netflix	
He-Man and the Masters of the Universe	2021	Mattel	Netflix	Part of the Masters of the Universe franchise.
Arcane	2021–2024	Riot Games	Netflix	Series based on the video game League of Legends.
Star Trek: Prodigy	2021–2022	Original	Paramount+	Part of the Star Trek franchise.
Star Wars: Visions	2021	Original	Disney+	Part of the Star Wars franchise.
Villainous	2021– present	Original	HBO Max Latin America	
Ghostforce	2021–present	Original	TFOU	
Mechamato	2021–2023	Original	Cartoon Network Asia	Part of the BoBoiBoy franchise.
Jellystone!	2021–2025	Original	Max	Series featuring various superheroes from Hanna-Barbera.
Action Pack	2022	Original	Netflix	
The Legend of Vox Machina	2022–present	Original	Amazon Prime Video	Series based on the web series Critical Role.
Transformers: BotBots	2022–present	Hasbro	Netflix	Part of the Transformers franchise.
Team Zenko Go	2022–present	Original	Netflix	
Kung Fu Panda: The Dragon Knight	2022–2023	Original	Netflix	Part of the Kung Fu Panda franchise.
Super Giant Robot Brothers	2022–present	Original	Netflix	
Hamster & Gretel	2022–2025	Original	Disney Channel	
Tales of the Jedi	2022–present	Original	Disney+	Part of the Star Wars franchise.
Spirit Rangers	2022–2024	Original	Netflix	
Chainsaw Man	2022	Shueisha	TXN	Series based on the manga Chainsaw Man
Transformers: EarthSpark	2022–present	Hasbro	Paramount+	Part of the Transformers franchise.
Bleach: Thousand-Year Blood War	2022–present	Shueisha	Hulu	Sequel to the television series Bleach.
Sonic Prime'	2022–2024	Sega	Netflix	Part of the Sonic the Hedgehog franchise.
Tokyo Mew Mew New	2022–present	TV Tokyo	Part of the Tokyo Mew Mew franchise.	
The Boys Presents: Diabolical	2022	Dynamite Entertainment	Prime Video	Animated spin-off of the television series The Boys.
Jade Armor	2022–present	Original	HBO Max/Cartoon Network	
Mecha Builders	2022–present	Original	Cartoon Network	Animated spin-off of Sesame Street.
Vindiactors 2	2022	Original	YouTube	Spin-off of the television series Rick and Morty.
Chibiverse	2022–present	Original	Disney Channel	Series featuring various Disney superheroes.
SuperKitties	2023–present	Original	Disney Junior	
Velma	2023–2024	Original	HBO Max	Part of the Scooby-Doo franchise.
Koala Man	2023	Original	Hulu	
Trigun Stampede	2023–present	Tokuma Shoten	TXN	Sequel to Trigun.
My Dad the Bounty Hunter	2023	Original	Netflix	
Agent Elvis	2023	Original	Netflix	Series featuring a fictionalized Elvis Presley.
Kiya & the Kimoja Heroes	2023–2024	Original	Disney Junior	
Star Wars: Young Jedi Adventures	2023–present	Original	Disney+	Part of the Star Wars franchise.
Unicorn: Warriors Eternal	2023	Original	Adult Swim	
Supa Team 4	2023–present	Original	Netflix	
Fright Krewe	2023–2024	Original	Peacock	Series co-created by horror director Eli Roth.
God's Gang	2023–present	Original	YouTube	
Shy	2023	Akita Shoten	TV Tokyo	
Bastions	2023	Original	Crunchyroll	
Rurouni Kenshin	2023–present	Shueisha	Fuji TV	Series based on the manga Rurouni Kenshin.
Blue Eye Samurai	2023–present	Original	Netflix	
Masters of the Universe: Revolution	2024	Mattel	Netflix	Sequel to Masters of the Universe: Revelation.
Megamind Rules!	2024–present	Original	Peacock	Part of the Megamind franchise.
Go! Go! Loser Ranger!	2024–present	Kodansha	JNN	
Tales of the Teenage Mutant Ninja Turtles	2024–2025	Mirage Studios	Paramount+	Continuation of the film Teenage Mutant Ninja Turtles: Mutant Mayhem.
Tomb Raider: The Legend of Lara Croft	2024-2025	Eidos Interactive	Netflix	Part of the Tomb Raider franchise.
Dragon Ball Daima	2024	Shueisha	Fuji TV	Part of the Dragon Ball franchise.
Magilumiere Magical Girls Inc.	2024–present	Shueisha	NNS	Series based on the manga Magilumiere Magical Girls Inc.
My Hero Academia: Vigilantes	2025–present	Shueisha	Tokyo MX	Prequel to My Hero Academia.
To Be Hero X	2025–present	Original	Fuji TV	Part of the To Be Hero franchise.
Super Duper Bunny League	2025–present	Jamie Smart	Nickelodeon	Series based on the comic Superhero Bunny League.
Winx Club: The Magic Is Back	2025–present	Original	Rai 2	Part of the Winx Club franchise.
Super Team Canada	2025	Original	Crave	
Stranger Things: Tales from '85	2026	Original	Netflix	Part of the Stranger Things franchise.
Star Wars: Maul – Shadow Lord	2026–present	Original	Disney+	Part of the Star Wars franchise.
The Ghost in the Shell	2026–present	Kodansha	FNS	Series based on the manga Ghost in the Shell.
President Curtis	2026–present	Original	Adult Swim	Spin-off of Rick and Morty
The One Piece	2026–present	Shueisha	Netflix	Part of the One Piece franchise.
Avatar: Seven Havens	TBA	Original	Paramount+	Part of the Avatar: The Last Airbender franchise.
Dragon Ball Super: Beerus	2026—present	Shueisha	Fuji Television	Part of the Dragon Ball franchise.

== See also ==
- List of television programs based on comics
- List of superhero filmsb+
