= List of American superhero TV shows =

This is a list of comic superhero TV shows produced by American studios by year to the present.

== Live-action ==
Title	Original airing	Seasons	Episodes	Network(s)	Publisher	Notes	Ref.
Dick Tracy	1950–51	2	48	ABC	Chicago Tribune New York Syndicate	Series featuring the comic character Dick Tracy.	
Adventures of Superman	1952–1958	6	104	Syndication	DC Comics		
Terry and the Pirates	1953	1	18	Syndication	Chicago Tribune New York Syndicate	Series based on the comic Terry and the Pirates.	
Flash Gordon	1954–56	1	39	Syndication	King Features Syndicate	Series based on the comic character Flash Gordon.	
Jungle Jim	1955–56	1	26	Syndication	King Features Syndicate	Series based on the comic character Jungle Jim.	
Sheena, Queen of the Jungle	1956–57	1	26	Syndication	Fiction House	Series based on the comic character Sheena, Queen of the Jungle.	
Zorro	1957–59	2	78	ABC	Argosy / Disney comics	Series featuring the character Zorro.	
Steve Canyon	1958–59	1	34	NBC	Field Enterprises / Publishers-Hall Syndicate / King Features Syndicate	Series featuring the character Steve Canyon.	
Batman	1966–1968	3	120	ABC	DC Comics		
The Green Hornet	1966–67	1	26	ABC	Holyoke Publishing / NOW Comics		
Spidey Super Stories	1974–1977	3	29	PBS	Marvel Comics		
Shazam!	1974–1976	3	28	CBS	DC Comics		
The Secrets of Isis	1975–76	2	22	CBS	DC Comics		
Wonder Woman	1975–1979	3	60 (with pilots)	ABC (season 1); CBS (seasons 2–3)	DC Comics		
The Amazing Spider-Man	1977–1979	2	13	CBS	Marvel Comics	Started with a television film.	
The Incredible Hulk	1977–1982	5	80	CBS	Marvel Comics	Started with 2 television films and ended with 3 television films post series between 1988 and 1990	
Buck Rogers in the 25th Century	1979–1981	2	37	NBC	John F. Dille Co.	Series based on the comic character Buck Rogers.	
Legends of the Superheroes	1979	1	2	NBC	DC Comics	Two-part television special	
Zorro and Son	1983	1	5	CBS	Argosy / Disney comics	Series featuring the character Zorro.	
Sable	1987–88	1	7	ABC	First Comics	Series based on the comic character Jon Sable.	
Superboy	1988–1992	4	100	Syndication	DC Comics		
Swamp Thing	1990–1993	3	72	USA Network	DC Comics		
The Flash	1990–91	1	22	CBS	DC Comics	Adjacent to the Arrowverse.	
Zorro	1990–93	4	88	The Family Channel	Argosy / Disney comics	Series featuring the character Zorro.	
M.A.N.T.I.S.	1994	1	22	Fox	Original		
Human Target	1992	1	7	ABC	DC Comics		
Lucky Luke	1992	1	8	Canale 5	Dupuis / Dargaud / Lucky Productions / Lucky Comics	Series featuring the comic character Lucky Luke	
Lois & Clark: The New Adventures of Superman	1993–1997	4	88	ABC	DC Comics		
Mortal Kombat: Conquest	1998–99	1	22	Midway Games / WMS Industries / Warner Bros. Games	Broadcast Syndication	Series based on the video game Mortal Kombat	
Weird Science	1993–98	5	88	USA Network	EC Comics	Series based on the comic Weird Science and the movie of the same name.	
Wild Palms	1993	1	6	ABC	Details		
Highlander: The Series	1992-1998	6	119	Broadcast Syndication	Original	Part of the Highlander franchise.	
The Crow: Stairway to Heaven	1998-1999	1	22	Broadcast Syndication	Caliber Comics / IDW / Image Comics	Part of The Crow franchise.	
Sabrina the Teenage Witch	1996–2003	7	163	ABC / The WB	Archie Comics	Series featuring the comic characeter Sabrina Spellman.	
Robocop	1994	1	21	CTV	Original	Part of the Robocop franchise.	
Night Man	1997–1999	2	44	Syndication	Malibu Comics / Marvel Comics		
Timecop	1997–98	1	9	ABC	Dark Horse Comics		
Ninja Turtles: The Next Mutation	1997–98	1	26	Fox Kids	Mirage Studios / IDW Publishing	Series based on the Teenage Mutant Ninja Turtles comic.	
Conan the Adventurer	1997–98	1	22	Syndication	Marvel Comics / Weird Tales	Series featuring the character Conan the Barbarian.	
Harsh Realm	1999–2000	1	9	Fox	Harris Publications		
Sheena	2000–02	2	35	Syndication	Fiction House	Series based on the comic character Sheena, Queen of the Jungle.	
Witchblade	2001–02	2	23	TNT	Image Comics / Top Cow Productions	Series based on the comic Witchblade.	
The Tick	2001–02	1	9	Fox	New England Comics	Series based on the comic character The Tick.	
Mutant X	2001–2004	3	66	Syndication	Marvel Comics	Series loosely inspired by the comic Mutant X.	
Smallville	2001–2011	10	217	The WB (seasons 1–5); The CW (seasons 6–10)	DC Comics	Adjacent to the Arrowverse.	
Jeremiah	2002–04	2	35	Showtime	Le Lombard / Dupuis	Series based on the comic character Jeremiah.	
Birds of Prey	2002–03	1	13	The WB	DC Comics		
Blade: The Series	2006	1	12	Spike	Marvel Comics		
Painkiller Jane	2007	1	22	Syfy	Event Comics / Marvel Comics / Dynamite Entertainment	Series based on the comic character Painkiller Jane	
Flash Gordon	2007–08	1	21	Syfyh	King Features Syndicate	Series based on the comic character Flash Gordon.	
The Middleman	2008	1	12	ABC Family	Viper Comics	Series based on the comic The Middleman.	
The Phantom	2009	1	2	Syfy	King Features Syndicate	Series featuring the comic charaxter Phantom.	
The Walking Dead	2010–22	11	177	AMC	Image Comics / Skybound Entertainment	Series based on the comic The Walking Dead.	
Human Target	2010–2011	2	25	Fox / CTV	DC Comics		
Arrow	2012–2020	8	170	The CW	DC Comics	Part of the Arrowverse.	
Agents of S.H.I.E.L.D.	2013–2020	7	136	ABC	Marvel Comics	Adjacent to the Marvel Cinematic Universe.	
Gotham	2014–2019	5	100	Fox	DC Comics		
The Flash	2014–2023	9	184	The CW	DC Comics	Part of the Arrowverse.	
Constantine	2014–15	1	13	NBC	DC Comics	Part of the Arrowverse.	
Agent Carter	2015–16	2	18	ABC	Marvel Comics	Adjacent to the Marvel Cinematic Universe.	
Powers	2015–16	2	20	PlayStation Network	Image Comics / Icon Comics / Marvel Comics		
IZombie	2015–2019	5	71	The CW	DC Comics / Vertigo Comics		
Daredevil	2015–2018	3	39	Netflix	Marvel Comics	Part of the Marvel Cinematic Universe Defenders Saga.	
Supergirl	2015–2021	6	126	CBS (season 1); The CW (seasons 2–6)	DC Comics	Part of the Arrowverse.	
Jessica Jones	2015–2019	3	39	Netflix	Marvel Comics	Part of the Marvel Cinematic Universe Defenders Saga.	
Dark Matter	2015–17	3	39	Syfy	Dark Horse Comics		
Fear the Walking Dead	2015–23	8	113	AMC	Image Comics / Skybound Entertainment	Part of The Walking Dead franchise.	
WHIH Newsfront	2015–16	1	10	YouTube	Marvel Comics		
The Tick	2016–19	2	22	Amazon Prime Video	New England Comics.	Series based on the comic character The Tick.	
Legends of Tomorrow	2016–2022	7	110	The CW	DC Comics	Part of the Arrowverse.	
Lucifer	2016–2021	6	93	Fox (seasons 1–3); Netflix (seasons 4–6)	DC Comics / Vertigo Comics	Part of the Arrowverse.	
Preacher	2016–2019	4	43	AMC	DC Comics / Vertigo Comics		
Luke Cage	2016–2018	2	26	Netflix	Marvel Comics	Part of the Marvel Cinematic Universe Defenders Saga.	
Wynonna Earp	2016–2021	4	49	Syfy	Image Comics / IDW Publishing	Series based on the comic Wynonna Earp	
Agents of S.H.I.E.L.D.: Slingshot	2016	1	6	ABC.com	Marvel Comics		
Outcast	2016–18	2	20	Cinemax	Image Comics / Skybound Entertainment	Series based on the comic Outcast,	
Van Helsing	2016–21	5	65	Syfy	Zenescope Entertainment		
Powerless	2017	1	12	NBC	DC Comics		
Legion	2017–2019	3	27	FX	Marvel Comics	Adjacent to the X-Men film series.	
Iron Fist	2017–18	2	23	Netflix	Marvel Comics	Part of the Marvel Cinematic Universe Defenders Saga.	
The Defenders	2017	1	8	Netflix	Marvel Comics	Miniseries. Part of the Marvel Cinematic Universe Defenders Saga.	
Inhumans	2017	1	8	ABC	Marvel Comics		
The Gifted	2017–2019	2	29	Fox	Marvel Comics	Adjacent to the X-Men film series.	
The Punisher	2017–2019	2	26	Netflix	Marvel Comics	Part of the Marvel Cinematic Universe Defenders Saga.	
Runaways	2017–2019	3	33	Hulu	Marvel Comics		
Happy!	2017–2019	2	18	Syfy	Image Comics / Shadowline		
Riverdale	2017–23	7	137	The CW	Archie Comics	Series based on characters from Archie Comics.	
Black Lightning	2018–2021	4	58	The CW	DC Comics	Part of the Arrowverse.	
Ninjak vs. the Valiant Universe	2018	1	6	YouTube	Valiant Comics	Series featuring various Valiant characters.	
Chilling Adventures of Sabrina	2018–20	2	36	Netflix	Archie Comics	Series based on the comic Chilling Adventures of Sabrina.	
Krypton	2018–19	2	20	Syfy	DC Comics		
Cloak & Dagger	2018–19	2	20	Freeform	Marvel Comics		
Titans	2018–2023	4	49	DC Universe (seasons 1–2); Max (seasons 3–4)	DC Comics	Adjacent to the Arrowverse.	
Doom Patrol	2019–2023	4	46	DC Universe (seasons 1–2); Max (seasons 2–4)	DC Comics	Adjacent to the Arrowverse.	
Swamp Thing	2019	1	10	DC Universe	DC Comics	Adjacent to the Arrowverse.	
The Daily Bugle	2019–22	3	29	YouTube	Marvel Comics		
Stumptown	2019–20	1	18	ABC	Oni Press	Series based on the comic Stumptown.	
The Boys	2019–2026	5	34	Prime Video	WildStorm / Dynamite Entertainment		
The Umbrella Academy	2019–2024	4	36	Netflix	Dark Horse Comics		
Raising Dion	2019–22	2	17	Netflix	Traffik Filmworks		
V Wars	2019	1	10	Netflix	IDW Publishing		
Deadly Class	2019	1	10	Syfy	Image Comics	Series based on the comic Deadly Class.	
Daybreak	2019	1	10	Netflix	Drawn & Quarterly		
Pennyworth	2019–2022	3	30	Epix (seasons 1–2)Max (season 3)	DC Comics		
Batwoman	2019–2022	3	51	The CW	DC Comics	Part of the Arrowverse.	
Watchmen	2019	1	9	HBO	DC Comics	Miniseries.	
Stargirl	2020–2022	3	39	DC Universe (season 1); The CW (seasons 1–3)	DC Comics	Part of the Arrowverse.	
I Am Not Okay with This	2020	1	7	Netflix	Fantagraphics		
Vagrant Queen	2020	1	10	Syfy	Vault Comics		
Warrior Nun	2020–22	2	18	Netflix	Antarctic Press	Series based on comic book character Warrior Nun Areala.	
October Faction	2020	1	10	Netflix	IDW Publishing		
Locke & Key	2020–22	3	28	Netflix	IDW Publishing	Series based on the comic Locke & Key.	
Snowpiercer	2020–24	4	40	TNT / AMC	À Suivre	Series based on the graphic novel Snowpiercer	
Cursed	2020	1	10	Netflix	Simon & Schuster	Series based on the graphic novel by Frank Miller and Tom Wheeler.	
The Walking Dead: World Beyond	2020–21	2	20	AMC	Image Comics / Skybound Entertainment	Part of The Walking Dead franchise.	
Helstrom	2020	1	10	Hulu	Marvel Comics		
WandaVision	2021	1	9	Disney+	Marvel Comics	Miniseries. Part of the Marvel Cinematic Universe.	
Superman & Lois	2021–2024	4	53	The CW	DC Comics	Renewed for a fourth and final season. Adjacent to the Arrowverse.	
The Falcon and the Winter Soldier	2021	1	6	Disney+	Marvel Comics	Miniseries. Part of the Marvel Cinematic Universe.	
Jupiter's Legacy	2021	1	8	Netflix	Image Comics / Millarworld		
Sweet Tooth	2021–2024	3	24	Netflix	DC Comics / Vertigo Comics	Renewed for a third and final season.	
Loki	2021–23	2	12	Disney+	Marvel Comics	Part of the Marvel Cinematic Universe.	
Resident Alien	2021–24	4	44	Syfy	Dark Horse Comics	Series based on the comic Resident Alien.	
Seven on 7	2021–present	1	9	YouTube / Instagram / Twitter	Dynamite Entertainment / WildStorm	Part of The Boys franchise.	
Y: The Last Man	2021	1	10	FX on Hulu	DC Comics / Vertigo Comics		
Hawkeye	2021	1	6	Disney+	Marvel Comics	Miniseries Part of the Marvel Cinematic Universe.	
Paper Girls	2022	1	8	Amazon Prime Video	Image Comics	Series based on the comic Paper Girls.	
Surfside Girls	2022	1	10	Apple TV+	IDW Publishing		
Wednesday	2022–present	2	16	Netflix	Conde Nast	Series featuring the comic character Wednesday Addams.	
Peacemaker	2022-2025	2	16	HBO Max	DC Comics	Part of the DC Extended Universe / DC Universe.	
Naomi	2022	1	13	The CW	DC Comics		
DMZ	2022	1	4	Max	DC Comics / Vertigo Comics	Miniseries.	
Moon Knight	2022	1	6	Disney+	Marvel Comics	Miniseries. Part of the Marvel Cinematic Universe.	
Ms. Marvel	2022	1	6	Disney+	Marvel Comics	Miniseries. Part of the Marvel Cinematic Universe.	
The Sandman	2022	2	23	Netflix	DC Comics / Vertigo Comics	Renewed for a second season.	
She-Hulk: Attorney at Law	2022	1	9	Disney+	Marvel Comics	Miniseries. Part of the Marvel Cinematic Universe.	
Tales of the Walking Dead	2022	1	6	AMC / AMC+	Image Comics / Skybound Entertainment	Part of The Walking Dead franchise.	
Gotham Knights	2023	1	13	The CW	DC Comics		
Secret Invasion	2023	1	6	Disney+	Marvel Comics	Miniseries. Part of the Marvel Cinematic Universe.	
American Born Chinese	2023	1	8	Disney+	First Second Books	Series based on the graphic novel American Born Chinese.	
Gen V	2023–present	2	13	Prime Video	WildStorm / Dynamite Entertainment	Renewed for a second season. Set in continuity with The Boys.	
One Piece	2023–present	2	16	Netflix	Shueisha	Series based on the manga One Piece.	
Bodies	2023	1	8	Netflix	DC Comics / Vertigo Comics		
The Chosen One	2023	1	6	Netflix	Image Comics		
The Walking Dead: Dead City	2023–present	2	12	AMC	Image Comics / Skybound Entertainment	Part of The Walking Dead franchise.	
The Walking Dead: Daryl Dixon	2023–present	3	19	AMC	Image Comics / Skybound Entertainment	Part of The Walking Dead franchise.	
Echo	2024	1	5	Disney+	Marvel Comics	Miniseries. Part of the Marvel Cinematic Universe.	
The Walking Dead: The Ones Who Live	2024	1	6	AMC	Image Comics / Skybound Entertainment	Part of The Walking Dead franchise.	
The Penguin	2024	1	8	Max	DC Comics	Set in continuity with The Batman.	
Agatha All Along	2024	1	9	Disney+	Marvel Comics	Part of the Marvel Cinematic Universe.	
Dead Boy Detectives	2024	1	8	Netflix	DC Comics / Vertigo Comics	Set in continuity with The Sandman.	
Daredevil: Born Again	2025–2027	2	17	Diseny+	Marvel Comics	Follow-up to Daredevil. Part of the Marvel Cinematic Universe. Renewed for a third and final season.	
Ironheart	2025	1	6	Diseny+	Marvel Comics	Part of the Marvel Cinematic Universe.	
Butterfly	2025	1	6	Amazon Prime Video	Boom! Studios	Series based on the graphic novel of the same name.	
Wonder Man	2026	1	8	Disney+	Marvel Comics	Part of the Marvel Cinematic Universe	
Spider-Noir	2026	1	8	MGM+ / Prime Video	Marvel Comics	Series based on the Marvel character Spider-Man Noir.	
Lanterns	2026	1	8	HBO Max	DC Comics	Series based on Green Lantern. Part of the DC Universe.	
VisionQuest	2026	1	8	Disney+	Marvel Comics	Part of the Marvel Cinematic Universe.	
Upcoming
Untitled Arkham series	TBA	TBA	Max	DC Comics	Part of the DC Universe.		
Waller	TBA	TBA	Max	DC Comics	Spin-off of Peacemaker. Part of DC Universe.		
Paradise Lost	TBA	TBA	Max	DC Comics	Part of DC Universe.		
Booster Gold	TBA	TBA	Max	DC Comics	Part of DC Universe.		
El Gato	1	8	Amazon Prime Video	Azteca Productions	Series based on the comic El Gato Negro		
Vought Rising	TBA	TBA	Amazon Prime Video	Dynamite Entertainment / Wildstorm Comics	Prequel The Boys.		

== Animated series ==
Title	Original airing	Seasons	Episodes	Network(s)	Publisher	Notes	Ref.
Popeye the Sailor	1960–63	1	220	Syndication	King Features Syndicate	Series featuring the comic character Popeye.	
The Dick Tracy Show	1961–62	1	130	Syndication	Chicago Tribune New York News Syndicate	Series featuring the comic character Dick Tracy.	
The Marvel Super Heroes	1966	1	65	ABC	Marvel Comics		
The New Adventures of Superman	1966–1970	4	68	CBS	DC Comics		
The Adventures of Superboy	1966–1969	3	34	CBS	DC Comics		
The Superman/Aquaman Hour of Adventure	1967–68	1	36	CBS	DC Comics		
The Fantastic Four	1967–68	1	20	ABC	Marvel Comics		
Spider-Man	1967–1970	3	52	ABC	Marvel Comics		
Aquaman	1968–1970	1	36	CBS	DC Comics		
The Batman/Superman Hour	1968–69	1	34	CBS	DC Comics		
The Adventures of Batman	1968–69	1	17	CBS	DC Comics		
Sabrina the Teenage Witch	1970–74	1	31	CBS	Archie Comics	Series based on the comic Sabrina the Teenage Witch.	
Super Friends	1973	1	16	ABC	DC Comics		
The New Adventures of Batman	1977–78	1	16	CBS	DC Comics		
The All-New Super Friends Hour	1977–78	1	15	ABC	DC Comics		
The Batman/Tarzan Adventure Hour	1977–78	1	7	CBS	DC Comics		
Challenge of the Superfriends	1978	2	16	ABC	DC Comics		
The All New Popeye Hour	1978–83	4	56	CBS	King Features Syndicate	Series featuring the comic character Popeye.	
The New Fantastic Four	1978	1	13	NBC	Marvel Comics		
The New Adventures of Flash Gordon	1979–1982	2	32	NBC	King Features Syndicate	Series featuring the comic character Flash Gordon.	
Casper and the Angels	1979	1	13	NBC	Harvey Comics	Series featuring the comic character Casper the Friendly Ghost.	
Fred and Barney Meet the Thing	1979	1	12	NBC	Marvel Comics		
Spider-Woman	1979–80	1	16	ABC	Marvel Comics		
The World's Greatest Super Friends	1979–80	1	8	ABC	DC Comics		
The Plastic Man Comedy/Adventure Show	1979–1981	5	112	ABC	DC Comics		
Super Friends	1980–1983	3	22	ABC	DC Comics		
Batman and the Super 7	1980–81	1	33	CBS	DC Comics		
The New Adventures of Zorro	1981	1	13	CBS	Argosy / Disney comics	Series featuring the character Zorro.	
Sport Billy	1981	1	26	NBC	Ladybird Books		
The Kid Super Power Hour with Shazam!	1981–82	2	38	NBC	DC Comics		
Spider-Man	1981–82	1	26	Syndication	Marvel Comics		
Spider-Man and His Amazing Friends	1981–1983	3	24	NBC	Marvel Comics		
The Incredible Hulk	1982–83	1	13	NBC	Marvel Comics		
Super Friends: The Legendary Super Powers Show	1984–85	1	8	ABC	DC Comics		
The Super Powers Team: Galactic Guardians	1985	1	8	ABC	DC Comics		
Defenders of the Earth	1986–87	1	65	Syndication	King Features Syndicate		
Teenage Mutant Ninja Turtles	1987–96	10	193	Syndication	Mirage Studios / IDW Publishing		
DuckTales	1987–90	4	100	Syndication	Disney Comics	Series based on the comic Uncle Scrooge. Features the superhero Gizmoduck.	
Popeye and Son	1987	1	13	CBS	King Features Syndicate	Series featuring the comic character Popeye.	
Marvel Action Universe	1988–1991	3	—N/a	Syndication	Marvel Comics		
Superman	1988	1	13	CBS	DC Comics		
Swamp Thing	1990–91	1	5	Fox Kids	DC Comics		
Bucky O'Hare and the Toad Wars!	1991	1	13	Syndication	Continuity Comics	Series based on the comic character Bucky O'Hare.	
The Legend of Prince Valiant	1991–93	2	65	The Family Channel	King Features Syndicate	Series featuring the comic character Prince Valiant.	
Darkwing Duck	1991–92	3	91	Syndication	Disney Comics	Series featuring characters from DuckTales.	
Batman: The Animated Series	1992–1995	2	85	Fox Kids	DC Comics	Part of the DC Animated Universe.	
X-Men: The Animated Series	1992–1997	5	76	Fox Kids	Marvel Comics	Part of the Marvel Animated Universe.	
Fish Police	1992	1	6	CBS	Comico / Apple Press / Marvel Comics	Series based on the comic Fish Police.	
Conan the Adventurer	1992–1993	2	65	Syndication / M6	Marvel Comics / Weird Tales	Series featuring the character Conan the Barbarian	
The New Adventures of Speed Racer	1993	1	13	Syndication	Shueisha	Series featuring the comic character Speed Racer.	
Cadillacs and Dinosaurs	1993	1	13	CBS	Kitchen Sink Press	Series based on the comic Xenozoic Tales.	
Fantastic Four	1994–1996	2	26	Syndication	Marvel comics	Part of the Marvel Animated Universe.	
Iron Man	1994–1996	2	6	Syndication	Marvel comics	Part of the Marvel Animated Universe.	
The Tick	1994–1996	3	36	Fox Kids	New England Comics	Series based on the comic character Tick.	
Wild C.A.T.s	1994–95	1	13	CBS	DC Comics / WildStorm / Image Comics		
Ultraforce	1994–95	1	13	USA Network	Malibu Comics / Marvel Comics		
Conan and the Young Warriors	1994	1	13	CBS	Series featuring the character Conan the Barbarian.		
Spider-Man	1994–1998	5	65	Fox Kids	Marvel Comics	Part of the Marvel Animated Universe.	
Phantom 2040	1994–1996	1	35	Syndication	King Features Syndicate	Series featuring the comic character The Phantom.	
Duckman	1994–97	4	70	USA Network	Dark Horse Comics / Topps	Series based on the comic character created by Everett Peck.	
The Marvel Action Hour	1994–1995	2	—N/a	Syndication	Marvel Comics		
The Mask: The Animated Series	1995–97	3	54	CBS	Dark Horse Comics		
The Savage Dragon	1995–96	2	26	USA Network	Image Comics / Highbrow Entertainment	Series based on the comic Savage Dragon	
The Maxx	1995	1	13	MTV	Image Comics / IDW Publishing / WildStorm		
The Superman/Batman Adventures	1995	1	2	USA Network	DC Comics		
Superman: The Animated Series	1996–2000	4	54	Kids' WB	DC Comics	Part of the DC Animated Universe.	
The Incredible Hulk	1996–97	2	21	UPN Kids	Marvel Comics	Part of the Marvel Animated Universe.	
Flash Gordon	1996–97	1	26	Syndication	King Features Syndicate	Series featuring comic character Flash Gordon	
The New Adventures of Zorro	1997–1998	2	26	Syndication	Argosy / Disney comics	Series featuring the character Zorro.	
Todd McFarlane's Spawn	1997–1999	3	18	HBO	Image Comics / TMP		
The New Batman Adventures	1997–1999	1	24	Kids' WB	DC Comics	Part of the DC Animated Universe.	
The New Batman/Superman Adventures	1997–2000	1	3	Kids' WB	DC Comics	Part of the DC Animated Universe.	
Men in Black: The Series	1997–2001	4	53	Kids' WB	Malibu Comics / Marvel Comics		
The Adventures of Sam & Max: Freelance Police	1997–98	1	13	Fox Kids	Steve Purcell	Series based on the comic Sam & Max	
Silver Surfer	1998	1	13	Fox Kids	Marvel Comics	Part of the Marvel Animated Universe.	
Sabrina: The Animated Series	1999	1	65	UPN	Archie Comics	Series featuring the comic Sabrina the Teenage Witch	
Archie's Weird Mysteries	1999–2000	1	40	PAX	Archie Comics	Series featuring characters from Archie Comics.	
Batman Beyond	1999–2001	3	52	Kids' WB	DC Comics	Part of the DC Animated Universe.	
Big Guy and Rusty the Boy Robot	1999–2001	2	26	Fox Kids	Dark Horse Comics		
Spider-Man Unlimited	1999–2001	1	13	Fox Kids	Marvel Comics	Part of the Marvel Animated Universe.	
The Avengers: United They Stand	1999–2000	1	13	Fox Kids	Marvel Comics	Part of the Marvel Animated Universe.	
X-Men: Evolution	2000–2003	4	52	Kids' WB	Marvel Comics		
Fat Dog Mendoza	2000–01	2	26	Cartoon Network UK	Dark Horse Comics		
Static Shock	2000–2004	4	52	Kids' WB	WildStorm / DC Comics / Milestone Media	Part of the DC Animated Universe.	
Gotham Girls	2000–02	3	30	warnerbros.com	DC Comics	Part of the DC Animated Universe.	
The Zeta Project	2001–02	2	26	Kids' WB	DC Comics	Part of the DC Animated Universe.	
Justice League	2001–2004	2	52	Cartoon Network	DC Comics	Part of the DC Animated Universe.	
Dan Dare: Pilot of the Future	2002	1	26	Channel 5	Hulton Press	Series featuring the comic character Dan Dare.	
Sabrina's Secret Life	2003–04	1	26	Syndication	Archie Comics	Sequel series to Sabrina: The Animated Series.	
Teenage Mutant Ninja Turtles	2003–09	7	155	Fox	Mirage Studios / IDW Publishing		
Stripperella	2003–04	1	13	Spike TV	POW! Entertainment	Series created by Pamela Anderson and Stan Lee.	
Spider-Man: The New Animated Series	2003	1	13	MTV	Marvel Comics		
Teen Titans	2003–2006	5	65	Cartoon Network / Kids' WB (seasons 1–2)	DC Comics		
Justice League Unlimited	2004–2006	3	39	Cartoon Network	DC Comics	Part of the DC Animated Universe.	
W.I.T.C.H.	2004–2006	2	52	ABC	Disney Italy		
The Batman	2004–2008	5	65	Cartoon Network (seasons 1–3); Kids' WB (seasons 4–5)	DC Comics		
Krypto the Superdog	2005–06	2	39	Cartoon Network	DC Comics		
Fantastic Four: World's Greatest Heroes	2006	1	26	Cartoon Network	Marvel Comics		
Legion of Super Heroes	2006–2008	2	25	Kids' WB	DC Comics		
Zorro: Generation Z	2006	1	26	Pop	Argosy / Disney comics	Serie featuring the character Zorro.	
The Spectacular Spider-Man	2008–09	2	26	The CW (season 1); Disney XD (season 2)	Marvel Comics		
Speed Racer: The Next Generation	2008–13	2	52	Nicktoons	Shueisha	Part of the Speed Racer franchise.	
World of Quest	2008	2	26	Kids' WB / Teletoon	Yen Press	Series based on the graphic novel The World of Quest.	
Watchmen: Motion Comic	2008–09	1	12	Syndication	Dc Comics		
Batman: The Brave and the Bold	2008–2011	3	65	Cartoon Network	Dc Comics		
Wolverine and the X-Men	2009	1	26	Nicktoons	Marvel Comics		
Iron Man: Armored Adventures	2009–2012	2	52	Nicktoons	Marvel Comics		
The Super Hero Squad Show	2009–2011	2	52	Cartoon Network	Marvel Comics		
The Avengers: Earth's Mightiest Heroes	2010–2012	2	25	Disney XD	Marvel Comics	Set in continuity with Wolverine and the X-Men.	
Generator Rex	2010–13	3	60	Cartoon Network	Image Comics / Avalon Studios	Series based on the comic M. Rex	
Black Panther	2010	1	6	ABC3	Marvel Comics		
Young Justice	2010–2022	4	98	Cartoon Network (seasons 1–2); DC Universe (season 3)Max (season 4)	DC Comics		
Green Lantern: The Animated Series	2011–2013	1	26	Cartoon Network	DC Comics		
DC Nation Shorts	2011–14	1	162	Cartoon Network	DC Comics		
Ultimate Spider-Man	2012–2017	4	104	Disney XD	Marvel Comics	Part of the Marvel Animation Universe.	
Teenage Mutant Ninja Turtles	2012–17	5	124	Nickelodeon	Mirage Studios / IDW Publishing		
SuperFuckers	2012–13	1	12	YouTube	Top Shelf Productions / Frederator Studios / IDW Publishing	Series based on the comic of the same name.	
Teen Titans Go!	2013–present	8	392	Cartoon Network	DC Comics		
Axe Cop	2013–2015	2	22	Fox	Dark Horse Comics		
Sabrina: Secrets of a Teenage Witch	2013–2014	1	26	Hub Network	Archie Comics	Series featuring the comic character Sabrina Spellman.	
Avengers Assemble	2013–2019	5	127	Disney XD	Marvel Comics	Part of the Marvel Animation Universe.	
Beware the Batman	2013–14	1	26	Cartoon Network / Adult Swim	DC Comics		
Hulk and the Agents of S.M.A.S.H.	2013–2015	2	52	Disney XD	Marvel Comics	Part of the Marvel Animation Universe.	
Guardians of the Galaxy	2015–2019	3	79	Disney XD	Marvel Comics		
Justice League: Gods and Monsters Chronicles	2015	1	3	Machinima	DC Comics		
Vixen	2015–16	2	12	CW Seed	DC Comics	Part of the Arrowverse.	
Justice League Action	2016–2018	1	52	Cartoon Network	DC Comics		
DC Super Hero Girls	2015–18	5	112	Cartoon Network / Boomerang	DC Comics		
Spider-Man	2017–2020	3	58	Disney XD	Marvel Comics	Set in continuity with Guardians of the Galaxy.	
Marvel Super Hero Adventures	2017–2020	4	40	Disney Channel	Marvel Comics		
Big Hero 6: The Series	2017–2021	2	56	Disney XD / Disney Channel	Marvel Comics	Continuation of the 2014 film loosely based on Marvel Comics.	
Rocket & Groot	2017	1	12	Disney XD	Marvel Comics		
Ant-Man	2017	1	6	Disney XD	Marvel Comics		
Freedom Fighters: The Ray	2017–18	2	12	CW Seed	DC Comics	Part of the Arrowverse.	
Constantine: City of Demons	2018–19	1	2	CW Seed	DC Comics	Series tied with the live-action series Constantine.	
DuckTales	2017–2019	3	69	Disney XD	Disney Comics	Reboot of DuckTales. Features the superheroes GizmoDuck and Darkwing Duck.	
The Epic Tales of Captain Underpants	2018–2020	4	45	Netflix	Scholastic	Series based on the graphic novel series Captain Underpants.	
Super Dinosaur	2018–19	1	26	Teletoon	Image Comics / Skybound Entertainment	Series based on the comic Super Dinosaur	
Hilda	2018–2023	3	34	Netflix	Nobrow Press	Series based on the graphic novel Hilda by Luke Pearson.	
DC Super Hero Girls	2019–2021	2	78	Cartoon Network	DC Comics		
Harley Quinn	2019–present	5	54	DC Universe (seasons 1–2)Max (season 3–)	DC Comics	Renewed for a fifth season.	
The Rocketeer	2019–20	1	22	Disney Junior	Pacific Comics / Dark Horse Comics / IDW Publishing	Series based on the comic character The Rocketeer.	
Rise of the Teenage Mutant Ninja Turtles	2019–20	2	39	Nickelodeon	Mirage Studios / IDW Publishing		
The Last Kids on Earth	2019–21	3	21	Netflix	Viking Books for Young Readers / Egmont Books Ltd	Series based on the graphic novel series The Last Kids on Earth.	
Deathstroke: Knights & Dragons	2020	1	12	CW Seed	DC Comics		
Kipo and the Age of Wonderbeasts	2020	3	30	Netflix	Radford Sechrist		
Cleopatra in Space	2020–21	3	26	Peacock / Hulu	Graphix	Series based on the graphic novel Cleopatra in Space.	
Kid Cosmic	2021–22	3	24	Netflix	Craig McCracken	Series based on the comic The Kid from Planet Earth.	
Invincible	2021–present	4	30	Prime Video	Image Comics / Skybound Entertainment	Renewed for a third season.	
Trese	2021	1	6	Netflix	Alamat Comics / Visprint / Avenida Books / Ablaze Publishing	Series based on the comic Trese.	
Super Crooks	2021	1	13	Netflix	Icon Comics / Marvel Comics / Millarworld	Series based on the comic Supercrooks.	
Superhero Kindergarten	2021	1	26	Kartoon Channel	Archie Comics / Genius Brands	Series created by Stan Lee/	
Aquaman: King of Atlantis	2021	1	3	Max	DC Comics	Series loosely set after the events of the DC Extended Universe.	
M.O.D.O.K.	2021	1	10	Hulu	Marvel Comics		
Spidey and His Amazing Friends	2021–present	3	59	Disney Junior	Marvel Comics	Renewed for a fourth season.	
What If...?	2021–present	3	26	Disney+	Marvel Comics	Renewed for a third season. Part of the Marvel Cinematic Universe Multiverse Saga.	
Hit-Monkey	2021–present	2	20	Hulu	Marvel Comics	Renewed for a second season.	
The Boys Presents: Diabolical	2022	1	8	Prime Video	WildStorm / Dynamite Entertainment	Animated spin-off of The Boys.	
Dead End: Paranormal Park	2022	2	20	Netflix	Hamish Steele	Series based on the graphic novel DeadEndia.	
Baymax!	2022	1	6	Disney+	Marvel Comics	Spin-off of Big Hero 6: The Series.	
Samurai Rabbit: The Usagi Chronicles	2022	2	20	Netflix	Dark Horse Comics / IDW Publishing	Series based on the comic Usagi Yojimbo	
I Am Groot	2022–present	2	10	Part of the Marvel Cinematic Universe.	Disney+	Marvel Comics	
Batwheels	2022–present	2	77	Cartoon Network / Max	DC Comics	Renewed for a second season.	
Mech Cadets	2023	1	10	Netflix	Boom! Studios	Series based on the comic Mech Cadet Yu.	
Scott Pilgrim Takes Off	2023	1	8	Netflix	Oni Press	Series based on the graphic novel Scott Pilgrim.	
Moon Girl and Devil Dinosaur	2023–25	2	41	Disney Channel	Marvel Comics	Renewed for a second season	
My Adventures with Superman	2023–25	2	17	Adult Swim / Max	DC Comics	Will be 20 eps. total once Season 2 ends on July 21, 2024. Renewed for a third season.	
Tales of the Teenage Mutant Ninja Turtles	2024–25	2	24	Paramount+	Mirage Studios / IDW Publishing	Continuation of the film Teenage Mutant Ninja Turtles: Mutant Mayhem.	
X-Men '97	2024	2	19	Disney+	Marvel Comics	Continuation of X-Men (1992–97). Renewed for a second season and third season.	
Kite Man: Hell Yeah!	2024–present	1	10	Max	DC Comics	Set in continuity with Harley Quinn.	
Batman: Caped Crusader	2024–present	2	20	Amazon Prime Video	DC Comics	Renewed for a second season.	
Creature Commandos	2024–present	1	7	Max	DC Comics	Part of the DC Universe.	
Your Friendly Neighborhood Spider-Man	2025–present	1	2	Disney+	Marvel Comics	Renewed for a second season.	
Beast Boy: Lone Wolf	2024	1	10	Cartoon Network / Max	DC Comics		
Max & the Midknights	2024–present	2	11	Nickelodeon	Crown Books	Series based on the graphic novel by Lincoln Peirce.	
Iyanu	2025–present	2	14	HBO Max	Dark Horse Comics	Series based on the graphic novel Iyanu: Child of Wonder by Roye Okupe and Godwin Akpan.	
Super Duper Bunny League	2025–present	2	26	Nickelodeon	Jamie Smart	Series based on the comic book Superhero Bunny League.	
Iron Man and His Awesome Friends	2025–present	1	30	Marvel Comics	Disney Jr. / Disney+	Series based on the Iron Man comics.	
Eyes of Wakanda	2025–present	1	4	Marvel Comics	Disney+		
Marvel Zombies	2025–present	1	4	Marvel Comics	Disney+	Spinoff of What IF...?	
Bat-Fam	2025–present	1	10	DC Comics	Amazon Prime Video	Series following the events of the film Merry Little Batman.	
Get Jiro	1	10	DC Comics/Vertigo Comics	Adult Swim/HBO Max	Series based on the comic Get Jiro!.		

== See also ==
- List of superhero television series
- List of television programs based on comics
