= Sport Ranger =

Thai TV series

- Title screen
- Created by: Broadcast Thai Television
- Starring: Ronnarid Gnampattanapongchai; Boonyarit Doojphibulpol; Todsapon Maaisuk; Woranan Jantararatchamee; Nidchashiita Jaruwat; Jerry Fransis Angus
- Country of origin: Thailand
- No. of seasons: 2
- No. of episodes: 32

Production
- Running time: 21-24 minutes (each episode, excluding commercials)

Original release
- Network: Thai Channel 3
- Release: August 6, 2006 – August 24, 2012

Squadron Sport Ranger (Thai: ขบวนการ สปอร์ตเรนเจอร์ Khop-won-kaan So-pot-reen-choe) is a Thai live-action superhero television series that draws inspiration from Japanese Super Sentai and American Power Rangers franchises. The series premiered on August 6, 2006, on Thai Channel 3. It features a sports theme, with each of the Sport Rangers specializing in a different sport.

The show’s second season, titled Sport Ranger 2 (Thai: ขบวนการ สปอร์ตเรนเจอร์ 2), premiered on February 2, 2012, on Channel 3.

== Plot ==
The series follows the conflict between the Earth and an alien tribe called Starhunter, who harvest life energy from other planets using a device called the "King Medal." The Starhunter tribe initially plans to conquer Earth, believing it would be an easy target. However, their plans are thwarted when their ship, carrying both the King Medal and a newly created "Knight Medal," is destroyed in a battle on Earth. The medals are lost in the explosion, which occurs in Siberia.

One of the medals is shattered into five pieces. These pieces are discovered by researchers led by Dr. Earth, while the complete medal is acquired by Dr. Heart. After an explosion in Heart's lab, the medal goes missing, and monsters begin to appear, created from humans who absorbed energy from the missing medal.

Dr. Earth, working to address the threat, develops the "SportDetector" to harness the power of the five broken pieces. He provides five young individuals with special suits that utilize the unique powers of each piece. These young heroes are tasked with combating the emerging monsters and stopping the Starhunter tribe's new invasion plans.

In the finale of the first season, the three male Sport Rangers—Ace, Up, and New—sacrifice themselves to destroy the evil palace.

== Sport Searching School ==
=== Sport Rangers ===
- Ace (เอส) / Boxing Red: Powered by light. Corresponds to courage, determination. Former amateur boxer who was recruited to be the leader of the Sport Rangers. At first he had doubts, but he soon joined the others in battle.
  - Roll call: "The power of a determined fist!"
  - Weapon: Thunder Fist
- Ice (ไอซ์) / Boxing Red II: Leader in season 2.
- Up (อัพ) / Soccer Yellow: Powered by electricity. Corresponds to creativity, wisdom. Former soccer player who acts as second in command. He is serious about the Sport Rangers' duty and often takes charge of the team.
  - Roll call: "The power of wise creativity!"
  - Weapon: Power Ball
- Ball (บอล) / Soccer Yellow II
- New (นิว) / Tennis Green: Powered by heart. Corresponds to enthusiasm, cheerfulness. Former tennis player who is playful and flirtatious. He seems to have some knowledge of English.
  - Roll call: "The power of an agile mind!"
  - Weapon: Racquet Sword
- Ten (เทน) / Tennis Green II: Second in command in season 2.
- Yu (ยู) / Swimming Blue: Powered by water. Corresponds to endurance, perseverance. Former swimmer who is like a caring older sister to her teammates and friends.
  - Roll call: "The power of surging water!"
  - Weapon: Double Cut Fin
- May (เมย์) / Gymnastic Pink: Powered by wind. Corresponds to kindheartedness, mercy. A former gymnast that may seem shy and withdrawn, but she has used her girlish figure to distract enemies.
  - Roll call: "The power of gentle vigor!"
  - Weapon: Maya Ribbon

=== Assistance ===
- Doctor Earth (ดร.เอิร์ธ) / Debola : Lead scientist of SSS; mentor to the Sport Rangers. He is responsible for creating all of the Sport Rangers' equipment.
- Darling (ดาร์ลิ่ง): Support A.I. of SSS.
- Hanuman (หนุมาน): New Support A.I.

=== Other characters ===
- Po-Po: A clumsy photographer and friend of Ace.
- Uncle Cherry: An absent-minded man who runs a drink stand that the Sport Rangers often visit.
- Marine: (104) Yu's younger adopted sister. She was envious of Yu's swimming abilities, so she took a dark medal and transformed into a monster.
- Maria: (105, 106) A tennis player and friend of New. She has an allergy to sunlight that causes her vision to become blurred.
- Tone: (107) May's ex-boyfriend that had a dependence on drugs. He was captured and was forcibly put under the control of a dark medal.
- Professor Josh: (109, 110) A former member of SSS who left to coach a basketball team after a dispute. Dr. Earth sought him out to help in the development of the Spirit Robo.

== Starhunter ==
Starhunter are the main antagonists of the series.

- Queen (ราชินีนางพญา)
- Lord of the 3rd (ลอร์ดรุ่นที่ 3)
- General Tosa (เจเนอรัล โทซ่า)
- Sit-thi (มอนสเคาท์ / สิทธิ์)
- Matee-er (เมธิเออร์)
- Gib-Giew Soldiers (ทหารระดับล่าง กิ๊บกิ้ว)

=== Monsters ===
Season 1:

- Krotha Mountain monster (101-102)
- Octopus monster (103)
- Bird monster (Marine) (104)
- Spike monster (Matina) (105-106)
- Hula Hoop monster (Tone) (107)
- Laser monster (108)
- Buffalo monster (109)
- Syringe monster (107, 110)
- Hip Hop Monster (Champ) (111)
- Seeker Ranger (112)
- Zip monster (113)
- Frog monster (114)
- Butterfly monster (115)

== Arsenal ==
- Sport Detector: The team's transformation device. It is worn on the wrist and can be used as a communicator that is able to receive calls from ordinary phones. To transform, the Sport Rangers call out "Sport charge up! Change!". The Sport Detector is also able to summon their weapons when a medallion is inserted.
- Sport Early Warning System (S.E.W.): A system developed in the seventh episode to help detect monsters created by the dark medals more quickly.

=== Weapons/attacks ===
- Star Gate Judgmentation: The team's first finishing attack. Capable of being used with only four members in episode 1, but not as effective. After Boxing Red joined the team in episode 2, they used it again to finish Krotha Mountain monster.
- Super Attack Ball: The team's second finishing attack, received in episode 3. To be summoned, Soccer Yellow throws a medal into the sky and the Super Attack Ball descends from the Moon. It is then passed from member to member and Boxing Red punches it into the enemy. The Sport Rangers' first attempt to use the Super Attack Ball was unsuccessful, they were unable to smoothly pass it to each other. To improve on their teamwork, they lined up with their legs strapped to the person next to them and tried to run together. With their new team skills, they were able to complete the combination attack during their second try.

=== Mecha ===
- Spirit Robo: The team's giant mecha that is composed of the five Spirit Fighters. It was developed by Dr. Earth with the assistance of Professor Josh in episode 10. Its main weapon is the sword, which performs its finishing move which is called the Meteor Storm Slash. The Spirit Robo is similar to several recent Super Sentai combining robos & Power Ranger Megazords (starting with the Senpuujin from "Ninpuu Sentai Hurricanger" in 2002 & Storm Megazord from Power Rangers Ninja Storm in 2003) in that the Sport Rangers remain in their individual cockpits rather coming together into a single cockpit when the combination is formed.
  - Spirit Fighter Lead: Boxing Red's vehicle that forms the chest.
  - Spirit Fighter Brain: Soccer Yellow's vehicle that forms the legs.
  - Spirit Fighter Heart: Tennis Green's vehicle that forms the right arm.
  - Spirit Fighter Strong: Swimming Blue's vehicle that forms the left arm and the shield.
  - Spirit Fighter Base: Gymnastic Pink's vehicle that forms the torso, the sword, and the head.

== Cast ==
- Ronnarid Gnampattanapongchai (รณริชช์ งามพัฒนพงศ์ชัย)— Boxing Red (Season 1)
  - Worawat Lorattanachon (วรวัฒน์ ล้อรัตนชน) - Boxing Red (Season 2)
- Boonyarit Doojphibulpol (บุญญฤทธิ์ ดุจพิบูลย์ผล) — Soccer Yellow (Season 1)
  - Thonthon Sawatkon (ธนธร ศวัสกร) - Soccer Yellow (Season 2)
- Todsapon Maaisuk (ทศพล หมายสุข) — Tennis Green (Season 1)
  - Natchara Nuntaphodej (ณัชร นันทโพธิ์เดช) - Tennis Green (Season 2)
- Woranan Jantararatchamee (วรนันท์ จันทรรัศมี) — Swimming Blue
- Nidchashiita Jaruwat (นิจชิตา จารุวัฒน์) — Gymnastic Pink (Season 1)
  - Kanchana Wongcharoen (กาญจนา วงศ์เจริญ)- Gymnastic Pink (Season 2)
- Jerry Fransis Angus (เจอร์รี่ ฟรานซิส แองกุส) — Doctor Earth

== Music ==
Opening/Ending
Sport Ranger theme

Incidental
Taken from Die Hard with a Vengeance

== See also ==
- Super Sentai
- Power Rangers
