= Speed Racer (disambiguation) =

Speed Racer is a Japanese manga and anime series.

Speed Racer may also refer to:

== Film and television ==
- The New Adventures of Speed Racer, an American animated television series
- Mach GoGoGo, a Japanese anime television series aired in 1997, also known as Speed Racer X
- Speed Racer: The Next Generation, an American animated television series aired from 2008 through 2013
- Speed Racer, a 2008 American and German live action film

== Music ==
- Speed Racer (soundtrack), a soundtrack album for the 2008 film
- "Speed Racer", a song by Devo from the 1982 album Oh, No! It's Devo
- "Speed Racer", a 2017 song by Her's
- "Speed Racer", a 2018 song by Masked Wolf

== Video games ==
- Speed Racer in The Challenge of Racer X, a 1992 video game
- Speed Racer in My Most Dangerous Adventures, a 1994 video game
- Speed Racer (1995 video game)
- Speed Racer (1996 video game)
- Speed Racer: The Videogame, a 2008 video game based on the live action speed racer movie.

== See also ==
- Speed Race, a 1974 video game
