= Saurus =

Saurus may refer to:

- Sarus (Goth), sometimes spelled as "Saurus", a Gothic chieftain and a commander of Emperor Honorius of the Western Roman Empire.
- Saurus (company), a Japanese video game developer owned by SNK
- Saurus (novel), by Eden Phillpotts
- -saurus, a common suffix for reptiles in taxonomy
- Saurus, a genus of lizardfishes.

== Vehicles ==
- Nissan Saurus, a concept car by Nissan Motors
- Nissan Saurus Jr., the race car version of Nissan Saurus first sold in 1991
- Saurus Oy (Sammutin Oy before 2018), a Finnish manufacturer of specialty vehicles

== See also ==
- Thesaurus
