= Mach Five (Speed Racer) =

Fictional car from Speed Racer franchise

- Speed Racer franchise element
- Publisher: Tatsunoko Production
- First appearance: Speed Racer; 1967; 59 years ago
- Created by: Tatsuo Yoshida
- Genre: Science fiction

In-universe information
- Owners: Speed Racer
- Function: Drives at high speed

The Mach Five (マッハ号, Mahha-gō) is the fictional racing car which appears in the anime series Speed Racer (known as Mach Go! Go! Go! in Japan) and its adaptations, including TV anime series and live-action films. The car has a set of special devices the driver can deploy with buttons on the steering wheel.

== Design ==
Mach Five was designed by Mitsuki Nakamura, who was the art director of Tatsunoko Production, which produced the 1967 TV anime series.

The initial plan was to keep the original manga (Note: The original manga was Pilot A (Ace) by Tatsuo Yoshida, serialized from 1960 to 1964, which differs from the manga subsequently drawn for the anime broadcast.) design for the anime production, but it was decided to redesign the car, and Nakamura, a car enthusiast, was entrusted with the task. Nakamura scoured photographic materials and designed the car in reference to the Porsche, Ferrari and Jaguar race cars of the time. The car's special devices and other settings were conceived by Tatsunoko's literary section.

Mach Five's design remained timeless and modern half a century after its birth, and passed muster for the Wachowskis' 2008 live-action film adaptation with few changes 40 years later.

== Works featuring Mach Five ==
=== Original Japanese TV anime series ===
Speed Racer (known as Mach GoGoGo in Japan) is the first series produced in Japan in 1967 based on the manga.

Mach Five is the racing car driven by "Speed Racer" ("Go Mifune" in the Japanese version), whose car was designed, manufactured, and created by "Pops Racer" (Daisuke Mifune), Speed Racer's father. The car is a two-seater, left-hand drive car with no detailed specifications other than that it is powered by a V12 engine. The body is painted white and blue with the letter "M" written in red on the hood. (Note: This stand for the initials of "Mifune", which is the character's last name and the name of his father's motor company.)

The car has seven special functions, each of which is controlled by a button on the steering wheel assigned to each initial from A to G.

Button	Name	Function
A	Auto-Jacks	These are built-in jacks and the driver can make the car jump over obstacles by deploying them while driving.
B	Belt tires	These are deployable tracks, allowing the car to gain traction on any surface, including deserts and rough terrain.
C	Cutter Blade	These are giant rotating blades that deploys from the front of the vehicle, allowing the car to move forward while clearing obstacles such as luxuriant vegetation.
D	Defensor/Deflector	This is a hard plastic transparent covering that encloses the open cockpit and provides occupant protection bullets and other objects.
E	Evening Eye	This is an Infrared night vision system that provides clear vision at night and in fog when viewed through helmet goggles.
F	Frogger Mode	This feature allows the car to carry underwater while being supplied with oxygen from an oxygen cylinder, allowing the driver to see above the water through a periscope and video display.
G	Gizmo	This is a bird-shaped drone mounted under the hood that can be remotely controlled by the driver. It is primarily used to transmit images and voice messages to others.

=== American remake ===
The New Adventures of Speed Racer is a remake series produced in the United States in 1993, and has not been released in Japan.

Mach Five's design was full redesigned.

=== Japanese remake ===
This was a remake produced in Japan in 1997 and was the second TV series broadcast in Japan. The title in Japan is Mach GoGoGo, and overseas it is called Speed Racer Y2K, Speed Racer X, or Mach Go Go Go: Restart.

The design of Mach Five follows the front part of the previous body shape, but the rear part has been significantly modified. The car was changed from a two-seater to a three-seater with a center cockpit.

The new Mach Five functions a little differently than before.

Button	Name	Function
A	Aero jack	This feature allows the vehicle to jump with the built-in jacks, then deploy its wings and glide with jets of air.
B	Balloon tires	This feature allows the car to drive off-road by inflating the tires with air, deforming the suspension, and raising the ride height.
C	Cutter blade	These are two laser cutters.
D	Defensive shield	This is the covering that protects the cockpit.
E	Emergency wire	These are tow wires (winches).
F	Fish diver	The car can be transformed into a submersible by retracting its tires and putting out its screws from the rear, allowing it to navigate underwater.
G	Gallant	A bird-shaped drone.

=== American sequel ===
Speed Racer: The Next Generation was produced in the United States in 2008 as a sequel that takes place about 40 years after the events in the original anime. The series has not been released in Japan.

The design is almost the same as the original anime, but, the wheel rims have been changed from the original silver-white to black, and it is animated in CGI like all of the cars in the series.

=== Film ===
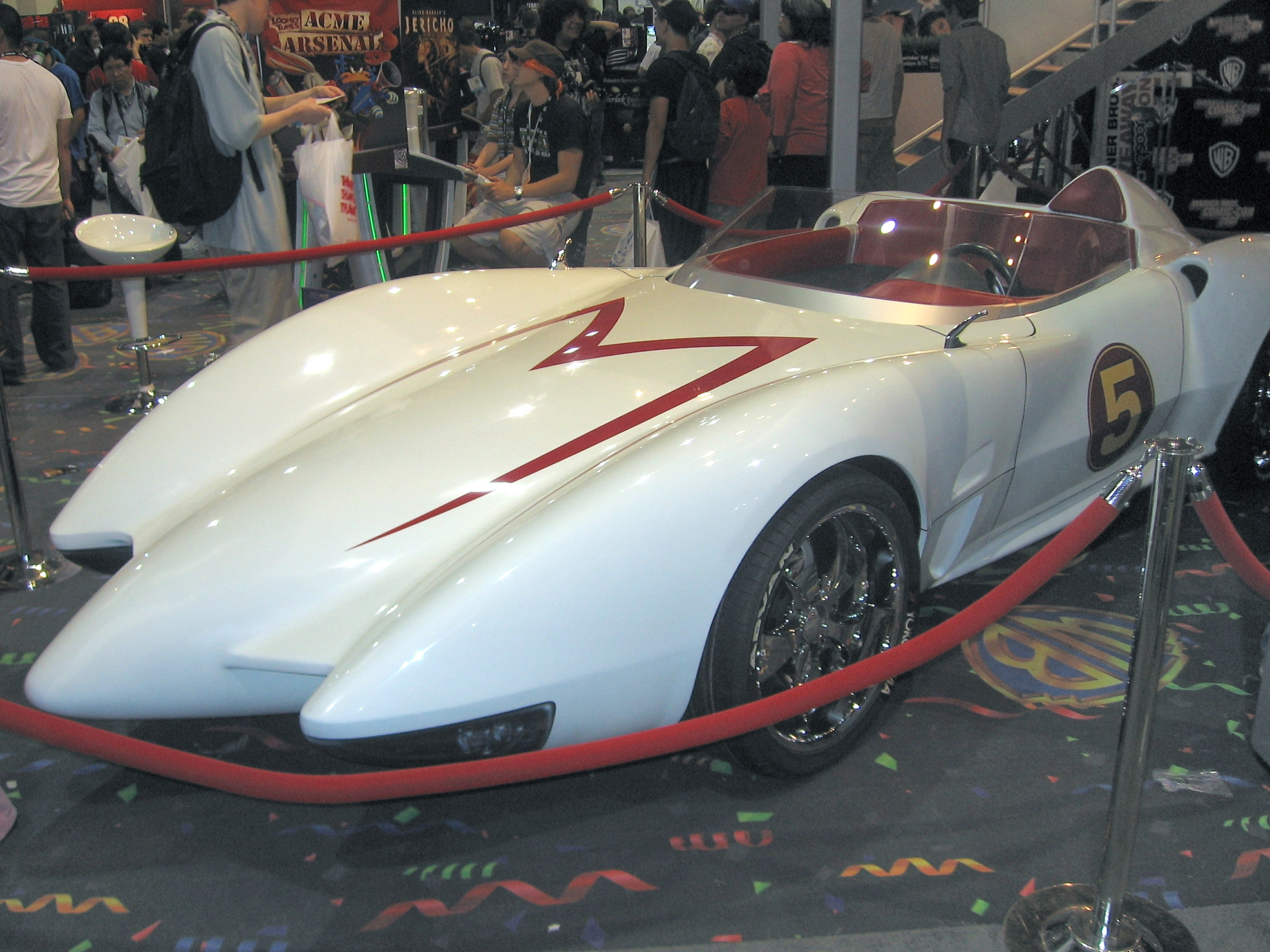
Mach 5 from the live action motion picture at the 2007 Comic-Con International

The Mach Five appears in the live-action film adaptation Speed Racer, directed by the Wachowski siblings and released by Warner Bros. Pictures.

Mach Five was almost identical in design to the original anime and was used in the film's main races with an actual vehicle. However, the car was rarely driven on real roads, instead it was hung on a crane and the effects were generated by computer graphics.

The film portrays the Mach Five as initially a street legal family vehicle, allowing for it to feature a rear compartment that Spritle and Chim-Chim later use to stow away in the vehicle. The Mach Five is later modified with gadgets and becomes Speed's alternate car for off-track races such as the Casa Cristo 5000, as well as everyday driving like a normal car. The Mach Five originally belonged to Speed's older brother Racer X. Rex, who relinquished ownership of it to Speed before he left the Racer home.

Along with the Mach Five, the movie features the "Mach 4" and the "Mach 6", two different single-seater cars created specifically for stunt races. The designs of the Mach 4 and Mach 6 are vaguely reminiscent of the Mach Five's (as in the original American comics), although the only functions the Mach 6 features are the jump jacks, which are standard equipment in race cars in the movie. Little about the Mach 4 is known, as it appears only briefly in the film and is portrayed as a red-colored companion to the 6. Speed's main car for races on the WRL track (Thunderhead, etc.) is the Mach 6. The Mach 6 was destroyed in a fixed race, but was later rebuilt for the film's final race.

== Real-life replicas ==
In 1997, a replica of the Mach Five, which was based on Nissan's entry-level race car, the Saurus, modified and covered with an FRP body, was produced to promote the Japanese anime remake. It was unveiled at the time of the TV broadcast in Japan, and later ran again at the Toyota Automobile Museum in 2010.

In 2000, a prototype of the Mach Five replica with retractable saw blade was sold at a charity auction on E-Bay in 2000. In 2002, 100 product models of Mach Five replica were planned to be manufactured as road-legal vehicles. The body, built on the 2001 Chevrolet Corvette platform, was to be extensively modified to look like the Mach Five. The Petersen Automotive Museum in Los Angeles, California has a mid-engine prototype of the Mach Five in its collection.

In 2008, after the premiere of the film Speed Racer at the Nokia Theater in Los Angeles, California, the actual racing car used in the film was unveiled.

A full-scale replica of the Mach Five was exhibited at the 2009 Tokyo Motor Show. It was produced in connection with a project by Japanese chocolate maker Tyrol Choco, in which Mach Five miniature cars were given away through a lottery.

== Mach Five in popular culture ==
- A Speed Racer-themed catamaran, named after the franchise, was built in 2005, designed to resemble the Mach 5.
- Road & Track magazine released an article about a "real" Mach 5 prototype car on 31 March 2008 (the day before April 1st), about a "genuine running model" made for the 2008 film. The article included performance data and feature descriptions for the car that was "in a league by itself".
- In the online typing game, Nitro Type, it was available as an achievement car for completing 30,000 races and is renamed the "Wach 6". It was created as a commemoration to the player CarriePirc for being the first person to reach 30,000 races on one singular account.
- The Mach Five is featured in the 2018 movie Ready Player One during a car racing scene.
