= Speed Racer in My Most Dangerous Adventures =

1994 video game

- Developer: Radical Entertainment
- Publisher: Accolade
- Producers: Todd Thorson; Ian Verchere
- Programmers: Mark Slemko; Lennox Ong
- Artists: Thom Bellaire; Yayoi Maruno; Rob Oliveira; Ryan Slemko; Ian Verchere
- Composers: Marc Baril; Paul Wilkinson
- Series: Speed Racer
- Platform: Super NES
- Release: NA: November 1994
- Genres: Racing, action
- Modes: Single-player, multiplayer

Speed Racer in My Most Dangerous Adventures is a racing video game developed by Radical Entertainment and published in 1994 by Accolade for the Super Nintendo Entertainment System.

== Gameplay ==
This video game combines elements of racing and platform games. Speed has to take his car, the Mach Five, to travel the world and win every grand prix there is. Infamous villains from the animated series are out there to capture Trixie, Speed's girlfriend, and he must stop them all. One of the first races takes place in New York City, with every race having at least eight drivers (including Speed).

== Development ==
By the early 1990s, the Speed Racer anime had achieved a cult following in the United States due to twice-daily airings on MTV. This inspired Accolade to develop Speed Racer in The Challenge of Racer X for MS-DOS, and to develop further Speed Racer games for the Super NES and Genesis. When Accolade approached Radical Entertainment, the developer of Accolade's previous Pelé! and Brett Hull Hockey titles, they found that Radical had tried to license the game itself a year earlier; according to Radical producer Ian Verchere, "It was one of the first letters I wrote when we first started developing games". The Super NES and Genesis games were made in different genres to accommodate the difference in the consoles' capabilities. While the Genesis version would be a pure racing game, the Super NES game is more story-driven and features both driving and adventure levels as a closer reflection of the anime. Two distinct engines were designed for each level style, with the driving levels using Mode 7 technology for the creation of hills. Accolade producer Todd Thorson also cited the difference in audience between the consoles as a reason for creating different Speed Racer titles, stating that the Genesis's older audience would desire more racing action, while the Super NES's younger audience would be more accustomed to side-scrolling gameplay. Radical experienced little difficulty in capturing the anime's campy quality, and pointed out that having pre-existing settings and characters to work from made production easier.

Mark Slemko and Lennox Ong programmed the game, while the graphics were created by Thom Bellaire, Yayoi Maruno, Rob Oliveira, Ryan Slemko, and Ian Verchere. The game was Marc Baril's debut work as a video game composer, having been a regular jamming partner of Radical's in-house audio programmer Paul Wilkinson. Baril was subsequently offered a full-time position at Radical, becoming the first dedicated audio creator to be hired by the company.

== Reception ==
GamePro commented that the action, graphics, and controls on the racing segments are "second to none for challenging fun", while those of the action/adventure segments are consistently poor. They concluded the game is overall recommended for fans of the TV series.

Entertainment Weekly gave the game a C− and wrote that "Okay, so it's overexposed from MTV's recent heavy rotation. Still, Speed Racer In: My Most Dangerous Adventures is a blast for the nostalgia it's capable of provoking in baby boomers — a feeling those boomers won't get if they pick up this ho-hum adaptation of the hit cartoon. Accolade nails the campy, hardware-heavy Racer mystique just once, and that's in the manual, with detailed specs for the Mach 5's space age equipment. But the game's racing sequences are a big snooze — if it's G force you're after, there are three-year-old cartridges for the Super NES that go much, much faster."
