= Speed Racer =

Japanese anime television series

- マッハ GoGoGo(ゴーゴーゴー)
- Genre: Sports
- Created by: Tatsuo Yoshida
- Directed by: Hiroshi Sasagawa (chief)
- Music by: Nobuyoshi Koshibe
- No. of episodes: 52 (list of episodes)

Production
- Production company: Tatsunoko Production

Original release
- Network: Fuji TV
- Release: April 2, 1967 – March 31, 1968

Related
- Manga
- Written by: Tatsuo Yoshida
- Published by: Shueisha; Sun Wide Comics
- English publisher: NA: NOW Comics; Wildstorm Productions; Digital Manga Publishing
- Magazine: Shōnen Book
- Original run: June 1966 – May 1968
- Volumes: 2
- Manga

Mach GoGoGo!
- Written by: Toshio Tanigami
- Published by: Shogakukan
- Magazine: CoroCoro Comic
- Original run: January 1997 – October 1997
- Volumes: 2
- Related works
- The New Adventures of Speed Racer; Speed Racer X; The Next Generation; Speed Racer (NOW Comics); Racer X (NOW Comics); Speed Racer: Chronicles of the Racer; Speed Racer: Born to Race; Racer X (Tommy Yune prequel); Speed Racer (live action film)

Speed Racer, also known as Mach GoGoGo (Japanese: マッハGoGoGo(ゴーゴーゴー), Hepburn: Mahha GōGōGō), is a Japanese anime television series produced by Tatsunoko Production, that aired on Fuji Television from April 1967 to March 1968. In the United States, the show aired in syndication at approximately the same time. A manga adaptation written and illustrated by Tatsuo Yoshida was originally serialized in print in Shueisha's 1966 Shōnen Book magazine. It was released in tankōbon form by Sun Wide Comics and later re-released in Japan by Fusosha.

Selected chapters of the manga were released by NOW Comics in the 1990s under the title Speed Racer Classics. These were later released by Wildstorm Productions, a division of DC Comics, as Speed Racer: The Original Manga. In 2008, under its Americanized title, Speed Racer, Mach GoGoGo was republished in its entirety in the United States by Digital Manga Publishing and was released as a boxed set to commemorate the series' 40th anniversary, as well as serving as a tie-in with the 2008 film. The television series was very successful in the United States and defined anime in that country until the 1990s, being watched by a total estimated audience of 40 million viewers during the 1960s–1970s.

== Media ==
=== Anime ===
The actual series was inspired by Yoshida's earlier and more popular automobile racing comics, Pilot Ace. Pilot Ace's main storyline formed the structure for Mach GoGoGo, which followed the adventures of an ambitious young man who soon became a professional racer.

The characters' designs in Pilot Ace set the main ground for the character design in Mach GoGoGo. Yoshida got his idea for the story after seeing two films that were very popular in Japan at the time, Viva Las Vegas and Goldfinger. By combining the look of Elvis Presley's race-car driving image, complete with neckerchief and black pompadour, and James Bond's gadget-filled Aston Martin DB5, Yoshida had the inspiration for his creation. Soon enough, Mach GoGoGo hit shelves in the early 1960s. The central character in the anime and manga was a young race car driver named Gō Mifune (Mifune Gō).

Fifty-two episodes were produced from 1967 to 1968. In 1997, Tatsunoko produced a modernized version of Mach GoGoGo that aired on TV Tokyo, lasting for 34 episodes. An English-language adaptation of this remake was produced by DiC titled Speed Racer X, which aired in 2002 on Nickelodeon. Only the first 13 episodes were adapted due to licensing disputes between DiC and Speed Racer Enterprises. Mach Girl was a web-based series by Tatsunoko Productions, created by Tatsuo Yoshida's daughter, Suzuka.

The title sequence of Speed Racer shows an early anime example of Bullet time: at the end, as Speed leaps from the Mach 5, he freezes in mid-jump, and the "camera" does an arc shot from front to sideways.

==== English-language adaptation ====
The English-language rights to Mach GoGoGo were acquired by syndicator Trans-Lux, and Speed Racer premiered on American television in the summer of 1967. In the series, Speed's full name was Go Mifune, in homage to Japanese film star Toshiro Mifune. His name, Americanized, became Speed Racer. His adventures centered on his powerful Mach 5 car, his girlfriend Trixie, his little brother Spritle, Spritle's pet chimpanzee Chim-Chim, his father "Pops" Racer, and his mysterious older brother, Racer X, whose real name was Rex Racer.

For American consumption, major editing and dubbing efforts were undertaken by producer Peter Fernandez, who likewise not only wrote and directed the English-language dialogue but also provided the voices of many of the characters, most notably Racer X and Speed Racer himself. Fernandez was also responsible for a rearrangement of the theme song's melody, written and composed by Nobuyoshi Koshibe, and he subsequently also wrote its English lyrics.

A Speed Racer daily comic strip written and drawn by Mort Todd ran in the New York Post from 2000–2001.

At Otakon 2015, Funimation announced that it had acquired the license to Speed Racer from Tatsunoko and would release it on Blu-ray for the first time. Funimation gave Speed Racer two separate home video releases: a standard release for the English version on May 30, 2017, and a collector's edition for the Japanese version with English subtitles on November 7, 2017, the first such North American release.

On May 2, 2024, Shout! Studios took over the US distribution rights to Speed Racer from Crunchyroll (the successor to Funimation), which began with the digital release of the original television series of the same name and its Japanese-language version on June 1 of that year. Shout! will also re-release the series on Blu-ray August 25, 2026.

==== Reception of English language edition ====
IGN ranked the original Speed Racer series at #29 on its "Best 100 Animated Series" list.

In a retrospective review in Issue 9 of the games magazine Gateways, Jape Trostle noted, "Although the animation was often shoddy and of assembly line quality, it was one of the first cartoons that had the distinctive 'Japanimation' look that was to have an incredible impact on the present-day look of all animation."

=== Manga adaptation ===
Tatsuo Yoshida's Mach GoGoGo manga. Top Row: Volume 1, Volume 2 Bottom Row: Volume 1 (reprint), Sun Wide Comics release

The manga adaptation (compiled into two deluxe volumes for Fusosha's re-release) has several storylines, such as "The Great Plan", "Challenge of the Masked Racer", "The Fire Race", "The Secret Engine", and "Race for Revenge", that were in the anime. However, minor changes occur between both the manga and the anime series, such as differences between the back stories of several characters and places, this was due to the anime being in production at that time and as a result, earlier drafts from the episodes were used.

Selected chapters of the original Mach GoGoGo manga series were reprinted by NOW Comics as two volumes of Speed Racer Classics (1988–1989), and by DC Comics/Wildstorm Productions as Speed Racer: The Original Manga (2000). In 2008, a hardcover boxed set of the complete manga series was released by Digital Manga Publishing as the two volume Speed Racer: Mach Go Go Go.

== Development ==
=== Names ===
The large red M on the hood of the Mach 5, as well as on Gō's helmet, is the emblem of Mifune Motors, the family business, and an homage to Japanese film star Toshiro Mifune. In North America, it was assumed to stand for Mach 5, and in the Latin American version for Meteoro. His given name, Gō, is a Japanese homophone for the number 5 (the number on his race car), which is also represented by the yellow letter G embroidered on his short-sleeve blue shirt. The tradition of symbolism on characters' shirts was also used on Michi (Trixie) and Sabu (Sparky), who had the letter "M" and "S" on their shirts, respectively.

=== Audience ===
The overall purpose of the anime was to please a growing fan base worldwide with exciting stories that involved facing adversity on the race track and beyond. Review of the episodes in the Speed Racer: Collector's Edition of Japanese and English-language episodes reveals frequent changes to the soundtrack (dialogue and the addition of an off-screen narrator) but very little editing of the image-track. Most significantly, the names of villains are often changed to be more cartoony, e.g. Professor Anarchy in episode 31 ("Lightning-Quick Ninja Cars" in Japanese, "Gang of Assassins" in English).

== Characters ==
=== Racer family ===
Speed Racer / Gō Mifune (三船 剛, Mifune Gō)

Voiced by: Katsuji Mori (Japanese); Peter Fernandez (English)

From left to right: Chim-Chim (Sanpei), Pops (Daisuke Mifune), Mom (Aya Mifune), Spritle (Kurio Mifune), Speed (Go Mifune), and Trixie (Michi Shimura) in the Mach 5

The protagonist of both the anime and the manga is Speed Racer, originally Gō Mifune. He is known for his love of racing and valuing his family. He drives the Mach 5 (as well as other cars, such as the Mach 6 in the movie) and always manages to wind up in extreme danger with either his younger brother or his girlfriend Trixie. Speed is shown to miss his older brother, Rex (secretly disguised as Racer X), in both versions. He is portrayed by Emile Hirsch in the 2008 film, while his younger self is portrayed by Nicholas Elia.
Off the track, he wears a blue shirt with an orange "G" (standing for his Japanese first name, Gō) with a white collar, a red racing bandanna around his neck, white pants, red socks, brown loafers, and yellow gloves. He is 18 years old, has a brown, almost black pompadour, and his eyes are brown (in the anime version, they are blue). In racing, he sports a white open-face helmet with an M (representing Mifune Motors) on top. In the anime, on special occasions, Speed wears a red blazer with a yellow "G" embroidered on it. In the live-action film, he wears a white leather racing jacket unzipped over his classic outfit. He wears his classic outfit (without the embroidered "G") in the first half of the Casa Cristo 5000. To strengthen the character's back-story continuity between Speed and his older brother Rex, Speed's red socks were considered "lucky socks."

Spritle Racer / Kurio Mifune (三船 くりお, Mifune Kurio) and Chim-Chim (三平, Sanpei)

Voiced by: Junko Hori (Spritle), Hiroshi Ohtake (Chim-Chim) (Japanese); Corinne Orr (Spritle), Jack Grimes (Chim-Chim) (English)
Speed Racer has a younger brother named Spritle (Kurio Mifune in the Japanese original). Spritle has a pet chimpanzee, who responded to the name of Chim-Chim in the American version (Sanpei in the Japanese original). Their rebellious attitudes often lead them to trouble. Often in Speed's way, their mischief somehow aids Speed away from danger. Spritle and Chim-Chim dress in identical jumpsuits and striped hats and often perform identical physical actions. They both have an extreme appetite for candy, and they are usually bribed with dessert or other presents. Spritle and Chim-Chim often use a slingshot to combat any threats that come to both themselves and/or Speed.
According Peter Fernandez's introduction in the American release of the Mach GoGoGo manga, Spritle got his name for being an energetic "sprite." Chim-Chim got his name because he was considered a chimpanzee. In the live-action film, they are portrayed faithfully to their characterizations in both the anime and manga. Spritle was portrayed by Paulie Litt in the film.

Pops Racer / Daisuke Mifune (三船 大介, Mifune Daisuke)

Voiced by: Teiji Ōmiya (Japanese); Jack Curtis (English)
Speed's father, Pops, (Daisuke Mifune) is a former wrestler-turned race car owner and builder. After quitting his job in a corporate car manufacturing company, he founded his own company, Mifune Motors. (In America, the company was changed to Racer Motors.) He is portrayed as a hothead who is overprotective of his family. His eldest son, Rex, ran away (although he would return as Racer X). In addition to Spritle and Chim-Chim, Pops' attitude is a running gag in the anime series as well as the live-action film. Overweight, he wears an athletic red shirt and a beige mechanic's cap. Despite his build, Pops is nearly unmatched in combat, as he was once a champion heavyweight wrestler. His design skills allow him to create powerful engines, especially his (in the film) prized "Mach" Series, giving the car the ability to travel at high speeds while sustaining maximum performance. He is portrayed by actor John Goodman in the 2008 film.

Mom Racer / Aya Mifune (三船 アヤ, Mifune Aya)

Voiced by: Ryōko Kinomiya (Japanese); Corinne Orr (English)
Speed's mother, Mom Racer (originally Aya Mifune), is a side character in the series. She rarely appears in the anime or manga, having limited dialogue, and many episodes of the anime did not feature her at all. In the live-action film, however, she is portrayed by Susan Sarandon as an encouraging parental figure.

Racer X (The Masked Racer) (覆面 レーサー, Fukumen Rēsā) / Rex Racer / Kenichi Mifune (三船健一, Mifune Ken'ichi)

Voiced by: Kinya Aikawa (Japanese); Peter Fernandez (English)

Racer X

The enigmatic Racer X (Fukumen Racer in the Japanese version) is a frequent recurring character, driving car number 9, the "Shooting Star". Racer X is a mysterious, selfless, sympathetic, and often brooding soldier of fortune whose secret identity is that of Rex Racer (Kenichi Mifune in Japan), Speed's older brother. Six years prior, Rex had a falling out with Pops after wrecking a race car that Pops had built. Pops had told Rex prior to the race that he was not prepared to compete at the professional racing level. With less than one lap to go, Rex was leading and cruising toward victory, but lost control of the car, wrecking it. Pops exploded with anger and berated Rex, and in response, Rex exiled himself, vowing to become the world's greatest race car driver. In both Speed Racer X and in the 2008 movie, Rex is thought to have died in that accident. In the film, he is portrayed by Matthew Fox, while his younger self is portrayed by Scott Porter.
Pops and Speed always acknowledged that Racer X was the superior driver and the greatest driver that they had ever seen; however, Speed still vowed to defeat Racer X. In the anime, Speed was often suspicious of Racer X's identity and motives because Racer X would sacrifice winning races to protect Speed from drivers who tried to harm him. The assistance from Racer X nearly always led to Speed winning races, while Racer X came in second place. Racer X always left the scene unnoticed, receding into his secret life.

=== Supporting characters ===
Trixie / Michi Shimura (志村 美智, Shimura Michi)

Voiced by: Yoshiko Matsuo (eps. 1–4), Michiko Nomura (eps. 5–52) (Japanese); Corinne Orr (English)
Trixie, or Michi Shimura (named after actor Takashi Shimura, who collaborated with Toshiro Mifune on several films), is Speed's girlfriend. The "M" adorning her blouse stands for Michi. Trixie often flies around in a helicopter during a race, acting as Speed's spotter, a function she also serves in the live-action film during the Casa Cristo 5000. In the manga, it is mentioned that her father is the president of Shimura Aviation, which explains why she has her own helicopter. To add comic relief in the anime, Trixie becomes jealous if Speed pays too much attention to another girl or if she feels ignored. In the 2008 live-action film, she is portrayed by actress Christina Ricci, while her younger self was played by Ariel Winter. She had an auburn bob cut with bangs; in the anime, her hair was dark brunette.
Unlike most female characters in cartoons at that time, Trixie is not portrayed as a helpless perpetual victim. In addition to frequently providing helicopter backup, Trixie often proves herself the equal of Speed when forced into physical altercations. While Trixie has been captured on occasion by the villains, she refuses to cower or plead for her release, more often giving the bad guy a serious tongue-lashing until she is either rescued or escapes on her own. On some occasions, Trixie has even been the one to rescue Speed or other male characters from their predicaments. In the spin-off, Speed Racer: The Next Generation, she is assumed to be the mother of X and Speed Jr.
Casually, Trixie wears a pink blouse with the aforementioned M on her left side. She also wears red pants. In racing events, she wears a white long-sleeve shirt underneath pink overalls, which also have the embroidered M. During races, she also wears a pink cap with racing goggles. On special occasions, Trixie wears a blue hat and dress.

Sparky (サブ, Sabu)

Voiced by: Kei Tomiyama (Japanese); Jack Grimes (English)
Other regular characters included Sparky, whose full name in the movie and in Speed Racer: The Next Generation is Wilson Sparkolemew (in the manga and anime, he is only called Sparky). In the Japanese original, he was Sabu, and he was Bujía in the Latin American version. He is the company mechanic, a quirky young man who is a best friend of Speed and knows everything about cars. In the live-action movie, he is portrayed as older than Speed, but is still his close friend. He wears a yellow shirt bearing the letter S. He is portrayed by actor Kick Gurry in the live-action film. He makes a cameo in Speed Racer: The Next Generation.

The Car Acrobatic Team

The Car Acrobatic Team (or Car Acrobats) is one of the original set of characters appearing in both the manga and anime. The 16 racers' uniforms are embroidered with a letter from the English alphabet. All of the cars in the team (automobiles numbered 11 through 26), except for number 11, look and act the same. The cars sprout wings from both sides, making them capable of jumping large gaps and gorges. The most notable of the team are Captain Terror and Snake Oiler (the latter being a character exclusive to the anime).
Captain Terror, the leader of the Car Acrobatic Team, is shown as an arrogant driver in the manga, sabotaging races for his own benefit. His arrogance gets the best of him, and he gets severely injured in an explosion after not heeding Speed's warning about his car leaking oil. He has a Z embroidered on his racing uniform, a face of skeletal features, and a lone feather atop his helmet. He drives the number 11 car, the only car different in appearance to the rest of the Car Acrobatic team.
In the anime, Captain Terror's character exists, but many of his appearances are played by a new character, Snake Oiler. He replaces Captain Terror in terms of hotheaded attitude. Embroidered with an "S" on his uniform and tinted visor on his striped helmet, Snake Oiler drives the number 12 car, similar in appearance to the other cars in the Car Acrobatic Team. The role Captain Terror had in the manga was lifted onto the Snake Oiler character; therefore, Captain Terror's role in the Alpine Race (and injuries from a crash related to an oil leak) was replaced by Snake. Although Snake did not exist in the original manga, he was notable in the West due to his appearance in the anime. Snake Oiler's name and acrobatic skills are an homage to Haro Bora.
In the live-action movie, Snake has completely changed in appearance. Since the Car Acrobatic Team didn't exist in the film, he is instead the leader of his own racing team, named "Hydra-Cell". He wears large sunglasses and sports a black pompadour. His racing uniform is made entirely of snake skin (complete with a yellow snake on his helmet), and his car is completely orange. Despite the change in appearance, Snake's car number and attitude are still intact in the film. He is portrayed by Christian Oliver.
In the next-to-last episode of the original series, the Car Acrobatic Team and Speed are tricked into racing against each other in a grudge race by a terrorist organization hoping to use the race as a means to kill Speed and Racer X. After the two sides learn of the deception (which involved planting time bombs in the Car Acrobatic Team's cars), they agree to a truce in order to foil the plan. The Car Acrobatic Team park their cars around the terrorists' secret headquarters, and the explosion destroys the building and kills the leaders. After that, Speed and Captain Terror part amicably, with Terror wishing Speed the best of luck next time they meet. Snake Oiler does not appear in the episode.
In Speed Racer: The Next Generation, Zile Zazic was seen wearing a racing outfit similar to Captain Terror's during the "Comet Run" episodes, implying that Zile was Captain Terror. Stan, Zile's main henchman, also noted that Speed Racer had raced against Zile's racing team at one point.

== Vehicles ==
Many of the show's cars have special abilities in the series. *Note: The names of the cars that have appeared in both the manga and the original anime have been fitted with Italics.

=== The Mach 5 ===
Side view of the Mach 5

The Mach 5, Speed Racer's car ("Mahha Gō", or "Mahha", in the Japanese version), is a technological marvel, containing useful pieces of equipment. Gō Mifune/Speed Racer easily deployed these gadgets by pressing buttons marked "A" through "G" on the steering wheel hub (although there are buttons on the steering wheel in the manga, the letter designations are exclusive to the anime and the 2008 live action film). This uniquely designed car, built with a sleek Coke bottle bodystyle, has a white exterior with a large "M" on its hood, the logo for the family business, Mifune Motors (changed to Pops Motors in the anime and Racer Motors in the live action film). The two-seat car had a mostly red-colored interior. The number 5 is emblazoned on both side doors of the car. In the manga and anime, this is the car's racing number; in the film, it is because it is the fifth car built in Pops' "Mach" series of racing vehicles. Although technically inferior to other racing vehicles such as the Mammoth Car and the GRX, the Mach 5 manages to win most races because of Speed's superior driving skills.

The Mach 5 has been stolen from Speed a few times, once when Cornpone Blotch took the car to add it to his car collection in the "Girl Daredevil" saga. However, Speed always gets it back at the end of the episode. At one point, the car was replicated, functions and all, by Dr. Nightcall. However, this replica included other new abilities that inspired later functions of the car in remakes of the show, one of which were the Aero-Jacks, used as a replacement for the Auto Jacks in Speed Racer X. In manga continuity, the Mach 5 was destroyed and rebuilt. See Manga and Anime Differences for more information on the Mach 5's manga continuity.

In both American comic and movie continuity, Pops is portrayed as having built a "Mach" Series consisting of other variants, such as the Mach 4 and Mach 6, in addition to Rex Racer's Mach 1 and the Mach 5.

=== The Shooting Star ===
The Mysterious Racer X and his vehicle, the Shooting Star

The Shooting Star is Racer X's car, colored bright yellow with a black front bumper and numbered 9 on the hood and sides. The car's engine is located in the back, and it is a very agile machine, often displaying abilities akin to and even above those of the Mach Five. Many of its high-tech features allowed Racer X to keep an eye on Speed Racer, who is his younger brother.

In later comics written by Tommy Yune, Rex acquires the car that he names the "Shooting Star" from Prince Kabala of Kapetapek. During his time training with the royal leader, Rex is informed that he is the ninth student of Kabala, hence the number 9. Rex also builds other cars numbered 9 with similar paint schemes and names them with variants like the "Falling Star."

In the 2008 film adaptation, the car makes an appearance but is not named. The car was the only car built in addition to the Mach Five for the movie, and it features weapons like machine guns mounted above the cockpit and under the chassis. In addition to this car, Racer X also drives a car built for the competitions in the film, a T180. This car was titled the "Augury" in the film's video game counterpart. Like Racer X's unnamed street car, it features a number 9 and has the black and yellow color scheme, with a large black "X" on the front bumper. The T180 only makes one appearance in the film, when Racer X competes to protect Speed in the Fuji race after he has rejected Royalton's offer.

=== The Mammoth Car ===
Appearing only in the anime, it is supposedly the largest racing vehicle in the world. Similar in design to a road train, the Mammoth Car is mostly red and is built by Speed Racer villain Cruncher Block. The Mammoth Car was built almost entirely of $50,000,000 in stolen gold bars. This amount of gold, however, would actually occupy only 74 cubic feet, based on the then price of gold of $35 per ounce. By entering it in "The No Limit World Race", Cruncher wished to smuggle the gold out of the country. The Mammoth Car's main engine has 7,500 horsepower (5,600 kW). Each wheel also has an engine with 1,500 horsepower (1,100 kW), giving it a total of 30,000 horsepower (22,000 kW). It can travel at 500 mph (800 km/h), on any kind of road or terrain. It makes screeching sounds reminiscent of Godzilla. It has magnetic brakes and is over 200 yards (180 m) long, making the Mammoth Car one of the most interesting cars in the series. It was destroyed after it crashed into an oil refinery and melted into its original gold form by the intense heat.

The Mammoth Car makes a small cameo in the 2008 film in the scene where Cruncher Block interrogates Taejo Togokhan (a character created for the movie) after he resists Royalton Industries in the race-fixing business. They were interrupted by Racer X, who battles the Mammoth and saves Taejo. The Mammoth Car in this movie is shown to have view ports for its drivers to shoot out of, just like in the original series, and it is shown to fire missiles from its grille.

The Mammoth Car also makes an appearance along with Flash Marker Jr.'s X3 in Speed Racer: The Next Generation in the second and third episodes of "The Fast Track" saga, as an enemy program of the show's virtual racing track. Although the Mammoth Car is rendered in CGI after its original anime design, the car is missing its grille and many other details that had appeared in the original anime. The Mammoth Car in this episode makes the same sound as it did in the anime. It pays homage to the original series by using its signature attack of surrounding and circling a rival.

=== The Melange and the X3 ===
The Melange was a roofless racing car numbered with a "3", driven by Flash Marker. When investigating the mysterious car, Speed recalls that the name Melange was the name of Napoleon's horse, who saved his life several times in battles. (The name was actually Marengo but became Melange due to an erroneous transliteration from Japanese to English.) When Speed recalls his knowledge of French history, a rendition of Jacques-Louis David's painting of Napoleon Crossing the Alps, which depicts Napoleon riding Marengo, is drawn in the episode. Pops Racer, however, identified the name "Melange" as a car driven 15 years earlier by a young driver named Flash Marker. The Melange's chassis was colored with two shades of purple and had an exposed engine on its hood. During the "Race at Danger Pass", the Melange, along with Marker, was finally destroyed in a crash caused by the Three Roses Club.

Since then, Flash's son, Flash Marker Jr., had plotted revenge on the Three Roses Club by building a car with a sleek, black body marked "X3." The car was driven through remote control, and a robot dummy was placed in the driver's seat, broadcasting the phrases "Melange still races" and "Melange is alive" to haunt the Three Roses Club. The X3 was used primarily to deliberately crash into and kill those affiliated with the Three Roses Club, leaving behind a card marked X3 to taunt the remaining members. Speed, who had volunteered to help the police, was chasing down the X3 when it narrowly avoided colliding with a train, leaving the robot dummy hanging over the level crossing's boom gate.

Speed noticed its robot "driver" and brought it back to the police for further investigation. Meanwhile, Flash Marker Jr. secretly brought back the damaged car and replaced its body with a replica of the original Melange, placing it over the X3 chassis in his secret underground car factory, to prepare for the next Race at Danger Pass. Since it is the same car with the chassis of the Melange, the car can still be controlled remotely. While the new Melange is still numbered "3", it has the ability to be changed through remote control to X3, which makes the drivers of the Three Roses Club realize that the "new Melange" is actually the X3. The car, controlled by Flash Jr. in his helicopter, was used to fatally crash into two Three Roses drivers before it was destroyed when it lost control and crashed into the final member of the Three Roses Club.

The first episode has been translated into Armenian, using the Western Armenian dialect.

=== The GRX ===
The GRX was technically an engine, but it has become more identified with the gold-colored car that housed the engine in the series episode "The Fastest Car on Earth." The engine was designed by Ben Cranem, and it was responsible for the crashes and deaths of four test drivers and its inventor due to the impossible speeds it could attain. Cranem died, and the GRX engine was buried with him, but Oriana Flub and her men exhumed the engine and placed it into the car with a sleek, golden, and markless body.

Oriana convinced Speed to test drive the car with the GRX, and Speed was sprayed with a special serum known as the V-gas to artificially sharpen his reflexes. The V-gas causes its driver to become extremely thirsty, and if the driver consumed any compound containing water, they would develop a strong phobia of speed. The car got a new driver, Cranem's son, Curly. Curly was given the V-gas and soon experienced its side effects. The GRX and its engine were destroyed when he fatally crashed the car due to Curly drinking water during a pit stop.

The GRX episodes mark one of the few continuity errors introduced by the English dubbing. In the first episode the GRX's speedometer with a maximum speed of 400 kilometres per hour (250 mph) on it is shown in the beginning of the episode, however, due to a continuity error in the Japanese animation, as Speed drives it, the speedometer tops out at 440 kilometres per hour (270 mph) This would make the GRX slower than the Mammoth Car by the English dialogue.

In the 2008 film adaptation, the name makes an appearance as a car developed by Royalton Industries and driven by Jack "Cannonball" Taylor. The car retains none of the backstory from its anime counterpart. It is numbered 66 and colored purple and gold and was transformed from a two-seater to a single-seater. In the Grand Prix race that closes the film, the GRX is the main competitor for Speed in the Mach 6 and features a secret weapon called a "spear-hook" that is illegal in professional racing. After Taylor deploys the device against Speed during the Grand Prix, Speed uses the Mach 6's auto-jacks to flip the cars and reveal the hook to the track cameras, automatically disqualifying Taylor and aiding the case built by Inspector Detector against Royalton.

== Speed Racer Enterprises ==
The show's mainstream success in the United States spawned an ongoing Speed Racer franchise. This ranged from comics, video releases, merchandise, a live-action film, and newer series either rebooting or continuing the original series. The franchise began in the early 1990s when a company, Speed Racer Enterprises, acquired rights to the original series. At the time when the series was originally released, very little merchandise was released in the United States. However, during the series' re-airing during the 1990s, Speed Racer Enterprises was responsible for the creation of actual Speed Racer merchandise, ranging from small collectible die-cast cars to action figures to home video releases of episodes from the original series. Speed Racer Enterprises was also involved in creating original American takes on the Japanese series, such as The New Adventures of Speed Racer and Speed Racer: The Next Generation.

Due to Speed Racer Enterprises, the original 1967 series made a comeback through reruns on MTV, broadcast in the early morning hours. In 1993, the series was rebroadcast in syndication concurrently with a new American-created remake. Since all the rights were then under Speed Racer Enterprises, all references to the original rights holder, Trans-Lux, were removed. Therefore, the opening sequence included an entirely recreated logo, which most people are familiar with today; however when Speed Racer Enterprises authorized Volkswagen to use Speed Racer in a July 1996 GTI commercial, J.J. Sedelmaier faithfully replicated the look of the original episode title cards, including the original logo. In October 2002, DIC Entertainment acquired worldwide entertainment rights for the series, consisting of broadcast, merchandising and licensing.

This is the version that later aired on the Cartoon Network in the late afternoon (and later on in late night/overnight) programming, and it was also the version of the series that was first released on Region 1 DVD.

In December 2013, Tatsunoko gained all rights to the Speed Racer franchise, retroactively as to May 2011, as part of a settlement of lawsuits between Speed Racer Enterprises and the animation studio. Tatsunoko had claimed that SRE had exceeded its contractual rights in continuing to license the property after 2011.

=== American comic adaptations ===
NOW Comics launched an American Speed Racer comic book series in 1987. The series became a hit with the high production values of airbrush artist Ken Steacy. The comics continued for 38 issues and included a spin-off Racer X series and crossovers. A miniseries adapting The New Adventures of Speed Racer was also released, which included art by Oscar González Loyo. In 1993, NOW Comics and Antarctic Press also published a four-issue intercompany crossover between Speed Racer and the characters of Ben Dunn's Ninja High School.

In 1999, DC Comics/Wildstorm Productions released a new Speed Racer limited series, which became the #1 pick of industry publication Wizard magazine. The manga style of writer/artist Tommy Yune recaptured the look of the original anime, which was soon followed by an industry-wide revival of comic adaptations of other classic animated series. The limited series was collected as the trade paperback Speed Racer: Born to Race ISBN 1-56389-649-4, and a Racer X limited series featuring the artwork of Chinese manga artist Jo Chen.

In 2008, IDW Productions re-released the Wildstorm series as Speed Racer/Racer X: The Origins Collection, and previously published issues from NOW Comics as Speed Racer Vol. 1–5. A new limited series, Speed Racer: Chronicles of the Racer, was also produced.

Seven Seas published an adaptation by Dwayne Alexander Smith in 2007 with art by Elmer Damaso.

In 2025, Mad Cave Studios began publishing a new Speed Racer comic book series written by David Pepose and illustrated by Davide Tinto. Issue #0 was released on Free Comic Book Day on May 3, 2025. The first issue was released on July 30, 2025, to generally positive reviews, with Comic Book Round Up averaging its critic rating at 9.4/10.

=== Latin American comic adaptation ===
Editorial Abril, an Argentine company established by César Civita, published a Spanish-language comic book in the 1970s. Soon after, his brother, Victor Civita, published a comic, in Brazil through Editora Abril, which likewise commissioned original stories from local artists. In 2000, Editora Abril published a series by Tommy Yune.

=== American TV series ===
In 1993, The New Adventures of Speed Racer, an American-produced series, had a much more contemporary art style. It was not a direct continuation of the original series; therefore, it is considered a reboot. While the original series had more realistic themes, such as gang violence and family ties, this series introduced science fiction themes, like robots and mutants. Tatsunoko did not authorize the production of this series,, and it was off the air after only 13 episodes.

For the original series' 40th anniversary in 2006, a Flash-based series of "webisodes" titled Speed Racer Lives was released. This series was depicted as a continuation of the original series, taking place many years after it. The series was made available on the Internet solely to promote a new line of toys made by Art Asylum.

In 2008, Speed Racer: The Next Generation, a new series, was released on Nicktoons. Like Speed Racer Lives, this series was conceived as taking place years after the original. It focuses on the sons of the original Speed Racer. Its premiere coincided with the live-action feature film in May 2008. Peter Fernandez voices a middle-aged version of Spritle, Speed's younger brother from the original Japanese series. The show's protagonist, also named Speed, and one of Spritle's nephews, is voiced by New Jersey native Kurt Csolak. Larry Schwarz is the creator of the TV series, which is produced by Animation Collective, the creators of Kappa Mikey and Three Delivery. Like the 1993 remake, this series was not authorized by Tatsunoko. Pangea Corporation has been working with Speed Racer Enterprises for more than 20 years and has created several new show iterations.

The original series was also revived on MTV in 1993. It moved to Cartoon Network in 1996 and again to its sister network Boomerang until 2005..

In May 2022, Apple TV+ announced that a live action television series from J. J. Abrams is in development with his company Bad Robot. The series will be based on an unproduced script that Abrams had written in the 1990s.

=== Speed Racer: The Movie (1993 film) ===
In 1993, the episodes "The Car Hater" and "Race Against the Mammoth Car" were combined into a feature-length film and briefly released in theaters. It was later released on VHS and DVD and has been available on Hulu. The film also featured old commercials for Bondex ready-mix cementing, National Forest Service (featuring Smokey Bear), Flit insecticide spray, and Pure-Pak milk cartons (featuring Old King Cole), and a bonus cartoon, the Colonel Bleep episode The Treacherous Pirate.

=== Live-action film ===
The Wachowskis wrote and directed a live-action adaptation of Speed Racer, released on May 9, 2008. It was poorly received by most critics and was a box office failure, earning just under $93 million worldwide against a production budget of at least $120 million (before prints and advertising). In later years, the film would garner a strong cult following among filmmakers and audiences.

=== One-act play ===
In 1994, Pangea Corporation wrote and produced a one-act play titled Spridle: A One Man Show [sic], which debuted at San Diego Comic-Con and was a huge success. It chronicled what happened to all the Speed Racer characters after the show was canceled, following the concept that the characters were real and had private lives. Spritle, Speed's younger brother, relates the tell-all confessional piece as a disgruntled grown-up who is now sour that his career floundered after his celebrity status on the show. It was cited by Wizard magazine as one of the top 10 best sessions at Comic-Con 1994. The show was written by John Schulte and John Besmehn, produced, directed, and moderated by Cheryl Ann Wong.

=== Other appearances ===
Sequences from the original TV show were used for the entirety of Ghostface Killah's music video for "Daytona 500".

=== Merchandise ===
==== Toys ====
The first major toy line of Speed Racer was developed in 1992 by Pangea Corporation for Ace Novelty Toy Company. Products focused on both the classic Speed Racer anime program from Tatsunoko, plus a whole new line based on the Fred Wolf series, The New Adventures of Speed Racer. Lego released new Speed Racer construction sets to coincide with the release of the Speed Racer film. These include a 242-piece Speed and Snake Oiler set, a 237-piece Racer X and Taejo Togokhan set, a 367-piece Racer X and Cruncher Block set, and a 595-piece Grand Prix set, which includes Trixie, Pops, Speed, Spritle, Chim-Chim, two racers, and a racing announcer. Mattel had the master toy license for the 2008 Speed Racer film, including action figures, related vehicles, and accessories. Mattel's Hot Wheels division produced miniature replicas of the Mach 5 called the Second Wind, and their Barbie Collector division released a collector doll set featuring Trixie and Speed as they appeared in the film. Also, a Mattel product called UB FunKeys got a new patch, which included a Speed Racer zone.

Jada Toys held the rights to produce die-cast replicas of the Mach 5 from the original animated series..

Playing Mantis released a wide range of the Speed Racer die-cast miniatures, including replicas of the villains' cars and mini-dioramas under their "Johnny Lightning" line. A limited-edition release of the Mach Four from the Wildstorm comic series remains one of the hardest-to-find collectibles to this day. In 1998, Playing Mantis acquired the rights to the "Captain Action" action figure line, a vintage line about a crusading adventurer who disguises himself as famous superheroes. Playing Mantis had planned to produce new costumes of Speed Racer, Racer X, and Captain Terror for the revamp of the line, but they were never produced. Control art for the Speed Racer costume appears on the packaging of some figures, and pictures of the prototypes are available.in The Art of Speed Racer.

ReSaurus produced two series of 5-inch (127 mm) action figures, rich with articulation and accessories, as well as a full-sized Mach V in 1999. A third series of figures and a full-sized Shooting Star were planned, but the line folded before this could happen. In 2003, Toynami released a large-scale version of the Speed Racer vehicles, including a Mach 5 play set complete with all of its gadgets.The play set has since been retired. The company Polar Lights Models is currently manufacturing two 1/25-scale (according to the box) model kits in standard "glue" and snap-together variations (although the scale of the model inside is closer to 1/32). These can be built with or without the waterproof bubble canopy at the modeler's discretion. The kits feature a homing robot and separate jacks, and a rear engine (possibly a tip to NOW comics, which illustrated the engine in the rear).

ERTL produced Speed Racer's Mach 5 in 1:18 die-cast form with many features of the animated car, including pop out saw blades, ion jacks, opening doors, hood, and trunk. It includes Spritle Racer and Chim-Chim figures. Special variants were made with decals celebrating Racer X and other characters from the series as part of the 35th Anniversary Edition in 2001. A similar die-cast version of Racer X's Shooting Star was produced as well.

Art Asylum made a line of toys consisting primarily of their block-figure Minimates in 2006.

==== Video games ====
In 1992, Accolade published Speed Racer in The Challenge of Racer X for MS-DOS. Two years later, Accolade published Speed Racer in My Most Dangerous Adventures for Super NES, which was developed by Radical Entertainment.

In 1993, Pangea Corporation created and authored a CD-ROM title that featured game elements, a video clip creator that allowed players to make a classic Speed Racer mash-up moment, along with other themed interactive content. It was marketed under the name "The Compleat Speed Racer."

Namco released a Speed Racer arcade video game in 1995.

Speed Racer was released for the PlayStation. It was published in Japan by Tomy in 1996 and in North America by Jaleco in 1998.

A video game based on the 1997 series, simply titled Mach Go Go Go, was released by TOSE and Tomy for the Game Boy (with Super Game Boy support) in Japan.

In 2006, a joint production of enterthemonkey.com and blitinteractive.com, titled Speed Racer — The Great Plan, was released as a Web browser game to Shockwave.com. The game has all the original voices, sounds, and Mach 5 controls from the original television show. The game features the operational steering wheel buttons from the original animated series. Each button activates a customized accessory to avoid obstacles and take on rough terrains.

Speed Racer: The Videogame, a game based on the movie, was released for the Wii, Nintendo DS, and PlayStation 2 platforms. Stars Emile Hirsch (Speed), Christina Ricci (Trixie), and Matthew Fox (Racer X) reprised their roles.

During an interview with Siliconera, Capcom producer Ryota Niitsuma commented that Speed Racer was considered for the roster of Tatsunoko vs. Capcom: Ultimate All-Stars, but because he was purely a race car driver, making him fit into a fighting game was unfeasible.

==== DVD releases ====
Artisan Home Entertainment/Lionsgate Entertainment (through Family Home Entertainment) released episodes 1 through 11 of the original series in DVD format in the United States and Canada on April 22, 2003. This turned out to be the first in a series of five DVD re-releases of the show. The second volume, containing episodes 12 through 23, went on sale on May 18, 2004. The DVD came in a special package where a person could push a button on the cover and the Mach 5's headlights would light up, while a portion of the show's English theme song played. Volumes 1 and 2 were re-released as a two-disc set on April 20, 2010. The third volume originally came out on May 24, 2005, with the discs packaged in a round metal box made to resemble the steering wheel of the Mach 5. It contains episodes 24 through 36. This volume was later released to promote the live-action film in a standard keep case. Lionsgate Family Entertainment released the fourth volume, which featured episodes 37 through 44, on March 14, 2006; this volume included a die-cast toy Mach 5. The last episode, "Race the Laser Tank", was time-compressed (in other words, sped up), similar to when Cartoon Network aired the series in the mid-1990s. Although nothing was removed from the episode, the higher-pitched voices of the characters and the diminished quality of the episode due to the time compression upset some fans. The fifth and last volume was released on October 31, 2006. This volume included episodes 45 through 52, and for a limited time, it came with a miniature license plate with the inscription, "Go-Speed Racer-Go!"

The entire anime series was released in Australia on April 30, 2008, and in the United States on October 7. The US release of the entire anime series is a repackaging of all five individually released volumes into a comic book-style boxed set in an homage to the Mach GoGoGo manga. In addition, a bonus disc containing special features and an episode of Speed Racer: The Next Generation is included. These six discs were packaged in an exclusive die-cast casing modeled after the Mach 5.

All previous DVD releases went out of print after Tatsunoko gained worldwide rights to the franchise.

After Funimation garnered the rights, it released the English version on separate DVD and Blu-ray sets on May 30, 2017. On November 7, it released a Blu-ray + DVD Combo Collector's Edition of both the English and Japanese versions, as well as the Japanese version of Speed Racer X, known as Mach Go Go Go: Restart on DVD. This version has a bust of Speed Racer with sound effects, as well as a key chain and an exclusive interview with the voice actress of Trixie and Spritle, Corinne Orr.

In 2024, it was announced that Shout! Studios had acquired the distribution rights to the series and the original Japanese series, which was released on digital streaming on June 1, 2024.
