= Nissan Saurus =

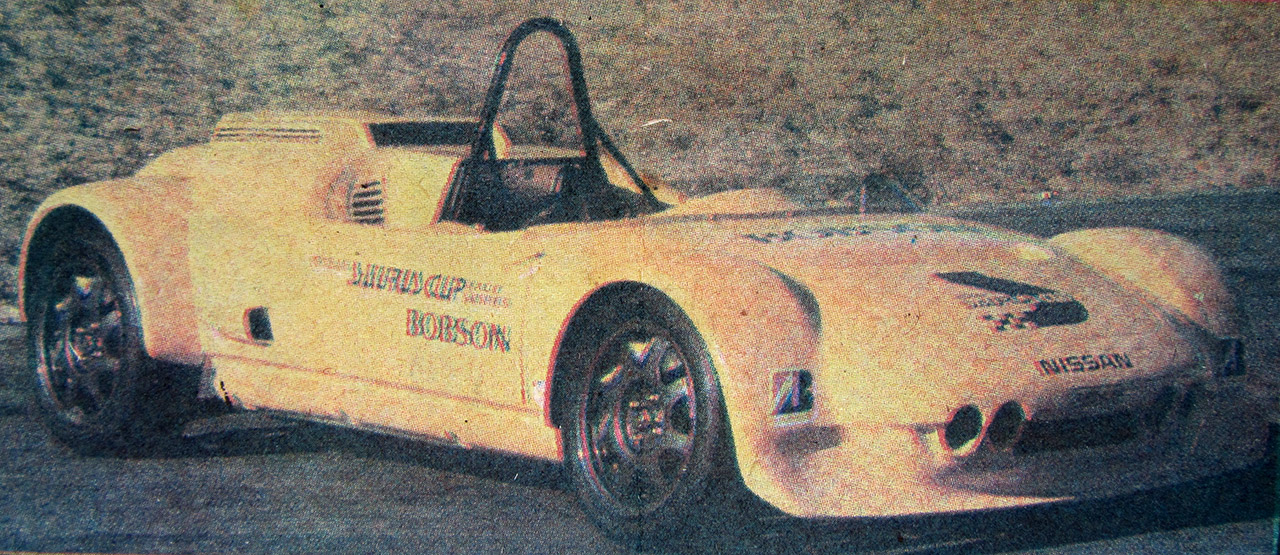

Overview
- Manufacturer: Nissan
- Production: N/A
- Model years: 1987

Body and chassis
- Body style: Roadster

Powertrain
- Engine: 2.0L with turbocharger

Dimensions
- Length: 3.3 metres (11 ft)

Chronology
- Successor: Nissan Saurus Jr.

The Nissan Saurus was a concept car designed by Nissan unveiled at the 1987 Tokyo Motor Show. It was a roadster featuring a 2.0-liter turbocharged engine, with bulging fenders and a design reminiscent of the Lotus Seven.

Nissan marketed the Saurus as part of a pair along with the Jura minivan concept, introduced as a practical complement to the roadster. This approach was very radical for the Japanese market where space for two automobiles was unrealistic for most, so it was safely assumed the Saurus concept was never meant to see production.

== Impact ==
The Saurus concept made its way into production in a modified form by Nissan's Nismo, Nissan's motor sports division. The Saurus Cup race series debuted 1989 using the Nissan Saurus Jr., a race car version of the Saurus. The series featured single seater sheet metal tub race cars with fiberglass molded bodies replicating the Saurus concept. The car was also used for Nissan Racing School. The successor to the Saurus race car, the Nissan Saurus Jr. is still used for advanced racing classes today. This car is also used for the basis of the Mach 5 (1997 Version) from Speed Racer X.

The twin-charged engine of the Saurus made its way into production in 1989 through the March/Micra Super Turbo.

The Nissan Urge concept has been compared to the Saurus.
