= List of Speed Racer episodes =

Japanese TV series

This is a list of episodes from the 1967 Japanese TV series Mach GoGoGo, released in the U.S. as Speed Racer.

== 1967 TV series ==
No.	Title	Original release date
1	"Mach 5, Let's Go! (Part 1)" / "The Great Plan: Part 1"; Transliteration: "Tobase! Mahha Gō (Zenpen)" (Japanese: 飛ばせ!マッハ号（前編）)	2 April 1967
After winning a practice race, Speed Racer is offered a driver position on the factory racing team owned by the company who employs his father, Pops Racer. Speed declines the offer because Pops is opposed to him becoming a professional driver. Meanwhile, Pops resigns his engineering job with the factory after an argument with chief engineer Mr. Van Ruffle during a board meeting where the board rejects his plans for improving the Mach 5. While Speed drives Pops home, a gang of thugs on racing bikes snatch Pop's briefcase with the plans. Speed jumps from bike to bike trying to get the plans back, but fails. He spots Trixie overhead in the helicopter and radios her to pursue the thug with the plans. She buzzes him, forcing him to drop the briefcase and crash off the edge of the mountain road. Speed recovers the briefcase. That night at the Racer home, Pops plans what he is going to do now that he has no job. He decides to remodel the Mach 5 himself, but does not know how he will come up with the money that he will need. Later, at Van Ruffle's house, the thugs explain how they failed to get the plans. Ace Deucey crashes the meeting and makes a deal with Van Ruffle to steal the plans for $5,000 (equal to $48,278 today). The next day Speed visits Sparky to let him know he is selling the Mach 5 to help raise the money Pops needs to build the new engine. Sparky suggests that Speed should enter the Sword Mountain Race for a $5,000 prize, and Speed decides to enter the race. Meanwhile, Ace pays a visit to Pops at the Racer home. Ace pulls a gun and starts searching for the plans but does not find them. Speed arrives and interrupts him. Deucey leaves, vowing to come back for the plans. Deucey did not find the plans because Pops has hidden the plans on a spare windshield using invisible ink. Taking out the Mach 5 for a road test, a dirty racer named Skull Duggery rams the car, causing Speed to throw a wheel and crash. Back at the garage, the car is repaired, but they need a new windshield. Spritle Racer and Chim Chim walk in with Pop's windshield. Ace finds out that the plans are on the windshield and goes after the Mach 5. He and his gang start to wipe out the other cars in the race. They catch up to Speed and try to run him off the road. Speed guesses where the plans are hidden and avoids getting his tires shredded by Ace's gang by hitting the auto jack button. The Mach 5 is propelled over the guardrail and down an embankment.
2	"Mach 5, Let's Go! (Part 2)" / "The Great Plan: Part 2"; Transliteration: "Tobase! Mahha Gō (Kōhen)" (Japanese: 飛ばせ!マッハ号（後編）)	9 April 1967
Speed reviews all the special features of the Mach 5. Resuming the Sword Mountain Race, Ace Deucey and his gang watch Speed race down the embankment and escape. Speed races to catch up to the rest of the racers and eventually takes the lead from Duggery, However, he soon encounters Ace and his gang racing towards him from the opposite direction. He detours off the race course and uses the rotary saws to cut a path through the overgrown terrain. Duggery follows Speed, with Ace and his gang close behind. Trixie creates a distraction by bombing the gang with smoke-filled flares from her plane. Duggery makes a decision to take a shortcut at a crossroad. Speed realizes Duggery is headed to a very dangerous volcano and follows him. Meanwhile, Trixie continues to distract Ace and his gang with smoke bombs, but they shoot and damage her plane, forcing Trixie to bail out. At the volcano's edge, Duggery is thrown from his car and is left dangling from a rock in the crater. Speed falls into the crater while looking for Duggery and lands on a ledge just above Duggery. Speed saves Duggery just as the rock gives way. They climb out of the crater, only to find Ace and his gang have arrived and have Trixie as a hostage. Ace orders his gang to finish off Speed and Ace. Just as the gang is about to finish off Speed, Spritle and Chim Chim start shooting rocks at Ace's gang from the trunk of the Mach 5 with a slingshot. Speed and Duggery take advantage of the distraction to attack the thugs, but Ace escapes in the Mach 5. Speed races in pursuit using Ace's car, but it cannot catch the Mach 5. Ace does not know how to control the special features of the Mach 5 and ends up causing the car to slow down, giving Speed a chance to catch up to him. Speed leaps into the Mach 5 and wrestles with Ace. At the last second, Speed is able to throw Ace from the car and regain control of the Mach 5 before it drives off the edge of a cliff. Speed thinks he is safe and has a moment to rest, but Ace reappears and prepares to kill Speed. Speed smashes the windshield of the Mach 5 with his helmet and leaps at Ace, throwing him over the side of the cliff. Speed watches Duggery race past in his car and resumes the race. Speed passes Duggery and wins the race, but the results of the race are nullified due to the interference of Ace and his gang.
3	"The Mysterious Masked Racer (Part 1)" / "Challenge of the Masked Racer: Part 1"; Transliteration: "Nazo no Fukumen Rēsā (Zenpen)" (Japanese: 謎の覆面レーサー（前編）)	16 April 1967
While Speed Racer and Trixie are driving to the shipyard, they both see the Masked Racer's car being held there for an upcoming Trans-Country Race. Trixie suggests that Speed should enter the race and he agrees. At the Racer homestead, Pops watches TV and learns that Speed is entering the Trans-Country Race. Now, Pops blows a gasket and has a remembrance of the time his oldest son, Rex, entered and joined a race without any permission from him. Almost close to victory, Rex crashed the car that was built for him by Pops. Although Rex was not injured, Pops forbids his son to drive again due to Rex's lack of experience. Rex made a vow to never return home. The Alpha Team is on a conference, discussing many cheating ways to win the race. Mr. Wiley suggests Mr. Fixer and the Alpha Team driver Zoomer Slick to pull the dirty tricks first. With determination to beat the Masked Racer, Speed sneaks out in the middle of the night and goes to the track. Even with the heavy rains, Speed is not soaked. Out of nowhere, the Masked Racer warns Speed to stay out of the Trans-Country Race. He declines and says he wants to beat him and the only way to do it is to race blindly into the night. Speed mysteriously crashes when an unknown person cuts a rope, causing a cascade of logs to block the track. Speed goes tumbling out of the car and falls unconscious. Note: In 1997, TV Guide ranked the first installment of The Mysterious Masked Racer (also known as The Challenge of the Masked Racer) (as well as part 2) #89 on its list of the 100 Greatest Episodes. Note: First appearance of Racer X (the Masked Racer).
4	"The Mysterious Masked Racer (Part 2)" / "The Challenge of the Masked Racer: Part 2"; Transliteration: "Nazo no Fukumen Rēsā (Kōhen)" (Japanese: 謎の覆面レーサー（後編）)	23 April 1967
After Speed's accident, the Masked Racer takes Speed to his home and he is revealed to be Speed's older brother, Rex Racer. When Speed wakes up, he takes a good look around the room and spots the Masked Racer's outfit on the chair and him in the bathroom, taking a shower. Trying on the mask, he is knocked out by an intruder. Trixie arrives and asks the Masked Racer with two other men if they have seen Speed. With no reply, they all flee, with Spritle and Chim Chim hiding in the trunk. In Wiley's mansion, the mask is removed to reveal him to be Speed. Fixer enters in with Spritle and Chim Chim now being held prisoners. Chim Chim escapes and tries to find Trixie, with Speed and Spritle are now tied up. The Masked Racer rescues them and then the mansion is caught on fire, but everyone escapes. On race day, the Racers watch the event on live television. On the track, Spritle hears Fixer give his thugs the order to fill the Masked Racer's radiator with gasoline. Spritle and Chim Chim switch the drums, causing the Alpha Team member's car to explode. The Masked Racer's tire flattens out, but he resumes the race with three wheels. Someone in the stands shines into the Masked Racer's eyes with a mirror and temporarily blinds him. With one lap remaining, Speed stops to help the Masked Racer. The Masked Racer orders Speed to continue the race. Speed wins the Trans-Country race and Pops lets Speed become a professional driver. Note: In 1997, TV Guide ranked the second installment of The Mysterious Masked Racer (along with part 1) #89 on its list of the 100 Greatest Episodes.
5	"The Secret of the Classic Car (Part 1)" / "The Secret Engine: Part 1"; Transliteration: "Kurashikku Kā no Himitsu (Zenpen)" (Japanese: クラシックカーの秘密（前編）)	30 April 1967
The elderly son of a deceased gangster drives a Model T that contains a code for a missing haul of stolen money, a haul that Tongue Blaggard, a brutal gang leader, is determined to find. During this episode, Speed attends a road racing school where Racer X suddenly appears, wheels the Mach 5 through a tricky slalom course, and thus intimidates the other drivers and the school instructor, but not Speed; Racer X also chances upon Pops, Mom and Speed, all remembering Rex and saddened in wishing he would return - a wish Rex quietly vows to someday keep. Speed Racer, Spritle, and Chim Chim go out for a test drive for the Mach 5. The radio makes an announcement that Tongue Blaggard made an escape from prison. The Racers meet a girl and her grandfather whose Model T racing car broke down on the road. Speed offered to help out, but the old man declined. Later on, the racers find the broken down Model T again. Now the old man changes his mind, and accepts Speed's help. While the Racers dine with the old man with his granddaughter and his adopted children, Blaggard steals the Model T racing car, hoping that it once belonged to the crook, Lightfingers Clepto. With the car stolen, Speed vows to bring back the stolen car back. Trixie in her helicopter spots the stolen Model T and brings it into Pops' garage for minor repairs. On his hideout, Blaggard recalls his encounter with the inmate who told him about the Model T vehicle's secret engine number that leads to the loot. Making a decision to bait Blaggard, Speed adorns the Mach 5 using a flag to bear the engine's secret code. Blaggard's men follow him while a cargo helicopter flies ahead. The thugs set a fire on Speed and the old man, until Racer X arrives to defend his brother. Instead, he ends up on the edge's cliff. The helicopter lowers a ramp to unload a squad of weapon-carrying motorcyclists.
6	"The Secret of the Classic Car (Part 2)" / "The Secret Engine: Part 2"; Transliteration: "Kurashikku Kā no Himitsu (Kōhen)" (Japanese: クラシックカーの秘密（後編）)	7 May 1967
Speed now avoids a collision with Blaggard's motorcyclist squad. Tiny, Blaggard's sumo bodyguard, knocks Speed out. Coming up with a plan to save Mr. Clepto from Tiny, Speed reveals to Blaggard the location of the $1,000,000,000. Speed phones Pops and gives Trixie a message to her: forget about the $650 ring, it is a signal for help. Guarded by Blaggard's men, Speed heads to Misty Valley using his Mach 5 where the $1,000,000,000 is located at. Speed tries to radio for help. Blaggard stops him and he accidentally sends the homing robot back home. At the Racer home, Trixie who was stood up by Speed, wakes up Pops. Spritle gives the blame to the homing robot for waking him. Trixie rushes off to search for Speed. The next day, Blaggard's thugs enters a lodge with Lana, a Misty Valley native, who is really Trixie in disguise. Back on the road, "Lana" and Speed escape and move on to the village, where Pops is waiting for them. Blaggard arrives there first. They continue on to Misty Valley. At the secret location, the loot is found. Blaggard commands his men to shoot everyone. Spritle and Chim Chim, who were hidden in Trixie's helicopter, along with a troop of monkeys, pummel the thugs with stones. Speed fights back against the thugs. Mysteriously, Racer X saves them again. Refusing to give up, Blaggard escapes to his car with the money and Speed follows him. Speed directs the homing robot to knock out the loot Blaggard has. The money spills out and disintegrates into dust. Inspector Detector arrives and rewards Speed with $100,000, which Speed donates to Mr. Clepto to start a home for homeless children. Note: First appearance of Inspector Detector (Inspector Rokugo).
7	"The Menacing Mammothmobile (Part 1)" / "The Race Against the Mammoth Car: Part 1"; Transliteration: "Manmosu Kā no Chōsen (Zenpen)" (Japanese: マンモスカーの挑戦（前編）)	14 May 1967
When Trixie was granted the position of Speed's assistant in the No Limit World Race, Inspector Detector and his officials search each entry, looking for $50,000,000 in stolen gold bars before the race begins. When the Mammoth Car enters the track, its driver gives the Inspector a tour, showing no trace of the gold. When the race begins, the Mammoth Car forces everyone off the road, making Speed a bit suspicious. On its way to discover the Mammoth Car's secret, he equips the homing robot with X-ray film so he can be able to penetrate the metal. The robot is shot at and returns home broken. Now, the Mammoth Car catches up to Speed and forces the Mach 5 off the road. When a ramp is lowered, a squad of motorcyclists descends onto the road. Racer X appears and spills oil on the road, causing the bikers to crash. At the airport, Spritle and Chim Chim stow away aboard Cruncher Block's airplane. Meanwhile on the road, the Mach 5 and the Mammoth Car both collide and veer off the road towards the forest. While Speed uses his rotary saws to cut down the trees, the Mammoth Car's power mows its own path. Speed turns around and tries to slash the car's tires, but the Mammoth Car dodges it and encircles the Mach 5. Guns emerge from its sides. Speed closes the cockpit to block the shower of bullets and escapes through a gap and plunges into a lake.
8	"The Menacing Mammothmobile (Part 2)" / "The Race Against the Mammoth Car: Part 2"; Transliteration: "Manmosu Kā no Chōsen (Kōhen)" (Japanese: マンモスカーの挑戦（後編）)	21 May 1967
Satisfied that Speed and Trixie are dead at the bottom of Lake Icy Chill, the Mammoth Car drivers continue the race. Through Speed's telescanner, he sees them leave as he reaches soil. Trixie now sends a message in the homing robot to Inspector Detector. Speed strongly suspects that the stolen gold is aboard the Mammoth Car. From his plane, Cruncher Block spots the Mach 5 back on the road. Speed and Trixie are fired upon at the refueling station. When they escape into a mining tunnel, they jump on top of a speeding trolley car before it crashes. Back at the refueling station, Spritle and Chim Chim sneak outside of Cruncher's airplane. They escape into the tunnel, which turns out to be Cruncher's headquarters. Speed and Trixie are both tied to a trolley loaded with three tons of dynamite connected to it. Racer X arrives and saves both of them. At the checkpoint, the Inspector searches the Mammoth Car. No gold is found there. When Speed reaches the checkpoint, Spritle and Chim Chim slip out to hide in the Mammoth Car. The Mach 5 and the Mammoth Car both cross the finish line and tie for first place. They continue at breakneck speed towards the shipyard. Spritle and Chim Chim both knock out the Mammoth Car's driver, while Speed jumps in and then flees with his brother and Chim Chim just as the Mammoth Car causes a collision with an oil tank, causing it to melt into a pool of molten gold. Cruncher and his men are arrested.
9	"The Nefarious Acrobat Clan (Part 1)" / "The Most Dangerous Race: Part 1"; Transliteration: "Ma no Akurobatto-zoku (Zenpen)" (Japanese: 魔のアクロバット族（前編）)	28 May 1967
Speed enters the Great Alpine Race, a brutally dangerous mountain contest, after being challenged by a belligerent racer and stunt driver, Snake Oiler, a member of a dangerous cult-like racing team, the Car Acrobatic Team. The race's danger is such that Speed's crew chief Sparky warns him against it, and infuriates Speed to where their relationship nearly ends, Even Racer X warns Speed against it. Complicating Speed's efforts even more, Pops falls violently ill while preparing the Mach 5.
10	"The Nefarious Acrobat Clan (Part 2)" / "The Most Dangerous Race: Part 2"; Transliteration: "Ma no Akurobatto-zoku (Chūhen)" (Japanese: 魔のアクロバット族（中編）)	4 June 1967
Forced to finish preparing the Mach 5 himself, Speed barely reaches the race's start, but Sparky and Trixie must rescue him when his brakes prove ineffective in a lethal mountainside curve, and after he rejoins the race, he and others run into brutal rains that wash out overhangs, forcing them to have to jump the dangerous chasms. Snake Oiler and Racer X succeed, but when Speed makes the jumps, his car crashes into a canyon and amid the wreckage and loss of life, the only sign of Speed in the fatal storm is a small doll given him by his younger brother, Spritle.
11	"The Nefarious Acrobat Clan (Part 3)" / "The Most Dangerous Race: Part 3"; Transliteration: "Ma no Akurobatto-zoku (Kōhen)" (Japanese: 魔のアクロバット族（後編）)	11 June 1967
By a miracle Speed has survived, but has suffered a concussion and hysterical blindness. His determination to win the race against literally all odds touches Racer X to the point that he deliberately fakes injury to help navigate Speed to safety – and to warn Oiler when a leakage of oil from his car leads to a near-fatal explosion short of the finish.
12	"Marengo's Revenge (Part 1)" / "Race for Revenge: Part 1"; Transliteration: "Marengo no Fukushū (Zenpen)" (Japanese: マレンゴの復讐（前編）)	18 June 1967
During a test session, Speed is overtaken by a mysterious car numbered X3, whose distinctive engine hum is familiar to a vicious gang of racers known as the Three Roses Club, because the engine is from a car whose driver they killed years earlier in a mountain race. When the mysterious driver turns out to be a robot who repeats a prerecorded warning, "Melange still races", it turns out to be the work of Flash Marker Jr., the son of the deceased racer who has vowed to destroy the Three Roses Club at the same mountain course where his father was killed.
13	"Marengo's Revenge (Part 2)" / "Race for Revenge: Part 2"; Transliteration: "Marengo no Fukushū (Kōhen)" (Japanese: マレンゴの復讐（後編）)	25 June 1967
Lilly, the sister of the vengeful Flash Marker Jr., is dragooned into driving the rebuilt Melange to destroy the present members of the Three Roses Club, but disaster strikes when Speed thwarts Marker's plan for vengeance.
14	"The Desert Race of Death (Part 1)" / "The Desperate Desert Race: Part 1"; Transliteration: "Shi no Sabaku Rēsu (Zenpen)" (Japanese: 死の砂漠レース（前編）)	2 July 1967
Speed and another racer, Kim Jugger, are airlifted, along with their cars, to Flat Hill Country for a desert race. When a mysterious time-bomb destroys Kim's race car, the Black Tiger, after it is unloaded from the plane, Spritle is blamed. However, Spritle, while hiding, witnessed the saboteur. Now, Speed must convince Kim, who are sworn enemies to each other, that Spritle is innocent. After surviving a sandstorm, Speed, Trixie, Spritle, and Chim Chim are apprehended in the desert by the Flat Hill Rebel Army riding camels that are faster than normal and are taken to their headquarters where Kim is part of their group alongside his father General Ali Gallant. The Flat Hill Rebel Army start to use flamethrowers on the Mach-5 under the orders of Kim's uncle Ali Ben Schemer who Spritle identified as the real culprit.
15	"The Desert Race of Death (Part 2)" / "The Desperate Desert Race: Part 2"; Transliteration: "Shi no Sabaku Rēsu (Kōhen)" (Japanese: 死の砂漠レース（後編）)	9 July 1967
After Speed attacks one of the rebels that was trying to torch the Mach-5, Kim learns that the Black Tiger was actually blown up by Schemer under Gallant's order to ensure he would stay with the army and not enter the desert race. Kim and Gallant believe the Flat Hill government is corrupt and that their rebel cause is just. To determine who is the better racer, Speed and Kim decide to race each other without the use of brakes since the Black Tiger's brakes are still broken. While they are out racing, members of the Rebel Army led by Schemer kidnap Trixie and lock her up in their dungeon where they are also holding Prince Omar. We learn that it was all a hoax and that Schemer's intention was to rule Flat Hill Country for their own selfish purposes. We also learn that they planted a scorpion in Speed and Kim's cars to get rid of them permanently. Speed and Kim's race was rendered incomplete when the Black Tiger gets caught in quicksand. The government of Flat Hill Country led by General Abdul Noble comes to the aid of Kim and Speed after they previously rescued Spritle and Chim Chim. The two of them have discovered the trick and decide to join forces to fight Schemer's forces and rescue Trixie and Prince Omar. In the end, they succeed and Speed alone enters the Desert Race, easily winning, with Kim on the sidelines cheering.
16	"The Underground Inca Race (Part 1)" / "The Fire Race: Part 1"; Transliteration: "Inka Chitei Rēsu (Zenpen)" (Japanese: インカ地底レース（前編）)	16 July 1967
At a meeting of the League of Countries, Chief Zuma, the representative from Kapedapek, announces his government's decision to close its borders to the outside world. An official proposes that if Kapedapek's race car driver, named Kabala, beats Speed Racer, then its borders can remain closed. At the racetrack, Speed receives an invitation to the Fire Festival Race. Speed finds this peculiar because Kapedapek does not have a racetrack and Kabala has been missing for a long time. Nevertheless, Speed and company arrive in Kapedapek. They spot Racer X, who was also invited. That night Chief Zuma lets it be known that "the winner of the race will be bridegroom" to his granddaughter, Princess Silvana. He points out Speed as the probable winner. But when a jealous Trixie makes it clear that Speed is taken, another driver, Mr. Kadar, steps forward with his offer of matrimony. Later, Mr. Kadar captures the Princess and demands to know where the country's treasure is hidden. Speed comes to her rescue. The next day, the racers and their cars are carried by raft to a secret entrance in a volcanic mountain. The racers drive through a tunnel to an ancient city with bejeweled statues. The race is set to begin once the volcano erupts. An official announces that the cars will drive through 800 miles of volcanic tunnel. Whoever reaches the exit before the split in the mountain closes will win the race. Amid falling debris, an unsteady terrain, and the threat of impending molten lava, the drivers line up. Kabala shows up and the race begins.
17	"The Underground Inca Race (Part 2)" / "The Fire Race: Part 2"; Transliteration: "Inka Chitei Rēsu (Kōhen)" (Japanese: インカ地底レース（後編）)	23 July 1967
In the volcanic mountains of Kapedapek, Speed is competing in the most unusual race of his life. Kadar and his men find diamonds encrusted in the mountain wall. A creeping vine grabs his men (who escape), while Kadar holds Kabala at gunpoint. Speed throws a knife, knocking the gun out of Kadar's hand. A fight ensues and Kabala's mask falls off, revealing Racer X. Racer X is about to give Speed an explanation when the ground caves in. Kadar and his thugs leave with the Kapedapekan treasure. Speed and Racer X find a way out. Racer X tells Speed that the real Kabala taught him "tricks on how to race on tortured roads and broken trails." Once Racer X turned professional, he had a race with his mentor, who, unfortunately, fell victim to a landslide. To return Kabala's kindness, Racer X disguised himself as Kabala to protect the Kapedapekan treasure. Kadar and his men succumb to the lava flow. Speed, followed by Racer X, exits the mountain just as it erupts and seals the split. Although Speed won the race, the Chief will not concede. Speed points out that Kabala is really Racer X, who suggests that Kapedapek keep its borders open "some of the time". The Chief agrees to do so.
18	"The Secret Treasure of Niagara (Part 1)" / "Girl Daredevil: Part 1"; Transliteration: "Naiagara no Hihō (Zenpen)" (Japanese: ナイアガラの秘宝（前編）)	30 July 1967
At the base of a tall building, Speed and company watch Twinkle Banks, star of the Universal Circus, dive off the top and land deftly in a net. Then, at the circus, they watch Twinkle drive a race car and perform daredevil stunts. She worries about maintaining the car's momentum and faints. Speed rescues Twinkle. While the girl daredevil rests in bed, a clown (her father) tells Speed that because of a money shortage, he is having difficulty keeping the track in good repair. Speed makes a donation. Later, Speed and Trixie learn on the radio that Twinkle will drive a car, balanced on two ropes, over Niagara Falls. Because of the strong winds, Speed and Trixie try to stop Twinkle. Meanwhile, Cornpone Brush, who financed the stunt, tells the clown that Twinkle will perform regardless of the hazardous weather. When Speed and Trixie arrive, Twinkle is already making her way across the falls. Away from the crowd, Brush reads an old map. It identifies a secret cave in back of the falls that leads to a treasure. His thugs lower a gigantic pipeline into the falls and Brush drives into it to discover the cave's entrance. Back at the stunt show, the wind causes Twinkle's car to plunge into the falls, leaving her hanging onto one of the ropes. Speed drives the Mach 5 on two wheels down the remaining rope to rescuer Twinkle. He grabs her. The rope snaps and they plunge into the falls. Attempting to drive along the bottom, Speed gets caught in a series of whirlpools. With little oxygen left in the cockpit, Speed and Twinkle pass out.
19	"The Secret Treasure of Niagara (Part 2)" / "Girl Daredevil: Part 2"; Transliteration: "Naiagara no Hihō (Kōhen)" (Japanese: ナイアガラの秘宝（後編）)	6 August 1967
After falling in to the river, Speed and Twinkle awake back into consciousness. Speed remembers a hidden cave behind the falls. They enter the cave behind the falls. Cornpone Brotch (identified as Cornpone Brush in the previous episode) and his thugs arrive with the treasure. Speed fights off the thugs, while Brotch escapes in the Mach 5. Using her experience as an escape artist, Twinkle frees herself and Speed from the ropes that bind them. Trixie, in her helicopter, along with Spritle and Chim Chim, spots Brotch in the Mach 5. Speed and Twinkle exit the cave; Trixie picks them up. Brotch enters his secret hideout located in Mount Rushmore. Later that night, Speed and the gang find the secret entrance. Inside the mountain, Speed and company find collections of stolen art and cars, including the Mach 5. Brotch surrounds them with ferocious black panthers. While Speed fights the cats, Twinkle jumps to safety, hanging from a chandelier. Meanwhile, Trixie races in the Mach 5 to save her friends. Brotch locks them all in the room. Sleeping gas seeps through vents in the wall and the panthers pass out. Speed and company are protected by the Mach 5's deflector shield. With a handkerchief over his face, Speed jumps out of his car and opens the door. Spritle and Chim Chim feed the panthers candy; the cats attack the thugs. Finally, Speed, Trixie and Twinkle escape. They enter a room where a lion sits in a cage, connected to another with Twinkle's father inside. Brotch tells them to step back or he will let the lion into the clown's cage. Twinkle reminds her father that he used to be the best animal trainer in the world. The clown stares down the lion. Riding atop the panthers, Spritle and Chim Chim come to the rescue. Later, at Niagara Falls, Twinkle performs her trick again. This time, the clown accompanies her in the vehicle. The clown is Speed in disguise.
20	"The Demonic Race Car (Part 1)" / "The Fastest Car on Earth: Part 1"; Transliteration: "Akuma no Rēsu Kā (Zenpen)" (Japanese: 悪魔のレースカー（前編）)	13 August 1967
A woman named Oriana Flub and her henchmen uncover a powerful and dangerous high speed engine called the GRX in order to ensure that they win the Oriental Grand Prix. When they test it on the track, Pops recognizes the sound of the engine and warns Speed not to go near it. Out of suspicion, Pops takes Spritle and Chim-Chim to the cemetery where the engine was buried. They go to Oriana's house afterwards, where Pops demands the engine so he can destroy it like he should have done 10 years ago when it was first built. Speed decides that he wants to learn more about the car so he can find a way to beat it in the race, and ends up driving it. The high speed is thrilling to him at first, but he is overpowered by the stresses and falls unconscious while driving.
21	"The Demonic Race Car (Part 2)" / "The Fastest Car on Earth: Part 2"; Transliteration: "Akuma no Rēsu Kā (Kōhen)" (Japanese: 悪魔のレースカー（後編）)	20 August 1967
Pops, Spritle and Chim-Chim manage to catch up to the car with the GRX's engine and, thanks to Chim-Chim, stop it before it crashes into the ocean. After getting into a fight with Oriana's henchmen, Pops takes Speed home. Speed later wakes up, and after Pops splashes water in his face, is back to normal. During the trial, Oriana and her henchmen spray the driver of the GRX with a special gas in order to make him able to tolerate the high velocity. However, while he is driving, he drinks water out of desperation and ends up wrecking the GRX. Since the old driver is unable to race, Oriana persuades Speed to drive the GRX. They repair it, and spray Speed with the special gas so he can take it out for a test run. During the practice, Pops, Trixie and Spritle find him and take him away, despite his protests. On the drive home, Trixie lets him have water, which makes him terrified of going fast at all. Pops helps him to overcome his fears, and he finally gets over it during the big race.
22	"The Mach 5, a Hair's Breadth from Danger (Part 1)" / "Mach 5 vs. Mach 5: Part 1"; Transliteration: "Mahha Gō Kiki Ippatsu (Zenpen)" (Japanese: マッハ号危機一髪（前編）)	27 August 1967
Plans for a device called the Mizmo Beam are stolen from the National Science Institute by someone driving the Mach 5. When the police ask Speed where he was on the night of the robbery, he says he was at the residence of a girl named Lorena and her father Dr. Nightcall. But when Lorena and her father claim to have no idea who Speed is, Speed is placed under arrest for the robbery. Lorena and Dr. Nightcall are secretly working for the evil Cumulus, who orders Nightcall to build a duplicate of the Mach 5. Spritle reveals to Trixie that he and Chim Chim were hiding in the Mach 5's trunk when Speed went to Lorena's house, corroborating his story. Speed's coffee was drugged to make him fall asleep, Dr. Nightcall stole the Mach 5 to commit the Science Institute robbery, and Speed was set up to take the blame. Trixie relays it to Inspector Detector, and the policemen go to question Dr. Nightcall, but he and Lorena escape. As Speed pursues them in the Mach 5, Cumulus appears in the duplicate Mach 5 that Nightcall built. The duplicate Mach 5 not only has the same gadgets as the original, but it can also fly and is equipped with the Mizmo Beam, which fires destructive blasts of intense heat.
23	"The Mach 5, a Hair's Breadth from Danger (Part 2)" / "Mach 5 vs. Mach 5: Part 2"; Transliteration: "Mahha Gō Kiki Ippatsu (Kōhen)" (Japanese: マッハ号危機一髪（後編）)	3 September 1967
After managing to destroy the Mizmo Beam, Speed pursues Cumulus and his fake Mach 5 to his underwater base, but Speed and Trixie end up captured. With the help of Dr. Nightcall, Cumulus plans to destroy all the military bases in the world with intercontinental ballistic missiles. Unaware of her father's true intentions and having a crisis of conscience, Lorena attempts to stop Cumulus by shooting him with her father's gun, but Cumulus shoots and kills her. Spritle and Chim Chim sneak into the base dressed as one of Cumulus' guards, stop the missile launch, and save Speed and Trixie. As Cumulus escapes in the duplicate Mach 5, he tells Speed not to follow him or else he will set off the nuclear bomb built into his car and destroy the city. The repentant Dr. Nightcall explains that the bomb is heavy, making the duplicate Mach 5 slow enough for the real Mach 5 to catch up to it. In addition, Spritle and Chim Chim, having been hiding in the duplicate Mach 5's trunk, emerge to throw off Cumulus' driving. It allows Speed to jump into Cumulus' car and toss him into the road, where he is promptly detained by the policemen. Dr. Nightcall plans to convert Cumulus' base into a laboratory for undersea research and developing resources for the ocean, dedicated to his daughter's memory.
24	"The Junior Grand Prix (Part 1)" / "The Royal Racer: Part 1"; Transliteration: "Chibikko Guran Puri (Zenpen)" (Japanese: チビッコ・グランプリ（前編）)	10 September 1967
A race for 8- to 13-year-olds involves a young prince, Prince Jam, who bears a striking resemblance to Spritle. Spritle complains about not being allowed in the race, but Pops reminds him that he will not turn 8 until two days after the race. In escaping from a kidnap plot to put Prince Sugarin on the throne, Prince Jam and Spritle collide with each other and are mistaken for each other. During the race, the plotters try to take out "Prince Jam".
25	"The Junior Grand Prix (Part 2)" / "The Royal Racer: Part 2"; Transliteration: "Chibikko Guran Puri (Kōhen)" (Japanese: チビッコ・グランプリ（後編）)	17 September 1967
Spritle and Prince Jam thwart the plotters and the prince is crowned. Spritle also learns he can legally enter the race because they crossed the International Date Line, making it one day later than they thought it was.
26	"Stop the Speeders!" / "The Car Hater"; Transliteration: "Supīdo wo Kese!" (Japanese: スピードを消せ!)	24 September 1967
Janine Trotter is a young woman who is a fan of Speed, much to the consternation of the possessive Trixie. Janine is punished by her wealthy father, who hates cars because his son was killed by one. Mr. Trotter sabotages the opening of a new speedway and also causes mammoth traffic jams in the nearby city. When Mr. Trotter pays three third-rate hoods to sabotage Mr. Racer's shop, they are overpowered by Speed and Sparky; they then learn that Janine and Trixie are testing a new car - whose brakes were sabotaged by one of the man's paid hoodlums.
27	"Cleopatra's Curse (Part 1)" / "The Race Against Time: Episode 1"; Transliteration: "Noroi no Kureopatora (Zenpen)" (Japanese: 呪いのクレオパトラ（前編）)	1 October 1967
In Egypt, Speed Racer meets a scientist named Digger O. Bone who asks him with his dying breath to take care of his daughter Calcia. Unfortunately for Speed, Calcia has hit her head and thinks she is Cleopatra. Under the evil influence of Splint Femur, Calcia has kidnapped Trixie, threatening her with death. Speed must pass a series of tests, including a gladiator fight with lions and guards and retrieving a statue from the top of a pyramid while racing against the clock to save Trixie.
28	"Cleopatra's Curse (Part 2)" / "The Race Against Time: Episode 2"; Transliteration: "Noroi no Kureopatora (Kōhen)" (Japanese: 呪いのクレオパトラ（後編）)	8 October 1967
Speed saves Trixie in time, but are made slaves and ordered to dig up the treasure. While escaping, Speed is captured and driven into the Nile in the Mach 5. He survives and returns with the policemen to rescue Trixie and battle a giant stone robot. As Splint Femur tries to escape with the gold on a plane. Speed and Calcia, who regain her memories, stowaway on the plane to stop Splint Femur.
29	"The Arm of Gold" / "The Snake Track"; Transliteration: "Kogane no Ude" (Japanese: 黄金の腕)	15 October 1967
Speed is training for the Super Car Race on the Snake Track which is a new course that has seven curves. After a day of training, Speed meets Rock Force, who outmaneuvers some gangsters by driving his car on two wheels. While talking to Rock Force, Speed notices that the car has a special automatic transmission. After the gangsters wreck his car, Mr. Force comes to Mr. Racer to have it fixed. Speed and Mr. Force get into a fight and Mr. Force reveals that he cannot use his right arm and wears a metal brace on it. Mr. Force tells how he accepted money to throw a race, but won it anyway. The gangsters then crippled his right arm to prevent him from racing and have now wrecked his car. While Mr. Racer fixes the car, Speed challenges him to drive the Mach 5 with its manual transmission to help "wake up" his right arm. The next day Mr. Force wins the Snake Track race, but the gangsters come forward and reveal that he cannot use his right arm. Mr. Force proceeds to punch out the gangsters and Speed grabs his arm. They then both realize that he punched out the men with his right arm; his arm has completely healed. The racing official then chastises the gangsters for lying to him. Speed then tells his friend Rock that he will beat him the next time they meet.
30	"The Showdown by the Dam" / "The Man on the Lam"; Transliteration: "Damu Saido no Taiketsu" (Japanese: ダムサイドの対決)	22 October 1967
Lawson Lamster, a fugitive from prison, sees his young daughter stricken with blindness and who does not know her father; she takes kindly to the mysterious man who is interested in her, unaware of who he really is. The fugitive robbed a bank years ago and is running from the gangsters who worked with him; Lamster takes Speed at gunpoint to find the money he has hidden, but they are seized by Stencher, Lamster's former partner, and his men. Speed and Lamster escape and a fatal gun battle and fire erupts, defeating Stencher and his men, but leaving Lamster stricken; his dying wish is that an operation be performed to give his daughter his eyes.
31	"Lightning-Quick Ninja Cars (Part 1)" / "Gang of Assassins: Part 1"; Transliteration: "Hayate! Ninja Kā (Zenpen)" (Japanese: 疾風!忍者カー（前編）)	29 October 1967
While sightseeing in Japan, members of the Mach 5 team cross paths with a gang of assassins who are out to sabotage an international peace conference by kidnapping international diplomats from the peace conference, hoping to start a war. Racer X joins the assassins.
32	"Lightning-Quick Ninja Cars (Part 2)" / "Gang of Assassins: Part 2"; Transliteration: "Hayate! Ninja Kā (Kōhen)" (Japanese: 疾風!忍者カー（後編）)	5 November 1967
Speed learns that Racer X has joined the assassins, but the assassins' plans are thwarted when Racer X double-crosses them to help Speed to escape and destroy the assassins' dragon-shaped airship/submarine.
33	"The Tempestuous Showdown" / "The Race for Life"; Transliteration: "Arashi no Kettō" (Japanese: 嵐の決闘)	12 November 1967
Speed is in Mexico and must obtain a serum to save the life of the mayor of a village that is in danger of falling into the hands of the man who poisoned him.
34	"Record-Breaker Rampage" / "The Supersonic Car"; Transliteration: "Bōsō! Rekōdo Kā" (Japanese: 暴走!レコードカー)	19 November 1967
Vavoom Motor Co. is trying to build a supersonic car, which Speed is testing. Agents from Forthebird Motor Co. sabotage the car and blame Speed for the accident. They demand a new test driver, but Speed enters their driving tests, and proves again that he is the best driver. Agents from Forthebird Motors put a bomb on the finish line to destroy the car, but Spritle overhears them and warns Speed. Speed goes on and breaks the speed record before the bomb goes off.
35	"Jungle Monster Tank: Part 1" / "Crash in the Jungle: Part 1"; Transliteration: "Mitsurin no Kai Sensha (Zenpen)" (Japanese: 密林の怪戦車（前編）)	26 November 1967
Speed heads to Nairobi for the Trans-African Grand Prix, after his plane crashes, he is dumped into the jungle and stranded on an island where the exiled General Smasher, a ruthless dictator who is creating giant monsters. Speed must fend for himself amidst giant spiders and gargantuan gorillas and becomes essentially a "jungle boy" (complete with swinging on vines and his clothes ripped to shreds) trying to stop General Smasher.
36	"Jungle Monster Tank: Part 2" / "Crash in the Jungle: Part 2"; Transliteration: "Mitsurin no Kai Sensha (Kōhen)" (Japanese: 密林の怪戦車（後編）)	3 December 1967
Speed, Trixie, Spritle and Chim-Chim are captured by General Smasher's jungle soldiers, who plan to take over the world.
37	"The Mad Human Calculator" / "The Terrifying Gambler"; Transliteration: "Jigoku no Keisan Ma" (Japanese: 地獄の計算魔)	10 December 1967
A criminal hijacks the Mach 5 during the Monte Carlo Rally. Speed later identifies the man, who is a famous gambler named Mr. Fastbucks, but cannot prove it. When he confronts Mr. Fastbucks, Speed is told his master plan: Mr. Fastbucks has bought up coal and train companies and by blowing up the world's gas supplies, he will become fabulously rich. Instead, it is Mr. Fastbucks who gets blown up.
38	"Secret Agent No. 9: Part 1" / "The Secret Invaders: Part 1"; Transliteration: "Himitsu Jōhō-in Nanbā Nain (Zenpen)" (Japanese: 秘密情報員NO.9（前編）)	17 December 1967
An assassin is foiled while trying to kill Princess Gracious of Ambrocia. The assassins know that some racer flashed his mirror, blinding the assassin. It was actually Racer X, but they assume it was Speed and try to take him out with a bomb plated in the Mach 5. After being warned about it from Spritle, Speed is able to defuse the bomb in time and discovers a plot to blow up the President's speech by the assassins. Speed rushes to save the President's life but the bomb goes off.
39	"Secret Agent No. 9: Part 2" / "The Secret Invaders: Part 2"; Transliteration: "Himitsu Jōhō-in Nanbā Nain (Kōhen)" (Japanese: 秘密情報員NO.9（後編）)	24 December 1967
After Speed saves President Montebank from being blown up by the assassins, a few days later, Speed is invited to the vice-president's house where the assassins knock out Speed. One of them uses a Speed Racer face mask (just like Mission Impossible) to take Speed to a remote location and push him and the Mach 5 over a cliff. After Speed fakes his own death, the assassins try to take out President Montebank again, but Speed and Racer X defeat the assassins.
40	"The Terrifying Bomb Car" / "The Man Behind the Mask"; Transliteration: "Kyōfu no Bakudan Kā" (Japanese: 恐怖の爆弾カー)	7 January 1968
Speed is scheduled to compete in the North American Grand Prix and rides on the same plane as Dr. Fantasty. At the same time, Spritle and Chim Chim have stowed away to see Speed's race. While Speed and Trixie are learning of Dr. Fantasty's rocket fuel engine, the plane they are on is hijacked by strange masked men who direct the plane to an uncharted island. Once there, Speed, Trixie, Spritle, Chim Chim, and Dr. Fantasty meet the masked men's masked leader Mark Meglaton, who plans to force Speed and Dr. Fantasty to help steal art from around the world, followed by a plot for world domination by launching missiles at the Earth's major cities. It is up to Mr. Racer and Racer X to come to the rescue and help to defeat Mark Meglaton. With their help, they defeat Mark Meglaton and discover that he is actually the unnamed best friend of Dr. Fantasty.
41	"The Phantom Castle of Steel" / "The Car Destroyer"; Transliteration: "Tetsu no Maboroshi-jō" (Japanese: 鉄のまぼろし城)	14 January 1968
A man uses small cars which allow him to control real cars that he then melts down and uses to build a metal forest complete with robotic animals. He is destroying cars because his son was crippled by a hit and run driver, but it is revealed that his son can really walk and was kept in the wheelchair by his father.
42	"The Pineapple Race" / "The Desperate Racer"; Transliteration: "Painappuru Rēsu" (Japanese: パイナップル・レース)	21 January 1968
In South America, Speed has entered the Pineapple Grand Prix, where each driver has to carry a pineapple in his car. Someone has hidden a diamond in one of the pineapples, so the criminals are stealing the fruits from the drivers.
43	"Witch Number Zero" / "The Dangerous Witness"; Transliteration: "Majo Nanbā Zero" (Japanese: 魔女ナンバー・0)	28 January 1968
In Hong Kong, after witnessing two murders, Speed is asked by Princess Pedal to be her bodyguard, as the women assassins are under orders to wipe her and Speed out.
44	"Killer Car, Mark V2" / "Race the Laser Tank"; Transliteration: "Satsujin Kā Bī Tsū-gō" (Japanese: 殺人カー・V2号)	4 February 1968
In Hawaii, the crooks have captured top-secret plans for a new weapon: a tank with a laser device. When Speed tries to interfere, they decide to test the tank on him.
45	"Car Wrestler X" / "The Great Car Wrestling Match"; Transliteration: "Kā Resurā Ekkusu" (Japanese: カーレスラーX)	11 February 1968
Speed discovers that a former racing driver Gadge Zoomer has taken to car wrestling (demolition derbies) to support his fellow family members. Speed enters the Mach 5 in a demolition derby to convince him to leave this destructive sport.
46	"Apache Bikers Attack" / "Motorcycle Apaches"; Transliteration: "Ōto Apatchi no Shūgeki" (Japanese: オート・アパッチの襲撃)	18 February 1968
In the American West, a convoy of trucks is crossing the desert. A group of motorcycles scream down the mountainside and attack the convoy. Meanwhile, Speed wins the Southwest Grand Prix. One of Speed's fans is admiring the Mach Five when Speed walks into the garage. He says that he wants to be a professional racer himself, but does not make it. He does not give his name. That evening, Speed and his best friends are dining with Mr. Skyhigh from the Office of Space Development. Later, in a ghost town, Skyhigh is trying to enlist Speed's help to protect the construction of an international space development base. The crews and equipment are being attacked by motorcycle Apaches. The Mach 5 is needed to transport a shipment of uraniumtane, an element that will give nuclear missiles an explosive power greater than an H-bomb.
47	"The Monster Car Rises Again" / "Car with a Brain"; Transliteration: "Monsutā Kā no Fukkatsu" (Japanese: モンスターカーの復活)	25 February 1968
One stormy night in the Bonny Hills of Scotland, Dr. McFife, a mad scientist, has secretly developed a Monster Car that is controlled by an electronic brain. Dr. McFife sends it out to wreak havoc on the countryside. The Monster Car plows through everything in its way, smashing through a village, past a police car, destroying the Bonnie racetrack, and shaking up the city where the Racers, Sparky, and Trixie are staying at their hotel. Not wanting anything bad to happen to the Mach 5 during the incident, Speed dashes off to the parking lot to reach his vehicle. As he prepares to get the Mach 5 out of the parking lot, he witnesses the Monster Car destroy the place. Speed then goes off in pursuit, before being blown away by one of the gigantic vehicle's rocket thrusters, leaving him unconscious and the Mach 5 on its side. The Monster Car then destroys an entire tank battalion that has attempted to destroy it, to no avail. On the radio, the race has been called off. While out searching for Speed, Pops and Sparky find him and put the Mach 5 back on its wheels. The policemen then ask Mr. Racer for his help to defeat the Monster Car. The Policemen have arrested Dr. McFife but he refuses to help them, as the Monster Car destroys even more tanks. Speed and Mr. Racer come up with a plan to attack the Monster Car while it is in the water. Jets and submarines are unable to stop it, Speed finds a way inside the Monster Car. Speed uses a brain rattler to scramble the brain of the Monster Car and is able to destroy it.
48	"The Fixer-Upper Grand Prix" / "The Junk Car Grand Prix" "The Junk Yard Grand Prix"; Transliteration: "Ponkotsu Kā Guran Puri" (Japanese: ポンコツカー・グランプリ)	3 March 1968 (Japan)
A rich man named Baron von Vondervon is giving a race for 17-year-old girls in memory of his daughter Ivonna, who disappeared when she was 5 years old; the winner of the race will be treated as his daughter. A greedy man named Mr. Freeloader enlists the aid of a driver named Lolly. After trying to pass himself as a woman during the race, Mr. Freeloader discovers that one of the other drivers is Ivonna and kidnaps her. After Speed saves Ivonna, Trixie and Ivonna finish the race with Trixie first and Ivonna second. Ivonna and her father are reunited.
49	"The Last-Ditch Balloon Escape" / "The Car in the Sky"; Transliteration: "Kesshi no Fūsen Dasshutsu" (Japanese: 決死の風船脱出)	10 March 1968 (Japan), 1 March 1968 (North America)
Speed and his fellow family members are on the way to the Grand Prix (which is the key race for the World Racing Championship) and their plane is forced down on to an island by a storm. On the island they find out: that both the plane's and the Mach 5's radios have been smashed; every other passenger is in a hurry to get where they are going; there are no plants or food on the island, and that the island is likely a forgotten top secret base used during World War II. Since the island is uncharted, Speed has no idea where to send the homing robot nor if the oxygen would last long enough to get help. Speed comes up with an idea to use the Mach 5 as an aerial vehicle fitted with mammoth balloons to get help for the survivors of the plane crash. They decide to draw lots to see who will be going, Speed wins one of the lots, Trixie wins the next one but gives hers to a girl named Susie, who wants to see her sick grandmother, the last one is bought by a greedy man named Mr. Bullion, who has a business meeting to get to. Speeds finds out that Spritle and Chim Chim have stowed away in the Mach 5's trunk again. While lighting the load in the Mach 5, Speed throws out Mr. Bullion's gold bars into the water. Mr. Bullion then steals one of the balloons, but the balloon hits a mountain and it explodes, killing him. Speed, Susie, Spritle and Chim Chim make their way to land just in time for Susie to see her grandmother and the race is delayed until the other survivors are rescued.
50	"The Acrobat Clan's Counterattack" / "The Trick Race"; Transliteration: "Akurobatto-zoku no Gyakushū" (Japanese: アクロバット族の逆襲)	17 March 1968 (Fuji Television), Japan); March 8th, 1968 (United States)
International criminals trick Speed Racer and the Car Acrobats (though seen a few times during flashbacks, the Car Acrobats are minus Snake Oiler, either dead or still injured as a result of his crash in "The Most Dangerous Race") into a dangerous grudge race; in order to destroy them and also smoke out Racer X, a.k.a. Secret Agent 9. The criminals attack Racer X and reveal themselves to be behind many of the clandestine actions seen in previous episodes. Racer X barely escapes an assassination attempt and warns Speed and the Car Acrobats, that whose vehicles have been rigged with explosives. The Car Acrobats turn the tables on the gang, while Speed gets a surprising reaction when he finally inquires as to Racer X's true identity. Note: The Acrobat Clan's Counterattack (also known as The Trick Race) is a sequel to "The Most Dangerous Race." It also follows up on the events of "Gang of Assassins," "The Secret Invaders," and "The Dangerous Witness."
51	"The Biggest Race in History: Part 1" / "The Race Around the World: Part 1"; Transliteration: "Shijō Saidai no Rēsu (Zenpen)" (Japanese: 史上最大のレース（前編）)	24 March 1968 (Fuji Television, Japan), March 15th, 1968 (United States)
A billionaire, Mr. Karat Goldminter, sanctions the Around the World Grand Prix, a racing competition involving open wheel race cars, rocket boats, airplanes, submarines, snowmobiles, and finally the preferred race cars of each entrant; the race begins in Los Angeles and ends in Tokyo. Mr. Goldminter is offering a large amount of gold and marriage to his daughter Lovelace to whoever wins the race. Lovelace and her guardian Oscar enter the race to teach her father a lesson because she does not want to be married. Speed and Sparky are in the thick of things, when Team 4 cheats to win, including having spikes come out from their hubs. Lovelace wrecks her boat on the first water leg and Speed saves her from sharks. In the air, Team 4 uses both a blade and a long cable to knock several planes including Speed's out of the sky.
52	"The Biggest Race in History: Part 2" / "The Race Around the World: Part 2"; Transliteration: "Shijō Saidai no Rēsu (Kōhen)" (Japanese: 史上最大のレース（後編）)	31 March 1968 (Fuji Television, Japan); March 15th, 1968 (United States)
Speed and Sparky survive the crash and quickly catch up to the other racers. In the Sahara Desert, a windstorm buries the racers in the sand. On the last leg of the race, when Lovelace runs out of gas she is aided with extra fuel by Speed, but he runs out of gas himself. When Racer X appears and gives Speed a lecture about his duty to win as a professional racer vs. his desire to help his competitors, Speed blows up at himself - but then Sparky notices a conveniently-left-behind tank of gas by Racer X. Thus refueled, Speed and Sparky race into contention for the win, Speed wins the Around the World Grand Prix, becoming a World Champion Racer and Lovelace reveals herself to her father and tells him that she does not want to be married. Speed vows there are other races to be won as he and Sparky race on.
