= The New Adventures of Speed Racer =

- Based on: Speed Racer by Tatsuo Yoshida
- Developed by: David Wise
- Directed by: Bill Wolf
- Voices of: Michael Gough; Thom Pinto; Susan Blu; Jeannie Elias; Tony Pope; Jim Cummings
- Music by: Dennis C. Brown; Maxine Sellers; Larry Brown
- Country of origin: United States
- Original language: English
- No. of seasons: 1
- No. of episodes: 13

Production
- Executive producer: Fred Wolf
- Producer: Michael Algar
- Production companies: Speed Racer Enterprises; Fred Wolf Films

Original release
- Network: First-run syndication
- Release: September 18 – December 11, 1993

The New Adventures of Speed Racer is a 1993 update of the Speed Racer animated series. This new Americanized version was designed as a single 13-episode season (the first episode was entitled "The Mach 5's First Trial"), with the intent of launching a feature film adaptation.

Issues with Warner Bros. having the live action rights (which resulted in the 2008 release) forestalled negotiations and investments for the film and the series ended accordingly, though it did provide a massive merchandising reboot for the intellectual property, which found a resurgence thanks to a major toy line. The series concept was born out of a pitch from Pangea to then property-owners, John and James Rocknowski of Speed Racer Enterprises, Inc. Fred Wolf of Fred Wolf Films, had also pitched the notion of rebooting the franchise. PANGEA, having worked developmentally with Playmates Toys in association with Fred Wolf Films on the Teenage Mutant Ninja Turtles, worked with Speed Racer Enterprises on the series development, including the merchandising, which included a toy line from Ace Novelty Toys, comic books by NOW Comics, and novelties by NJ Croce. The series also proved to be popular with the Russian audience. A new theme song was written.

The "New Adventures" part of the title comes from official documents used for TV listings. The show itself is referred to onscreen as simply "Speed Racer". Coincidentally, Speed Racer X is known in Brazil as "As Novas Aventuras de Speed Racer", which literally translates into "The New Adventures of Speed Racer".

== Cast ==
- Michael Gough as Speed Racer, Foreman
- Thom Pinto as Sparky, Racer X
- Susan Blu as Sprytle
- Jeannie Elias as Trixie, Chim-Chim
- Tony Pope as Pops Racer
- Jim Cummings as Caligula P. Barnum

== Episodes ==
No.	Title	Written by	Original release date
1	"The Mach-5's First Trial"	David Wise	September 18, 1993
When Speed takes the brand new Mach 5 out for a joyride he crashes it and it gets stolen by Dr. Norbius.
2	"The Pleasantville Terror"	David Wise	September 25, 1993
While transporting a new superfuel, Speed and the others find themselves in the strange town of Pleasantville.
3	"The Race Against X"	David Wise	October 2, 1993
Speed enters the Trans-Europa 9000 and competes against Racer X, who is wrecking other cars.
4	"B.O.S.S."	David Wise	October 9, 1993
With Pops away at a conference, Mach Research's main computer goes down and is replaced with the B.O.S.S.
5	"Creature From the Sombra Lagoon"	David Wise	October 16, 1993
Speed searches for a missing doctor in the Amazon Jungle.
6	"Trouble in Deep Twelve"	David Wise	October 23, 1993
Speed travels to the Deep Twelve Underwater Research Station and investigates missing subs and strange earthquakes.
7	"The Mach 5 Is Missing"	David Wise	October 30, 1993
After a race, the Mach 5 is stolen and used to commit various crimes, apparently driven by Pops.
8	"Race to the Future"	David Wise	November 6, 1993
Speed is kidnapped by mutants, taken to the future in the year 2078, and made to compete in the Battle Races of Caligula P. Barnum.
9	"Escape from the Past"	Bryce Malek	November 13, 1993
An accident with a time machine sends Speed and Racer X millions of years into the past.
10	"Samurai Racers"	David Wise	November 20, 1993
A group of samurai-inspired criminals attack a race and kidnap Pops so he can perfect the formula for a new concentrated fuel.
11	"Dawn of the Mutants"	David Wise	November 27, 1993
Caligula P. Barnum sends his associates into the past to help Largo Sludge create the toxic waste that would lead to the creation of mutants in the future.
12	"Return to the Future"	David Wise	December 4, 1993
Caligula P. Barnum has Sparky kidnapped to build new vehicles for the Battle Races.
13	"Attack from the Future"	David Wise	December 11, 1993
Mutants travel through time and invade the present, transporting an entire city into the future for Caligula P. Barnum to rule over.
