= Nissan Saurus Jr. =

Race car version of Nissan Saurus

The Nissan Saurus Jr. was first sold in 1991. It is a race car version of the Nissan Saurus.

The Saurus Jr. was designed by Nissan solely for the one-make series known as the Saurus Jr. Cup, which was held at the Tsukuba circuit. It was available as a kit (2.3 million yen) or a finished vehicle (2.7 million yen).

== Options ==
Available options for the Saurus were a mirror, and a rear spoiler. Tire and wheel specifications options were also available.

== Mechanical ==
The Saurus was powered by an SOHC 4-cylinder MA10E producing 70 ps @ 5600 RPM sending power to a 5-speed manual gearbox. The gearbox is a transaxle RS5F31V. Except a part, the almost basically same as a gearbox of March R.

As for suspension, it had front/rear wishbone suspension connected to 175/60R14 tires and a rack & pinion steering box.

== See also ==
- Nissan Saurus
