= Speed Racer in The Challenge of Racer X =

1992 video game

- Developer: Accolade
- Publisher: Accolade
- Producer: Todd Thorson
- Designers: Tom Loughry; Joel Dinolt (tracks)
- Programmer: Tom Loughry
- Artist: Taunya Shiffer
- Composer: Rudy Helm
- Platform: MS-DOS
- Release: USA: 1992
- Genre: Racing
- Modes: Single-player, multiplayer

Speed Racer in The Challenge of Racer X is a 1992 game for MS-DOS designed and published by Accolade. The objective is to challenge Racer X on various race circuits until there is one winner. A Genesis version was planned but never released. Plans for a Super NES version later evolved into a companion game, Speed Racer in My Most Dangerous Adventures.

== Gameplay ==
Players compete against Racer X and other drivers in six different courses, either using the Mach Five or the Shooting Star. Players can also purchase and upgrade the Mach 5's special functions to gain advantages over the opponents.

== Development ==
The Challenge of Racer X originally began development for the Sega Genesis and the Super Nintendo Entertainment System and several advertisements for such versions have surfaced. While the Sega Genesis version was never released, the planned Super NES version was eventually released in 1994 as Speed Racer in My Most Dangerous Adventures, a significantly different game that intersperses racing and side-scrolling platforming action. Accolade's decision to make the Super NES game different than The Challenge of Racer X was attributed to both systems' differing capabilities and target audience.

== Speed Racer and the development of Windows 95 ==
Speed Racer played a major role in the development of Windows 95 for compatibility to DOS games. It was used to find a bug, that was triggered by its DOS extenders. The fix had a large impact on all DOS games, that used the same DOS Extender.

== Reception ==
Computer Gaming World in January 1994 criticized Speed Racer, stating that "any computer game enthusiast will laugh at the graphics", Pole Position and Out Run were superior in "driveability", and there were "several serious bugs". The magazine concluded that despite "being built on a solid idea ... it was very easy to park this game in the lot of disappointments".

In 1996, Computer Gaming World declared Speed Racer the 28th-worst computer game ever released.
