= Mach GoGoGo (1997 TV series) =

1997 Japanese-created media franchise

- マッハGoGoGo
- Genre: Action, Racing
- Created by: Tatsunoko Production
- Developed by: Masaaki Sakurai
- Directed by: Hiroshi Sasagawa (chief); Hiroyuki Fukushima (1–21); Tsuneo Tominaga (22–34)
- Music by: Michiru Ōshima
- Country of origin: Japan
- Original language: Japanese
- No. of episodes: 34

Production
- Executive producer: Kenji Yoshida
- Producers: Yumi Murase (TV Tokyo); Makiko Iwata (TV Tokyo); Minoru Ohno (Yomiko Advertising); Masatoshi Yui (Tatsunoko Pro)
- Production companies: TV Tokyo; Yomiko Advertising; Tatsunoko Production

Original release
- Network: TXN (TV Tokyo)
- Release: January 9 – September 25, 1997

Mach GoGoGo (マッハGoGoGo, Mahha GōGōGō), sometimes referred to as New Mach GoGoGo (新・マッハGoGoGo, Shin Mahha GōGōGō), is a 1997 remake of the 1967 anime series of the same name (aired as Speed Racer in the U.S.) by Tatsunoko Production, the original producers. The show aired in Japan in 1997 on TV Tokyo and lasted only 34 episodes of a planned 52.

In 1998, Speed Racer Enterprises planned to release an English dub of the series in the United States as Speed Racer Y2K which featured a cover of the original Speed Racer opening theme song Go Speed Racer Go by the rock band Sponge which was featured on the 1995 Saturday Morning: Cartoons' Greatest Hits tribute album, though the project did not succeed and only the third episode, "Silver Phantom", was dubbed.

Another English adaptation, Speed Racer X, was produced by DIC Entertainment Corporation & Speed Racer Enterprises and aired in the United States on Nickelodeon's short-lived action block, "SLAM!", in 2002. This show was quickly taken off the air (with only 13 episodes dubbed) due to a lawsuit between DiC Entertainment and the Santa Monica-based Speed Racer Enterprises, the company which owned the American rights to the franchise at the time.

The series got a Blu-ray release in Japan on April 21, 2017. Funimation released the series under the name Mach GoGoGo: Restart with English subtitles.

== Differences from the original series ==
In this version, Rex Racer does not run away, but is presumed dead after an accident while testing out the Mach 5. His father, Pops, later rebuilds the Mach 5 with a new safety system called "Safety Seven", seven functions built into the car to protect the driver, marked by the letters A through G on the steering wheel. Rex's younger brother and Pops' second son, Speed, decides to follow up in his brother's footsteps. Trixie appears in this series as a reporter who befriends Speed, with Spritle being her younger brother (as opposed to being Speed's younger brother in the original).

There are also differences that exist even in the original Japanese version. Aside from Gō's different surname (Hibiki), other characters were replaced entirely, but have similar roles. For instance, Mai Kazami is the "Michi Shimura" (the original Trixie) of this series, with her younger brother Wataru representing "Kurio Mifune" (the original Spritle). Although Pops is still called Daisuke, Mom Racer (Aya Mifune in the original) is now known as Misuzu. In Episode 20, a baby gorilla named Rocky joins the cast, taking the role that in the original series was held by Sanpei, or Chim-Chim in the English dub. Sabu, Pops' apprentice mechanic and friend to Go in the original series has been replaced by Takumi, who has the same role. The English dub uses the same names from the original Speed Racer English dub, though the family's team is still called "Hibiki Motors".

The first 21 episodes form a story arc focusing on the Earth Grand Prix and the events leading up to it. The next 13 episodes formed a new story arc involving time traveling. When the Mach 5 hits 555 km/h, it sends Speed and his friends to the year 2555 where the world is ruled by a blue-skinned alien named Handler, who plans to use a device called the Ezekiel Wheel to rule time.

== Voice cast ==
=== Japanese ===
- Kōichi Tōchika - Go Hibiki (響 剛, Hibiki Go)
- Kazusa Murai - Mai Kazami (風見 舞, Kazami Mai)
- Motoko Kumai - Wataru Kazami (風見 ワタル, Kazami Wataru)
- Minoru Inaba - Daisuke Hibiki (響 大輔, Hibiki Daisuke)
- Yōko Sōmi - Misuzu Hibiki (響 美鈴, Hibiki Misuzu)
- Toshiyuki Morikawa - Masked Racer (覆面レーサー, Fukumen Rehsaa) / Kenichi Hibiki (響 健一, Hibiki Ken'ichi)
- Kaneto Shiozawa - Handler (ハンドラー, Handora)

=== English ===
- Dave Wittenberg - Speed Hibiki-Racer
- Dan Woren - Pops Racer
- Tifanie Christun - Trixie and Spritle Kazami
- Michelle Ruff - Mrs. Hibiki-Racer
- Joshua Seth - Sparky
- Richard Epcar - Racer X / Rex Hibiki-Racer

== All 34 Episodes ==
No.	Title	Written by	Original release date	Original airdate (U.S.)
1	"Its Name is the Mach 5!!" / "Race to the Start" "Sono Na wa Mahha-gō!!" (その名はマッハ号!!)	Kuniaki Yamashita	9 January 1997	25 August 2002
Rookie racer Go Hibiki competes in the World Battle Grand Prix in the Mach 5, while aspiring photographer Mai Kazami and her brother Wataru befriend Daisuke "Pops" Hibiki and other members of the Mach 5 team.
2	"A Dead Heat Pursuit" / "Race to the Finish" "Tsuigeki no Deddo Hīto" (追撃のデッドヒート)	Masashi Kubota	16 January 1997	1 September 2002
Go must endure stiff competition and dirty tricks to survive the World Battle Grand Prix.
3	"The Ghost Lurking on the Highway" / "Silver Phantom" "Haiuei ni Hisomu Bōrei" (ハイウェイに潜む亡霊)	Kuniaki Yamashita	23 January 1997	8 September 2002
A masked man calling himself the Silver Phantom has been attacking professional racing drivers and has now set his sights on Go and the Mach 5. Meanwhile, Go tells Mai the story of how his older brother, Kenichi, died while testing the Mach 5.
4	"The Deep Sea Express Train Rescue Mission" "Shinkai Tokkyū Kyūshutsu Dai Sakusen" (深海特急・救出大作戦)	Nobuaki Kishima	30 January 1997	-
Wataru and his friend Jun find themselves aboard a train, the Dolphin Express, when it becomes hijacked. Go and Mai race to rescue them.
5	"A Challenge from the Champion" / "Rivals" "Chanpion kara no Chōsen-jō" (チャンピオンからの挑戦状)	Masashi Kubota	6 February 1997	15 September 2002
Manipulated by Cecile Hazuki, Go and new world champion Jetson race against each other.
6	"Friend or Foe? The Mysterious Racer X" / "The Mysterious Racer X" "Teki ka Mikata ka? Nazo no Rēsā Ekkusu" (敵か味方か?謎のレーサー・X)	Hiroyuki Fukushima	13 February 1997	22 September 2002
As Go and other racers prepare for the Earth Grand Prix, Exelion sends their agent, Hessler, to prevent Go from competing. Their confrontation is stopped by the mysterious Racer X.
7	"Assault! Mephistopheles" / "The Terminizer" "Kyōshū! Mefisutoferesu" (強襲!メフィストフェレス)	Masashi Kubota	20 February 1997	29 September 2002
Go faces off against Exelion's agent, Hessler, in his first preliminary round of the Earth Grand Prix.
8	"Mai's Getting Married?! A Young Racer Causes a Stir" / "Crasher Kid" "Mai ga Kekkon!? Arashi wo Yobu Shōnen Rēsā" (舞が結婚!?嵐を呼ぶ少年レーサー)	Kuniaki Yamashita	27 February 1997	6 October 2002
In his second preliminary round of the Earth Grand Prix, Go faces off against 14 year old racing prodigy the Crusher Kid, who insists that Mai shall marry him he shall win.
9	"Ninja of Light! Uncover the Secret of the Shadow!!" "Hikari no Ninja! Shadō no Himitsu wo Abake!!" (光の忍者!シャドウの秘密を暴け!!)	Manabu Nakamura	6 March 1997	-
Go helps UNPO Detective Cathy catch a dangerous criminal known as Shadow.
10	"Face-Off! Masked Racer X" / "Race Against X" "Taiketsu! Fukumen Rēsā Ekkusu" (対決!覆面レーサーX)	Hidemi Kamata	13 March 1997	13 October 2002
In his third preliminary round of the Earth Grand Prix, Go faces off against Racer X.
11	"Rise Again! The Glorious Pegasus's Return Stake" / "Good Sport" "Yomigaere! Fukkatsu ni Kaketa Eikō no Pegasasu" (蘇れ!復活に賭けた栄光のペガサス)	Koichi Mizuide	20 March 1997	20 October 2002
In his fourth preliminary round of the Earth Grand Prix, Go races against Alfred Hyman, an experienced veern racer and driver of the White Pegasus.
12	"A Mysterious Assault?! Jetson is Targeted!" "Nazo no Shūgeki!? Nerawareta Jettoson!" (謎の襲撃!?狙われたジェットソン!)	Masashi Kubota	27 March 1997	-
Prior to his race with Cido Lopes, Jetson is abducted by Exelion and Go races to rescue him.
13	"Enter the Warp! The Ingenious Professor's Strange Love" / "The Big Test" "Wāpu-gō Tōjō! Tensai Kyōju no Ijō na Aijō" (ワープ号登場!天才教授の異常な愛情)	Nobuaki Kishima	3 April 1997	27 October 2002
Professor Denki Akihabara, who Cathy suspects of stealing gold bullion, challenges Go and the Mach 5 to a race against his car, the Warp.
14	"Running Wild with the Devil! The Gargoyle Awakens" / "Terminal Velocity" "Akuma to Bōsō! Gāgoiru no Mezame" (悪魔と暴走!ガーゴイルのめざめ)	Hidemi Kamata	10 April 1997	3 November 2002
Hoping to defeat Go in a race, Exelion recruits Ryo, a childhood friend of Mai, to drive the Gargoyle, a machine said to be possessed by an evil spirit.
15	"Mai Kazami's On-the-Spot Report: Who is X?!" / "The Jinx of Racer X" "Kazami Mai no Totsugeki Repōto Ekkusu wa Dare da!?" (風見舞の突撃レポートXは誰だ!?)	Kuniaki Yamashita	17 April 1997	10 November 2002
Mai, determined to uncover the identity of Racer X, gets caught in the struggle between him and the vengeance seeking Wilsum brothers.
16	"Big City Terror! The Serial Blast Notice of Vengeance" "Dai Tokai no Senritsu! Fukushū no Renzoku Bakuha Yokoku" (大都会の戦慄!復讐の連続爆破予告)	Koichi Mizuide	24 April 1997	-
Escaped criminal Kreuz begins his reign of terror, threatening both Detective Cathy and the Mach 5.
17	"The Shadow Mach 5, Albatross" / "Race to the Finals" "Kage no Mahha-gō Arubatorosu" (影のマッハ号・アルバトロス)	Hiroyuki Fukushima	1 May 1997	17 November 2002
In his final preliminary heat, Go races against the Albatross, a car made by Exelion with uncanny similarities to the Mach 5.
18	"The Amazon Grand Prix Story: Part 1 - Professor Akihabara's Trap" "Amazon Guran Puri-hen: Akihabara Kyōju no Wana" (アマゾングランプリ編 秋葉原教授の罠)	Masaaki Sakurai	8 May 1997	-
At the Amazon Grand Prix, Professor Akihabara returns with unknown motives. During the competition, the racers are attacked by a group of locals protecting ancient ruins.
19	"The Amazon Grand Prix Story: Part 2 - The Reposed Golden Statue" "Amazon Guran Puri-hen: Nemureru Kogane zō" (アマゾングランプリ編 眠れる黄金像)	Masaaki Sakurai	15 May 1997	-
Go races to stop Professor Akihabara from claiming the golden statue hidden in the ruins of Azco.
20	"The Swift Animal Soldier, Cheetah King" "Saisoku no Yajū Heishi: Chītā Kingu" (最速の野獣兵士 チーターキング)	Masaaki Sakurai	22 May 1997	-
While training under Pop's college Aaron, Go encounters scientists who have been experimenting on a wild cheetah. Wataru adopts a baby gorilla named Rocky.
21	"Earth Grand Prix: The Desperate Mirage Shot" "Āsu Guran Puri Kesshi no Mirāju Shūto" (アースグランプリ決死のミラージュシュート)	Kuniaki Yamashita; Hidemi Kamata	29 May 1997	-
The Earth Grand Prix Final is held, starting in New York, moving west over 30,000 km, and finishing in Athens.
22	"The Mach 5: A New Journey" "Mahha Gō Arata Naru Tabidachi" (マッハ号新たなる旅立ち)	Masaaki Sakurai	8 June 1997	-
While running from a tornado, Go, Mai, Wataru, Rocky and the Mach 5 hit 555 km/h and are transported 555 years into the future. They are met by Dr. Geppetto, who warns about Handler, a despot who rules over a dystopian future on the verge of running out of energy. Geppetto then gives Go a device that will allow him to control his time jumps and asks him to locate the four Ezekiel Wheels, alien devices of incredibe power which have been scattered through time.
23	"Scramble! The Mysterious Disc in the Old West" "Sōdatsu-sen! Seibu ni Nemuru Nazo no Enban" (争奪戦!西部に眠る謎の円盤)	Kuniaki Yamashita	15 June 1997	-
In the old west, Go befriends a girl named Cindy and helps rescue her father, who has been forced to work in a gold mine where an Ezekiel Wheel has been located.
24	"Dinosaur Paradise: Safeguard the Ancient Lives!" "Kyōryū no Rakuen Taiko no Inochi wo Mamore!" (恐竜の楽園太古の命を守れ!)	Koichi Mizuide	22 June 1997	-
Go and the others arrive in the time of dinosaurs where they meet time-traveller Joanna, who is there to study the prehistoric beasts. Together they work to keep an Ezekiel Wheel out of the hands of Handler's minions.
25	"Fierce Fight in the Near Future - A Life-or-Death Battle Race" "Gekitō no Kin Mirai - Seishi wo Kaketa Batoru Rēsu" (激闘の近未来 生死を賭けたバトルレース)	Hidemi Kamata	29 June 1997	-
In the year 2252, Go is arrested and forced to enter a battle race to avoid execution.
26	"The Soul of Franke, the Medieval Knight" "Chūsei no Kishi Furanke no Tamashī" (中世の騎士フランケの魂)	Kuniaki Yamashita	6 July 1997	-
Go and the others, now joined by Takumi, look for an Ezekiel Wheel in medieval Europe. There they meet Dr Stein and his mechanical son Franke who may have some connection to the Ezekiel Wheel.
27	"The Mysterious Sun God: Race to the Pyramid!" "Shinpi no Taiyō Shin Piramiddo e Hashire!" (神秘の太陽神ピラミッドへ走れ!)	Koichi Mizuide	13 July 1997	-
Go and the others search for an Ezekiel Wheel in ancient Egypt, which is about to be moved inside a pyramid. Mai is mistaken for an Egyptian princess and the two switch places.
28	"The Legend on the Ocean Floor: Atlantis" "Kaitei ni Shizunda Densetsu Atorantisu" (海底に沈んだ伝説アトランティス)	Hidemi Kamata	20 July 1997	-
Go and friends travel 12,000 years into the past hoping to find an Ezekiel Wheel on the sunken continent of Atlantis before Handler's men do.
29	"X Returns! Dash Handler's Aspirations" "Ekkusu Futatabi! Handorā no Yabō wo Kudake" (Xふたたび!ハンドラーの野望を砕け)	Koichi Mizuide	27 July 1997	-
Clutch delivers the fourth Ezekiel Wheel to Handler in the future. Go and the others arrive in the future, and when they are attacked by Clutch, are rescued by Racer X. During the battle, one of the Ezekiel Wheels escapes Handler's grasp and vanishes.
30	"A Sun Hidden in a Glacier: Follow the Giant Mammoth!" "Hyōga ni kakureta Taiyō Kyodai Manmosu wo Oe!" (氷河に隠れた太陽巨大マンモスを追え!)	Kuniaki Yamashita	4 August 1997	-
Go and company travel 20,000 years into the past to search for an Ezekiel Wheel in the Stone Age.
31	"A Mesage to Heaven: The Mach 5 Draws a Geoglyph!" "Ten e no Messēji Mahha-gō, Chijō Ewokaku!" (天へのメッセージマッハ号、地上絵を描く!)	Koichi Mizuide	11 August 1997	-
Go and the others search for an Ezekiel wheel during the reign of the Nazco civilization.
32	"Temptation from the Afterlife: Love-Starved Memories" "Meikai Kara no Yūwaku Ai ni Ueta Omoide-tachi" (冥界からの誘惑愛にうえた思い出たち)	Hidemi Kamata	18 August 1997	-
Go and the others arrive in 2036, where the ghost of a female driver keeps challenging other drivers to races, races that tend to end with her opponents crashing.
33	"Friendships Reborn: The Strongest Rivals Assemble" "Yomigaeru Yūjō Shūketsu, Saikyō no Saibaru" (蘇る友情集結、最強のライバル)	Hidemi Kamata	25 August 1997	-
In the present year of 2001, an Ezekiel Wheel crashes to Earth in the Amazon Rainforest. Go calls on the aid of his rivals from the World Grand Prix to help retrieve it before Handler's minions.
34	"A Showdown for the Future: The Fall of Handler's Castle" "Mirai wo Kaketa Kessen Hōkai, Handorā-jō" (未来を賭けた決戦崩壊、ハンドラー城)	Masaaki Sakurai	24 September 1997	-
Go and his allies travel to the year 2555 to stop Handler from using the Ezekiel Wheels and defeat the tyrant for good.

== Other media ==
A two-volume manga adaptation was published on CoroCoro Comic in 1997. It is a kodomo manga aimed at a younger audience.

A video game based on the series was developed by TOSE and published by Tomy Corporation, exclusively in Japan for the Game Boy. The game also has Super Game Boy support.

== The Song Lyrics of Fly To The Dream (1997) ==
Fly To The Dream Lyrics
Even If Your Having A Bit Of A Rough Time The Shining Skies Still Spread Out

You Can Take Off and Fly Wherever You Want with a Heart Freer Than The Wind Fly To The Dream Your Courage and Hope Carry The Worlds Future Within Them Fly To The Dream Any Way You Wish With All Your Might On The Wings Of Your Dreams Go On Take Flight
