= Guyver =

Guyver may refer to:

- Guyver (surname), a surname (and list of people with that surname)
- Bio Booster Armor Guyver, a Japanese manga series by Yoshiki Takaya
  - Guyver: Out of Control, a Japanese original video animation
  - The Guyver: Bio-Booster Armor, a Japanese original video animation series
  - The Guyver, a 1991 American-Japanese live-action film
  - Guyver: Dark Hero, a 1994 American live-action film
  - Guyver: The Bioboosted, a Japanese anime television series
- Guyver (DJ), British hard trance record producer
