= Jimmie Walker =

American actor (born 1947)

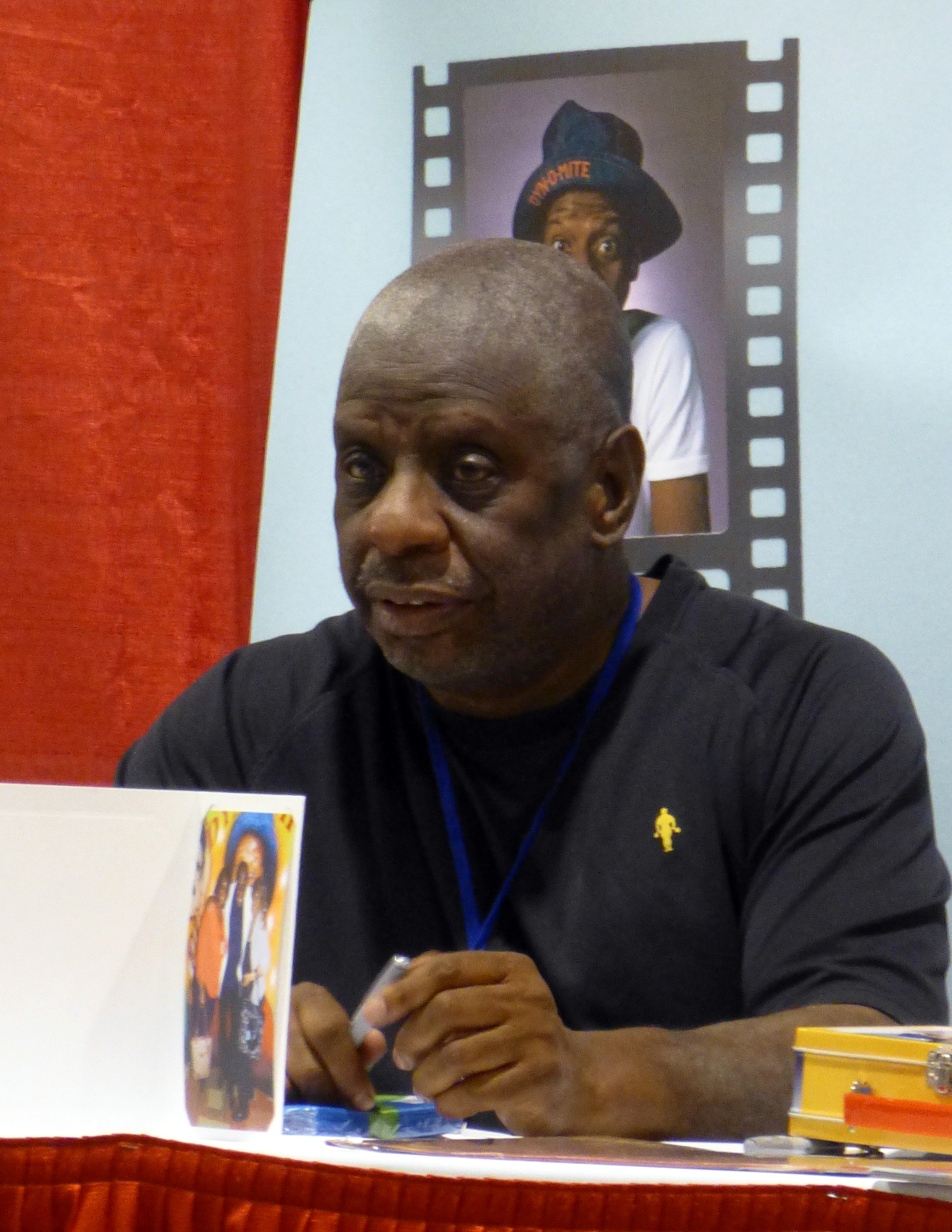
- Walker in 2015
- Born: James Carter Walker Jr. June 25, 1947 (age 79); New York City, U.S.
- Education: Theodore Roosevelt High School
- Occupations: Actor, comedian
- Years active: 1969–present
- Known for: J.J. Evans – Good Times
- Website: jimmiejjwalkerdynomite.com

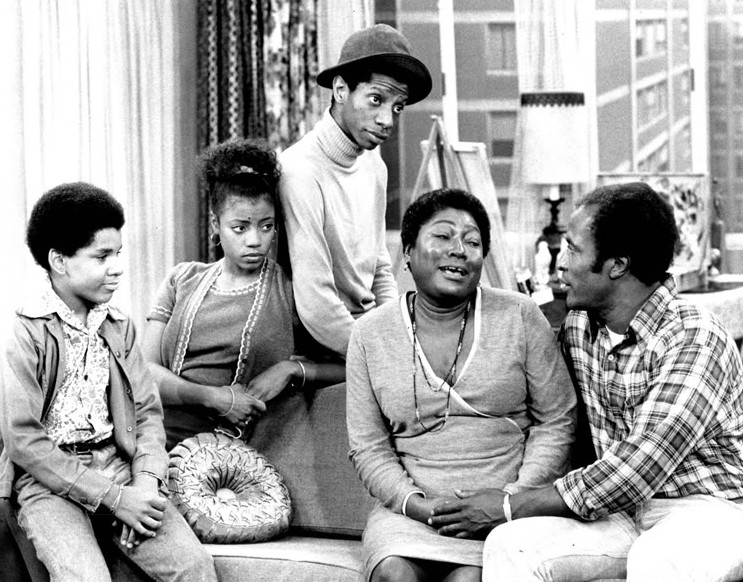
On Good Times (1974), L–R: Ralph Carter, BernNadette Stanis, Jimmie Walker, Esther Rolle and John Amos

James Carter Walker Jr. (born June 25, 1947) is an American actor and comedian. He portrayed James ("J.J.") Evans Jr., the older son of James Evans Sr. and Florida Evans, on the CBS television comedy series Good Times. The show ran from 1974 to 1979, and Walker was nominated for a Golden Globe Award in 1975 and 1976 for his role as J.J. On Good Times, Walker's character was known for his catchphrase "Dyn-o-mite!", and the actor later used it in his mid-1970s TV commercials for Panasonic cassette and 8-track tape players and in a 2021–2023 public announcement for Medicare.

Walker also starred in Let's Do It Again (1975) with John Amos, and The Greatest Thing That Almost Happened (1977) with James Earl Jones. Walker continues to tour the country with his stand-up comedy routine.

== Early life and education ==
Walker was born in Brooklyn, New York, and raised in the Melrose Projects of Melrose, Bronx. He attended Theodore Roosevelt High School in New York City. Through a New York State funded program known as SEEK (Search for Education, Evaluation, and Knowledge), he continued his studies and entered into the field of radio engineering with WRVR. As a young man, Walker was a vendor at Yankee Stadium, starting with the 1964 World Series.

== Early career ==
In 1967, Walker began working full-time with WRVR, the radio station of the Riverside Church. In 1969, Walker began performing as a stand-up comedian and was eventually discovered by the casting director for Good Times, after making appearances on Rowan & Martin's Laugh In and on the Jack Paar Show. He eventually released one stand-up comedy album during the height of his Good Times popularity: Dyn-o-mite on Buddah Records (5635). During Good Times' 1974–75 season, Walker was 26 years old, though his character was much younger. John Amos, the actor who portrayed Walker's father on Good Times, was actually just eight years older than Walker.

Walker credits producer/director John Rich for inventing "Dyn-o-mite!", which Rich insisted Walker say on every episode. Both Walker and executive producer Norman Lear were skeptical of the idea, but the phrase and Walker's character caught on with the audience.

Off- and on-camera, Walker did not get along with the series' lead, Esther Rolle, because she and Amos disapproved of Walker's increasingly buffoonish character and his popularity, and Walker felt hurt by their disdain. Dissatisfaction led Amos to leave the show before Rolle did, making Walker the star of the show. Walker was the only Good Times star to not attend Rolle's funeral.

== Later career ==
During 1975, Walker was also a weekend personality on contemporary R&B music station KAGB 103.9 FM licensed to Inglewood in the Los Angeles market.

Walker appeared on The Tonight Show and Match Game during the 1970s and early 1980s. He was a five-time panelist on the Match Game-Hollywood Squares Hour from 1983 to 1984. He also appeared on the 1990 revival of Match Game and various game shows during that era.

Walker has made guest appearances on Badge 373, The Love Boat, Fantasy Island, The Larry Sanders Show, Son of the Beach, The Drew Carey Show, The John Larroquette Show, In the House, Cagney & Lacey, The Fall Guy, Scrubs, Star Dates, Everybody Hates Chris, George Lopez, Chelsea Lately and Lincoln Heights. He also appeared in the films Rabbit Test (1978), The Concorde... Airport '79 (1979), Airplane! (1980), Water (1985), Doin' Time (1985), The Guyver (1991), Monster Mash (1995) and Plump Fiction (1997).

Aside from guest appearances, he starred in the short-lived television series At Ease in 1983 and Bustin' Loose in 1987.

In the 1990s, Walker returned to his radio roots hosting shows on WHIO, WOAI, WLS and KKAR. In 1996, he appeared on split release with Powerviolence band Spazz distributed by Spazz-owned label Slap-a-ham records.

In 2010, Walker made a cameo appearance in the movie Big Money Rustlas. In 2011, he appeared in a Syfy channel movie Super Shark. On May 4, 2023 he made a guest appearance on The Bold and the Beautiful.

In 2012, Walker's autobiography, Dyn-o-mite! Good Times, Bad Times, Our Times – A Memoir, was published. In 2012, Walker announced the release of his official app developed by Monty Goulet for iOS.

Walker has also appeared on Funny You Should Ask and Comics Unleashed. He was honored during an episode for his contribution to Byron Allen's career, as well as the impact he had on David Letterman and Jay Leno.

== Personal life and political views ==
According to an appearance on The Wendy Williams Show on June 27, 2012, Walker stated he has never been married nor fathered children, but has had many girlfriends. Walker appeared on The O'Reilly Factor on July 11, 2012. He stated that he did not vote for Barack Obama in 2008 and that he would not vote for him in the 2012 election either. In an interview with CNN, Walker described himself politically as a "realist independent" and stated that he opposed affirmative action, saying that it had outlived its usefulness. He also said that he was against gay marriage on moral grounds, but believed its legalization should be passed, stating it was not worth fighting against. Walker was also vocal of his support for Donald Trump in 2017.

Walker described his political beliefs at length in his autobiography, Dyn-O-Mite: Good Times, Bad Times, Our Times: A Memoir. In it, he called himself a "logicist," who believes in "logic and common sense", holding conservative positions on many issues.

== Filmography ==
=== Film ===
Year	Film	Role	Notes
1975	Let's Do It Again	"Bootney" Farnsworth	Action/crime film directed by Sidney Poitier.
1978	Rabbit Test	Umbuto	Comedy film directed and written by Joan Rivers.
1979	The Concorde... Airport '79	Boisie	Air disaster film directed by David Lowell Rich.
1980	Airplane!	Windshield Wiper Man	Parody film directed and written by David Zucker, Jim Abrahams, and Jerry Zucker.
1988	Going Bananas	Mozambo	Comedy directed by Boaz Davidson about a talking chimpanzee. The film was shot on location in Zimbabwe.
1991	The Guyver	M.C. Striker	Science fiction film directed by Screaming Mad George and co-directed by Steve Wang.
1992	Home Alone 2: Lost in New York	Celeb #3	Christmas comedy film directed by Chris Columbus and written and produced by John Hughes.
2010	Big Money Rustlas	Townsperson	Parody film written by Joe Bruce and Paul Andresen and directed by Andresen. Follow up film of, Big Money Hustlas.
2011	Super Shark	"Dynamite" Stevens	Sci-fi horror film written and directed by Fred Olen Ray.
2012	David E. Talbert's What Goes Around Comes Around	Preacher	Direct-to-video
2016	The Comedian	Comedy club host	Comedy drama film directed by Taylor Hackford and written by Lewis Friedman, Richard LaGravenese, Art Linson, and Jeff Ross.

=== Television ===
Year	Film	Role	Notes
1974	Tattletales	Himself	Appeared with "fiancé" Samantha Stone (Episodes #2.62-2.66, aired the week of December 23, 1974)
1974–1979	Good Times	James "J.J." Evans Jr.	133 episodes
1974	Tony Orlando and Dawn	Himself	Episode: "Episode #1.2" (S1:E2)
1977	Bob Hope television specials	Himself	Episode: "Bob Hope's All-Star Comedy Tribute to Vaudeville" (S27:E4)
1977	The Greatest Thing That Almost Happened	Morris Bird III	Made-for-TV-Movie directed by Gilbert Moses.
1977–1985	The Love Boat	Ronald	Episode: "The Captain And The Lady/One If By Land/Centerfold" (S1:E1) (1977)
1977–1985	The Love Boat	The Late Mickey Garner	Episode: "Till Death Do Us Part-Maybe/Locked Away/Chubs" (S2:E9) (1978)
1977–1985	The Love Boat	Wally	Episode: "The Brotherhood of the Sea/Daddy's Pride/Letter to Babycakes" (S3:E10) (1979)
1977–1985	The Love Boat	Marvin Jones	Episode: "The Mallory Quest/Julie, the Vamp/The Offer": Parts 1 (S4:E5) and 2 (S4:E6) (1980)
1977–1985	The Love Boat	Marty Kilmer	Episode: "Charmed, I'm Sure/Ashes to Ashes/No Dad of Mine" (S8:E25) (1985)
1980	B.A.D. Cats	Rodney Washington	Episode: "Pilot" (S1:E1)
1980	Murder Can Hurt You	Parks, The Pusher	Made-for-TV-Movie directed by Roger Duchowny.
1980	The White Shadow	Himself	Episode: "If Your Number's Up, Get It Down" (S3:E3)
1982	Today's FBI	Reggie	Episode: "Bank Job" (S1:E16)
1982	Fantasy Island	Jay	Episode: "The Beautiful Skeptic/The Lost Platoon" (S6:E6)
1983	Cagney & Lacey	Tony Brown	Episode: "Chop Shop" (S2:E18)
1983	At Ease	Sergeant Val Valentine	14 episodes
1983–1984	Match Game-Hollywood Squares Hour	Himself (celebrity panelist)	Five weeks' worth of episodes
1987–1988	Bustin' Loose	Sonny Barnes	26 episodes
1994	The Larry Sanders Show	Himself	Episode: The Gift Episode
1994	Blossom	Himself	Episode: Season 4 Episode 20 The Flip Side
1995	In the House	Darryl	Episode: "Nanna Don't Play"
1996	Space Ghost Coast to Coast	Himself	Episode: "Surprise"
2001–2002	Scrubs	Himself	Episodes: "My Bad" (S 1:Ep 6), and "My Blind Date" (S1:E12)
2003	George Lopez	Lionel	Episode: Dubya, Dad, and Dating (Part 1) (S3: E1)
2006–2008	Everybody Hates Chris	Gene	Episodes: "Everybody Hates Funerals" (S1:E17), "Everybody Hates Gambling" (S2:E19), and "Everybody Hates the Port Authority" (S3:E11)
2006	Minoriteam	Fasto's Grandfather	Episode: "Balactus: Part II"
2018–2020	Funny You Should Ask	Himself	6 episodes
2019	Live in Front of a Studio Audience: Good Times	Himself	
2023	The Bold and the Beautiful	Count Bouche	

=== Video game ===
Year	Film	Role	Notes
1996	Ripper	Soap Beatty	Interactive movie

== See also ==
- Black conservatism in the United States
