= Drive (1997 film) =

1997 film directed by Steve Wang

- DVD cover
- Directed by: Steve Wang
- Written by: Scott Phillips
- Produced by: Mitsuru Kurosawa; Michael Leahy
- Starring: Mark Dacascos; Kadeem Hardison; Brittany Murphy; Tracey Walter; John Pyper-Ferguson
- Cinematography: Michael Wojciechowski
- Edited by: Ivan Ladizinsky
- Music by: Walter Werzowa (theatrical cut); David C. Williams (director's cut)
- Production company: NEO Motion Pictures; Overseas FilmGroup; Ozla Productions
- Distributed by: Simitar Entertainment (U.S.)
- Release dates: August 4, 1997 (Germany); August 11, 1998 (U.S.)
- Running time: 98 minutes (theatrical cut); 118 minutes (director's cut)
- Country: United States; Japan
- Language: English

Drive is a 1997 science-fiction action film directed by Steve Wang and starring Mark Dacascos, Kadeem Hardison, Tracey Walter, John Pyper-Ferguson, Brittany Murphy, and Masaya Kato. Dacascos plays a cybernetically enhanced agent, who teams up with a civilian (Hardison) to escape those trying to recapture him.

The film is an American and Japanese co-production. In the United States, Drive premiered on HBO before ultimately being released straight-to-video. It has since developed a cult following.

== Plot ==
Toby Wong, a former government agent from Hong Kong, has an advanced cybernetic implant that gives him superhuman speed, strength and agility. Not wanting the device to fall into the Chinese government's hands post-handover, Wong smuggles himself to San Francisco, planning to sell the device to a company in Los Angeles for $5 million. Mercenaries led by Vic Madison pursue him.

While being chased, Toby enters a bar where he meets a down-on-his-luck, gregarious songwriter named Malik Brody. After Toby dispatches his pursuers, wrecking the bar, the police arrive. They believe Toby is a criminal and try to apprehend him. To escape, Toby takes Malik hostage. Once they are in Malik's car, Toby assures him that he means Malik no harm, and asks him for a lift to Los Angeles. Malik is initially incredulous and refuses, but the two are still being chased by Madison and his men (Toby's device emits a tracking signal they can follow). After a variety of adventures, including being handcuffed together by Madison and escaping a bus station ambush, the two form a friendship and Malik agrees to bring Toby to Los Angeles.

The pair stop at a motel, whose proprietor Deliverance Bodine is instantly enamored with Malik. Madison and his men assault the motel and try to capture Toby using shock sticks. Toby beats them up, while Malik and Deliverance get into a gun fight with more mercenaries in the garage. Deliverance proves to be both crazy and extremely effective with guns. Ultimately Madison becomes so frustrated at his team's failures that he blows up the motel with a triple rocket launcher, but Toby, Malik and Deliverance escape. Toby and Malik leave Deliverance at a diner and continue on, stopping at a karaoke bar.

The chairman of the company that created the device, Mr. Lau, has been bankrolling the pursuit of Toby. Lau's team replicates and improves the device that was installed in Toby, and they implant this new version in another man, the "Advanced Model." Lau orders the Advanced Model to take control of the hunt for Toby and to kill him, since they no longer need Toby's older model of the device. Madison chafes at having to take orders from the Advanced Model, but ultimately acquiesces.

Toby and Malik have a climactic showdown with the Advanced Model, Madison, and the mercenaries in the karaoke bar. After a long battle, Toby destroys the Advanced Model. Malik, meanwhile, manages to defeat Madison. The two depart for Los Angeles to deliver the device to the US buyer, with Toby now planning to split the money with Malik.

== Cast ==
- Mark Dacascos as Toby Wong
- Kadeem Hardison as Malik Brody
- John Pyper-Ferguson as Vic Madison
- Brittany Murphy as Deliverance Bodine
- Tracey Walter as "Hedgehog"
- James Shigeta as Mr. Lau
- Masaya Kato as the Advanced Model
- Sanaa Lathan as Carolyn Brody
- Dom Magwili as Chow
- Ron Yuan as Razor Scarred
- Clive Rosengren as Cantwell
- Christopher Michael as Jeb
- Ted Smith as Joss
- R. A. Mihailoff as Singing Trucker
- David Hayter as Police Officer
- Herb Mitchell as State Trooper
- Geoff Edwards as Himself

== Production ==
Steve Wang had wanted the film to be a more comedic action film which he described as Jackie Chan by way of John Woo but as the producers had no faith in Wang's ability to direct comedy, Wang instead presented the Scott Phillips script at face value as a serious straightforward action film.

Wang said the frantic production schedule and chaotic atmosphere around the film allowed him, Mark Dacascos, and Kadeem Hardison ample opportunity to ad lib the production into the style they wanted. Rather surprisingly, once Wang showed the producers the dailies they loved what they saw and allowed Wang more creative freedom and extensions on the production budget.

Koichi Sakamoto, previously known for his work on the Power Rangers franchise, was the film's action choreographer. Masaya Kato was cast at the behest of Mark Dacascos, after the two had previously worked together on Crying Freeman.

== Release ==
In the United States, the film premiered on HBO before ultimately being released straight-to-video. The film premiered on HBO on December 26, 1997 with encore airings in January and August of 1998. The film was given a home video release on August 11, 1998.

It received a theatrical release in other territories, like the Philippines and Japan.

=== Home media ===
The UK PAL "Special Edition" DVD formatted for NTSC includes not only a video transfer but a full restoration of Steve Wang's original cut, including a Dolby Digital 5.1 remix of the original soundtrack. The British DVD release is a special Director's Cut version, containing reinstated cut scenes and the original film score. Special extras on the DVD include newly commissioned interviews with cast and crew, director's audio track, and a feature on the Japanese stunt team responsible for the film's action scenes.

The uncut and theatrical versions were released on Blu-ray by boutique label MVD Rewind in May 2021. A 4K Blu-ray release by 88 Films debuted in 2022.

== Alternate versions ==
After Steve Wang delivered his director's cut the producers were ecstatic over the results prompting discussion of a possible theatrical run as well as high level sales at film markets. When these lofty expectations were met with lower than expected returns at the 1996 MIFED (Mercato internazionale del film e del documentario) Film Market, Overseas Filmgroup decided the issue was with Wang's cut and ordered a recut.

The US DVD, VHS and cable showings of this cult film are the "Robbie Little Cut", in which a producer on the film edited 20 minutes out of it, leaving a 98-minute running time, and replacing the original soundtrack with a techno-based score.

Deleted scenes include:

- A scene in Malik's house where Malik and Toby enter his daughters' room and they talk about his four-year-old daughter and how much he loves her.
- A scene in which Hedgehog and Madison question the existence of aliens.
- A scene after the motel fight where Deliverance hugs Toby and Malik gets a bit jealous.
- A scene in which Toby reveals he has a brother and that they were both singers once.
- A longer version of the final fight in which Toby delivers a new kick.
