= Hades Project Zeorymer =

Japanese manga series

- Cover for the Blu-ray remaster release in Japan

冥王計画(プロジェクト)ゼオライマー (Purojekuto Zeoraimā)
- Genre: Mecha, Sci-Fi, Hentai (only the first manga version)
- Manga

Project Zeorymer
- Written by: Chimi Moriwo
- Published by: Kubō Shoten (original); Tokuma Shoten (reissue)
- Magazine: Lemon People (1983–1984); Monthly Comic Ryū (2007)
- Original run: October 1983 – November 1984; Final chapters: June 2007 – September 2007
- Volumes: 1 (Note: The original volume was later reissued by Tokuma Shoten in an aizōban edition with 3 additional chapters (Final Chapters) and with the explicit sexual content downed.)
- Original video animation
- Directed by: Toshihiro Hirano
- Produced by: Tooru Miura
- Written by: Shō Aikawa
- Music by: Eiji Kawamura
- Studio: AIC & Artmic
- Licensed by: NA: Central Park Media (expired); UK: Manga Entertainment (expired)
- Released: November 26, 1988 – February 2, 1990
- Runtime: 29 minutes
- Episodes: 4
- Manga

Zeorymer Omega
- Written by: Chimi Moriwo
- Illustrated by: Watari U
- Published by: Tokuma Shoten
- Magazine: Monthly Comic Ryū
- Original run: November 2008 – April 2017
- Volumes: 13

Hades Project Zeorymer, known in Japan as Project Zeorymer (冥王計画ゼオライマー, Purojekuto Zeoraimā), is a Japanese manga series by Yoshiki Takaya, written under the pen name Chimi Moriwo, and published in the adult manga magazine Lemon People from October 1983 to November 1984. A three-part finale was serialized in Monthly Comic Ryū in 2007. A four-episode OVA adaptation by AIC tones down the explicit sexual content and deviates entirely from the manga storyline and setting.

== Manga ==
In the near future, a secret society, Nematoda, with ambitions of world domination, hired three men, Professor Akitsu, Professor Himuro, and Professor Wakatsuki, to build the ultimate "G-Class" giant robot, Zeorymer. Nearly two decades later, on his deathbed, Professor Akitsu tells his son, Masaki Akitsu, that Zeorymer must not awaken. A short time later, a new student transfers into Masaki's school, named Miku Himuro. She quickly persuades him to meet her adopted father, Professor Himuro, and Masaki is curious to find out what is going on, and what his father meant in his final words. Traveling by a high-speed pod hidden under the city, he meets Professor Himuro in a vast underground facility. Nematoda's General Golshid, aware of the Himuro's appearance in Japan, send a G-Class robot to assault their base and kill them, as they believed they had the only "Joint". Himuro compels Masaki to pilot Zeorymer and save them, as he is the only one that can pilot it. Once he agrees, Himuro and his daughter head to an operating room without Masato's knowledge, and he installs a sphere called a "Dimensional Joint" - a flawed duplicate of the original - into his daughter's womb, and she is teleported to within Zeorymer's "eye". This is necessary to utilise Zeorymer's true abilities - without them, it is simply an outdated G-Class robot. Though Masaki stumbles with the unfamiliar systems, Zeorymer eventually awakens fully, Masaki undergoes a strange and short-lived shift in personality, and with the spherical energy weapon on the back of Zeorymer's hand, destroys its opponent in a single attack.

Soon, Nematoda sends its three newest and most powerful robots after Zeorymer. Finding its pilots at school, they attempt to apprehend them, but Zeorymer is teleported to their location. Masaki's personality shifts again, and Zeorymer fights the three, despite being in the middle of a city, showing no care for civilian casualties. Zeorymer shows its power, being much faster than the fastest of the three, vastly stronger than the strongest of the three, and takes the many, many missiles of the third without damage. Finally, Zeorymer activates both of the spheres on the back of its hands and taps them together, the shockwave cleaving the final robot and several buildings behind it in two. As a result, the city has undergone immense damage, and many of its citizens are surely killed, including all of their schoolmates.

With Nematoda, General Golshid, seeing the vast power of Zeorymer, elects to pilot the powerful Rose C'est La Vie, a G-Class robot that had crippled test pilots, even at less than full power. Knowing he has little choice Golshid still elects to go, with Rose C'est La Vie at full power. Upon returning to base, Professor Himuro is shown to have collapsed and is dying of an incurable disease, and Masato realised the level of destruction fighting would cause, but strangely didn't care. Suddenly teleported to Zeorymer's cockpit, it's revealed that Masaki is the revived, evil, Professor Wakatsuki, reduced to an embryo and reborn to escape an inevitable death, Miku was Himuro's wife, who had been cheating on her husband with him, had undergone the same process as she had been caught in the same event, and that Himuro was the one to attempt to kill them. Though the three scientists were conspiring against Nematoda while they worked for the organisation, Wakatsuki was planning to betray the others and take Zeorymer for himself. Akitsu and Himuro had stolen the embryos to stop the revival, and Akitsu then took Masaki's embryo and fled from his other colleague as well. However, by activating Zeorymer, the memories and personality of Wakatsuki had been installed into Masaki, though the same was not true of Miku. Following this reveal, Wakatsuki forces himself on Miku, sexually, and uses rape to make her his.

Rose C'est La Vie lands and fights Zeorymer. Golshid successfully tears off one of Zeorymer's arms, but it is instantly regenerated in its entirety. He then successfully destroys its cockpit, killing Wakatsuki, to which both cockpit and pilot are regenerated completely. Defeated and nearly destroyed, Golshid is saved by the sudden loss of power of Zeorymer, as the Dimensional Joint had finally failed. With both robots retreating, Wakatsuki installs a new Dimensional Joint into Miku, and upon her awakening, suddenly shifts back to Masaki for a moment. With both Wakatsuki and Miku realising, Wakatsuki reinforces himself and flees. In the midst of coitus with Miku, Masaki comes to the realisation that the "fake Masaki Akitsu" was not a fake - it was not Wakatsuki's personality that was installed, just his memories. While that would be enough for a child without memories to become a "true" Masaki Wakatsuki, Masaki Akitsu's personality was too strong, and he eventually came to the realisation that he was simply being dragged along by how he thought he should be acting, thanks to Wakatsuki's memories, with Professor Himuro secretly watching. Deep in the base, Himura hovers over a switch, which would destroy the flawed Dimensional Joint in Miku's womb, killing both Miku and Masaki, but accepts that Masaki is not really Wakatsuki, and Miku is not his deceitful wife, feels guilt for considering Miku to only be a tool, and dies of his sickness. Upon finding him, Masaki decides that the only way to escape Zeorymer is by burying it himself, and decides to do so by attacking Nematoda's main base.

Arriving at Nematoda's base, Zeorymer's landing destroys many of its defending machines with the resulting shockwave, and makes short work of the remainder. Suddenly, the president of Nematoda appears, piloting a black Zeorymer, powered by the original Dimensional Fault installed into an "inhuman" Miku clone, revealing himself to be a second backup of Wakatsuki, but one with advanced aging thanks to the destruction left by the theft of the original Zeorymer affecting his regeneration. After the theft, he had killed the Nematoda president and taken his place. Fighting with Zeorymer and showing that they had equally powerful offensive and regeneration abilities, the two Zeorymer grappled and began to merge. Revealing that Zeorymer's power source was in another dimension, and that as a result, there can only be one Zeorymer, which was the reason that even Masaki couldn't make a perfect Dimensional Joint, despite having Wakatsuki's memories, the two machines merged into one, with the fake Miku collapsing, the original Dimensional Joint installing itself into Miku's womb, and Wakatsuki planning to take over Masaki's body in the process. Though Zeorymer is merged into a half-black, half-white version, Masaki, Miku and Wakatsuki were ejected from it. Wakatsuki fails to understand why, but Masaki enlightens him - Zeorymer reformatted its pilot registry when Masaki started piloting Zeorymer, and was installed with Wakatsuki's memories. Thus, Zeorymer couldn't install Wakatsuki's personality into Masaki's body. Wakatsuki's driven somewhat mad, reveals that he also has a self-destruct for the Joint in Miku's womb, but is shot and killed by Golshid, furious at Wakatsuki's murder of the original Nematoda president. However, there's a massive Deuterium Bomb under the Nematoda base, activated by Wakatsuki's death, which is large enough to destroy the world. However, Zeorymer is strong enough to survive. Rather than escaping, Masaki and Miku plan to absorb all the energy from the bomb's detonation into Zeorymer and into the other dimension. Golshid's expectation is that even Zeorymer will be destroyed, but Masaki says that he and Miku want to live, in this world that they grew up in. As they attempt it, Golshid is shown to have escaped in a pod. Though Masato and Miku succeed, the manga concludes by saying that no-one ever saw the G-Class Robot "Hades" ever again.

== Anime ==
Set in the near future, a secret organization called Tekkoryū (鉄甲龍; lit. Iron Dragon), also known as Hau Dragon (ハウ・ドラゴン, Hau Doragon), is bent on world domination. Using the electronics firm International Electronic Brains (国際電脳, Kokusai Dennō) as a front to fund their activities, Tekkoryū builds an army of eight giant robots known as the Hakkeshū (八卦衆; lit. Eight Trigrams), but Masaki Kihara, the scientist behind the Hakkeshū, betrays the Tekkoryū and steals Zeorymer of the Heavens (天のゼオライマー, Ten no Zeoraimā), along with the embryo of the pilot genetically linked to the robot. He dies shortly after handing Zeorymer and the embryo to the Japanese government. Fifteen years later, Yuratei ascends to the throne as Empress of Tekkoryū and orders the recovery or destruction of Zeorymer before proceeding with her plans to conquer the world.

=== Episodes ===
No.	Title	Release Date
1	"Project I: Separation"; Transliteration: "Ketsubetsu" (Japanese: 決別)	November 26, 1988
Fifteen-year-old Masato Akitsu is captured by government agents led by Isao Ooki and ordered to pilot Zeorymer of the Heavens. Meanwhile, newly-crowned Tekkoryū Empress Yuratei orders her lover Taiha to sortie his mecha Lanstar of the Wind (風のランスター, Kaze no Ransutā) to Japan to capture or destroy Zeorymer. When the two robots engage in combat, Masato discovers that he knows how to use Zeorymer's controls. During the battle, his persona suddenly changes to that of Masaki Kihara and quickly kills Taiha. Masato reverts to his normal self and is further confused by his past.
2	"Project II: Misgivings"; Transliteration: "Giwaku" (Japanese: 疑惑)	June 28, 1989
Masato learns from Ooki that he was a test tube baby who was genetically linked to Zeorymer. He is kidnapped by twin sisters Si Aen and Si Tau and interrogated by Yuratei over his role as Zeorymer's pilot. Miku quickly rescues him before the twins board their respective mecha Bryst of the Fire (火のブライスト, Hi no Buraisto) and Gallowin of the Water (水のガロウィン, Mizu no Garouin) and wreak havoc on the nearby town. The twins surround Zeorymer and fire their combined attack at it, but it suddenly teleports out of their sights. The twins' teamwork falls apart when Tau attempts to attack Zeorymer by herself, feeling that Aen has been holding her back and might use her as a shield during the battle. Masato once again changes to his Masaki persona, using the twins' quarreling to his advantage and wiping them out with a concentrated attack.
3	"Project III: Disillusionment"; Transliteration: "Kakusei" (Japanese: 覚醒)	December 20, 1989
Miku is abducted and tortured by Tekkoryū while Ritsu and his mecha Rose C'est la vie of the Moon (月のローズセラヴィー, Tsuki no Rōzu Seravī) head to Japan to challenge Zeorymer. Without Miku, Zeorymer can only operate at 1/3 power. Ritsu reveals to Masato that all of the Hakkeshū's pilots were genetically engineered by Prof. Kihara with specific flaws such as Taiha's unrequited love for Yuratei, and Tau and Aen's sisterly animosity. He seeks revenge on Prof. Kihara for cursing him with an effeminate face. When Masaki's persona once again takes over Masato's body, he uses Zeorymer to teleport Miku back and fully charge the mecha. After destroying the last of Rose C'est la vie's recharging satellites, Masaki swiftly kills Ritsu.
4	"Project IV: Extinction"; Transliteration: "Shūen" (Japanese: 終焉)	February 21, 1990
Yuratei has Dinodilus of the Earth (地のディノディロス, Chi no Dinodirasu) (piloted by Rockfell) and Burstone of the Mountains (山のバーストン, Yama no Bāsuton) (piloted by Gisou) attack Tokyo while Omzack of the Thunder (雷のオムザック, Ikazuchi no Omuzakku) (piloted by Saiga) wreaks havoc on the U.S. Naval fleet in the Pacific Ocean. Saiga attempts to have Rockfell and Gisou betray Tekkoryū and join him, but Zeorymer kills the trio in one fell swoop. Masaki reveals to Ooki that he secretly orchestrated all of Tekkoryū's activities and, knowing that Ooki would double-cross and kill him, he keyed his DNA into Zeorymer's computer and the embryo that would eventually grow into Masato. Following a heated mental battle, Masato regains his body. With all of her Hakkeshū wiped out, Yuratei sends Zeorymer an invitation to Tekkoryū's secret base and challenges its pilots to stop her from firing all of the world's nuclear missiles. Masato and Miku board Zeorymer for a final time and destroy the base and presumably themselves in the process.

=== Cast ===
Hades Project Zeorymer (OVA) cast
Role	Japanese	English		
Role	Japanese	Manga Entertainment/ CTV Studios (1997)		Central Park Media/ Audio Dolce (2003)
Narrator	Issei Masamune	Stephen Lyons	Stephen Lyons	Mike Pollock
Masato Akitsu	Toshihiko Seki	Daniel Marinker	Daniel Marinker	Paul Juhn
Miku Himuro	Chieko Honda	Elly Fairman	Elly Fairman	Kathleen McInerney
Isao Ooki	Hideyuki Tanaka	Roger May	Roger May	Christopher Yates
Yuratei	Mayumi Shou	Anna Conrich	Anna Conrich	Alissa Hunnicutt
Taiha	Hirotaka Suzuoki	Robert Chase	Robert Chase	Jay Snyder
Aen Shi	Rei Sakuma	Mindy Lee-Raskin	Mindy Lee-Raskin	Tara Sands
Tau Shi	Youko Sasaki	Laurel Lefkow	Laurel Lefkow	Lisa Ortiz
Rockfell	Masako Katsuki	Bethan Morgan	Bethan Morgan	Suzanne Gilad
Gisou	Tesshou Genda	1-2	Stephen Lyons	Sean Schemmel
Gisou	Tesshou Genda	3-4	Robert Chase	Sean Schemmel
Saiga	Kaneto Shiozawa	Jonathan Keeble	Jonathan Keeble	Michael Sinterniklaas
Ritsu	Shou Hayami	Robert Chase	Robert Chase	Kevin T. Collins
Lurahn	Mahito Tsujimura	1-2	Tom Alexander	Mike Pollock
Lurahn	Mahito Tsujimura	3-4	Peter Marinker	Mike Pollock
Masaki Kihara	Toshihiko Seki	David Jarvis	David Jarvis	Paul Juhn

=== Release ===
Central Park Media licensed Hades Project Zeorymer in 1995 on LaserDisc through Image Entertainment It was first released on DVD through NuTech Digital in 2001. Following the end of NuTech's distribution contract, Zeorymer was re-released by CPM in 2003 with both Japanese and English versions.

In Japan, Hades Project Zeorymer was released on Blu-ray by Bandai Visual (under the Honneamise label) on October 24, 2008.

== Merchandise ==
An action figure of Zeorymer of the Heavens was released by Yamato Toys in 2007. Bandai released Zeorymer in the Super Robot Chogokin toy line in 2012. In 2022, Good Smile Company released model kits of Zeorymer and Great Zeorymer as part of the Moderoid line.

== In other media ==
Zeorymer was featured in the 2004 game Super Robot Wars MX for the PlayStation 2.

== Reception ==
The Encyclopedia of Science Fiction criticized Hades Project Zeorymer for attempting to compress an overly complex narrative into its four episodes, resulting in an incoherent plot, rushed conclusion and underdeveloped characterization. It highlighted the series' exploration of identity through its nine clones of the same individual, each possessing different psychological traits and motivations, but argued that these potentially interesting themes required considerably more time to develop. Although it found several of the characters potentially sympathetic, the encyclopedia considered their portrayal too simplistic. It also regarded the mecha battles and animation as adequate but largely unmemorable, apart from the design of the Tekkoryu fortress. Comparing the series with director Toshihiro Hirano's earlier OVA Fight! Iczer One, it concluded that the latter handled similar material more successfully.
