= John Vargas =

American actor

- Born: The Bronx, New York, U.S.
- Occupation: Actor

John Vargas is an American actor best known for his roles in the films Primary Colors and Star Trek II: The Wrath of Khan.

== Early life ==
John Vargas was born in the Bronx and moved to Puerto Rico when his father Juan A. Maldonado was killed in Laos during the Vietnam War.

== Career ==
John Vargas was cast in Neil Simon's film Only When I Laugh, with Marsha Mason and James Coco. The following year, he featured in the film Star Trek II: The Wrath of Khan in the role of Jedda, and then joined the cast of ABC's At Ease, becoming one of the first Latino actors to star in an American television sitcom.

Vargas also appeared as Oliviera in The Hanoi Hilton.

Vargas joined the ensemble cast of the film Primary Colors, directed by Academy Award-winning director Mike Nichols, and starring John Travolta, Emma Thompson and Kathy Bates.

The following year, Vargas was cast in the role of Asher, the eurotrash maitre d' in the Fox comedy series Action, starring Jay Mohr and Illeana Douglas.

John Vargas has worked on several soap operas. He joined the cast of General Hospital in the role of Rico Chacone, and Santa Barbara as Marcos Llamera. In 2004, John was cast as Dr. Rojas in the soap opera Days of Our Lives. He also appeared in season 4, episode 11 of Star Trek: Voyager. He played Pierson in the Sliders episode "A Current Affair" (1999).

== Filmography ==
- Only When I Laugh (1981) - Manuel
- Star Trek II: The Wrath of Khan (1982) - Jedda
- My Tutor (1983) - Manuel
- Mass Appeal (1984) - Scott Alvarez
- Wildcats (1986) - Poolhall Man #3
- The Hanoi Hilton (1987) - Oliviera
- Last Stand at Lang Mei (1989) - Pvt. Wolfdreamer
- Sunset Park (1996) - Mr. Santiago
- In Dark Places (1997) - Karl
- Primary Colors (1998) - Lorenzo Delgado
- The Minus Man (1999) - Priest
- Largo (2000) - Lucky Moreno
- Across the Line (2000) - Alvarez
- Zoolander (2001) - Italian Designer
- The Commission (2003) - Loran Hall
- Charlotta-TS (2010) - Father Juan
- The Lost One (2015) - Gypsy
- Airstream (2016) - Lex
