= The Guyver =

1991 science fiction superhero film

- VHS cover
- Directed by: Screaming Mad George; Steve Wang (assistant)
- Screenplay by: Jon Purdy
- Based on: Bio Booster Armor Guyver by Yoshiki Takaya
- Produced by: Brian Yuzna
- Starring: Mark Hamill; Vivian Wu; Jack Armstrong; Jimmie Walker; David Gale
- Cinematography: Levie Isaacks
- Edited by: Andy Horvitch; Joe Woo Jr.
- Music by: Matthew Morse
- Distributed by: New Line Cinema (United States); Imperial Entertainment (international)
- Release date: March 18, 1991
- Running time: 93 minutes
- Countries: Japan; United States
- Language: English
- Budget: $3 million

The Guyver (released in Europe and South America as Mutronics) is a 1991 science fiction tokusatsu superhero film directed by Screaming Mad George and Steve Wang, and produced by Brian Yuzna. Loosely based on the Japanese manga series of the same name by Yoshiki Takaya, the film was produced in conjunction with Shochiku Films; the film stars Mark Hamill, Vivian Wu, Jack Armstrong, Jimmie Walker, and David Gale. The film is an international co-production between Japan and the United States.

The Guyver follows a young man, Sean Barker (Jack Armstrong), who discovers an alien artifact called "The Unit" which transforms him into an alien-hybrid super soldier called "The Guyver". Barker learns that a major corporation known as Chronos is after the Guyver unit, and soon discovers that the company seeks to genetically engineer monsters. The film was met with a mixed reaction from critics and fans. A sequel followed in 1994 called Guyver: Dark Hero.

== Plot ==
Dr. Tetsu Segawa, a researcher for the corporation Chronos, is on the run after having stolen an alien device known as The Guyver unit from Chronos. He is caught by Lisker, the right-hand man of the president of Chronos, and his thugs. Lisker transforms into a Zoanoid and he kills Segawa, who was also a Zoanoid. He returns the metal briefcase to Chronos' president, Fulton Balcus, only to discover that it contains an old toaster, Segawa having hid the unit in a pile of trash before he was caught. At a dojo, Max Reed, a CIA agent, notifies Dr. Segawa's daughter, Mizuki, about the incident, while her boyfriend, Sean Barker, struggles to pay attention in class. Sean follows Reed and Mizuki to the crime scene; there, he stumbles upon the Guyver unit stored, and stuffs it in his backpack. On his way home, his scooter breaks down in the middle of a back alley, and a gang corners him. While Sean is being attacked by the gang, the Guyver activates and fuses with him. Sean, in his newly armored form, dispatches the gang members, but is shocked by his physical appearance, until the armor quickly disappears into two scars on the back of his neck.

The next night, Sean goes to Mizuki's apartment, and discovers his sensei murdered and Mizuki abducted by Lisker's thugs. With the help of Reed, Sean rescues Mizuki, before the trio are chased by Lisker's gang of Zoanoids. They are trapped in an abandoned warehouse, where Lisker's thugs hold Mizuki captive, and Sean once again transforms into the Guyver to battle them. Sean defeats the Zoanoids before squaring off against Lisker. During the battle, Sean executes a headbutt, which temporarily malfunctions the armor's Control Metal. Now knowing his weakness Lisker and the others attempt to attack the Control Metal to beat Sean. During the fight, Sean kills Lisker's girlfriend, Weber, but he mistakenly believes he killed Mizuki as well. The Zoanoids gang up on him, and Lisker rips the Control Metal off his forehead, disintegrating the armor into liquid, and killing Sean in the process.

Mizuki wakes up at the Chronos headquarters, where Balcus shows her a gallery of Zoanoids, before questioning her on how Sean was able to activate the Guyver. Dr. East, the head of genetics research, discovers that the Control Metal is regenerating itself into a new Guyver unit. After seeing Reed being experimented on, Mizuki assaults Balcus and takes the Control Metal, threatening to throw it into a disposal chamber. The Control Metal begins attaching itself to her hand, preventing it from being dropped in the disposal chamber. M.C. Striker, one of Lisker's goons, inadvertently flings the Control Metal off of Mizuki's hand, and it is accidentally swallowed by Dr. East. Lisker tries to retrieve it, but East begins to frantically spasm, then dies after being cut open from the inside. A newly alive Sean bursts through East's body, as the Guyver unit is actually able to not just regenerate itself, but its host as well. Sean and Mizuki free Reed from the experimental chamber, and Sean once again battles Lisker and kills him, as well as the other Zoanoids. Before the trio proceed to escape, Reed suddenly mutates into a cockroach-esque Zoanoid, but dies due to his system rejecting the new form. Balcus demands Sean hand over the unit, but he can not as he has permanently bonded with it. Balcus reveals his true form as the Zoalord and corners Sean, but the Guyver's defensive system activates the Mega Smasher Cannon on his chest, and obliterates Balcus and the laboratory. Sean deactivates the Guyver armor before he and Mizuki leave Chronos headquarters as Reed's former partner Col. Castle and Striker look on.

== Cast ==
- Jack Armstrong as Sean Barker / The Guyver
- Mark Hamill as CIA Agent Max Reed
- Vivian Wu as Mizuki Segawa
- David Gale as Fulton Balcus
- Michael Berryman as Oswald Lisker
- Jimmie Walker as M.C. Striker
- Peter Spellos as Ramsey
- Spice Williams-Crosby as Weber
- Willard E. Pugh as Colonel Castle
- Jeffrey Combs as Dr. East
- David Wells as Dr. Gordon
- Linnea Quigley as Scream Queen
- Greg Paik as Dr. Tetsu Segawa

== Production ==
Bandai and Hero Communications approached Screaming Mad George to do the effects work for the film based on his work in A Nightmare on Elm Street 4: The Dream Master; George agreed on the condition he could direct and brought along with him producer Brian Yuzna and fellow effects artist Steve Wang. Yuzna was brought on board at Japanese companies' request as they wanted someone with industry experience to supervise George and Wang who were both relatively inexperienced, with Wang's most notable credit being providing the make-up effects for Hell Comes to Frogtown. George and Wang completed the movie's principal photography in five weeks, beginning in October 1990, shooting on locations in Simi Valley and Los Angeles. The two began directing side by side before splitting up into separate units with Wang responsible for handling the majority of the film's action scenes. George said of the production:

The animated version of Guyver is a lot more serious and meant for adults. It had a lot of gory violence and adult themes. As we got into script development, we realized that with the budget and schedule we had to shoot the movie, we'd probably be better off making it for a broader audience, like a PG-13.

Filming took place from October through December of 1990.

== Release ==
The American version of the film, distributed by New Line, cut several scenes to focus more on action than humor. Producer Yuzna expressed confusion at some of the choices.

The film was given a direct-to-video release on October 28, 1992.

== Reception ==
Glenn Kenny of Entertainment Weekly said the film features "surprisingly convincing costumes and effects, inspired casting, and energetic direction, [but] what sinks it is its unfortunate adherence to the time-honored direct-to-video clichés: an unearned paycheck for a onetime A-picture star, and a tendency to fall back on lame humor whenever the going gets slow."

David Johnson of DVD Verdict criticized the film's "ham-fisted over-acting", "ludicrous plot contrivances", and "nauseatingly hokey soundtrack." Johnson called the film "a big, dumb joke" and said: "Despite some good creature effects, the movie crashed and burned and crashed again, weighted down by preposterous acting [and] corny music."

Nathan Shumate of Cold Fusion Video Reviews criticized the film, in particular "the annoying demeanor and lack of personality" of lead actor Jack Armstrong, adding: "If there ever was a movie made for fan appreciation only, this is it, [...] but not everything can be blamed on audience unfamiliarity; there are plenty of elements in this movie that don't work even by fanboy standards."

The film generated enough interest for a sequel, Guyver: Dark Hero. Armstrong was replaced by David Hayter in the role of Sean. The film was more well-received critically than its predecessor.

While Brian Yuzna had mixed feelings about the final film feeling the commercial viability of The Guyver was hampered by having two directors whose work on the film didn't necessarily align into a cohesive whole, the Japanese backers on the film were pleased with the results and asked Yuzna to approach some other anime based properties. When producer Samuel Hadida, who'd distributed The Guyver in French territories, learned Yuzna had the rights to Crying Freeman this led to the two of them teaming upon on a film adaptation which had been a long sought after passion project for Hadida.

== See also ==
- Iron Man
- RoboCop
- Max Steel
