= The Guyver: Bio-Booster Armor =

Japanese original video animation

- DVD cover of US release
- 強殖装甲ガイバー; Kyōshoku Sōkō Gaibā
- Type: OVA
- Genre: Action, science fiction
- Based on: Bio Booster Armor Guyver
- Created by: Yoshiki Takaya
- Directed by: Koichi Ishiguro (1–6); Yasuo Yamayoshi (7–8) (Note: Recalled Version (回収版) episodes.); Masahiro Ōtani (7–8); Naoto Hashimoto (7–12)
- Series composition: Takaya Production (1–6) (Note: Also episodes 7–8 of the Recalled Version (回収版).)
- Screenplay by: Riku Sanjo (1–6); Motonori Tachikawa (7–12)
- Character designer: Hidetoshi Oomori
- Music by: Eiji Kawamura; Reijiro Koroku
- No. of seasons: 2
- No. of episodes: 12 + 2 (Note: 12 episodes and 2 Recalled Version (回収版) episodes serving as the original episode 7 and episode 8 of the series. Due to poor animation quality, the episodes were redone.)

Production
- Art directors: Junichi Higashi (1–6); Masuo Nakayama (7–10, 12); Kenichi Harada (8, 11)
- Sound director: Jun Watanabe (sound director)
- Cinematographers: Seiichi Morishita (1–6); Motoaki Ikegami (7); Sadafumi Sano (8); Kazunori Hashimoto (9); Yousuke Moriguchi (10)
- Color designer: Yoshinobu Nakamura (1–6)
- Editors: Takeshi Seyama (1–6); Hiroshi Adachi (2–6); Ikuo Ookusa (7–8); Tadahito Sata (7–10); Kazuo Inoue (11–12)
- Animation producers: Seiichi Hirano (1–6); Yasuo Kageyama (1–6); Yoshiyuki Yamamoto (7) (Note: Episode 7 of the remake version, and episodes 7–8 of the Recalled Version (回収版).)
- Studios: Visual 80 (1–6); Hero Communications (7–12)
- Producers: Nagateru Katou (1–6); Katsutoshi Sasaki (7–8); Osamu Shimizu (7–12)
- Production companies: Bandai; Kamakura Super Station; Movic
- Runtime: 30 minutes

Original release
- Release: September 25, 1989 – August 21, 1992

The Guyver: Bio-Booster Armor (Japanese: 強殖装甲ガイバー, Hepburn: Kyōshoku Sōkō Gaibā) is a Japanese original video animation (OVA) series loosely based on Yoshiki Takaya's manga Bio Booster Armor Guyver. It was released in Japan from 1989 to 1992. It is the second animated adaptation, following the 1986 OVA Guyver: Out of Control.

== Plot ==
Divided into two series, this OVA series tells a condensed version of the first five volumes.

=== Differences between manga and OVA ===
Though the series follows the manga much more closely than the original OVA, Guyver: Out of Control, there are still some significant differences between the manga and this OVA series. The main characters were included and the general feeling of manga plot are still there. The series of events that happen are where the major differences occur, as well as character appearances. An example was the appearance of Vamore; in the OVA he appeared immediately after Guyver I had defeated Gregole, in contrast to the manga where he appeared during the first kidnapping of Tetsuro. The Hyper Zoanoid Team 5 were also introduced much earlier than in the manga. In fact, an entire sequence of the team attacking Sho's school was added in as well as a battle between the two Guyvers and the team in the Chronos headquarters.

== US Release ==
The OVA series was first released in the United States by U.S. Renditions in 1992. L.A. Hero, which released the first OVA, Guyver: Out of Control, provided the translation. It was released on 6 VHS tapes dubbed in English. All tapes had two episodes per tape with the first part of the series on the first three tapes and the second part on the last three tapes.

After U.S. Renditions rights expired, the series was later picked up by Manga Entertainment and released one episode per VHS. They later condensed the series onto two DVDs with each series on a separate DVD. The DVDs featured both English and Japanese audio tracks.

Although much of the original audio tracks for the English dubbing were kept from the U.S. Rendition version, there were some minor edits to the videos. The opening intro was slightly edited and gray boxes with English credits were placed over the original credits that were in Japanese, though unedited introductions were included in the special features. Some of the voices were re-dubbed. The final episode was also edited, mainly the nudity was removed. However, an unedited version of this episode was included in the special features, with Japanese audio only (the episode was available uncut with English audio for the US Renditions releases previously).

== Cast ==
=== Voice Actors (Japan) ===
- Takeshi Kusao: Shō Fukamachi/Guyver I
- Yuko Mizutani: Mizuki Segawa
- Kōzō Shioya: Tetsurō Segawa
- Hideyuki Tanaka: Agito Makishima/Guyver III
- Chieko Honda: Natsuki Taga
- Jun Hazumi: Genzō Makishima/Enzyme
- Kōji Totani: Gregole
- Ken Yamaguchi: Vamore
- Norio Wakamoto: Oswald A. Lisker/Guyver II
- Kōichi Yamadera: Zerbebuth
- Hidekatsu Shibata: Richard Guyot
- Masashi Hironaka: Thancrus
- Banjō Ginga: Gaster
- Daisuke Gōri: Derzerb
- Juurouta Kosugi: Elegen
- Ikuya Sawaki: ZX-Tole
- Hirotaka Suzuoki: Masaki Murakami
- Yutaka Shimaka: Fumio Fukamachi
- Seizō Katō: Dr. Hamilcar Barcas
- Maria Kawamura: Shizu Onuma
- Kenichi Ogata: Yōhei Onuma
- Issei Futamata: Aptom

=== Voice Actors (English) ===
- David Hart: Narrator (series I)/Genzo Makishima
- Hal Cleaveland: Narrator (series II)
- Tom Fahn: Shō Fukamachi/Guyver I, Malmont
- Melissa Fahn: Mizuki Segawa
- Víctor García: Tetsuro Segawa, Truck Driver
- Steven Jay Blum: Agito Makishima/Guyver III, Zancrus
- Gary Michaels: Oswald A. Lisker/Guyver II, Zector, Aptom
- Bill Kestin: Rehalt Guou
- Debra Rogers: Natsuki Taga/Mizusawa/Shizu
- Steve Areno: Masaki Murakami
- Sonny Byrkett: Dr. Balcus/Fumio Fukamachi
- Mimi Woods: Newscaster
- Susan Byrkett: Secretary
- Dan Lorge: Zerebubus, Takasato, Darzerb, Mr. Onuma, Additional voices
- Yutaka Maseba: Additional voices
- Lee West: Additional voices
- Bob Sessions: Genzo Makishima (Manga UK Version)
- Stuart Milligan: Zector (Manga UK Version)

== Theme songs ==
- Opening Theme - "Bio Booster Armor Guyver" - Shinichi Ishihara (Episodes 1–12)
- Ending Theme 1 -"Guidepost -Alien's Messiah" (道標 -異形の天使-) - Shinichi Ishihara (Episodes 1–6)
- Ending Theme 2 - "Guyver!! Another Me" (GUYVER!!～もう一人の俺～) - Katsumi Yamaura (Episodes 07–12)

== Episode list ==
Part 1 (1989–1990)

- Data 1: Genesis of the Guyver (September 25, 1989)
- Data 2: Battle of the Guyvers (October 25, 1989)
- Data 3: Mysterious Shadow - Guyver III (November 25, 1989)
- Data 4: Attack of the Hyper Zoanoid - Team 5 (December 16, 1989)
- Data 5: Death of the Guyver (January 25, 1990)
- Data 6: Terminal Battle - The Fall of Chronos Japan (February 25, 1990)

Part 2 (1992)

- Data 7: The Battle Begins (February 20, 1992)
- Data 8: The Lost Unit (February 20, 1992)
- Data 9: Transformation Tragedy (May 21, 1992)
- Data 10: Haunted Village (May 21, 1992)
- Data 11: The Beastmaster (August 21, 1992)
- Data 12: Reactivation (August 21, 1992)
