= Screaming Mad George =

Japanese-American artist and director (1956–2026)

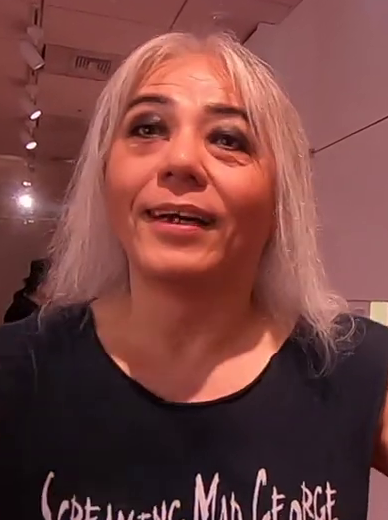
- Screaming Mad George in 2019
- Born: Joji Tani; October 7, 1956; Osaka, Japan
- Died: February 10, 2026 (aged 69)
- Occupations: Special effects artist, film director
- Notable work: Society, The Guyver, Freaked

Joji Tani (Japanese: 谷譲治, Hepburn: Tani Jōji), known as Screaming Mad George (October 7, 1956 – February 10, 2026), was a Japanese special effects artist, film director and musician. He was born in Osaka, Japan, and emigrated to the United States, where he became known for his surreal, grotesque and gory special effects. He collaborated with director and producer Brian Yuzna on many films.

== Background ==
Born Joji Tani in Osaka, Japan on October 7, 1956, he took the first name George in order to stand out. Upon emigrating to the United States, where he graduated from the School of Visual Arts, he changed his name to Screaming Mad George in order to distinguish himself among the other Georges in an Anglophone country. The moniker was influenced by his love for Mad Magazine and Screamin' Jay Hawkins.

== Career ==
George began as a punk rock musician and played with the late 1970s band The Mad. His gory music videos led to a job in the film industry, where he worked on special make-up effects. His early work includes effects on Big Trouble in Little China (1986), Predator (1987), A Nightmare on Elm Street 3: Dream Warriors (1987), the cockroach scene in A Nightmare on Elm Street 4: The Dream Master (1988), and Arena (1989). In 1989 he returned to his home country of Japan to direct the special effects for Tokyo: The Last War, a big budget follow up to the dark fantasy blockbuster Tokyo: The Last Megalopolis. In 1989 he also began a long-term collaboration with director Brian Yuzna with Society. In a negative review, Variety called the film's SFX-laden climax "sickening", and the Austin Chronicle called the effects "cheesy". In more positive reviews, the Los Angeles Times called George the real star of the film, and Empire wrote, "Yuzna and his veteran special effects man Screaming Mad George serve up this literal slime with such verve, wit and overall verbal and visual flair that the movie also stands as one of the very finest of teen comedies."

In a 1990 follow-up with Yuzna, George provided special effects for Silent Night, Deadly Night 4: Initiation (1990) that Variety called "imaginative" and "just what modern horror fans crave". In 1991, he made his directorial debut with The Guyver, which he co-directed with Steve Wang. Yuzna produced the film. In America, the film was recut by New Line to remove some of the humor and focus more on action. Entertainment Weekly rated the film "C" and said that while the effects were good, the film was too clichéd. The Los Angeles Times called his creature effects in Freaked (1993) "terrific", and Ain't It Cool News said that George's work was the best reason to watch the film. In 1993, he returned to music releasing the album Transmutation under Extasy Records with a group called Screaming Mad George & Psychosis.

Witney Seibold of CraveOnline wrote of Children of the Corn III: Urban Harvest (1995), "Any character that this film has is due to [George]." Stuart Gordon chose George to perform special effects in Space Truckers (1996) based on his previous work and his ability to speak Japanese, as creature designer Hajime Sorayama wanted to be involved in the film's production. Variety was warm toward his effects in Tales from the Hood (1995) and Progeny (1998). He teamed up again with Yuzna in Faust: Love of the Damned (2000) and Beyond Re-Animator (2003).

== Personal life and death ==
George had a wife, Miki, and one daughter.

On August 16, 2026, his family announced through his official Instagram account that he had died on February 10, four days after suffering a cardiac arrest. He was 69. The family said the announcement had been delayed as "a deeply personal choice to allow our family the necessary time and space to process the shock, heal and hold space in complete privacy."

== Awards ==
Year	Organization	Award	For	Result	Ref
1994	Academy of Science Fiction, Fantasy and Horror Films	Best Make-up	Freaked	Nominated	
2001	DVD Exclusive Awards	Best Visual Effects	Faust: Love of the Damned	Nominated	

== Filmography ==
=== Makeup and special effects ===
- Big Trouble in Little China (1986)
- Predator (1987)
- A Nightmare on Elm Street 3: Dream Warriors (1987)
- Don't Panic (1987)
- A Nightmare on Elm Street 4: The Dream Master (1988)
- Hide and Go Shriek (1988)
- Arena (1989)
- Curse II: The Bite (1989)
- Society (1989)
- Tokyo: The Last War (1989)
- The Abyss (1989)
- Bride of Re-Animator (1990)
- Silent Night, Deadly Night 4: Initiation (1990)
- Silent Night, Deadly Night 5: The Toy Maker (1991)
- The Guyver (1991)
- Freaked (1993)
- Children of the Corn III: Urban Harvest (1995)
- Tales from the Hood (1995)
- Space Truckers (1996)
- Progeny (1998)
- Faust: Love of the Damned (2000)
- Blood of the Samurai (2001)
- Beyond Re-Animator (2003)

=== Director ===
- The Guyver (1991)

=== Video game work ===
- Screaming Mad George's ParanoiaScape (1998)

== Discography ==
=== Musician ===
- Eyeball (1978, The Mad)
- Fried Egg (1980, The Mad)
- Transmutation (1993, Screaming Mad George & Psychosis)

=== Effects ===
- X Japan – Jealousy front cover concept, mask, make up (1991)
- Seikima-II – Kyōfu no Restaurant front cover concept (1992)
- hide – Hide Your Face mask (1994)
- Marilyn Manson – Omēga's make up (Mechanical Animals, 1998)
- Slipknot – masks (Iowa and Vol. 3: (The Subliminal Verses))

== Bibliography ==
- Room, Adrian (2011). Dictionary of Pseudonyms (Fifth ed.). McFarland & Company. ISBN 9780786457632.
- Fischer, Dennis (2010). Science Fiction Film Directors, 1895-1998. McFarland & Company. ISBN 9780786485055.
- Paszylk, Bartlomiej (2009). The Pleasure and Pain of Cult Horror Films: An Historical Survey. McFarland & Company. ISBN 9780786453276.
- Prouty, Howard H., ed. (1994). Variety and Daily Variety TV Reviews, 1991–1992. Taylor & Francis. ISBN 9780824037963.
