= Bio Booster Armor Guyver =

Japanese manga

- First volume of the Viz release

強殖装甲ガイバー (Kyōshoku Sōkō Gaibā)
- Manga
- Written by: Yoshiki Takaya
- Published by: Tokuma Shoten (1985 – 1997); Kadokawa Shoten (1998 – present)
- Imprint: Shōnen Captain Comics (1986 – 1997); Kadokawa Comics Ace (1998 – present)
- Magazine: Shōnen Captain (1985 – 1997); Monthly Ace Next (1999 – 2002); Shōnen Ace (2007 – 2016)
- Original run: February 18, 1985 – June 3, 2016 (Note: The manga was put on an indefinite hiatus following its last released chapter on June 3, 2016. In 2026, author Yoshiki Takaya gave an update in the Blu-Ray release of Guyver: Dark Hero stating that he believes he will be unable to continue the manga due to a cerebral infarction.)
- Volumes: 32
- Original video animation

Guyver: Out of Control
- Directed by: Hiroshi Watanabe
- Produced by: Nagateru Kato; Takao Asaga; Toyoo Ashida
- Written by: Toyoo Ashida (Note: Credited under his penname Monta Ibu (伊武紋太).)
- Music by: Tadashi Namba
- Studio: Studio Live
- Licensed by: Dark Image Entertainment
- Released: December 13, 1986
- Runtime: 55 minutes
- Anime
- The Guyver: Bio-Booster Armor (OVA series); Guyver: The Bioboosted Armor (TV series)
- Live-action films
- The Guyver (1991); Guyver: Dark Hero (1994)
- icon

Bio-Booster Armor Guyver (Japanese: 強殖装甲ガイバー, Hepburn: Kyōshoku Sōkō Gaibā) or simply Guyver is a Japanese manga series written and illustrated by Yoshiki Takaya. The Guyver itself is a symbiotic techno-organic (or biomechanical) device that enhances the capabilities of its host.

The manga was originally serialized in Tokuma Shoten's Monthly Shōnen Captain from February 1985 until its discontiuation in January 1997. The manga was picked up by Kadokawa Shoten, and was serialized in Monthly Ace Next magazine from 1999 until its discontinuation in April 2002. The manga is irregularly serialized in Kadokawa's Monthly Shōnen Ace magazine since February 2007, with its latest chapter released in June 2016 before going on indefinite hiatus. It has been licensed by Viz Media, Star Comics and Chuang Yi Publishing.

Guyver has been adapted into a single OVA titled Guyver: Out of Control (1986, based loosely on the first volume), a 12-episode anime OVA series (1989 to 1992, based on the first four volumes), two American tokusatsu live action movies (1991's The Guyver and 1994's Guyver: Dark Hero) as well as a 26-episode anime series (2005 to 2006, based on the first ten volumes). There was also a novel released in 1989 and two light novels in 1995.

== Plot ==
A test type Zoanoid escapes from the Cronos Corporation with three Guyver Units. Cronos soldiers pursue the test type into some woods to recover the units from him, but when they corner the test type, he detonates a bomb he had with him. The Guyver Units are scattered in the blast. One of the lost Guyver Units, known as "Unit I", lands near two young high school students, Shō Fukamachi and Tetsurō Segawa. The second one is retrieved by Cronos and merges with Oswald A. Lisker to become the second Guyver later on. The final unit falls into the hands of Agito Makishima, who merges with it at an unspecified time. Shō accidentally activates the unit which then painfully merges with him.

Over time, Shō learns more about the Guyver and its abilities. The Guyver is virtually invulnerable, with its only weak point being the Control Metal. With this part intact, it can rebuild the host from their data it stores within, but if this part is critically damaged, the host will be eaten alive by the unit and perish. This is disconcerting and Shō starts to question whether he will ever be free from the Guyver. The situation gets worse with the fact that Cronos is continuously sending more and more powerful Zoanoids to retrieve the Guyver. This makes it increasingly difficult for Shō to protect his vulnerable friends.

As the story progresses it also takes a startling turn, in which Cronos succeeds in taking over the world and reshaping it according to its ideals. The Guyvers are then labeled to the public as a "vanguard of alien invaders".

== Characters ==
Shō Fukamachi (深町 晶, Fukamachi Shō) / Guyver I
The main protagonist of the series, Shō is seventeen years old and a second-year student at Narisawa high school. He has black hair and a slim build. He fights Cronos to protect his friends and family than from any need to see the enemy brought to justice. Had he not become host for a Guyver Unit, he would have happily continued in ignorance of Cronos. He cares deeply for Mizuki Segawa with the intensity of first love and Tetsuro Segawa, Mizuki's older brother, is his closest friend. As he is the host for the first Unit activated, he is known as "Guyver I". Shō later obtains a larger, more powerful Guyver Unit known as "Guyver Gigantic" after interfacing with a Creator ship. The Guyver Gigantic can be further enhanced into "Guyver Gigantic Exceed," enlarging to roughly 52 meters in height and changing the armor color to red.
Tetsurō Segawa (瀬川 哲郎, Segawa Tetsurō)
A large-framed, chubby third-year student, Tetsuro is Shō's closest friend and Mizuki's older brother. He is highly intelligent and can think rapidly when he has to. He is a rabid science fiction fan and the leader of the sci-fi society in the school, which gives him the background knowledge to make numerous accurate guesses about the Guyver armor, Zoanoids and Cronos. He wears his hair short and has glasses.
Mizuki Segawa (瀬川 瑞紀, Segawa Mizuki)
Mizuki is a typical schoolgirl who is the younger sister of Tetsurō. At the beginning of the story, she has a crush on Agito Makishima, but later begins to appreciate Shō more. She is short, very slender and wears her hair in a page-boy cut that emphasizes her large eyes.
Agito Makishima (巻島 顎人, Makishima Agito) / Guyver III
Agito is of medium build and muscular; he is a third-year student at the same high school the others attend, but looks older. Portrayed as an anti-hero, he almost never allows sentiment to stand in his way. He appears shrewd and calculating. At one point a candidate-member of the Cronos Elite, he is now viewed by them as a traitor. Even though he may have activated his Unit before Oswald A. Lisker, the second Guyver, he did not openly appear in his Guyver armor until after Lisker was eliminated and thus he was dubbed "Guyver III". Agito shows a frightening knowledge of what the Guyver can do throughout the series. After the Cronos conquest, Agito leads a resistance organization known as "Zeus No Ikazuchi" or "Zeus' Thunderbolts", as he plans to overthrow Cronos and steal their power (as the god Zeus did to his father, Cronos). By exerting his willpower, Agito has the ability to summon the Guyver Gigantic armor even if Shō is already using it. When Agito uses the Guyver Gigantic, it changes form to resemble Guyver III, becoming "Guyver Gigantic Dark." After Shō permanently claims ownership of the original Guyver Gigantic, Agito obtains his own personal Unit.
Shizu Onuma (尾沼志津, Onuma Shizu) / Griselda
Shizu Onuma and her family have been serving the Makishima family for many years, tending to their properties and caring for Agito in his youth. Although she is by nature kind and gentle, she can be extremely dangerous when she is acting in his interests since her devotion to him is total and overriding any other consideration. She gave her body to the ambition of Agito and leads the processed "Liberatus" of the Zeus' Thunderbolts organization, having been transformed into the proto-zoalord Griselda. She capable of protecting the Liberatus from the psychic control of Cronos' overlords, although her lifespan has been greatly diminished by the transformation.
Fumio Fukamachi (深町 史雄, Fukamachi Fumio)
Fumio is a widower and Shō's father, but almost nothing else is known about him. He is captured and used by Cronos as a guinea pig and turned into a Guyver-killer Zoanoid to entrap Shō. He ends up being killed by Guyver I in battle.
Aptom (アプトム, Aputomu)
He is a battle creature that hunts down other Zoanoids created by Cronos (except Lost Numbers). By absorbing small amounts of DNA from other Zoanoids, he can replicate their forms and powers, as well as mix the attributes of several Zoanoids in one body. He can regenerate himself even if only small pieces of him are left. Since discovering this ability, he begins killing Zoanoids to take their powers and bio-matter in order to become the most powerful battle creature and becomes a renegade from Cronos. In time, he comes to ally himself with the Guyvers in various battles. Aptom was one of the lost number commandos along with his two compatriots, Somlum and Dyme, who were killed in battle with Guyver I. This leads Aptom to carry a vendetta against Shō. Over time, Aptom questions his own motives and considers Cronos' part in his suffering. He was originally developed as a Zoanoid with the ability to morph into different types of Zoanoids and possess the power of the types he morphs into, but the project failed and he became a Lost Number. Dr. Barcus was interested in Aptom's abilities and carried out further experiments on him. This freed Aptom from the mental control of the Zoalords and gave him the ability to rapidly evolve. Aptom also has other unexpected abilities, including the ability to regenerate himself even from the smallest remaining piece of his tissue and the ability to clone himself, each clone having its own consciousness. Throughout the story, he has gone through several different chosen forms after absorbing multiple Zoanoids. His human shape is of a muscular man with a distinctive scar that runs down the left side of his face from hairline to jaw. He often dresses in a leather jacket, jeans and sunglasses.
Toshiaki Hayami (速水利章, Hayami Toshiaki) / Bio-Freezer (バイオ·フリーザー, Baio Furīzā)
One of Dr. Odagiri's assistants, and the one who manipulated security footage at the Relic's Point base to cover Agito Makishima sneeking Shō Fukamachi and Mizuki Segawa in. He is later the sole survivor of that group of scientists that escaped in the relic, along with the Segawa siblings and Agito Makishima's aids, after the destruction of the Relic's point base. The scientists were infected by a deadly virus as Cronos' means of keeping them under control. The only way to escape death is to be supplied with regular shots or to become Zoanoids. The only way to become a Zoanoid and yet not be slaves to the Zoalords is to become a Lost Number. Since supplies of the medicine were running out, they resorted to attempt to becoming Lost Numbers. Hayami was the only scientist that survived the process, becoming "Bio-Freezer". He possesses the unique power to affect the temperature of the environment around him to a certain extent. Aptom finds him and, once he realizes what Hayami is, brings him to meet the Guyvers and their friends. Unfortunately, later on his mission with Sho to save Aptom from the three rogue Zoalords, he sacrifices himself to save the latter, knowing that he was going to die anyway, due to flaws in the make-shift optimization process, passing his powers on-to Aptom.
Valkyria Forsberg-Lisker (ヴァルキュリア・フォーシュバリ・リスカー) / Guyver II Female
Valkyria is a former member of Cronos and the step-sister of the late Oswald A. Lisker. Her mother was Astrid Forsberg and her stepfather was US Senator Robert P. Lisker. Their marriage was arranged by Cronos to unite the powerful American and Swedish Cronos families together. Robert was quite cold to Valkyria, but initially Oswald acted like a big brother to her. After her mother's death she came to resent the submissive role she had been dealt and proceeded to work her way up the ranks of Cronos to avoid being used as a pawn the way her mother was. Her goal to show up her brother was destroyed upon his death, shattering her. She steals a prototype artificial Guyver unit and becomes "Guyver II Female" or Guyver II-F, ultimately joining forces with former Zoalord Richard Guyot. She is plagued by bouts of fatigue and dizziness, even in human form, as a result of becoming a pseudo-Guyver. Additionally, because it is a flawed prototype, Valkyria's Guyver has a limited activation time and destroys her clothing when activated.
Valkyria is based on a character that appears in the 1986 OVA named Valcuria, who serves the same role as Oswald A. Lisker in other adaptations. Like Lisker, Valcuria bonds with a damaged Guyver unit, which becomes increasingly unstable the longer she fights. This flaw is exploited by Shō to defeat her and destroy her Control Medal, causing her armor to consume her until Shō ultimately kills her with the Mega-Smasher.
Apollon (アポルオン, Aporuon)
A mysterious figure that has begun collecting Zoacrystals from the deceased Zoalords. He appears to wear a dark armor made from the same material as Guyver's control metal. He has demonstrated mind control, an ability only seen used by Uranus or Zoalord. He also mimicked Caerleon's self-division by manipulation of 'unfolded space'. Dr Barcus has speculated that Apollon could be a vanguard of the Uranus. He also appears to be on a tight schedule. He is likely based upon apollyon. Even though the katakana is closer to Apollon, the kanji that is often used beside it is abyss.

=== Cronos ===
Genzo Makishima (巻島 玄蔵, Makishima Genzō)
Director of Cronos' Japan Branch, he is in charge when the Japan Branch loses the Guyver Units. While initially one of the people in charge of developing new Zoanoids, Genzo has, unknown to him, fallen behind in this category as well once Dr. Barcus begins designing Hyper Zoanoids, Zoanoids of highly enhanced capabilities. His failures to retrieve the Units as well as come up with any significantly new Zoanoid designs results in Commander Richart Guyot relieving him of duty. Genzo is then used as a guinea pig for the new "Enzyme" Zoanoid prototype, a Zoanoid specifically designed to destroy the Guyver Armor by dissolving it with its acid. After he retrieves Guyver I's Control Metal in battle, he is ordered by Guyot to self-destruct when the dissolving Guyver I attacks Enzyme.
Oswald A. Lisker (オズワルド·A·リスカー, Ozuwarudo Ēi Risukā) / Guyver II
An inspector from Cronos headquarters stationed in Japan to supervise the transfer of the Guyver Units. When one damaged Unit is recovered, he insists on taking a look at it and involuntarily becomes its host. As the second known activated Unit, he is called "Guyver II". An egotistical and vain man, he personally claims the responsibility of retrieving Shō's Guyver. As Guyver II, Lisker boasts more fighting skill and deeper knowledge of the Guyver's abilities than Shō, but the Unit's damaged Control Medal soon begins to malfunction under the stress of combat, incapacitating him. Shō takes advantage of this weakness, striking Guyver II directly in the forehead and causing the Control Medal to burst out of his head. Without the Control Medal to regulate it, the parasitic organism that makes up the armor immediately begins to consume Lisker's body. Horrified, Shō uses his Mega-Smasher to put Lisker out of his misery. The image of Lisker's decomposing, deformed body haunts Shō, causing him nightmares.

==== Zoalords ====
Archanfel (アルカンフェル, Arukanferu)
Quite easily the most powerful being on Earth, Archanfel appears to be a young, fair-haired man with pointy ears and cat-slit eyes. He is the founder, creator and ruler of Cronos. He is an extremely powerful psychic and possesses amazing battle abilities. Archanfel was created by "the Creators" to be the leader of all the Zoanoids and the people on Earth. The Zoacrystals that give Zoalords their powers were all cultivated using Archanfel's crystal as a base.
Quoted from book 14, page 16:
"And then... cleaving and cultivating one of Archanfel's Zoacrystals, we created eleven others. Accepting one of them, I became a Zoalord. In the centuries since then, I have searched for the ten chosen people who would become Zoalords as well."
Although powerful, he has been increasingly dormant since prehistoric days. When the Creators withdrew from Earth, they attempted to destroy it with a gigantic meteorite which was stopped by Archanfel at great cost to himself. To save himself, he is looking to gain possession of one of the Guyver Units, in-order to stabilize his condition.
Hamilcar Barcus (ハミルカル·バルカス, Hamirukaru Barukasu)
Co-founder of Cronos and the second eldest member of the Council of Twelve. He is responsible for designing and creating the first Hyper Zoanoids and completing the final work on most of the Zoalords. He is over 400 years old and is, in fact, the person who awoke Archanfel from his long slumber. He is widely believed to be the top scientist of Cronos and is said to have greater telepathic prowess than any other Zoalord, save for Archanfel. His seniority among the others has resulted in many of the Zoalords to look up at him with much respect and as such he is occasionally referred to as "Old Bal" by those closest to him.
Sinn Rubeo Amniculus (シン·ルベオ·アムニカルス, Shin Rubeo Amunikarusu)
Discovered by Barcus 370 years ago in Armenia. He is a close friend of Freidrich von Purgstall and commands Cloud Gate after his death. He is considered to be the third-in-command of Cronos after Barcus. His brief appearance as a Zoalord showcased his incredible capabilities by being able to target various missiles in long range and in all directions, then destroy them with precision.
Friedrich von Purgstall (フリドリッヒ·フォン·プルクシュタール, Furidorihhi Fon Purukushutāru)
Discovered by Barcus 215 years ago in Vienna. He generally seems to be more compassionate toward the civilian population than the other Zoalords. He is one of the weakest in close-range battle, but his lightning-based power can be formidable. Laser weapons are ineffective against him, as he can absorb and redirect the attacks. Unintended for hand-to-hand fighting, his physical defense is minimal. He was murdered by the rogue trio of Zoalords after being severely weakened from his battle with Guyver I.
Luggnagg de Krumeggnic (ラグナク·ド·クルメグニク, Rugunaku Do Kurumeguniku)
One of three rogue Zoalords out to overthrow Cronos and obtain a Guyver unit.
Cabral Khān (カブラール·ハーン, Kaburāru Hān)
A rogue Zoalord. A diminutive old man who mostly levitates with his legs crossed, Cabral's immediate ability seems to be the power to petrify a Zoanoid. It is unknown if this extends to other lifeforms. This ability seems to also entail the control of other bodies, up to thousands of them, which can then be merged to create a giant battle form. As Cabral exercises his abilities, he goes through various 'modes': brain mode, draglord mode, and extirpate mode. The brain mode serves as the nerve center for the later stages, the final of which features a huge set of wings and an enormous ranged beam weapon capable of destruction on a city-wide scale. Cablarl used his abilities to capture Aptom, luring Sho out to rescue him. Cabral controlled Aptom for a time with the use of an artificial brain implanted inside him; after Aptom was freed, he killed Cabral as revenge.
Édouard Caerleon (エドワード·カールレオン, Edowādo Kārureon)
A gentle-looking man with long curly hair. Édouard was not heavily featured in the manga (and thus had little dialogue) until Chapter 164, where he was shown to be stationed on The Ark (Cronos' habitable spaceship) guarding the three Zoacrystals that formerly belonged to Purg'stall, Waferdanos and Li Yan Tsui. Édouard is subsequently confronted by the mysterious Apollyon, who was first seen secretly retrieving the Zoacrystal of Cablarl Khān upon his death. Édouard transforms into his Zoalord battle form and engages in conflict with Apollyon, who is seeking the three Zoacrystals on the Ark. His main special Zoaform ability seems to be self division by manipulation of 'unfolded space'. Édouard is badly injured when Apollon mimics his ability and rips his Zoacrystal out of his forehead, taking it along with the other three crystals Édouard was protecting. This has left him badly withered.
Jabir Ibn Hayyan (ジャービル·ブン·ハイヤーン, Jābiru Bun Haiyān)
Another rogue. Wears a turban and has a visible Zoacrystal. Although not officially confirmed, he is believed to be named after the famous Arabic alchemist, Jabir Ibn Hayyan.
Waferdanos (ワフェルダノス, Waferudanosu)
The second Zoalord to be found by Barcus, he is the only Zoalord confirmed not to have a human origin. He is a collective formed by a living forest. The name "Waferdanos" is the name of the island or Kingdom that the creature lives on. Barcus believes him to be older than both Archanfel and the human race as well. He was a previous bio-weapon prototype abandoned by the Creators. Deceased as a result of the destruction of the Arizona headquarter with Yan Tsui.
Tuatha Dé Galenos (トゥアハ·デ·ガレノス, Tuaha De Garenosu)
Looks like a large man made of rock. He has so far only demonstrated an attack using his mouth's flaming breath to help destroy The Creators Relic. Hardly ever speaks and little is known about him. Of all the Zoalords he is the tallest as well as huskiest in appearance.
Li Yan Tui (李剡魋, Ri Entsui)
A mysterious young Chinese man with jet black hair, whose Zoalord form is a green battle creature with huge prisms on his forearms. Li Yantui uses the prisms to attack with a technique named Zue Kong Zhan (絕空斬) that seems to involve dimensional wormholes. He marks a set of coordinates and links two points in space with a window. He uses these to instantly travel from point-to-point or slice through other objects. Deceased as a result of the destruction of the Arizona headquarters along with Waferdanos as they battled Guyver III and his allies. He, along with Waferdanos, managed to protect Barcus up until their deaths and it was Li Yan Tsui who managed to allow Barcus to escape the battle. His name was romanized as Rienzi in the 1996 book Guyver: Visual Data File.
Richart Guyot (リヒャルト·ギュオー, Riharuto Gyuō)
A tall, powerfully-built man, Guyot would stand out in a crowd without his large blonde hair and abnormal eyes. He is an immensely commanding presence. Guyot has been bio-engineered into a Zoalord and was given the ability to control gravity, making him more powerful than the others, second only to Archanfel. His ultimate weapon is the "Artificial Black-Hole", which, like its name implies, creates something like a black-hole and will suck everything that surrounds it. Guyot discovered the secret of the Guyver before the other ten Zoalords (Archanfel knew this all along) and foolishly pursued it in order to merge with it and take control of Cronos. This ambition was known to Murakami, who had made it his goal to destroy Guyot. Guyot's ambition caused him to hide the device called the "Unit Remover", which he was about to use on Guyver III when Archanfel showed up and stripped him of his Zoacrystal. He has recently been shown to be alive and working with the rogue Zoalords. He was reprocessed into a proto-zoalord, fulfilling the reversal between him and Murakami. It appears that he has successfully recruited Guyver II-F to their cause. It is likely that his name is derived from the geological formations known as guyots, as there are instances of these having strange gravity anomalies surrounding them. In the Viz Media translations, his name is translated as "Reichmann Gyro".
Imakarum Mirabilis (イマカラム·ミラービリス, Imakaramu Mirābirisu) / Masaki Murakami (村上征樹, Murakami Masaki)
Masaki was a freelance journalist captured by Cronos and used as an experimental guinea pig in the Zoalord development program. He is a prototype body for the Zoalord form of Richart Guyot. He joins with Shō to fight Cronos. When combating the Zoanoids in his human form, he uses a massive revolver called a Zoanoid Buster. After Guyot mortally wounds him, Archanfel retrieves Masaki's body. Murakami is turned into an obedient, powerful Cronos general—and a full Zoalord, who assumes the name "Imakarum Mirabilis" to take the place of the fallen Guyot. When his obedience is questioned, Barcus explains that Imakarum Mirabilis has a unique relationship with Archanfel. They are in constant telepathic link, as if he is a part of Archanfel, which explains the nature of his sudden loyalty towards Archanfel. He is now more powerful than Guyot was and has been given Guyot's Zoacrystal. Masaki is a tall, thin young man with shoulder-length hair. He normally wears sunglasses even at night. After Archanfel gets his claws into him, the glasses conceal the fact he now has cat-pupiled eyes.

== Manga volumes ==
Bio Booster Armor Guyver Volumes
No.	Title	Original release date	English release date
1	Bio Booster Armor Guyver; De-kan!! Kyōi no Kyōshoku Sōkō (出観!!驚異の強殖装甲)	March 20, 1986; 4-04-713239-X	August 5, 1995; 1-56931-032-7
2	Revenge of Chronos; Tsuigeki e no Purerūdo (追撃への序曲(プレリュード))	December 20, 1986; 4-04-713240-3	August 5, 1995; 1-56931-091-2
3	Dark Masters; Haipāzoanoido!! Go-ri no chōsen (超獣戦士(ハイパーゾアノイド)!! 五人の挑戦)	October 20, 1987; 4-04-713241-1	March 7, 1996; 1-56931-067-X
4	Escape from Chronos; Muteki!? Fumetsu no zoarōdo (無敵!? 不滅のゾアロード)	August 20, 1988; 4-04-713242-X	September 5, 1996; 1-56931-136-6

5. The 12 Lords
6. Guyot's Counterattack
7. The Menace of the Remover
8. A New Beginning
9. Guyver Gigantic
10. The 13th Lord
11. The Living Ark
12. Archanfel's Island
13. Gigantic Dark
14. Final Match
15. The Return of the Guyver
16. Purg'stall's Attack
17. His Name is Libertus
18. Imakarum's Awakening
19. To the Abyss
20. Evil Aptom
21. Revenge
22. The Dark Kingdom's Rebirth
23. The Real Face of Divinity
24. Aptom's Return
25. The Draglord's Attack
26. Reid of the Valkyria
27. Beginning of Calamity
28. Gigantomakhia
29. The Unexpected Guests
30. On the Isle of Mysterious
31. Yoke of Fate
32. Colossi of the Darkness

== Media ==
=== Anime ===
==== Guyver: Out of Control (1986) ====
Cover of the US/Canada release of Guyver: Out of Control OVA VHS tape. Released by L.A. Hero.

Guyver: Out of Control is a 1986 short horror original video animation based on the manga. It was produced in Japan by Bandai, Studio Live, Network, Animate and Movic and in association with AIC, Artland, Studio Victory, Wave and Only For A Lite. It was released in the U.S. and Canada in 1993 by L.A. Hero under the Dark Image Entertainment label. It has since been out of print in North America. The story follows high school students Shō Fukamachi and Mizuki Segawa who accidentally discover one of three Bio Booster Armor units stolen from the Chronos Corporation. When Shō and Mizuki are attacked by a Zoanoid, the unit comes into contact with Shō and bonds with him, transforming him into Guyver I and promptly destroying the Zoanoid assailant. Meanwhile, a female Chronos agent named Valcuria acquires a second unit and becomes Guyver II. She then abducts Mizuki in order to challenge Shō for the Guyver I unit. On Anime News Network, Justin Sevakis called it an "extremely dated piece of pulp that still somehow manages to be fun".

==== The Guyver: Bio-Booster Armor (1989–1992) ====
The Guyver: Bio-Booster Armor is a 12-episode OVA series based on the first four volumes of the manga.

==== Guyver: The Bioboosted Armor (2005–2006) ====
Guyver: The Bioboosted Armor is a 26-episode anime series based on the first ten volumes of the manga.

=== Live action ===
==== The Guyver (1991) ====
The Guyver was released in 1991 and stars Mark Hamill as a supporting character who did not appear in the manga.

==== Guyver 2: Dark Hero (1994) ====
Guyver 2: Dark Hero was released in 1994 and is the sequel to the 1991 film.
