= At Ease (TV series) =

- Genre: Sitcom
- Created by: John Hughes
- Written by: Tom Biener; Ron Landry; Arthur Julian; John Hughes
- Directed by: Bob Sweeney; Hy Averback; Edward H. Feldman
- Starring: Roger Bowen; Jimmie Walker; John Vargas; Jourdan Fremin; Richard Jaeckel; Josh Mostel; David Naughton; George Wyner
- Theme music composer: Jack Elliott
- Opening theme: Jack Elliott
- Composer: Jack Elliott
- Country of origin: United States
- Original language: English
- No. of seasons: 1
- No. of episodes: 14 (+1 Pilot episode)

Production
- Executive producers: Aaron Spelling; Douglas S. Cramer
- Producers: Hy Averback; Jim Mulligan
- Cinematography: Archie R. Dalzell
- Editor: Samuel E. Beetley
- Running time: 24 min.
- Production company: Aaron Spelling Productions

Original release
- Network: ABC
- Release: March 4 – June 10, 1983

At Ease is an American sitcom starring Jimmie Walker that aired for 14 episodes on ABC from March 4 to June 10, 1983, with reruns continuing until July 15, 1983.

== Synopsis ==
The series, which has a similar premise to another classic show, Sgt. Bilko, follows the misadventures of a pair of conniving GIs – Sgt. Val Valentine and PFC. Tony Baker – stationed at Camp Tar Creek, an Army base, dealing with computers and computer logistics, located somewhere in Texas. It is run by Colonel Clapp, who can be somewhat dense and credulous.

Valentine and Baker, along with the rest of their outfit, Company J., which includes privates Cardinal, Maurice and the klutzy and always hungry Maxwell, attempt to outwit the Colonel's by-the-book chief of security Major Hawkins and his informant Cpl. Wessel (who is very derisively called "Weasel" by Baker and Valentine, due to his propensity to snitch on Valentine and Baker to Hawkins), and profit from their hitch in the army.

Hawkins always tries to shut down Valentine and Baker's schemes and shape the camp up to his high standards, but he usually ends up failing.

They are also assisted in their efforts by Baker's girlfriend, Cpl. Lola Grey, who serves as Clapp's secretary.

== Cast ==
- Roger Bowen - Col. Clapp
- Jimmie Walker - Sgt. Val Valentine
- John Vargas - Cardinal
- Jourdan Fremin - Cpl. Lola Grey
- Richard Jaeckel - Maj. Hawkins
- Josh Mostel - Maxwell
- David Naughton - Pfc. Tony Baker
- George Wyner - Cpl. Wessel (aka "Weasel")
- Jeffrey Bannister - Maurice

== US TV ratings ==
Season	Episodes	Start date	End date	Nielsen rank	Nielsen rating
1982-83	14	March 4, 1983	June 10, 1983	67	N/A

== Episodes ==
No.	Title	Directed by	Written by	Original release date
1	"A Tankful of Dollars"	Hy Averback	Tom Biener & Ron Landry	March 4, 1983
Baker and Valentine are disciplined for on-base gambling.
2	"Chariots of Fear"	Bob Sweeney	Tom Biener & Ron Landry	March 11, 1983
3	"Computer Dating"	Bob Sweeney	Arthur Julian	March 18, 1983
Baker and Valentine plot to use the base's computer as a computer dating service.
4	"Prairie Moon Over Texas"	Edward H. Feldman	Tom Biener & Ron Landry	March 25, 1983
Baker and Valentine get caught renting Army equipment to a nudist colony.
5	"Murder on the Tar Creek Express"	Hy Averback	Tom Biener & Ron Landry	April 1, 1983
Colonel Clapp's new automated security system is sabotaged.
6	"Love Sick"	Hy Averback	Tom Biener & Ron Landry	April 8, 1983
Baker pretends to be sick in order to be looked at by a pretty doctor.
7	"The Marriage of the Figaros"	Hy Averback	Tom Biener & Ron Landry	April 15, 1983
Baker and Valentine rent the chapel to a couple wanting a military wedding.
8	"The Ballad of Lucinda Ballard"	Hy Averback	Stephanie Garman & Hollace White	April 22, 1983
Corporal Grey bets Major Hawkins that there has been an American female war hero.
9	"The Great Computer Robbery"	Bob Sweeney	Arthur Julian	April 29, 1983
After one insult too many, the soldiers get revenge on Major Hawkins by stealing his secret laser device.
10	"A PFC and a Gentleman"	Bob Sweeney	Arthur Julian	May 13, 1983
Baker plans a romantic evening with Lola, but is ordered on a mission.
11	"A Tar Creek Sting"	Edward H. Feldman	Tom Biener & Ron Landry	May 20, 1983
The soldiers force Corporal Wessel to help them break up a gambling ring at the saloon.
12	"Valentine's Day"	Bob Sweeney	Arthur Julian	May 27, 1983
A Texas state police officer comes to the base believing that Valentine is seeing his girlfriend.
13	"Maxwell's People"	Bob Sweeney	Arthur Julian	June 3, 1983
A Russian spy is working at Tar Creek and the Pentagon thinks one of the soldiers is providing her with information.
14	"The Tar Creek Chronicles"	Hy Averback	John Hughes	June 10, 1983
A former All-American football player arrives at Tar Creek and Colonel Clapp wants to play him against Navy. (Note: this was the original pilot film for the series, featuring a slightly different cast and setting. A different opening and closing sequence was used for the pilot.)
