= Guyver (surname) =

Guyver or Guiver is a surname that has mostly dropped out of use. According to Government Stats on voters, it is the 4066th most common name.

"Guyver" originally spelled "Gyver" is an old English family name which has been traced back to the death of Richard Gyver in 1544. The family home still exists in Ugley, Essex. An alternative spelling came about when the old English vowel 'Y' was changed to an 'I', so that Tyme became Time, Wyllyam became William and so on. The Guiver branch of the family is now larger than the original Gyver/Guyver side which still uses the old spelling.

== People with the surname Guiver/Guyver ==
- Iris Guiver Wilkinson, who wrote under the pen name Robin Hyde
- Neil Guiver, musician and former member of The Mark of Cain (band)
- Robin Guiver, manager of the Humboldt Crabs
