= Guyver: Dark Hero =

1994 American sci-fi sequel film

- Directed by: Steve Wang
- Screenplay by: Nathan Long
- Story by: Steve Wang
- Based on: Bio Booster Armor Guyver by Yoshiki Takaya
- Produced by: Steve Wang
- Starring: David Hayter; Kathy Christopherson; Christopher Michael
- Cinematography: Michael G. Wojciechowski
- Edited by: Steve Wang
- Music by: Les Claypool III
- Production companies: Biomorphs, Inc.; L.A. Hero
- Distributed by: New Line Cinema
- Release date: April 20, 1994 (Japan)
- Running time: 123 minutes
- Country: United States
- Language: English
- Budget: $800,000

Guyver: Dark Hero (also known as Guyver 2: Dark Hero; (Note: Released as Guyver 2: Dark Hero on VHS and LaserDisc and The Guyver 2 on DVD.) released in the Philippines as Predator 3) is a 1994 American science fiction tokusatsu superhero film based on the manga and anime, Bio Booster Armor Guyver. It is a sequel to the 1991 film The Guyver. Written by Nathan Long and directed by Steve Wang, the film stars David Hayter in the title role, replacing Jack Armstrong.

Unlike the previous film, Guyver: Dark Hero follows a more serious and darker tone much closer to the source material (the flashback to the Creation of the Guyvers, for instance, is taken almost verbatim from the original manga). Due to the film's low budget, it went direct-to-video in the United States, but was given a limited theatrical run in foreign countries. It was rated R (unlike the PG-13 rating of the first movie) due to several scenes depicting gore and brutality. Despite not receiving a theatrical release, the film gained a cult following and was met with more favorable reviews than its predecessor.

== Plot ==
One year after bonding with the Guyver unit and destroying the Cronos Corporation, the company responsible for the Guyver and the creatures called the Zoanoids, in Los Angeles, Sean Barker has been using his powers to fight crime. Unfortunately, the Guyver unit's desire to kill has left Sean emotionally exhausted. Learning of cave drawings that resemble the images he has been seeing in his dreams discovered in the mountains of Utah, Sean makes his way to the archeological dig taking place there. Along the way, he encounters Cori Edwards, daughter of Marcus Edwards, the lead archeologist at the site.

Upon arrival, Sean discovers a skull resembling Lisker's, a Zoanoid that he fought a year ago. Later that night, Sean battles a Zoanoid called Volker, which has been terrorizing the archeological dig. When their battle is cut short by the arrival of Cori and her team (which enables Volker to escape), Sean is questioned by a suspicious Commander Atkins, who reveals that the Guyver only destroyed the Los Angeles branch of the Cronos Corporation and that another branch of Cronos is behind the Zoanoid attacks in the mountains.

The very next day, the team of archaeologists unearths an extraterrestrial ship. After several unsuccessful attempts to breach it, the ship mysteriously opens up a hatch for the archaeologists to enter. Inside, Sean communicates with the ship and demands that it removes the Guyver unit from within him. Meanwhile, Cori discovers a damaged Guyver unit, but Arlen Crane confiscates it from her. Attempting to confront Crane, Cori instead learns that Arlen Crane actually works for the Cronos Corporation and plans to terminate all non-Cronos personnel at the site. She is captured by Volker eavesdropping and is escorted in a jeep. The jeep is attacked by Marcus, revealed to be a Zoanoid, who battles both Monk and Volker Zoanoids but is eventually overwhelmed. At the camp, Crane reveals himself as a Zoanoid to Sean, who rejects his offer of an alliance to activate the ship and turn himself and the Zoanoids back to normal. Crane has his chief of security, Brandi Harris, sedate and bind Sean. Atkins frees Sean who rushes to save Cori as the Guyver. After killing both Monk and Volker Zoanoids, the Guyver spares Marcus and reveals his identity to Cori.

At the camp, Atkins and his commandos prevent Crane from executing the archaeological team and safely evacuate them. However, Atkins is captured and his commandos are brutally murdered by one of the escaping Zoanoids.

Sean reveals to Cori that he plans to destroy the ship. Whilst Sean communicates with the ship, seeing images of prehistoric times with the creation of Zoanoids and the Guyver units, Cori plants dynamites in the dig site but is captured by Crane and his Zoanoids. With Cori as a hostage, Crane demands Sean to deactivate the Guyver unit and surrender. Marcus intervenes and a battle ensues: Marcus battles Crane but is killed in the process, Atkins manage to kill Brandi, a Zoanoid as well, after electrocuting and finally shooting her dead. Sean kills the remaining Zoanoids and confronts Crane, who reveals he has merged with the damaged Guyver unit and transforms into a Guyver-Zoanoid. Faster and stronger, he overwhelms Sean, stabbing him in the chest, but Cori shoots Crane's Control Medal. Sean removes the damaged Control Medal – which causes the Guyver suit to consume Crane – and uses his Mega Smasher to put Crane out of his misery.

Following the events, Sean reveals to Cori that the Guyvers were a failed experiment: in prehistoric times, aliens had attempted to turn primitive humans into Guyvers to fight their wars, but the humans rebelled, forcing the aliens to leave Earth. Using his Control Medal, Sean instructs the ship to return to its home planet. With the battle won, Atkins attempts to recruit Sean to aid the government in fighting an underground war against the Cronos Corporation, but Sean refuses and drives off with Cori instead.

== Cast ==
- David Hayter as Sean Barker / The Guyver
- Kathy Christopherson as Cori Edwards
- Bruno Patrick as Arlen Crane (credited as Bruno Gianotta)
- Christopher Michael as Commander Atkins
- Stuart Weiss as Marcus Edwards
- Billie Lee as Mizky Segawa
- Alisa Merline as Brandi Harris
- Kristen Calkins as Lois
- Jim O'Donoghoe as Mr. Gouo
- J. D. Smith as Doug Kerlew
- Wes Deitrick as Gus Volker
- Stephen Oprychal as Bob
- Koichi Sakamoto as Sakai
- Butch Portillo as Bo
- Christopher J. Bradshaw as Grau
- Vern Roguen as Mazzo
- Nathan Long as Cop #1
- Lisa Hannan as Cop #2
- Shaun T. Benjamin as D.C.

=== Suit actors ===
- Anthony Houk as The Guyver
- Akihiro Yuji Noguchi as Guyver (Stunt)
- Brian Simpson as Benny / Gus Volker Zoanoid / Arlen Crane Zoanoid
- Tatsuro Koike as Guyver Zoanoid
- Ted Smith as Stenzoanoid / Mazzo Zoanoid
- David McDonald as Dr. Marcus Edwards Zoanoid
- Scott Putman as Corben Zoanoid
- C. D. Post as Monk Zoanoid
- Kristen Calkins as Primitive Guyver

== Release ==
Guyver: Dark Hero was released direct-to-video in the United States in 1994. The film is also alternatively released as Guyver 2: Dark Hero in the US. In the Philippines, the film was released by Solar Films in theaters as Predator 3 on March 9, 1995, rated "PG 7" by the Movie and Television Review and Classification Board (MTRCB).

=== Critical response ===
Guyver 2 was more critically successful than its predecessor. Glenn Kenny of Entertainment Weekly said the film "often plays like an R-rated Mighty Morphin Power Rangers installment ... that's genuinely amusing if you're in the right frame of mind." David Johnson of DVD Verdict said that while "the acting is wretched," Guyver 2 is "a much better effort" than the original film. "The action is 100 times better [and] it kept me fairly entertained throughout." Nathan Shumate of Cold Fusion Video Reviews also felt that Guyver 2 was better than the original film, praising its action scenes and saying that David Hayter replacing original star Jack Armstrong was an improvement.

In September 2026, Guyver 2 was given an official Bluray release both region A and B were both released by Toy Robot Video. It came in a 2-disc set – one with the original 1994 cut and the second disc features an enhanced version with updated/additional effects.
