= List of horror anime =

This is a list of horror anime television series, films, and OVAs. While not all inclusive, this list contains numerous works that are representative of the genre. For accuracy of the list, the most common English usage is followed by Japanese name and romaji version. The column for year represents the first premiere of the work, in the case of series the year of the first release.

English name	Japanese name	Type	Year	Studio	Regions
Amon: The Darkside of The Devilman	AMON デビルマン黙示録 - AMON debiruman mokushiroku	OVA	2000	Studio Live	
Another	アナザー - Anazā	TV	2012	P.A. Works	JA/EN
Hell girl	Jigoku Shojo, 地獄少女	TV	2005	Studio Deen	JA/EN
Ayakashi: Samurai Horror Tales	Ayakashi	TV	2006	Toei Animation	JA
Blue Literature Series	青い文学シリーズ - Aoi Bungaku Series	TV	2009	Madhouse	JA
Dark Myth	暗黒神話 - Ankoku Shinwa	OVA	1990	Ajia-do	JA
Betterman	ベターマン	TV	1999	Sunrise	JA/EN
Bio Hunter	バイオ・ハンター	OVA	1995	Madhouse	JA
Blood-C		TV	2011	Production I.G	JA/EN
Blood: The Last Vampire		Movie	2000	Production I.G	JA/EN
Blue Gender	ブルージェンダー - Burū Jendā	TV	1999	AIC	JA/EN
Blue Gender: The Warrior		Movie	2002	AIC	JA/EN
Boogiepop Phantom	ブギーポップは笑わない Boogiepop Phantom	TV	2000	Madhouse	JA/EN
Bride of Deimos	悪魔の花嫁 - Deimosu no Hanayome	OVA	1988	Madhouse	JA
Curse of Kazuo Umezu	Umezu Kazuo no Noroi	OVA			JA/EN
Corpse Party: Missing Footage		OVA	2012		
Corpse Party: Tortured Souls	Bougyakusareta Tamashii no Jukyou	OVA	2013		
Danganronpa: The Animation	ダンガンロンパ: The Animation	TV	2013	Lerche	JA/EN
Dark Cat		OVA	1991	E&G Films, Agent 21	JA/EN
Demon City Shinjuku	魔界都市 (新宿) - Makai Toshi: Shinjuku	Movie	1988	Madhouse	JA/EN
Demon Lord Dante		TV	2002	Magic Bus	JA/EN
Demon Prince Enma		OVA	2006	Bandai Visual, Brain's Base	JA/EN
Digital Devil Story: Megami Tensei		OVA			JA/EN
Doomed Megalopolis	帝都物語 - Teitō Monogatari	OVA	1991	Madhouse	JA/EN
Elfen Lied	エルフェンリート - Erufen Rīto	TV	2004	Arms Corporation	JA
Future Diary	未来日記 - Mirai Nikki	TV	2011	Asread	JA/EN
Gantz	ガンツ - Gantsu	TV	2004	Gonzo	JA
Goblin Slayer	ゴブリンスレイヤー, Hepburn: Goburin Sureiyā	TV	2020	Square Enix	JA/EN
Gregory Horror Show		TV	1999	Milky Cartoon, TV Asahi	JA/EN
Galerians: Rion		Movie	2002	Enterbrain, Polygon Magic	JA/EN
Genocyber		OVA	1994	Artmic	JA/EN
Ghost Hunt		TV	2006	J.C. Staff	JA/EN
Hakaba Kitaro (GeGeGe no Kitaro)		TV	1968	Toei Animation	JA
Happy Sugar Life	ハッピーシュガーライフ - Happī Shugā Raifu	TV	2018	Ezo'la	JA
Hellsing		TV	2001	Gonzo	JA/EN
Hellsing Ultimate		OVA	2006	Satelight, Madhouse, Graphnica, Kelmadick	JA/EN
Hell Target		Movie	1987		JA
Highschool of the Dead	学園黙示録 - Gakuen Mokushiroku Haisukūru obu za Deddo	TV	2010	Madhouse	JA/EN
Higurashi When They Cry	ひぐらしのなく頃に - Higurashi no Naku Koro ni	TV	2006	Studio Deen	JA
Interlude		OVA	2003	Toei Animation	JA/EN
Jigokudou Reikai Tsuushin		OVA	1996		JA
Judge		OVA	1991	J.C. Staff	JA/EN
Kakurenbo: Hide & Seek		OVA	2005	Shuhei Morita	JA/EN
The Laughing Salesman	笑ゥせぇるすまん - Warau Seerusuman	TV	1989	Shin-Ei Animation	JA
Laughing Target		OVA	1987	Studio Pierrot, Shogakukan Production	JA/EN
Le Portrait de Petit Cossette	コゼットの肖像 (Kozetto no Shōzō)	OVA	2004	Daume	JA
Lily C.A.T.		OVA	1987	Studio Pierrot	JA
Malice@Doll		OVA	2001	GAGA Communications	JA
Mermaid's Forest		OVA	1991	Studio Pierrot, Victor Entertainment	JA
Mermaid's Scar		OVA	1993	Madhouse	JA
Mermaid's Forest		TV	2003	TMS Entertainment	JA
Mononoke		TV	2007	Toei Animation	JA/EN
Monster of Frankenstein	Kyoufu Densetsu Kaiki! Frankenstein	TV movie	1981	Toei Animation	JA
Mōryō no Hako		TV	2008	Madhouse	JA
Night Head Genesis		TV	2006	Foursome Co., Ltd.	JA/EN
Ogre Slayer	鬼切丸 - Onikirimaru	OVA	1994	OB Planning	JA
Ookami Kakushi		TV	2010	AIC	JA
Ousama Game		TV	2011	BS-TBS CBS	JA
Parasyte: The Maxim	寄生獣 セイの格率 - Kiseijū Sei No Kakuritsu	TV	2014	Madhouse	JA
Pet Shop of Horrors	ペットショップ オブ ホラーズ, Pettoshoppu obu Horāzu?	OVA	1999	Madhouse	JA/EN
Pupa		TV	2014	Studio Deen	JA
Puppet Princess		OVA	2000		JA/EN
Requiem from the Darkness		TV	2003	Tokyo Movie Shinsha	JA/EN
Roots Search		OVA	1986		JA
Shadow Star Narutaru	なるたる (骸なる星2003 珠たる子) - Narutaru (Mukuro Naru Hoshi Tama Taru Ko)	TV	2003	Planet	JA
Shiki		TV	2010	Daume	JA/EN
Shin Megami Tensei: Tokyo Mokushiroku		Movie	1995		JA/EN
SoulTaker		TV	2001	Tatsunoko Production	JA/EN
Terra Formars		TV	2014	Linden Films	JA
Terra Formars: Revenge		TV	2016	Linden Films, TYO Animations	JA
Thriller Restaurant		TV	2009	Toei Animation	JA
Tokko		TV	2006	AIC Spirits, Group TAC	JA
Tokyo Ghoul	東京喰種 トーキョーグール - Tokyo Guuru	TV	2014	Studio Pierrot	JA/EN
Tokyo Majin	東京魔人學園剣風帖 龖 - Tokyo Majin Gakuen Kenpuchō: Tō	TV	2007	Animax	JA/EN
Tokyo Majin: 2nd Act		TV	2007	Animax	JA/EN
Twilight of the Dark Master		Movie	1998	Madhouse	JA/EN
Violence Jack: Harem Bomber		OVA	1986	Soei Shinsha, Ashi Production	JA/EN
Violence Jack: Evil Town		OVA	1988	Soei Shinsha, Japan Home Video, Studio88, D.A.S.T.	
Violence Jack: Hell's Wind Hen		OVA	1990	Soei Shinsha, Japan Home Video, Studio88	
Wasurenagumo		TV special	2011		JA
Wicked City		Movie	1987		JA/EN
Uzumaki		Mini-series	2022	Production I.G.	JA/EN
Zombie Land Saga	ゾンビランドサガ, Hepburn: Zonbi Rando Saga	TV	2023	MAPPA, Avex Pictures and Cygames	JA/EN
