= Christopher Michael =

American actor

Christopher Michael is an American actor, director and writer who started his career in the early 1980s, appearing between 1982 and 1987 in five soap operas — One Life to Live, As the World Turns, Guiding Light, Search for Tomorrow and Santa Barbara. He is most famous for portraying Sergeant / Detective / Captain / Chief Michaels on 7th Heaven. He appeared in over 45 episodes throughout the show's 1996–2006 243-episode run.

== Filmography ==
- The Escapist (1983) as Radio Station Executive
- South Bronx Heroes (1985) as Big Zeke
- Heartbreak Ridge (1986) as Marine
- Identity Crisis (1989) as Jailor
- New Jack City (1991) as Bailiff
- Guyver: Dark Hero (1994) as Commander Atkins
- The Fresh Prince of Bel-Air (1995) as Juror #2
- Family Matters, Episode: "My Uncle the Hero" as Police officer who brought in a pick pocket suspect (1995)
- The Cable Guy (1996) as Arresting Officer
- 7th Heaven (1996–2007) as Sergeant/Detective/Captain/Chief Michaels
- Fools Rush In (1997) as Dam Police Officer who delivers baby
- The Wayans Bros., Episode: “Fire!” as Arson Investigator (1998)
- Friends (2001) as Airport Security Officer (deleted scene)
- New Alcatraz (2002) as Captain Thomas
- Drake & Josh (2004) as Doctor, Episode: "Dune Buggy"
- Medium (2005) Episode I Married A Mind Reader as Prison Guard
- 24 (2008) as security officer at the FBI: Washington, DC branch
- iCarly (2007, 2009) as Officer Carl, Episode: "iWant More Viewers"
- The Young and the Restless (2009) as Jail Guard
- The Secret Life of the American Teenager (2008–2012) as football coach/ interim guidance counselor at fiction Ulysses S. Grant High School
- Hard Flip (2012) as Ralph
- Grey's Anatomy (2012) as Ray
- Castle (2014) as Officer Simms (episode "Driven")
- Brooklyn Nine-Nine (2014) as Officer Hank
- Community (2015) as Security Guard #2 (episode "Laws of Robotics & Party Rights")
