= Yoshiki Takaya =

Japanese manga artist (born 1960)

- Born: February 21, 1960 (age 66); Akita Prefecture, Japan
- Other name: Moriwo Chimi
- Occupation: Manga artist
- Known for: Bio Booster Armor Guyver

Yoshiki Takaya (Japanese: 高屋 良樹, Hepburn: Takaya Yoshiki; born February 21, 1960) is a Japanese manga artist best known for creating the manga Guyver.

== Career ==
Takaya began as a hentai manga artist under the pen name Moriwo Chimi (ちみもりを, Chimi Moriwo), with several works printed in the adult manga magazine Lemon People, published by Kubo Shoten. The best known of these is Hades Project Zeorymer, which was adapted as a four episode original video animation (OVA) by AIC. He also had stories published in the manga anthology series Petit Apple Pie under this pen name.

Takaya was contributing to Ochazukenori's doujinshi anthology Pen Touch. The work of Ochazukenori was an inspiration to him: "The kind of stories that Nori was drawing weren't what you'd call 'popular.' Our fanzine was the only place where he could create his own ideal manga."

His most successful series Guyver has been adapted into multiple anime features as well as live-action films. Guyver was serialized in Monthly Shōnen Captain (published by Tokuma Shoten) for the lifetime of the magazine from February 18, 1985, to 1997. When Captain was cancelled, the manga moved to Shōnen Ace, published by Kadokawa Shoten, who also reprinted the collected volumes from the beginning. There are 32 tankōbon available. In an interview found in the Blu-Ray release of Guyver: Dark Hero, Yoshiki Takaya revealed he suffered a cerebral infarction that paralyzed his right side and is unlikely to finish the manga.

== Works ==
=== As Moriwo Chimi ===
- Project Zeorymer (冥王計画ゼオライマー), in Lemon People; October 1983 to November 1984, in Monthly Comic Ryū, June 2007 to August 2007
- Ta-ta-ka-e Otō-san (た·た·か·え お父さん!!), in Lemon People, May 1984
- ALEF, in Lemon People, February 1985
- Cross Fire (クロス·ファイア), single volume, April 1985 ISBN 4-7659-0214-5, republished 1990-07-10 ISBN 4-7659-0280-3
- Kokoro no Yami ni Ai no Uzu (心の闇に愛の渦), in Lemon People, July 1986

=== As Yoshiki Takaya ===
- Kyōshoku Sōkō Guyver (強殖装甲ガイバー), in Shōnen Captain, 1985-02-18 to February 1997, resumed in Shōnen Ace

== General and cited references ==
- Landolt-C information on Zeorymer (English version)
- Cross Fire on Kuboama site
- List of H comic back issues and List of Shōnen Captain back issues on Kirara Bunko
- Hanazono Univ A rumor with alma mater of Yoshiki Takaya
