= Steve Wang =

Taiwanese-born American make-up artist and filmmaker

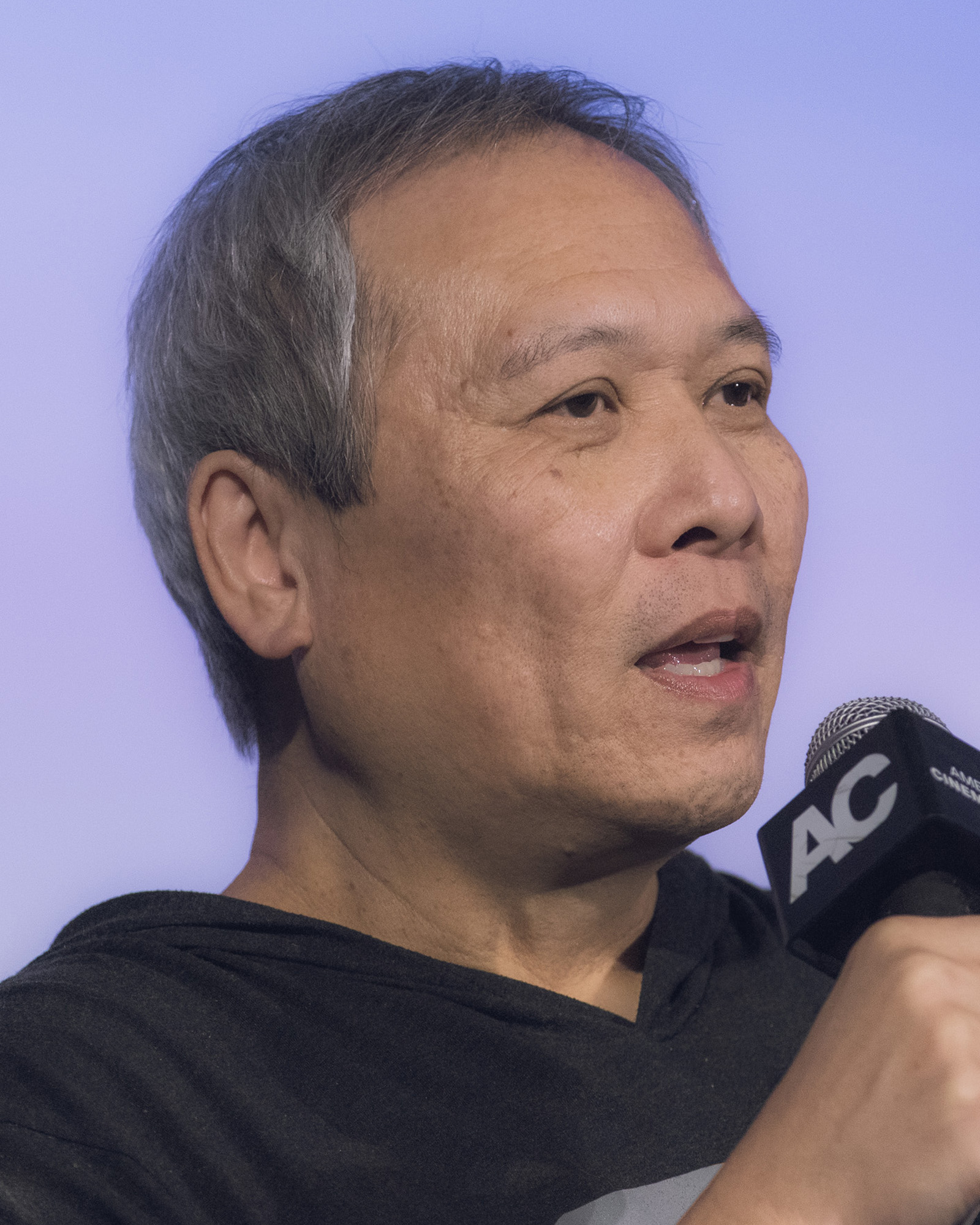
- Wang in 2025
- Born: Taipei, Taiwan
- Citizenship: United States
- Occupations: Film director, make-up artist
- Known for: Kung Pow! Enter the Fist

Steve Wang (Chinese: 王孫杰; pinyin: Wáng Sūnjié) is an American make-up artist and filmmaker.

== Biography ==
Born in Taiwan, he and his parents moved to the United States when he was nine. His greatest inspirations were the tokusatsu superhero TV shows Ultraman and Kamen Rider, as well as Hong Kong kung fu films including Master of the Flying Guillotine.

As a veteran makeup artist and creature designer, Steve has worked with fellow veterans before him including Stan Winston, Rick Baker and Dick Smith.

Another project which drew attention to him was the direct to video movie, Drive, which starred Mark Dacascos and Kadeem Hardison. He also made independent films such as Kung Fu Rascals, based on a series of 8 mm short films he did years before. He and his brother Michael Wang, an award-winning commercials director, were hired in 2008 to work on Kamen Rider: Dragon Knight (an adaptation of Kamen Rider Ryuki), a second attempt at reviving the Kamen Rider Series in the United States, after Saban's Masked Rider of 1995. They write, produce, and direct as "The Wang Brothers".

In 1999, he designed the visual effects for an aborted Film Roman creation Sirens of the Deep, for the proposed Max Degree TV block, but it was cancelled due to lack of international backers.

Steve Wang designed a sculpture depicting Sarah Kerrigan (The Queen of Blades), a character from the Starcraft Universe in 2012. The sculpture was placed at the Blizzard Entertainment Office in Versailles, France the same year. He has also made statues of Tryndamere and Ryze, two champions from League of Legends, for Riot Games that same year. During the promotion for the beta release of Firefall, Wang was commissioned to create sculptures of game characters to be displayed at conventions.

== Filmography ==
=== Director ===
- Rollerblade II: Taken By Force (1989) - 2nd unit director
- The Guyver (1991) - co-director
- Kung Fu Rascals (1992)
- Guyver: Dark Hero (1994)
- Drive (1997)
- Sirens of the Deep (1999 - TV show/pilot)
- Power Rangers Lost Galaxy (1999)
- Kung Pow! Enter the Fist (2002) - 2nd unit director
- Wolvy: Twisted at Birth (2003) - 3-episode short film series
- Kamen Rider: Dragon Knight (2009)

=== Producer ===
- Kung Fu Rascals (1992)
- Guyver: Dark Hero (1994)
- Kamen Rider: Dragon Knight (2009)
- Beast Wishes (2012)
