= Hulk in other media =

Comic character Hulk in other media

Adaptations of the Hulk in other media
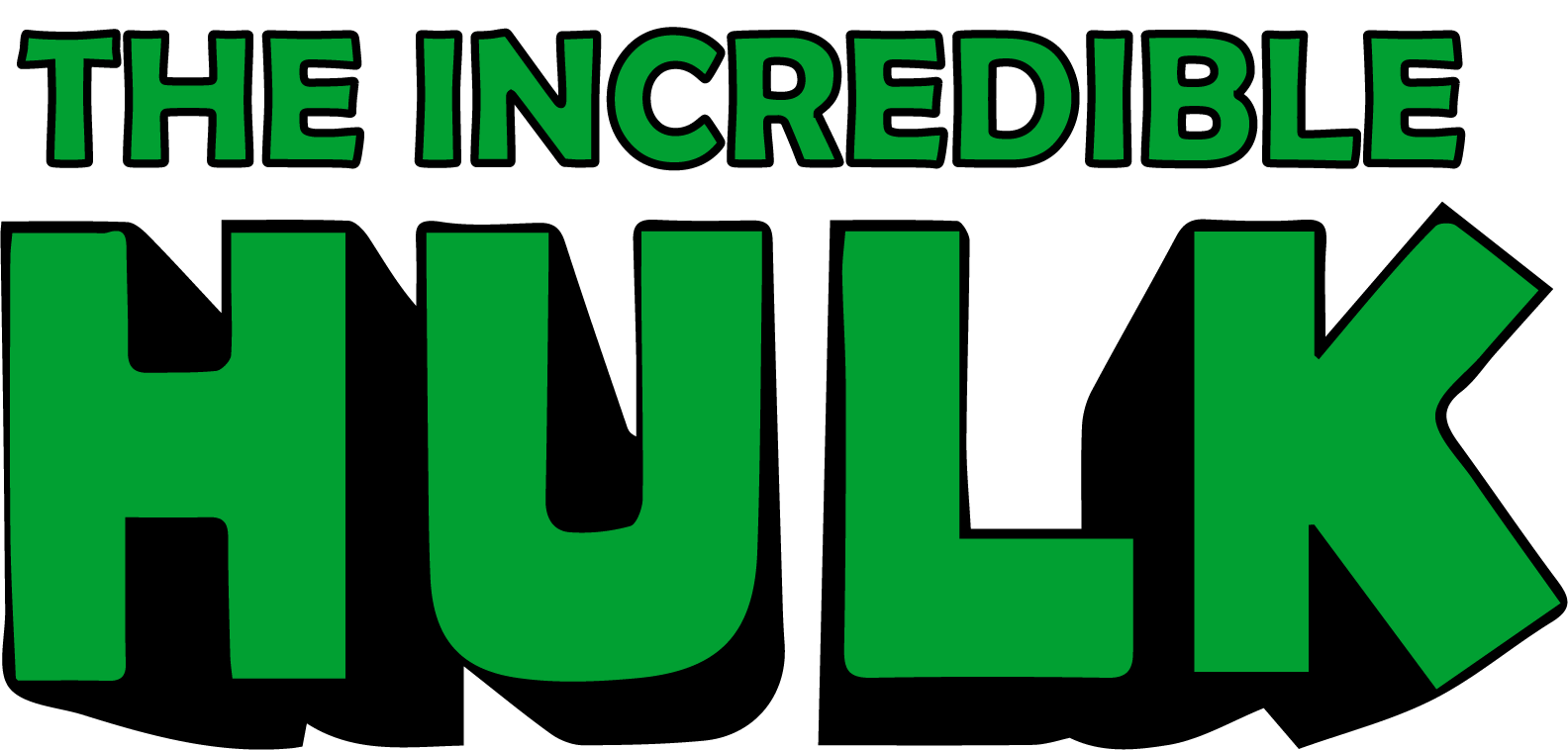
- Original source: Comics published by Marvel Comics
- First appearance: The Incredible Hulk #1 (May 1962)

Print publications
- Novel(s): The Incredible Hulk: Stalker From the Stars (1978); The Incredible Hulk: Cry of the Beast (1979)

Films and television
- Film(s): Hulk (2003); The Incredible Hulk (2008); The Avengers (2012); Avengers: Age of Ultron (2015); Thor: Ragnarok (2017); Avengers: Infinity War (2018); Avengers: Endgame (2019); Spider-Man: Brand New Day (2026)
- Television show(s): The Marvel Super Heroes (1966); The Incredible Hulk (1978–82); The Incredible Hulk (1982–83); The Incredible Hulk (1996–97); Hulk and the Agents of S.M.A.S.H. (2013–2015); She-Hulk: Attorney at Law (2022)

Games
- Video game(s): The Incredible Hulk (1994); The Incredible Hulk: The Pantheon Saga (1996); The Incredible Hulk (2003); Hulk (2003); The Incredible Hulk: Ultimate Destruction (2005); The Incredible Hulk (2008)

Since the 1960s, the Marvel Comics superhero the Hulk has appeared in many types of various media other than the comics, such as animated and live-action TV series, films, books, video games, comic strips, and stage shows.

== Television ==
=== Animation ===
==== 1960s ====
Hulk as depicted in The Marvel Super Heroes.

Hulk debuted in television in 1966 as part of The Marvel Super Heroes animated series. It was produced by Grantray-Lawrence Animation, which was headed by Grant Simmons, Ray Patterson and Robert Lawrence. The series is in stop-motion comic book form, with radio personality Max Ferguson voicing both the Hulk and Bruce Banner. The 39 seven-minute segment episodes were shown along with those featuring other characters from the series, including Captain America, Iron Man, Thor, and Namor the Sub-Mariner. They were all based on the early stories from The Incredible Hulk and Tales to Astonish comic book series from Marvel. The series shows Bruce Banner's origin of becoming the Hulk and struggling to keep his dual identity a secret from everyone, as well as trying to maintain his romance with Betty Ross, friendship with Rick Jones—the only one knowing that Banner and the Hulk are the same—and battling super-villains such as the Leader, Metal Master, Ringmaster, Chameleon, Boomerang, and Tyrannus. At the same time, he must avoid capture by the military headed by Betty's father Thunderbolt Ross with his right-hand man Glenn Talbot.

==== 1980s ====
Hulk returns to television with the animated series The Incredible Hulk (1982–1983), voiced by Bob Holt as Hulk and Michael Bell as Bruce Banner. The series once again shows Bruce Banner transformed into Hulk by accident and struggling to keep it a secret from Betty Ross, and everyone else around him. Rick Jones is the one who shares his secret and helps control it while Bruce uses his powers to battle supervillains such as the Leader, Spymaster, Doctor Octopus, Hydra, and the Puppet Master; while fighting the military at the same time led by Betty's father General Thunderbolt Ross with Major Glenn Talbot whose first name had been changed to "Ned". This series features the first animated appearance of Bruce's cousin Jennifer, who becomes She-Hulk.

Hulk appears in the Spider-Man and His Amazing Friends episode "Spidey Goes Hollywood", with Peter Cullen voicing both Hulk and Bruce Banner.

==== 1990s ====
- A robotic duplicate of the Hulk appears in the X-Men: The Animated Series episode "The Juggernaut Returns".
- The Marvel Action Hour (1994–1996): Hulk appears in episodes of the Fantastic Four and Iron Man animated series that made up The Marvel Action Hour, with Ron Perlman voicing both him and Bruce Banner.
- The Incredible Hulk (1996–1997): Marvel Studios and Saban Entertainment made another animated series for the Hulk, with Neal McDonough voicing Bruce Banner, Lou Ferrigno voicing Hulk, Michael Donovan voicing Gray Hulk, and Kevin Michael Richardson voicing Dark Hulk. In 1997, the series became The Incredible Hulk and She-Hulk, when She-Hulk was given full-time status. Like the previous animated series, the show focused on his origin to Bruce's turmoil being the Hulk and his romance with Betty Ross as well as his friendship with Rick Jones (voiced by Luke Perry) who followed Hulk around to help look out for him while Hulk/Bruce was being hunted by the military led by Betty's father General Thunderbolt Ross, with Glenn Talbot helping, but eventually sees the error of his ways. The series also had Doc Samson in his first animated appearance who helped out Hulk, while at the same time battling him, and featured Hulk facing off against his archenemy the Leader with his Gamma mutated army including Abomination, Gargoyle, Ogress, and the Gamma Warriors; Hulk also dealt with other villains like Zzzax, Absorbing Man, and Doctor Doom.
- Hulk appears in a painting depicted in The Avengers: United They Stand episode "Avengers Assemble".

==== 2000s ====
- The Hulk appears in the Fantastic Four: World's Greatest Heroes episode "Hard Knocks" (2006), voiced by Mark Gibbon, while Bruce Banner is voiced by Andrew Kavadas.
- The Hulk appears in the Wolverine and the X-Men episode "Wolverine vs. the Hulk", voiced by Fred Tatasciore, while Bruce Banner is voiced by Gabriel Mann.
- The Hulk appears in Iron Man: Armored Adventures, voiced again by Mark Gibbon. In his most notable appearance in the episode "Rage of the Hulk", Bruce Banner enlists Iron Man and Howard Stark in an attempt to cure him with a machine that will siphon his gamma energy. However, this transforms him into the Gray Hulk after Thunderbolt Ross modifies it.
- Hulk appears in The Super Hero Squad Show, voiced by Travis Willingham.

==== 2010s ====
- The Hulk appears in The Avengers: Earth's Mightiest Heroes, with Gabriel Mann voicing Bruce Banner and Fred Tatasciore voicing Hulk again.
- The Hulk appears in Ultimate Spider-Man, once again voiced by Fred Tatasciore. Additionally, a Marvel Noir version of Joe Fixit appears in the episode "Return to the Spider-Verse" as a gang leader and rival of Hammerhead, also voiced by Tatasciore.
- The Hulk appears in Avengers Assemble, once again voiced by Fred Tatasciore, with Bruce Banner being voiced by Tatasciore in the first season, Jesse Burch in the third, and Kevin Shinick in the fourth.
- The Hulk appears in Hulk and the Agents of S.M.A.S.H., again voiced by Fred Tatasciore. This version is a member of the eponymous team, alongside She-Hulk, Red Hulk, and A-Bomb.
- The Hulk appears in Phineas and Ferb: Mission Marvel, again voiced by Fred Tatasciore.
- The Hulk appears in Ultimate Wolverine vs. Hulk, voiced by Michael Dobson, while Bruce Banner is voiced by Sebastian Spence.
- The Hulk appears in Lego Marvel Super Heroes: Maximum Overload, voiced again by Fred Tatasciore.
- The Hulk appears in Marvel Disk Wars: The Avengers, voiced by Kenichirou Matsuda in Japanese and Kyle Hebert in English.
- The Hulk appears in Lego Marvel Super Heroes: Avengers Reassembled, voiced again by Fred Tatasciore.
- The Hulk appears in Marvel Super Hero Adventures: Frost Fight!, voiced again by Fred Tatasciore.
- The Hulk appears in Guardians of the Galaxy (2015), once again voiced by Fred Tatasciore, with Bruce Banner again voiced by Jesse Burch in the second season and Kevin Shinick in the third.
- The Hulk appears in Marvel Future Avengers, again voiced by Kenichirou Matsuda in Japanese and Fred Tatasciore in English.
- The Hulk appears in Spider-Man (2017), again voiced by Fred Tatasciore, while Bruce Banner is again voiced by Kevin Shinick.
- The Hulk appears in Marvel Super Hero Adventures, voiced by James Blight.

==== 2020s ====
- The Hulk appears in Lego Marvel Avengers: Climate Conundrum, voiced again by James Blight.
- The Hulk appears in Lego Marvel Avengers: Loki in Training, voiced again by James Blight.
- The Hulk appears in Lego Marvel Avengers: Time Twisted, voiced again by James Blight.
- The Hulk appears in Spidey and His Amazing Friends, voiced primarily by Armen Taylor, while Sami Sharkawy voices him as a toddler in the episode "Lil Hulk".
- The Hulk appears in X-Men '97, voiced by J. P. Karliak, via Morph.
- The Hulk appears in Lego Marvel Avengers: Mission Demolition, voiced again by Fred Tatasciore.
- The Hulk appears in Lego Marvel Avengers: Strange Tails, voiced again by Fred Tatasciore.

=== Film ===
- A depiction of the Ultimate Marvel version of Hulk has been featured in Ultimate Avengers: The Movie, an animated direct-to-video adaptation of the Ultimates produced by Marvel Entertainment and Lions Gate Films, with Michael Massee voicing Bruce Banner, and Fred Tatasciore voicing the Hulk. Based on the Ultimate Hulk, Bruce Banner is working on recreating the super soldier serum. Banner thinking that the serum could help him control the Hulk, and creates a cure with his own blood. After the fight with the Chitauri, the Hulk becomes out of control and is taken down by the Avengers. In the sequel, Ultimate Avengers 2: Rise of the Panther, Banner (voiced again by Massee) has been imprisoned due to the previous film's events. At the end, the Hulk (voiced again by Tatasciore) breaks out of the cell and escapes.
- An elderly Hulk appears in the alternate universe Next Avengers: Heroes of Tomorrow, with Ken Kramer voicing Bruce Banner and Tatasciore reprising the role of the Hulk. He has decided to hide and keep away from other people for their own safety. The Young Avengers come up a plan to lure Ultron there so he can cause the Hulk to appear, destroying the robot. This plan worked as Torunn throws Ultron's body into space to prevent him from repairing himself.
- Tatasciore reprises his role of the Hulk in Hulk Vs., with Bryce Johnson voicing Bruce Banner.
- In Planet Hulk, Rick D. Wasserman voices the Hulk. The film is based on the "Planet Hulk" storyline.
- The Hulk appears as a central character in Iron Man & Hulk: Heroes United. Tatasciore reprises his role as the Hulk.
- The Hulk appears in the anime film Avengers Confidential: Black Widow & Punisher with Tatasciore reprising the role.
- Hulk appears in Iron Man and Captain America: Heroes United, with Tatasciore reprising his role.
- Hulk appears in Hulk: Where Monsters Dwell, with Bruce Banner voiced again by Jesse Burch and Hulk voiced again by Fred Tatasciore.
- Hulk appears in Lego Marvel Super Heroes: Black Panther – Trouble in Wakanda, with Tatasciore again reprising his role.
- Hulk appears in Lego Marvel Avengers: Code Red, voiced again by Fred Tatasciore.

== Live-action ==
=== 1970s ===
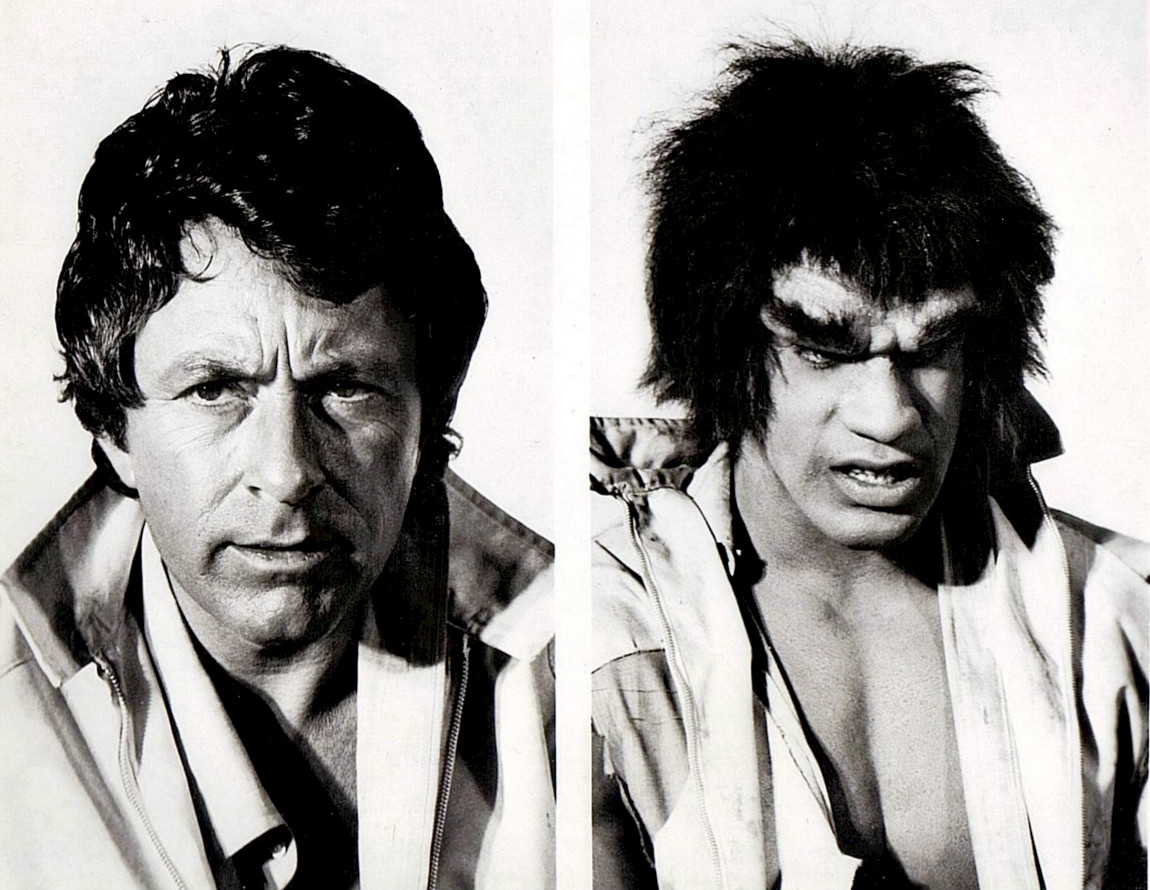
The Incredible Hulk transformation (Bixby on left, Ferrigno on right)

Hulk appeared in the 1978–1982 live action television series, The Incredible Hulk, and its subsequent television films. Created by Universal Studios, it starred Bill Bixby as Dr. David Banner and Lou Ferrigno as Hulk. Furthermore, vocal effects for the Hulk are provided by Ted Cassidy, with Charles Napier replacing him after Cassidy's death in 1979. In this series, David Banner becomes Hulk, is assumed dead and goes on the run while being pursued by tabloid investigative reporter Jack McGee (Jack Colvin) who is bent on proving that the creature exists. The two-hour pilot movie, which established the Hulk's origins, aired on November 4, 1977. The series was originally broadcast by CBS from March 10, 1978, to June 2, 1982, with eighty-two episodes in five seasons, and later followed by three television films.

=== Bill Bixby/Lou Ferrigno TV films (1977–1990) ===
- The Incredible Hulk (1977) - Pilot for the CBS series, written and directed by Kenneth Johnson (distributed in theaters in some countries).
- The Return of the Incredible Hulk (1977) – Pilot sequel directed by Alan J. Levi (also shown overseas as a feature film); retitled "Death in the Family" as a two-parter in syndication.
- Married (1978) – Two-hour season-two premiere episode directed by Kenneth Johnson (theatrically released outside of the United States as Hulk Returns or The Bride of the Incredible Hulk).
- The Incredible Hulk Returns (1988) – NBC resurrection of the characters from the series by Lou Ferrigno and Bill Bixby, with the addition of Eric Allan Kramer as the Asgardian Thor; directed by Nicholas Corea.
- The Trial of the Incredible Hulk (1989) – Sequel directed by Bill Bixby, with Rex Smith as Matt Murdock/Daredevil and John Rhys-Davies as Wilson Fisk/Kingpin. This film marks the first time Stan Lee appeared in a Marvel movie.
- The Death of the Incredible Hulk (1990) – Again directed by Bixby, this is the final installment of the television live-action franchise.
- Amazing Stories (1985 TV series) - A copy of the TV series Hulk played by Jake Steinfeld appears in the 10th episode, Remote Control Man, transferred from the TV set.

=== Hulk film (2003) ===
Evolution of the Hulk in film. (L to R): Hulk (2003), The Incredible Hulk (2008), The Avengers (2012)

The Hulk appears in a self-titled film (2003), portrayed by director Ang Lee via voice and motion capture, while Bruce Banner is portrayed by Eric Bana. This version initially works at the Lawrence Berkeley National Laboratory before being transformed into the Hulk after saving fellow employee Harper from a malfunctioning gammasphere, which combined with his mutations derived from his father's self-experimentation.

=== Marvel Cinematic Universe (2008–present) ===
Hulk in other media
- Marvel Cinematic Universe character

- Edward Norton portrays Bruce Banner in The Incredible Hulk (2008), with Lou Ferrigno providing the voice of the Hulk. Norton did not return to the role in The Avengers (2012), and was replaced by Mark Ruffalo. Ruffalo reprised the role of Banner in Avengers: Age of Ultron (2015), Thor: Ragnarok (2017), Avengers: Infinity War (2018), Avengers: Endgame (2019). and Spider-Man: Brand New Day (2026). Additionally, Ruffalo makes various cameo appearances as Banner in post-credits scenes for three films: Iron Man 3 (2013), Captain Marvel (2019), and Shang-Chi and the Legend of the Ten Rings (2021), with the latter two featuring him in the mid-credits scene and appears in Spider Man Brand New Day.
- Agents of S.H.I.E.L.D. (2013): The Hulk appears in the episode "Pilot" via archival footage from The Avengers.
- Daredevil (2015): A framed newspaper clipping showing an image of the Edward Norton portrayal of the Hulk from The Incredible Hulk, accompanied by the headline "Hulk emerges victorious in destructive uptown battle" appears in the background of Ben Urich's office throughout several episodes of the series' first season.
- Mark Ruffalo reprised his role as Bruce Banner in the Marvel Cinematic Universe animated series, What If...?.
- Ruffalo reprised his Bruce Banner/Hulk role in the She-Hulk: Attorney at Law television series.
- A variant of Hulk is seen fighting Wolverine in Deadpool & Wolverine before being interrupted by Wade Wilson of Earth-10005.

== Comic strips ==
- The Hulk appears in his own syndicated newspaper strip, named The Incredible Hulk which debuted on October 30, 1978, and ran until September 5, 1982, by King Features Syndicate.
- The Hulk appears in the Amazing Spider-Man strip.

== Fine arts ==
Starting with the Pop Art period and on a continuing basis since the 1960s, many comic book characters, including Hulk, have been "appropriated" by multiple visual artists and incorporated into contemporary artwork, most notably by Andy Warhol, Roy Lichtenstein, Dulce Pinzon, Jeff Koons, and others.

== Novels ==
Pocket Books published two mass market paperback solo novels starring the character, The Incredible Hulk: Stalker From the Stars in 1978 and The Incredible Hulk: Cry of the Beast in 1979. The Hulk has appeared in the following novels:

Title	Author	Publisher	ISBN	Release Date	Notes
The Incredible Hulk: Stalker From the Stars	Len Wein; Marv Wolfman; Joseph Silva	Pocket Books	0671820842 / 9780671820848	October 1978	Pocket Books series (1978–1979) #2
The Incredible Hulk: Cry of the Beast	Richard S. Meyers	Pocket Books	0671820850 / 9780671820855	March 1979	Pocket Books series (1978–1979) #3
The Marvel Superheroes	Len Wein; Marv Wolfman (editors)	Pocket Books	0671820915 / 9780671820916	August 1979	Pocket Books series (1978–1979) #9; short story collection; includes stories featuring the Avengers, Daredevil, the X-Men, and the Hulk
The Hulk and Spider-Man: Murdermoon	Paul Kupperberg	Pocket Books	067182094X / 9780671820947	October 1979	Pocket Books series (1978–1979) #11
The Incredible Hulk: What Savage Beast	Peter David	Putnam/BPMC (hardback); Berkley Boulevard/BPMC (paperback)	0756759676 / 9780756759674 (hardback); 1572971355 / 9781572971356 (paperback)	July 1995 (hardback); July 1996 (paperback)	
Spider-Man and the Incredible Hulk: Doom's Day Book One: Rampage	Danny Fingeroth; Eric Fein	Berkley Boulevard/BPMC	1572971649 / 9781572971646	September 1996	First in Doom's Day trilogy; is followed by Spider-Man and Iron Man: Doom's Day Book Two: Sabotage
The Incredible Hulk: Abominations	Jason Henderson	Berkley Boulevard/BPMC	1572972734 / 9781572972735	July 1997	
The Ultimate Hulk	Stan Lee; Peter David (editors)	Berkley Boulevard/BPMC	0425165132 / 9780425165133	October 1998	Short story collection
Hulk	Peter David	Del Rey Books	0345459679 / 9780345459671	April 2003	Novelization of the 2003 Hulk movie
The Incredible Hulk	Peter David	Del Rey Books	0345506995 / 978-0345506993	May 2008	Novelization of the 2008 The Incredible Hulk movie

== Video games ==
The Hulk's first appearance in a video game was the 1984 graphic adventure computer game Questprobe featuring The Hulk, and the character began making appearances on home and handheld consoles a decade later. An earlier game was originally planned by Parker Brothers for the Atari 2600 in 1983, but was canceled in the midst of the video game crash. Several companies have developed games based on the Hulk, including Adventure International, Probe Entertainment, Attention to Detail, Radical Entertainment, Edge of Reality, and Amaze Entertainment. The Hulk's standalone titles are often action games that pit the Hulk against supervillains in a beat 'em up format, with Bruce Banner occasionally appearing for stealth or puzzle elements. Apart from his standalone titles, the Hulk also appears in several other Marvel titles within an ensemble cast; in these appearances, he is occasionally accompanied by members of his own supporting cast, such as Abomination and She-Hulk.

== Podcasts ==
An Old Man Logan version of Hulk appears in Marvel's Wastelanders, voiced by Blake Morris in the "Star-Lord" segment and by Danny Burstein in the "Doom" segment.

== Live performances ==
- The Hulk was one of the superheroes portrayed in the 1987 live adaptation of the Spider-Man and Mary Jane Watson's wedding performed at Shea Stadium.
- The Hulk appears in the Marvel Universe Live! stage show.

== Miscellaneous ==
- The Hulk appeared in an LP produced by Power Records in 1974, entitled The Incredible Hulk at Bay!, an audio dramatisation of Incredible Hulk #171.
- The Planet Hulk storyline was adapted from the novelisation as a dramatised audiobook by GraphicAudio.
