= List of science fiction television programs, I =

This is an inclusive list of science fiction television programs whose names begin with the letter I.

== I ==
Live-action

- Ijon Tichy: Space Pilot (2007, Germany)
- Immortal, The (1970–1971)
- Immortal, The (2000, Canada) IMDb
- Incorporated (2016–2017)
- Incredible Hulk, The (franchise):
  - Incredible Hulk, The (1977–1982)
  - Incredible Hulk Returns, The (1988, film)
  - Trial of the Incredible Hulk, The (1989, film)
  - Death of the Incredible Hulk, The (1990, film)
- Infinite Worlds of H. G. Wells, The a.k.a. The Scientist (2001, UK/US, miniseries, anthology)
- Inhumans (2017)
- Intergalactic (2021, UK)
- Interpretaris, The (1966) IMDb
- Interster (1983, South Africa, puppetry)
- Into the Badlands (2015–2018)
- Intruders (1992, film)
- Invaders, The (1967–1968)
- Invaders from Space (1964, film)
- Invasion (1997, film)
- Invasion (2005–2006)
- Invasion (2021–present)
- Invasion: Earth (1998, UK)
- Invisible Man, The (franchise):
  - Invisible Man, The (1958, UK)
  - Invisible Man, The (1975)
  - Invisible Man, The (1984, UK)
  - Invisible Man, The (2000)
- Iron King (1972–1973, Japan)
- Island City (1994, film, pilot)
- It's About Time (1966–1967)

Animation

- Incredible Hulk, The (1982–1983, animated)
  - Incredible Hulk, The a.k.a. Incredible Hulk and She-Hulk, The (1996–1997, animated)
  - Hulk and the Agents of S.M.A.S.H. (2013–2015, animated)
- Infinite Ryvius (1999–2000, Japan, animated)
- Infinite Stratos (2011–2013, Japan, animated)
- Inhumanoids (1986, animated)
- Inspector Gadget (franchise):
  - Inspector Gadget (1983–1986, Canada/France/Japan/US, animated)
  - Inspector Gadget Saves Christmas (1992, animated)
  - Gadget Boy & Heather (1995, France, animated)
  - Inspector Gadget's Field Trip (1996–1998, animated)
  - Gadget and the Gadgetinis (2001–2003, Canada, animated)
  - Inspector Gadget (2015–2018, Canada/US, animated)
- Invader Zim (2001–2002, 2004, animated)
- Invasion America (1998, miniseries, animated)
- Invincible Steel Man Daitarn 3 a.k.a. Unchallengeable Daitarn 3, The (1978–1979, Japan, animated)
- Invincible Super Man Zambot 3 a.k.a. Super Machine Zambot 3 (1977–1978, Japan, animated)
- Invisible Man, The (2005, France, animated)
- Iron Man (franchise):
  - Iron Man (1994–1996, animated)
  - Iron Man: Armored Adventures (2009–2012, animated)
  - Marvel Anime: Iron Man (2010, Japan, animated)
- Irresponsible Captain Tylor, The (1993–1996, Japan, animated)
