= List of unproduced television projects based on Marvel Comics =

This is a list of unmade and unreleased television projects based on Marvel Comics. Some of these productions were, or still are, in development hell. Projects that have not provided significant production announcements within at least a year would be considered in development limbo until further announcements are released. The following include live-action and animated productions created for television. Along with Marvel Comics properties, projects based on their imprints (Icon Comics, Malibu Comics, CrossGen, Star Comics, Razorline, and Epic Comics) are included.

== Live-action ==
=== Richard Egan's Namor ===
In the 1950s, a television series based on the character Namor was planned, starring Richard Egan, but it never finished production.

=== Sub-Mariner ===
In the early 1970s, a different Namor/Sub-Mariner television pilot was in development, but never finished filming due to the similarity of the short-lived Man from Atlantis series.

=== Daredevil and the Black Widow ===
In 1975, Angela Bowie secured the TV rights to Daredevil and Black Widow for a duration of one year and planned a TV series based on the two characters. Bowie had photographer Terry O'Neill take a series of pictures of her as Black Widow and actor Ben Carruthers as Daredevil (with wardrobe by Natasha Kornilkoff) to shop the project around to producers, but the project never came to fruition.

=== Daredevil ===
In 1983, ABC planned a live-action Daredevil pilot. Academy Award-winning writer Stirling Silliphant completed the draft of the program, but it was not aired.

=== The Amazing Spider-Man revival ===
In a 2002 interview with SFX magazine, Nicholas Hammond revealed that there were plans to do a reunion movie for The Amazing Spider-Man series in 1984. The proposal would have had the original cast team up with the cast of The Incredible Hulk television series (a major hit for CBS), with Hammond appearing in the black Spider-Man costume. According to Hammond, a deal was arranged to have Columbia and Universal Studios co-produce the project. Bill Bixby was going to direct the TV-movie, in addition to reprising the role of David Banner. However, Universal eventually cancelled the project. Hammond said he was told that Lou Ferrigno was unavailable to reprise his role as the Hulk, because he was in Italy filming Hercules. However, in his 2003 autobiography My Incredible Life as the Hulk, Ferrigno stated that he was never contacted about the project, adding that he had recently finished filming Hercules II and that his availability was not an issue.

=== Dr. Strange ===
Philip DeGuere was given an ample budget for Dr. Strange, which he wrote, directed, and produced. The film was shot on Universal sets in Los Angeles, going over-schedule by several days because of the special effects, which included a lot of the era's green screen. Friend and composer Paul Chiraha was encouraged to produce an electronic score. Chirara, interviewed in 2016, said that DeGuere had high hopes for the film, and was crushed when it "tanked".

In January 1985, Stan Lee recounted the largely positive experience of working on Dr. Strange, compared with the other live-action Marvel Comics adaptations under the publisher's development deal with CBS and Universal Television in the late 1970s, saying, "I probably had the most input into that one. I've become good friends with the writer/producer Phil DeGuere. I was pleased with Dr. Strange and The [Incredible] Hulk. I think that Dr. Strange would have done much better than it did in the ratings except that it aired opposite Roots. Those are the only experiences I've had with live-action television. Dr. Strange and The Hulk were fine. Captain America was a bit [of a] disappointment and Spider-Man was a total nightmare." CBS did not pick up Dr. Strange as a series.

=== Captain America ===
Both Captain America and Captain America II: Death Too Soon were intended as pilots for a follow-up TV series, however Universal Television lost the Captain America license shortly after the production of both films. Additionally the licensing fee had increased to $50,000 per episode compared to The Incredible Hulk's $2,500 per episode.

=== Thor ===
In 1988, Thor appeared in the live-action television film The Incredible Hulk Returns, which was meant to be a backdoor pilot episode for a live-action Thor series. Thor was played by Eric Allan Kramer, and Donald Blake by Steve Levitt.

=== Daredevil (The Incredible Hulk spin-off) ===
As was the case with The Incredible Hulk Returns, the 1989 telefilm The Trial of the Incredible Hulk also acted as a backdoor television pilot for a series for Daredevil, but went unproduced for unknown reasons. Rex Smith portrayed Matt Murdock / Daredevil in the backdoor pilot.

=== She-Hulk ===
She-Hulk was announced as co-star of an October 1989 made-for-TV film headlining the Incredible Hulk, the 3rd reunion/sequel to the live-action Incredible Hulk series with Bill Bixby and Lou Ferrigno reprising their roles. Although no specific title or actress was announced, in early July of that year, it was still firmly expected to air that autumn. A third Hulk telefilm did appear in February 1990 without any additional Marvel character adaptation. A year later, a proposed She-Hulk series for the ABC network was "dead."

=== The Revenge of the Incredible Hulk ===
Despite the Hulk's death in the 1990 film, the movie's makers had intended from the start for him to return in The Revenge of the Incredible Hulk, again with Gerald Di Pego as writer. In early July 1989, Iron Man was planned to make a brief appearance. As of July 10, 1990, a script was being written. It has been reported that the fourth film would have featured the Hulk with Banner's mind, and that the project was canceled because Bill Bixby struggled with cancer, but Di Pego has refuted both these claims as fan rumors, pointing out that Bixby's health had not yet begun to decline at the time the film was canceled. Di Pego said that the plot for The Revenge of the Incredible Hulk began with Banner being revived, but no longer able to change into the Hulk. Banner then begins to work for the government in order to prevent accidents like the one that turned him into the Hulk, but is captured by villains and coerced into turning their agents into Hulk-like beings. According to Di Pego, at the film's climax, Banner would be forced to recreate the accident that transformed him into the Hulk to stop the villains' plans. The sequel was canceled because of the disappointing ratings for The Death of the Incredible Hulk.

=== Untitled Hulk series ===
In 2010, Marvel Television and ABC announced plans for a new live-action Hulk TV series, with Guillermo del Toro and David Eick attached as developers and executive producers. In 2012, Del Toro confirmed that the project was on hold, with little progress having been made. By 2013, Marvel Television head Jeph Loeb stated that the series was "on pause."

=== Power Pack ===
Following the cancellation of the original comic, Paragon Entertainment Corporation and New World Television developed Power Pack into a live-action show for NBC's Saturday Morning Kids block. While a pilot episode was made, the series was passed on, and the pilot was later picked up by Fox, which chose to broadcast it as a Saturday morning special, on September 28, 1991, rather than ordering an entire series. The 27-minute pilot has subsequently been aired a few times on Fox Kids during the off-season. Minor alterations to the concept were made for the pilot, ranging from the children's parents being aware of their superhuman abilities, Julie's acceleration power being altered to her being able to move at superhuman speed, without the ability to fly, and the "cloud" aspect of Jack's density power being eliminated; he was only able to shrink in size. The children did not wear costumes.

=== Stealth Warriors ===
In November 1993, Rick Ungar was developing Stealth Warriors for Marvel.

=== Artisan Entertainment Television Shows ===
On May 16, 2000, Marvel entered into a deal with Artisan Entertainment to produce 13 movies and 2 television series, those being Captain America and Thor.

=== Bloodstone ===
In 2001, a Ulysses Bloodstone-centered TV series was in development.

=== Daughters of the Dragon ===
An intended Daughters of the Dragon TV series was in development in March 2001 by Marvel Studios and Tribune Entertainment, The series would have featured Colleen Wing and two other Daughters, but not Misty Knight. The series was never produced, with Wing and Knight eventually making their debut appearances in the shared universe of Marvel's Netflix series.

=== Black Cat ===
Also in 2001, a planned TV show based on Black Cat was planned for Tribune Entertainment and Marvel Studios, but it never came to fruition.

=== Ectokid ===
In August 2001, Ectokid was planned as a television show to air on Nickelodeon. Clive Barker would have acted as an executive producer of the television show, with Daley and Murphy as producers. Talking to Daily Variety, Barker explained that he aimed to create "a franchisable world" for the studio, "of great, transcendent beauty; one that reconfigures people's expectations of what ghosts are, of what comes after death."

=== Night Thrasher ===
A Night Thrasher TV series was originally in early stages of development for UPN in 2002, before eventually being scrapped.

=== Brother Voodoo ===
In January 2003, Syfy ordered a live-action made-for-TV-movie and backdoor pilot based on the Marvel Comics supernatural character Brother Voodoo. Hans Rodionoff was announced to write the screenplay, set in New Orleans, of this Reveille Productions and Marvel Studios co-production executive produced by Reveille head Ben Silverman and Marvel Studios' Avi Arad and Rick Ungar.

=== 1000 Days ===
In January 2003, Syfy also announced it was developing 1000 Days, a live-action television film and backdoor pilot, based on the Marvel Comic series Strikeforce: Morituri, in which near-future soldiers gain enhanced abilities but die 1,000 days later. Written by Art Marcum and Matt Holloway, it was a Reveille Productions and Marvel Studios co-production executive produced by Reveille head Ben Silverman and Marvel Studios' Avi Arad and Rick Ungar.

=== Skrull Kill Krew ===
In 2006, a television series based on Skrull Kill Krew was in development. At some point in time, Marvel ceased development for unknown reasons.

=== Alter Ego ===
In 2006, a television series based on Alias was in development. At some point in time, production was halted for unknown reasons. In 2015, a different adaptation of Alias was produced by Netflix, which was developed by Melissa Rosenberg for ABC Studios and Marvel Television. The name change was needed due to the unrelated ABC series Alias.

=== Moon Knight ===
According to author Doug Moench, a Moon Knight series was licensed by Toei in the late 1970s for production in Japan, but was instead serialized as a manga from 1979-1980. In 2006, Marvel Studios and No Equal Entertainment announced a live-action Moon Knight TV series. Writer Jon Cooksey confirmed in 2008 that he was developing the Moon Knight television series. In August 2019, a different Moon Knight series was announced for Disney+, set in the Marvel Cinematic Universe.

=== FX's Powers ===
In 2009, Brian Michael Bendis confirmed plans to develop a Powers television show on FX as well as his involvement as the writer of the pilot for the show. In February 2011, a greenlit pilot of the show scripted by Charles H. Eglee was announced as a co-production by Sony Pictures Television and FX Networks. Charles S. Dutton became the first cast member in May 2011 when he signed on to play Captain Cross. In June, 2011, filming in Chicago was scheduled to start within a few weeks. The following week, Lucy Punch was cast as Deena Pilgrim. Katee Sackhoff had campaigned for the part. Although FX was rumored to be courting Kyle Chandler for the part of Walker, the next day Jason Patric was cast in the part. Later in June, Carly Foulkes was cast as RetroGirl and Bailee Madison was cast as Calista. Filming began in Chicago in early July 2011 and ended in early August. In November 2011, FX announced that it would reshoot the Powers pilot. Bendis tweeted that "the reshoots are planned for January and are all about tone and clarity". In April 2012, more scripts were ordered and writing continued, but more reshoots and recasting were being discussed by the network. Work on this project halted, when on March 19, 2014, it was announced that Powers would become the first original television series from the PlayStation Network, with a different cast and writers. The new series premiered on March 10, 2015.

=== Dreadstar ===
On February 17, 2015, Jim Starlin teamed with Universal Cable Productions to adapt Dreadstar as a scripted TV series with Chris Bender and J. C. Spink as producers.

=== Empire of the Dead ===
In May 2015, Empire of the Dead was being planned as an adaptation of George A. Romero's comic series. The series was going to be written and executive produced by Romero and Peter Grunwald. Demarest executives Sam Englebardt and William D. Johnson would have also executive-produced. In November 2015, AMC acquired the TV rights to the series.

=== Untitled comedy series ===
In January 2016, Stan Lee announced that an untitled comedy series was in the works.

=== Captain Britain ===
In March 2016, it was reported in the British media that Marvel had plans to start a new series starring Captain Britain.

=== Scarlet ===
In June 2016, Brian Michael Bendis was developing a TV series based on his comic series Scarlet for Cinemax.

=== Untitled Kingsman series ===
In June 2018, upon announcing his new film studio, Matthew Vaughn revealed that an eight-episode Kingsman television series was in early development at 20th Century Fox Television.

=== Marvel's Most Wanted ===
In July 2011, a Mockingbird series was in development at ABC Family. The original idea never materialized, and the character was introduced in the ABC series Agents of S.H.I.E.L.D., set in the Marvel Cinematic Universe.

By April 2015, Marvel Television was developing a spin-off series from Agents of S.H.I.E.L.D. to be developed by that series' executive producer Jeffrey Bell and writer Paul Zbyszewski, and would follow storylines that occurred at the end of Agents of S.H.I.E.L.D.'s second season, with its own pilot planned. Adrianne Palicki and Nick Blood entered negotiations to star in the series as their ex-spies and ex-spouses Bobbi Morse and Lance Hunter, respectively. ABC passed on the spin-off in early May, but that August, it was revived as Marvel's Most Wanted with a pilot order. Bell and Zbyszewski returned to develop the series and to co-write the pilot, with it focusing on Morse and Hunter as they are on the run trying to uncover a conspiracy against them without S.H.I.E.L.D.'s help, and partner with rogue adventurer Dominic Fortune. In May 2016, ABC again passed on the series.

=== Untitled Eternals series ===
By mid-April 2015, Marvel Television and screenwriter John Ridley were developing a series to reinvent an existing Marvel character or property for ABC, and in January 2016, Ridley confirmed it was in development and that it would incorporate the "socially conscious nature" of the Marvel Netflix series Jessica Jones and his series American Crime to it while still being direct entertainment. A year later, ABC Entertainment president Channing Dungey revealed Ridley was rewriting his script, with Ridley saying this was so the series brings something different to viewers of superhero television series to fill an area not explored by Marvel and hoped the series was nearing creation. By August 2017, Dungey was unsure if Ridley was still working on the project, and was confirmed to have "fizzled" in December 2019 when Marvel Television was shut down and folded into Marvel Studios.

In January 2024, John Ridley confirmed on the Comic Book Club podcast that the untitled series was based on the Marvel property "Eternals", which received a live-action movie adaptation in 2021. Ridley confirmed that the project is "not in the works anymore". Ridley proceeded to describe his take as "so f–king weird," and repeatedly contextualised that "but good" comparison. "There was my version, a good version, which is good to me…. which doesn't mean anything," he told the Comic Book Club podcast hosts. Eventually, "There was the version that [Marvel] ended up doing which… I don't think that version was particularly good—I'll be honest—and for all kinds of reasons."

=== Damage Control ===
By October 2015, Marvel Television and ABC Studios were developing a half-hour live-action comedy series based on the overworked and underpaid Damage Control clean-up crew that was mentioned in Agents of S.H.I.E.L.D., with Ben Karlin serving as the series showrunner and executive producer. The group were introduced as the "Department of Damage Control" in Spider-Man: Homecoming with Tyne Daly portraying head of department Anne Marie Hoag. The series was no longer moving forward by December 2019.

=== Untitled Allan Heinberg-developed series ===
In September 2018, ABC gave a production commitment to a series featuring lesser-known female superheroes, to be written by Allan Heinberg who would executive produce it with Marvel Television head Jeph Loeb, with the hope for it to be a "strong contender from the get-go". However, in February 2019, ABC cancelled their plans.

=== Netflix series ===
On November 29, 2018, Netflix revealed that Daredevil was cancelled. In 2020, the former showrunner presented his plans for a fourth and fifth season, including the introduction of Owl, Gladiator, Typhoid Mary, and the return of Bullseye.

In a 2022 interview, Finn Jones revealed Iron Fist Season 3 would have focused on course-correcting the show and somewhat adapting the Immortal Iron Fist storyline and co-starring the character Orson Randall.

On January 31, 2024, Luke Cage's former showrunner revealed the titles for the third season's episodes.

=== Other ABC series ===
In January 2016, Paul Lee announced ABC Studios was developing a second comedy series with Marvel after Damage Control with the hope that it would air on ABC. In August 2019, ABC Entertainment president Karey Burke stated that ABC was in active discussions with Marvel regarding "one project in particular" that would be "something brand new, mostly" and be a female-focused superhero series. This project was separate from the female-focused superhero series developed for ABC by Allan Heinberg earlier in 2019. Deadline Hollywood reported plans for the series had "stalled" by January 2020, a month after Marvel Television announced they were no longer developing new series.

=== New Warriors ===
By late August 2016, Marvel Television and ABC Studios were developing a half-hour comedy series based on the New Warriors team and featuring Squirrel Girl. In April 2017, Freeform announced a straight-to-series order for Marvel's New Warriors with 10 episodes to be developed by showrunner Kevin Biegel who was writing the first script. It was set to focus on Doreen Green / Squirrel Girl, Craig Hollis / Mister Immortal, Dwayne Taylor / Night Thrasher, Robbie Baldwin / Speedball, Zach Smith / Microbe, and Deborah Fields / Debrii. That June, the cast was revealed with Milana Vayntrub starring as Doreen Green / Squirrel Girl and Derek Theler as Craig Hollis / Mister Immortal. In November, Freeform was announced to no longer air the series as it was being shopped to other networks, with Marvel aiming to air it in 2018. By September 2019, the series had been unable to find a new broadcaster and was officially considered dead.

=== New Warriors spin-offs ===
After ordering New Warriors in April 2017, Burke said Freeform was "absolutely" interested in creating spinoff series for each of the characters on the New Warriors team, in a similar fashion to Marvel's Netflix television series, explaining that the characters Marvel chose for the team "are all really singular and could each carry the show that they're on. They're bound together ... for as long as we choose with this show, but it's conceptually tailor-made for spinoffs." These potential spin-offs were still considered likely when Marvel began looking for a new broadcaster for New Warriors. Marvel Television was no longer developing any new series in December 2019.

=== Ghost Rider ===
Hulu ordered a Ghost Rider series in May 2019, with Ingrid Escajeda set as showrunner and executive producer alongside Agents of S.H.I.E.L.D.'s Paul Zbyszewski and Loeb, and Luna reprising his role. Rather than being a traditional spin-off from S.H.I.E.L.D., Hulu described the series as a new story that "lives unto its own" but is about the same character. It was intended to be part of a group of shows dubbed Adventure into Fear and included Helstrom. In September, Hulu chose not to move forward with the project due to creative differences.

== Animated ==
=== Ant-Man and the Wasp ===
In the 1980s, an Ant-Man and the Wasp animated series was in development, but was eventually abandoned.

=== Iron Man ===
In 1980, an Iron Man TV series was one of several pitches, resulting in an unaired pilot and an abandoned prospect of a full-fledged series.

=== Daredevil and Lightning the Super-Dog ===
In the 1980s, ABC had planned a Daredevil animated television series that would have featured a guide dog named "Lightning the Super-Dog". Television writer Mark Evanier said in 2008 that he was the last in a line of writers to have written a pilot and series bible, with his including Lightning as a guide dog without superpowers. Production stills for a proposed Daredevil animated series meant to air on Fox Kids were made.

=== The Young Astronauts ===
In 1985, The Young Astronauts, produced by Marvel Productions, concerned a 21st-century family aboard the interplanetary transport ship Courageous, along with their cat and a comical maintenance "droid". It was slated to be a Saturday-morning midseason replacement on CBS. A Star Comics comic book series from Marvel Comics was planned to be released before the cartoon, but was also canceled for the same reason. An advertisement that appeared in many comic books in 1986, which promoted the upcoming fall lineup for CBS Saturday morning, prominently featured a drawing of The Young Astronauts along with other shows set to air that fall. The show never aired due to the Space Shuttle Challenger disaster, causing CBS to cancel the show before it finished production.

=== X-Men: Pryde of the X-Men ===
TV-pilot that was intended to launch a series. Funding for this pilot came from the budget for RoboCop: The Animated Series. Instead of making a 13th episode of RoboCop, Marvel Productions decided to use their funding to have Toei Animation produce the animation for this pilot. Shortly after this pilot was delivered, Marvel started having financial issues (New World Pictures, who purchased the Marvel Entertainment Group or MEG from Cadence Industries in 1986, sold MEG in January 1989 to the Andrews Group) and stopped work on just about everything but Muppet Babies.

=== Solarman ===
In 1988, a 22-minute animated Solarman pilot was produced, which its creator David Oliphant maintained ownership of, since he produced over $400,000 for its production, with Marvel acting as a licensee. It was released on VHS as a cross-promotion tie-in with the first issue of Marvel Comics' adaptation. The pilot finally aired on October 24, 1992, as a special on Fox Kids, a week before the debut of the X-Men animated series. According to Oliphant, a major studio offered $15 million to create 64 animated episodes of Solarman, but the studio cancelled this offer soon after on the advice of their consultants, who cautioned that Saturday morning superhero cartoons would soon die out in popularity.

=== Ruby-Spears Thor ===
Artwork by Jack Kirby from a planned Thor animated series, in the 1980s, by Ruby-Spears Productions has surfaced.

=== Mort the Dead Teenager ===
In late 1996, Wizard had reported on a potential primetime adaptation of the 4-issue miniseries Mort the Dead Teenager in negotiations to be broadcast on UPN. A leaked pilot script, titled "Death Pays All Debts...Except For Mort's", written by X-Men Evolution head writer Greg Johnson, was uploaded to the Internet Archive on April 3rd, 2026. Compared to the miniseries' unproduced film adaptation, this version would have been more faithful to the original story, with characters Slick and Weirdo being prominently involved in the plot alongside Mort's family.

=== Captain America ===
In the 1990s, a planned Captain America animated series from Saban Entertainment to air on Fox Kids proposed that Captain America's true name was Tommy Tompkins, with "Steve Rogers" being a cover name assigned to him by the U.S. Army. The Red Skull would appear as the main antagonist. The series was cancelled during production with scripts written, characters designed and a one-minute pitch film produced, because of Marvel's bankruptcy.

=== Rocket Racer ===
In 2006, writer Rick Remender pitched an animated Rocket Racer television series for Marvel, but it got canceled for unknown reasons just as it was completely outlined.

=== Marvel Era ===
In 2012-2013, Powerhouse Animation Studios pitched an idea for an animated Marvel series titled Marvel Era. The shorts series was to be made in time with Marvel's 75th anniversary and would have consisted of standalone stories focusing on different Marvel characters in different eras with different animation styles. CEO Brad Graeber revealed that 14 concepts were pitched including, "A 40's Captain America D-Day story in the style of Fleischer Studios, a Sub-Mariner U-boat story, a 60's X-Men story that featured a mutant who led a cult with his powers. There was also a very cinema 70's Luke Cage and Iron Fist, an 80's Punisher story that leaned into Scarface and Miami Vice, and a Deadpool story made based on cheesy 90's cartoons." The project was cancelled due to the then-current shift in management at Marvel, following The Walt Disney Company's purchase. In 2021, Graeber revealed the animation test that was pitched to Marvel.

=== The Offenders Hulu series ===
In February 2019, Hulu ordered adult animated Marvel series based on MODOK, Hit-Monkey, Tigra and Dazzler, and Howard the Duck, leading up to a crossover special titled The Offenders. In January 2020, Marvel decided not to move forward with Howard the Duck, Tigra & Dazzler, and The Offenders, with M.O.D.O.K. and Hit Monkey continuing as planned.

=== Morgana le Fay series ===
Ben Balistreri once pitched a series starring Morgan le Fay to Marvel and Disney Television Animation. The series would have centered on a teenage Billie Eilish-esque Morgana creating a nefarious plot with help from her "crow-nies". However, the pitch was rejected.

== See also ==
- List of television series based on Marvel Comics publications
- Marvel Comics Video Library
