= Marvel Television =

Television production company (2010–2019)

- Type: Division (2010–2019); Label of Marvel Studios (2019–present)
- Industry: Television
- Genre: Superhero
- Founded: June 28, 2010; 16 years ago
- Defunct: December 10, 2019; 6 years ago
- Fate: Folded into Marvel Studios
- Successor: Marvel Studios
- Headquarters: 500 South Buena Vista Street, Burbank, California, United States
- Key people: Jeph Loeb (EVP); Karim Zreik (SVP)
- Products: Television series
- Parent: Marvel Entertainment (2010–2019); Marvel Studios (2019–present)
- Website: www.marvel.com/tv-shows

Marvel Television was an American television production company responsible for live-action and animated television shows and direct-to-DVD series based on characters from Marvel Comics. Marvel Television was formed as a division of Marvel Entertainment in June 2010, with producer Jeph Loeb serving as its executive vice president and head of television to produce shows for Marvel. The division was based at affiliate ABC Studios' location, and collaborated with the broadcast network ABC, streaming services Netflix and Hulu, and cable channel Freeform to release many of their series as a part of the Marvel Cinematic Universe (MCU) media franchise, a shared universe created by the film studio Marvel Studios. Animated series from Marvel Television were produced through Marvel Animation, and the division also collaborated with 20th Century Fox to produce shows based on the X-Men franchise such as Legion and The Gifted.

Marvel Television and Marvel Studios were separated in August 2015, before this division was transferred to Marvel Studios from Marvel Entertainment in October 2019 and was folded into the former two months later. The "Marvel Television" name is currently used as a separate brand and production label by Marvel Studios.

== Background ==
Marvel Entertainment Group previously licensed some of their characters for television series, with animated shows often becoming more successful than their live-action counterparts. Marvel's first live-action television licenses were for the character Spider-Man to appear in the "Spidey Super Stories" segments of The Electric Company (1974–1977), the CBS series The Amazing Spider-Man (1977–1979), and Toei's tokusatsu–style series Spider-Man (1978–1979). The Amazing Spider-Man pulled in reasonable ratings but was canceled in 1979 by CBS as they did not want to be known as the "comic book" network due to them already broadcasting three other comic book-based series, and chose to instead focus on their series The Incredible Hulk (1978–1982), which was produced with Universal Television, as it had better ratings and was Marvel's only successful live-action series, running for five seasons.

The 1978 television film Dr. Strange was intended to serve as a television pilot for the Doctor Strange character, similar to what had been done for Spider-Man and the Hulk. Two pilots were also released for Captain America in 1979, Captain America and Captain America II: Death Too Soon. None of these pilots were picked up. After The Incredible Hulk ended in 1982, live-action shows did not come into fruition often. Instead, the live-action television film The Incredible Hulk Returns (1988) was designed as a backdoor pilot for Thor, while The Trial of the Incredible Hulk (1989) acted as a backdoor pilot for Daredevil, and was followed by The Death of the Incredible Hulk in 1990. Three direct pilots were produced in the 1990s, Power Pack, Generation X, and Nick Fury: Agent of S.H.I.E.L.D., although none of these were picked up for series. Marvel had better luck in syndicating their properties in the late 1990s and early 2000s with Night Man and Mutant X, which respectively lasted for two and three seasons. The latter show spawned a lawsuit from 20th Century Fox, which held the film rights for the X-Men. The last series licensed by Marvel was Blade: The Series, a spin-off from and follow-up to the Blade film series. That series was produced by New Line Television for the cable channel Spike and was canceled after its first season in 2006.

== History ==
=== Marvel Entertainment division (2010–2019) ===
==== Formation and early work ====
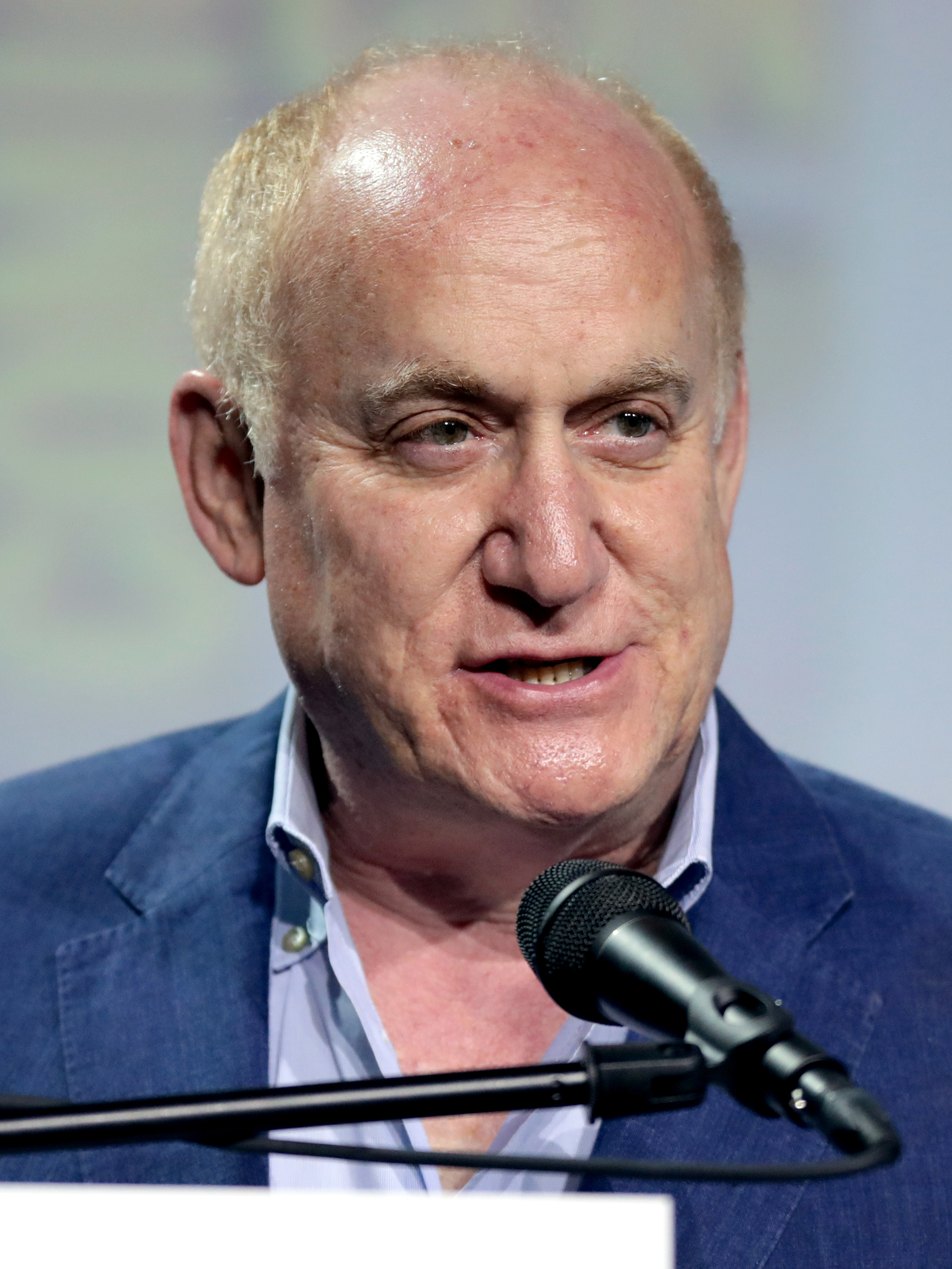
Jeph Loeb led Marvel Television, and served as executive producer of every television series on ABC, Netflix, Hulu, and Freeform.

On June 28, 2010, Marvel Entertainment announced the start of Marvel Television, together with the appointment of Jeph Loeb to head up the division as executive vice president and the head of television. In October 2010, it was announced that the first live-action television series from Marvel Television for ABC would be centered on the Hulk, developed by Guillermo del Toro. In December 2010, it was revealed that Melissa Rosenberg was developing AKA Jessica Jones, based on the comic book series Alias and centered on Jessica Jones, for ABC, intended to air in 2011 of the 2011–2012 television season. At San Diego Comic-Con in 2011, Loeb revealed, in addition to the Hulk project and AKA Jessica Jones, Marvel Television also had Cloak and Dagger and Mockingbird in development at ABC Family. In October 2011, ABC Studios sold a Punisher script to Fox, who gave the project a put-pilot commitment. In April 2012, Marvel Television signed with Creative Artists Agency for live-action representation. In May 2012, it was announced that the Hulk project was not ready for the 2012–2013 season, and would possibly be for the 2013–2014 season. It was also announced that ABC had passed on AKA Jessica Jones. In July 2012, it was reported that Marvel had again entered into discussions with ABC to create a show set in the Marvel Cinematic Universe, and in August 2012, ABC ordered a pilot to be written by Joss Whedon, Jed Whedon, and Maurissa Tancharoen and directed by Joss Whedon, which became Agents of S.H.I.E.L.D. It was officially ordered to series on May 10, 2013. By September 2013, Marvel was developing a series inspired by the Agent Carter Marvel One-Shot, featuring Peggy Carter, with Deadline Hollywood reporting it was one of several series in development at Marvel.

By October 2013, Marvel was preparing four drama series and a miniseries, totaling 60 episodes, to present to video on demand services and cable providers, with Netflix, Amazon, and WGN America expressing interest. In November 2013, it was announced that Disney would provide Netflix with live-action series starting in 2015, based on Daredevil, Jessica Jones, Iron Fist, and Luke Cage, leading up to a miniseries based on the Defenders. Responding to the Netflix announcement, Disney CEO Bob Iger said that Daredevil, Luke Cage, Iron Fist and Jessica Jones may appear on film if their shows are successful and that another outlet was chosen as ABC and Disney XD could not handle all Marvel shows. Disney was set to spend approximately $200 million in financing for the series. The four Netflix shows are set in the Marvel Cinematic Universe. It was also revealed in November 2013 that the Hulk project first announced in 2010 had been shelved, with Loeb saying, when "we saw what Joss Whedon and Mark Ruffalo were creating in The Avengers, that was a better solution". Additionally, Del Toro wanted to create a more violent take on the character than what ABC was hoping to achieve with the series. On May 8, 2014, ABC officially renewed Agents of S.H.I.E.L.D. for a second season and ordered Marvel's Agent Carter straight to series, which later aired in January 2015.

In early April 2015, two unspecified shows were said to be in development to air on ABC: one was a spin-off series of Agents of S.H.I.E.L.D. centered on Bobbi Morse (Adrianne Palicki) and Lance Hunter (Nick Blood), which was being developed by Bell and writer Paul Zbyszewski based on storylines occurring at the end of the second season, and would receive its own pilot rather than a backdoor pilot; and another with writer-producer John Ridley. On May 7, 2015, ABC renewed Agents of S.H.I.E.L.D. and Agent Carter for a third and second season, respectively. Additionally, ABC also passed on the Agents of S.H.I.E.L.D. spinoff, though ABC Entertainment president Paul Lee did not rule out returning to the spin-off in the future, and Lee also confirmed that Ridley was working on a Marvel property for ABC. Also in May, Iger indicated that Disney saw potential in creating a streaming service dedicated to Marvel content as a way to further "take product... directly to consumer". In August 2015, the Agents of S.H.I.E.L.D. spin-off series received new life as a reworked series, titled Marvel's Most Wanted, with a pilot order. Bell and Zbyszewski once again developed the series, while also serving as co-writers of the pilot, executive producers, and showrunners, with Loeb also attached as executive producer. The series would still focus on Morse and Hunter, with Palicki and Blood both attached, but is no longer intended to be a true spin-off of Agents of S.H.I.E.L.D. as previously believed, instead "being described as a new take focusing on the same duo and their continuing adventures."

==== Split from Marvel Studios, further work, and series cancellations ====
At the end of August 2015, Marvel Entertainment's film subsidiary Marvel Studios was integrated into Walt Disney Studios, leaving Marvel Television and Marvel Animation (formerly part of Marvel Studios) under Marvel Entertainment and CEO Isaac Perlmutter's control. In October 2015, ABC ordered a put pilot for a half-hour live-action comedy series Damage Control, based on the comics construction company of the same name. The series is being developed by Ben Karlin. Later in the month, FX ordered a pilot for Legion, about David Haller, a young man who may be more than human. The pilot was produced by FX Productions (FXP) and Marvel Television, with FXP handling the physical production. Also in October, Fox Broadcasting Company announced that 20th Century Fox Television and Marvel Television were developing a series titled Hellfire Club, based on the secret society from the comics of the same name. In January 2016, Lee stated the Most Wanted pilot would begin production "in the next few months" and announced that a second Marvel comedy series was in development in addition to Damage Control. Also in January, Netflix was in the early stages of developing a Punisher television series starring Jon Bernthal, who appeared in the second season of Daredevil. More information was revealed regarding the Legion series, including that in addition to the pilot, FX had ordered several scripts and that it would not take place in the established X-Men film universe but in a parallel universe instead. Should the series be picked up, it would consist of 10 episodes and is expected to air in 2016. In April 2016, the Disney-owned network Freeform greenlit Cloak & Dagger with a straight-to-series order as Marvel's first work with ABC Signature. The series, which is set in the MCU, premiered in 2018. At the end of the month, Marvel and Netflix officially picked up the series, The Punisher, with Bernthal attached to reprise his role as the lead character.

In May 2016, ABC cancelled Agent Carter and passed on the pilot for Most Wanted. In July 2016, Fox and Marvel announced a put pilot order for an untitled series developed by Matt Nix and produced by 20th Century Fox and Marvel, with 20th Century Fox handling physical production. The series focuses on two ordinary parents who discover their children possess mutant powers, forcing them to run from the government and join an underground network of mutants. Nix served as an executive producer along with Bryan Singer, Lauren Shuler Donner, Simon Kinberg, Loeb and Jim Chory. It was also revealed that Hellfire Club was no longer in development. The following month, it was announced that Runaways had received a pilot order, along with additional scripts, from the streaming service Hulu, based on the team of the same name. The pilot is written by Josh Schwartz and Stephanie Savage, who also serve as executive producers and showrunners. By the end of the month, the division and ABC Studios were developing a half-hour comedy series based on the New Warriors featuring Squirrel Girl, with the series being offered to cable networks and streaming outlets. In April 2017, Freeform announced a straight-to-series order for the half-hour live-action series, Marvel's New Warriors, with the first season, consisting of 10 episodes, set to air in 2018. In May 2017, Hulu ordered Runaways to series with 10 episodes, to premiere on November 21, 2017.

In November 2016, Marvel Television and IMAX Corporation announced Inhumans, to be produced in conjunction with ABC Studios, and to air on ABC. The series, which is co-financed by IMAX and saw the first two episodes and select subsequent action sequences filmed with IMAX digital cameras, had versions of the first two episodes be screened in IMAX beginning September 1, 2017, for two weeks, before premiering on ABC on September 29. In May 2017, Fox ordered the Matt Nix TV series, now titled The Gifted, to series, and FXX placed a series order for an adult animated series based on Deadpool, to be co-produced by Marvel Television, FX Productions and ABC Signature Studios. Donald Glover and his brother Stephen Glover would serve as showrunners, executive producers and writers for the series. In August 2017, senior vice president of original programming Karim Zreik indicated that Marvel Television was working with ABC on a "Jessica Jones–esque" female-focused show. By November 2017, Disney was developing a Marvel series specifically for release on its new Disney+ streaming service, which it planned to launch before the end of 2019. By March 2018, the Deadpool series was no longer in development. In May 2018, ABC cancelled Inhumans after one season. By September, Allan Heinberg began developing a Marvel series for ABC about female superheroes.

In October 2018, Netflix cancelled both Iron Fist and Luke Cage, each after two seasons, followed by the cancellation of Daredevil in November after three seasons. Luke Cage was cancelled due to third season financial terms, while Daredevil was due to Netflix looking to fund their own properties. Kevin A. Mayer, chairman of Walt Disney Direct-to-Consumer and International, indicated that he would consider the show for Disney+, but the Netflix-Marvel Television pact restricts the appearance of the four original characters from any non-Netflix series for two years after being canceled. This meant that 2020 would be the earliest that the shows could be revived on Disney+. In February 2019, it was announced that Legion would end after its third season. It was also revealed that Heinberg's series would not move forward at ABC. In addition, Hulu ordered four adult animated Marvel series leading up to a crossover special titled The Offenders, all to be executive produced by Loeb. Hulu also expressed interest in reviving the cancelled Netflix series. Netflix then cancelled both Jessica Jones and The Punisher. In August 2019, Loeb revealed Marvel Television was working on series for the streaming service Disney+.

=== Marvel Studios label (since 2019) ===
The logo for the Marvel Television label of Marvel Studios introduced in 2024

In October 2019, Marvel Studios president Kevin Feige was given the title of chief creative officer, Marvel, and would oversee Marvel Television and Marvel Family Entertainment (animation), with both being placed under the Marvel Studios banner. With the promotion of Feige, Loeb was expected to leave his post as the head of Marvel Television by Thanksgiving. On December 10, Marvel Television was folded into Marvel Studios, which inherited all of Marvel Television's shows that were in development at the time, and no new series were being considered from Marvel Television. In January 2022, Hulu's head of content, Craig Erwich, stated that additional seasons of M.O.D.O.K. and Hit Monkey, the two remaining series from Marvel Television, would be determined solely by the Marvel Studios team.

In May 2024, Marvel Studios revealed that its live-action Disney+ series would be released under a new "Marvel Television" banner, separate from the Marvel Television division, starting with Agatha All Along later in 2024. This was part of the studio's desire to help indicate to audiences that they did not have to watch all of the studio's projects to understand the overall story, and could choose which projects they wanted to follow, thus de-emphasizing the interconnected nature of the shared universe.

== Production library ==
=== Television series ===
Series	Released	No of seasons	Production partner(s)	Original network	Notes
Agents of S.H.I.E.L.D.	2013–2020	7	ABC Studios; Mutant Enemy Productions	ABC	
Agent Carter	2015–2016	2	ABC Studios; Fazekas & Butters	ABC	
Daredevil	2015–2018	3	ABC Studios; DeKnight Productions (season 1); Goddard Textiles	Netflix	
Jessica Jones	2015–2019	3	ABC Studios; Tall Girls Productions	Netflix	
Luke Cage	2016–2018	2	ABC Studios	Netflix	
Agents of S.H.I.E.L.D.: Slingshot	2016	1	ABC Studios	ABC.com	Mini episodes (3–6 minutes); part of the four Agents of S.H.I.E.L.D. web series
Legion	2017–2019	3	FX Productions; The Donners' Company; Bad Hat Harry Productions (season 1); Kinberg Genre; 26 Keys Productions	FX	Part of the X-Men franchise, not the Marvel Cinematic Universe
Iron Fist	2017–2018	2	ABC Studios; Devilina Productions (season 1)	Netflix	
The Defenders	2017	1	ABC Studios; Nine and a Half Fingers, Inc.; Goddard Textiles	Netflix	Miniseries
Inhumans	2017	1	ABC Studios; Devilina Productions; IMAX Entertainment (financer)	ABC	Versions of the first two episodes were screened in IMAX theaters
The Gifted	2017–2019	2	20th Century Fox Television; The Donners' Company; Bad Hat Harry Productions; Kinberg Genre; Flying Glass of Milk Productions	Fox	Part of the X-Men franchise, not the Marvel Cinematic Universe
The Punisher	2017–2019	2	ABC Studios; Bohemian Risk Productions	Netflix	
Runaways	2017–2019	3	ABC Signature Studios; Fake Empire	Hulu	
Cloak & Dagger	2018–2019	2	ABC Signature Studios; Wandering Rocks Productions	Freeform	
Helstrom (Note: Oversight of the series' production was transferred to Marvel Studios after closing)	2020	1	ABC Signature Studios; Lone Lemon Entertainment	Hulu	Initially meant to share continuity with the Marvel Cinematic Universe but was clarified as a stand-alone series by showrunner Paul Zbyszewski
M.O.D.O.K.	2021	1	10k; Multiverse Cowboy; Stoopid Buddy Stoodios	Hulu	Not part of the Marvel Cinematic Universe
Hit-Monkey	2021	2	Speck Gordon Inc.; Floyd County Productions	Hulu	Not part of the Marvel Cinematic Universe; production of the series moved to 20th Television Animation following its first season

=== Unaired pilots ===
Pilot	Year	Production partner	Network	Notes
Most Wanted	2016	ABC Studios	ABC	Intended to be part of the Marvel Cinematic Universe but not ordered to series
New Warriors	2017	ABC Signature Studios	—N/a	Intended to be part of the Marvel Cinematic Universe and originally developed for Freeform but never found a new network

== See also ==
- Marvel Productions
- List of Marvel Cinematic Universe television series (Marvel Television)
- X-Men in television
- List of television series based on Marvel Comics publications
- List of unproduced television projects based on Marvel Comics
