= Marvel Television (disambiguation) =

Marvel Television was a production company that was active from 2010 until 2019.

Marvel Television may also refer to:

- Marvel Television, a branding label used by Marvel Studios since 2024; see Marvel Studios § Marvel Television
- List of television series based on Marvel Comics publications

== See also ==
- List of Marvel Cinematic Universe television series (Marvel Television)
- List of Marvel Cinematic Universe television series (Marvel Studios)
- List of unproduced television projects based on Marvel Comics
