= Thor (Marvel Comics) in other media =

Marvel Comics version of Thor in other media

Adaptations of Thor in other media
- Created by: Stan Lee; Larry Lieber; Jack Kirby
- Original source: Comics published by Marvel Comics
- First appearance: Journey into Mystery No. 83 (August 1962)

Films and television
- Film(s): Thor (2011); Thor: Tales of Asgard (2011); Thor: The Dark World (2013); Thor: Ragnarok (2017); Thor: Love and Thunder (2022)
- Television show(s): The Marvel Super Heroes (1966); The Incredible Hulk Returns (1988); The Avengers: Earth's Mightiest Heroes (2010); Thor: Tales of Asgard (2011); Avengers Assemble (TV series) (2013); What If...? (TV series) (2021)

Games
- Video game(s): Thor: God of Thunder

Since the 1960s, The Marvel Comics superhero, Thor has appeared in a wide variety of media outside of comic books including films, television programs and video games.

== Television ==
=== 1960s ===
Thor as depicted in The Marvel Super Heroes.

Donald Blake (Steve Levitt) and Thor (Eric Allan Kramer) as depicted in The Incredible Hulk Returns.

Thor appears in a self-titled segment of The Marvel Super Heroes, voiced by Jack Creley.

=== 1980s ===
- Donald Blake appears in the Spider-Man (1981) episode "Wrath of the Sub-Mariner", voiced by Jack Angel.
- Thor appears in the Spider-Man and His Amazing Friends episode "Vengeance of Loki".
- Donald Blake and Thor appear in The Incredible Hulk Returns, portrayed by Steve Levitt and Eric Allan Kramer respectively. Blake is a former student of David Banner while Thor is a spirit who possesses him.
- Thor was intended to appear in an animated series by Ruby-Spears, with concept art designed by Jack Kirby.

=== 1990s ===
- Thor appears in Fantastic Four, voiced by John Rhys-Davies.
- Donald Blake / Thor appears in The Incredible Hulk episode "Mortal Bounds", voiced by Mark L. Taylor and again by John Rhys-Davies, respectively.
- Thor makes a non-speaking cameo appearance in the X-Men: The Animated Series episode "The Dark Phoenix".
- Thor appears in the introduction sequence for The Avengers: United They Stand.

=== 2000s ===
Thor as depicted in The Super Hero Squad Show.

- A Thor TV series was in development in 2000.
- Thor appears in The Super Hero Squad Show, voiced by Dave Boat. This version is a narcissistic yet loyal member of the titular team and temporary member of the Defenders who is in love with the Valkyrie.

=== 2010s ===
- Thor appears in The Avengers: Earth's Mightiest Heroes, voiced by Rick D. Wasserman. This version willingly came to Earth to use his powers to help mortals despite Odin's protests.
- Marvel Animation announced a 26-episode animated series in November 2008, to air in late 2010 before the release of Marvel Studios' Thor film but the series was never produced.
- Thor appears in Ultimate Spider-Man, voiced by Travis Willingham. Additionally, The Super Hero Squad Show incarnation of the character makes a cameo appearance in the episode "Flight of the Iron Spider", voiced again by Dave Boat.
- Thor appears in Avengers Assemble, voiced again by Travis Willingham.
- Thor appears in Phineas and Ferb: Mission Marvel, voiced again by Travis Willingham.
- Thor appears in Lego Marvel Super Heroes: Maximum Overload, voiced again by Travis Willingham.
- Thor appears in Hulk and the Agents of S.M.A.S.H., voiced again by Travis Willingham.
- Thor appears in Marvel Disk Wars: The Avengers, voiced by Yasuyuki Kase in the original Japanese version and again by Travis Willingham in the English dub.
- Thor appears in Lego Marvel Super Heroes: Avengers Reassembled, voiced again by Travis Willingham.
- Thor appears in Guardians of the Galaxy, voiced again by Travis Willingham.
- Thor appears in Lego Marvel Super Heroes – Guardians of the Galaxy: The Thanos Threat, voiced again by Travis Willingham.
- Thor appears in Marvel Super Hero Adventures, voiced by David Attar.

=== 2020s ===
- Thor appears in Marvel Future Avengers, voiced again by Yasuyuki Kase in the Japanese version and by Patrick Seitz in the English dub.
- Thor appears in Marvel Battleworld: Mystery of the Thanostones, voiced by Ian Hanlin.
- Thor appears in the Spider-Man (2017) episode "Maximum Venom", voiced again by Travis Willingham.
- Thor appears in Lego Marvel Avengers: Strange Tails, voiced again by Travis Willingham.

== Film ==
- In 1990, after finishing with the filming of Darkman, Sam Raimi and Stan Lee pitched a concept for a Thor feature film to 20th Century Fox. However, the project was abandoned.
- The Ultimate Marvel incarnation of Thor appears in Ultimate Avengers (2006) and Ultimate Avengers 2 (2006), voiced by Dave Boat.
- Thor appears in Next Avengers: Heroes of Tomorrow, voiced by Michael Adamthwaite.
- Thor appears in Hulk vs. Thor, voiced by Matthew Wolf.
- Thor makes a non-speaking appearance in a flashback in Planet Hulk (2010).
- Thor appears in Thor: Tales of Asgard, voiced again by Matthew Wolf.
- Thor appears in Avengers Confidential: Black Widow & Punisher.
- Thor appears in Marvel Super Hero Adventures: Frost Fight!, voiced again by Travis Willingham.
- Thor appears in Lego Marvel Super Heroes – Black Panther: Trouble in Wakanda, voiced again by Travis Willingham.
- Thor appears in Lego Marvel Avengers: Climate Conundrum, voiced by Ian Hanlin.
- Thor appears in Lego Marvel Avengers: Loki in Training, voiced again by Ian Hanlin.
- Thor appears in Lego Marvel Avengers: Time Twisted, voiced again by Ian Hanlin.
- Thor appears in Lego Marvel Avengers: Code Red, voiced again by Travis Willingham.
- Thor appears in Lego Marvel Avengers: Mission Demolition, voiced again by Travis Willingham.

== Marvel Cinematic Universe ==
Thor appears in media set in the Marvel Cinematic Universe (MCU), portrayed by Chris Hemsworth as an adult and Dakota Goyo as a child. First appearing in a self-titled film (2011), he makes subsequent appearances in The Avengers (2012), Thor: The Dark World (2013), Avengers: Age of Ultron (2015), Doctor Strange (2016), Thor: Ragnarok (2017), Avengers: Infinity War (2018), Avengers: Endgame (2019), and Thor: Love and Thunder (2022). Additionally, Thor will appear in the upcoming Avengers: Doomsday.

Furthermore, Thor makes non-speaking cameo appearances in Agents of S.H.I.E.L.D. via archival footage while alternate timeline variants appear in What If...?, voiced by Hemsworth.

== Video games ==
- Thor appears as an assist character in Avengers in Galactic Storm.
- The Eric Masterson incarnation of Thor makes non-speaking cameo appearances in Marvel Super Heroes.
- Thor appears as an assist character in Marvel vs. Capcom: Clash of Super Heroes.
- Thor was originally slated to make a cameo appearance at the end of Spider-Man 2: Enter Electro. Due to the September 11 attacks however, his scene was scrapped. Nonetheless, Thor makes a cameo appearance in a Daily Bugle article.
- Thor appears as a playable character in Marvel: Ultimate Alliance, voiced by Cam Clarke.
- Thor appears as a playable character in Marvel: Ultimate Alliance 2, voiced by Jim Cummings.
- Thor appears as a playable character in Marvel Super Hero Squad, voiced by Dave Boat.
- Thor appears as a playable character in Marvel Super Hero Squad: The Infinity Gauntlet, voiced again by Dave Boat.
- Thor appears as a playable character in Marvel vs. Capcom 3: Fate of Two Worlds and Ultimate Marvel vs. Capcom 3, voiced again by Rick D. Wasserman.
- Thor, based on the MCU incarnation, appears in Thor: God of Thunder, voiced by Chris Hemsworth.
- Thor appears as a playable character in Marvel Super Hero Squad Online.
- Thor appears in LittleBigPlanet via the "Marvel Costume Kit 2" DLC.
- Thor appears as a playable character in Marvel Super Hero Squad: Comic Combat, voiced again by Dave Boat.
- Thor appears in Marvel Pinball, voiced again by Travis Willingham.
- Thor appears as a playable character in Marvel Avengers Alliance.
- Thor appears as a playable character in Marvel Avengers Alliance Tactics.
- Thor appears as a playable character in Marvel Avengers: Battle for Earth, voiced by James Arnold Taylor.
- Thor appears as a playable character in Marvel Heroes, voiced again by Rick D. Wasserman.
- Thor, based on the MCU incarnation, appears in the Thor: The Dark World tie-in game, voiced again by Travis Willingham.
- Thor appears as a playable character in Lego Marvel Super Heroes, voiced again by Travis Willingham.
- Thor appears as a playable character in Marvel Contest of Champions, voiced again by Travis Willingham.
- Thor appears as a playable character in Disney Infinity: Marvel Super Heroes, voiced again by Travis Willingham.
- Thor appears as a playable character in Disney Infinity 3.0, voiced again by Travis Willingham.
- Thor appears as a playable character in Marvel: Future Fight.
- Thor appears as a playable character in Marvel Avengers Academy, voiced by Colton Haynes. Additionally, a teenage Thor based on the Marvel Noir incarnation appears as well, voiced by Billy Kametz.
- Thor appears as a playable character in Marvel vs. Capcom: Infinite, voiced again by Travis Willingham.
- Three incarnations of Thor ("Marvel NOW", "Modern", and "Gladiator") appear as playable characters in Marvel Puzzle Quest.
- Thor appears as a playable character in Marvel Powers United VR, voiced again by Travis Willingham.
- Thor appears in Marvel Battle Lines, voiced again by Travis Willingham.
- Thor appears as a playable character in Marvel Ultimate Alliance 3: The Black Order, voiced again by Rick D. Wasserman.
- Thor appears in Marvel Dimension of Heroes, voiced again by Travis Willingham.
- Thor appears as a playable character in Marvel's Avengers, voiced again by Travis Willingham.
- Thor appears as an unlockable outfit in Fortnite Battle Royale, voiced again by Travis Willingham.
- Thor appears in Marvel Future Revolution, voiced again by Rick D. Wasserman.
- Thor appears as a playable character in Marvel Rivals, voiced again by Travis Willingham.

== Miscellaneous ==
- Thor appears in the Thor & Loki: Blood Brothers motion comic, voiced by Daniel Thorn.
- Thor appears in the Marvel Rising motion comic, voiced again by Travis Willingham.
- Thor appears in the Marvel Universe Live! stage show.
- In early 2019, Serial Box Publishing announced a weekly audio serial starring Thor. Mandy co-write Aaron Stewart-Ahn will lead the serial's writing team, which includes Jay Edidin, Brian Keene and Yoon Ha Lee.
- Thor also appeared in a 1966 Golden Records LP adapting Journey into Mystery #83 and #97, wherein he made his debut appearance.

== Literature ==
- Thor appears in the novel The Man Who Stole Tomorrow (1979), by David Michelinie.
- Thor appears in the novel The Avengers vs. The Thunderbolts (1998), by Pierce Askegren.
- Thor appears in The Ultimate Super-Villains, by Michael Jan Friedman and edited by Stan Lee, in 1996.
- The Ultimate Marvel incarnation of Thor appears in the novel The Tomorrow Men (2006), by Michael Jan Friedman.
- The Ultimate Marvel incarnation of Thor appears in the novel Against All Enemies (2007), by Alex Irvine.
- Thor appears in the novel trilogy Tales of Asgard, by Keith R.A. DeCandido.
