= Jack Colvin =

American actor (1934–2005)

- Born: October 13, 1934; Lyndon, Kansas, U.S.
- Died: December 1, 2005 (aged 71); North Hollywood, Los Angeles, California, U.S.
- Occupations: Actor; director
- Years active: 1966–2005
- Known for: The Incredible Hulk; Child's Play

Jack Colvin (October 13, 1934 – December 1, 2005) was an American character actor of theater, film and TV. He is best known for the role of the tabloid reporter Jack McGee in The Incredible Hulk television franchise (1977–1982).

== Early life ==
Colvin was born in Lyndon, Kansas, 27 mi (43.5 km) south of Topeka, Kansas.

He began his stage career as a child performer. At age seventeen, Colvin became a private student of Michael Chekhov.

== Career ==
Although he appeared in hundreds of films and television shows, he always returned to the theater. His stage roles include Marchbanks in Shaw's Candida, Mercutio in Romeo and Juliet, Morgan Evans in The Corn Is Green, Algernon in The Importance of Being Earnest, Constantin in The Seagull, and Edmund in Long Day's Journey into Night.

His film credits include Jeremiah Johnson (1972), Scorpio (1973), The Stone Killer (1973), The Terminal Man (1974), Rooster Cogburn (1975) and Child's Play (1988) among others.

His partnership with Yvonne Wilder in one of the more successful comedy acts of the 1960s, Colvin and Wilder, led him to appear all over the U.S. on stage and on television, including The Dean Martin Show, The Ed Sullivan Show and The Tonight Show Starring Johnny Carson, culminating in their farewell appearance at Carnegie Hall in New York City.

Besides his starring role in The Incredible Hulk, Colvin also appeared on television in Quincy, M.E., Switch, The Rockford Files, The Six Million Dollar Man, Kojak, and The Bionic Woman. While under contract to Universal Pictures for seven years, he appeared in over 100 hours of television programming.

He taught at the central Experimental Film School of Rome, the University of Southern California, Cal State Northridge, the American Academy of Dramatic Arts, the 1994 Michael Chekhov International Workshop in Sussex, the Centre for Performance Research at the University of Birmingham in 1999, and The Michael Chekhov Association's New York University June Intensive in 2004.

Colvin served as the artistic director of the Michael Chekhov Studio USA West, a position he founded, until his death in early December 2005.

== Honors and awards ==
Colvin won Los Angeles' Drama-Logue Awards in five separate categories, as actor, director, playwright, producer, and production designer.

== Personal life and death ==
Colvin died in December 2005 from complications of a stroke. His body was cremated.

== Filmography ==
- The Rat Patrol (1966–1968; TV Series) – Lieutenant Gustav Luden
- How Sweet It Is! (1968) – Assistant Chief
- Viva Max! (1969) – Garcia
- Monte Walsh (1970) – Card Cheat
- Jeremiah Johnson (1972) – Lieutenant Mulvey
- Hickey & Boggs (1972) – Shaw
- The Life and Times of Judge Roy Bean (1972) – Pimp
- Scorpio (1973) – Thief
- The Stone Killer (1973) – Lionel Jumper
- The Terminal Man (1974) – Detective
- The Crazy World of Julius Vrooder (1974) – Sergeant
- Rooster Cogburn (1975) – Red
- The Bionic Woman (1976, TV Series)
- Embryo (1976) – Dr. Jim Winston
- Exo-Man (1977) – Martin
- Six Million Dollar Man (1977, TV Series) - 4 episodes: Look Alike – Ed Jasper; Hocus-Pocus – Will Collins; Dark Side of the Moon, Part 1 and Part 2 – Dr. Charles Leith
- Quincy, M.E. (1977, 1982; Television Series) – Ross; Bill Legget
- The Incredible Hulk (1977–1981; TV series) – Jack McGee; 82 episodes
- The Law & Harry McGraw (1988) - Jesse Barlow/Peter Bergmann - Harry Does the Hustle
- The Incredible Hulk Returns (1988; TV movie) – Jack McGee
- Child's Play (1988) – Dr. Ardmore
