= Nicholas J. Corea =

American author

Nick Corea
- Born: Nicholas Joseph Corea; April 7, 1943; St. Louis, Missouri, US
- Died: January 17, 1999 (aged 55); Burbank, California, US
- Occupations: Television producer, director and writer
- Known for: The Incredible Hulk, The Incredible Hulk Returns, Outlaws, Renegade, Walker, Texas Ranger
- Spouse: Pheny (m. 1992)

Nicholas "Nick" Joseph Corea (April 7, 1943 – January 17, 1999) was an American author, television writer, director, producer and painter. Though best known for his work on The Incredible Hulk and its sequel 1988 telefilm The Incredible Hulk Returns, he was involved with many television series during the late 1970s and 1980s including The Oregon Trail, Airwolf, Street Hawk, Hard Time on Planet Earth and Booker. He was also the creator of the 1986 western series Outlaws.

Prior to his death in 1999, Corea wrote episodes for Renegade, M.A.N.T.I.S., Kung Fu: The Legend Continues and Star Trek-series Star Trek: Deep Space Nine and Star Trek: Voyager. He was also a one-time writer and creative consultant for Walker, Texas Ranger.

== Biography ==
Corea was born and raised in St. Louis, Missouri. He enlisted in the United States Marines during the Vietnam War, was awarded the Purple Heart and reached the rank of Sergeant before being honorably discharged. His squad called him “Padre” since he was the oldest at 21. Shortly thereafter, he returned to his hometown to join the University City, Missouri Police Department. While in the military, he was an active contributor to Stars and Stripes and later wrote the police novel A Cleaner Breed in 1974.

Following the success of his first book, Corea entered the television industry as a writer and producer. His first scripts were for police dramas Police Woman (1974), Baa Baa Black Sheep (1976) and Kingston: Confidential (1977). His first regular writing job was for western series The Oregon Trail. However, he found his first major success at Universal Studios as writer, director and producer of The Incredible Hulk from 1978 to 1981.

He wrote and directed the 1981 television movie The Archer: Fugitive from the Empire. The movie was intended to be a pilot for a regular television series and, although broadcast on NBC, it was better received outside the United States where it "received some theatrical exposure" under the title The Archer and the Sorceress.

He was also the supervising producer for Gavilian and a writer for The Renegades (1983), Airwolf (1984) and Street Hawk (1985). He was also the writer and executive producer for J.O.E. and the Colonel, another television movie, in 1985. A year later, he wrote, produced and directed a short-lived western-themed science fiction series, Outlaws, in 1986. The pilot proved popular with viewers, being one of the most watched shows the week it aired, however ratings quickly dwindled as poor promotion and its placement in the Saturday night "graveyard" slot led to its eventual cancellation by CBS at the end of its first season. Two of its stars, Rod Taylor and Charles Napier, had been cast members of The Oregon Trail and the final episode featured clips from that show as part of a "flashback" episode of how the characters first met.

In 1988, Corea wrote, directed and produced the television movie The Incredible Hulk Returns as a follow-up to the original Incredible Hulk series. He then wrote episodes for Hard Time on Planet Earth and Booker during 1989 and, in 1992, he wrote the television movie Mario and the Mob.

From 1992 to 1993, Corea was a writer and executive producer for Renegade and later wrote episodes for M.A.N.T.I.S. in 1994, and Kung Fu: The Legend Continues and High Sierra Search and Rescue during 1995. He also wrote two episodes of Star Trek: Deep Space Nine and one of Star Trek: Voyager. One of his last television projects was as a one-time writer and creative consultant for Walker, Texas Ranger. He died of pancreatic cancer in Burbank, California on January 17, 1999.

Shortly before his death, Corea wrote an episode for Walker, Texas Ranger entitled "Brothers in Arms", which was to feature longtime friend and actor Grand L. Bush as a guest star. Bush portrayed Simon Trivette, an estranged brother of James Trivette (Clarence Gilyard), and is considered one of the most memorable episodes in the series. Bush and his wife, journalist Sharon Crews, later watched the episode privately with Corea's widow when it was finally broadcast.

Nick Corea was also an avid painter, whose works include Blue Baby, Love Masks, etc.

== Bibliography ==
- A Cleaner Breed (1974)
