= The Incredible Hulk (1978 TV series) =

American television series (1977–1982)

- Genre: Action; Adventure; Superhero; Science fiction; Drama
- Based on: The Hulk by: Stan Lee; Jack Kirby
- Developed by: Kenneth Johnson
- Starring: Bill Bixby; Jack Colvin; Lou Ferrigno
- Narrated by: Ted Cassidy (opening narration)
- Ending theme: "The Lonely Man Theme"
- Composer: Joe Harnell
- Country of origin: United States
- Original language: English
- No. of seasons: 5
- No. of episodes: 80 + 5 TV movies (list of episodes)

Production
- Executive producer: Kenneth Johnson
- Producers: James D. Parriott; Kenneth Johnson; Nicholas Corea
- Running time: 47–50 minutes
- Production companies: Universal Television; Marvel Comics Group

Original release
- Network: CBS
- Release: November 4, 1977 – May 12, 1982

Related
- The Incredible Hulk Returns (1988)

The Incredible Hulk is an American television series based on the Marvel Comics character the Hulk. The series aired on the CBS television network and starred Bill Bixby as Dr. David Banner, Lou Ferrigno as the Hulk, and Jack Colvin as Jack McGee.

In the series, Dr. David Banner, a widowed physician and scientist who is presumed dead, travels across the United States under assumed names and finds himself in positions where he helps others in need despite his terrible secret: Following an accidental overdose of gamma radiation that altered his cells, in times of extreme anger or stress, he transforms into a huge, savage, incredibly strong green-skinned humanoid, who has been named the Hulk. In his travels, Banner earns money by working temporary jobs while searching for a way to either control or cure his condition. All the while, he is obsessively pursued by a tabloid newspaper reporter, Jack McGee, who is convinced that the Hulk is a deadly menace whose exposure would help his career.

The series' two-hour television pilot movie, which established the Hulk's origins, aired on November 4, 1977. The series' 80 episodes were originally broadcast by CBS over five seasons from 1978 to 1982. It was developed and produced by Kenneth Johnson, who also wrote and directed some episodes.

In 1988, the filming rights were purchased from MCA/Universal by New World Television for a series of TV movies to conclude the series' storyline. The broadcast rights were, in turn, transferred to rival NBC. New World (which at one point owned Marvel) produced three television films: The Incredible Hulk Returns (directed by Nicholas J. Corea), The Trial of the Incredible Hulk, and The Death of the Incredible Hulk (both directed by Bill Bixby). The Incredible Hulk has garnered a worldwide fan base.

== Premise ==
David Banner, M.D., is a physician and scientist employed at California's Culver Institute, who is traumatized by the car accident that killed his beloved wife, Laura. Banner and his research partner, Dr. Elaina Marks, study people who summoned superhuman strength during moments of extreme stress. Obsessed with discovering why he was unable to exhibit such super strength under similar conditions, Banner hypothesizes that high levels of gamma radiation from sunspots contributed to the subjects' increase in strength.

Impatient to test his theory, Banner conducts an unsupervised experiment in the laboratory, bombarding himself with gamma radiation. However, the radiology equipment has recently been recalibrated, so Banner unknowingly gives himself a massive overdose. He initially thinks that the experiment has failed, but later, when he injures himself under a heavy rain while changing a flat tire, Banner's anger triggers his transformation into a 6-foot-5-inch-tall (1.96 m), 286-pound (130 kg) green skinned, superhumanly strong creature who is driven by rage, and has only a primitive intelligence. The creature reverts to Banner when he calms down, and, since Banner is unable to remember what occurs while in his transformed state, he goes to Marks for help. They succeed in deliberately triggering the transformation again, this time under laboratory conditions—and investigate the nature of the metamorphosis, and the possibility of a cure. Tabloid reporter Jack McGee, who was initially investigating Banner and Marks' superhuman strength research, now suspects them of being connected to the reports of a green-skinned monster roaming the area. While snooping around their laboratory, McGee unknowingly triggers a fire. Banner rushes back into the laboratory to save Marks, only for the creature to emerge from the fire with her in his arms, dying. Mistakenly believing that Banner was killed in the fire along with Marks and that the creature was responsible for their deaths, McGee publishes a story naming the "Incredible Hulk" as their killer and urges law enforcement to capture him.

Banner travels from place to place, assuming different identities and odd jobs to support himself and enable his search for a cure. He also finds himself feeling obliged to help the people he meets out of whatever troubles have befallen them. Inevitably, doing so puts him in perilous situations that trigger his transformations into the Hulk, which in turn attracts the attention of McGee, who is obsessively pursuing the mysterious creature across the country, both to prevent further violence and to bring legitimacy to his story.

Despite the rampages, the Hulk usually does good for the people Banner encounters in his travels. Each episode ends with Banner back on the road, fearful that the Hulk's appearances will bring unwanted scrutiny from the authorities and the ever-persistent McGee.

The opening narration summarizes the experiment that turned Banner into the Hulk, McGee's pursuit of the Hulk, and Banner's quest to control the Hulk while eluding authorities. A different version of the opening narration was used for the second pilot movie, The Return of the Incredible Hulk (later re-titled Death in the Family). This version is mostly the same but adds an explanation of why the Hulk is wanted for murder and why Banner is believed dead.

== Episodes ==
Season	Episodes	Originally released		
Season	Episodes	First released	Last released	Network
Pilot movies		November 4, 1977	November 28, 1977	CBS
1	10	March 10, 1978	May 26, 1978	CBS
2	22	September 22, 1978	May 25, 1979	CBS
3	23	September 21, 1979	April 11, 1980	CBS
4	18	November 7, 1980	May 22, 1981	CBS
5	7	October 2, 1981	May 12, 1982	CBS
Movies		May 22, 1988	February 18, 1990	NBC

== Cast ==
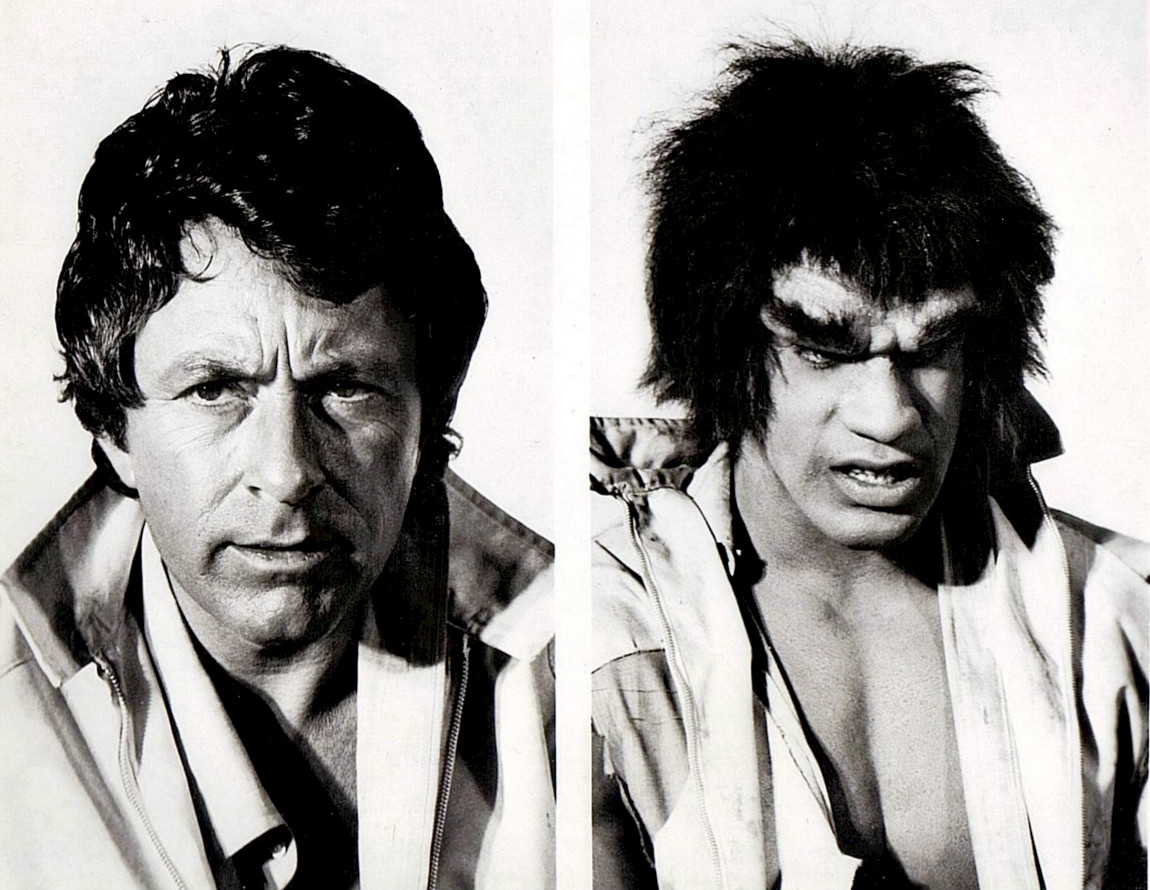
Incredible Hulk transformation (Bixby on left, Ferrigno on right)

=== Main cast ===
- Bill Bixby as Dr. David Bruce Banner
  - Lou Ferrigno as the Hulk, a gigantic, green humanoid creature that David turns into when angered or stressed.
    - Ted Cassidy as the voice of the Hulk / Opening Narration (seasons 1–2: uncredited)
    - Charles Napier as the voice of the Hulk (seasons 2–5: after Cassidy's death in 1979: uncredited)
- Jack Colvin as Jack McGee, a reporter tracking Hulk's trail.

=== Recurring cast ===
- Walter Brooke as Mark Roberts, McGee's boss at the National Register (seasons 3 & 4)

== Production ==
=== Development ===
In early 1977, Frank Price, head of Universal Television (known today as NBCUniversal Television), offered producer and writer Kenneth Johnson a deal to develop a television show based on any of several characters they had licensed from the Marvel Comics library. Johnson turned down the offer at first, but then, while reading the Victor Hugo novel Les Misérables, he became inspired and decided to add elements from Robert Louis Stevenson's novella Dr. Jekyll and Mr. Hyde and the idea of Greek tragic hubris; he then began working to develop the Hulk comic into a TV show.

Johnson made several changes from the comic book; this was partly to translate it into a live-action show that was more believable and acceptable to a wide audience, and also because he disliked comics and thus felt it best that the show be as different from the source material as possible. In the character's origin story, rather than being exposed to gamma rays during a botched atomic testing explosion, Banner is gamma-irradiated in a more low-key laboratory mishap during a test on himself. Another change was Banner's occupation, from physicist to medical researcher/physician. Although the comic book Hulk's degree of speaking ability has varied over the years, the television Hulk did not speak at all—he merely growled and roared. Hulk co-creator Stan Lee later recounted: "When we started the television show, Ken said to me, 'You know, Stan, I don't think the Hulk should talk'. The minute he said it, I knew he was right. [In the comics], I had the Hulk talking like this: 'Hulk crush! Hulk get him!' I could get away with it in a comic, but that would have sounded so silly if he spoke that way in a television show."

The Hulk's strength is far more limited than in the comic book, which Johnson felt was necessary for the show to be taken seriously by viewers. The Hulk still retained a healing factor, however. For instance, in "The Harder They Fall", Banner is in a serious accident that severs his spinal cord, leaving him paraplegic, but after his next transformation into the Hulk he is able to walk within minutes while in that form, and Banner's spine is completely restored by the end of the episode. In the majority of episodes, the only science-fiction element was the Hulk himself. Johnson also omitted the comic book's supporting characters, instead using original character Jack McGee.

Johnson changed the name of the Hulk's comic book alter ego, Dr. Bruce Banner, to Dr. David Banner for the television series. This change was made, according to Johnson, because he did not want the series to be perceived as a comic book series, so he wanted to change what he felt was a staple of comic books, and Stan Lee's comics in particular, that major characters frequently had alliterative names. According to both Stan Lee and Lou Ferrigno, it was also changed because CBS thought the name Bruce sounded "too gay-ish", a rationale that Ferrigno thought was "the most absurd, ridiculous thing [he had] ever heard". On the DVD commentary of the pilot, Johnson says that it was a way to honor his son David. "Bruce" ultimately became the television Banner's middle name, as it had been in the comics. It is visible on Banner's tombstone at the end of the pilot movie, and that footage is shown at the beginning of every episode of the series.

Johnson also wanted the Hulk to be colored red rather than green. His reasons were that red, not green, is perceived as the color of rage, and also that red is a "human color", whereas green is not. However, Stan Lee, an executive at Marvel Comics at the time, said that the Hulk's color was not something that could be changed, because of its iconic image.

Stan Lee told Kenneth Plume in a June 26, 2000, interview: "The Hulk was done intelligently. It was done by Ken Johnson, who's a brilliant writer/producer/director, and he made it an intelligent, adult show that kids could enjoy. He took a comic book character and made him somewhat plausible. Women liked it and men liked it and teenagers liked it... It was beautifully done. He changed it quite a bit from the comic book, but every change he made, made sense."

=== Casting ===
For the role of Dr. David Banner, Kenneth Johnson cast Bill Bixby - his first choice for the role. Jack Colvin was cast as Jack McGee, the cynical tabloid newspaper reporter—modeled after the character of Javert in Les Misérables—who pursues the Hulk. Arnold Schwarzenegger auditioned for the role of the Hulk, but was rejected due to his inadequate height, according to Johnson in his commentary on The Incredible Hulk – Original Television Premiere DVD release. Actor Richard Kiel was hired for the role. During filming, however, Kenneth Johnson's son pointed out that Kiel's underdeveloped physique did not resemble the Hulk's. Soon, Kiel was replaced with professional bodybuilder Lou Ferrigno, although a very brief shot of Kiel (as the Hulk) remains in the pilot. According to an interview with Kiel, who saw properly out of only one eye, he reacted badly to the contact lenses used for the role, and also found the green makeup difficult to remove, so he did not mind losing the part.

The Incredible Hulk was unusual in that the two principal actors, Bixby and Ferrigno, almost never interacted, since they were playing two forms of the same character. According to Bixby, he and Ferrigno also made a point of not discussing their parts with each other or watching each other as they were filmed, since this made it more natural for them to act as though unaware of where they are or what their alter ego has done following a transformation.

The opening narration was provided by actor Ted Cassidy, who also provided the Hulk's voice overs (mainly growls and roars) during the first two seasons. Cassidy died during the production of season two in January 1979. The Hulk's vocalizations for the remainder of the series were provided by actor Charles Napier, who also made two guest-starring appearances in the series.

==== Guest stars and cameos ====
Guest actors on the series included future Falcon Crest and Castle co-star Susan Sullivan in the original pilot; Brett Cullen, also of Falcon Crest; Kim Cattrall, of Sex and the City fame; Ray Walston, co-star of Bixby's first series, My Favorite Martian; Brandon Cruz, co-star of The Courtship of Eddie's Father; Lou Ferrigno, who along with starring as the Hulk, appeared in one episode ("King of the Beach") as a different character; Bixby's ex-wife Brenda Benet; and in an uncredited role, the bodybuilder and professional wrestler Ric Drasin as the half-transformed Hulk (Demi Hulk), in "Prometheus" (parts 1 and 2).

Mariette Hartley won the Primetime Emmy Award for Outstanding Lead Actress in a Drama Series for her guest appearances as Dr. Carolyn Fields in the episode "Married" (aka "Bride of the Incredible Hulk") in season two.

Stan Lee and Jack Kirby, the writer and artist team who created the Hulk for Marvel Comics, both made cameo appearances in the series. Kirby's cameo was in the season two episode "No Escape", while Lee appeared as a juror in Trial of the Incredible Hulk (the 1989 post-series TV movie).

=== Make-up ===
The effect of Banner transforming into the Hulk was created by editing together five stages: 1) Bill Bixby as normal, 2) Bixby wearing green contact lenses, 3) Bixby wearing green makeup and a forehead prosthetic, in addition to the contact lenses, 4) Bixby with green hair dye and a darker shade of green makeup, and 5) Lou Ferrigno in full makeup.

Initially, the Hulk's facial make-up was quite monstrous, but after both pilots, the first two weekly episodes and New York location shooting for the fourth, the design was toned down. The makeup process used to transform Ferrigno into the Hulk took three hours, and Bixby's stage 4 makeup alone took two hours to apply. The hard contact lenses Ferrigno wore to simulate the Hulk's electric-green eyes had to be removed every 15 minutes because he found wearing them physically painful. The green fright wig he wore as the Hulk was made of dyed yak hair.

=== Filming ===
According to Bixby, filming for the show was intensive and exhausting for both the cast and crew. He commented during production of the series's fourth season, "We've already lost a third of our crew, because of sickness or sheer exhaustion. ... Working on an hour action show demands all your time. We are constantly on the road with all our location shooting. We're like gypsies; we have no place to settle down. We don't even have a sound stage of our own!"

Lou Ferrigno performed many of his own stunts for the series, but was doubled by Manny Perry as there were few stunt doubles who could match Ferrigno's physique.

=== Music ===
Joe Harnell, one of Kenneth Johnson's favorite composers, composed the music for The Incredible Hulk. He was brought into the production because of his involvement with the series The Bionic Woman, which Johnson had also created and produced. Some of the series' music was collected into an album titled The Incredible Hulk: Original Soundtrack Recording. The show's main theme, "The Lonely Man", is heard in two distinct arrangements. The opening credits features the piece in an up-tempo, percussive arrangement whilst a sad, melancholic solo-piano version is played over the closing credits, which usually shows Banner hitchhiking.

The show's secondary theme, "The Love Theme from The Incredible Hulk", was used extensively in both the pilot episode and in the Season 2 opener Married, and it made sporadic appearances throughout the show's run.

== Themes ==
Often, Banner's inner struggle is paralleled by the dilemmas of the people he encounters, who find in Dr. Banner a sympathetic helper. Producer Kenneth Johnson stated: "What we were constantly doing was looking for thematic ways to touch the various ways that the Hulk sort of manifested itself in everyone. In Dr. David Banner, it happened to be anger. In someone else, it might be obsession, or it might be fear, or it might be jealousy or alcoholism! The Hulk comes in many shapes and sizes. That's what we tried to delve into in the individual episodes."

== Broadcast history ==
CBS

- March 1978 – January 1979: Friday, 9 p.m. (ET)
- January 1979: Wednesday, 8 p.m.
- February 1979 – November 1981: Friday, 8 p.m.
- May 1982 – June 1982: Wednesday, 8 p.m.

=== Syndication ===
The series first went into syndication in September 1982. It has aired as reruns on the Sci-Fi Channel and was one of the series that the channel showed at its inception in September 1992. It has also aired on Retro Television Network, and ran on Esquire Network from 2014 to 2015. Series reruns began airing on most MeTV affiliates in February 2016. The series began airing on most H&I affiliates in May 2017. El Rey Network started airing the series in portrait-form in January 2017.

=== Television films ===
Two episodes of the series appeared first as stand-alone television films, but these were later re-edited into one-hour length (two-parters) for Broadcast syndication. They were produced as pilots before the series officially began in 1978;

- The Incredible Hulk (1977) (distributed in theaters in some countries)
- The Return of the Incredible Hulk (1977), also shown overseas as a feature film; retitled Death in the Family for syndication.

After the cancellation of the television series in 1982, Bill Bixby retained an interest in producing new adventures featuring the Hulk for television. In 1984, just two years after the cancellation of the weekly series, he made a proposal to Nicholas Hammond, who had played Peter Parker in the 1977–79 TV series The Amazing Spider-Man, to develop a new TV movie featuring both the Hulk and Spider-Man. Although nothing came of this idea, three television movies were eventually produced with Bixby and Ferrigno reprising their roles. All of these aired on NBC:

- The Incredible Hulk Returns (1988) – This marked the first time that another Marvel Universe character appeared in the milieu of the TV series. David Banner meets a former student (played by Steve Levitt) who has a magical hammer that summons Thor (played by Eric Allan Kramer), a Norse god who is prevented from entering Valhalla. It was set up as a backdoor pilot for a live-action television series starring Thor. This project marked Jack Colvin's final appearance as McGee.
- The Trial of the Incredible Hulk (1989) – David Banner meets a blind lawyer named Matt Murdock and his masked alter ego, Daredevil. The Incredible Hulk and the Daredevil battle Wilson Fisk (the Kingpin of Crime). Daredevil was portrayed by Rex Smith, and John Rhys-Davies portrayed Fisk. This was also set up as a backdoor pilot for a live-action television series featuring Daredevil. Stan Lee has a cameo appearance as one of the jury members overlooking Banner's trial.
- The Death of the Incredible Hulk (1990) – David Banner falls in love with an Eastern European spy (played by Elizabeth Gracen) and saves two kidnapped scientists. The film ends with the Hulk taking a fatal fall from an airplane, reverting to human form just before he dies.

Despite the apparent death of the Hulk in the 1990 film, another Hulk television movie was planned, Revenge of the Incredible Hulk. It was rumored that in this film the Hulk would be able to talk after being revived with Banner's mind, and that it was abandoned because of Bill Bixby's death from cancer in November 1993. However, Gerald Di Pego (writer/executive producer of The Trial of the Incredible Hulk, The Death of the Incredible Hulk, and Revenge of the Incredible Hulk) revealed that the film was canceled before Bixby's health began to decline, owing to disappointing ratings for Death of, and that Banner was to have been revived without the ability to change into the Hulk at all, reverting to (still non-speaking) Hulk form only in the film's final act.

== Home media and streaming ==
Universal released all 5 seasons on DVD in Region 1 from 2006 to 2008; a complete series DVD set was also released. The Complete Series also became available for Streaming on Tubi in May 2026.

Fabulous Films released The Incredible Hulk - The Complete Series on DVD in the UK on September 30, 2008. They subsequently released the complete series (excluding the three post-series TV movies) on Blu-ray in December 2016.

== Reception ==
=== Critical response ===
On review aggregator Rotten Tomatoes, the two-hour pilot has a score of 57% based on seven reviews, for an average rating of 5.4/10, while the first season has a rating of 75% based on eight reviews, for an average rating of 6.0/10. Writing for the Tallahassee Democrat, Steve Watkins noted that Lou Ferrigno "did the strong, silent type like nobody's business", and was "natural" in the titular role.

A retrospective on the TV series reported that the episodes that fans of the show most often cited as the best of the series are "The Incredible Hulk" (pilot), "Married", "Mystery Man", "Homecoming", "The Snare", "Prometheus", "The First" and "Bring Me the Head of the Hulk".

=== Ratings ===
- 1977–1978: #26 (tied with Hawaii Five-O)
- 1978–1979: #44 (tied with Hawaii Five-O and Dear Detective)
- 1979–1980: #42
- 1980–1981: #49
- 1981–1982: #34

The Incredible Hulk was a solid ratings performer, usually winning its Friday night time slot, and even became a hit in Europe, despite superheroes generally being much less popular there than in the United States.

== Other media ==
The series led to a syndicated newspaper strip that ran from 1978 to 1982. It used the same background and origin story as the series but narrated stories outside of it.

Power Records (Peter Pan records) created an LP in 1978 entitled The Incredible Hulk: Hear Four Exciting All New Action Adventure Stories! – Black Chasm, Monster From The Deep, The Assassin & Blind Alley. In the stories he is referred to as "David Banner" and is also a name-changing drifter seeking a cure.

In 1979, Ideal Toy Company released a board game called The Incredible Hulk – Smash–Up Action Game. Players must to try to create a lab in order to find a cure for "Dr. David Banner".

In 1979, a Hulk "video novel" in paperback form was released, with pictures and dialog from the pilot.

The Marvel Cinematic Universe has homaged the show twice. The first time, during the opening credits of the film The Incredible Hulk (2008), Bruce Banner's (Edward Norton) experiment which serves as his origin story as the Hulk is shown as the same as in the television series. The show's opening sequence is homaged in the Disney+ series She-Hulk: Attorney at Law (2022) during the episode "Whose Show Is This?". It is recreated to focus on Jennifer Walters / She-Hulk (Tatiana Maslany), with Banner (Mark Ruffalo) also appearing, dressed as David. Stan Lee created She-Hulk to ensure CBS did not create a female Hulk first and acquire the rights to the concept.

Lou Ferrigno appears as an unlockable character in LEGO Marvel's Avengers, with his special ability being to spray-paint himself green and transform into the Hulk.

== See also ==
- 1978 in American television
