= The Death of the Incredible Hulk =

1990 television film

- DVD cover
- Genre: Action; Adventure; Superhero; Drama
- Created by: Kenneth Johnson
- Written by: Gerald Di Pego
- Directed by: Bill Bixby
- Starring: Bill Bixby; Lou Ferrigno; Elizabeth Gracen; Andreas Katsulas; Philip Sterling
- Theme music composer: Lance Rubin; "The Lonely Man Theme" by Joe Harnell
- Country of origin: United States
- Original language: English

Production
- Executive producer: Bill Bixby
- Producers: Robert Ewing; Hugh Spencer-Phillips
- Production location: Vancouver
- Cinematography: Chuck Colwell
- Editor: Janet Ashikaga
- Running time: 95 minutes
- Production companies: Bixby-Brandon Productions; New World Television; Marvel Comics

Original release
- Network: NBC
- Release: February 18, 1990

Related
- The Trial of the Incredible Hulk

The Death of the Incredible Hulk is a 1990 American television superhero film, the last of three films based on the 1978–1982 television series The Incredible Hulk. Bill Bixby reprises his role as Dr. David Banner and Lou Ferrigno returns to play the Hulk. It was filmed in Vancouver, British Columbia, Canada. A script was written for a sequel television film, The Revenge of the Incredible Hulk, which would resurrect the character, but it was canceled due to receiving mixed-to-negative reviews.

== Plot ==
David Banner masquerades as David Bellamy, a janitor, to gain access to Genecore Laboratory. He believes that the studies of one of the scientists there, Dr. Ronald Pratt, may hold the key to curing his gamma-induced condition that, in times of stress, turns him into a superhuman creature known as the Hulk. At nights David breaks into Pratt's high-security laboratory and examines his work, making corrections and additions. Ronald notices his alterations and hides in the lab in wait for his secret helper. He catches David, who, under threat of the authorities being summoned, reveals his true identity and his transformations into the Hulk. His condition dives into Ronald's own research on using genetic engineering to enhance humans' healing ability, for the Hulk's accelerated metabolism closes any wound in seconds.

With the help of his scientist wife Amy, Ronald constructs a force field cage and sensors which enable them to study the creature. The next few months, David, Amy, and Ronald bond while working on both Ronald's healing project and a cure for David. The facility's board pulls Ronald's funding because he refuses to turn his research towards engineering super soldiers, forcing him to move up David's treatment. An Eastern European spy named Jasmine is ordered by her superior, Kasha, to steal Ronald's files. Since Jasmine has attempted to leave the espionage business before and believes that Kasha is selling the information they acquire for his own financial benefit, Kasha holds her sister Bella hostage to ensure her compliance. Jasmine infiltrates the lab during David's treatment, expecting no one to be there since the procedure was unauthorized. Ronald tries to stop her from taking his files, and she shoves him into a table of chemicals, leaving him in a coma. She pulls him out of the way of the resulting fire, but anger at her disruption and assault has already transformed David into the Hulk. The Hulk attacks Jasmine, who flees, and carries Ronald to safety before escaping the security officers alerted by the smoke alarm.

Since the information in the files Jasmine took is insufficient, Kasha orders her to abduct David in the hope that he can fill the gaps. However, after Jasmine finds David, her co-agents act on orders to eliminate her as unnecessary. During the resulting fight, one of the men is mortally wounded. He tells Jasmine that Bella is the leader of the spy network and faked her own hostage situation. David takes Jasmine to her cabin hideaway and treats her bullet wound. In return, Jasmine uses her espionage skills to get David to Ronald's hospital room without being identified so that he can speak to Ronald, coaxing him out of his coma.

The Hulk saves Jasmine from another attack by Kasha's men, causing her to see David with new eyes, and they become romantically involved. Plans to leave the country in order to elude their respective pursuers are aborted when they hear the Pratts have been kidnapped by Bella. Jasmine extracts their location, an airfield, from one of her former comrades and tips off the authorities. While sneaking into the airfield hangar, Jasmine is caught by the network's torturer, Zed, but she misdirects and overcomes him by pretending to swallow a suicide pill. The police raid the airfield, and David gets the Pratts to safety. Bella boards an airplane with Zed and shoots Kasha, who had been making overtures of taking her place. Disregarding her orders to escape, the vindictive Zed tries to run Jasmine down with the plane. David runs out to protect Jasmine and turns into the Hulk. The Hulk breaks into the plane. Bella opens fire on him, unintentionally shooting the fuel tank. The plane explodes, killing Bella, and Zed, while the Hulk plummets to the ground. David transforms back to human before dying of his injuries. Jasmine, Ronald, and Amy mourn for him.

== Cast ==
- Bill Bixby as Dr. David Banner / Hulk , a talented scientist and physician seeking to reverse a radiation treatment that causes him to transform into the Hulk when he becomes angry or stressed
- Lou Ferrigno as Hulk, a primal and superhumanly strong creature
- Elizabeth Gracen as Jasmine Romanoff, an accomplished Eastern European spy with a particular aptitude for disguises
- Philip Sterling as Dr. Ronald Pratt, a scientist seeking to enhance human healing through genetics
- Barbara Tarbuck as Amy Pratt, Ronald's wife, an artist and fellow scientist
- Anna Katarina as Bella / Ashenko, Jasmine's sister and the head of her spy network
- John Novak as Zed, the spy network's sadistic torturer
- Andreas Katsulas as Kasha, Jasmine's handler
- Chilton Crane as Betty, a security officer managing the entrance to Genecore Laboratory
- Carla Ferrigno as Bank Teller
- Duncan Fraser as Tom Simpson, a security officer managing another entrance to Genecore Laboratory
- Dwight McFee as Brendan Ashley, a member of the spy network who is a car salesman by day
- Lindsay Bourne as Mr. Crane, a Pentagon representative
- Mina E. Mina as Pauley, the spy who is ordered to kill Jasmine after she finds David
- Marlane O' Brien as Luanne Cole, a federal agent charged with protecting Ronald
- Garwin Sanford as Agent Shoup, Luanne's partner
- Justin DiPego as Dodger, a street thief who attacks David
- Fred Henderson as Aaron Colmer
- Judith Maxie as Dr. Carbino, director of Genecore Laboratory
- French Tickner as George Tilmer

== Production ==
This third post-series The Incredible Hulk telefilm was initially announced to feature the Marvel Comics character She-Hulk, just as the previous two had featured Thor and Daredevil. As of early July 1989, it was still firmly expected to do so, and to air that autumn, with Iron Man under consideration for a follow-up.

As with The Trial of the Incredible Hulk, the series regular character Jack McGee did not appear in The Death of the Incredible Hulk. According to the film's screenwriter Gerald Di Pego, he and actor/director Bill Bixby discussed Jack McGee, but Di Pego felt that McGee's inclusion would overload the film without adding much to the plot, and no one involved in the production made a serious push for him to be included.

The movie was filmed between November 1989 and January 1990 in Vancouver.

== Canceled sequel ==
Despite Hulk's death in the 1990 film, the film's makers had intended from the start for him to return in The Revenge of the Incredible Hulk, again with Gerald Di Pego as writer. As of July 10, 1990, a script was being written. The movie would have She-Hulk’s and Iron-Man’s cameos. It has been reported that the fourth film would have featured the Hulk with Banner's mind, and that the project was canceled because Bill Bixby struggled with cancer, but Di Pego has refuted both these claims as fan rumors, pointing out that Bixby's health had not yet begun to decline at the time the film was canceled. Di Pego said that the plot for The Revenge of the Incredible Hulk began with Banner being revived, but no longer able to change into the Hulk. Banner then begins to work for the government in order to prevent accidents like the one that turned him into the Hulk, but is captured by villains and coerced into turning their agents into Hulk-like beings. According to Di Pego, at the film's climax, Banner would be forced to recreate the accident that transformed him into the Hulk to stop the villains' plans.

The sequel was canceled because of the disappointing ratings for The Death of the Incredible Hulk.

== Home media ==
This telefilm was originally released on VHS by Rhino Home Video in 1992. It was released on DVD by 20th Century Fox Home Entertainment on June 3, 2003.

== See also ==
- The Incredible Hulk Returns (first telefilm)
- The Trial of the Incredible Hulk (second telefilm)
