= Gerald Di Pego =

American screenwriter and producer

- Born: July 22, 1941 (age 84); Chicago, Illinois, United States
- Occupations: Producer, screenwriter
- Years active: 1972–present
- Spouse: Christine DiPego

Gerald Di Pego (born July 22, 1941) is an American screenwriter and producer.

== Feature film screenplays ==
- W (also known as I Want Her Dead), Cinerama, 1974
- Sharky's Machine, Orion, 1981
- Phenomenon, Buena Vista, 1996
- Message in a Bottle, Warner Bros., 1999
- Instinct, Buena Vista, 1999
- Angel Eyes, Warner Bros., 2001
- The Forgotten, Sony Pictures, 2004
- Little Murder, Mind in Motion, 2011
- Words and Pictures, Roadside Attractions, 2013

== Television screenplays ==
- The Astronaut, ABC, 1972
- Short Walk to Daylight (also known as The Night the Earth Shook), ABC, 1972
- You'll Never See Me Again, ABC, 1973
- Runaway! (also known as The Runaway Train), ABC, 1973
- I Heard the Owl Call My Name, CBS, 1973
- The Stranger Who Looks Like Me, ABC, 1974
- Born Innocent, NBC, 1974
- The Four Feathers, NBC, 1978
- A Family Upside Down, NBC, 1978
- Freedom Fighter, NBC, 1988
- The Trial of the Incredible Hulk, NBC, 1989
- Murder in Paradise, NBC, 1990
- The Death of the Incredible Hulk, NBC, 1990
- A Mom for Christmas, NBC, 1990
- Keeper of the City (based on his novel of the same title), Showtime, 1991
- Miracle Child, NBC, 1993
- One More Mountain, ABC, 1994
- A Silent Betrayal, CBS, 1994
- The Forget-Me-Not Murders (also known as Janek: The Forget-Me-Not Murders), CBS, 1994
- The Little Riders, The Disney Channel, 1996
- Keeping the Promise, CBS, 1997
- A Nightmare Come True, CBS, 1997
- Tempting Fate, ABC, 1998
- Phenomenon II, ABC, 2002

== Television producer ==
- The Sheriff and the Astronaut (pilot), CBS, 1984
- Generation (pilot), ABC, 1985
- The Trial of the Incredible Hulk (movie), NBC, 1989
