= The Trial of the Incredible Hulk =

1989 television film directed by Bill Bixby

- Genre: Action; Adventure; Science fiction; Superhero; Drama
- Created by: Kenneth Johnson
- Written by: Gerald Di Pego
- Directed by: Bill Bixby
- Starring: Bill Bixby; Lou Ferrigno; John Rhys-Davies; Rex Smith; Marta DuBois; Nancy Everhard
- Theme music composer: Lance Rubin; "The Lonely Man Theme" by Joe Harnell
- Country of origin: United States
- Original language: English

Production
- Executive producers: Bill Bixby; Gerald Dipego
- Producers: Robert Ewing; Hugh Spencer-Phillips
- Production locations: British Columbia; Vancouver
- Cinematography: Chuck Colwell
- Editor: Janet Ashikaga
- Running time: 95 minutes
- Production companies: Bixby-Brandon Productions; New World Television; Marvel Comics

Original release
- Network: NBC
- Release: May 7, 1989

Related
- The Incredible Hulk Returns; The Death of the Incredible Hulk

The Trial of the Incredible Hulk is a 1989 American television superhero film based on the 1978–1982 television series The Incredible Hulk featuring both the Hulk and fellow Marvel Comics character Daredevil, who team up to defeat Wilson Fisk. As was the case with The Incredible Hulk Returns, this television film also acted as a backdoor television pilot for a series, in this case, for Daredevil (which was not produced). It was filmed in Vancouver, British Columbia, Canada. The Trial of the Incredible Hulk was directed by and stars Bill Bixby. Also starring are Lou Ferrigno, Rex Smith and John Rhys-Davies. Despite the film's title, writer/executive producer Gerald Di Pego has stated that the idea of having the Hulk actually go on trial was never even discussed.

== Plot ==
Still on the run, David Bruce Banner makes his way toward a large city with the hopes of staying incognito under the name David Belson. Unbeknownst to him, the city is under the control of a crime boss named Wilson Fisk and protected by a mysterious black-clad crimefighter known as Daredevil. While riding the commuter subway train, David witnesses two passengers sexually molesting a woman, Ellie Mendez, and intervenes. They strike him, making him transform into the Hulk, which results in disruption and chaos. David is arrested by the police and charged with attacking Ellie, who claims her actual attackers saved her from David.

Blind defense attorney Matt Murdock offers to take David's case pro bono publico, explaining that Ellie's attackers work for Fisk, whom he is trying to bring down. David is uncooperative, but Matt can tell he is telling the truth when he says he tried to help Ellie. Matt visits Ellie, who continues to claim David attacked her, but conspicuously falters under questioning, especially after Matt reveals he overheard her talking to her nurse about some men visiting her with his hyper-sensitive hearing. Considering Ellie a risk, Fisk has the nurse, one of his agents, give her a lethal injection, but Daredevil breaks into the hospital and stops the nurse.

Angered that Fisk's group tried to kill her when she was cooperating with them, Ellie calls Matt and offers to tell the truth about the attack in exchange for protection for her parents, who Fisk's men threatened. Before Matt can meet with her to get her statement, Fisk has Ellie abducted from protective custody. In jail, David has a nightmare about transforming into the Hulk on the witness stand during his upcoming trial. The stress causes him to transform in reality, and the Hulk breaks out of prison.

Daredevil finds the apartment where David is staying, wanting him to stand trial. David suspects Daredevil is one of Fisk's men, so he unmasks himself as Matt Murdock. Matt tells David that an accident with radiation blinded him when he was 14, while giving him enhanced senses and a "radar sense", and that he was inspired to become Daredevil by Officer Albert G. Tendelli, who now acts as his police contact. David nonetheless refuses to help or tell what he knows about the Hulk. Fisk plants info about Ellie's whereabouts as a trap for Daredevil. When Daredevil arrives, Fisk uses spotlights and blaring speakers to disorient him; instead, the speakers overwhelm Daredevil's enhanced hearing, allowing Fisk's men to beat him nearly to death. David arrives to save Matt, transforming into the Hulk in the process. Matt traces the Hulk's face as he transforms back to David, thus learning David's secret.

Using his training as a medical doctor, David treats Matt and spreads a cover story about his injuries being the result of falling down stairs. While Matt's self-confidence is shaken, David's confidence has been restored by seeing how Matt has embraced his unique gifts, which are also caused by exposure to radiation. At David's persistent coaxing, Matt begins to retrain his body.

Fisk holds a meeting of crime bosses and proposes the consolidation of their operations into a nationwide syndicate, with himself as chairman. He presents footage of Daredevil's apparent death as proof of his power. Daredevil and David infiltrate Fisk's office tower to discredit Fisk and save Ellie. David frees Ellie with assistance from Fisk's right-hand man, Edgar, who hints to them that he has on multiple occasions saved people from Fisk, who always forgives him. Daredevil breaks into the meeting, and the crime bosses flee.

David and Matt part as friends. David heads to a radiation laboratory in Portland in hopes of finding a cure for himself, and Matt remains in the city to protect it.

== Cast ==
- Bill Bixby as Dr. David Banner
- Lou Ferrigno as Hulk
- Rex Smith as Matt Murdock / Daredevil
- John Rhys-Davies as Wilson Fisk
- Marta DuBois as Ellie Mendez
- Nancy Everhard as Christa Klein
- Richard Cummings Jr. as Al Pettiman
- Nicholas Hormann as Edgar
- Joseph Mascolo as Dep. Chief Albert G. Tendelli
- Linda Darlow as Fake Nurse
- John Novak as Denny
- Dwight Koss as John
- Meredith Bain Woodward as Farm Supervisor
- Mark Acheson as Turk Barrett

== Production ==
Filming took place in Vancouver, Canada, for a month beginning on February 15, 1989.

The film acted as a backdoor pilot for a Daredevil series. Like his comic book incarnation, Daredevil is Matt Murdock, a lawyer who seeks to give criminals a second chance. In the comics, Daredevil normally wears a red costume. In the television film, he wears a black costume with no eye holes. His adversary is Wilson Fisk, who in this film is never called by the name "Kingpin".

Stan Lee, co-creator of the Hulk, makes a cameo appearance as the jury foreman in the dream sequence. He was replaced by a stunt double for the shot where the Hulk upends the jury box (which was actually lifted by hydraulic machinery), at director Bill Bixby's insistence. Lee recalled being disappointed at this, as he was excited to jump off the jury box and did not think it was significantly dangerous, since the jury box was just a couple of feet above the ground.

== Reception ==
Though it did not succeed in giving birth to a Daredevil television series, The Trial of the Incredible Hulk garnered very high ratings.

Viewers were less enthusiastic about it than The Incredible Hulk Returns. The most common criticisms were the absence of the Hulk himself from the final act and the misleading title (the "trial" only takes place in a dream sequence).

In a retrospective review for the Radio Times Guide to Films, film critic Narinder Flora awarded the film two stars out of five, calling it "tame action fare" with "all the hallmarks of an idea that has run out of steam".

== Home media ==
This television film was released on VHS by Starmaker Videos in December 1992. It was released by Anchor Bay Entertainment on May 6, 2003, along with The Incredible Hulk Returns as a DVD double feature. They were re-released by Image Entertainment on October 11, 2011.
