= Eric Allan Kramer =

American actor and fight choreographer (born 1962)

- Born: March 26, 1962 (age 64); Grand Rapids, Michigan, U.S.
- Other names: Eric Allen Kramer; Eric Kramer
- Education: University of Alberta (BFA)
- Occupation: Actor
- Years active: 1985–present
- Father: Roger Kramer

Eric Allan Kramer (born March 26, 1962) is an American actor. He is known to television audiences for his roles as Scott Miller on AMC's Lodge 49, Dave Rogers on The Hughleys, and Bob Duncan on the Disney Channel sitcom Good Luck Charlie. He was the first actor to play the Marvel Comics superhero Thor in live-action, in the made-for-television film The Incredible Hulk Returns (1988). He also appeared as Iron Mike Wilcox in the 2019 video game Days Gone.

== Early life ==
Kramer was born March 26, 1962, in Grand Rapids, Michigan. His father, Roger Kramer (1939–2023), was a professional football tackle and a two-time CFL All-Star.

His mother, Ilona Kramer (1940–2004), was born in Latvia and immigrated to the United States in 1949. He has a younger sister named Lisa (b. 1965).

Kramer attended the BFA program at the University of Alberta in Edmonton, which led to acting in the theater and some television and film roles, as well as a career in fight choreography.

== Career ==
In 1987, Kramer made his acting debut in television film The Gunfighters. He also starred in the 1990 film Quest for the Mighty Sword, replacing previous lead actor Miles O'Keeffe. He played Thor in NBC's television film The Incredible Hulk Returns and a Russian baseball player in the television movie The Comrades of Summer. Among Kramer's more notable roles have been Little John in Robin Hood: Men in Tights, Bear in American Wedding, and Boris, bodyguard to producer Lee Donowitz, in True Romance. He has also appeared in a number of notable television series, including Mad About You, Two and a Half Men, Wizards of Waverly Place, NCIS, Growing Pains, Cheers, Empty Nest, Blossom, CSI: Crime Scene Investigation, NewsRadio, JAG, Roseanne, Murder, She Wrote, Seinfeld, That '70s Show, Ellen, Monk, Jack and Bobby, Phil of the Future, How I Met Your Mother, The King of Queens, My Name Is Earl, and Will and Grace (appearing in the same episode as his Good Luck Charlie wife Leigh-Allyn Baker). Kramer was also a series regular on the sitcom Bob as Whitey van de Bunt (1993) and the ABC/UPN sitcom The Hughleys as Dave Rogers.

Kramer continues to work on the stage as a member of the Antaeus Theatre Company in Los Angeles and received an Ovatti Award nomination for his role in The Wood Demon. He also co-starred as Bob Duncan on the Disney Channel sitcom Good Luck Charlie. He also played Link's dad in the Nickelodeon series The Thundermans.

== Filmography ==
=== Film ===
Year	Title	Role	Notes
1990	Quest for the Mighty Sword	Ator	Direct-to-video
1993	Robin Hood: Men in Tights	Little John	
1993	True Romance	Boris	
1994	Road to Saddle River	Dieter	
1994	The Crazysitter	Elliot	
1996	High School High	Hulk	
2003	American Wedding	Bear	
2006	Grilled	Irving	
2009	Flying By	Steve	Direct-to-video
2014	Atlas Shrugged Part III: Who Is John Galt?	Ragnar Danneskjöld	
2014	Mostly Ghostly: Have You Met My Ghoulfriend?	John Doyle	
2015	LA Apocalypse	Sergeant Wade	
2016	8989 Redstone	Daryl Masters	
2016	Surge of Power: Revenge of the Sequel	Moon	
2017	Pitching Tents	Bruce	
2023	Alarmed	Larry Tench	

=== Television ===
Year	Title	Role	Notes
1987	The Gunfighters	Luke Collins	TV movie
1988	The Incredible Hulk Returns	Thor	TV movie
1988	Murder, She Wrote	Gunnar Tilstrom	Episode: "Snow White, Blood Red"
1989	Roseanne	Bobo	Episode: "Dan's Birthday Bash"
1989	Growing Pains	Tony	Episode: "Feet of Clay"
1989	Cheers	Rudy	Episode: "The Two Faces of Norm"
1990	Doctor Doctor	Dr. Destruction	Episode: "Family Affair" (credited as Eric Allen Kramer)
1990–1991	Down Home	Drew McCrorey	Recurring role; 8 episodes
1991–1994	Empty Nest	Apartment Manager / Sven / Sam	3 episodes
1992	Civil Wars	Ray Miller	Episode: "His Honor's Offer"
1992	Anything But Love	Actor	Episode: "Angst for the Memories"
1992	Wings	Biker	Episode: "Four Dates That Will Live in Infamy"
1992	Seinfeld	Biker	Episode: "The Keys"
1993	Bob	Whitey van de Bunt	3 episodes
1993	Johnny Bago	Tipper Donovan	Episode: "Johnny's Golden Shaft"
1994	M.A.N.T.I.S.	Jack "The Jackhammer" Mills	Episode: "Gloves Off"
1994	Blossom	Wildman Boyette	Episode: "The Game You Play Tomorrow"
1994	Renegade	Terry Houston	Episode: "Muscle Beach"
1995	Ellen	Detective Gil Ryan	Episode: "Guns 'N Ellen"
1995	Platypus Man	Doug Monroe	Episode: "Sweet Denial"
1995	A Whole New Ballgame	Tommy	Episode: "Twisted"
1995	Hope and Gloria	Issac	3 episodes
1995	The Home Court	Nick Kaofis	Episode: "The Cheesehead Stands Alone"
1995	Dweebs	Helmut	Episode: "The Crush Show"
1996	Lois & Clark: The New Adventures of Superman	Drull	2 episodes
1996	Nash Bridges	Lyle	Episode: "Leo's Big Score"
1996	NewsRadio	Ted Chambers	Episode: "The Trainer"
1997	Mad About You	Skippy (Orderly #2)	Episode: "The Penis"
1997	JAG	Colonel Malcolm	Episode: "Force Recon"
1997	Men Behaving Badly	Husband	Episode: "It's Good to Be Dead"
1997	Rough Riders	Henry Bardshar	Miniseries, 2 episodes
1997	Hangin' with Mr. Cooper	Mr. Loudon	Episode: "One on One"
1997	Malcolm & Eddie	Mike McGinley	3 episodes
1997	Alright Already	Matt	Episodes: "Again with Mah Johngg"
1998	Pacific Blue	Lt. Derrick Williams	Episode: "House Party"
1998	Dharma and Greg	Officer Davis	Episode: "Dharma and Greg's First Romantic Valentine's Day Weekend"
1998	Caroline in the City	Olaf	Episode: "Caroline and the Cabby"
1998	Murphy Brown	Wally Tuttle	Episode: "Second Time Around"
1998	Arli$$	Chet	Episode: "Whatever It Takes"
1998–2002	The Hughleys	Dave Rogers	Main role
2001	Surviving Gilligan's Island	Alan Hale, Jr.	TV docudrama
2003	Two and a Half Men	Bill	Episode: "The Last Thing You Want Is to Wind Up with a Hump"
2003	The O.C.	Soccer Coach	Episode: "The Heights"
2004	That '70s Show	Stuart Sutcliffe	Episode: "Sally Simpson"
2004	Phil of the Future	Coach Buchinksy	Episode: "Future Jock"
2004	Oliver Beene	Krazy King	Episode: "The King and I"
2005	The King of Queens	Luke	Episode: "Pour Judgement"
2005	Jack & Bobby	Officer Burke	Episode: "And Justice for All"
2005	Will & Grace	Barry	Episode: "Sour Balls"
2005	Cuts	Brian	Episode: "Wife Swap"
2005, 2009	CSI: Crime Scene Investigation	Vic "The Eagle" Patterson / Deputy Sheriff	Episodes: "Hollywood Brass" and "The Descent of a Man"
2006	Rodney	Paul	Episode: "Sleepover"
2006	Monk	Darrell Cain	Episode: "Mr. Monk and the Astronaut"
2006	How I Met Your Mother	Bob Rorschach	Episode: "Milk"
2006	The Class	Man at Party	Episode: "Pilot"
2007	Big Shots	Eddie Jenowski	Episodes: "The Way We Weren't"
2008	Hollywood Residential	Pete	8 episodes
2008	Wizards of Waverly Place	Coach Gunderson	Episode: "Alex in the Middle"
2009	My Name is Earl	Jim	Episode: "Friends with Benefits"
2009	Maneater	Jones Merrifield	2 episodes
2010–2014	Good Luck Charlie	Bob Duncan	Main role, 97 episodes; also directed 2 episodes
2010	Huge	Cliff / Trent's dad	2 episodes
2010	Full Nelson	Erik the Viking	
2011
2011	NCIS	Phillip Ekkerly	Episode: "Thirst"
2011	Good Luck Charlie, It's Christmas!	Bob Duncan	Disney Channel Original Movie
2013	Jessie	Bob Duncan	Episode: "Good Luck Jessie"
2013–2014	NCIS: Los Angeles	Homeland Security Special Agent Tom Panetti	2 episodes
2015	The Thundermans	Mike Evilman	Episodes: "Meet the Evilmans", "Evil Never Sleeps"
2015	Bones	Eric Simms	Episode: "The Putter in the Rough"
2015–2016	Mike & Molly	Officer Seely	4 episodes
2016	The Librarians	Olafsson	Episode: "And the Reunion of Evil"
2016	Guidance	Principal John Decost	9 episodes
2016	Shooter	Paul Helling	Episode: "Danger Close"
2018	Mom	Earl	Episode: "Cottage Cheese and a Weird Buzz"
2018–2019	Lodge 49	Scott Miller	Main role
2019	On Becoming a God in Central Florida	Carroll Wilkes	2 episodes
2020	Sydney to the Max	Coach Carlock	Episode: "Father of the Bribe"
2020	9-1-1	Kendall's Dad	Episode: "Pinned"
2020	Fuller House	Kurt	Episode: "Something Borrowed"
2020	Good Luck Charlie: Reunion 2020	Himself	TV special
2020–2021	Side Hustle	Briles	3 episodes
2021	Big Shot	Jerry	Episode: "Everything to Me"
2021	Colin in Black & White	Basketball Coach	Episode: "Cornrows"
2022	The Neighborhood	Barry	Episode: "Welcome to the Quinceañera"
2022	The Conners	Bobo	Episode: "Two More Years and a Stolen Rose"
2022	Station 19	Randall	Episode: "The Road You Didn't Take"
2023	CSI: Vegas	Mr. Auerbach	Episode: "Ashes Ashes"
2024	Chicago Fire	Firefighter Carl	Episode: "Under Pressure"
2024	Bookie	Officer Wilkes	Episode: "Mahnanga"
2024	The Really Loud House	Buford	Episode: "The Odyssey"
2026	Stuart Fails to Save the Universe	Mr. Freeze / Victor Fries	Episode: "Spoiler: We Couldn't Get Green Lantern"

=== Video games ===
Year	Title	Role	Notes
2019	Days Gone	"Iron Mike" Wilcox (voice)	Also motion capture
2025	Marvel's Deadpool VR	Johnny Blaze / Ghost Rider	
