= The Incredible Hulk Returns =

1988 television film directed by Nicholas J. Corea

- Genre: Action; Adventure; Superhero; Drama
- Created by: Kenneth Johnson
- Written by: Nicholas Corea
- Directed by: Nicholas Corea
- Starring: Bill Bixby; Lou Ferrigno; Jack Colvin; Eric Kramer; Steve Levitt
- Theme music composer: Lance Rubin; "The Lonely Man Theme" by Joe Harnell
- Country of origin: United States
- Original language: English

Production
- Executive producers: Bill Bixby; Nicholas Corea
- Producer: Daniel McPhee
- Cinematography: Chuck Colwell
- Editors: Janet Ashikaga; Briana London
- Running time: 93 minutes
- Production companies: Bixby-Brandon Productions; New World Television; Marvel Comics

Original release
- Network: NBC
- Release: May 22, 1988

Related
- The Incredible Hulk; The Trial of the Incredible Hulk

The Incredible Hulk Returns is a 1988 American television superhero film based on the Marvel Comics character the Hulk and serves as a continuation of the 1978–1982 television series The Incredible Hulk. The film premiered on NBC on May 22, 1988.

In The Incredible Hulk Returns, Dr. David Banner, a scientist who transforms into a green-skinned superhuman monster when enraged, has found a potential cure for his condition, but is delayed by the arrival of the arrogant Viking warrior Thor. Bill Bixby returns as Banner and Lou Ferrigno reprises his role of the Hulk. Eric Kramer stars as Thor and Steve Levitt stars as Donald Blake. This was also Jack Colvin's last appearance as Jack McGee.

== Plot ==
Donald Blake and Thor

Dr. David Banner has been gainfully employed at the Joshua-Lambert Research Institute (as David Bannion), where he and a team of scientists are putting the final touches on a Gamma Transponder. The Transponder's public purpose is as an energy source, but Banner has secretly incorporated a secondary function which he intends to use to cure the gamma alteration that transforms him into the Hulk. He has not changed into the Hulk for two years, having met a young widow, Maggie Shaw, with whom he is romantically involved; focusing his thoughts on Shaw allows him to fight back transformations. By chance, he is recognized by a former student of his, Donald Blake. Blake reveals that, on an expedition in Norway, he was bound into possession of a magical hammer containing the soul of Thor, an immortal Viking warrior banished from Valhalla and reluctantly compelled to serve Blake, and can summon Thor by speaking Odin's name. Frustrated by Thor's brutish and moralistic character, Blake wants Banner's advice on severing their bond. Thor is summoned and bullies Banner until he turns into the Hulk. The Hulk battles Thor, leaving the lab severely damaged.

In the morning, Banner scolds Blake for setting back his experiment and demands that he make amends. While ordinarily he leaves the area when the Hulk is sighted, Banner is confident enough that the Transponder will cure him to risk staying. He advises Blake to speak to Thor to learn more about their bond.

Journalist Jack McGee hears of sightings of the Hulk, and his investigations lead him to suspect that David Bannion is the Hulk's human alter ego. When he investigates Bannion's address, Banner puts him off the scent by having Thor answer the door and identify himself as David Bannion. Thor bonds with Blake at a bar, briefly entertaining the possibility of Thor using his powers to fight crime. A mercenary gang outside the Joshua-Lambert Institute seeks to kidnap Banner and the Transponder, but the Hulk effortlessly dispatches them. The mercenary leader Jack LeBeau targets Shaw as a hostage. Mercenaries disguised as police officers ambush and kidnap Shaw despite the combined efforts of the Hulk and Thor. Joshua-Lambert executive Zack Lambert has been working as the mercenaries' inside man as revenge against his overbearing older brother Joshua, but he balks at the kidnapping and is fatally shot.

LeBeau demands the Transponder as the ransom for Shaw. Recognizing its potential as a weapon in the wrong hands, Banner sabotages the Transponder, removing his chance of a cure. Zack contacts Banner from his deathbed and tells him where Shaw is being held. Hulk, Blake, and Thor ambush the gang's hideout and fight them to rescue Shaw. McGee is once again berated by his editor for his obsession with the Hulk and Thor. Blake and Banner agree that Shaw has likely figured out that Banner is the Hulk. Thor and Blake, now at peace with each other, say their goodbyes to Banner. Under threat of McGee finding him if he stays longer, Banner is forced to end his relationship with Shaw and once again leaves to find a cure.

== Cast ==
- Bill Bixby as David Banner
- Lou Ferrigno as Hulk
- Jack Colvin as Jack McGee
- Steve Levitt as Donald Blake
- Eric Allan Kramer as Thor
- Tim Thomerson as Jack LeBeau
- Charles Napier as Mike Fouche
- Lee Purcell as Dr. Margaret Shaw
- John Gabriel as Joshua Lambert
- Carl Ciarfalio as Barner
- Peisha Arten as Girl in Bar (as Peisha McPhee / Bikini Girl)
- Jay Baker as Zachary Lambert

== Production ==
Unlike the preceding series which was produced by MCA/Universal, this film and the following two sequels were produced by New World Television (New World was Marvel's owner at the time) and Bill Bixby's production outfit, which, in association with NBC, took over the Hulk television franchise from former broadcaster CBS.

Bixby recruited Nicholas Corea, who wrote or directed many episodes of the Incredible Hulk TV series, to write and direct The Incredible Hulk Returns. Stan Lee was a consultant on the film. Kenneth Johnson, the creator/executive producer (and sometimes writer/director) of the TV series, was not invited to contribute to the film. Johnson was at the time contracted to the film Short Circuit 2 as director and was "surprised" to learn of the project while working on location in Toronto. In later interviews, Johnson revealed that he did not watch the Hulk television films or discuss them with Bixby until Bixby's death in 1993, despite the two being close friends.

Lou Ferrigno extensively trained to regain the muscle mass required for him to credibly portray the Hulk, putting on 45 pounds in three months.

This television film acted as a backdoor pilot for an unproduced television series featuring Thor, another Marvel Comics character created by Stan Lee and Jack Kirby based on the Norse mythological deity of the same name. Much like the television treatment of the Hulk, Thor's backstory has been altered from his original comic book appearance: while in the comics Donald Blake was an alter ego of Thor and could transform into Thor by use of an enchanted cane, Thor is here depicted as being a servant of Blake and they are two separate entities. In The Incredible Hulk Returns, Thor is neither Asgardian nor a god (though he does once claim to be the "son of Odin"), and is instead described as a long-dead Viking king who was denied access to Valhalla for the sin of arrogance, for which he must perform several heroic acts, similar to the trials of Heracles. Additionally, Thor's powers are more limited than his comic book incarnation; while he has superhuman strength and metabolism, he cannot fly or control the weather, and his hammer is not restricted by the "worthiness enchantment" from the comics. The hammer itself, not named Mjölnir, is used to summon Thor into the mortal world, by which Blake must say Odin's name.

The film was filmed between November 1987 and January 1988 in Los Angeles.

This film is the first time another character from the Marvel Universe or any genuinely supernatural or otherworldly elements appeared in the universe of the Incredible Hulk TV series. Thor and the Hulk next appeared on-screen together in 2012's The Avengers.

On May 21, 1988, one day before the film aired, Ferrigno appeared as a contestant on the game show Family Double Dare to promote it.

== Reception ==
The Incredible Hulk Returns was a major ratings success, outdoing even the high expectations directed to it as a reunion of the Incredible Hulk TV series.

== Home media ==
This television film was released by Anchor Bay Entertainment on May 6, 2003, along with its sequel, The Trial of the Incredible Hulk, as a DVD double feature to coincide with the release of Hulk. They were re-released by Image Entertainment on October 11, 2011.
