= List of comic-based films directed by women =

The following is a list of female directors who have directed, or are in the process of directing, a film based on comics (including comic books, comic strips, manga, and graphic novels). The films include direct-to-video as well as theatrical releases, and may be live action, animated, anime, or a combination thereof.

== Released ==
Director	Film	Based on	Type	Release date
Marguerite Abouet	Aya of Yop City	Aya of Yop City by Marguerite Abouet and Clément Oubrerie	animated	July 17, 2013
Zoya Akhtar	The Archies	Archie Andrews by John L. Goldwater, Bob Montana, and Vic Bloom	live action	December 7, 2023
Lexi Alexander	Punisher: War Zone	Punisher by Gerry Conway, John Romita Sr., and Ross Andru	live action	December 5, 2008
Sólveig Anspach	Lulu in the Nude	Lulu femme nue by Étienne Davodeau	live action	January 22, 2014
Cecilia Aranovich	DC Super Hero Girls: Hero of the Year	DC Super Hero Girls by Lisa Yee, Shea Fontana, and Aria Moffly	animated	August 23, 2016
Cecilia Aranovich	DC Super Hero Girls: Intergalactic Games	DC Super Hero Girls by Lisa Yee, Shea Fontana, and Aria Moffly	animated	May 23, 2017
Cecilia Aranovich	DC Super Hero Girls: Legends of Atlantis	DC Super Hero Girls by Lisa Yee, Shea Fontana, and Aria Moffly	animated	July 22, 2018
Upi Avianto	Sri Asih	Gundala by Harya "Hasmi" Suraminata	live action	November 17, 2022
M. J. Bassett^{2}	Red Sonja	Red Sonja by Dynamite Entertainment	live action	August 13, 2025
Andrea Berloff	The Kitchen	The Kitchen by Ollie Masters and Ming Doyle	live action	August 9, 2019
Marilou Berry	Joséphine, Pregnant & Fabulous	Joséphine by Pénélope Bagieu	live action	February 10, 2016
Maria Blom	Bamse and the Witch's Daughter	Bamse by Rune Andréasson	animated	December 25, 2016
Anna Boden	Captain Marvel	Carol Danvers and Captain Marvel by Roy Thomas, Gene Colan, and Stan Lee	live action	March 8, 2019
Charlotte Le Bon	Falcon Lake	A Sister by Bastien Vivès	live action	May 18, 2022
S. J. Clarkson	Madame Web	Madame Web by Dennis O'Neil and John Romita Jr.	live action	February 14, 2024
Caroline Cowan	Eva & Adam	Eva & Adam by Johan Unenge and Måns Gahrton	live action	August 27, 2021
Jill Culton	Open Season	In the Bleachers by Steve Moore	animated	September 29, 2006
Nia DaCosta	The Marvels	Carol Danvers and Captain Marvel by Roy Thomas, Gene Colan, and Stan Lee	live action	November 10, 2023
Charlotte Dubreuil	Women Only Think That...	Women Have Only One Thing on Their Minds by Georges Wolinski	live action	March 16, 1994
Catti Edfeldt	Eva & Adam – Four Birthdays and a Fiasco	Eva & Adam by Johan Unenge and Måns Gahrton	live action	January 19, 2001
Yngvild Sve Flikke	Ninjababy	Fallteknikk by Inga H Sætre	live action	January 18, 2021
Anne Fontaine	Gemma Bovery	Gemma Bovery by Posy Simmonds	live action	September 10, 2014
Nisha Ganatra	The Hunters	Mirror Mirror by Joshua Williamson	live action	October 25, 2013
Elsa Garagarza	Lego DC Super Hero Girls: Super-Villain High	DC Super Hero Girls by Lisa Yee, Shea Fontana, and Aria Moffly	animated	May 15, 2018
Kosaka Harume	Sailor Moon R: The Movie	Sailor Moon by Naoko Takeuchi	animated	December 5, 1993
Marielle Heller	The Diary of a Teenage Girl	The Diary of a Teenage Girl: An Account in Words and Pictures by Phoebe Gloeckner	live action	August 7, 2015
Carolina Hellsgård	Ever After	Endzeit by Olivia Vieweg	live action	September 7, 2018
Atsuko Ishizuka	Piano no Mori	Piano no Mori by Makoto Isshiki	animated	July 21, 2007
Patty Jenkins	Wonder Woman	Wonder Woman by William Moulton Marston and Harry G. Peter	live action	June 2, 2017
Patty Jenkins	Wonder Woman 1984	Wonder Woman by William Moulton Marston and Harry G. Peter	live action	December 25, 2020
Lynn Johnston	For Better or For Worse: A Storm in April	For Better or For Worse by Lynn Johnston	animated	April 1, 1997
Deborah Kaplan	Josie and the Pussycats	Josie and the Pussycats by Dan DeCarlo	live action	April 11, 2001
Mitsuko Kase	They Were Eleven	They Were Eleven by Moto Hagio	animated	November 1, 1986
Mitsuko Kase	Bats & Terry	Bats & Terry by Yasuichi Oshima	animated	March 14, 1987
Mitsuko Kase	She, the Ultimate Weapon: Another Love Song	Saikano by Shin Takahashi	animated	September 21, 2005
Chiaki Kon	Junjō Romantica	Junjo Romantica: Pure Romance by Shungiku Nakamura	animated	December 20, 2012
Chiaki Kon	Pretty Guardian Sailor Moon Eternal Part 1	Sailor Moon by Naoko Takeuchi	animated	January 8, 2021
Chiaki Kon	Pretty Guardian Sailor Moon Eternal Part 2	Sailor Moon by Naoko Takeuchi	animated	February 11, 2021
Mélanie Laurent	Wingwomen	La Grande Odalisque by Jérôme Mulot, Florent Ruppert, and Bastien Vivès	live action	November 1, 2023
Blandine Lenoir	Juliette in Spring	Juliette, the Ghosts Return in the Spring by Camille Jourdy	live action	June 12, 2024
Murielle Magellan	The Blank Page	The Blank Page by Pénélope Bagieu and Boulet	live action	August 24, 2022
Victoria Mahoney	The Old Guard 2	Old Guard by Greg Rucka and Leandro Fernández	live action	July 2, 2025
Kelly Marcel	Venom: The Last Dance	Venom by Todd McFarlane and David Michelinie	live action	October 25, 2024
Rie Matsumoto	King of the Restaurant of Kings	Blood Blockade Battlefront by Yasuhiro Nightow	animated	June 3, 2016
Mayumi Miyasaka	Tenshi	Angel Nest by Erica Sakurazawa	live action	January 21, 2006
Lauren Montgomery	Superman: Doomsday	The Death of Superman by Dan Jurgens, Louise Simonson, and Roger Stern	animated	September 18, 2007
Lauren Montgomery	Wonder Woman	Wonder Woman by William Moulton Marston and Harry G. Peter	animated	March 3, 2009
Lauren Montgomery	Green Lantern: First Flight	Hal Jordan by John Broome and Gil Kane	animated	July 28, 2009
Lauren Montgomery	Justice League: Crisis on Two Earths	JLA: Earth 2 by Grant Morrison and Frank Quitely	animated	February 23, 2010
Lauren Montgomery	Superman/Batman: Apocalypse	Superman/Batman by Jeph Loeb and Ed McGuinness	animated	September 28, 2010
Lauren Montgomery	Green Lantern: Emerald Knights	Hal Jordan by John Broome and Gil Kane	animated	June 7, 2011
Lauren Montgomery	Batman: Year One	Batman: Year One by Frank Miller and David Mazzucchelli	animated	October 18, 2011
Lauren Montgomery	Catwoman	Catwoman by Bill Finger and Bob Kane	animated	October 18, 2011
Lauren Montgomery	Justice League: Doom	JLA: Tower of Babel by Mark Waid and John Kalisz	animated	February 28, 2012
Makoto Moriwaki	High School! Kimengumi Movie	High School! Kimengumi by Motoei Shinzawa	animated	July 12, 1986
Makoto Moriwaki	Those Obnoxious Aliens: Date with a Spirit	Urusei Yatsura by Rumiko Takahashi	animated	June 21, 1991
Makoto Moriwaki	Rakusho! Hyper Doll	Hyper Doll by Shimpei Itoh	animated	November 25, 1995
Makoto Moriwaki	Alternative One: Opera Kobayashi and the Five Paintings	Tantei Opera Milky Holmes by Bushiroad	animated	August 25, 2012
Makoto Moriwaki	Alternative Two: Opera Kobayashi and the Raven of the Empty Sky	Tantei Opera Milky Holmes by Bushiroad	animated	January 9, 2013
Valérie Müller	Polina	Polina by Bastien Vivès	live action	November 16, 2016
Mika Ninagawa	Sakuran	Sakuran by Moyoco Anno	live action	February 24, 2007
Mika Ninagawa	Helter Skelter	Helter Skelter by Kyoko Okazaki	live action	July 14, 2012
Mika Ninagawa	xxxHolic	xxxHolic by Clamp	live action	April 29, 2022
Alice O'Fredericks	Father of Four	Far til fire by Kaj Engholm and Olav Hast	live action	November 2, 1953
Alice O'Fredericks	Father of Four in the Snow	Far til fire by Kaj Engholm and Olav Hast	live action	November 1, 1954
Alice O'Fredericks	Father of Four in the Country	Far til fire by Kaj Engholm and Olav Hast	live action	November 7, 1955
Alice O'Fredericks	Father of Four in the City	Far til fire by Kaj Engholm and Olav Hast	live action	November 12, 1956
Alice O'Fredericks	Father of Four and Uncle Sofus	Far til fire by Kaj Engholm and Olav Hast	live action	November 25, 1957
Alice O'Fredericks	Father of Four and the Wolf Cubs	Far til fire by Kaj Engholm and Olav Hast	live action	November 10, 1958
Alice O'Fredericks	Father of Four on Bornholm	Far til fire by Kaj Engholm and Olav Hast	live action	December 26, 1959
Alice O'Fredericks	Father of Four with Full Music	Far til fire by Kaj Engholm and Olav Hast	live action	December 15, 1961
Agnès Obadia	Joséphine	Joséphine by Pénélope Bagieu	live action	June 19, 2013
Marie-Pascale Osterrieth	The Demon Stirs	Le Démon de midi by Florence Cestac	live action	June 22, 2005
Keiko Oyamada	Little Nemo: Adventures in Slumberland	Little Nemo by Winsor McCay	animated	July 15, 1989
Gina Prince-Bythewood	The Old Guard	Old Guard by Greg Rucka and Leandro Fernández	live action	July 10, 2020
Noémie Saglio	Natacha (Almost) a Flight Attendant	Natacha by François Walthéry and Roland Goossens	live action	April 2, 2025
Marjane Satrapi	Persepolis	Persepolis by Marjane Satrapi	animated	June 27, 2007
Marjane Satrapi	Chicken with Plums	Chicken with Plums by Marjane Satrapi	live action	October 26, 2011
Marjane Satrapi	Radioactive	Radioactive: Marie & Pierre Curie: A Tale of Love and Fallout by Lauren Redniss	live action	September 14, 2019
Kiyoko Sayama	Angel Sanctuary	Angel Sanctuary by Kaori Yuki	animated	August 25, 2000
Dagmar Seume	Wendy – The Film	Wendy by DC Thomson and Egmont Ehapa	live action	January 26, 2017
Cate Shortland	Black Widow	Black Widow by Stan Lee, Don Rico, and Don Heck	live action	July 9, 2021
Gail Simone	Red Sonja: Queen of Plagues	Red Sonja by Dynamite Entertainment	animated	August 2, 2016
Shari Springer Berman	American Splendor	American Splendor and Our Cancer Year by Harvey Pekar, Robert Crumb, Gary Dumm, Frank Stack, and Joyce Brabner	live action	August 15, 2003
Noriko Takao	Saint Young Men	Saint Young Men by Hikaru Nakamura	animated	May 10, 2013
Noriko Takao	Saint Oniisan	Saint Young Men by Hikaru Nakamura	animated	August 23, 2013
Rachel Talalay	Tank Girl	Tank Girl by Jamie Hewlett and Alan Martin	live action	March 31, 1995
The Wachowskis^{1}	Speed Racer	Mach GoGoGo by Tatsuo Yoshida	live action	May 9, 2008
Naoko Yamada	K-On! The Movie	K-On! by Kakifly	animated	December 3, 2011
Naoko Yamada	A Silent Voice	A Silent Voice by Yoshitoki Ōima	animated	September 17, 2016
Cathy Yan	Birds of Prey	Birds of Prey by Jordan B. Gorfinkel and Chuck Dixon	live action	February 7, 2020
Chloé Zhao	Eternals	Eternals by Jack Kirby	live action	November 5, 2021

== See also ==
- List of comic-based television episodes directed by women
- List of LGBT-related films directed by women
- List of films directed by women
- Women's cinema
- List of lesbian filmmakers
- List of films based on manga
- List of American superhero films
- List of films based on comics
  - List of films based on English-language comics
  - List of films based on French-language comics
- List of films based on Marvel Comics publications
  - List of Marvel Cinematic Universe films
  - Sony's Spider-Man Universe
  - List of unproduced film projects based on Marvel Comics
  - List of unproduced films based on Marvel Comics imprints publications
- List of films based on DC Comics publications
  - DC Extended Universe
  - List of unproduced DC Comics projects
  - List of unproduced films based on DC Comics imprints
- List of television series and films based on Dark Horse Comics publications
  - List of unproduced Dark Horse projects
- List of television series and films based on Harvey Comics publications
- List of television series and films based on Archie Comics publications
- List of television series and films based on Image Comics publications
  - List of unproduced Image Comics projects

== Notes ==
1. The Wachowskis have since announced publicly their transition as trans women, with Larry/Lana in 2008 and Andy/Lilly in 2016.
2. M. J. Bassett has since announced publicly their transition as a trans woman in 2017.
