= Flutter =

Flutter may refer to:

== Technology ==
- Aeroelastic flutter, a rapid self-feeding motion, potentially destructive, that is excited by aerodynamic forces in aircraft and bridges
- Flutter (American company), a gesture recognition technology company acquired by Google in 2013
- Flutter (electronics and communication), any rapid variation of signal parameters
- Flutter (software), an open source UI framework and SDK for building multi-platform apps

== Medicine ==
- "Heart flutter", an abnormally rapid heartbeat:
  - Atrial flutter, a common abnormal heart rhythm
  - Ventricular flutter, a tachycardia affecting the ventricles with a rate over 250-350 beats/min
- Flutter valve, a one-way valve used in respiratory medicine to prevent air from travelling back along a chest tube

== Arts and entertainment ==
- Flutter (comics), a comic series

=== Music ===
- Flutter-tonguing, a technique for playing wind instruments
- Flutter, a 2001 album and a composition by Otomo Yoshihide's New Jazz Quintet
- "Flutter", a song by Bonobo from his 2003 album Dial 'M' for Monkey
- "Flutter", a song by Autechre from the 1994 EP Anti EP

=== Film ===
- Flutter (2006 film), 2006 animated short by Howie Shia
- Flutter (2011 film), 2011 film directed by Giles Borg

== Other uses ==
- Fluttershy, a My Little Pony character
- Flutter Entertainment, an Irish-headquartered betting company
- Flutter, a colloquial term for a small bet or wager in gambling
- Flutter kick, a movement used in swimming or callisthenics

== See also ==
- Controlled aerodynamic instability phenomena
- Wow (recording)
- Wow and flutter measurement
- Wow and flutter (disambiguation)
