= List of television series and films based on Harvey Comics publications =

This is a list of television series and films based on Harvey Comics publications. It includes live-action and animated films, theatrical releases, direct-to-video releases, and television film releases.

== Television ==
=== Live-action ===
Title	Aired	Seasons	Network	Notes
Richie Rich	2015	2 seasons	Netflix	21 episodes
In development
Casper the Friendly Ghost	TBA	TBA	Disney+	TBA

=== Animated series ===
Title	Original running	Production company(s)	Network	Notes
The Harveytoons Show	1950–1962	Famous Studios	Syndication	78 episodes
Matty's Funday Funnies	1959–1962	Famous Studios	ABC	75 episodes
The New Casper Cartoon Show	1963	Paramount Cartoon Studios	NBC	13 episodes
Casper and the Angels	1979	Hanna-Barbera Productions	ABC	26 episodes
Richie Rich (1980 TV series)	1980–1983	Hanna-Barbera Productions	ABC	41 episodes
The Richie Rich/Scooby-Doo Show	1980–1981	Hanna-Barbera Productions	ABC	21 episodes
The Pac-Man/Little Rascals/Richie Rich Show	1982–1983	Hanna-Barbera Productions/King World Productions	ABC	13 episodes
The Monchhichis/Little Rascals/Richie Rich Show	1983–1984	Hanna-Barbera Productions/King World Productions	ABC	13 episodes
The Baby Huey Show	1994–1995	Carbunkle Cartoons; Film Roman	Syndication	26 episodes
Richie Rich (1996 TV series)	1996	Jeffrey A. Montgomery Productions/The Harvey Entertainment Company/Film Roman	Syndication	13 episodes
The Spooktacular New Adventures of Casper	1996–1998	Amblin Television/The Harvey Entertainment Company/Universal Cartoon Studios	Fox Kids	52 episodes
Casper's Scare School	2009–2012	Classic Media/MoonScoop Group/DQ Entertainment	TF1; Cartoon Network	52 episodes
Harvey Street Kids	2018–2020	DreamWorks Animation Television	Netflix Streaming Services	52 episodes

== Film ==
=== Theatrical films ===
Year	Title	Production studio	Notes
1957	The Sad Sack	Paramount Pictures	
1994	Richie Rich	Warner Bros. Family Entertainment	
1995	Casper	Universal Pictures/Amblin Entertainment	First film directed by Brad Silberling.

=== Direct-to-video and TV films ===
Year	Title	Production studio	Notes
1997	Casper: A Spirited Beginning	20th Century Fox Home Entertainment/Saban Entertainment	A prequel to Casper.
1998	Casper Meets Wendy	20th Century Fox Home Entertainment/Saban Entertainment	A sequel to Casper: A Spirited Beginning.
1998	Richie Rich's Christmas Wish	Warner Bros. Family Entertainment/Saban Entertainment	A sequel to Richie Rich.
1999	Baby Huey's Great Easter Adventure	Sony Pictures Home Entertainment	
2000	Casper's Haunted Christmas	Universal Pictures Home Entertainment/Rainmaker Entertainment	
2006	Casper's Scare School	Philips Filmstudio Inc.	

== Reception ==
=== Box office ===
Film	Distributor(s)	Release date	Budget	Box office revenue			Box office ranking	
Film	Distributor(s)	Release date	Budget	Domestic	Foreign	Worldwide	All time domestic	All time worldwide
The Sad Sack	Paramount Pictures	November 27, 1957	N/A	$3,500,000	$1,878,519	$5,378,519	N/A	N/A
Richie Rich	Warner Bros. Family Entertainment	December 21, 1994	$40 million	$38,087,756	—N/a	—N/a	#2,027	N/A
Casper	Universal Pictures/Amblin Entertainment	May 26, 1995	$55 million	$100,328,194	$187,600,000	$287,928,194	#617	#380
Total			$95 million	$141,915,950	$189,478,519	$293,306,713	#2,644	#380

=== Critical and public reception ===
Film	Rotten Tomatoes	Metacritic	CinemaScore
The Sad Sack	—N/a	—N/a	—N/a
Richie Rich	24% (21 reviews)	—N/a	A−
Casper	50% (40 reviews)	—N/a	A
Casper: A Spirited Beginning	0% (5 reviews)	—N/a	—N/a
Casper Meets Wendy	17% (6 reviews)	—N/a	—N/a
Richie Rich's Christmas Wish	33% (3 reviews)	—N/a	—N/a
Baby Huey's Great Easter Adventure	N/A	—N/a	—N/a
Casper's Haunted Christmas	39% (2 reviews)	—N/a	—N/a
Casper's Scare School	60% (1 reviews)	—N/a	—N/a
List indicator: A dark grey cell indicates information is not available for the film.

== See also ==
- Harvey Films
- Casper the Friendly Ghost in film
- List of television series based on Marvel Comics publications
- List of films based on Marvel Comics publications
- List of unproduced Marvel Comics projects
- List of unproduced television projects based on Marvel Comics
- List of television series based on DC Comics publications
- List of films based on DC Comics publications
- List of unproduced DC Comics projects
- List of television series and films based on Dark Horse Comics publications
- List of unproduced Dark Horse projects
- List of television series and films based on Image Comics publications
- List of unproduced Image Comics projects
- List of television series and films based on Archie Comics publications
- List of television programs based on comics
- List of films based on comics
- List of comic-based films directed by women
- List of comic-based television episodes directed by women
