= List of unproduced Dark Horse Comics projects =

This is a list of unmade and unreleased projects based on Dark Horse Comics publications. Some of these productions were, or still are, in "development hell". Projects that have not provided significant production announcements within at least a year, would be considered in development limbo until further announcements are released. The following include films, television shows and video games, whether as live-action or animated productions.

== Hellboy ==
=== Hellboy III ===
In July 2008, Guillermo del Toro expressed his interest in directing a third Hellboy film, saying that he would work on the film after finishing The Hobbit. In 2010, during the production of the unmade At the Mountain of Madness, del Toro mentioned that he would direct Hellboy III after his next project, even though the script was not yet written. del Toro later said in 2013 that the film was unlikely to be released, and suggested the possibility of telling its story in comic book form. Hellboy creator Mike Mignola refused to accept the idea.

In a Reddit AMA from July 2014, del Toro said:

Well, you know, we don't have that movie on the horizon, but the idea for it was to have Hellboy finally come to terms with the fact that his destiny, his inevitable destiny, is to become the beast of the Apocalypse, and having him and Liz face the sort of, that part of his nature, and he has to do it, in order to be able to ironically vanquish the foe that he has to face in the 3rd film. He has to become the beast of the Apocalypse to be able to defend humanity, but at the same time, he becomes a much darker being. It's a very interesting ending to mthe series, but I don't think it will happen. ... We have gone through basically every studio and asked for financing, and they are not interested. I think that the first movie made its budget back, and a little bit of profit, but then it was very very big on video and DVD. The story repeated itself with the second already, it made its money back at the box office, but a small margin of profit in the release of the theatrical print, but was very very big on DVD and video. Sadly now from a business point of view all the studios know is that you don't have that safety net of the DVD and video, so they view the project as dangerous.

Although Ron Perlman revealed that he was working on a new Hellboy film, and del Toro was unlikely to return, del Toro later revealed that the third Hellboy movie was scrapped. A reboot was released in April 2019 with no involvement from Del Toro.

=== Hellboy: Silverlance ===
In 2010, Hellboy screenwriter Peter Briggs was asked by Universal to script a spin-off centering on Prince Nuada, and provisionally agreed that Briggs could direct the film in New Zealand. Briggs began work on an outline with co-writer Aaron Mason. Titled Hellboy: Silverlance, the script was a B.P.R.D. story featuring Abe Sapien as the main character with Hellboy in a supporting role. Moving into the new B.P.R.D. headquarters in Colorado, Abe is troubled by his psychic connection with Princess Nuala, and begins researching the elves' history. The film would have shown Nuada's adventures throughout history, including his rivalry with a fairy courtier who orchestrates Nuada's exile in hopes of marrying Nuala and seizing control of the fairy kingdom; Nuada first meeting Mister Wink by saving him from a troupe of soldiers during the Spanish Inquisition; and Nuada in Nazi Germany, engineering a pact to keep various supernatural entities safe during World War II (with Nuada and Kroenen fighting in a "friendly" match for Project Ragnarok men). Doug Jones would have played both Abe and the Angel of Death, who strikes a bargain with Nuada. Rupert Evans's Agent Myers would also have returned. The story climaxed at the new B.P.R.D. headquarters, with the return of Rasputin's summoning gauntlet. Universal wanted to proceed with the project, but it emerged that del Toro's Hellboy 3 was still a possibility, so Silverlance was shelved. In 2015, Briggs received another call from Universal, saying that Hellboy 3 had been cancelled and asking him and Mason to return for a reworked Silverlance, with producers del Toro and Lawrence Gordon involved. The caveat was that Hellboy could not appear, but the writers managed to get the character a cameo appearance at the climax. If successful, the film would have launched a From the Files of the B.P.R.D. spin-off series. In May 2017, Briggs affirmed that, with the announcement of the Hellboy reboot, the Silverlance project was dead.

=== Hellboy: The Phantom Claw film ===
A third animated Hellboy film, The Phantom Claw, was planned. Tad Stones, writer of Hellboy: Sword of Storms and Hellboy: Blood and Iron, said the film would have starred Lobster Johnson and have some familiar characters. The film was ultimately canceled.

== Black Hammer ==
=== Black Hammer film ===
In 2018, Legendary Entertainment signed a film deal with Dark Horse, which included a Black Hammer film.

=== Black Hammer TV series ===
In 2018, Legendary also signed a TV deal with Dark Horse for a Black Hammer television series.

== The Mask ==
=== The Mask II ===
Not long after the release of The Mask, an issue of Nintendo Power revealed that Jim Carrey would be returning in a sequel called The Mask II. The magazine held a contest where the first prize would be awarded a walk-on role in the film. Director Chuck Russell, who helmed the original film, expressed his interest in a Mask sequel in his 1996 Laserdisc commentary. He was hoping Carrey would come back as the title character, along with Amy Yasbeck, who played reporter Peggy Brandt in the original. In a 1995 Barbara Walters Special, Carrey revealed that he was offered $10 million to star in The Mask II, but turned it down, because his experiences on Ace Ventura: When Nature Calls convinced him that reprising a character he'd previously played offered him no challenges as an actor. Due to Carrey declining to reprise his role, the project never came to fruition, and the concept for the sequel was completely changed. The winner of the failed contest was given $5000 and other prizes, and was issued an apology in the final issue of Nintendo Power in 2012.

In 2001, Lance Khazei was asked by New Line Cinema to write a new script for a sequel to The Mask. Nothing came from this version of the sequel and the film was changed into the critically despised, box-office disaster Son of the Mask.

=== The Mask reboot ===
In August 2014, Mike Richardson said: "We've been talking about reviving The Mask, both in film and in comics. We've had a couple of false starts". There have been no further announcements other than director Sébastien Vaniček expressing interest in directing a new adaptation in 2026.

== Other ==
=== Sin City 3 ===
Wallace was set to appear in Sin City 3, to be directed by Robert Rodriguez and Frank Miller. Rodriguez said he wanted Johnny Depp to play the part. Depp was originally supposed to play the part of Benicio del Toro's Jack "Jackie Boy" Rafferty, but filming of Sin City conflicted with that of Depp's schedule on other projects. Depp has expressed great interest in being a part of the Sin City franchise.

=== Concrete film ===
In 1993, a Concrete film was in pre-production during the early 1990s, with a script written by Larry Wilson and Paul Chadwick. The film was cancelled.

=== Hard Boiled film ===
In 2001, Warner Brothers was in negotiations with Miller and Darrow to adapt the comic book into a film, David Fincher set to direct and Nicolas Cage to star. The website comics2film stated that Cage informed Cinescape magazine that he was working to produce the film under his company, Saturn Films. In 2008, Miller said that he would be directing the film version. In 2013, Vehicle 19 director Mukunda Michael Dewil said that he wanted to direct the film version. In 2016, Warner Bros. re-acquired the rights to Hard Boiled with Ben Wheatley and was looking to reteam with his High-Rise star Tom Hiddleston for the film. There have been no further announcements since.

=== ArchEnemies film ===
As of September 2006, Sam Raimi has signed a deal to adapt the series into a film. Screenwriter Patrick O'Neill (Knight and Day), was hired to write the script; Raimi was attached to act as producer along with Mike Richardson and Josh Donen. There have been no further announcements since.

=== Monkeyman and O'Brien TV series ===
On January 1, 2000, it was revealed that producer Jeff Kline was awaiting a pick-up order from the Fox Kids Network for a cel-animated Monkeyman and O'Brien series. The production had gotten as far as scripting (with significant input from creator Art Adams).

=== The Black Pearl film ===
Although The Black Pearl was originally co-written with his cousin, Eric Johnson, as a screenplay, Mark Hamill has reported difficulties getting Hollywood to make a film adaptation that matches his vision for the project. He first expressed a strong desire to direct a film version of the story in January 1996, months before the first issue hit newsstands. Hamill has allowed multiple production deals to elapse and announced several projected dates for the start of filming. At the L.A. Comedy Shorts Film Festival on April 17, 2010, Hamill said that he secured backing from British investors for a $7 million budget, and that he will direct the film. He made a formal announcement at the Cannes Film Festival in May. Hamill described his vision for the project as a "dark, edgy thriller" and that he was seeking an "R" rating for the completed film.

=== Damn Nation film ===
In 2009, a Damn Nation film was announced by Paramount Pictures, to be written by Ashley Edward Miller and Zack Stentz.

=== Fear Agent film ===
In July 2009, Universal Pictures was in the early stages of developing a film based on the Fear Agent comic series.

=== The Umbrella Academy film ===
A film version of the comic book series The Umbrella Academy was optioned by Universal Studios. Originally, screenwriter Mark Bomback was hired to write the screenplay; Rawson Marshall Thurber reportedly replaced him in 2010. There had been little talk of the film from that time. In an interview with Newsarama at the 2012 New York Comic Con, Way mentioned that there have been "good talks" and a "really good script", but that it was "kind of up to the universe". The project was revived by Netflix who released The Umbrella Academy series in 2019.

=== The Strange Case of Hyde film ===
In July 2010, Dark Horse was developing a film version of The Strange Case of Hyde with comic writer Cole Haddon writing the screenplay. Albert Torres was writing the new script in 2012. There have been no further developments since.

=== Beasts of Burden film ===
In 2011, CG-animated film adaptation was announced via Reel FX Creative Studios with filmmaker Andrew Adamson scheduled to produce and writer Darren Lemke attached to write the screenplay. Shane Acker was chosen to direct the film in 2013, with Mike Richardson and Aron Warner joining Adamson as producers.

=== Charles Fort film ===
In October 2011, Robert Zemeckis was producing a Charles Fort film with Evan Spiliotopoulos writing the script. There has been no further announcements since.

=== Mind MGMT film ===
In January 2013, Ridley Scott was set to produce the MIND MGMT comic book film, along with Dark Horse Entertainment's Mike Richardson and Keith Goldberg. Kindt acted as a consultant for the film and shared the complete outline for the story with Scott and David James Kelly the screenwriter. He believed Scott had "a good take on it" and did not mind if it was not a faithful adaption. The option was renewed twice to give the screenwriter more time to work. In July 2017, Universal Cable Productions announced to produce a TV series based on the comic, instead of the film, with Daniel Cerone as the showrunner.

=== Timecop reboot ===
In 2014, The Hollywood Reporter wrote that Universal Studios was developing a reboot of Timecop due to success of the 2012 time travelling film Looper. Richardson was to be the executive producer. There have been no further developments since.

=== Breath of Bones film ===
In September 2014, Andrew Adamson was attached to direct the film adaptation of Breath of Bones. There have been no further developments since.

=== Harrow County TV series ===
Universal Cable Productions and Dark Horse revealed a Harrow County television series in July 2015. There has been no further developments since.

=== Blood Brothers film ===
In August 2015, Metro-Goldwyn-Mayer was looking for a writer/director for the Blood Brothers film with Michael B. Jordan in talks to star. There have been no further developments since.

=== Untitled 300: Rise of an Empire sequel ===
In March 2016, Zack Snyder said that more sequels could go to topics beyond Ancient Greece, like the American Revolutionary War or a battle in China.

In May 2021, Snyder revealed that he had written an Alexander the Great film that was intended to function as a conclusion to the 300 trilogy, but it evolved into having a greater focus on a love story between Alexander and Hephaestion, leading Snyder to think it could not function as a third 300 film. The script was retitled Blood and Ashes but it failed to be greenlit by Warner Bros. Pictures.

=== Freaks Of the Heartland TV series ===
In October 2016, MTV and Dark Horse announced a Freaks Of the Heartland TV series with David Gordon Green directing the pilot and producing the series. There have been no further developments since.

=== Flutter TV series ===
In July 2017, Dark Horse Entertainment and Universal Cable Productions revealed that Flutter had been optioned for a television series. The comic series was to be adapted for television by Katherine Lindberg and Sense8 producer Marc Rosen. There has been no further announcements since.

=== Briggs Land TV series ===
In May 2016, Dark Horse planned a television series based on the Briggs Land comic series, with AMC Studios and A24. There has been no further announcements since.

=== The Amazing Screw-On Head TV series ===
On July 12, 2006, The Amazing Screw-On Head TV pilot was aired online at scifi.com with a survey to decide whether or not the show went to series. According to Mike Mignola on the November 29 Fanboy Radio podcast the same year, the series was not picked up by the Sci-Fi Channel.

=== Apocalypse Nerd TV miniseries ===
Fantagraphics, who publish much of Bagge's work, reported in early 2010 that Apocalypse Nerd was going to be adapted as a six-part series for television by Nois Productions (Alex Carvalho/Tupaq Felber) and the pilot was being pitched to BBC. There has been no further announcements.

=== Criminal Macabre: A Cal McDonald Mystery film ===
A Cal McDonald film was said to be on the way, but due to the nature of the character, Steve Niles did not want to compromise or "water down" Cal McDonald, making it tough to find a studio that will finance the film as is. Universal Pictures signed a deal to produce a Criminal Macabre film with Kyle Ward scripting. It was set for release in 2010, but there have been no further announcements.

=== House of Gold & Bones film ===
At a signing, Corey Taylor revealed that he had plans to turn the double album into a film: "Once we've toured and we've got the music out to everyone, the thing I really wanna do is have two movies—Part 1 and Part 2. With the comic and the story and the music, I think we'll be able to do it. I already know who I wanna talk to about doing it, so we'll see what happens". Taylor has further said that he was looking at his and Shawn Crahan's new film production company Living Breathing Films to make the film. There have been no further announcements.

=== Jingle Belle film ===
In 1999, Jingle Belle was to be adapted as a live-action feature film by Revolution Studios, scripted by Gina Wendkos (Jersey Girl, Coyote Ugly, The Princess Diaries). Paul Dini said he has received proposals to do film adaptations, but did not want to give up ownership or control of the character.

=== Untitled Aliens vs. Predator: Requiem sequel ===
In 2007, during the production of Aliens vs. Predator: Requiem, based on the comic series, the Brothers Strause expressed plans for a third Alien vs. Predator installment. In June 2018, Shane Black, the director of The Predator, expressed his belief that a third Alien vs. Predator could still happen, indicating the studio's interest in both franchises.

=== Last Man Standing: Killbook of a Bounty Hunter film ===
At the 2010 San Diego Comic-Con, Paramount Pictures acquired the film rights for the series. There have been no further announcements.

=== Rex Mundi film ===
There have been a number of rumours about a film version of Rex Mundi. In 2006, Jim Uhls was hired to write a script for Johnny Depp to star in and produce. It is not known how much further production has progressed since then. Arvid Nelson confirmed the rumor of the film, and working with Johnny Depp. In December 2008, Nelson described that "the wheels of Hollywood grind slowly. ... We are at a second revision of the screenplay, so that's good. The way this works is there are periods of feverish activity, followed by lulls ... We're in one of the lulls now". An interview with MTV's Splash Page in March 2009 confirmed the film was still progressing and searching for a director.

=== The Secret film ===
In 2009, Universal Pictures acquired the rights to make a film adaptation of The Secret. Mike Richardson was set to produce, along with Scott Stuber. There have been no further announcements.

=== Sock Monkey film ===
In 2014, millionaire and animator Matt Danner created an proof-of-concept short based on the comic Sock Monkey to promote an upcoming live-action/animated feature. The film, to be written and directed by Danner, was to be based on the storybook Sock Monkey Into the Deep Woods. As of April 2017, they were currently shopping around Hollywood to find investors that are interested in the film. There have been no further announcements.

=== Emily the Strange film ===
Since 2000, Rob Reger has been trying to make a feature film adaptation of Emily the Strange. In 2005, it was reported that 20th Century Fox Animation would make a live action/animated feature film, with Chris Meledandri and John Cohen producing it. In 2008, Mike Richardson, of Dark Horse Entertainment, came on board as a producer. The same year it was unofficially reported that the film had moved to Universal Studios' owned Illumination Entertainment, along with the studio's founders, Meledandri and Cohen. Universal Studios acquired the rights to the comic in September 2010, and the actress Chloë Grace Moretz was cast in the role of Emily. Melisa Wallack, who wrote the script for Mirror Mirror, was hired to write the adaptation in August 2011. Two months later it was confirmed that the film was indeed in the works at Illumination Entertainment. Kealan O’Rourke rewrote the film's script. In December 2016, Universal abandoned the project, and Dark Horse Entertainment and Amazon Studios were in negotiations to make an animated film. There have been no further announcements.

=== Barb Wire video game ===
GT Interactive announced that they would be publishing a video game based on the film Barb Wire for the PlayStation, Saturn, PC, and Macintosh in January 1997. The developer was Cryo Interactive. The gameplay was said to be similar to Resident Evil, with a single-player campaign and a two-player deathmatch mode. The game was never released.

=== Enemy TV series ===
In 2016, Dark Horse Entertainment and TriStar Television planned a television series based on the graphic novel Enemy.

=== Shaolin Cowboy and the Tomb of Doom film ===
In 2008, The Wachowskis were reported of being working with Madhouse to make an animated film adaptation of the Shaolin Cowboy comic book series. The film's title was eventually revealed as Shaolin Cowboy and the Tomb of Doom. Darrow and Japanese director Seiji Mizushima were attached to direct the film. However, according to Darrow, the film's production was finally left unfinished after the lack of money.

=== Wyrd TV series ===
On December 16, 2020, FX were reported of being working with 20th Television, A+E Studios & Vendetta Prods. to make a television series adaptation of the Wyrd comic book series written by Sheldon Turner, with Matthew Rhys set to star and produce with Keri Russell.

== See also ==
- Dark Horse Comics
- Dark Horse Entertainment
- List of television series and films based on Dark Horse Comics publications
- List of unproduced film projects based on Marvel Comics
  - List of unproduced television projects based on Marvel Comics
  - List of unproduced films based on Marvel Comics imprints publications
- List of unproduced DC Comics projects
  - List of unproduced films based on DC Comics imprints
- List of unproduced Image Comics projects
- List of comic-based films directed by women
