= Dark Horse Entertainment =

Movie and television production organization

- Type: Division
- Industry: Entertainment
- Founded: 1992; 34 years ago
- Founder: Mike Richardson; Eric Paul Shaffer
- Area served: Worldwide
- Products: Film; Television
- Parent: Dark Horse Media
- Divisions: Dark Horse Indie
- Website: dhentertainment.com

Dark Horse Entertainment is a motion picture and television production arm of American comic book publishing company Dark Horse Comics, founded in 1992. They also have a sub-label, Dark Horse Indie. They have their headquarters in Milwaukie, Oregon.

== Productions ==
=== Series ===
The following are Dark Horse Entertainment TV projects based on Dark Horse comic books:

==== Series based on Dark Horse Comics publications ====
- Duckman (1994–1997, animated series)
- The Mask: Animated Series (1995–1997, animated series)
- Timecop (1997–1998)
- Big Guy and Rusty the Boy Robot (1999–2001, animated series)
- Dark Matter (2015–2017)
- The Umbrella Academy (2019–2024)
- Resident Alien (2021–2025)
- Samurai Rabbit: The Usagi Chronicles (2022, animated series)
- Grendel (TBA)
- Mind MGMT (TBA)
- Minor Threats (TBA)
- She Could Fly (TBA)
- Wyrd (TBA)

==== Series not based on Dark Horse Comics publications ====
- Coyote (2021)
- Revenge Inc. (TBA)

=== Films ===
The following are feature films based on series from Dark Horse Comics:

==== Films based on Dark Horse Comics publications ====
- The Mask (1994)
- Timecop (1994)
- Enemy (1996)
- Barb Wire (1996)
- Virus (1999)
- Mystery Men (1999)
- American Splendor (2003)
- Timecop 2: The Berlin Decision (2003)
- Hellboy (2004)
- Son of the Mask (2005)
- Hellboy II: The Golden Army (2008)
- R.I.P.D. (2013)
- Polar (2019)
- Hellboy (2019)
- Chickenhare and the Hamster of Darkness (2022, animated film)
- R.I.P.D. 2: Rise of the Damned (2022)
- Hellboy: The Crooked Man (2024)
- Chickenhare and the Secret of the Groundhog (2025, animated film)
- Bang! (TBA)
- Dept. H (TBA)
- Emily the Strange (TBA, animated film)
- Lady Killer (TBA)
- Mystery Girl (TBA)
- The Black Kaiser (TBA)
- The Goon (TBA, animated film)

==== Films not based on Dark Horse Comics publications ====
- Dr. Giggles (1992)
- My Name Is Bruce (2007)
- 30 Days of Night (2007)
- Bill Russell: Legend (2023)
- Kill Me (2026)

==== Dark Horse Indie ====
- Monarch of the Moon (2005)
- Splinter (2006)
- Driftwood (2006)
- Mr. Warmth: The Don Rickles Project (2007)

== See also ==
- Dark Horse Comics
- List of television series and films based on Dark Horse Comics publications
- List of unproduced Dark Horse Comics projects
