= List of unproduced films based on DC Comics imprints =

This is a list of unproduced projects based on DC Comics imprints. Some of these productions were, or still are, in development hell. Films and TV shows that have not provided significant production announcements within at least a year would be considered in development limbo until further announcements are released. All of the unproduced films and shows are based on DC Comics imprints (Vertigo, WildStorm, Mad, Paradox Press).

== List ==
=== Fables ===
==== Fables TV series ====
A television series based on Fables was put into development by NBC in 2005 for the 2006–2007 season. The show received a script order and was developed by Craig Silverstein and Warner Bros. Television but was not developed any further than the scripting stage. NBC would later go on to produce Grimm, a police procedural set in a world where fairytales are real.

ABC picked up the rights to develop a pilot of Fables for the 2009–2010 television season in December 2008. Six Degrees creators and executive producers Stu Zicherman and Raven Metzner were writing the script for the hour-long drama, again set up at Warner Brothers Television, while David Semel came on board to direct. However, in December 2010, Willingham said, in an interview with Io9, that the ABC show is "probably dead", though he also admits to being "out of the loop".

==== Fables film ====
In 2015, Warner Bros. was developing a live action Fables film with David Heyman and Jeffrey Clifford producing, Jeremy Slater and Jane Goldman writing and Nikolaj Arcel directing. Since then, there has been no further announcements.

==== Fables video game ====
In 2011, Telltale Games announced The Wolf Among Us, an episodic graphic adventure game based upon Fables. With the first of its five episodes released on October 11, 2013 (and the final episode released on July 8, 2014), the game is canon with the comic book universe and is set as a prequel to the comic book. The second season of The Wolf Among Us was in production, and was planned to be released sometime in 2018, but the game was delayed and rescheduled for release in 2019 before ultimately being cancelled in September 2018 following the studio's closure.

=== The Books of Magic film ===
A film version of The Books of Magic has been in development hell for many years. It was originally optioned by Warner Bros. for some years before the first Harry Potter book was published, with Neil Gaiman signing on as executive producer in 1998. After several years of drafting and redrafting, the script moved so far from the original concept that Gaiman and Paul Levitz advised the filmmakers that any audience seeing it expecting a film based on the comic would be disappointed, and decided to develop the film themselves. They worked with screenwriter Matt Greenberg, who had written early drafts of the original script, to come up with something closer to the original story, but nothing came from this.

=== Astro City ===
==== Astro City film ====
In 2003, Ben Barenholtz, Jonathan Alpers and Kurt Busiek hoped to develop an Astro City film, with Barenholtz as producer and Alpers as lead scripter, but the plans did not take off, whereupon Barenholtz subsequently took the project to Working Title Films. In July 2010, Working Title acquired the rights to make a live-action feature film adaptation of Astro City. Busiek was to write a script treatment, and also to executive-produce, along with Barenholtz and Alpers. Kurt Busiek later reveleed in May 2013 that Working Title's option had lapsed but he was in negotiation with another party.

==== Astro City TV series ====
In March 2018, FremantleMedia North America announced a live-action Astro City TV series with a pilot episode written by Busiek and Rick Alexander. There have been no developments since.

=== The American Way film ===
In 2018, John Ridley was working with Blumhouse Productions to adapt his comic into a film and direct. There has been no further development since.

=== Codename: Knockout film ===
In 2001, Codename: Knockout artist Louis Small, Jr. reported that Warner Bros. had picked up the option to adapt the comic series into a film and commissioned a script, but nothing came out of this.

=== Y: The Last Man film ===
The film rights to the Y: The Last Man series were acquired by New Line Cinema (a sister company to Vertigo), and in July 2007, screenwriter Carl Ellsworth and director D. J. Caruso were attached to the project with David S. Goyer as a producer. Caruso intended on finishing the script in the summer and filming during the fall of 2008. The script would be a rewrite of the original draft written by Jeff Vintar. Although Vintar's draft was faithful to the original comic book and considered by many to be a success, the higher-ups at New Line Cinema seemed unable to fully embrace the material. A subsequent draft by Vaughan himself, which departed from his own comic considerably, was even less successful in convincing the studio to proceed.

Caruso maintained that the source material was too much to be told in one film, and his team decided to concentrate on the best first film they could, which would end somewhere around issue #14 of the comic series. The entire comic series as a whole would be plotted into three films. Actor Shia LaBeouf, who has worked with these writers for the films Disturbia and Eagle Eye, has previously stated that he was unwilling to play the role of Yorick. According to LaBeouf, the role is far too similar to the character Sam Witwicky, which he portrays in the Transformers series, but expressed a chance to star. Caruso planned to use a real monkey, and not a CGI construct, to play Ampersand. Caruso also wanted Alicia Keys for the part of Agent 355. Zachary Levi, who played the lead in the TV series Chuck, has expressed interest in playing Yorick as he is a fan of the comic book series, even going as far as having his character Chuck Bartowski read the Y: The Last Man graphic novel in the episode "Chuck Versus the Nacho Sampler".

Caruso remained "loosely attached" to the project, but New Line refused to acquiesce on its development as a stand-alone film as opposed to the trilogy Caruso (who has since moved on to direct the science fiction film I Am Number Four) preferred. Caruso commented: "I didn't think that you could take Yorick's story and put it in to a two-hour movie and do it justice... I just feel like it's too much for one screenplay". He ultimately walked away from the project.

In March 2012, former Jericho writers Matthew Federman and Stephen Scaia entered final negotiations to write New Line's adaptation of the series, following in the footsteps of Vintar, Vaughan, and Ellsworth. J.C. Spink, Chris Bender, and David Goyer were attached to produce; Mason Novick and Jake Weiner were executive producers. Reports in September suggested New Line was enthusiastic about the draft screenplay produced by Federman and Scaia, and had begun the process of meeting potential directors to hire for the project.

Dan Trachtenberg was attached to direct the film in early 2013. In June, producer David Goyer revealed a script and suggested the film could go into production in 2014. However, in January 2014, Brian K. Vaughan said: "It's my understanding that the rights to Y: The Last Man will revert to co-creator Pia Guerra and me for the first time in a decade if the planned New Line adaptation doesn't start shooting in the next few months". Trachtenberg later tweeted that the film was not happening. In a subsequent interview he noted that in fact "the rights reverted to Brian quite a few months ago".

A television series called "Y" starring Ben Schnetzer as Yorick Brown, Diane Lane as Yorick Brown's mother, Senator Jennifer Brown, Olivia Thirlby as Yorick's sister Hero Brown, and Ashley Romans as Agent 355 premiered on FX in 2020.

=== Deathbed TV series ===
In January 2021, TNT was set to develop a television series adaptation of Joshua Williamson and Riley Rossmo's Vertigo Comics limited series Deathbed, with Neil Reynolds writing the series and Julie Plec to executive produce via My So-Called Company along with Warner Bros. Television. There have been no further announcements since.

=== We3 film ===
In June 2005, New Line Cinema optioned We3, and the comic's writer, Grant Morrison, was in negotiations to write the screenplay. John Stevenson, director of Kung Fu Panda, was attached to the project as a director in December 2008, and New Line Cinema was no longer involved. As of November 2010, the status of the film is that Morrison has written the script, but the project appears to have stalled, partially due to concerns over the level of violence. Morrison said in an interview that "Relativity Pictures keeps saying they're doing it, and they still haven't done it", and that they cannot say anything more as it stands.

=== FBP: Federal Bureau of Physics film ===
By April 2014, the production of a film adaptation of Vertigo's FBP: Federal Bureau of Physics was in the works. Justin Marks and David Goyer were to reunite for the production of the film, with Nellie Reed producing. Since then, there has been no more announcements.

=== Early attempt of DMZ TV series ===
By February 2014, Syfy was planning on making a TV series adaptation of the DMZ comics with former Mad Men writers and executive producers Andre and Maria Jacquemetton. Executive producer for the pilot is David Heyman, who previously worked on Harry Potter, Gravity and was working on the film adaptation of the Vertigo comic series Fables. In 2019, HBO Max acquired the rights for the series, with Ava DuVernay directing the pilot and Roberto Patino as writer and showrunner. The show premiered in March 2022.

=== Amped/Jacked TV series ===
In April 2015, Supernatural creator Eric Kripke was writing the comic book series called Amped (later retitled Jacked) for DC and Vertigo to be released in fall 2015. At the same time, USA Network was developing a TV adaptation of the comic book series. Kripke was to serve as both writer and executive producer of the show, co-produced by Kripke Enterprises and Warner Horizon Television. No production news has followed since.

=== The Exterminators TV series ===
In July 2008, Showtime announced to develop the Vertigo series The Exterminators as a one-hour drama. The comic was created by writer Simon Oliver and artist Tony Moore. Executive producer Sara Colleton's credits include the Showtime hit drama Dexter. However, in February 2011, Oliver revealed in an interview that the project is currently in limbo.

=== Scalped TV series ===
In 2014, WGN America was developing a live action TV show based on the Vertigo comic book series Scalped. The pilot order was given in March 2016. In February 2017, Bilall Fallah and Adil El Arbi began directing the pilot, but in November, after WGN saw the pilot episode, they decided to abandon the series.

=== 100 Bullets ===
==== 100 Bullets TV series ====
In 2011, David S. Goyer, co-writer of Dark City and The Dark Knight, was attached to executive produce and write a TV series based on 100 Bullets for Showtime. Goyer revealed in June 2013 that the project got "incredibly close" at Showtime before being turned down due to a multitude of mass shootings across the United States. He called the sudden turn of events "frustrating".

==== 100 Bullets film ====
The Wall Street Journal reported information regarding upcoming Warner Brothers films based on DC Comics properties during 2014. The films that were revealed to be in development included the much anticipated Justice League film; Shazam!, Fables, and 100 Bullets were among the other films listed, and are currently in varying stages of production. A film adaptation was revealed to be in development, produced by Tom Hardy with the option for him to star in the film. It was to be written by Chris Borrelli and distributed by New Line Cinema.

=== The Sandman film ===
Throughout the late 1990s, a film adaptation of The Sandman was periodically planned by Warner Bros., parent company of DC Comics. Roger Avary was originally attached to direct after the success of Pulp Fiction, collaborating with Pirates of the Caribbean screenwriters Ted Elliott and Terry Rossio in 1996 on a revision of their first script draft, which merged the "Preludes and Nocturnes" storyline with that of "The Doll's House". Avary intended the film to be, in part, visually inspired by animator Jan Švankmajer's work. Avary was fired after disagreements over the creative direction with executive producer Jon Peters, best known for Batman and Superman Lives. It was due to their meeting on the Sandman film project that Avary and Gaiman collaborated one year later on the script for Beowulf. The project carried on through several more writers and scripts. A later draft by William Farmer, reviewed at Ain't It Cool News, was met with scorn from fans. Gaiman called the last screenplay that Warner Bros. would send him "not only the worst Sandman script I've ever seen, but quite easily the worst script I've ever read". Gaiman has said that his dissatisfaction with how his characters were being treated had dissuaded him from writing any more stories involving the Endless, although he has since written Endless Nights.

By 2001, the project had become stranded in development hell. In a Q&A panel at Comic-Con 2007, Gaiman remarked: "I'd rather see no Sandman movie made than a bad Sandman movie. But I feel like the time for a Sandman movie is coming soon. We need someone who has the same obsession with the source material as Peter Jackson had with Lord of the Rings or Sam Raimi had with Spider-Man". That same year, he stated that he could imagine Terry Gilliam as a director for the adaptation. In 2013, DC President Diane Nelson said that a Sandman film would be as rich as the Harry Potter universe. David S. Goyer said in an interview in early December that he would be producing an adaptation of the graphic novel, alongside Joseph Gordon-Levitt and Neil Gaiman. Jack Thorne was hired to write the script. In October 2014, Gaiman clarified that while the film was not announced with the DC slate by Warner Bros., it would instead be distributed by Vertigo, with other films on the slate. Goyer told Deadline Hollywood in an interview that the studio was very happy with the film's script. According to Deadline.com, the film was to be distributed by New Line Cinema. In October 2015, Goyer revealed that a new screenwriter was being brought on board to revise the script by Jack Thorne and stated that he believed the film would go into production the following year. Eric Heisserer was hired to rewrite the film's script in March 2016. Soon after, Gordon-Levitt dropped out due to disagreements with the studio over the creative direction of the film. Heisserer had turned in his draft of the script but left the film in November, instead to be developed as an HBO series.

=== HBO's Preacher TV series ===
HBO announced in November 2006 adapting Preacher as a one-hour television series, with a pilot episode written by Mark Steven Johnson and directed by Howard Deutch. The project was canceled, when in August 2008 series executive producer Mark Steven Johnson said that the Preacher project was "dead at HBO". AMC later bought the rights for a TV adaptation developed by Sam Catlin, Evan Goldberg, Seth Rogen and Neal H. Moritz.

=== Transmetropolitan film ===
Co-creators Warren Ellis and Darick Robertson were approached about making a Transmetropolitan film adaptation, with Patrick Stewart's production company Flying Freehold Productions offering to option the rights in February 2003. Later, the burgeoning Internet boom led to an offer to create an online animated film series, with Stewart providing the voice of Spider Jerusalem, but the project never fully developed. Ellis and Robertson have been rumored to have indicated that they would like to see Tim Roth play Jerusalem, but during a panel at London's Kapow! comic convention Ellis said that there is no chance of seeing Spider Jerusalem on the big screen and Tim Roth was not discussed to play him, and explained that production costs would be too high to bring Transmetropolitan to the big screen. In 2010, Ellis noted in his Twitter account that production discussions have ceased.

=== Death: The High Cost of Living film ===
Since the late 1990s, a film based on Death: The High Cost of Living, to be called Death and Me, was under production at New Line Cinema. Neil Gaiman wrote the screenplay and was also attached to direct, with Guillermo del Toro as executive producer. Gaiman spent several days on the set of del Toro's film Hellboy II: The Golden Army to get pointers on how to direct. Other than two additional scenes at the beginning (set in a Tibetan monastery and Alaska), and a move from New York City to London for the main setting, the screenplay was relatively unchanged from the comic script. After being in development hell for several years, work on it was renewed in 2007, but quickly derailed again due to the WGA strikes. According to Gaiman, the studio "may still be New Line, but Warner Independent is keen on it too". Shia LaBeouf may have had a role in the film, possibly as the lead character Sexton, due to his help in trying to get the film developed. Gaiman later said in October 2010 that DC and Warner Bros. closed down work on the film and it was unclear if they would start it up again.

=== Channel 4's V for Vendetta TV series ===
In October 2017, Channel 4 was developing a television series based on V for Vendetta. Since then, there has been no further announcements, until a television adaptation was set up at HBO instead with Pete Jackson writing the series with James Gunn, Peter Safran, Ben Stephenson executive producing and Leanne Klein producing the series.

=== Unfollow TV series ===
By November 2015, ABC was developing a television project based on the Unfollow comic series from The Originals showrunner Michael Narducci. Since then, there has been no further announcements.

=== Survivors Club TV series ===
In November 2018, The CW was developing a television project based on the Survivors Club comic series from Sweet/Vicious writer Jared Frieder and Hart of Dixie producer Len Goldstein. Since then, there has been no further announcements.

=== Ex Machina film ===
In July 2005, New Line Cinema picked up the rights to make a film based on the Ex Machina comic book series. The project was in limbo until January 2020, when Oscar Isaac was approached to produce and star as Hundred in a film adaptation. The film is set to be retitled The Great Machine in order to avoid confusion with the film Ex Machina and Isaac's previous involvement in said film.

=== League of Extraordinary Gentlemen ===
==== League of Extraordinary Gentlemen reboot ====
In 2015, 20th Century Fox and Davis Entertainment agreed to develop a reboot with hopes of launching a franchise. John Davis revealed that the reboot will be a female-centric film. As of May 2022, the film is on track by 20th Century Studios, scheduled to stream on Hulu, with Justin Haythe writing and Don Murphy, who produced the 2003 film, will return as a producer alongside Susan Montford and Erwin Stoff of 3 Arts Entertainment.

==== League of Extraordinary Gentlemen TV series ====
In 2013, Fox was ordering a pilot for the television version of LoEG with Michael Green serving as writer and executive producer. Showrunner Erwin Stoff was attached to executive produce. Neither Moore nor O'Neill was involved in the series. It had also been reported that the pilot episode would still be broadcast, even if Fox opted not to green-light the series.

=== RED ===
==== RED 3 ====
In May 2013, Lionsgate re-signed Jon and Erich Hoeber to write a third film to the RED series. Since then, there has been no further announcements.

==== RED TV series ====
NBC was developing a RED TV series with the Hoeber brothers, Lorenzo di Bonaventura and Mark Vahradian. There have been no new production announcements since.

=== Global Frequency TV series ===
Mark Burnett prepared a Global Frequency television series for 2005 with Michelle Forbes as Miranda Zero, Josh Hopkins as Sean Flynn, Jenni Baird as Dr. Katrina Finch and Aimee Garcia as Aleph. The characters of Sean Flynn, an ex-policeman who accidentally stumbled on a Global Frequency mission, and Katrina Finch, a brilliant scientist with expertise in multiple fields, were created especially for the series. Unlike the comic book, which had an ever-changing cast of field agents, Flynn and Finch were to be regulars along with Zero and Aleph, with other Frequency members coming in as and when necessary in supporting roles. This would allow for the character continuity expected of a television series, and yet allow other characters to be killed off, as in the comic book. A pilot episode, based heavily on the first issue of the comic book, was produced, but The WB (the original intended network) did not commission the series. John Rogers was the principal creative force behind the television incarnation, writing the pilot episode, with Ellis credited as producer and creator. Other writers waiting to come on board included David Slack, Ben Edlund, and Diego Gutierrez. The pilot was directed by Nelson McCormick. The unaired pilot was leaked onto the Internet in June 2005 and continues to be downloaded and shared, primarily via BitTorrent and other P2P networks. Although it was popular and critically acclaimed, according to Ellis himself, the leaking of the pilot annoyed Warner Brothers to the extent that they killed the project. In November 2009, a new television adaptation of Global Frequency was being worked on by The CW Television Network and writer Scott Nimerfro. In Autumn 2014, Fox was producing a new Global Frequency pilot, produced by Jerry Bruckheimer and written by Rockne S. O'Bannon, but Fox later decided not to order the pilot for Global Frequency due to problems with the script.

=== Battle Chasers film ===
In March 2003, Twentieth Century Fox has optioned feature rights to Battle Chasers with Gil Netter attached as a producer. There has been no further news since.

=== The Boys film ===
In February 2008, Columbia Pictures optioned the comic for a film adaptation, to be produced by Neal H. Moritz, and Phil Hay and Matt Manfredi writing the screenplay. In August 2010, Adam McKay said that he had been signed on to direct the film: "They already have a script and we're doing a rewrite on it so hopefully getting the whole thing into shape in the Fall with maybe a shoot happening in January". Columbia Pictures later dropped its option regarding a film adaptation of The Boys in February 2012. Paramount Pictures soon picked it up, and the film was still in the works. Manfredi and Hay were hired by Paramount to write the film, though the project never came to fruition. Years later, Amazon Prime bought the rights for a TV adaptation developed by Eric Kripke, Evan Goldberg, and Seth Rogen. It premiered in July 2019.

=== Darkchylde film ===
In August 2007, Randy Queen, creator of the comic book character Darkchylde, revealed to Newsarama that a movie is in the works. In an interview with Nicholas Yanes from scifipulse.net, Queen was asked and responded to a question about a film/television adaptation of Darkchylde: "Yanes: For years now, there have been rumors of Darkchylde being turned into an animated series, miniseries for a cable network, and movie. Are you able to comment on Darkchylde's potential future in television and film? Any actresses you'd love to play Ariel? Queen: A movie makes so much sense it's ridiculous, and all I can say is that we are working on it. I know that's a frustrating answer for fans, but it's a frustrating process. It's probably best for me not to comment on actresses, so we'll just all have to wait and see". Test footage from the set of Darkchylde emerged in July 2010 and on October 31, John Carpenter was announced to direct. Since then, there have not been any further announcements, falling into development hell.

=== Sleeper film ===
In August 2008, Tom Cruise and Sam Raimi were in the process of creating a movie adaptation of Sleeper with Warner Bros., in which Cruise may have starred and Brad Inglesby writing the screenplay, but this rumor went cold. In November 2013, the magazine Variety reported that Matt Damon, Ben Affleck, and Jennifer Todd would produce the film, and Shawn Ryan and David Wiener would pen the film. Since then, there have not been any further announcements, falling into development hell.

=== Ocean film ===
In 2007, the comic had been optioned by Gianni Nunnari and Nick Wechsler, who have history with films based on comics, the former produced 300 and the duo were slated to produce the film based on Ronin. Ryan Condal, writer of the spec script Galahad, had been approached by Warner Brothers to produce a screenplay for them. Since then, there has been no further announcements.

=== Mad animated series attempts ===
A 1974 Mad animated television pilot using selected material from the magazine was commissioned by ABC, but the network decided not broadcast it. Dick DeBartolo noted: "Nobody wanted to sponsor a show that made fun of products that were advertised on TV, like car manufacturers". The program was instead created into a TV special, and is available for online viewing.

In the mid-1980s, Hanna-Barbera developed another potential Mad animated television series that was never broadcast.

=== Road to Purgatory ===
In 2008, Max Allan Collins was attached to write and direct a sequel to Road to Perdition, which would adapt his comic series Road to Purgatory. In 2011, Collins reported that the sequel had not yet received funding or official green light.

== See also ==
- List of unproduced film projects based on Marvel Comics
  - List of unproduced television projects based on Marvel Comics
  - List of unproduced films based on Marvel Comics imprints publications
- List of unproduced Dark Horse Comics projects
- List of unproduced Image Comics projects
- List of films based on DC Comics publications
  - DC Extended Universe
  - DC Animated Movie Universe
  - List of unproduced DC Comics projects
- List of television series based on DC Comics publications
  - Arrowverse
  - DC Animated Universe
- List of films based on comics
- List of films based on English-language comics
- List of American superhero films
- List of comic-based films directed by women
