= Flutter (comics) =

- Volume 1 cover

Publication information
- Publisher: Dark Horse Comics
- Publication date: March 2013

Creative team
- Created by: Jennie Wood

Flutter is a comic series published by Dark Horse Comics. The first graphic novel in the series, Flutter, Volume One: Hell Can Wait, was published in March 2013. The Advocate named it one of the best LGBTQ graphic novels of 2013. The following year, Bleeding Cool named Flutter one of the 15 best indie comics.

== Creation of Flutter ==
Flutter is the story of a teenage girl who shape-shifts into a boy to get her dream girl because her dream girl is straight. Series creator Jennie Wood (they/them) said in a 2015 interview with The New York Times that the story came from their imagining that life would be better as a guy. In a 2013 interview with Mic, Wood said the story was based on their own experiences growing up in a small southern town. They worked in a movie theater while in high school where they would watch guys bring girls to the movies. Wishing they could bring a girl to the movies, Wood began daydreaming about what it would be like to be a boy. Those daydreams led to Flutter.

In 2008, series creator Jennie Wood began developing Flutter. By 2010, they were working with artist Jeff McComsey. Together, the duo self-published the first issue in 2011. Soon after, 215 Ink offered to publish the comics as a full color graphic novel series. 215 Ink published Flutter, Volume One: Hell Can Wait in March 2013.

Two years later, on September 25, 2015, Flutter, Volume Two: Don't Let Me Die Nervous was published. Written by Wood with art by McComsey, Volume Two also included work by Chris Goodwin (colors) and Jeff McClelland (lettering). Flutter, Volume Two was named a 2015 INDIEFAB Book of the Year finalist and a Virginia Library Association Diversity Honor Book. The series has also been featured in the Boston Globe.

The third and final volume of the series, Flutter, Volume Three: Rid of Me, was published on October 21, 2017. In March 2018, Flutter, Volume Three became a 2017 Foreword INDIES finalist for graphic novels and comics.

Also in March 2018, Dark Horse Comics announced that they would publish The Flutter Collection. The collection combined all three previous graphic novels into one volume and was released in October 2018. The collection received the Next Generation Indie Book award for Best Graphic Novel of 2018.

== Television adaptation ==
In July 2017, Dark Horse Entertainment and Universal Cable Productions announced that Flutter had been optioned for television series. The comic series would be adapted for television by Katherine Lindberg and Sense8 producer Marc Rosen.
