= Eric Paul Shaffer =

American novelist and poet

Eric Paul Shaffer is an American novelist and poet, who lives and works in Hawai‘i. A retired professor of English at Honolulu Community College, he formerly taught at Maui Community College and the University of the Ryukyus on Okinawa.

== Early life ==
Shaffer is a graduate of the University of California, Davis, where he received a Ph.D. in American Literature in 1991. Shaffer's dissertation was the first critical examination of the life and work of Lew Welch, a member of the San Francisco Renaissance and friend to Gary Snyder, Jack Kerouac, Philip Whalen, Allen Ginsberg, Richard Brautigan, and Albert Saijo.

== Career ==
His work has appeared in more than 650 national and international reviews, journals, and magazines, including Bamboo Ridge, the Chaminade Literary Review, the Chicago Review, the Chiron Review, Slate, The Sun Magazine, and the North American Review, as well as in the anthologies 100 Poets Against the War, The EcoPoetry Anthology, Jack London Is Dead: Contemporary Euro-American Poetry of Hawai‘i (And Some Stories), Crossing Lines, In the Trenches, Weatherings, and The Soul Unearthed. He is the author of ten collections of poetry and one novel.

== Awards ==
Shaffer received the Elliot Cades Award for Literature, Hawaii's highest literary honor, in 2002, and the James Vaughan Award for Poetry in 2010. He was a visiting poetry faculty member at the 23rd annual Jackson Hole Writers Conference. His poetry collection Lāhaina Noon received an Award for Excellence in the 2006 Ka Palapala Po'okela Book Awards. His poetry collection Even Further West received an Honorable Mention in the 2019 Ka Palapala Po'okela Book Awards.

== Bibliography ==
- Kindling: Poems from Two Poets (Golden, CO: Longhand Press, 1988) (with James Taylor III)
- RattleSnake Rider (Black Hawk, CO: Longhand Press, 1990)
- How I Read Gertrude Stein by Lew Welch, edited and with an introduction by Eric Paul Shaffer (San Francisco: Grey Fox Press, 1996)
- Portable Planet: Poems (Chantilly, Virginia: Leaping Dog Press, 2000)
- Living at the Monastery, Working in the Kitchen (Chantilly, Virginia: Leaping Dog Press, 2001)
- Lāhaina Noon: Nā Mele O Maui (San José, California: Leaping Dog Press, 2005)
- Burn & Learn: Memoirs of the Cenozoic Era: A Novel (Raleigh, North Carolina: Leaping Dog Press, 2009)
- A Million-Dollar Bill (West Hartford, Connecticut: 2016. 2nd edition, Albuquerque, New Mexico: Coyote Arts, 2024)
- Even Further West (Portland, Oregon: Unsolicited Press, 2018)
- Green Leaves: Selected & New Poems (Albuquerque, New Mexico: Coyote Arts, 2023)
- Free Speech: poem sequences (Albuquerque, New Mexico: Coyote Arts, 2025)
- Second Nature: Poems (Albuquerque, New Mexico: Coyote Arts, 2026)
