= Wow-and-flutter =

Wow and flutter may refer to:

- Wow (recording) and flutter (electronics and communication), irregularities in the playback speed of analogue recordings
  - Wow and flutter measurement
- Wow and Flutter, a 1994 EP by Stereolab
- Wow & Flutter, an indie rock band from Portland, Oregon
- Wow and Flutter, a solo album by Wouter Van Belle
