= Controlled aerodynamic instability phenomena =

The term controlled aerodynamic instability phenomena was first used by Cristiano Augusto Trein in the Nineteenth KKCNN Symposium on Civil Engineering held in Kyoto, Japan, in 2006. The concept is based on the idea that aerodynamic instability phenomena, such as Kármán vortex street, flutter, galloping and buffeting, can be driven into a controlled motion and be used to extract energy from the flow, becoming an alternative approach for wind power generation systems.

== Justification ==
Nowadays, when a discussion is established around the theme wind power generation, what is promptly addressed is the image of a big wind turbine getting turned by the wind. However, some alternative approaches have already been proposed in the latter decades, showing that wind turbines are not the only possibility for the exploitation of the wind for power generation purposes.

In 1977 Jeffery experimented with an oscillating aerofoil system based on a vertically mounted pivoting wing which flapped in the wind. Farthing discovered that this free flutter could automatically cease for high wind protection and developed floating and pile based models for pumping surface and well water as well as compressing air with auxiliary battery charging. McKinney and DeLaurier in 1981 proposed a system called wingmill, based on a rigid horizontal airfoil with articulated pitching and plunging to extract energy from the flow. This system has stimulated Moores in 2003 to conduct further investigations on applications of such idea.

Following the same trend, other studies have already been carried out, for example the flutter power generation system proposed by Isogai et al. in 2003, which uses the flutter instability caused by the wind on an aerofoil to extract energy from the flow. In this branch, Matsumoto et al. went further, proposing enhancements for that system and assessing the feasibility of its usage with bluff bodies. The "kite motors" of Dave Santos utilize aerofoil instabilities.

== Controlled aerodynamic instability phenomena ==
The wind interacts with the obstacles it reaches in its way by transferring a part of its energy to those interactions, which are converted into forces over the bodies, leading them to different levels of motion, which are directly dependent on their aeroelastic and geometric characteristics. A large number of studies and research has been conducted concerning these interactions and their dependencies, aiming the understanding of the aerodynamic phenomena that arise due to them, such as the Kármán vortex street, galloping, buffeting and flutter, mainly regarding bluff bodies. By the understanding of such phenomena it is possible to predict instabilities and their consequent motions, feeding the designers with the data they need in order to arrange the structures properly.

In the great majority of the cases – e.g.: in civil buildings – such motions are useless and undesirable, in a manner that all the designing approaches are focused on avoiding them. However these instabilities may also be used in a profitable manner: if they are controlled and driven to a predictable motion, they can provide mechanical power supply to run, for example, turbines, machinery and electricity generators.

So, by using the knowledge acquired by now regarding those aerodynamic instabilities and by developing new features, it is possible to propose ways to stimulate them to an optimal state, using them for power generation purposes. That way, alternative approaches to the windmill may be proposed and developed. Farthing Econologica applies the practical requirements for a windmill to greatly whittle down the possibilities.
