= Olivia Vieweg =

German illustrator and comics artist

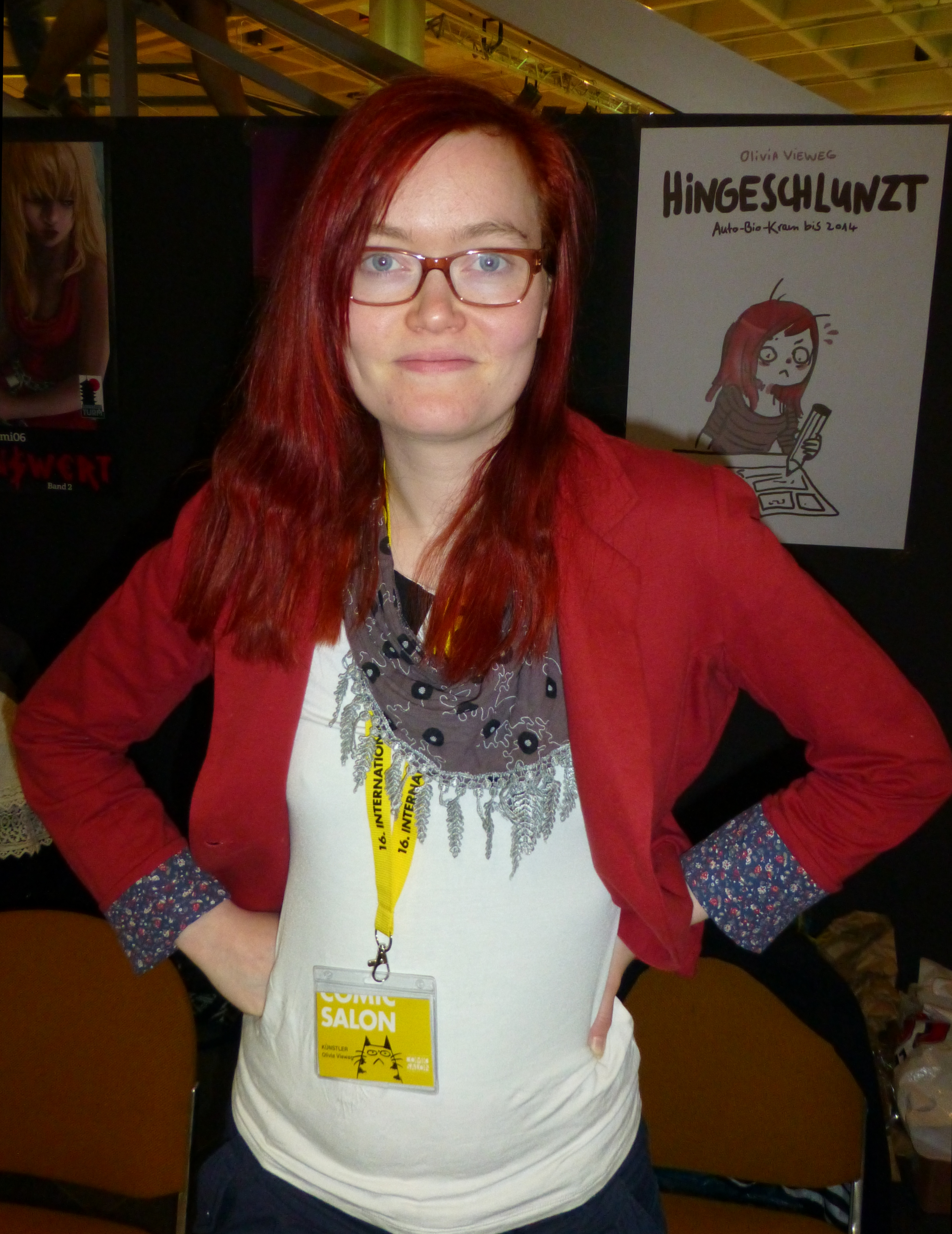
- Vieweg in 2014
- Born: 3 October 1987 (age 39) Jena, Bezirk Gera, East Germany

Olivia Vieweg (German pronunciation: [ˈfiːˌveːk]; born 3 October 1987 in Jena) is a German cartoonist and author, as well as an editor of comic anthologies. She created the comic novels Huck Finn and Antoinette returns.

== Biography ==
Vieweg spent the first ten years of her life in a Plattenbau on Bundesautobahn 4. Her first point of contact with the medium of comics is uncertain, but she herself states it may have been the German Donald Duck „Lustiges Taschenbuch“ series. More influential for her was Sailor Moon. Her first shorter comic books were written in the manga- influenced so-called "Germangaka" style. As a student in Jena she was already designing posters for the Jenaer Philharmonie. One of her trademark themes, drawing cats, developed during her time studying Visual Communication at the Bauhaus University, Weimar, and these were published in a series of cartoons by Carlsen Verlag. In 2010 she had her first exhibition, together with Katja Klengel, in the City Museum Gera. In 2011 she graduated from the Bauhaus University with the zombie comic Endzeit., subsequently made into a film which has toured arthouse cinemas worldwide.

Vieweg lives in Weimar. She has worked as an illustrator of the children's book series Vampirinternat Schloss Schauerfels and colorist of the comic series Zilverpijl. She also works in advertising. In December 2012, she gave birth to a son. In July 2014, she took over the alternating role of comic strip author in the Sunday Supplement of Der Tagesspiegel. She has a penchant for Persian cats.

== Awards ==
- Tankred Dorst Preis 2015 for the screenplay for "ENDZEIT"
- Comic grant from the Ehapa Comic Collection of the Egmont Ehapa Publishing House 2012
- ICOM Independent Comic Award 2010

== Bibliography ==
Comics

- Endzeit (in German), Weimar: Schwarzer Turm, 2012, ISBN 978-3-934167-61-2
- Huck Finn (in German), Berlin: Suhrkamp, 2013, ISBN 978-3-518-46429-8
  - Spanische Ausgabe: Olivia Vieweg (2014), Huck Finn: basado en "Las aventuras de Huckleberry Finn" de Mark Twain; [la novela gráfica] [Huck Finn] (in German), Belén Santana López (trans.), Madrid: Impedimenta, ISBN 978-84-15979-26-5
- Antoinette kehrt zurück (in German), Köln: Egmont Graphic Novel, 2014, ISBN 978-3-7704-5500-3
- Hingeschlunzt (in German), Weimar: Schwarzer Turm, 2014, ISBN 978-3-934167-70-4
- Schwere See, mein Herz (in German), Berlin: Suhrkamp, 2015, ISBN 978-3-518-46599-8
- Die Unheimlichen: Antigone (in German), Hamburg: Carlsen, 2019, ISBN 978-3-551-71352-0

Cartoons

- Warum Katzen besser sind als Männer (in German), Hamburg: Carlsen, 2009, ISBN 978-3-551-68464-6
- Warum Katzen die glücklicheren Menschen sind (in German), Hamburg: Carlsen, 2010, ISBN 978-3-551-68465-3
- Warum Katzen keine Diäten machen (in German), Hamburg: Carlsen, 2011, ISBN 978-3-551-68255-0

Anthology contributions

- "Lowschool", Manga Spot 2006 (in German), München: Animexx, pp. 49–67, 2006
- "Gevatter Tot", Es war keinmal, Turm-Manga spezial (in German), vol. Band 1, Hünfeld: Schwarzer Turm, 2006, ISBN 978-3-934167-30-8
- "Alle Wege führen nach Rom", Paper Theatre (in German), Weimar: Schwarzer Turm, 2006, pp. 51–72, ISBN 3-934167-29-2
- "Die Flut", Manga-Mixx (in German), no. 3, München: Animexx, pp. 70–88, 2007, 1047275058, frei nach "Herr Keuner und die Flut" von Bertolt Brecht
- "Prinzessin auf der Erbse", Subway to Sally Storybook (in German), vol. Band 1, Köln: Egmont Manga & Anime, 2008, pp. 181–188, ISBN 978-3-7704-6938-3
- "Morgen bin ich weg", Paper Theatre (in German), Weimar: Schwarzer Turm, 2009, pp. 167–183, ISBN 978-3-934167-29-2
- "Kein Plan!", Comix & Beer. 100 Ganz Legale Comicrightverletzungen (in German), Leipzig: Comicstammtisch Leipzig, p. 21, 2009
- "Das schwarze Meer", Subway to Sally Storybook (in German), vol. Band 2, Weimar: Schwarzer Turm, 2012, pp. 107–116, ISBN 978-3-934167-58-2

As editor

- (mit Vicky Danko und Beatrice Beckmann): Paper Theatre Band 6 und 7
- Subway to Sally Storybook 1 und 2
- Blütenträume 2, Turm-Manga spezial (in German), vol. Band 7, Weimar: Schwarzer Turm, 2009, ISBN 978-3-934167-45-2
- Blütenträume 3, Turm-Manga spezial (in German), vol. Band 9, Weimar: Schwarzer Turm, 2010, ISBN 978-3-934167-49-0
