= List of Tantei Opera Milky Holmes episodes =

Tantei Opera Milky Holmes is a Japanese anime series produced by J.C. Staff, based on the media franchise created by Bushiroad. In a world where detectives and thieves battle against each other using supernatural abilities known as Toys, the story follows Sherlock Shellingford, Nero Yuzurizaki, Hercule Barton and Cordelia Glauca, a group of young detectives who suddenly lose their Toys and have to earn them back to avoid expulsion from Holmes Detective Academy. The first series aired in Japan on Tokyo MX between October 7, 2010, and December 23, 2010, and was also streamed on Crunchyroll. This was followed by a Summer Special episode which aired on August 26, 2011. A second anime series, Tantei Opera Milky Holmes: Act 2, aired in Japan between January 5, 2012, and March 22, 2012. A second TV special aired on August 25, 2012. For the first season, the opening theme is "The Answer Is One! Not!!" (正解はひとつ!じゃない!!, Seikai wa Hitotsu! Janai!!) by Milky Holmes (Suzuko Mimori, Sora Tokui, Mikoi Sasaki and Izumi Kitta), whilst the ending theme is "Instinct Doubt" (本能のDOUBT, Honnou no DOUBT) by Faylan. The ending theme for the TV special is "Party Party!" (パーティーパーティー!, Pātī Pātī!) by Milky Holmes. For the second season, the opening theme is "Mystery! Mystery? Happiness!!" (ナゾ!ナゾ?Happiness!!, Nazo! Nazo? Happiness!!) by Milky Holmes whilst the ending theme is "Lovely Girls Anthem" by Natsuko Aso. The ending theme for the second TV special is "A Place For You And Me" (キミのなかのワタシ, Kimi no Naka no Watashi) by Milky Holmes with SV Tribe. A third season, Futari wa Milky Holmes, aired between July 13, 2013, and September 28, 2013, focusing on a pair of detectives named Alice and Kazumi who face up against a thief unit known as Color the Phantom. The opening theme is "Glory Glowing☆Days" (ぐろーりーぐろーいん☆DAYS, Gurōri Gurōin Deizu) by Milky Holmes whilst the ending theme is "Seishun Beginner!" (セイシュンビギナー!, Seishun Biginā!) by Ayasa Itō and Aimi Terakawa. With the exception of Alternative and Futari wa, each episode is named after a piece of famous detective fiction.

== Episode list ==
=== Tantei Opera Milky Holmes (2010) ===
No.	Title	Original release date
1	"Moving into the Attic"; Transliteration: "Yaneura no Nyūkyosha" (Japanese: 屋根裏の入居者)	October 7, 2010
During an encounter with a group of Gentlemen Thieves, the ace detective group Milky Holmes suddenly lose their Toys, which give them special abilities. A month later they have since descended to being the worst students at Sherlock Holmes' Detective Academy. The Gentlemen Thief leader, Arsene, masquerading as the Student Council President Henriette, moves Milky Holmes into a less luxurious lifestyle inside an attic and gives them three months to recover their toys before they are expelled.
2	"A Pocket Full of Bread"; Transliteration: "Poketto ni Pan o" (Japanese: ポケットにパンを)	October 14, 2010
As the Gentlemen Thieves continue their crime spree, Milky Holmes are having trouble adjusting to the poorer life. Cordelia Glauca tries to convince everyone to be friends, but inadvertently makes things worse. Everyone's mood soon livens up when Sherlock Shellingford finds a stray kitten, naming it Kamaboko. When Kamaboko starts pilfering bread from the cafeteria, Milky Holmes are accused of stealing it. Wanting to protect the kitten, Cordelia takes the blame. In order to save Cordelia from expulsion, Milky Holmes investigate the crime scene, finding the true culprit and the reason Cordelia protected him. Learning the truth, Henriette revokes the expulsion and allows them to keep the cat.
3	"Terror in the Coffin"; Transliteration: "Kanoke no Kyōfu" (Japanese: 棺桶の恐怖)	October 21, 2010
When Milky Holmes go to assist the guarding of a statue targeted by the Gentlemen Thieves, they are teased by the anti-Gentlemen-Thief force, G4, with false promises of getting their toys back. When Hercule "Elly" Barton fails the ridiculous ritual set by the G4 leader, Kokoro Akechi, Nero Yuzurizaki gets angry at her. When Arséne steals a fake statue, G4 try to follow them with a tracking device, but Milky Holmes accidentally breaks their computer when Cordelia gets scared. Still sad about earlier, Elly runs off so the others go look for her at the museum, where they run into the thieves who are trying to find the real statue. During the fight, Cordelia and Twenty get trapped in a sarcophagus, but the embarrassing noises temporarily gives Elly her toy back allowing her to get them out.
4	"The Secret of Baritsu"; Transliteration: "Baritsu no Himitsu" (Japanese: バリツの秘密)	October 28, 2010
Milky Holmes and G4 are informed about a girl named Irene Doala who went missing in the Yokohama woods. While searching for her, Sherlock and Kokoro become separated from their respective groups, winding up in a cave along with Irene. Irene explains she got lost while finding a treasure chest so she can stop her father's company from going bankrupt. When a bear attacks them on their journey back, Sherlock makes several failed attempts to rescue them only be coincidentally saved by an unexploded bomb. They are later found by G4 and returned home.
5	"A Case of the Missing Kamaboko"; Transliteration: "Kamaboko Shissō Jiken" (Japanese: かまぼこ失踪事件)	November 5, 2010
While trying to rescue Kamaboko from traffic, Elly is saved by two girls named Mary and Kate. They are revealed to be thieves, who attempt to kidnap Kamaboko, but are halted when Milky Holmes spot them and, mistaking them for detectives, invite them in. However, they soon manage to escape with Kamaboko, plotting to torture him due to his resemblance to their old boyfriend. As Milky Holmes search for him, Stoneriver, Twenty and Rat find Mary and Kate and fight against them for disturbing their territory, but are overpowered by their toys. Mary and Kate nearly take Kamaboko again, but change their mind when he saves them from one of Rat's bombs.
6	"The Princess's Substitute"; Transliteration: "Ōjo no Migawari" (Japanese: 王女の身代わり)	November 12, 2010
The Princess of Marlo, Claris, who bears a striking resemblance to Sherlock, doesn't want to marry a prince in order to support their country. Wanting to be a normal girl, she runs off and finds Sherlock and offers to trade lives with her for a day. While Claris hangs out with the rest of Milky Holmes, Sherlock spends the day with her prince-to-be, Pero, who is a masochist with a catgirl maid fetish. As Claris contemplates staying in this new life, her identity is discovered by Henriette, who tells her to stop running away from her troubles. Getting the help of Milky Holmes, Claris gets to the church before Sherlock gets wed to Pero, revealing she will reach her dreams with her own hands. Pero reveals he had been trying to get her to put off the marriage, as he was in love with her grandmother, who he marries, connecting the two countries after all.
7	"The Sun's Playful Play"; Transliteration: "Taiyō no Tawawamure" (Japanese: 太陽のたわわむれ)	November 19, 2010
Milky Holmes, along with Genius 4 visit a beach where it is rumored Baskerville hid his various treasures and researched a way to retrieve lost Toys. As the Gentlemen Thieves were also there planning to rob the place, Arséne joins them as Henriette. When it starts raining, they take shelter in a cave and decide to explore it, but get separated when they trigger some traps. After getting separated by a couple more traps, Sherlock and Nero learn what could possibly be the solution to regaining their Toys. However, they only end up finding a bunch of dolls in a vault which triggers another trap which fills the manor with cold water. With encouragement from Sherlock, Nero manages to get temporary control of her Toys, which heats up the water to hot spring temperature and reunites them with the others.
8	"Bouncy Girl"; Transliteration: "Boyoyon no Onna" (Japanese: ボヨヨンの女)	November 26, 2010
After being tricked by Kokoro with more false hopes of retrieving their Toys, Milky Holmes end up catching colds. Henriette spends the night nursing them back to help and ends up catching a cold herself. Milky Holmes decide to help nurse her back to health, and upon changing her clothes find her Arséne disguise, though they quickly pass it off as cosplay. Sherlock gives Henriette a rather dubious medicine that causes her Toys to go berserk, trapping everyone within a strange Momotaro-inspired illusion.
9	"MH's Tragedy"; Transliteration: "MH no Higeki" (Japanese: MHの悲劇)	December 3, 2010
One night, Nezu is attacked, leaving behind a 'dying message' supposedly saying 'M.H.', which leads Milky Holmes to become murder suspects, with Henriette giving them until the next morning to prove themselves innocent. When Milky Holmes seek wisdom from a Ouija board they found, a bright light shines and Cordelia, Nero and Elly are possessed by the spirits of their ancestors, Cordelia Gray, Nero Wolfe and Hercule Poirot, who were supposedly trapped within the Ouija board. However, their takes on their case aren't particularly helpful. Sherlock is then possessed by Sherlock Holmes, who identifies the culprit as Sherlock's kohai, Sonia. She attempts to escape but is stopped by Holmes and Rat, who had only been playing dead. The detectives soon take their leave, leaving behind a message for Milky Holmes saying their toys will return after a great trial, while Sonia is transferred to another academy.
10	"An Unsuitable Job for Milky Holmes"; Transliteration: "Mirukī Hōmuzu ni wa Mukanai Shokugyō" (Japanese: ミルキィホームズには向かない職業)	December 10, 2010
An exam is coming up, but Milky Holmes don't study for it since they assume their Toys will come back, resulting in complete failure. They then hear about a robbery by Arséne, assuming it is the trial Holmes mentioned, only to find Stone River, Twenty and Rat fighting amongst themselves. When the thieves turn their attention towards Milky Holmes, they are beaten easily due to their Toys not working, forcing Kokoro to rescue them from an explosion. Henriette becomes frustrated at Milky Holmes' lack of progress and sets fire to their attic, declaring them expelled from Holmes Academy.
11	"The Grand Yokohama Gorge of Fear"; Transliteration: "Kyōfu no Gurando Yokohama Kyōkoku" (Japanese: 恐怖のグランドヨコハマ峡谷)	December 17, 2010
As Milky Holmes go their separate ways, Henriette becomes furious with disappointment and goes on a crime spree as Arséne. G4 briefly visit Sherlock, working at a ramen shop, before heading off to face Arséne. As Sherlock visits the other girls, Henriette hosts a broadcast saying Arséne has kidnapped her, willingly putting herself into a trap over Yokohama Gorge which could send her to her death. When G4 are defeated by the Gentlemen Thieves, Sherlock gathers together Milky Holmes and are given a ride by Irene to the gorge. While the others hold the thieves back, Sherlock dives after Henriette as she falls, which activates her Toys, along with the others. However, Henriette than changes into Arséne, revealing a plan she has wanted to fight against Sherlock at her true potential.
12	"The Return of Milky Holmes"; Transliteration: "Mirukī Hōmuzu no Kikan" (Japanese: ミルキィホームズの帰還)	December 24, 2010
With their Toys returned, Milky Holmes battles against Arséne, who uses her illusion Toys at their full potential, producing tangible illusions, culminating in a battle in the outer atmosphere. However, after running into her cleavage, Sherlock realizes Arséne is actually Henriette, though they appear to forget this upon crashing back down to Earth. Arséne decides to retreat and 'return' Henriette. Milky Holmes are thanked for their rescue of Henriette, only to discover their Toys have also disappeared as a result of the impact. However, Henriette postpones their expulsion and refurbishes their attic room, where they soon introduced to a transfer student named Mori Arty.
Special	"Farewell, Kokoro-chan. Long Goodbye Forever and Ever..."; Transliteration: "Sayōnara, Kokoro-chan. Rongu Guddobai Fōebā yo Eien ni..." (Japanese: さようなら、小衣ちゃん。ロング・グッドバイ・フォーエバーよ永遠に…)	August 26, 2011
After some pushing by Irene and her father and a lack of support otherwise, Kokoro stubbornly quits her job as a police detective to become an idol. She soon finds the idol life draining and starts to miss her old detective life. When Henriette notices Sherlock's loneliness without her, she stages a statue theft in order to convince Kokoro to return to the force.

=== Tantei Opera Milky Holmes: Act 2 (2012) ===
No.	Title	Original release date
1 (13)	"Candidate for Veggies"; Transliteration: "Yasai no Hate" (Japanese: 野菜の果て)	December 31, 2011 (preview); January 5, 2012
Milky Holmes have been neglecting their roles as detectives to tend to a vegetable farm they have been working on, which irritates Henriette who wants them to work on regaining their Toys. Noticing Henriette's depression, the Gentlemen Thieves take it upon themselves to get revenge on Milky Holmes by wrecking their vegetable farm, though this ends up evoking a murderous rage within them. After Milky Holmes are reminded about their roles as detectives, the matter is settled following a few explosions and Henriette's order to destroy the farm.
2 (14)	"Nice Sushi"; Transliteration: "Naisu na Sushi" (Japanese: ナイスなすし)	January 12, 2012
As Milky Holmes laments the loss of their farm, Hercule notices their Toys have returned, with the others oblivious to the fact. Hercule is later given a strange painting from her part-time job, which piques the interest of a wealthy man as it reminds him of his long lost wife, offering a large sum which Nero accepts. However, a wind blows it away, leading to a rampant chase throughout town, with everyone besides Hercule oblivious of their use of Toys. The soon find the painting underneath a beached whale, which Hercule manages to lift off using her Toys, launching it into a pirate ship that held the man's long lost wife hostage. After eating some sushi, which Hercule forces Nero to use her money to pay for, the girls return home to learn from Henriette that the Holmes Detective Academy may be shutting down, the shock of which causes them to lose their Toys again. Hercule reminds the others of their duties as detectives and together they start thinking of a way to save the academy.
3 (15)	"The Strange Tales of Hakkei Island"; Transliteration: "Hakkei-jima Kidan" (Japanese: ハッケイ島綺譚)	January 19, 2012
Milky Holmes decide to go explore the Hakkei Prison Island to find a way to save the academy, but they are captured and imprisoned on arrival. Meanwhile, Henriette and the Gentlemen Thieves have also infiltrated the island in search of a legendary treasure. After hearing about the treasure from an old man, Henriette, along with Milky Holmes, stage a breakout, but end up falling into traps by the prison guard. However, they manage to find their way out and soon find the treasure is a single flower which, when removed, reduces the prison into a pile of sea cucumbers, only to later realise they had set a bunch of criminals into the city.
4 (16)	"The Slumbers of Milky Holmes"; Transliteration: "Mirukī Hōmuzu no Nezō" (Japanese: ミルキィホームズの寝相)	January 26, 2012
As Milky Holmes have trouble sleeping together, they unconcsciously activate their Toys to interfere with each other's dreams.
5 (17)	"Quiet Preparations"; Transliteration: "Kosokoso to Shitaku" (Japanese: コソコソと支度)	February 2, 2012
As reports come in of a flasher in the city, Milky Holmes encounters a girl named Coron from Osaka, who gets them to help her investigate the culprit. The girls come to suspect the Gentlemen Thieves and confront them with an odd method that ultimately fails, whilst Stone River comes at Hercule, suspecting her to be the flasher. Finding herself in a strange part of town, Hercule is targeted by a flasher but manages to knock her out, revealing her to be Coron, whose real name is Pō. Wanting to experience the freedom of being naked, the others decide to take her to a bathhouse, whilst G4 capture the true culprit.
6 (18)	"Weirdo on the Enoden Express"; Transliteration: "Enoden Kyūkō Henjin Jiken" (Japanese: エノ電急行変人事件)	February 9, 2012
As Milky Holmes encounter G4, who are searching on the Enoden Express train for a terrorist planning to bomb a statue, they decide to help look for the culprit after Kokoro is mysteriously knocked out. After a series of bizarre events, they discover the culprit is the conductor who is a fan of Kokoro and wanted to meet her. As the mystery behind Kokoro being knocked out is solved, Milky Holmes takes pride in their achievement until they accidentally blow up the statue themselves.
7 (19)	"And Then Hope Was None"; Transliteration: "Soshite Kibō Nakunatta" (Japanese: そして希望なくなった)	February 16, 2012
As Henriette's patience with Milky Holmes finally snaps, she leaks to the news that Arsene is planning to destroy Holmes Detective Agency. Later that night as everyone is gathered outside, Arsene appears, using her illusion Toys to make everyone fight each other. As she announces her plans to leave Yokohama, the Gentleman Thieves fight against her to stop her, but to no avail. She defeats the thieves and proceeds to destroy the academy, leaving Milky Holmes and everyone else behind.
8 (20)	"Isn't it Lovely?"; Transliteration: "Itōshī Yone" (Japanese: 愛おしいよね)	February 23, 2012
After spending the night searching for Henriette, the girls discover that the Academy is being shut down and all its residents being transferred elsewhere except for Milky Holmes. As both Milky Holmes and the Gentleman Thieves start to lose their grip on reality from missing Henriette, Cordelia unleashes a strange power that traps everyone in an illusion. Kamaboko manages to get Stone River out of the illusion, who in turn gets help from Hercule to rescue everyone else. As the Gentlemen Thieves part ways, Milky Holmes decides to start up a new Holmes Detective Academy.
9 (21)	"Got Vacation? Then Take It 2"; Transliteration: "Yūkyū Aru? Sā Shutokusubeku Tsu" (Japanese: 有給ある？ さぁ取得すべく2)	March 1, 2012
Annoyed that the other G4 members are having a day off whilst she herself is stuck with paperwork, Kokoro enlists the help of Milky Holmes to annoy them. When they soon figure out her plan, she instead has Milky Holmes pose as the Gentlemen Thieves to steal a case from a group of policemen and lure G4 into action. As G4 discover the policemen are actually thieves, Milky Holmes discover a captured singer inside the case and are praised for her rescue. Meanwhile, Mori steals an interesting artifact.
10 (22)	"Y.H. Confused?"; Transliteration: "Y.H. Konran Shiterassharu?" (Japanese: Y.H. 混乱してらっしゃる?)	March 8, 2012
Mori tells Milky Holmes they may be able to regain their Toys by finding an artifact called Pandora's Pot underneath the ruins of Holmes Detective Academy. However, what they actually unleash are all the evil Toys that Sherlock Holmes had sealed away long ago. As Mori makes off with one of the Toys, the rest are absorbed by the lard obsessed Buta, who vows revenge against Milky Holmes from keeping him from his lard. Gaining incredibly power from the Toys, Buta starts to steal all the lard and fat in Yokohama, causing everyone to become all dried up and full of static electricity. G4 and the Gentlemen Thieves stand against Buta, but he uses a powerful Toys that turns everyone into no-good idiots. However, Milky Holmes are unaffected, since they are already idiots, so Buta uses all his lard to transform into a new form.
11 (23)	"God of Lard"; Transliteration: "Rādo no Kami" (Japanese: ラードの神)	March 15, 2012
Wanting to create a world made entirely of lard, Buta attempts to steal the Legendary Lard, but Milky Holmes stands in his way. Meanwhile, Arséne, who is in London, encounters Sonia, who attempts to convince her that Milky Holmes haven't lost their way. As Buta manages to retrieve the Legendary Lard and starts absorbing lard from across the globe, Milky Holmes stand up to them and regain their Toys and work together to fight against Buta. Undeterred, Buta fuses himself with the lard he has amassed to evolve into a new form, but Arséne manages to get herself across the globe to stop him, allowing Milky Holmes to use Arsene Lupin's straw to defeat Buta and return the lard to its rightful place. As the true God of Lard takes away the evil Toys, Arséne reunites with the Gentlemen Thieves.
12 (24)	"The Return of Henriette"; Transliteration: "Anrietto no Kikan" (Japanese: アンリエットの帰還)	March 22, 2012
Wanting to get Milky Holmes back into action now that they've recovered their Toys, Henriette tries to make a memorable reunion with the girls but keeps failing. Meanwhile, the girls decide to enter a mascot contest for the Detective Fair, prompting Henriette to enter in secret. Both Sherlock and Henriette make it to the final round, in which they must dance together. Henriette wins the contest and reveals herself to the others, only for a boob-related mishap to cause Milky Holmes to lose their Toys yet again. Nevertheless, Henriette helps to start up the Holmes Detective Academy from scratch.

=== Tantei Opera Milky Holmes Alternative (2012 TV special) ===
No.	Title	Original release date
1	"Alternative One: Opera Kobayashi and the Five Paintings"; Transliteration: "Alternative One: Kobayashi Opera to Gōmai no Kaiga" (Japanese: Alternative One: 小林オペラと5枚の絵画)	August 25, 2012
Set in the same universe as the PSP games, Milky Holmes arrive in London where they meet a girl called Lily Adler, who seeks the help of their old mentor, Opera Kobayashi, to search for a painting of her grandmother that was stolen from her home. Taking on the case, the gang learn there have been several other related robberies in which paintings were stolen. As they interview the victims, they start to piece together how the paintings are related. They soon encounter another victim who was robbed, who believes the culprit to be an invisible man. Through careful deduction, they discover the culprit is the owner of the fifth painting in the set, Adiele, who is revealed to actually be a Gentleman Thief named Kitty Evans. Kitty attempts to escape using her Invisibility Toys, she is thwarted thanks to the combined efforts of Milky Holmes and Lily. As Opera tries to get Kitty to reveal her motive, she is hit from afar by something which causes her to lose her memory.
2	"Alternative Two: Opera Kobayashi and the Raven of the Empty Sky"; Transliteration: "Alternative Two: Kobayashi Opera to Kokū no Ōgarasu" (Japanese: Alternative Two: 小林オペラと虚空の大鴉)	January 9, 2013

=== Futari wa Milky Holmes (2013) ===
No.	Title	Original release date
1 (25)	"Always the Two of Us"; Transliteration: "Itsumo no Futari" (Japanese: いつものふたり)	July 13, 2013
Alice Myoujingawa and Kazumi Tokiwa are two friends who aspire to become great detectives like Milky Holmes. Whilst on a day out, they spot a thief and decide to pursue him. Although his escape is thwarted by the arrival of Milky Holmes, he is retrieved by other members of a group of thieves calling themselves Color the Phantom.
2 (26)	"By "Become", You Mean..."; Transliteration: ""Naru" to Iu koto" (Japanese: 「なる」ということ)	July 20, 2013
Alice and Kazumi decide to sneak into Holmes Academy for a chance to see Milky Holmes, where they end up getting inadvertently knocked out by them. As the two state their desire to be just like Milky Holmes, they simply respond by saying if they want it, they should just do it, whilst trying to keep up a classy image. Later that night, Alice and Kazumi encounter the thief from before, Red Lion, donning their new detective uniforms to fight against him. Whilst Kazumi's Arrow Toys prove to be ineffective, she suddenly manages to shoot out a powerful arrow that knocks Red Lion out. The girls leave him in the custody of the police, leaving behind a calling card naming themselves "Feathers".
3 (27)	"My Toys"; Transliteration: "Watashi no Toizu" (Japanese: わたしのトイズ)	July 27, 2013
As word about Feathers spreads, receiving both support and criticism, Kazumi feels irritated when her teacher passes them off as 'fake detectives'. Whilst Kazumi has dinner at Alice's house, one of Color the Phantom appears during a television chat show, threatening to take the license of detective named Ryuko Komatsu. Alice and Kazumi decide to sneak out, later finding Ryuko with her license allegedly stolen by one of the Phantoms. As they go search for it, they are lured into a trap in which Alice is separated from Kazumi, who finds herself up against the illusionist, Blue Hunter, and being completely surrounded by his illusions.
4 (28)	"Feelings That Will Never Lose"; Transliteration: "Makenai Kimochi" (Japanese: まけないきもち)	August 3, 2013
After Blue Phantom retreats upon the arrival of Milky Holmes, Kazumi is downhearted that she couldn't use the powerful arrow from before. Whilst heading to ask Milky Holmes for advice again the next day, Kazumi comes across a staircase leading to a mysterious room containing logs of the times Milky Holmes had lost their toys, helping her to realise more than one Phantom was involved the previous night. Later that day, they manage to trap Ryuko, who is revealed to be one of Color the Phantom, Yellow Black Hole. As the Blue Hunter joins the attack, Alice deduces the powerful arrow Kazumi shot the other day comes from combining their Toys together, knocking back Blue Hunter and revealing him to be a TV presenter. Ryuko leaves a cryptic message about what drove her to become a Phantom Thief before escaping with Blue Hunter.
5 (29)	"Mysterious Old Lady"; Transliteration: "Nazo no Obaa-san" (Japanese: 謎のおばあさん)	August 10, 2013
As Alice and Kazumi take up part-time jobs to fund their Feathers activities, Alice takes note of an old lady who seems to come to the same bar by every day. Curious, they decide to follow the old lady on the bus and eventually runs into her, where she tells them about how she often goes on the bus to meet someone. The next day, Alice and Kazumi notice something off when they spot the old lady going off with the bar master, deducing that she is in fact a phantom thief named La Lunar, who uses deception Toys that allow others to perceive her as different people. After Alice and Kazumi manage to stop La Lunar, the girls realise the person the old lady keeps meeting with is the bus driver, who is actually her estranged son she was working up the courage to talk to.
6 (30)	"Returning Home"; Transliteration: "Ouchi ni Kaerō" (Japanese: おうちに帰ろう)	August 17, 2013
As Ryuko attempts to steal a gold panda, she is thwarted by the mysterious phantom thief, Visconte. Meanwhile, Kazumi argues with her father, who is often worried about her. Later that night, the girls learn of an announcement by Visconte to steal a jewel and decide to go after him. After making him veer off course with their arrow, they find he has left the jewel behind, leaving a note commending Feathers' efforts. Meanwhile, it is revealed that Visconte is actually Alice's father.
7 (31)	"The Beginning of the End"; Transliteration: "Owari no Hajimari" (Japanese: 終わりのはじまり)	August 24, 2013
Alice's parents confront her older brother, Shion, who, unbeknownst to Alice, is Color the Phantom's leader, Violet Shadow. Meanwhile, Ryuko leads Alice and Kazumi into a trap, but Alice manages to see through her trickery and defeat her. As Ryuko is taken into custody, the white and black phantoms, Great White Doom Angel and Darkside Revolution, who had been monitoring their battle, show Shion the true identity of the Feathers.
8 (32)	"Himeyuri-senpai"; Transliteration: "Himeyuri-senpai" (Japanese: 姫百合せんぱい)	August 31, 2013
Alice and Kazumi are called over by Milky Holmes to meet Ellery Himeyuri, who had previously helped them during a case years ago, asking them to let her stay at Alice's house during her last night in Yokohama. Ellery spends the evening with Alice and Kazumi, where she reveals she knows their identities as Feathers. That night, they learn of a French thief named Monseur Miller, who uses his Toys to make duplicates of himself out of mirrors. Using her own Induction ability to copy Alice's Toys, Ellery manages to stop Miller by using Alice's shields to deflect Kazumi's arrows. As Kazumi grows concerned that Alice is much stronger than she is, Kokoro's police partner Keiko Totsugawa, who is secretly one of Color the Phantom, takes a picture of the Feathers and learns about Alice being Shion's brother.
9 (33)	"Your Own Strength"; Transliteration: "Jibun no Chikara" (Japanese: じぶんのちから)	September 7, 2013
Keiko appears before Shion and Visconte, using her Toys to wipe their memories of their encounter. As Kazumi's continues to be downhearted that her Toys are allegedly weaker than Alice's, Color the Phantom announce their intent to steal Visconte's 'most important treasure'. Keiko arranges for Alice and Kazumi, Visconte and his wife, Madame Visconte, Shion and Milky Holmes to the top of a skyscraper. There, Shion reveals his identity to Alice, attempting to recruit her as a phantom thief, but Kazumi suddenly steps in, deciding to become a thief in Alice's place.
10 (34)	"Together No Matter What"; Transliteration: "Itsudemo Issho" (Japanese: いつでもいっしょ)	September 14, 2013
As Kazumi ends up joining Color the Phantom, going against Keiko's calculations to have Alice join, Alice discovers a hidden room in her house, confirming her parents are also phantom thieves. Keiko decides to test Kazumi's resolve by having her Opera Kobayashi's cap, but she is unable to go through with it. After pointing out that Kazumi had only joined out of inferiority to Alice's powers, she escapes, leaving Kazumi alone to fight against Milky Holmes. However, Alice steps in to protect Kazumi, telling her she is willing to become a thief as well in order to stay with her. Realizing that what she wanted all along was to stay by Alice's side, Kazumi decides to return to being a detective.
11 (35)	"Everyone Plus Two"; Transliteration: "Minna to Futari" (Japanese: みんなとふたり)	September 21, 2013
Shion assembles all the members of Color the Phantom, including those previously captured, announcing that he intends to disband the group. However, he is apprehended by Great White Doom Angel and Darkside Revolution, who assume control of the group and launch an attack on the city to lure Alice and Kazumi out. Arriving at a tower, they are not only assisted by Kokoro and her Genius 4 Unit, but are also helped by Arséne and her Gentleman Thief Empire. They soon come up against Doom Angel and Darkside, who seek to claim Shion for their own and attack with their Toys, but are soon joined by Milky Holmes.
12 (36)	"A New Twosome"; Transliteration: "Atarashii Futari" (Japanese: あたらしいふたり)	September 28, 2013
Whilst Milky Holmes fights against a demon created from Doom Angel and Darkside's Toys, Alice and Kazumi head to the rooftop, where they find the two planning to unleash a giant ball of energy destroy Yokohama. However, their Toys go out of control and suck themselves inside the ball. Believing in their own strength, Alice and Kazumi use their combined toys to destroy the ball, whilst Shion manages to save Doom Angel and Darkside using his own Toys of flight. As the incident comes to a close, some of Color the Phantom begin new lives, Milky Holmes decide to take Alice and Kazumi under their wing as Milky Holmes Feathers.

=== Tantei Kageki Milky Holmes TD (2015) ===
No.	Title	Original release date
1 (37)	"The Fairies are Hiding in the Forest"; Transliteration: "Yousei-tachi wa Mori ni Kakeru" (Japanese: 妖精たちは森に隠れる)	December 31, 2014 (preview); January 3, 2015
In the Great Age of Idols, a mysterious phantom thief starts using their Toys to steal the singing voices of idols all across Yokohama, including all their CDs. While looking into the matter, Kokoro investigates popular idol Marine Amagi, only to find her clear of suspicion as her Toys are simply used to materialize the Elements that make up her voice. Later, during one of her performances, Marine suddenly collapses, as it is soon discovered both her singing voice and Elements have been stolen. As Marine tries to adjust to a life without singing, Milky Holmes soon deduce that the culprit is Marine's manager, who has been possessed by one of Marine's elements, Melodia, who takes everyone to an alternate dimension to challenge them to a game for Marine's freedom. Despite initially falling behind, the detectives take advantage of the strange properties of the game world and win the game. Afterwards, Melodia explains that the manager isn't the true culprit who stole everyone's voices, stating she herself ended up with the manager by accident and resonated with her desires. With Melodia returning to Marine, along with some of her talent, Milky Holmes decide to help her retrieve her other missing Elements.
2 (38)	"Perfect Fool"; Transliteration: "Pāfekuto Fūru" (Japanese: パーフェクト・フール)	December 31, 2014 (preview); January 10, 2015
As Milky Holmes try to determine the whereabouts of the other Elements, Senra, a member of Marine's idol group BKT1000, decides to quit the group prior to an audition for a film role alongside Marine, which fellow member Miki is asked to audition for instead. Meanwhile, Kokoro is brainwashed by Keiko into becoming a masked idol competing against Marine while posing as one of Marine's elements. In the final audition, Marine's dedication to her fans exposes Keiko and frees Kokoro, earning Marine the role.
3 (39)	"The Curry Kingdom is Too Far Away"; Transliteration: "Karē no Kuni dewa Tō Sugiru" (Japanese: カレーの国では遠すぎる)	January 17, 2015
Marine is struggling with giving a convincing performance in a curry commercial, so she and Milky Holmes decide to head to a far off "power spot" to improve her confidence. However, the journey proves arguous as they end up missing their flight and have to travel on foot. As the journey goes on, Marine becomes annoyed with the slacking detectives and goes off on her own but gets captured by a prince. The prince, who is possessed by two of Marine's Elements, the Harmony sisters, issues a curry cooking contest between Milky Holmes and the Elements, which Milky Holmes manages to win due to the tears and sweat they put into making it.
4 (40)	"We Tried Being One-Hit Wonders"; Transliteration: "Ippatsu-ya Shitemiru" (Japanese: 一発屋シテミル)	January 24, 2015
Whilst looking for a hotel, the girls wind up at a creepy looking castle run by a one-hit wonder idol named Sakiko Kirumiya. Intrigued by the alleged luxury lifestyles one-hit wonders have, Milky Holmes decides to enter a swimsuit contest stamp rally so that they become ones themselves. Meanwhile, Sakiko, learning that Marine has no intention of staying as a one-hit wonder, traps her in an iron mask, hoping to keep her as one. After getting all but one stamp with help from the Feathers, Milky Holmes confront Sakiko, who is possessed by the third Element, Shout, in a Rock Quiz show, earning their final stamp, while Marine's desire to continue singing breaks her free from her mask.
5 (41)	"Carol's Ransom"; Transliteration: "Kyaroru no Minoshirokin" (Japanese: キャロルの身代金)	February 4, 2015 (stream) (Note: The January 31, 2015 television broadcast of Episode 5 was postponed "in light of current circumstances", speculated by some as referring to a terrorist situation involving the hostage and ransom demand of two Japanese nationals (one of them being Kenji Goto), and the similarity of it to the episode's theme. The episode was streamed online as scheduled, while its television broadcast was rescheduled to February 21, 2015.); February 21, 2015 (TV)
As Marine is set to star in a movie alongside child actress Carol Dodgson, Milky Holmes are hired as bodyguards when Carol receives a threatening letter. However, Carol seems less than willing to work with the others, especially Marine. After analysing the clues, Milky Holmes pretend to take Carol hostage in order to hold a surprise birthday party for her, deducing that she was the one who wrote the letter. Carol is then revealed to be possessed by another Element, Rhythmic, who challenges Milky Holmes and Marine to a giant block puzzle. After Milky Holmes manage to win using some sly hypnotism on Cordelia, Rhythmic explains how she resonated with Carol's fears of becoming an adult, while Carol and Marine become friends.
6 (42)	"Everything Will Become F5"; Transliteration: "Subete ga Efu-Go ni Naru" (Japanese: すべてがF5になる)	February 7, 2015
Marine comes to learn of an online imposter named Marima who is growing more popular than she is. Milky Holmes tracks down Marima, who agrees to take her videos down on the condition that they can make a video more popular than hers, putting their careers as detectives on the line. Marine soon makes a video that attracts the people's attention in earnest, while Milky Holmes discover that Marima had only got so many views by refreshing her video's page. Marima is then revealed to be possessed by another Element, Dancing, who challenges Milky Holmes to see who can best imitate a good-looking man, which Hercule manages to win due to having a sore throat.
7 (43)	"How Has the Yellow Character Been Remodelled?"; Transliteration: "Ki-iroi Kyara wa Ika ni Kaisō Sareta?" (Japanese: 黄色いキャラはいかに改装されたか？)	February 14, 2015
Following a trivial argument with the other girls, Nero starts to feel left out as the yellow character of the group. After having a nap, Nero suddenly wakes up with a drastically different personality, acting more kind-hearted than her usual self. Later, as the girls accompany Marine to a gig with actress Hiroko Tenma, Nero, who allegedly bears a resemblance to Hiroko's long lost daughter, decides to become her servant. However, after Marine hears that Hiroko never had a daughter, the girls return to discover that Nero has been possessed by the Poemy Element, who challenges Milky Holmes to a rakugo contest. Although Nero gets an early lead, Marine soon catches up with her and win. Afterwards, Nero returns to normal, learning that the one Nero resembled was Hiroko's late adopted son, while Hiroko rekindles with her maid, who was her legitimate daughter.
8 (44)	"The Mystery's Solution is a Cliché! Before and After"; Transliteration: "Nazotoki wa Sore ga Yappari o Yakusoku! no Zengo ni" (Japanese: 謎解きはそれがやっぱりお約束！の前後に)	February 28, 2015
Following an e-mail from Kobayashi, the girls travel to London where someone named Oscar Francoise Twilight has lost her own Element, Noblesse, affecting her Toys' ability to make perfect tea. As the detectives conduct their investigation, Marine gets to know Oscar, who feels guilty about injury her butler Andrew's eyes during childhood. Later that night, Cordelia protects Marine from a possessed suit of armor, initially believing the resident professor to be the culprit, only for him to deduce the culprit is actually Andrew, who was possessed by Noblesse due to his hatred for his goofy eyes. Noblesse challenges the girls to fight through a living maze, but they manage to win thanks to Cordelia coercing the maze itself to clear a path for them. Afterwards, Oscar and Andrew make up and reunite to each other, while it is revealed Kobayashi was the one acting as the professor in disguise.
9 (45)	"Casino Consideration"; Transliteration: "Cajino Omoiyaru" (Japanese: カジノ・思いやる)	March 7, 2015
A ouija board prophecy leads the detectives to Casino Island, which is having its opening ceremony. Upon arriving, the girls meets a strange girl who fell out of the sky who Sherlock names Anne Guardy. While the detectives search for a nearby Element, only to get addicted to gambling in the process, Marine is slightly downhearted to find Miki has become the center of her idol group. When Milky Holmes end up racking up a huge debt, they are challenged by the dealer Noir, who has been possessed by the Decrescendo Element, in an all-or-nothing poker match with the Elements on the line. After winning a few games by luck, Marine is challenged to cross a game board without falling through any bad panels, which she manages to accomplish. Afterwards, however, Marine is kidnapped by the casino's owner, Scarlet Ohada, and taken into the sky.
10 (46)	"Bonds Plus One"; Transliteration: "Kizuna Purasu Wan" (Japanese: きずなプラス1)	March 14, 2015
Noir, Scarlet's daughter, reveals that Scarlet had kidnapped Marine in order to obtain a priceless gem from a casino in the sky. Anne, who reveals herself to be the sky casino's guardian, opens up a portal and takes Sherlock, Miki, and Noir with her to rescue Marine, facing many traps along the way. Upon reaching Scarlet, they discover her to possessed by the Crescendo Element, who challenges Sherlock to a familiar card game. Although Sherlock wins the game, Scarlet refuses to relinquish Crescendo and continues to attack, prompting Miki to take it by force with her own Toys. After Marine is rescued, Anne stays behind while the others escape before the portal closes, hopeful that she'll meet Sherlock again someday.
11 (47)	"Vessel of Love"; Transliteration: "Ai no Utsuwa" (Japanese: 愛の器)	March 21, 2015
After hearing from Marine about how she got her Miracle Song from her mother, who died when she was little, the girls decide to visit her old apartment. There, they find an old drawing by Miki, who Marine remembers was her old childhood friend. Meanwhile, Miki makes an announcement that she intends to perform the Miracle Song as her debut single. Marine confronts Miki, who she deduces is the phantom thief who stole her Elements, but she uses her Toys to separate her Elements once again. However, the Elements remain by Marine's side and challenge Miki for the final Element, Amore, who wanted to cut her from the restrictions of the Miracle Song. Encouraged by Milky Holmes, Marine gains the strength to sing the Miracle Song without Amore's help, asking Miki to sing it alongside her.
12 (48)	"The Detective of the Opera"	March 28, 2015
While Marine is preparing for her revival concert as Miki takes time off her career, the Milky Holmes got tickets for Marine's concert. Meanwhile, Kokoro is furious because she can't get the ticket to Marine's revival concert as Keiko tries to ease her pain. On the day of her concert, they got a lot of cases to solve that delays their arrival. When they arrived the concert avenue, it was pitch black. Suddenly, the place slowly light up and found out that Marine is waiting for them for the last song. Marine's elements brought the Milky Holmes to the stage to sing the last song together with her as they recall the times they had together.
