= Yasuichi Oshima =

Japanese manga artist

Yasuichi Oshima (大島 やすいち, Ōshima Yasuichi; born 24 March 1954 in Kyoto) is a Japanese manga artist. In 1984, he won the Kodansha Manga Award for shōnen for Bats & Terry.

He is the father of manga artist Towa Oshima.

== Selected works ==
- Kenkaku Shōbai (2008–2021)
