= Bats & Terry =

Japanese manga series

- Cover of the first volume of Bats & Terry, as published in Japan by Kodansha

バツ&テリー (Batsu & Terii)
- Genre: Sports
- Manga
- Written by: Yasuichi Oshima
- Published by: Kodansha (former); Ichijinsha (current)
- Magazine: Weekly Shōnen Magazine
- Original run: 1982 – 1987
- Volumes: 24
- Anime film
- Directed by: Nobuo Mizuta
- Produced by: Masanori Ito; Masuo Ueda; Yoshihide Kondo
- Written by: Tatsumi Yano
- Studio: Sunrise
- Released: March 14, 1987
- Runtime: 80 minutes
- Video game
- Publisher: Use Corporation
- Genre: Action
- Platform: Nintendo Entertainment System
- Released: JPN: July 22, 1987

Bats & Terry (Japanese: バツ&テリー, Hepburn: Batsu & Teri) is a Japanese manga series written and illustrated by Yasuichi Oshima. It was serialized in Kodansha's Weekly Shōnen Magazine from 1982 to 1987. Batsu & Terī received the 1984 Kodansha Manga Award for the shōnen category. Kodansha published the manga's 24 tankōbon volumes to December 1987. The manga's license was transferred to Ichijinsha and was published into four wideban volumes.

The manga was adapted into an animated movie by Sunrise. Directed by Mitsuko Kase and Tetsuro Amino, the movie was released in Japan on March 14, 1987. A VHS was released for the movie on April 21, 1987.

The manga was adapted into a side-scrolling action game for the Family Computer. The game was developed and released by Use Corporation on July 22, 1987.

== Manga ==
Kodansha published the manga's 24 tankōbon volumes to December 1987. The manga was re-released into 12 kanzenban volumes between March 1991 and August 1991. The manga's license was transferred to Ichijinsha. Ichijinsha published the manga into four aizoban (wide-ban) volumes between July 27, 2008, and November 25, 2008.

== Game ==
The player controls a baseball superhero named Batsu (Bats) who must use baseballs to defeat his opponents. Being hit once reverts him to "normal" Terii (Terry), who swats at his opponents using a baseball bat. Opponents include machinery, humanoids, and animals. Killing opponents while in Terii form results in a larger energy bar.
