= List of television series and films based on Dark Horse Comics publications =

Below is a list of television series and feature films based on Dark Horse Comics publications, including its various imprints. This list includes live action and animated television series and films.

== Television ==
=== Live action ===
Title	Seasons	Episodes	Original running	Production studio	Network	Notes / Refs
Timecop	1	9	1997–98	Universal Television / Dark Horse Entertainment / Lawrence Gordon Productions / December 3rd Productions	ABC	Loosely based on the 1994 film and the Dark Horse Comics; 13 episodes ordered but only 9 episodes were aired.
Dark Matter	3	39	2015–17	Dark Horse Entertainment / Prodigy Pictures Inc. / Blue Penguin / Prescience	Space / Syfy	
The Umbrella Academy	4	36	2019–24	Dark Horse Entertainment / Universal Content Productions / Borderline Entertainment (seasons 1–2) / Irish Cowboy (seasons 3–4)	Netflix	
Resident Alien	4	44	2021–25	Universal Content Productions / Dark Horse Entertainment / Amblin Television / Jocko Productions	Syfy (seasons 1–3) / USA Network (season 4)	
In development
She Could Fly	TBA	TBA	TBA	AMC Studios / Dark Horse Entertainment	AMC	
Fear Agent	TBA	TBA	TBA	Sony Pictures Television / Point Grey Pictures	Amazon Prime Video	
Wyrd	TBA	TBA	TBA	20th Television / Dark Horse Entertainment / FX Productions / Vendetta Productions	FX	
Mind MGMT	TBA	TBA	TBA	Dark Horse Entertainment	Netflix	
Sin City	TBA	TBA	TBA	Legendary Television / Troublemaker Studios	TBA	
Grendel	TBA	TBA	TBA	Dark Horse Entertainment	TBA	
Minor Threats	TBA	TBA	TBA	Dark Horse Entertainment	Netflix	

=== Specials ===
Title	Original running	Production studio	Network	Notes
The B.P.R.D. Declassified	2004	Visible Man Productions	FX	Live-action special, run length of 22 minutes, aired on March 22, 2004.

=== Animated series ===
Title	Seasons	Episodes	Original running	Production studio	Network	Notes / Refs
Duckman	4	70	1994–97	Paramount Television / Klasky Csupo / Reno & Osborn Productions	USA Network	
The Mask: Animated Series	3	54	1995–97	New Line Television / Dark Horse Entertainment / Film Roman / Sunbow Entertainment	CBS	Loosely based on the 1994 film and the Dark Horse Comics of the same name.
Fat Dog Mendoza	2	26	2000	Sony Wonder Television / TMO-Loonland Film GmbH / Sunbow Entertainment	Cartoon Network	
Big Guy and Rusty the Boy Robot	2	26	1999–2001	Columbia TriStar Television / Adelaide Productions / Dark Horse Entertainment	Fox Kids	
Hipira	1	12	2009	US / Dark Horse Comics	NHK BS-52	
Axe Cop	2	22	2013–15	ADHD Studios / Friends Night	Fox (season 1); FXX (season 2)	
The Rocketeer	1	22	2019–20	Wild Canary Animation / Icon Creative Studio	Disney Junior	
Samurai Rabbit: The Usagi Chronicles	2	20	2022	Netflix Animation / Gaumont Animation / Dark Horse Entertainment / Atomic Monster	Netflix	Based on the comics by Stan Sakai.
Ongoing
Iyanu	2	22	2025–present	Lion Forge Entertainment / YouNeek Studios / Impact X Capital / Forefront Media Group / Superprod	Cartoon Network / Max	
In development
Hungry Ghosts	TBA	TBA	TBA	Sony Pictures Animation	TBA	
Lady Danger	TBA	TBA	TBA	G-Unit Films and Television Inc. / Make Good Content	Amazon Freevee	

=== Motion comics ===
Title	Seasons	Episodes	Year	Production studio	Network	Notes
Buffy the Vampire Slayer Season Eight Motion Comic	1	19	2010	Fox Home Entertainment	Amazon Prime Video / iTunes	
Dark Horse Motion Comics	1	32	2012	Geek & Sundry	YouTube	

=== Pilots ===
Title	Year	Production studio	Network	Notes
The Amazing Screw-On Head	2006	Lionsgate Television / Kickstart Productions / Living Dead Guy Productions	Sci-Fi Channel	Failed animated pilot, 22 minutes long, aired on August 20, 2006.

== Films ==
=== Live action ===
Year	Title	Production studio	Notes
1994	The Mask	New Line Cinema / Dark Horse Entertainment	Received 1 Oscar nomination.
1994	Timecop	Universal Pictures / Dark Horse Entertainment / Largo Entertainment / Signature Pictures / Renaissance Pictures	
1995	Tank Girl	United Artists / Trilogy Entertainment Group	
1996	Enemy	TriStar Television / Dark Horse Entertainment	Television film; failed pilot.
1996	Barb Wire	PolyGram Filmed Entertainment / Dark Horse Entertainment / Propaganda Films	
1999	Virus	Universal Pictures / Dark Horse Entertainment / Mutual Film Company / Valhalla Motion Pictures	
1999	Mystery Men	Universal Pictures / Dark Horse Entertainment / Golar Productions	
2000	G-Men from Hell	Sawmill Entertainment	Direct-to-video.
2003	American Splendor	Fine Line Features / Dark Horse Entertainment / HBO Films / Good Machine	Received 1 Oscar nomination.
2003	Timecop 2: The Berlin Decision	Universal Pictures	Direct-to-video; sequel to Timecop.
2004	Hellboy	Columbia Pictures / Dark Horse Entertainment / Revolution Studios / Lawrence Gordon/Lloyd Levin Productions	
2004	Alien vs. Predator	20th Century Fox / Brandywine Productions / Davis Entertainment / Impact Pictures / Stillking Films	
2005	Son of the Mask	New Line Cinema / Dark Horse Entertainment / Radar Pictures	Sequel to The Mask.
2005	Sin City	Miramax / Dimension Films / Troublemaker Studios	Written, produced and co-directed by Frank Miller.
2007	300	Warner Bros. Pictures / Legendary Pictures / Virtual Studios / Atmosphere Pictures / Hollywood Gang Productions	Frank Miller served as executive producer.
2007	Aliens vs. Predator: Requiem	20th Century Fox / Brandywine Productions / Davis Entertainment / Dune Entertainment	Sequel to Alien vs. Predator.
2008	Hellboy II: The Golden Army	Universal Pictures / Dark Horse Entertainment / Relativity Media / Lawrence Gordon/Lloyd Levin Productions	Sequel to the 2004 film Hellboy. Received 1 Oscar nomination.
2013	R.I.P.D.	Universal Pictures / Dark Horse Entertainment / Original Film	
2014	300: Rise of an Empire	Warner Bros. Pictures / Legendary Pictures / Cruel and Unusual Films / Atmosphere Pictures / Hollywood Gang Productions	Sequel to 300.
2014	Sin City: A Dame to Kill For	The Weinstein Company / Dimension Films / Aldamisa Productions / Demarest Films / Troublemaker Studios / Miramax / Solipsist Films / A. R. Films	Sequel to Sin City.
2019	Polar	Netflix / Constantin Film / Dark Horse Entertainment / JB Pictures	
2019	Hellboy	Lionsgate Films / Summit Entertainment / Dark Horse Entertainment / Millennium Media / Nu Boyana Film Studios / Campbell Grobman Films / Lawrence Gordon/Lloyd Levin Productions	First reboot of the Hellboy film series.
2022	R.I.P.D. 2: Rise of the Damned	Universal 1440 Entertainment / Dark Horse Entertainment	Direct-to-video; prequel to R.I.P.D.
2024	Hellboy: The Crooked Man	Ketchup Entertainment / Millennium Media / Dark Horse Entertainment / Nu Boyana Film Studios / Campbell Grobman Films	Second reboot of the Hellboy film series.
In development
TBA	Tank Girl	Metro-Goldwyn-Mayer / LuckyChap Entertainment	Reboot of Tank Girl.
TBA	Mystery Girl	Netflix / Dark Horse Entertainment / Wonderland Sound and Vision / She Ready Productions	
TBA	Lady Killer	Netflix / Dark Horse Entertainment / B for Effort	
TBA	Dept. H	Netflix / Dark Horse Entertainment	
TBA	Bang!	Netflix / Dark Horse Entertainment / 87North Productions	
TBA	The Black Kaiser	XYZ Fims / Constantin Film / Dark Horse Entertainment / JB Pictures	

=== Animated films ===
Year	Title	Production studio	Notes
2006	Hellboy: Sword of Storms	Starz Media / Film Roman / Revolution Studios	The first film of the Hellboy Animated series. Premiered on Cartoon Network on October 28, 2006, later released on DVD on February 6, 2007.
2007	Hellboy: Blood and Iron	Starz Media / Film Roman / Revolution Studios	The second film of the Hellboy Animated series. Premiered on Cartoon Network on March 10, 2007, later released on DVD on June 12, 2007.
2022	Chickenhare and the Hamster of Darkness	Sony Pictures International Productions / nWave Pictures / Octopolis	Theatrical release. Released on Netflix in the United States and select territories.
2025	Chickenhare and the Secret of the Groundhog	nWave Pictures	
In development
TBA	The Goon	Netflix Animation / Dark Horse Entertainment / Blur Studio / Chernin Entertainment	
TBA	Emily the Strange	Warner Bros. Pictures / Warner Bros. Pictures Animation / Bad Robot	

=== Shorts ===
Year	Title	Production studio	Notes
2008	Hellboy: Iron Shoes	Starz Media / Film Roman / Revolution Studios	Bonus feature for the DVD release of Hellboy: Blood and Iron. First short of the Hellboy Animated series.
2010	Hellboy: The Dark Below	Starz Media / Film Roman / Revolution Studios	Second and final short of the Hellboy Animated series.
2013	R.I.P.D.	Titmouse, Inc.	Released on Adult Swim; promotional prequel short to the feature-length film of the same name.

== Reception ==
=== Box office ===
Title	Distributor(s)	Release date (United States)	Budget (in millions)	Box office gross		
Title	Distributor(s)	Release date (United States)	Budget (in millions)	Opening weekend (North America)	North America	Worldwide
The Mask	New Line Cinema / Dark Horse Entertainment	July 29, 1994	$23	$23,117,068	$119,938,730	$351,583,407
Timecop	Universal Studios / Largo Entertainment / JVC Entertainment Inc.	September 16, 1994	$27	$12,064,625	$44,853,581	$101,646,581
Tank Girl	United Artists	March 31, 1995	$25	$2,018,183	$4,064,495	$4,064,495
Barb Wire	Gramercy Pictures / Dark Horse Entertainment	May 3, 1996	$9	$1,844,426	$3,793,614	$3,793,614
Virus	Universal Pictures	January 15, 1999	$75	$6,013,640	$14,036,005	$30,652,005
Mystery Men	Universal Pictures	July 30, 1999	$68	$10,017,865	$29,762,011	$33,461,011
G-Men from Hell	Sawmill Entertainment	July 22, 2000	Unknown	Unknown	Unknown	Unknown
American Splendor	Good Machine / HBO Films / Dark Horse Entertainment	August 15, 2003	$2	$159,705	$6,010,990	$8,000,000
Timecop 2: The Berlin Decision	Universal Pictures	September 30, 2003	Unknown	Unknown	Unknown	Unknown
Hellboy	Columbia Pictures / Dark Horse Entertainment	April 2, 2004	$66	$23,172,440	$59,623,958	$99,318,987
Alien vs. Predator	20th Century Fox	August 13, 2004	$60	$38,291,056	$80,282,231	$172,544,654
Son of the Mask	New Line Cinema / Dark Horse Entertainment	February 18, 2005	$84	$7,511,675	$17,018,422	$57,600,000
Sin City	Dimension Films / Troublemaker Studios	April 1, 2005	$40	$29,120,273	$74,103,820	$158,753,820
300	Warner Bros. Pictures / Legendary Pictures / Virtual Studios	March 9, 2007	$65	$70,885,301	$210,614,939	$456,068,181
Aliens vs. Predator: Requiem	20th Century Fox	December 25, 2007	$40	$10,059,425	$41,797,066	$128,884,494
Hellboy II: The Golden Army	Universal Pictures / Dark Horse Entertainment	July 11, 2008	$85	$34,539,115	$75,986,503	$185,258,983
R.I.P.D.	Universal Pictures / Dark Horse Entertainment	July 19, 2013	$130	$12,691,415	$33,618,855	$78,477,749
300: Rise of an Empire	Warner Bros. Pictures / Legendary Pictures / Virtual Studios	March 7, 2014	$110	$45,038,460	$106,580,051	$331,114,051
Sin City: A Dame to Kill For	Dimension Films / Troublemaker Studios	August 22, 2014	$65	$6,317,683	$13,754,898	$39,407,616
Polar	Netflix / Constantin film	January 25, 2019	Unknown	Unknown	Unknown	Unknown
Hellboy	Lionsgate Films / Dark Horse Entertainment / Millennium Films / Campbell Grobman Films / Nu Boyana / Lawrence Gordon Productions	April 12, 2019	$50	$12,045,147	$21,903,748	$55,065,289
Chickenhare and the Hamster of Darkness	Sony Pictures International Productions / nWave Pictures / Octopolis	January 23, 2022	$20	Unknown	Unknown	$10,885,116
R.I.P.D. 2: Rise of the Damned	Universal 1440 Entertainment / Dark Horse Entertainment	November 15, 2022	Unknown	Unknown	Unknown	Unknown
Hellboy: The Crooked Man	Ketchup Entertainment / Millennium Media / Dark Horse Entertainment / Nu Boyana Film Studios / Campbell Grobman Films	October 8, 2024	$20	Unknown	Unknown	$2,661,545
Chickenhare and the Secret of the Groundhog	nWave Studios / Octopolis / SND / Sony Pictures	October 15, 2025	$23	Unknown	Unknown	$9,688,921
Total			$1.087 billion	$345,777,891	$962,353,736	$2,323,540,338

=== Critical and public reception ===
Film	Rotten Tomatoes	Metacritic	CinemaScore
The Mask	77% (52 reviews)	56 (12 reviews)	B+
Timecop	45% (42 reviews)	48 (17 reviews)	B+
Tank Girl	40% (43 reviews)	—N/a	B
Barb Wire	28% (36 reviews)	40 (14 reviews)	—N/a
Virus	12% (49 reviews)	19 (17 reviews)	C
Mystery Men	61% (104 reviews)	65 (24 reviews)	C+
G-Men from Hell	—N/a	—N/a	—N/a
American Splendor	94% (186 reviews)	90 (42 reviews)	—N/a
Timecop 2: The Berlin Decision	—N/a (2 reviews)	—N/a	—N/a
Hellboy	81% (204 reviews)	72 (37 reviews)	B−
Alien vs. Predator	21% (149 reviews)	29 (21 reviews)	B
Son of the Mask	6% (105 reviews)	20 (26 reviews)	B−
Sin City	77% (250 reviews)	74 (40 reviews)	B
300	61% (236 reviews)	52 (42 reviews)	A−
Aliens vs. Predator: Requiem	12% (78 reviews)	29 (14 reviews)	C
Hellboy II: The Golden Army	86% (247 reviews)	78 (36 reviews)	B
R.I.P.D.	13% (100 reviews)	25 (27 reviews)	C+
300: Rise of an Empire	45% (192 reviews)	48 (34 reviews)	B−
Sin City: A Dame to Kill For	43% (183 reviews)	46 (38 reviews)	B−
Polar	20% (45 reviews)	19 (12 reviews)	—N/a
Hellboy	17% (222 reviews)	31 (44 reviews)	C
Chickenhare and the Hamster of Darkness	60% (5 reviews)	—N/a (1 review)	—N/a
R.I.P.D. 2: Rise of the Damned	25% (4 reviews)	—N/a (2 reviews)	—N/a
Hellboy: The Crooked Man	40% (42 reviews)	44 (8 reviews)	—N/a
Chickenhare and the Secret of the Groundhog	—N/a	—N/a	—N/a
List indicator: A dark grey cell indicates information is not available for the film.

== See also ==
- Dark Horse Entertainment
- List of unproduced Dark Horse Comics projects
