= List of television series and films based on Archie Comics publications =

This is a list of television series and films based on Archie Comics publications. This list includes live-action and animated series and films.

== Television ==
=== Live-action ===
Title	Seasons	Episodes	Original running	Production company	Network	Notes
Sabrina the Teenage Witch	7	163	1996–2003	Viacom Productions / CBS Television Distribution	ABC (seasons 1–4); The WB (seasons 5–7)	
Acemi Cadı	2	58	2005–07	D Productions	Star TV	Turkish series heavily based on Sabrina the Teenage Witch.
Riverdale	7	137	2017–23	Berlanti Productions / Warner Bros. Television Studios / CBS Studios	The CW	Part of the Archieverse
Chilling Adventures of Sabrina	4	36	2018–20	Berlanti Productions / Warner Bros. Television	Netflix	Part of the Archieverse
Katy Keene	1	13	2020	Berlanti Productions / Warner Bros. Television / CBS Television Studios	The CW	Part of the Archieverse
Upcoming
Afterlife with Archie	1	TBA	2027	Archie Comics Studios / Berlanti Productions / Muckle Man / Warner Bros. Television	Disney+	

=== Pilots ===
Title	Year	Network	Notes
Life with Archie	1962	?	Not ordered to series
Archie	1964	NBC	Not ordered to series
Archie	1976	ABC	Not ordered to series
The Archie Situation Comedy Musical Variety Show	1978	ABC	Not ordered to series

=== Animated series ===
Title	Seasons	Episodes	Original running	Production company(s)	Network	Notes
The Archie Show	1	17	1968–1969	Filmation	CBS	Part of The Archie Show franchise
The Archie Comedy Hour	—N/a	—N/a	1969–1970	Filmation	CBS	Part of The Archie Show franchise
Archie's Funhouse	—N/a	—N/a	1970–1971	Filmation	CBS	Part of The Archie Show franchise
Josie and the Pussycats	2	32	1970–1971	Hanna-Barbera	CBS	
Groovie Goolies	1	16	1970–1972	Filmation	CBS	Series featuring Sabrina Spellman as a secondary character.
Archie's TV Funnies	1	16	1971–1973	Filmation	CBS	Part of The Archie Show franchise
The Sabrina the Teenage Witch Show	1	31	1971–1974	Filmation	CBS	Part of The Archie Show franchise
Josie and the Pussycats in Outer Space	1	16	1972	Hanna-Barbera	CBS	Sequel to Josie and the Pussycats
The U.S. of Archie	1	16	1974–1976	Filmation	CBS	Part of The Archie Show franchise
The New Archie and Sabrina Hour	1	13	1977	Filmation	CBS	Part of The Archie Show franchise
The New Archies	1	13	1987	DIC Entertainment	NBC	
Sabrina: The Animated Series	1	65	1999	DIC Entertainment	UPN/ABC	
Archie's Weird Mysteries	1	40	1999–2000	DIC Entertainment	Ion Television	
Sabrina's Secret Life	1	26	2003–2004	DIC Entertainment	Syndication	
Sabrina: Secrets of a Teenage Witch	1	26	2013–2014	MoonScoop Group	Hub Network	
Superhero Kindergarten	1	26	2021	Genius Brands	Kartoon Channel	

== Film ==
=== Live-action ===
Year	Title	Production studio(s)	Notes
2001	Josie and the Pussycats	Universal Pictures/Metro-Goldwyn-Mayer	
2023	The Archies	Netflix/Tiger Baby Productions/Graphic India	Hindi film

=== Television films ===
Year	Title	Notes
1990	Archie: To Riverdale and Back Again	Aired on NBC, pilot for an unproduced TV series.
1996	Sabrina the Teenage Witch	Aired on Showtime, pilot for TV series.
1997	Mr. Wright	Clueless TV series crossover special with Sabrina
1998	Sabrina Goes to Rome	Aired on ABC, connected to TV series.
1999	Sabrina Down Under	Aired on ABC, connected to TV series.

=== Animated films ===
Year	Title	Notes
1969	Archie and His New Pals	Aired on CBS
1972	Daffy Duck and Porky Pig Meet the Groovie Goolies	Groovie Goolies special
2002	The Archies in JugMan	Related to Archie's Weird Mysteries.
2002	Sabrina: Friends Forever	Related to Sabrina: The Animated Series.
2014	Stan Lee's Mighty 7: Beginnings	Loosely based on the comic of the same name.

== Recurring cast live-actions ==
Archieverse (2017–2023)

Actor	Character	Appearances		
Actor	Character	Riverdale	Chilling Adventures of Sabrina	Katy Keene
Ashleigh Murray	Josie McCoy	Main		Main
Casey Cott	Kevin Keller	Main		Guest
Mark Consuelos	Hiram Lodge	Main		Guest
Moses Thiessen	Ben Button	Recurring	Guest	
Robin Givens	Sierra McCoy	Recurring		Guest
Kiernan Shipka	Sabrina Spellman	Guest	Main	
Ty Wood	Billy Marlin	Guest	Recurring	
Lucy Hale	Katy Keene	Guest		Main
Camille Hyde	Alexandra "Xandra" Cabot	Guest		Main
Zane Holtz	KO Kelly	Guest		Main
Ryan Faucett	Bernardo Bixby	Guest		Recurring

== Reception ==
=== Box office ===
Film	Release date	Box office revenue			Budget	Reference
Film	Release date	Domestic	Foreign	Worldwide	Budget	Reference
Josie and the Pussycats	April 11, 2001	$14,271,015	$595,000	$14,866,015	$57 million	

=== Critical and public reception ===
Film	Rotten Tomatoes	Metacritic	CinemaScore
Josie and the Pussycats	53% (123 reviews)	47 (29 reviews)	B
The Archies	63% (27 reviews)	66 (6 reviews)	—N/a
