= List of films based on Marvel Comics publications =

Marvel Comics is a publisher of American comic books and related media. It counts among its characters such well-known superheroes as Spider-Man, Wolverine, Iron Man, Captain America, Thor, Hulk, Black Panther, Doctor Strange, Ant-Man, Daredevil, and Deadpool, and such teams as the Avengers, the X-Men, the Fantastic Four, and the Guardians of the Galaxy. Most of Marvel's fictional characters are depicted in a shared fictional universe, with most locations mirroring real-life places. Many major characters are based in New York City.

Films based on Marvel Comics properties have included theatrically released film serials, live action and animated feature films, direct-to-video releases, and television films.

== Live-action films ==
=== Feature films ===
Live-action feature films and shorts produced by Marvel Studios are set within the Marvel Cinematic Universe (MCU) unless otherwise noted.

Year	Title	Studio(s)	Notes
1986	Howard the Duck	Lucasfilm	Distributed by Universal Pictures
1998	Blade	New Line Cinema	
2000	X-Men	20th Century Fox	
2002	Blade II	New Line Cinema	
2002	Spider-Man	Columbia Pictures	Nominated for 2 Oscars
2003	Daredevil	20th Century Fox	Co-produced by Regency Enterprises
2003	X2	20th Century Fox	
2003	Hulk	Universal Pictures	
2004	The Punisher	Artisan Entertainment	Distributed by Lionsgate Films in the U.S. and Canada and Columbia TriStar Film Distributors International in other territories
2004	Spider-Man 2	Columbia Pictures	Won 1 Oscar, nominated for 2 more
2004	Blade: Trinity	New Line Cinema	
2005	Elektra	20th Century Fox	Co-produced by Regency Enterprises
2005	Fantastic Four	20th Century Fox	
2006	X-Men: The Last Stand	20th Century Fox	
2007	Ghost Rider	Columbia Pictures	
2007	Spider-Man 3	Columbia Pictures	
2007	Fantastic Four: Rise of the Silver Surfer	20th Century Fox	
2008	Iron Man	Marvel Studios	Distributed by Paramount Pictures; nominated for 2 Oscars
2008	The Incredible Hulk	Marvel Studios	Distributed by Universal Pictures
2008	Punisher: War Zone	Lionsgate Films	Produced under the Marvel Knights banner; distributed by Columbia Pictures outside the United States
2009	X-Men Origins: Wolverine	20th Century Fox	
2010	Iron Man 2	Marvel Studios	Distributed by Paramount Pictures; nominated for 1 Oscar
2011	Thor	Marvel Studios	Distributed by Paramount Pictures
2011	X-Men: First Class	20th Century Fox	
2011	Captain America: The First Avenger	Marvel Studios	Distributed by Paramount Pictures
2011	Ghost Rider: Spirit of Vengeance	Columbia Pictures	Produced under the Marvel Knights banner
2012	The Avengers	Marvel Studios	First Marvel Studios film distributed by Walt Disney Studios Motion Pictures; nominated for 1 Oscar
2012	The Amazing Spider-Man	Columbia Pictures	
2013	Iron Man 3	Marvel Studios	Nominated for 1 Oscar
2013	The Wolverine	20th Century Fox	
2013	Thor: The Dark World	Marvel Studios	
2014	Captain America: The Winter Soldier	Marvel Studios	Nominated for 1 Oscar
2014	The Amazing Spider-Man 2	Columbia Pictures	
2014	X-Men: Days of Future Past	20th Century Fox	Nominated for 1 Oscar
2014	Guardians of the Galaxy	Marvel Studios	Nominated for 2 Oscars
2015	Avengers: Age of Ultron	Marvel Studios	
2015	Ant-Man	Marvel Studios	
2015	Fantastic Four	20th Century Fox	
2016	Deadpool	20th Century Fox	
2016	Captain America: Civil War	Marvel Studios	
2016	X-Men: Apocalypse	20th Century Fox	
2016	Doctor Strange	Marvel Studios	Nominated for 1 Oscar
2017	Logan	20th Century Fox	Nominated for 1 Oscar
2017	Guardians of the Galaxy Vol. 2	Marvel Studios	Nominated for 1 Oscar
2017	Spider-Man: Homecoming	Columbia Pictures / Marvel Studios	
2017	Thor: Ragnarok	Marvel Studios	
2018	Black Panther	Marvel Studios	Won 3 Oscars, nominated for 4 more
2018	Avengers: Infinity War	Marvel Studios	Nominated for 1 Oscar
2018	Deadpool 2	20th Century Fox	An alternate, PG-13 rated cut of the film entitled Once Upon a Deadpool was released later the same year.
2018	Ant-Man and the Wasp	Marvel Studios	
2018	Venom	Columbia Pictures	
2019	Captain Marvel	Marvel Studios	
2019	Avengers: Endgame	Marvel Studios	Nominated for 1 Oscar. A theatrical extended cut, Avengers Endgame: Encore, was released in September 2026.
2019	Dark Phoenix	20th Century Fox	
2019	Spider-Man: Far From Home	Columbia Pictures / Marvel Studios	
2020	The New Mutants	20th Century Studios	
2021	Black Widow	Marvel Studios	Released simultaneously in theaters and on Disney+
2021	Shang-Chi and the Legend of the Ten Rings	Marvel Studios	Nominated for 1 Oscar
2021	Venom: Let There Be Carnage	Columbia Pictures	
2021	Eternals	Marvel Studios	
2021	Spider-Man: No Way Home	Columbia Pictures / Marvel Studios	Nominated for 1 Oscar.
2022	Morbius	Columbia Pictures	
2022	Doctor Strange in the Multiverse of Madness	Marvel Studios	
2022	Thor: Love and Thunder	Marvel Studios	
2022	Black Panther: Wakanda Forever	Marvel Studios	Won 1 Oscar, nominated for 4 more
2023	Ant-Man and the Wasp: Quantumania	Marvel Studios	
2023	Guardians of the Galaxy Vol. 3	Marvel Studios	Nominated for 1 Oscar
2023	The Marvels	Marvel Studios	
2024	Madame Web	Columbia Pictures	
2024	Deadpool & Wolverine	Marvel Studios	
2024	Venom: The Last Dance	Columbia Pictures	
2024	Kraven the Hunter	Columbia Pictures	
2025	Captain America: Brave New World	Marvel Studios	
2025	Thunderbolts*	Marvel Studios	
2025	The Fantastic Four: First Steps	Marvel Studios	
2026	Spider-Man: Brand New Day	Columbia Pictures / Marvel Studios	
Upcoming
2026	Avengers: Doomsday	Marvel Studios	Post-production

=== Serials and short films ===
Year	Title	Studio(s)	Original release	Length	Notes
1944	Captain America	Republic Pictures	Theatrical	15 minutes per chapter	15-chapter serial; Marvel was then known as Timely Comics
1978	Spider-Man	Toei Company	Theatrical	24 minutes	Toei Manga Matsuri festival Summer 1978
2011	The Consultant	Marvel Studios / Ebeling Group	Blu-ray (Thor)	4 minutes	Marvel One-Shots
2011	A Funny Thing Happened on the Way to Thor's Hammer	Marvel Studios / Ebeling Group	Blu-ray (Captain America: The First Avenger)	4 minutes	Marvel One-Shots
2012	Item 47	Marvel Studios / M3 Creative	Blu-ray (The Avengers)	12 minutes	Marvel One-Shots
2013	Agent Carter	Marvel Studios	Blu-ray (Iron Man 3) and digital download	15 minutes	Marvel One-Shots
2014	All Hail the King	Marvel Studios	Blu-ray (Thor: The Dark World) and digital download	14 minutes	Marvel One-Shots
2016	Team Thor	Marvel Studios	Blu-ray (Captain America: Civil War)	4 minutes	Marvel One-Shots
2017	Team Thor: Part 2	Marvel Studios	Blu-ray (Doctor Strange)	5 minutes	Marvel One-Shots
2017	No Good Deed	20th Century Fox	Theatrically with Logan and free online (YouTube)	4 minutes	
2018	Team Darryl	Marvel Studios	Blu-ray (Thor: Ragnarok)	6 minutes	Marvel One-Shots
2019	Peter's To-Do List	Columbia Pictures / Marvel Studios	Blu-ray (Spider-Man: Far From Home)	3 minutes	
2021	Deadpool and Korg React	Maximum Effort	Online (YouTube)	4 minutes	

=== From Marvel imprints ===
Icon Comics

Year	Title	Studio(s)	Notes
2010	Kick-Ass	Marv Films / Plan B Entertainment	Distributed by Lionsgate Films in the U.S. and Canada and Universal Pictures in other territories
2013	Kick-Ass 2	Marv Films / Plan B Entertainment	Distributed by Universal Pictures
2014	Kingsman: The Secret Service	Marv Films / Cloudy Productions / Shangri-La Entertainment	Distributed by 20th Century Fox
2017	Kingsman: The Golden Circle	Marv Films / Cloudy Productions	Distributed by 20th Century Fox
2021	The King's Man	Marv Studios / Cloudy Productions	Distributed by 20th Century Studios; prequel to the Kingsman film series
2024	Argylle	Apple Original Films / Marv Studios / Cloudy Productions	Distributed by Universal Pictures and Apple Original Films; spin-off to the Kingsman film series
Upcoming
TBA	Stuntnuts: The Movie	Marv Studios / Zebbo Productions	Spin-offs to the Kick-Ass film series; Completed
TBA	Stuntnuts Does School Fight	Marv Studios / Zebbo Productions	Spin-offs to the Kick-Ass film series; Completed

Malibu Comics

Year	Title	Studio(s)	Notes
1997	Men in Black	Columbia Pictures / Amblin Entertainment / Parkes + MacDonald Productions	Won 1 Oscar, nominated for 2 more
2002	Men in Black II	Columbia Pictures / Amblin Entertainment / Parkes + MacDonald Productions	
2012	Men in Black 3	Columbia Pictures / Amblin Entertainment / P+M Image Nation / Hemisphere Media Capital	
2019	Men in Black: International	Columbia Pictures / Amblin Entertainment / Parkes + MacDonald Productions / Image Nation / Tencent Pictures	Spin-off of the Men in Black film series

==== Short films ====
Year	Title	Studio(s)	Notes
1993	Hardcase	Malibu Films	6-minute short film; VHS released by Wizard to promote the launch of the Ultraverse line
1993	Firearm	Malibu Films	35-minute short film; VHS released with Firearm comic book issue #0

=== Direct-to-video and television films ===
Year	Title	Studio(s)	Notes
1978	Dr. Strange	Universal Television	Pilot episode for an unproduced TV series
1979	Captain America	Universal Television	
1979	Captain America II: Death Too Soon	Universal Television	
1988	The Incredible Hulk Returns	New World Television / Bixby-Brandon Productions	Backdoor pilots for unproduced Thor and Daredevil series', respectively.
1989	The Trial of the Incredible Hulk	New World Television / Bixby-Brandon Productions	Backdoor pilots for unproduced Thor and Daredevil series', respectively.
1989	The Punisher	New World Pictures	Direct-to-video in U.S.; limited theatrical release internationally
1990	The Death of the Incredible Hulk	New World Television / Bixby-Brandon Productions	
1990	Captain America	21st Century Film Corporation	Co-produced by Jadran Film; direct-to-video in U.S.; limited theatrical release internationally
1994	The Fantastic Four	Constantin Film	Unreleased. Available in bootleg recordings and on YouTube.
1996	Generation X	New World Television	Pilot episode for an unproduced TV series
1998	Nick Fury: Agent of S.H.I.E.L.D.	20th Century Fox Television	Pilot episode for an unproduced TV series
2005	Man-Thing	Lionsgate Films / Artisan Entertainment	Television premiere in U.S. on the Syfy channel; limited theatrical release internationally; originally intended for direct-to-video and U.S. theatrical release.

==== Episodes as films ====
The following films were television series episodes released as theatrical feature films, television films, or direct-to-video movies.

Year	Title	Series	Studio(s)	Notes
1977	Spider-Man	The Amazing Spider-Man	Charles Fries Productions / Dan Goodman Productions / Columbia Pictures Television	Backdoor pilot episode of The Amazing Spider-Man TV series; limited theatrical release internationally
1977	The Incredible Hulk	The Incredible Hulk	Universal Television	Backdoor pilot episodes of The Incredible Hulk TV series; limited theatrical releases internationally
1977	Return of the Incredible Hulk	The Incredible Hulk	Universal Television	Backdoor pilot episodes of The Incredible Hulk TV series; limited theatrical releases internationally
1978	The Incredible Hulk: Married	The Incredible Hulk	Universal Television	First aired as a two-hour special; shown in two parts in syndication; titled The Bride of the Incredible Hulk for some video releases
1978	Spider-Man Strikes Back	The Amazing Spider-Man	Charles Fries Productions / Dan Goodman Productions / Columbia Pictures Television	Composite of the two-part episode Deadly Dust; limited theatrical release in some European and South American markets; VHS release in 1980.
1981	Spider-Man: The Dragon's Challenge	The Amazing Spider-Man	Charles Fries Productions / Dan Goodman Productions / Columbia Pictures Television	Composite of the two-part episode The Chinese Web; limited theatrical release in Australia, Brazil, and some European markets; VHS release in 1982.
2006	Blade: House of Chthon	Blade: The Series	New Line Television	Released on DVD in unrated expanded format with harsher language and frontal nudity
2017	Inhumans	Inhumans	ABC Studios / Marvel Television	The first two episodes of the series, Behold... The Inhumans and Those Who Would Destroy Us, debuted in IMAX theaters, and ran for two weeks before its television premiere on ABC; episodes were billed as "The First Chapter" of Inhumans: A Marvel Television Series; part of the Marvel Cinematic Universe

==== From Malibu Comics ====
Year	Title	Series	Studio(s)	Notes
1997	Nightman: World Premiere	Night Man	Alliance Films	Two-part pilot from Night Man series aired as television film

== Animated films ==
=== Feature films ===
==== Theatrical ====
Films produced for a theatrical release.

Year	Title	Studio(s)	Notes
2014	Big Hero 6	Walt Disney Animation Studios	CGI animation; won the Oscar for Best Animated Feature.
2018	Spider-Man: Into the Spider-Verse	Sony Pictures Animation	CGI animation; won the Oscar for Best Animated Feature.
2023	Spider-Man: Across the Spider-Verse	Sony Pictures Animation	CGI animation; nominated for the Oscar for Best Animated Feature.
Upcoming
2027	Spider-Man: Beyond the Spider-Verse	Sony Pictures Animation	CGI animation; in production

==== Direct-to-video and television ====
Films produced for a release to home video and television.

Year	Title	Studio(s)	Notes
1980	Dracula: Sovereign of the Damned	Toei Animation	Anime; television movies loosely based on The Tomb of Dracula and The Monster of Frankenstein, respectively.
1981	Kyoufu Densetsu Kaiki! Frankenstein	Toei Animation	Anime; television movies loosely based on The Tomb of Dracula and The Monster of Frankenstein, respectively.
2006	Ultimate Avengers	MLG Productions	Marvel Animated Features; distributed by Lions Gate Entertainment
2006	Ultimate Avengers 2	MLG Productions	Marvel Animated Features; distributed by Lions Gate Entertainment
2007	The Invincible Iron Man	MLG Productions	Marvel Animated Features; distributed by Lions Gate Entertainment
2007	Doctor Strange: The Sorcerer Supreme	MLG Productions	Marvel Animated Features; distributed by Lions Gate Entertainment
2008	Next Avengers: Heroes of Tomorrow	MLG Productions	Marvel Animated Features; distributed by Lions Gate Entertainment
2009	Hulk Versus	MLG Productions	Marvel Animated Features; distributed by Lions Gate Entertainment
2010	Planet Hulk	MLG Productions	Marvel Animated Features; distributed by Lions Gate Entertainment
2011	Thor: Tales of Asgard	MLG Productions	Marvel Animated Features; distributed by Lions Gate Entertainment
2013	Iron Man: Rise of Technovore	Madhouse	Marvel Anime; distributed by Sony Pictures Home Entertainment.
2013	Iron Man & Hulk: Heroes United	Marvel Animation	CGI and hand drawn animation
2014	Avengers Confidential: Black Widow & Punisher	Madhouse	Marvel Anime; distributed by Sony Pictures Home Entertainment
2014	Iron Man & Captain America: Heroes United	Marvel Animation	CGI and hand-drawn animation; digital release only
2015	Marvel Super Hero Adventures: Frost Fight!	Marvel Animation	Digital HD and on-demand; Christmas special.
2016	Hulk: Where Monsters Dwell	Marvel Animation	Digital HD and on-demand
2018	Marvel Rising: Secret Warriors	Marvel Animation	Television movie; first film of the Marvel Rising franchise; released simultaneously on Disney Channel and Disney XD

==== Episodes as films ====
Year	Title	Studio(s)	Notes
2017	Baymax Returns	Disney Television Animation	First episode of Big Hero 6: The Series; premiered on Disney XD and Disney Channel.

=== Short films ===
Year	Title	Studio(s)	Notes
2010	Marvel Super Heroes 4D (London)	Threshold Animation Studios	Part of an attraction at Madame Tussauds.
2012	Marvel Super Heroes 4D (New York)	Threshold Animation Studios	Part of an attraction at Madame Tussauds.
2013	Marvel Super Heroes 4D (Las Vegas)	Threshold Animation Studios	Part of an attraction at Madame Tussauds.
2013	Marvel Super Heroes 4D (Bali)	Threshold Animation Studios	Part of an attraction at Madame Tussauds.
2017	Marvel Super Heroes 4D (Sentosa)	Threshold Animation Studios	Part of an attraction at Madame Tussauds.
2019	Marvel Rising: Chasing Ghosts	Marvel Animation / Marvel Entertainment	Premiered on Marvel HQ YouTube Channel; 22 minutes
2019	Spider-Ham: Caught in a Ham	Sony Pictures Animation	Prequel to Spider-Man: Into the Spider-Verse; 4 minutes
2019	Marvel Rising: Heart of Iron	Marvel Animation / Marvel Entertainment	Premiered on Marvel HQ YouTube Channel; 44 minutes
2019	Marvel Rising: Battle of the Bands	Marvel Animation / Marvel Entertainment	Premiered on Marvel HQ YouTube Channel; 22 minutes
2019	Marvel Rising: Operation Shuri	Marvel Animation / Marvel Entertainment	Premiered on Marvel HQ YouTube Channel; 22 minutes
2019	Marvel Rising: Playing with Fire	Marvel Animation / Marvel Entertainment	Premiered on Marvel HQ YouTube Channel; 44 minutes
2023	The Spider Within: A Spider-Verse Story	Sony Pictures Animation	Prequel to Spider-Man: Across the Spider-Verse; 6 minutes

==== Lego short films ====
Year	Title	Studio(s)	Notes
2013	Lego Marvel Super Heroes: Maximum Overload	Arc Productions	Released on Disney.com
2015	Lego Marvel Super Heroes: Avengers Reassembled	Arc Productions	Released on Disney XD
2017	Lego Marvel Super Heroes - Guardians of the Galaxy: The Thanos Threat	The Lego Group	Released on Disney XD
2018	Lego Marvel Super Heroes - Black Panther: Trouble in Wakanda	The Lego Group	Released on Disney XD
2019	Lego Marvel Spider-Man: Vexed by Venom	The Lego Group	Released on Disney XD
2021	Lego Marvel Avengers: Loki in Training	The Lego Group	Released on Disney XD
2022	Lego Marvel Avengers: Time Twisted	The Lego Group	Released on YouTube
2023	Lego Marvel Avengers: Code Red	The Lego Group	Released on Disney+
2024	Lego Marvel Avengers: Mission Demolition	The Lego Group	Released on Disney+

==== From Icon Comics ====
Year	Title	Studio(s)	Notes
2017	#TBT to That Time Archer Met Kingsman	20th Television	Animated crossover short film between Kingsman and FX's Archer; 2 minutes

== Reception ==
=== Box office ===
Title	Distributor(s)	Release date (United States)	Budget (millions)	Box office gross			
Title	Distributor(s)	Release date (United States)	Budget (millions)	Opening weekend (North America)	North America	Other territories	Worldwide
Howard the Duck	Universal Pictures	August 1, 1986	$37	$5,070,136	$16,295,774	$21,667,000	$37,962,774
Blade	New Line Cinema	August 21, 1998	$45	$17,073,856	$70,087,718	$61,095,812	$131,183,530
X-Men	20th Century Fox	July 14, 2000	$75	$54,471,475	$157,299,717	$139,039,810	$296,339,527
Blade II	New Line Cinema	March 22, 2002	$54	$32,528,016	$82,348,319	$72,661,713	$155,010,032
Spider-Man	Sony Pictures	May 3, 2002	$139	$114,844,116	$403,706,375	$418,002,176	$821,708,551
Daredevil	20th Century Fox	February 14, 2003	$78	$40,310,419	$102,543,518	$76,636,200	$179,179,718
X2	20th Century Fox	May 2, 2003	$110	$85,558,731	$214,949,694	$192,761,855	$407,711,549
Hulk	Universal Pictures	June 20, 2003	$137	$62,128,420	$132,177,234	$113,183,246	$245,360,480
The Punisher	Lionsgate Films	April 16, 2004	$33	$13,834,527	$33,810,189	$20,889,916	$54,700,105
Spider-Man 2	Sony Pictures	June 30, 2004	$200	$88,156,227	$373,585,825	$415,390,628	$788,976,453
Blade: Trinity	New Line Cinema	December 8, 2004	$65	$16,061,271	$52,411,906	$76,493,460	$128,905,366
Elektra	20th Century Fox	January 14, 2005	$43	$12,804,793	$24,409,722	$32,271,844	$56,681,566
Fantastic Four	20th Century Fox	July 8, 2005	$100	$56,061,504	$154,696,080	$175,883,639	$330,579,719
X-Men: The Last Stand	20th Century Fox	May 26, 2006	$210	$102,750,665	$234,362,462	$224,997,093	$459,359,555
Ghost Rider	Sony Pictures	February 16, 2007	$110	$45,388,836	$115,802,596	$112,935,797	$228,738,393
Spider-Man 3	Sony Pictures	May 4, 2007	$258	$151,116,516	$336,530,303	$554,341,323	$890,871,626
Fantastic Four: Rise of the Silver Surfer	20th Century Fox	June 15, 2007	$130	$58,051,684	$131,921,738	$169,991,393	$301,913,131
Iron Man	Paramount Pictures	May 2, 2008	$140	$98,618,668	$318,412,101	$266,762,121	$585,174,222
The Incredible Hulk	Universal Pictures	June 13, 2008	$150	$55,414,050	$134,806,913	$128,620,638	$263,427,551
Punisher: War Zone	Lionsgate Films	December 5, 2008	$35	$4,271,451	$8,050,977	$2,049,059	$10,100,036
X-Men Origins: Wolverine	20th Century Fox	May 1, 2009	$150	$85,058,003	$179,883,157	$193,179,707	$373,062,864
Iron Man 2	Paramount Pictures	May 7, 2010	$200	$128,122,480	$312,433,331	$311,500,000	$623,933,331
Thor	Paramount Pictures	May 6, 2011	$150	$65,723,338	$181,030,624	$268,295,994	$449,326,618
X-Men: First Class	20th Century Fox	June 3, 2011	$160	$55,101,604	$146,408,305	$207,215,819	$353,624,124
Captain America: The First Avenger	Paramount Pictures	July 22, 2011	$140	$65,058,524	$176,654,505	$193,915,269	$370,569,774
Ghost Rider: Spirit of Vengeance	Sony Pictures	February 17, 2012	$57	$22,115,334	$51,774,002	$80,789,928	$132,563,930
The Avengers	Walt Disney Studios Motion Pictures	May 4, 2012	$220	$207,438,708	$623,357,910	$895,455,078	$1,518,812,988
The Amazing Spider-Man	Sony Pictures	July 3, 2012	$230	$62,004,688	$262,030,663	$495,900,000	$757,930,663
Iron Man 3	Walt Disney Studios Motion Pictures	May 3, 2013	$200	$174,144,585	$409,013,994	$805,797,258	$1,214,811,252
The Wolverine	20th Century Fox	July 26, 2013	$120	$53,113,752	$132,550,960	$282,271,394	$414,828,246
Thor: The Dark World	Walt Disney Studios Motion Pictures	November 8, 2013	$170	$85,737,841	$206,362,140	$438,209,262	$644,571,402
Captain America: The Winter Soldier	Walt Disney Studios Motion Pictures	April 4, 2014	$170	$95,023,721	$259,766,572	$454,497,695	$714,264,267
The Amazing Spider-Man 2	Sony Pictures	May 2, 2014	$255	$91,608,337	$202,853,933	$506,128,390	$708,982,323
X-Men: Days of Future Past	20th Century Fox	May 23, 2014	$200	$90,823,660	$233,921,534	$513,941,241	$747,862,775
Guardians of the Galaxy	Walt Disney Studios Motion Pictures	August 1, 2014	$170	$94,320,883	$333,176,600	$440,152,029	$773,328,629
Big Hero 6	Walt Disney Studios Motion Pictures	November 7, 2014	$165	$56,215,889	$222,527,828	$435,300,000	$657,827,828
Avengers: Age of Ultron	Walt Disney Studios Motion Pictures	May 1, 2015	$250	$191,271,109	$459,005,868	$946,397,826	$1,405,403,694
Ant-Man	Walt Disney Studios Motion Pictures	July 17, 2015	$130	$57,225,526	$180,202,163	$339,109,802	$519,311,965
Fantastic Four	20th Century Fox	August 7, 2015	$120	$25,685,737	$56,117,548	$111,765,333	$167,882,881
Deadpool	20th Century Fox	February 12, 2016	$58	$132,434,600	$363,070,709	$420,042,270	$783,112,979
Captain America: Civil War	Walt Disney Studios Motion Pictures	May 6, 2016	$250	$179,139,142	$408,084,349	$745,220,146	$1,153,304,495
X-Men: Apocalypse	20th Century Fox	May 27, 2016	$178	$65,769,562	$155,442,489	$388,491,616	$543,934,105
Doctor Strange	Walt Disney Studios Motion Pictures	November 4, 2016	$165	$85,058,311	$232,641,920	$445,076,475	$677,718,395
Logan	20th Century Fox	March 3, 2017	$97	$88,411,916	$226,277,068	$390,518,532	$616,795,600
Guardians of the Galaxy Vol. 2	Walt Disney Studios Motion Pictures	May 5, 2017	$200	$146,510,104	$389,813,101	$473,942,950	$863,756,051
Spider-Man: Homecoming	Sony Pictures	July 7, 2017	$175	$117,027,503	$334,201,140	$545,965,784	$880,166,924
Inhumans	IMAX Entertainment	September 1, 2017	—N/a	$1,500,000	$1,521,787	$1,330,495	$2,852,282
Thor: Ragnarok	Walt Disney Studios Motion Pictures	November 3, 2017	$180	$122,744,989	$315,058,289	$538,918,837	$853,977,126
Black Panther	Walt Disney Studios Motion Pictures	February 16, 2018	$200	$202,003,951	$700,059,566	$646,853,595	$1,346,913,161
Avengers: Infinity War	Walt Disney Studios Motion Pictures	April 27, 2018	$316	$257,698,183	$678,815,482	$1,369,544,272	$2,048,359,754
Deadpool 2	20th Century Fox	May 18, 2018	$110	$125,507,153	$324,591,735	$460,455,185	$785,046,920
Ant-Man and the Wasp	Walt Disney Studios Motion Pictures	July 6, 2018	$162	$75,812,205	$216,648,740	$406,025,399	$622,674,139
Venom	Sony Pictures	October 5, 2018	$100	$80,255,756	$213,515,506	$642,569,655	$856,085,161
Spider-Man: Into the Spider-Verse	Sony Pictures	December 14, 2018	$90	$35,363,376	$190,241,310	$185,299,521	$375,540,831
Captain Marvel	Walt Disney Studios Motion Pictures	March 8, 2019	$152	$153,433,423	$426,829,839	$701,444,955	$1,128,274,794
Avengers: Endgame	Walt Disney Studios Motion Pictures	April 26, 2019	$356	$357,115,007	$898,471,864	$2,044,181,180	$2,942,653,044
Dark Phoenix	20th Century Fox	June 7, 2019	$200	$32,828,348	$65,845,974	$186,597,000	$252,442,974
Spider-Man: Far From Home	Sony Pictures	July 2, 2019	$160	$92,579,212	$390,532,085	$741,395,911	$1,131,927,996
The New Mutants	20th Century Studios	August 28, 2020	$67	$7,037,017	$23,855,569	$25,316,935	$49,172,504
Black Widow	Walt Disney Studios Motion Pictures	July 9, 2021	$200	$80,366,312	$183,651,665	$195,979,696	$379,631,351
Shang-Chi and the Legend of the Ten Rings	Walt Disney Studios Motion Pictures	September 3, 2021	$150	$75,388,688	$224,543,292	$207,700,000	$432,243,292
Venom: Let There Be Carnage	Sony Pictures	October 1, 2021	$110	$90,033,210	$213,550,366	$288,500,000	$502,050,366
Eternals	Walt Disney Studios Motion Pictures	November 5, 2021	$200	$85,021,497	$164,870,234	$237,194,665	$402,064,899
Spider-Man: No Way Home	Sony Pictures	December 17, 2021	$200	$260,138,569	$814,115,070	$1,107,732,041	$1,921,847,111
Morbius	Sony Pictures	April 1, 2022	$75–83	$39,005,895	$73,865,530	$93,595,431	$167,460,961
Doctor Strange in the Multiverse of Madness	Walt Disney Studios Motion Pictures	May 6, 2022	$200	$187,420,998	$411,331,607	$544,444,197	$955,775,804
Thor: Love and Thunder	Walt Disney Studios Motion Pictures	July 8, 2022	$200	$144,165,107	$343,256,830	$417,671,251	$760,928,081
Black Panther: Wakanda Forever	Walt Disney Studios Motion Pictures	November 11, 2022	$250	$181,339,761	$453,829,060	$405,378,853	$859,207,913
Ant-Man and the Wasp: Quantumania	Walt Disney Studios Motion Pictures	February 17, 2023	$200	$106,109,650	$214,506,909	$261,566,271	$476,073,180
Guardians of the Galaxy Vol. 3	Walt Disney Studios Motion Pictures	May 5, 2023	$250	$118,414,021	$358,995,815	$486,559,962	$845,555,777
Spider-Man: Across the Spider-Verse	Sony Pictures	June 2, 2023	$100	$120,663,589	$381,593,754	$309,304,156	$690,897,910
The Marvels	Walt Disney Studios Motion Pictures	November 10, 2023	$375	$46,110,859	$84,500,223	$121,636,602	$206,136,825
Madame Web	Sony Pictures	February 14, 2024	$80	$15,335,860	$43,817,106	$56,681,658	$100,498,764
Deadpool & Wolverine	Walt Disney Studios Motion Pictures	July 26, 2024	$200	$211,435,291	$636,745,858	$701,327,524	$1,338,073,382
Venom: The Last Dance	Sony Pictures	October 25, 2024	$120	$51,012,404	$139,728,533	$337,128,915	$476,857,448
Kraven the Hunter	Sony Pictures	December 13, 2024	$110	$11,001,109	$25,024,746	$36,960,862	$61,985,608
Captain America: Brave New World	Walt Disney Studios Motion Pictures	February 14, 2025	$180	$88,842,603	$200,500,001	$214,601,576	$415,101,577
Thunderbolts*	Walt Disney Studios Motion Pictures	May 2, 2025	$180	$74,300,608	$190,274,328	$192,162,589	$382,436,917
The Fantastic Four: First Steps	Walt Disney Studios Motion Pictures	July 25, 2025	$200	$117,644,828	$274,286,610	$247,572,118	$521,858,728
Spider-Man: Brand New Day	Sony Pictures	July 31, 2026	$225	$360,091,572	$959,059,276	$1,564,668,977	$2,523,728,253
Total			$11,935	$7,561,381,269	$20,674,846,133	$30,564,979,325	$51,239,831,340
Average			$150.128	$90,815,960	$248,489,816	$367,128,152	$615,618,043

=== Critical and public response ===
Critical and public response of films based on Marvel Comics publications
Film	Critical		Public
Film	Rotten Tomatoes	Metacritic	CinemaScore
Howard the Duck	14% (158 reviews)	28 (21 reviews)	B−
The Punisher (1989)	25% (16 reviews)	63 (4 reviews)	—N/a
Captain America	16% (19 reviews)	—N/a	—N/a
The Fantastic Four	33% (13 reviews)	—N/a	—N/a
Blade	59% (114 reviews)	47 (25 reviews)	A−
X-Men	82% (176 reviews)	64 (33 reviews)	A−
Blade II	57% (150 reviews)	52 (28 reviews)	B+
Spider-Man	90% (249 reviews)	73 (38 reviews)	A−
Daredevil	42% (229 reviews)	42 (35 reviews)	B
X2	85% (249 reviews)	68 (37 reviews)	A
Hulk	63% (239 reviews)	54 (40 reviews)	B−
The Punisher (2004)	30% (169 reviews)	33 (36 reviews)	B+
Spider-Man 2	93% (276 reviews)	83 (41 reviews)	A−
Blade: Trinity	24% (167 reviews)	38 (30 reviews)	B+
Elektra	11% (164 reviews)	34 (35 reviews)	B
Man-Thing	14% (7 reviews)	—N/a	—N/a
Fantastic Four (2005)	28% (217 reviews)	40 (35 reviews)	B
X-Men: The Last Stand	56% (235 reviews)	58 (38 reviews)	A−
Ghost Rider	28% (137 reviews)	35 (20 reviews)	B
Spider-Man 3	62% (261 reviews)	59 (40 reviews)	B+
Fantastic Four: Rise of the Silver Surfer	38% (173 reviews)	45 (33 reviews)	B
Iron Man	94% (278 reviews)	79 (38 reviews)	A
The Incredible Hulk	68% (238 reviews)	61 (38 reviews)	A−
Punisher: War Zone	29% (111 reviews)	30 (24 reviews)	B−
X-Men Origins: Wolverine	37% (255 reviews)	40 (39 reviews)	B+
Iron Man 2	72% (299 reviews)	57 (40 reviews)	A
Thor	77% (292 reviews)	57 (40 reviews)	B+
X-Men: First Class	86% (294 reviews)	65 (38 reviews)	B+
Captain America: The First Avenger	80% (274 reviews)	66 (43 reviews)	A−
Ghost Rider: Spirit of Vengeance	18% (118 reviews)	34 (22 reviews)	C+
The Avengers	91% (363 reviews)	69 (43 reviews)	A+
The Amazing Spider-Man	71% (339 reviews)	66 (42 reviews)	A−
Iron Man 3	79% (327 reviews)	62 (44 reviews)	A
The Wolverine	71% (259 reviews)	61 (46 reviews)	A−
Thor: The Dark World	67% (289 reviews)	54 (44 reviews)	A−
Captain America: The Winter Soldier	90% (311 reviews)	70 (48 reviews)	A
The Amazing Spider-Man 2	50% (313 reviews)	53 (50 reviews)	B+
X-Men: Days of Future Past	90% (328 reviews)	75 (44 reviews)	A
Guardians of the Galaxy	91% (337 reviews)	76 (53 reviews)	A
Big Hero 6	90% (229 reviews)	74 (39 reviews)	A
Avengers: Age of Ultron	75% (371 reviews)	66 (49 reviews)	A
Ant-Man	83% (338 reviews)	64 (44 reviews)	A
Fantastic Four (2015)	9% (260 reviews)	27 (40 reviews)	C−
Deadpool	85% (345 reviews)	65 (49 reviews)	A
Captain America: Civil War	90% (430 reviews)	75 (52 reviews)	A
X-Men: Apocalypse	47% (345 reviews)	52 (48 reviews)	A−
Doctor Strange	89% (385 reviews)	72 (49 reviews)	A
Logan	93% (428 reviews)	77 (51 reviews)	A−
Guardians of the Galaxy Vol. 2	85% (422 reviews)	67 (47 reviews)	A
Spider-Man: Homecoming	92% (396 reviews)	73 (51 reviews)	A
Thor: Ragnarok	93% (437 reviews)	74 (51 reviews)	A
Black Panther	96% (526 reviews)	88 (55 reviews)	A+
Avengers: Infinity War	85% (486 reviews)	68 (54 reviews)	A
Deadpool 2	83% (417 reviews)	66 (51 reviews)	A
Ant-Man and the Wasp	87% (445 reviews)	70 (56 reviews)	A−
Venom	31% (365 reviews)	35 (46 reviews)	B+
Spider-Man: Into the Spider-Verse	97% (399 reviews)	87 (50 reviews)	A+
Captain Marvel	79% (545 reviews)	64 (56 reviews)	A
Avengers: Endgame	94% (551 reviews)	78 (57 reviews)	A+
Dark Phoenix	22% (385 reviews)	43 (52 reviews)	B−
Spider-Man: Far From Home	91% (454 reviews)	69 (55 reviews)	A
The New Mutants	36% (137 reviews)	43 (20 reviews)	—N/a
Black Widow	79% (463 reviews)	68 (58 reviews)	A−
Shang-Chi and the Legend of the Ten Rings	92% (344 reviews)	71 (52 reviews)	A
Venom: Let There Be Carnage	58% (283 reviews)	49 (48 reviews)	B+
Eternals	48% (416 reviews)	52 (62 reviews)	B
Spider-Man: No Way Home	93% (429 reviews)	71 (60 reviews)	A+
Morbius	15% (287 reviews)	35 (55 reviews)	C+
Doctor Strange in the Multiverse of Madness	73% (464 reviews)	60 (65 reviews)	B+
Thor: Love and Thunder	64% (448 reviews)	57 (64 reviews)	B+
Black Panther: Wakanda Forever	84% (450 reviews)	67 (62 reviews)	A
Ant-Man and the Wasp: Quantumania	46% (414 reviews)	48 (61 reviews)	B
Guardians of the Galaxy Vol. 3	82% (409 reviews)	64 (63 reviews)	A
Spider-Man: Across the Spider-Verse	95% (385 reviews)	86 (60 reviews)	A
The Marvels	63% (377 reviews)	50 (57 reviews)	B
Madame Web	10% (269 reviews)	26 (51 reviews)	C+
Deadpool & Wolverine	77% (421 reviews)	56 (58 reviews)	A
Venom: The Last Dance	40% (225 reviews)	41 (47 reviews)	B–
Kraven the Hunter	15% (160 reviews)	35 (41 reviews)	C
Captain America: Brave New World	46% (368 reviews)	42 (56 reviews)	B–
Thunderbolts*	88% (382 reviews)	68 (53 reviews)	A–
The Fantastic Four: First Steps	86% (408 reviews)	65 (54 reviews)	A–
Spider-Man: Brand New Day	90% (439 reviews)	66 (56 reviews)	A

=== Marvel imprints ===
Icon Comics

Title	Distributor(s)	Release date (United States)	Rotten Tomatoes	Metacritic	CinemaScore	Budget (in millions)	Worldwide box office
Kick-Ass	Lions Gate Entertainment	April 16, 2010	76% (268 reviews)	66 (38 reviews)	B	$30	$96,188,903
Kick-Ass 2	Universal Pictures	August 16, 2013	32% (211 reviews)	41 (35 reviews)	B+	$28	$60,795,985
Kingsman: The Secret Service	20th Century Fox	February 13, 2015	75% (263 reviews)	60 (50 reviews)	B+	$81	$414,351,546
Kingsman: The Golden Circle	20th Century Fox	September 22, 2017	51% (308 reviews)	44 (44 reviews)	B+	$104	$410,902,662
The King's Man	20th Century Studios	December 22, 2021	42% (159 reviews)	44 (37 reviews)	B+	$100	$125,897,478
Argylle	Universal Pictures; Apple Original Films	February 2, 2024	32% (305 reviews)	35 (56 reviews)	C+	$200	$96,221,061

Malibu Comics

Title	Distributor(s)	Release date (United States)	Rotten Tomatoes	Metacritic	CinemaScore	Budget (in millions)	Worldwide box office
Men in Black	Columbia Pictures	July 2, 1997	92% (89 reviews)	71 (22 reviews)	B+	$90	$589,390,539
Men in Black II	Columbia Pictures	July 3, 2002	39% (197 reviews)	49 (37 reviews)	B+	$140	$441,818,803
Men in Black 3	Columbia Pictures	May 25, 2012	68% (251 reviews)	58 (38 reviews)	B+	$215	$624,026,776
Men in Black: International	Columbia Pictures	June 14, 2019	23% (318 reviews)	38 (51 reviews)	B	$110	$253,890,701

== See also ==
- List of television series based on Marvel Comics publications
- List of films based on DC Comics publications
- List of Marvel Cinematic Universe films
  - Marvel One-Shots
- Sony's Spider-Man Universe
- List of unproduced Marvel Comics adaptations
- List of unproduced 20th Century Fox projects based on Marvel Comics
- List of unproduced television projects based on Marvel Comics
- List of Marvel Cinematic Universe television series (Marvel Television)
- List of Marvel Cinematic Universe television series (Marvel Studios)
- List of radio dramas based on Marvel Comics publications
- List of unproduced film projects based on Marvel Comics
  - List of unproduced films based on Marvel Comics imprints publications
  - List of unproduced Marvel Cinematic Universe projects
