= List of unproduced 20th Century Fox projects based on Marvel Comics =

This is a list of unmade and unreleased projects based on Marvel Comics produced by 20th Century Fox. Fox formerly held the film production rights to Nick Fury, the X-Men, the Fantastic Four, Daredevil, Elektra and Deadpool. Between 2000 and 2020, multiple films and television series were produced as part of the X-Men film series, in addition to a Daredevil and Elektra film (2003–05), two Deadpool films (2016–18) and three Fantastic Four films (2005–07; 2015).

In October 2012, the Daredevil film rights reverted to Disney after several unsuccessful attempts to reboot the film franchise, thereby giving Marvel Studios creative control over the character and associated characters such as Elektra. An unrelated Daredevil television series was produced by Marvel Television between 2015 and 2018 for Netflix, set in the studio's Marvel Cinematic Universe (MCU) franchise, followed by the sequel series Daredevil: Born Again (2025–present) for Disney+ . In March 2019, The Walt Disney Company closed its merger with 21st Century Fox, acquiring multiple entertainment licenses formerly held by the firm, including the film rights to the X-Men, Fantastic Four and Deadpool, which likewise reverted to Marvel Studios. Various Marvel-based films at various stages of development were placed "on hold" and eventually canceled altogether by Disney following the acquisition, with any future projects featuring the characters now being produced by Marvel Studios and integrated into the MCU where applicable.

== Films ==
=== Daredevil films ===
==== Daredevil 2 ====
Feige had stated on potential future Daredevil films, as "there are many more stories to be told with old Hornhead and we'd love to tell them someday". Avi Arad has also said that a sequel will begin development once the rights go from 20th Century Fox to Marvel Studios. Director Mark Steven Johnson showed interest in returning to direct with the Born Again storyline, as well as suggesting Mr. Fear as a possible villain. During 2004, Ben Affleck shot a cameo role for the spin-off film, Elektra, at the request of Daredevil co-star Jennifer Garner. That October, Affleck stated he would only return in the lead role if Fox would renegotiate to tell the darker stories of Daredevil, and showed interest in a Kevin Smith graphic novel which included Mysterio, as well as the Born Again storyline. However, in November 2006, Affleck said that he would never reprise the role, having felt "by playing a superhero in Daredevil, I have inoculated myself from ever playing another superhero... Wearing a costume was a source of humiliation for me and something I wouldn't want to do again soon". Despite this, Affleck would later sign on to portray the DC superhero, Batman / Bruce Wayne, in Batman v Superman: Dawn of Justice.

In July 2006, Michael Clarke Duncan showed interest in returning for the role of the Kingpin, but said that he would not be willing to gain weight as he felt "comfortable" being down to 270 pounds. However, he jokingly showed willingness to change his mind if he was offered $20 million. Duncan suggested that the character is portrayed as having been training a lot in jail in order to become faster in combat against Daredevil, also working as a way to fit his weight loss into the story. Duncan would later go on to reprise his role as the Kingpin in an episode of the animated series: Spider-Man: The New Animated Series.

==== Daredevil reboot ====
In August 2008, Jason Statham expressed interest in appearing as Daredevil in the future. Statham requested to be given a chance because of his love for the character. Frank Miller was positive of Statham's opinion. Later in October, Fox executive Tom Rothman said that they were thinking of rebooting Daredevil, expressing that they needed someone who has a creative vision inspired by director Chris Nolan. By February 2010, Fox and New Regency were looking to develop the reboot with News Corp., with Peter Chernin producing and David Scarpa writing the script. In 2011, filmmaker David Slade was attached to direct the reboot, but he later dropped out due to other obligations. Fringe writer and producer Brad Caleb Kane was hired to pen the Slade-directed film.

On September 3, 2012, Duncan died, precluding him from reprising his role as Kingpin. By that time, the screen rights to Daredevil and associated characters would revert to Disney and Marvel if a new film did not enter production by October 30, 2012. In early August, Fox scrambled to find a replacement for David Slade, who dropped out of the director's chair due to scheduling conflicts. The studio briefly met with Joe Carnahan for the job, but Carnahan said on Twitter that his pitch, described as a hard-boiled '70s thriller, had gone up in smoke. Several sources commented that Fox had given up on the reboot, and were prepared to let the rights revert to Marvel and their parent company, The Walt Disney Company. Kevin Feige confirmed in April 2013 that the rights for Daredevil returned to Marvel Studios and Disney, opening the possibility of including the character into the Marvel Cinematic Universe. An original Netflix Daredevil television series, premiered on the streaming service in April 2015, with English actor Charlie Cox in the title role.

=== Fantastic Four films ===
==== Fantastic Four: Rise of the Silver Surfer sequel ====
A sequel to the June 2007 film Fantastic Four: Rise of the Silver Surfer was planned. The main four cast of the other two films originally signed a three-movie deal, with 20th Century Fox and Julian McMahon also signed for a third film. Michael Chiklis was told Ben Grimm's relationship with Alicia Masters would have had a greater focus in a third film, and Jessica Alba expressed interest in introducing Franklin Richards, while Beau Garrett wished to return as Nova. Tim Story said he was interested in directing a third and fourth film. Writer Don Payne said that while he had not discussed a sequel with the studio, he was interested in working with more Fantastic Four characters, like Inhumans, the Skrulls, the Puppet Master, and Annihilus and the Negative Zone. Story told IGN in an interview that he would like to have the Black Panther in the film with Djimon Hounsou as the character. As Fantastic Four: Rise of the Silver Surfer performed worse at the box office than the first film, Fox was unsure of the series' future, and no script was in development. In March 2008, Chris Evans revealed: "I'm pretty sure we won't do another one. I'm assuming that one is a closed book". The series was eventually rebooted in 2015.

==== Fantastic Four (2015) sequel ====
In March 2014, before Fantastic Four began filming, Fox announced plans for a sequel with a scheduled release date of July 14, 2017. Fox then rescheduled the release for June 2, 2017, with War for the Planet of the Apes taking its place in the July 14, 2017, slot. It changed the release date again to June 9, 2017, to be two weeks after Star Wars: The Last Jedi's initial scheduled release date of May 26, 2017. Initially, it was intended for both Galactus and Silver Surfer to be shown in a post-credits scene of the film destroying an entire planet to tease a possible sequel. Both Galactus and Silver Surfer were removed from the final version of the film, postponing their reveals, due to budgetary reasons. Due to Fantastic Four's poor box office performance, negative reviews, and poor home media sales, Pamela McClintock of The Hollywood Reporter said that it "throws into question whether Fox will move ahead with a sequel". Phil Hoad of The Guardian said it would "be interesting" to see if Fox proceeds with a sequel and if it keeps the "gritty-on-paper" tone, noting that if Fox did not produce a sequel or a reboot until 2022, the film rights would revert to Marvel Studios.

Despite the performance, it was reported in September 2015 that Fox still planned to produce a sequel, with Simon Kinberg working on the project. Drew McWeeny of HitFix said that while a sequel might not be produced in time for the 2017 release date, Fox would likely attempt to salvage the franchise, working with Josh Trank's defined vision and adding adjustments to it. While Kinberg affirmed his intent to make a sequel, Kate Mara said that a sequel looked unlikely, despite expressing interest in reprising her role as Sue Storm. In September, Tommy Wiseau expressed enthusiasm in directing a sequel, having personal admiration for the film. In November, the sequel was removed from Fox's release schedule. Kinberg reaffirmed his intent to make another Fantastic Four film with the same cast the following year in May. Later that month, Toby Kebbell stated he had no interest in reprising his role as Dr. Doom if a sequel were to happen. Both Miles Teller and Kate Mara said that they were open to returning for a sequel.

Kinberg was asked by Collider of whether he will make another Fantastic Four film. In his response: "I have no idea. I think the truth is we would not do another Fantastic Four movie until it was ready to be made. One of the lessons we learned on that movie is we want to make sure to get it 100% right, because we will not get another chance with the fans". Toby Kebbell stated he would only be interested in returning to the role of Doctor Doom if he joined the Marvel Cinematic Universe: "Truth is, Doom is an incredible bad guy. They just keep trying to force him into the Fantastic Four...Doom is a monster, but you know my Doom was not, so there's that".

Stan Lee (co-creator of the Fantastic Four) also expressed interest in the Fantastic Four, as well as the X-Men, returning to Marvel Studios: "We should have all of our characters under Marvel. Remind me on my way home to do something about that. We'll do our best". However, Marvel Studios' Kevin Feige said that there were no plans of adding the Fantastic Four to the Marvel Cinematic Universe at that time. Matthew Vaughn also expressed interest in directing a new version of Fantastic Four himself as an apology. Concept artist Alexander Lozano revealed that Trank's iteration of the Fantastic Four were to make cameo appearances in Tim Miller's take on Deadpool 2, but were cut most likely due to the disappointing reception of the film and to cut back on the self-deprecating humor.

==== Fantastic Four: Rise of the Silver Surfer spin-off ====
In 2007, Fox hired J. Michael Straczynski to write the screenplay for a spin-off film. Straczynski said his script is a sequel, but will also delve into the Surfer's origins. In mid-2009, Straczynski expressed doubts that spin-off would be produced. In this continuity, the Surfer's origins and powers are similar to those of his comic-book incarnation, in that he agrees to become Galactus' herald in return for the safety of his home world and the woman he loved. Also, if the Surfer is separated from his board, he becomes weaker; in addition, the board also serves as a beacon for Galactus. Director Tim Story said he created Galactus as a cosmic cloud so a future Silver Surfer spin-off film would be unique, as the character had yet to appear in comic-book form. Film writer J. Michael Straczynski stated that "you don't want to sort of blow out something that big and massive for one quick shot in the first movie". New development surfaced when writer Brian K. Vaughan was attached to a Silver Surfer script.

==== Doctor Doom ====
In July 2017, a Doctor Doom solo film was in development with Noah Hawley attached to direct. In an interview with ScreenGeek, Mads Mikkelsen had expressed interest in playing the character, having previously auditioned for Doctor Doom for the 2015 film. Dan Stevens was said to be involved with the film. Hawley stated in June 2018 that the script was almost finished, but that there was "uncertainty" about whether it would be filmed due to his upcoming film Lucy in the Sky and the fact that Disney plans to acquire Fox. In March 2019, Hawley revealed that he was still unsure about whether he would be continuing the project, as it had not been officially greenlit, but that he spoke to Kevin Feige about it. Hawley planned a more purist take on the film focused on the character, describing the film as a "kind of Cold War, geopolitical movie" that would have taken place in the fictional Eastern European nation of Latveria, which Doom rules with an iron fist as a monarch. After 10 years of isolation, Doom would invite a female journalist to visit for the purpose of sharing a message to the rest of the world. The project was ultimately canned in August according to Hawley.

=== X-Men/Fantastic Four/Daredevil crossover film ===
In 2010, Zack Stentz and Ashley Edward Miller were to co-write a film featuring the X-Men, the Fantastic Four, Daredevil, and Deadpool. The plot revolved around a superhero registration act, pitting various characters on opposite sides of the conflict similar to the Civil War story arc. Paul Greengrass had been approached to serve as director, though scheduling conflicts placed the project indefinitely on hold. Warren Ellis worked separately on another draft of the script.

=== Taskmaster film ===
In 2010, Joe Carnahan and producer Alex Young discussed making a feature film around Taskmaster for 21st Century Fox, but it never came to fruition.

== Television series ==
=== X-Men series ===
==== Generation X ====
Generation X is a FOX television pilot directed by Jack Sholder that aired on February 20, 1996. It is based on the Marvel Comics comic-book series of the same name, a spin-off of the X-Men franchise. It was produced by New World Entertainment and Marvel Entertainment Group. After talks of a TV series stalled, just before the release, the TV special was testing the waters for a series of TV movies instead, with nothing coming out since.

==== Hellfire ====
In October 2015, a live action television series titled Hellfire was under development by 20th Century Fox Television and Marvel Television with an early 2017 air date, but as of July 2016, the project was no longer moving forward.

==== Untitled Deadpool animated series ====
In May 2017, FXX placed a series order for an animated series based on Deadpool, to be co-produced by Marvel Television, FX Productions, and ABC Signature Studios. Donald Glover and his brother Stephen Glover were announced as showrunners, executive producers, and writers for the series. FXX later decided not to move forward with the series due to creative differences. Stephen Glover later admitted that the "creative difference" in question involved an episode revolving around Taylor Swift which FXX stated was the "last straw" and that they wanted to give Rick and Morty "a run for its money".

=== Nick Fury: Agent of S.H.I.E.L.D. ===
Nick Fury: Agent of S.H.I.E.L.D. was a pilot episode from 1998 based on the Marvel Comics character Nick Fury. The pilot was broadcast for BBC One and FOX on May 26, 1998. Directed by Rod Hardy, the film stars David Hasselhoff as Fury, a retired super spy who is approached to return to duty to take down the terrorist organization Hydra, who threaten to attack Manhattan with a pathogen they have reconstituted known as Death's Head. Lisa Rinna plays Contessa Valentina "Val" Allegra de Fontaine, and Sandra Hess plays Andrea von Strucker / Viper. The film was met with a mixed to poor reception, resulting in the studio not picking up the series. A different Nick Fury TV series was in development, around 2001. Nick Fury: Agent of S.H.I.E.L.D. was given a DVD release on September 30, 2008.

=== Powers ===
In 2009, Brian Michael Bendis confirmed plans to develop a Powers television show on FX as well as his involvement as the writer of the pilot for the show. In February 2011, a greenlit pilot of the show scripted by Charles H. Eglee was announced as a co-production by Sony Pictures Television and FX Networks. Charles S. Dutton became the first cast member in May when he signed on to play Captain Cross. In June, filming in Chicago was scheduled to start within a few weeks. The following week, Lucy Punch was cast as Deena Pilgrim. Katee Sackhoff had campaigned for the part. Although FX was rumored to be courting Kyle Chandler for the part of Walker, Jason Patric was cast in the part. Later in June, Carly Foulkes was cast as RetroGirl and Bailee Madison was cast as Calista. Filming began in Chicago in early July and ended in early August. That November, FX announced that it would reshoot the Powers pilot. Bendis tweeted at the time that the reshoots were planned for January and were are all about tone and clarity. In April 2012, more scripts were ordered and writing continued, but more reshoots and recasting were being discussed by the network. Work on this project halted, when in March 2014, Powers was revealed to become the first original television series from the PlayStation Network, with a different cast and writers. The new series premiered on March 10, 2015.

=== Punisher ===
In October 2011, FOX was developing The Punisher as an hour-long TV series. The project was eventually cancelled in May 2012. A different series centered around the Punisher was released onto Netflix in 2017.

=== Thor ===
There was another attempt at an animated Thor TV series in 2000 for FOX.

== See also ==
- List of unproduced films based on Marvel Comics imprints publications
- List of television series based on Marvel Comics publications
- List of unproduced Marvel Cinematic Universe projects
- List of unproduced television projects based on Marvel Comics
- List of unproduced film projects based on Marvel Comics
