= List of unproduced films based on Marvel Comics imprints publications =

This is a list of unproduced films based on comics published by Marvel at some point under one of their imprints. Several of these titles are creator owned and have since been published by other companies. Some of these productions were, or still are, in development hell. Films that have not provided significant production announcements within at least a year would be considered in development limbo until further announcements are released.

== CrossGen ==
=== Ruse ===
In January 2009, Siavash Farahani announced he had written a Ruse film script for Disney with Sam Raimi directing the project.

=== Way of the Rat ===
In May 2011, Disney and CrossGen were developing a Way of the Rat film based on the comic book series of the same name.

== Epic Comics ==
=== Alien Legion ===
In November 2009, Carl Potts' Alien Legion screenplay was optioned by producer Jerry Bruckheimer and The Walt Disney Company. In 2010, Bruckheimer exercised the option, buying the screenplay and assigning Game of Thrones show runner David Benioff to do a rewrite.

In 2023, the rights were picked up by Warner Bros., with Tim Miller slated to direct.

=== Crash Ryan ===
In March 2015, a film adaptation of Crash Ryan was announced to be in development, with Ryan Heppe producing.

=== Elfquest ===
In July 2008, Warner Bros. announced its intention to bring the Elfquest saga to the big screen, with Rawson Marshall Thurber serving as writer and director. The format (live action, CGI, or traditional animation) is yet unknown. However, it was confirmed on Elfquest's official Facebook page that Warner Bros. ultimately canceled the project; the ostensible reason is that Warner Bros. didn't want the film competing with The Hobbit: An Unexpected Journey. In 2013, there were rumours of recapping the project on behalf of the producers of a fan-made trailer which appeared.

==== Animated Elfquest video series ====
In the early 1990s, an ad for a multi-volume animated adaptation of Elfquest appeared in the comic. A few issues later, the Pinis told readers they'd withdrawn from the deal, and that readers should ask for refunds. Those who didn't eventually received a 50-minute VHS tape from Abby Lou Entertainment, copyright 1992. Covering the first volume of the book, it consists of color still images taken straight from the comic, some minor animation, and spoken dialogue.

== Icon Comics ==
=== Empress ===
A film adaptation of Empress was announced to be in development for Netflix in July 2018, as part of the first slate of films adapted from comics under Mark Millar's imprint Millarworld, with Joe Roth and Jeff Kirschenbaum producing, and Lindsey Beer writing the script.

=== Incognito ===
In May 2010, Incognito was optioned for a film by 20th Century Fox, with Robert Schenkkan penciled in as the screenwriter. The film was picked up by Columbia Pictures, with 10 Cloverfield Lane screenwriter Daniel Casey writing the script and Fede Álvarez directing.

=== Kick-Ass 3 ===
In April 2012, while Kick-Ass 2 was still in pre-production Mark Millar stated that a third film was also planned, but in June 2013, he revealed that it was not confirmed and would be dependent on how successful the second film was. Later the same month he further elaborated that if it went ahead, the third film would be the final installment: "Kick-Ass 3 is going to be the last one... I told Universal this, and they asked me, 'What does that mean?' I said, 'It means that this is where it all ends'. They said, 'Do they all die at the end?' I said, 'Maybe' – because this is a realistic superhero story... if someone doesn't have a bulletproof vest like Superman, and doesn't have Batman's millions, then eventually he is going to turn around the wrong corner and get his head kicked in or get shot in the face. So Kick-Ass needs to reflect that. There has to be something dramatic at the end; he cannot do this for the rest of his life". Moretz has shown interest in returning for a third installment and would also be interested in exploring Hit-Girl's dark side: "I want to see something we haven't seen yet. Now we've seen who Mindy is, now we've seen who Hit-Girl is, I think we need to meld the characters together and have Mindy become Hit-Girl and Hit-Girl become Mindy. Maybe her natural hair has a streak of purple in it, maybe she really does go kind of crazy and go a bit darker since she lost her father. I would only do the third one if it were logical. It needs to be a good script and a director, probably Matthew (Vaughn). The third film needs to fully wrap up the series and has to be a good note to end on".

After the release of Kick-Ass 2, Millar stated that the third film is "in the pipeline". While at a press junket for Godzilla in May 2014, Taylor-Johnson stated that he was still up for a third film but he was not contracted for it. In the same month, Christopher Mintz-Plasse revealed he had not heard anything but expressed doubt that a third film would happen due to the second installment's disappointing box office performance. In June, Chloë Grace Moretz echoed her co-stars' sentiments when asked about Kick-Ass 3, expressing the hope for the film. She also cited the second film's lower box office gross as the key obstacle to the third chapter being produced and suggested file sharing was a factor: "The hard thing is if fans want a third movie, they've got to go buy the ticket to go see the movie. It was like the second most pirated movie of the year, so if you want a movie to be made into a second, a third, a fourth, and a fifth, go buy a ticket. Don't pirate it". In June 2018, Matthew Vaughn announced his intention to set up Marv Studios, under which banner he will produce a reboot of the Kick-Ass series.

==== Hit-Girl prequel ====
In August 2014, Chloë Grace Moretz reiterated her previous statements and said "sadly, I think I'm done with Hit-Girl". In January 2015, Millar revealed to IGN that there was a planned Hit-Girl film with Gareth Evans directing but was cancelled. In February, Matthew Vaughn, who directed the first film, spoke optimistically about a "Hit-Girl" prequel: "If that happens, I'm pretty sure I can persuade Aaron and Chloe to come back and finish the story of Kick-Ass". Vaughn reiterated this in June about working on a prequel on how Hit-Girl and Big Daddy became superheroes and plans to make Kick-Ass 3 after.

=== Nemesis ===
The rights to make a Nemesis film were optioned by 20th Century Fox. Tony Scott was set to direct it before his death, in conjunction with his Scott Free production company. In August 2010, Joe Carnahan was working on the screenplay for the film. Carnahan was confirmed as the director a few years later, writing the script with his brother Matthew Carnahan. In December, Carnahan announced via Twitter that he was working on the screenplay for the film. In October 2013, Mark Millar reportedly had seen the script for Nemesis and had given praise to Joe and Matthew's take on his comic book character, stating that the film would be "massive". Millar later said that Carnahan's script was complete in February 2015, and that if Kingsman: The Secret Service did well at the box office, the film would start filming that year. In August, Warner Bros acquired the rights to adapt the film. In May 2021, Millar revealed that Emerald Fennell had written the latest draft of the screenplay.

=== Powers ===
In 2001, Sony Pictures had optioned the comic series for a film production, commissioning a writers' room. After development seemed to have stalled, Sony shifted focus in creating a TV series based on the comic instead.

=== Superior ===
In April 2014, 20th Century Fox picked up the rights to a feature film based on the comic series Superior. Fox hired Brandon and Phillip Murphy in early 2016 to write the film's script, Matthew Vaughn Tarquin Pack producing the film. Mark Millar tweeted that he would like to see John Cena cast as Superior.

=== Argylle sequels and Kingsman crossover / shared universe ===
In July 2021, it was announced that Argylle was intended to be the first of a franchise of at least three films. In March 2022, it was confirmed that the first film will be followed by two sequels to complete a film trilogy. In October 2023, Vaughn confirmed plans to develop sequels, while stating that the second film would be a prequel, as "the first Argylle novel", exploring the origins of Argylle becoming a spy; while the third movie would follow additional installments. He also announced his plans to create a larger spy-themed universe through his Marv Studios, with that universe being interconnected and comprising the Kingsman franchise, the Argylle films, and an unnamed third franchise. He intended to have the new upcoming films in each series culminate in a crossover in the future. On the film's release, its mid-credits scene, after displaying a younger Argylle (portrayed by Louis Partridge) being recruited by Kingsman, displays a note onscreen stating, "'Argylle: Book One – The Movie' coming soon". In February 2024, Vaughn confirmed that the prequel installment is being developed with Louis Partridge starring as Argylle (as portrayed by Cavill) in his formative years. Variety noted that for a traditional studio release, Argylle would need to gross around $500 million worldwide to break even. The film grossed a worldwide total of $96.1 million, putting future plans for Argylle on hold.

== Malibu Comics ==
=== Men in Black 4 ===
Both Will Smith and Tommy Lee Jones have said that they would "consider" appearing in a fourth Men in Black film. Jones said it would be "easy to pick up where we left off. We know what we are doing, we know how to do it. It's just a hell of a lot of fun". In July 2012, Columbia chief executive Doug Belgrad said: "We're very pleased with the financial performance of Men in Black 3, and we believe it is an ongoing franchise. We're going to do [another one], but we don't have clarity yet on how it should be done". Director Barry Sonnenfeld said: "Will's kind of really smart, but as I said, kind of really annoying, too much energy. When he would get too rambunctious, I would tell him save that for Men in Black 4, Will is out and [his son] Jaden Smith is in ... if we continue on this path, it won't be released until 2032 but it will be damn good". Will Smith said: "Jaden is already 13 years old, so he's at that mythological boys age, you know–it's time for his bro-mitzvah. So he's right at that place ... He's ready to test me, so he can't come anywhere near my movies right now!" In early 2013, Oren Uziel was writing a Men in Black 4 screenplay for Sony Pictures. In September 2015, series producers Walter Parkes and Laurie MacDonald stated the series would be rebooted as a trilogy, most likely without the involvement of Will Smith and Tommy Lee Jones.

=== MIB 23 ===
In December 2014, it was revealed that Sony was planning a crossover between Men in Black and Jump Street. The news was leaked after Sony's system was hacked and then confirmed by the directors of the films, Phil Lord and Christopher Miller during an interview about it. James Bobin was announced as director in 2016. In April, the film was announced and revealed to be titled, MIB 23. However, development has since appeared to have ceased. A spin-off of Men in Black 3 titled Men in Black: International, starring Chris Hemsworth and Tessa Thompson, included Emma Thompson as Agent O. It was released in June 2019.

=== Prime ===
In October 2002, Marvel Studios announced a movie deal for Prime with Universal Pictures, after securing the rights to The Hulk. In 2003, Marvel released an earnings report listing a Prime film as "to be determined".

== Razorline ==
=== Ectokid ===
After the cancellation of Razorline, Clive Barker sold the film rights of his comic series Ectokid to Nickelodeon Movies and Paramount Pictures, in 2001. The film was set to have Barker, Don Murphy, and Nickelodeon's Albie Hecht and Julia Pistor as producers, Joe Daley as executive producer, and Karen Rosenfelt overseeing development at Paramount.

== See also ==
- List of unproduced film projects based on Marvel Comics
  - List of unproduced television projects based on Marvel Comics
- List of films based on Marvel Comics publications
  - List of Marvel Cinematic Universe films
- List of films based on comics
- List of films based on English-language comics
