= Marvel Super Heroes 4D =

2010 animated 4D film

Madame Tussauds London
- Status: Operating
- Opening date: May 31, 2010

Madame Tussauds New York
- Status: Operating
- Opening date: April 26, 2012

Madame Tussauds Singapore
- Status: Operating
- Opening date: December 14, 2017

Ride statistics
- Attraction type: 4D film
- Theme: Marvel Super Heroes
- London website: Official website
- New York website: Official website
- Singapore website: Official website

Marvel Super Heroes 4D is an animated 4D film that was launched at Madame Tussauds London on May 31, 2010. On April 26, 2012, an updated version of the film with a different plot was also opened at Madame Tussauds New York. On December 14, 2017, a version of the film was also opened at Madame Tussauds Singapore.

A new version of the film with a plot set in Las Vegas was opened at Madame Tussauds Las Vegas on November 20, 2013. Another version Marvel Super Heroes 4D: Avengers Battle in Bali was launched in Bali on November 22, 2013.

== London version ==
=== Plot ===
Iron Man, Ms. Marvel, Hulk, Wolverine, Captain America and Spider-Man are invited to Buckingham Palace to receive awards from the Queen in recognition for their services.

But instead the superheroes have to fight huge robots that attack London. Later the guardian of the palaces exposes himself as Doctor Doom. All together they defeat him and when Iron Man falls to ground he is saved by Ms. Marvel.

=== Reception ===
Scifibulletin: "Verdict: With some inventive use of "traditional" 3D as well, all it's lacking is a Stan Lee cameo for a Marvel nostalgia tour to be complete. Recommended. 8/10"

Bleeding Cool: "The effects are largely well judged – air jets at floor and head level from all directions, water sprays, and an unexpected claw-jab through the seat back from Wolverine all feature in addition to the traditional shaky floor."

Expert Reviews: "The movie's plot is cleverly contrived too, literally bringing the action into the auditorium by the end. It's all a great finale to a classic London attraction."

== New York version ==
=== Plot ===
After an attack on Stark Industries by Dr. Doom; Iron Man, Spider-Man, Captain America, Thor and The Hulk unite as The Avengers to defeat Dr. Doom, Loki and their army of robots.

== Cast ==
- Eric Loomis as Iron Man
- Tom Kenny as Spider-Man
- Fred Tatasciore as Hulk
- Steve Blum as Wolverine
- Brian Bloom as Captain America
- Jennifer Hale as Ms. Marvel
- Graham McTavish as Loki
- Paul Dobson as Doctor Doom
- Rick D. Wasserman as Thor
- Grey DeLisle as Computer Voice
