= List of unproduced Marvel Comics adaptations =

Marvel Comics logo

This is a list of unmade and unreleased film, television, and video game adaptations based on characters and concepts from Marvel Comics.

== Video games ==
=== Questprobe featuring The X-Men ===
In the early 1980s, an 8-bit video game crossover with the X-Men and Questprobe was in development from Adventure International and Scott Adams, but was cancelled when the company went out of business in 1986.

=== The Incredible Hulk ===
There was going to be an Atari 2600 game based on the Hulk published by Parker Brothers, but it was cancelled due to the video game crash of 1983.

=== X-Women ===
In 1995, a video game titled X-Women was a planned follow up to Sega's 1995 Genesis title X-Men 2: Clone Wars. The story would have focused on the female members of the X-Men. Development was cancelled for unknown reasons.

=== Incredible Hulk 2 ===
In 1995, several gaming magazines listed a game titled Incredible Hulk 2 in lists of upcoming games. Outside of these listings, the game has never been mentioned or referred to, and it is believed that it may have been reworked into The Incredible Hulk: The Pantheon Saga, as the game was referred to as "Incredible Hulk 2" in a French Sega Saturn magazine.

=== Marvel 2099: One Nation Under Doom ===
In 1996, a video game for the PlayStation and PC titled Marvel 2099: One Nation Under Doom started development by Mindscape. The game was intended to be a 2D side-scroller loosely inspired by the "One Nation Under Doom" story from the Doom 2099 comic series. The game was canceled as a result of financial issues and layoffs at Mindscape.

=== Spider-Man: The Venom Factor ===
A sequel to the PC game Spider-Man: The Sinister Six entered development around 1996 by Saffire. For many years, little was known about the game beyond a mention on the website for Spider-Man: The Sinister Six that listed a sequel titled Spider-Man: The Venom Factor as coming soon. Eventually, additional details, such as the box art and gameplay screenshots, were discovered on archived versions of Saffire's website. It is unknown why the game was canceled, as it was suggested on Saffire's website that it had been finished. According to Computer Gaming World #154, the game was originally intended to release in spring 1997.

=== X-Men: Mind Games ===
A 2D sidescroller based on the X-Men, titled X-Men: Mind Games, was in development by Sega for the 32X. It was canceled for unknown reasons. The prototype was leaked online in 2009

=== Ghost Rider ===
A pitch for a Ghost Rider game on the PlayStation, developed by Neversoft Entertainment was turned down in 1995 after executives believed it should be 3D rather than a 2D sidescroller.

A Ghost Rider game was eventually released in 2007, based on the live action film.

=== Fantastic Four (Sega Saturn) ===
A Sega Saturn version of Fantastic Four was planned but was canceled in 1997, following development issues with the PlayStation release.

=== X-Men: Ashes of the Apocalypse ===
In 1997, an X-Men game titled X-Men: Ashes of the Apocalypse was announced in an advertisement in The Uncanny X-Men #350, with New Wave Entertainment attached as its developer. In 2024, former New Wave Entertainment head Michael Mendheim revealed that the game never entered development and was instead a proposal intended to generate interest that was ultimately unsuccessful.

=== Daredevil: The Man Without Fear ===
In the early 2000s, 5000ft Inc. began development on a PlayStation 2 game titled Daredevil: The Man Without Fear. Originally planned as a low-budget title, it later expanded into an open-world brawler with a larger budget following the announcement of the live-action Daredevil film, with Xbox and PC added as platforms. After issues with the open-world engine, the game was reworked into a linear third-person brawler. During development, Sony requested additions and changes that Marvel did not agree with, and after delays caused it to miss its planned tie-in with the film, several staff members left. Marvel ultimately refused to approve the game, believing the developers had used too many of Sony's ideas, leading to its cancellation.

Footage of a prototype dated July 2003 was uploaded online in 2020, and a playable build of the PS2 version dated March 22, 2004 was leaked online by an anonymous developer in 2023.

=== Elektra ===
Following her appearance in Daredevil: The Man Without Fear, an Elektra spin-off game was planned; however, the cancellation of the Daredevil game, combined with the underperformance of the 2003 Daredevil film, led to Marvel becoming less interested in Daredevil related media. The development issues surrounding Daredevil: The Man Without Fear reportedly caused a $5 million loss for publisher Encore, which subsequently left the video game industry following its cancellation. While Encore's plans for an Elektra game were abandoned, the possibility of one remained under consideration until the Elektra film's even worse performance convinced Marvel not to pursue a game with a different developer.

=== The Invincible Iron Man ===
Following X2: Wolverine's Revenge, GenePool Software began development on an Iron Man-themed game for the Xbox, PlayStation 2, and PC. The reason for the game's cancellation is unknown, but it is believed to have been partly caused by delays to the then-in-development Iron Man film. Additionally, Z-Axis was developing another Iron Man game at the same time, also with Activision, and reportedly continued development after GenePool's version was canceled, suggesting Activision may have decided not to have two Iron Man games in development.

In 2024, some screenshots and footage of a prototype demo were shared online by programmer Kevin Edwards.

=== Untitled Iron Man game ===
In November 2003, IGN reported that Z-Axis was working with Activision and developing games based on Iron Man and the X-Men. While X-Men: The Official Game was released in 2006, the Iron Man game was never released and was quietly canceled without ever being officially announced. At the same time, GenePool Software was developing its own Iron Man game, also with Activision, which was unexpectedly canceled despite positive reception from executives. Z-Axis's Iron Man game reportedly continued development for about a year after GenePool's was canceled before being canceled itself for unknown reasons.

=== Marvel: Chaos ===
A 3D arena fighter titled Marvel: Chaos was canceled a few months after it was first shown at E3 2007 when Electronic Arts (EA) shut down its Chicago studio.

=== Ultimate Spider-Man II ===
A sequel to Ultimate Spider-Man had entered development with a planned release date of December 2007; however, it was canceled before production began due to the original game failing to meet sales expectations, with Treyarch instead focusing on the Spider-Man 3 game.

The story was set to explore the family dynamic between Harry and Norman Osborn, with Ultimate Green Goblin being the second playable character and Harry turning into the Hobgoblin during the climax.

In 2021, some concept art was shared online by concept artist Ian Schofeld, and an early test animation was leaked online in 2025.

=== Untitled multiplayer game ===
After a planned sequel to Ultimate Spider-Man was canceled, Treyarch began exploring ideas for a multiplayer Marvel game. The game did not progress very far in development before Activision acquired the James Bond license and Treyarch developed 007: Quantum of Solace instead. Little is known about the game outside of a comment from former concept artist Ian Hosfeld, who described their ideas as "along the lines of the original Secret Wars."

=== Spider-Man Classic ===
A sequel to Spider-Man: Web of Shadows titled Spider-Man Classic was in development by Shaba Studios but was canceled when Activision shut down Shaba in 2009.

=== Spider-Man 4 ===
Similar to the previous films in the trilogy, Spider-Man 4 was intended to receive a video game tie-in in 2011. The game was canceled alongside the film when it was announced in 2010 that Sony was rebooting the series instead of moving forward with the sequel. In 2019, the Wii version was discovered and was uploaded on the Internet Archive, with the Xbox 360 version being leaked in 2021.

=== The Avengers ===
In 2012, THQ had plans for an Avengers video game that would have been inspired by the "Secret Invasion" storyline but it was canceled due to their bankruptcy. After the game's cancellation, Ubisoft acquired the Avengers license and reworked some of the concepts into Marvel Avengers: Battle for Earth.

In September 2026, the game was discovered to be one of many titles included in a list of leaked Steam achievements, suggesting that it may be back in development.

=== Untitled Iron Man game ===
In 2022, Avalanche Studios co-founder Christofer Sundberg revealed that the studio had begun developing an Iron Man game in the early 2010s. The game was in development for two years before being canceled in 2012 due to "company politics". Disney had requested that Avalanche shorten the game's development timeline and rapidly expand its team, which Sundberg believed would have put significant strain on the studio.

In August 2026, footage of the game from a PlayStation 3 development kit was leaked online.

=== Project Cosmic ===
A LEGO game based on the Guardians of the Galaxy, known internally as Project Cosmic, had been in development by TT Games for around a year and a half before being canceled for unknown reasons.

=== Marvel: World of Heroes ===
In September 2022, a trailer for an AR app titled Marvel: World of Heroes, developed by Niantic, was released online with an estimated release window of 2023. The game was canceled in June 2023, following a corporate restructuring and layoffs that caused Niantic's Los Angeles studio to be shut down.

=== Spider-Man: The Great Web ===
In March 2024, details of an online multiplayer spin-off of the Marvel's Spider-Man series titled Spider-Man: The Great Web were leaked online as part of a ransomware attack on developers Insomniac Games. The game would have been based on the "Spider-Verse" story arc and allowed players to play as different multiverse variants of Spider-Man. The game was canceled for unknown reasons.

=== Black Panther ===
A Black Panther game developed by Cliffhanger Games was canceled in 2025 when EA shut down the studio.

=== Marvel's Spider-Man 2 Venom DLC ===
In April 2026, Miles Morales's voice actor from Marvel's Spider-Man, Nadji Jeter, suggested that a Venom-themed DLC for Spider-Man 2 had been canceled following Tony Todd's death in 2024. The DLC has not been mentioned or confirmed elsewhere, and Jeter's subsequent comments regarding a standalone Venom spin-off were later debunked, suggesting that his claims about the DLC may also be inaccurate.

=== Blade ===
A Blade game developed by Arkane Studios was first announced at The Game Awards 2023 in December 2023. After several years without any public updates, reports indicated that the game had been delayed from a planned late 2026 release window and had gone over budget. Additionally, it was also reported that Microsoft was considering canceling the game and selling Arkane Studios as part of layoffs at Xbox. In October 2026, it was reported that Microsoft planned to shut down Arkane if it could not find a buyer by mid-December.

== See also ==
- List of unproduced DC Comics projects
- List of unproduced Dark Horse Comics projects
- List of unproduced Image Comics projects
