= List of unproduced film projects based on Marvel Comics =

Unproduced projects based on Marvel Characters

Marvel Comics logo

This is a list of unmade and unreleased film projects based on Marvel Comics. Some of these productions were, or still are, in development hell. Projects that have not provided significant production announcements within at least a year are considered to be in development limbo until further announcements are released. The following includes live-action and animated film productions.

== The Fantastic Four ==
In 1983, German producer Bernd Eichinger met with Marvel Comics' Stan Lee at Lee's Los Angeles home to explore obtaining an option for a movie based on the Fantastic Four. The option was not available until three years later, when Eichinger's Neue Constantin film company obtained it for a price the producer called "not enormous" and which has been estimated to be $250,000. Despite some interest from Warner Bros. and Columbia Pictures, budget concerns precluded any production, and with the option scheduled to expire on December 31, 1992, Neue Constantin asked Marvel for an extension. With none forthcoming, Eichinger planned to retain his option by producing a low-budget Fantastic Four film, reasoning, he said in 2005, "They didn't say I had to make a big movie." In September 1992, he teamed with B-movie specialist Roger Corman, who agreed to produce the film on a $1 million budget.

Production began on December 28, 1992, under music video director Oley Sassone. Storyboards were drawn by artist Pete Von Sholly. The 21-day or 25-day production was shot on the Concorde Pictures sound stage in Venice, California, as well as in Agoura, California for a spacecraft-crash scene, the Loyola Marymount University campus for a lab-explosion scene, and the former Pacific Stock Exchange building in downtown Los Angeles for team-meeting scenes. Costume designer Réve Richards recalled in 1993 going to Golden Apple Comics on Melrose Avenue in Los Angeles to buy Fantastic Four comic books for research, and, upon explaining his task, "[T]hese people in the store just swarmed me and said, 'You are going to be faithful to it?' And I told them, 'This is why I am buying these books.'" Paul Ahern was hired as weapons consultant, and Scott Billups for computer visual effects. The special-effects makeup was by John Vulich and Everett Burrell of Optic Nerve. Stuntman Carl Ciarfalio, who wore a rubber suit to portray the monstrous superhero Thing, worked with actor Michael Bailey Smith, who played the Thing's human self, Ben Grimm, so that their mannerisms would match. During the months of post-production, music composers David and Eric Wurst personally contributed $6,000 to finance a 48-piece orchestra for the soundtrack.

A 1993 magazine article gave a tentative release date of Labor Day weekend 1993. During that summer, trailers ran in theaters and on the video release of Corman's Carnosaur. The cast members hired a publicist, at their own expense, to help promote the film at a clips-screening at the Shrine Auditorium in Los Angeles and at San Diego Comic-Con. By this time, the world premiere was announced to take place at the Mall of America in Minneapolis, Minnesota, on January 19, 1994, with proceeds from the event earmarked for the charities Ronald McDonald House and Children's Miracle Network. However, the premiere was halted, the actors received a cease and desist order on all promotion from the producers and the studio confiscated the negatives. Eichinger then informed Sassone that the film would not be released. Speculation arose that the film had never been intended for release, but had gone into production solely as a way for Eichinger to retain rights to the characters; Stan Lee said in 2005 that this was indeed the case, insisting, "The movie was never supposed to be shown to anybody," and adding that the cast and crew had been left unaware. Corman and Eichinger dismissed Lee's claims, with the former stating in the same article, "We had a contract to release it, and I had to be bought out of that contract" by Eichinger. Eichinger, also in that article, calls Lee's version of events "definitely not true. It was not our [original] intention to make a B movie, that's for sure, but when the movie was there, we wanted to release it." He said future Marvel film impresario Avi Arad, at this point, in 1993, a Marvel executive, "...calls me up and says, 'Listen, I think what you did was great, it shows your enthusiasm for the movie and the property, and ... I understand that you have invested so-and-much, and Roger has invested so-and-much. Let's do a deal.' Because he really didn't like the idea that a small movie was coming out and maybe ruining the franchise.... So he says to me that he wants to give me back the money that we spent on the movie and that we should not release it.

In 2002, Arad recalled that, while on a trip to Puerto Rico in 1993, a fan noticing Arad's Fantastic Four shirt expressed excitement over the film's upcoming premiere, of which Arad said he was unaware. Concerned how the low-budget film might cheapen the brand, he said he purchased the film "for a couple of million dollars in cash" and, not having seen it, ordered all prints destroyed in order to prevent its release. Eichinger continued negotiations to produce a big-budget adaptation, speaking with directors including Chris Columbus, Peyton Reed, and Peter Segal. After pre-production briefly went underway in 1996, Eichinger and his company, by that time called Constantin Film, began production in 2004 of Fantastic Four with an estimated $90 million budget. Following that film's 2005 release, Eichinger and Constantin produced a $130 million sequel, Fantastic Four: Rise of the Silver Surfer (2007). Although never officially released to the general public, but exhibited once on May 31, 1994, The Fantastic Four has been subject to bootleg recordings. The film is available to watch on YouTube and Dailymotion.

== Mongrel: The Legend of Copperhead ==
In the early 1980s, famed filmmaker George Romero was attached to direct a feature film adaptation of the Marvel Comics character Copperhead titled Mongrel: The Legend of Copperhead. At the time, it was planned to be the first film adaptation of a Marvel Comics property. However, the project was ultimately cancelled due to a lack of funds from Marvel. Romero would go on to work on other projects, while the first Marvel Comics film adaptation would be Howard the Duck, released in 1986.

== Dazzler ==
In the mid-1980s, screenwriter Gary Goddard was commissioned to write a script for a film based on Dazzler to star Bo Derek. The project was ultimately abandoned when temperamental director John Derek was brought on board, leading to investors backing out. Dazzler eventually made her film debut in Dark Phoenix, portrayed by Halston Sage.

== Cannon Films' Spider-Man ==
The low box office performance of 1983's Superman III made feature-film adaptations of comic book properties a very low priority in Hollywood until the 1990s. In 1985, after a brief option on Spider-Man by Roger Corman expired, Marvel Comics optioned the property to Cannon Films. Cannon chiefs Menahem Golan and his cousin Yoram Globus agreed to pay Marvel $225,000 over the five-year option period, plus a percentage of any film's revenues. However, the rights would revert to Marvel if a film was not made by April 1990.

Tobe Hooper, then preparing both Invaders from Mars and The Texas Chainsaw Massacre 2, was mooted as director. Golan and Globus misunderstood the concept of the character and instructed writer Leslie Stevens, creator of The Outer Limits, to write a treatment reflecting their misconception. In Stevens' story, a corporate scientist intentionally subjects ID-badge photographer Peter Parker to radioactive bombardment, transforming him into a hairy, suicidal, eight-armed monster. This human tarantula refuses to join the scientist's new master-race of mutants, battling a succession of mutations kept in a basement laboratory.

Unhappy with this perceived debasement of his comic book creation, Marvel's Stan Lee pushed for a new story and screenplay, written for Cannon by Ted Newsom and John Brancato. The variation on the origin story had Otto Octavius as a teacher and mentor to a college-aged Peter Parker. The cyclotron accident, which "creates" Spider-Man, also deforms the scientist into Doctor Octopus and results in his mad pursuit of proof of the Fifth Force. "Doc Ock" reconstructs his cyclotron and causes electromagnetic abnormalities, anti-gravity effects, and bilocation, which threatens to engulf New York City and the world. Joseph Zito, who had directed Cannon's successful Chuck Norris film Invasion U.S.A., replaced Tobe Hooper. The new director hired Barney Cohen to rewrite the script. Cohen, creator of TV's Sabrina the Teenage Witch and Forever Knight, added action scenes, a non-canonical comic for the villain, gave Doc Ock the catch phrase, "Okey-dokey", and altered his goal from the Fifth Force to a quest for anti-gravity. Producer Golan (using his pen name "Joseph Goldman") then made a minor polish to Cohen's rewrite. Zito scouted locations and studio facilities in both the U.S. and Europe, and oversaw storyboard breakdowns supervised by Harper Goff. Cannon planned to make the film on the then-substantial budget of between $15 and $20 million.

While no casting was finalized, Zito expressed interest in actor/stunt man Scott Leva, who had posed for Cannon's promotional photos and ads, and made public appearances as Spider-Man for Marvel. The up-and-coming actor Tom Cruise was also discussed for the leading role. Zito considered Bob Hoskins as Doc Ock. Stan Lee expressed his desire to play Daily Bugle editor J. Jonah Jameson. Lauren Bacall and Katharine Hepburn were considered for Aunt May, Peter Cushing as a sympathetic scientist, and Adolph Caesar as a police detective. With Cannon finances siphoned by the expensive Superman IV: The Quest for Peace and Masters of the Universe, the company slashed the proposed Spider-Man budget to under $10 million. Director Zito opted out, unwilling to make a compromised Spider-Man. The company commissioned low-budget rewrites from writers Shepard Goldman, Don Michael Paul, and finally Ethan Wiley, and penciled in company workhorse Albert Pyun as director, who also made script alterations.

Scott Leva was still associated with the character through Marvel (he had appeared in photo covers of the comic), and read each draft. Leva commented, "Ted Newsom and John Brancato had written the script. It was good, but it needed a little work. Unfortunately, with every subsequent rewrite by other writers, it went from good to bad to terrible." Due to Cannon's assorted financial crises, the project shut down after spending about $1.5 million on the project. In 1989, Pathé, owned by corrupt Italian financier Giancarlo Parretti, acquired the overextended Cannon. The filmmaking cousins parted, Globus remaining associated with Pathé, Golan leaving to run 21st Century Film Corporation, keeping several properties (including Spider-Man) instead of a cash buy-out. He also extended his Spider-Man option with Marvel up to January 1992.

Golan shelved the low-budget rewrites and attempted to finance an independent production from the original big-budget script, already budgeted, storyboarded, and laid out. At Cannes in May 1989, 21st Century announced a September start date, with ads touting the script by "Barney Cohen, Ted Newsom & John Brancato and Joseph Goldman." As standard practice, Golan pre-sold the unmade film to raise production funds, with television rights bought by Viacom and home video rights by Columbia Pictures, which wanted to establish a studio franchise. Stephen Herek was attached as director at this point. Golan submitted this "new" screenplay to Columbia in late 1989 (actually the 1985 script with an adjusted "1989" date) and the studio requested yet another rewrite. Golan hired Frank LaLoggia, who turned in his draft but grew disenchanted with the 21st Century. Neil Ruttenberg was hired for one more draft, which was also "covered" by script readers at Columbia. Columbia's script analysts considered all three submissions "essentially the same story." A tentative production deal was set. In 1990, Stan Lee said, "21st Century [is] supposed to do Spider-Man and now they're talking to Columbia and the way it looks now, Columbia may end up buying Spider-Man from 21st Century."

== Wolverine and the X-Men ==
Around 1989, Stan Lee and Chris Claremont entered into talks with Carolco Pictures and Lightstorm Entertainment to make a film adaptation of the X-Men comic book series, with James Cameron as producer, Kathryn Bigelow as director and Gary Goldman as writer. Bob Hoskins was slated to star as Wolverine and Angela Bassett was attached to star as Storm. Claremont also contacted Marvel Comics editor-in-chief Jim Shooter to revive the character of Jean Grey due to the character's demise in The Dark Phoenix Saga comic book storyline. However, the project entered into development hell when Lee piqued Cameron's interest on the long planned Spider-Man film and after the defunction of Carolco Pictures. A different film was released in 2000 with a different studio, 20th Century Fox, and Bryan Singer as director.

== Silver Surfer ==
In 1989, Erik Fleming, then a film student from the USC School of Cinematic Arts, and Robert Letterman approached Marvel Studios and Constantin Film's producer Bernd Eichinger to ask permission to make a short film featuring the Silver Surfer, as a proof of concept for the use of CGI in creating a realistic silver colored human figure. Supervised by Steven Robiner, this 5-minute short film, completed in 1991 and premiered at First Look USC Film Festival on September 21, 1993, led to significant interest from major studios in a feature-length Silver Surfer project. However, in 1992, Quentin Tarantino, fresh from his critical success with Reservoir Dogs, had come to Constantin Productions with a Silver Surfer script, but was turned away. Andrew Kevin Walker wrote a different script for 20th Century Fox in 2000, but nothing ever came of this, either.

== Early abandoned Iron Man scripts ==
In April 1990, Universal Studios bought the rights to develop Iron Man for the big screen, with Stuart Gordon to direct a low-budget film based on the property. By February 1996, 20th Century Fox had acquired the rights from Universal. In January 1997, Nicolas Cage expressed interest in portraying the character, while in September 1998, Tom Cruise expressed interest in producing as well as starring in an Iron Man film. Jeff Vintar and Iron Man co-creator Stan Lee co-wrote a story for Fox, which Vintar adapted into a screenplay. It included a new science-fiction origin for the character and featured MODOK as the villain. Over 10 years later, MODOK was included in early drafts of Captain America: The Winter Soldier as the main villain, with Peter Dinklage being the first choice for the role, but the character was cut from the final draft and replaced by Alexander Pierce. Tom Rothman, President of Production at Fox, credited the screenplay with finally making him understand the character. In May 1999, Jeffrey Caine was hired to rewrite Vintar and Lee's script. Fox sold the rights to New Line Cinema the following December, reasoning that although the Vintar/Lee script was strong, the studio had too many Marvel superheroes in development, and "we can't make them all." In 1999, Quentin Tarantino was also linked to a live-action Iron Man film, as director and writer. By July 2000, the film was being written for New Line by Ted Elliott, Terry Rossio, and Tim McCanlies. McCanlies' script used the idea of a Nick Fury cameo to set up his own film. In June 2001, New Line entered talks with Joss Whedon, a fan of the character. and in December 2002, McCanlies had turned in a completed script. In December 2004, the studio attached director Nick Cassavetes to the project for a target 2006 release. Screenplay drafts were written by Alfred Gough, Miles Millar, and David Hayter, and pitted Iron Man against his father Howard Stark, who becomes War Machine. After two years of unsuccessful development, and the deal with Cassavetes falling through, New Line Cinema returned the film rights to Marvel. In November 2005, Marvel Studios decided to start development from scratch, discarding all previous scripts, and announced Iron Man as their first film of the MCU.

== Carolco Pictures / MGM James Cameron's Spider-Man ==
21st Century's Menahem Golan still actively immersed himself in mounting "his" Spider-Man, sending the original "Doc Ock" script for production bids. In 1990, he contacted Canadian effects company Light and Motion Corporation regarding the visual effects, which in turn offered the stop-motion chores to Steven Archer (Krull, Clash of the Titans).

Toward the end of shooting True Lies, Variety carried the announcement that Carolco Pictures had received a completed screenplay from James Cameron. This script bore the names of Cameron, John Brancato, Ted Newsom, Barry [sic] Cohen and "Joseph Goldmari", a typographical scrambling of Golan's pen name ("Joseph Goldman") with Marvel executive Joseph Calamari. The script text was identical to the one Golan submitted to Columbia the previous year, with the addition of a new 1993 date. Cameron stalwart Arnold Schwarzenegger was frequently linked to the project as the director's choice for Doctor Octopus.

Months later, Cameron submitted an undated 57-page "scriptment" with an alternate story (the copyright registration was dated 1991), part screenplay, part narrative story outline. The "scriptment" told the Spider-Man origin story, but used variations on the comic book characters Electro and Sandman as villains. This "Electro" (named Carlton Strand, instead of Max Dillon) was a megalomaniacal parody of corrupt capitalists. Instead of Flint Marko's character, Cameron's "Sandman" (simply named Boyd) is mutated by an accident involving Philadelphia Experiment-style bilocation and atom-mixing, instead of getting caught in a nuclear blast on a beach. The story climaxes with a battle atop the World Trade Center and had Peter Parker revealing his identity to Mary Jane Watson. In addition, the treatment was also heavy on profanity, and had Spider-Man and Mary Jane having sex on the Brooklyn Bridge.

This treatment reflected elements in previous scripts: from the Stevens treatment, organic web-shooters, and a villain who tempts Spider-Man to join a coming "master race" of mutants; from the original screenplay and rewrite, weird electrical storms causing blackouts, freak magnetic events and bi-location; from the Ethan Wiley draft, a villain addicted to toxic super-powers and multiple experimental spiders, one of which escapes and bites Peter, causing an hallucinatory nightmare invoking Franz Kafka's The Metamorphosis; from the Frank LaLoggia script, a blizzard of stolen cash fluttering down onto surprised New Yorkers; and from the Neil Ruttenberg screenplay, a criminal assault on the New York Stock Exchange. In 1991, Carolco Pictures extended Golan's option agreement with Marvel through May 1996, but in April 1992, Carolco ceased active production on Spider-Man due to continued financial and legal problems.

When Cameron agreed to make Spider-Man, Carolco lawyers simply used his previous Terminator 2 contract as a template. A clause in this agreement gave Cameron the right to decide on movie and advertising credits. Show business trade articles and advertisements made no mention of Golan, who was still actively assembling the elements for the film. In 1993, Golan complained publicly and finally instigated legal action against Carolco for disavowing his contractual guarantee of credit as producer. On the other hand, Cameron had the contractual right to decide on credits. Eventually, Carolco sued Viacom and Columbia to recover broadcast and home video rights, and the two studios countersued. 20th Century Fox, though not part of the litigation, contested Cameron's participation, claiming exclusivity on his services as a director under yet another contract. In 1996, Carolco, 21st Century, and Marvel went bankrupt.

Via a quitclaim from Carolco dated March 28, 1995, MGM acquired 21st Century's film library and assets, and received "...all rights in and to all drafts and versions of the screenplay(s) for Spider-Man written by James Cameron, Ted Newsom & John Brancato, Menahem Golan, Jon [sic] Michael Paul, Ethan Wiley, Leslie Stevens, Frank Laloggia, Neil Ruttenberg, Barney Cohen, Shepard Goldman and any other writers." MGM also sued 21st Century, Viacom, and Marvel Comics, alleging fraud in the original deal between Cannon and Marvel. In 1998, Marvel emerged from bankruptcy with a reorganization plan that merged the company with Toy Biz. The courts determined that the original contract of Marvel's rights to Golan had expired, returning the rights to Marvel, but the matter was still not completely resolved. In 1999, Marvel licensed Spider-Man rights to Columbia, a subsidiary of Sony Pictures Entertainment. MGM disputed the legality, claiming it had the Spider-Man rights via Cannon, 21st Century, and Carolco.

== She-Hulk ==
A She-Hulk live-action motion picture was planned in the early 1990s, with Larry Cohen as writer and director. Ten months later, Brigitte Nielsen was announced to play the title role in Cohen's film. She posed for photos dressed both as She-Hulk and her alter ego Jennifer Walters, but the movie was never produced. In August 2022, She-Hulk: Attorney at Law, a television series featuring the character set in the Marvel Cinematic Universe, premiered on Disney+, with Tatiana Maslany portraying her.

== Artisan Entertainment Films ==
On May 16, 2000, Marvel Enterprises entered into a deal with Artisan to develop 13 smaller budget films revolving around their characters, including:

Black Panther, starring Wesley Snipes, Deadpool, Iron Fist, Morbius, Longshot, Power Pack, Mort the Dead Teenager, and Ant-Man.

== Deathlok ==
In the early 2000's, a Deathlok film was at the script stage, with screenwriter Randall Frakes writing the script, but the project never moved forward. Paramount Pictures bought the film rights in 2001, and hired Lee Tamahori to direct. Stu Zicherman and Raven Metzner were assigned as writer, while Avi Arad and Steven Paul would produce. In 2004, Paul McGuigan was being considered to replace Tamahori, while David Self provided rewrites. McGuigan later revealed that he was involved, but Marvel Studios put the film on a hiatus. He also praised Self's screenplay and that he envisioned Robert Downey Jr. for the lead role.

== Charles Band's Doctor Strange ==
In the early 1990s, Charles Band held the rights to film an adaptation of Doctor Strange, but the option expired before production on a film could begin. Instead of scrapping the project, the script was rewritten by C. Courtney Joyner to include original characters not directly adapted from the comics property. Concept art for the main character was designed by Jack Kirby. The film was eventually released as Doctor Mordrid, by Full Moon Features.

In 2022, Joyner debunked that this was ever intended to be a Doctor Strange movie and it was only ever intended to be an original character named Doctor Mordrid (although was originally named Mister/Doctor Mortalis).

"Never. The story has gotten so speculative and messed up. I don't know if Charlie [Band] was ever in negotiations for the Strange rights, as he and Stan Lee were good friends and remained so until Stan's death. When I was brought on, Doctor Mordrid was known as Doctor Mortalis and was the creation of Jack Kirby. More along the line was a money problem, and I was asked to step in and use the material that was there in the concept. Which was Strange-like for sure. But when I came on, there was no switch around from Strange comics or anything like that..."

== Mort the Dead Teenager ==
A film adaptation of the 4-issue miniseries Mort the Dead Teenager had been in development since 1997. Robert Zemeckis and Steven Spielberg were attached to produce at DreamWorks Pictures with Jim Cooper writing the script. Elijah Wood was in talks for the role of the titular character and Dominique Swain as his love interest.

Production had switched sometime around 2002 with Quentin Tarantino and Madonna replacing Spielberg and Zemeckis, production now at A Band Apart alongside distribution by Dimension Films, with Dean Paraskevopoulos hired to direct. Jessica Simpson was reportedly cast as Mort's love interest a year later, with test footage shot. Original comic author Larry Hama later stated that he had no large involvement with any of the attempted adaptations despite writing a screenplay, and that his involvement with the future of the comic ended after it was finished.

As of 2023, the film has not been made, and it is assumed to have been shelved. 8 minutes of test footage was cut into a pitch trailer, which was uploaded to YouTube channel "Mort" on September 14, 2025.

== Power Pack ==
On May 16, 2000, Marvel Enterprises agreed to develop 15 franchises into live-action films, television series, direct-to-video films, and internet projects, one of which was Power Pack.

On April 22, 2010, they announced their plans to develop lesser-known characters into films such as the Power Pack.

On September 28, 2017, it was reported that Marvel Studios was having Jonathan Schwartz oversee the film as a Spy Kids-like story.

On June 25, 2018, Kevin Feige expressed interest in returning to Power Pack someday for a film.

== Iron Fist ==
In May 2000, Marvel Studios brought Artisan Entertainment to co-finance an Iron Fist film, hiring Ray Park to star and John Turman to write the script in January 2001. Park extensively read the comics Iron Fist had appeared in. Kirk Wong signed to direct in July 2001, with filming set for late 2001/early 2002. Iron Fist nearly went into pre-production in March 2002. Wong left the project in April 2002. By August 2002, pre-production had started. Filming was pushed back to late 2002, and then to late 2003. In March 2003, Marvel announced a 2004 release date. In April 2003, Steve Carr entered negotiations to direct. In November 2003, the release date was moved to 2006. In March 2007, Carr placed Iron Fist on hold due to scheduling conflicts. In 2009, Marvel announced they had begun hiring a group of writers to help come up with creative ways to launch its lesser-known properties, such as Iron Fist, along with others such as Black Panther, Cable, Doctor Strange, Nighthawk, and Vision. In August 2010, Marvel Studios hired Rich Wilkes to write the screenplay, implying that Marvel had a future Iron Fist film project planned. In November 2013, Disney CEO Bob Iger stated that they "probably were never going to make feature films about" characters featured in Marvel's Netflix TV series such as Iron Fist but that if the Netflix series became popular, "[it was] quite possible that they could become feature films."

== The Hands of Shang-Chi ==
In 2001, Stephen Norrington announced that he had agreed to direct a film called The Hands of Shang-Chi: Master of Kung Fu, a film adaptation based on the Marvel character Shang-Chi. Norrington described the film as "a real honest-to-goodness martial arts film, rather than a film that simply has martial arts in it". In 2004, it was announced that Ang Lee had been brought on as producer. In 2005, it was announced that Stan Lee had agreed to executive produce the film for DreamWorks, with Yuen Woo-ping directing from a Bruce C. McKenna screenplay. In 2005, Avi Arad stated that he thought that a PG-13 adaptation was possible. In 2006, Ang Lee confirmed his and Yuen's continued involvement with the project. In December 2018, a different film adaptation of Shang-Chi, Shang-Chi and the Legend of the Ten Rings, set in the Marvel Cinematic Universe with Simu Liu in the title role, was announced, with a script by David Callaham. In March 2019, Destin Daniel Cretton was chosen to direct.

== Nick Fury ==
Andrew W. Marlowe was hired to write the script in 2006. The script he wrote was loosely based on Jim Steranko's Nick Fury, Agent of S.H.I.E.L.D. series and involved the S.H.I.E.L.D. Helicarrier. The script was not written for the version of the character appearing in the Marvel Cinematic Universe, as it was constructed before Samuel L. Jackson was cast. Marlowe said that the script could be "tweaked" for Jackson's portrayal, but no further developments took place.

== Guillermo del Toro's Doctor Strange ==
In 2007, Guillermo del Toro was attached to direct a Doctor Strange film, which would have been based upon ideas arising from conversations del Toro had with Neil Gaiman. The film was eventually canceled due to low studio interest.

== Rom ==
In December 2015, The Hollywood Reporter reported that Hasbro Studios and Paramount Pictures were creating a movie universe combining Rom with G.I. Joe, Micronauts, Visionaries: Knights of the Magical Light, and M.A.S.K. Michael Chabon, Brian K. Vaughan, Nicole Perlman, Lindsey Beer, Cheo Coker, John Francis Daley, Jonathan Goldstein, Joe Robert Cole, Jeff Pinkner, Nicole Riegel, and Geneva Robertson-Dworet had joined the writing team for the project. By March 2018, Zak Penn had signed on to write the film's script.

== JLA/Avengers film ==
In 2009, Bruce Timm expressed interest in making an animated film based on the JLA/Avengers comics series. Since then, there have been no further announcements.

== Big Hero 6 sequel ==
On February 18, 2015, the directors of Big Hero 6, Don Hall and Chris Williams, said a sequel was possible. Hall added, "Having said that, of course, we love these characters, and the thought of working with them again someday definitely has its appeal." In March 2015, Genesis Rodriguez told MTV that a sequel was being considered, saying, "…There's nothing definitive. There are talks of something happening. We just don't know what yet." In April 2015, Stan Lee mentioned a projected sequel as one of several that he understood were in Marvel's plans for upcoming films. A film sequel was scrapped in favor of Big Hero 6: The Series, created and executive produced by Kim Possible's Mark McCorkle and Bob Schooley, and co-executive produced by Nick Filippi. The majority of the cast from the film returned to voice the characters, except for Damon Wayans Jr. and T.J. Miller.

In March 2021, head animator Zach Parrish expressed a desire for a sequel, "There have definitely been stories told beyond... I think there's still a lot of potential. There's still plenty of time. The beauty of animation is that it can pick up the story at the very end of Big Hero, or we could jump in time. We could go wherever we want, since it's an animation."

Baymax!, produced by Walt Disney Animation Studios, was released on Disney+ on June 29, 2022.

== Lionsgate films ==
=== Lionsgate's Black Widow ===
In 2004, Lionsgate Entertainment announced that a Black Widow motion picture, featuring the Natasha Romanova version, was in the script stage by screenwriter-director David Hayter. Lionsgate subsequently dropped the project. Since then, the rights to the character were reverted to Marvel. After the character's live action debut in Iron Man 2, Kevin Feige indicated interest in producing a solo Black Widow film, and in February 2014, development had begun on it. In January 2018, Jac Schaeffer was hired to write the script. In July, Cate Shortland was hired to direct. The film was released theatrically and on Disney+ on July 9, 2021, with Scarlett Johansson reprising her role as Natasha.

=== Punisher Films ===
==== The Punisher 2 ====
Lions Gate Entertainment planned to produce a direct sequel to The Punisher titled The Punisher 2, with Avi Arad, chairman and CEO of Marvel Studios, stating that the second film would "become the fifth Marvel property to become a sequel." Jonathan Hensleigh said that he was interested in working with Thomas Jane again for The Punisher 2. Jane said that the villain for The Punisher 2 would be Jigsaw. The project, however, lingered in development for over three years. Jonathan Hensleigh completed a first draft of the script before pulling out around 2006. John Dahl was in talks to direct the film, but pulled out due to script quality issues and the studio not wanting to spend a lot of money on the project. In a statement on May 15, 2007 and in two audio interviews Thomas Jane said that he pulled out of the project due to creative differences and the budget of the film being cut, in addition to director Walter Hill being turned down as director by Lionsgate. After reading the new script by Kurt Sutter, Jane stated: "What I won't do is spend months of my life sweating over a movie that I just don't believe in. I've always loved the Marvel guys and wish them well. Meanwhile, I'll continue to search for a film that one day might stand with all those films that the fans have asked me to watch." The film got rebooted in 2008 titled Punisher: War Zone with Ray Stevenson as Castle.

==== Punisher: War Zone sequel ====
In September 2008, Ray Stevenson and Lionsgate were planning a sequel to Punisher: War Zone, hinting at Barracuda as a possible villain. At the 2008 San Diego Comic-Con, when asked if he signed on for more Punisher, he said, "If I had my wish, it's going to run and run. It's up to the fan base. If this works, we get to do it all again." After the film was not received well by audiences, the rights for the character eventually reverted to Marvel, resulting in the Netflix series adaptation.

=== Ultimate War / Thor ===
In January 2013, a proposed Ultimate War / Thor dual film DVD, for the Marvel Animated Features series, was passed over for the 2009 released Hulk Versus dual film DVD. Ultimate War would have adapted the Ultimate Marvel comic book of the same name while the Thor movie would have selected a Walt Simonson's classic Thor storyline with the original selection being a Beta Ray Bill story.

== Sony Pictures films ==
=== Spider-Man films ===
==== Spider-Man 3 sequels ====
In May 2007, Spider-Man 4 entered development, with Sam Raimi attached to direct and Tobey Maguire, Kirsten Dunst, and other cast members set to reprise their roles. Both a fourth and a fifth film were planned, and at one time, the idea of shooting the two sequels concurrently was under consideration. However, Raimi stated in March 2009 that only the fourth film was in development at that time and that if there were fifth and sixth films, those two films would actually be a continuation of each other. James Vanderbilt was hired in October 2007 to pen the screenplay after initial reports in January 2007 that Sony Pictures was in contact with David Koepp, who wrote the first Spider-Man film. The script was subsequently rewritten by Pulitzer-winning playwright David Lindsay-Abaire in November 2008 and rewritten again by Gary Ross in October 2009. Sony also engaged Vanderbilt to write scripts for Spider-Man 5 and Spider-Man 6. In 2007, Raimi expressed interest in portraying the transformation of Dr. Curt Connors into his villainous alter-ego, the Lizard, a villain which had been teased since Spider-Man 2; the character's actor Dylan Baker and producer Grant Curtis were also enthusiastic about the idea. By December 2009, John Malkovich was in negotiations to play Vulture and Anne Hathaway would play Felicia Hardy, though she would not have transformed into the Black Cat as in the comics but a new superpowered figure, the Vulturess. Jeffrey Henderson, who worked on the storyboards for Spider-Man 4, said in 2016 that Bruce Campbell, after making cameos in the first three films, was intended to have been revealed as Quentin Beck / Mysterio.

According to sources online, an early draft of the film would have had the Vulture buying out the Daily Bugle, forcing Spider-Man to kill him. Felicia Hardy, Vulture's daughter in this version of the script, would have had an affair with Peter Parker to shatter his engagement with Mary Jane. These rumors were never confirmed. Raimi stated years later during an interview in 2013, however, that Hathaway was going to be Black Cat if Spider-Man 4 had been made. Sony Pictures announced in January 2010 that plans for Spider-Man 4 had been cancelled due to Raimi's withdrawal from the project. Raimi reportedly ended his participation due to his doubt that he could meet the planned May 6, 2011, release date while at the same time upholding the film creatively. Raimi purportedly went through four iterations of the script with different screenwriters and still "hated it".

==== The Amazing Spider-Man 2 sequels ====
Sony Pictures had originally intended the film to launch an expansive film universe around Spider-Man to compete with the Marvel Cinematic Universe. In June 2013, Sony Pictures announced a third Amazing Spider-Man film with a release date of June 10, 2016, which Alex Kurtzman, Roberto Orci, and Jeff Pinkner would return to write, and a fourth film with a release date of May 4, 2018. However, between December 2013 and the release of The Amazing Spider-Man 2 in May 2014, Andrew Garfield and Marc Webb revealed that while they would both return for the third film, neither was certain of their involvement in the fourth, with Webb adding he would certainly not be directing. Following the mixed critical reviews and franchise-low box office performance of The Amazing Spider-Man 2, the future of the franchise was unclear. By July 2014, Orci had left the third film to work on Star Trek Beyond. The Amazing Spider-Man 3, which would have included Chris Cooper returning as Norman Osborn and focused on Peter recovering from Gwen's death, was delayed to an unspecified date in 2018, and The Amazing Spider-Man 4 was moved to a later, unknown date, before they were ultimately canceled.

=== Ghost Rider 3 ===
In February 2012, directors Mark Neveldine and Brian Taylor discussed producing a potential Ghost Rider 3, and having someone else direct it. Neveldine told The Playlist that Nicolas Cage had expressed interest in appearing in another Ghost Rider film, hinting that the film could move forward provided that Ghost Rider: Spirit of Vengeance was a success, saying, "I know Nic wants to do it, he's very pumped about it.... We'll just have to see how well [this] does." In March 2013, when Cage was asked about a possible third installment, he said, "It's possible, but it won't be with me... Anything's possible. But I doubt, highly, that I would be in the third installment of that." Cage said in March 2013 he believes another Ghost Rider film might happen "down the road", saying, "It would be interesting if they did it with a female Ghost Rider." He added, "Personally, I'm done. I've done what I had to do with that part. You never say never, but right now, today, I would say that I'm done." In May 2013, the film rights to the character reverted to Marvel Studios, with the Robbie Reyes version appearing as a recurring character during the fourth season of Agents of S.H.I.E.L.D., portrayed by Gabriel Luna. In the episode "The Good Samaritan", the MCU's version of Johnny Blaze / Ghost Rider, brings Robbie back from the dead by giving him the powers of the Ghost Rider / Spirit of Vengeance.

=== Luke Cage ===
In 1991, Quentin Tarantino was planning a Luke Cage film with Laurence Fishburne, but he decided to focus on Pulp Fiction. A different film adaptation of Luke Cage had been in development since 2003 by Columbia Pictures, with a screenplay penned by Ben Ramsey, Avi Arad serving as producer and John Singleton directing. Jamie Foxx and Tyrese Gibson were considered for the lead role, while Dwayne Johnson, Isaiah Mustafa and Idris Elba expressed interest in playing Luke Cage. In May 2013, it was announced that the film rights for Power Man had reverted to Marvel Studios, resulting in the Netflix series adaptation.

=== Topher Grace's Venom spinoff ===
The Marvel Comics character Eddie Brock, an antagonist of Spider-Man, was first introduced in cinema in the May 2007 film Spider-Man 3, with Topher Grace in the role. The character was initially intended to play only a minor role that did not explore his alter-ego Venom, but this was eventually changed to a major villain role for the latter because producer Avi Arad felt the series had relied too much on director Sam Raimi's personal favorite Spider-Man villains and not characters that modern fans were more interested in. Raimi had been hesitant to explore the character due to his "lack of humanity". Arad revealed plans for a spinoff film focused on Venom in July 2007. By July 2008, Sony Pictures was actively developing Venom alongside direct sequels to Spider-Man 3, hoping the character could "add longevity" to the franchise in a similar fashion to Wolverine in 20th Century Fox's X-Men films. Jacob Estes had written a script for the film, but the studio was considering taking it in a different direction from that draft and was seeking new writers. Sony was also not yet convinced that Grace could "carry" the film.

That September, Sony hired Paul Wernick and Rhett Reese to write a new script, while industry insiders suggested that Grace should return for the spinoff "because the likeable actor could be a sympathetic evildoer", in response to Venom co-creator Todd McFarlane suggesting that a Venom film could not do well with a villain as the central character. Wernick and Reese had pitched an original story idea for the film to Sony, which Reese described as "realistic, grounded, a little more dark take on the character". The pair then worked on an outline with Sony and Marvel, who "had specific rules about the villain and the backstory and stuff like that". They had completed a draft by April 2009, which included a role written specifically for Stan Lee, and featured a sequence where the Venom symbiote jumps "from body to body [through a city], and each person that it inhabits ends up becoming really violent and striking someone else and then it jumps to [them]." Wernick and Reese had turned in a second draft by September 2009, and Reese said that Sony was "pushing forward in whatever ways they push forward".

A month later, Gary Ross, who was rewriting the script for Spider-Man 4 at the time, was hired to also rewrite the Venom script, as well as direct, and produce alongside Arad. Grace was "not considered likely" to return to the role then, with the film starting "from the drawing board" and looking to make the villain "an antihero who becomes a defender of the innocent." In January 2010, Sony announced that the Spider-Man franchise would be rebooted after Raimi decided to no longer pursue direct sequels to Spider-Man 3.

=== The Amazing Spider-Man spin-offs ===
Additionally, the series was to include spin-off films.

==== Venom Carnage ====
By March 2012, Sony was still interested in a Venom film, now looking to capitalize on the release of the first reboot film, The Amazing Spider-Man. The studio was in negotiations with Josh Trank to direct after Ross left the project to direct The Hunger Games (2012). That June, Arad and fellow producer Matt Tolmach discussed Venom connecting to The Amazing Spider-Man, after comparisons to the Marvel Cinematic Universe films crossing over in The Avengers (2012). Arad called it "an Eddie Brock story," only, but Tolmach added, "Hopefully all these worlds will live together in peace someday." In December 2013, Sony revealed plans to use The Amazing Spider-Man 2 (2014) to establish their own expanded universe based on the Marvel properties the studio had the film rights to, including Venom. Arad and Tolmach would produce the films as part of a franchise brain trust with Alex Kurtzman, Roberto Orci, and Ed Solomon set to write the screenplay for Venom, which Kurtzman would direct.

In April 2014, Arad and Tolmach said Venom would be released after The Amazing Spider-Man 3—which was set for release on May 27, 2016—but before The Amazing Spider-Man 4. However, The Amazing Spider-Man 2 underperformed, and, with Sony "under tremendous pressure to perform [that had them taking] a hard look at their most important franchise", the direction of the shared universe was rethought. The Amazing Spider-Man 3 was pushed back to 2018, and the Venom film, now known as Venom Carnage, was moved up to 2017. Kurtzman was still attached to direct, and write alongside Solomon. In February 2015, Sony and Marvel Studios announced a new partnership that would see Marvel produce the next Spider-Man film for Sony, and integrate the character into their MCU. Sony still planned to produce the spinoff films without Marvel's involvement, but by November they were believed to have been canceled so Sony could focus on its new reboot with Marvel.

==== Black Cat film ====
Sony Pictures had hired Lisa Joy Nolan to write the script for a 2017 film starring Felicia Hardy / Black Cat.

==== Spider-Man 2099 ====
In addition, Sony Pictures revealed plans for a spin-off based on Spider-Man 2099 to be released in late 2017.

==== Sinister Six ====
In December 2013, Sony announced two spin-offs of The Amazing Spider-Man franchise, The Sinister Six and Venom, with Drew Goddard attached to write and direct The Sinister Six. At the end of The Amazing Spider-Man 2, a line-up/set-up of the team was foreshadowed throughout the film and during the end credits: Rhino, Vulture, Doctor Octopus, Mysterio, and Kraven the Hunter were all teased as the members, with the Green Goblin serving as the leader (however, the line-up is left in debate as Goddard stated he wanted to adapt a more classic adaptation of the group which would have included Sandman and Doc Ock as the leader). The film was said to be a redemption story for the characters and would probably not feature Spider-Man. As the Sinister Six's original goal, however, was to kill him, there would seem to be a chance that he would appear. The film was originally scheduled for release on November 11, 2016. However, after the announcement in February 2015 of a new Spider-Man franchise with Marvel Studios, the spin-offs were postponed and eventually cancelled.

In July 2017, following the collaboration between Marvel Studios and Sony Pictures, a different film featuring the Sinister Six was announced to be in development. The team was teased in the mid-credits scene of Spider-Man: Homecoming, showing Adrian Toomes in prison where he is told by Mac Gargan that he's got some "boys on the outside". In an email leaked by the Sony Pictures hack, Pascal revealed that she planned for Tom Holland's Spider-Man to appear in a Sinister Six film set in the Marvel Cinematic Universe, depending on the success of the then-upcoming licensing agreement with Marvel Studios. In October 2018, Goddard acknowledge that his script could eventually be reworked for the film. By December of the same year, producer Amy Pascal confirmed that the studio intends to use the script in the upcoming project and expressed the company's desire for Goddard to direct the film as well.

=== Silver & Black ===
In March 2017, it was reported that Sony Pictures was developing a Black Cat and Silver Sable-centered film with writer Christopher Yost. It was intended to be a part of a shared universe called Sony's Spider-Man Universe, centered on characters from the Spider-Man mythology, beginning with Venom in 2018. The films would have been more adult-oriented, and though they would have taken place in the "same reality" as the Marvel Cinematic Universe, they would not have crossed over with each other. In May 2017, it was announced that Gina Prince-Bythewood would direct the film, now titled Silver & Black. Production was to begin in March 2018, but was delayed "indefinitely". Prince-Bythewood revealed that the cause of the delay was due to script issues. While the film was initially scheduled to be released on February 8, 2019, Sony removed the release date from the schedule. Production was slated to begin in 2019. In August 2018, Sony announced that Silver & Black would be canceled in favor of having both characters having their own feature films. Black Cat would reportedly be a re-worked version of the Silver & Black script, while the studio searched for screenwriters for Silver Sable. Prince-Bythewood was set to serve as a producer on both projects.

== New Line Cinema films ==
=== Venom ===
In 1997, David S. Goyer wrote a script for a film featuring the Marvel Comics character Venom, which was to be produced by New Line Cinema. Dolph Lundgren was rumoured to be tipped to star in the film, which would have included the character Carnage as the main villain. The project ultimately did not move forward, and the rights to the character moved to Sony Pictures along with those for the character Spider-Man, whom Venom is an antagonist of in the comics. In October 2018, a trilogy of Venom films set in Sony's Spider-Man Universe (SSU) started.

=== Shang Chi, Master of Kung Fu ===
In 1999, Chris Lee Productions along with Marvel Studios were setting up a film based off the Master of Kung Fu comics at New Line Cinema. Wych Kaosayananda was originally set to direct the film, however Stephen Norrington would confirm his involvement as director in 2001. However the rights for Shang Chi would transfer over to DreamWorks Pictures in 2003.

=== Luke Cage ===
In August 2000, New Line Cinema was reported to have been eyeing for the rights to Luke Cage with Akiva Goldsman's Weed Road Pictures producing. The project was looked at for a potential 2001 release date but New Line would end up losing the bid to Sony Pictures.

=== Deadpool ===
Director David S. Goyer pitched to Ryan Reynolds a film based off Deadpool during production of Blade Trinity. Reynolds was interested in the part of Deadpool after reading issue 2 of Cable and Deadpool where the character refers to his appearance as "Ryan Renolds crossed with a Shar-Pei". After shooting Blade Trinity, Avi Arad would reportedly tell Reynolds, "Ryan I want you to play Deadpool, you've got to do Deadpool, I don't know how we'll do it but we'll do it." Writer Mark Millar was rumored to be writing the film along with Goyer though the writer would deny any claims at first. Kevin Feige would also confirm of the film in an interview with Wizard Magazine where he would say, "Deadpool is one of our favorite characters. It'll definitely find its way to the screen in the near future."New Line Cinema executive Jeff Katz, who thought Reynolds was the only actor suitable for the role, championed the idea. However in March 2005, Reynolds would confirm that the film was out of New Line's hands and that 20th Century Fox was interested in the film.

=== Nightstalkers ===
During the filming of Blade Trinity, New Line was prepping the film to spin off Ryan Reynolds's Hannibal King and Jessica Biel's Abigail Whistler into a spinoff film, with an alternate ending showing them hunting for werewolves in a casino. Reynolds would confirm in an interview that he and Biel had signed on for one more movie and that New Line was prepping the film to be a new franchise at the studio. The project would be at the center of a lawsuit against New Line Cinema from Wesley Snipes in April 2005 where the actor alleged the studio of making Blade Trinity to prop up these characters for a spin off. That same month, Reynolds would sow doubt on a Nightstalkers movie and would distance himself from the project.

=== Deacon Frost ===
In October 2008, Blade director Stephen Norrington was developing a prequel trilogy to Blade, featuring Stephen Dorff reprising his role as Deacon Frost. Dorff likened the film to Scarface and would even plan to make it an original film if New Line were to not pick up the project.

== Universal Pictures films ==
=== Namor the Sub-Mariner ===
Filmmaker Philip Kaufman had been in discussions with Marvel Studios to develop Namor: Sub-Mariner in 1997, and courted Sam Hamm to write the script in 1999, but the outing never materialized. Saban Entertainment became involved as a producing partner with Marvel, with a script written by Randall Frakes. By 2001, Namor was set up at Universal Pictures, who hired David Self to write a new script the following year. They hoped for filming to begin in 2003 for a mid-2004 release, but development stalled for two years until Chris Columbus entered talks to direct in July 2004 and the release date was subsequently moved to 2007. Columbus departed in 2005, and Universal replaced him with Jonathan Mostow in September 2006. In 2012, Marvel CCO Joe Quesada thought Namor's film rights had reverted to Marvel, but in August 2013 it was revealed by Marvel Studios President Kevin Feige that this was not the case, and the rights remained at Universal Pictures.

On June 3, 2014, Borys Kit confirmed that Marvel, not Universal Pictures, now had the Namor film rights. On July 18, 2014, Kevin Feige told IGN in an interview that the Namor film rights were not with Universal and Legendary Pictures, but he explained that there were a number of contracts and deals that needed to be sorted out. On June 2, 2016, Marvel Chief Creative Officer Joe Quesada told Kevin Smith on his podcast that the Namor rights were back with Marvel. On February 16, 2017, Production Weekly listed The Sub-Mariner as a project going into production. In April 2018, Feige stated in an interview with IGN that Namor's movie rights were "complicated" and in a similar situation to solo film rights for The Hulk, with Universal holding distribution rights for a Namor solo film. This is why Namor can appear in 2022's Black Panther: Wakanda Forever and 2026's Avengers: Doomsday, but not a solo film where he is the lead character.

=== Hulk 2 ===
At the time of the release of Ang Lee's Hulk, screenwriter James Schamus was planning a sequel, featuring the Grey Hulk. He was also considering the Leader and the Abomination as villains. Marvel wanted the Abomination because he would be an actual threat to the Hulk, unlike General Ross. During the filming of Hulk, producer Avi Arad had a target May 2005 theatrical release date. On January 18, 2006, Arad confirmed Marvel Studios would be providing the money for The Incredible Hulk's production budget, with Universal distributing, because Universal did not meet the deadline for filming a sequel. Marvel felt it would be better to deviate from Ang Lee's style to continue the franchise, arguing his film was like a parallel universe one-shot comic book, and their next film needed to be, in Kevin Feige's words, "really starting the Marvel Hulk franchise". Producer Gale Anne Hurd also felt the film had to meet what "everyone expects to see from having read the comics and seen the TV series". After the mixed reception of Hulk, Marvel Studios reacquired the film rights to the character, and writer Zak Penn began work on a sequel titled The Incredible Hulk. However, Edward Norton rewrote Penn's script after he signed on to star, retelling the origin story in flashbacks and revelations, to help in establishing the film as a reboot; director Louis Leterrier agreed with this approach. Leterrier acknowledged that the only remaining similarity between the two films was Bruce hiding in South America.

=== Howard the Duck ===
In 1984, George Lucas announced development of an animated film based on the character created by Steve Gerber and quoting lines from Bill Mantlo. Director Willard Huyck and producer Gloria Katz strongly felt that the film should stay animated, but a contractual obligation with Universal Pictures required Lucas to provide the distributor with a live-action film, so he decided to make the film using live actors and to use special effects for Howard, resulting in the 1986 box office bomb. Katz said that the animated Howard the Duck film "would have taken too much time and too much money." In 2019, another animated adaptation of Howard, as a television series, was announced to be released on Hulu, from writers Kevin Smith and Dave Willis; however, it was cancelled.

== Marvel Studios films ==
The following is a list of unproduced films that would be part of the Marvel Cinematic Universe.

=== Cable ===
On March 26, 2009, it was reported that Marvel Studios would begin assembling a group of screenwriters to pen the scripts for various lesser known properties that they wanted to develop, one of which being Cable.

Cable would be featured in the 2018 film Deadpool 2, as part of the X-Men film series released by 20th Century Fox before the studio was bought by The Walt Disney Company. He was portrayed by Josh Brolin.

=== Iron Fist ===
On March 26, 2009, it was reported that Marvel Studios would begin assembling a group of screenwriters to pen the scripts for various lesser known properties that they wanted to develop, one of which being Iron Fist.

On August 16, 2010, when asked what he would follow up The Avengers with, Kevin Feige expressed interest in Iron Fist.

A television series created by Scott Buck premiered on Netflix in 2017, where Iron Fist was portrayed by Finn Jones. It was canceled in 2018 after two seasons.

=== Dazzler ===
On April 22, 2010, it was reported that Marvel Studios had started searching for directors to make films with lower budgets based on some of their lesser known characters, one of which being Dazzler.

Rumors circulated before the release of Deadpool & Wolverine that Taylor Swift would be playing the character after making several public appearances with the cast and crew of the film. Ryan Reynolds denied these rumors in 2022.

=== Ka-Zar ===
On April 22, 2010, it was reported that Marvel Studios had started searching for directors to make films with lower budgets based on some of their lesser known characters, one of which being Ka-Zar.

=== Luke Cage ===
On April 22, 2010, it was reported that Marvel Studios had started searching for directors to make films with lower budgets based on some of their lesser known characters, one of which being Luke Cage.

A television series created by Cheo Hodari Coker premiered on Netflix in 2016, where Cage is portrayed by Mike Colter. It was canceled after two seasons in 2018.

=== Runaways ===
Marvel Studios was originally developing a film based on the Runaways team in May 2008, with Brian K. Vaughan writing the screenplay. Peter Sollett was hired to direct in April 2010, with Drew Pearce hired to write the next month. That October, the film was put on hold in favor of The Avengers and had the potential to release in Marvel's Phase Three slate of films. When Kevin Feige announced the Phase Three slate in October 2014, he said the studio retained the script and that Runaways was discussed for upcoming films and television projects, but noted that they could not make all of them. In August 2016, Marvel Television announced that they were moving forward with the series Marvel's Runaways for the streaming service Hulu, receiving a full-series order in May 2017 and premiered that November. The series ended with its third season in December 2019.

=== Warriors Three ===
On May 9, 2011, Keven Feige was asked about a Warriors Three film and said there was a chance for them to have a film following the release of Thor: The Dark World.

=== Iron Man 4 ===
In June 2014, it was announced that Robert Downey Jr. was expected to be replaced in his role for a fourth Iron Man film and that he would produce the film.

On July 23, 2014, Downey expressed interest in returning for the role of Iron Man.

=== Guardians of the Galaxy prequel One-Shots ===
Guardians of the Galaxy (2014) director James Gunn had originally intended to introduce each of the members of the Guardians through a series of Marvel One-Shots that would have played before the film in theaters. Partial footage for a Groot and Rocket Raccoon episode was shot, and shown at San Diego Comic Con, with a role for Alan Tudyk also written into the short by Gunn. Only the script for the Groot and Rocket short had been completed at the time of cancellation. Gunn considers the events of the short, which showcased the meeting of the two characters, to still have occurred.

=== Captain Britain and the Black Knight ===
On June 27, 2017, in an interview with Hey U Guys, Kevin Feige stated that Marvel Studios had discussed bringing Brian Braddock/Captain Britain to the Marvel Cinematic Universe, stating "We have discussed it. There are a lot of actors that come in and ask for the part, so we'll have to see".

On May 10, 2018, Simon Pegg expressed interest in portraying Captain Britain.

On September 8, 2018, it was reported that Marvel Studios had booked space at Pinewood Studios UK in November and December 2018 to hold auditions for a project called Captain Britain and the Black Knight.

On November 10, 2021, Henry Cavill expressed interest in portraying Captain Britain.

=== Untitled Drax and Mantis film ===
In March 2020, Drax actor Dave Bautista revealed that James Gunn, director of the Guardians of the Galaxy trilogy, had pitched a film based around the characters of Drax and Mantis to Marvel Studios, but that it could not release within the next five years due to a full release schedule. Bautista was interested in appearing in the film. In May 2021, Bautista theorised that the studio may have had no interest in the project, due to a lack of communication about it. He indicated that he would likely retire from playing the role of Drax after Guardians of the Galaxy Vol. 3 due to his age, but Drax would remain in the MCU. Gunn replied through Twitter, stating that he believed the role should not be recast.

=== Rocket and Groot Film ===
In 2023, James Gunn had revealed that before his firing he had planned for the story of Guardians of the Galaxy Vol. 3 to play out in a film featuring Rocket and Groot, however, it was later decided to combine it with Guardians of the Galaxy Vol. 3.

=== Avengers: The Kang Dynasty ===
In July 2022 during their Hall H panel at San Diego Comic-Con, Marvel Studios officially announced Avengers: The Kang Dynasty as the first of two films set to conclude Phase Six of the Marvel Cinematic Universe (MCU), as well as The Multiverse Saga arc that began with the MCU's Phase Four, alongside Avengers: Secret Wars. Later that month, it was reported that Destin Daniel Cretton would serve as The Kang Dynasty's director after previously working with Marvel Studios on the Phase Four film Shang-Chi and the Legend of the Ten Rings (2021). In September 2022, Ant-Man and the Wasp: Quantumania (2023) screenwriter Jeff Loveness, was hired to pen the film following his work on conceiving the MCU's adaptation of Kang the Conqueror played by Jonathan Majors. Both The Kang Dynasty and Secret Wars were initially set for theatrical releases on May 2, 2025, and November 7, 2025, respectively, but were subsequently delayed to new dates on May 1, 2026, and May 7, 2027, due to progress on both screenplays being indefinitely halted by the ongoing 2023 Writers Guild of America strike. In March 2023 following Quantummania's release, Majors was arrested in New York City on multiple counts of physical harassment and assault during his relationship with dancer Grace Jabbari. By the time of Majors' arraignment, Marvel had not begun discussing alternate courses of action for the character, such as removing Majors from the franchise. In November 2023, Cretton left the film amicably while retaining involvement in other MCU projects, while Loveness was let go by Marvel as they were preparing to creatively pivot the film's focus away from Kang as the antagonist due to Majors' ongoing legal situation. The next month, Majors was found guilty of third-degree assault and harassment in a final court verdict, prompting Disney and Marvel to sever ties with the actor, with plans to retitle and pivot the fifth Avengers film being publicly announced the following March.

In July 2024 at SDCC, Marvel Studios announced Avengers: Doomsday as the new predecessor to Secret Wars, with returning MCU actor Robert Downey Jr. portraying the film's new primary villain Victor von Doom / Doctor Doom and the Russo brothers directing both installments. The announcement of Doomsday and confirmation of Doctor Doom as the overarching antagonist effectively confirmed Marvel Studios' decision to dissociate from the planned storyline with Kang the Conqueror alongside ending Majors' involvement with the franchise as opposed to recasting the character. Responding to the announcement, Jonathan Majors said he was "heartbroken" to learn of the films moving forward with Doctor Doom over his character, and added he would be open to returning to the MCU if offered.

=== Blade ===
In July 2019, during Marvel Studios' panel at San Diego Comic-Con, Marvel Studios officially announced a new Blade film as part of the Marvel Cinematic Universe (MCU), with Mahershala Ali set to portray Eric Brooks / Blade. Ali's casting was announced by Marvel Studios president Kevin Feige, making the project one of the earliest films announced for the MCU's Phase Four.

In February 2021, Watchmen writer Stacy Osei-Kuffour was hired to write the screenplay, with Ali reportedly involved in the project's development. Bassam Tariq was subsequently hired to direct the film, with production originally expected to begin in 2022.

In November 2021, Ali made an uncredited vocal appearance as Blade in the second post-credits scene of Eternals (2021), marking the character's first appearance in the MCU. The scene showed Dane Whitman encountering an ancient sword before hearing an off-screen voice asking whether he was certain he was ready to wield it.

In September 2022, Tariq departed the film due to changes to its production schedule, with Yann Demange subsequently hired as his replacement. Michael Starrbury was also brought in to rewrite the screenplay. Further rewrites followed, with Nic Pizzolatto and Michael Green subsequently working on different versions of the screenplay.

In 2023, the film was affected by the 2023 Writers Guild of America strike and the 2023 SAG-AFTRA strike, causing production delays. By this point, the project had undergone significant creative changes and multiple screenplay drafts.

In June 2024, Demange departed the project, making him the second director to leave the film after Tariq. Eric Pearson subsequently worked on another version of the screenplay, with Marvel continuing development of the project.

The film had originally been scheduled for release on November 7, 2025. In October 2024, however, Disney removed Blade from its theatrical release calendar, replacing its date with Predator: Badlands. The project remained in development, although no new release date or director was announced.

The project subsequently remained in development without entering principal photography. In July 2026, Marvel Studios president Kevin Feige expressed regret over the film's failure to materialize, saying that he felt like a "gigantic loser and failure" that Marvel had not gotten Ali's Blade off the ground. Feige also said he was proud that Marvel had been able to bring Wesley Snipes back as Blade in Deadpool & Wolverine (2024).

On July 31, 2026, Ali confirmed that he had moved on from the project. In an interview with GQ, Ali said that if Marvel had wanted to make the film, "we would've done it", and stated that he had moved on from the role after years of development and delays. He also said that he felt ready to move on from questions concerning Blade and that those questions should be directed toward Marvel.

Ali's comments marked the end of his involvement with the long-running incarnation of the film, seven years after his casting was first announced. The project had gone through multiple directors and screenwriters and numerous screenplay revisions without entering principal photography.

== See also ==
- List of unproduced DC Comics projects
