= List of unproduced 20th Century Studios animated projects =

This is a list of unmade and unreleased animated projects by 20th Century Studios. Some of these films and shows were, or still are, in development limbo. These also include the co-productions the studio collaborated with in the past (i.e. 20th Century Animation, Fox Animation Studios, 20th Television Animation, and Locksmith Animation), as well as sequels to their franchises and one-off films.

== 1990s ==
=== 1991 ===
Series	Title	Description
Television series	The Adventures of MC Skat Kat and the Stray Mob	Singer Paula Abdul was in talks for an animated series based on the animated rapper MC Skat Kat for Fox Kids along with an animated movie for Universal Pictures. Following the release of the album of the same name, but due to the poor sales and reviews of the album, the ideas never materialized.

=== 1992 ===
Series	Title	Description
Alien	Operation: Aliens	In 1992, a planned animated series based on the 1986 film Aliens titled Operation: Aliens was being produced for Fox Kids along with an LCD game, board game, a Sega Genesis video game, and action figures as tie-ins for the proposed series, but was ultimately cancelled, with the only things that came out of this scrapped project was the action figure line.

=== 1993 ===
Series	Title	Description
Ren & Stimpy	Untitled Ren & Stimpy film	In May 1993, Nickelodeon announced a two-year picture deal with 20th Century Fox to produce some of its films, including its IPs such as the aforementioned Ren & Stimpy. However, the idea of a "warm and fuzzy" family film adaptation of the show's "cynical and gross" style of humor was deemed unfit and would have likely ran into creative issues with creator John Kricfalusi (who would be forced out several months after the deal was announced). Fox's film deal with Nick expired when Viacom purchased the network, along with Paramount Pictures, in 1994 leaving Paramount to distribute and co-produce the network's theatrically released films.
Doug	Untitled Doug film	Nickelodeon was also making a Doug film adaptation in 1993 when they made a deal with Fox to make films based on their properties along with films, but the plans evaporated when Viacom acquired Paramount Pictures in 1994, and the deal expired in the following year. The film would later be made under Disney as a response to the success of Disney TVA's own series that aired on ABC and released as Doug's 1st Movie.

=== 1994 ===
Series	Title	Description
Television series	Youngblood	A half-hour Youngblood animated series was planned for the 1995–96 season on Fox Kids as part of an hour block with a proposed Cyberforce series. The series was being developed by Roustabout Productions, a newly formed animation company. According to Nick Dubois, creative director and co-founder of Roustabout, the series would take a lighthearted approach with tongue-in-cheek humor. A clip was created but the series was never produced due to Fox Kids signing an exclusive deal with Marvel Comics. The clip aired in commercials for Youngblood action figures.
Television series	Cyberforce	A Cyberforce TV series was proposed aside with the Youngblood TV series, but was scrapped alongside it for the same reason.

=== 1995 ===
Series	Title	Description
Feature film	Betty of the Jungle	In 1995, animator Bill Kopp (creator of Fox Kids' Eek! the Cat, The Terrible Thunderlizards and Mad Jack The Pirate) pitched an idea for an original adult animated film called Betty of the Jungle, in which he describes it as a sexy George of the Jungle about jungle warrior woman Betty (set to be voiced by Loni Anderson) and her gun-caring poodle (set to be voiced by Bruce Willis) who battle evil to protect their jungle village. After an animation test and conceptual artwork, Fox Animation declined to approve the project.
Feature film	Dracula	At one time, Fox Animation had planned to produce an animated musical adaptation of Dracula.

=== 1998 ===
Series	Title	Description
Feature film	Santa Calls	In their first partnership with Blue Sky Studios, their first feature film with them was an adaptation of the children's book Santa Calls by William Joyce. The story was to tell of Santa Claus asking three gifted children to help him defeat an army of dark elves and save Christmas.
Feature film	Goosebumps	Back in 1998, Tim Burton was attached to produce a film adaptation of the Goosebumps children's horror books by R.L. Stine. It was going to be produced by 20th Century Fox and DreamWorks Pictures, but was later scrapped because it did not materialize since they could not find a script they liked or determine which book or monster to adapt. Years later, in 2015, Columbia Pictures and Sony Pictures Animation made a Goosebumps film directed by Rob Letterman, along with a sequel in 2018.

=== 1999 ===
Series	Title	Description
Feature film	Inferno: Rebellion in Hell	In 1999, Fox Animation had optioned Barlowe's Inferno by Wayne Barlowe into a potential adult animated film that would follow one man's journey into Hell.
Feature film	Rhapsody	Fox Animation had intended to produce an animated film based on the first installment of the Rhapsody trilogy by Elizabeth Haydon. The story was to tell of a human girl named Rhapsody going on an epic quest with the warrior Achmed and a Firbolg named Grunthor.

== 2000s ==
=== 2000 ===
Series	Title	Description
Feature film	Africa	Fox Animation had been planning to produce an adult animated epic film set in Africa for which animator Will Makra posted conceptual artwork for. Unfortunately, however, the project was cancelled when the studio was shut down due to the financial failure of Titan A.E..
Feature film	Over the Hedge	Fox Animation originally acquired the film rights to the United Media comic strip Over the Hedge for a feature film produced by Fox Animation Studios. The idea of the film was conceived when Don Bluth and Gary Goldman showed the comic strip to its head Chris Meledandri, who was impressed by its humour and acquired rights to the strip. He asked the screenwriting duo of Jeffrey Price and Peter S. Seaman to write the script for the film. In February 2001, due to the financial failure of Titan A.E., it was later acquired by DreamWorks Animation under Jeffrey Katzenberg when Fox placed the film in turnaround as an animated feature, which was released on May 19, 2006.
Feature film	Party Animals	By June 2000, the Farrelly brothers (There's Something About Mary) were developing an animated adaptation of the novel Frisco Pigeon Mambo by C.D. Payne. Seth MacFarlane (Family Guy) was attached to write and direct the project in June 2003.
Feature film	Fathom	By June 2000, Fox planned to adapt the comic book series Fathom.
Feature film	The Little Beauty King	In 2000, Steve Oedekerk was developing The Little Beauty King, which was supposed to be a satirical animated film of the Disney Renaissance films.

=== 2001 ===
Series	Title	Description
Buffyverse	Buffy: The Animated Series	In 2001, Joss Whedon and 20th Century Fox started the development of Buffy the Animated Series, an animated spin-off of Whedon's popular TV show Buffy the Vampire Slayer. Whedon and Jeph Loeb were to produce the show while many actors of the original series were attached to reprise their roles. It was initially planned to be aired in Fox Kids, possibly as early in February 2002, but Fox Kids ceased to broadcast in September 2002. No network wanted to pick up the series, which resulted in the abandonment of this project.

=== 2003 ===
Series	Title	Description
Feature film	The Iguana Brothers	In September 2003, 20th Century Fox and Blue Sky Studios planned to adapt Tony Johnson and Mark Teague's children's book The Iguana Brothers: A Tale of Two Lizards into an animated film.
Feature film	The Wainscott Weasel	In November 2003, 20th Century Fox and Blue Sky Studios planned to adapt Tor Seidler's children's book The Wainscott Weasel into an animated film, but the project was shelved in 2006.

=== 2005 ===
Series	Title	Description
Feature film	Emily the Strange	In 2005, it was reported that 20th Century Fox Animation would make a live action/animated hybrid film adaptation of the titular Dark Horse Comics property, with Chris Meledandri and John Cohen producing it. In 2008, Dark Horse founder, writer and publisher Mike Richardson came on board to produce the film. Meledandri would eventually take it to his own company, Illumination for Universal Pictures in 2011, with Melisa Wallack (the screenwriter for Mirror Mirror) to pen the script for the adaptation on August of that year, while Kealan O’Rourke rewrote the film's script. In December 2016, both Meledandri and Universal abandoned the project, and Dark Horse entered negotiations with Amazon Studios to make an animated film. However, in October 2024, Warner Bros. Pictures Animation and Bad Robot announced their collaboration on a full-length animated feature based on Emily the Strange. The film’s screenplay is being developed by Pamela Ribon, as Bad Robot will produce the film, with Reger serving as executive producer alongside Trevor Duke-Moretz.

=== 2006 ===
Series	Title	Description
Feature film	Sheepish	In October 2006, Fox, Starz Animation, and Odyssey Entertainment announced Sheepish, with Odyssey obtaining the international rights, an CG animated family comedy about the brazen leader of a pack of macho wolves who undergoes karmic retribution when he is transformed into a sheep, to be directed by Daniel St. Pierre and Kevin Johnson, and written by Bart Coughlin. Kristen Bell was also meant to voice a character.

=== 2008 ===
Series	Title	Description
Feature film	Anubis	In April 2008, Fox and Blue Sky acquired the film rights to the fantasy novel The Anubis Tapestry by Bruce Zick for an animated film titled Anubis. David H. Steinberg wrote the first draft for the film. The film was scheduled for release on July 15, 2016, but was pushed back to March 23, 2018, in favor of Ice Age: Collision Course, but it was pulled from its schedule by June 2017. Blue Sky closed in April 2021, ending development on the film.

=== 2009 ===
Series	Title	Description
Feature film	Spore	In October 2009, EA and AIG announced an animated film adaptation of the video game Spore to be produced by Blue Sky Studios. Chris Wedge was attached to direct the proposed film with Greg Erb and Jason Oremland (story writers for The Princess and the Frog and screenwriters for 2022's Reindeer In Here) penning the screenplay.
Feature film	The Magician's Elephant	In August 2009, 20th Century Fox announced an animated adaptation of a novel titled The Magician's Elephant, with Martin Hynes attached to direct. Julia Pistor was also confirmed as a producer of the film. By December 2020, after languishing into development hell for a number of years, Netflix acquired the film rights to the book to develop the animated feature film, with Animal Logic working on the animation. Noah Jupe, Benedict Wong, Pixie Davies, Sian Clifford, Brian Tyree Henry, Mandy Patinkin, Miranda Richardson, Cree Summer, and Lorraine Toussaint were all cast to star in the film. The film was released on March 17, 2023.
Feature film	The Berenstain Bears	A planned Berenstain Bears feature film adaptation was announced in 2009 by 20th Century Fox, 20th Century Fox Animation and Walden Media and director Shawn Levy, whose company 21 Laps was slated to produce the film. The project was envisioned as a comedy with both live action and animated elements, and an original storyline that would combine details from several Berenstain books. According to Levy: "I'd like the film to be un-ironic about its family connections but have a wry comedic sensibility that isn't oblivious to the fact that they're bears". Comparing it to the film Elf, Levy said he thought the Berenstain Bears film would be "witty but never sarcastic". As of January 2012, the project was reportedly in the script phase, but the company's option has since expired.

== 2010s ==
=== 2011 ===
Series	Title	Description
Feature film	Mutts	In 2011, Blue Sky Studios announced a film adaptation of the comic strip, Mutts. Patrick McDonnell and his brother Robert McDonnell were hired to write the script, while Patrick was attached as executive producer. In late 2014, Patrick delivered the final draft of the film script, which was then, according to him, on a drawing board. Blue Sky closed in April 2021, ending development on the film.
Feature film	Mr. Men and Little Miss	By February 2011, 20th Century Fox Animation was developing an animated feature film based on the Mr. Men book series, with Shawn Levy producing the film through his company 21 Laps Entertainment. Fox Animation acquired the film rights to the Mr. Men Little Miss characters in January 2015. In December 2025, Variety reported that new animated film adaptation is in development with StudioCanal and Heyday Films.

=== 2012 ===
Series	Title	Description
Feature film	Cardboard	In September 2012, Fox Animation optioned graphic novelist Doug TenNapel's published Graphix novel Cardboard, with plans for actor Tobey Maguire's Material Pictures, Doug TenNapel and the Gotham Group to be executive producers for the film. Fox planned to have the picture developed under its WedgeWorks subsidiary. WedgeWorks director Chris Wedge (Ice Age) was producing, and considered directing the film as well.
Ology	Alienology	In 2012, Carlos Saldanha, the director of the Ice Age and Rio films, was developing for 20th Century Fox and Blue Sky Studios an animated feature film based on Alienology: The Complete Book of Extraterrestrials. In 2018, Paramount Pictures instead began to develop the live-action film franchise based on all 13 Ology books.
Diary of a Wimpy Kid	Diary of a Wimpy Kid: Cabin Fever	In 2012, Jeff Kinney, the author of the Diary of a Wimpy Kid books, had announced the possibility for an animated film to be based on Diary of a Wimpy Kid: Cabin Fever as the next installment. In an interview for Diary of a Wimpy Kid: Hard Luck, Kinney stated that he was working with Fox on a half-hour special based on Cabin Fever, which was scheduled to air in late 2014. The special was meant to be an animated production developed at 20th Century Fox Animation, and had begun development while Kinney worked in the live-action films. No news emerged regarding the development of the TV special and was presumably canceled. Instead, an animated film adaptation of the book released on Disney+ on December 8, 2023.
Feature film	Fancy Nancy	In 2012, 20th Century Fox, 20th Century Fox Animation Studios and 21 Laps Entertainment announced a live-action film adaptation the book series with Tina Fey and Shawn Levy heading its production team, but nothing came to fruition in the following years since then.

=== 2013 ===
Series	Title	Description
American Dad!	Untitled American Dad! film	During Comic-Con 2013 held in July, American Dad! co-creator Mike Barker revealed its film project which would take place on Roger's planet and may take place in the future. Barker did not announce any specifics as it relates to the nature and type of film he and the rest of the show's creators had in mind for the series, but he strongly suggested that a film is where the show's staff and creators would like to take things. At Comic-Con 2022, co-creator Matt Weitzman revealed that plans for a feature film were scrapped. In August, 2025 during an interview with Comic Book Resources, Matt Weitzman mentioned that the American Dad! movie won't likely happen until they are done with their recent 56 episode renewal.

=== 2014 ===
Series	Title	Description
The Book of Life	Sequels to The Book of Life	Director Jorge Gutierrez revealed in an interview that one of the ideas for the next chapter in the story involves Joaquin and his relationship with his father. The first film was about Manolo, the second was to be about Joaquín and the third one about Maria, conceiving it as a trilogy. By June 2017, Gutierrez and Reel FX Animation began the development on the sequel, but two years later, Gutierrez clarified on Twitter that there are currently no plans for a sequel.

=== 2015 ===
Series	Title	Description
Feature film	Mega Man	By September 2015, Chernin Entertainment and Capcom began developing a Mega Man film with Peter Chernin producing along with Mike Ireland and Ryan Harrigan and David Ready and Michael Finfer overseeing the film. It was unknown whether or not it was going to be set as a live-action/animated film at the time. In July 2017, Henry Joost and Ariel Schulman were hired to write and direct the film with Masi Oka producing. Following The Walt Disney Company's acquisition of 20th Century Fox's parent company, 21st Century Fox in March 2019, the film along with numerous video game-based films in development at Fox were cancelled in August. On October 29, Capcom indicated to investors in a semi-annual report that the film is still in development at Disney. Mattson Tomlin was hired to rewrite the script for Capcom and Chernin Entertainment. In April 2020, Peter Chernin and Chernin Entertainment signed to a non-exclusive first-look feature film producing deal with Netflix. After Disney put the project on turnaround, Netflix acquired it.
Feature film	Amulet	In November 2015, 20th Century Fox acquired the rights to produce a film based on Kazu Kibuishi's book series of the same name, which was previously in development under Warner Bros. A year later on June 20, Aron Coleite signed on to direct. In June 2021, Kazu Kibuishi confirmed on Twitter that the film was cancelled and the film rights had lapsed back to him. On October 17, 2024, Netflix acquired the film rights to Amulet, with Jason Fuchs attached to co-write with Kibuishi (who will also serve as an executive producer), while Shawn Levy, Dan Cohen, and Dan Levine will produce under 21 Laps Entertainment.

=== 2016 ===
Series	Title	Description
Archer	Untitled Archer film	In June 2016, Archer creator and executive producer Matt Thompson and executive producer Casey Willis discussed the possibility of a feature-length film with The Daily Beast. According to Thompson, this discussion happens "once every two years" among Reed and the producers, although work on the project would likely not begin until after the show ends. They cited Jon Hamm as their ideal choice of actor to portray Sterling if it is commissioned as a live-action adaptation. The series would end in December 2023 with its TV movie Into the Cold, ending any plans of an actual feature film adaption.
Feature film	Mouse Guard	20th Century Fox was producing an animated feature film based on the comic book series Mouse Guard by David Petersen. The story was described as a fantasy epic about a group of medieval mice sworn to protect their fellow rodents from dangerous forces. Wes Ball was director while Andy Serkis, Idris Elba, Samson Kayo, Thomas Brodie-Sangster, and Jack Whitehall were attached to star. In April 2019, following Disney's acquisition of 20th Century Fox, the project was cancelled two weeks before production was to begin. In the following June, Ball and concept artist Derek Zabrocki posted pre-visualization artwork and a proof of concept demo reel.
Feature film	The Dam Keeper	By November 2016, Tonko House and Fox Animation were co-producing an animated film based on the Academy Award-nominated short film. However, due to the acquisition of 20th Century Fox to Disney, Kondo and Tsutsumi decided to bring the project back to Tonko House, in which the directors would resume finding a new studio partner.
Feature film	The Royal Rabbits of London	By April 2016, 20th Century Fox Animation was developing The Royal Rabbits of London, based on the book series of the same name by Santa Montefiore and Simon Sebag Montefiore.
Feature film	Zita the Spacegirl	In 2016, Fox Animation acquired the film rights for the Zita the Spacegirl trilogy, written by cartoonist Ben Hatke. The films were to be produced by Chernin Entertainment.

=== 2017 ===
Series	Title	Description
Deadpool	Untitled Deadpool series	In May 2017, FXX placed a series order for an animated series based on Deadpool, to be co-produced by Marvel Television, Marvel Animation, Fox Television Animation, FX Productions, and ABC Signature Studios. Donald Glover and his brother Stephen Glover were announced as showrunners, executive producers, and writers for the series. In late March 2018, FXX decided not to move forward with the series due to creative differences. Stephen Glover later admitted that the "creative difference" in question involved an episode revolving around Taylor Swift which FXX stated was the "last straw" and that they wanted to give Rick and Morty "a run for its money".
Feature film	Frogkisser!	A live-action animated musical film adaptation of Frogkisser! from Blue Sky Studios was announced in 2017, based on the book of the same name by Garth Nix, with Michael McCullers (writer of the Austin Powers films, Baby Mama, and The Boss Baby) to pen the script.
Feature film	The Witch Boy	In May 2017, 20th Century Fox Animation announced a film adaptation of Lee Knox Ostertag's graphic novel The Witch Boy. The story is set in a world where girls are born as witches and boys are born as shapeshifters, and one boy named Aster breaks that by becoming a witch. After Disney bought 20th Century Fox, the project was sold to Netflix Animation, to be an animated musical and animator Minkyu Lee's directorial debut. In April 2024, it was reported that Lee left as director.
Feature film	Escape from Hat	In April 2017, 20th Century Fox Animation announced an animated film adaptation of Adam Kline's fantasy book Escape from Hat with Mark Osborne set to direct and co-write the script with Kline, and Jinko Gotoh producing the film along with Osborne. By November 2018, Netflix acquired the film. In August 2023, it was reported that the film was no longer in development at Netflix Animation.

=== 2018 ===
Series	Title	Description
Feature film	Confessions of an Imaginary Friend	In May 2018, Martino was attached to direct an animated film based on Michelle Cuevas' novel Confessions of an Imaginary Friend, for Blue Sky Studios with Tripper Clancy writing the script. The film was revived in 2021 at Disney Television Animation as part of the promotion of Lisa Fragner after Blue Sky Studios closed that April, and is scheduled for release as a Disney+ original film.
Feature film	Foster	An animated fantasy musical film from Blue Sky Studios was announced in 2018 under the working title Foster, with Tim Federle to pen the script, Marc Platt (La La Land) to produce, Karen Disher and Steve Martino to direct and Pasek and Paul (La La Land, The Greatest Showman and 2019 version of Aladdin) to write the songs for the film. It was scheduled to release on March 5, 2021. However, following Disney's acquisition of Fox in May 2019, the film was pulled from the release schedule. Blue Sky closed in April 2021, ending development of the film.

== See also ==
- List of unproduced Disney animated projects
- List of unproduced DreamWorks Animation projects
- List of unproduced film projects based on Marvel Comics
- List of unproduced films based on Marvel Comics imprints publications
- List of unproduced 20th Century Fox projects based on Marvel Comics
