= Jon Poll =

American film director

- Born: 1958 (age 67–68)
- Education: University of Southern California
- Occupations: Director, editor, producer
- Years active: 1982–present
- Father: Martin Poll

Jon Poll (born 1958) is an American film director, editor and producer, best known for his directorial debut with the 2007 film Charlie Bartlett.

== Career ==
Poll is the one of three sons of the late film producer, Martin Poll. He graduated from the University of Southern California's film school in 1981 before becoming a film editor. Between 1982 and 2004, he edited eighteen films, including Weeds (1987), Fire Birds (1990), Cabin Boy (1994), Austin Powers: The Spy Who Shagged Me (1999), Meet the Parents (2000), Austin Powers in Goldmember (2002), Scary Movie 3 (2003) and Meet the Fockers (2004). He was also a co-producer on the television series TV 101, Eerie, Indiana and the film Meet the Fockers, and was an executive producer on The 40-Year-Old Virgin.

Poll made his directorial debut in 2007 with the teen comedy film Charlie Bartlett. He read screenwriter Gustin Nash's film adaptation of C. D. Payne's 1993 novel Youth in Revolt and asked director Jay Roach—with whom he had previously worked on five films—if he had heard of Nash. Roach explained that he had been slated to direct another of Nash's screenplays, Charlie Bartlett, but was forced to back out of the job on the same day. Roach recommended that Poll take the role as director; Poll then pitched himself to the film's producers and was hired. Poll co-produced Sacha Baron Cohen's 2009 mockumentary film Brüno.

== Personal life ==
His father is film producer Martin Poll.

== Filmography ==
Editor
Year	Film	Director	Notes
1987	Weeds	John D. Hancock	
1990	Fire Birds	David Green	
1990	Captain America	Albert Pyun	
1991	Wild Hearts Can't Be Broken	Steve Miner	First collaboration with Steve Miner
1992	Forever Young	Steve Miner	Second collaboration with Steve Miner
1994	Cabin Boy	Adam Resnick	
1994	Camp Nowhere	Jonathan Prince	
1996	Dunston Checks In	Ken Kwapis	First collaboration with Ken Kwapis
1997	The Beautician and the Beast	Ken Kwapis	Second collaboration with Ken Kwapis
1998	Krippendorf's Tribe	Todd Holland	
1999	Austin Powers: The Spy Who Shagged Me	Jay Roach	First collaboration with Jay Roach
1999	Mystery, Alaska	Jay Roach	Second collaboration with Jay Roach
2000	Meet the Parents	Jay Roach	Third collaboration with Jay Roach
2001	Monkeybone	Henry Selick	
2002	Death to Smoochy	Danny DeVito	
2002	Austin Powers in Goldmember	Jay Roach	Fourth collaboration with Jay Roach
2003	Scary Movie 3	David Zucker	
2004	Meet the Fockers	Jay Roach	Fifth collaboration with Jay Roach
2010	Dinner for Schmucks	Jay Roach	Sixth collaboration with Jay Roach
2012	The Campaign	Jay Roach	Seventh collaboration with Jay Roach
2015	Unfinished Business	Ken Scott	
2017	The Greatest Showman	Michael Gracey	
2019	Bombshell	Jay Roach	Eighth collaboration with Jay Roach
2022	God's Time	Daniel Antebi	
2022	Father of the Bride	Gary Alazraki	
2023	The Color Purple	Blitz Bazawule	
2025	The Roses	Jay Roach	Ninth collaboration with Jay Roach
2026	Madden	David O. Russell	

Editorial department
Year	Film	Director	Role
1984	Gimme an 'F'	Paul Justman	Assistant editor
1993	Wayne's World 2	Stephen Surjik	Additional film editor
1995	Lord of Illusions	Clive Barker	Additional editor
2003	Master and Commander: The Far Side of the World	Peter Weir	Additional editor
2014	Muppets Most Wanted	James Bobin	Additional editor
2016	Mike and Dave Need Wedding Dates	Jake Szymanski	Additional editor
2016	Keeping Up with the Joneses	Greg Mottola	Additional editor
2017	Power Rangers	Dean Israelite	Additional editor
2018	Uncle Drew	Charles Stone III	Additional editor

Director
Year	Film
2007	Charlie Bartlett

Producer
Year	Film	Director	Credit
2004	Meet the Fockers	Jay Roach	Co-producer
2005	The 40-Year-Old Virgin	Judd Apatow	Executive producer
2009	Brüno	Larry Charles	Co-producer
2010	Dinner for Schmucks	Jay Roach	Executive producer
2012	The Campaign	Jay Roach	Executive producer
2014	Playing It Cool	Justin Reardon	Co-executive producer

Second unit director or assistant director
Year	Film	Director	Role
1984	Gimme an 'F'	Paul Justman	Second assistant director
2004	Meet the Fockers	Jay Roach	Second unit director
2008	The Love Guru	Marco Schnabel	Second unit director
2010	Dinner for Schmucks	Jay Roach	Second unit director; Title sequence director

Thanks
Year	Film	Director	Role
2008	Drillbit Taylor	Steven Brill	The producers wish to thank
2009	Land of the Lost	Brad Silberling	Special thanks

Shorts

Editor
Year	Film	Director
1982	The Tree	Mark Allan Kaplan; Himself

Cinematographer
Year	Film	Director
1982	The Tree	Mark Allan Kaplan; Himself

Director
Year	Film
1982	The Tree
2013	The Magic Bracelet

Writer
Year	Film	Director
1982	The Tree	Mark Allan Kaplan; Himself

TV movies

Editor
Year	Film	Director
1988	Steal the Sky	John D. Hancock
1996	Mistrial	Heywood Gould
2020	Coastal Elites	Jay Roach

TV series

Editor
Year	Title	Notes
1991	Eerie, Indiana	3 episodes
2015	The Brink	5 episodes
2016	Angie Tribeca	1 episode

Director
Year	Title	Notes
2015	The Brink	1 episode
2016	Angie Tribeca	1 episode
2016	Still the King	3 episodes

Producer
Year	Title	Credit
1988−89	TV 101	Co-associate producer; Co-producer
1991−92	Eerie, Indiana	Co-producer; Producer
2015	The Brink	Co-producer
