= Portia Doubleday =

American actress

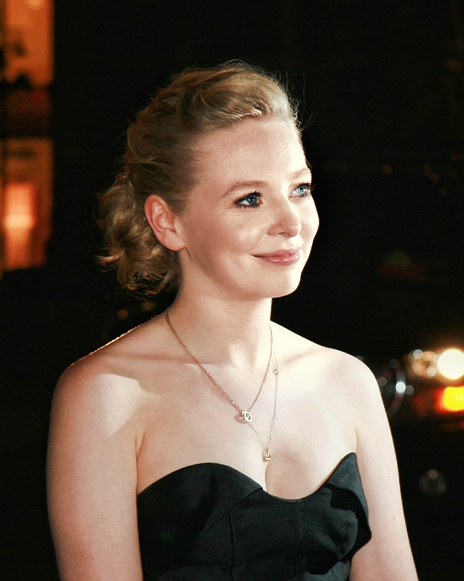
- Doubleday at the 2009 Toronto International Film Festival
- Born: June 22, 1988 (age 38); Los Angeles, California, U.S.
- Occupation: Actress
- Years active: 1998; 2009–present
- Parent(s): Frank Doubleday; Christina Hart
- Family: Kaitlin Doubleday (sister)

Portia Doubleday (born June 22, 1988) is an American actress. She is best known for her roles as Sheeni Saunders in the film Youth in Revolt (2009) and as Angela Moss in the USA Network television drama Mr. Robot (2015–2019). In 2026, Doubleday played a featured role in Aaron Sorkin's The Social Reckoning.

== Early life and education ==
Born and raised in Los Angeles, Portia Doubleday is the younger of two daughters of Christina Hart and Frank Doubleday. She grew up in a show business family: her parents are former professional actors, and her older sister Kaitlin is also an actress. Her mother now works in the entertainment industry as a writer and producer of plays.

Doubleday attended the Los Angeles Center for Enriched Studies, a magnet school in west Los Angeles. She played soccer for 12 years and described herself as a tomboy.

== Career ==
Doubleday first appeared in a commercial for Goldfish crackers at age eight and had a small role in the film Legend of the Mummy (1998). Her parents insisted that she finish high school before pursuing a career in acting.

After graduating high school, Doubleday was cast in the pilot episode of United States of Tara, a television series created by Diablo Cody. Doubleday played 15-year-old Kate, the daughter of Toni Collette's character. Doubleday was replaced by Brie Larson when the series' creative team chose to go in a different direction with the character. She appeared in the short film 18 in 2009, about a girl dealing with the end of her mother's life.

Doubleday starred opposite Michael Cera in the 2009 teen comedy Youth in Revolt, based on the 1993 novel of the same name by C.D. Payne. Doubleday described her character as "mean" and "really complex" to the Los Angeles Times. She plays Sheeni Saunders, an imaginative girl with a dreary life who meets Michael Cera's character while on a family vacation. The film was directed by Miguel Arteta and premiered at the 2009 Toronto International Film Festival.

In 2010, Doubleday starred in the drama Almost Kings (formerly known as Touchback) directed by Marvin Jarrett (the founder of Nylon magazine). She appeared regularly in the ABC network comedy Mr. Sunshine, a midseason replacement for the 2010–2011 season. In 2013, she played a brief role in Her as a sex surrogate.

In September 2014, it was announced that Doubleday had joined the main cast of the USA Network pilot for the TV series Mr. Robot. Doubleday plays Malek's character's childhood friend and current co-worker, Angela Moss. The first episode of the series premiered on June 24, 2015. She appeared in all four seasons of the show, the final three premiering in July 2016, October 2017, and October 2019 respectively.

In November 2018, it was announced that Doubleday had joined the cast of the film Fantasy Island, an adaptation of the show of the same name. The movie was released on February 14, 2020.

Doubleday played a radicalized woman in the Aaron Sorkin film about Frances Haugen's testimony against Facebook, The Social Reckoning, released in the U.S. on October 9, 2026.

== Personal life ==
As of 2018, Doubleday was living in Los Angeles.

== Filmography ==
=== Film ===
Year	Title	Role	Notes
1998	Legend of the Mummy	Young Margaret	
2009	18	Becky	Short film
2009	Youth in Revolt	Sheeni Saunders	
2010	In Between Days	Lindley	Short film
2010	Almost Kings	Lizzie	
2011	Big Mommas: Like Father, Like Son	Jasmine Lee	
2012	K-11	Butterfly	
2012	Howard Cantour.com	Dakota Zearing	Short film
2013	Her	Isabella	
2013	Carrie	Chris Hargensen	
2015	After the Ball	Kate "Katie" Kassell / Nate Ganymede	
2020	Fantasy Island	Sloane Maddison	
2026	The Social Reckoning	Kayleigh	

=== Television ===
Year	Title	Role	Notes
2011	Mr. Sunshine	Heather	Recurring role; 12 episodes
2015–2019	Mr. Robot	Angela Moss	Main role; 34 episodes
