= Youth in Revolt (film) =

2009 film by Miguel Arteta

- Theatrical release poster
- Directed by: Miguel Arteta
- Written by: Gustin Nash
- Based on: Youth in Revolt by C. D. Payne
- Produced by: David Permut
- Starring: Michael Cera; Portia Doubleday; Jean Smart; Mary Kay Place; Justin Long; Fred Willard; Ray Liotta; Steve Buscemi
- Cinematography: Chuy Chávez
- Edited by: Pamela Martin; Andy Keir
- Music by: John Swihart
- Production companies: Permut; Shangri-La Entertainment
- Distributed by: Dimension Films
- Release dates: October 19, 2009 (DAFF); January 8, 2010 (United States)
- Running time: 89 minutes
- Country: United States
- Language: English
- Budget: $18 million
- Box office: $19.7 million

Youth in Revolt is a 2009 American romantic comedy-drama film directed by Miguel Arteta and written by Gustin Nash. Based on C. D. Payne's 1993 epistolary novel, the film stars Michael Cera and Portia Doubleday, with Jean Smart, Justin Long, Ray Liotta, and Steve Buscemi in supporting roles.

The film follows shy and lonely teenager Nick (Cera) desperate to lose his virginity. While on a trailer park holiday with his mother and her boyfriend, he meets an attractive girl (Doubleday) and is immediately smitten. When the two are separated Nick must learn how to rebel in order to be with the girl he loves.

== Plot ==
Shy teenager Nick Twisp lives with his mother, Estelle, and her boyfriend, Jerry, in Oakland, California. After selling a faulty car to a group of sailors, Jerry takes Estelle and Nick to a trailer park in Clearlake where Nick meets Sheeni Saunders, a young woman his age, interested in French culture and sharing Nick's musical taste. Despite her boyfriend, Trent Preston, they become romantically involved. Nick gets a dog for her named Albert (after Albert Camus), but Albert rips up the family's property and Sheeni's parents ban it from the house.

Before Nick returns to Oakland, Sheeni promises to arrange a job in Ukiah for Nick's father, George, while Nick agrees to get his mother to kick him out so he can return to Sheeni. In Oakland, Nick creates an alter-ego named François Dillinger, a suave, rebellious troublemaker. Immediately after, Jerry dies of a heart attack.

Under François' influence, Nick mouths off to his mom and her new boyfriend, police officer Lance Wescott. Nick takes Jerry's Lincoln, and crashes into a restaurant, starting a fire. Lance agrees to lie and report the car stolen in return for Nick moving out and living with his father. In Ukiah, Nick phones Sheeni and tells her he blew up "half of Berkeley" to return. Her mother overhears this and ships her to a French boarding school in Santa Cruz, forbidding Nick ever to see her again.

Nick befriends Vijay Joshi, and they take Vijay's grandmother's car to visit Sheeni. They sneak into Sheeni's room, Nick meets Bernice in the bathroom, and he claims Trent said terrible things about her. Later, Bernice brings the matron to the room and the boys flee. On the way home, the car dies and Nick calls Mr. Ferguson, his father's idealist neighbor, to pick them up; telling Ferguson that Vijay is an illegal immigrant whom Nick is trying to "free from persecution".

When he returns home, Nick meets Sheeni's older brother, Paul, who tells him that she will be returning home at Thanksgiving and invites him. Nick sends Bernice letters asking her to slip sedatives into Sheeni's drinks to make her sleep in class, getting Sheeni expelled. Nick finds Lacey, George's 25-year-old girlfriend, Paul, and Ferguson, in his living room, high on mushrooms, and Nick joins them. When George finds them, Paul punches George. Lacey leaves the house to live with Paul. On Thanksgiving Day, Nick receives a call from his mother explaining Lance left and will not cover for him anymore. Then, at Sheeni's, Trent unexpectedly arrives and tells them about Nick's letters to Bernice; Sheeni is horrified and Nick leaves.

Nick steals his father's car to escape the police, then removes his clothes and drives the car into a shallow lake in front of the police station. He gets a wig and dress to impersonate one of Sheeni's "friends". He fools Mr. and Mrs. Saunders, going up to Sheeni's room. Upstairs, Nick tells Sheeni that he understands what loneliness is like, and that everything he has done (burning down Berkeley, destroying his parents' cars and having her sedated) was all so that they wouldn't have to be alone anymore. Sheeni forgives Nick, and they have sex, finally achieving Nick's dream of losing his virginity. Trent barges in, telling them he's brought the police. Nick and Trent fight until the police come to arrest Nick. Nick asks Sheeni to wait for him; she reassures him that he will only be in juvenile detention for three months.

The animated closing credits show Nick in jail with François helping him. When Nick is released, Sheeni shows up in a car and they drive away into the sky towards the Paris skyline, as various characters appear to make amends and give them their blessing.

== Cast ==
- Michael Cera as Nick Twisp / François Dillinger
- Portia Doubleday as Sheeni Saunders
- Jean Smart as Estelle Twisp
- Zach Galifianakis as Jerry
- Erik Knudsen as Lefty
- Adhir Kalyan as Vijay Joshi
- Steve Buscemi as George Twisp
- Fred Willard as Mr. Ferguson
- Ari Graynor as Lacey
- Ray Liotta as Lance Wescott
- Justin Long as Paul Saunders
- Rooney Mara as Taggarty
- Jade Fusco as Bernice Lynch
- M. Emmet Walsh as Mr. Saunders
- Mary Kay Place as Mrs. Saunders
- Jonathan Bradford Wright as Trent Preston
- Michael Collins as Old Man

== Release ==
=== Box office ===
Youth in Revolt opened on January 8, 2010 in 1,873 theaters and grossed $6.9 million in its opening weekend, ranking #9 in the domestic box office. By the end of its run on March 25, the film had grossed $15.3 million domestically and $4.4 million overseas for a worldwide total of $19.7 million against an $18 million budget.

=== Critical reception ===
Review aggregator Rotten Tomatoes reports that 66% of critics have given the film a positive review based on 172 reviews, with an average rating of 6.30/10. The consensus states: "It may not entirely do its source material justice, but Miguel Arteta's Youth in Revolt is a fun, funny comic romp that lets Michael Cera stretch a little and introduces filmgoers to a major find in Portia Doubleday." On Metacritic, based on 35 critics' reviews, the film has a 63/100 rating, indicating "generally favorable reviews".

=== Home media ===
Youth in Revolt was released on DVD and Blu-ray on June 15, 2010. Special features include deleted scenes, animated sequences, an audio commentary by Arteta and Cera, and audition footage.

== Soundtrack ==
Youth in Revolt: Original Motion Picture Soundtrack

Soundtrack album by Various Artists
- Released: January 5, 2010
- Length: 29:39
- Label: Lakeshore Records
- Producers: Miguel Arteta, Anne Litt

Professional ratings
Review scores
Source	Rating
Allmusic	3/5 stars

Youth in Revolt: Original Motion Picture Soundtrack was released on January 5, 2010 by Lakeshore Records. The film itself contained 19 songs, leaving 9 out of the official soundtrack. The score was composed by John Swihart who also did the score for Napoleon Dynamite and The Brothers Solomon.

No.	Title	Artist(s)	Length
1.	"When U Love Somebody"	Fruit Bats	4:31
2.	"I Willn't Be a Prisoner"	Little Wings	1:21
3.	"Les Cactus"	Jacques Dutronc	2:41
4.	"I Have a Boyfriend"	Michael Cera	0:39
5.	"What's Up Fatlip?"	Fatlip	3:22
6.	"Popular Mechanics for Lovers"	Beulah	3:03
7.	"Light of Love"	Fleshpot	2:30
8.	"Keys"	John Swihart	0:46
9.	"Happiness Trigger"	Fleshpot	3:06
10.	"T'ain't What You Do (It's the Way That You Do It)"	Fun Boy Three & Bananarama	2:52
11.	"My Romance"	Jo Stafford	3:24
12.	"Nick and Sheeni Make Love"	John Swihart	1:24
