= The Little Prince (2015 film) =

2015 animated fantasy adventure film

- French theatrical release poster
- French: Le Petit Prince
- Directed by: Mark Osborne
- Screenplay by: Irena Brignull; Bob Persichetti
- Based on: The Little Prince by Antoine de Saint-Exupéry
- Produced by: Aton Soumache; Dimitri Rassam; Alexis Vonarb
- Starring: Jeff Bridges; Rachel McAdams; Paul Rudd; Bud Cort; Marion Cotillard; Benicio del Toro; James Franco; Ricky Gervais; Paul Giamatti; Riley Osborne; Albert Brooks; Mackenzie Foy
- Edited by: Carole Kravetz Aykanian; Matt Landon
- Music by: Hans Zimmer; Richard Harvey
- Production companies: ON Animation Studios; Orange Studio; LPPTV; M6 Films; Lucky Red
- Distributed by: Paramount Pictures (France and selected territories); Lucky Red (Italy)
- Release dates: 22 May 2015 (Cannes); 29 July 2015 (France)
- Running time: 108 minutes
- Countries: France; Italy
- Language: English
- Budget: $77.5 million
- Box office: $97.6 million

The Little Prince (French: Le Petit Prince; Italian: Il piccolo principe) is a 2015 English-language French-Italian animated fantasy adventure comedy-drama film directed by Mark Osborne and based on the 1943 novella of the same name by Antoine de Saint-Exupéry. The film stars the voices of Jeff Bridges, Rachel McAdams, Paul Rudd, Bud Cort, Marion Cotillard, Benicio del Toro, James Franco, Ricky Gervais, Paul Giamatti, Riley Osborne, Albert Brooks and Mackenzie Foy. It is the first adaptation as a full-length animated feature of The Little Prince.

The film relates the story of the book using stop motion animation, which is woven into a CGI animated framing narrative about a young girl who has just met the book's now-elderly aviator narrator, who tells her the story of his meeting with the Little Prince in the Sahara desert. The film's animation was provided by studios ON Animation Studios and Mikros Image.

The film premiered at the Cannes Film Festival on 22 May 2015 in an out-of-competition screening, followed by a theatrical release in France on 29 July 2015 by Paramount Pictures and in Italy on 1 January 2016 by Lucky Red. The film was originally set to be released theatrically in the United States on 18 March 2016 before budget cuts halted the release; Netflix later acquired the US, UK, and Australia distribution rights and released it on 5 August 2016.

The film has received positive reviews, earning praise for its style of animation and homage paid to the source material, and earned $97.6 million on a €75 million budget, becoming the most successful French animated film abroad of all time.

The film was dedicated to Jake Eberts, as well as Mark Osborne's mother, who both died before the film was released.

== Plot ==
A single mother and her young daughter move to a new neighborhood. The mother imposes a coaching life plan for the girl that leaves no time for playing or making friends, all for her to enroll at the prestigious Werth Academy. The girl, however, becomes distracted by her elderly retired Aviator neighbor, who tells her the story of the "Little Prince", a boy he claims to have encountered after crash-landing in the Sahara. As soon as they met, the boy revealed he needed a sheep. Lacking drawing skills, the Aviator drew him a box containing a sheep, satisfying the Little Prince, and they became friends.

The Little Prince's home is "Asteroid B-612", which is covered in baobab sprouts. After clearing away the sprouts, the Little Prince discovered and nurtured a rose into maturity. Despite becoming his friend, she was selfish. Both being too young to know how to love each other, they separated. The Little Prince started traveling away from his asteroid. During his journey, he meets adults from other asteroids, such as a King, a Conceited Man, and a wealthy Businessman. The Little Prince eventually lands on Earth, where he befriends a red fox. The Fox later says goodbye to the Little Prince, advising him to always see with his heart. The Aviator gives the girl a stuffed Fox as a gift, telling her that he will leave soon to go find the Little Prince. Infuriated that she has not been following the plan, the mother redoubles the girl's assignments.

Nevertheless, the girl continues to read the story of the Little Prince, secretly visiting the Aviator to find out how it ends. The Aviator reveals that the Little Prince succumbed to a venomous snake bite to be reunited with his beloved Rose. Although the Aviator assures her that he believes the Little Prince succeeded, the girl, upset by the dark ending, wishes that she had never met the Aviator or heard the story. She tries to forget about the Little Prince and focuses on her assignments.

Towards the summer's end, the Aviator is hospitalised. Deciding to put things right, the girl sets off in search of the Little Prince. Sneaking into the aviator's yard, the girl, accompanied by her now-conscious stuffed Fox and The Little Prince's story pages, flies the Aviator's now-fixed plane into space. They find all the stars gone while landing on an asteroid populated by workaholic adults owned by the Businessman. He holds all the stars to power his asteroid and belongings (including his employees). After encountering a policeman and an elevator operator who turn out to be the Conceited Man and the King, they find the Little Prince. To their surprise, he has become "Mr. Prince", an anxious adult who works as a janitor for the Businessman, having no recollection of his past.

Mr. Prince takes the girl to an "academy" where she is to be "reconditioned" as an adult via a machine controlled by a Teacher. Recognizing the drawing of his sheep's box from the Aviator's pages, Mr. Prince begins to regain his memories and saves the girl from the same fate that he had by putting the Teacher in the machine instead.

They escape from the Businessman together and liberate all of the stars from his glass vault, which return to their rightful place in the sky. The girl and the Fox then take Mr. Prince back to B-612, which is overgrown with dead and withered baobabs, and, amidst the plants, they find the Rose dead. However, after seeing her image in the sunrise, Mr. Prince turns back to his younger self, and the baobabs disappear, restoring his hope.

The girl and the Fox (once again an inanimate toy) return home. The next morning, she and her mother visit the Aviator in the hospital. The girl apologizes and gives him the formerly loose pages bound together as a book, along with all the formerly missing parts filled in. The girl later begins her studies at Werth Academy and reconciles with her mother. Both of them stargaze one night, while the Little Prince and the Aviator are heard laughing together on Asteroid B-612.

During a mid-credits scene, the girl begins a lecture presentation about the Little Prince's story by re-creating the elephant drawing for her classmates on her first day of school, and explaining that it isn't really a hat.

== Voice cast ==
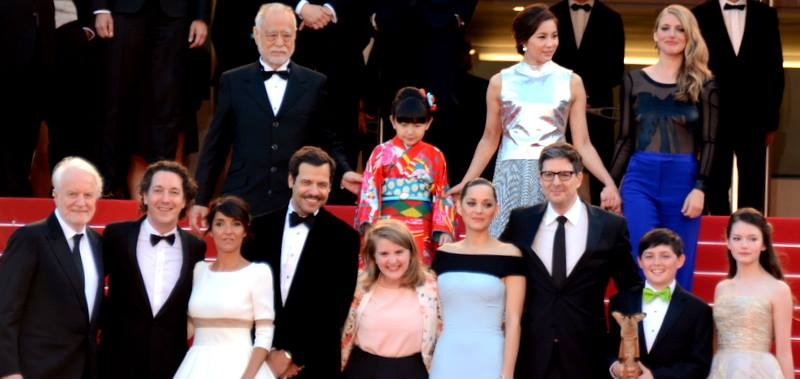
The film's crew at the Cannes Film Festival: (from bottom right) Mackenzie Foy, Riley Osborne, Mark Osborne, Marion Cotillard and other actors who provided the French and Japanese voices.

- Riley Osborne as the Little Prince, an eternally young boy and resident of "Asteroid B612", a small asteroid roughly the same size as him.
  - Paul Rudd as Mr. Prince, the adult Little Prince who has forgotten his own childhood and becomes an anxious, incompetent janitor for the Businessman.
- Mackenzie Foy as the Little Girl, a smart, feisty, and precocious girl with a kind heart. She has a very inquisitive mind and struggles to balance growing up and basking in her childhood.
- Jeff Bridges as the Aviator, an eccentric and retired aviator who befriended the Little Prince in the Sahara Desert and acts as a mentor to the Little Girl.
- Rachel McAdams as the Mother, a busy, sensible, loving and committed mother who cares for her Little Girl.
- James Franco as the Fox, a red fox whom the Little Prince cares for and tames, and who eventually becomes one of his many friends on Earth.
  - Vincent Cassel provides the French voice of the Fox in the French dub of the film.
- Marion Cotillard as the Rose, a bright and beautiful rose whom the Little Prince cares for and talks to.
  - Cotillard also provides the French voice of the Rose in the French dub of the film.
- Benicio del Toro as the Snake, a sly and venomous snake whom the Little Prince meets and is instantly wary of.
- Albert Brooks as the Businessman, an arrogant and greedy businessperson who owns the stars in the sky and generates money to buy more stars.
- Paul Giamatti as the Academy Teacher, a slim, tall, and deceptive teacher who operates an "Academy", a place where children are transformed into workaholic adults.
- Bud Cort as the King, an unreliable king of an asteroid and whom the Little Prince visits. He becomes an elevator operator for the Businessman later in the film.
- Ricky Gervais as the Conceited Man, a man who conceives a personality and sticks to it. He becomes a police officer for the Businessman later in the film.
- Jacquie Barnbrook as the Nurse, a nurse in the hospital where the Aviator is hospitalized.
- Marcel Bridges as the Concerned Neighbor, a serious neighbor who is, along with his wife, curious at the Aviator's attitudes.
- Jeffy Branion as the Policeman, a police officer who repeatedly arrests and detains the Aviator.

== Production ==
=== Development ===
On 14 October 2010, Kung Fu Panda co-director and More creator Mark Osborne was hired and set to direct The Little Prince based on the 1943 novel of the same name. Irena Brignull (writer of The Boxtrolls) and Bob Persichetti wrote the script for the film based on a story conceived by Mark Osborne. Aton Soumache, Alexis Vonarb and Dimitri Rassam produced the film with the budget of $70‒80 million for release in 2015.

The film features a framing device not present in the novel with a schoolgirl discovering The Little Prince through a reclusive elderly neighbour. Mark Osborne made the film's hero a little girl after research from the Geena Davis Institute on Gender in Media revealed the gender disparity among characters in animated films. She represents "the spirit of adulthood", according to Osborne. "In animation, it always had to be boy-centric. Right now there seems to be a changing of the tide but these things don't happen overnight. These movies take years to make, so back when I was first pushing to make the little girl the main character, it was seen as quite revolutionary", Osborne recalled in April 2015.

The film uses computer animation for the girl's world and stop-motion animation for the world of The Little Prince as she imagines it. Development and storyboarding of the film was completed in Paris. The team then moved to Montreal for the final phases of animation, lighting, colour and production to maximise the tax benefits offered to a French-Canadian project, a co-venture between Onyx Entertainment in Paris, Mediaset and Lucky Red in Italy, and Mikros Image Canada in Montreal. One of the film's associate producers is Brice Garnier from Canada's Kaibou Production. Kaibou service rendered Line production and service production (3D animation and stop motion). Studio partners were Studio Mikros Image Canada, Toutenkartoon Canada, and Technicolor (picture and sound post-production). Kaibou also provided financing through tax credits, gap financing, and local taxes.

Osborne was pitching the film to actors, artists, and distributors all over the world using what he called a "magic suitcase" full of hand-made visual aids specifically created to communicate the tone and passion for the project. Model maker Joe Schmidt (the modeler of Coraline) created this suitcase, which held the art book, and told the story of the film visually. Schmidt had created a snapshot of Osborne's vision for the film. A constellation of tiny planets and stars lit up on one side, a giant art book of illustrations filled the other. From somewhere deep inside the case, Osborne pulled out two large white circles that held slides that when placed up to each eye displayed 3D images of stop-motion puppets. Then Osborne started flipping switches. In no time, a one-way mirror slid away to reveal a hidden chamber holding a collection of yellowed pages below. It was a mock-up of Saint-Exupéry's original manuscript, a key plot point in Osborne's film. In four years, Osborne pitched the film close to 400 times.

=== Casting ===
On 5 June 2013, it was announced that James Franco, Marion Cotillard, Mackenzie Foy, Benicio del Toro, Paul Giamatti, Rachel McAdams and Jeff Bridges had joined the film. Albert Brooks joined the cast on 12 September to voice The Businessman, a villain.

Thanks to Osborne's emotionally engaging pitch and the global popularity of Saint-Exupéry's book, a group of A-list actors were able to be recruited to lend their voices to the film's characters. As Osborne explained, "It began with Jeff Bridges. He was our first and only choice to play the Aviator, so after a great deal of time trying to get to him, I finally got the chance to go to his home in Santa Barbara to talk to him directly. He was blown away by the pitch, and it really put us on the road to assembling the perfect cast." As Bridges recalls, he was instantly drawn to the role of the Aviator. "Mark gave me this incredible pitch, brought this suitcase with him which showed me what the movie was going to be about. We shared the same concern, which was if you simply just move around these iconic characters like the book, it might not do justice to the work. He had this great other story, which treated the book as almost another character in the movie. It's a great way to pay tribute to this classic book, so I was excited and thrilled to be part of it."

In the early stages of production, Mark Osborne's daughter Maddie and his son Riley, helped by providing the temporary scratch voices for the roles of the Little Girl and the Little Prince. His daughter got older and her voice began to change, so she had to be replaced by the 12-year-old Mackenzie Foy. Osborne's son Riley was kept as the voice of The Little Prince because they never found anyone who did a better job than him. "He was 11 at the time, and was very natural in the part so we kept him as the Prince!", Osborne said.

To voice the complex role of the Little Girl's Mother, the filmmakers approached Rachel McAdams. The Little Prince marks the first time McAdams has lent her voice to an animated project. "I was so excited to be part of this movie, and I loved Kung Fu Panda, so I knew our director Mark [Osborne] was going to do a wonderful job with the adaptation. I couldn't have asked for a better introduction to animation." McAdams says it was important for her to connect with the material. "I play the Little Girl's Mother, who is a working single mum. She has this massive, intricate life plan for her daughter and wants her to follow the rules to a tee. The Mother is a little highly strung, but she means well. She and her daughter are a real team until the Little Girl drifts away."

=== Music ===
The film's score was composed by Hans Zimmer (who had previously worked with Osborne on Kung Fu Panda) and Richard Harvey. Camille was featured in the film's soundtrack. Lily Allen's cover version of Keane's "Somewhere Only We Know" appeared in the French trailer, but is not featured in the soundtrack.

Yumi Matsutoya wrote the theme song for the Japanese release of the film, titled "Kidzukazu Sugita Hatsukoi."

== Marketing ==
On 11 September 2014, Warner Bros. Pictures Japan released a teaser from the film. The first trailer in French was released by Paramount Pictures on 8 December 2014. The first trailer in English was released on 12 December 2014. The first official English trailer and the first poster for the film were released on 20 April 2015. eOne Canada released a new trailer on 13 November 2015. The first full American trailer was released by both Paramount Pictures and Netflix on 25 November 2015 and 26 May 2016, respectively. For the Japanese release of the film, a one-shot manga adaptation of the film was published in the magazine Ribon (December 2015 issue). The author is Kyoko Kimura. She added her own original touches to the main character's character and other aspects.

== Release ==
The Little Prince premiered out of competition at the Cannes Film Festival on 22 May 2015. The Little Prince made its US premiere at the Santa Barbara Film Festival on 3 February 2016. It was the first animated film to open the Santa Barbara Film Festival's Big Surprise Celebration since the exhibition started in 1985.

Wild Bunch oversaw international film sales. The film was released theatrically in France on 29 July 2015 by Paramount Pictures and in Italy on 1 January 2016 by Lucky Red. It was released by Entertainment One in Quebec on 12 February 2016 and in the rest of Canada on 11 March. In the United Kingdom, Australia and New Zealand, where the film was originally picked up by The Weinstein Company, it was released on Netflix on 5 August 2016. Warner Bros. Pictures handled distribution in Austria, Germany and Japan.

The film was to be released theatrically by Paramount in the United States on 18 March 2016 in RealD 3D, taking over the original release date of Monster Trucks. However, on 11 March, a week away from its release, Paramount dropped the planned release for the region. According to Cartoon Brew, Paramount left because the French producers did not pay an additional, previously agreed $20 million for the North American prints and advertising budget, though they still retained the distribution rights in said region. Netflix and Paramount eventually reached an agreement to distribute the film as the first animated Netflix Original, and released the film in North America on 5 August 2016. Due to Netflix's expiring distribution license, the film was quietly removed from the service in the US in May 2021, and the rights reverted to Paramount Pictures.

=== Home media ===
The Little Prince was released on DVD and Blu-ray on 9 February 2021 by Paramount Home Entertainment, six years after its worldwide release.

== Reception ==
=== Box office ===
The Little Prince grossed $12.1 million in France and $97.6 million worldwide. It became the most successful French animated film abroad of all time.

In its opening week in France, the film earned $3.3 million from 727 screens, debuting at number two at the French box office. In its second weekend, it grossed $1.4 million (down 41%) from 830 screens for a two weekend total of $5.5 million.

The film debuted at number two in Brazil, behind Mission: Impossible – Rogue Nation, with 330,000 tickets sold. In its second weekend, it topped the box office charts, with over 851,000 tickets sold, making history in Brazil as the first non-American animated film to lead the box office in the country. The film kept the first place at the Brazilian box office for three consecutive weeks. As of 5 October, the film has grossed over R$27 million (US$7.14 million) and as of 18 October, it reached over 2 million admissions in Brazil.

The film opened in China on 16 October, where it grossed $10.9 million in its opening weekend ranking third behind Ant-Man and Goodbye Mr. Loser. It grossed a total of $20.9 million in 10 days and by its third weekend, it had grossed US$24 million. It grossed a total of CN¥158.45 million in China, with the country being the largest territory for the film. It was number-one in its second weekend in Japan.

=== Critical response ===
The film has received positive reviews, earning praise for its style of animation and homage paid to the source material. On the review aggregator website Rotten Tomatoes, the film holds an approval rating of 92% based on 96 reviews, with an average rating of 7.2/10. The website's critics consensus reads, "Beautifully animated and faithful to the spirit of its classic source material, The Little Prince is a family-friendly treat that anchors thrilling visuals with a satisfying story."

On Metacritic, the film has a score of 70 out of 100, based on 23 critics, indicating "generally favourable reviews". Furthermore, The Sydney Morning Herald reinforces positive reviews on the film, stating "it is deeply personal and profoundly moving, a sensitive and affecting portrait of humanity".

=== Accolades ===
Year	Award	Category	Recipient(s)	Result	Ref(s)
2016	Austin Film Critics Association	Best Animated Film	The Little Prince	Nominated	
2016	César Awards	Best Animated Film	Mark Osborne, Dimitri Rassam, Aton Soumache, Alexis Vonarb and ON Animation Studios	Won	
2016	Hollywood Music in Media Awards	Best Original Score – Animated Film	Hans Zimmer and Richard Harvey	Nominated	
2017	Annie Awards	Outstanding Achievement in Production Design in an Animated Feature Production	Lou Romano, Alex Juhasz and Celine Desrumaux	Nominated	
2017	Annie Awards	Outstanding Achievement, Music in an Animated Feature Production	Hans Zimmer, Richard Harvey and Camille	Won	
2017	British Academy Children's Awards	Feature Film	Mark Osborne, Aton Soumache, Alexis Vonarb, Dimitri Rassam	Won	
2017	Visual Effects Society Awards	Outstanding Visual Effects in an Animated Feature	Pascal Bertrand, Jamie Caliri, Jinko Gotoh and Mark Osborne	Nominated	
2017	Saturn Awards	Best Animated Series or Film on Television	The Little Prince	Nominated	
