= A Triumph of the Heart: The Ricky Bell Story =

- Genre: Biography; Drama; Sport
- Written by: Jeff Andrus
- Directed by: Richard Michaels
- Starring: Mario Van Peebles; Lane R. Davis; Polly Holliday; Lynn Whitfield
- Theme music composer: James McVay
- Country of origin: United States
- Original language: English

Production
- Executive producer: Howard Lipstone
- Producers: David Permut; Daniel Levy
- Production location: Houston, Texas
- Cinematography: Mike Fash
- Editor: Andrew Cohen
- Running time: 100 min.
- Production companies: Landsburg Company; Procter & Gamble Productions

Original release
- Network: CBS
- Release: April 2, 1991

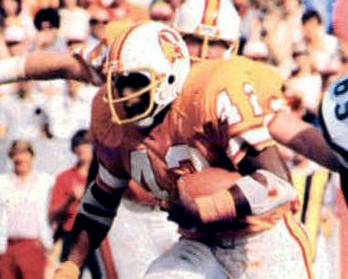
Ricky Bell.

A Triumph of the Heart: The Ricky Bell Story is a 1991 CBS made-for-TV movie that recounts the life of Ricky Bell, a Tampa Bay Buccaneers running back sickened with dermatomyositis, and Ryan Blankenship, a physically impaired child. The movie takes place during the 1981 Buccaneers season, including actual gameplay footage and a dramatized role played by Mario Van Peebles. Bell finds himself befriending an impaired child who inspire each other to become better in their own ways.

== Cast ==
- Mario Van Peebles as Ricky Bell (including actual gameplay footage of the real Ricky Bell)
- Lane R. Davis as Ryan Blankenship
- Polly Holliday as Ruth Weidner
- Lynn Whitfield as Natala Bell
- Susan Ruttan as Carol Blankenship
- James Zachary as Lee Roy Selmon
- John Schumacher as Charley Hannah
- Duriel Harris as Danny Reece
- Dennis Letts as Ed Warren
- Woody Watson as Larry Blankenship
- Marcus Allen as himself
- Jay Pennison as Steve Wilson
- Doug Williams as himself (only through gameplay footage)

== See also ==
- List of American football films
