= Farce of the Penguins =

- DVD cover
- Directed by: Bob Saget
- Written by: Bob Saget
- Based on: March of the Penguins by Luc Jacquet
- Produced by: David Permut; Bob Saget
- Starring: Christina Applegate; Lewis Black; Mo'Nique; Tracy Morgan; Bob Saget
- Narrated by: Samuel L. Jackson
- Cinematography: Scott Billups
- Edited by: Michael R. Miller
- Music by: Peter Rodgers Melnick
- Production company: Permut Presentations
- Distributed by: THINKFilm
- Release date: January 30, 2007
- Running time: 80 minutes
- Country: United States
- Language: English
- Budget: $5 million
- Box office: $6,832

Farce of the Penguins is a 2007 American mockumentary written and directed by Full House star Bob Saget. It is a parody of the French feature-length nature documentary March of the Penguins directed and co-written by Luc Jacquet. The film features Samuel L. Jackson as narrator, with the two main characters voiced by Saget and Lewis Black. Five of Saget's former Full House co-stars also lent their voices to the film. Farce of the Penguins was released direct-to-DVD by THINKFilm on January 30, 2007. The film received negative reviews from critics.

Additional voices were also provided by Tracy Morgan, Christina Applegate, James Belushi, Whoopi Goldberg, Dane Cook, Abe Vigoda, Mo'Nique, David Koechner, Jamie Kennedy, Harvey Fierstein, Alyson Hannigan, and others.

== Synopsis ==
Samuel L. Jackson narrates the story about a group of male penguins that make a seventy-mile trek to go to their breeding grounds, where females are waiting to have sex with them.

These penguins include Carl (Bob Saget) and Jimmy (Lewis Black), two friends who talk about relationships and other things as they meet new characters including Marcus (Tracy Morgan), a penguin who likes to kid around and brag about his huge penis, and Steve the snowy owl (Jonathan Katz), who gives Carl advice on his life in a Freudian kind of way while billing him for the two quick sessions. Meanwhile, Melissa (Christina Applegate) and Vicky (Mo'Nique) argue about men and other women who bother them as they wait for their mates to arrive at the breeding grounds.

== Cast ==
- Samuel L. Jackson as Narrator
- Bob Saget as Carl
- Christina Applegate as Melissa
- Jamie Kennedy as Jamie
- David Koechner as Melvin
- Harvey Fierstein as Sheila
- Lewis Black as Jimmy
- Whoopi Goldberg as Helen
- Mo'Nique as Vicky
- Tracy Morgan as Marcus
- Mario Cantone as Sidney
- Joely Fisher as Amanda
- Drea De Matteo as Esther
- Carlos Mencia as Juan Sanchez
- Lori Loughlin as Melvin smacking penguin
- Vanessa Evigan as Hilton penguin
- Dane Cook as Online penguin
- Jason Alexander as Penguin on belly
- Jason Biggs as Insecure penguin
- Norm Crosby as Carl's grandfather
- Norm Macdonald as Join Twosomes penguin
- Jonathan Katz as Steve the Owl
- Brie Larson as "I need a Z Pack" penguin
- James Belushi as "They're all bitches" penguin
- Dave Coulier as "There's no snow" penguin
- B.J. Novak as "I hope there's sand dabs" penguin
- John Stamos as "What's global warming?" penguin
- Jodie Sweetin as "He's so gross" penguin
- Jon Lovitz as "My eyes are up here" penguin
- Gilbert Gottfried as "I'm freezing my nuts off!" penguin
- Damon Wayans as "Hey, that's my ass!" penguin
- Abe Vigoda as Penguin from Boca
- Alyson Hannigan as Hottie penguin
- Jonathan Silverman as Seal critics
- Jeff Ross as Tourist Human Dad
- Penn Jillette as Leopard seal gang member
- Scott Weinger (uncredited) as Horny penguin

== Production ==
THINKFilm describes Farce of the Penguins as the story of "one penguin's search for love while on a seventy mile trek with his libidinous buddies on their way to a hedonistic mating ritual." Despite what the poster suggests, Farce of the Penguins is not an animated feature; it uses real stock footage of penguins.

Bob Saget stated on The Howard Stern Show on January 29, 2007, Late Night with Conan O'Brien on January 30, 2007, and on Tom Green Live that he originally wanted to simply redub the documentary March of the Penguins, but did not receive permission from the film producers.

== Reception ==
Joe Leydon for Variety gave a negative review, calling it "a one-joke comedy that ThinkFilm wisely dropped into the straight-to-vid pipeline."
