= All-American Murder =

- Directed by: Anson Williams
- Written by: Barry Sandler
- Produced by: Bill Novodor
- Starring: Christopher Walken; Josie Bissett; Charlie Schlatter
- Cinematography: Geoffrey Schaaf
- Edited by: Jonas Thaler
- Music by: Rod Slane
- Production company: Trimark Pictures
- Distributed by: Trimark Pictures
- Release date: December 1, 1991
- Running time: 94 minutes
- Country: United States
- Language: English

All-American Murder is a 1991 American direct-to-video thriller film directed by Anson Williams and starring Christopher Walken and Charlie Schlatter. It was released on December 18, 1991, in UK.

== Plot ==
Delinquent Artie Logan is released from jail following an incident in his college dorm involving fire and his pet snake. His conservative judge father picks him up, berating him for his history of pyromania and having been kicked out of 12 other schools. He enrolls him at Fairfield College. The first day there, Artie catches the attention of the Dean’s wife, Erica. They sleep together, and she laments her unhappy marriage.

In class the next day, he meets Tally Fuller. While stalking Tally, he meets Wendy Stark, one of her friends. He eventually introduces himself to Tally, and they develop chemistry despite her reservations about entering a relationship with him. Artie is threatened by Doug Sawyer, one of Tally’s friends with designs on her as well. Tally eventually agrees to go to dinner with Artie. On the drive back, Tally tells him that she is sponsoring Wendy to join the Phi Beta Kappa sorority, but the other sisters object. She also invites him to watch her cheerleader practice the next day. He meets her there, then is antagonized by the dean, who says he knows of his history, before going on a conservative rant against him.

Eccentric police officer P.J. Decker solves a hostage situation by using the criminal’s jealousy against him. That same night, Tally is apparently killed by an assailant with a blowtorch, who lights her on fire. Artie is arrested on suspicion of her murder, but Decker believes he is innocent. After Artie’s father bails him out of jail, Decker gives him 24 hours to try and catch the killer.

He goes to the sorority sister who saw him at the scene of the crime. She says Tally received letters from him threatening her if she did not go out with him. He sneaks into her room to try and find the letters. He instead finds a videotape, but has to hide, as the creepy handyman he saw around campus earlier enters the room. He finds an envelope in her underwear drawer, but catches Artie, who flees. Back in his dorm room, Artie watches the tape, which shows Tally denigrating Wendy and blackballing her from the sorority. He is devastated that she acted so cruelly and hypocritically towards someone who considered her a friend.

Absentmindedly taking the tape, he goes to Wendy’s dorm room to try and get information. She enlists his help folding laundry, and he shares his evidence and suspicion of the handyman, Harry Forbes. He leaves, but realizes he left the tape in Wendy’s room, and is too late in stopping her from watching it. Comforting Wendy, she tells him of a time she saw Tally shoplifting downtown, and didn’t tell. That incident led to them becoming friends, because Tally knew Wendy would share her secrets.

Arriving back at his dorm room, Artie is met by Decker, who reminds him of his time limit. He also says they will have a better shot at finding the killer if they work together. On the run from Decker’s fellow officers, who think he did it, Artie hides in the school basement, diverting Forbes away from his room. Searching through it, Artie finds a shrine to Tally, as well as the envelope, which contains illicit photos of her having sex with Doug and another woman. Leaving with the envelope, Artie is caught by Forbes, who chases him with a power drill. He knocks Forbes unconscious, and leaves to call Decker. While he is on the phone, Forbes is murdered by the killer with the power drill. Returning to the basement, Artie finds Forbes dead.

Artie visits Doug, showing him the photos of him and Tally, and demanding answers. Doug says it was because their parents pushed them to always be perfect. As a form of release, he and Tally would engage in debaucherous, drug-fueled sex with an anonymous hooker. Doug tried to get her to stop, but she wanted to go farther as a break from the “little miss perfect” act. Artie promises Doug he will get the photos back when Artie is cleared. Artie leaves to call Decker, returning to his apartment to find it ransacked. He is surprised by Mrs. Darby, who tells him the door was open, so she waited for him. She says that her husband killed Tally, explaining that she saw the two of them having sex. He killed Tally because she humiliated him. Leaving for her car, Mrs. Darby is bit by a snake that looks identical to Artie’s pet snake. Shortly after, Doug is murdered in Artie’s apartment by being stabbed in the back. With all signs pointing towards Artie, Decker loses his patience and declares his intent to arrest him as the killer. Artie insists he is being framed, as it is too obvious. Decker’s coworkers enter Artie's apartment, wanting to arrest him for the murders, as well as frame him for others, including a missing student from another school nearby who matches Tally’s description.

As the police search his apartment, Artie goes to Wendy’s dorm, waking her up. He asks to borrow her car, telling her to meet him at the belltower where Tally was killed. Exercising in his home, dean Darby is killed when the killer drops a grenade down his pants. Artie finds the body, being arrested by the police on suspicion of being the killer. He tries telling them that Wendy will be killed at the belltower, but they don’t believe him.

Artie causes a distraction by lighting a newspaper on fire, escaping when Decker’s colleagues stop to get out. Wendy is attacked by the killer, who is tackled by Artie and disarmed by Decker. The killer turns out to be Tally. She killed the missing girl from the other college to fake her own death, and staged everything else to frame Artie. She tries attacking Decker with the blowtorch she used to kill the missing girl, but Artie manages to turn it on her, burning her face. Tally is arrested by Decker, being led away by paramedics. Decker thanks Artie for restoring his faith in his job, and Artie and Wendy walk away together.

== Cast ==
- Christopher Walken as P.J. Decker
- Charlie Schlatter as Artie Logan
- Josie Bissett as Tally Fuller
- Joanna Cassidy as Erica Darby
- Richard Kind as Lou Alonzo
- Woody Watson as Frank Harley
- Mitchell Anderson as Doug Sawyer

== Production ==
The film was mostly filmed in Sand Springs, Oklahoma. The campus in the film is Oklahoma State University–Stillwater in Stillwater, Oklahoma. The football scenes, the stadium and the shower scene were all filmed at Union High School's Tuttle Stadium in Tulsa, Oklahoma.
