= David Permut =

American film and television producer

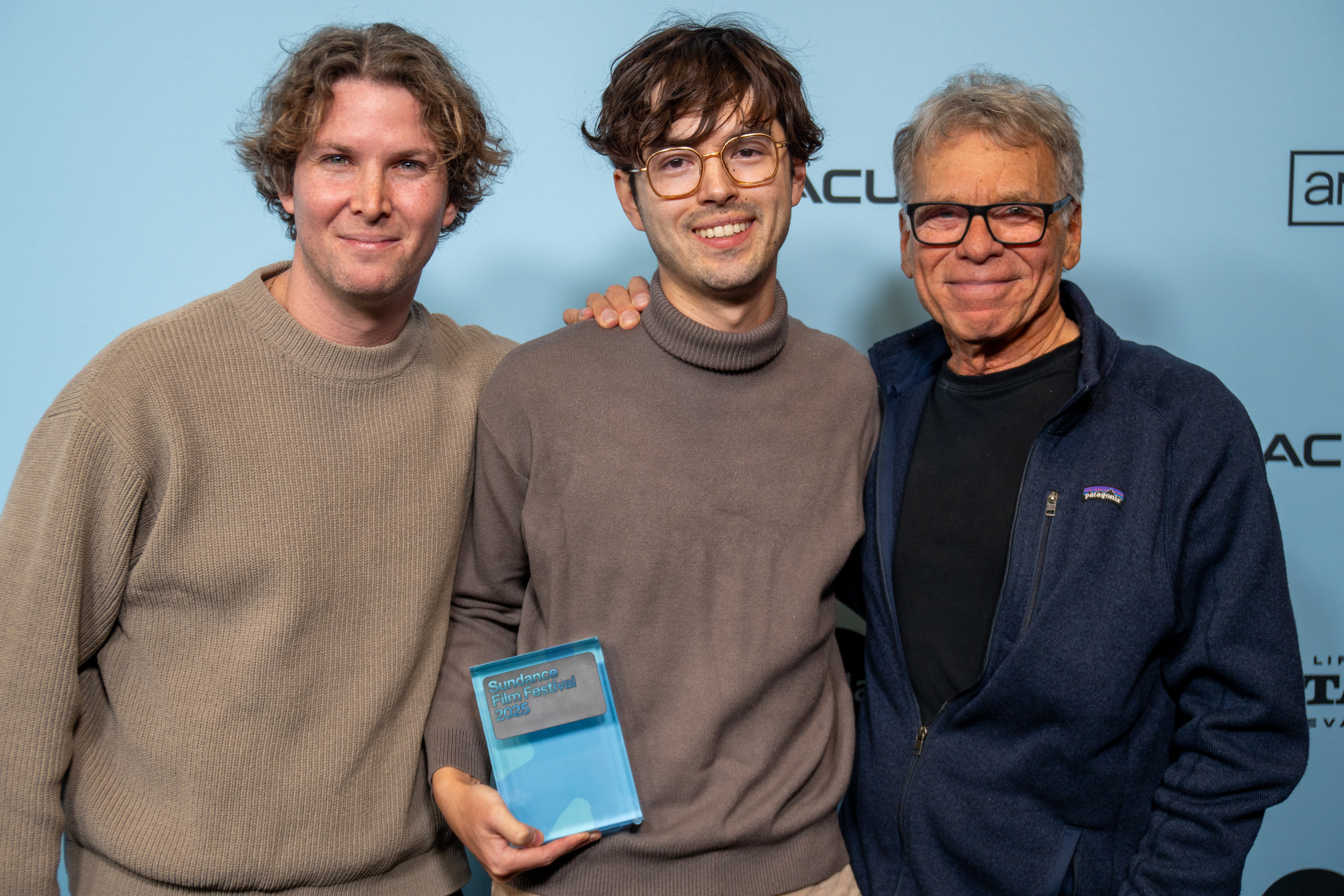
- Permut in 2025
- Born: March 23, 1954 (age 72); New York City, New York, U.S.
- Occupation: Film producer

David A. Permut (born March 23, 1954) is an American film producer. He has worked on dozens of films, and has received both Academy and Emmy Award nominations.

== Early life and education ==
Permut was born in New York City, New York to a Jewish family, the son of entrepreneur Lee Permut. His family moved from Manhattan to Los Angeles while he was a teen. While a youth, he sold maps to the Hollywood homes of the stars and later mixed with them at the Palm Springs Racquet Club and the Tennis Club, after his father purchased a second home in Palm Springs in the 1970s. He was introduced to producer Bill Sargent through family who helped him secure some casting calls. Permut then went to work as a gofer for Roger Corman while he was taking classes at UCLA and later accepted a job at an independent talent agency in Beverly Hills.

== Career ==
=== Feature films ===
Early in his career, Permut produced the 1975 film Give 'em Hell, Harry!, which was his first producer credit. Shortly afterwards, he co-produced the 1979 comedy concert film Richard Pryor: Live in Concert, which was considered one of the first major theatrical stand-up comedy films, with Bill Sargent. He went on to produce the 1987 films Dragnet and Blind Date. In 1986, he then signed a production agreement with United Artists, where he is planning on to produce films like an adaptation of the 1950s TV show Highway Patrol, but it never came to fruition. He later produced the John Woo film Face/Off.

In 1991, Permut signed a three-year first look development and production deal with New Line Cinema, which resulted in his production company, Permut Productions, becoming a subsidiary of New Line Cinema.

He has produced a number of other films, including 1991's The Marrying Man and 29th Street, 1992's Captain Ron and Consenting Adults, 1993's The Temp, 1994's Surviving the Game, and others. 29th Street (1991) released by Twentieth Century Fox, Permut worked with Bob Saget on the March of the Penguins parody film Farce of the Penguins in 2007. He produced the 2016 film Hacksaw Ridge, which was premiered at the Venice Film Festival. It was nominated for six Academy Awards including Best Picture.

In addition to studio films, Permut has produced a number of independent films including Charlie Bartlett, Youth in Revolt, Struck by Lightning, and Match.

Other independent films Permut has produced include The Polka King, which premiered at the Sundance film festival, and starring Jack Black, and Punching Henry, which debuted at SXSW.

Permut was the co-producer alongside Ben Stiller of the 2009 documentary The Boys: The Sherman Brothers' Story, and later The Fabulous Allan Carr. In 2010, Permut also produced the five-part documentary series Visible: Out on Television for Apple TV+.

In 2019, Permut produced The Investigation: A Search for the Truth, a live staged reading of excerpts from the Mueller Report, with a cast that included John Lithgow, Kevin Kline, and Zachary Quinto.

Permut executive produced the 2023 Netflix film Rustin, a biopic about civil rights leader Bayard Rustin, alongside Barack and Michelle Obama through Higher Ground Productions.The film has won numerous awards, including a Best Actor Academy Award nomination for Coleman Domingo.

Permut produced the feature film Twinless, written, directed by, and starring James Sweeney and co-starring Dylan O’Brien, which premiered at the Sundance Film Festival in January 2025. The film received the Sundance 2025 U.S. Dramatic Audience Award, as well as the U.S. Dramatic Special Jury Award for Dylan O’Brien.

Permut also executive produced the documentary, Raoul Wallenberg: Missing Inaction, which premiered at the Palm Springs International Film Festival in 2026.

Permut produced the 2026 film The Invite, which was co-produced by Annapurna Pictures and FilmNation, directed by Olivia Wilde, and starred Wilde, Seth Rogen, Penélope Cruz, and Edward Norton.

Permut also produced the Apple Original Film Being Heumann, which was based on the memoir by Judy Heumann, was directed by Siân Heder, and starred Mark Ruffalo, Ruth Madeley, and Dylan O’ Brien.

Films produced by Permut have premiered at film festivals including Venice, Telluride, TIFF, and Sundance, and SXSW.

His television credits include 1984's Love Leads the Way, 1987’s Mistress, 1991's A Triumph of the Heart: The Ricky Bell Story, 1992's Breaking the Silence, 2009's Emmy-nominated and GLAAD Award-winning Prayers for Bobby, 2014's The Color of Rain, and 2023's series Lawman: Bass Reeves.

=== Theatre ===
He has done theatre production, including the stage production of The Investigation: A Search for the Truth in Ten Acts. He is slated to produce the Broadway theatre stage production Behind the Candelabra.

== Personal life ==
As of 2016, Permut has lived in Westwood, California. He has a second home in Palm Springs.

== Filmography ==
He was a producer in all films unless otherwise noted.

=== Film ===
Year	Film	Credit	Notes
1975	Give 'em Hell, Harry!		
1979	Richard Pryor: Live in Concert	Producer	
1982	Fighting Back		
1987	Blind Date	Co-executive producer	
1987	Dragnet	Producer	
1991	The Marrying Man	Producer	
1991	29th Street	Producer	
1992	Captain Ron	Producer	
1992	Consenting Adults	Producer	
1993	The Temp	Producer	
1993	Three of Hearts	Executive producer	
1993	Money for Nothing	Executive producer	
1994	Surviving the Game	Producer	
1994	Trapped in Paradise	Executive producer	
1996	Eddie	Producer	
1997	Face/Off	Producer	
2001	Double Take	Producer	
2002	Route 52	Producer	
2003	DyFunktional Family	Producer	
2004	The Last Shot		Uncredited
2006	Local Color	Producer	
2006	Farce of the Penguins	Producer	
2007	Charlie Bartlett	Producer	
2008	My Mom's New Boyfriend	Executive producer	
2009	Youth in Revolt	Producer	
2012	Struck by Lightning	Producer	
2014	Match	Producer	
2016	Punching Henry	Producer	
2016	Hacksaw Ridge	Producer	
2017	The Polka King	Producer	
2019	The Investigation: A Search for the Truth in Ten Acts	Producer	
2023	Rustin	Executive Producer	
2025	Twinless	Producer	
2025	Raoul Wallenberg: Missing Inaction	Executive Producer	
2026	Being Heumann	Producer	
2026	The Invite	Producer	
TBA	Untitled Face/Off Sequel	Executive producer	

Camera and electrical department

Year	Film	Role
1973	The Student Teachers	Film loader

Miscellaneous crew

Year	Film	Role
1973	Your Three Minutes Are Up	Production assistant

=== Television ===
Year	Title	Credit	Notes
1984	Love Leads the Way: A True Story	Executive producer	Television film
1984	His Mistress		Television film
1987	Mistress	Supervising producer	Television film
1991	A Triumph of the Heart: The Ricky Bell Story		Television film
1992	Breaking the Silence	Executive producer	Television film
2009	Prayers for Bobby	Executive producer	Television film
2014	The Color of Rain	Executive producer	Television film
2020	Visible: Out on Television	Principal producer	Television documentary series
2023	Lawmen: Bass Reeves	Executive producer	Television series
