= Gustin Nash =

American film producer

- Occupations: Screenwriter; Film producer
- Writing career
- Notable works: Charlie Bartlett (2007); Youth in Revolt (2010)

Gustin Nash is an American screenwriter best known for writing the 2007 film Charlie Bartlett and the 2010 film Youth in Revolt.

== Life and career ==
Nash began writing the screenplay for Charlie Bartlett when he was 26 years old and working at a mall in Burbank, California. He spent time with a group of teenagers through to thirty-year-olds—the "sub-culture of the mall"—watching films and playing video games, and noticed the discrepancies between the teenagers' behavior and the way they were portrayed in the teen films they saw. He had attended the University of Southern California to learn screenwriting and had already written nine as-yet unsuccessful spec scripts. He went to his father, a psychiatrist, and told him that he was unsure of whether he could become a successful screenwriter in the film industry. His father advised him to create a list of everything he hoped to accomplish, and write next to each "You can do it". That night, he dreamed of a character who remained optimistic and whose mantra was "You can do it"; he says the entire film came to him in one night, and he had completed the Charlie Bartlett screenplay in four weeks after observing his teenage friends further for inspiration.

As Nash finished writing Charlie Bartlett, he read C. D. Payne's novel Youth in Revolt for the first time. He wrote the screenplay for a film adaptation of the same name. He says that, writing the screenplay, he stayed as honest to the novel as possible besides changing the ending because he envied Payne's writing, saying jokingly, "Here was a chance to take credit for writing something that was much better than what I'd come up with on my own." He says he preferred adapting Youth in Revolt to writing Charlie Bartlett as he had source material, and in early 2008 he was working on a spec script based on a graphic novel series of short stories called Rumble, Young Man, Rumble, which he is in an agreement to direct as well. In 2008 he was working on another teen film to star Vince Vaughn titled Career Day, based around a high school career day where adults visit the school to speak about their professions. In 2021 Nash sold a script about Kate Warne to Amazon after an intense six studio bidding war. As of 2026 it has yet to be produced.
