= Charlie Bartlett =

2007 film by Jon Poll

- Theatrical release poster
- Directed by: Jon Poll
- Written by: Gustin Nash
- Produced by: Sidney Kimmel; Barron Kidd; Jay Roach; David Permut
- Starring: Anton Yelchin; Hope Davis; Kat Dennings; Robert Downey Jr.; Tyler Hilton
- Cinematography: Paul Sarossy
- Edited by: Alan Baumgarten
- Music by: Christophe Beck
- Production companies: Metro-Goldwyn-Mayer Pictures; SKE; Everyman Pictures; Texon Entertainment; Permut Presentations
- Distributed by: MGM Distribution Co.
- Release dates: May 1, 2007 (Tribeca); February 22, 2008 (United States)
- Running time: 97 minutes
- Country: United States
- Language: English
- Budget: $12 million
- Box office: $5.3 million

Charlie Bartlett is a 2007 American coming-of-age comedy-drama film directed by Jon Poll. The screenplay by Gustin Nash focuses on a teenager who begins to dispense therapeutic advice and prescription drugs to the student body at his new high school in order to become popular.

The film premiered at the Tribeca Film Festival on May 1, 2007, and was shown at the Cannes Film Market, the Maui Film Festival, and the Cambridge Film Festival before going into theatrical release in the United States and Canada on February 22, 2008. The film received mixed reviews from critics and grossed $5.3 million against its $12 million budget.

== Plot ==
Wealthy teenager Charlie Bartlett — after being expelled from several private academies for various infractions — enrolls in a public school run by embittered alcoholic Principal Nathan Gardner. Unable to fit in with most of his fellow students, Charlie is diagnosed with ADHD. He forms an alliance with school bully Murphy Bivens and offers him half the proceeds from the sale of a variety of prescription drugs Charlie obtains by feigning physical and emotional symptoms during sessions with different psychiatrists.

Before long, Charlie's natural charm and likability position him as the school's resident therapist, offering advice and drugs within the confines of the boys' bathroom. Charlie's social life improves as he gains the confidence and admiration of the student body and begins dating the principal's rebellious daughter, Susan. Charlie is suspended for three days after distributing a collection of videos showing Bivens beating up various students. His mother takes him to visit his father, who is serving time in prison for tax evasion, but Charlie is reluctant to go inside.

Complications arise when seriously depressed Kip Crombwell attempts suicide by swallowing a handful of anti-depressants provided by Charlie. Charlie befriends Kip after having an in-depth conversation with Principal Gardner. Charlie discovers Kip is writing a play about adolescent issues and pitches the idea to Gardner, who is, at first, unsure but agrees when Kip says that it would make him less inclined to attempt suicide again. Charlie decides to stop selling drugs to students but continues to provide free therapy.

Charlie arrives at Susan's house to pick her up for a date, and he gives her a pharmacy bag. Mr. Gardner comes out and, thinking the bag contains drugs, attempts to grab Susan to make her go into the house. Charlie warns Mr. Gardner not to touch Susan, but he pushes Charlie instead. Charlie then punches Gardner reflexively, and even though he tries to apologize, the principal does not forgive him. Susan and Charlie then drive off, and the bag turns out to contain nicotine gum to aid Susan in quitting smoking cigarettes.

That night, a large group of students is protesting against security cameras in the student lounge. The police arrive and arrest Charlie for assault, and the kids riot and trash the building in protest. As a result, Principal Gardner is fired. Charlie is released on bail. Before the play, which features Susan, Charlie goes to Mr. Gardner's house to invite him. Charlie finds Mr. Gardner drunk and waving a gun. They get into a heated argument; Charlie attempts to tackle Mr. Gardner and falls into the pool, hitting his head. Mr. Gardner comes to his senses and dives into the pool to rescue him. Charlie says he thought Mr. Gardner was about to attempt suicide, and he replies that he cannot kill himself as he has too many responsibilities. They talk about their problems with Charlie's father and Susan, then go to the play.

Mr. Gardner takes up his old job as a history teacher again and is now much happier. Charlie finally gains the confidence to visit his father in prison and applies for a summer internship at a psychiatric institute.

== Cast ==
- Anton Yelchin as Charlie Bartlett
- Hope Davis as Marilyn Bartlett
- Kat Dennings as Susan Gardner
- Robert Downey Jr. as Nathan Gardner
- Tyler Hilton as Murphy Bivens
- Mark Rendall as Kip Crombwell
- Dylan Taylor as Len Arbuckle
- Megan Park as Whitney Drummond
- Jake Epstein as Dustin Lauderbach
- Jonathan Malen as Jordan Sunder
- Lauren Collins as Kelly
- Derek McGrath as Superintendent Sedgwick
- Stephen Young as Stan Weathers
- Abby Zotz as Mrs. Crombwell
- Drake as A/V Jones
- Sarah Gadon as Priscilla

The film features four of the then Degrassi cast members as Charlie's fellow students: Jake Epstein (Craig Manning), Lauren Collins (Paige Michalchuk), Drake (Jimmy Brooks), and Ishan Davé (Linus).

== Production ==
The film was shot on location in Toronto as well as at Parkwood Estate in Oshawa, Ontario and Trafalgar Castle School in Whitby, Ontario. It was also filmed at Western Technical-Commercial School, where parts of Billy Madison, Fever Pitch, Ice Princess, Alley Cats Strike, and Being Erica were shot.

== Soundtrack ==
The soundtrack to Charlie Bartlett was released on January 1, 2008.

No.	Title	Artist	Length
1.	"Charlie's Monologue"	Monologue	1:22
2.	"Charlie's Theme"	Christophe Beck	0:51
3.	"Tennis"	Christophe Beck	1:01
4.	"Unnecessary Trouble"	Hard-Fi	1:01
5.	"Visiting Hours"	Christophe Beck	1:17
6.	"Selling Dvds"	Christophe Beck	0:55
7.	"Charlie & Shrinks"	Dialogue	0:50
8.	"Pusherman"	Curtis Mayfield	5:02
9.	"Jazz It Up"	Christophe Beck	1:58
10.	"Prescription Flush"	Christophe Beck	0:58
11.	"Cameras Going Up"	Christophe Beck	0:38
12.	"First Kiss"	Christophe Beck	1:16
13.	"Oh Yeah"	The Subways	2:57
14.	"Kip Overdoses"	Christophe Beck	2:14
15.	"Voodoo"	Spiral Beach	3:26
16.	"Passing Notes"	Christophe Beck	1:07
17.	"This Is a School, Not a Prison"	Christophe Beck	1:19
18.	"New Clouds, Not Clouds"	Spiral Beach	3:41
19.	"Gardner Hits Bottom"	Christophe Beck	1:19
20.	"Day Ok"	Spiral Beach	2:18
21.	"Seat on This Train"	Tom Freund	4:22
22.	"You're Not Alone"	Christophe Beck	3:26
23.	"Dr. Bartlett"	Christophe Beck	1:44
24.	"If You Want to Sing Out, Sing Out"	Cat Stevens (Performed by Kat Dennings)	2:09
Total length:			47:11

== Critical reception ==
On Rotten Tomatoes the film holds an approval rating of 59% based on 129 reviews, with an average rating of 5.8/10. The website's critical consensus reads: "With engaging performances marked by an inconsistent tone, Charlie Bartlett is a mixed bag of clever teen angst comedy and muddled storytelling." Metacritic assigned the film a weighted average score 54 out of 100, based on 25 critics, indicating "mixed or average" reviews.

Stephen Holden of The New York Times wrote "If the attention span of Charlie Bartlett didn't wander here and there, the movie might have been a high school satire worthy of comparison with Alexander Payne's Election. But as it dashes around and eventually turns soft, it loses its train of thought ... [and] never coalesces into the character-driven, serious comedy with heart that you want it be."

David Wiegand of the San Francisco Chronicle commented: "The script is adequate, although screenwriter Nash has created one distasteful character after another, and there's barely a ripple of relieving humor in the entire film ... The material might have worked better if the filmmakers had adopted a satirical tone, or even if they'd gone the whole American Pie route. Instead, the film grinds on with only a few bright moments. The big problem, though, isn't the script but rather the direction and, specifically, the plodding pace of the film. That's surprising, given that first-time director Jon Poll has a background in film editing. It may have something to do with knowing pretty much what will happen from one moment to the next, but you keep wanting Poll and his cast to get on with things, or at least, energize the film some way or another. The tone is often just turgid ... Yet, for all its problems, the film is often sincere, often earnest ... You'll find yourself rooting for the filmmakers in spite of yourself, and, more to the point, in spite of the mistakes they've made."

Jonathan Rosenbaum of the Chicago Reader called the film "a rebellious teen comedy that isn't as good or as radical as Pump Up the Volume, but still feels like a shot in the arm and is full of irreverent energy." He added, "Despite an ineffectual subplot about the hero's absent father, there are some good satirical riffs here on adult hypocrisies (with Robert Downey Jr. especially good as the beleaguered, alcoholic school principal), a few echoes of the underrated Mumford, and lots of high spirits."

Darrell Hartmann of the New York Sun said, "John Poll's rebellious-teen comedy falls well below the high bar set by recent genre hits Juno and Superbad. An anything-goes kookiness pervades the first half, but the film then takes a trite turn that only serves to highlight its unlikely premise."

David Balzer of Toronto Life, rating it three out of five stars, called it "a cool trip down teen dramedy lane, but one senses the film could be a lot smarter. Bartlett's drug selling, it turns out, is not the main subject of the movie; 'messed-up people' are, and this causes Charlie Bartlett to lean on psychobabble about disaffection that it initially tries so hard to mock. The film's use of Cat Stevens's anthem from Harold and Maude, 'If You Want to Sing Out, Sing Out,' encapsulates its problems; instead of acting as a wry expression of Bartlett's dark philosophy, the song becomes the kind of pat message of self-empowerment that drives teens to Prozac in the first place."

== Home media ==
MGM Home Entertainment released the film on Region 1 DVD on June 24, 2008. Viewers have the option of watching it in fullscreen (with optional commentary by Jon Poll and Gustin Nash) or anamorphic widescreen (with optional commentary by Poll, Anton Yelchin, and Kat Dennings) format. It has audio tracks and subtitles in English and Spanish. Bonus features include Restroom Confessionals and a music video by Spiral Beach.
