= Woody Watson =

American film and television actor

- Watson in All-American Murder, 1991
- Born: Raymond Elwood Watson Jr. February 26, 1948
- Died: January 27, 1999 (aged 50); Trenton, Texas, U.S.
- Occupations: Film and television actor

Raymond Elwood Watson Jr. (February 26, 1948 – January 27, 1999) was an American film and television actor. He was best known for playing Lt. Hendricks in the 1993 film A Perfect World.

== Life and career ==
Watson was born on February 26, 1948, the son of Annabelle Watson. He began his screen career in 1981, appearing in the film Back Roads. In 1983, he appeared in the film Eddie Macon's Run.

Later in his career, Watson guest-starred in television programs including Dangerous Curves and Walker, Texas Ranger (and its spin-off Sons of Thunder), and played the recurring role of Carl Huckstead in the tenth season of the CBS soap opera television series Dallas. In 1993, he played Lt. Hendricks in the film A Perfect World. He also appeared in films such as RoboCop 2, All-American Murder, A Triumph of the Heart: The Ricky Bell Story (as Ryan Blankenship's father Larry), Eye of God, Pray for Death, Blind Fury and Hard Promises. He last appeared in 1999 film A Face to Kill For.

== Death ==
Watson died in a tractor accident on his farm in Trenton, Texas, on January 27, 1999, at the age of 50.
