= Escape from Hat =

Unreleased animated film

- Directed by: Mark Osborne
- Screenplay by: Mark Osborne; Adam Kline
- Based on: Escape from Hat by Adam Kline
- Produced by: Mark Osborne; Jinko Gotoh; Melissa Cobb
- Countries: United Kingdom; United States
- Language: English

Escape from Hat is an unreleased animated fantasy film co-written and directed by Mark Osborne, based on the children's book of the same name by Adam Kline.

The film was set to be released on Netflix, but was canceled in 2022.

== Premise ==
Leek, a desperate and magical rabbit rallies an unexpected band of allies and undertakes an impossible quest to escape from inside a magician's hat and defeating evil black cats as Leek returns to the human boy he dearly loves.

== Production ==
=== Development ===
In April 2017, 20th Century Fox Animation and Blue Sky Studios had announced they would produce the animated film adaptation of Adam Kline's fantasy book "Escape from Hat" with Mark Osborne set to direct and co-write the script with Kline, and Jinko Gotoh producing the film along with Osborne. However, in November 2018, Netflix acquired the film rights and Melissa Cobb joined the production team. According to What's On Netflix, the film was reportedly no longer in development at Netflix.

=== Animation ===
Production of the film started in December 2018. In 2022, Netflix canceled production on the film.
