= Mark Osborne (filmmaker) =

American filmmaker (born 1970)

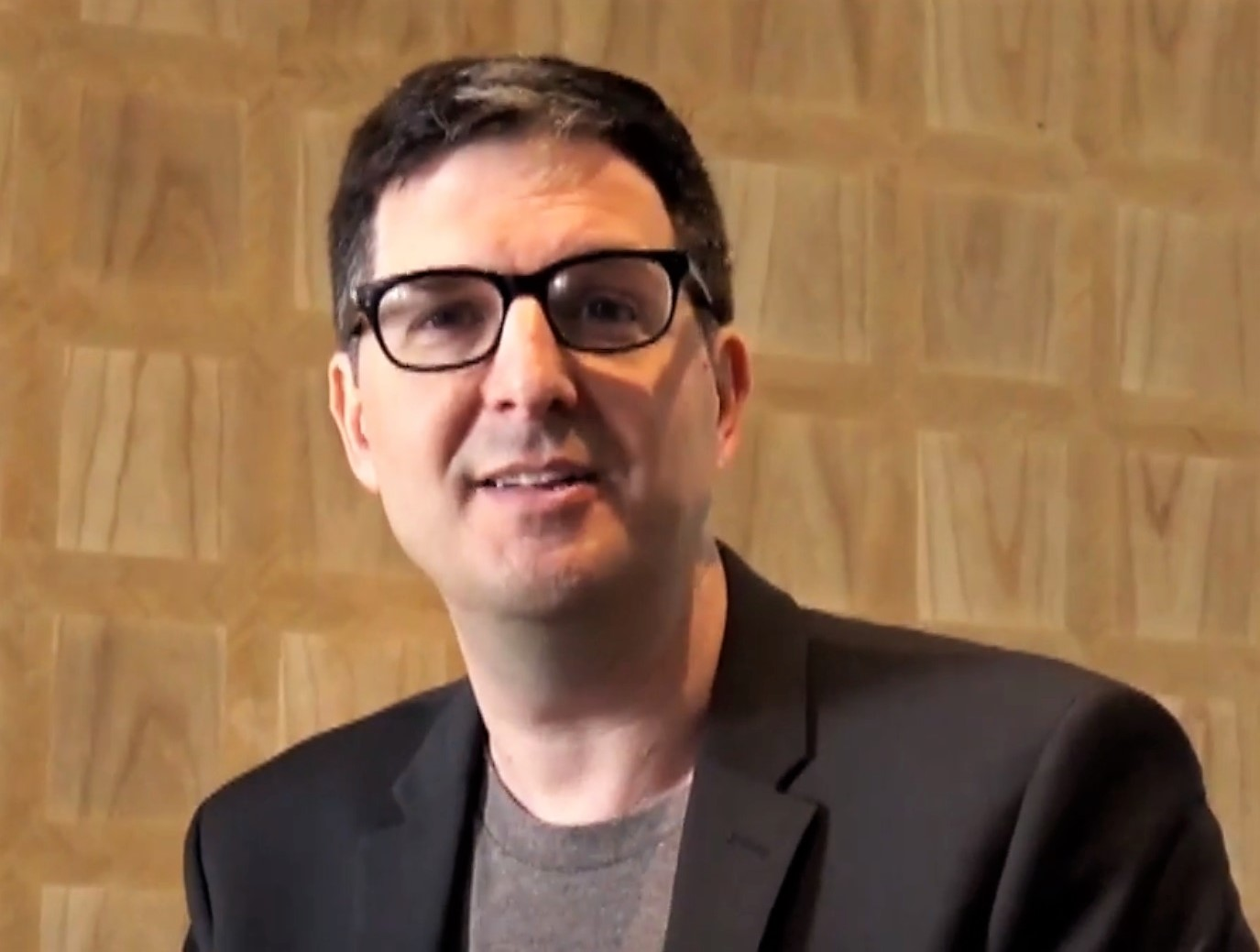
- Osborne in 2016
- Born: Mark Randolph Osborne; September 17, 1970 (age 56); Trenton, New Jersey, U.S.
- Occupations: Film director; film producer; screenwriter; animator
- Years active: 1993–present
- Notable work: More; Kung Fu Panda; The SpongeBob SquarePants Movie; The Little Prince
- Children: Riley; Maddie
- Relatives: Kent Osborne (brother)

Mark Randolph Osborne (born September 17, 1970) is an American film director, producer, screenwriter, and animator. He is best known for directing the animated films Kung Fu Panda (2008) and The Little Prince (2015), the former of which was nominated for the Academy Award for Best Animated Feature. He also directed the stop-motion short film More (1998), which was nominated for Academy Award for Best Animated Short Film.

== Biography ==
Born in Trenton, New Jersey, Osborne grew up in Woodstock, Vermont until at age 14 he moved to Flemington, New Jersey and graduated from Hunterdon Central Regional High School in 1988. He began his career by studying Foundation Art at Pratt Institute in New York before receiving his Bachelor of Fine Arts Degree in Experimental Animation from the California Institute of the Arts in June 1992. His thesis film, Greener, won numerous awards and was screened at more than 40 film festivals worldwide. He has received two Academy Award nominations, including one for Best Animated Feature of the year for the 2008 critically acclaimed Kung Fu Panda which he directed alongside John Stevenson. Kung Fu Panda has netted more than $630 million worldwide to-date. The action-comedy was Osborne's first major studio project. It also won him and Stevenson the Annie Award for Directing in an Animated Feature Production.

Osborne's other most well-known work to date, the award-winning stop motion animated short More, has been screened at over 150 film festivals worldwide. It was the first IMAX animation film to ever be nominated for an Academy Award (1999). More garnered an Oscar nomination for Best Animated Short, Special Jury Prize for Short Films at the Sundance Film Festival (1999), The SXSW Best Animated Short (1999), the ResFest Grand Prize (1999), the Critics Week selection for CANNES (1999), among many others.

Osborne has also directed a majority of the live-action material for the popular animated TV series SpongeBob SquarePants featuring Patchy the Pirate, as well as all of the live-action sequences for The SpongeBob SquarePants Movie, featuring David Hasselhoff. He was classmates with the television show's creator, Stephen Hillenburg, while a student at CalArts. He worked as director on SpongeBob episodes such as "The Sponge Who Could Fly" and "SpongeBob B.C."

His other live-action directing credits include his independent feature film Dropping Out, which premiered at the Sundance Film Festival in 2000 and has developed a cult following. Bachelor Pad was also a short live-action comedy Mark made with his brother Kent along with Dylan Haggerty in the late 1980s. Parts of Bachelor Pad can be seen in the unaired second episode of Taterhole, which was a spin-off of The Rudy and Gogo World Famous Cartoon Show in 1997. His short film Greener was broadcast on TNT's Rudy and GoGo's New Year's Eve Flaming Cheese Ball special on New Year's Eve (1995–96).

Osborne taught stop-motion at his alma mater CalArts, but left to pursue his professional aspirations. In 2004, Osborne was awarded the Guggenheim Fellowship to assist in the production of another personal stop-motion short film, The Better Half. Between 2010 and 2015, Osborne was directing an animated film, The Little Prince. In November 2016, it was reported that Osborne had been hired to direct and co-write an animated film adaptation of Jeff Smith's comic books, Bone.

In April 2017, 20th Century Fox Animation and Blue Sky Studios announced they would produce Escape from Hat, an animated film adaptation of Adam Kline's fantasy book of the same title, with Osborne set to direct and co-write the script with Kline, and Jinko Gotoh producing the film along with Osborne. However, in November 2018, Netflix acquired the film rights and Melissa Cobb joined the production team. As of August 2023, the film was no longer in development at Netflix.

Osborne, along with singer Chris Martin, wrote the story of Coldplay's Mylo Xyloto concept album and directed the video for its track "Hurts Like Heaven". He wrote the first issue of the comic adaptation and still hopes to turn the album into a film.

== Personal life ==
Osborne is the brother of TV writer and producer Kent Osborne. Osborne's son, Riley, voiced the Little Prince in the 2015 film The Little Prince, which was directed by Osborne.

== Filmography ==
- "Jurassic Park" (music video) (1993) (director)
- Greener (1994) (director, writer, cinematographer, editor)
- The Weird Al Show (1997) (director; Opening Sequence)
- More (1998) (director, producer, writer, cinematographer, editor, digital effects artist, stop-motion animator)
- Herd (1999) (Fed #2, Producer)
- SpongeBob SquarePants (1999–2004) (director, live-action director, consulting producer)
- Short 7: Utopia (2000) (director)
- Dropping Out (2000) (director, 'Thank You' Guy)
- Caffeine Headache (2003) (special thanks)
- Channel Chasers (2004) (director: "Channel 295" scene)
- The SpongeBob SquarePants Movie (2004) (director: live-action sequence)
- The Better Half (2004) (director)
- Kung Fu Panda (2008) (director, voice of Pig Patron)
- SpongeBob SquigglePants (2011) (director of Patchy the Pirate cut-scenes)
- The Little Prince (2015) (director and executive producer)
