= Frisco Pigeon Mambo =

2000 novel by C.D. Payne

- Author: C.D. Payne
- Language: English
- Publisher: AIVIA Press
- Publication date: 2000
- Pages: 186
- ISBN: 1882647246

Frisco Pigeon Mambo is a 2000 absurdist fiction novel by author C.D. Payne.

== Plot summary ==
The plot revolves around a group of pigeons who were raised in a scientific lab and forced to smoke cigarettes and drink sherry. Because they have only interacted with humans, they assume they are human. They are extremely happy living in captivity, and their lives are upturned when a clueless animal rights group frees them from the lab. In revenge, the birds wreak havoc on San Francisco in order to maintain their smoking and drinking habits.

== Film adaptation ==
In 1999, the book entered pre-production to be made into an animated film called Frisco Pigeon Mambo by the Farrelly Brothers for 20th Century Fox Animation. In 2000, the project was moved to Blue Sky Studios due to layoffs at 20th Century Fox Animation and the then-closure of their original studio. By 2003, Seth MacFarlane had been added on as a writer, and the project was renamed as Party Animals. The film was never released for unknown reasons.
