= More (1998 film) =

- Directed by: Mark Osborne
- Written by: Mark Osborne
- Produced by: Steve Kalafer
- Edited by: Mark Osborne
- Music by: New Order
- Production companies: Bad Clams Productions; Swell Productions
- Distributed by: Flemington Pictures; Film Movement
- Release date: 1998
- Running time: 6 min
- Country: United States

More is a 1998 short film created by Mark Osborne using stop motion animation. More has won several awards, and was nominated for an Academy Award as Best Animated Short Film in 1998.

== Plot ==
More tells the story of a humanoid inventor who lives in a drab, colorless world. Day by day, he toils away in a harsh, dull, and demoralizing job, his only savior being the memories of the bliss of childhood. But at night, he works secretly on an invention that could help him relive those memories and spread their joy to everyone in his despair-filled life.

When he finishes the invention, it changes the way people look at the world. His success changes him, however, because he loses an important part of himself.

== Production and publication ==
More was written and directed by Mark Osborne, and created by a team that included, among others, Keith and Shannon Lowry, Rick Orner, Nick Peterson, and David Candelaria. Although it was a 6-minute short film, Osborne described it as an "absolutely massive undertaking"—as it was the first short to be shot using the IMAX format. In addition, it was filmed using stop motion, a much more time-consuming method than live-action filming techniques.

Nameless main character of More

Filming More took nine months, and it was first screened in fall of 1998. While it had a positive critical reception—including an Academy Award nomination—commercial options proved limited once the initial hype subsided.

Although More was subsequently included in the Short Cinema Journal #7: Utopia DVD, Osborne was receiving e-mails daily, asking for the short to be released on DVD. One of these was a writer from Despair, Inc., complimenting him on his work, which led to an offer for Despair to fund DVD production and to sell DVDs on their website. The DVD thus created included three commentaries and an hour-long documentary on the creation of More. The film was also released on disk in the second issue of Wholphin Magazine.

== Soundtrack ==
The song featured as background music is titled "Elegia". It was recorded by the band New Order on the 1985 album Low-Life.

== Legacy ==
The film More was adapted into the music video for the song "Hell Bent" by Kenna.

== Awards ==
More was awarded the following honors:

- Sundance Film Festival - Special Jury Prize for Short Films
- South by Southwest - Best Animated Short
- Nominated - Academy Award for Best Animated Short Film
- ResFest – Audience Award for Best Film, Grand Audience Prize for Best Film
- Aspen Shorts Fest - Special Jury prize
- World Fest Houston - Gold / Special Jury Prize for Shorts
- USA Film Festival - Dallas - Grand Jury Prize for Shorts
- Toronto International Short Film Fest - Best Animated Short, Best Short Overall
- Stony Brook Film Fest - Best Short Film
- Message to Man International Film Festival - Russia – Best International Debut Film
- PhilaFilm - Philadelphia – Best Animated Short
- Nominated - Annie Award for Best Animated Short Subject
- St. Louis International Film Festival - Best Short Film
- Uppsala International Short Film Festival/Sweden - Audience Award for Best Film
- San Francisco Indie Fest – Audience Award

== See also ==
- List of stop-motion films
