= Youth in Revolt =

1993 novel by C. D. Payne

- First edition
- Author: C. D. Payne
- Language: English
- Genre: Epistolary novel
- Published: 1993 (Aivia Press)
- Publication place: United States
- Media type: Print (Hardback & Paperback)
- Pages: 499 pp
- ISBN: 1-882647-00-9
- OCLC: 27010427
- Dewey Decimal: 813/.54 20
- LC Class: PS3566.A9358 Y68 1993

Youth in Revolt: The Journals of Nick Twisp is a 1993 epistolary novel by C. D. Payne. The story is told in a picaresque fashion and makes heavy use of dark humor and camp. The book contains parts one through three of an eleven-part series (the three sequential parts were published as three separate books).

== Plot ==
The book's main protagonist is Nicholas "Nick" Twisp, a 14-year-old boy of above-average intelligence from Oakland, California. Nick's life continues like a normal teenager's with his best friend Leroy, a.k.a. Lefty, and his divorced parents George and Estelle. His mother is dating a truck driver named Jerry, who sells a group of sailors a Chevy Nova that dies soon after the sailors get it. In response, the sailors go for revenge. After outsmarting them, Jerry strategically decides to take a vacation, so they all go to a religious mobile home camp in the resort town of Clearlake.

It is there that Nick meets Sheridan "Sheeni" Saunders and his life is turned completely upside down. Through plots to get Sheeni closer to him he ends up with several crimes on his hands (including arson, grand theft auto, and foul play) and is forced to run from the police. Nick tricks everyone into thinking he went to India, thereby escaping the police. Nick hides out with his sister Joanie and returns with help from his friend in Ukiah, Frank "Fuzzy" DeFalco. He dresses in Fuzzy's late grandmother's clothes, adopting the name Carlotta and a conservative disposition. As Nick does so, he befriends Sheeni and several other people whom Nick knew before. While spending the night with Sheeni on Christmas Eve, she reveals to him that she knew from the beginning it was him, not Carlotta. Nick then gets "the best Christmas present a youth could receive," starting a secret relationship with Sheeni.

Nick inherits a fortune when an elderly neighbor of Joanie takes a liking to him and decides to put him in her will. When Joanie's neighbor died, Nick is briefly left half a million dollars richer, until his mother's boyfriend, a somewhat corrupt police officer, seizes the money. Faced with homelessness from the loss of the house he had been squatting in, Nick becomes rich beyond belief when an idea of his, a wart watch, makes it big.

== Characters ==
- Nicholas "Nick" Twisp – The 14-year-old protagonist. The novel is told through his journal entries. Nick is a cynical teen who pines for Sheeni Saunders. He creates, throughout the story, two alter egos: François and Carlotta. Francois is the "bad side" and Carlotta is the relatively "feminine side". He considers himself a misunderstood intellectual.
- François Dillinger – Nick's French "bad-boy" persona. He is named from Sheeni's prediction that her French future husband will have that name. He is often referred to as a separate character, "conversing" with Nick.
- Carlotta Ulansky – Nick's feminine side, who got the last name from an elderly woman he met at his sister Joanie's apartment building. She passes as the old woman's daughter. Nick dresses in Fuzzy's late grandmother's clothes, and attends public school. This of course causes problems in the gym, so Carlotta claims to have a congenital bone dysfunction preventing her from engaging in strenuous activity.
- Sheridan "Sheeni" Saunders – A 14-year-old girl who is the object of Nick's desire. She is very scholarly and verbose, and is shown to be very liberal-minded. This puts her somewhat at odds with her parents. She often remains somewhat aloof to Nick, and it is implied that she still truly loves her original boyfriend, Trent.
- Estelle Twisp – Nick's neurotic mother, an employee of the DMV. She is a heavy smoker who becomes pregnant with Jerry's child midway through the first book, preventing Nick from relocating to Ukiah. This prompts him to "burn down half of Berkeley" in order to force her to send him away.
- George Twisp – Nick's alcoholic father, a failed writer who dates hot young women and neglects his child support duties.
- Joanie Twisp – Nick's crudely rebellious 18-year-old sister who lives in Los Angeles with her boyfriend Dr. Philip Dimby (whom Nick deliberately misaddresses as "Dr. Dingy").
- Jerry – Estelle's trucker boyfriend who is at odds with Nick on many topics, and is the father of Noel Twisp. He dies halfway through the first book from a heart attack.
- Lance Wescott – A sadistic police officer who falls in love with Nick's mother. Nick and Lance quickly develop a hatred of each other, and it is just as well that Nick is sent to Ukiah, because Lance ends up marrying Estelle.
- Mr. Elwyn Saunders – Sheeni's strict lawyer father. He is quick to anger and is not fond of Nick, but approves Trent.
- Mrs. Saunders – Sheeni's religious mother, who also is not fond of Nick, but like her husband, accepts Trent. She is extremely old, and is often referred to as "Sheeni's 5,000-year old mother" by Nick.
- Trent Preston – Nick's nemesis, former boyfriend/current friend of Sheeni (with whom she is still in love)
- Lacey – George's dim-witted 19-year-old girlfriend who works as a stylist.
- Paul Saunders – Sheeni's psychedelic older brother, who speaks in riddles, but is alone able to see through all of Nick's machinations. He has designs on Lacey.
- Frank "Fuzzy" DeFalco – Nick's friend in Ukiah. His father owns a concrete company and is having an affair with a female employee. His mother, in retaliation, has a brief affair with George Twisp. His nickname comes from his extremely hairy body, and his clothes are described as "floating a few inches off his body".
- Vijay Joshi – Nick's friend, and later rival, in Ukiah. He is from India and is a Republican (he later claims to be a Democrat in an effort to woo Sheeni).
- Apurva Joshi – Vijay's 16-year-old sister, who in Nick's eyes, is second to only Sheeni in beauty.
- Noel Wescott, later Jake Twisp – Nick's younger brother. He is originally thought to be the son of the late Jerry, but it is later revealed that he's the product of a one-night stand between Nick's parents. He is born within the original trilogy, and the fifth book, Revoltingly Young, is told from his perspective.
- Scott Twisp – The eventual son of Nick Twisp, who stars in Son of Youth in Revolt, set thirty years after the beginning of the series.
- Nick Twisp II – The son of Nick Twisp from a one-night stand during the elder Nick's time as a famous juggler in Las Vegas. Nick II makes himself known to his father for the first time in Revolt at the Beach, and to date all of the follow-up novels beginning with Licensed to Revolt are told from his perspective.

== Legacy ==
=== Sequels ===
The original book has eleven sequels, for a total of fourteen books.

- Revolting Youth: The Further Journals of Nick Twisp focuses on Nick's transformation into "Rick S. Hunter", and his subsequent marriage to Sheeni.
- Young and Revolting: The Continental Journeys of Nick Twisp. This book tells of Nick and Sheeni's escapades in Paris, and ends with Nick's arrest.
- Revoltingly Young: The Journals of Nick Twisp's Younger Brother, which picks up thirteen years after the events in Young and Revolting. It is told from the point of view of Noel (later Jake) Twisp.
- Son of Youth in Revolt is set approximately thirty years after the first book, and follows the life of Nick's son, Scott Twisp.
- Revolt at the Beach, focuses on Nick Twisp II, long-lost son of Nick, and on the elder Twisp's attempts at making a movie about his life (encompassing the events from the first four books). It is set 38 years after the start of the series. It was released in 2015.
- Licensed To Revolt: The Journals of Twisps on the Move follows more along with Nick Twisp II, his life, his love, and his witty retorts. Set approximately one year after Revolt at the Beach.
- Revolting Obsessions, the 10th novel in the Nick Twisp saga, again picks up with the antics of Nick Twisp II and his friends and family who all struggle to stay relevant in the bustling film industry of California. Set nearly 40 years from the original Youth in Revolt novel, we find Nick Twisp II nearing the end of high school, his father Nick Twisp celebrating his 56th birthday and the birth of yet another child, and plenty of globe-trotting in the name of love and lust. The book was released on May 1, 2019.
- Revolting Relations, the 11th novel in the Nick Twisp saga, was released on August 25, 2019.
- Revolting Times: The Pandemic Journals of Nick Twisp II, the 12th novel in the Nick Twisp saga, was released on October 3, 2020.
- Revolting Narcissists: The Viral Journals of Nick Twisp II, the 13th novel in the Nick Twisp saga, was released on December 20, 2021.
- Wealth Through Leisure: The Recumbent Journals of Nick Twisp II, the 14th novel in the Nick Twisp saga, was released on April 18, 2022.

=== Cut material ===
Cut to the Twisp: The Lost Parts of Youth In Revolt and Other Stories features all of the material that was edited out of post-1993 editions of the first three volumes that make up Youth in Revolt, as well as other short works by Payne.

=== Stage play ===
Youth in Revolt was adapted into an unsuccessful stage play in 1994 by Carl Hamilton and Bob Warden of Box Car Productions. It had its premier at the Cable Car Theater in San Francisco in 1994. It has also been produced in Denver and several locations throughout Northern California with greater success. It is based on the first book, Youth in Revolt.

=== TV pilot ===
In 1998, MTV and Fox television worked together on a television show based on the book. A pilot was filmed, but it was never developed further.

=== Film adaptation ===
In March 2004, a film adaptation of the book was announced, written by Gustin Nash and directed by Miguel Arteta. Michael Cera stars in the role of Nick Twisp, newcomer Portia Doubleday plays Sheeni Saunders, Ray Liotta is Lance Wescott, Jean Smart is Estelle Twisp, Steve Buscemi is George Twisp, and Erik Knudsen is Leroy "Lefty". Justin Long plays Paul Saunders, Sheeni's older brother. The movie was filmed in Michigan. The locations were Royal Oak, Michigan, Rochester, Michigan, Frankfort, Lake Leelanau RV Park, Interlochen, Lake Ann, Ferndale, Detroit, South Lyon, Ann Arbor, Wixom, Brighton, and Hazel Park. It was released on January 8, 2010.
