= C. D. Payne =

American writer of absurdist fiction (born 1949)

- Born: C. Douglas Payne; July 5, 1949 (age 77); Akron, Ohio, U.S.
- Occupations: Author; playwright; portable museum curator
- Writing career
- Genres: Absurdist fiction, humor, plays
- Notable work: Youth in Revolt (1993)
- Website: www.nicktwisp.com

C. D. Payne (born C. Douglas Payne; July 5, 1949) is an American writer of absurdist fiction who is best known for his series of novels about fictional teenager Nick Twisp. They are called the "Youth in Revolt" series or "The Journals of Nick Twisp."

In the novels the protagonist, Nick, strives to balance out his budding sexual urges while remaining an intellectual teenager in a world of moronic adults.

Along with the "Youth" series he is the author of several other novels including Frisco Pigeon Mambo and Civic Beauties, a parody of politics in the United States, which follows the lives of teenage twin girls whose father is campaigning to be vice president. He has also published a play titled, Queen of America: A Royal Comedy in Three Acts. Frisco Pigeon Mambo was bought by Fox Animation, but was never made into a film.

Youth in Revolt was developed and distributed by Dimension Films in January 2010.

== Personal life ==
Payne was born in Akron, Ohio, in 1949, and graduated from Harvard College in 1971. He then moved to California and lived in a trailer in Santa Monica. He has worked as a newspaper editor, cartoonist, typesetter, graphic artist, proofreader, photographer, advertising copywriter, trailer park handyman, and carpenter. Many of his recent novels and stories are set in the 1950s.

He is married and lives with his pet in Sonoma County, California.

Payne is an avid collector of campers, mobile homes, and trailers. His most prized possession is a 1964 Airstream trailer.

== Selected bibliography ==
=== Nick Twisp series ===
1. Youth in Revolt: The Journals of Nick Twisp (contains books 1–3) (Aivia Press, 1993). Contains:

- Book 1: Youth in Revolt
- Book 2: Youth in Bondage
- Book 3: Youth in Exile

NOTE: All subsequent reprints are also titled Youth in Revolt: The Journals of Nick Twisp (Doubleday, 1995: ISBN 0-385-47693-0) (Main Street Books, 1996: ISBN 0-385-48196-9) (published by Quartet in the UK), but they contain edited versions of books 1–3.

- Cut to the Twisp: The Lost Parts of Youth in Revolt and Other Stories (Contains the content that was edited out of the Main Street Books and Doubleday editions of Youth in Revolt, and it also contains an additional dozen short humor pieces) (Aivia Press, 2001: ISBN 1-882647-03-3)

2. Revolting Youth: The Further Journals of Nick Twisp (a.k.a. Book 4: Revolting Youth) (Aivia Press, 2000: ISBN 1-882647-15-7)
3. Young and Revolting: The Continental Journals of Nick Twisp (a.k.a. Book 5: Young and Revolting) (Infinity Publishing, 2006: ISBN 0-7414-3417-2)
4. Revoltingly Young: The Journals of Nick Twisp's Younger Brother (a.k.a. Book 6: Revoltingly Young) (Infinity Publishing, 2006: ISBN 0-7414-3416-4)
5. Son of Youth in Revolt: The Journals of Scott Twisp (a.k.a. Book 7: Son of Youth in Revolt) (CreateSpace Independent Publishing Platform, 2012: ISBN 1466436085)
6. Revolt at the Beach: More Twisp Family Chronicles (a.k.a. Book 8: Youth in Venice) (Aivia Press, 2015: ISBN 1882647068)
7. Licensed To Revolt: The Journals of Twisps on the Move (a.k.a. Book 9: Licensed To Revolt) (Aivia Press, 2018: ISBN 9781882647309)
8. Revolting Obsessions (Aivia Press, 2019)
9. Revolting Relations (Aivia Press, 2019)
10. Revolting Times (Aivia Press, 2020)
11. Revolting Narcissists (Aivia Press, 2021)
12. Wealth Through Leisure (Aivia Press, 2022)

=== Other books ===
- Civic Beauties: A Musical Novel (Aivia Press, 1999: ISBN 1-882647-20-3)
- Frisco Pigeon Mambo (Aivia Press, 2000: ISBN 1-882647-24-6)
- Invisibly Yours (CreateSpace, 2010: ISBN 1-4538-5411-8)
- Helen and Brenda (Aivia Press, 2014: ISBN 1-4961-5109-7)
- Cheeky Swimsuits of 1957 (Aivia Press, 2014: ISBN 1-8826-4701-7)
- Miracle in a Can (Aivia Press, 2016: ISBN 1-8826-4712-2)
- The Unpleasant Poet (Aivia Press, 2017: ISBN 1-8826-4708-4)
- Cary and Randy: A Play in Two Acts (Aivia Press, 2017: ISBN 1-8826-4721-1)
- Gambling on Divorce (Aivia Press, 2023: ISBN 9798397065313)
- Midcentury Mischief: 7 Comic Tales (Aivia Press, 2024: ISBN 9798879393286)
- The Vagabond and the All-Girl Band (Aivia Press, 2024: ISBN 9798335705547)
- The Handsomest Man in the World (Aivia Press, 2025: ISBN 9798281665087)
- Astonishing Relations (Aivia Press, 2026: ISBN 9798257847899)
- A Romp Through Art Hell (Aivia Press, 2026: ISBN 979-8-172-39674-8)

=== Plays ===
- Queen of America: A Royal Comedy in Three Acts (Aivia Press, 2001: ISBN 1-882647-10-6)

The inaugural performance was by the City Lights Theater Company in San Jose, CA.

=== Television and film ===
- Episode #2A of Disney's Recess; titled "Mama's Girl" (3rd episode of the second season). Aired on September 19, 1998. Teleplay was based on a story that C. D. Payne wrote for the show.
- Frisco Pigeon Mambo. The film rights to this novel are currently owned by the now defunct Fox Animation Studios. It is unknown what the status is or plans are with these rights.
- Youth in Revolt was released January 8, 2010.
